= Mitski discography =

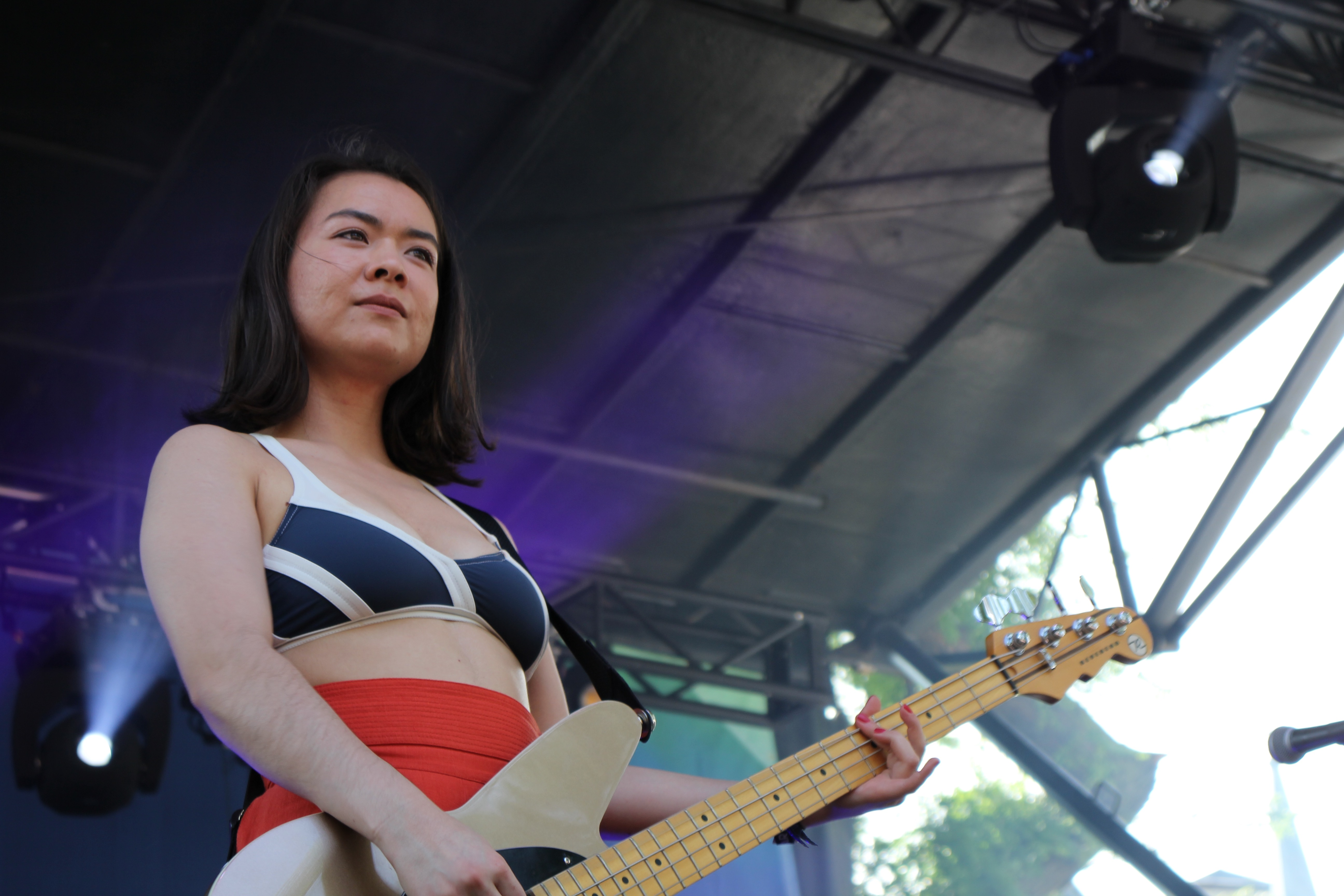
- Mitski in 2017
- Studio albums: 8
- EPs: 3
- Singles: 23
- Music videos: 24

American recording artist Mitski has released eight studio albums, three extended plays, and 23 singles. Mitski's sixth studio album, Laurel Hell, proved to be her most successful album to date, peaking at number 5 on the US Billboard 200. She would follow up with her seventh studio album, The Land Is Inhospitable and So Are We, which included her most commercially successful single, "My Love Mine All Mine".

== Studio albums ==
List of studio albums, with selected details and chart positions
Title	Album details	Peak chart positions											Sales	Certifications
Title	Album details	US	US Rock	AUS	BEL (FL)	CAN	GER	IRE	NLD	NZ	SCO	UK	Sales	Certifications
Lush	Released: January 31, 2012; Label: Self-released; Format: Digital download	—	—	—	—	—	—	—	—	—	—	—		
Retired from Sad, New Career in Business	Released: August 1, 2013; Label: Self-released; Format: Digital download	—	—	—	—	—	—	—	—	—	—	—		
Bury Me at Makeout Creek	Released: November 11, 2014; Label: Double Double Whammy; Format: LP, CD, digital download	—	—	—	—	—	—	—	—	—	78	— (Note: Bury Me at Makeout Creek did not enter the UK Albums Chart, but peaked at number 81 on the UK Album Downloads Chart.)		RIAA: Gold; BPI: Silver
Puberty 2	Released: June 17, 2016; Label: Dead Oceans; Format: LP, CD, cassette, digital download	— (Note: Puberty 2 did not enter the Billboard 200 but did peak at number 81 on the Top Current Albums chart.)	32	—	137	—	—	—	—	—	95	— (Note: Puberty 2 did not enter the UK Albums Chart, but peaked at number 91 on the UK Album Downloads Chart.)		RIAA: Gold; BPI: Silver
Be the Cowboy	Released: August 17, 2018; Label: Dead Oceans; Format: LP, CD, digital download, streaming	52	7	— (Note: Be the Cowboy did not enter the Australian ARIA Albums Chart but peaked at number four on the ARIA Hitseekers Chart.)	187	99	—	56	—	—	40	64		RIAA: Platinum; BPI: Gold; RMNZ: Gold
Laurel Hell	Released: February 4, 2022; Label: Dead Oceans; Format: LP, CD, cassette, digital download, streaming	5	1	7	30	36	28	7	51	14	4	6	US: 24,000	
The Land Is Inhospitable and So Are We	Released: September 15, 2023; Label: Dead Oceans; Format: LP, CD, cassette, digital download, streaming	12	3	13	23	36	30	20	18	5	2	4		RIAA: Gold; RMNZ: Gold
Nothing's About to Happen to Me	Released: February 27, 2026; Label: Dead Oceans; Format: LP, CD, cassette, digital download, streaming	10	2	3	11	50	14	24	15	8	1	4	US: 31,000	
"—" denotes a recording that did not chart or was not released in that territory.

== Live albums ==
List of live albums, with selected details and chart positions
Title	Album details	Peak chart positions
Title	Album details	UK DL
The Land: The Live Album	Released: October 16, 2025; Label: Dead Oceans; Format: LP, digital download, streaming	16

== Extended plays ==
List of extended plays, with selected details and chart positions
Title	EP details	Peak chart positions
Title	EP details	UK Vinyl
Audiotree Live	Released: July 1, 2015; Label: Audiotree; Format: Digital download	—
This Is Where We Fall	Released: May 5, 2021; Label: Z2 Comics; Format: Cassette, vinyl, digital download	—
Stay Soft, Get Eaten: Laurel Hell Demos	Released: August 12, 2022; Label: Dead Oceans; Format: Vinyl	28

== Singles ==
List of singles as lead artist, showing year released and album name
Title	Year	Peak chart positions										Certifications	Album
Title	Year	US	US Rock	AUS	CAN	IRE	NLD	NZ	SWE	UK	WW	Certifications	Album
"First Love / Late Spring"	2014	—	—	─	—	—	—	—	—	—	—	RIAA: Gold; BPI: Silver; RMNZ: Gold	Bury Me at Makeout Creek
"Townie"	2014	—	—	—	─	—	—	—	—	—	—		Bury Me at Makeout Creek
"I Don't Smoke"	2014	—	—	—	─	—	—	—	—	—	—		Bury Me at Makeout Creek
"I Will"	2014	—	—	—	—	─	—	—	—	—	—		Bury Me at Makeout Creek
"Your Best American Girl"	2016	—	—	—	─	—	—	—	—	—	—		Puberty 2
"Happy"	2016	—	—	—	─	—	—	—	—	—	—		Puberty 2
"Between the Breaths" (with Xiu Xiu)	2018	—	—	—	─	—	—	—	—	—	—		How to Talk to Girls at Parties
"Geyser"	2018	—	—	—	─	—	—	—	—	—	—		Be the Cowboy
"Nobody"	2018	—	—	—	─	—	—	—	—	— (Note: "Nobody" did not enter the UK Singles Chart, but peaked at number 14 on the UK Independent Singles Breakers Chart.)	—	RIAA: Platinum; BPI: Silver; RMNZ: Gold	Be the Cowboy
"Two Slow Dancers"	2018	—	—	—	—	—	—	—	—	—	—		Be the Cowboy
"Cop Car"	2020	—	—	—	─	—	—	—	—	—	—		The Turning
"The Baddy Man"	2021	—	—	—	─	—	—	—	—	—	—		This Is Where We Fall
"The End"	2021	—	—	—	─	—	—	—	—	—	—		This Is Where We Fall
"Working for the Knife"	2021	—	27	─	—	—	—	— (Note: "Working for the Knife" did not enter the NZ Singles Chart but did peak at number 21 on the NZ Hot Singles Chart.)	—	—	—		Laurel Hell
"The Only Heartbreaker"	2021	—	34	—	—	—	—	—	—	—	—		Laurel Hell
"Heat Lightning"	2021	—	50	─	—	—	—	—	—	—	—		Laurel Hell
"Love Me More"	2022	—	32	─	—	—	—	—	—	—	—		Laurel Hell
"Glide" (cover) (Note: "Glide" is from the film After Yang and was included on the Rough Trade Records exclusive version of Laurel Hell.)	2022	—	—	─	—	—	—	—	—	—	—		Laurel Hell
"Should've Been Me"	2022	—	41	─	—	—	—	— (Note: "Should've Been Me" did not enter the NZ Singles Chart but did peak at number 38 on the NZ Hot Singles Chart.)	—	—	—		Laurel Hell
"Bug Like an Angel"	2023	—	49	─	—	—	—	— (Note: "Bug Like an Angel" did not enter the NZ Singles Chart but did peak at number 40 on the NZ Hot Singles Chart.)	—	—	—		The Land Is Inhospitable and So Are We
"Star" / "Heaven"	2023	—	—	─	—	—	—	—	—	—	—		The Land Is Inhospitable and So Are We
"My Love Mine All Mine"	2023	26	4	19	17	8	59	5	53	8	12	RIAA: 4× Platinum; BPI: Platinum; IFPI SWE: Gold; RMNZ: 3× Platinum	The Land Is Inhospitable and So Are We
"Where's My Phone?"	2026	—	38	—	—	—	—	— (Note: "Where's My Phone?" did not enter the NZ Top 40 Singles Chart, but peaked at number 11 on the NZ Hot Singles Chart.)	—	— (Note: "Where's My Phone?" did not enter the UK Singles Chart, but peaked at number 89 on the UK Singles Chart Update)	—		Nothing's About to Happen to Me
"I'll Change for You"	2026	—	45	—	—	—	—	—	—	—			Nothing's About to Happen to Me
"If I Leave"	2026	—	31	—	—	—	—	— (Note: "If I Leave" did not enter the NZ Top 40 Singles Chart, but peaked at number 16 on the NZ Hot Singles Chart.)	—	—	—		Nothing's About to Happen to Me
"—" denotes a recording that did not chart or was not released in that territory.

== Other charted and certified songs ==
List of other charted and certified songs, showing year released with chart positions
Title	Year	Peak chart positions							Certifications	Album
Title	Year	US Alt.	US Rock	ICE	IRE	NZ Hot	UK Phy	UK Indie	Certifications	Album
"Liquid Smooth"	2012	—	—	—	—	—	—	—	RIAA: Gold; BPI: Silver	Lush
"Strawberry Blond"	2013	—	—	—	—	—	—	—	RIAA: Gold	Retired from Sad, New Career in Business
"I Want You"	2013	—	—	—	—	—	—	—	RIAA: Gold	Retired from Sad, New Career in Business
"Francis Forever"	2014	—	—	—	—	—	—	—	RIAA: Gold; BPI: Silver; RMNZ: Gold	Bury Me at Makeout Creek
"I Bet on Losing Dogs"	2016	—	—	—	—	—	—	—	RIAA: Gold; BPI: Gold; RMNZ: Platinum	Puberty 2
"Me and My Husband"	2018	—	—	—	—	—	—	—	RIAA: Gold; BPI: Silver; RMNZ: Gold	Be the Cowboy
"Washing Machine Heart"	2018	—	—	—	93	—	—	26	RIAA: Platinum; BPI: Platinum; RMNZ: Platinum	Be the Cowboy
"Valentine, Texas"	2022	—	31	—	—	30	13	—		Laurel Hell
"Stay Soft"	2022	20	23	12	—	27	—	—		Laurel Hell
"Buffalo Replaced"	2023	—	—	—	—	24	—	—		The Land Is Inhospitable and So Are We
"I Don't Like My Mind"	2023	—	—	—	—	22	—	—		The Land Is Inhospitable and So Are We
"I'm Your Man"	2023	—	—	—	—	27	—	—		The Land Is Inhospitable and So Are We
"In a Lake"	2026	—	—	—	—	25	—	—		Nothing's About to Happen to Me
"Cats"	2026	—	—	—	—	31	—	—		Nothing's About to Happen to Me
"Dead Women"	2026	—	—	—	—	32	—	—		Nothing's About to Happen to Me
"—" denotes a recording that did not chart or was not released in that territory.

== Guest appearances ==
List of non-single guest appearances, showing year released and album name
Title	Year	Other artist(s)	Album
"Fireproof" (One Direction cover)	2017	—N/a	Our First 100 Days
"I'm a Fool to Want You" (Frank Sinatra cover)	2017	—N/a	7-Inches for Planned Parenthood
"Let's Get Married"	2019	—N/a	Terrible Thrills Vol. 3
"Susie Save Your Love"	2020	Allie X	Cape God
"Going Going Gone"	2021	Lucy Dacus	Home Video
"This Is a Life"	2022	David Byrne, Son Lux	Everything Everywhere All at Once (Original Motion Picture Soundtrack)
"Not a Love Song"	2022	Sasami	Squeeze
"As Good As It Gets"	2024	Katie Gavin	What a Relief
"Sanctuary"	2025	Tamino	Every Dawn's a Mountain
"Let My Love Open the Door" (Pete Townshend cover)	2025	—N/a	A Big Bold Beautiful Journey (soundtrack)

== Songwriting credits ==
List of songs written or co-written for other artists, showing year released and album name
Title	Year	Artist	Album
"Cape God Theme"	2021	Allie X	Cape God
"Limited Love"	2021	Allie X	Cape God
"No Idea"	2022	Muna	Muna
"Bad Thing"	2023	Miya Folick	Roach
"Everybody Scream"	2025	Florence and the Machine	Everybody Scream
"Buckle"	2025	Florence and the Machine	Everybody Scream

== Music videos ==
List of music videos, showing year released and directors
Title	Year	Director(s)	Ref.
"Strawberry Blond"	2013	Jovon Outlaw	
"Goodbye, My Danish Sweetheart"	2013	Ryan Galloway	
"Shame"	2013	Alan Wertz	
"Humpty"	2013	Jovon Outlaw	
"Class of 2013"	2013	Jovon Outlaw	
"I Want You"	2013	Jovon Outlaw	
"Because Dreaming Costs Money, My Dear"	2013	Heather Barcelo	
"Circle"	2013	Alan Wertz	
"Townie"	2014	Allyssa Yohana	
"Townie"	2015	Faye Orlove	
"Your Best American Girl"	2016	Zia Anger	
"Happy"	2016	Maegan Houang	
"A Burning Hill"	2016	Bradley Rust Gray	
"Geyser"	2018	Zia Anger	
"Nobody"	2018	Christopher Good	
"Washing Machine Heart"	2018	Zia Anger	
"A Pearl"	2019	Saad Moosajee and Art Camp	
"Working for the Knife"	2021	Zia Anger	
"The Only Heartbreaker"	2021	Maegan Houang & Jeff Desom	
"Love Me More"	2022	Christopher Good	
"Stay Soft"	2022	Maegan Houang	
"Bug Like an Angel"	2023	Noel Paul	
"My Love Mine All Mine"	2023	A.G. Rojas	
"Star"	2024	Maegan Houang	
"Where's My Phone?"	2026	Noel Paul	
"I'll Change for You"	2026	Lexie Alley	
