= Mitski: The Land =

- Theatrical release poster
- Directed by: Grant James
- Produced by: Mitski; Grant James; Dalton Sim; Ben Levin; Tom Chiari; Tom Carlson
- Cinematography: Drake Harthun
- Edited by: Ben Montez
- Production companies: Moniker Films; Good Harbor Music
- Distributed by: Trafalgar Releasing
- Release date: October 22, 2025
- Running time: 78 minutes
- Country: United States
- Language: English

Mitski: The Land is a 2025 concert film directed by Grant James. It was shot during Mitski's three shows at Atlanta's Fox Theatre in 2024, in support of her 2023 album The Land Is Inhospitable and So Are We. It was released worldwide in a limited theatrical release starting on October 22, 2025.

== Production ==
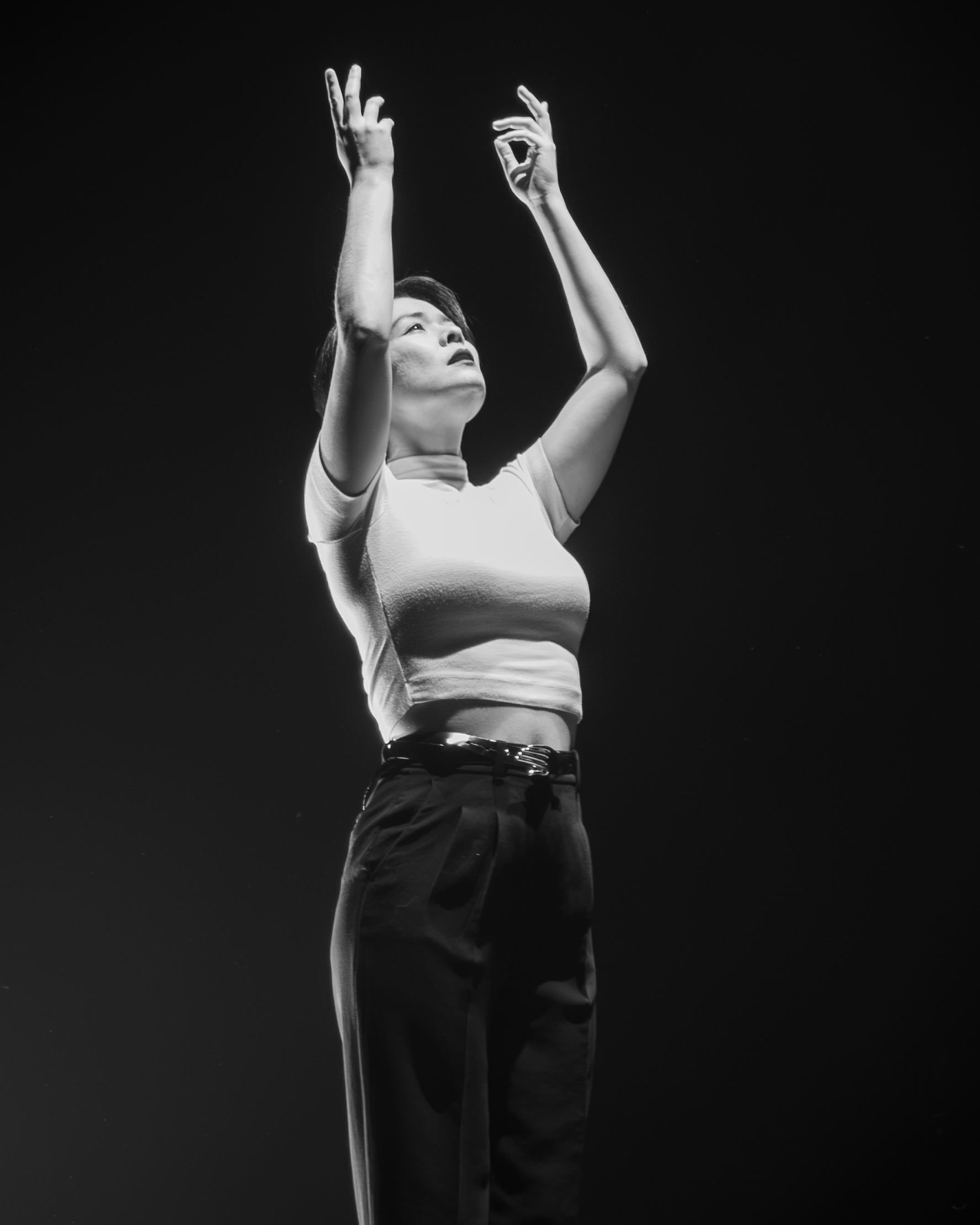
Mitski in 2024

Mitski: The Land includes recordings from three shows Mitski performed at Atlanta's Fox Theatre on September 6–8, 2024, which were in support of her 2023 album The Land Is Inhospitable and So Are We. With a seven-piece backing band, composed of Patrick Hyland, Callan Dwan, Jeni Magaña, Bruno Esrubilsky, Ty Bailie, Fats Kaplin, and Brijean Murphy, the shows included songs from Mitski's 2023 album as well as "reworkings and reimaginations" of earlier songs in her discography. The film was directed by Grant James, who previously worked on music videos and live performance recordings for Father John Misty and Tedeschi Trucks Band. The shows were choreographed by Monica Mirabile with stage design by Andi Watson. Mitski's longtime producer Patrick Hyland mixed the film's audio.

The film was produced by Moniker Films and Good Harbor Music in association with Working Class Film and Dead Oceans.

== Soundtrack ==
The film's soundtrack, The Land: The Live Album, includes 21 songs from the shows and was surprise-released on October 16, 2025, exclusively through Bandcamp. A pre-order on vinyl through Dead Oceans was also made available.

=== Track listing ===
No.	Title	Length
1.	"Everyone"	2:59
2.	"Buffalo Replaced"	2:38
3.	"Working for the Knife"	2:43
4.	"The Deal"	3:53
5.	"Valentine, TX"	2:59
6.	"I Bet on Losing Dogs"	2:58
7.	"Thursday Girl / Geyser"	3:41
8.	"First Love / Late Spring"	4:41
9.	"Star"	4:30
10.	"Heaven"	3:53
11.	"I Don't Like My Mind"	2:21
12.	"I Love Me After You"	2:31
13.	"Happy"	4:16
14.	"My Love Mine All Mine"	2:20
15.	"Last Words of a Shooting Star"	3:08
16.	"Pink in the Night"	3:42
17.	"I Don't Smoke"	2:45
18.	"I'm Your Man"	3:28
19.	"Fireworks"	2:54
20.	"Nobody"	3:22
21.	"Washing Machine Heart"	2:24

== Release ==
Mitski: The Land was first announced on September 8, 2025. The official trailer was released on September 15, with tickets going on sale beginning the same day. The film was released worldwide in a limited theatrical release starting on October 22, 2025, by Trafalgar Releasing. It was screened in 630 theaters across 30 countries.
