= Voice Coils =

Prog-metal band

- Origin: New York, NY
- Genres: Prog Rock; Prog Metal
- Years active: 2013-2015
- Label: Shatter Your Leaves
- Past members: Mitski; Sam Garrett; Cameron Wisch; Tony Gedrich; Caley Monahon-Ward; Kelly Moran; Kevin Wundelich

Voice Coils was an experimental prog-metal band based in New York, NY which lasted from 2013 to 2015. Its members included Sam Garrett as guitarist and keyboardist, Mitski as vocalist, Cameron Wisch as drummer, Caley Monahon-Ward as guitarist in 2015, Kelly Moran as keyboardist in 2015, Kevin Wunderlich as bassist in 2015, and Tony Gedrich as bassist from 2013 to 2014.

== History ==
In 2013 Sam Garret created the ensemble under the record label Shatter Your Leaves, which featured him as lead guitarist, Tony Gedrich as bassist, Cameron Wisch as drummer, and indie music artist Mitski as vocalist. They released their first single, In Sixths / Field and Border, in 2014. Tony Gedrich then left the band and was later replaced by Kevin Wunderlich. Kelly Moran and Casey Monahon-Ward also joined around this time.

After the release of Mitski's critically acclaimed studio album Bury Me at Makeout Creek, she became less involved in the band, but was still featured on the Heaven's Sense EP. However, she was not present at the band's performance at Roullete, a music venue in Brooklyn, in June, 2015. The group was disbanded shortly thereafter.

== Members ==
Sam Garrett, the band's creator, is a musical artist and composer based in Baltimore, MD. He holds a master's degree in music in composition and musicology from Johns Hopkins University. He currently oversees development of the neuroaesthetics community database at the International Arts + Mind Lab of Johns Hopkins University.

Mitski, full name Mitski Miyawaki, is an indie-rock musician best known for her album Be the Cowboy, as well as her song My Love Mine All Mine, initially released as a single and later featured on her album The Land is Inhospitable and So Are We, which reached the 26th position on the Billboard Hot 100 in 2023.

Kelly Moran is a musical composer based in New York. She has been recognised by the New York Times for her album Bloodrot and Rolling Stone magazine for her album Ultraviolet. She played bass guitar for the band Cellular Chaos from 2012 to 2013.

Cameron Wisch has been a drummer since 1993. He was born in Bridgewood, NJ and currently resides in Brooklyn, NY. He was the drummer of the band Porches from 2010 to 2017 and was front-man of the band Cende, which released the album #1 Hit Single (Note: This is the album's title, not its status on any music popularity chart.) in 2017.

Caley Monahon-Ward is a former member of the band Extra Life as violinist.

== Discography ==
| Year | Title | Ep/Single | Featured Tracks |
|---|---|---|---|
| 2014 | In Sixths / Field and Border | EP | In Sixths |
| 2014 | In Sixths / Field and Border | EP | Field and Border |
| 2015 | Heaven's Sense Ep | EP | Heaven's Sense |
| 2015 | Heaven's Sense Ep | EP | An Atrium |
| 2015 | Heaven's Sense Ep | EP | You in a place for a While by Yourself |
| 2015 | Heaven's Sense Ep | EP | Black is the Color of My True Love's Hair |
| 2015 | You in a Place for a While by Yourself | Single | You in a place for a While by Yourself (Note: The single version of this song has a different musical arrangement and is significantly longer then the Heaven's Sense EP version, so they should both be considered different songs.) |
