= Strawberry blonde =

Strawberry-blonde or blond may refer to:

- Strawberry blonde (hair color)
- The Band Played On, also known as Casey Would Waltz with a Strawberry Blonde, an 1895 popular song
- The Strawberry Blonde, a 1941 film directed by Raoul Walsh, featuring the song above
- Strawberry Blonde (1980 film), also known as Bionda fragola, an Italian film directed by Mino Bellei
- "Strawberry Blonde", a 2008 song by The Subways from All or Nothing
- "Strawberry Blond", a 2013 song by Mitski from Retired from Sad, New Career in Business
- "Strawberry Blonde (The Band Rocked On)", a 1960 song by Frank D'Rone
- Strawberry Blonde, a variety of Helianthus (sunflower)
