= Emily Moore =

Emily Moore may refer to:

- Emily Moore (musician), American musician
- Emily Moore (soccer) (born 1998), Canadian soccer player
