= Faith Off =

- The Simpsons episode
- Episode no.: Season 11; Episode 11
- Directed by: Nancy Kruse
- Written by: Frank Mula
- Production code: BABF06
- Original air date: January 16, 2000

Guest appearances
- Don Cheadle as Brother Faith; Joe Mantegna as Fat Tony

Episode features
- Chalkboard gag: "I will stop 'phoning it in'"
- Couch gag: A psychiatrist is seated next to the couch. Homer lies down on the couch, yells, "Oh, doctor, I’m crazy!" and sobs while the rest of the family stares at each other in confusion.
- Commentary: Mike Scully; George Meyer; Matt Selman; Nancy Kruse

Episode chronology
← Previous "Little Big Mom"	Next → "The Mansion Family"
- The Simpsons season 11

"Faith Off" is the eleventh episode of the eleventh season of the American animated television series The Simpsons. It originally aired on the Fox network in the United States on January 16, 2000. In this episode, Bart believes he has the power to heal others through faith after removing a bucket glued to Homer's head. Meanwhile, Homer creates a homecoming game float for Springfield University.

The episode, which features guest appearances from Don Cheadle and Joe Mantegna, received generally positive reviews from critics following its release on home video in the season 11 DVD.

This episode was written by Frank Mula and directed by Nancy Kruse.

== Plot ==
Homer attends a Springfield University reunion party, but it is really a fundraiser and he is forced to donate. To take revenge on the dean, Homer rigs a bucket of glue to fall on his head when he opens the front door of his home. However, Homer falls victim to an identical prank set up by a fraternity. It is impossible to remove the bucket.

The Simpson family come across a preacher’s revival tent. Despite his faith, the preacher cannot remove the bucket, but he lifts up Bart to try – and he does it. The preacher declares that Bart has the gift of faith healing. Lisa’s scientific explanation that metal bucket has expanded from the heat in the tent is dismissed. Bart starts his own revival movement and has great success apparently working cures. Milhouse is convinced that Bart has cured his weak eyesight and is run over by a truck he thinks is a dog. In the hospital, powerless to cure him, Bart admits that his career as a faith healer is over.

Homer builds a float for the homecoming football game halftime show. He gets drunk and drives late onto the field, when the players are already there. He runs over Springfield U’s star place-kicker, breaking his leg. Fat Tony has made a large bet on SU and threatens to kill Homer if the team loses; Bart reluctantly prays to God for help in effecting a cure. Somehow, the player is apparently cured. He returns to the field and attempts a field goal. It looks as if it is just going to miss – but the lower half of his leg, severed, appears in the air and nudges it in. Springfield U have won. Dr. Hibbert says that, with Bart’s help, he will be able to reattach the leg. Bart wearily repeats that he has no healing powers.

== Production and themes ==
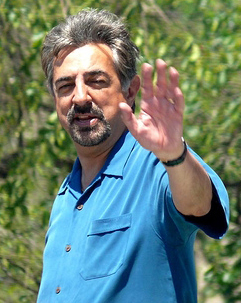
Joe Mantegna returned as Fat Tony in the episode.

"Faith Off" was written by Frank Mula and directed by Nancy Kruse as part of the eleventh season of The Simpsons (1999–2000). The episode features guest appearances from Don Cheadle as Brother Faith and Joe Mantegna as Fat Tony. A major theme in "Faith Off" is the Christian practice of faith healing. In his 2008 book The Springfield Reformation: The Simpsons, Christianity, and American Culture, Jamey Heit wrote that "The Simpsons reiterates the vibrancy that defines black Christianity in 'Faith Off.' A faith healer, Brother Faith, inspires Bart to nurture his spirituality. Bart responds to the call and at least for the rest of the episode embraces the spiritual vibrancy that he learns from a black Christian leader."

== Release and reviews ==
The episode originally aired on the Fox network in the United States on January 16, 2000. On September 4, 2000 the episode was included on the VHS compilation set The Simpsons: On Your Marks, Get Set, D'oh! On October 7, 2008, it was released on DVD as part of the box set The Simpsons – The Complete Eleventh Season. Staff members Mike Scully, George Meyer, Matt Selman, and Nancy Kruse participated in the DVD audio commentary for the episode. Deleted scenes from the episode were also included on the box set. A song Bart sings in the episode, called "Testify", was released on the soundtrack album The Simpsons: Testify in 2007.

Reception from critics has been generally positive. While reviewing the eleventh season of The Simpsons, DVD Movie Guide's Colin Jacobson commented on "Faith Off", noting: "If nothing else, I like this one for the sight of Homer with the bucket stuck on his head; something about seeing him with those little eyeholes entertains me. Otherwise there’s not much powerful at work here. The healing plot is a decent one, and Don Cheadle gives us a good guest performance. The program is fine but not much more than that."

Nancy Basile of About.com, on the other hand, listed the episode as one of the episodes she felt "shined in season eleven". Alison Kerr of The Herald called the episode "brilliant".

In his review of the eleventh season, Den of Geek critic Mark Oakley wrote that "there are some fine episodes to be found", such as "Faith Off", which he described as a "highlight". He added that the "song Testify harks back to the brilliance of the show’s great musical numbers like The Stonecutters Song." In 2003, the Orlando Sentinel's Gregory Hardy named "Faith Off" the fifth best episode of the show with a sports theme.

Jerry Greene, another Orlando Sentinel columnist, listed the episode at number seven on his 2004 list of the show's "Top 10 Sporting Episodes". He particularly liked the inscription on Springfield University's gateway that says: "If you can read this, you're accepted."

== In popular culture ==
Singer-songwriter Mitski named her 2014 album Bury Me at Makeout Creek after a quote from this episode, after Milhouse is hit by a truck.
