= Emily Moore (musician) =

- Genres: Indie, Pop
- Occupation: Musician
- Website: www.emilyannemoore.com

Emily Moore is an LA-based musician who records under the name Total Brutal, and is one-half of the pop duo, Pen Pin, with Jeni Magaña.

As a multi-instrumentalist, she has also performed with Taylor Swift, Fun, Charli XCX, Dua Lipa, and Mitski, among others.

== Biography ==
Emily Moore was born in Charlotte, North Carolina. She relocated to Los Angeles, California, and began her current career as a touring and session musician, during which she has worked with Taylor Swift, Charli XCX, Dua Lipa, Mitski, KT Tunstall, Kesha, Tim Minchin and numerous others.

Moore played keys, guitar and vocals for Fun from 2008 to 2014. During this time the band won “Song of the Year” and “Best New Band” at the 55th Annual Grammy Awards.

In 2020, Moore began writing and recording her own songs as Total Brutal. She issued ‘’Willow,’’ her first single on April 22nd 2020, and followed it “Choosy Moms,” “Egypt,” and “Everything’s Gonna Be Cool This Christmas” that same year.

In 2021, Total Brutal returned with the “Had a Feeling,” and a single of remixes of “Egypt” and “Choosy Moms” by Desert Cities. In 2024, she collaborated with Mini Saints on the “Me and You” single, which was later remixed by Zach Atom.

=== pen pin (2022 - present) ===
In 2022, Moore formed the duo, pen pin, with Jeni Magaña, who she had met whilst touring with Mitski. pen pin released their debut single, Spooky Love, on October 26, 2022, which they followed with Office Party on December 14.

They returned in 2023 with two more singles, The Fringe on August 23, and The Boredom on September 29.

In October 2026, pen pin announced the upcoming release of their debut album with another single, "Vampire." The album, Pony Up, followed on November 11th.

== Solo Discography ==
- Willow (Honey Panda Records, 2020)
- Choosy Moms (Grand Theft, 2020)
- Egypt (Honey Panda Records, 2020)
- Everything's Gonna Be Cool This Christmas (Honey Panda Records, 2020)
- Desert Cities Remixes (Honey Panda Records, 2021)
- Had a Feeling (Honey Panda Records, 2021)
