= Jeni Magaña =

Mexican-American musician

- Genres: Indie rock, pop, ambient, electronic
- Occupations: Musician, photographer
- Label: Audio Antihero / Beanie Tapes / Colored Pencils / Hand Drawn Hand / Softseed Music
- Website: www.jenimagana.com

Jeni Magaña is a Mexican-American multi-instrumentalist, producer, singer-songwriter, experimental musician, and photographer based in Los Angeles, USA. She releases solo music as Magana, and is one-half of the pop duo Pen Pin, with Emily Moore. Magaña also currently performs and records with Mitski, and has previously worked with Lady Lamb and Laura Cortese & The Dance Cards.

== Early life ==
Jeni Magaña was born in Bakersfield, California. She relocated to Boston, Massachusetts to study music at Berklee College.

== Career ==
=== Multi-Instrumentalist and Producer (2007–present) ===
As a multi-instrumentalist, Magaña has recorded and toured with a range of artists. While earning her degree at Berklee, she contributed double bass to The Meanest of Times, a 2007 studio album by Dropkick Murphys, and formed The Polaroid Truth folk duo with Jeff Fettig.

She has written, recorded, and toured with artists including Laura Cortese and The Dance Cards, Annie and The Beekeepers, Pigeon Club, Ella Vos, and Lady Lamb. She has also worked as a producer.

Magaña joined Mitski's touring lineup in 2018. Whilst touring with Mitski, Magaña has also worked as a photographer, shooting for the 2022 L'Officiel campaign, and the behind-the-scenes video for the ‘’Stay Soft’’ music video. Magaña began recording with Mitski in 2024, contributing double bass to Mitski's “Buffalo Replaced / Coyote, My Little Brother“ for the Spotify Singles series, appearing in the Mitski: This Land concert film, and the performing on the accompanying soundtrack, This Land: The Live Album. She also contributed bass and backing vocals to Mitski's "Where's My Phone?" single in January 2026.

In 2025, Magaña toured as bassist, clarinetist and backing vocalist for Tim Minchin, and as well as guitarist and keyboardist for Good Neighbours.

=== Solo works as Magana (2016–present) ===
After relocating to Brooklyn, New York, Magaña released an album with Oh Odessa, and scored the 2015 short film Beyond the Shadows, before she began working on solo material under the name Magana.

She signed to the Audio Antihero label in 2016 and released her debut solo single ‘’Get It Right’’ on September 26. The Golden Tongue EP followed on October 28.

On January 20, 2017, Magana issued the ‘’Pages’’ single.

In July 2017, after relocating to Los Angeles, California, Magaña collaborated with director Lauren Finerman on a music video for ‘’Inches Apart,’’ a song from the Golden Tongue EP. "Inches Apart" was re-released as a single with remixes by Frog and Benjamin Shaw.

Magana continued to issue singles, appear on compilations, and play on bills with Pom Pom Squad and Deep Sea Diver, before self-releasing Breathing and You Are Not a Morning Person in 2020. The latter of the two was re-issued by the Beanie Tapes label the following year.

Magana returned on March 25, 2024 with the Teeth album, which was co-released through Audio Antihero and her own Colored Pencils imprint. In October of that year, she performed at O+ Festival.

On October 4, 2024, Magana issued DREAMS, a multimedia ambient music dream diary and photography book, via Hand Drawn Hand.

On January 24, 2025, Magana released the Bad News EP through Audio Antihero. Magana performed the EP acoustically in a session airing via Chapman Radio on February 13, 2026.

=== pen pin (2022–present) ===
In 2022, Magaña formed the pen pin duo with Emily Moore. pen pin released their debut single ‘’Spooky Love’’ on October 26, 2022, with ‘’Office Party’’ following on December 14.

They returned in 2023 with two more singles, ‘’The Fringe’’ on August 23, and ‘’The Boredom’’ on September 29.

In October 2026, pen pin announced the upcoming release of their debut album with another single, "Vampire." The album, Pony Up, followed on November 11th.

== Discography ==
=== Albums and EPs ===
- Golden Tongue EP (Audio Antihero, 2016)
- Breathing (Self-Released, 2020)
- You Are Not a Morning Person (Self-Released, 2020 / Beanie Tapes, 2021)
- To Sleep To Dream EP (Self-Released, 2022)
- Teeth (Audio Antihero / Colored Pencils, 2024)
- DREAMS (Hand Drawn Hand, 2024)
- Bad News EP (2025)

=== Compilations ===
- Golden Tongue + Bad News (Softseed Music, 2025)

=== Singles ===
- "Get It Right" (Audio Antihero, 2016)
- "Pages" (Audio Antihero, 2017)
- "Oceans" (Audio Antihero, 2017)
- "Inches Apart" (Audio Antihero, 2017)
- "No More Friends" [Solo] (Self-Released, 2020)
- "Jenny Don't Leave" (Self-Released, 2020)
- "Girl in Chains" (Colored Pencils, 2023)
- "Afraid of Everybody" (Colored Pencils, 2023)
- "Beside You" (Colored Pencils, 2023)
- "Paul" (Audio Antihero / Colored Pencils, 2024)
- "Break Free" (Audio Antihero / Colored Pencils, 2024)

=== Compilation appearances ===
- Audio Antihero Presents: "Unpresidented Jams" for SPLC & NILC - (Audio Antihero, 2017) - contributes "Be the Same"
- The Desperation Club - A Cloud Tribute Compilation - (Audio Antihero, 2018) - contributes "Tastes Bad"
- The Creamery Mixtape 2.0 (The Creamery Studio, 2018) - contributes "Trouble And I"
- Elder Statesman: Nine Long Years of Audio Antihero Records (Audio Antihero, 2019) - contributes "Inches Apart"
- From the River to the Sea: The Horrible Truth About Palestine - a Fundraiser for the United Palestinian Appeal (Audio Antihero, 2021) - contributes "Say My Name"
- Vinyl Moon Vol.116: Upper Stories (Vinyl Moon, 2025) – contributes "Half to Death"

=== Collaborations ===
- "Coney Island Kids" - with Van Bellman (Self-Released, 2022)

=== Other credits ===
- Dropkick Murphys – The Meanest of Times (Born & Bred Records, 2007) - Double bass
- Sydney Wayser – Silent Parade (Self-Released, 2007) - Bass (track 1)
- MILES – As Fast As You Can (Self-Released, 2010) - Photography
- Rugged N Raw – Anomaly Book 1 (Raw Impaq Productions, 2012) - Bass (Track 7)
- Silvina Moreno – Mañana (Self-Released, 2012) - Bass
- Annie and the Beekeepers – My Bonneville (Self-Released, 2012) - Double bass (tracks 1 and 9) and backing vocals
- Gina's Picture Show – Gina's Picture Show (Self-Released, 2012) – Double bass and electric bass
- Baum – «2013» (Baummusic, 2013) - Backing vocals (track 5)
- JJ Byars – Waterlogged (Self-Released, 2016) - Clarinet
- Caitlin Mahoney – Story Still Left to Be Told (Self-Released, 2017) - Bass and photography
- Blaze McKenzie – Born a Shadow (Medical Records, 2018) - Double bass
- Matt Suchich – The Creamery Mixtape 2.0 (The Creamery Studio, 2018) - Bass (track 5)
- Burn the Ships – Truth (Self-Released, 2018) - Bass
- Laura Cortese & the Dance Cards – Bitter Better (Compass Records, 2020) - Composition (tracks 1-2, 5), guitar, bass, and backing vocals
- Rabib Rafiq – "Cold River" Singel (Hand Over Foot Records, 2020) - Clarinet
- Jonah the Unaccompanied - "Spinning Katarinas" Single (Shades of Shame Music, 2021) - Bass
- Sparkbird – "Minor Holiday" Single (Nettwerk Music Group, 2021) - Double bass
- Guy Welles – Incognito (Self-Released, 2021) - Double bass (tracks. 1-3, 5)
- Sparkbird – "Rainbow Connection" Single (Nettwerk Music Group, 2022) - Bass
- UHL – "Miss United States" (Self-Released, 2022) - Bass
- Whitney Lockert – "Long Way to California" Single (Self-Released, 2022) - Photography
- Kate Hannington – "Nothing to Fear" Single (Calamity Music, 2022) - Additional production, bass and synth
- Whitney Lockert – Long Way to California (Self-Released, 2022) - Photography
- Mitski – "Stay Soft" - Music Video (Dead Oceans, 2022) – Behind-the-scenes footage
- Kate Hannington – "Palm Reader" Single (Calamity Music, 2022) - Additional production, bass and synth
- Annie Oaksong – "Glacial Blue" Single (Self-Released, 2022) - Bass
- Kate Hannington – Chiromancy (Calamity Music, 2022) - Additional production, bass and synth
- Emily James – "Bird of Prey" Single (Nettwerk Music Group, 2022) - Bass (Track 1)
- Ella Vos – "Mindreader (Live in Studio)" Single (Self-Released, 2023) - Keyboards and backing vocals
- BenBen – Sincere Gifts (Perpetual Doom, 2023) - Co-producer, backing vocals, clarinet, synth, bass guitar, acoustic guitar and classical guitar
- Sparkbird – "Disembodied Mind" Single (Nettwerk Music Group, 2023) - Bass
- Ella Vos – "Superglue (Live in Studio)" Single (Superglue Records, 2023) - Keyboards and backing vocals
- Pigeon Club – Pigeon Club (B&F Loft, 2021) - Clarinet (track 8) and photography
- Sparkbird – "Disembodied Mind" Single (Nettwerk Music Group, 2023) - Bass
- Sparkbird – "Sparkbird" Single (Nettwerk Music Group, 2023) - Double bass
- Sparkbird – "November" Single (Nettwerk Music Group, 2023) - Bass
- Pigeon Club – "Liar" Single (B&F Loft, 2024) - vocals
- Caitlin Mahoney – Name What I Need (Warehouse 507 Music, 2024) - Co-writer (tracks 1 and 3), co-producer (tracks 1, 3, 9), acoustic guitar, electric guitar, percussion, synth, bass, and keys
- Sparkbird – Minor Holiday (Nettwerk Music Group, 2024) - Double bass and electric bass (tracks 1-3, 6, 8)
- Photocomfort – Patron Saint (Self-Released, 2024) - Bass (track 3)
- Caitlin Mahoney – "Balance" Music Video (Warehouse 507 Music, 2024) - Camera operator
- Mitski – Spotify Singles (Dead Oceans, 2024) - Bass
- Sparkbird – "Wooden" Single (Nettwerk Music Group, 2025) - Double bass
- closing. – VI (Unfathomless, 2025) - Double bass
- Sparkbird – Head Like a Nest (Nettwerk Music Group, 2025) - Double bass and electric bass (tracks 1-2, 5, 9, 13)
- Mitski – The Land: The Live Album (Dead Oceans, 2025) - Bass
- Mitski – "Where's My Phone?" Single (Dead Oceans, 2026) - Bass and backing vocals
- Safe Jazz – "Inexplicably, Bubbles" Single (Pop Can Records, 2026) - Clarinet
- Mitski – "I'll Change for You" Single (Dead Oceans, 2026) - Bass
- Mitski – Nothing's About to Happen to Me (Dead Oceans, 2026) - Double bass, electric bass and backing vocals
- Leilani Patao – daisy deluxe (Audio Antihero, 2026) - remixer (Track 12)

=== pen pin Discography ===
- "Spooky Love" - single (Self-Released, 2022)
- "Office Party" - single (Self-Released, 2022)
- "Fringe" - single (Self-Released, 2023)
- "The Boredom" - single (Self-Released, 2023)
- "Vampire" - single (Colored Pencils, 2026)
- Pony Up (Colored Pencils, 2026)

=== Oh Odessa Discography ===
- Oh Odessa (Self-Released, 2012)

=== Polaroid Truth Discography ===
- Last Day as Children (Self-Released, 2008)

== Film and Television Credits ==
=== Composer ===
- Beyond the Shadows (Short Film / 2015)

=== Performer ===
- Jimmy Kimmel Live! (Television / 2018) - Self (bass)
- Austin City Limits (Television / 2020) - Self (bass)
- Jimmy Kimmel Live! (Television / 2022) - Self (bass)
- Mitski: The Land (Feature Concert Film / 2025) - Self (bass)
