= Premonitions (album) =

Studio album by Miya Folick
- Released: October 26, 2018
- Genre: Pop
- Labels: Interscope; Terrible
- Producers: Justin Raisen; Yves Rothman

Miya Folick chronology
Premonitions (2018)	Roach (2023)

Premonitions is the debut studio album by American musician Miya Folick. In September 2018, the single "Stop Talking" was released and supporting music video. The album was released on October 26, 2018.

== Critical reception ==
Professional ratings
Aggregate scores
Source	Rating
AnyDecentMusic?	7.5/10
Metacritic	84/100
Review scores
Source	Rating
DIY	4/5 stars
Exclaim!	8/10
Loud and Quiet	6/10
NME	4/5 stars
Paste	8.6/10
Pitchfork	8.1/10
The Skinny	4/5 stars

Premonitions was released to critical acclaim, with music critics praising Folick's vocal ability and the songwriting. On Metacritic, the album has an average rating of 84/100, indicating "universal acclaim".

Margaret Farrell, writing for Pitchfork, praised Folick's singing, calling her voice, "deep and broad and rich, yet capable of soaring to fluttering soprano heights."

== Track listing ==
Premonitions track listing
No.	Title	Writer(s)	Length
1.	"Thingamajig"	Miya Folick; Luke Niccoli; Justin Raisen	4:12
2.	"Premonitions"	Folick; Niccoli; Raisen; Yves Rothman	3:46
3.	"Cost Your Love"	Folick; Niccoli; Raisen; Rothman	3:12
4.	"Stock Image"	Folick; Niccoli; Raisen; Rothman	3:52
5.	"Leave the Party"	Folick; Niccoli; Jeremiah Raisen; Justin Raisen; Rothman	2:40
6.	"Stop Talking"	Folick; Robin Braun	2:45
7.	"Freak Out"	Folick; Niccoli; Justin Raisen; Rothman	2:43
8.	"Deadbody"	Folick; Justin Raisen	3:24
9.	"Baby Girl"	Folick; Niccoli; Justin Raisen; Rothman	4:03
10.	"What We've Made"	Folick; Niccoli; Justin Raisen; Rothman	4:00
