= Miya Folick =

American singer-songwriter

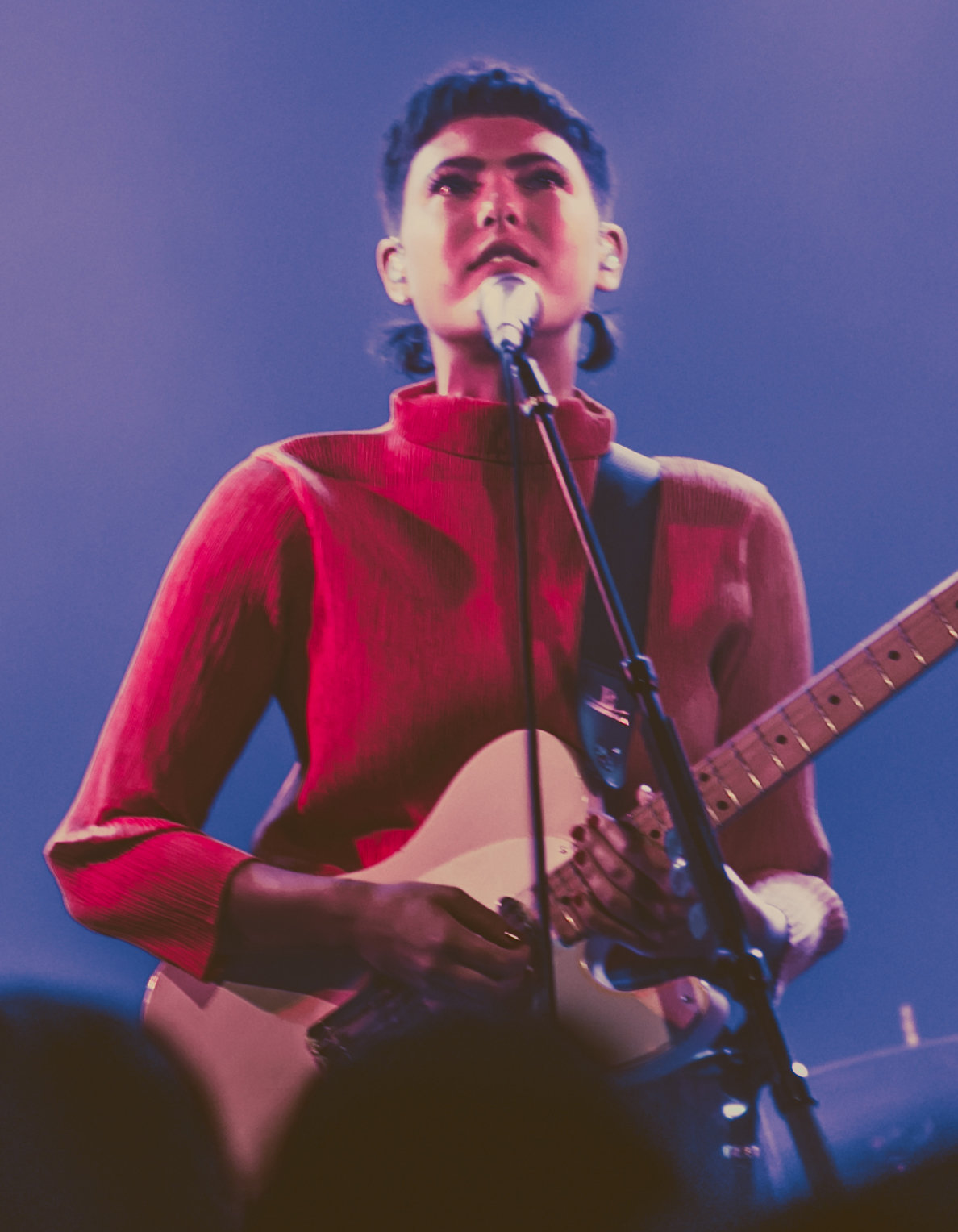
- Miya Folick

Background information
- Born: Miya Folick; June 9, 1989 (age 37); Santa Ana, California U.S.
- Origin: Los Angeles, California
- Genres: Folk rock; indie rock; indie pop
- Occupations: Singer-songwriter; musician
- Instruments: Vocals; guitar
- Years active: 2014–present
- Website: miyafolick.com

Miya Folick (/ˈmiːjəˈfoʊlɪk/ MEE-yə FOH-lik; born June 9, 1989) is an American singer-songwriter based in Los Angeles, California.

== Early life and education ==
Folick was born in Santa Ana, California. She is half-Japanese and was raised as a Jōdo Shinshū Buddhist, learning to play the taiko drums in a church group.

Folick went to Foothill High School in Santa Ana, California, where she was on the basketball team and graduated in 2007. She has said she didn't enjoy playing basketball.

Folick attended New York University from 2007 to 2009 to study acting but transferred in 2009 and graduated from the University of Southern California in 2011 with a B.A. from the School of Theatre. During a gap semester, a high school friend taught her how to play guitar.

== Career ==
Folick released her debut EP, Strange Darling, in December 2015. The EP was followed by two singles, "Pet Body" (2) and "God Is a Woman" in 2016 prior to the release of her second EP Give It To Me, which was released in November 2017 by Terrible Records.

In September 2018, Folick released the new song "Stop Talking" and supporting music video. She released her debut album, Premonitions on October 26, 2018 to critical acclaim.

Folick joined the bands Pale Waves and Sunflower Bean on a United States and European tour in fall 2018.

In the fall of 2019, Folick toured with Bishop Briggs through the United States.

In 2022, Folick was featured in American Football's cover of Fade Into You.

On February 28, 2025, Folick released the album Erotica Veronica.

== Personal life ==
Folick dated musician K.Flay (Kristine Meredith Flaherty) from 2018-2021.

== Discography ==
=== Studio albums ===
Title	Details
Premonitions	Released: October 26, 2018; Label: Terrible; Formats: LP; cassette; digital download; streaming
Roach	Released: May 26, 2023; Label: Nettwerk; Formats: LP; cassette; digital download; streaming
Erotica Veronica	Released: February 28, 2025; Label: Nettwerk; Formats: LP; digital download; streaming

=== Extended plays ===
Title	Details
Strange Darling	Released: December 10, 2015; Label: Self-released; Formats: CD; cassette; digital download; streaming
Give It to Me	Released: November 3, 2017; Label: Terrible; Formats: Digital download; streaming
2007	Released: September 9, 2022; Label: Nettwerk; Formats: Digital download; streaming

=== Compilation albums ===
Title	Details
Give It to Me / Strange Darling	Released: November 2017; Label: Terrible; Formats: LP

=== Singles ===
List of singles, showing year released and album name
Title	Year	Album
"Pet Body"	2016	Non-album singles
"God Is a Woman"	2016	Non-album singles
"Trouble Adjusting"	2017	Give It to Me
"Deadbody"|	2018	Premonitions
"Stock Image"	2018	Premonitions
"Stop Talking"	2018	Premonitions
"Freak Out"	2018	Premonitions
"Thingamajig"	2018	Premonitions
"Malibu Barbie"	2019	Non-album single
"I Will Follow You into the Dark"	2019	Looking for Alaska (Music from the Original Series)
"California (Prius Edition)" (Petey & Miya Folick)	2020	High Life from the Bottle on the Beach

=== Guest appearances ===
Title	Year	Other artists	Album
"Aging"	2016	—N/a	The Creamery Mixtape, Vol. 1
"Joy Stops Time"	2018	Fucked Up	Dose Your Dreams
