= Lush (Mitski album) =

Studio album by Mitski
- Released: January 31, 2012
- Genre: Chamber pop
- Length: 26:01
- Label: Self-released
- Producer: Scot Moriarty

Mitski chronology
| Lush (2012) | Retired from Sad, New Career in Business (2013) |

Lush is the debut studio album by American musician Mitski. Mitski self-released the album on January 31, 2012, as her junior year project at SUNY Purchase's Conservatory of Music. It was recorded and mixed by Scot Moriarty.

== Background ==
Mitski described the album as by "someone who simply wrote her feelings and didn't think about how her narrative was being conveyed", describing a version of herself that is "long gone now". Patrick Hyland, producer of all of Mitski's subsequent albums, described the album with the quote: "Lush was in college, like, 'Oh, my gosh, there are studios! There are other instrumentalists!"

The album is primarily chamber pop, with elements of lo-fi and punk rock. Lush has been described as "mournful" by Rolling Stone. It is "her most piano-laden work," characterized by Nylon as "a series of vivid, smooth, and unraveling narratives."

== Critical reception ==
In a career retrospective following her 2018 studio album Be the Cowboy, Jesse Herb of Atwood Magazine said that the album "plays out like a beautiful stream of consciousness" and praised Mitski's poetic lyricism.

== Track listing ==
Original Bandcamp version/re-release version
| No. | Title | Length |
|---|---|---|
| 1. | "Liquid Smooth" | 2:49 |
| 2. | "Eric" | 3:17 |
| 3. | "Brand New City" | 2:12 |
| 4. | "Real Men" | 2:41 |
| 5. | "Wife" | 2:39 |
| 6. | "Abbey" | 2:46 |
| 7. | "Bag of Bones" | 4:36 |
| 8. | "Door" | 2:12 |
| 9. | "Pearl Diver" | 2:44 |
| Total length: | | 26:01 |

All tracks are written by Mitski

Current Bandcamp version
| No. | Title | Length |
|---|---|---|
| 1. | "Liquid Smooth" | 2:49 |
| 2. | "Wife" | 2:39 |
| 3. | "Abbey" | 2:49 |
| 4. | "Brand New City" | 2:12 |
| 5. | "Eric" | 3:17 |
| 6. | "Bag of Bones" | 4:36 |
| 7. | "Door" | 2:12 |
| 8. | "Pearl Diver" | 2:44 |
| Total length: | | 23:15 |

In July 2022, the track listing on streaming services was modified to match the current Bandcamp version, with "Real Men" moved to the end of the album. Sometime in late 2012 – early 2013, "Real Men" was removed from the Bandcamp tracklist and the tracklist was re-arranged.
