= Roach (album) =

Studio album by Miya Folick
- Released: May 26, 2023
- Genre: Indie rock; pop

Miya Folick chronology
Premonitions (2018)	Roach (2023)

Professional ratings
Aggregate scores
Source	Rating
Metacritic	80/100
Review scores
Source	Rating
Under the Radar	8.5/10 stars
DIY	4/5
Exclaim!	8/10
Pitchfork	7.4/10
The Line of Best Fit	7/10

Roach is the second studio album by American indie rock musician Miya Folick.

== Track listing ==
All tracks are written by Miya Folick.

Roach track listing
No.	Title	Length
1.	"Oh God"	2:33
2.	"Bad Thing"	3:22
3.	"Get Out of My House"	3:32
4.	"Nothing to See"	3:34
5.	"Drugs or People"	2:45
6.	"Mommy"	3:07
7.	"2007"	4:09
8.	"Cockroach"	2:43
9.	"Tetherball"	3:16
10.	"Cartoon Clouds"	3:10
11.	"So Clear"	3:32
12.	"Ordinary"	2:52
13.	"Shortstop"	3:20
Total length:		42:53
