= First Love / Late Spring =

2014 single by Mitski

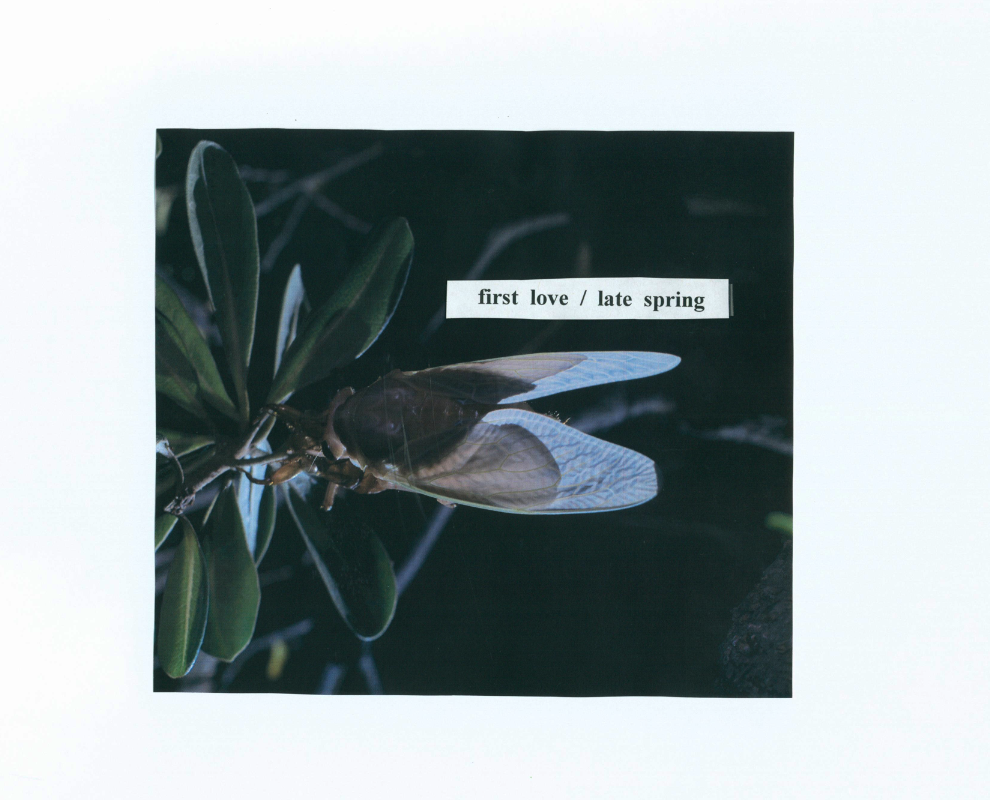

Single by Mitski

from the album Bury Me at Makeout Creek
- Released: May 15, 2014
- Genre: Indie rock; alternative rock; synth-pop; space rock
- Length: 4:38
- Label: Double Double Whammy
- Songwriter: Mitski
- Producer: Patrick Hyland

Mitski singles chronology
"First Love / Late Spring" (2014)	"Townie" (2014)

Audio video
- "First Love / Late Spring" on YouTube

"First Love / Late Spring" is the debut single by American singer Mitski, released in 2014 as the lead single from her third studio album, Bury Me at Makeout Creek.

== Background ==
In an interview with Drew Allen, Mitski said that she got the inspiration for the song from real life. "I was falling in love with someone when I seriously could not afford to, considering where my life was at the moment. But it happened anyway because you can't control that shit", she said. When asked about what the line "胸がはち切れそうで" (romanized as "Mune ga hachikire-sōde") means, Mitski said "it roughly means 'my chest is about to burst'."

== Reception ==
AllMusic considered "First Love / Late Spring" to be one of the album's highlights, and wrote that it adopts a "mocking, '60s girl group approximation".

Consequence placed the song on the fifth spot of their top 10 Mitski songs list, writing that "the chorus layered with group vocals [makes it] seem to mimic her blithering dread."

== Certifications ==
Certifications for "First Love / Late Spring"
Region	Certification	Certified units/sales
New Zealand (RMNZ)	Gold	15,000^{‡}
United Kingdom (BPI)	Silver	200,000^{‡}
United States (RIAA)	Gold	500,000^{‡}
^{‡} Sales+streaming figures based on certification alone.
