= Bury Me at Makeout Creek =

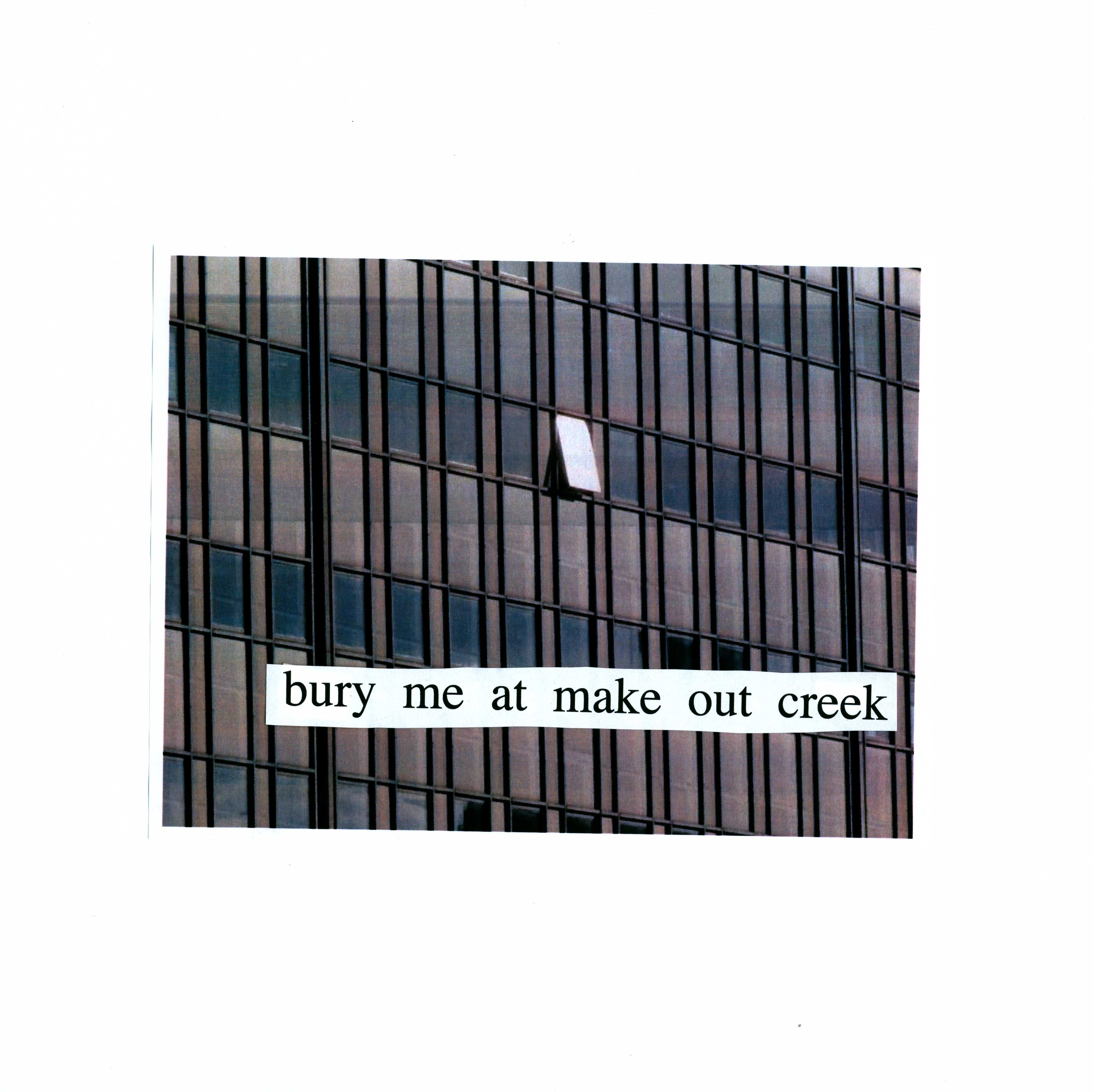

Studio album by Mitski
- Released: November 11, 2014
- Genre: Indie rock
- Length: 30:14
- Labels: Double Double Whammy; Don Giovanni
- Producer: Patrick Hyland

Mitski chronology
Retired from Sad, New Career in Business (2013)	Bury Me at Makeout Creek (2014)	Puberty 2 (2016)

Singles from Bury Me at Makeout Creek
- 1. "First Love / Late Spring" Released: May 15, 2014; 2. "Townie" Released: September 16, 2014; 3. "I Don't Smoke" Released: September 29, 2014; 4. "I Will" Released: October 21, 2014

Bury Me at Makeout Creek (stylized in all lowercase) is the third studio album by American indie rock musician Mitski, released through Double Double Whammy on November 11, 2014. The album was written entirely by Mitski, with production handled by Patrick Hyland, who also produced her previous record, Retired from Sad, New Career in Business (2013).

== Background and release ==
After graduating from Purchase College's Conservatory of Music, where she studied studio compositions and released her first two albums as student projects, Mitski learned to play the guitar and began work on her third studio album. The projects, combined with completing her degree while working outside jobs to pay rent, left Mitski exhausted, a state which heavily influenced the creation of the album. The album was recorded mostly in houses and makeshift studios with a select group of musicians and friends and represented a departure from Mitski's classical training showcased in her orchestral, piano-based first two albums.

The lead single of the album, "First Love / Late Spring", was released on May 15, 2014, with Double Double Whammy announcing Mitski joined their label roster and will release a full-length record later that year. The album was announced on September 16 alongside the release of the second single, "Townie". Two music videos were released for "Townie", the first directed by Allyssa Yohana and premiered on Rookie on November 9, 2014, and the second directed by Faye Orlove and premiered on The Fader on March 9, 2015. She released two more singles, "I Don't Smoke" on September 29 and "I Will" on October 21.

The album was reissued with four new bonus tracks on April 7, 2015, through Don Giovanni Records. In 2016, the album was released under Mitski's new label Dead Oceans.

== Songs ==
"Texas Reznikoff" is the first track on the album. It was named after American poet Charles Reznikoff and makes reference to a fictionalized version of Texas as a "landlocked state" as well as multiple references to New York (both city and state). Mitski has said in a since-deleted tweet that calling Texas a "landlocked state" was an inside joke with a former lover and was not meant to make sense in the context of the song. As of 2026, it has never been performed live.

"Townie" is about "being a girl with a feeling like she should be going somewhere, doing something, taking something big for herself, but always ending up just going to the same parties and doing stupid things over and over because that's the only way she knows how to find release, and the only role she knows how to fill. It's about being stuck, being impatient, being bored to death, being angry with what you've been given, and being young and soft and defiant inside and not knowing what to do with that." Its animated music video was directed by Faye Orlove.

"First Love / Late Spring" is about Mitski "falling in love with someone when [she] seriously could not afford to, considering where [her] life was at the moment."

"Francis Forever" was written about someone Mitski was infatuated with in New York City (Francis is the person's middle name). The song appeared in an episode of the Cartoon Network show Adventure Time with the character Marceline performing a cover of it, leading the show's fans to believe the song was originally written for the show and that Mitski herself was the cover artist.

"I Don't Smoke", unlike other songs on the album, was recorded and performed using a drum machine rather than acoustic drums.

"Jobless Monday" is about the struggle of being an artist in the New York City economy, where rent is so expensive that recording artists can only consider making music that is commercially viable for major labels, in order to pay their bills.

"Drunk Walk Home" is about being "broke and mad." The screaming heard at the end of the song was initially that of producer Patrick Hyland, as Mitski didn't want to damage her vocal chords, but ultimately she decided to do it herself which she felt was "liberating."

"Last Words of a Shooting Star" was inspired by American poet John Giorno, who himself used techniques of American writer William S. Burroughs.

== Critical reception ==
Professional ratings
Review scores
Source	Rating
AllMusic	4.5/5 stars
Consequence of Sound	B
Pitchfork	7.7/10
Rolling Stone	3.5/5 stars

Bury Me at Makeout Creek received acclaim from music critics. Writing for Pitchfork, Ian Cohen said, "though not necessarily nostalgic, the sound of Bury Me at Makeout Creek, the impressive third album from Mitski Miyawaki, is inventive and resourceful in a '90s-indie way," concluding the review saying the album "still sounds like a breakthrough even if nothing's coming up Mitski in these songs." Consequence of Sound's Sasha Geffen said "love and death and violence all smash into each other throughout the record, which delicately balances on a thin line between polished, academic pop music and unhinged punk rock," adding: "Mitski's grip on melody, pacing, and composition is tight from years of practice, but the raw energy with which she applies it is what brings Make Out Creek to life. Her courage as a musician distinguishes her more than any amount of training. Here, it's on full display." Rolling Stone's Paula Mejia wrote, "Bury Me is edged with heavy riffs that at various times recall Black Sabbath and even Liz Phair. But it's Mitski's talent for penning deep-cutting lyrics that makes this album soar."

Concluding the review for AllMusic, Marcy Donelson called the album an "auspicious if fatalistic label debut" and described it as "grungy, impulsive, and with memorably acerbic, vulnerable lyrics."

== In popular culture ==
The song "Francis Forever" was covered by Marceline the Vampire Queen in the episode "The Music Hole" from the eighth season of Adventure Time.

The title of the album is a quote from the Simpsons episode "Faith Off".

== Track listing ==
All tracks are written by Mitski Miyawaki.

Bury Me at Makeout Creek track listing
No.	Title	Length
1.	"Texas Reznikoff"	2:12
2.	"Townie"	3:25
3.	"First Love / Late Spring"	4:38
4.	"Francis Forever"	2:29
5.	"I Don't Smoke"	3:18
6.	"Jobless Monday"	2:06
7.	"Drunk Walk Home"	2:35
8.	"I Will"	2:54
9.	"Carry Me Out"	3:53
10.	"Last Words of a Shooting Star"	2:44
Total length:		30:14

Re-release bonus tracks
No.	Title	Length
11.	"Square" (live solo piano version)	3:10
12.	"I Want You" (live at WNYU The Sound Between)	3:05
13.	"Francis Forever" (live at WNYU The Sound Between)	2:51
14.	"Last Words of a Shooting Star" (live at WNYU The Sound Between)	2:47
Total length:		42:07

== Personnel ==
Credits adapted from the album's liner notes. (Note: The album's liner notes don't specify who played what instrument and simply credit Mitski, Hyland, Linehan, and Prinzi for performance.)

- Mitski – music, performance, album art
- Patrick Hyland – production, performance, additional vocals, mastering
- Patrick Linehan – performance
- Will Prinzi – performance
- Dave Benton – additional vocals
- John Molfetas – additional vocals

== Charts ==
Chart performance for Bury Me at Makeout Creek
Chart (2022–2025)	Peak position
Lithuanian Albums (AGATA)	65
Scottish Albums (Official Charts)	78
UK Independent Albums (Official Charts)	40
US Indie Store Album Sales (Billboard)	20

== Certifications ==
Certifications for Bury Me at Makeout Creek
Region	Certification	Certified units/sales
United Kingdom (BPI)	Silver	60,000^{‡}
United States (RIAA)	Gold	500,000^{‡}
^{‡} Sales+streaming figures based on certification alone.
