= Retired from Sad, New Career in Business =

Studio album by Mitski
- Released: August 1, 2013
- Length: 23:54
- Label: Self-released
- Producer: Patrick Hyland

Mitski chronology
Lush (2012)	Retired from Sad, New Career in Business (2013)	Bury Me at Makeout Creek (2014)

Retired from Sad, New Career in Business is the second studio album by American musician Mitski. Mitski recorded the project in 2013 while studying music at State University of New York at Purchase. The album was her senior project and featured a 60-piece student orchestra. Every song on the album was accompanied by a music video, each video playing a part in an ongoing story, making it a visual album. In summer 2020, the track "Strawberry Blond" gained popularity on the social media app TikTok, specifically in the cottagecore community.

== Critical reception ==
Retired from Sad, New Career in Business received praise for its blend of "out-of-the-norm orchestral sounds with electronics and 'found' sounds". In a career retrospective following Mitski's 2018 studio album Be the Cowboy, Jesse Herb of Atwood Magazine said that the album "completely highlights Mitski's writing growth in just one year, and also her impeccable composition" and that the album "could be in an off-broadway musical." Herb singled out "Shame", "Circle", and "Strawberry Blond" in particular, saying that the latter "feels like a lost Dar Williams record".

== Track listing ==
All tracks are written by Mitski.

Original Bandcamp version and revised 2022 version (Note: In July 2022, the track listing on streaming services was revised to match the original Bandcamp version, with acoustic versions of Square and Shame omitted. These versions of the tracks are since unavailable on streaming services.)
No.	Title	Length
1.	"Goodbye, My Danish Sweetheart"	2:17
2.	"Square"	3:10
3.	"Strawberry Blond"	1:54
4.	"Humpty"	3:21
5.	"I Want You"	3:03
6.	"Shame"	2:24
7.	"Because Dreaming Costs Money, My Dear"	3:05
8.	"Circle"	2:51
9.	"Class of 2013"	1:49
Total length:		23:54

Re-release version
No.	Title	Length
1.	"Goodbye, My Danish Sweetheart"	2:17
2.	"Shame"	2:24
3.	"Because Dreaming Costs Money, My Dear"	3:05
4.	"Humpty"	3:21
5.	"Circle"	2:51
6.	"I Want You"	3:03
7.	"Square"	3:10
8.	"Strawberry Blond"	1:54
9.	"Class of 2013"	1:49
10.	"Square" (solo piano version)	3:10
11.	"Shame" (Jammin' Out Solo version)	2:33
Total length:		29:40

== Personnel ==
Credits adapted from Bandcamp.

- Mitski – songwriting, vocals, piano, drums
- Trevor Fedele – recording engineer
- Patrick Hyland – recording engineer, mixing engineer, mastering engineer
- Will Prinzi – acoustic guitar, electric guitar, bass
- Mike Rasimas – drums
- Scott Interrante – orchestrations
- Sean Mcverry – gang vocals
- Eli Wolf-Christensen – gang vocals, mandolin
- Kenneth "Kenny" Trotter – violin
- Sarah Wolffe – violin
- Michael Mandrin – violin
- Sophie Dolamore – viola
- Naseer François Ashraf – viola
- Elise Linder – cello
- Pete Olynciw – upright bass
- Kevin Schmid – upright bass
- Julie Yeaeun Lee – flute
- Andrew Cowie – clarinet, bass clarinet
- John Cummings – trumpet
- Jerome Burns – trumpet, cornet
- Rich Liverano – trombone
- Cristian Uraga – French horn
- Jade Greene – album cover photography
- Pixel (as Pixie Doll) – cover model
- Emily Grigsby – album cover design
