= Mitski =

American singer-songwriter (born 1990)

Background information
- Also known as: Mitski Miyawaki
- Born: Mitsuki Laycock; September 27, 1990 (age 36); Mie Prefecture, Japan
- Origin: New York City, U.S.
- Genres: Indie rock; art pop; indie pop
- Occupations: Singer-songwriter; musician
- Instruments: Vocals; guitar; bass; piano
- Years active: 2012–present
- Labels: Dead Oceans; Don Giovanni; Double Double Whammy
- Formerly of: Voice Coils
- Website: mitski.com

Mitski Miyawaki (born Mitsuki Laycock; September 27, 1990), known professionally as Mitski, is an American musician and singer-songwriter. She self-released her first two albums, Lush (2012), and Retired from Sad, New Career in Business (2013), while studying composition at Purchase College's Conservatory of Music. Her third studio album, Bury Me at Makeout Creek, was released in 2014 on the label Double Double Whammy.

In 2015, Mitski signed with Dead Oceans and released Puberty 2 (2016), Be the Cowboy (2018), and Laurel Hell (2022), the last of which made the top ten in several countries. In 2022, The Guardian dubbed her the best young songwriter in the US. That same year, she co-composed "This Is a Life" with Son Lux for the film Everything Everywhere All at Once, which earned her an Academy Award nomination for Best Original Song. Her seventh studio album, The Land Is Inhospitable and So Are We, was released in 2023. Its single "My Love Mine All Mine" was Mitski's first to chart on the Billboard Hot 100. Her eighth studio album, Nothing's About to Happen to Me, was released on February 27, 2026, earning Mitski her first Grammy Award nomination for Best Recording Package.

== Early life ==
Mitsuki Laycock was born on September 27, 1990, in Mie Prefecture, Japan, to a Japanese mother and White American father. She has a younger sister. Mitski's mother, wanting her daughter to be born a Japanese citizen, (Note: Though according to Japanese nationality law, she had to renounce her Japanese citizenship at age 22 because their law does not allow dual citizenship after that age (which has since been reduced to 20 as of 2022). Therefore, Mitski is only an American citizen now.) flew while pregnant from the Democratic Republic of the Congo to Japan so Mitski would be born there, nearly giving birth mid-flight. She learned Japanese as her first language, and later adopted her mother's last name, Miyawaki.

Due to her father's career in the United States Department of State, she frequently relocated throughout her childhood, living in 13 different countries and changing schools on a near-yearly basis. She later recalled the constant moving as creating "a permanent sense of being a foreigner and an outsider." Her childhood musical influences included her father's extensive Smithsonian Folkways collection and her mother's Japanese pop albums. Growing up listening to American pop artists who gained popularity abroad such as Mariah Carey, Christina Aguilera, Britney Spears and NSYNC, Mitski's music tastes developed after discovering Jeff Buckley, and later, Björk, M.I.A. and Sheena Ringo.

After arriving in the United States for the first time when she was 15, she attended high school in Alabama and Virginia. She graduated from high school in Ankara, Turkey a semester early, and began songwriting at the age of 17 or 18 (Note: Mitski has provided both ages in interviews, though she recounts how she once "made up a song to myself about how excited I was to go to school" at a bus stop in first or second grade.) during her spare time, writing what would become "Bag of Bones" from her debut album, Lush, as her first song. She moved to New York in 2010 and majored in film at Hunter College for a year, though she left the program due to a perceived lack of creative job opportunities in the field, instead favoring music.

== Career ==
=== 2012–2017: Student albums, Bury Me at Makeout Creek and Puberty 2 ===
After her time at Hunter, Mitski transferred to Purchase College, where she studied studio composition at the Conservatory of Music. Making use of the recording studios available at the conservatory, she recorded there for her end-of-term project during her junior year. She self-released it as her debut studio album, Lush, through Bandcamp on January 31, 2012. While at Purchase, she met longtime musical collaborator Patrick Hyland, who has produced all of her albums after Lush.

Having previously working with student musicians on Lush, Mitski collaborated with a 60-person student orchestra for her senior project. She self-released Retired from Sad, New Career in Business as her second studio album on Bandcamp on August 1, 2013. Mitski graduated from Purchase in 2013, receiving a Bachelor of Music (MusB) degree. After graduating, she moved to Brooklyn; no longer having an orchestra at her disposal, she taught herself how to play the guitar. She additionally served as the vocalist for the short-lived progressive metal band Voice Coils.

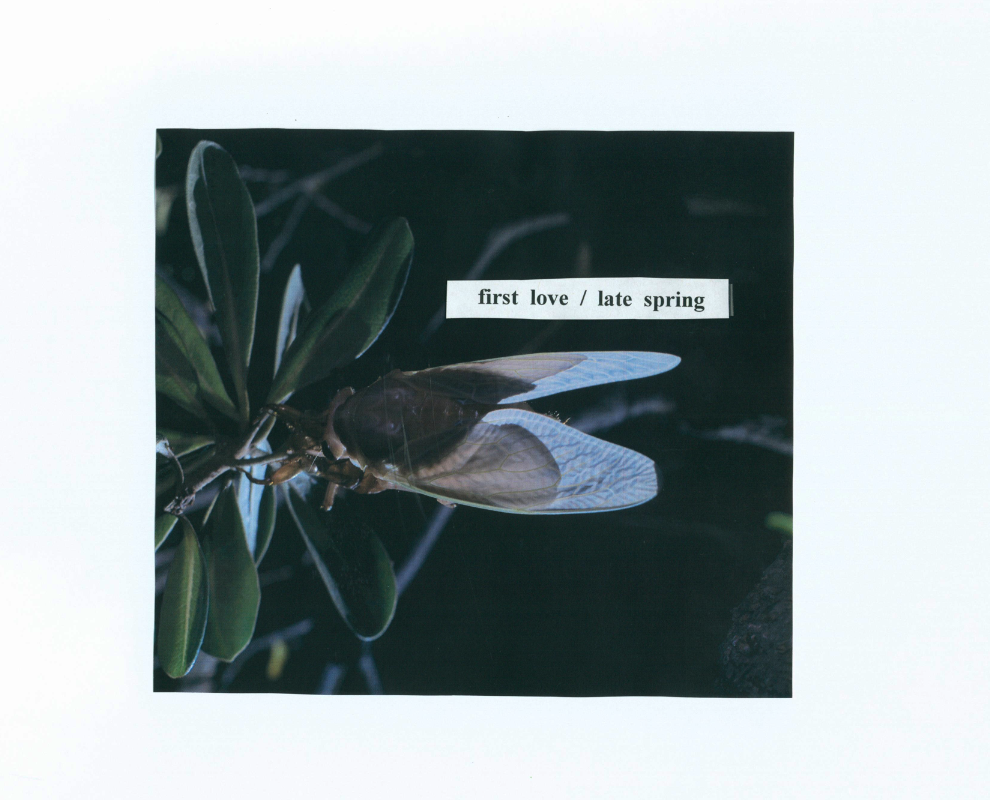
"First Love / Late Spring"

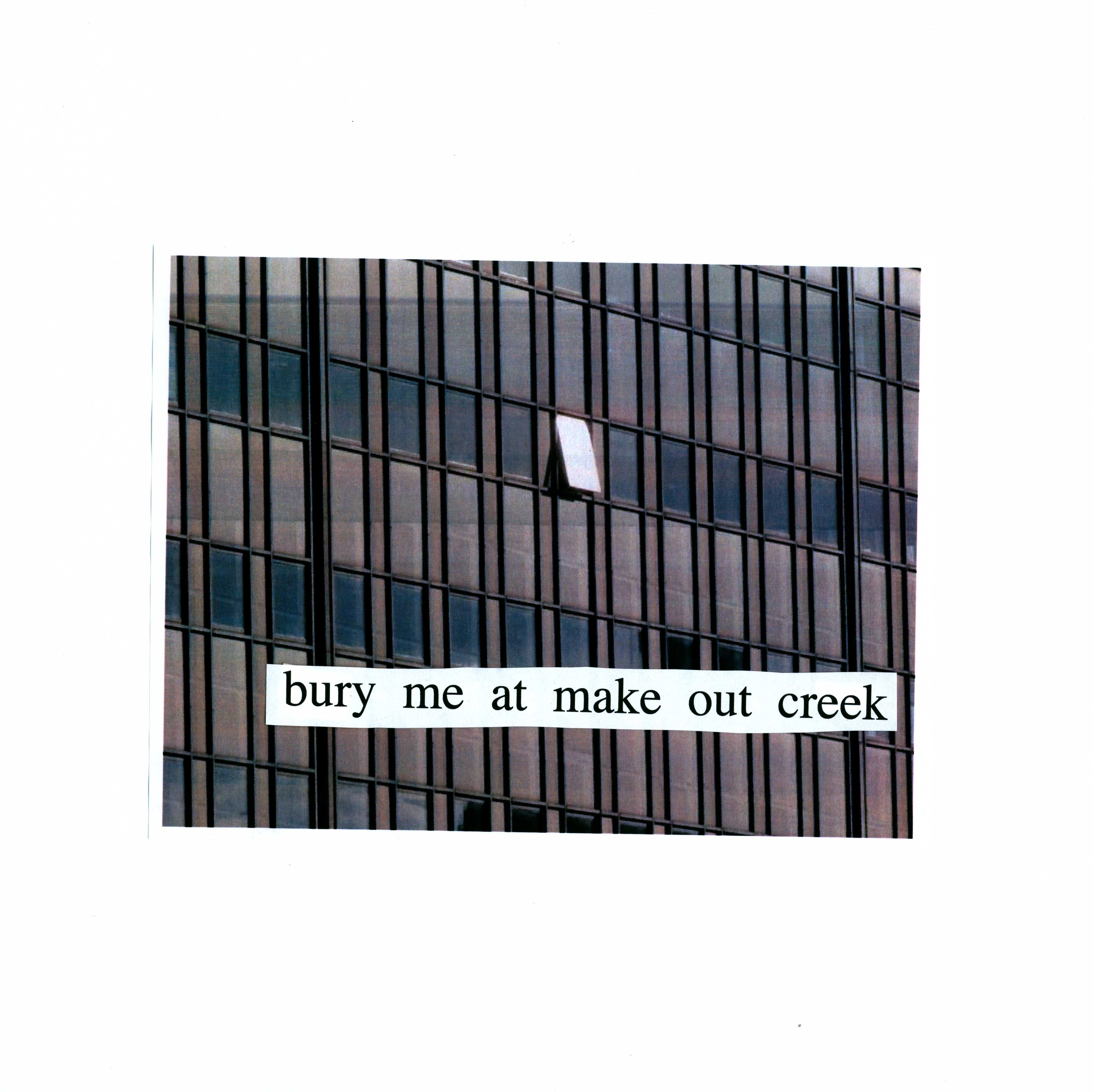
Bury Me at Makeout Creek

Mitski's debut single, "First Love / Late Spring", was first announced on May 14, 2014 by Stereogum and released the following day; an upcoming full-length album on the Double Double Whammy label was additionally teased. She had previously met the label's founders, Dave Benton and Mike Caridi, during her time at Purchase.

Her third studio album, Bury Me at Makeout Creek—named after a reference to The Simpsons (Note: Said by Milhouse Van Houten during the episode "Faith Off".)—was announced on September 16 by Interview alongside the release of her second single, "Townie", with the album set to release on November 11, 2014. Two additional singles were premiered: "I Don't Smoke" by Stereogum on September 29, and "I Will" by NME on October 21. Bury Me at Makeout Creek received a 7.7 rating from Pitchfork and positive acclaim from other journalists. In a retrospective review, Stereogum regarded it as a turning point in her career, describing it as the album which allowed Mitski to "let out her rage."

Mitski briefly signed to Don Giovanni Records on February 18, 2015, who reissued Bury Me at Makeout Creek with four bonus tracks on April 7. She released a cover of Fireproof by One Direction on April 15, noting it as a response to those who "de-legitimize music that has a majority of young girl fans" and against the "elitism of indie rock music." Though originally slated to release her next album on Don Giovanni Records, she signed with Dead Oceans on December 22, 2015, who announced a forthcoming album release.

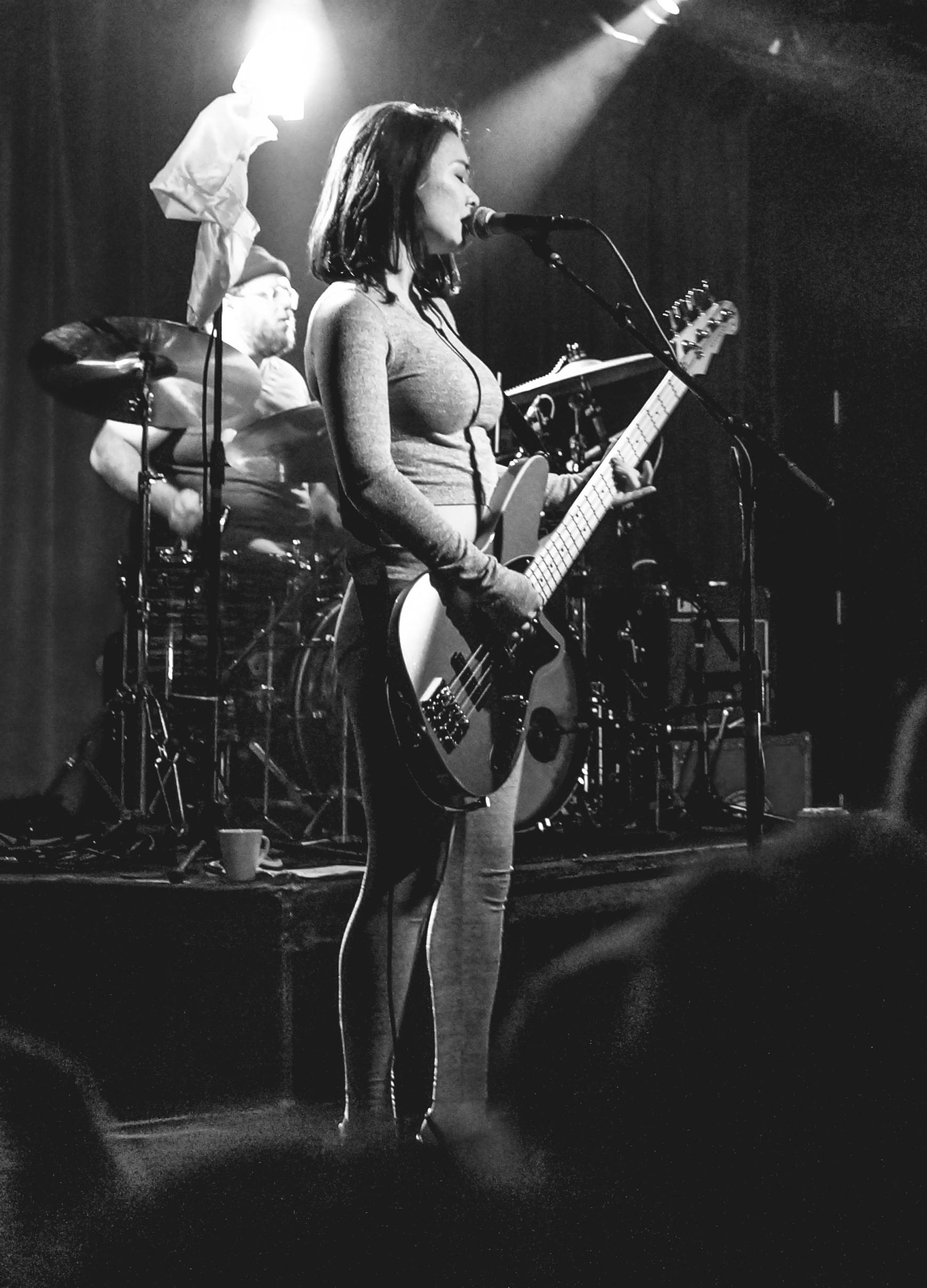
Mitski performing at Paradise Rock Club in November 2016

She revealed her fourth studio album, Puberty 2, on March 1, 2016, alongside releasing its lead single, "Your Best American Girl", slating the album for release on June 17; a tour of North America and Europe was further announced. A music video for the single was released on April 13. The album's second single "Happy" was released on May 3. Mitski and Hyland recorded the album over two weeks at Acme Studios in Westchester County, New York.

Puberty 2 released to critical acclaim, appearing in the top ten of several publications' lists for the best albums of 2016, including The A.V. Club, Paste, Stereogum, and Time. "Your Best American Girl" was further named one of the best songs of the 2010s by several publications, with Rolling Stone ranking it 13th and Pitchfork ranking it 7th. Mitski made her television debut on October 25, performing "Your Best American Girl" on The Late Show with Stephen Colbert.

Her song "Francis Forever" was covered by Olivia Olson as the character Marceline the Vampire Queen in the episode "The Music Hole" from Cartoon Network's show Adventure Time. Its showrunner, Adam Muto, later explained that the song was included after a suggestion by storyboard artist Polly Guo when the staff team lacked a songwriter, additionally stating Mitski was a fan of the show "at the time, at least".

Mitski announced an international tour in support of Puberty 2 on January 9, 2017; the Pixies announced U.S. tour dates with her on February 21, as a supporting act starting in October. She re-uploaded her cover of "Fireproof" by One Direction—which had previously been taken down—on April 7, as part of the Our First 100 Days compilation album by Secretly Group. One track per day was released by Secretly Group to raise money for organizations that supported causes threatened by Donald Trump's proposed policies. Later that year, Mitski covered Frank Sinatra's song "I'm a Fool to Want You" for the 7-Inches For Planned Parenthood compilation album, which released on October 20.

On October 4, Lorde announced that Mitski would open for her during the North American leg of her Melodrama World Tour, which ran from March 1 to April 15, 2018. Mitski penned a review of Weezer's album Pacific Daydream for Talkhouse on October 31. A short film by Emily Yoshida starring Mitski, titled SITTING, was released on November 1.

=== 2018–2022: Be the Cowboy and Laurel Hell ===
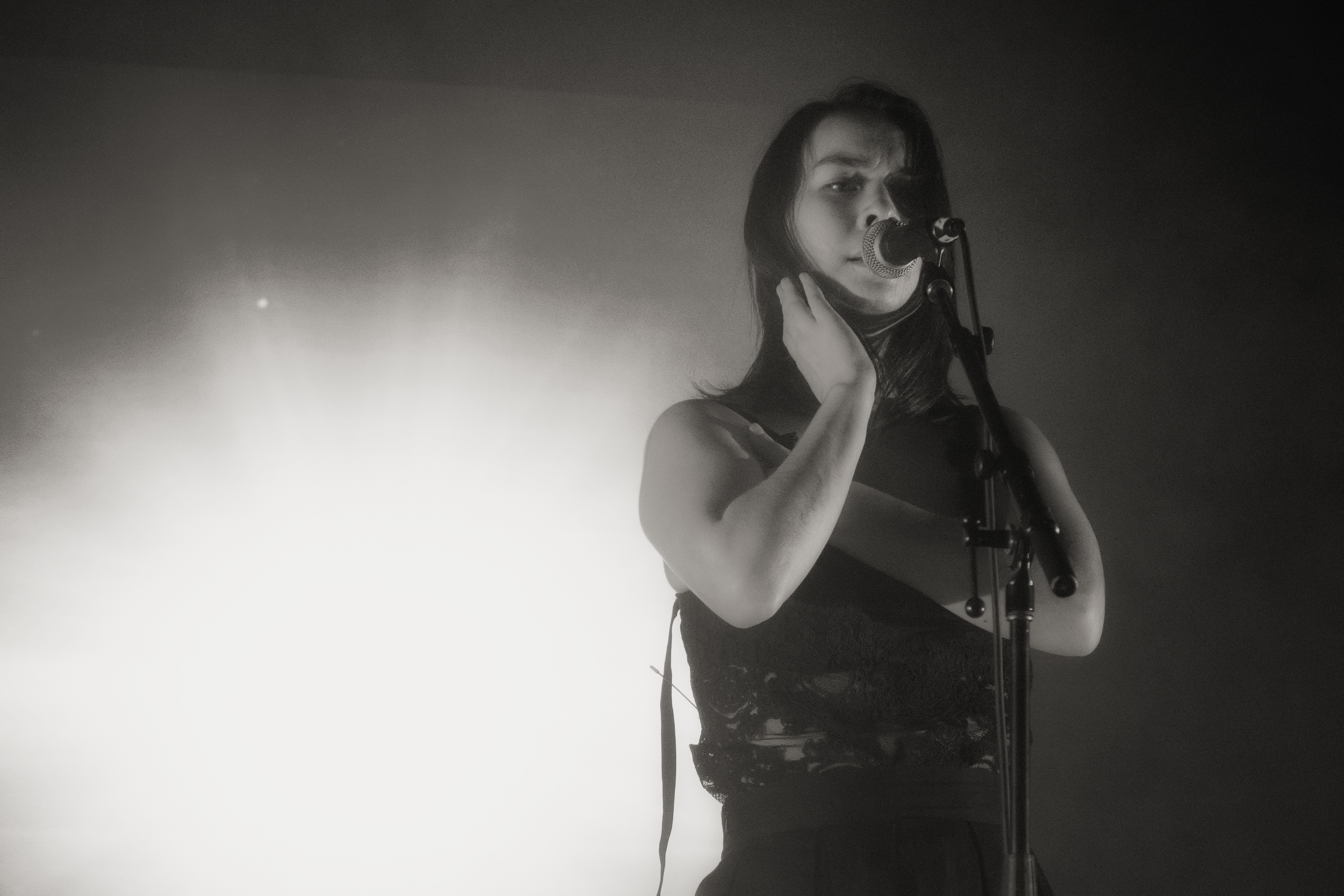
Mitski performing at a concert in Seattle in October 2018

Mitski collaborated with experimental rock band Xiu Xiu on the song "Between the Breaths", releasing it on April 20, 2018 for the soundtrack of the sci-fi rom-com film How to Talk to Girls at Parties, based on the short story of the same name.

On May 14, 2018, Mitski announced her fifth studio album, Be the Cowboy, and released its lead single "Geyser" alongside an accompanying music video, with the album set to release on August 17. She announced the Be the Cowboy Tour on June 3, with shows in North America and Europe, in support of the album. The album's second single and its video, "Nobody", was released on June 26, 2018, and later became an unexpected viral hit on TikTok in 2021, alongside the album's track "Washing Machine Heart".

The third and final single to precede the album, "Two Slow Dancers", was released on August 9 alongside a lyric video. Be the Cowboy was released on August 17 to widespread critical acclaim, and was named the album of the year by Consequence, Flood, The Line of Best Fit, Pitchfork, and Vulture. The album was further nominated for the Grammy Award for Best Recording Package at the 61st Annual Grammy Awards. On December 20, she performed "Nobody" and "Two Slow Dancers" on Jimmy Kimmel Live!.

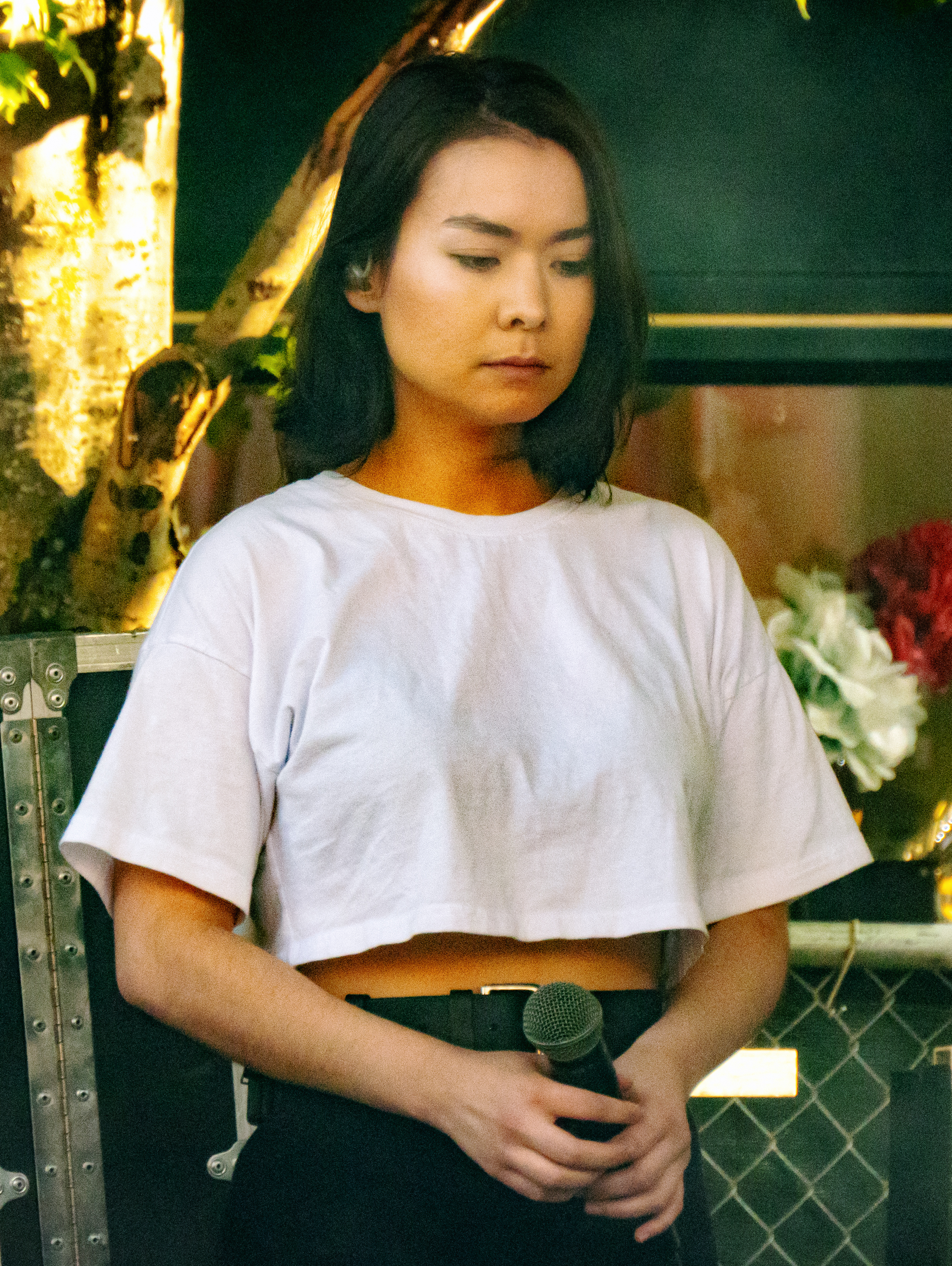
Mitski performing at the Capitol Hill Block Party in July 2019

While working with performance artist Monica Mirabile on tour in 2018, Mitski began incorporating choreography into her live performances inspired by Butoh, a style of avant-garde dance theater developed in post-war Japan. On June 4, 2019, Mitski announced that her performance at Central Park SummerStage on September 7 would be her "last show indefinitely"; she clarified that she would not be quitting music, and added an additional date to the tour for September 8, by popular demand.

Mitski later revealed to Rolling Stone that she had, in fact, intended to quit the music industry and "find another life" following the concert. During her hiatus, she wrote "Working for the Knife" in late 2019 while confronting her decision to quit music.

Her song "Cop Car" was released as part of the soundtrack of the supernatural horror film The Turning, on January 20, 2020. She was featured in the song "Susie Save Your Love" from Allie X's album, Cape God, released on February 21. Contractually obligated by Dead Oceans to release one more album, she began recording what would become her next album alongside Patrick Hyland in early 2020.

On October 29, it was announced that Mitski would provide the soundtrack for the graphic novel This Is Where We Fall, which was set to release in March 2021. She released the song "The Baddy Man" from the soundtrack on March 5, 2021; Z2 Comics released This Is Where We Fall on May 5, bundling the album on vinyl as part of a deluxe edition, and on cassette with the standard hardcover, with no plans to put the soundtrack on streaming services. A second song from the soundtrack, "The End", was released the same day.

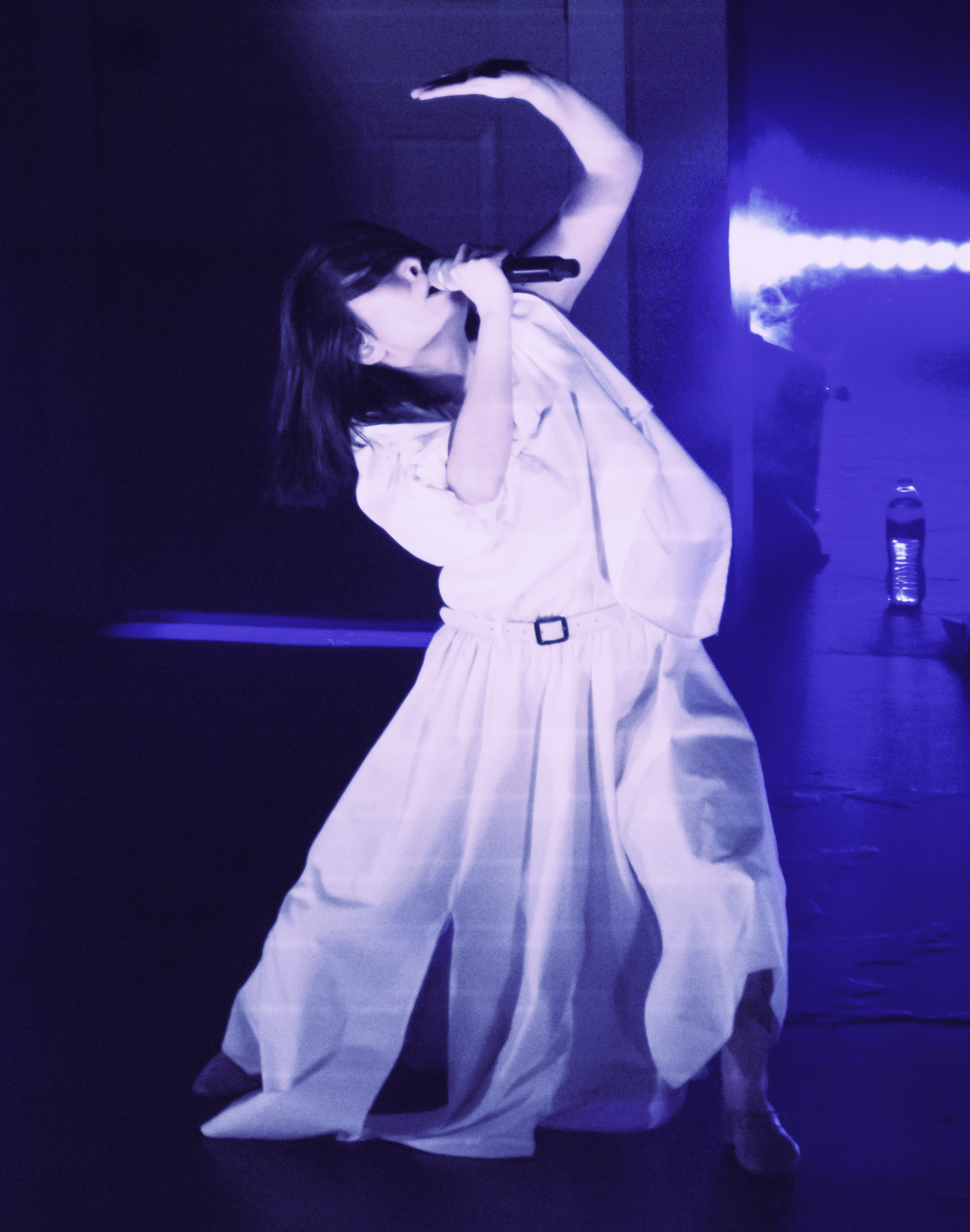
Mitski performing in 2022, incorporating Butoh-inspired choreography

On October 4, 2021, Mitski announced on her social media that she would be releasing a new single, "Working for the Knife", the next day as the lead single to her upcoming sixth studio album. The song would later be named the 7th best song of 2021 by Pitchfork. Soon after the song's release, Mitski announced her 2022 European and North American tour. She followed it up with "The Only Heartbreaker" on November 9, 2021. The same day, Mitski announced her sixth studio album, Laurel Hell, would be released just before her European and North American tour, called Laurel Hell Tour, on February 4, 2022. On December 7, 2021, "Heat Lightning" was released as the third single from the album. On January 12, 2022, "Love Me More" followed as the fourth single from Laurel Hell. In March 2022, "The Only Heartbreaker" peaked at number-one on the Billboard Adult Alternative Airplay chart. On March 4, 2022, Mitski was announced as one of the performers for the Glastonbury Festival, scheduled for June 22–26, 2022.

On April 19, 2022, Mitski's cover of "Glide", from the soundtrack of All About Lily Chou Chou, was released on streaming services. The song was previously available as a bonus track on physical versions of Laurel Hell and was used in the 2022 film After Yang. Mitski appears on the song "This Is a Life" from the soundtrack for the 2022 film Everything Everywhere All at Once. The song also features David Byrne and Son Lux, for which she was nominated for an Academy Award for Best Original Song in 2023.

=== 2023–2025: The Land Is Inhospitable and So Are We ===
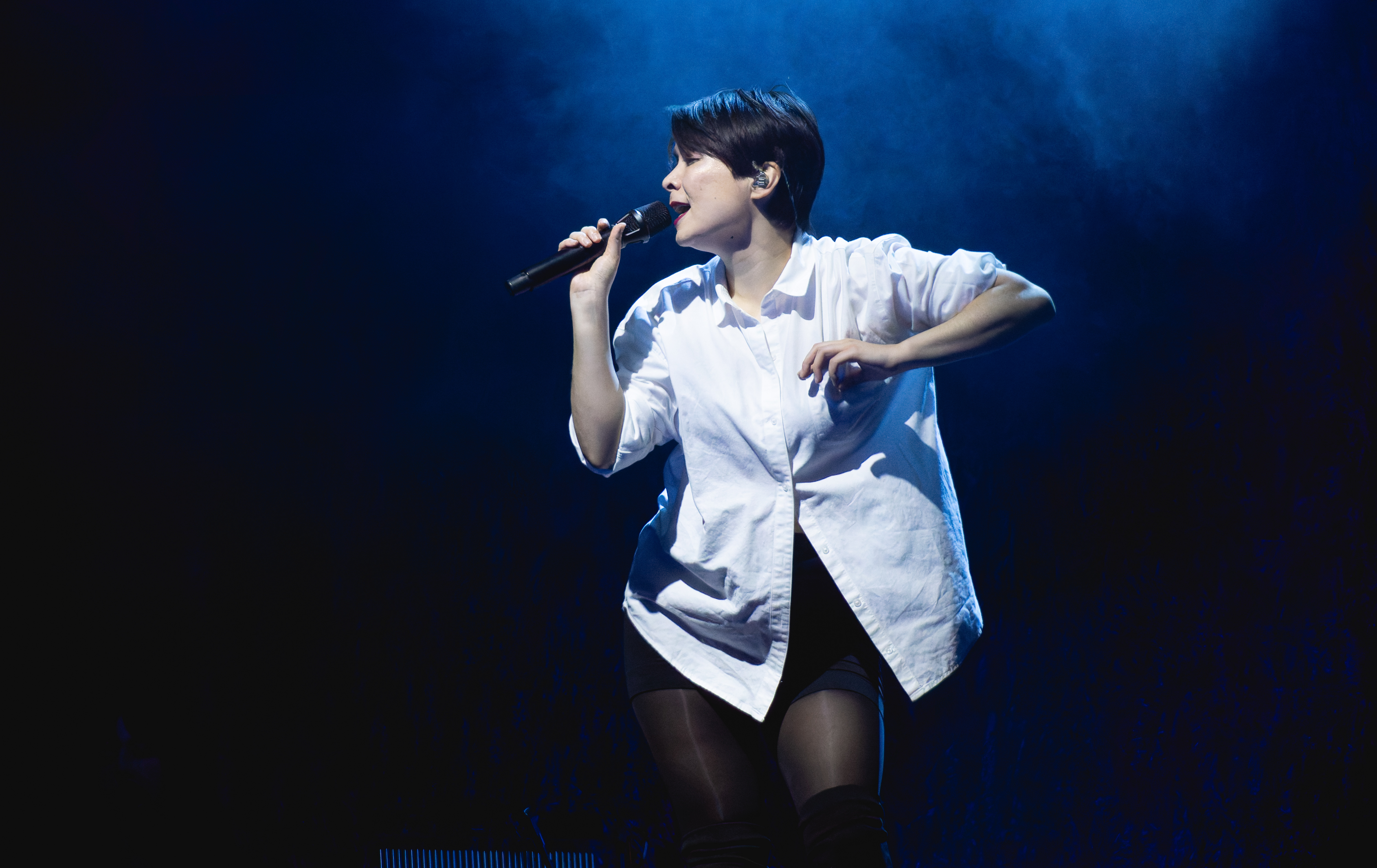
Mitski performing at All Points East festival in 2024

On July 23, 2023, Mitski announced her seventh studio album, The Land Is Inhospitable and So Are We, with information on the first single, "Bug Like an Angel", which was released on July 26. The news was revealed via a voice memo she recorded at Bomb Shelter Studio in Nashville, Tennessee, where the album was recorded. The voice memo was sent out to all subscribers of her newsletter. The following two singles from the album, "Heaven" and "Star", were released on August 23, with the former premiering on BBC Radio 1.

In order to promote the new album in August of 2023, Mitski announced a series of cinema experiences. These experiences involved a pre-release listening party for The Land Is Inhospitable and So Are We alongside a screening of a film chosen personally by Mitski: these films included Terrence Malick’s Days of Heaven, Donna Deitch’s Desert Hearts, Gus Van Sant’s Drugstore Cowboy and Federico Fellini’s La Strada.

Mitski also announced six concert dates set to take place in the United Kingdom, Germany, the Netherlands, and France. Mitski described these dates as "not a full-blown tour", but intimate and small enough to preview the album without elaborate stage production. She later added nineteen tour dates set to take place in the US in 2024.

In November 2023, it was announced that Mitski was attached to write lyrics and music for a Broadway adaptation of the 1983 novel The Queen's Gambit.

In March 2024, Mitski participated in the Spotify Singles series. Accompanied by Patrick Hyland on acoustic guitar and Jeni Magaña on double bass, she covered "Coyote, My Little Brother", originally by Pete Seeger, and recorded a version of "Buffalo Replaced."

Mitski released a concert film directed by Grant James, Mitski: The Land, shown in 630 cinemas across 30 countries in October 2025. It was filmed at the Fox Theatre in Atlanta, Georgia, over three nights of Mitski's 2024 tour for her album The Land Is Inhospitable and So Are We. She released a live album, The Land: The Live Album, featuring recordings from the film on October 16, 2025. Mitski's cover of "Let My Love Open the Door" was featured on the soundtrack for the 2025 film A Big Bold Beautiful Journey.

=== 2026–present: Nothing's About to Happen to Me ===
Mitski wiped her Instagram account on January 12, 2026, posting cryptic teaser videos on her page over the course of the next three days. On January 16, she officially announced her eighth studio album, Nothing's About to Happen to Me, alongside releasing its lead single "Where's My Phone?", slating the album to release on February 27. The album's second single, "I'll Change for You", was released on February 3, alongside the announcement of an international tour across North America, Europe and Asia. Two early listening events were further scheduled for February 21 and 26. Nothing's About to Happen to Me released to critical acclaim, receiving five-star ratings from NME and The Guardian. She performed "If I Leave" on Jimmy Kimmel Live! on April 8. The album has been nominated for Best Recording Package at the 69th Annual Grammy Awards, marking her second album to be nominated for this award and Mitski's first credited Grammy nomination.

== Musical style ==
Critics have primarily described Mitski's music as indie rock, indie pop, and art pop. Her first two albums were orchestrally driven while Bury Me At Makeout Creek and Puberty 2 heavily featured guitar centered punk rock music. Be the Cowboy and Laurel Hell were pop albums that utilized electronic instruments. E. Alex Jung described her as "an artist whose music feels like being ushered into a private opera house of melodrama" with lyrics full of "roiling fury, destructive impulses, humiliation, longing, heartache, and hunger". Angie Martoccio of Rolling Stone described her earlier albums as a "wry running commentary on twentysomething angst, raw desire, and often unrequited love". Lucy Dacus, a singer-songwriter who has at times opened for Mitski, described her music as "really visceral… She's connected to a part in herself that wants to scream. Maybe you don't live in a space where you can scream, or maybe you don't have the words for what has happened to you. Mitski provides a space for that."

Similarly, Mitski has described her music as a place where people "can put all of their feelings, their ugliness, that doesn't have a place in their own lives."

== Public image ==
In a 2016 interview with The New York Times, Mitski described the tension of being a private person and her discomfort with the attention that comes with being in the public eye, therefore preferring to keep her personal life private. Since her breakthrough in 2014, she has often been described as private by the press.

As an Asian-American woman, Mitski has felt pressure to represent her community.

Mitski is not active on social media, and the accounts under her name are run by a manager. She left social media in 2019 because she felt it was unhealthy for her self-image. However, she has gained massive popularity on social media. As of February 2022, her music has been featured in over 2.5 million videos on TikTok. In 2021, former President of the United States Barack Obama included "The Only Heartbreaker" in his yearly list of top songs.

=== Views on the music industry ===
On September 9, 2019, at a show in Central Park, Mitski announced it would be her last show indefinitely, causing her fanbase to express their distress on social media. The reaction online to this announcement prompted her to tell her fans she was not going to quit music; however, at the time, she intended to quit music for good. She has stated her main reason for quitting was that she had a difficult time grappling with newfound indie stardom when her 2018 album Be the Cowboy hit the mainstream.

Mitski said the music industry felt like a "super-saturated version of consumerism", and that in the industry "you have to be a product that's being bought and sold and consumed". She regrets using her actual name to release music because it no longer felt like it belonged to her, and she felt like "a foreigner" to herself. She feared that by continuing to make music, eventually she would begin to create music she did not care about. In 2019, Mitski wrote a new single, "Working for the Knife", where she describes her "reluctance to return to the stage". In February 2022, Mitski released a new record Laurel Hell, returning to the music industry.

=== Social media and her fanbase ===
In 2016, she told Brooklyn Magazine that she had quit Tumblr, explaining, "I started getting messages where teenagers would threaten to hurt themselves if I didn't respond, and I realized that I didn’t want to be that accessible." Later, in June 2019, she deleted her social media accounts following the announcement of her "last show indefinitely" that September. On August 13, 2019, she reactivated her social media accounts to respond to false child sexual abuse allegations (Note: Though coverage stopped following Mitski's statement, The Daily Dot later published an article dismissing the allegations as a hoax based on contradictory evidence, citing statements from backing guitarist Greg Rutkin, journalist Peyton Thomas, and a Twitter user claiming to be the accuser's brother.) made against her by a Tumblr user, alleging Mitski's sexual abuse and involvement in a sex trafficking ring; Mitski denied the allegations, making a public statement.

The allegations made on Tumblr of child sex trafficking and abuse against me are completely false in every respect. I don't know the accuser, and I don't know how or why they have come to associate me with their trauma. I have not ever been part of sex trafficking or child abuse in any form. [...]

— Mitski (@mitskileaks), August 13, 2019

Mitski has stated in interviews that she has an uneasy relationship with her fans because she finds their relationship to her and her music overwhelming. She found the "worshipful commentary" about herself online damaging to her self-image. Her fanbase has been described as "extremely online", "cultish", and as rivaling "Taylor Swift and BTS in intensity, if not size".

In a 2022 interview, she described the audience at one of her shows as "unrelenting". Recalling an instance where she had to proceed through an audience unescorted to her dressing room, she said: "Everyone needed a piece of me […] I was so overwhelmed by hands grabbing at me that I was crying." In February 2022, Mitski tweeted out a statement asking fans to stop using their phones to record her shows, as "…it makes me feel as though we are not here together… When I'm on stage and look to you but you are gazing into a screen, it makes me feel as though those of us on stage are being taken from and consumed as content, instead of getting to share a moment with you."

== Personal life ==
Mitski has declined to discuss her relationships, family or personal connections in interviews, stating that those close to her had not consented to public attention. Having previously lived in Brooklyn and Philadelphia, Pennsylvania, she moved to Nashville, Tennessee around 2019, in part to not live in "competitive, expensive cities" like New York City and Los Angeles, California. In an interview with The New Yorker in 2019, she was described as "shuffling between Airbnbs, sublets, and hotels" due to the cost of rent in New York City, though stored her things, and occasionally lived at, her parents' home in suburban Pennsylvania.

== Backing band ==
Current members

- Patrick Hyland – guitar, production, musical direction (2014–present)
- Callan Dwan – guitar, keyboards (2015–present)
- Jeni Magaña – bass guitar (2018–present)
- Bruno Esrubilsky – drums (2018–present)
- Ty Bailie – piano, organ (2023–present)
- Fats Kaplin – pedal steel, fiddle, accordion (2023–present)
- Brijean Murphy – percussion (2023–present)

Former members

- Mike Caridi – guitar (2014–2015)
- Kayla Cashetta – drums (2014)
- Kat Casale – drums (2015)
- Maggie Pakutka – guitar (2015)
- Casey Weissbuch – drums (2015–2018)

== Discography ==
- Lush (2012)
- Retired from Sad, New Career in Business (2013)
- Bury Me at Makeout Creek (2014)
- Puberty 2 (2016)
- Be the Cowboy (2018)
- Laurel Hell (2022)
- The Land Is Inhospitable and So Are We (2023)
- Nothing's About to Happen to Me (2026)

== Tours ==
- Puberty 2 Tour (2016)
- Be the Cowboy Tour (2018)
- Laurel Hell Tour (2022)
- The Land Is Inhospitable and So Are We Tour (2024)
- Nothing's About to Happen to Me Live 2026 (2026)

== Awards and nominations ==
| Award | Year | Category | Nominated work | Result | Ref. |
|---|---|---|---|---|---|
| Academy Awards | 2023 | Best Original Song | "This Is a Life" (with Son Lux and David Byrne) | Nominated | |
| AIM Independent Music Awards | 2022 | International Breakthrough | Mitski | Nominated | |
| AIM Independent Music Awards | 2022 | Best Live Performer | Mitski | Won | |
| AIM Independent Music Awards | 2022 | Best Creative Campaign | Laurel Hell | Nominated | |
| AIM Independent Music Awards | 2026 | Best Independent Album | Nothing's About to Happen to Me | Nominated | |
| AIM Independent Music Awards | 2026 | Best Release Campaign | Nothing's About to Happen to Me | Nominated | |
| AIM Independent Music Awards | 2026 | Best Independent Video | "Where's My Phone" | Nominated | |
| Berlin Music Video Awards | 2026 | Best Director | "Where's My Phone" | Won | |
| Grammy Awards | 2027 | Best Recording Package | Nothing's About to Happen to Me | Pending | |
| Libera Awards | 2017 | Video of the Year | "Your Best American Girl" | Nominated | |
| Libera Awards | 2019 | Album of the Year | Be the Cowboy | Nominated | |
| Libera Awards | 2019 | Best Rock Album | Be the Cowboy | Nominated | |
| Libera Awards | 2019 | Creative Packaging | Be the Cowboy | Nominated | |
| Libera Awards | 2019 | Best Live Act | Mitski | Nominated | |
| Libera Awards | 2019 | Music Video of the Year | "Nobody" | Won | |
| Libera Awards | 2023 | Best Alternative Rock Record | Laurel Hell | Nominated | |
| Libera Awards | 2023 | Creative Packaging | Laurel Hell | Nominated | |
| Libera Awards | 2024 | Record of the Year | The Land Is Inhospitable and So Are We | Won | |
| Libera Awards | 2024 | Best Alternative Rock Record | The Land Is Inhospitable and So Are We | Nominated | |
| Libera Awards | 2024 | Marketing Genius | The Land Is Inhospitable and So Are We | Nominated | |
| Libera Awards | 2024 | Best Short-Form Video | The Land Is Inhospitable and So Are We | Nominated | |
| UK Music Video Awards | 2024 | Best Alternative Video – International | "My Love Mine All Mine" | Nominated | |
| UK Music Video Awards | 2026 | Best Alternative Video – International | "Where's My Phone?" | Pending | |
