= My Love Mine All Mine =

Single by Mitski

from the album The Land Is Inhospitable and So Are We
- Released: September 15, 2023
- Genre: Slowcore; Gothic country; lounge
- Length: 2:17
- Label: Dead Oceans
- Songwriter: Mitski Miyawaki
- Producer: Patrick Hyland

Mitski singles chronology
"Star" / "Heaven" (2023)	"My Love Mine All Mine" (2023)	"Where's My Phone?" (2026)

Music video
- "My Love Mine All Mine" on YouTube

"My Love Mine All Mine" is a song by American singer-songwriter Mitski. It was released as the third single from her seventh studio album The Land Is Inhospitable and So Are We on September 15, 2023. The song features country-influenced piano and pedal steel guitar, while its lyrics depict Mitski requesting the Moon to take her love when she dies and shine it back down to Earth.

After finding success on TikTok, "My Love Mine All Mine" became Mitski's commercial breakthrough and her first entry on the Billboard Hot 100, where it peaked at number 26, and also on the UK Singles Chart, where it reached number eight. It received widespread praise from critics, several of whom identified it as the best song on The Land Is Inhospitable and So Are We and as one of the best of 2023. The music video for the song was released on the same day as the album and directed by A.G. Rojas; it shows Mitski building a tower of chairs atop an egg before climbing it.

== Release and composition ==
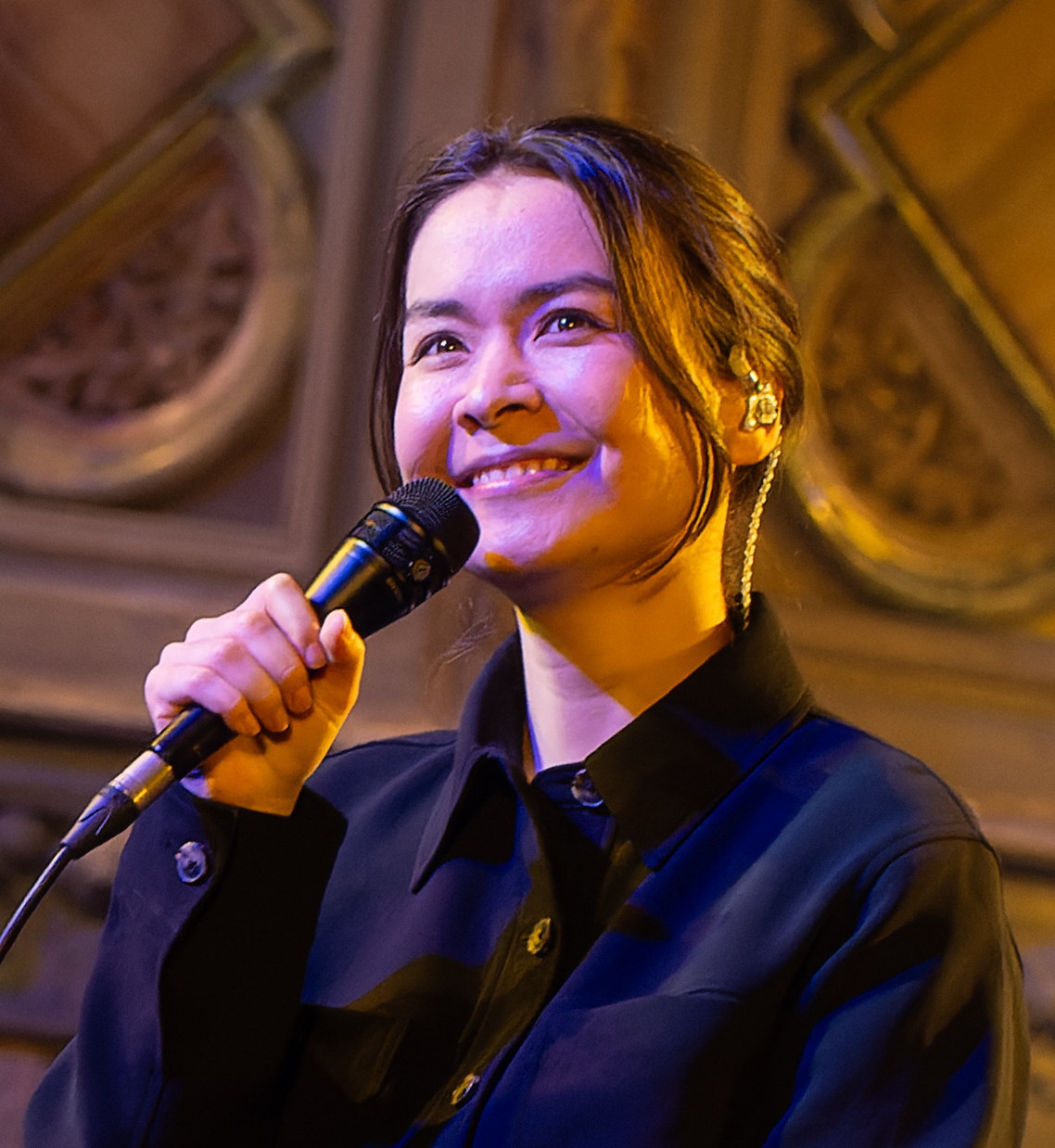
Mitski performing in 2023

"My Love Mine All Mine" originally appeared as the seventh song on Mitski's seventh studio album, The Land Is Inhospitable and So Are We, which was released through Dead Oceans on September 15, 2023. Mitski had previously been widely known among music critics and in indie music circles before her 2018 single "Nobody" went viral on TikTok in 2020 and she subsequently found mainstream commercial success with the release of her sixth studio album, Laurel Hell (2022). Mitski did very little promotion for The Land Is Inhospitable and So Are We or "My Love Mine All Mine" outside of a video explaining the latter's lyrics for Genius. Upon the release of the album, "My Love Mine All Mine" found success on TikTok, where it soundtracked more than 300 thousand videos by October 2023, wherein users discussed their experiences with love. By July 2024, it had been used in more than 2.2 million videos on the platform.

"My Love Mine All Mine" is written in the key of A major, with a concert pitch of A4=434hz. The song has a tempo of 57 beats per minute. Mitski's vocals range from E3 to F♯4 and are backed by "subdued" piano, pedal steel guitar, and a choir. Its lyrics see Mitski saying her love is the only thing that she owns ("Nothing in the world belongs to me / But my love, mine all mine all mine") and asking the Moon to hold onto it after she dies to immortalize it so that it can be shined back down to Earth. Kaelen Bell of Exclaim! called the song "dusky lounge", Marcy Donelson of AllMusic wrote that it was "seductively languid" with "orchestrated country stylings", and Brenna Ehrlich of Rolling Stone wrote that it was a "goth-country epic"; Paste's Matt Mitchell also identified it as gothic country. Christopher J. Lee of PopMatters called it a "slow dance number" that depicts love as "a social condition experienced as part of the wider world", contrasting it with her previous albums' idea of it as "an insular situation between two people". For Far Out, Elle Palmer also contrasted it from her earlier work about love and wrote that it was "a far calmer look at love than her discography has previously allowed for". Under the Radar's Marc Abbott likened the song's sound to Lana Del Rey.

== Music video ==
The music video for "My Love Mine All Mine" was directed by A.G. Rojas and released simultaneously with The Land is Inhospitable and So Are We. It features Mitski stacking dining chairs on top of each other to create a tower. Before climbing to the top of the tower, she places an egg beneath one of the legs of the bottom chair. Upon reaching the top of the tower, she sits on the chair sculpture, puts her hand over her eye to mimic looking through a spyglass and sees a sunset over an ocean. Danielle Chelosky of Uproxx described the video as "eerie" and wrote that it "conveys the subtle poignance of the sprawling song".

== Commercial performance ==
"My Love Mine All Mine" was described as Mitski's commercial breakthrough by George Griffiths of Official Charts. "My Love Mine All Mine" became Mitski's first song to chart on the Billboard Hot 100, where it debuted at number 76 on the chart dated September 30, 2023. It became the second song released through Dead Oceans to appear on the chart, following Phoebe Bridgers's and Maggie Rogers's 2020 cover of the Goo Goo Dolls song "Iris". "My Love Mine All Mine" soon rose to the top 40 of the chart in late October, eventually peaking at number 26. The song also became her first entry on the UK Singles Chart, where it debuted at number 63 upon the release of The Land Is Inhospitable and So Are We and reached number eight in October 2023. The song found further success on streaming services in Mexico and Southeast Asia. The song surpassed one billion streams on Spotify in July 2024. As of July 2026, the song has two billion streams on the service.

== Critical reception ==
"My Love Mine All Mine" was widely praised by music critics, several of whom deemed it a standout track of The Land Is Inhospitable and So Are We, including Christopher J. Lee of PopMatters, who called Mitski's vocals on the song "gorgeous". Crack's Lauren O'Neill called it "the album's sweet, tender highlight", while Mia Hughes of NME wrote that it was "the album's most stunning track" and "a gorgeous slow-dance". For The Skinny, Rho Chung called "My Love Mine All Mine" the "fulcrum" of The Land is Inhospitable and So Are We, describing the song's lyrics as "always genuine, never cloying" and delivered with a "gentle, honest cadence". Alex Hooper of American Songwriter similarly wrote that the song "gets down to the core of the record" and praised it as a "stunner". Kaelen Bell of Exclaim! called the song "both heartbreaking and hopeful, the kind of careful balance that Mitski has fine tuned in the decade since her debut". For Slant Magazine, Eric Mason deemed "My Love Mine All Mine" as one of the album's "emotional peaks", which were "so moving that the listener may also be convinced that love is a light in a dark world". For Uproxx, Danielle Chelosky wrote that the song was "as haunting as it is beautiful", while Lindsay Zoladz of The New York Times wrote that the song was a "warm, lushly atmospheric ballad" that displayed the "luminous warmth" and "easy confidence" of The Land is Inhospitable and So Are We.

"My Love Mine All Mine" was ranked among the best songs of 2023 by many publications, including Billboard, the New York Times, NME, Pitchfork, and Rolling Stone. (Note: Attributed to multiple references:) Former U.S. president Barack Obama listed it as one of his favorite songs of 2023.

== Covers and live performances ==
In 2023, Mitski performed the song during her international tour of intimate venues for The Land Is Inhospitable and So Are We, where it was backed only by an acoustic guitar and a double bass. She gave an acoustic performance of "My Love Mine All Mine" for SiriusXMU in October 2023 with the same instrumental accompaniment.

Clairo posted a cover of "My Love Mine All Mine" to her Instagram account days after the song's release. The song was also covered by Trey Anastasio of Phish at the 2024 Ally Coalition Talent Show; Anastasio praised the song as the "most beautiful romantic song of the decade". Other artists who have performed the song include Kelly Clarkson and Mark Mulcahy.

== Charts ==
=== Weekly charts ===
Weekly chart performance for "My Love Mine All Mine"
Chart (2023–2024)	Peak position
Australia (ARIA)	19
Austria (Ö3 Austria Top 40)	69
Canada Hot 100 (Billboard)	17
Czech Republic Singles Digital (ČNS IFPI)	68
France (SNEP)	86
Global 200 (Billboard)	12
Greece International (IFPI)	49
Iceland (Tónlistinn)	32
India International (IMI)	15
Indonesia (Billboard)	2
Ireland (IRMA)	8
Israel (Mako Hitlist)	94
Latvia Streaming (LaIPA)	11
Lithuania (AGATA)	8
Malaysia (Billboard)	2
Middle East and North Africa (IFPI)	9
Netherlands (Single Top 100)	59
Netherlands (Tipparade)	6
New Zealand (Recorded Music NZ)	5
Poland (Polish Streaming Top 100)	56
Portugal (AFP)	43
Philippines (Billboard)	4
Philippines (Philippines Hot 100)	83
Saudi Arabia (IFPI)	20
Singapore (RIAS)	5
Slovakia Singles Digital (ČNS IFPI)	75
Sweden (Sverigetopplistan)	53
Switzerland (Schweizer Hitparade)	33
United Arab Emirates (IFPI)	6
UK Singles (Official Charts)	8
UK Indie (Official Charts)	1
US Billboard Hot 100	26
US Hot Rock & Alternative Songs (Billboard)	4
US Pop Airplay (Billboard)	32
US Rock & Alternative Airplay (Billboard)	32
Vietnam (Vietnam Hot 100)	19

=== Year-end charts ===
2023 year-end chart performance for "My Love Mine All Mine"
Chart (2023)	Position
US Hot Rock & Alternative Songs (Billboard)	92

2024 year-end chart performance for "My Love Mine All Mine"
Chart (2024)	Position
Canadian Hot 100 (Billboard)	51
Global 200 (Billboard)	30
Philippines (Philippines Hot 100)	37
US Hot Rock & Alternative Songs (Billboard)	10

== Certifications ==
Certifications for "My Love Mine All Mine"
Region	Certification	Certified units/sales
Denmark (IFPI Danmark)	Gold	45,000^{‡}
France (SNEP)	Platinum	200,000^{‡}
Italy (FIMI)	Gold	50,000^{‡}
New Zealand (RMNZ)	3× Platinum	90,000^{‡}
Norway (IFPI Norway)	Gold	30,000^{‡}
Spain (Promusicae)	Gold	30,000^{‡}
United Kingdom (BPI)	Platinum	600,000^{‡}
United States (RIAA)	4× Platinum	4,000,000^{‡}
Streaming
Greece (IFPI Greece)	Gold	1,000,000^{†}
Sweden (GLF)	Gold	6,000,000^{†}
^{‡} Sales+streaming figures based on certification alone.^{†} Streaming-only figures based on certification alone.

== Release history ==
Release dates and formats for "My Love Mine All Mine"
Region	Date	Format(s)	Label	Ref.
Various	September 15, 2023	Digital download; streaming	Dead Oceans	
Italy	October 3, 2023	Airplay	Dead Oceans	
