= The Land Is Inhospitable and So Are We =

Studio album by Mitski
- Released: September 15, 2023
- Studios: Bomb Shelter, Nashville; Sunset Sound, Los Angeles
- Genres: Americana; country; folk; orchestral pop
- Length: 32:21
- Label: Dead Oceans
- Producer: Patrick Hyland

Mitski chronology
Laurel Hell (2022)	The Land Is Inhospitable and So Are We (2023)	Nothing's About to Happen to Me (2026)

Singles from The Land Is Inhospitable and So Are We
- 1. "Bug Like an Angel" Released: July 26, 2023; 2. "Star" Released: August 23, 2023; 3. "Heaven" Released: August 23, 2023; 4. "My Love Mine All Mine" Released: October 3, 2023

The Land Is Inhospitable and So Are We is the seventh studio album by American singer-songwriter Mitski, released on September 15, 2023, through Dead Oceans. Produced by Patrick Hyland, it was recorded at the Bomb Shelter studio in Nashville and Sunset Sound in Los Angeles. The album was promoted by the release of the singles "Bug Like an Angel", "Star", "Heaven" and "My Love Mine All Mine" through July to October 2023, the last being Mitski's most successful song to date. An Americana, country, folk, and orchestral pop record, The Land Is Inhospitable was received with universal praise by critics, who focused on the emotional rawness of Mitski's lyrics as well as the stripped-down nature of the music.

== Background and recording ==
Mitski recorded The Land Is Inhospitable and So Are We with producer Patrick Hyland at Bomb Shelter in Nashville and Sunset Sound in Los Angeles. A 17-person choir arranged by Mitski, as well as an orchestra, conducted and arranged by Drew Erickson, features on several tracks.

Mitski has called The Land Is Inhospitable her "most American album", with "the theme of love" being central to its lyrics. The album was also influenced by spaghetti Western soundtracks as well as the works of Arthur Russell, Igor Stravinsky, Scott Walker, Caetano Veloso, Faron Young and Terry Riley.

== Promotion ==
Mitski announced the release of the new album and its title via her newsletter on July 23, 2023. Three days later, the album's lead single "Bug Like an Angel" was released, accompanied by a music video directed by Noel Paul. A month later the track "Heaven" debuted on BBC Radio 1's "Future Sounds" on August 23, accompanied with an interview with Mitski and presenter Jack Saunders. It was released alongside the song "Star" as a double-sided single on that same day. The third single, "My Love Mine All Mine", and its accompanying music video were released in tandem with the album on September 15, 2023. The song became Mitski's first to chart on the US Billboard Hot 100, peaking at number 26. It also entered the top 10 of the UK Singles Chart.

Mitski announced four acoustic concerts in North America for September 2023, as well as six concert dates set to take place in the UK, Germany, the Netherlands and France in October 2023.

The Land Is Inhospitable was previewed early in a series of "double feature" listening events at theatres in the United States, London and Australia on September 7, 2023. An additional event was held at Tokyo's Cosmo Planetarium Shibuya a week later. The events were accompanied by the screening of a film personally selected by Mitski: either Days of Heaven (1978), Desert Hearts (1985), Drugstore Cowboy (1989) or La Strada (1954).

== Critical reception ==
Professional ratings
Aggregate scores
Source	Rating
AnyDecentMusic?	8.6/10
Metacritic	90/100
Review scores
Source	Rating
AllMusic	4/5 stars
Clash	8/10
DIY	4.5/5 stars
Exclaim!	9/10
The Guardian	5/5 stars
Mojo	4/5 stars
NME	4/5 stars
Pitchfork	8.1/10
The Skinny	5/5 stars
Slant Magazine	4.5/5 stars

The Land Is Inhospitable and So Are We received a score of 90 out of 100 on review aggregator Metacritic based on 24 critics' reviews, indicating "universal acclaim". Mojo felt that "Mitski has long stared at happiness and wondered what comes next; here, she spies it, smiles and then shrugs, the smart band beneath glowing like some warmth hearth on a cold Los Angeles Night". Exclaim!'s Kaelen Bell described it as "a phoenix-from-the-ashes return, a ghost story, a country record. It's Mitski's first album recorded with a full band. It's also her loneliest."

Slant Magazine's Eric Mason found that Mitski has "refined her skill of dropping heartbreaking, poetic aphorisms between her tightly packed metaphors", remarking that her "ability to pack so many gut-punches and inspired ideas into half an hour remains uncannily impactful". Rho Chung of The Skinny called the album "a sweeping musical epic spanning essential facets of human experience; a meditation on self-witnessing, of owning one's estrangement" as well as "far-reaching but never vague – true to form, Mitski's writing remains supremely evocative, mesmerising".

Cat Zhang of Pitchfork stated that the album is "warmer, quieter, and more organic-sounding" and that "these are among some of the most surreal, existential, and fascinating songs of Mitski's career". Zhang additionally remarked that "for the first time in a while, she sounds like she has space to breathe". Alexis Petridis of The Guardian named it his album of the week and called it "classic songwriter territory" and "filled with melodies; she can write straightforward love songs, filled with beautiful imagery [...] but what tends to get lost amid the earnest discussion of her lyrics is how darkly funny they are".

Reviewing the album for DIY, James Hickey found the album to be "an achievement in that in such a diverse catalogue it manages to hatch its own identity without straying from her singular voice". Hickey found that songs "often seem to have bare-bones arrangements" but overall the album "becomes increasingly intense". Marcy Donelson of AllMusic observed that The Land Is Inhospitable and So Are We is "more reserved, acoustic-leaning" as well as "a quasi-country album" with similar lyrical imagery.

Clash's Amelie Grace called it "Mitski at her most emotionally raw" and stated that the album "goes through a constant battle of peace and dread, [...] staunchly refusing to settle in any one place". Mia Hughes of NME wrote that the album "does away with the glossy sheen and favours hushed intimacy" as Mitski "return[s] to a more organic and analogue sound" with "sonics [that] feel worn-in and earthly".

The Land Is Inhospitable and So Are We on year-end lists
Publication	Accolade	Rank	Ref.
British GQ	The Best Albums of 2023	—N/a	
Exclaim!	Exclaim's 50 Best Albums of 2023	2	
Paste	The 50 Best Albums of 2023	8	
Pitchfork	The 50 Best Albums of 2023	23	
Rolling Stone	The 100 Best Albums of 2023	7	
Time Out	The 30 Best Albums of 2023	22	

== Track listing ==
All tracks are written by Mitski Miyawaki.

The Land Is Inhospitable and So Are We track listing
No.	Title	Length
1.	"Bug Like an Angel"	3:32
2.	"Buffalo Replaced"	2:40
3.	"Heaven"	3:44
4.	"I Don't Like My Mind"	2:25
5.	"The Deal"	3:52
6.	"When Memories Snow"	1:44
7.	"My Love Mine All Mine"	2:17
8.	"The Frost"	2:48
9.	"Star"	2:59
10.	"I'm Your Man"	3:29
11.	"I Love Me After You"	2:48
Total length:		32:21

== Personnel ==
Musicians

- Mitski Miyawaki – vocals, choir, keyboards
- Patrick Hyland – bass, drums, guitar, keyboards
- Drew Erickson – choir, orchestra (all tracks); conductor (3, 6, 9), piano (3)
- Adam Faruqi – choir (1, 6, 7, 10)
- Andrea Zomorodian – choir (1, 6, 7, 10)
- Ann Sheridan – choir (1, 6, 7, 10)
- Ben Lin – choir (1, 6, 7, 10)
- Caitlin Rose – choir (1, 6, 7, 10)
- Callan Dwan – choir (1, 6, 7, 10)
- Charles McDonald – choir (1, 6, 7, 10)
- Courtney Taylor – choir (1, 6, 7, 10)
- Elyse Willis – choir (1, 6, 7, 10)
- Erin Rae – choir (1, 6, 7, 10)
- Fletcher Sheridan – choir (1, 6, 7, 10), conductor (2–11)
- Jessica Freedman – choir (1, 6, 7, 10)
- Michael Lichtenauer – choir (1, 6, 7, 10)
- Peter Mercer – choir (1, 6, 7, 10)
- Tristen Gaspadarek – choir (1, 6, 7, 10)
- Valerie Tambaoan – choir (1, 6, 7, 10)
- Will Goldman – choir (1, 6, 7, 10)
- Dominic Davis – bass (3–8)
- Ross McReynolds – drums (3, 4, 6, 8–10)
- Christine Kim – cello (3, 6, 9)
- Danielle Ondarza – French horn (3, 6, 9)
- Fats Kaplin – pedal steel guitar (3, 4, 7, 8), violin (3, 5, 8), mandolin (8), viola (8)
- Brooke Waggoner – piano (3, 4, 6–9), organ (3, 4)
- Wayne Bergeron – trumpet (3, 6, 9)
- Rita Andrade – viola (3, 6, 9)
- Andrew Bulbrook – violin (3, 6, 9)
- Wynton Grant – violin (3, 6, 9)
- Greg Huckins – woodwinds (3, 6, 9)
- Mark Hollingsworth – woodwinds (3, 6, 9)

Technical

- Patrick Hyland – production, mixing, recording
- Bob Weston – mastering
- Michael Harris – engineering
- Nate Haessly – engineering

== Charts ==
=== Weekly charts ===
Weekly chart performance for The Land Is Inhospitable and So Are We
Chart (2023)	Peak position
Australian Albums (ARIA)	13
Austrian Albums (Ö3 Austria)	60
Belgian Albums (Ultratop Flanders)	23
Belgian Albums (Ultratop Wallonia)	143
Canadian Albums (Billboard)	36
Dutch Albums (Album Top 100)	18
Finnish Albums (Suomen virallinen lista)	38
German Albums (Offizielle Top 100)	30
Irish Albums (Official Charts)	20
Lithuanian Albums (AGATA)	18
New Zealand Albums (RMNZ)	5
Polish Albums (ZPAV)	70
Portuguese Albums (AFP)	7
Scottish Albums (Official Charts)	2
Spanish Albums (Promusicae)	43
Swedish Albums (Sverigetopplistan)	45
Swiss Albums (Schweizer Hitparade)	61
UK Albums (Official Charts)	4
UK Americana Albums (Official Charts)	1
UK Independent Albums (Official Charts)	2
US Billboard 200	12
US Independent Albums (Billboard)	2
US Top Alternative Albums (Billboard)	2
US Top Rock Albums (Billboard)	2

=== Year-end charts ===
Year-end chart performance for The Land Is Inhospitable and So Are We
Chart (2023)	Position
US Top Rock Albums (Billboard)	45

== Certifications ==
Certifications for The Land Is Inhospitable and So Are We
Region	Certification	Certified units/sales
New Zealand (RMNZ)	Gold	7,500^{‡}
United States (RIAA)	Gold	500,000^{‡}
^{‡} Sales+streaming figures based on certification alone.
