= Grammy Award for Best Recording Package =

- Awarded for: Quality visual look of an album
- Country: United States
- Presented by: National Academy of Recording Arts and Sciences
- First award: 1959
- Currently held by: Meghan Foley, Michelle Holme – Tracks II: The Lost Albums (2026)
- Website: grammy.com

The Grammy Award for Best Recording Package is one of a series of Grammy Awards presented for the visual look of an album. It is presented to the art director of the winning album, not to the performer(s), unless the performer is also the art director.

The category dates back to 1974, when the name of the award was Best Album Package. It evolved from the Best Album Cover category, which was retired in 1973 and not revived until 2026. The Best Album Package category was renamed again in 1994 to Best Recording Package.

In 1995, boxed sets were no longer eligible, as they were split off into a separate award known as the Grammy Award for Best Boxed or Special Limited Edition Package. That category merged into the Best Recording Package category in 2026.

== Winners and nominees ==
=== 1970s ===
Year^{[I]}	Work	Art Director(s)	Performing artist(s)
1974
1974	Tommy	Wilkes and Braun	London Symphony Orchestra/Chamber Choir
1974	Billion Dollar Babies	Pacific Eye and Ear	Alice Cooper
1974	Chicago VI	John Berg	Chicago
1974	Chubby Checker's Greatest Hits	Al Steckler	Chubby Checker
1974	Houses of the Holy	Hipgnosis	Led Zeppelin
1974	Los Cochinos	Ode Visuals, Inc.	Cheech & Chong
1974	Ooh La La	Jim Ladwig	Faces
1974	The World of Ike and Tina	Mike Salisbury	Ike and Tina Turner
1975
1975	Come and Gone	Ed Thrasher and Christopher Whorf	Mason Proffit
1975	Cheech and Chong's Wedding Album	Ode Visuals, Inc.	Cheech & Chong
1975	Is It In	Bob Defrin and Basil Pao	Eddie Harris
1975	On Stage	Ron Coro	Kenny Loggins and Jim Messina
1975	Quadrophenia	Ethan A. Russell	The Who
1975	Ride 'Em Cowboy	Eddie Briscoe	Paul B. Davis
1975	Santana's Greatest Hits	John Berg	Santana
1975	That's a Plenty	Herb Greene	The Pointer Sisters
1976
1976	Honey	Jim Ladwig	Ohio Players
1976	Atlantic Crossing	John Kosh	Rod Stewart
1976	Dream	William E. McEuen	Nitty Gritty Dirt Band
1976	One of These Nights	Gary Burden	Eagles
1976	Physical Graffiti	AGI	Led Zeppelin
1976	Playing Possum	Glen Christensen	Carly Simon
1976	Solo Piano	Bob Defrin	Phineas Newborn Jr.
1976	Steppin'	Mick Haggerty	The Pointer Sisters
1976	Wish You Were Here	Hipgnosis	Pink Floyd
1977
1977	Chicago X	John Berg	Chicago
1977	Bellavia	Roland Young	Chuck Mangione
1977	Coney Island Baby	Acy Lehman	Lou Reed
1977	The End of the Beginning	Roland Young	Richie Havens
1977	Mirrors	Roland Young	Peggy Lee
1977	Presence	Hipgnosis and Hardie	Led Zeppelin
1977	Schumann: Symphony No. 1 in B Flat, Op. 38/Manfred: Overture, Op. 115	Joseph Stelmach	Charles Münch conducting Boston Symphony Orchestra
1977	Silk Degrees	Ron Coro and Nancy Donald	Boz Scaggs
1978
1978	Simple Dreams	John Kosh	Linda Ronstadt
1978	Color as a Way of Life	Bob Defrin and Abie Sussman	Lou Donaldson
1978	Ginseng Woman	Paula Scher	Eric Gale
1978	Hejira	Glen Christensen	Joni Mitchell
1978	Love Notes	John Berg	Ramsey Lewis
1978	Singin'	John Kosh	Melissa Manchester
1978	Wings over America	Hipgnosis	Paul McCartney and Wings
1978	Yardbirds Favorites	Paula Scher	The Yardbirds
1979
1979	Boys in the Trees	Tony Lane and Johnny B. Lee	Carly Simon
1979	Bruce Roberts	Tony Lane	Bruce Roberts
1979	The Cars	Ron Coro	The Cars
1979	Children of Sanchez	Junie Osaki	Chuck Mangione
1979	Heads	John Berg and Paula Scher	Bob James
1979	Last Kiss	Tim Bryant	Fandango
1979	Non-Fiction	Barbara Wojirsch	Steve Kuhn
1979	Out of the Woods	Ron Coro and Johnny B. Lee	Oregon

=== 1980s ===
Year^{[I]}	Work	Art Director(s)	Performing artist(s)
1980
1980	Breakfast in America	Mike Doud and Mick Haggerty	Supertramp
1980	Chicago 13	Tony Lane	Chicago
1980	Fear of Music	John Gillespie	Talking Heads
1980	In Through the Out Door	Aubrey Powell	Led Zeppelin
1980	Look Sharp!	Michael Ross	Joe Jackson
1980	Morning Dance	Peter Corriston	Spyro Gyra
1980	Near Perfect/Perfect	Ron Coro and Johnny B. Lee	Martin Mull
1980	Ramsey	John Berg	Ramsey Lewis
1980	With Sound Reason	Lynne Dresse Breslin	Sonny Fortune
1981
1981	Against the Wind	Roy Kohara	Bob Seger & The Silver Bullet Band
1981	Cats	Ron Coro and Johnny B. Lee	Various Artists
1981	Chicago XIV	John Berg	Chicago
1981	One on One	Paula Scher	Bob James and Earl Klugh
1981	Tusk	Nahas Vigon	Fleetwood Mac
1982
1982	Tattoo You	Peter Corriston	The Rolling Stones
1982	Eagles Live	John Kosh	Eagles
1982	Positive Touch	Bush Hollyhead	The Undertones
1982	Social Studies	Carla Bley and Paul McDonough	Carla Bley
1982	Working Class Dog	Mike Doud	Rick Springfield
1983
1983	Get Closer	John Kosh and Ron Larson	Linda Ronstadt
1983	Nothing to Fear	Jules Bates	Oingo Boingo
1983	Ongaku-Kai Live in Japan	George Osaki	The Crusaders
1983	Vacation	Ginger Canzoneri and Mick Haggerty	The Go-Go's
1983	We Are One	Ron Coro and Denise Minobe	Pieces of a Dream
1984
1984	Speaking in Tongues	Robert Rauschenberg	Talking Heads
1984	The Key	Michael Ross	Joan Armatrading
1984	Nothing But the Truth	Richard Seireeni	Mac McAnally
1984	One Night with a Stranger	Bill Levy and Murry Whiteman	Martin Briley
1984	Records	Lynn Dreese Breslin and Bob Defrin	Foreigner
1985
1985	She's So Unusual	Janet Perr	Cyndi Lauper
1985	Bewitched	Michael Ross and Andy Summers	Andy Summers and Robert Fripp
1985	Every Man Has a Woman	Bill Levy	John Lennon, Harry Nilsson, Eddie Money, Rosanne Cash and Others
1985	No Brakes	Henry Marquez	John Waite
1985	Willie Nelson	Bill Johnson, Jeff Morris and Virginia Team	Willie Nelson
1986
1986	Lush Life	John Kosh and Ron Larson	Linda Ronstadt
1986	Hunting High and Low	Jeffrey Kent Ayeroff and Jeri McManus	a-ha
1986	In Square Circle	Rene Hardaway and Johnny B. Lee	Stevie Wonder
1986	Highwayman	Virginia Team	The Highwaymen
1986	Dangerous Moments	Bill Levy, Stan Watts and Murry Whiteman	Martin Briley
1987
1987	Tutu	Eiko Ishioka	Miles Davis
1987	Songs Unspoken	Buddy Jackson	Douglas Trowbridge
1987	Stereotomy	Colin Chambers and Andrew Ellis	The Alan Parsons Project
1987	True Stories	Jeffrey Kent Ayeroff and Michael Hodgson	Talking Heads
1987	The Voice: The Columbia Years 1943–1952	John Berg	Frank Sinatra
1988
1988	King's Record Shop	Bill Johnson	Rosanne Cash
1988	Document	Ron Scarselli	R.E.M.
1988	Duke Ellington: The Blanton-Webster Band	Joseph Stelmach	Duke Ellington
1988	Echelons	Bruce Licher	For Against
1988	Shaka Zulu	Peter Barrett	Ladysmith Black Mambazo
1989
1989	Tired of the Runnin'	Bill Johnson	The O'Kanes
1989	Bête Noire	Bryan Ferry and Andrew Reid	Bryan Ferry
1989	Brian Wilson	Jeri Heiden	Brian Wilson
1989	Our Beloved Revolutionary Sweetheart	Bruce Licher	Camper Van Beethoven
1989	Picture This	Henry Marquez	The Valentine Brothers

=== 1990s ===
Year^{[I]}	Work	Art Director(s)	Performing artist(s)
1990
1990	Sound + Vision	Roger Gorman	David Bowie
1990	Batman (Limited Edition)	Tom Recchion	Prince
1990	Foreign Affair (Special Limited Edition)	Bill Burks and Tommy Steele	Tina Turner
1990	Monster	Tommy Steele	Fetchin Bones
1990	World in Motion	Jimmy Wachtel	Jackson Browne
1991
1991	Days of Open Hand	Jeff Gold, Len Peltier and Suzanne Vega	Suzanne Vega
1991	Compositions (Special Edition Blue Binder Cover)	Anita Baker, Carol Bobolts and Jim Ladwig	Anita Baker
1991	Behind the Mask	Jeri Heiden	Fleetwood Mac
1991	Bossanova	Vaughan Oliver	Pixies
1991	Songs for Drella (Special Edition Black Velvet)	Tom Recchion	Lou Reed and John Cale
1992
1992	Billie Holiday: The Complete Decca Recordings	Vartan	Billie Holiday
1992	Beat the Boots (Limited Edition Box Set)	Geoff Gans	Frank Zappa
1992	Just for the Record	Gabrielle Raumberger	Barbra Streisand
1992	Mighty Like a Rose (Special Package)	Steven Baker and Dirk Walter	Elvis Costello
1992	Recycler (Special Package)	Kim Champagne and Jeff Gold	ZZ Top
1993
1993	Spellbound (Compact)	Melanie Nissen	Paula Abdul
1993	99.9F° (Special Package)	Len Peltier	Suzanne Vega
1993	Elvis: The King of Rock 'n' Roll — The Complete 50's Masters	Ria Lewerke and Norman Moore	Elvis Presley
1993	Queen of Soul: The Atlantic Recordings	Geoff Gans	Aretha Franklin
1993	Too Legit to Quit (Special Package)	Tommy Steele and Stephen Walker	MC Hammer
1994
1994	The Complete Billie Holiday on Verve 1945–1959	David Lau	Billie Holiday
1994	14 Songs	Kim Champagne and Jeff Gold	Paul Westerberg
1994	Automatic for the People (2nd Set)	Jeff Gold, Jim Ladwig, Tom Recchion and Michael Stipe	R.E.M.
1994	Live and Loud	David Coleman	Ozzy Osbourne
1994	Shine On	Storm Thorgerson	Pink Floyd
1995
1995	Tribute to the Music of Bob Wills and the Texas Playboys	Buddy Jackson	Asleep at the Wheel
1995	Boingo	Deborah Norcross	Oingo Boingo
1995	Jar of Flies	Mary Maurer	Alice in Chains
1995	Secret World Live	Michael Coulson and Martha Ladly	Peter Gabriel
1995	Very Relentless	Mark Farrow, Pet Shop Boys and Daniel Weil	Pet Shop Boys
1996
1996	Turbulent Indigo	Robbie Cavolina and Joni Mitchell	Joni Mitchell
1996	Mirror Ball	Gary Burden	Neil Young
1996	Mountains of Madness	Stefan Sagmeister	H.P. Zinker
1996	This Is Fort Apache	Tim Stedman	Various Artists
1996	Vitalogy	Joel Zimmerman	Pearl Jam
1997
1997	Ultra-Lounge (Leopard Skin Sampler)	Andy Engel and Tommy Steele	Various Artists
1997	Ænima	Adam Jones and Kevin Willis	Tool
1997	East of the Sun: The West Coast Sessions	Chika Azuma and Patricia Lie	Stan Getz
1997	Miracle of Science	Stefan Sagmeister	Marshall Crenshaw
1997	Set the Twilight Reeling	Stefan Sagmeister	Lou Reed
1998
1998	Titanic: Music as Heard on the Fateful Voyage	Hugh Brown, Al Quattrocchi and Jeff Smith	Various Artists
1998	Fantastic Spikes Through Balloon	Stefan Sagmeister	Skeleton Key
1998	Free Mars	Paul D'Amour, Peter Grant and Stephanie Hughes	Lusk
1998	Le Roi Est Mort, Vive Le Roi!	Johann Zambryski	Enigma
1998	The Planet Sleeps	Julian Peploe	Various Artists
1999
1999	Ray of Light	Kevin Reagan	Madonna
1999	Big Bad Voodoo Daddy	Brad Benedict, Andy Engel and Scotty Morris	Big Bad Voodoo Daddy
1999	Los Super Seven	Gina R. Binkley and Susan Eaddy	Los Super Seven
1999	Readings by Jack Kerouac on the Beat Generation	Chika Azuma	Jack Kerouac
1999	Yield	Barry Ament, George Estrada, Pearl Jam and Coby Schultz	Pearl Jam

=== 2000s ===
Year^{[I]}	Work	Art Director(s)	Performing artist(s)
2000
2000	Ride with Bob	Ray Benson, Sally Carns and Buddy Jackson	Asleep at the Wheel
2000	Bleecker Street: Greenwich Village in the 60's	Carla Leighton	Various Artists
2000	Late Night Sessions	Tammy Dotson, Michael Hodgson and Clive Piercy	Caravana Cubana
2000	Ultra-Lounge: Tiki Sampler	Brad Benedict, Andy Engel, Johnny B. Lee and Tommy Steele	Various Artists
2000	Vacancy	Joseph Arthur and Zachary Larner	Joseph Arthur
2001
2001	Music	Kevin Reagan	Madonna
2001	The Concert for García Lorca	Dan Ibarra and Kevin Wade	Ben Sidran
2001	Machina/The Machines of God	Billy Corgan, Gregory Sylvester, Thomas Wolfe and Yelena Yemchuk	The Smashing Pumpkins
2001	The Shaming of the True	Hugh Brown and John Seabury	Kevin Gilbert
2001	Zenith	Rachel Gutek and Jonathan Lea	The Jigsaw Seen
2002
2002	Amnesiac (Special Limited Edition)	Stanley Donwood and Tchocky	Radiohead
2002	Bedlam Ballroom	Lane Wurster	Squirrel Nut Zippers
2002	Levee Town	Megan Barra	Sonny Landreth
2002	Look into the Eyeball	Stephen Doyle	David Byrne
2002	Reveal	Chris Bilheimer and Michael Stipe	R.E.M.
2003
2003	Home	Kevin Reagan	Dixie Chicks
2003	Dirty Vegas	Simon Earith	Dirty Vegas
2003	The Great Divide	Rick Patrick	Willie Nelson
2003	Release	Greg Foley	Pet Shop Boys
2003	Worship and Tribute	Justin Beck and Mick Haggerty	Glassjaw
2004
2004	Evolve	Ani DiFranco and Brian Grunert	Ani DiFranco
2004	In Bright Mansions	Jim McAnally	The Fisk Jubilee Singers
2004	Plow to the End of the Row	Jami Anderson	Adrienne Young
2004	The Road to Bliss	Bill Dolan and Cathy Richardson	Cathy Richardson Band
2004	( )	Orri Páll Dýrason, Georg Hólm, Jón Þór Birgisson, Kjartan Sveinsson and Alex Torrance	Sigur Rós
2005
2005	A Ghost Is Born	Peter Buchanan-Smith and Dan Nadel	Wilco
2005	Chutes Too Narrow	Jesse LeDoux	The Shins
2005	Educated Guess	Ani DiFranco and Brian Grunert	Ani DiFranco
2005	To the 5 Boroughs	Nathaniel Hörnblowér and Dechen Wangdu	Beastie Boys
2005	The Wandering Accordion	Qing-Yang Xiao	Various Artists
2006
2006	The Forgotten Arm	Aimee Mann and Gail Marowitz	Aimee Mann
2006	The Clouds	Stuart Hyatt	Stuart Hyatt and Community
2006	The Cosmic Game	Neal Ashby	Thievery Corporation
2006	Knuckle Down	Ani DiFranco and Brian Grunert	Ani DiFranco
2006	O God, the Aftermath	Ryan Clark	Norma Jean
2007
2007	10,000 Days	Adam Jones	Tool
2007	The Best Worst-Case Scenario	Ryan Clark	Fair
2007	Personal File	Randall Martin	Johnny Cash
2007	Reprieve	Ani DiFranco and Brian Grunert	Ani DiFranco
2007	Versions	Neal Ashby and Matthew Curry	Thievery Corporation
2008
2008	Cassadaga	Zachary Nipper	Bright Eyes
2008	The Dio Years	Masaki Koike	Black Sabbath
2008	Friend and Foe	Craig Thompson	Menomena
2008	Secrets Keep You Sick	Don Clark	The Fold
2008	White Horse	Qing-Yang Xiao	GTS
2009
2009	Death Magnetic	Bruce Duckworth, Sarah Moffat and David Turner	Metallica
2009	Hawk Nelson...Is My Friend!	Don Clark	Hawk Nelson
2009	Nouns	No Age and Brian Roettinger	No Age
2009	Radio Retaliation	Neal Ashby, Matthew Curry and Patrick Donohue	Thievery Corporation
2009	Summer Rains	Amanda Barrett, Abby DeWald, Renee Jablow and Rick Whitmore	The Ditty Bops

=== 2010s ===
Year^{[I]}	Work	Art Director(s)	Performing artist(s)
2010
2010	Everything That Happens Will Happen Today	Stefan Sagmeister	David Byrne and Brian Eno
2010	Back from the Dead	Brian Porizek	Spinal Tap
2010	Middle Cyclone	Neko Case and Kathleen Judge	Neko Case
2010	Splitting Adam	Jeff Harrison	Splitting Adam
2010	Tathagata	Szu Wei Cheng and Hui Chen Huang	Various Artists
2011
2011	Brothers	Michael Carney	The Black Keys
2011	Eggs	Malthe Fischer, Malene Mathiasson, Kristoffer Rom, Nis Svoldgård and Aske Zidore	Oh No Ono
2011	Hadestown	Brian Grunert, Anaïs Mitchell and Peter Nevins	Anaïs Mitchell
2011	What Will We Be	Devendra Banhart and Jon Beasley	Devendra Banhart
2011	Yonkers NY	Andrew Taray	Chip Taylor
2012
2012	Scenes from the Suburbs	Caroline Robert	Arcade Fire
2012	Chickenfoot III	Todd Gallopo	Chickenfoot
2012	Good Luck & True Love	Sarah Dodds and Shauna Dodds	Reckless Kelly
2012	Rivers and Homes	Jonathan Dagan	J.Viewz
2012	Watch the Throne	Virgil Abloh and Riccardo Tisci	Jay-Z and Kanye West
2013
2013	Biophilia	Michael Amzalag and Mathias Augustyniak	Björk
2013	Boys & Girls	Brett Kilroe	Alabama Shakes
2013	Charmer	Gail Marowitz	Aimee Mann
2013	Love This Giant	Noah Wall	David Byrne and St. Vincent
2013	Swing Lo Magellan	David Longstreth	Dirty Projectors
2014
2014	Long Night Moon	Sarah Dodds and Shauna Dodds	Reckless Kelly
2014	Automatic Music Can Be Fun	Mike Brown, Zac DeCamp, Brian Grunert and Annie Stoll	Geneseo
2014	Magna Carta...Holy Grail	Brian Roettinger	Jay-Z
2014	Metallica Through the Never	Bruce Duckworth, Sarah Moffat, Brian Steele and David Turner	Metallica
2014	The Next Day	Jonathan Barnbrook	David Bowie
2015
2015	Lightning Bolt	Jeff Ament, Don Pendleton, Joe Spix and Jerome Turner	Pearl Jam
2015	Formosa Medicine Show	David Chen and Andrew Wong	The Muddy Basin Ramblers
2015	Indie Cindy	Vaughan Oliver	Pixies
2015	LP1	Jesse Kanda	FKA twigs
2015	Whispers	Sarah Larnach	Passenger
2016
2016	Still the King: Celebrating the Music of Bob Wills and His Texas Playboys	Sarah Dodds, Shauna Dodds and Dick Reeves	Asleep at the Wheel
2016	Alagoas	Alex Trochut	Alagoas
2016	Bush	Anita Marisa Boriboon and Phi Hollinger	Snoop Dogg
2016	How Big, How Blue, How Beautiful (Deluxe Edition)	Brian Roettinger	Florence + the Machine
2016	My Happiness	Nathanio Strimpopulos and Jack White	Elvis Presley
2017
2017	Blackstar	Jonathan Barnbrook	David Bowie
2017	22, A Million	Eric Timothy Carlson	Bon Iver
2017	Anti (Deluxe Edition)	Robyn Fenty, Roy Nachum and Ciarra Pardo	Rihanna
2017	Human Performance	Andrew Savage	Parquet Courts
2017	Sunset Motel	Sarah Dodds and Shauna Dodds	Reckless Kelly
2018
2018	El Orisha De La Rosa (TIE)	Carlos Dussán, Juliana Jaramillo, Juan Felipe Martínez and Claudio Roncoli	Magín Díaz
2018	Pure Comedy (Deluxe Edition) (TIE)	Sasha Barr, Ed Steed and Josh Tillman	Father John Misty
2018	Mura Masa	Alex Crossan and Matt de Jong	Mura Masa
2018	Sleep Well Beast	Elyanna Blaser-Gould, Luke Hayman and Andrea Trabucco-Campos	The National
2018	Solid State	Gail Marowitz	Jonathan Coulton
2019
2019	Masseduction	Willo Perron	St. Vincent
2019	Be the Cowboy	Mary Banas	Mitski
2019	Love Yourself: Tear	Doohee Lee	BTS
2019	The Offering	Qing-Yang Xiao	The Chairman
2019	Well Kept Thing	Adam Moore	Foxhole

=== 2020s ===
Year^{[I]}	Work	Art Director(s)	Performing artist(s)
2020
2020	Chris Cornell	Barry Ament, Jeff Ament and Joe Spix	Chris Cornell
2020	Anónimas & Resilientes	Luisa María Arango, Carlos Dussan, Manuel García-Orozco and Juliana Jaramillo-Buenaventura	Voces del Bullerengue
2020	Hold That Tiger	Andrew Wong and Fongming Yang	The Muddy Basin Ramblers
2020	I,I	Aaron Anderson and Eric Timothy Carlson	Bon Iver
2020	Intellexual	Irwan Awalludin	Intellexual
2021
2021	Vols. 11 & 12	Doug Cunningham and Jason Noto	The Desert Sessions
2021	Everyday Life	Pilar Zeta	Coldplay
2021	Funeral	Kyle Goen and Alex Kalatschinow	Lil Wayne
2021	Healer	Julian Gross and Hannah Hooper	Grouplove
2021	On Circles	Jordan Butcher	Caspian
2022
2022	Pakelang	Li Jheng Han and Yu Wei	2nd Generation Falangao Singing Group and The Chairman Crossover Big Band
2022	American Jackpot / American Girls	Sarah Dodds and Shauna Dodds	Reckless Kelly
2022	Carnage	Nick Cave and Tom Hingston	Nick Cave and Warren Ellis
2022	Serpentine Prison	Dale Doyle	Matt Berninger
2022	Zeta	Xiao Qing Yang	Soul of Ears
2023
2023	Beginningless Beginning	Chun-Tien Hsiao and Qing-Yang Xiao	Tamsu-Kavalan Chinese Orchestra
2023	Divers	William Stichter	Soporus
2023	Everything Was Beautiful	Mark Farrow and Jason Pierce	Spiritualized
2023	Telos	Ming Liu	Fann
2023	Voyeurist	Joel Cook, Brandon Rike and Nate Utesch	Underoath
2024
2024	Stumpwork	Annie Collinge and Rottingdean Bazaar	Dry Cleaning
2024	The Art of Forgetting	Caroline Rose	Caroline Rose
2024	Cadenza 21'	Hsing-Hui Cheng	Ensemble Cadenza 21'
2024	Electrophonic Chronic	Perry Shall	The Arcs
2024	Gravity Falls	iam8bit	Brad Breeck
2024	Migration	Chang Yu Chung, Li Jheng Han and Yu Wei	Leaf Yeh
2025
2025	Brat	Charli XCX, Brent David Freaney and Imogene Strauss	Charli XCX
2025	The Avett Brothers	Scott Avett, Jonny Black and Giorgia Sage	The Avett Brothers
2025	Baker Hotel	Sarah Dodds and Shauna Dodds	William Clark Green
2025	F-1 Trillion	Archie Lee Coates IV, Jeffrey Franklin, Bobby Greenleaf, Blossom Liu, Kylie McMahon, Ana Cecilia Thompson Motta and Austin Post	Post Malone
2025	Hounds of Love: The Baskerville Edition	Kate Bush and Albert McIntosh	Kate Bush
2025	Jug Band Millionaire	Andrew Wong and Julie Yeh	The Muddy Basin Ramblers
2025	Pregnancy, Breakdown and Disease	Lee Pei-Tzu	WhoiWhoo
2026
2026	Tracks II: The Lost Albums	Meghan Foley and Michelle Holme	Bruce Springsteen
2026	And the Adjacent Possible	Hà Trịnh Quốc Bảo, Damian Kulash Jr., Claudio Ripol, Wombi Rose and Yuri Suzuki	OK Go
2026	Balloonerism	Bráulio Amado and Alim Smith	Mac Miller
2026	Danse Macabre: De Luxe	Rory McCartney	Duran Duran
2026	Loud Is As	Farbod Kokabi and Emily Sneddon	Tsunami
2026	Sequoia	Tim Breen and Ken Shipley	Various Artists
2026	The Spins (Picture Disc Vinyl)	Miller McCormick and Darby Kaighin-Shields	Mac Miller
2027	Coloring Book	Alec Longstreth and Joe Spinelli	Weezer
2027	Horizons/West	Jordan Butcher	Thrice
2027	If You Can Hold Your Breath	Farbod Kokabi	Karate
2027	Nothing's About to Happen to Me	Mary Banas, Marc Burkhardt and Mitski Miyawaki	Mitski
2027	Power to the People	Simon Hilton, Liz Hirsch and Sean Ono Lennon	John Lennon and Yoko Ono/Plastic Ono Band with Elephant's Memory and Special Guests

== Multiple wins ==
3 wins

- John Kosh
- Kevin Reagan

2 wins

- Jeff Ament
- Sarah Dodds
- Shauna Dodds
- Buddy Jackson
- Bill Johnson
- Ron Larson
- Joe Spix

== Multiple nominations ==
8 nominations

- John Berg

7 nominations

- Ron Coro

6 nominations

- Sarah Dodds
- Shauna Dodds
- Brian Grunert
- John Kosh
- Johnny B. Lee
- Tommy Steele

5 nominations

- Stefan Sagmeister

4 nominations

- Bob Defrin
- Ani DiFranco
- Jeff Gold
- Mick Haggerty
- Hipgnosis
- Jim Ladwig
- Paula Scher
- Qing-Yang Xiao

3 nominations

- Neal Ashby
- Andy Engel
- Buddy Jackson
- Tony Lane
- Bill Levy
- Gail Marowitz
- Kevin Reagan
- Brian Roettinger
- Michael Ross
- Andrew Wong
- Roland Young

2 nominations

- Barry Ament
- Jeffrey Kent Ayeroff
- Chika Azuma
- Jonathan Barnbrook
- Brad Benedict
- Hugh Brown
- Gary Burden
- Eric Timothy Carlson
- Kim Champagne
- Glen Christensen
- Don Clark
- Ryan Clark
- Peter Corriston
- Matthew Curry
- Mike Doud
- Bruce Duckworth
- Carlos Dussán
- Mark Farrow
- Geoff Gans
- Li Jheng Han
- Jeri Heiden
- Michael Hodgson
- Juliana Jaramillo
- Adam Jones
- Bruce Licher
- Henry Marquez
- Sarah Moffat
- Ode Visuals, Inc.
- Vaughan Oliver
- Len Peltier
- Tom Recchion
- Joseph Stelmach
- Michael Stipe
- Virginia Team
- David Turner
- Yu Wei
- Murry Whiteman
