= Julian Casablancas discography =

This article presents the complete discography of Julian Casablancas as a solo artist.

== Studio albums ==
List of studio albums, with selected chart positions, sales figures and certifications
Title	Details	Peak chart positions									
Title	Details	US	US Alt	US Rock	BEL	FRA	IRE	NZ	SWE	SWI	UK
Phrazes for the Young	Release date: November 3, 2009; Label: Cult via Rough Trade (UK), Cult via RCA (US & Europe); Formats: CD, music download, Vinyl	35	10	12	96	49	30	34	49	64	19

== Extended plays ==
List of EPs, showing year released and EP name
Title	Details
Live from Electric Lady Studios, WRXP New York	Release date: 2010; Label: RCA; Format: Digital

== Singles ==
=== As lead artist ===
List of singles as lead artist, with selected chart positions and certifications, showing year released and album name
Single	Year	Peak positions			Album
Single	Year	BEL (Fl)	BEL (Wa)	JPN	Album
"My Drive Thru" (with Santigold and Pharrell Williams)	2008	—	—	—	Non-album single
"11th Dimension"	2009	(Note: "11th Dimension" did not enter the official Belgian Ultratop/Fl 50 charts, but peaked at number 13 on the Bubbling Under Ultratip charts.)	(Note: "11th Dimension" did not enter the official Belgian Ultratop/Wa 50 charts, but peaked at number 25 on the Bubbling Under Ultratip charts.)	48	Phrazes for the Young
"I Wish It Was Christmas Today"	2009	—	—	—	Non-album single
"Out of the Blue"	2010	—	—	—	Phrazes for the Young
"Boy/Girl" (with Jehnny Beth)	2015	—	—	—	Non-album single
"—" denotes releases that did not chart

=== As featured artist ===
List of singles as featured artist, with selected chart positions and certifications, showing year released and album name
Title	Year	Peak positions										Certifications	Album
Title	Year	US	US Dance	AUT	BEL	FIN	FRA	GER	SWE	SWI	UK	Certifications	Album
"Sick, Sick, Sick" (Queens of the Stone Age)	2007	—	—	65	—	18	—	77	—	—	165		Era Vulgaris
"Instant Crush" (Daft Punk featuring Julian Casablancas)	2013	— (Note: "Instant Crush" did not enter the Billboard Hot 100, but peaked at number 16 on the Bubbling Under Hot 100 Singles chart.)	20	—	5	—	4	—	37	40	198	RIAA: Platinum; BPI: Silver; SNEP: Gold	Random Access Memories
"Infinity Repeating (2013 Demo)" (Daft Punk featuring Julian Casablancas + The Voidz)	2023	—	—	—	—	—	—	—	—	—	—		Random Access Memories (10th Anniversary Edition)
"—" denotes releases that did not chart

== Collaborations ==
List of non-single guest appearances, with other performing artists, showing year released and album name
Song	Year	Artist	Album
"Boombox"	2009	The Lonely Island	Incredibad
"Little Girl"	2010	Danger Mouse and Sparklehorse	Dark Night of the Soul
"No One There"	2017	Exhibition	Last Dance
"Mean Girls"	2024	Charli XCX	Brat and It's Completely Different but Also Still Brat

== Other appearances ==
Year	Album	Contributed track
2011	Rave On Buddy Holly	"Rave On"
2016	Vinyl: Music from the HBO® Original Series - Vol. 1.2	"Run Run Run"
2016	Vinyl: Music from the HBO® Original Series - Vol. 1.5	"White Light White Heat (Rock n Roll Animal Live Era Version)"
2016	Vinyl: Music from the HBO® Original Series – The Essentials: Best of Season 1	"Venus in Furs"

== Music videos ==
Year	Title	Album
2008	"My Drive Thru" (with Santigold and Pharrell Williams)	non-album
2009	"11th Dimension"	Phrazes for the Young
2010	"Boombox" (The Lonely Island featuring Julian Casablancas)	Incredibad
2013	"Instant Crush" (Daft Punk featuring Julian Casablancas)	Random Access Memories
2023	"Infinity Repeating (2013 Demo)" (Daft Punk featuring Julian Casablancas + The Voidz)	Random Access Memories (10th Anniversary Edition)
