= Caroline Rose =

American singer (born 1989)

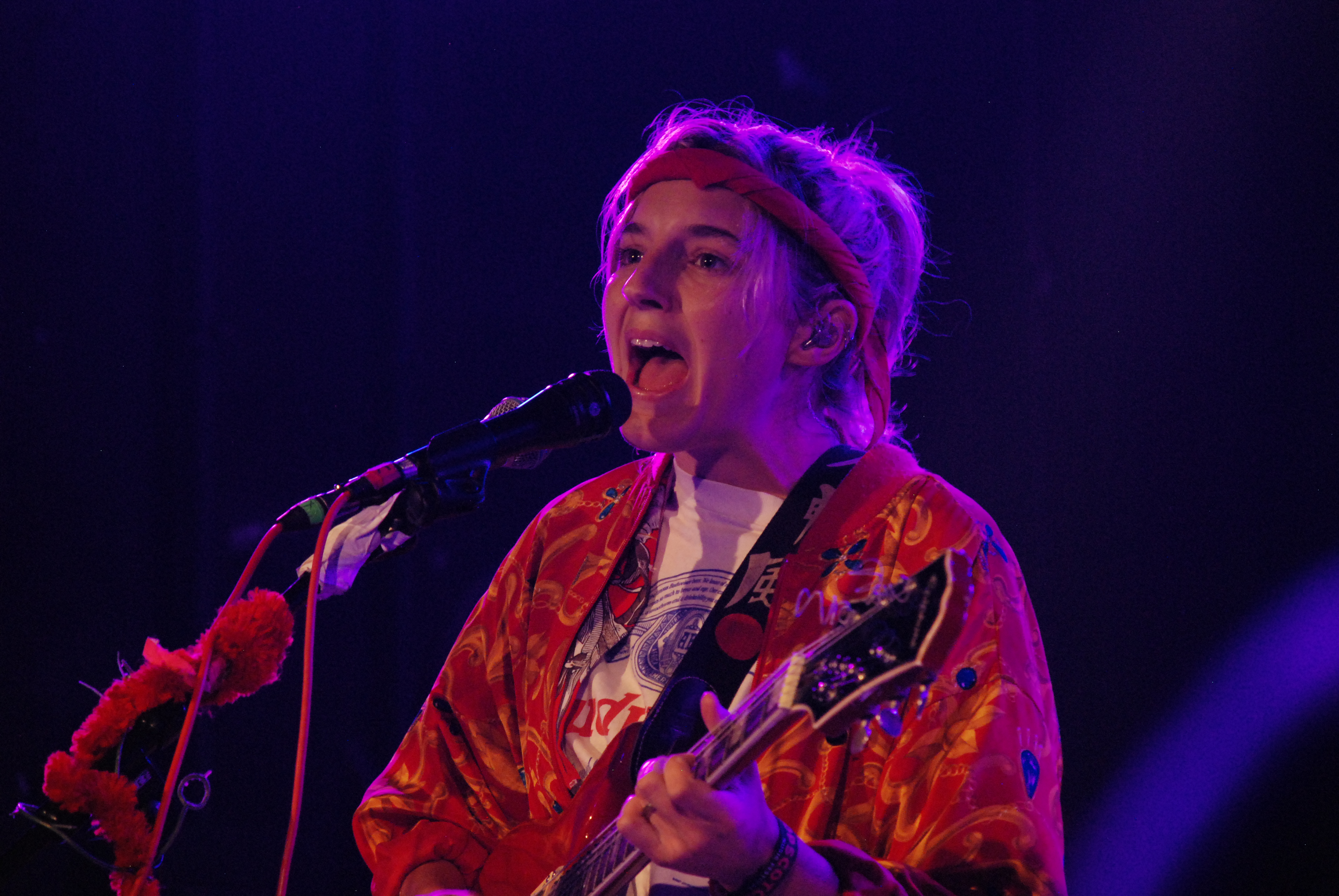
- Rose performing in 2019

Background information
- Born: Caroline Elizabeth Rose; October 19, 1989 (age 37); Long Island, New York, U.S.
- Genres: Indie pop; indie rock
- Occupations: Singer; songwriter; musician; producer
- Instruments: Vocals; guitar; keyboard; bass guitar; piano
- Years active: 2012–present
- Labels: New West, Mom + Pop Music
- Website: carolinerosemusic.com

Caroline Elizabeth Rose (born October 19, 1989) is an American singer, songwriter, musician and producer. After releasing two records of folk and country-inspired music, she released a pop-rock album Loner in 2018. Superstar was released on March 6, 2020. The Art of Forgetting, was released on March 24, 2023, and her Bandcamp-exclusive album Year of the Slug was released on February 7, 2025. Her most recent album, Gentling the Horse at the Walt Whitman Mall, was released on October 23, 2026.

== Early life ==
Born in 1989 on Long Island, Rose grew up in Center Moriches, New York. The daughter of two artists, Rose began writing songs and poems at age 13. Rose attended Wellesley College in Massachusetts, where she graduated in 2011 with a bachelor's degree in architecture.

== Career ==
In 2012, Rose and producer/multi-instrumentalist Jer Coons launched a Kickstarter to fund the production of Rose's first album America Religious. The album, blending American folk music, country, and rockabilly styles was self-published later that year. Two years later, Rose released her first nationally distributed album, I Will Not Be Afraid on Little Hi! Records. Like the first album, it was produced with Jer Coons and featured music in a variety of Americana musical styles, including two songs previously released on America Religious.

Following the release of I Will Not Be Afraid, Rose took an extended hiatus from touring and releasing new material, while she explored new musical directions that would broaden her sound. After three years, numerous personnel changes, a signing to Mom + Pop Music, and a switch to New West Records, Rose released her third album. The album, Loner, was co-produced by Rose and Paul Butler of The Bees, and represented a radical shift away from the musical style of her previous work, blending pop and alternative rock elements, and incorporating prominent synthesizers throughout. Notably, this album also saw a change in lyrical tone, incorporating a number of overtly humorous, sarcastic, and satirical songs. Although Rose played most of the instruments on the album, she formed a new band to perform on tour.

Prior to Loner's release, Rose released "Money" and "Soul No. 5" with accompanying music videos. Rose released a music video for "Jeannie Becomes a Mom" on October 17, 2018. The video, which was directed by Amanda Speva, features Abby Pierce as the titular character, depicting Jeannie moving into a new home, performing a dance routine with the movers, and preparing a rainbow Jell-O cake. The song was ranked the fifteenth-best single of the year by National Public Radio.

On January 7, 2020, Rose announced a new album called Superstar, releasing a single and a music video for the song "Feel The Way I Want". The video was shot on an iPhone over the course of an 11-day roadtrip from Hollywood, California to Hollywood, Florida, documenting the protagonist's journey after she travels to the wrong Hollywood for an audition. According to Rose, the album is a "cinematic pop album that tells a story of someone who leaves behind everything they know and love in search for something bigger and more glamorous. It's a story about losing yourself but also finding the brazen self-confidence to follow a dream." The album Superstar was released on March 6, 2020, and Caroline Rose made her television debut on February 24, 2020, performing "Feel The Way I Want" on Late Night with Seth Meyers.

In June 2022, Rose announced that she would release her fifth studio album in March 2023. The New York Times called the first single, "Love / Lover / Friend", one of the best songs of 2023, "In a flurry of plucked and orchestral strings, Caroline Rose affirms her love by ruling out other possibilities, then basks in wordless choral ecstasy." This was followed by releases of "Miami", "The Doldrums", and "Tell Me What You Want". The latter and "Miami" were accompanied by music videos on Rose's YouTube channel. These form two chapters of then unreleased short film.

Said film follows the story of Rose and her partner, portrayed by Massima Bell, and was filmed in Austin, Texas. The film, "a single continuous narrative of disintegrating time loops, splintering romantic and existential relationships and intricately choreographed long takes", was released in June 2024.

The packaging for The Art of Forgetting was nominated for Best Recording Package in the 66th Annual GRAMMY Awards, which took place February 4, 2024.

Caroline played in the live band for Kairos Creature Club during her Live on KEXP session, released on July 31, 2024.

In August 2026, she released "Chow Mein" as a single for her album Gentling the Horse at the Walt Whitman Mall, which released on October 23, 2026. She is scheduled to tour with Modest Mouse in 2026.

== Personal life ==
Rose uses they/them and she/her pronouns and identifies as queer. She lives in Los Angeles, California.

== Discography ==
=== Studio albums ===
- America Religious (2012)
- I Will Not Be Afraid (2014)
- Loner (2018)
- Superstar (2020)
- The Art of Forgetting (2023)
- Year of the Slug (2025)
- Gentling the Horse at the Walt Whitman Mall (2026)

=== Singles ===
Title	Year	Peak chart positions	Album
Title	Year	US AAA	Album
"Blood on Your Bootheels"	2014	—	I Will Not Be Afraid
"Money"	2017	—	Loner
"Soul No. 5"	2018	—	Loner
"Getting to Me"	2018	—	Loner
"Feel the Way I Want"	2019	21	Superstar
"Freak Like Me"	2019	—	Superstar
"Do You Think We'll Last Forever?"	2019	—	Superstar
"Love / Lover / Friend"	2022	—	The Art of Forgetting
"Miami"	2023	—	The Art of Forgetting
"The Doldrums"	2023	—	The Art of Forgetting
"Tell Me What You Want"	2023	—	The Art of Forgetting
"Yip Yip Yow"	2026	24	Gentling the Horse at the Walt Whitman Mall

=== Other appearances ===
Title	Year	Other artists	Album
"Perfect" - Caroline Rose Remix	2023	Bayonne	Perfect (Caroline Rose Remix)
"Lucifer on the Sofa"- Background Vocals	2022	Spoon	Lucifer on the Sofa
"The Hardest Cut"- Background Vocals	2022	Spoon	Lucifer on the Sofa
"The Fight" – Caroline Rose Remix	2020	Overcoats	The Fight (Remixed)
"Get Bit" – Caroline Rose Remix	2021	All Things Blue	All Things Remixed
"Breathe" featuring Caroline Rose	2021	Lawrence Rothman	Good Morning, America
"You Are Enough" – Caroline Rose Remix	2021	Ron Gallo	You Are Enough (Caroline Rose Remix)
