= The Art of Forgetting =

Studio album by Caroline Rose
- Released: March 24, 2023
- Genres: Indie folk; art pop
- Label: New West
- Producer: Caroline Rose

Caroline Rose chronology
Superstar (2020)	The Art of Forgetting (2023)	Year of the Slug (2025)

Singles from The Art of Forgetting
- 1. "Love / Lover / Friend" Released: 26 October 2022; 2. "Miami" Released: 19 January 2023; 3. "The Doldrums" Released: 15 February 2023; 4. "Tell Me What You Want" Released: 8 March 2023

Professional ratings
Aggregate scores
Source	Rating
Metacritic	81/100
Review scores
Source	Rating
Pitchfork	6.8/10
Under The Radar	8.5/10

The Art of Forgetting is the Grammy-nominated fifth studio album by American singer-songwriter Caroline Rose. It was released on March 24, 2023, under New West Records.

== Release and promotion ==
In June 2022, Rose announced that she would release her fifth studio album in March 2023.

In October 2022, the song "Love / Lover / Friend" was released. The New York Times called it one of the best songs of 2023, saying "In a flurry of plucked and orchestral strings, Caroline Rose affirms her love by ruling out other possibilities, then basks in wordless choral ecstasy."

This was followed by releases of "Miami", "The Doldrums", and "Tell Me What You Want". The latter and "Miami" were accompanied by music videos on Rose's YouTube channel. These form two chapters of a short film. Said film follows the story of Rose and her partner, portrayed by Massima Bell, and was filmed in Austin, Texas.

"The Doldrums" was released to YouTube and accompanied by a visualizer video.

The album was released in both digital and physical form on March 24, 2023. Copies of the album were sold on 12-inch LP vinyl (with editions including brown- and green-colored vinyl, and a special edition with a Lenticular Gatefold), compact disc, and bright green cassettes. Merchandise includes a promotional box of matches.

The packaging for The Art of Forgetting was nominated for Best Recording Package in the 66th Annual GRAMMY Awards, which took place on February 4, 2024.

== Track listing ==
All tracks are written by Caroline Rose, except where noted.

The Art Of Forgetting track listing
No.	Title	Length
1.	"Love / Lover / Friend"	4:01
2.	"Rebirth"	3:24
3.	"Miami"	4:14
4.	"Better Than Gold"	0:54
5.	"Everywhere I Go I Bring the Rain"	5:04
6.	"The Doldrums"	3:40
7.	"The Kiss"	6:10
8.	"Cornbread"	0:45
9.	"Stockholm Syndrome"	1:45
10.	"Tell Me What You Want"	4:02
11.	"Florida Room"	0:26
12.	"Love Song for Myself"	3:59
13.	"Jill Says"	5:47
14.	"Where Do I Go from Here?"	6:46
Total length:		51:32
