= The Dance Age =

EP by The Muddy Basin Ramblers
- Released: 2016
- Producer: David Chen

The Muddy Basin Ramblers chronology
Formosa Medicine Show (2013)	The Dance Age (2016)	Hold That Tiger (2018)

The Dance Age is the first EP released by The Muddy Basin Ramblers. It was released alongside a collaborative project with Naughty Swing, a swing dancing troupe based in Taipei, Taiwan. A music video covering the 1938 Taiwanese classic Dance Age was released alongside the EP.

The album was designed by Onion Design Associates. The collaboration between the band and Onion has produced three Grammy-nominated albums released before and after The Dance Age.

== Track listing ==
No.	Title	Length
1.	"跳舞時代 The Dance Age"	3:37
2.	"Jerry the Junker"	4:45
3.	"Crazy About Nancy Jane"	3:50
4.	"Raise a Ruckus Tonight"	3:32
5.	"給我吻一下 Give Me a Little Kiss"	2:55
6.	"The Dance Age (78 RPM Version)"	3:43
7.	"The Dance Age (Chamber Remix)"	4:00
8.	"The Dance Age (Naughty Swing Version)"	2:49
