= TC Lin =

TC Lin (Chinese: 林道明; pinyin: Lín Dàomíng), previously known as Thomas Christopher Locke or TC Locke, is an American-born Taiwanese photographer, writer, and filmmaker. A former U.S. citizen, he renounced his U.S. citizenship to naturalise in Taiwan as a citizen of the Republic of China in 1994. He is best known for his 2003 book about his service in the Republic of China Army, Counting Mantou.

== Early life ==
Locke grew up in Texas, Colorado, and Florida before moving to Virginia to attend Washington and Lee University. He started getting seriously interested in photography at the age of 15, when he received a Pentax K1000 single-lens reflex camera for his birthday. He first went to Taiwan in 1988 to attend the Chinese-as-a-second-language program at Tunghai University in Taichung. He quickly decided after his arrival that he wanted to settle on the island, and after a brief trip back to the United States to graduate from Washington and Lee in 1991, he returned to Taiwan, this time to the Hsinchu family home of Lin Yi-ping, a good friend of his from Tunghai University.

== Naturalization ==
Lin Yi-ping's family eventually adopted Locke, and in 1994 Locke went through the process of becoming a naturalized citizen in Taiwan. The procedure went quite slowly due to bureaucratic confusion over the unusualness of his situation; most applicants for naturalisation were the spouses of citizens. Furthermore, the Nationality Law of the Republic of China requires applicants for naturalization to renounce all of their previous citizenships, but at the time the American Institute in Taiwan did not process renunciation applications.

As a result, to complete his naturalization Locke was forced to travel to Hong Kong to attend to U.S. citizenship renunciation procedures at the U.S. consulate there. He spent six months in the city as a stateless person, staying as a guest at the home of an employee of the Chung Hwa Travel Service — Taiwan's quasi-official representative organisation in Hong Kong — while the U.S. government processed his renunciation and the Taiwanese government formalised his naturalization. His Certificate of Loss of Nationality of the United States was issued on 12 September 1994. Some time later, the Taiwanese government finally issued him a travel document to enable him to return to Taiwan and to the home of his adoptive family, with his new name: Lin Dao-ming.

== Army service ==
Taiwan imposes conscription on all qualified males of military age, including naturalized citizens. Friends of the former Locke — now Lin — did not expect he would be called up, since he was of foreign origin, but his draft notice indeed arrived in late 1995. His military service coincided with a tense time for Taiwan, as the Third Taiwan Strait Crisis unfolded in early 1996.

Like most young men in Taiwan, Lin was not looking forward to military service, but he found to his surprise that it was the environment where he was "most accepted as a regular member of the community". In a later interview he would remember his military service as "the most important part of my life". As he described it, for the first few days his fellow recruits barely paid attention to the fact that he was of foreign origin, and the shared hardship of harsh conditions and verbal abuse from drill instructors quickly helped to build bonds between him and his colleagues.

Not being a native speaker of Chinese, Lin sometimes reacted more slowly than his fellow soldiers. Other than that, however, he describes his experiences as being quite similar to the generations of draftees before him. After boot camp, he was assigned to a unit based in Miaoli County. Like other fresh boot camp graduates, he experienced some hazing from more senior soldiers. He served on guard duty at the base's entrance, checking identity cards and on one occasion coming into contact with a superior officer surprised to see a non-Han Chinese man serving in the army. He was later promoted to corporal, and took on lighter duties at the brigade headquarters. He was honorably discharged from the army in early 1998.

== Post-discharge life ==
After returning to civilian life, Lin lived another stint in his former country, the United States, as an international student, attending further studies at the New York Film Academy beginning in 1999. He went on to begin producing short films in 2003. He worked as a cameraman for TVBS and Era Television, and as a production assistant for director Edward Yang. His photography later became well known in Taiwan and abroad after he co-founded the international photography collective Burn My Eye. In 2003 he directed the short film Clay Soldiers, which was screened at the Urban Nomads Film Festival the following year, winning an award for best film. He also joined The Muddy Basin Ramblers, a jug band, in 2004, playing trumpet, euphonium, washtub bass and the sousaphone.

Lin's feature film debut came with the premiere of the action/spy thriller "The Kiss of Lady X" at the Urban Nomad Film Festival on 10 May 2014.

Lin began writing Counting Mantou, his Chinese-language book about his army service, in the early 2000s. It was published in 2003. He later wrote an English-language work covering similar themes, Barbarian at the Gate, which was published in 2014. In addition to leading Burn My Eye workshops in various places around the world, he has been teaching a course on Street Photography at Zhongzheng Community College in Taipei since 2015. He is also currently an assistant professor at Shih-Hsin University in Taipei, where he teaches photography.

== Works ==
- 《台灣饅頭美國兵》. Taipei: Locus Publishing, 2003. ISBN 9789867975867. OCLC 816420590.
- Barbarian at the Gate: From the American Suburbs to the Taiwanese Army. Camphor Press, 2014. ASIN B00K5ASP1Q

== See also ==
- Taiwanese art
