= Formosa Medicine Show =

Studio album by The Muddy Basin Ramblers
- Released: 2013
- Producer: David Chen

The Muddy Basin Ramblers chronology
David Chen and The Muddy Basin Ramblers (2007)	Formosa Medicine Show (2013)	The Dance Age (2016)

Formosa Medicine Show is the second album released by The Muddy Basin Ramblers. It was nominated for the 57th Annual Grammy Awards in the Best Recording Package category.

The album was designed by David Chen, and Andrew Wong of Onion Design Associates.

== Track listing ==
No.	Title	Length
1.	"Medicine Show Song"	2:57
2.	"Betel Nut Road"	3:07
3.	"China Doll"	4:38
4.	"Banana-Nap"	3:56
5.	"Mysterioso"	3:17
6.	"Honey Babe (Ballad of a Con-Woman)"	3:02
7.	"Running Wild"	2:58
8.	"New Sweet Potato Blues"	2:43
9.	"Free China"	2:40
10.	"Storm Calling"	1:10
11.	"Typhoon Sue"	2:53
12.	"Coolie's Song (Sons of the South China Sea)"	3:00
13.	"As You Lay Me Down To Sleep"	3:56
14.	"Okinawa Mama"	4:55
15.	"Prelude: Island Love Song #3"	1:12
16.	"Island Love Song #3 (I'm in Love with a Betel Nut Girl)"	2:59
17.	"Joshua Fit De Battle of Jericho"	5:03
18.	"Juanita"	4:10
19.	"Prelude: Wang Chun Feng"	1:27
20.	"Wang Chun Feng (望春風)"	3:36
21.	"Jug Band Millionaire"	3:52
22.	"Tanglefoot"	1:50
23.	"Green River"	7:43

== Awards ==
Year	Award	Category	Nominee(s)	Result	Ref.
2014	57th Annual Grammy Awards	Best Recording Package	Formosa Medicine Show - The Muddy Basin Ramblers	Nominated	
2014	Golden Pin Design Award	Best Design	Formosa Medicine Show - The Muddy Basin Ramblers	Won	
