= The Muddy Basin Ramblers =

Jug band based in Taiwan

- The Muddy Basin Ramblers performing at National Taiwan Concert Hall Summer Jazz Outdoor Party in 2017

Background information
- Origin: Taipei, Taiwan
- Genres: blues; jug band; roots rock
- Years active: 2002–present
- Members: David Chen; Kai Chieh Chung; TC Lin; Tim "Thumper" Hogan; Andrew Hörwitz; Conor "Redman" Prunty; Will "Slim" Thelin
- Past members: Marie-Josée Laviolette; Eddie Lin; Zoë Moffat; Sandy "Sandman" Murray; Cristina Paradise; Zach Paradise; Dana Wylie

The Muddy Basin Ramblers are a jug band formed in 2002 by a group of American and British immigrants in Taipei, Taiwan. Their music is heavily influenced by 1920s and 1930s blues, jazz, and traditional string bands. Many of their songs are also inspired by traditional Taiwanese folk music and their experiences within Taiwanese culture. The Ramblers got their start playing on the street, riverside, and practicing in bars after hours. The band performs predominantly in English, but also performs in Mandarin and Taiwanese. All members of the group are multi-instrumentalists, often switching instruments after each song during live performances. They incorporate many homemade instruments like washboard, washtub bass, and jug.

Their albums have received recognition from the Recording Academy for their unique and creative design. In 2015, 2020, and 2025 the albums Formosa Medicine Show, Hold that Tiger, and Jug Band Millionaire were nominated for the Grammy Awards in the Best Recording Package category.

The Ramblers perform predominantly in Taiwan, but have also played in Hong Kong and Japan.

In 2016 the band gave a TEDx talk on the importance of "jamming" and how the process led to the writing of their albums. In 2023, the band was the featured guest on the "Taipei Tonight Show" with Dennis Nieh.

In 2024, the band was featured in the Cinemaphonic Live Sessions at Yucheng Studios. They performed with special guest members of 88 Balaz. Select songs from the performance were released as the EP The Muddy Basin Ramblers Cinemaphonic Sessions (Live) in 2025.

== Members ==
David Chen (Resonator Guitar, Guitar, Banjo, Lead Vocals, Banjolin, Lap steel guitar, Ukulele, Tenor Banjo)
Tim Hogan (Washboard, Drums, Vocals)
TC Lin (Trumpet, Baritone, Tuba, Washtub Bass, Sousaphone, Vocals)
Cristina Paradise (Fiddle, Piccolo, Suona, Ukulele, Mandolin, Washtub Bass, Vocals)
Zach Paradise (Saxophone, Banjolele, Tenor Banjo, Nose Whistle, Recorder, Ukulele, Whistling, Jaw harp, Guitar, Washtub Bass, Kazoo, Vocals).
Conor Prunty (Harmonica, Washtub Bass, Mandolin, Guitar, Vocals)
Will Thelin (Lead Vocals, Jug, Trombone, Kazoo, Tap dance, Comb and paper)

== Discography ==
- David Chen and The Muddy Basin Ramblers (2007)
- Formosa Medicine Show(2013)
- The Dance Age (2016)
- Hold That Tiger (2018)
- Jug Band Millionaire (2024)
- The Muddy Basin Ramblers Cinemaphonic Sessions (Live) (2025)

== Awards ==
Year	Award	Category	Nominee(s)	Result	Ref.
2014	57th Annual Grammy Awards	Best Recording Package	Formosa Medicine Show - The Muddy Basin Ramblers	Nominated	
2014	Golden Pin Design Award	Best Design	Formosa Medicine Show - The Muddy Basin Ramblers	Won	
2020	62nd Annual Grammy Awards	Best Recording Package	Hold that Tiger - The Muddy Basin Ramblers	Nominated	
2020	Golden Melody Awards	Best Recording Package	Hold that Tiger - The Muddy Basin Ramblers	Won	
2020	Independent Music Awards	Best Blues Song	Dharma Train - The Muddy Basin Ramblers	Nominated	
2020	Independent Music Awards	Best Producer Roots/Country	David Chen - The Muddy Basin Ramblers	Nominated	
2024	67th Annual Grammy Awards	Best Recording Package	Jug Band Millionaire - The Muddy Basin Ramblers	Nominated	
2025	Golden Melody Awards	Best Recording Package	Jug Band Millionare - The Muddy Basin Ramblers	Nominated	
