= Eggs (Oh No Ono album) =

Studio album by Oh No Ono
- Released: 20 April 2009
- Genre: Psychedelic pop
- Length: 49:54
- Label: Morningside, Friendly Fire
- Producer: Oh No Ono

Oh No Ono chronology
Yes (2007)	Eggs (2009)

Singles from Eggs
- 1. "Internet Warrior" Released: 17 May 2010

Professional ratings
Review scores
Source	Rating
Drowned in Sound	7/10
Pitchfork	6.8/10
SPIN	8/10

Eggs is the second studio album by Danish psychedelic pop band Oh No Ono, released on 20 April 2009. The album made a brief appearance on the Denmark Top 40 charts, peaking at #25.

== Background ==
In 2008, pianist and keyboardist Kristian Olsen left the band and was replaced by Nicolai Koch, whom the band met in Copenhagen. After their previous album, Yes, the band compiled lists of musical ideas they wished to explore for their next album and experimented by combining the various parts.

== Writing ==
In an interview with The Quietus, Koch explained that the band approached writing songs for the album by having each member write a different part of each song, and then the band would assemble the parts together.

The eclectic influences for the album were drawn from throughout the recording process; the band has listed Kraftwerk, old-school hip hop, and Black Dice as direct inspirations.

== Recording ==
The album was recorded over nine months in four different locations across Europe. The bass and drums were recorded first, on a farm on the island of Møn, which allowed the band to record natural sounds to incorporate into their songs. The band would also take shifts sleeping and recording the album.

The band also traveled to Sweden to record strings, a church in Copenhagen to record organ, and then finally recorded in the Beelitz-Heilstätten hospital complex.

== Cover and artwork ==
The album was released initially in a completely white CD sleeve with an embossed 11 x 9 grid of zeroes, with the album and band name placed within the grid. Inside this sleeve was a jewel case with a black cover and a digitally-altered photograph of two faces and aquatic animals. The vinyl edition of the album, which was released on 8 February 2010 on Leaf would use the latter photograph for the cover.

The album's CD design was nominated for a Grammy Award for Best Recording Package in 2011.

== Reception ==
The album has received moderately positive reviews from music critics.

In a positive review for SPIN, Barry Walters called the album a mixture of sunshine pop, Syd Barrett, and Electric Light Orchestra, and ultimately writing, "[r]arely has whimsical weirdness been done with such finesse". Paul Stephens Gettings called the band "as ambitious in their pop hooks as they are in their sonic adventures" in a review for Drowned in Sound.

Brian Howe, a writer for Pitchfork, similarly praised the influence of psychedelic pop, as well as the varied timbres of the record, but critiqued the songwriting, stating "this isn't the kind of stuff you're going to walk around humming. It's too weirdly shaped to really abide in you-- you have to be willing lose yourself in it instead".

== Track listing ==
All tracks are written by Oh No Ono.

No.	Title	Length
1.	"Eleanor Speaks"	4:51
2.	"Swim"	4:38
3.	"Internet Warrior"	4:06
4.	"Icicles"	3:28
5.	"Helplessly Young"	3:06
6.	"The Wave Ballet"	5:14
7.	"The Tea Party"	3:45
8.	"Miss Miss Moss"	4:19
9.	"Eve"	6:41
10.	"Beelitz"	9:46
Total length:		49:54

== Personnel ==
Oh No Ono

- Malthe Fischer – vocals, guitar
- Aske Zidore – guitars, vocals
- Nicolai Koch – keyboards
- Kristoffer Rom – drums
- Nis Svoldgård – bass, vocals

== Charts ==
Year	Chart	Position
2009	Denmark Albums Top 40	25
