= I'll Change for You =

Single by Mitski

from the album Nothing's About to Happen to Me
- Released: February 3, 2026
- Genre: Bossa nova; jazz
- Length: 3:16
- Label: Dead Oceans
- Songwriter: Mitski Miyawaki
- Producer: Patrick Hyland

Mitski singles chronology
"Where's My Phone?" (2026)	"I'll Change for You" (2026)	"If I Leave" (2026)

"I'll Change for You" is a song by American singer-songwriter Mitski. It was released on February 3, 2026, as the second single from her eighth studio album Nothing's About to Happen to Me. Like the rest of the album, it was written by Mitski and produced by Patrick Hyland.

== Overview ==
Musically, "I'll Change for You" has been variously described as bossa nova and jazz. Billboard Philippines stated the song "juxtaposes a feel-good bossa nova-reminiscent beat with heart-wrenching lyrics that yearn for a loved one's affections to return after being left hanging." Consequence felt the song sees Mitski "at her most vulnerable, offering to erase any part of herself that her partner might not want in exchange for their love." The publication noted the song's sparse arrangement, highlighting its "jazzy flourishes" and drummer Bruno Esrubilsky's "tightly-wound bossa nova groove".

A music video created for the song, directed by Lexie Alley, was described by The Line of Best Fit as "building upon the Tansy House (Note: A recurring thematic location in the promotion of Nothing's About to Happen to Me) world of a reclusive woman in her messy home, where she is ultimately free."
