= Hold That Tiger (The Muddy Basin Ramblers album) =

Studio album by The Muddy Basin Ramblers
- Released: 2018
- Producer: David Chen

The Muddy Basin Ramblers chronology
The Dance Age (2016)	Hold That Tiger (2018)	Jug Band Millionaire (2024)

Hold That Tiger is the fourth album released by The Muddy Basin Ramblers. The album was nominated for the 62nd Annual Grammy Awards in the Best Recording Package category.

The album was designed by Onion Design Associates based in Taiwan by art directors Andrew Wong and Fongming Yang. The visual style of the album incorporates Taiwan’s religious folk culture, Taoist mysticism, and 50’s retro-futurism. The CD sleeve itself is modeled after a Taoist Fu talisman.

== Track listing ==
No.	Title	Length
1.	"Prelude (It's a Tiger!)"	0:54
2.	"Tiger Rag"	3:40
3.	"Zen Beat Rag"	3:11
4.	"Speed of Light"	5:00
5.	"Telegraph"	3:31
6.	"Fear Not the Ocean"	3:43
7.	"Tower of Babble"	3:29
8.	"Mosquito Bop"	4:18
9.	"Immigrant Song (Ballad of Carlos Bulosan)"	3:47
10.	"Dharma Train"	4:16
11.	"Ke Bu Ke Yi Wen Ni Yi Ge Wen Ti?"	3:14
12.	"Shake it by the Betel Nut Tree (Betel Nut Calypso, feat. Fish Lin)"	4:02
13.	"Corrina"	4:39
14.	"Delia Green"	2:25
15.	"Interlude (I've Been Down So Long Down Don't Worry Me)"	0:46
16.	"A Rambler's Blues"	3:46
17.	"Interlude (Station Identification)"	0:14
18.	"Beer Drinking Woman and a UFO"	3:51
19.	"Island Love Song #1 (Nakashi Blues)"	3:04
20.	"Temple Blues"	7:07
21.	"Interlude (Let Summer Sing)"	0:34
22.	"Quantum Reel"	2:54

== Awards ==
Year	Award	Category	Nominee(s)	Result	Ref.
2020	62nd Annual Grammy Awards	Best Recording Package	Hold that Tiger - The Muddy Basin Ramblers	Nominated	
2020	Golden Melody Awards	Best Recording Package	Hold that Tiger - The Muddy Basin Ramblers	Won	
2020	Independent Music Awards	Best Blues Song	Dharma Train - The Muddy Basin Ramblers	Nominated	
2020	Independent Music Awards	Best Producer Roots/Country	David Chen - The Muddy Basin Ramblers	Nominated	
