= The Besides EP =

EP by J.Viewz
- Released: March 20, 2008
- Length: 28:42
- Producer: Jonathan Dagan

J.Viewz chronology
Muse Breaks (2005)	The Besides EP (2008)	Rivers and Homes (2011)

The Besides EP is an EP by J.Viewz, released on March 20, 2008.

== Track listing ==
1. "Smooth Criminal" - 3:53
2. "Yasmin Levy – "Naci en Alamo" (J.Viewz remix) - 3:34
3. "Nina Simone – "See Line Woman" (J.Viewz remix) - 4:24
4. "Move Change" - 4:37
5. "When Silent It Speaks" (featuring Glen Velez) - 5:40
6. "Under the Sun" (live version) - 6:34
