= Mike Brown (producer) =

American songwriter (born 1980)

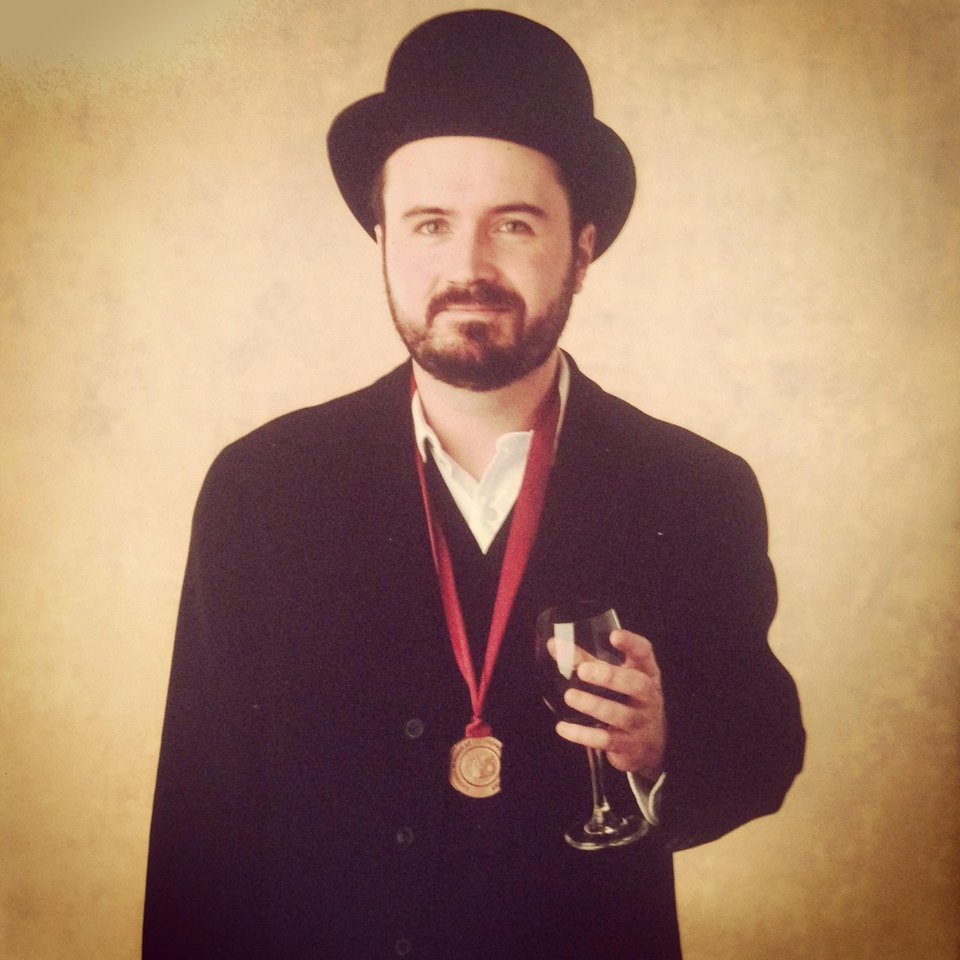
- Mike Brown at 2014 Grammy Awards

Background information
- Born: October 20, 1980 (age 45)
- Genres: Americana
- Occupations: Producer, engineer, mixer, songwriter, multi-instrumentalist
- Instruments: Guitar, vocals, lap steel guitar, fiddle, banjo, mandolin, keys, percussion, drums
- Years active: 1997–present

Mike Brown (born October 20, 1980) is an American Grammy-nominated producer, engineer, songwriter, multi-instrumentalist and founder of Temperamental Recordings.

Brown, along with childhood friend, Zac DeCamp, formed the group Geneseo, whose record Automatic Music Can Be Fun was Grammy-nominated in 2014 for Best Recording Package. His debut record, American Hotel, was self-recorded in all 50 American states and features 75 guest musicians spanning the last 60 years of recorded music. In 2009 Brown bought and renovated an 1828 country church into a recording studio named Temperamental Recordings and has produced and/or recorded music with artists including Augustines, Lowlight, Thieving Irons, Son of the Sun, David Knopfler, Tom VandenAvond, Chase Pagan, Caitlin Cary, and Hinkley. He is currently working on a new record featuring members of Sparklehorse, The National, Band of Horses, Larry and His Flask, Eels and others. Brown is also a musical instrument appraiser recognized on the History Channel show American Pickers.

== Selected discography ==
Artist	Year	Album	Producer	Engineer	Mixing	Musician	Writer
Geneseo	2013	Automatic Music Can Be Fun	check	check	check	check	check
Tom VandenAvond	2013	Wreck of a Fine Man	check	check	check	check	
Mike Brown	2011	American Hotel	check	check	check	check	check
Son of the Sun	2010	The Happy Loss	check	check		check	
Thieving Irons	2010	This Midnight Hum	check	check		check	
Lowlight	2009	"A Wonderful Lie"	check	check	check	check	check

== Temperamental Recordings ==
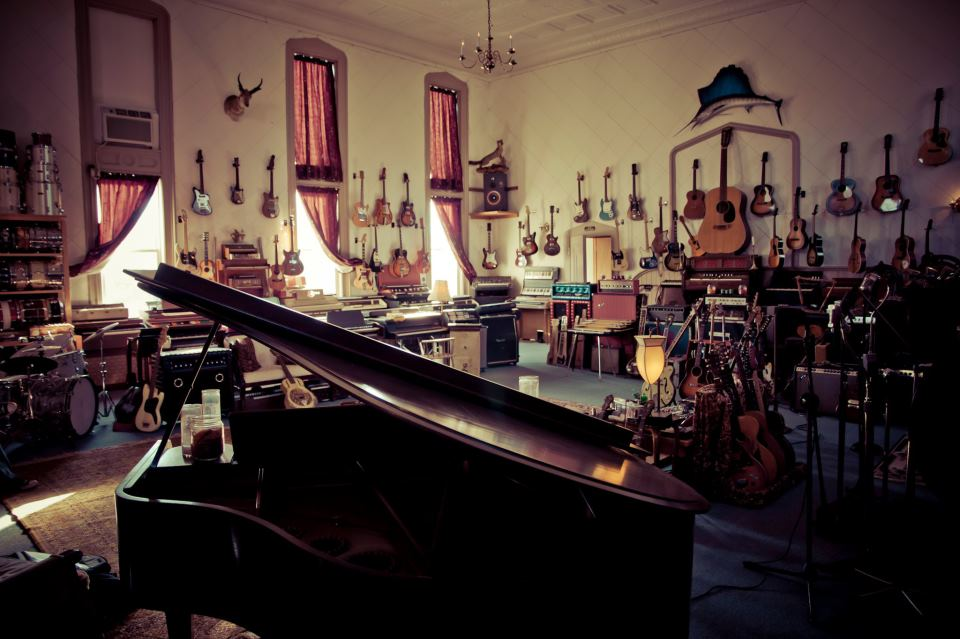
Temperamental Recordings

Temperamental Recordings has been a mobile studio, having a total of 5 spaces since 2002. It is currently housed in a former Methodist church in Geneseo that was built in 1828. The space has an impressive number of instruments that Brown collected from all 50 states, and houses recording equipment that spans the entire history of recording. The instruments that are in the studio all come with a story attached, they are gifts from past teachers, friends, and people that have recorded with Brown. In 2011 the studio was featured on American Pickers on the History Channel.

== Geneseo ==
Geneseo is a band composed of Mike Brown and his childhood friend Zac Decamp. Their album Automatic Music Can Be Fun was nominated for Best Recording Package at the 2014 Grammy Awards. The album was recorded while Decamp was living in Montreal and Brown was traveling recording American Hotel. While they were both home the two recorded the album. The recording took roughly a month and was completed at Brown's studio while Decamp was away in Canada. The album caught the attention of Brian Grunert, who owns White Bicycle Design Firm and has done the artwork for several musicians including Ani DiFranco. Grunert (6 time Grammy nominee), who was working on the design for American Hotel at the time, was given half finished tracks for Automatic Music Can Be Fun, which at the time was not meant to be released. Grunert and his design partner Annie Stoll found a hidden theme and poem in the lyrics for the album, which led to the inspiration for the scratch off packaging. The packaging was the first of its kind, hiding the lyrics behind silver scratch off material only leaving a series of words exposed. Those words make up a poem which led to a hidden track which is downloadable online. The album was released on September 24, 2013, with only 1,000 copies pressed.

== American Hotel ==
The inception for Brown's premiere solo record, American Hotel, was in September 2002 while he was in Richmond, Virginia, recording tracks at Sound of Music Recording Studios. While recording with producer David Lowery, Brown jokingly brainstormed a list of 150 possible guests to appear on the record. After heading back to his residence in Boston, Brown decided to make the wish list a reality and spent the next 8 years on the road recording various tracks. The finished product is a 22 track album recorded all 50 American states with 75 contributing artists. The record was a "sleeper record," says Brown, as it was only released for online download and never released in physical form.

Guests on American Hotel :

- Artis The Spoonman (Frank Zappa, Soundgarden)
- Andy Creeggan (Barenaked Ladies, Brothers Creeggan)
- Artimus Pyle (Lynyrd Skynyrd)
- Alan Weatherhead (Hotel Lights, Sparklehorse)
- Avalon Peacock (Mechanical Bull)
- Bill "Smitty" Smith (Truth and Salvage Company)
- Blair Sinta (Alanis Morissette)
- Brian Rosenworcel (Guster)
- Bruce Milner (Every Mother's Son)
- Caitlin Cary (Whiskeytown)
- Chasen Hampton (Chasen Hampton)
- Chase Pierson (Mechanical Bull)
- Chris Trapper (The Push Stars)
- Chris Zaloom (Chris Zaloom)
- Chris Vrenna (Nine Inch Nails, Marilyn Manson, Tweaker)
- Curt Kirkwood (Meat Puppets)
- Dana Colley (Morphine)
- Dave Brockie (Gwar)
- Dave Pirner (Soul Asylum)
- David Immergluck (Counting Crows)
- David Lowery (Cracker, Camper Van Beethoven)
- David Matheson (Moxy Früvous)
- Dave Savage (Dave Savage)
- Derek Asuan-O'Brien (Roses Pawnshop)
- Don Coffey (Superdrag)
- Eamon Ryland (The New Left)
- Eddie Kramer (Jimi Hendrix, Led Zeppelin)
- Elaine Summers (Elaine Summers)
- Eyvind Kang (Bill Frisell, Mike Patton)
- Freedy Johnston (Freedy Johnston)
- Gary Burke (Bob Dylan)
- Garth Hudson (The Band)
- Hershel Yatovitz (Chris Isaak)
- Isobel Campbell (Belle and Sebastian)
- Jay Bennett (Wilco)
- Jeff Foskett (Brian Wilson)
- Jen Gunderman (The Jayhawks)
- Jerry Augustyniak (10,000 Maniacs)
- Jerry Marotta (Peter Gabriel)
- Jim & Dani Lacey-Baker (Walkie Talkie)
- Jimmy Goodman (A Viberatto)
- John Davis (Superdrag)
- John Morand (Sound Of Music)
- John Regan (Peter Frampton)
- Joie Calio (Da Da)
- Josef Pelletier (Fantom Frequency)
- Kay Hanley (Letters To Cleo)
- Kyle Cook (Matchbox Twenty)
- Lew (The Sneakies)
- Marc Dauer (Jukebox Junkies, Five Easy Pieces)
- Mark Smidt (Denim Family Band)
- Matt Chamberlain (Tori Amos, David Bowie)
- Matt Rafal (The Brightwings)
- Miguel Urbiztondo (Maki, Sparklehorse)
- Mike Brown (The Sneakies)
- Peter Distefano (Porno For Pyros)
- Pete Droge (The Thorns)
- Rami Jaffee (The Wallflowers, Foo Fighters)
- Rebecca Schroeder (Rebecca Schroeder)
- Richard Lloyd (Television, Matthew Sweet)
- Robby Takac (Goo Goo Dolls)
- Rob Brill (Pete Droge and The Sinners)
- Scott McCaughey (Minus 5, R.E.M.)
- Sean Hurley (Vertical Horizon)
- Sebastian Steinberg (Soul Coughing)
- Sebastian St. John (Roses Pawn Shop)
- Shilah Morrow (Sin City)
- Soda (Soda and His Million Piece Band, Wax)
- Steve Berlin (Los Lobos)
- Stu Schulman (Willie Nelson)
- Tim Easton (Tim Easton)
- Tim Jones (Old Pike, Truth and Salvage Company)
- Tony Lucca (Tony Lucca)
- Tony Lunn (Tony Lunn)
- Zac Decamp (Geneseo)
