= Now You Know Oh No Ono =

EP by Oh No Ono
- Released: February 15, 2005
- Recorded: November & December 2004
- Label: Morningside, Tambourhinoceros
- Producer: Oh No Ono

Oh No Ono chronology
Now You Know Oh No Ono (2005)	Yes (2006)

Now You Know Oh No Ono is the debut EP of Danish band Oh No Ono, released in February 2005, on Morningside Records. It was recorded in November and December 2004.

== Track listing ==
1. "Hurrah Hurrah"
2. "Fat Simon Says"
3. "Ba Ba BaBa Ba Ba Well Anyway"
4. "The Fool"
5. "Am I Right?"
6. "Always The Same"
