= Muse Breaks =

Studio album by J.Viewz
- Released: March 2005
- Genre: Electronic
- Label: Deeplay Music
- Producer: Jonathan Dagan

J.Viewz chronology
Muse Breaks (2005)	The Besides EP (2008)

Muse Breaks is the debut album by J.Viewz. It was released on the Swedish label Deeplay Music, in April 2005. Just before its release, the trance duo Infected Mushroom released a remix of "Muse Breaks" on their album IM the Supervisor. This album sold close to 90,000 copies and made the remix a dancefloor hit.

== Track listing ==
1. "Under the Sun"
2. "Muse Breaks"
3. "Worth Light"
4. "When Silent It Speaks"
5. "Your Country"
6. "Room for Me, Room for Sweets"
7. "Meantime"
8. "Sunswoop"
9. "Feeler"
10. "Two Steps Away"
11. "Protected"
