= Loner (Caroline Rose album) =

Studio album by Caroline Rose
- Released: February 23, 2018
- Genres: Indie rock; indie pop; surf punk
- Length: 34:56
- Label: New West Records
- Producer: Paul Butler

Caroline Rose chronology
| I Will Not Be Afraid (2014) | Loner (2018) | Superstar (2020) |

Singles from Loner
- 1. "Money" Released: December 6, 2017; 2. "Soul No. 5" Released: January 11, 2018; 3. "Getting To Me" Released: January 31, 2018

Loner is the third studio album by American singer-songwriter Caroline Rose. Recorded at Panoramic Studios in Bolinas, California, it was released on February 23, 2018 by New West Records. Upon its release, the album drew universal acclaim from music critics.

== Background ==
Rose first gained prominence in 2013 and 2014, when she released her first two albums: America Religious and I Will Not Be Afraid. Both records were acoustic and classified as Americana, discussing topics including farmers’ unhappiness; she had written most of the songs in 2012, when she travelled across America in her van. Rose, however, ultimately concluded that she’d "outgrown" Americana, in large part because it lacked diversity, and as a queer woman, she "didn’t feel fully OK discussing [her] sexuality."

== Writing and recording ==
Rose wrote and recorded Loner over the span of nearly three years. She stated that her goal in writing and recording the album was not to create a cohesive record, but instead "bridge together all of these different types of songs that were all me." She commented that, in writing 2014’s I Will Not Be Afraid, she had been influenced by external pressure, so in writing Loner, she attempted to insulate herself from outside influence, instead writing and arranging the album herself, with help from Paul Butler, who co-produced and engineered the record.

== Composition ==
The album was noted for Rose’s departure from her acoustic Americana roots, particularly its use of bass synthesizers and drum programming. Her songwriting, which multiple critics described as "catchy," was compared to that of Carole King. However, Abbie Covington, writing for the Nation, argued that although the music’s style was a significant departure, many of Rose’s lyrical themes remained true to Americana, concluding that Rose "may have discarded the Americana label, but Caroline Rose isn’t done with America." Regarding her stylistic inspirations, Rose stated that she was "as much inspired by Justin Timberlake and Britney Spears as it was late '70s punk."

"Jeannie Becomes a Mom" was classified as synth-pop and noted for its catchiness. The song follows a woman in the suburbs of Topeka, Kansas. Rose told Consequence of Sound that she had been inspired to write the song following a friend’s accidental pregnancy; she also called it her favorite song on the album. In a press release upon the premiere of the song’s music video, she described the song as her "first foray into making really fun, sort of weird pop music," and noted that she composed it on an OP-1 synthesizer.

"Getting to Me" profiles a waitress. "Money," a Rockabilly and surf-rock song, discusses greed; in the song, Rose argues that money is a more corrupting influence than "religion, the law, even love." "Talk" has been classified as psych-rock. "Smile! AKA Schizodrift Jam 1 AKA Bikini Intro" is a forty-nine second interlude which introduces "Bikini;" in it, men’s voices encourage Rose to smile. "Bikini" was described in the Nation as sounding like "The Beach Boys if Pete Townshend replaced Brian Wilson at the helm."

== Release ==
The album was released on February 23, 2018, by New West Records.

=== Singles ===
Prior to the record’s release, Rose released "Money" with an accompanying music video, which she premiered on Noisey.

Rose released a music video for "Jeannie Becomes a Mom" on October 17, 2018. The video, which was directed by Amanda Speva, features Abby Pierce as the titular character, depicting Jeannie moving into a new home, performing a dance routine with the movers, and preparing a rainbow Jell-O cake. The song was ranked the fifteenth-best single of the year by National Public Radio.

== Critical reception ==
Professional ratings
Aggregate scores
| Source | Rating |
|---|---|
| Metacritic | 83/100 |
Review scores
| Source | Rating |
| Allmusic | 4/5 stars |
| MusicOMH | 4.5/5 stars |
| Loud and Quiet | 8/10 |
| Paste | 7.9/10 |
| Pitchfork | 7.6/10 |
| Punknews.org | 3.5/5 stars |
| Sputnikmusic | 4/5 |
| Under the Radar | 8.5/10 stars |

Upon its release, Loner drew universal acclaim from music critics, earning a score of 83 out of 100 on review aggregate site Metacritic.

=== Accolades ===
Loner featured on several publications' lists of the best albums of 2018, ranking on such lists by ABC News (ninth), musicOMH (twelfth), American Songwriter (18th), Rough Trade (25th), Under the Radar (27th), Loud and Quiet (30th), Paste (43rd), and Bandcamp Daily (85th).

== Track listing ==
All songs written by Caroline Rose.

1. "More of the Same" — 4:08
2. "Cry!" — 3:43
3. "Money" — 2:15
4. "Jeannie Becomes a Mom" — 4:21
5. "Getting to Me" — 3:33
6. "To Die Today" — 3:41
7. "Soul No. 5" — 3:09
8. "Smile! AKA Schizodrift Jam 1 AKA Bikini Intro" — 0:49
9. "Bikini" — 2:29
10. "Talk" — 3:30
11. "Animal" — 3:18
