= 11th Dimension (song) =

2009 single by Julian Casablancas

Single by Julian Casablancas

from the album Phrazes for the Young
- Released: October 2, 2009
- Genre: New wave; synth-pop
- Length: 4:03
- Label: Cult via Rough Trade (UK); Cult via RCA (US & Europe)
- Songwriter: J. Casablancas
- Producer: Jason Lader

Julian Casablancas singles chronology
"11th Dimension" (2009)	"I Wish It Was Christmas Today" (2009)

7" Record Store Day Limited Edition cover

"11th Dimension" is a song by Julian Casablancas and is the lead single from his debut album Phrazes for the Young. It was first performed live on the talk show The Tonight Show with Conan O'Brien on October 27, 2009. Pitchfork Media awarded the track as "Best New Track" and rated "11th Dimension" the 66th best song of 2009, calling it "the strongest [Julian's] sounded since Room on Fire. It's a blast of retro-futuristic synths, steam-rolling guitar licks, and slicing, dicing hi-hat, and the busy pulse of the production cuts through the detachment and manages to convey a sense of fun, as if he's finally enjoying the creative experience".

== Music video ==
The music video for "11th Dimension" premiered on Babelgum on December 23, 2009. The video was directed by longtime Strokes collaborator Warren Fu, and was loosely inspired by Bruce Lee's Game of Death. The video features Danielle Haim (the lead singer of Haim) as the drummer in the background of the video.

== Track listing ==
Digital download
No.	Title	Length
1.	"11th Dimension"	4:03

7" Record Store Day Limited Edition
No.	Title	Length
1.	"11th Dimension (Live from Electric Lady Studios for WRXP, New York)"	5:15
2.	"Long Island Blues"	5:40

== Personnel ==
Studio version

- Julian Casablancas - vocals, all instruments, songwriting
- Jason Lader - all instruments, production
- Blake Mills - guitar
- Lenny Castro - shaker

Live performances

- Julian Casablancas - vocals
- JP Bowersock - guitar
- Alex Carapetis - drums
- Danielle Haim - percussion, backing vocals
- Jeff Kite - keyboards
- Nelson London - keyboards, guitar
- Blake Mills - guitar

== Charts ==
Chart (2009–2010)	Peak position
Belgium (Ultratip Bubbling Under Flanders)	13
Belgium (Ultratip Bubbling Under Wallonia)	25
Denmark Airplay (Tracklisten)	13
Japan (Japan Hot 100)	48
UK Indie (OCC)	22
US Hot Singles Sales (Billboard)	25
