= Superstar (Caroline Rose album) =

Studio album by Caroline Rose
- Released: March 6, 2020
- Genres: Synth-pop; dance-pop; disco
- Length: 37:58
- Label: New West
- Producer: Caroline Rose

Caroline Rose chronology
| Loner (2018) | Superstar (2020) | The Art of Forgetting (2023) |

Singles from Superstar
- 1. "Feel the Way I Want" Released: January 7, 2020; 2. "Freak Like Me" Released: February 11, 2019; 3. "Do You Think We’ll Last Forever?" Released: March 3, 2019

Professional ratings
Aggregate scores
| Source | Rating |
|---|---|
| Metacritic | 81/100 |
Review scores
| Source | Rating |
| AllMusic | 4.5/5 stars |
| The Austin Chronicle | 3.5/5 stars |
| DIY | 2/5 stars |
| Exclaim! | 9/10 |
| MusicOMH | 3.5/5 stars |
| Paste | 8.9/10 |
| Pitchfork | 6.7/10 |
| Rolling Stone | 3.5/5 stars |
| Sputnikmusic | 3.5/5 stars |
| Under the Radar | 8/10 |

Superstar is the fourth studio album by American singer-songwriter Caroline Rose. It was released on March 6, 2020 under New West Records.

== Chart performance ==
Superstar opened at No. 20 on the US Heatseekers Albums chart with 3,000 units.

== Critical reception ==
Superstar received positive reviews from critics. At Metacritic, which assigns a weighted average rating out of 100 to reviews from mainstream publications, this release received an average score of 81, based on 14 reviews.

== Track listing ==
All tracks are written by Caroline Rose, except where noted.

Superstar track listing
| No. | Title | Length |
|---|---|---|
| 1. | "Nothing's Impossible" | 4:08 |
| 2. | "Got to Go My Own Way" | 3:21 |
| 3. | "Do You Think We'll Last Forever?" | 4:14 |
| 4. | "Feelings Are a Thing of the Past" | 1:03 |
| 5. | "Feel the Way I Want" | 4:03 |
| 6. | "Freak Like Me" (Caroline Rose and Aaron Embry) | 3:42 |
| 7. | "Someone New" | 3:08 |
| 8. | "Pipe Dreams" | 3:25 |
| 9. | "Command Z" | 1:22 |
| 10. | "Back at the Beginning" | 4:21 |
| 11. | "I Took a Ride" | 5:11 |
| Total length: | | 37:58 |

== Charts ==
Chart performance for Superstar
| Chart (2020) | Peak position |
|---|---|
| US Heatseekers Albums (Billboard) | 20 |
