= Jug Band Millionaire =

Studio album by the Muddy Basin Ramblers
- Released: 2024
- Studio: Yucheng Studios
- Producer: David Chen

The Muddy Basin Ramblers chronology
Hold That Tiger (2018)	Jug Band Millionaire (2024)	The Muddy Basin Ramblers Cinemaponic Sessions (Live) (2025)

Jug Band Millionaire is the fifth album released by the Muddy Basin Ramblers. The album was nominated for the 67th Annual Grammy Awards in the Best Recording Package category. The album is composed of fifteen tracks including jug band standards and originals. Also included with the physical album is a 33-page booklet with song notes, sheet music, and jug band history notes.

== Design ==
The album design was handled by Onion Design Associates based in Taiwan, led by art directors Andrew Wong and Julie Yeh.

The album is presented in a design inspired by vintage sheet music, a popular medium during the original jug band era, particularly in the wake of the rise of 78 rpm records.

The album packaging is designed to resemble an early 1920s "songbook" and includes a 33-page booklet with sheet music for selected songs, along with historical notes, commentary, and illustrations of the Jug Band musicians. The booklet serves as a "mini-encyclopedia" of early Jug Band music, featuring a dense layout with text, musical scores, and visual elements that replicate the look and feel of early 20th-century sheet music books.

The design incorporates fictional and real advertisements, including those for past albums, printing companies, beer, and musical instruments like the kazoo and washtub bass. The overall aesthetic embraces the imperfections of early printing techniques, with two-tone printing on the cover, irregular cuts, and textured, handmade typography, drawing on historical fonts from the 1900s to 1930s. The CD sleeve is modeled after 1920s Black Diamond-brand guitar string packaging and is letterpress-printed using a restored Heidelberg Platen Press machine, adding to the nostalgic feel.

The design reflects the maximalist approach of early 20th-century design, with abundant visual detail that mirrors the era’s style, capturing the essence of the music and the historical period that birthed Jug Band music.

== Track listing ==
No.	Title	Length
1.	"Washboard Cut Out"	2:57
2.	"Sun Brimmer's Blues"	3:32
3.	"Boodle Am Shake"	3:12
4.	"Deep Elem Blues"	3:44
5.	"Blue Guitar Stomp"	3:12
6.	"Lord, Got Tomatoes"	3:26
7.	"Banjoreno"	3:16
8.	"Rock Island Line"	2:07
9.	"Sparrow Blues (for Sleepy John)"	3:23
10.	"Jazz it Blues"	2:52
11.	"Breeze, Blow My Baby Back to Me"	2:55
12.	"Interlude (The Bluegrass Oligarchy)"	0:18
13.	"Jug Band Millionare '23"	3:51
14.	"Too Long"	3:23
15.	"Four Seasons of Red (feat. Lo Sirong)"	3:35

== Awards ==
Year	Award	Category	Nominee(s)	Result	Ref.
2025	67th Annual Grammy Awards	Best Recording Package	Jug Band Millionaire - The Muddy Basin Ramblers	Nominated	
2025	Golden Melody Awards	Best Recording Package	Jug Band Millionare - The Muddy Basin Ramblers	Nominated	
