= Rivers and Homes =

Studio album by J.Viewz
- Released: June 1, 2011
- Genre: Electronic
- Length: 47:02
- Label: Jorjia Music
- Producer: Jonathan Dagan

J.Viewz chronology
The Besides EP (2008)	Rivers and Homes (2011)

Rivers and Homes is the second full-length album by J.Viewz. It was released in 2011 on CD, digital download and USB flash drive form. The flash drive comes with both preceding releases too.

The album was nominated for a Grammy Award in 2011 in the Best Recording Package category.

== Track listing ==
1. "Rivers and Homes" – 2:45
2. "Salty Air" – 4:15
3. "Wht U Hv for the Sun" – 4:15
4. "Prelude" – 2:15
5. "Oh, Something's Quiet" – 4:08
6. "Meantime (Little Notes)" – 4:54
7. "This City Means No Love" – 3:40
8. "Building a Home" – 3:50
9. "Far Too Close" – 5:46
10. "Come Back Down" – 4:48
11. "About the Sea" – 6:21
