= J.Views =

Israeli musical artist

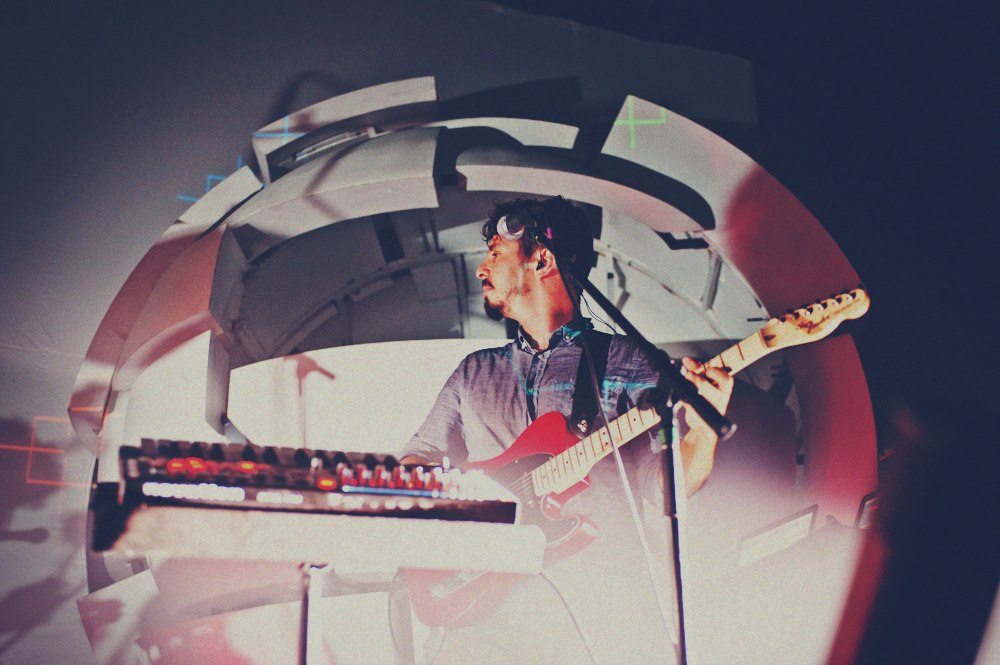
- J.Views live at Terminal 5 in New York City, August 11, 2012

Background information
- Also known as: J.Viewz
- Born: Jonathan Dagan; February 16, 1982 (age 44); Israel
- Website: www.jviewz.com

Jonathan Dagan (born February 16, 1982), known by his stage name J.Views, is a musician based in New York.

As a songwriter, producer, remixer, and art director, J.Views is known for pushing the boundaries in the creative world, constantly innovating the dialog with his audience.

Under the alias J.Views, he has collaborated with numerous guest vocalists and musicians. His production often incorporates nostalgic elements through the use of samples, analog tapes and synthesizers, and is often described as multilayered and detailed. NPR's All Songs Considered said, "J.Views writes songs that whirl and clatter like tiny Rube Goldberg devices."

In 2018, Dagan created the leading sample used in "Drip Too Hard" by American rappers Lil Baby and Gunna. The song was certified 5× platinum by the RIAA, and peaked at No. 4 on the US Billboard Hot 100. In February 2019, Nicki Minaj released her version of the song, titled "Barbie Drip". Another J.Views sample from the same Splice series was featured in the 2019 release "Levitate" by Australian musician Flume featuring Reo Cragun.

Among his international productions, Dagan produced the album Orot by the Israeli artist Avraham Tal. The album was certified platinum in Israel, and its leading single is the most played song of the decade on Israeli radio, according to the Israeli society of music publishers ACUM.

== Career ==
=== Early releases ===
Dagan worked on the first J.Views demo with vocalist Noa Lembersky in 2004. Soon after, tracks from that demo caught the attention of several record labels, and, in the following months, the first J.Views songs were released in over 50 compilations worldwide.

In April 2005, the debut album of J.Views, Muse Breaks, was released by Deeplay Music (Sweden).

=== rivers and homes ===
The second J.Views full-length album, rivers and homes, was released in 2011. It originated as an idea Dagan dubbed "Work In Progress." Dagan began developing it in the spring of 2010. The plan was to make an album available for pre-order, and then record and release tracks gradually over the course of a year to fans who subscribed to the process.

From early on, the project drew subscribers in, and allowed the album to be financed through pre-orders. Each song was recorded and released in the same period in which it had been conceived, giving fans an intimate real-time look at the artistic evolution of the album.

Right after the release of “Salty Air” - the 3rd track in the process - it was selected by Revlon to be used in its 2011 advertising campaign, starring Halle Berry.

Once completed, Dagan distributed the finished album in physical form to his subscribers, and only later made it available to the general public. In 2012, rivers and homes was nominated for a Grammy Award for Best Recording Package.

=== The DNA Project ===
In November 2014, Dagan launched The DNA Project, a website presenting the step-by-step making of the next J.Views album in real-time.

The concept was originally presented as a crowdfunding campaign on Kickstarter. Dagan had a vision to create a multi-layered player for his next album, allowing listeners to access the origins and creative processes behind every song. The campaign quickly raised $65,234 with the backing of over 1,000 fans, and with the help of digital agency, Hello Monday, the website was launched.

With the DNA Project, J.Views invites his fans to follow his creative process in its entirety, providing access to the people, places, and sounds that inspired each song, as well as exclusive videos of J.Views's writing process, recording sessions, and innermost thoughts during the creation of each song.

Since its launch, the DNA Project has generated buzz in digital and music communities, with over one million views. In June 2015, the DNA Project won the Cannes Silver Lion Award in the Design Category. Other awards include the Site of the Day Awards from FWA and Awwwards, as well as The Webby Awards Music Website Nominee and Awwwards & Internet Explorer Site of the Year Nominee.

The album was set to be completed in December 2015. Until then, fans were encouraged to interact with the DNA Project by commenting, adding sounds and images of their own, and downloading samples for use in their own music. The album was eventually released under the title 401 Days in 2016.

=== 401 Days ===
The third and latest album of J.Views, 401 Days was released independently in May 2016. The first video from the first single of 401 Days, #Almostforgot, is a mobile experience controlled by the viewer's heart rate in real time.

=== Other projects ===
In 2018 he was invited by Harman Kardon and Volvo to create three songs in three European cities with the Swedish music artist Ana Diaz. On their Amsterdam trip they met Yuri Landman who build an electric table string instrument in a few hours with Views.

== Live performance ==
J.Views performs with a changing live setup, and in 2017 the live band includes Denitia Odigie, Ofer Levy, and Tomer Rabinowitz. This live band also launched the album 401 Days along with a 30-Piece Orchestra at the Tel-Aviv Opera Hall, as an audio-visual experience.

== Awards and recognition ==
J.Views received two Grammy Award nominations. For his package design of his album rivers and homes and for his art direction, alongside designer Mathias Høst Normark, for his third album 401 Days. in 2012 and 2016 respectively. For the creation of DNA Project, J.Views teamed up with Danish creative agency Hello Monday. The website has received numerous awards and nominations including;

- Cannes Lions - Silver Lion winner
- Webby Awards - Music Website (Nominated)
- Awwwards - site of the month
- FWA Award
- French Design Index - site of the day
- D&AD Pencil Awards
- One Show Awards

== Discography ==
=== Albums ===
- Muse Breaks (2005)
- rivers and homes (2011)
- 401 Days (2016)
- 401.1 (2017)

=== EPs ===
- The Besides EP (2008)

=== Remixes ===
- Kings of Leon – Birthday (J.Views remix) (White Label)
- Depeche Mode – Peace (J.Views remix) (White Label)
- Nina Simone – See line Woman (J.Views remix) (2008, Rock River Music)
- Yasmin Levy – Naci en Alamo (J.Views remix) (2008, Adama Music)
- Infected Mushroom & Jonathan Davis – Smashing the Opponent (J.Views remix) (2009, Adrenaline Music)
- Easy Star All-Stars – On the Run (J.Views remix) (2010, Easy Star Records)
- Moby – The Day (J.Views remix) (2011, Mute Records)
- Walk the Moon - Tightrope (J.Views remix) (2012, RCA Records/Sony Music)
- Dido - No Freedom (J.Views remix) (2013, RCA Records/Sony Music)
- Wild cub - Wishing Well (J.Views remix) (2014)
- RKCB – Bloom (J.Views remix) (2017, AllPoints)
- Bluetech – “Prayers for Rain” (J.Views remix) (2020, Aleph Zero Records)
