= Jeff Gold =

American music executive

Jeff Gold (born 1956) is an American music business executive, author, music historian, Grammy Award winning art director, and music memorabilia collector and dealer.

== Music Business ==
Gold was the first employee of Rhino Records, and in 1975 produced the label's first release, "Go To Rhino Records" by Wild Man Fischer. In 1977 he signed former Thirteenth Floor Elevators' singer Roky Erickson to Rhino, overseeing his comeback single, "Bermuda/The Interpreter," and in 1981 signed Spirit to the label, supervising the release of their album The Adventures of Kaptain Kopter & Commander Cassidy in Potato Land.

In 1981 he joined A&M Records as assistant to president Gil Friesen; he was later promoted to vice president of marketing & creative services and worked with The Police, Cat Stevens, Iggy Pop and Bryan Adams. Gold wrote liner notes and helped compile albums by Cat Stevens, Captain Beefheart, and The Flying Burrito Brothers, and was editor of the book "A&M Records: The First 25 Years". Gold art directed album covers for numerous artists including The Neville Brothers, Al Green, and John Hiatt, and in 1991 won a best album package Grammy Award for the Suzanne Vega album Days of Open Hand.

In 1990 Gold joined Warner Bros. Records as senior vice president of creative services, working with artists including Seal, R.E.M., and the Red Hot Chili Peppers, and art directed album covers for artists including Prince, Miles Davis, Jimi Hendrix, Squeeze He received Best Album Cover Grammy nominations for his work on packages for R.E.M, ZZ Top, and Paul Westerberg. He was an executive producer of the albums Stone Free: A Tribute to Jimi Hendrix (featuring Eric Clapton, Jeff Beck, Seal, and The Cure) and the soundtrack to the Howard Stern movie Private Parts.

In 1991 Gold had the idea to include a Rock The Vote petition postcard supporting the Motor Voter Bill on the back of the longbox for R.E.M's Out of Time CD, resulting in thousands of postcards being delivered to the United States Senate, and lending critical support to the eventual passage of the National Voter Registration Act of 1993. The podcast 99% Invisible devoted an episode to the R.E.M longbox, noting "R.E.M.’s Out of Time is the most politically significant album in the history of the United States. Because of its packaging."

In 1993, Gold helped Warner Bros. Records establish the first online presence for a major record label, with dedicated Warner areas on AOL and CompuServe, and later the first website for a record company. Gold was instrumental in the Warner/Elektra/Atlantic labels decision to sell cd's without the much maligned longbox, leading to an industry-wide phase-out.

Gold was promoted to executive vice president/general manager of Warner Bros. Records in 1995, and left in 1998 in a management shakeup.

== Author ==
In 2012 Gold's book 101 Essential Rock Records: The Golden Age of Vinyl, From The Beatles to the Sex Pistols, was issued by Gingko Press; it was one of eight books selected by Rolling Stone as "The year's best reading material".

In 2016 Gold's book Total Chaos: The Story of The Stooges/As Told by Iggy Pop, was issued by Third Man Books, a division of Jack White's Third Man Records. It was chosen by Rough Trade as one of their ‘Books of the Year’, and earned rave reviews in Esquire, Mojo, Noisey, and many other publications.

Gold's book, Sittin' In: Jazz Clubs of the 1940's and 1950's, was issued in November 2020 by HarperCollins. Including interviews with Quincy Jones and Sonny Rollins, it was featured in the year-end wrap-ups of the best music books by The Wall Street Journal, The Daily Beast, The Atlanta Journal-Constitution, All Music Guide, and The Los Angeles Times, which called it "vivid and beautiful".

== Music Historian ==
Gold was profiled by Rolling Stone magazine as one of the five top collectors of music memorabilia and named by Billboard as a "leading expert on rare lp's". He was profiled in 2014 by the website Dust & Grooves.

Gold has served as a curatorial consultant to museum exhibitions including the Experience Music Project's Bob Dylan's American Journey: 1955-1966, and Beatlemania! He archived the papers of legendary music executive Mo Ostin for the Rock and Roll Hall of Fame; and those of A&M Records co-founders Herb Alpert and Jerry Moss for the University of California Los Angeles (U.C.L.A.) special collections library.

Gold was an appraiser on VH1's Rock Collectors.

Gold has worked on archival and reissue album projects for artists including Jimi Hendrix, the Grateful Dead, The Velvet Underground, The Stooges and Gram Parsons. His discovery of previously undocumented live and studio outtake tapes has led to major label releases, including the Bob Dylan album In Concert—Brandeis University 1963.

Gold has appeared in music documentary films including the 1975 David Bowie BBC documentary Cracked Actor, the 2004 Prince BBC documentary Prince's Millions, the 2016 R.E.M. NRK documentary History of the Hit Song, and the 2020 film Music, Money and Madness...Jimi Hendrix in Maui.

In 2013 Gold hosted a panel discussion and multimedia presentation on the vinyl record revival at the Grammy Museum in Los Angeles.

In 2019, Longreads ran an article about Gold titled How Jeff Gold Saved Rare Iggy Pop & The Stooges Recordings From the Dump.

Gold operates the music memorabilia website Recordmecca where he also blogs about topics of interest to collectors.

Gold is a well known Bob Dylan expert. In 2012 he appeared on PBS’ History Detectives (2012, Episode 1), authenticating previously unknown Bob Dylan handwritten manuscripts. His 2014 discovery of 149 previously unknown Bob Dylan acetate records received extensive media attention, including articles in The New York Times and The Wall Street Journal. In 2016, Gold and colleague Laura Woolley appraised The Bob Dylan Archive, now housed at the University of Tulsa.

== Non-profits ==
Gold is a major donor to the Rock and Roll Hall of Fame's library and archives, which houses The Jeff Gold Collection.

Gold formerly served as co-chairman of the youth voter registration organization Rock The Vote, which presented him (with his wife Jody Uttal) their Founder's Award in 1997.
