= Marc Burckhardt =

American fine artist and illustrator

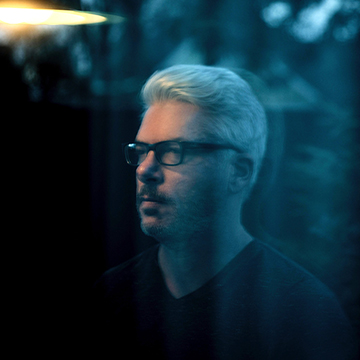
- Education: Baylor University, B.A. Art history, B.F.A. Printmaking; Art Center College of Design, B.F.A. Illustration
- Known for: Illustration, fine art
- Awards: Hamilton King Award, 2011; 7 Gold Medals, Society of Illustrators; 5 Silver Medals, Society of Illustrators
- Website: marcburckhardt.com

Marc Burckhardt is an American fine artist and illustrator. Burckhardt's work focuses on historical symbolism with contemporary themes. He uses a mix of both oil and acrylic paints in a modern variation of the Old Masters techniques of monochromatic underpainting and color glazing, often using wood panels. Burckhardt is additionally known for combining some paintings with pressed metal facades, historically known as rizas or oklads, forming elaborate patterns in the metal to create a jacket-like patterned covering

== Early life and education ==
Burckhardt was born in Germany to German-born Jochem and American-born Chris Christenson Burckhardt. He grew up in Waco, Texas, where his parents worked as university professors at Baylor University. His mother was a painter and visiting art museums was common for the family. Burckhardt credits this combination of the American South and German culture with planting deep roots both in folk art and the darker vision of Flemish painters.

Burckhardt attended Baylor University, receiving undergraduate degrees in art history and printmaking. In 2009, Burckhardt was named one of Baylor's 150 Most Notable Alumni, for exceptional achievement in his field. Burckhardt went on to receive a BFA from Art Center College of Design in Pasadena, graduating with honors in 1989.

=== Early influences ===
Burckhardt's early influences were the painters Albrecht Dürer, Lucas Cranach, and Diego Rivera, but also comic artists such as Robert Crumb and Gilbert Shelton. Burckhardt was additionally influenced by the writings of art historian Leo Steinberg, and his landmark work The Sexuality of Christ in Renaissance Art and in Modern Oblivion.

== Work ==
Burckhardt is quoted as saying that both his fine art work and his commissions are less influenced by any one artist and more with periods and genres such as Medieval religious icons, early American and English sporting paintings as well as Dutch secular genre painting, which he observes "served to aggrandize the subject rather than the artist".

=== Fine arts and gallery work ===
Burckhardt's work is in numerous private collections, including that of the estate of Johnny Cash, who commissioned Burckhardt to paint a portrait of his wife June Carter Cash for his home outside Nashville, Tennessee. Burckhardt's fine art works have been shown throughout the United States and internationally, at locations such as the Rock and Roll Hall of Fame, The Art Institute of Boston, Art Basel in Miami, Art Basel in Basel, Switzerland, SCOPE in New York, The Martin Museum of Art (Texas), Reial Cercle Artístic (Royal Artistic Circle) in Barcelona, Affenfaust Galerie (Hamburg), Mindy Solomon Gallery (Miami), Copro Gallery (Los Angeles), Bash Contemporary (San Francisco). In 2010, Burckhardt was named Texas State Artist by the Texas Legislature and the Texas Commission on the Arts.

Many of Burckhardt's gallery works are what he describes as "'possession-oriented portraiture' in which the animals, or ships, or people, aren't what they appear to be; they're placeholders for desires, fears, and ideals."

=== Illustration ===
Burckhardt's art has appeared on book covers, albums, storefronts, packaging & clothing, and been commissioned by clients that include Gucci, Rolling Stone, Atlantic Monthly, The New York Times, WIRED, Vanity Fair, Rock & Roll Hall of Fame, and TIME, among others. His album art includes work for Johnny Cash (The Legend:Johnny Cash; 2006 Grammy Award for Best Boxed or Special Limited Edition Package ), June Carter Cash (Wildwood Flower), John Hiatt (It'll Come to You), Charlie Haden (Rambling Boy), Julian Casablancas (Phrazes for the Young), and Mitski (Nothing's About to Happen to Me).

Burckhardt is recognized for his portraiture work, which has been commissioned by Major League Baseball, The Rock and Roll Hall of Fame, Sony Records, and others. His work has received numerous awards, including Gold & Silver medals from the New York Society of Illustrators, Cannes Lions, and the American Advertising Federation. He is a recipient of the prestigious Hamilton King Award from the American Museum of Illustration, and in 2019 Taschen named him one of the top 100 illustrators in the world.

== Awards and service ==
=== Awards ===
- 150 Most Notable Alumni, Baylor University (2009)
- Texas State Artist, Texas Commission on the Arts (2010)
- Hamilton King Award, Society of Illustrators (2011)
- Presidential Award of Excellence in Scholarly/Creative Activities, Texas State University (2012)
- Two-time Hunting Art Prize finalist
- Silver Medal, Institutional Category, Top Dog, (2004) Society of Illustrators (46th Annual)
- Gold Medal, Institutional Category, Twins, (2009) Society of Illustrators (51st Annual)
- Silver Medal, Editorial Category, Whitewash, (2010) Society of Illustrators (52nd Annual)
- Gold Medal, Uncommissioned Category, Himmelblick, (2011) Society of Illustrators (53rd Annual)
- Gold Medal, Editorial Category, Over Fishing, (2012) Society of Illustrators (54th Annual)
- Silver Medal, Institutional Category, Gilded, (2013) Society of Illustrators (55th Annual)
- Gold & Silver Medals, "Horsepower", Cannes Lions (2014)
- Gold Medal, Advertising Category, Settler Sports Illustrated, (2017) Society of Illustrators (59th Annual)
- Silver Medal, Surface & Product Category, Gucci Homecoming, (2020) Society of Illustrators (62nd Annual)
- Gold Medal, Surface & Product Category, Gucci Storefront, (2021) Society of Illustrators (63rd Annual)
- Gold Medal, Uncommissioned, The Crossing, (2023) Society of Illustrators (65th Annual)
- Gold Medal, Surface & Product (Series), Still Austin Bottled-in-Bond, (2024) Society of Illustrators (66th Annual)
- Silver Medal, Uncommissioned, Vanitas, (2026) Society of Illustrators (68th Annual)

=== Service ===
- President of the Illustration Conference
- Chair of the Society of Illustrators 47th Annual

== Personal life ==
Burckhardt divides his time between Austin, Texas and Bremen, Germany. He is a past instructor at School of Visual Arts in New York City and Texas State University, in San Marcos, Texas, and is a frequent guest lecturer at universities and arts organizations.

== See also ==
- List of Baylor University people
