= Phrazes for the Young =

Studio album by Julian Casablancas
- Released: November 2, 2009
- Recorded: 2009
- Studios: ARC (Omaha, Nebraska); F-Hole (New York City); Heart Shaped (Los Angeles)
- Genres: Alternative rock; synth-pop; alternative dance; new wave
- Length: 40:08
- Labels: Cult; RCA; Rough Trade
- Producers: Jason Lader; Mike Mogis

Julian Casablancas chronology
Phrazes for the Young (2009)	Live from Electric Lady Studios, WRXP New York (2010)

Singles from Phrazes for the Young
- 1. "11th Dimension" Released: October 2, 2009; 2. "Out of the Blue" Released: January 25, 2010

Professional ratings
Aggregate scores
Source	Rating
Metacritic	72/100
Review scores
Source	Rating
Allmusic	4/5 stars
The Guardian	3/5 stars
musicOMH	4/5 stars
NME	8/10
Now Magazine	4/5 stars
Pitchfork	5.5/10
PopMatters	8/10
Rolling Stone	3/5 stars
Spin	4/5 stars
The Times	4/5 stars
Uncut	4/5 stars

Phrazes for the Young is the debut solo album by American singer-songwriter Julian Casablancas. It was released through his own Cult Records label, via RCA and Rough Trade Records, on November 2, 2009, in the United Kingdom and the following day in the United States.

Casablancas, who is best known for being the front man of New York City-based rock band the Strokes, recorded the eight-song album in 2009 in New York City, Los Angeles, and Omaha, Nebraska. Jason Lader and Mike Mogis (the latter of Bright Eyes and Monsters of Folk) served as producers. The album title is a reference to Oscar Wilde's "Phrases and Philosophies for the Use of the Young". Casablancas' dog, Balki, is pictured on the album sleeve.

Critical reception was mostly positive, although Casablancas has since expressed regret about the project, stating, "I had all these different ideas, [but] I thought 'if I go too weird, people won't take it seriously,' so I did the safest ideas [...] And then... maybe it became this 'oh, this is what he does when he's on his own' vs. The Strokes, and that was annoying, frustrating."

== Release ==
The album was previewed in its entirety on August 31, 2009, at the Duo Music Exchange in Tokyo, Japan. To celebrate the release, Casablancas played a special series of shows every Friday night in November in Los Angeles. The first track released from the album, "11th Dimension", had its first airing on the Radio 1 Zane Lowe Show on September 17, and was marked as Zane Lowe's Hottest Record. The single was released on October 2, 2009, in the US.

Casablancas performed "I Wish It Was Christmas Today" (based on a Saturday Night Live skit) on Late Night with Jimmy Fallon on December 21, 2009. "Left & Right in the Dark", "Out of the Blue", "Ludlow St" and "11th Dimension" are featured in the Gossip Girl episode "The Lady Vanished"; "Out of the Blue" was featured in the trailer of The Kids Are All Right; and "11th Dimension" was featured in the opening of the 2015 comedy Vacation.

A deluxe box set including B-sides and home recordings was made available after the album's release. It comes with a vinyl recording of the album and is housed within an antique style box.

== Reception ==
Phrazes for the Young received mostly positive reviews upon release. NME awarded the album four stars out of five calling it "a little short, but oh so sweet." Pitchfork accused Casablancas of making "the classic rookie solo mistake of stuffing his songs with everything in the studio," while praising the "endearing silliness" of "11th Dimension" and the "gorgeous electro ballad" "Glass." They were less effusive of other aspects of the record comparing it to a "plexiglass-covered museum piece." They continued: "at this rate, this one-time wunderkind risks becoming little more than an emblem of the past if he can't figure out how to harness the present once again." Alexis Petridis writing in The Guardian was broadly positive about the record saying that when Casablancas "concentrates on making pop music...Phrazes for the Young is a blast." The Quietus called it "more of a vanity than a solo project." In the years following its release, Phrazes for the Young was viewed more positively and is now viewed as something of a cult record.

== Track listing ==
All tracks are written by Julian Casablancas, except where noted.

Phrazes for the Young track listing
No.	Title	Length
1.	"Out of the Blue"	4:43
2.	"Left & Right in the Dark"	4:58
3.	"11th Dimension"	4:05
4.	"4 Chords of the Apocalypse" (chorus chord progression by Casablancas, Fabrizio Moretti, Nick Valensi)	5:02
5.	"Ludlow St."	5:45
6.	"River of Brakelights"	5:13
7.	"Glass"	5:20
8.	"Tourist" (chorus melody by Casablancas, JP Bowersock)	5:02
Total length:		40:08

iTunes / Amazon bonus tracks
No.	Title	Length
9.	"Old Hollywood"	4:33
10.	"30 Minute Boyfriend"	3:31
11.	"Christmas Treat"	3:11
Total length:		51:23

Luxury Edition Deluxe Set bonus disc
No.	Title	Length
1.	"Ludlow St." (demo)	5:42
2.	"Left & Right in the Dark" (demo)	3:31
3.	"30 Minute Boyfriend" (demo)	3:42
4.	"Tourist" (demo)	6:22
5.	"Glass" (demo)	2:16
6.	"Long Island Blues"	5:40
7.	"Old Hollywood"	4:33
8.	"I Wish It Was Christmas Today"	3:11

Acoustically Remembering DVD
No.	Title	Length
1.	"11th Dimension (Take 2)"	5:31
2.	"Glass"	2:15
3.	"Left & Right in the Dark"	5:38
4.	"4 Chords of the Apocalypse"	6:05
5.	"Taxi Brakelights"	5:45
6.	"Thank You"	0:43
7.	"Original Screentest (River of Brakelights)"	3:23
8.	"11th Dimension (Take 1)"	5:17
Total length:		34:35

== Personnel ==
- Julian Casablancas – vocals, all instruments, songwriting
- Jason Lader – all instruments, production

Additional musicians

- Jen Turner – guitar on "Glass"
- Lenny Castro – additional percussion on "Ludlow St." intro; shaker on "11th Dimension"; sleigh bell on "Glass"; tambourine on "Out of the Blue"
- Nate Walcott – horns on "Tourist"; additional horns on "Ludlow St."
- Adam MacDougall – organs on "4 Chords of the Apocalypse"
- Blake Mills – guitar on "4 Chords of the Apocalypse", "Ludlow St." and "11th Dimension"
- Mike Mogis – guitar on "Tourist"

Technical personnel

- Jason Lader – production
- Mike Mogis – additional production
- Ray Aldaco – additional engineering
- Brian Sperber – mixing engineering
- Brian Gardner – mastering
- Steve Falone – mastering

Design

- Julian Casablancas and Warren Fu – art direction and concept
- Marc Burckhardt – dinosaur painting
- Warren Fu – art designer
- Williams + Hirakawa – photography

== Charts ==
Chart performance for Phrazes for the Young
Chart (2009)	Peak position
Australian Albums (ARIA)	55
Belgian Albums (Ultratop Wallonia)	96
French Albums (SNEP)	49
Irish Albums (IRMA)	30
Mexican Albums (Top 100 Mexico)	56
New Zealand Albums (RMNZ)	34
Swedish Albums (Sverigetopplistan)	49
Swiss Albums (Schweizer Hitparade)	64
UK Albums (Official Charts)	19
US Billboard 200	35
US Top Alternative Albums (Billboard)	10
US Top Rock Albums (Billboard)	12
US Indie Store Album Sales (Billboard)	5
