= Oh No Ono =

Danish musical group

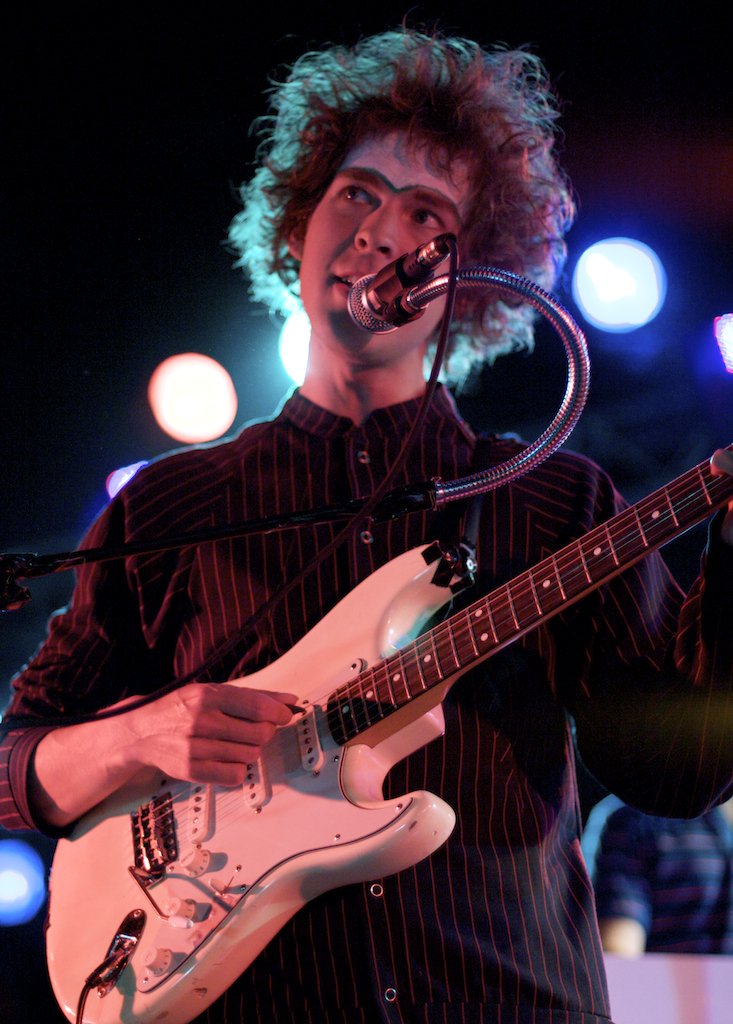
- Frontman Malthe Fischer performing with Oh No Ono in 2009

Background information
- Origin: Aalborg, Denmark
- Genres: Neo-psychedelia, alternative pop, electroclash, new wave
- Years active: 2003–2011
- Labels: The Leaf Label, Friendly Fire Recordings, Morningside Records, 01-170-0170
- Website: https://www.ohnoono.com

Oh No Ono was a musical quintet from Aalborg, Denmark. The band was formed in 2003 by Kristoffer Rom (drums), Kristian Olsen (keyboards, etc.), Malthe Fischer (vocals, guitar and samples) and Aske Zidore (guitar, vocals, samples).

== History ==
Oh No Ono released an EP (Now You Know Oh No Ono) in February 2005 and has since then been a highly influential band on the Danish music scene.

On their debut album Yes, the band, which has grown from 4 to 5 members since its beginning (with the addition of Nis Svoldgaard on bass), mixed old virtues with a modern sound and production, creating a mix of alternative pop, electroclash, funk and new wave. The vocals of Malthe Fischer move insistently on top of a collage of synthesizers, organ, syncopated guitars, slap bass and a tight cyber-funk groove. Yes was produced by Jesper Mortensen & Oh No Ono and it was recorded in Deltalab, Thomas Troelsen's studio where some of the most recognized Danish and international artists have recorded their material.

Kristian Olsen left in 2008 and was replaced by Nicolai Koch. Shortly after Kristians departure the band began recording their next album Eggs.

In 2009, band members founded the indie record label Tambourhinoceros.

Oh No Ono was featured in Marc Jacobs' Marc by Marc Jacobs Fall 2010 Ready to wear line.

Eggs was released in Denmark on April 20, 2009 by the mysterious label 01-1 170 0170 in collaboration with Morningside Records. Eggs was recorded over a period of 9 months in various Danish studios & churches. The band also experimented with recording in unusual places like forests, beaches, abandoned factories etc. and with building their own effects using contact microphones on different materials. Oh No Ono produced Eggs themselves.

Eggs was released worldwide in early 2010 by The Leaf Label and Friendly Fire Recordings.

In November 2011, after their studio was robbed, the band announced on their blog that they would no longer be performing as Oh No Ono.

== Discography ==
=== Albums ===
- Now You Know Oh No Ono (2005)
- Yes (2006)
- Eggs (2009)
