= Nothing's About to Happen to Me =

- Standard physical cover; the digital cover features a cropped version of this image

Studio album by Mitski
- Released: February 27, 2026
- Studios: Sunset Sound; TTG (Los Angeles)
- Genres: Americana; art pop
- Length: 34:27
- Label: Dead Oceans
- Producer: Patrick Hyland

Mitski chronology
The Land Is Inhospitable and So Are We (2023)	Nothing's About to Happen to Me (2026)

Singles from Nothing's About to Happen to Me
- 1. "Where's My Phone?" Released: January 16, 2026; 2. "I'll Change for You" Released: February 3, 2026; 3. "If I Leave" Released: February 27, 2026

Nothing's About to Happen to Me is the eighth studio album by the American singer-songwriter Mitski, released on February 27, 2026, through Dead Oceans.

== Background ==
On January 13, 2026, Mitski teased her eighth studio album on Instagram in a series of posts. The first post featured Mitski cooking in a kitchen, and a second post on January 14 showed Mitski throwing herself to the floor and whispering "nothing's about to happen to me", the album's title. She later posted the album's release date on January 15 with a video of the numbers "22726" being typed into a calculator. According to a press release, the album "finds Mitski immersing herself in a rich narrative whose main character is a reclusive woman in an unkempt house. Outside of her home, she is a deviant; inside of her home, she is free." The album cover is a painting by fine artist Marc Burckhardt.

== Recording ==
Nothing's About to Happen to Me sees Mitski pick up where she left off musically on her previous studio album The Land is Inhospitable and So Are We. Mitski reunites with Patrick Hyland as producer and engineer, with the album featuring instrumentation from The Land touring band, composed of Callan Dwan, Jeni Magaña, Bruno Esrubilsky, Ty Bailie, Fats Kaplin, and Brijean Murphy. Orchestra on the album was arranged and conducted by Drew Erickson with recording taking place at Sunset Sound and TTG Studios in Los Angeles. The album was mastered by Bob Weston.

== Promotion ==
=== Singles ===
"Where's My Phone?" was released as the first single alongside the announcement of Nothing's About to Happen to Me on January 16, 2026. Clash called the track a "fuzzed-out piece of anxiety-pop". The music video for "Where's My Phone?", directed by Noel Paul, was inspired by the Shirley Jackson novel We Have Always Lived in the Castle where Mitski takes on the role of a paranoid woman in a gothic house who is trying to protect her sister.

"I'll Change for You" debuted on BBC Radio 1's New Music Show with Jack Saunders on February 3, 2026 as the album's second single. Mitski said she "wanted to write a song about being pathetic" and the irrational actions from a breakup like begging an ex to take you back. Chris DeVille of Stereogum called the track "a gracefully resigned ballad that shows off Mitski's vocal prowess". Alfie Sansom from Argus Far described the song as "a tale of desperation, marinated in red wine and self-pity, starting to spill over like a bath too full." The music video for "I'll Change for You" was directed by Lexie Alley and it is "zeroing in on the chaotic, untidy Tansy House universe presented in the album’s photos by Alley." Simultaneously, Mitski announced tour dates including multi-date residencies in New York City, Los Angeles and Sydney.

Mitski performed "If I Leave" on Jimmy Kimmel Live! on April 8, 2026, in the album's television debut.

=== Tansy House Listening Events ===
On February 13, 2026, Mitski announced a series of worldwide listening parties, known as Tansy House Listening Events, for February 21 and February 26 at independent record stores. These events offer fans to an opportunity to listen to Nothing's About to Happen to Me before its full release on February 27.

== Critical reception ==
Professional ratings
Aggregate scores
Source	Rating
AnyDecentMusic?	8.5/10
Metacritic	87/100
Review scores
Source	Rating
AllMusic	4.5/5 stars
Consequence	B+
DIY	4/5 stars
Exclaim!	8/10
The Guardian	5/5 stars
The Line of Best Fit	7/10
Mojo	4/5 stars
NME	5/5 stars
Pitchfork	7.7/10
Record Collector	4/5 stars

Nothing's About to Happen to Me received a score of 87 out of 100 on review aggregator Metacritic based on 20 critics' reviews, which the website categorized as "universal acclaim".

Alexis Petridis in a five star review for The Guardian called Nothing's About to Happen to Me "thought-provoking" and "wrenching" across its 35-minute runtime with its central theme of yearning for anonymity and solitude, exemplified by tracks like "Cats" and "If I Leave". Petridis called the desire for anonymity and separation from the rest of the world, with parallels to Mitski's own relationship to fame, "timely and relatable" given the "unremitting barrage of horror that constitutes the news cycle". The track "Dead Women" was highlighted for its lyricism that straddles horror and comedy where Mitski pictures herself as a ghost as friends and former lovers incorrectly rewrite her life story into more heroic terms. Under the Radar saw contrasts in Nothing's About to Happen to Me's mediations on loneliness and isolation, creating "some of the most moving moments in Mitski's catalog, standing aside many of her darkest" in the same work.

Joe Goggins of NME wrote in a five star review that Mitski is in "top lyrical form" on Nothing's About to Happen to Me and has created the "most musically ambitious album of her career". Its thrashing guitar breakdowns call back to her earlier work Bury Me at Makeout Creek with Mitski transposing her older self onto her present-day stardom. The Line of Best Fit singled out the track "Charon's Obol" as a highlight from the album, calling it a "beautifully produced slice of symphonic pop" reminiscent of Scott Walker or Dusty Springfield. Pitchfork's Emma Madden felt that the track "That White Cat" failed to play to Mitski's strengths and that Mitski instead shines on a "self-effacing love song" like "I'll Change for You". In a B+ review, Paolo Ragusa for Consequence criticized Mitski's vocals and instrumentation for not fully reflecting the messiness of the unkempt, antisocial character she is playing.

== Track listing ==
All tracks are written by Mitski Miyawaki.

Nothing's About to Happen to Me track listing
No.	Title	Length
1.	"In a Lake"	3:04
2.	"Where's My Phone?"	3:09
3.	"Cats"	2:48
4.	"If I Leave"	3:00
5.	"Dead Women"	3:09
6.	"Instead of Here"	3:07
7.	"I'll Change for You"	3:16
8.	"Rules"	2:36
9.	"That White Cat"	3:11
10.	"Charon's Obol"	4:05
11.	"Lightning"	2:57
Total length:		34:27

== Personnel ==
Credits adapted from Tidal.

=== Musicians ===
- Mitski – vocals
- Drew Erickson – arrangement, conducting (all tracks); piano (tracks 6, 7), vibraphone (6)
- Patrick Hyland – guitar (1–6, 8–11), additional vocals (2, 9), synthesizer (5, 9), bass guitar (5), percussion (7)
- Jeni Magaña – bass guitar (1–4, 6–11), double bass (1), additional vocals (2, 9)
- Ty Bailie – organ (1, 3, 5, 6, 8, 10), accordion (1, 10), electric piano (2, 3, 5, 7, 8), synthesizer (5)
- Fats Kaplin – banjo (1), pedal steel guitar (3, 5, 6, 8, 10)
- Dan Higgins – bass clarinet (1, 3, 8); bass flute, flute (7)
- Andrew Bulbrook – first violin (1, 2, 5, 7, 10, 11)
- Xenia Deviatkina-Loh – second violin (1, 2, 5, 7, 10, 11)
- Rita Andrade – viola (1, 2, 5, 7, 10, 11)
- Christine Kim – cello (1, 2, 5, 7, 10, 11)
- Wayne Bergeron – flugelhorn, trumpet (1, 3, 8)
- Marie McGowan – French horn (1, 3, 8)
- Steve Holtman – trombone (1, 3, 8)
- Marlon Patton – drums (1, 5)
- Bruno Esrubilsky – drums (2–4, 6–10), additional vocals (2, 9)
- Callan Dwan – additional vocals (2, 9)
- Peter Stewart Mercer – additional vocals (2, 9)
- Pete Korpela – vibraphone (3, 4, 7, 10)
- Fabiano do Nascimento – guitar (7)
- David Michael Loucks – quartet vocals (10)
- Fletcher Sheridan – quartet vocals (10)
- Gregory Fletcher – quartet vocals (10)
- Jarrett Johnson – quartet vocals (10)

=== Technical ===
- Patrick Hyland – production, engineering, mixing
- Michael Harris – strings engineering
- Kris Bulakowski – additional engineering, drum technician
- Isaac Diskin – additional engineering (7), engineering assistance (1–6, 8–11), strings engineering assistance (1, 3–6, 8–11)
- Alex Miller – strings engineering assistance
- Bob Weston – mastering
- Marc Burckhardt- album art

== Charts ==
Chart performance for Nothing's About to Happen to Me
Chart (2026)	Peak position
Australian Albums (ARIA)	3
Austrian Albums (Ö3 Austria)	12
Belgian Albums (Ultratop Flanders)	11
Belgian Albums (Ultratop Wallonia)	41
Canadian Albums (Billboard)	50
Dutch Albums (Album Top 100)	15
Finnish Albums (Suomen virallinen lista)	20
French Albums (SNEP)	85
French Rock & Metal Albums (SNEP)	4
German Albums (Offizielle Top 100)	14
German Rock & Metal Albums (Offizielle Top 100)	4
Irish Albums (Official Charts)	24
Irish Independent Albums (IRMA)	4
Lithuanian Albums (AGATA)	59
New Zealand Albums (RMNZ)	8
Portuguese Albums (AFP)	25
Scottish Albums (Official Charts)	1
Spanish Albums (Promusicae)	63
Swedish Physical Albums (Sverigetopplistan)	10
Swiss Albums (Schweizer Hitparade)	44
UK Albums (Official Charts)	4
UK Americana Albums (Official Charts)	1
UK Independent Albums (Official Charts)	2
US Billboard 200	10
US Independent Albums (Billboard)	4
US Top Rock & Alternative Albums (Billboard)	2
