= Recurring Saturday Night Live characters and sketches introduced 2000–01 =

The following is a list of recurring Saturday Night Live characters and sketches introduced between October 7, 2000, and May 19, 2001, the twenty-sixth season of SNL.

== Gemini's Twin ==
Gemini's Twin is an R&B/pop music group composed of Jonette and Britanica, created for a series of sketches on Saturday Night Live and written by SNL writer James Anderson. The sketches featured Maya Rudolph and Ana Gasteyer as members of the group that satirized Destiny's Child. The two would incorporate hip-hop slang into their conversations in inappropriate ways, often misusing intellectual words or making up new words altogether, for example: "It's time to get musicational!", "Our music comes from a very emotionary place.", and "My caucasianality!" (stated by Jonette, who is white). It is then occasionally revealed that the band members attended elite colleges. Debuted November 4, 2000.

A celebrity (often the guest host) would often appear as the current third member of the band. The constantly changing members was a jab at the infamous turmoil and frequent lineup changes in Destiny's Child.

In one sketch, the real members of Destiny's Child appeared as former members of Gemini's Twin who had been kicked out of the band.

Appearances:

- Season 26, Episode 4 (November 4, 2000): with Charlize Theron as Salon
- Season 26, Episode 8 (December 16, 2000): with Lucy Liu as Binaca (who they added because she owns a minivan)
- Season 26, Episode 11 (February 10, 2001): with Jennifer Lopez as Lady Speed Stick
- Season 26, Episode 18 (May 5, 2001): with Pierce Brosnan as Embrosio Muller (a German model that played a Frankenstein-like character in a music video of theirs), Destiny’s Child as Serendipity’s Coincidence (three former Gemini's Twin members that started their own group)
- Season 27, Episode 5 (November 10, 2001): with Gwyneth Paltrow as Chanterell
- Season 27, Episode 12 (February 2, 2002): with Britney Spears as Dijonaise (with whom they star in an HBO original movie called Damn, My Dixie's on Fire)

== Jeannie Darcy ==
An uninspired stand up comedian with a mullet played by Molly Shannon. At the end of each bit, Jeannie Darcy would use the catchphrase: "Don't get me started, don't even get me started." Debuted November 18, 2000.

== Rap Street ==
Rap Street was a TV show sketch which appeared twice on Saturday Night Live in 2000. The hosts of Rap Street, Grandmaster Rap (a take-off on Grandmaster Flash played by Jerry Minor) and Kid Shazzam (Horatio Sanz) were caricatures of old school rappers who hearkened back to the early days of rap. They would often refer to their time spent in the Vietnam War, mention friends of theirs who had great-grandchildren or hip problems, and use plural forms where they didn't belong (i.e. "Vietnams", "hip-hops"). They spoke out against profanity in rap music, saying things like, "We didn't rap about givin' your man friend fellat-i-os. We rapped about good stuff, like sneakers." They would begin and end each show with a similar simplistic rap which went "Rap rap, ribbity rap rap, rip rop ribbity do!" (a send-up of "Rapper's Delight" by The Sugarhill Gang).

Grandmaster Rap and Kid Shazzam first appeared during Weekend Update on October 7, 2000. The first full-fledged Rap Street sketch, on November 18, 2000, featured Tom Green as MC Kevin Gustafson from Ottawa, Ontario. Episode 10 of season 26 featured Mena Suvari as Aaron Carter, who Rap and Shazzam accept due to his clean raps.

== Veronica & Co. ==
A Molly Shannon and Chris Parnell sketch. Debuted December 9, 2000. Molly Shannon played a supermodel host (a spoof of Gisele Bundchen, who Shannon impersonated a week before the week Veronica and Co. debuted), and Chris Parnell played the Times Square robot, alongside many other surprising guests.

== Jarret's Room ==
Jarret's Room was a recurring sketch from 2000 to 2004. It is presented as a webcast opened up on a Macintosh computer as if by the viewer. The webcast is hosted by two stoner Hampshire College students, the jovial cool guy Jarret (Jimmy Fallon) and the chubby, well-baked Gobi (Horatio Sanz). The theme music to Jarret's Room is Wilco's "I'm Always In Love". It is eventually revealed that the only person who watches the show is an Icelandic teenager, Jeorg (played by Ashton Kutcher, but Kutcher didn't play Jeorg until he first hosted in season 28). It frequently featured Seth Meyers as DJ Jonathan Feinstein starting in season 27 (Seann William Scott/Sum-41) and ending in season 29 (Lindsay Lohan/Usher). Other characters include Jarret's roommates, Daniel (played by Chris Parnell), who appeared in the episodes hosted by Lucy Liu and Katie Holmes, and Jeff (played by Jeff Richards), who appeared in later sketches.

The sketch benefited greatly from the formula of Mike Myers' Wayne's World: Jarret, the always enthusiastic and childlike host (similar to Wayne), is offset by his awkward co-host; the format is DIY and low-budget; and the guests are all friends of the host or co-host. However, in Jarret's Room, the humor was more drug-influenced (particularly focusing on marijuana), rather than the rock and roll and pop culture themes of Wayne's World.

In the Kirsten Dunst/Eminem episode, Dunst played a student who hosts a webcam show similar to Jarret's, also with a co-host, played by Amy Poehler. Because of these similarities, Jarret accused her of plagiarism.

In the Al Gore/Phish episode, Al Gore played a professor who reprimanded Jarret and Gobi for being slackers while musical guest Phish appeared as themselves, also being reprimanded by the professor, who claims that they were once students of his; he asks if they were still playing their music and tells them to "get a job, you dirty hippies".

In the Matthew McConaughey/Dixie Chicks episode, the actor reprised his Dazed and Confused role as David Wooderson, who remains at Hampshire College.

In May 2020, Fallon and Sanz reunited for a Jarret's Room sketch on The Tonight Show.

Appearances:

- December 16, 2000 host: Lucy Liu as Jenna
- February 24, 2001 host: Katie Holmes as Amber
- October 6, 2001 host: Seann William Scott as Jason Stamper
- December 8, 2001 host: Hugh Jackman as Stanley Justin
- February 2, 2002 host: Britney Spears as Summer
- May 11, 2002 host: Kirsten Dunst as Janet
- November 16, 2002 host: Brittany Murphy as Holly
- December 14, 2002 host: Al Gore as Dr. Ralph Wormly Curtis and musical guest Phish as themselves
- February 8, 2003 host: Matthew McConaughey as David Wooderson
- May 3, 2003 host: Ashton Kutcher as Jeorg
- February 14, 2004 host: Drew Barrymore as Gobi's sister
- May 1, 2004 host: Lindsay Lohan as Skylar, the student taking over Jarret's dorm after he moves out.

== Season's Greetings From Saturday Night Live (Christmas is Number One) ==
"I Wish It Was Christmas Today" Is a musical performance by Jimmy Fallon, Horatio Sanz, Chris Kattan, and Tracy Morgan singing the praises of Christmas. Sanz played a C.F. Martin & Company backpacker guitar and sang, Fallon sporadically played a keyboard, Kattan held the keyboard, and Morgan danced in place. The song generally appeared during Christmas time, but also appeared during other holiday seasons (though, always denouncing those holidays in favor of Christmas). At one point, they are even criticized by Simon Cowell, but he relents and proceeds to join them. The Muppets filled in for Fallon, Morgan, and Kattan once, performing the song with Sanz. Sanz and Fallon later performed the song on Late Night with Jimmy Fallon with musical guest Julian Casablancas. The original lineup for the sketch have since performed the song on The Tonight Show with Jimmy Fallon, being joined by Ariana Grande holding onto Kattan’s shoulders.

Appearances:

- December 9, 2000 – I Wish It Was Christmas Today on YouTube
- December 16, 2000 – I Wish It Was Christmas Today Reprise on YouTube
- May 19, 2001 – I Wish It Was Christmas Today Memorial Day on YouTube
- December 1, 2001 – I Wish It Was Christmas Today II on YouTube
- December 15, 2001 (sketch opens with Cheney staring into a snowglobe which then cuts to Homebase with Horatio and the rest of the guys)
- April 13, 2002 – A Message from Saturday Night Live on YouTube
- December 14, 2002 – I Wish It Was Christmas Today IV on YouTube
- April 10, 2004 – I Wish It Was Christmas Today V on YouTube
- December 18, 2004 – I Wish It Was Christmas Today (with the Muppets) on YouTube
- December 2009 – The Tonight Show Starring Jimmy Fallon – I Wish It Was Christmas Today (Fallon & Casablancas) on Facebook
- December 17, 2011 – I Wish It Was Christmas Today VI on YouTube
- December 18, 2018 – * December 2009 – The Tonight Show Starring Jimmy Fallon – I Wish It Was Christmas Today (featuring Ariana Grande) on Facebook

A "Summer's Greetings From Saturday Night Live" sketch never made it past dress rehearsal. This would have appeared in the May 17, 2003 episode, Kattan and Morgan's last episode as cast members, with Dan Aykroyd as the host.

In November 2009, the month prior to his live rendition with Sanz and Fallon, Casablancas released a studio recording of the song alongside his album, Phrazes for the Young. Cheap Trick covered the song on their 2017 album Christmas Christmas.

== Jeffrey's ==
Jimmy Fallon and the guest host play snooty retail workers at an upscale clothing store called Jeffrey's. The sketch parodied real-life boutique Jeffrey's. Customers who approach the pair for help are greeted with hostility and snobbery, which escalates into an argument and ends with them usually leaving the store. The employees' insults are directed at what they perceive to be the customers' lack of style or taste. Gags were based on the absurdity of Jeffrey's exclusivity and elitism. Fallon's character brags he owns "Moroccan dental floss" that costs more than one customer's entire wardrobe. The pair's boss is an ultra-chic fashionista type played by Will Ferrell who uses high-tech gadgets like a minuscule cell phone. In the Sean Hayes episode, Fallon and Hayes break character when Ferrell rides into the store on a motorized scooter. A recurring character played by Horatio Sanz is usually the last customer to encounter the Jeffrey's salesmen and gets into a protracted insult war with the pair.

Appearances:

- Season 26, Episode 12 (February 17, 2001): with Sean Hayes as Clerk #1
- Season 26, Episode 18 (May 5, 2001): with Pierce Brosnan as Clerk #1
- Season 27, Episode 2 (October 6, 2001): with Seann William Scott as Clerk #2

== The Lovers ==
Rachel Dratch and Will Ferrell play Virginia and Roger Clarvin, a couple of professors who have no scruples about discussing their sex lives. They have been seen in the hot tub of the Welshly Arms Hotel, the hotel lobby of Bear Claw Lodge, and at different locations. The skits usually begin with them introducing themselves to a guest; these conversations inevitably degenerate into the Clarvins describing the details of their sexual adventures. The Clarvins emphasize the word "lover", pronouncing it as "luv-uh." At the very end, Ferrell's character Roger typically experiences a pain in his back and exclaims "GET THE HELL OFF ME!" to his wife. A recurring character named Dave (Fallon), a traveling businessman, keeps running into the Clarvins by chance. The third appearance of the sketch was notable for all of the performers—including Will Ferrell and host Drew Barrymore—breaking character.

Dratch said the idea for the sketch originated from her college days. "There was a professor; my friend had her, and kind of got to be friends, and before the break for Christmas, she asked my friend what she was going to do and she said, 'I don't know.' And the teacher goes, 'Yes—just take it easy—read a book, take a bath, eat a bonbon, spend time with your luv-uh.' So that became for me and my friend just this big thing we would say all the time, luv-uh."

Appearances:

- Season 26, Episode 13 (February 24, 2001): with Katie Holmes as Gail
- Season 26, Episode 20 (May 19, 2001): with Christopher Walken as Walter
- Season 27, Episode 3 (October 13, 2001): with Drew Barrymore as Barbara Hernandez
- Season 27, Episode 11 (January 19, 2002): with Jack Black as William Mark Jaspers
- Season 27, Episode 18 (April 20, 2002): with Alec Baldwin as John Wellington
- Season 27, Episode 20 (May 18, 2002): with Winona Ryder as Clarissa, Dave's girlfriend
- Season 28, Episode 13 (February 22, 2003): with Christopher Walken as Walter

== Wake Up Wakefield! ==
Wake Up Wakefield! is the morning announcement program for Wakefield Middle School fictionally set in San Jose, California, and broadcast from the school's A/V department. It is hosted by two students, Megan (Maya Rudolph) and Sheldon (Rachel Dratch). The show begins with a voice-over by Megan, featuring the words "Wake Up Wakefield" written on a chalkboard. Megan is a typical (if somewhat vacuous) middle school girl who has a crush on another student named Randy Goldman (Jimmy Fallon), often bordering on obsession (she wears a shirt with his likeness on it, and admits that she camps outside his house when he's sleeping). Megan's crushes include not only Randy Goldman, but range from Justin Timberlake to Clay Aiken. Sheldon is an awkward male nerd who always wears a polo shirt with a tie and always addresses the audience with, "Hey." Sheldon is Megan's best friend, and it is implied that he has a crush on her. Sheldon always signs off with his trademark salute (similar to Doc Severinsen's on The Tonight Show).

The show serves to address current events at the school, but usually sidelines into a platform for Megan to talk about her love of Randy Goldman. Megan and Sheldon are joined on the show by "Jazz x 10", a jazz group made up of Sheldon's friends from band class. Jazz x 10 opens the show with a badly performed version of the song "Pick up the Pieces" by Average White Band.

Horatio Sanz often appears as Mr. Banglian, a teacher who inadvertently stumbles onto the show, and then when he realizes they're recording, proceeds to make an "important" announcement. Mr. Banglian often attempts to relate to the students by dancing, using hip hop slang, and adding an extraneous "-izz" infix to words (e.g. "hizzouse").

The host of the particular show has appeared in each sketch. In one sketch, Ray Romano plays Sheldon's geeky father in a dead-end job. In another, Jennifer Garner plays a geeky teen with a massive crush on Sheldon. Elijah Wood also appears as the trumpet player for Jazz x 10 and one of Sheldon's best friends. In another episode, Senator John McCain appears as a hippie stoner teacher named Pete Van Bleet. In the Natalie Portman episode, the sketch takes place at Sheldon's bar mitzvah, where Portman plays Sheldon's ex-girlfriend Rebecca Herschlag (Portman's actual surname).

Appearances:

- Season 26, Episode 15 (March 17, 2001): with Julia Styles as Samantha
- Season 27, Episode 1 (September 29, 2001): with Reese Witherspoon as Gretchen Doyle
- Season 27, Episode 10 (January 12, 2002): with Josh Hartnett as Zack Bodorf
- Season 27, Episode 19 (May 11, 2002): with Kirsten Dunst as Jenna
- Season 28, Episode 3 (October 19, 2002): with John McCain as Pete Van Bleet
- Season 28, Episode 12 (February 15, 2003): with Jennifer Garner as Tara Greenly
- Season 28, Episode 17 (April 12, 2003): with Ray Romano as Sheldon's dad
- Season 29, Episode 8 (December 13, 2003): with Elijah Wood as Greg
- Season 31, Episode 13 (March 4, 2006): with Natalie Portman as Rebecca Herschlag

Preceded by Recurring Saturday Night Live characters and sketches introduced 1999–2000	Recurring Saturday Night Live characters and sketches (listed chronologically)	Succeeded by Recurring Saturday Night Live characters and sketches introduced 2001–02
