= Laurel Hell Tour =

2022 concert tour by Mitski

- Tour by Mitski
- Location: Europe; North America; Latin America
- Associated album: Laurel Hell
- Start date: February 17, 2022
- End date: November 18, 2022
- No. of shows: 85
- Supporting acts: Cassandra Jenkins; Chai; Hurray for the Riff Raff; Indigo De Souza; Michelle; Sasami; Sorcha Richardson; Stella Donnelly; The Weather Station

Mitski concert chronology
- Be the Cowboy Tour (2018–2019); Laurel Hell Tour (2022); The Land Is Inhospitable and So Are We Tour (2024)

Laurel Hell Tour (also known as 2022 Tour) is a concert tour by Japanese-American singer-songwriter Mitski, in support of her sixth studio album Laurel Hell (2022). The tour began on February 17, 2022, in Asheville, North Carolina, United States, and concluded on November 18, 2022, in Mexico City, Mexico.

== Background ==
On October 5, 2021, Mitski announced the tour alongside the release of the single, "Working for the Knife". She then announced that rock band Chai, indie pop group Michelle and indie rock musician Sasami would support the tour as the opening acts during the first leg.

Due to a positive COVID-19 test in a touring party, Mitski postponed the shows in Boston, New York and Philadelphia in March. On April 5, 2022, Mitski announced the replacement dates, festival appearances and additional dates with supporting acts, indie rock musician Indigo De Souza, folk band The Weather Station and Americana project Hurray for the Riff Raff. Alongside headlining tour dates, Mitski would appear as the opening act for Harry Styles' Love On Tour during the United Kingdom stadium shows. Mitski announced the supporting acts for the second European leg, including Irish singer-songwriter Sorcha Richardson, American ambient pop singer Cassandra Jenkins and Australian indie rock musician Stella Donnelly.

== Set list ==
This set list is from the concert on February 17, 2022, in Asheville, North Carolina. It is not intended to represent all tour dates.

1. "Love Me More"
2. "Should've Been Me"
3. "Francis Forever"
4. "First Love / Late Spring"
5. "Me and My Husband"
6. "Stay Soft"
7. "Townie"
8. "I Don't Smoke"
9. "Once More to See You"
10. "Nobody"
11. "I Will"
12. "Drunk Walk Home"
13. "Happy"
14. "Your Best American Girl"
15. "I Bet on Losing Dogs"
16. "The Only Heartbreaker"
17. "Geyser"
18. "Working for the Knife"
19. "Heat Lightning"
20. "Goodbye, My Danish Sweetheart"
21. "Washing Machine Heart"
22. "A Pearl"

Encore

23. "Two Slow Dancers"

== Tour dates ==
List of concerts, showing date, city, country, venue and opening acts
| Date | City | Country | Venue | Opening acts |
Leg 1 — North America
| February 17, 2022 | Asheville | United States | The Orange Peel | Chai |
| February 18, 2022 | Raleigh | United States | The Ritz | Chai |
| February 19, 2022 | Atlanta | United States | The Eastern | Chai |
| February 21, 2022 | Birmingham | United States | Iron City | Chai |
| February 22, 2022 | New Orleans | United States | Civic Theatre | Chai |
| February 24, 2022 | Houston | United States | The Lawn at White Oak Music Hall | Chai |
| February 25, 2022 | Dallas | United States | The Factory in Deep Ellum | Chai |
| February 26, 2022 | Austin | United States | Austin City Limits Live at Moody Theater | Chai |
| February 28, 2022 | Phoenix | United States | The Van Buren | Chai |
| March 2, 2022 | Los Angeles | United States | Shrine Exposition Hall | Chai |
| March 3, 2022 | Los Angeles | United States | Shrine Exposition Hall | Chai |
| March 4, 2022 | Oakland | United States | Fox Oakland Theatre | Chai |
| March 5, 2022 | Oakland | United States | Fox Oakland Theatre | Chai |
| March 7, 2022 | Portland | United States | Arlene Schnitzer Concert Hall | Chai |
| March 9, 2022 | Seattle | United States | Moore Theatre | Chai |
| March 10, 2022 | Seattle | United States | Moore Theatre | Chai |
| March 12, 2022 | Denver | United States | Ogden Theatre | Michelle |
| March 14, 2022 | Saint Paul | United States | Palace Theatre | Michelle |
| March 15, 2022 | Milwaukee | United States | Miller High Life Theatre | Michelle |
| March 17, 2022 (Note: The concert on March 17, 2022 at the Masonic Temple Theater in Detroit was originally scheduled to take place at Royal Oak Music Theatre, but was relocated due to high demand.) | Detroit | United States | Detroit Masonic Temple Theater | Michelle |
| March 18, 2022 | Toronto | Canada | Massey Hall | Michelle |
| March 19, 2022 | Montreal | Canada | Théâtre Saint-Denis | Michelle |
| March 27, 2022 | Washington, D.C. | United States | The Anthem | Michelle |
| March 28, 2022 (Note: The concert on March 28, 2022 at The Anthem in Washington, D.C. was originally scheduled for March 26, but was rescheduled due to a positive COVID-19 case.) | Washington, D.C. | United States | The Anthem | Michelle |
| March 29, 2022 | Pittsburgh | United States | Stage AE | Michelle |
| March 30, 2022 | Louisville | United States | Old Forester's Paristown Hall | Michelle |
| March 31, 2022 | Nashville | United States | Ryman Auditorium | Michelle |
Leg 2 — Europe
| April 21, 2022 | Bristol | England | Marble Factory | Sasami |
| April 22, 2022 (Note: The concert on April 22, 2022 at the University Union Refectory in Leeds was originally scheduled to take place at University Stylus, but was relocated due to high demand.) | Leeds | England | University of Leeds Refectory | Sasami |
| April 23, 2022 (Note: The concert on April 23, 2022 at the Barrowland Ballroom in Glasgow was originally scheduled to take place at Queen Margaret Union, but was relocated due to high demand.) | Glasgow | Scotland | Barrowland Ballroom | Sasami |
| April 25, 2022 | Dublin | Ireland | Vicar Street | Sasami |
| April 26, 2022 (Note: The concert on April 26, 2022 at the Manchester Academy in Manchester was originally scheduled to take place at O_{2} Ritz, but was relocated due to high demand.) | Manchester | England | Manchester Academy | Sasami |
| April 28, 2022 | London | England | Roundhouse | Sasami |
| April 29, 2022 | London | England | O_{2} Academy Brixton | Sasami |
| April 30, 2022 (Note: The concert on April 30, 2022 at the Le Botanique in Brussels is a part of Les Nuits Botanique.) | Brussels | Belgium | Le Botanique | Sasami |
| May 2, 2022 | Tourcoing | France | Le Grand Mix | Sasami |
| May 3, 2022 (Note: The concert on May 3, 2022 at the Olympia in Paris was originally scheduled to take place at Cabaret Sauvage, but was relocated due to high demand.) | Paris | France | Olympia | Sasami |
| May 4, 2022 | Amsterdam | Netherlands | Paradiso | Sasami |
| May 6, 2022 (Note: The concert on May 6, 2022 at the Kaufleuten in Zürich was originally scheduled to take place at Docks, but was relocated due to high demand.) | Zürich | Switzerland | Kaufleuten | Sasami |
| May 7, 2022 | Lausanne | Switzerland | Docks | Sasami |
| May 9, 2022 | Berlin | Germany | Metropol | Sasami |
| May 10, 2022 | Copenhagen | Denmark | Vega | Sasami |
| May 11, 2022 (Note: The concert on May 11, 2022 at the Fållan in Stockholm was originally scheduled to take place at Nalen, but was relocated due to high demand.) | Stockholm | Sweden | Fållan | Sasami |
| May 12, 2022 (Note: The concert on May 12, 2022 at the Sentrum Scene in Oslo was originally scheduled to take place at Rockefeller Music Hall, but was relocated due to high demand.) | Oslo | Norway | Sentrum Scene | Sasami |
| May 14, 2022 | Hamburg | Germany | Fabrik | Sasami |
| May 15, 2022 | Cologne | Germany | Carlswerk Victoria | Sasami |
| May 17, 2022 | Vienna | Austria | WUK | Sasami |
| May 18, 2022 (Note: The concert on May 18, 2022 at the Archa Theatre in Prague was originally scheduled to take place at Rock Cafe, but was relocated due to high demand.) | Prague | Czechia | Archa Theatre | Sasami |
| May 19, 2022 | Munich | Germany | Strom | Sasami |
| May 21, 2022 | Istanbul | Turkey | Zorlu Performing Arts Centre | —N/a |
| June 12, 2022 | Belfast | Northern Ireland | Ulster Hall | Sorcha Richardson |
| June 13, 2022 | Dublin | Ireland | 3Olympia Theatre | Sorcha Richardson |
| June 21, 2022 | Cardiff | Wales | The Great Hall | Cassandra Jenkins |
| June 22, 2022 | Liverpool | England | Mountford Hall | Cassandra Jenkins |
| June 24, 2022 (Note: The concert on June 24, 2022 at the Dreamland in Margate is a part of LEISURE.) | Margate | England | Dreamland | —N/a |
| June 25, 2022 (Note: The concert on June 25, 2022 at the Worthy Farm in Pilton is a part of Glastonbury Festival.) | Pilton | England | Worthy Farm | —N/a |
| June 27, 2022 | Utrecht | Netherlands | Tivoli | Stella Donnelly |
| June 28, 2022 | Utrecht | Netherlands | Tivoli | Stella Donnelly |
| June 30, 2022 | Berlin | Germany | Verti Music Hall | Stella Donnelly |
| July 1, 2022 (Note: The concert on July 1, 2022 at Darupvej in Roskilde is a part of Roskilde Festival.) | Roskilde | Denmark | Darupvej | —N/a |
| July 2, 2022 (Note: The concert on July 2, 2022 at Gärdet in Stockholm is a part of Lollapalooza Stockholm.) | Stockholm | Sweden | Gärdet | —N/a |
| July 5, 2022 (Note: The concert on July 5, 2022 at in Montreux is a part of Montreux Jazz Festival.) | Montreux | Switzerland | Montreux Jazz Lab | —N/a |
Leg 3 — North America
| July 14, 2022 | Minneapolis | United States | Surly Brewing Festival Field | Indigo De Souza |
| July 16, 2022 (Note: The concert on July 16, 2022 at Union Park in Chicago is a part of Pitchfork Music Festival.) | Chicago | United States | Union Park | —N/a |
| July 22, 2022 (Note: The concert on July 22, 2022 at the Radio City Music Hall in New York City was originally scheduled for March 24, but was rescheduled due to a positive COVID-19 case.) | New York | United States | Radio City Music Hall | The Weather Station |
| July 23, 2022 | New York | United States | Radio City Music Hall | The Weather Station |
| July 24, 2022 (Note: The concert on July 24, 2022 at the Franklin Music Hall in Philadelphia was originally scheduled for March 25, but was rescheduled due to a positive COVID-19 case.) | Philadelphia | United States | Franklin Music Hall | The Weather Station |
| July 26, 2022 (Note: The concert on July 26, 2022 at the Roadrunner in Boston was originally scheduled for March 21, but was rescheduled due to a positive COVID-19 case.) | Boston | United States | Roadrunner | The Weather Station |
| July 27, 2022 (Note: The concert on July 27, 2022 at the Roadrunner in Boston was originally scheduled for March 22, but was rescheduled due to a positive COVID-19 case.) | Boston | United States | Roadrunner | The Weather Station |
| July 28, 2022 | East Providence | United States | Bold Point | The Weather Station |
| July 30, 2022 (Note: The concert on July 30, 2022 at the Parc Jean-Drapeau in Montreal is a part of Osheaga Festival.) | Montreal | Canada | Parc Jean-Drapeau | —N/a |
| August 7, 2022 (Note: The concert on July 30, 2022 at the Golden Gate Park in San Francisco is a part of Outside Lands.) | San Francisco | United States | Golden Gate Park | —N/a |
| August 9, 2022 | Troutdale | United States | McMenamin's Edgefield Amphitheater | —N/a |
| August 10, 2022 | Burnaby | Canada | Deer Lake Park | Hurray for the Riff Raff |
| August 12, 2022 (Note: The concert on August 12, 2022 at the Fisher Green Pavilion in Seattle is a part of Day In Day Out.) | Seattle | United States | Fisher Green Pavilion | —N/a |
| September 16, 2022 (Note: The concert on September 16, 2022 at the Los Angeles Historic State Park in Los Angeles is a part of Primavera Sound Los Angeles.) | Los Angeles | United States | Los Angeles State Historic Park | —N/a |
| October 1, 2022 (Note: The concert on October 1, 2022 at the Merriweather Post Pavilion in Columbia is a part of All Things Go Festival.) | Columbia | United States | Merriweather Post Pavilion | —N/a |
Leg 4 - Latin America
| November 5, 2022 (Note: The concert on November 5, 2022 at Distrito Anhembi in São Paulo is a part of Primavera Sound.) | São Paulo | Brazil | Distrito Anhembi | —N/a |
| November 7, 2022 | Rio de Janeiro | Brazil | Sacadura 154 | —N/a |
| November 10, 2022 | Buenos Aires | Argentina | Teatro Vorterix | —N/a |
| November 12, 2022 (Note: The concert on November 12, 2022 at the Costanera Sur in Buenos Aires is a part of Primavera Sound.) | Buenos Aires | Argentina | Costanera Sur | —N/a |
| November 13, 2022 (Note: The concert on November 13, 2022 at the Parque Bicentenario de Cerrillos in Santiago is a part of Primavera Sound.) | Santiago | Chile | Parque Bicentenario de Cerrillos | —N/a |
| November 15, 2022 | Lima | Peru | Arena Perú (Hall) | Santa Madero |
| November 16, 2022 | Lima | Peru | Arena Perú (Hall) | Santa Madero |
| November 18, 2022 (Note: The concert on November 18, 2022 at the Autódromo Hermanos Rodríguez in Mexico City is a part of Corona Capital.) | Mexico City | Mexico | Autódromo Hermanos Rodríguez | —N/a |
