= Be the Cowboy Tour =

2018–19 concert tour by Mitski

- Tour by Mitski
- Location: Asia; Europe; North America; Oceania
- Associated album: Be the Cowboy
- Start date: August 12, 2018
- End date: September 8, 2019
- No. of shows: 106
- Supporting acts: Katie Von Schleicher; Caroline Rose; Sidney Gish; EERA; Jessica Lea Mayfield; Overcoats; Sasami; Downtown Boys; Jay Som; Dilly Dally; Julianna Barwick; Lucy Dacus

Mitski concert chronology
- A Solo Tour of Beautiful Places (2018); Be the Cowboy Tour (2018–19); Laurel Hell Tour (2022)

Be the Cowboy Tour was a concert tour by Japanese-American singer-songwriter Mitski, in support of her fifth studio album Be the Cowboy (2018). The tour began on August 12, 2018, in Providence, Rhode Island, United States and concluded on September 8, 2019, in New York City, United States.

== Background ==
In mid-2018, Mitski embarked on a concert tour called A Solo Tour of Beautiful Places. She visited cities that she did not usually get to play on tour in United States where she played solo without full-band. On June 4, 2018, she announced the European and North American tour dates, in support of Be the Cowboy. Katie Von Schleicher, Caroline Rose, EERA and Jessica Lea Mayfield were announced as the tour openers. On August 2, 2018, Mitski expanded North American tour with the opening act Sidney Gish. Mitski was announced to perform at the 2019 St Jerome's Laneway Festival, touring Australia and New Zealand, as well as sideshows. On November 26, 2018, she announced the tour dates in Asia, set in February 2019. She then announced additional tour dates in North America, Asia and Europe, alongside festival appearances.

== Set list ==
This set list is from the concert on December 1, 2018, in Brooklyn. It is not intended to represent all tour dates.

1. "Remember My Name"
2. "I Don't Smoke"
3. "Washing Machine Heart"
4. "First Love / Late Spring"
5. "Francis Forever"
6. "Me and My Husband"
7. "Dan the Dancer"
8. "Once More to See You"
9. "A Pearl"
10. "Thursday Girl"
11. "I Will"
12. "Townie"
13. "Nobody"
14. "I Bet on Losing Dogs"
15. "I Want You"
16. "Your Best American Girl"
17. "Why Didn't You Stop Me?"
18. "Geyser"
19. "Happy"
20. "Come into the Water"
21. "Drunk Walk Home"
22. "A Burning Hill"
23. "My Body's Made of Crushed Little Stars"

Encore

24. "Two Slow Dancers"
25. "Goodbye, My Danish Sweetheart"

== Tour dates ==
List of concerts, showing date, city, country, venue and opening acts
Date	City	Country	Venue	Opening acts
A Solo Tour of Beautiful Places
June 9, 2018	Bozeman	United States	Rialto Bozeman	—N/a
June 12, 2018	Fort Collins	United States	The Armory	Katie Von Schleicher
June 14, 2018	Santa Fe	United States	Meow Wolf	Katie Von Schleicher
June 15, 2018	El Paso	United States	The Lowbrow Palace	Katie Von Schleicher
June 16, 2018	Marfa	United States	Crowley Theater	Katie Von Schleicher
June 20, 2018	Oxford	United States	Proud Larry's	Katie Von Schleicher
June 22, 2018	Gainesville	United States	High Dive	Katie Von Schleicher
June 23, 2018	Savannah	United States	El Rocko	Katie Von Schleicher
June 30, 2018	Woodstock	United States	Colony	Caroline Rose
Be the Cowboy Tour Leg 1 — North America
August 12, 2018	Providence	United States	Columbus Theatre	Sidney Gish
August 13, 2018	Portsmouth	United States	3S Artspace	Sidney Gish
August 14, 2018	Portland	United States	Space Gallery	Sidney Gish
August 15, 2018	Burlington	United States	Higher Ground Showcase Lounge	Sidney Gish
August 16, 2018	Holyoke	United States	Gateway City Arts	Sidney Gish
August 28, 2018	New York City	United States	Elsewhere	Sidney Gish
Leg 2 — Europe
September 19, 2018	Manchester	United Kingdom	Manchester Gorilla	EERA
September 20, 2018	Glasgow	United Kingdom	Saint Luke's	EERA
September 22, 2018	Dublin	Ireland	Tivoli Theatre	EERA
September 24, 2018	Leeds	United Kingdom	Brudenell Social Club	EERA
September 25, 2018	Bristol	United Kingdom	Trinity Arts Centre	EERA
September 26, 2018	London	United Kingdom	O_{2} Shepherd's Bush Empire	EERA
September 28, 2018	Paris	France	La Maroquinerie	EERA
September 29, 2018	Antwerp	Belgium	TRIX	EERA
October 1, 2018	Cologne	Germany	Gebäude 9	EERA
October 2, 2018	Amsterdam	Netherlands	Paradiso Noord	EERA
October 4, 2018	Berlin	Germany	Musik & Frieden	EERA
October 5, 2018	Copenhagen	Denmark	Vega	EERA
October 6, 2018	Hamburg	Germany	Uebel & Gefährlich	EERA
Leg 3 — North America
October 19, 2018	Philadelphia	United States	Union Transfer	Jessica Lea Mayfield
October 20, 2018	Boston	United States	House of Blues	Jessica Lea Mayfield
October 21, 2018 (Note: The concert on October 21, 2018 at the Club Soda in Montreal was scheduled to take place at the L'Astral but relocated due to high demand.)	Montreal	Canada	Club Soda	Overcoats
October 22, 2018 (Note: The concert on October 22, 2018 at the Danforth Music Hall in Toronto was scheduled to take place at the Opera House, then Phoenix Concert Theatre, but relocated due to high demand.)	Toronto	Canada	Danforth Music Hall	Overcoats
October 23, 2018	Detroit	United States	Magic Stick	Jessica Lea Mayfield
October 25, 2018	Chicago	United States	The Vic Theatre	Jessica Lea Mayfield
October 26, 2018	Minneapolis	United States	First Avenue	Jessica Lea Mayfield
October 30, 2018	Vancouver	Canada	Imperial	Jessica Lea Mayfield
October 31, 2018	Seattle	United States	The Showbox	Jessica Lea Mayfield
November 1, 2018	Portland	United States	Crystal Ballroom	Jessica Lea Mayfield
November 3, 2018	San Francisco	United States	Warfield Theatre	Jessica Lea Mayfield
November 7, 2018	Los Angeles	United States	The Wiltern Theatre	Jessica Lea Mayfield
November 8, 2018	Phoenix	United States	Crescent Ballroom	Jessica Lea Mayfield
November 10, 2018	Austin	United States	Emo's	Jessica Lea Mayfield
November 11, 2018	Dallas	United States	Trees	Jessica Lea Mayfield
November 13, 2018	Nashville	United States	The Basement East	Jessica Lea Mayfield
November 14, 2018	Atlanta	United States	The Masquerade	Jessica Lea Mayfield
November 16, 2018	Washington, D.C.	United States	9:30 Club	Jessica Lea Mayfield
November 30, 2018	New York City	United States	Brooklyn Steel	Sasami; Downtown Boys
December 1, 2018	New York City	United States	Brooklyn Steel	Sasami; Downtown Boys
December 2, 2018	New York City	United States	Brooklyn Steel	Sasami; Downtown Boys
December 3, 2018	New York City	United States	Brooklyn Steel	Sasami; Downtown Boys
Leg 4 — Oceania
January 28, 2019 (Note: These concerts were part of St Jerome's Laneway Festival.)	Auckland	New Zealand	Albert Park	—N/a
February 2, 2019	Brisbane	Australia	Brisbane Showgrounds	—N/a
February 3, 2019	Sydney	Australia	Callan Park	—N/a
February 4, 2019	Sydney	Australia	Oxford Art Factory	—N/a
February 7, 2019	Melbourne	Australia	Corner Hotel	—N/a
February 8, 2019	Adelaide	Australia	Hart's Mill	—N/a
February 9, 2019	Melbourne	Australia	Footscray Park	—N/a
February 10, 2019	Fremantle	Australia	Esplanade Reserve and West End	—N/a
Leg 5 — Asia
February 12, 2019	Tokyo	Japan	Shibuya WWWX	—N/a
February 13, 2019	Osaka	Japan	Umeda Shangri-La	—N/a
February 15, 2019	Seoul	South Korea	Rolling Hall	—N/a
February 16, 2019	Taipei	Taiwan	The Wall	—N/a
February 18, 2019	Kuala Lumpur	Malaysia	The Bee	—N/a
February 20, 2019	Jakarta	Indonesia	Rossi Musik	—N/a
February 23, 2019	Singapore		Kilo Lounge	—N/a
Leg 6 — North America
March 29, 2019	Millvale	United States	Mr. Smalls	Jay Som
March 30, 2019	Columbus	United States	The Athenaeum	Jay Som
March 31, 2019	Louisville	United States	Headliners Music Hall	Jay Som
April 2, 2019	Indianapolis	United States	Deluxe at Old National Centre	Jay Som
April 3, 2019	Madison	United States	Majestic Theatre	Jay Som
April 5, 2019 (Note: The concert on April 5, 2018 at the Englert Theatre in Iowa City was a part of Mission Creek Music and Arts Festival.)	Iowa City	United States	Englert Theatre	—N/a
April 6, 2019	Kansas City	United States	Knuckleheads Saloon	Jay Som
April 7, 2019	St. Louis	United States	Delmar Hall	Jay Som
April 9, 2019	Athens	United States	40 Watt Club	Jay Som
April 10, 2019	Tallahassee	United States	The Moon	Jay Som
April 11, 2019	Orlando	United States	The Plaza Live Theatre	Jay Som
April 13, 2019 (Note: The concert on April 13, 2019 at the Riverfront Park in North Charleston was a part of High Water Festival.)	North Charleston	United States	Riverfront Park	—N/a
April 14, 2019	Gainesville	United States	08 Seconds	Jay Som
April 16, 2019	Carrboro	United States	Cat's Cradle	Jay Som
April 17, 2019	Carrboro	United States	Cat's Cradle	Jay Som
April 18, 2019	Richmond	United States	The National	Jay Som
April 19, 2019	Baltimore	United States	Rams Head Live!	Jay Som
April 20, 2019	North Adams	United States	Hunter Center	Jay Som
April 27, 2019 (Note: The concert on April 27, 2019 at the Brown University in Providence was a part of Spring Weekend.)	Providence	United States	Brown University	—N/a
May 25, 2019 (Note: The concert on May 25, 2019 at the Harvard Athletic Complex in Boston was a part of Boston Calling Music Festival.)	Boston	United States	Harvard Athletic Complex	—N/a
May 31, 2019 (Note: The concert on May 31, 2019 at the Randalls Island in New York was a part of Governors Ball Music Festival.)	New York City	United States	Randalls Island	—N/a
June 2, 2019	Dallas	United States	Canton Hall	Dilly Dally
June 4, 2019	Austin	United States	ACL Live at the Moody Theater	—N/a
June 5, 2019	Houston	United States	White Oak Music Hall	Dilly Dally
June 6, 2019	San Antonio	United States	Paper Tiger	Dilly Dally
July 14, 2019 (Note: The concert on July 14, 2019 at the Sigmund Stern Recreation Grove in San Francisco was a part of Stern Grove Festival.)	San Francisco	United States	Sigmund Stern Recreation Grove	—N/a
July 16, 2019	Los Angeles	United States	Hollywood Palladium	Julianna Barwick
July 19, 2019 (Note: The concert on July 19, 2019 at the Capitol Hill in Seattle was a part of Capitol Hill Block Party.)	Seattle	United States	Capitol Hill	—N/a
Leg 7 — Asia
July 26, 2019 (Note: The concert on July 26, 2019 at the Naeba Ski Resort in Niigata was a part of Fuji Rock Festival.)	Niigata	Japan	Naeba Ski Resort	—N/a
Leg 8 — North America
August 2, 2019 (Note: The concert on August 2, 2019 at the Parc Jean-Drapeau in Montreal was a part of Osheaga Festival.)	Montreal	Canada	Parc Jean-Drapeau	—N/a
August 4, 2019 (Note: The concert on August 4, 2019 at the Grant Park in Chicago was a part of Lollapalooza.)	Chicago	United States	Grant Park	—N/a
Leg 9 — Europe
August 8, 2019 (Note: The concert on August 8, 2019 at the Tøyen Park in Oslo was a part of Øyafestivalen.)	Oslo	Norway	Tøyen Park	—N/a
August 9, 2019 (Note: The concert on August 9, 2019 at the Slottsskogen in Gothenburg was a part of Way Out West.)	Gothenburg	Sweden	Slottsskogen	—N/a
August 11, 2019 (Note: The concert on August 11, 2019 at the Suvilahti in Helsinki was a part of Flow Festival.)	Helsinki	Finland	Suvilahti	—N/a
August 13, 2019	Vienna	Austria	Flex	—N/a
August 15, 2019	Berlin	Germany	Heimathafen	—N/a
August 17, 2019 (Note: The concert on August 17, 2019 at the Praia Fluvial do Taboão in Parades de Coura was a part of Paredes de Coura Festival.)	Paredes de Coura	Portugal	Praia Fluvial do Taboão	—N/a
August 30, 2019 (Note: The concert on August 30, 2019 at the Larmer Tree Gardens in Salisbury was a part of End of the Road Festival.)	Salisbury	United Kingdom	Larmer Tree Gardens	—N/a
September 1, 2019 (Note: The concert on September 1, 2019 at the Stradbally Hall in Stradbally was a part of Electric Picnic.)	Stradbally	Ireland	Stradbally Hall	—N/a
Leg 10 — North America
September 7, 2019	New York City	United States	Central Park Summer Stage	Lucy Dacus
September 8, 2019	New York City	United States	Central Park Summer Stage	Lucy Dacus
