= Where Do Broken Hearts Go (disambiguation) =

"Where Do Broken Hearts Go" may refer to:

- "Where Do Broken Hearts Go", 1988 single from Whitney Houston's second album Whitney.
- "Where Do Broken Hearts Go (One Direction song), 2014 promotional single by One Direction from their album Four
