= Jin Maley =

American actor

- Education: Oberlin College (BA); Harvard University (MFA); Dominican University of California (attended)
- Occupation: Actor
- Website: Official website

Jin Maley is an American actor. They are known for playing the role of Ensign Kova Rin Esmar on the third season of Star Trek: Picard.

Maley earned an M.F.A. in acting from the Institute for Advanced Theater Training at Harvard University. They coach acting in Los Angeles, California.

Maley is an associate artist with Sinking Ship Productions. Their work with that company includes Cassandra, an Agony, which was commissioned by the Getty Villa in 2022.

Maley's other stage credits include the part of Ariel in a 2023 production of The Tempest at the Shakespeare Center of Los Angeles.

Maley also starred in singer-songwriter, Mitski’s “Happy” music video from her 2016 studio album Puberty 2.

Maley is nonbinary and goes by they/them pronouns. Their character Esmar on Star Trek: Picard also uses they/them pronouns, which Maley said is "really cool".

== Filmography ==
=== Film ===
Year	Title	Role	Notes
2010	Death (A Love Story)	Tourist	Short film
2013	The Sweetest Story Ever Told	Jessica	Short film
2013	Jackass Presents: Bad Grandpa	Themself	
2015	The Man	Lina	Short film
2017	Gregory Crewdson: There But Not There	Themself	Documentary short
2017	Y2-10-10-1	X2-0-10-0	Short film
2017	Bodied	Becky	Short film

=== Television ===
Year	Title	Role	Notes
2015	My Haunted House	Helen	Episode: "The Witching Hour & the 13th Step"
2016	Bones	Ms. Susan	Episode: "The Movie in the Making"
2016	NCIS: Los Angeles	Shu Chen	Recurring role; 3 episodes
2016	Rizzoli & Isles	Technician	Episode: "Two Shots: Move Forward"
2016	Gilmore Girls: A Year in the Life	Korean Girl Singer #3	Episode: "Spring"
2017	Grey's Anatomy	Reporter #1	Episode: "Don't Stop Me Now"
2017	Criminal Minds	Reporter	Episode: "A Good Husband"
2017	Silicon Valley	Gladys	Episode: "Server Error"
2018	Shameless (U.S)	Makayla	Episode: "Weirdo Gallagher Vortex"
2019	The Young and the Restless	Joanna	Episode: #1.11603
2019	NCIS	NCIS Probationary Agent Anna Ventura	Episode: "The Last Link"
2019	Total Eclipse	Ms. Dawson	Recurring role; 10 episodes
2022	As We See It	Lake	Recurring role; 5 episodes
2022	First Love	Voice	Recurring role; 2 episodes (English dub)
2023	Star Trek: Picard	Ensign Esmar	Recurring role; 10 episodes
2024	Good Trouble	Laine	Episode: "I Am Doll Parts"

=== Videogames ===
Year	Title	Voice role	Notes
2023	Hellboy Web of Wyrd	Mads	
2024	Dragon Age: The Veilguard	Taash	

=== Music video ===
Year	Title	Artist	Role	Notes
2016	"Happy"	Mitski	Themself	
