= Laurel Hell =

- Digital edition cover. LP and CD pressings have unique cover art.

Studio album by Mitski
- Released: February 4, 2022
- Genres: Synth-pop; indie pop; electro-rock
- Length: 32:25
- Label: Dead Oceans
- Producer: Patrick Hyland

Mitski chronology
Be the Cowboy (2018)	Laurel Hell (2022)	The Land Is Inhospitable and So Are We (2023)

Singles from Laurel Hell
- 1. "Working for the Knife" Released: October 5, 2021; 2. "The Only Heartbreaker" Released: November 9, 2021; 3. "Heat Lightning" Released: December 7, 2021; 4. "Love Me More" Released: January 12, 2022; 5. "Should've Been Me" Released: September 26, 2022

Laurel Hell is the sixth studio album by American singer-songwriter Mitski, released on February 4, 2022, through Dead Oceans. Patrick Hyland produced the album, which has been characterized as a record blending synth-pop, indie pop and electronic rock styles. According to Mitski, the album title is a folk term for being trapped in thickets of laurel that grow in the southern Appalachian Mountains.

The album was preceded by the lead single "Working for the Knife" on October 5, 2021, and the second single "The Only Heartbreaker" on November 9, 2021. They were followed by two more singles: "Heat Lightning" and "Love Me More". Mitski promoted the album with the Laurel Hell Tour covering North America and Europe and running from February to November 2022.

Upon release, Laurel Hell received acclaim from music critics, who praised its lyrics and production. Commercially, the album peaked inside the top ten in territories such as Australia, Ireland, the United Kingdom, and the United States, marking Mitski's highest-charting record in all of them. It was also the best-selling album in the US during the week of its release, and the first Billboard 200 top-ten album for Dead Oceans. Laurel Hell also became her first album to top the US Top Alternative and Rock Albums charts.

== Background ==
Mitski wrote most of the album's songs before and during 2018, finishing the album during the COVID-19 lockdowns. Mitski also described the album as a "soundtrack for transformation, a map to the place where vulnerability and resilience, sorrow and delight, error and transcendence can all sit within our humanity, can all be seen as worthy of acknowledgment, and ultimately, love". She expressed that she wrote the album as she "needed love songs about real relationships that are not power struggles to be won or lost" as well as "songs that could help me forgive both others and myself. ... I needed to create this space mostly for myself where I sat in that gray area."

== Composition ==
Laurel Hell is a synth-pop, indie pop, and electro-rock album influenced by the sounds of the 1980s. It incorporates elements of new wave, pop, disco, and dance music as well. The album was previously conceived as a punk album, then a country album, before settling on its current electronic form. Album opener "Valentine, Texas" "builds into a swelling, glam rock instrumental break, with glimmering synths and driving piano lines" as "the narrator wonders who she'll be tonight; opening the door to a new self, she hopes the mountains in the distance will help lighten the mental weight she carries." "Working for the Knife" puts a "dream pop spin on the avant-garde industrial music of the late eighties". On "Stay Soft", Mitski sings about "providing love to someone who isn't willing to give it back, retreating into a shell caused by past wounds". On "Everyone", Mitski sings of "leaving, running and abandonment" over techno beats. "The Only Heartbreaker" is an '80s new wave and Scandipop song "where Mitski grapples with feeling like she can't pull her weight in a relationship." "Heat Lightning" is a song about insomnia that resembles an R&B slow jam. "Should've Been Me" is a baroque pop song "that finds Mitski witnessing a lost love attempt to find solace in a copy of herself."

== Critical reception ==
Professional ratings
Aggregate scores
Source	Rating
AnyDecentMusic?	7.8/10
Metacritic	83/100
Review scores
Source	Rating
AllMusic	4/5 stars
The A.V. Club	B−
The Daily Telegraph	4/5 stars
DIY	4.5/5 stars
Exclaim!	9/10
The Independent	4/5 stars
NME	4/5 stars
The Observer	5/5 stars
Pitchfork	7.8/10
Rolling Stone	4/5 stars

At Metacritic, which assigns a normalized rating out of 100 to reviews from mainstream publication, Laurel Hell received an average score of 83 out of 100, based on 27 reviews, indicating universal acclaim.

Paolo Ragusa at Consequence gave Laurel Hell a perfect score, describing it as the sound of "Mitski trusting herself, confidently blazing forward into the next decade of her storied career." Commenting on the hiatus Mitski took from music in the aftermath of her previous full-length Be the Cowboy, DIY's Ben Tipple said "That Laurel Hell exists only because it almost didn't gives it its power. It provides the space for her mastery of songwriting, and Patrick Hyland's understated yet orchestral production places Mitski in a realm all her own. She finds her voice in loss, an involuntary yet necessary response to throwing in the towel. But there's an ever-present tentative undercurrent, one that highlights the fragility of her return. The light at the end of the tunnel is flickering at best. You can't help but feel that it's all one broken brick away from tumbling down, which is exactly why it plays out with such delicate urgency."

In less favorable reviews, Steven Hyden of Uproxx described the LP as a "disappointment", saying that "Laurel Hell meanwhile is a tentative, frustrating record of half-measures trapped between musical worlds to which Mitski refuses to commit." Meanwhile, Gabrielle Sanchez of The A.V. Club said "The qualities that make Mitski great—her urgency, rawness, and stark ferocity—feel muted here". The song "The Only Heartbreaker" proved particularly divisive among critics. While David Smyth of the Evening Standard hailed it at as an "air-punching blast of Eighties-influenced synthpop" with hit potential, Pitchfork's Cat Zhang cited its production as having the "effect of anonymizing her, subsuming a first-class songwriter into a tired palette."

Year-end lists
Publication	List	Rank	Ref.
Albumism	The 100 Best Albums of 2022	28	
A.V. Club	The 25 Best Albums of 2022	Honorable Mention	
Clash	Clash's Albums of The Year	26	
Crack	Best Albums of 2022	43	
Esquire	The 25 Best Albums of 2022	N/A	
Exclaim!	Exclaim!'s 50 Best Albums of 2022	39	
The Forty-Five	Albums of the year 2022	4	
Gigwise	Gigwise's 51 Best Albums of 2022	10	
GQ	Best Albums of 2022	N/A	
NME	The 50 Best Albums of 2022	21	
Northern Transmission	Top 50 Albums of 2022	24	
ourculture	The 50 Best Albums of 2022	45	
Pitchfork	The 50 Best Albums of 2022	43	
Pitchfork	The 38 Best Rock Albums of 2022	N/A	
The Ringer	The 33 Best Albums of 2022	25	
Rolling Stone	The 100 Best Albums of 2022	60	
Slant Magazine	The 50 Best Albums of 2022	25	
Under the Radar	The 100 Best Albums of 2022	11	
Yardbarker	The 20 Best Indie Albums of 2022	N/A	

== Track listing ==
All tracks are written by Mitski, except where noted.

Laurel Hell track listing
No.	Title	Writer(s)	Length
1.	"Valentine, Texas"		2:35
2.	"Working for the Knife"		2:38
3.	"Stay Soft"		3:16
4.	"Everyone"		3:47
5.	"Heat Lightning"		2:51
6.	"The Only Heartbreaker"	Mitski; Dan Wilson	3:04
7.	"Love Me More"		3:32
8.	"There's Nothing Left for You"		2:52
9.	"Should've Been Me"		3:11
10.	"I Guess"		2:15
11.	"That's Our Lamp"		2:24
Total length:			32:25

Japanese edition bonus tracks
No.	Title	Writer(s)	Length
12.	"Glide"	Lily Chou-Chou	3:41
13.	"Valentine, Texas" (demo version)		2:49
Total length:			39:03

Rough Trade exclusive bonus tracks
No.	Title	Writer(s)	Length
12.	"Valentine, Texas" (demo version)		2:49
13.	"Love Me More" (demo version)
14.	"Stay Soft" (acoustic version)
15.	"Glide"	Lily Chou-Chou	3:41

Notes

- "There's Nothing Left for You" was initially released digitally with the title "There's Nothing Left Here for You"

== Personnel ==
- Mitski – keyboards, vocals
- Patrick Hyland – guitar, percussion, synthesizer; production, recording, mixing
- Elizabeth Chan – drums (tracks 3, 8, 9, 11)
- K. Marie Kim – additional keyboards (9, 11)
- Evan Marien – bass guitar (9, 11)
- Brooke Waggoner – piano (1, 3)
- Ted Jensen – mastering
- Ryan Smith – vinyl mastering
- Ebru Yildiz – photo
- Mary Banas – album design
- Corinne Ang – typeface "Resolve"

== Charts ==
Chart performance for Laurel Hell
Chart (2022)	Peak position
Australian Albums (ARIA)	7
Austrian Albums (Ö3 Austria)	47
Belgian Albums (Ultratop Flanders)	30
Belgian Albums (Ultratop Wallonia)	108
Canadian Albums (Billboard)	36
Dutch Albums (Album Top 100)	51
Finnish Albums (Suomen virallinen lista)	15
French Albums (SNEP)	173
German Albums (Offizielle Top 100)	28
Irish Albums (Official Charts)	7
Lithuanian Albums (AGATA)	37
New Zealand Albums (RMNZ)	14
Portuguese Albums (AFP)	23
Scottish Albums (Official Charts)	4
Spanish Albums (Promusicae)	41
Swiss Albums (Schweizer Hitparade)	91
UK Albums (Official Charts)	6
UK Independent Albums (Official Charts)	3
US Billboard 200	5
US Independent Albums (Billboard)	2
US Top Alternative Albums (Billboard)	1
US Top Rock Albums (Billboard)	1
