= Fireproof (One Direction song) =

Promotional single by One Direction

from the album Four
- Released: 8 September 2014
- Genre: Pop; soft rock
- Length: 2:54
- Label: Columbia; Syco
- Songwriters: Liam Payne; Louis Tomlinson; John Ryan; Jamie Scott; Julian Bunetta; Carolina Velert
- Producers: Bunetta; Ryan

"Fireproof" is a song by English–Irish boy band One Direction. The song was released on 8 September 2014, as the first promotional single from their fourth studio album, Four. The song was written by One Direction members, Liam Payne and Louis Tomlinson, along with John Ryan, Jamie Scott, Julian Bunetta and Carolina Velert. The track sold over 1.1 million downloads worldwide in 24 hours.

== Background and release ==
On 8 September 2014, the group announced that they would be releasing their fourth studio album, Four, on 17 November 2014. Along with this announcement, they released the song, "Fireproof" for free download for 24 hours. In a statement, Niall Horan said, "It's one of our favorite songs, so hopefully you are enjoying it! And can't wait for you to hear the rest of the album."

== Composition ==
"Fireproof" was written by Louis Tomlinson, Liam Payne, John Ryan, Jamie Scott, Julian Bunetta, and Carolina Velert, while production was handled by Bunetta and Ryan. According to the sheet music published at Musicnotes.com, by Alfred Music Publishing, the track runs at 132 BPM and is in the key of E-flat major. Bunetta told Billboard about "Fireproof" stating:

"I think that everybody felt like this was a nice, little change in pace. It's a nice breather and a nice sort of more sophisticated, artful way of making a pop song for kids from 8 to 80. Fans want to be challenged and they want to be led and taken to new places and hear things they haven't heard. And the boys definitely listen to the fans."

== Critical reception ==
"Fireproof" was met with mostly positive reviews from music critics. Joe Lynch of Billboard described the track as, "an easy-going pop song, eschewing the high-energy attack of 'Best Song Ever' or the Mumford-lite vibe of 'Story of My Life' in favor of a gentle (and extremely catchy) melody." Stitched Sound stated, "Side by side, 'Fireproof' has almost zero things in common with their very first single 'What Makes You Beautiful' [...] their voices and quality of writing are stronger than ever and it seems as though, One Direction's finally taking control of the music that release into the world." However, Alex Kritselis of Bustle gave a negative review of the song, calling the track, "boring, bland, and terrible." He felt that the song was a "Midnight Memories leftover," in which he added, "a song that nobody wanted or remembered." Fan reception of the song were positive, garnering 1.7 million tweets about the track, topping the Billboard Twitter Real-Time chart for eight hours. In 2025, it was listed as the 106th best song of the 21st century by Rolling Stone.

== Cover versions ==
In April 2015, American singer-songwriter Mitski released a cover of the track through Billboard. It was later added to the 10th anniversary deluxe edition of her 2016 album Puberty 2.

== Chart performance ==
In the span of 24-hours, "Fireproof" sold 1.1 million downloads worldwide, which broke the record for most downloaded song in a 24-hour period. The song also sold 3,723 copies in the UK. The song debuted at number 92 on the UK Singles Chart. The song also peaked at number two on the US Bubbling Under Hot 100 chart.

== Personnel ==
- John Ryan – producer, engineering, guitar, backing vocals
- Julian Bunetta – producer, engineering, drums, backing vocals
- Jamie Scott – guitar
- Carolina Velert – producer, general engineering, backing vocals
- Randy Merrill – assistant mastering engineer
- Benjamin Chang – vocal producer, recording engineer
- Alex Oriet – recording engineer
- Ash Howes – mixing (The Dark Room, London, United Kingdom)
- Tom Coyne – mastering (Sterling Sound, Nashville, Tennessee)
- Ian Franzino – assistant engineer

== Charts ==
Chart performance for "Fireproof"
Chart (2014)	Peak position
UK Singles (Official Charts)	92
US Bubbling Under Hot 100 (Billboard)	2

== Certifications ==
Region	Certification	Certified units/sales
United Kingdom (BPI)	Silver	200,000^{‡}
^{‡} Sales+streaming figures based on certification alone.
