= 18 (One Direction song) =

Promotional single by One Direction

from the album Four
- Released: 11 November 2014
- Recorded: 2014
- Length: 4:09
- Label: Syco; Columbia
- Songwriters: Oliver Frank; Ed Sheeran
- Producers: Sam Miller; Matt Rad; Steve Robson

"18" is a song by English-Irish boy band One Direction from their fourth studio album Four. The song was released on 17 November 2014 and was written by English singer Ed Sheeran and Oliver Frank. The song is certified gold in Australia and platinum in the United Kingdom.

== Background ==
The song was written by English singer Ed Sheeran whilst in a hotel bathroom in Denmark, and was then sent to One Direction. Sheeran spoke about writing the song for the band in an interview, saying he wrote it in their perspectives. He also mentioned that it was the first record he wrote specifically for the band. Described as an acoustic, guitar-based track, it runs at 124 BPM and is in the key of F♯ Minor. The song was recorded at Enemy Dojo, The Mountains, Los Angeles.

As of 2014, "18" sold 4,922 copies in the UK and 38,610 copies in the US. Billboard called the song the album's best ballad.

== Personnel ==
Credits for "18" adapted from Genius.

Musicians

One Direction

- Niall Horan – vocals
- Zayn Malik – vocals
- Liam Payne – vocals
- Harry Styles – vocals
- Louis Tomlinson – vocals

Additional musicians

- Oliver Frank – writing
- Luke Potashnick – guitar
- Matt Rad – drum programming, keyboard, producer
- Steve Robson – bass, producer
- Ed Sheeran – writing

Production

- Ian Dowling – engineering
- Șerban Ghenea – mixing
- John Hanes – mixing
- Sam Miller – engineering, producer

== Charts ==
Chart (2014)	Peak position
Austria (Ö3 Austria Top 40)	60
Canada Hot 100 (Billboard)	84
France (SNEP)	82
Ireland (IRMA)	84
Mexico Ingles Airplay (Billboard)	41
Scottish Singles Sales (Official Charts)	18
Spain (Promusicae)	38
Sweden (Sverigetopplistan)	46
UK Singles (Official Charts)	45
US Billboard Hot 100	87

== Certifications ==
Region	Certification	Certified units/sales
Australia (ARIA)	Gold	35,000^{‡}
Denmark (IFPI Danmark)	Gold	45,000^{‡}
Mexico (AMPROFON)	Platinum	60,000^{‡}
New Zealand (RMNZ)	Platinum	30,000^{‡}
Spain (Promusicae)	Gold	30,000^{‡}
United Kingdom (BPI)	Platinum	600,000^{‡}
^{‡} Sales+streaming figures based on certification alone.
