= Working for the Knife =

2021 song by Mitski

Single by Mitski

from the album Laurel Hell
- Released: October 5, 2021
- Genre: Rock; electro-industrial; synth-pop; glam rock; dream pop
- Length: 2:38
- Label: Dead Oceans
- Songwriter: Mitski Miyawaki
- Producer: Patrick Hyland

Mitski singles chronology
| "The End" (2021) | "Working for the Knife" (2021) | "The Only Heartbreaker" (2021) |

Music video
- "Working for the Knife" on YouTube

"Working for the Knife" is a song by American singer-songwriter Mitski. It was released on October 5, 2021, through Dead Oceans, making it her first major release since her hiatus following the release of her 2018 studio album Be the Cowboy, and her subsequent tour in 2019. Written by Mitski and produced by her longtime collaborator Patrick Hyland, it is a dark, midtempo rock, and electro-industrial song led by synths and percussion. Lyrically, it revolves around "the knife", a metaphor for the expectations placed on Mitski to continue laboring over her music.

Upon release, "Working for the Knife" received critical acclaim and peaked at number 27 on Billboard's Hot Rock & Alternative Songs chart. The song's Zia Anger-directed music video shows Mitski dancing around in The Egg, a performing venue in Albany, New York, before eventually going on stage, where she dances and writhes around in silence to an empty crowd.

== Background and release ==
"I sense that if I don't step away soon, my self-worth/identity will start depending too much on staying in the game, in the constant churn. I don't want to make art like that, especially when you're offering your valuable time and hearts and money to it."

— Mitski explaining her hiatus on Twitter.

Following the release of her critically acclaimed fifth studio album Be the Cowboy in 2018, Mitski announced in September 2019 that her performance in Central Park (with opening act Lucy Dacus) would be her "last show indefinitely", but that she would not be quitting music. She subsequently took down all of her social media accounts. During her hiatus, she was featured on Allie X's song "Susie Save Your Love" from her 2020 album Cape God, contributed to the song "Cop Car" for the 2020 film The Turning, and released the soundtrack for the 2021 graphic novel This is Where We Fall.

On October 4, 2021, her management posted teasers of a new song on social media, announcing that it would be released the following day. It was released on October 5, 2021, through Dead Oceans. Upon releasing the song, Mitski announced that she would be embarking on a 2022 tour throughout North America and Europe.

== Composition ==
"Working for the Knife" was written by Mitski and produced by Patrick Hyland, whom she has collaborated on every album since Bury Me at Makeout Creek. At around two and a half minutes long, it is a "bleary" and "dark" midtempo rock, electro-industrial, synth-pop, glam rock, and dream pop song with elements of Americana, shoegaze, country, and folk. Its "intricately textured" production is led by synths including a droning synth, a syncopated beat, and "clattering" percussion. The instrumentation also includes piano, a distorted electric guitar riff, acoustic guitar, and horns. In the song, Mitski uses "the knife" as a metaphor for the unattainable expectations placed on her, the inescapable systems that control her life, and the culture of working non-stop cultivated by capitalism. She sings about her anxiety about living her life in the public eye, feeling unfulfilled due to only working for "the knife", struggling not to give up on her creative aspirations, and being worried that no one will relate to her music.

Tatiana Tenreyno of The A.V. Club wrote that "Working for the Knife" represented Mitski's "darker side". Scott Russell of Paste compared the song to "Cat People (Putting Out Fire)" by David Bowie. Rolling Stone's Angie Martoccio considered the song a spiritual successor to Mitski's song "Blue Light" from Be the Cowboy, in which she sings, "Out there I'm a sharp knife/Are you that blue light?"

== Critical reception ==
Marissa Lorusso of NPR called "Working for the Knife" a "powerful entry" into the canon of Mitski's "most compelling songs", and wrote that it was "impressive, but, frankly, unsurprising" that Mitski could "transform a song about feeling hollow and adrift...into something transfixing and staggeringly alive". Clash's Robin Murray called it a "fantastic return" for Mitski and "a work of supreme confidence". The Fader's Jordan Darville called the song "a welcome return for Mitski's brand of ennui, compact and literary like a good short story". MTV News's Patrick Hosken wrote that "[Mitski's] power is on full display" in "Working for the Knife", and that she "sings with resolve" and that the lyrics were "extremely real, end-of-your-twenties kind of shit". Abby Jones of Consequence wrote that the song was a "strikingly relevant" critique of "hustle culture" that "offers piercing anecdotes about Mitski's own perceived shortcomings" and has "sweeping, roaring instrumentals".

Writing for the New Statesman, Ellen Peirson-Hagger called it "a powerful, taut ballad that examines how it feels to live in a world that sucks the humanity out of you at every turn", and described her voice on the song as "rich" and "mesmerising". Writing for Slate, Shasha Léonard described the song as "understated", calling its "relative subtlety" "purposeful and powerful" and "emblematic of what continues to lead some listeners to revisit and fall in love with tracks of hers they may have initially dismissed". Vogue's Emma Specter stated that the song "definitely capture[s] some of the surreality and loneliness that so many of us have felt" during the pandemic, also writing that it "combines [Mitski's] signature mix of lyrical alienation and hope". For Gigwise, Jessie Atkinson called it "grand and spectacularly produced", describing Mitski's vocals as "gorgeous" and her songwriting as "sad but smart". Tatiana Tenreyno of The A.V. Club remarked that, while the song's lyrics were simpler than her "lyrical gut-punches from throughout the years", they "tell so much", and called the song "terrific". Tom Breihan of Stereogum wrote that it "works as oblique glam-rock" and "gives cinematic grandeur" to her anxiety, while Jon Pareles of The New York Times wrote that the song's production "expands into ever-wider spaces. Rolling Stone's Angie Martoccio wrote that Mitski was "sharper and wiser than ever" on the song, adding that it "arrives with the kind of energy that tosses you back in your scarlet theater seat and keeps you nervously eating popcorn".

=== Rankings ===
Critical rankings for "Working for the Knife"
| Publication | Accolade | Rank | Ref. |
|---|---|---|---|
| Pitchfork | The 100 Best Songs of 2021 | 7 | |
| Pitchfork | The 100 Best Songs of the 2020s So Far | 39 | |
| NPR Music | The 100 Best Songs of 2021 | 17 | |

== Music video ==
The five-minute-long music video for "Working for the Knife" was directed by Zia Anger, with Ashley Connor as its director of photography. It was filmed in The Egg in Albany, New York.

=== Synopsis ===
The video begins with a dark, shaky camera shot of Mitski and the sound of heels on concrete. She then enters The Egg on an elevator, wearing a black leather trench coat and a cowboy hat, before taking the hat and trench coat off, underneath which she is wearing a blue silk outfit. She then wanders around the venue alone and does a modern dance routine, which includes her licking a staircase and making exaggerated facial expressions. At the end of the video, after the song ends, Mitski goes on stage and collapses, then thrashes and dances around on stage to an empty crowd in a routine inspired by butoh, at first set to simulated applause and then to silence.

=== Reception ===
Pitchfork's Eric Torres named "Working for the Knife" the best music video of October 2021, writing that her "forcefulness" was "cathartic" and "reveals the intense loneliness that comes with putting your whole self out in front of an audience that’s all too eager to consume every moment". The Fader's Jordan Darville compared the video to that of Fatboy Slim's song "Weapon of Choice", but writing that it had "more emotional depth". Slate's Shasha Léonard described the video as "haunting, disconcerting, and 100 percent [Mitski]". NPR's Marissa Lorusso wrote that, in the video, Mitski's presence "is both startling and magnetic – particularly in the video's final minute". Rolling Stone's Angie Martoccio referred to the video as "a strangely compelling short film starring a reluctant performer returning to the spotlight". Variety's Ellise Shafer wrote that "tell[s] the story of an artist exploiting her deepest emotions for the entertainment of others". Kate Brayden of Hot Press described the video as "gritty and beautifully intense", and wrote that Mitski's "dedication to both sonic and physical presentation is on full display". Under the Radar's Mark Redfern called the video "dramatic".

== Charts ==
Chart performance for "Working for the Knife"
| Chart (2021) | Peak position |
|---|---|
| New Zealand Hot Singles (RMNZ) | 21 |
| US Hot Rock & Alternative Songs (Billboard) | 27 |
