= Night Changes =

Single by One Direction

from the album Four
- Released: 14 November 2014
- Recorded: 2014
- Length: 3:47 (album version) 4:01 (video version)
- Label: Syco; Columbia
- Songwriters: Jamie Scott; Julian Bunetta; John Ryan; Niall Horan; Zayn Malik; Harry Styles; Liam Payne; Louis Tomlinson
- Producers: Bunetta; Ryan; Jamie Scott

One Direction singles chronology
| "Steal My Girl" (2014) | "Night Changes" (2014) | "Drag Me Down" (2015) |

Music video
- "Night Changes" on YouTube

"Night Changes" is a song recorded by English-Irish boy band One Direction. It was written by the band alongside Jamie Scott, Julian Bunetta, and John Ryan, while the production was handled by Bunetta and Ryan. The song was released on 14 November 2014 as the second and final single from their fourth studio album Four. It also marked their last single with member Zayn Malik.

== Background and release ==
"Night Changes" was revealed as the album's second single in an interview with radio host Scott Mills. The track was released on 14 November 2014, three days before the album's release.

== Composition and lyrics ==
Developing on the themes of "Live While We're Young" and "Story of My Life", the song explores the rapid passage of time, seizing the moment in life, and gaining love along the way. The harmonies in the chorus, backed by rounds of "Oohs", give the song added depth and a "big contemplative feel." The song runs for 3 minutes and 47 seconds and begins in the key of A♭ major; 2 minutes and 28 seconds into the song, the key changes to B♭ major.

== Music video ==
The official music video was released on 21 November 2014 and directed by Ben Winston. This was One Direction's last video with Zayn Malik, as he departed from the band on 25 March 2015. Liam Payne's real-life girlfriend Sophia Smith was involved in the shoot, but did not appear on-screen.

The video is a point of view of going on a date with all 5 members of One Direction. The five dates take place in five different locations: a date with Zayn Malik at a restaurant (which he appears to own as he greets some chefs and introduces his date to a waiter), a drive with Louis Tomlinson in his vintage car, a night in playing Monopoly and Jenga with Niall Horan at his house next to a fireplace, ice skating with Harry Styles and at a funfair with Liam Payne.

As their dates progress, things end up going horribly wrong for all 5 members. Zayn's date's ex-boyfriend comes in, yells at her, then dumps water and spaghetti on Zayn, which prompts the date to leave Zayn as he looks on in disbelief. Harry spots another couple doing a very complicated trick on the ice rink and attempts to do it with his date, causing both of them to fall and get injured. Liam takes his date on the Waltzer at the funfair, but becomes nauseated while on the ride and proceeds to vomit in his date's hat as they exit. Niall tends to his fireplace, but the sleeve of his shirt catches fire and he grabs a towel to put out the fire, which accidentally tips over a jug that spills the contents on his date's dress. Louis gets pulled over by the police presumably for speeding and tries to joke with the policeman to impress his date, which results in him getting arrested, and the date watches as Louis is driven away from her in the back of the police car.

== Commercial performance ==
A moderate commercial success, the track is one of the band's most critically acclaimed, receiving praise for contemplating the fleeting nature of life with depth and maturity. As of October 2024, "Night Changes" is the most-streamed song by the band on Spotify, with over 2 billion streams.

Following the death of Liam Payne in October 2024, the song saw a surge in sales and streams, rising to 6th place on Spotify's daily global song chart, and the Official Charts Company showed "Night Changes" place at number 16 on the UK Midweek Singles Chart. It re-entered the UK Singles Chart Top 100, on 25 October 2024, at a new peak of number 6.

== Track listing ==
- Digital EP
1. "Night Changes" (Afterhrs Remix) – 3:40
2. "Night Changes" (live acoustic session) – 3:40
3. "Steal My Girl" (live acoustic session) – 3:46
- CD single
1. "Night Changes" (Afterhrs Remix) – 3:40
2. "Night Changes" (live acoustic session) – 3:40
- Music Video
1. "Night Changes" - 4:00

== Charts ==
=== Weekly charts ===
2014–2015 weekly chart performance for "Night Changes"
| Chart (2014–2015) | Peak position |
|---|---|
| Australia (ARIA) | 33 |
| Austria (Ö3 Austria Top 40) | 42 |
| Belgium (Ultratip Bubbling Under Flanders) | 1 |
| Belgium (Ultratip Bubbling Under Wallonia) | 4 |
| Canada Hot 100 (Billboard) | 20 |
| Czech Republic Singles Digital (ČNS IFPI) | 19 |
| Euro Digital Song Sales (Billboard) | 8 |
| France (SNEP) | 106 |
| Germany (GfK) | 79 |
| Hungary (Stream Top 40) | 33 |
| Ireland (IRMA) | 13 |
| Italy (FIMI) | 32 |
| Japan Hot 100 (Billboard) | 97 |
| Mexico (Billboard Ingles Airplay) | 13 |
| Netherlands (Single Top 100) | 76 |
| New Zealand (Recorded Music NZ) | 11 |
| Slovakia Singles Digital (ČNS IFPI) | 22 |
| Slovakia Airplay (ČNS IFPI) | 47 |
| Spain (Promusicae) | 22 |
| Sweden (Sverigetopplistan) | 40 |
| Switzerland (Schweizer Hitparade) | 46 |
| UK Singles (Official Charts) | 7 |
| US Billboard Hot 100 | 31 |
| US Adult Contemporary (Billboard) | 22 |
| US Adult Pop Airplay (Billboard) | 13 |
| US Pop Airplay (Billboard) | 14 |

2022–2025 weekly chart performance for "Night Changes"
| Chart (2022–2025) | Peak position |
|---|---|
| Australia (ARIA) | 19 |
| Austria (Ö3 Austria Top 40) | 48 |
| Canada Hot 100 (Billboard) | 33 |
| Denmark (Tracklisten) | 24 |
| Global 200 (Billboard) | 18 |
| Greece International (IFPI) | 19 |
| India International (IMI) | 2 |
| Indonesia (ASIRI) | 48 |
| Indonesia (Billboard) | 17 |
| Ireland (IRMA) | 4 |
| Italy (FIMI) | 76 |
| Malaysia (Billboard) | 19 |
| Malaysia International (RIM) | 6 |
| Netherlands (Single Top 100) | 48 |
| New Zealand (Recorded Music NZ) | 17 |
| Norway (VG-lista) | 23 |
| Philippines (Philippines Hot 100) | 15 |
| Portugal (AFP) | 34 |
| Singapore (RIAS) | 10 |
| Spain (Promusicae) | 95 |
| Sweden (Sverigetopplistan) | 19 |
| Switzerland (Schweizer Hitparade) | 49 |
| UK Singles (Official Charts) | 6 |
| US Digital Song Sales (Billboard) | 14 |

=== Year-end charts ===
Year-end chart performance for "Night Changes"
| Chart (2015) | Position |
|---|---|
| US Billboard Hot 100 | 98 |
| US Mainstream Top 40 (Billboard) | 50 |

| Chart (2024) | Peak position |
|---|---|
| India International (IMI) | 5 |
| Philippines (Philippines Hot 100) | 61 |

== Certifications ==
Certifications for "Night Changes"
| Region | Certification | Certified units/sales |
|---|---|---|
| Australia (ARIA) | 6× Platinum | 420,000^{‡} |
| Canada (Music Canada) | Platinum | 80,000^{‡} |
| Denmark (IFPI Danmark) | 2× Platinum | 180,000^{‡} |
| Germany (BVMI) | Gold | 300,000^{‡} |
| Italy (FIMI) | Platinum | 100,000^{‡} |
| Mexico (AMPROFON) | Platinum | 60,000^{‡} |
| New Zealand (RMNZ) | 4× Platinum | 120,000^{‡} |
| Spain (Promusicae) | Platinum | 60,000^{‡} |
| United Kingdom (BPI) | 3× Platinum | 1,800,000^{‡} |
| United States (RIAA) | Platinum | 1,010,000 |
Streaming
| Greece (IFPI Greece) | Platinum | 2,000,000^{†} |
^{‡} Sales+streaming figures based on certification alone.^{†} Streaming-only figures based on certification alone.
