= Steal My Girl =

Single by One Direction

from the album Four
- Released: 29 September 2014
- Recorded: 2014
- Genre: Pop rock
- Length: 3:48
- Label: Syco; Columbia
- Songwriters: Wayne Hector; John Ryan; Ed Drewett; Julian Bunetta; Louis Tomlinson; Liam Payne
- Producers: Julian Bunetta; John Ryan; Pär Westerlund

One Direction singles chronology
"You & I" (2014)	"Steal My Girl" (2014)	"Night Changes" (2014)

Music video
- "Steal My Girl" on YouTube

“Steal My Girl” is a song written and recorded by English-Irish boy band One Direction. It is the lead single from their fourth studio album Four (2014). It was released worldwide on 29 September 2014. The single was written by band members Louis Tomlinson and Liam Payne and regular collaborators Wayne Hector, John Ryan, Ed Drewett, and Julian Bunetta. It was produced by Bunetta, Ryan and Pär Westerlund.

== Background and release ==
On 14 September 2014, Payne tweeted the upcoming release of the song. On 28 September, one day before its official release, the song was leaked on the internet. The single became available worldwide on 29 September, except in the United Kingdom, where it was released on 12 October with a b-side of Payne's remix of the recording, called the Big Payno and Afterhrs Pool Party Remix. The song's co-writer Louis Tomlinson said the single was a "feel-good song and it’s not too far away from the last album"—Midnight Memories.

== Composition and lyrics ==
The song has a piano part similar to that of Journey's "Faithfully". One reviewer found the song reminiscent of 1980s music, like their previous studio album. The lyrics fret over the potential for rivals to take the group's girlfriends away from them, and why they matter to them. Sheet music for the song "Steal My Girl" was in the key of B major (performed in B♭ major) with a tempo of 78 beats per minute.

== Critical reception ==
The song received acclaim from music critics. Lucas Villa of AXS praised One Direction's classic rock sound of "Steal My Girl", noting similarities to Journey's "Faithfully". He wrote that "the guys have been digging in their parents' record collections" and calling the song "a pretty neat and new direction for the band." Samantha Highfill of Entertainment Weekly suggests that the song is "dad-friendly", emphasizing the classic rock sound. Billboard gave the song four and a half out of five stars, stating it "represents the group's most tremendous Van Halen impression yet." Jim Farber from the Daily News called it a throwback to the 1970s/80s' arena-rock ballad.

Jim Farber wrote in the New York Daily News that the song "boasts a sumptuous production and a chorus guaranteed to make young girls around the world swoon," adding that it "boasts a melody that sounds like it could have come off a '70s or '80s arena-rock ballad by Journey or Foreigner. The warmly synthesized arrangement also echos the style of that particular era of homogenized pop". Christina Lee of Idolator wrote that "the song is clearly a hit" that "morphs into a soaring stadium pop anthem with hard-hitting drum machine beats, glassy piano chords and that playground chant of a hook". Mikael Wood of The Baltimore Sun wrote that "One Direction is going dad rock" and that the song is a "journey to the '80s".

Hayley Williams and Chad Gilbert noted similarities to New Found Glory's "It's Not Your Fault".

== Chart performance ==
"Steal My Girl" reached number three on the UK Singles Chart, the group's eighth song to reach three or higher. "Steal My Girl" reached number 13 on the US Billboard Hot 100.

== Music video ==
The accompanying music video was directed by Ben and Gabe Turner. The clip featured Danny DeVito, a juvenile chimpanzee, sumo wrestlers Yamamotoyama Ryūta and Ulambayaryn Byambajav, acrobats and a marching band. Also in the video appears Julie Zetlin, a retired rhythmic gymnast from the United States wearing a leotard previously worn by Belarusian rhythmic gymnast Inna Zhukova.

In the music video, DeVito meets up with the group in the middle of the desert where a video shoot is being set up, serving as their visionary director. He dubs each of the members of the group a different expression: Harry is love, Niall is light, Liam is power, Louis is danger, and Zayn is mystery. The song starts with Liam smashing a row of silver balls that spell "inhibitions" and Zayn is seen with two sumo wrestlers. Niall is seen dancing with a Maasai tribe from Tanzania, and Liam is seen as a leader of a marching band. Harry is seen surrounded by masked female ballet dancers, and Louis is seen with the chimpanzee, as well as a lion, a flock of sheep and flamingos. DeVito appears with the group throughout the video. In the end, a rain effect is used on the lot, where the group, DeVito, and all other acts appear together in one shot resembling a mix of Cirque du Soleil and Coachella.

== Track listing ==
- Digital download
1. "Steal My Girl"
- UK digital download
1. "Steal My Girl"
2. "Steal My Girl" (Big Payno and Afterhrs Pool Party remix)
- CD single
1. "Steal My Girl"
2. "Steal My Girl" (acoustic version)

== Charts ==
=== Weekly charts ===
Chart (2014–15)	Peak position
Australia (ARIA)	9
Austria (Ö3 Austria Top 40)	14
Belgium (Ultratop 50 Flanders)	15
Belgium (Ultratop 50 Wallonia)	20
Canada Hot 100 (Billboard)	14
Czech Republic Airplay (ČNS IFPI)	14
Czech Republic Singles Digital (ČNS IFPI)	8
Denmark (Tracklisten)	1
Euro Digital Song Sales (Billboard)	5
Finland (Suomen virallinen lista)	17
France (SNEP)	19
Germany (GfK)	27
Greece Digital Songs (Billboard)	1
Hungary (Single Top 40)	20
Ireland (IRMA)	3
Italy (FIMI)	15
Japan Hot 100 (Billboard)	14
Lebanon (The Official Lebanese Top 20)	5
Mexico (Billboard Mexican Airplay)	4
Netherlands (Dutch Top 40)	30
Netherlands (Single Top 100)	31
New Zealand (Recorded Music NZ)	9
Norway (VG-lista)	33
Portugal Digital Song Sales (Billboard)	8
Scottish Singles Sales (Official Charts)	2
Slovakia Airplay (ČNS IFPI)	28
Slovakia Singles Digital (ČNS IFPI)	10
Slovenia (SloTop50)	34
South Africa Airplay (EMA)	5
South Korea International Chart (GAON)	42
Spain (Promusicae)	7
Sweden (Sverigetopplistan)	19
Switzerland (Schweizer Hitparade)	21
UK Singles (Official Charts)	3
UK Airplay (Music Week)	16
US Billboard Hot 100	13
US Adult Pop Airplay (Billboard)	37
US Pop Airplay (Billboard)	17

2024 weekly chart performance for "Steal My Girl"
Chart (2024)	Peak position
Global 200 (Billboard)	140
Philippines (Philippines Hot 100)	75

=== Year-end charts ===
Chart (2014)	Position
Australia (ARIA)	77
Japan Adult Contemporary (Billboard)	29
Netherlands (Single Top 100)	99
Taiwan (Hito Radio)	63
UK Singles (Official Charts Company)	43

== Certifications ==
Region	Certification	Certified units/sales
Australia (ARIA)	3× Platinum	210,000^{‡}
Canada (Music Canada)	Platinum	80,000^{*}
Denmark (IFPI Danmark)	Platinum	90,000^{‡}
Germany (BVMI)	Gold	200,000^{‡}
Italy (FIMI)	Gold	15,000^{‡}
Mexico (AMPROFON)	2× Platinum	120,000^{‡}
New Zealand (RMNZ)	3× Platinum	90,000^{‡}
Spain (Promusicae)	Gold	30,000^{‡}
United Kingdom (BPI)	2× Platinum	1,200,000^{‡}
United States (RIAA)	Gold	500,000^{‡}
^{*} Sales figures based on certification alone.^{‡} Sales+streaming figures based on certification alone.

== Release history ==
Region	Date	Format	Label	Ref.
Worldwide	29 September 2014	Digital download	Columbia; Syco	
United States	30 September 2014	Mainstream airplay	Columbia; Syco	
United Kingdom	12 October 2014	Digital download	Columbia; Syco	
United Kingdom	13 October 2014	CD	Columbia; Syco	
Germany	17 October 2014	CD	Columbia; Syco	

== Other versions ==
Canadian country music artist Jade Eagleson recorded a cover of "Steal My Girl" for his 2023 album Do It Anyway.
