= The Only Heartbreaker =

2021 song by Mitski

Single by Mitski

from the album Laurel Hell
- Released: November 9, 2021
- Genre: Synth-pop
- Length: 3:04
- Label: Dead Oceans
- Songwriter(s): Mitski, Dan Wilson
- Producer(s): Patrick Hyland

Mitski singles chronology
"Working for the Knife" (2021)	"The Only Heartbreaker" (2021)	"Heat Lightning" (2021)

Music video
- "The Only Heartbreaker" on YouTube

"The Only Heartbreaker" is a song by American singer Mitski, released on November 9, 2021 as the second single from her sixth studio album, Laurel Hell. The song was written by Mitski and Dan Wilson. The single became Mitski's first to reach number 1 on the charts, reaching that spot on the US AAA chart.

== Background ==
Mitski said that "The Only Heartbreaker" is about "the person always messing up in the relationship, the designated Bad Guy who gets the blame. It could simply be about that, but I also wanted to depict something sadder beneath the surface, that maybe the reason you're always the one making mistakes is because you're the only one trying."

About writing the song with Dan Wilson, she said:

This is the first song in my entire discography of however many albums I've made where I have a co-writer, and it's because this song was this puzzle that I couldn't solve. And I was just sitting on it forever. I have so many iterations of it. Nothing felt right. And right when I was stewing over it, I was actually in LA, doing co-write sessions for other artists. And we had this one day, or I had this one day with Dan Wilson. I had every intention to write for somebody else, but then I just sat down at his piano, and I was like, he's one of the best, smartest songwriters in the world. Maybe he can help me with this song. And so I brought the song to him, and it turned out he's really good. He helped me solve so many of the problems and kind of lead me out of the labyrinth of it. And yeah, I'm really glad that I took that chance with him.

Sue Park of Pitchfork wrote that the song "veers away from subdued indie rock and into full-fledged frenzy, recalling the exuberant synth-pop of the 1980s as Mitski implicates herself in the inevitable unraveling of a toxic relationship".

== Music video ==
A music video for "The Only Heartbreaker" was released on the same day as the single, directed by Maegan Houang and Jeff Desom. According to Uproxx, the video shows Mitski dancing through a forest and reeling in despair as she realizes that she's unintentionally killing everything she comes into contact with.

== Reception ==
AllMusic critic Marcy Donelson considered the song to be a highlight on Laurel Hell.

Former US president Barack Obama included "The Only Heartbreaker" in his list of top songs of 2021, a list he tweets out every year.

== Charts ==
Chart performance for "The Only Heartbreaker"
Chart (2021–2022)	Peak position
Iceland (RÚV)	4
Mexico Ingles Airplay (Billboard)	25
US Hot Rock & Alternative Songs (Billboard)	34
US Rock Airplay (Billboard)	20
