= Be the Cowboy =

Studio album by Mitski
- Released: August 17, 2018
- Studios: Retro City, Philadelphia; Gradwell House, Haddon Heights; Red Bull, Los Angeles
- Genres: Pop; art pop; indie rock
- Length: 32:28
- Label: Dead Oceans
- Producer: Patrick Hyland

Mitski chronology
Puberty 2 (2016)	Be the Cowboy (2018)	Laurel Hell (2022)

Singles from Be the Cowboy
- 1. "Geyser" Released: May 14, 2018; 2. "Nobody" Released: June 26, 2018; 3. "Two Slow Dancers" Released: August 9, 2018

Be the Cowboy is the fifth studio album by American musician and singer-songwriter Mitski, released on August 17, 2018, through Dead Oceans. Produced by longtime collaborator Patrick Hyland, the album widens Mitski's palette with a return to the piano featured on her first two records alongside synthesizers, horns and the guitar that became her signature instrument. Upon its release, Be the Cowboy received widespread acclaim from music critics, who later ranked it among the best albums of 2018. It was preceded by the singles "Geyser", "Nobody", and "Two Slow Dancers". Be the Cowboy was Mitski's first album to chart on the Billboard 200, and also entered the charts in Canada, Ireland, and the United Kingdom.

== Writing and recording ==
In a statement, Mitski said she experimented in narrative and fiction for the album, and said she was inspired by "the image of someone alone on a stage, singing solo with a single spotlight trained on them in an otherwise dark room." She recorded the album with longtime producer Patrick Hyland, and stated that "for most of the tracks, we didn't layer the vocals with doubles or harmonies, to achieve that campy 'person singing alone on stage' atmosphere." She also said the album is about her reconnecting with her feelings: "I had been on the road for a long time, which is so isolating, and had to run my own business at the same time. A lot of this record was me not having any feelings, being completely spent but then trying to rally myself and wake up and get back to Mitski."

== Composition ==
Be The Cowboy has been characterized as a "genre-defying" pop, pop-punk, indie rock, art pop, electrowave, disco, and alt-pop record, with elements of rock, chamber pop, funk, synth-pop, punk, techno-surf, country rock, and Eurodisco.

== Release and promotion ==
The album was made available for pre-order on May 14, 2018, without prior announcement. "Geyser" was released as the lead single from the album on the same day along with a music video directed by Zia Anger, who also directed the music video for "Your Best American Girl" from Puberty 2 (2016). The song was previously performed in 2014 on WNYU Radio and Hampshire College. On June 26, Mitski released "Nobody" as the second single alongside a music video directed by Christopher Good which was shot over five days in Kansas City. The third and final single to precede the album, "Two Slow Dancers", was released on August 9.

In support of the album, Mitski embarked on a tour including North American and European legs called Be the Cowboy Tour.

== Critical reception ==
Professional ratings
Aggregate scores
Source	Rating
AnyDecentMusic?	8.3/10
Metacritic	87/100
Review scores
Source	Rating
AllMusic	4.5/5 stars
The A.V. Club	A−
The Guardian	5/5 stars
Mojo	4/5 stars
NME	4/5 stars
Pitchfork	8.8/10
Q	4/5 stars
Rolling Stone	4/5 stars
The Times	4/5 stars
Vice (Expert Witness)	A−

At Metacritic, which assigns a normalized rating out of 100 to reviews from mainstream publications, Be the Cowboy received an average score of 87, based on 30 reviews, indicating "universal acclaim". Critics praised Mitski's ability to deftly move from the personal lyrics on her previous album Puberty 2 to more conceptual themes. AllMusic writer Marcy Donelson stated that "rather than being a disappointment, Be the Cowboy's point of view provides a brilliant twist, one that channels all the unease, unpredictability, and intuitiveness of Mitski's previous work—even for those who don't take in the lyrics." Laura Snapes similarly commended the album in a review for The Guardian; "Mitski's songwriting trademarks are strong enough to transcend the stylistic revamp – arrangements that are rich without being precious (Pink in the Night), plus her terrifically mordant worldview."

Pitchfork's Quinn Moreland called the album Mitski's greatest to date, stating that "she's never sounded so large, even in the record's quietest moments." Rolling Stone's Will Hermes wrote, "There may be nothing explicitly political in the songs on Be the Cowboy. But there's plenty implicit, from the DIY American mythology of the title, to the way the songs validate voices that are shaky, hurting, irrational, and damaged, while also being smart, wry, powerful, and deserving of love." The A.V. Club critic Katie Rife said, "Although Be The Cowboy sees Mitski fully transformed from her lo-fi beginnings in terms of production, her post-Pixies guitar-rock tendencies still come through strong, albeit now more lush and kaleidoscopic than buzzing and raucous." Sarah Murphy from Exclaim! applauded the album, saying "The album is all the more impressive because her words and music are meticulously calculated, expertly arranged and still filled with feeling."

=== Accolades ===
Year-end lists
Publication	Accolade	Rank	Ref.
Billboard	50 Best Albums of 2018	11	
Consequence of Sound	The Top 50 Albums of 2018	1	
Entertainment Weekly	20 Best Albums of 2018	4	
Flavorwire	The 25 Best Albums of 2018	12	
Flood Magazine	The Best Albums of 2018	1	
Fopp	100 Best Albums of 2018	46	
The Independent	The 40 Best Albums of 2018	24	
The Line of Best Fit	The Best Albums of 2018	1	
The New York Times	The 28 Best Albums of 2018	2	
Noisey	The 100 Best Albums of 2018	34	
Now	The 10 Best Albums of 2018	5	
NPR	The 50 Best Albums of 2018	2	
Paste	The 50 Best Albums of 2018	6	
Pitchfork	The 50 Best Albums of 2018	1	
Pitchfork	The 200 Best Albums of the 2010s	64	
Refinery29	The 10 Best Albums of 2018	8	
The Skinny	Top 50 Albums of 2018	3	
Slant Magazine	The 25 Best Albums of 2018	7	
Stereogum	The 50 Best Albums of 2018	10	
Time	The 10 Best Albums of 2018	3	
Uproxx	The 50 Best Albums of 2018	39	
Vulture	The 15 Best Albums of 2018	1	
The Village Voice	Pazz & Jop: The Top 100 Albums of 2018	3	
The Guardian	The 50 best albums of 2018	5	
Rolling Stone	50 Best Albums of 2018	14	

Award nominations
Year	Awards	Category	Result	Ref.
2019	Grammy Award	Best Recording Package	Nominated	
2019	Libera Awards	Album of the Year	Nominated	
2019	Libera Awards	Best Rock Album	Nominated	
2019	Libera Awards	Creative Packaging	Nominated	

== Track listing ==
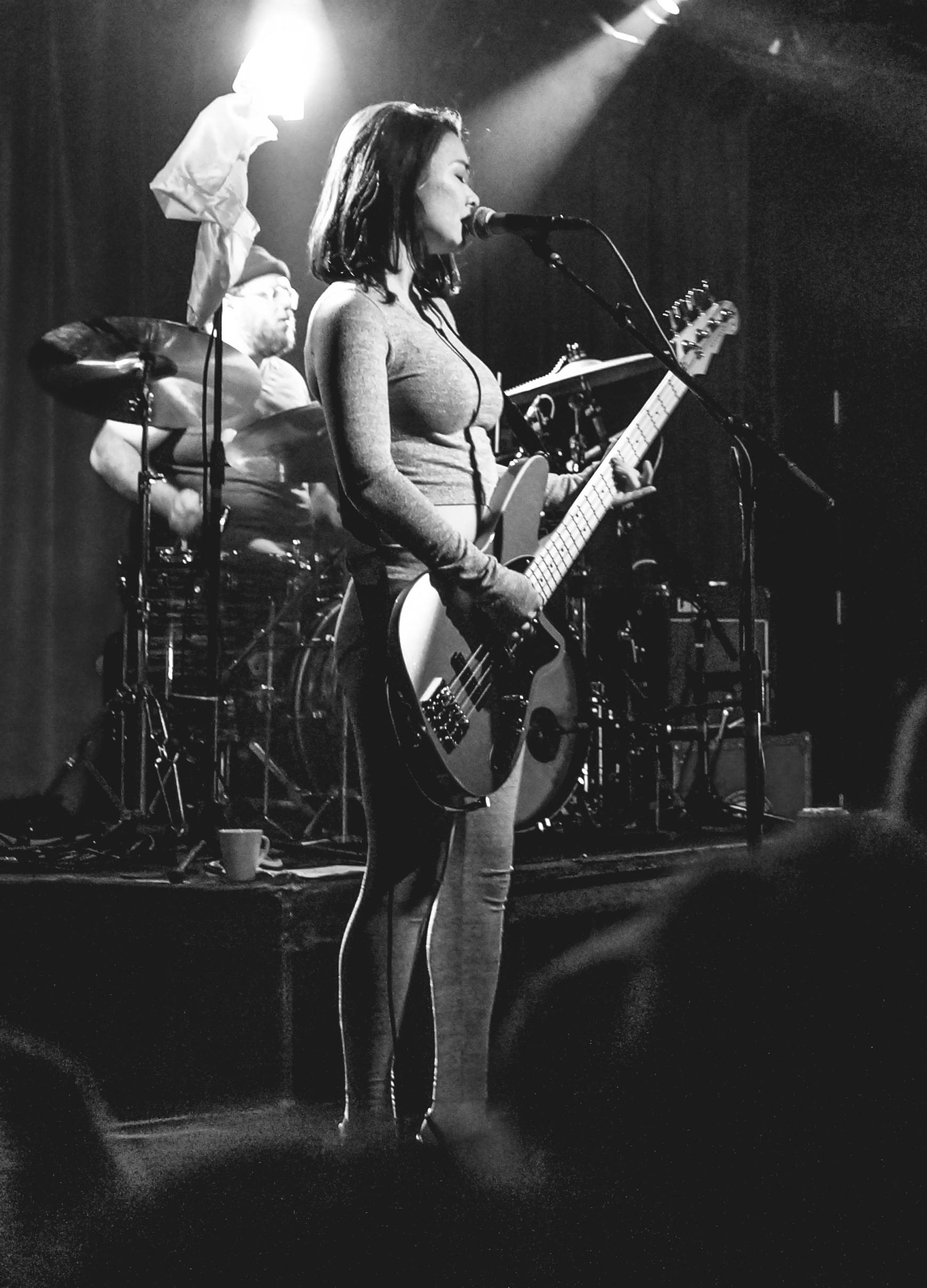
For Be the Cowboy, Mitski was inspired by "the image of someone alone on a stage, singing solo with a single spotlight trained on them in an otherwise dark room."

All tracks are written by Mitski Miyawaki.

Be the Cowboy track listing
No.	Title	Length
1.	"Geyser"	2:23
2.	"Why Didn't You Stop Me?"	2:21
3.	"Old Friend"	1:52
4.	"A Pearl"	2:36
5.	"Lonesome Love"	1:50
6.	"Remember My Name"	2:15
7.	"Me and My Husband"	2:17
8.	"Come into the Water"	1:32
9.	"Nobody"	3:13
10.	"Pink in the Night"	2:16
11.	"A Horse Named Cold Air"	2:03
12.	"Washing Machine Heart"	2:08
13.	"Blue Light"	1:43
14.	"Two Slow Dancers"	3:59
Total length:		32:28

== Personnel ==
Credits adapted from the liner notes of Be the Cowboy.

- Mitski – performance
- Patrick Hyland – performance, saxophone solo (on "Remember My Name")
- Philly Phatness – horns (except saxophone solo on "Remember My Name")
  - Thor Espanez
  - Ian Gray
  - Vince Tampio
- Evan Marien – bass (on "Nobody")
- Ted Jensen – mastering
- Ryan Smith – lacquer cutting
- Mary Banas – album design
- Bao Ngo – photography
- Carl Knight – lighting
- Annika White – styling
- Marika Aoki – makeup

== Charts ==
=== Weekly charts ===
Weekly chart performance for Be the Cowboy
Chart (2018–2021)	Peak position
Australia (ARIA Hitseekers)	4
Belgian Albums (Ultratop Flanders)	187
Canadian Albums (Billboard)	99
Irish Albums (IRMA)	56
Lithuanian Albums (AGATA)	29
Scottish Albums (Official Charts)	40
UK Albums (Official Charts)	64
UK Independent Albums (Official Charts)	9
US Billboard 200	52
US Independent Albums (Billboard)	3
US Top Alternative Albums (Billboard)	6
US Top Rock Albums (Billboard)	7

=== Year-end charts ===
Year-end chart performance for Be the Cowboy
Chart (2022)	Position
Lithuanian Albums (AGATA)	67

== Certifications ==
Certifications for Be the Cowboy
Region	Certification	Certified units/sales
New Zealand (RMNZ)	Gold	7,500^{‡}
United Kingdom (BPI)	Gold	100,000^{‡}
United States (RIAA)	Platinum	1,000,000^{‡}
^{‡} Sales+streaming figures based on certification alone.

== Release history ==
Region	Date	Label	Format	Ref.
Various	August 16, 2018	Dead Oceans	LP; CD	
Various	August 17, 2018	Dead Oceans	Digital download	
