= Washing Machine Heart =

Song by Mitski

from the album Be the Cowboy
- Released: August 17, 2018
- Genre: Synth-pop; indie pop; synth rock; new wave
- Length: 2:08
- Label: Dead Oceans
- Songwriter: Mitski
- Producer: Patrick Hyland

Music video
- "Washing Machine Heart" on YouTube

"Washing Machine Heart" is a song by American singer Mitski, released in 2018 on her album Be the Cowboy. Although not released as a single, it is one of her most famous songs. The song peaked at number 93 on the Irish Singles Chart as well as number 26 on the UK Indie charts. The A.V. Club writer Katie Rife described "Washing Machine Heart" as a "deranged domestic ballad with a pleasantly disorienting beat".

== Background ==
AllMusic critic Marcy Donelson wrote, "stomping, clapping, and relentless keyboard bleeps permeate the brutal, danceable 'Washing Machine Heart', evoking the appliance as well as the wife's frustration ('I'm not wearing my usual lipstick/I thought maybe we would kiss tonight')."

Rolling Stone writer Simon Vozick-Levinson said "It's two minutes long, but it has at least three distinct musical ideas within it. First there's the percussive, almost industrial opening section; then, after 30 seconds, a sweeter synth-pop doodle; and finally, at around 1:10, the knockout punch. 'Do, mi, ti/Why not me?' Mitski sings, repeating the solfege syllables as if trying to will them into making sense."

In an episode of the BBC 6 Music's Artist in Residence: AAA, Mitski's producer Patrick Hyland states that the song was originally not going to be included on its album Be the Cowboy. Mitski also said that the lyric "Do, mi, ti" was a failed attempt at including "Mi, So" in an effort to include miso soup into the song.

The song is in F-sharp minor (11B Camelot) with a BPM of 106.

== Music video ==
A black and white music video for the song was released on November 1, 2018, directed by Zia Anger. Mitski credited Tidal with giving her the chance to make the video, and noted that the creative team was made up of her frequent collaborators. Anger also directed the music videos for Mitski's songs "Your Best American Girl" and "Geyser". Spin writer Maggie Serota said that in the video, "Mitski is lit and styled like a femme fatale from an old noir film, while her lyrics plead for a kiss, likely from the shirtless man lurking in the shadows." Consequence wrote that the music video is "a haunting accompaniment to Mitski' lilting run-on vocals, punctuated by catchy, bleepy synths in one of the stunning album’s most infectious earworms."

== Charts ==
Chart performance for "Washing Machine Heart"
Chart (2021)	Peak position
Ireland (IRMA)	93
UK Independent (Official Charts)	26

== Certifications ==
Certifications for "Washing Machine Heart"
Region	Certification	Certified units/sales
New Zealand (RMNZ)	Platinum	30,000^{‡}
Norway (IFPI Norway)	Gold	30,000^{‡}
United Kingdom (BPI)	Platinum	600,000^{‡}
United States (RIAA)	Platinum	1,000,000^{‡}
Streaming
Sweden (GLF)	Gold	6,000,000^{†}
^{‡} Sales+streaming figures based on certification alone.^{†} Streaming-only figures based on certification alone.
