= Where Do Broken Hearts Go (One Direction song) =

Promotional single by One Direction

from the album Four
- Released: 10 November 2014
- Length: 3:49
- Label: Columbia; Syco
- Songwriter(s): Harry Styles; Julian Bunetta; Ruth-Anne Cunningham; Theodore Geiger; Ali Tamposi
- Producer(s): Bunetta; Pär Westerlund; Geiger

"Where Do Broken Hearts Go" is a song by English-Irish boy band One Direction. The song was released on 10 November 2014, as the third promotional single from their fourth studio album, Four.

== Background and release ==
On 10 November 2014, the group announced those who pre-ordered their fourth studio album, Four, would receive an instant download of "Where Do Broken Hearts Go" on iTunes.

== Composition and lyrics ==
"Where Do Broken Hearts Go" was written by Harry Styles, Julian Bunetta, Ruth-Anne Cunningham, Theodore Geiger, and Ali Tamposi, while production was handled by Bunetta, Pär Westerlund and Geiger. According to the sheet music published at Musicnotes.com, by Alfred Music Publishing, the track runs at 124 BPM and is in the key of E major. Musically, the song blends heavy '80s pop influence with synth beats, "perfectly planned pauses" and high harmonies.

== Critical reception ==
"Where Do Broken Hearts Go" was met with positive reviews from music critics, most noting the heavy 80s' influence of the song. Jason Lipshutz of Billboard stated, "'Where Do Broken Hearts Go' continues down the road of big chords and harmonies designed to echo through stadiums. One Direction also sounds like it's trying to swallow all of popular music in the 1980's — from Journey to George Michael to 'Like a Prayer' — on the song." Bianca Gracie of Idolator felt that the song's sound, "leans more towards Belinda Carlisle's 'Heaven is a Place on Earth'. Christina Garibaldi of MTV praised the group's harmonies, remarking, "Each goes on to sing about the moment you realize you let the one you love get away."

== Chart performance ==
"Where Do Broken Hearts Go" debuted at number 47 on the UK Singles Chart. The song sold 3,781 copies in the UK. The song also peaked at number 88 on the Billboard Hot 100, selling 37,818 copies in the United States. "Where Do Broken Hearts Go" reached the top 50 in Mexico and Spain.

== Personnel ==
- Julian Bunetta – producer, engineering, instrumentation, backing vocals
- Theodore Geiger – producer, backing vocals
- Pär Westerlund – producer
- Niall Horan – guitar
- Andrew Haas – bass guitar
- Damon Bunetta – backing vocals
- Randy Merrill – assistant mastering engineer
- Benjamin Chang – recording engineer
- Alex Oriet – recording engineer
- Ash Howes – mixing (The Dark Room, London, United Kingdom)
- Tom Coyne – mastering (Sterling Sound, Nashville, Tennessee)
- Ian Franzino – assistant engineer

== Charts ==
Chart performance for "Where Do Broken Hearts Go"
Chart (2014)	Peak position
Austria (Ö3 Austria Top 40)	58
Canada (Canadian Hot 100)	90
Greece Digital Songs (Billboard)	6
Ireland (IRMA)	69
France (SNEP)	88
Mexico Ingles Airplay (Billboard)	43
Spain (PROMUSICAE)	39
UK Singles (OCC)	47
US Billboard Hot 100	88

== Certifications ==
Region	Certification	Certified units/sales
United Kingdom (BPI)	Silver	200,000^{‡}
^{‡} Sales+streaming figures based on certification alone.
