= Four (One Direction album) =

Studio album by One Direction
- Released: 17 November 2014
- Recorded: April–September 2014
- Genres: Pop; pop rock
- Length: 43:33
- Labels: Columbia; Syco
- Producers: Julian Bunetta; Pär Westerlund; John Ryan; Teddy Geiger; Steve Robson; Matt Rad; Jamie Scott; Ian Franzino; Afterhrs

One Direction chronology
Midnight Memories (2013)	Four (2014)	Made in the A.M. (2015)

Singles from Four
- 1. "Steal My Girl" Released: 29 September 2014; 2. "Night Changes" Released: 14 November 2014

Four (stylized as all caps) is the fourth studio album by English-Irish boy band One Direction, released on 17 November 2014 by Columbia Records and Syco Music. The album was preceded by two singles, "Steal My Girl" and "Night Changes", both achieving platinum status in the US, and scoring the band their tenth and eleventh UK top-ten hits. The album was also One Direction's last with member Zayn Malik, who announced he was leaving the band on 25 March 2015.

The album received generally positive reviews from music critics. It debuted at number one in 18 countries, including the United Kingdom, Australia and the United States. With Four, One Direction became the first band to have their first four albums debut at number one in the United States. According to the International Federation of the Phonographic Industry (IFPI), Four was the sixth best-selling album of 2014, with 3.2 million copies sold worldwide.

== Background and development ==
On 27 April 2014, it was confirmed that One Direction were working on their fourth studio album. Louis Tomlinson and Liam Payne worked on the majority of the album with songwriters Julian Bunetta, John Ryan, and Jamie Scott; Harry Styles and Zayn Malik also co-wrote tracks with Bunetta, Ryan, Scott, and producer Johan Carlsson.

The name and cover of the album were announced on 8 September on One Direction's official website, along with a free download of a song called "Fireproof", which was available for 24 hours. "Fireproof" was written by Payne and Tomlinson along with Ryan, Scott, and Bunetta, who also wrote their single "Story of My Life". In the 24-hour span, 1.1 million downloads were generated. The song was uploaded onto the band's Vevo account on 22 September.

In an interview with Simon Cowell, it was revealed that one of the songs for the album will be titled "18". The song was written by Ed Sheeran, who also wrote "Little Things" and "Moments" for the group. Horan came up with the name of the album, commemorating the fact that it is the band's fourth album and that it has been four years since their formation.

The album was leaked two weeks prior to its release.

== Promotion ==
=== Tour ===
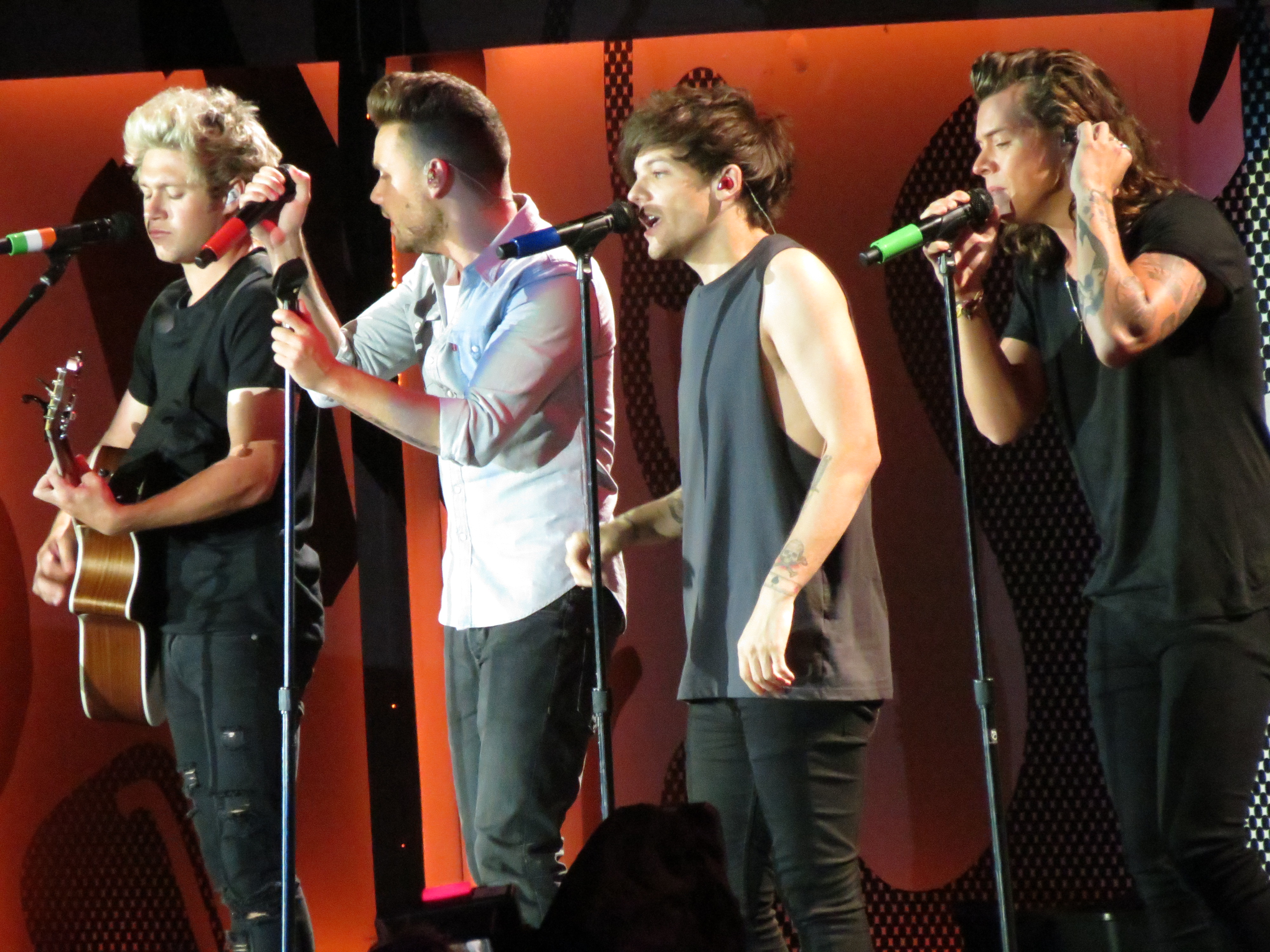
One Direction performing at Soldier Field in Chicago, 2015

The On the Road Again Tour was announced on the Australian breakfast television program Today, where the band gave a pre-recorded interview releasing the details of their return to Australia. It was later announced that the band would also be touring Asia and Africa. The group will be making debuts for some countries, particularly in the United Arab Emirates. On 24 October 2014, the official One Direction site announced several more tour dates, with shows across Europe, the US, and Canada.

The tour began on 7 February 2015 in Sydney, Australia and ended on 31 October 2015 in Sheffield, England. On 19 March 2015, it was announced that group member Zayn Malik would take a break from the tour due to stress. Malik announced his official departure from the group just six days later. The tour grossed $208 million from 80 shows, selling over 2.3 million tickets.

=== Singles ===
"Steal My Girl" was released as the album's first single on 29 September 2014 worldwide and on 19 October 2014 in the UK. "Night Changes" was then released as the album's second single on 14 November 2014.

=== Promotional singles ===
There were five promotional singles released on five different days; when fans pre-ordered the album, they received an instant download of the songs. "Ready to Run" was released as the first promotional single on 6 November. "Where Do Broken Hearts Go" was released as the second promotional single on 10 November. "18" was released as the third promotional single on 11 November. "Girl Almighty" was released as the fourth promotional single on 12 November. "Fool's Gold" was released as the fifth promotional single on 13 November.

== Critical reception ==
Professional ratings
Aggregate scores
Source	Rating
Metacritic	65/100
Review scores
Source	Rating
AllMusic	3.5/5 stars
The A.V. Club	B−
Billboard	2.5/5 stars
The Guardian	3/5 stars
New York Daily News	3/5 stars
Irish Independent	1/5 stars
The Observer	3/5 stars
Slant Magazine	2.5/5 stars
The Daily Telegraph	4/5 stars
Rolling Stone	3/5 stars

Four received generally mixed reviews from music critics. Some argued that the members' songwriting showed signs of maturity, while others claimed the musical content was too similar to the band's previous work. On Metacritic, which assigns a rating out of 100, the album received a score of 65, which indicates generally favorable reviews.

Neil McCormick of The Daily Telegraph found "an unlikely comparison to Bruce Springsteen in the quintet's latest offering", and that Four was "hard to dislike: it's cheery, uplifting, high spirited and good fun", but did still say it was "songwriting by numbers". AllMusic's review said it was the group's "fourth well-crafted, packed-with-great-pop-songs album in a row", although did cynically point out the pattern of each of said albums being released just in time for "optimal holiday-season gift-giving". Tshepo Mokoena of The Guardian gave the album a more mixed review of three-stars, again drawing comparisons with Springsteen but with the caveat of being "hardly groundbreaking pop", and Jim Faber of the New York Daily News also gave three stars and praised the group for "confronting their limitations" but at the same time questioned why whilst doing so they spent "so much time looking back with longing", pointed out an apparent "anxiety" and expressed disappointment that whilst Four represents a step forward in their history, it "represents a step back in both sound and sensibility". Andy Gill, writing for The Independent, commented that the album is "a long way from the standard X Factor fare" while praising the songwriting of Tomlinson and Payne.

Kitty Empire, writing for The Guardian, stated that the album "ups the chords a smidgen further" and that the group's "new direction owes a substantial debt to the big guitar pop of the 80s" while also adding that the group's music is "no longer kids' stuff". Jon Dolan of Rolling Stone wrote that "One Direction extend their winning streak, with echoes of the 1970s and 1980s" while also commenting that "the vocal duties are divvied up in ways that highlight the singers’ similarities" and that they "have mastered the ancient boy-band art of whispering directly into listeners’ ears". Jamieson Cox of Time wrote that "the album as a whole takes another step towards the stadium-sized rock first suggested by Midnight Memories and "their take on the sound is immaculate: arrangements are grand and spacious, with guitar lines glistening and rhythms cavernous and blooming, and the band’s increasingly distinct vocals — allowed to sparkle via the use of harmony more than ever — at the forefront" while commenting that the album sounds similar to "80s arena anthems in the vein of Journey, Bryan Adams, and Bruce Springsteen. Andrew Unterberger of Spin praised the album's 80's sound while commenting that the songs are "intoxicating, adrenalizing, and undeniably visceral blasts of old-school pop/rock, furthered by the group’s commitment to patently ridiculous lyrics" while ending the review with "the question of whether they can find a permanent safe haven is less certain — if they pretend to be Bon Jovi for long enough, will we forget that they started out as New Kids on the Block? Probably not, but hell, no boy band has ever made it this far and still managed to sell this much and sound this good".

James Reed of the Boston Globe commented that the album "is the first one that doesn’t immediately summon memories of The X Factor and that although "its mix of driving power pop, muscular harmonies, and acoustic alchemy is as manicured as the group’s previous bestsellers", is also "hints at a broader future for the lads". Mikael Wood of the Los Angeles Times said that the album "is their best work yet" while comparing the sound to Fleetwood Mac, The Beach Boys, and David Bowie. Writing with Vice, Laura Reineke wrote that "Four is "a focused, genuinely fun pop-rock album, and a sign of truly promising growth that isn't likely to taper off soon" while adding that "it’s smarter lyrically, warmer emotionally, and considerably more cohesive than any of their three previous studio outings".

Less positive reviews came from Chuck Arnold of Billboard magazine and James Rainis of Slant Magazine, both awarding just two-and-a-half stars. The former claimed "One Direction aren't ready to let go of their bubble-gum days", whilst Rainis ended his take by saying "the album's irresistibly obvious choruses, hackneyed sentiments, and puppy-eyed earnestness can come off as endearing when the songwriting is clever enough, but every misstep is, despite the band's efforts to assert more control over their music, a painful reminder of One Direction's status as a manufactured, focus-grouped pop entity." Annie Zaleski, writing for The A.V. Club, wrote that the album lacks "creative urgency" and "is dominated by pastel synth washes and inoffensive whiffs of EDM, as well as midtempo syrupy croons and sonic retreads" while ending her review with "that retreat from distinct personality—something the members possess in spades—is perhaps the most disappointing thing about Four." Ed Power of The Irish Independent commented that the album "falls short of the radical decoupling from the past such ambitions demand" and that "it's a little rugged around the edges yet at the centre is blandly, tiresomely soppy".

The album was placed at number eleven on Cosmopolitan's list of "The 20 Best Albums of 2014". Jessica Goodman and Ryan Kistobak of The Huffington Post included the album on their list of 2014's best releases, claiming that "2014 will forever be known as the year that we realized One Direction was actually, dare we say, good." Goodman further complimented the album as a "complex, feel-good trip down young love lane". Billboard named Four the best boy band album of the last thirty years, calling it "the absolute standard-bearer for the last decade of pop".

== Commercial performance ==
Released on 12 November 2014, the album quickly rose to the top of the UK Albums Chart, with 142,000 copies sold during its first week. The album scored One Direction their third consecutive number one album. Based on UK sales, it was certified Gold by the BPI in its first week, and certified Platinum in its fourth week.

The deluxe edition of Four became the top charted album on iTunes in some 67 countries. In the US, the album debuted at No. 1 on the Billboard 200 chart on the week ending 23 November 2014, with sales of 387,000. One Direction thus became the first musical group to have each of their first four studio albums debut at No. 1; the Monkees and the Kingston Trio also reached No. 1 with their first four albums but not in the first week of sales. One Direction follows three solo artists who have attained No. 1 status with their first four albums: Britney Spears and DMX in 2003, and Beyoncé in 2011. (In 2013, Beyoncé's fifth album also debuted at No. 1.) Four sold 814,000 copies in the US in 2014, the ninth best-selling album of the year. The album reached its millionth sales mark in the U.S. in August 2015, and has sold 1,016,000 as of October 2015.

== Accolades ==
=== Decade-end lists ===
Publication	List	Rank	Ref.
Billboard	Billboard's 200 Greatest Albums of the 2010s	200	

== Track listing ==
Four – standard edition
No.	Title	Writer(s)	Producer(s)	Length
1.	"Steal My Girl"	Louis Tomlinson; Liam Payne; Wayne Hector; Julian Bunetta; Ed Drewett; John Ryan	Julian Bunetta; Pär Westerlund; John Ryan	3:48
2.	"Ready to Run"	Tomlinson; Payne; Jamie Scott; Bunetta; Ryan	Bunetta; Ryan	3:16
3.	"Where Do Broken Hearts Go"	Harry Styles; Bunetta; Ruth-Anne Cunningham; Theodore Geiger; Ali Tamposi	Bunetta; Pär Westerlund; Teddy Geiger	3:49
4.	"18"	Ed Sheeran; Oliver Frank	Steve Robson; Matt Rad^{[a]}; Sam Miller^{[b]}	4:08
5.	"Girl Almighty"	Bunetta; Ryan; S. Pages Mehner	Bunetta; Ryan; Alexander Oriet^{[a]}	3:21
6.	"Fool's Gold"	Scott; Maureen McDonald; Niall Horan; Zayn Malik; Styles; Tomlinson; Payne	Rad; Jamie Scott; Sam Miller^{[a]}	3:31
7.	"Night Changes"	Scott; Bunetta; Ryan; Horan; Malik; Styles; Payne; Tomlinson	Bunetta; Ryan	3:46
8.	"No Control"	Tomlinson; Cunningham; Scott; Payne; Bunetta; Ryan	Bunetta; Ian Franzino; Ryan; Afterhrs	3:19
9.	"Fireproof"	Payne; Tomlinson; Ryan; Scott; Bunetta	Bunetta; Ryan; Ben "Bengineer" Chang^{[b]}	2:54
10.	"Spaces"	Tomlinson; Payne; Scott; Bunetta; Ryan	Bunetta; Afterhrs; Ryan	4:16
11.	"Stockholm Syndrome"	Styles; Bunetta; Ryan; Johan Carlsson	Bunetta; Ryan	3:34
12.	"Clouds"	Tomlinson; Payne; Malik; Scott; Bunetta; Ryan	Bunetta; Ryan	3:51
Total length:				43:33

Four – The Ultimate Edition
No.	Title	Writer(s)	Producer(s)	Length
13.	"Change Your Ticket"	Payne; Tomlinson; Horan; Malik; Styles; Sam Martin; Bunetta; Ryan	Bunetta; Afterhrs	4:26
14.	"Illusion"	Payne; Scott; Bunetta; Ryan	Bunetta; Ryan	3:14
15.	"Once in a Lifetime"	Scott; Bunetta; Ryan	Bunetta; Ryan	2:38
16.	"Act My Age"	Bunetta; Drewett; Ryan	Bunetta; Ryan	3:18

Four – Japanese edition
No.	Title	Writer(s)	Producer(s)	Length
13.	"Steal My Girl" (Big Payno & Afterhrs Pool Party Remix)	Tomlinson; Payne; Hector; Bunetta; Drewett; Ryan	Bunetta; Westerlund; Ryan; Payne^{[a]}; Aftrhrs^{[a]}	5:20
14.	"Steal My Girl" (Acoustic Version)	Tomlinson; Payne; Hector; Julian Bunetta; Drewett; Ryan	Bunetta; Westerlund; Ryan	3:47
15.	"Story of My Life" (Live from San Siro)	Scott; Ryan; Horan; Malik; Payne; Styles; Tomlinson	Bunetta; Ryan	4:09

Notes

- ^{^[a]} signifies an additional producer
- ^{^[b]} signifies a vocal producer

== Personnel ==
Credits taken from Four's liner notes.

One Direction

- Niall Horan – lead vocals (all tracks), background vocals (tracks 1, 3, 5, 7, 8, 10–12), guitar (3)
- Zayn Malik – lead vocals (all tracks), background vocals (tracks 1, 3, 5, 7, 8, 10–12)
- Liam Payne – lead vocals (all tracks), background vocals (tracks 1, 3, 5, 7, 8, 10–12)
- Harry Styles – lead vocals (all tracks), background vocals (tracks 1, 3, 5, 7, 8, 10–12)
- Louis Tomlinson – lead vocals (all tracks), background vocals (tracks 1, 3, 5, 7, 8, 10–12)

Additional musicians

- Damon Bunetta – background vocals (tracks 1–3, 8, 12), live drums (5)
- Julian Bunetta – all instruments (tracks 1–3, 7, 8, 10–12), programming (1), background vocals (1–3, 7–11), drums (9)
- Peter Bunetta – live drums (track 5)
- Ed Drewett – background vocals (track 1)
- Ian Franzino – all instruments (track 8), additional instruments (10)
- Teddy Geiger – background vocals (track 3)
- Andrew Haas – bass (track 3), all instruments (8), additional instruments (10)
- Wayne Hector – background vocals (track 1)
- Noah Livingston – background vocals (track 10)
- Luke Potashnick – guitars (track 4)
- Matt Rad – drums, programming (tracks 4, 6); keyboards (4); guitar, piano (6)
- Steve Robson – bass (track 4)
- John Ryan – all instruments (tracks 1, 2, 5, 7, 8, 10–12), background vocals (1, 2, 5, 7–12), programming (1), live drums (5), guitars (9), Wurlitzer
- Jamie Scott – background vocals (tracks 2, 6–10, 12), all instruments (2, 7, 10, 12), keyboards (6), guitars (9)
- Paro Westerlund – programming (track 1)

Technical

- Julian Bunetta – engineering (tracks 1–3, 5, 7–12), mixing (2, 7)
- Ben "Bengineer" Chang – vocal recording (tracks 1–3, 5–12)
- Tom Coyne – mastering
- Ian Dowling – engineering (track 4)
- Ian Franzino – engineering assistance (tracks 1–3, 5, 7, 9–12), engineering (8)
- Serban Ghenea – mixing (tracks 1, 4)
- Andrew Haas – engineering (tracks 8, 10)
- John Hanes – engineering for mix (tracks 1, 4)
- Helene Horlyck – vocal coach
- Ash Howes – mixing (tracks 3, 8–12)
- Randy Merrill – mastering assistance
- Sam Miller – engineering (track 4)
- Alex Oriet – vocal recording (tracks 1–3, 5–12)
- John Ryan – engineering (tracks 1, 2, 5, 7, 9–12)
- Joe Zook – mixing (tracks 2, 5–7)

Visuals

- RJ Shaughnessy – photography
- Fluidesign – design

== Charts ==
=== Weekly charts ===
Chart (2014)	Peak position
Argentine Albums (CAPIF)	1
Australian Albums (ARIA)	1
Austrian Albums (Ö3 Austria)	1
Belgian Albums (Ultratop Flanders)	1
Belgian Albums (Ultratop Wallonia)	3
Brazilian Albums (Billboard)	2
Canadian Albums (Billboard)	1
Chinese Albums (Sino Chart)	17
Czech Albums (ČNS IFPI)	4
Danish Albums (Hitlisten)	1
Dutch Albums (Album Top 100)	1
Finnish Albums (Suomen virallinen lista)	3
French Albums (SNEP)	2
German Albums (Offizielle Top 100)	5
Greek Albums (IFPI)	5
Hungarian Albums (MAHASZ)	6
Irish Albums (IRMA)	1
Italian Albums (FIMI)	1
Japanese Albums (Oricon)	1
Mexican Albums (AMPROFON)	1
New Zealand Albums (RMNZ)	1
Norwegian Albums (VG-lista)	1
Polish Albums (ZPAV)	3
Portuguese Albums (AFP)	1
Scottish Albums (Official Charts)	1
South African Albums (RISA)	3
South Korean Albums (Gaon)	24
South Korean International Albums (Gaon)	4
Spanish Albums (Promusicae)	2
Swedish Albums (Sverigetopplistan)	1
Swiss Albums (Schweizer Hitparade)	2
Taiwanese Albums (G-Music)	4
Taiwanese International Albums (G-Music)	2
Taiwanese Western Albums (G-Music)	2
UK Albums (Official Charts)	1
US Billboard 200	1

=== Year-end charts ===
Chart (2014)	Position
Australian Albums (ARIA)	14
Belgian Albums (Ultratop Flanders)	31
Belgian Albums (Ultratop Wallonia)	67
Brazilian Albums (ABPD)	7
Dutch Albums (Album Top 100)	21
Finnish Albums (Suomen virallinen lista)	3
French Albums (SNEP)	58
German Albums (Offizielle Top 100)	77
Italian Albums (FIMI)	7
Japanese Albums (Oricon)	47
Mexican Albums (AMPROFON)	3
Polish Albums (ZPAV)	27
Spanish Albums (PROMUSICAE)	12
Swedish Albums (Sverigetopplistan)	24
Swiss Albums (Schweizer Hitparade)	54
UK Albums (OCC)	7

Chart (2015)	Position
Australian Albums (ARIA)	71
Belgian Albums (Ultratop Flanders)	78
Belgian Albums (Ultratop Wallonia)	127
Canadian Albums (Billboard)	4
Italian Albums (FIMI)	60
Mexican Albums (AMPROFON)	30
Spanish Albums (PROMUSICAE)	54
Swedish Albums (Sverigetopplistan)	27
UK Albums (OCC)	50
US Billboard 200	10

Chart (2020)	Position
Belgian Albums (Ultratop Flanders)	110

Chart (2021)	Position
Belgian Albums (Ultratop Flanders)	95

Chart (2022)	Position
Belgian Albums (Ultratop Flanders)	175

Chart (2023)	Position
Belgian Albums (Ultratop Flanders)	159

Chart (2024)	Position
Belgian Albums (Ultratop Flanders)	139

=== Decade-end charts ===
Chart (2010–2019)	Position
UK Albums (OCC)	100
US Billboard 200	200

== Certifications ==
Region	Certification	Certified units/sales
Australia (ARIA)	2× Platinum	140,000^{^}
Austria (IFPI Austria)	Gold	7,500^{*}
Brazil (Pro-Música Brasil)	3× Platinum	120,000^{*}
Canada (Music Canada)	Platinum	98,000
Denmark (IFPI Danmark)	4× Platinum	80,000^{‡}
France (SNEP)	Platinum	100,000^{*}
Germany (BVMI)	Gold	100,000^{‡}
Hungary (MAHASZ)	Gold	1,000^{^}
Italy (FIMI)	3× Platinum	150,000^{‡}
Japan (RIAJ)	Gold	100,000^{^}
Mexico (AMPROFON)	2× Platinum+Gold	150,000^{^}
New Zealand (RMNZ)	3× Platinum	45,000^{‡}
Philippines (PARI)	Platinum	15,000^{*}
Poland (ZPAV)	2× Platinum	40,000^{‡}
Portugal (AFP)	Platinum	15,000^{^}
Singapore (RIAS)	Platinum	10,000^{*}
South Africa (RISA)	Gold	20,000^{*}
Spain (Promusicae)	Platinum	40,000^{^}
Sweden (GLF)	Platinum	40,000^{‡}
United Kingdom (BPI)	3× Platinum	900,000^{‡}
United States (RIAA)	Platinum	1,142,000
^{*} Sales figures based on certification alone.^{^} Shipments figures based on certification alone.^{‡} Sales+streaming figures based on certification alone.

== Release history ==
Country	Date	Format(s)	Edition(s)	Label	Ref.
Canada	17 November 2014	CD; Digital download	Standard; Deluxe	Syco	
France	17 November 2014	CD; Digital download	Standard; Deluxe	Syco	
Germany	17 November 2014	CD; Digital download	Standard; Deluxe	Syco	
Italy	17 November 2014	CD; Digital download	Standard; Deluxe	Syco	
United Kingdom	17 November 2014	CD; Digital download	Standard; Deluxe	Syco	
United States	17 November 2014	CD; Digital download	Standard; Deluxe	Columbia	
Spain	18 November 2014	CD; Digital download	Standard; Deluxe	Syco	
Japan	19 November 2014	CD; Digital download	Standard; Deluxe	Sony	
United Kingdom	15 December 2014	Vinyl	Standard	Syco	
