= Puberty 2 =

Studio album by Mitski
- Released: June 17, 2016
- Studio: Acme (Westchester, New York)
- Genres: Indie rock; punk rock
- Length: 31:25
- Label: Dead Oceans
- Producer: Patrick Hyland

Mitski chronology
Bury Me at Makeout Creek (2014)	Puberty 2 (2016)	Be the Cowboy (2018)

Singles from Puberty 2
- 1. "Your Best American Girl" Released: March 1, 2016; 2. "Happy" Released: May 3, 2016

Puberty 2 is the fourth studio album by American indie pop singer-songwriter Mitski, released on June 17, 2016, the first release through Dead Oceans. It was produced by longtime collaborator Patrick Hyland. Upon its release, Puberty 2 received widespread acclaim from music critics, with many praising Mitski's emotional delivery and lyrically complex themes, which include longing, love, depression, alienation and racial identity. The album was preceded by the lead single "Your Best American Girl" on March 1, 2016, alongside the announcement of the album, and the second single "Happy" on May 3, 2016. A music video for "A Burning Hill" was released on October 11, 2016, followed by a tour covering North American and Europe. On June 9, 2026, the 10 year anniversary deluxe edition—which included bonus tracks "Fireproof" and "I'm a Fool to Want You” from the original Japanese CD—was released.

== Background and recording ==
In a Q&A with Stereogum regarding Puberty 2, Mitski stated that after the breakout indie success of her third studio album, Bury Me at Makeout Creek, she felt out of touch with music, and that she "went back to her roots" in recording Puberty 2 by drawing inspiration from the compositions of all three of her previous studio albums. She also stated that in contrast to her previous album, Bury Me at Makeout Creek, Puberty 2's music would not be made with the intent to be performed live at DIY venues in similar renditions, and instead she would create new renditions of the songs to perform live. The album was recorded entirely in the now-defunct Acme Studios in Westchester, New York, over a two-week period with producer and longtime collaborator Patrick Hyland.

== Composition ==
The New York Times labeled the sound of Puberty 2 as "an impressive collection of D.I.Y. punk and indie rock". According to Jillian Mapes of Pitchfork, Puberty 2's composition contains second-wave emo, "wistful dream pop", "slow-simmering electronics", "brusquely strummed folk-punk", surf guitar, and "plenty of '60s pop hooks". Mapes also noted Mitski's vocal delivery on the album to go through different "modes", including "deadpan disenfranchisement, smooth R&B, dream pop croon, gasping-for-breath pleas, [and] wall of harmonies (with herself)".

== Critical reception ==
Professional ratings
Aggregate scores
Source	Rating
AnyDecentMusic?	8.2/10
Metacritic	87/100
Review scores
Source	Rating
AllMusic	5/5 stars
The A.V. Club	A
Consequence of Sound	A−
Financial Times	4/5 stars
The Guardian	4/5 stars
Pitchfork	8.5/10
Q	4/5 stars
Rolling Stone	3.5/5 stars
Spin	9/10
Uncut	8/10

Puberty 2 was released to widespread acclaim from music critics. At Metacritic the album received an average score of 87, based on 22 reviews, indicating "universal acclaim". Critics praised the album's more restrained and nuanced emotional trajectory, as well as its complex lyrical themes, which include longing, love, depression, alienation, and racial identity. Laura Snapes of NPR commented on the album's subtlety, writing that Puberty 2 "is a strike against the happy/sad poles that govern our lives." Katie Rife of The A.V. Club deemed it "a triumphant new step in her evolution".

=== Accolades ===
Publication	Accolade	Year	Rank	Ref.
The A.V. Club	The A.V. Club's Top 50 Albums of 2016	2016	8	
The Observer	The 25 best albums of the century so far	2025	—N/a	
Paste	The 50 Best Albums of 2016	2016	5	
Pitchfork	The 20 Best Rock Albums of 2016	2016	—N/a	
Pitchfork	The 50 Best Albums of 2016	2016	18	
Pitchfork	The 200 Best Albums of the 2010s	2019	30	
Rolling Stone	50 Best Albums of 2016	2016	23	
Rough Trade	Albums of the Year	2016	73	
The Skinny	Top 50 Albums of 2016	2016	15	
Stereogum	The 50 Best Albums of 2016	2016	8	
Time	The Top 10 Best Albums	2016	3	

== Track listing ==
All tracks are written by Mitski Miyawaki, except where noted.

No.	Title	Length
1.	"Happy"	3:40
2.	"Dan the Dancer"	2:25
3.	"Once More to See You"	3:01
4.	"Fireworks"	2:37
5.	"Your Best American Girl"	3:32
6.	"I Bet on Losing Dogs"	2:50
7.	"My Body's Made of Crushed Little Stars"	1:56
8.	"Thursday Girl"	3:08
9.	"A Loving Feeling"	1:32
10.	"Crack Baby"	4:52
11.	"A Burning Hill"	1:49
Total length:		31:25

Japanese CD bonus tracks
No.	Title	Writer(s)	Length
12.	"Fireproof"	Louis Tomlinson; Liam Payne; John Ryan; Jamie Scott; Julian Bunetta	1:49
13.	"I'm a Fool to Want You"	Jack Wolf; Joel Herron; Frank Sinatra	3:49
Total length:			37:03

10th Anniversary Deluxe Edition tracks
No.	Title	Writer(s)	Length
12.	"Fireproof"	Louis Tomlinson; Liam Payne; John Ryan; Jamie Scott; Julian Bunetta	1:49
13.	"I'm a Fool to Want You"	Jack Wolf; Joel Herron; Frank Sinatra	3:49
Total length:			37:03

== Personnel ==
- Mitski – music, performance, album art
- Patrick Hyland – production, performance, mastering, photographs

== Charts ==
Chart (2016)	Peak position
Belgian Albums (Ultratop Flanders)	137
US Heatseekers Albums (Billboard)	5
US Independent Albums (Billboard)	18
US Top Alternative Albums (Billboard)	19
US Top Rock Albums (Billboard)	32

Chart (2026)	Peak position
US Top Album Sales (Billboard)	38

== Certifications ==
Region	Certification	Certified units/sales
United Kingdom (BPI)	Silver	60,000^{‡}
United States (RIAA)	Gold	500,000^{‡}
^{‡} Sales+streaming figures based on certification alone.
