= Overcoats (duo) =

American indie pop music duo

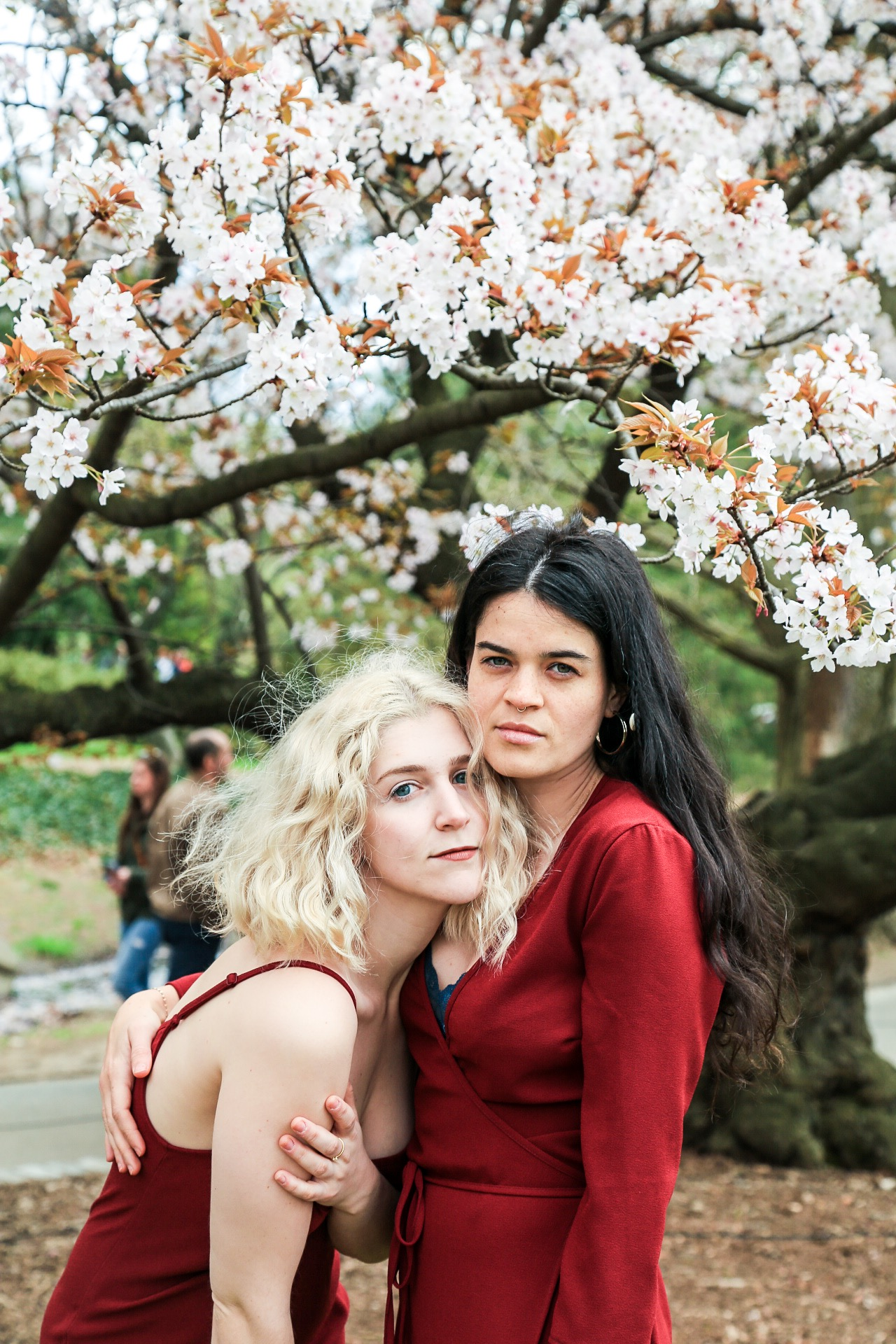
- Hana Elion (left) and JJ Mitchell of Overcoats

Background information
- Origin: New York City, New York, U.S.
- Genres: Indie pop
- Years active: 2015–present
- Labels: Arts & Crafts, Loma Vista
- Members: Hana Elion; JJ Mitchell
- Website: overcoatsmusic.com

Overcoats is a New York based indie pop duo consisting of singer-songwriters Hana Elion and JJ Mitchell. Their second full length record, The Fight, came out March 6, 2020 on Loma Vista Recordings. On June 4, 2021, they released an EP, Used To Be Scared Of The Dark, featuring collaborations with Middle Kids and Tennis (also out on Loma Vista Recordings).

== History ==
=== Formation ===
Elion was born in New York but grew up in Washington, D.C., spending time in Jamaica, Uganda, and Belize in her younger years. Mitchell was born in London but grew up in New York, England, and Egypt. The two ended up crossing paths in 2011 at Wesleyan University, a liberal arts college in Middletown, Connecticut. Elion and Mitchell were immediately drawn to each other when they first met, finding connection in their, "diverse love of music". Both halves of Overcoats describe the first time hearing each other sing as an, "epiphany, with the harmony of their combined voices leading to personal and individual discoveries."

=== 2015-2017: YOUNG ===
After releasing their self-titled EP Overcoats in 2015, Elion and Mitchell began working on a follow-up project and enlisted producers such as Nicolas Vernhes (Daughter, The War On Drugs, Dirty Projectors) and experimental R&B artist Autre Ne Veut. YOUNG was released on April 21, 2017, through Arts & Crafts Productions.

NPR called YOUNG "one of the best albums of 2017" and praised the duo's passion and ambition, stating, "Overcoats' Young is a record driven by ambition and passion, not craft. That's not to say Hana Elion and JJ Mitchell aren't terrifically talented singers and songwriters: What sets them apart is that I believe them. That the emotion in their harmonies and the space they give each other is filled with compassion. I believe their songs of loneliness and doubt."

=== 2019: The Fool ===
On September 4, 2019, the duo released a new single called ‘The Fool.’ In the accompanying promotional video, the duo shave their heads. Hana and JJ provided the accompanying statement with the video:

“We wrote it based on ‘The Fool’ tarot card,” says JJ. “It signifies taking a leap of faith and jumping into the unknown. Conceptually, it felt like the beginning of the project. We wiped the slate clean and decided to jump. That’s why the video includes the footage of us shaving our heads. We’re ‘The Fool’, and we’re taking our leap.” “It’s an empowering message,” continues Hana. “I don’t need to be defined by the opinions of others or go with the status quo; I can fucking be myself.”

Produced by Justin Raisen and Yves Rothman, The Fight has been described as a “ten-song battle cry.” Despite more of a rock & roll grittiness to the sound, two voices singing in harmony is still at the core of The Fight.

=== 2021 - 2022: Used To Be Scared Of The Dark and Horsegirl ===
Enlisting the help of their friends, Overcoats made a 4 track EP consisting of collaborations with Tennis, Middle Kids, Lawrence Rothman, and Local Natives.

==== Horsegirl ====
In November 2022, Overcoats released “Horsegirl,” a country-tinged indie pop song, their first with distribution company Thirty Tigers.

== Touring history ==
The band toured their first album in North America and parts of Europe from 2017-2018. In addition to headline touring, Overcoats has toured opening for Mitski, Maggie Rogers, Cold War Kids, Tennis and The Japanese House.

== Musical style and influences ==
Overcoats list The Chicks, Simon & Garfunkel and Kacey Musgraves as some of their influences. They cite inspiration from the harmonies of folk music, electronic, pop, and Americana.

== Discography ==
=== Albums ===
- Young (2017)
- The Fight (2020)
- Winner (2023)
