= Nobody (Mitski song) =

2018 song by Mitski

Single by Mitski

from the album Be the Cowboy
- Released: June 26, 2018
- Genre: Art pop; disco
- Length: 3:13
- Label: Dead Oceans
- Songwriter: Mitski
- Producer: Patrick Hyland

Mitski singles chronology
"Geyser" (2018)	"Nobody" (2018)	"Two Slow Dancers" (2018)

Music video
- "Nobody" on YouTube

"Nobody" is a song by American singer Mitski, released in 2018 as the second single from her fifth studio album, Be the Cowboy. The song was lauded upon its release, with praise going toward's Mitski's lyricism and vocal performance, as well as the production.

== Background and composition ==
"Nobody" was the second single released from Mitski's 2018 album, Be the Cowboy. She told The New Yorker in 2019 that she wrote the song in Kuala Lumpur on a toy piano that she bought from Toys "R" Us during Christmas time.

I was completely, unexpectedly crushed by the fact that I not only didn’t know anyone in the country but it was the holidays, and everyone’s with their family and I wasn’t.

— Mitski on writing "Nobody".

She composed the music first, then sketched out the opening lyrics. According to Musicnotes.com, the song is performed in the key of C-major, with a tempo of 113 beats per minute in common time. The Harvard Crimson, considering the song to be about loneliness, wrote that it is eerily upbeat, with melancholic lyrics contradicting its catchy melody.

== Music video ==
A music video for the song was released on the same day as the single, directed by Christopher Good. About the music video, Mitski said "We shot this video over five days, in both sides of Kansas City. I've never been able to take this much time to shoot a video, so it was wonderful to have the space to get the details right, as well as actually hang out and have fun with everyone involved. This video made me fall unexpectedly in love with Kansas City." She also said "It was actually hard to get this one little shot where the magnifying glass goes directly in front of my eye, because in one swift motion I had to raise the magnifying glass at exactly the right angle where the camera catches my blurry eye right behind it. We did a lot of the shots in this video over and over, it had to be precise. And I loved every minute of it."

Paper wrote that the video "doubles as apt social commentary about loneliness and women utilizing emotion, even of the intense variety, as a locus of power and control."

== Reception ==
Pitchfork wrote, "despite the melancholy piano chords and simmering four-on-the-floor beat, Mitski embodies her album title: She sounds like a wallflower joining the aching, lonesome tradition of sad cowboys like Hank Williams. Her lyrics are raw and essential, the same mix of vulnerability and strength that made songs like 2014's 'I Don't Smoke' feel like emotional armor, and instantly classic."

Stereogum considered "Nobody" to be the best Mitski song, writing that "there's plenty to love about 'Nobody': The tight hi-hat drumming, the plainspoken tale, the gracefulness with which Mitski leaps to high notes. The best part, however, comes at the very end: A key change reprise", as well as saying that "it's the most musically joyful song about a panic attack out there, and, in classic Mitski fashion, she knows the most terrifying way to end it is by suggesting there's no end at all."

Consequence also thought that the song was Mitski's best, writing that it has "not only become finer with age, it's an example of what she does best: there's a universe of emotions, a deep longing for intimacy and connection, for somebody, crammed into a three-minute disco track, immediately relatable, dance-worthy, and devastating at the same time."

Spin wrote, "You would think a song made up of someone looping the word “nobody” over and over is doomed to fail but Mitski manages to turn kitschy into catchy without being overwrought."

AllMusic critic Marcy Donelson thought that the song was a highlight on the album, describing "Nobody" as "disco-injected".

=== TikTok trend ===
In 2021, three years after its release, "Nobody" gained prominent viral popularity on the short-form online video platform TikTok. The song was used in a TikTok trend or meme where the song's crescendo and repeating "nobody" lyric played as users filmed themselves comically running away from the camera, often accompanied by on-screen text describing an uncomfortable situation or problem they were metaphorically evading. This trend was credited with helping popularize Mitski's music with a new, younger demographic beyond her traditional, more niche indie listenership.

== Certifications ==
Certifications for "Nobody"
Region	Certification	Certified units/sales
New Zealand (RMNZ)	Gold	15,000^{‡}
United Kingdom (BPI)	Silver	200,000^{‡}
United States (RIAA)	Platinum	1,000,000^{‡}
^{‡} Sales+streaming figures based on certification alone.
