= Geyser (song) =

2018 song by Mitski

Single by Mitski

from the album Be the Cowboy
- Released: May 14, 2018
- Genre: Art pop
- Length: 2:23
- Label: Dead Oceans
- Songwriter: Mitski
- Producer: Patrick Hyland

Mitski singles chronology
"Between the Breaths" (2018)	"Geyser" (2018)	"Nobody" (2018)

Music video
- "Geyser" on YouTube

"Geyser" is a song by American singer Mitski, released on May 14, 2018, as the lead single from her fifth studio album, Be the Cowboy. She performed the song on The Daily Show in September 2018.

== Background ==
About the song, Mitski said "I think this is one of my vaguest songs. Usually my songs have a narrative of some sort. But this song is all feeling."

It was the first song to be written for Be the Cowboy. Mitski said:

I started to write it in college; it's the song I've taken the longest to write. It had become my White Whale - Moby Dick reference - where I couldn't get it right. Every time I thought I'd finished it it just didn't feel right, so I kept changing it. It's gone through many iterations; probably people who went to school with me, who've been in seminars with me, are like "wait, I heard that somewhere..." And then I finally got to a point where I was like "you know what, I need to end this, I'm never gonna be happy with it so let me finish it." So I did.

Pitchfork writer Olivia Horn in her track review of "Geyser" said, "The structure of the song defies logic, just as its subject does: [Mitski] Miyawaki has scrapped the verse-chorus-verse-bridge structure, instead building out three separate hooks and pasting them together, one after the other. Midway through the song, everything erupts like—not to be too obvious—a geyser, guitars and violins crescendoing as Miyawaki professes her devotion."

Vice wrote that the song features "ominous organ sounds and Mitski's trademark sonic swell. When the percussion comes in the whole thing comes alive, and there are some added synth lines that make it particularly huge and dramatic. Mitski's lyrics – always gut-wrenching – echo the song's build, as she sings on the chorus 'Though I'm a geyser / Feel it bubbling from below'".

== Music video ==
A music video for "Geyser", directed by Zia Anger, was released on the same day as the single. The Fader wrote that the video takes place on "a gloomy and funereal beachside while Mitski strikes desperate movements that hit at the longing at the heart of the song."

== Reception ==
The Fader ranked "Geyser" as the 12th best song of 2018, writing that the song is "reminiscent of a worship song in the ways she pledges wholehearted devotion to an entity that routinely causes suffering. In Mitski's case that entity is music, but the personal is universal, and it's easy to listen to 'Geyser' and think of your own relationships to your own things."

In June 2018, The Ringer included the song on their list of "The Best Songs of 2018—So Far".
