= Your Best American Girl =

2016 song by Mitski

Single by Mitski

from the album Puberty 2
- Released: March 1, 2016
- Studio: Acme, Westchester, New York
- Genre: Punk rock; pop-punk
- Length: 3:32
- Label: Dead Oceans
- Songwriter: Mitski
- Producer: Patrick Hyland

Mitski singles chronology
| "I Will" (2014) | "Your Best American Girl" (2016) | "Happy" (2016) |

Music video
- "Your Best American Girl" on YouTube

"Your Best American Girl" is a song by American singer Mitski, from her fourth studio album, Puberty 2 (2016). The song was released on March 1, 2016, as the lead single from the album. It was written by Mitski and produced by Patrick Hyland.

"Your Best American Girl"'s instrumentation has been described as consisting of acoustic guitar strumming, dream pop synthesizers, and a grungy, distorted guitar. The song's lyrics are autobiographical, discussing Mitski's want for a relationship with someone, but accepting that her racial identity and upbringing obstruct her from this goal.

== Background and release ==
"Your Best American Girl" was written by Mitski. It was produced and mastered by Patrick Hyland. The song was recorded in the now-defunct Acme Studios in Westchester, New York. "Your Best American Girl" was released on March 1, 2016, to digital retailers and label Dead Oceans' SoundCloud, where it was able to be streamed for free. It was also available as an instant gratification track for those who pre-ordered Puberty 2 on iTunes.

== Composition ==
"Your Best American Girl" is a punk rock and pop-punk song that is three minutes and thirty-two seconds long. Consequence of Sound has described the song as "start[ing] off as a sauntering acoustic indie number build[ing] until it breaks as a shining punk song"". The song's lyrics are autobiographical, discussing Mitski's want for a relationship with someone, but accepting that her racial identity and upbringing obstruct her from this goal. According to Pitchfork, the song "grows from an acoustic strum with some twinkling dream pop synths, to sharp bursts of feedback that would fit right in on Weezer's Pinkerton." Katie Rife of A.V. Club likened the "crashing waves of guitars" present in the song to Pixies. Ciara Dolan of Consequence of Sound noted a possible continuation of Retired From Sad, New Career in Business's "Strawberry Blonde", calling "Your Best American Girl" "the [...] realization that [Mitski] can’t [...] change her own shape to fit into that of this all-American boy".

== Critical reception ==
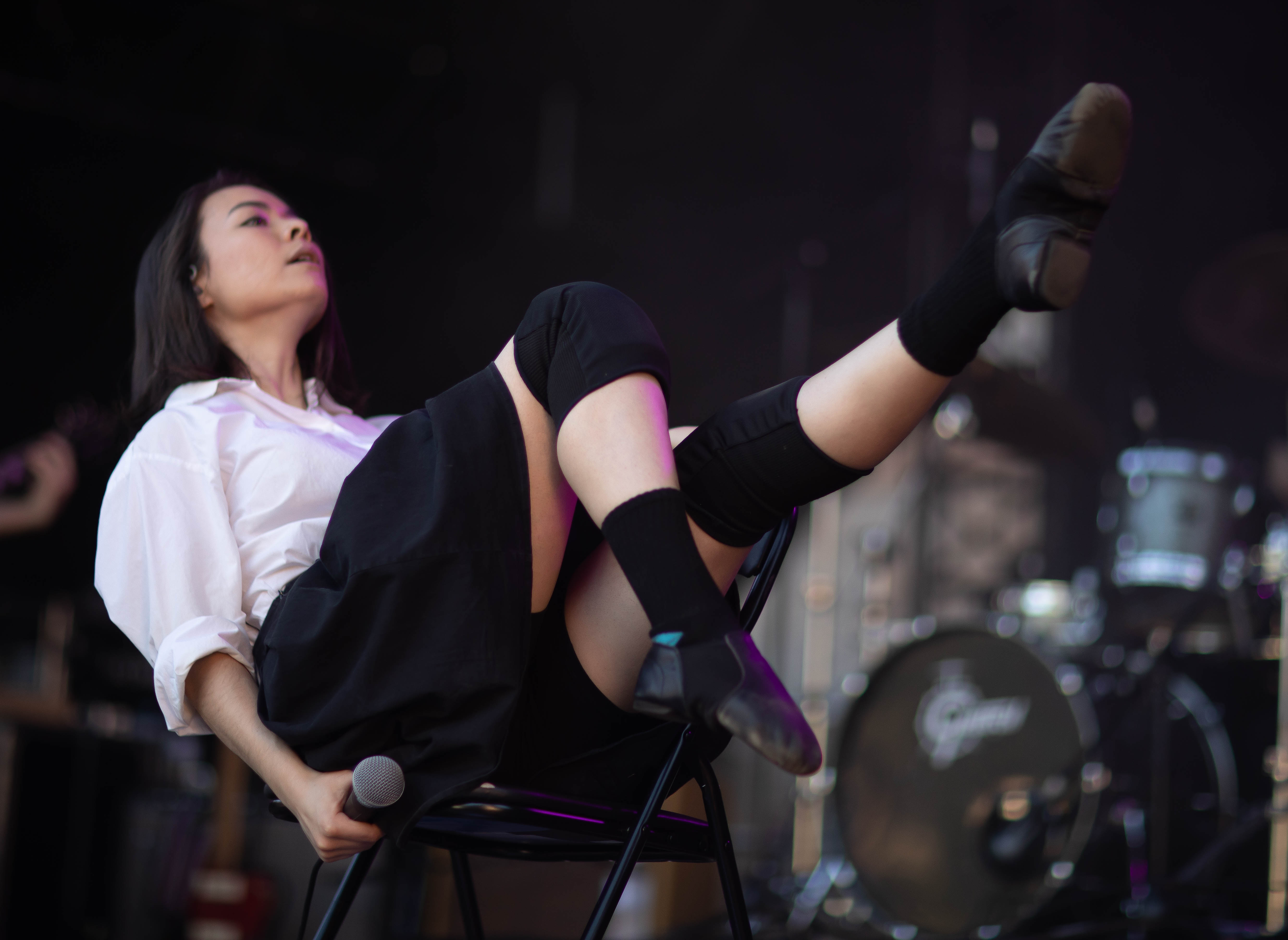
Mitski performing at St Jerome's Laneway Festival in Melbourne, Australia, in February 2019.

Reviewing the song, Jillian Mapes of Pitchfork praised the song's empowering theme, believing it to be realistic and universal. Mapes also gave the song the "Best New Track" award. In a review of Puberty 2, Ciara Dolan of Consequence of Sound called the song one of the "Essential Tracks" from its parent album. Katie Rife of A.V. Club lauded the track, stating that it was a "a powerful assertion of cultural identity and self-acceptance". Writing for Stereogum, Tom Breihan called "Your Best American Girl" a "[moment] of great rock catharsis". Ryan E.C. Hamm of Under the Radar complimented the song's lyricism, guitars, and feedback, stating that the recording "[harks] back to the very best of alternative rock of the early '90s".

=== Accolades ===
Including the song on their "30 Best Songs of 2016 So Far" list, Rolling Stone stated that the song "tightrope [walked] the chasm between romantic ideals and cultural reality to make for breathtaking music". "Your Best American Girl" was voted the fifth-best song of 2016 in The Village Voice's 44th annual Pazz & Jop critic's poll.

Several publications placed "Your Best American Girl" on their respective year-end singles lists. Ranking the song the second best of 2016, NPR wrote that the "song is brilliant for many reasons", but most notably because "[of] the way it forces us each to conjure up our 'all-American boy' and then take issue with the fact that coming up with a picture of him was so easy". Also ranking the song the second best of 2016, Paste described the song as an "angst-ridden anthem about an identity crisis". Rating the "Your Best American Girl" the sixteenth best song of the year, Pitchfork called the track was "universally resonant and personally specific".

Multiple publications also placed "Your Best American Girl" on decade-end or all-time singles lists. NPR placed it 16th on their list of the 200 Greatest Songs By 21st Century Women+, and Billboard included it in their list of 100 Songs that Defined the 2010s. Pitchfork also listed it 7th on their list of the 200 Best Songs of the 2010s. Opinion Police cited the track as the 2nd Best Song of the 2010s.

== Music video ==
The music video was produced by Zia Anger and released on April 13, 2016. The video features Mitski meeting a stereotypical American man where they begin waving and smiling at each other, and then an American woman comes along and the man immediately forgets about Mitski and begins passionately kissing with the woman while Mitski makes out with her own hand.

According to Mitski, the video "plays on the idea of, as a Japanese girl, never quite fitting in with the genre's surplus of white American guys." Billboard has said of the video "if the arrangement played with male-centric tropes, the music video was more of an ode to women that came before her." Cinematographer Ashley Connor has stated that the video intentionally references videos from artist PJ Harvey videos "the sort of ‘woman with guitar and nothing else in a white space."

Describing the production of the video, Connor has said the following:

“And at the end of the take, the entire crew, everybody just stopped and clapped for her. Zia and I just kind of looked at each other like, ‘F--k yeah, man. That's how you do it.’”

== Track listings ==
- Digital download
1. "Your Best American Girl" – 3:32

== Release history ==
| Country | Date | Format | Label |
|---|---|---|---|
| Worldwide | March 1, 2016 | Digital download; streaming | Dead Oceans |
