= Happy (Mitski song) =

2016 song by Mitski

Single by Mitski

from the album Puberty 2
- Released: May 3, 2016
- Studio: Acme, Westchester, New York
- Genre: Indie rock; neofolk; chamber pop
- Length: 3:40
- Label: Dead Oceans
- Songwriter: Mitski
- Producer: Patrick Hyland

Mitski singles chronology
"Your Best American Girl" (2016)	"Happy" (2016)	"Between The Breaths" (2018)

Music video
- "Happy" on YouTube

"Happy" is a song by American singer Mitski, released in 2016 as the second single from her fourth studio album, Puberty 2. A music video for the song was released on May 23 that year, which Paste described as "chilling", while Vice called it "anything but happy".

Stereogum wrote "Sonically, the song follows an opposite trajectory, building from eerie metallic clattering and mournful whispers to an exultant explosion of guitar and saxophone. By the end, though, the excitement has died down and the eerie clattering returns, as it always does."

== Background ==
About the song, Mitski said "Happiness fucks you. Once it's in your hands, you try to hold onto it, but the nature of happiness is that it passes through and eventually leaves, and something else—sadness, anger, a low after the high—has to follow. This song is about this exhaustive and exhausting cycle, and how sometimes one would rather not have any of it at all than be constantly thrown about by the waves of these fleeting states."

DIY wrote that the song is about "what happens once happiness has fled the scene; the tidying up, sadness, and exhausting anger that lives and thrives on the flip-side."

== Reception ==
Pitchfork wrote that "Happy" might be one of Mitski's bleakest songs yet, and further wrote "Mitski resists psychic death by constantly pushing forth into bolder textures, refusing to be meek and sedated even as joy feels compromised: a stubborn drum machine begets chuntering percussion, the tentative melody finds its feet, and brash saxophones push everything up a gear."

AllMusic considered the song to be one of the highlights from Puberty 2, writing that it's "full of bite and irony as she describes a hook-up and his stealthy exit in a context of grooving rhythms, a catchy melody, and poppy saxophone solos. Through it all in the background -- though it's brought to the fore in the intro and outro -- is the relentless pounding of a drum."
