= The Bechdel Cast =

Comedy podcast

- Genre: Comedy
- Language: English

Cast and voices
- Hosted by: Caitlin Durante and Jamie Loftus

Technical specifications
- Audio format: Podcasting (via streaming or download)

Publication
- No. of episodes: 526 episodes, plus 219 episodes on Patreon
- Original release: November 27, 2016
- Provider: iHeartRadio Network
- Updates: Weekly on Thursdays and twice a month on Patreon

Related
- Website: www.iheart.com/podcast/105-the-bechdel-cast-30089535/

The Bechdel Cast is a weekly podcast about the representation of women in film. It is named after the Bechdel test. The Bechdel Cast is hosted by Los Angeles–based comedians Caitlin Durante and Jamie Loftus.

In November 2016 The Bechdel Cast released their introductory episode titled "Welcome to The Bechdel Cast!" Their first episode was on the film Kill Bill with guest Zach Sherwin.

The show is broadcast on the iHeartRadio Network (after HowStuffWorks Network, under Stuff Media, was bought by iHeartMedia). Episodes are available on iTunes, Stitcher Radio, SoundCloud, and Spotify. Select episodes are released to supporters on the crowdfunding platform Patreon twice a month.

== Premise ==
The name of the podcast derives from cartoonist Alison Bechdel, who developed the concept of the Bechdel test, sometimes called the Bechdel–Wallace test. The test investigates whether or not a work includes at least two women conversing about a topic other than a man. Sometimes a requirement that the two women must have names is added, which is a rule the podcast adheres to. For the purposes of the show, the exchange only needs to be two lines of dialogue. A commonality of many movies that pass is that often only this minimum is reached typically by an inconsequential conversation or one in which the two lines are nested within a larger conversation that is about men.

The hosts often discuss the limitations of the Bechdel Test and, despite using it as their namesake, primarily employ it to initiate a larger discussion about the depiction and uses of female-identifying characters in film. The hosts have recently moved to a use of the test that looks at whether a film has two named characters of any marginalized gender, who have a conversation about anything other than a man, for two lines of dialogue, and increasingly lines must be relevant or central to the plot.

They occasionally reference and utilize similar tests of representation, such as the Vito Russo test, the DuVernay Test, and the Mako Mori Test.

== Format and structure ==
The podcast is informally comedic, and formatted in an improvisational style. They frequently mention supplemental running jokes, such as Loftus' obsession with actor Alfred Molina, and Durante's reminder of their master's degree in Screenwriting from Boston University.

The hosts begin by introducing their guest, often a comedian, actor, or other media personality. Durante then briefly recaps the film at the top of the episode with interjections from Loftus and the guest. This is followed by analyzing and discussing the representation of women through an intersectional lens, alternating in tone between serious and jocular.

At the end of each episode, they determine whether or not the film passes the Bechdel test, as well as rate it on a "nipple scale" from 0 to 5 nipples based on how marginalized genders are portrayed overall.

Episodes typically range from 45 minutes to 80 minutes, and are released once a week on Thursdays and additional episodes a month on Patreon. Most episodes are recorded in the HowStuffWorks studio in Los Angeles. Since 2018 they have begun touring and performing for studio audiences as The Bechdel Cast, which include live episodes such as "The Notebook with Caitlin Gill" and "Edward Scissorhands with Maggie Mae Fish".

== Hosts ==
Caitlin Durante is a comedian and producer. They were the program producer for the Nerdmelt Showroom comedy venue at Meltdown Comics in Los Angeles from early 2015 until it closed in April 2018. They are also a scriptwriter and story analyst, and frequently offer writing workshops in Los Angeles and Boston.

Jamie Loftus is an author, sketch writer, animator, and actor. Her comedic style can best be described as alternative comedy, with absurd pieces such as her one-woman show "I Lost My Virginity August 15, 2010" and her attempt to raise money for Planned Parenthood by selling Shrek nudes. She has also written and starred in video content for media sites Adult Swim, Comedy Central, Paste, and Super Deluxe.

== Criticism and Reception ==
Early reviews of the show characterized it as a "roast of your favourite movie".

The tone of the podcast has evolved over the years as the hosts have become more educated on Intersectional feminist issues and episodes have taken on more serious films about or by marginalized people, with earlier episodes having been more flippant in their comedic style. Due to the evolution of the show, some reviewers have suggested new listeners try out the podcast by starting with later episodes such as the one covering Black Panther.

The podcast has appeared on multiple lists for top podcasts in the realm of feminist film review.

== Episodes ==
Episode #	Date aired	Title	Guest	Bechdel Test	Nipple Rating: Durante, Loftus, Guest	Total Nipples
1	November 27, 2016	Welcome to the Bechdel Cast!	None	N/A	N/A	N/A
2	December 1, 2016	Kill Bill	Zach Sherwin	Yes	No ratings given	N/A
3	December 8, 2016	Beauty and the Beast (1991)	Courtney Karwal	No	2 (L)	N/A
4	December 15, 2016	Star Wars: A New Hope	Sam Jay	No	2 (D); 1 (L); 1.5 (G)	4.5
5	December 22, 2016	Love Actually	Debra DiGiovanni	Yes	.5 (D); .5 (L); .5 (G)	1.5
6	December 29, 2016	The Matrix	Matt Donaher	Yes	3.5 (D); 3 (L); 3 (G)	9.5
7	January 5, 2017	Labyrinth	Jenny Zigrino	Yes	1.5 (D); 2 (L); 3 (G)	6.5
8	January 12, 2017	The Princess Bride	Myq Kaplan	No	2 (D); 1 (L); 1.5 (G)	4.5
9	January 19, 2017	Mad Max: Fury Road	Will Weldon	Yes	3.75 (D); 3 (L); 4 (G)	10.75
10	January 26, 2017	Fargo	Julia Prescott	Yes	4.5 (D); 4.5 (L); 4.5 (G)	13.5
11	February 2, 2017	Groundhog Day	Jackie Kashian	Yes	2 (D); 3 (L); 2.5 (G)	7.5
12	February 9, 2017	Batman (1989)	Riley Silverman	No	.5 (D); 1 (L); .5 (G)	2
13	February 14, 2017	Titanic	Aparna Nancherla	Yes	4 (D); 4 (L); 4 (G)	12
14	February 23, 2017	Heathers	Paige Weldon	Yes	2.5 (D); 3 (L); 3 (G)	8.5
15	March 2, 2017	Single White Female	Ben Rodgers	Yes	4 (D); 4 (L); 4 (G)	12
16	March 9, 2017	Runaway Bride	Sophia Benoit	Yes	2 (D); 2.5 (L); 3 (G)	7.5
17	March 16, 2017	Coming to America	Amanda Seales	Yes	3 (D); 3.5 (L); 4 (G)	10.5
18	March 23, 2017	Gigli	Josh Fadem	Yes	1 (D); 1 (L); 1 (G)	3
19	March 30, 2017	Moana	Natalie Baseman	Yes	5 (D); 5 (L); 5 (G)	15
20	April 6, 2017	Boogie Nights	Josh Androsky	Yes	3.5 (D); 3.5 (L); 5 (G)	12
21	April 13, 2017	Hidden Figures	Nina Daniels	Yes	5 (D); 5 (L); 5 (G)	15
22	April 20, 2017	Clueless	Nikki Glaser	Yes	3.5 (D); 4 (L); 4 (G)	11.5
23	April 27, 2017	The Sandlot	Natalie Palamides	No	0 (D); 0 (L); 0 (G)	0
24	May 4, 2017	Spice World	Amanda Meadows	Yes	2 (D); 2.5 (L); 2.5 (G)	7
25	May 11, 2017	Thelma & Louise	Alexi Wasser	Yes	5 (D); 5 (L); 5 (G)	15
26	May 16, 2017	Alien (1979)	Eliza Skinner	Yes	4 (D); 4 (L); 5 (G)	13
27	May 22, 2017	Dirty Dancing (1987)	Emily Ruskowski	Yes	4 (D); 4 (L); 4.5 (G)	12.5
28	May 25, 2017	Pirates of the Caribbean (2003)	Ashley Brooke Roberts	No	2 (D); 2 (L); 1.75 (G)	5.75
29	June 1, 2017	Mean Girls	Jenny Jaffe	Yes	3 (D); 3.5 (L); 5 (G)	11.5
30	June 8, 2017	Wonder Woman (2017)	Jessica Chobot	Yes	5 (D); 4.5 (L); 4 (G)	13.5
31	June 12, 2017	The Mummy (1999)	Georgea Brooks	No	2 (D); 2 (L); 1 (G)	5
32	June 15, 2017	The Wizard of Oz	Ever Mainard	Yes	5 (D); 5 (L); 5 (G)	15
33	June 22, 2017	Transformers (2007)	Teresa Lee	No	.5 (D); 0 (L); 1 (G)	1.5
34	June 29, 2017	Harry Potter And The Sorcerer's Stone	Maggie Maye	No	3 (D); 3 (L); 3 (G)	9
35	July 6, 2017	Spider-Man 2	Sina Grace	No	1 (D); 1.5 (L); 1 (G)	3.5
36	July 13, 2017	The Beguiled (2017)	Alana Hope Levinson	Yes	2 (D); 2 (L); 0 (G)	4
37	July 20, 2017	Ghost (1990)	Nicole Byer	No	4 (D); 4 (L); 5 (G)	13
38	July 27, 2017	When Harry Met Sally...	Naomi Ekperigin	No	1 (D); 1 (L); 1 (G)	3
39	August 3, 2017	Butch Cassidy and the Sundance Kid	Caitlin Gill	No	1 (D); 1.5 (L); 3 (G)	5.5
40	August 10, 2017	Twilight	JT Taylor	Yes	1 (D); 1.5 (L); 1.5 (G)	4
41	August 17, 2017	Jurassic Park (1993)	Steven Ray Morris	Yes	3.5 (D); 3 (L); 3 (G)	9.5
42	August 24, 2017	School of Rock	Nina Corcoran	Yes	2.5 (D); 3.5 (L); 4 (G)	10
43	August 31, 2017	The Room	Barbara Gray	Yes	0 (D); 1.5 (L); 2 (G)	3.5
44	September 7, 2017	Grease 2	Solomon Georgio	Yes	2 (D); 3 (L); 3 (G)	8
45	September 14, 2017	Men in Black	Sam Ike	No	.5 (D); .5 (L); .5 (G)	1.5
46	September 21, 2017	A League of Their Own	Julia Claire	Yes	4 (D); 4 (L); 5 (G)	13
47	September 28, 2017	Flatliners (1990)	Matt McCarthy	Yes	2 (D); 2 (L); 2.5 (G)	6.5
48	October 5, 2017	Blade Runner	Hampton Yount	No	1.5 (D); 1 (L); 2 (G)	4.5
49	October 12, 2017	Friday the 13th (1980)	Jen Saunderson	Yes	2 (D); 3 (L); 3 (G)	8
50	October 19, 2017	Beetlejuice	Mike Abrusci	Yes	2.5 (D); 2 (L); 3 (G)	7.5
51	October 23, 2017	Manhattan	None	Yes	No ratings given	N/A
52	October 26, 2017	Hocus Pocus	Danielle Perez	Yes	3.5 (D); 4 (L); 4 (G)	11.5
53	November 2, 2017	V for Vendetta	Marcella Arguello	Yes	3 (D); 3.5 (L); 3 (G)	9.5
54	November 9, 2017	Shrek	Atsuko Okatsuka	No	1 (D); 1 (L); 1 (G)	3
55	November 16, 2017	The Craft	Suzee Dunn	Yes	2.5 (D); 2.5 (L); 2.5 (G)	7.5
56	November 23, 2017	Thanksgiving Minisode	None	N/A	N/A	N/A
57	November 30, 2017	The Phantom of the Opera (2004)	Lindsay Ellis	No	0 (D); 2 (L); 2 (G)	4
58	December 7, 2017	A Christmas Story	Brandon Bird	Yes	1.5 (D); 1.5 (L); 2 (G)	5
59	December 14, 2017	The Holiday	Rebecca Bulnes	Yes	.5 (D); 1 (L); 2 (G)	3.5
60	December 21, 2017	Die Hard	Debra DiGiovanni	Yes	1.5 (D); 2.5 (L); 1 (G)	5
61	December 28, 2017	Star Wars: The Force Awakens	Demi Adejuyigbe	Yes	3 (D); 3 (L); 3 (G)	9
62	January 4, 2018	Mrs. Doubtfire	Emily Heller	Yes	2.5 (D); 3 (L); 2.5 (G)	8
63	January 11, 2018	Pulp Fiction	Jake Weisman	Yes	2 (D); 2 (L); 2 (G)	6
64	January 18, 2018	Snow White and the Seven Dwarfs	Jack O'Brien	Yes	0 (D); .5 (L); 0 (G)	.5
65	January 25, 2018	The Post	Lizz Winstead	No	2.5 (D); 2 (L); 2 (G)	6.5
66	February 1, 2018	Girls Trip	Madison Shepard	Yes	4.5 (D); 4.5 (L); 5 (G)	14
67	February 8, 2018	Lady Bird	Charla Lauriston	Yes	5 (D); 5 (L); 5 (G)	15
68	February 14, 2018	Fifty Shades of Grey	Sara Schaefer	Yes	1 (D); 2 (L); 2 (G)	5
69	February 22, 2018	The Notebook	Caitlin Gill	No	2.5 (D); 2.5 (L); 2 (G)	7
70	March 1, 2018	Black Panther	Naomi Ekperigin and Ify Nwadiwe	Yes	5 (D); 4.5 (L); 5 (G-E); 5 (G-N)	14.5 (W) 19.5 (C)
71	March 8, 2018	Josie and the Pussycats	Faye Orlove	Yes	4 (D); 3.5 (L); 5 (G)	12.5
72	March 15, 2018	Lara Croft: Tomb Raider	Dani Fernandez	No	1.5 (D); 1.5 (L); 2 (G)	5
73	March 22, 2018	Pacific Rim	Aristotle Acevedo	No	3 (D); 2 (L); 3 (G)	8
74	March 29, 2018	Amélie	Hana Michels	Yes	2 (D); 2 (L); 2.5 (G)	6.5
75	April 5, 2018	Mother!	Anna Akana	No	0 (D); 0 (L); [-]2 (G)	[-]2
76	April 12, 2018	The Rock	Miles Gray	No	0 (D); 0 (L); 0 (G)	0
77	April 19, 2018	She's All That	Anna Hossnieh	Yes	0 (D); 1 (L); 1 (G)	2
78	April 26, 2018	Jumanji (1995) and Jumanji: Welcome to the Jungle (2017)	Bodie Reed	Yes/Yes	2/2 (D); 2/2 (L); 2/2 (G)	6/6
79	May 3, 2018	Moulin Rouge!	Daniel O'Brien	Yes	1.5 (D); 1 (L); 1.5 (G)	4
80	May 10, 2018	But I'm a Cheerleader	Jenny Chalikian	Yes	4.5 (D); 4 (L); 5 (G)	13.5
81	May 17, 2018	Eternal Sunshine of the Spotless Mind	Kate Banford	No	3.5 (D); 4 (L); 4 (G)	11.5
82	May 24, 2018	Frozen	Chris Farren	Yes	3.75 (D); 3 (L); 3 (G)	9.75
83	May 31, 2018	Aliens (1986)	Andrew Ti	Yes	4 (D); 4 (L) (G)	12 (W) 8 (C)
84	June 7, 2018	Ocean's Eleven	Edgar Momplaisir	No	0 (D); 0 (L); 5 (G)	5
85	June 14, 2018	The Royal Tenenbaums	Jenny Yang	Yes	1.5 (D); 1 (L); 1 (G)	3.5
86	June 21, 2018	Breakfast at Tiffany's	Gabe Dunn	Yes	1 (D); 2.5 (L); 3 (G)	6.5
87	June 28, 2018	Her	Jesse David Fox	Yes	1.5 (D); 2 (L); 2 (G)	5.5
88	July 5, 2018	The Sisterhood of the Traveling Pants	Mary Houlihan	Yes	3.5 (D); 3.5 (L); 3 (G)	10
89	July 12, 2018	Bend It Like Beckham	Subhah Agarwal	Yes	4.5 (D); 4.5 (L); 4.8 (G)	13.8
90	July 19, 2018	Aladdin	Shereen Lani Younes	No	1.5 (D); 1.5 (L); 1 (G)	4
91	July 26, 2018	Mission: Impossible (1996)	Alex Schmidt	No	.5 (D); 1 (L); 1 (G)	2.5
92	August 2, 2018	Wet Hot American Summer	Allison Raskin	No	2.5 (D); 3 (L); 3.5 (G)	9
93	August 9, 2018	Point Break (1991)	Anita Sarkeesian	No	.5 (D); 1 (L); 1 (G)	2.5
94	August 16, 2018	500 Days of Summer	Brandie Posey	No	1 (D); 0 (L); 0 (G)	1
95	August 23, 2018	Mamma Mia!	Miel Bredouw	Yes	2.5 (D); 3 (L); 3 (G)	8.5
96	August 30, 2018	Crazy Rich Asians	Teresa Lee and Ceda Xiong	Yes	4.5 (D); 4.5 (L) 4.25 (G-L); 5 (G-X)	13.63 (W) 18.25 (C)
97	September 6, 2018	10 Things I Hate About You	Laci Mosley	Yes	1.5 (D); 1.5 (L); 1.5 (G)	4.5
98	September 12, 2018	The Lord of the Rings Trilogy - Part 1	Anna Salinas	N/A	N/A	N/A
99	September 13, 2018	The Lord of the Rings Trilogy - Part 2	Anna Salinas	No	.5 (D); .1 (L) .25 (G)	.85
100	September 20, 2018	Edward Scissorhands	Maggie Mae Fish	Yes	2 (D); 2 (L); 2 (G)	6
101	September 27, 2018	She's the Man	Samee Junio	Yes	3 (D); 3.5 (L); 3.5 (G)	10
102	October 4, 2018	Carrie (1976)	Eva Vives	Yes	2.5 (D); 2.5 (L); 2 (G)	7
103	October 11, 2018	Raiders of the Lost Ark - 100 Episode Spectacular!	None	No	.25 (D) .25 (L) N/A (G)	.75 (W) .5 (C)
104	October 16, 2018	A Star Is Born (2018)	Anna Hossnieh	Yes	2 (D); 1.5 (L); 2 (G)	5.5
105	October 18, 2018	Halloween (1978)	April Wolfe	Yes	2.5 (D); 2 (L); 3 (G)	7.5
106	October 25, 2018	Scream	Joan Ford	Yes	3 (D); 3 (L); 4 (G)	10
107	November 1, 2018	Cruel Intentions	Jackie Johnson	Yes	0 (D); [-]1 (L); 0 (G)	[-]1
108	November 6, 2018	Election	Natasha Chandel	Yes	2.5 (D); 3.5 (L); 3 (G)	9
109	November 15, 2018	Gentleman Prefer Blondes	Karina Longworth	Yes	2 (D); 3.5 (L); 4 (G)	9.5
110	November 22, 2018	Thanksgiving Minisode	None	N/A	N/A	N/A
111	November 29, 2018	Miss Congeniality	None	Yes	3 (D); 3.75 (L); N/A (G)	10.13 (W) 6.75 (C)
112	December 6, 2018	The Nightmare Before Christmas	Natalie McGill	No	.5 (D); .5 (L); [-]2 (G)	[-]1
113	December 13, 2018	Gremlins	Moujan Zolfaghari	No	.5 (D); .5 (L); .5 (G)	1.5
114	December 20, 2018	Elf	Mara Wilson	No	.5 (D); 1 (L); 1.5 (G)	3
115	December 27, 2018	Waiting to Exhale	Errin Haines Whack	Yes	2.5 (D); 2.5 (L); 2 (G)	7
116	January 3, 2019	The Princess Diaries	Marcia Belsky	Yes	2 (D); 3 (L); 3.5 (G)	8.5
117	January 10, 2019	Erin Brockovich	Alfred Molina	Yes	3.5 (D); 4 (L); 3 (G)	10.5
118	January 17, 2019	The Fifth Element	Danielle Radford	No	.5 (D); .5 (L); 1 (G)	2
119	January 24, 2019	My Big Fat Greek Wedding	George Civeris	Yes	2 (D); 3.5 (L); 5 (G)	10.5
120	January 31, 2019	Fatal Attraction	Soraya Chemaly	Yes	0 (D); 0 (L); 0 (G)	0
121	February 7, 2019	What Women Want	Laci Mosley	No	0 (D); 0 (L); 1 (G)	1
122	February 14, 2019	D.E.B.S.	Ellie Brigida and Leigh Holmes Foster	Yes	4 (D); 3.75 (L); 3.5 (G-B) 3.5 (G-HF)	11.25 (W) 14.75 (C)
123	February 21, 2019	Romy and Michelle's High School Reunion	Danielle Perez	Yes	3 (D); 3 (L); 5 (G)	11
124	February 28, 2019	The Breakfast Club	None	Yes	1.5 (D); .5 (L); N/A (G)	3 (W) 2 (C)
125	March 7, 2019	The Devil Wears Prada	Amy Lam	Yes	2 (D); 2 (L); 3.5 (G)	7.5
126	March 14, 2019	Captain Marvel	Carolyn Cocca	Yes	4.5 (D); 4 (L); 4.25 (G)	12.75
127	March 21, 2019	Fight Club	Katie Nguyen	No	0 (D); 0 (L); 0 (G)	0
128	March 28, 2019	The Little Mermaid	Clara Pluton	Yes	.5 (D); .5 (L); 1 (G)	2
129	April 4, 2019	Rosemary's Baby	Jessica Harper	Yes	2.5 (D); 2.5 (L); 2.5 (G)	7.5
130	April 11, 2019	Sleepless in Seattle	Andy Iwancio	Yes	.5 (D); 1.5 (L); 2 (G)	4
131	April 18, 2019	40 Days and 40 Nights	Arielle Isaac Norman	No	[-]40/[-]40 (D); [-]40/[-]40 (L); (G)	[-]120/[-]120 (W) [-]80/[-]80 (C)
132	April 25, 2019	The Avengers	Anney Reese	No	1.5 (D); 1.5 (L); 1.5 (G)	4.5
133	May 2, 2019	Pleasantville	Jessie Maltin and Leonard Maltin	Yes	3 (D); 4 (L); 4 (G-JM) 4 (G-LM)	11 (W) 15 (C)
134	May 9, 2019	Casino Royale	Kenice Mobley	No	0 (D); .5 (L); .5 (G)	1
135	May 16, 2019	Bring It On	Maggie Maye	Yes	2 (D); 2.5 (L); 2 (G)	6.5
136	May 23, 2019	Paddington & Paddington 2	Demi Adejuyigbe	Yes/No	3 (D); 3 (L); 3 (G)	9
137	May 30, 2019	13 Going on 30	Melissa Lozada-Oliva	Yes	2.5 (D); 2.5 (L); 4 (G)	9
138	June 6, 2019	Carol	Lauren Flans and Nicole Pacent	Yes	4 (D); 4 (L); 4 (G-F) 3 (G-P)	11.5 (W) 15 (C)
139	June 13, 2019	Booksmart	Vanessa Chester	Yes	4.25 (D); 3.75 (L); 3.75 (G)	11.75
140	June 20, 2019	Toy Story	Sadie Dupuis	No	.5 (D); .5 (L); .7 (G)	1.7
141	June 27, 2019	Love, Simon	Matt Rogers	No	3.5 (D); 4 (L); 5 (G)	12.5
142	July 4, 2019	Independence Day	Lindsay Ellis	Yes	.5 (D); 1 (L); 2 (G)	3.5
143	July 11, 2019	It Takes Two	Catherine Cohen and Pat Regan	Yes	1 (D); 1 (L); 1 (G-C) 2 (G-R)	3.5 (W) 5 (C)
144	July 18, 2019	Lion King (1994)	Naomi Ekperigin	No	.5 (D); .5 (L); .5 (G)	1.5
145	July 25, 2019	First Wives Club	Caitlin Gill	Yes	3 (D); 3 (L); 4 (G)	10
146	August 1, 2019	The Fast and the Furious	Faye Orlove	Yes	.5 (D); 1 (L); 2.5 (G)	4
147	August 8, 2019	A Little Princess	Joelle Monique	Yes	3.5 (D); 3.5 (L); 3.5 (G)	10.5
148	August 15, 2019	Anastasia	Anna Seregina	Yes	3 (D); 3.5 (L); 2.5 (G)	10
149	August 22, 2019	Good Will Hunting	Ayo Edebiri	No	1 (D); .5 (L); 0 (G)	1.5
150	August 29, 2019	There's Something About Mary	Katy Stoll	Yes	0 (D); [-]2 (L); 0 (G)	[-]2
151	September 5, 2019	Spy Kids	Katherine Leon	Yes	3 (D); 3.5 (L); 4 (G)	10.5
152	September 12, 2019	Sex and the City	Megan Gailey	Yes	1.5 (D); .5 (L); 2 (G)	4
153	September 19, 2019	Frances Ha	Christina Catherine Martinez	Yes	3.5 (D); 4 (L); 4 (G)	11.5
154	September 26, 2019	The Hunger Games	Kelly Nugent and Lindsay Katai	Yes	3 (D); 3.5 (L); 3.75 (G-N) 4 (G-K)	10.38 (W) 14.25 (C)
155	October 3, 2019	The Dark Knight	Pallavi Gunalan	Yes	.5 (D); .5 (L); .5 (G)	1.5
156	October 10, 2019	The Addams Family	Dani Fernandez and Ify Nwadiwe	Yes	3.5 (D); 3.5 (L); 4 (G-F) 3.5 (G-N)	10.75 (W) 14.5 (C)
157	October 17, 2019	Practical Magic	None	Yes	3.25 (D); 3.25 (L) N/A (G)	9.75 (W) 6.5 (C)
158	October 24, 2019	Rocky Horror Picture Show	Joan Haley Ford	No	1.5 (D); 1.5 (L) 1.5 (G)	4.5
159	October 31, 2019	The Shining	Corie Johnson	No	2.5 (D); 2 (L) 2 (G)	6.5
160	November 7, 2019	Easy A	Isa Mazzei	Yes	2.5 (D); 2.5 (L) 2.5 (G)	7.5
161	November 14, 2019	Charlie's Angels	Sasheer Zamata	Yes	1.5 (D); 1 (L); 2 (G)	4.5
162	November 21, 2019	Brave	Rachel Anne Clarke	Yes	3.75 (D); 3.75 (L); 3 (G)	10.5
163	November 28, 2019	Thanksgiving Mini Episode	None	N/A	N/A	N/A
164	December 5, 2019	The Terminator & Terminator 2: Judgment Day	None	Yes/No	1.5/3 (D); 1/4 (L); N/A (G)	3.75/10.5 (W) 2.5/7 (C)
165	December 12, 2019	Home Alone	Tamara Yajia	No	1.5 (D); 1.5 (L); 2 (G)	5
166	December 19, 2019	The Santa Clause Part 1	Grace Thomas	N/A	N/A	N/A
167	December 20, 2019	The Santa Clause Part 2	Grace Thomas	No	.5 (D); 1.5 (L); 2 (G)	4
168	December 26, 2019	Little Women (1994)	Debra DiGiovanni	Yes	3.75 (D); 3.5 (L); 3.5 (G)	10.75
169	January 2, 2020	Q&A with Jamie and Caitlin	None	N/A	N/A	N/A
170	January 9, 2020	Now and Then	Callie Biggerstaff	Yes	4 (D); 4 (L); 4 (G)	12
171	January 16, 2020	Cats (2019)	Katie Goldin	Yes	2.5 (D); 3 (L); 2 (G)	7.5
172	January 23, 2020	Bad Boys (1995)	Laci Mosley	Yes	.25 (D); .5 (L); .5 (G)	1.25
173	January 30, 2020	Fast Times at Ridgemont High	Paige Weldon and Emily Faye	No	2 (D); 1.5 (L); 2 (G-W) 3 (G-F)	6 (W) 8.5 (C)
174	February 6, 2020	Sister Act	Nithya Raman	Yes	4.5 (D); 4.5 (L); 5 (G)	14
175	February 13, 2020	Love & Basketball	Zainab Johnson	Yes	3.75 (D); 3.75 (L); 4 (G)	11.5
176	February 20, 2020	Center Stage	Akilah Hughes	Yes	2.5 (D); 2.5 (L); 2 (G)	7
177	February 27, 2020	The Princess and the Frog	Lexie Grace	Yes	1.5 (D); 1.5 (L); 1.5 (G)	4.5
178	March 5, 2020	The Social Network	Demi Adejuyigbe	No	.5 (D); .5 (L); .5 (G)	1.5
179	March 12, 2020	The Sixth Sense	None	Yes	1.5 (D); 1.5 (L); N/A (G)	3
180	March 19, 2020	Black Swan	Hunter Harris	Yes	2.5 (D); 3.5 (L); 4 (G)	10
181	March 26, 2020	Mulan	Ceda Xiong	No	3 (D); 3.5 (L); 3 (G)	9.5
182	April 2, 2020	National Treasure	None	No	.5 (D); .5 (L); N/A (G)	1
183	April 9, 2020	Austin Powers: International Man of Mystery	Atsuko Okatsuka	No	0 (D); 0 (L); [-]1 (G)	[-]1
184	April 16, 2020	All About Eve	Sara June	Yes	3 (D); 3.75 (L); 4 (G)	10.75
185	April 23, 2020	Clue	None	No	1.5 (D); 1.5 (L); N/A (G)	3
186	April 30, 2020	Wayne's World	Maureen Bharoocha	No	1.5 (D); 1.5 (L); 2 (G)	5
187	May 7, 2020	Bad Moms	None	Yes	2 (D); 2 (L); N/A (G)	4
188	May 14, 2020	Little Miss Sunshine	None	Yes	3.5 (D); 3.5 (L); N/A (G)	7
189	May 21, 2020	Birds of Prey	Emily Yoshida	Yes	4.5 (D); 4.25 (L); 4.25 (G)	13
190	May 28, 2020	Legally Blonde	None	Yes	3 (D); 2.5 (L); N/A (G)	8.25 (W) 5.5 (C)
191	June 4, 2020	Black Lives Matter	None	N/A	N/A	N/A
192	June 11, 2020	Updates, Improvements, and a Discussion	Kenice Mobley	N/A	N/A	N/A
193	June 18, 2020	Harriet the Spy	Jenna Ushkowitz	Yes	4 (D); 4 (L); 4 (G)	12
194	June 25, 2020	Tangerine	Kai Choyce, Violet Gray, and Dahile Belle	Yes	4.5 (D); 4.25 (L); 4 (G-C)	12.75
195	July 9, 2020	Set It Off	Jourdain Searles	Yes	4 (D); 4 (L); 4 (G)	12
196	July 16, 2020	The Witch	Jana Schmieding	Yes	1 (D); 1 (L); 1 (G)	3
197	July 23, 2020	Space Jam	Princess Weekes	No	1 (D); 1.5 (L); 2 (G)	4.5
198	July 30, 2020	Cheetah Girls	Korama Danquah	Yes	4 (D); 4 (L); 3.5 (G)	11.5
199	August 6, 2020	Secretary	Ashley Ray	Yes	1 (D); 1.5 (L); 2 (G)	4.5
200	August 13, 2020	I, Tonya	None	Yes	5 (D); 4 (L); N/A (G)	13.5 (W) 9 (C)
201	August 20, 2020	Frozen II	Ali Nahdee	Yes	4 (D); 3.75 (L); 4 (G)	11.75
202	August 27, 2020	Fried Green Tomatoes	Francesca Fiorentini	Yes	3 (D); 3 (L); 4 (G)	10
203	September 3, 2020	Inception	None	No	.5 (D); .5 (L); N/A (G)	1.5 (W) 1 (C)
204	September 10, 2020	Ghost World	Julie Klausner	Yes	2.5 (D); 2.5 (L); N/A (G)	7.5 (W) 5 (C)
205	September 17, 2020	Death Becomes Her	None	Yes	2 (D); 2 (L); N/A (G)	6 (W) 4 (C)
206	September 24, 2020	How Stella Got Her Groove Back	Kenice Mobley	Yes	4 (D); 4 (L); 4 (G)	12
207	October 1, 2020	Parasite	Grace Jung	Yes	3 (D); 3 (L); 2 (G)	8
208	October 8, 2020	The Descent	D'arby Rose	Yes	2.5 (D); 2.75 (L); 3 (G)	8.25
209	October 15, 2020	A Girl Walks Home Alone At Night	Anna Hossnieh	Yes	4.25 (D); 4.25 (L); 4.5 (G)	13
210	October 22, 2020	Us	Korama Danquah	Yes	3.5 (D); 4 (L); 4 (G)	11.5
211	October 29, 2020	Pan's Labyrinth	Aristotle Acevedo	Yes	3.75 (D); 3.75 (L); 4 (G)	11.5
212	November 5, 2020	Flubber	None	Yes	1 (D); .5 (L); N/A (G)	2.25 (W) 1.5 (C)
213	November 12, 2020	Saved!	Ellie Brigida and Leesa Charlotte	Yes	3.5 (D); 3.5 (L); 4 (G-B); 3.5 (G-C)	12.5 (W) 14.5 (C)
214	November 19, 2020	Lolita (1962)	None	N/A	[-]1,000,000 (D); [-]1,000,000 (L); N/A (G)	[-]3,000,000 (W) [-]2,000,000 (C)
215	November 26, 2020	Rhymes for Young Ghouls	Jess Murwin	Yes	5 (D); 5 (L); 5 (G)	15
216	December 3, 2020	Four Year Anniversary Q&A with Jamie and Caitlin	None	N/A	N/A	N/A
217	December 10, 2020	The Santa Clause 3: The Escape Clause	Grace Thomas	No	[-]4 (D); 0 (L); 4.5 (G)	.5
218	December 17, 2020	This Christmas	Miles Gray	Yes	3 (D); 3 (L); 3 (G)	9
219	December 24, 2020	Happiest Season	Jes Tom	Yes	2.5 (D); 2.5 (L); 1 (G)	6
220	December 31, 2020	New Year's Eve	None	Yes	0 (D); 0 (L); N/A (G)	0
221	January 7, 2021	We're Taking the Week Off and That's Feminist	None	N/A	N/A	N/A
222	January 14, 2021	Beauty and the Beast	None	No	2 (D); 1.5 (L); N/A (G)	5.25 (W) 3.5 (C)
223	January 21, 2021	Grease	Gracie Gillam	Yes	.5 (D); .5 (L); 1 (G)	2
224	January 28, 2021	Selena	Mala Muñoz	Yes	4 (D); 4 (L); 5 (G)	13
225	February 4, 2021	Hollywood Shuffle	Sam Ike	Yes	2.5 (D); 2.5 (L); 5 (G)	10
226	February 11, 2021	Cinderella (1997)	Keah Brown	Yes	3.5 (D); 4 (L); 5 (G)	12.5
227	February 18, 2021	Eve's Bayou	Bridget Todd	Yes	3.5 (D); 3. 5 (L); 3.75 (G)	10.75
228	February 25, 2021	Bedazzled	Laci Mosley	No	0 (D), 0 (L), 0 (G)	0
229	March 4, 2021	Bridget Jone's Diary	Amy Solomon	Yes	2 (D), 2 (L), 2(G)	6
230	March 11, 2021	Starship Troopers	Jonathan Braylock	Yes	.5 (D), 0 (L), 1.5 (G)	2
231	March 18, 2021	Stepford Wives (1975) and (2004)	Zoe Ligon	Yes (to both)	'75: 3/3.5 (D), 3.5 (L), 1.5 (G) '04: 1.5/2 (D), 1.5 (L), .5 (G)	8.25 ('75) 3.75 ('04)
232	March 25, 2021	Den of Thieves	Cerise Castle	No	0 (D), 0 (L), 0 (G)	0
233	April 1, 2021	The Human Centipede	None	Yes	6(D), 6(L), N/A (G)	18 (W) 12 (C)
234	April 8, 2021	He's Just Not That Into You	Anna LaMadrid	No	0 (D), 0 (L), 0(G)	0
235	April 15, 2021	To All the Boys I've Loved Before	Olivia Truffaut-Wong	Yes	4.25 (D), 4.25 (L), 4.25(G)	12.75
236	April 22, 2021	Promising Young Woman	Sierra Katow	Yes	4 (D), N/A(L), 4 (G)	12 (W) 8 (C)
237	April 29, 2021	Cadet Kelly	Keah Brown	Yes	1.5 (D), 2.75 (L), N/A(G)	6.38 (W) 4.25 (C)
238	May 6, 2021	Poetic Justice	Propaganda	Yes	2.5 (D), 2.5 (L), 2.75 (G)	7.75
239	May 13, 2021	The Full Monty	None	No	3 (D), 3 (L), N/A (G)	9 (W) 6 (C)
240	May 20, 2021	Crazy, Stupid, Love	Samee Junio	No	0 (D); 0 (L), 0 (G)	0
241	May 27, 2021	The Farewell	Atsuko Okatsuka	Yes	5 (D); 5 (L); 4 (G)	14
242	June 3, 2021	Portrait of a Lady on Fire	Chloé Cunha	Yes	4.5 (D); 4.5 (L); 4.5 (G)	13.5
243	June 10, 2021	The Watermelon Woman	Chrystel Oloukoï	Yes	5 (D); 5 (L); 5 (G)	15
244	June 17, 2021	To Wong Foo, Thanks for Everything! Julie Newmar	Jeena Bloom	Yes	2 (D); 2.5 (L); 3 (G)	7.5
245	June 24, 2021	The Handmaiden	Soyoung Cho	Yes	4.25 (D); 4 (L); 4 (G)	12.25
246	July 1, 2021	9 to 5	Sophie Lichterman	Yes	4.25 (D); 4.25 (L); 4.25 (G)	12.75
247	July 8, 2021	Atomic Blonde	Vanessa Guerrero	Yes	3 (D); 3 (L); 3.5 (G)	9.5
248	July 15, 2021	Barb and Star Go to Vista Del Mar	Kate Willett	Yes	4 (D); 4 (L); 3.5 (G)	11.5
249	July 22, 2021	Mystic Pizza	Hallie Bateman	Yes	2.75 (D); 3 (L); 3 (G)	8.75
250	July 29, 2021	Broadcast News	Dave Schilling	Yes	2.5 (D); 2.5 (L); 0 (G)	5
251	August 5, 2021	A Very Aack-Cast Takeover	None	N/A	N/A	N/A
252	August 5, 2021	Aackt 3: Cathy and American Feminist Backlash (Aack Cast episode)	None	N/A	N/A	N/A
253	August 12, 2021	Contact	Kelly McCormack	Yes	π(D); 3.25 (L); 4 (G)	10.391...
254	August 18, 2021	Chicago	None	Yes	3 (D); 4 (L); N/A (G)	10.5 (W) 7 (C)
255	August 26, 2021	Hustlers	Siouxsie Q	Yes	5 (D); 5 (L); 5 (G)	15
256	September 2, 2021	Speed	Shereen Lani Younes	Yes	1.5 (D); 1 (L); 1.5 (G)	4
257	September 9, 2021	A Walk to Remember	Sam Varela	Yes	1.5 (D); 1.5 (L); 2 (G)	5
258	September 16, 2021	Widows	Michael-Michelle Pratt	Yes	4 (D); 4 (L); 4 (G)	12
259	September 23, 2021	Alien Resurrection	Gracie Gillam	Yes	2.5 (D); 2.5 (L); 4 (G)	9
260	September 30, 2021	Matilda	Jess Murwin	Yes	2.5 (D); 2.5 (L); 2.5 (G)	7.5
261	October 7, 2021	Raw	Vanessa Guerrero	Yes	4.5 (D); 4.5 (L); 4.5 (G)	13.5
262	October 14, 2021	Buffy the Vampire Slayer	Jasmine Johnson	Yes	3.25 (D); 3.5 (L); 3.75 (G)	10.5
263	October 21, 2021	The Love Witch	Alyssa Onofreo	Yes	3 (D); 3.5 (L); 4 (G)	10.5
264	October 28, 2021	Coco	Dani Fernandez	Yes	4.5 (D); 4.5 (L); 5 (G)	14
265	November 4, 2021	Spanglish	Melissa Lozada Oliva	Yes	1.5 (D); 2 (L); 2.5 (G)	6
266	November 11, 2021	Shrek 2: The Five Year Anniversary Episode	None	No	.5 (D); .5 (L); N/A (G)	1.5 (W) 1 (C)
267	November 18, 2021	The Princess Switch 2: Switched Again	None	Yes	2 (D); 2 (L); N/A (G)	6 (W) 4 (C)
268	November 25, 2021	Aquaman	Ali Nahdee	Yes	3.5 (D); 3.5 (L); 3.5 (G)	10.5
269	December 2, 2021	Full-Court Miracle	Faye Orlove	No	2.5 (D); 2.5 (L); 3 (G)	8
270	December 9, 2021	The Santa Claus 2	Grace Freud	Yes	.5 (D); 5 (L); 5 (G)	10.5
271	December 16, 2021	Double Indemnity (1944)	Anita Sarkessian	Yes	.5 (D); .5 (L); .5 (G)	1.5
272	December 22, 2021	The Matrix	Emily St. James	Yes	4.5 (D); 4.5 (L); 5 (G)	14
273	December 30, 2021	A Week Off, Ever Heard Of It?	None	N/A	N/A	N/A
274	January 6, 2022	Jamie and Caitlin Answer Your Questions	None	N/A	N/A	N/A
275	January 13, 2022	A Simple Favor	Cate Young	Yes	3.5 (D); 4 (L); 3.5 (G)	11
276	January 20, 2022	Peggy Sue Got Married	Jackie Kashian	Yes	1.5 (D); 2 (L); 2.5 (G)	6
277	January 27, 2022	Basic Instinct	Sarah Marshall	No	1 (D); 1 (L); 1 (G)	3
278	February 3, 2022	She's Gotta Have It	Kenice Mobley	Yes	3.5 (D); 3.5 (L); 3.5 (G)	10.5
279	February 10, 2022	Ever After	Keah Brown	Yes	4 (D); 4 (L); 4 (G)	12
280	February 17, 2022	Zootopia	Matthew Mixon	Yes	.5 (D); 0 (L); 1 (G)	1.5
281	February 24, 2022	Zola	Jameelah Nasheed	Yes	4 (D); 4 (L); 4 (G)	12
282	March 3, 2022	Mulholland Drive	Dawn Borchardt	Yes	1 (D); 1.25 (L); 3 (G)	5.25
283	March 10, 2022	Smoke Signals	Olivia Woodward	Yes	4 (D); 4 (L); 4.5 (G)	12.5
284	March 17, 2022	Now You See Me	Kayla Drescher	No	0 (D); 0 (L); .5 (G)	.5
285	March 24, 2022	Blue Valentine	Youngmi Mayer	No	3.5 (D); 3.5 (L); 3 (G)	10
286	March 31, 2022	Caitlin and Jamie Take Thursday Off!	None	N/A	N/A	N/A
287	April 1, 2022	AMC Theaters. We Make Movies Better.	None	Yes	5 (D); 5 (L); N/A (G)	15 (W) 10 (C)
288	April 7, 2022	Empire Records	Shelli Nicole	Yes	2 (D); 1 (L); 2 (G)	5
289	April 14, 2022	Teenage Mutant Ninja Turtles II: The Secret of the Ooze	Carlos M. Camacho	No	.5 (D); .5 (L); 1 (G)	2
290	April 21, 2022	Magic Mike	None	No	2.5 (D); 3 (L); N/A (G)	8.25 (W) 5.5 (C)
291	April 28, 2022	The Da Vinci Code	None	No	0 (D); 0 (L); N/A (G)	0
292	May 5, 2022	Spirited Away	Ayumi Shinozaki	Yes	4.5 (D); 4.5 (L); 4 (G)	13
293	May 12, 2022	Unpregnant	None	Yes	3 (D); 3 (L); N/A (G)	9 (W) 6 (C)
294	May 19, 2022	Mad Max: Fury Road	None	Yes	3.75 (D); 4 (L); N/A (G)	11.63 (W) 7.75 (C)
295	May 26, 2022	Kiki's Delivery Service	Joelle Monique	Yes	4.75 (D); 4.75 (L); 4.75 (G)	14.25
296	June 2, 2022	Casper	None	Yes	1.5 (D); 2 (L); N/A (G)	5.25 (W) 3.5 (C)
297	June 9, 2022	My Neighbor Totoro	Miles Gray	Yes	5 (D); 5 (L); 5 (G)	15
298	June 16, 2022	Imagine Me & You	Samee Junio	Yes	3 (D); 3 (D); 2.5 (G)	8.5
299	June 23, 2022	The Babadook	None	Yes	3 (D); 3 (L); N/A (G)	9 (W) 6 (C)
300	June 30, 2022	Bound	Vanessa Guerrero	Yes	5 (D); 5 (L); 5 (G)	15
301	July 7, 2022	Idiocracy	None	No	.5 (D); 0 (L); N/A (G)	.75 (W) .5 (C)
302	July 14, 2022	If Beale Street Could Talk	Michael-Michelle Pratt	Yes	4.75 (D); 4.75 (L); 4.75 (G)	14.25
303	July 21, 2022	The Graduate	None	No	.5 (D); .5 (L); N/A (G)	1.5 (W) 1 (C)
304	July 28, 2022	Body Double	Shereen Lani Younes	No	0 (D); 0 (L); .5 (G)	.5
305	August 4, 2022	We Are the Best!	Margaret Killjoy	Yes	4.5 (D); 4.5 (L); 4.5 (G)	13.5
306	August 11, 2022	Turning Red	Rekha Shankar	Yes	5 (D); 5 (L); 4.5 (G)	14.5
307	August 18, 2022	The Shape of Water	None	Yes	2.5 (D); 2.5 (L); N/A (G)	7.5 (W) 5 (C)
308	August 25, 2022	Tangled	None	Yes	2.5 (D); 2.5 (L); N/A (G)	7.5 (W) 5 (C)
309	September 1, 2022	Wild Things	Princess Weekes	Yes	.5 (D); .5 (L); 1 (G)	2
310	September 8, 2022	Thirteen	Maggie Mae Fish	Yes	2.5 (D); 3 (L); 3 (G)	8.5
311	September 15, 2022	Dora and the Lost City of Gold	José María Luna	Yes	3 (D); 3 (L); 3.5 (G)	9.5
312	September 22, 2022	Real Women Have Curves	Mala Muñoz	Yes	4.5 (D); 4.5 (L); 5 (G)	14
313	September 29, 2022	Encanto	Jessica Flores	Yes	4.5 (D); 4.5 (L); 5 (G)	14
314	October 6, 2022	Prey	Johnnie Jae	Yes	4 (D); 4 (L); 4.5 (G)	12.5
315	October 13, 2022	The Ring	Joseph Fink	Yes	2.5 (D); 3 (L): 3 (G)	8.5
316	October 20, 2022	Misery	Ashley Blaine Featherson-Jenkins	No	2.5 (D); 3 (L); 3 (G)	8.5
317	October 27, 2022	The Witches	None	Yes	.5 (D); .5 (L); N/A (G)	1.5 (W) 1 (C)
318	November 3, 2022	Reality Bites	Bridget Todd	Yes	2 (D); 2.5 (L); 2.5 (G)	7
319	November 10, 2022	Sorry to Bother You	Sam Sanders	No	2.5 (D); 3 (L); 2.5 (G)	8
320	November 17, 2022	Don't Tell Mom the Babysitter's Dead	Amy Nicholson	Yes	3 (D); 3.75 (L); 4.25 (G)	11
321	November 24, 2022	The Bechdel Mandated Week Off	None	N/A	N/A	N/A
322	December 1, 2022	Batman Returns	Karen Han	Yes	3.5 (D); 3.5 (L); 4 (G)	11
323	December 8, 2022	El Camino Christmas	Cerise Castle	Yes	.25 (D); 0 (L); 0 (G)	.25
324	December 15, 2022	Avatar (2009)	Ali Nahdee	No	2.5 (D); 2.5 (L); 3(G)	8
325	December 22, 2022	The Santa Clauses (Season 1)	Grace Freud	Yes	10 (D); 10 (L); 10 (G)	30
326	December 29, 2022	A Feminist Promotion of Upcoming Bechdel Cast Events	None	N/A	N/A	N/A
327	January 5, 2023	An Extremely Q&A Episode	None	N/A	N/A	N/A
328	January 12, 2023	Shrek the Third	None	Yes	.5 (D); .5 (L); N/A (G)	1.5 (W) 1 (C)
329	January 19, 2023	Neverending Story	Jana Schmieding	No	2.5 (D); 2(L); 1.5 (G)	6
330	January 26, 2023	Armageddon	None	No	0 (D); 0 (L); N/A (G)	0
331	February 2, 2023	Something New	Kenice Mobley	Yes	2.5 (D); 2.75 (L); 3 (G)	8.25
332	February 9, 2023	Magic Mike XXL	Becca Ramos	Yes	3.5 (D); 3.5 (L); 3.5 (G)	10.5
333	February 16, 2023	Titanic: VHS Tape 1	None	N/A	N/A	N/A
334	February 23, 2023	Titanic: VHS Tape 2	None	N/A	N/A	N/A
335	March 2, 2023	Almost Famous	Kristen Lopez	Yes	1 (D); 1.5 (L); 2 (G)	4.5
336	March 9, 2023	A Goofy Movie	Dani Fernandez and La'Ron Readus	No	2.5 (D); 2.5 (L); 8 (G1); N/A (G2)	13
337	March 16, 2023	Emma (2020)	None	Yes	3 (D); 3 (L); N/A (G)	9 (W) 6 (C)
338	March 23, 2023	John Wick	Vanessa Guerrero	No	3 (D); 2 (L); 3 (G)	8
339	March 30, 2023	Buffaloed	Shelli Nicole	Yes	3.5 (D); 3.5 (L); 3 (G)	10
340	April 6, 2023	Super Mario Bros.	Abby Russell	Yes	2 (D); 4.5 (L); 4 (G)	10.5
341	April 13, 2023	George of the Jungle	None	Yes	1.5 (D); 2 (L); N/A (G)	5.25 (W) 3.5 (C)
342	April 20, 2023	The Woman King	Oyeronke Oyebanji	Yes	4.25 (D); 4 (L); 4.5 (G)	12.75
343	April 27, 2023	The Goonies	Sarah Marshall	No	.5 (D); 1 (L); 1 (G)	2.5
344	May 4, 2023	Crouching Tiger, Hidden Dragon	Mia Wong	Yes	4 (D); 4 (L); 3 (G)	11
345	May 11, 2023	RRR	Ritesh Babu	No	1.5 (D); 1 (L); N/A (G)	3.75 (W) 2.5 (C)
346	May 18, 2023	Sausage Party	None	Yes	-5 (D); -5 (L); N/A (G)	-15 (W) -10 (C)
347	May 25, 2023	Lilo and Stitch	Lily Hi'ilani Okimura	Yes	4 (D); 4 (L); 4 (G)	12
348	June 1, 2023	Spider-Man: Into the Spiderverse	None	No	4 (D); 4 (L); N/A (G)	12 (W) 8 (C)
349	June 8, 2023	Showgirls	Crystal	Yes	2 (D); 2 (L); 1 (G)	5
350	June 15, 2023	Miss Juneteenth	Angelica Jade Bastién	Yes	5 (D); 5 (L); 5 (G)	15
351	June 22, 2023	The Perks of Being a Wallflower	Maya Williams	No	2.5 (D); 2.5 (L); 2.5 (G)	7.5
352	June 29, 2023	Hairspray (2007)	Keah Brown	Yes	2.5 (D); 3 (L); 4 (G)	9.5
353	July 6, 2023	National Treasure: Book of Secrets	None	No	0 (D); 0 (L); N/A (G)	0 (W) 0 (C)
354	July 13, 2023	Hannah Montana: the Movie	Robert Evans and Sophie Lichterman	Yes	1.5 (D); 1.5 (L); N/A (G1); N/A (G2)	6 (W) 3 (C)
355	July 20, 2023	Smart House	None	Yes	1.5 (D); 2.5 (L); N/A (G)	6 (W) 4 (C)
356	July 27, 2023	The Haunted Mansion	Akilah Hughes	No	1.5 (D); 1.5 (L); 1.5 (G)	4.5
357	August 3, 2023	These Barbies Are on Vacation	None	N/A	N/A (D); N/A (L); N/A (G)	N/A
358	August 10, 2023	What's Love Got To Do With It? (2022)	Saadia Khan	Yes	2.5 (D); 2.5 (L); 2.5 (G)	7.5
359	August 17, 2023	Slap Shot	Mike Loftus	Yes	1 (D); 2 (L); 2 (G)	5
360	August 24, 2023	Jackie Brown	Sadia Azmat	Yes	3.5 (D); 3.75 (L); 4 (G)	11.25
361	August 31, 2023	Suspiria (2018)	Alissa Nutting and Alyson Levy	Yes	2.5 (D); 2.5 (L); 3.5 (G1); 3 (G2)	11.5
362	September 7, 2023	Confessions of a Teenage Drama Queen	Sequoia Holmes	Yes	2.5 (D); 2.5 (L); 2.5 (G)	7.5
363	September 14, 2023	Y Tu Mamá También	Adriana Ortega	Yes	2.5 (D); 3 (L); 3 (G)	8.5
364	September 21, 2023	Soul Food	Nydia Simone	Yes	3 (D); 3.5 (L); 4 (G)	10.5
365	September 28, 2023	Videodrome	Melissa Lozada-Oliva	Yes	1 (D); 2.5 (L); 3 (G)	6.5
366	October 5, 2023	Gotta Kick It Up!	Mekita Rivas	Yes	2.5 (D); 3 (L); 2 (G)	7.5
367	October 12, 2023	Psycho	Leila Latif	Yes	1 (D); 1.5 (L); 2.5 (G)	5
368	October 19, 2023	Scooby-Doo (2002)	None	Yes	2.5 (D); 2.5 (L); N/A (G)	7.5 (W) 5 (C)
369	October 26, 2023	The Blair Witch Project	Chelsey Weber-Smith	Yes	2.5 (D); 3 (L); 3 (G)	8.5
370	November 2, 2023	Ruby Sparks	Jesse David Fox	No	3.75 (D); 4 (L); 4 (G)	11.75
371	November 9, 2023	Say Anything	None	Yes	1.5 (D); 1.25 (L); N/A (G)	4.125 (W) 2.75 (C)
372	November 16, 2023	Steel Magnolias (1989)	Ashley Blaine Featherson-Jenkins	Yes	3 (D); 3 (L); 3 (G)	9
373	November 23, 2023	Reel Injun	S. A. Lawrence-Welch	N/A	N/A	N/A
374	November 30, 2023	The Preacher's Wife	Natasha Scott-Reichel and Justine Kay	Yes	2 (D); 3 (L); 2.5 (G1); 3 (G2)	7.75 (W) 10.5 (C)
375	December 7, 2023	TBC Recommends: We the Unhoused on iHeartRadio	None	N/A	N/A	N/A
376	December 14, 2023	It's a Wonderful Life	None	No	1 (D); 1 (L); N/A (G)	3 (W) 2 (C)
377	December 21, 2023	The Color Purple	Ashley Ray	Yes	3 (D); 3 (L); 4 (G)	10
378	December 28, 2023	We're Taking the Week Off (To Prep for Our Upcoming Tour Which You Simply Must Attend)	None	N/A	N/A	N/A
379	January 4, 2024	Shrek Forever After	None	No	.5 (D); 0 (L); N/A (G)	.75 (W) .5 (C)
380	January 11, 2024	Sunset Boulevard	None	Yes	3.5 (D); 3.75 (L); N/A (G)	10.875 (W) 7.25 (C)
381	January 18, 2024	May December	Kiran Deol	Yes	3 (D); 2.5 (L); 40(G)	45.5
382	January 25, 2024	Gone Girl	Princess Weekes	Yes	3 (D); 3 (L); 3.5 (G)	9.5
383	February 1, 2024	Beyond the Lights	Maya Williams	Yes	2.5 (D); 2.5 (L); 3 (G)	8
384	February 8, 2024	Save the Last Dance	Khadija Mbowe	Yes	.5 (D); 1 (L); 1.3 (G)	2.8
385	February 14, 2024	Valentine's Day	None	Yes	-5 (D); .5 (L); N/A(G)	-6.75 (W) -4.5 (C)
386	February 22, 2024	Can't Hardly Wait	Shelli Nicole	No	1 (D); 1 (L); 1 (G)	3
387	February 29, 2024	B.A.P.S.	Bridget Todd	Yes	4 (D); 3.5 (L); 4 (G)	11.5
388	March 7, 2024	The Apartment	Emily Heller	Yes	3 (D); 3 (L); 3 (G)	9
389	March 14, 2024	Julie & Julia	Summer Farah	Yes	2.75(D); 3.75 (L); 3.5 (G)	10
390	March 21, 2024	Barbie	None	Yes	4 (D); 4 (L); N/A (G)	12 (W) 8 (C)
391	March 28, 2024	The Sound of Music	Nelini Stamp	Yes	3 (D); 4 (L); 4 (G)	11
392	April 4, 2024	Poor Things	Amanda Montell	Yes	4 (D); 3.75 (L); 4 (G)	11.75
393	April 11, 2024	The Departed	Susan Zalkind	No	1 (D); 1 (L); 1 (G)	3
394	April 18, 2024	500 Movies of Bechdel Cast	None	N/A	N/A	N/A
395	April 25, 2024	Beauty Shop	Clarkisha Kent	Yes	4 (D); 4.25 (L); 4.5 (G)	12.75
396	May 2, 2024	Polite Society	Pireh Moosa	Yes	4.75 (D); 4.5 (L); 4.75 (G)	14
397	May 9, 2024	Ingrid Goes West	None	Yes	2.5 (D); 3 (L); N/A (G)	8.25 (W) 5.5 (C)
398	May 16, 2024	Mr. and Mrs. Smith	None	No	1 (D); .5 (L); N/A (G)	2.25 (W) 1.5 (C)
399	May 23, 2024	Past Lives	Nancy Wang Yuen	Yes	5 (D); 5 (L); 5 (G)	15
400	June 6, 2024	The Wolf of Wall Street	None	No	1 (D); 1 (L); N/A (G)	3 (W) 2 (C)
401	June 13, 2024	Interview with the Vampire	Jordan Gustafson and Brooke Solomon	No	2 (D); 2 (L); 2.5 (G1); 2 (G2)	8.5
402	June 19, 2024	The Blackening	Nonye-Brown West	Yes	4.5 (D); 4 (L); 4.75 (G)	13.25
403	June 27, 2024	The Birdcage	Manuel Betancourt	Yes	3.75 (D); 4 (L); 3.86 (G)	11.61
404	July 4, 2024	Minions	None	No	5 (D); 5 (L); (G) N/A	15 (W) 10 (C)
405	July 11, 2024	Hereditary	Puloma Ghosh	Yes	2 (D); 3.25 (L); 3 (G)	8.25
406	July 18, 2024	Twister	None	No	2 (D); 1.5 (L); N/A (G)	5.25 (W) 3.5 (C)
407	July 25,	Rerun: In Memory of Mike Loftus (Slap Shot)	Mike Loftus	Yes	1 (D); 2 (L); 2 (G)	5
408	August 1, 2024	Ex Machina	Olivia Gatwood	No	4 (D); 4 (L); 4 (G)	12
409	August 8, 2024	Chicken Run	None	Yes	3.5 (D); (4) L; N/A (G)	11.25 (W) 7.5 (C)
410	August 15, 2024	The Muppet Movie	None	No	2.5 (D); 2.5 (L); N/A (G)	7.5 (W) 5 (C)
411	August 22, 2024	His Girl Friday	None	Yes	1.5 (D); 2.5 (L); N/A (G)	6 (W) 4 (C)
412	August 29, 2024	My Best Friend's Wedding	None	Yes	.5 (D); .5 (L); N/A (G)	1.5 (W) 1 (C)
413	September 5, 2024	The Adventures of Priscilla, Queen of the Desert	Matt Baume	Yes	3.5 (D); 3.5 (L); 2 (G)	9
414	September 12, 2024	Taken	None	No	0 (D); 0 (L); N/A (G)	0 (W) 0 (C)
415	September 19, 2024	The Road to El Dorado	José María Luna	No	0 (D); 0 (L); 0 (G)	0
416	September 26, 2024	Jawbreaker	Crystal	Yes	2 (D); 2.5 (L); 3.5 (G)	8
417	October 3, 2024	Ginger Snaps	Olivia Woodward	Yes	3 (D); 3.75 (L); 4 (G)	10.75
418	October 10, 2024	From Dusk Till Dawn	Vanessa Guerrero	No	.5 (D); 1 (L); 1 (G)	2.5
419	October 17, 2024	Frida	Angela Campos	Yes	3.5 (D); 3.5 (L); 3.5 (G)	10.5
420	October 24, 2024	Get Out	Korama Danquah	Yes	4 (D); 4 (L); 3 (G)	11
421	October 31, 2024	Fresh	None	Yes	3 (D); 3 (L); N/A (G)	9 (W) 6 (C)
422	November 7, 2024	Triangle of Sadness	James Adomian	Yes	3.5 (D); 4 (L); 5 (G)	12.5
423	November 14, 2024	E.T. the Extra-Terrestrial	None	Yes	3 (D); 3.5 (L); N/A (G)	9.75 (W) 6.5 (C)
424	November 21, 2024	Gladiator	Emma Southon	No	.5 (D); .5 (L); .5 (G)	1.5
425	November 28, 2024	A Very Bechdel Tour Announcement - Shows + Livestreams!	None	N/A	N/A	N/A
426	December 5, 2024	Eyes Wide Shut	Honey Pluton	Yes	3.25 (D); N/A(L); N/A (G)	4.875 (W) 3.25 (C)
427	December 12, 2024	National Lampoon's Christmas Vacation	None	Yes	.5 (D); 1 (L); N/A (G)	2.025 (W) 1.5 (C)
428	December 19, 2024	A Bechdel Cast Year in Review + Tour Plug!	None	N/A	N/A	N/A
429	December 26, 2024	Eight Crazy Nights	Alex Danton-Klein	No	-5 (D); -5 (L); -5 (G)	-15
430	January 2, 2025	Goodfellas	None	No	2.5 (D); 2.5 (L); N/A (G)	7.5 (W) 5 (C)
431	January 9, 2025	Angus, Thongs and Perfect Snogging	Kate Cheka	No	1.5 (D); 1.5 (L); 1.5 (G)	4.5
432	January 16, 2025	Forrest Gump	Maia Wyman AKA Broey Deschanel	No	.5 (D); 1 (L); 1.5 (G)	3
433	January 23, 2025	Salt of this Sea	Yasmina Tawil	Yes	5 (D); 4.5 (L); 4.5 (G)	14
434	January 30, 2025	Aquamarine	Demma Strausbaugh and Imani Davis	Yes	3.5 (D); 3.5 (L); 3.5 (G1); 3 (G2)	13
435	February 6, 2025	The Secret Life of Bees	Maya Williams	Yes	3 (D); 3 (L); 3.5 (G)	9.5
436	February 13, 2025	Plan B (2021)	Danielle Bezalel	Yes	3.5 (D); 3.5 (L); 4 (G)	11
437	February 20, 2025	Zoolander	Kenice Mobley	Yes	2 (D); 1.5 (L); 2 (G)	5.5
438	February 27, 2025	Paris is Burning	DoctorJonPaul	Yes	3.75 (D); 3.75 (L); 3.75 (G)	11.25
439	March 6, 2025	The Substance	None	Yes	3.75 (D); 4 (L); N/A (G)	11.625 (W) 7.75 (C)
440	March 13, 2025	Rye Lane	Shelli Nicole	Yes	4.75 (D); 5 (L); 5 (G)	14.75
441	March 20, 2025	The Little Rascals	Tariq Ra'ouf	No	2 (D); 1 (L); 1 (G)	4
442	March 27, 2025	Pride and Prejudice (2005)	None	Yes	4 (D); 4 (L); N/A (G)	12 (W) 8 (C)
443	April 1, 2025	Snakes on a Plane	None	Yes	0 (D); 0 (L); N/A (G)	0 (W) 0 (C)
444	April 10, 2025	Babygirl	Emma Alamo	Yes	3 (D); N/A(L); 3.5 (G)	9.75 (W) 6.5 (C)
445	April 17, 2025	Muriel's Wedding	None	Yes	3.75 (D); 3.75 (L); N/A (G)	11.25 (W) 7.5 (C)
446	April 24, 2025	Are You There God? It's Me, Margaret	Kate Helen Downey	Yes	4 (D); 3.75 (L); 3.5 (G)	11.25
447	May 1, 2025	Twilight	Diannely Antigua	Yes	1.5 (D); 1 (L); 1.5 (G)	4
448	May 8, 2025	Always Be My Maybe	Keah Brown	Yes	3.75 (D); 3 (L); 3.85 (G)	10.6
449	May 15, 2025	Holes	Korama Danquah	Yes	5 (D); 5 (L); 3.5 (G)	10 holes, 3.5 nipples
450	May 22, 2025	Alison Bechdel is on the Bechdel Cast!!!	Alison Bechdel	N/A	N/A	N/A
451	May 29, 2025	Swing Girls	Ayumi Shinozaki	Yes	4 (D); 4 (L); 4.5 (G)	12.5
452	June 5, 2025	Bram Stoker's Dracula (1992)	Crystal	Yes	2 (D); 2 (L); 2 (G)	6
453	June 12, 2025	Addams Family Values	Ali Nahdee	Yes	3.5 (D); 3.5 (L); 4 (G)	11
454	June 19, 2025	Real Women Have Curves (with new intro!)	Mala Muñoz	Yes	4.5 (D); 4.5 (L); 5 (G)	14
455	June 26, 2025	Blue Crush	Melody Kamali	Yes	2 (D); 2 (L); 2 (G)	6
456	July 3, 2025	Jaws	None	No	1.5 (D); 2 (L); N/A (G)	5.25 (W) 3.5 (C)
457	July 10, 2025	Adventures in Babysitting (1987)	Maebe A. Girl	Yes	1 (D); 1.5 (L); 3.5 (G)	6
458	July 17, 2025	Perfect Blue	Giana Luna and Chika Supreme of Shoujo Sundae	Yes	2.5 (D); 2 (L); 2.5 (G1); 3 (G2)	10
459	July 26, 2025	Air Bud	Lindy West and Meagan Hatcher-Mays	No	1 (D); 2 (G1); 2 (G2); 1.5 (L)	6.5
460	July 31, 2025	Dazed and Confused	Maris Kreizman	No	0 (D); .5 (L); 1 (G)	1.5
461	August 8, 2025	Revisiting 'Her' in the Age of AI	Mona Chalabi	No	1 (D); 1 (L); 3 (G)	5
462	August 14, 2025	Jesus Christ Superstar (1973)	None	No	N/A (D); N/A (L); N/A (G)	N/A
463	August 21, 2025	Guardians of the Galaxy	None	Yes	2 (D); 1.5 (L); N/A (G)	5.25 (W) 3.5 (C)
464	August 28, 2025	First Cow	Mattie Lubchansky	No	2.5 (D); 2.5 (L); 4 (G)	9
465	September 4, 2025	Tour Check-in Minisode!	None	N/A	N/A	N/A
466	September 11, 2025	G.I. Jane	Rhiannon Hamam	Yes	0 (D); 0 (L); 0 (G)	0
467	September 18, 2025	Punch Drunk Love	Grace Freud	Yes	N/A (D); N/A (L); 5 (G)	5
468	September 25, 2025	All About My Mother	Tamara Yajia	Yes	4.5 (D); 4.5 (L); 5 (G)	14
469	October 2, 2025	Hitch	Ronald Young Jr.	No	2.5 (D); 2.5 (L); 3 (G)	8
470	October 9, 2025	Possession (1981)	Alicia Berbenick	No	1 (D); 1 (L); 1 (G)	3
471	October 16, 2025	Companion	Sammy Smart and Henley Cox	No	2.5 (D); 2.5 (L); 2.5 (G); 3 (G)	10.5
472	October 23, 2025	The Devil's Advocate (1997)	Sarah Marshall	Yes	.5 (D); 1 (L); 1 (G)	2.5
473	October 30, 2025	Sinners	Mx. Dalia Belle	Yes	4 (D); 4 (L); 4.5 (G)	12.5
474	November 6, 2025	Party Girl (1995)	Liz Gotauco	Yes	3 (D); 3 (L); 3 (G)	9
475	November 13, 2025	Mighty Morphin Power Rangers: the Movie	Carlos M. Camacho	Yes	1 (D); 1 (L); 2 (G)	4
476	November 20, 2025	Overboard (1987)	Mo Fry Pasic	No	0 (D); 0 (L); 1 (G)	1
477	November 27, 2025	Re-release: Rhymes for Young Ghouls	Jess Murwin	Yes	5 (D); 5 (L); 5 (G)	15
478	December 4, 2025	Star Wars: The Prequels! (Episodes I, II, & III)	None	No	.5 (D); .5 (D); N/A (G)	1.5 (W) 1 (C)
479	December 11, 2025	Female Trouble	Roz Hernandez	Yes	5 (D); 5 (L); 5 (G)	15
480	December 18, 2025	Bad Santa	Alonso Duralde	No	0 (D); 0 (L); 0 (G)	0
481	December 25, 2025	The Chronicles of Narnia: The Lion, the Witch, and the Wardrobe (2005)	None	Yes	2 (D); 2 (L); N/A (G)	6 (W) 4 (C)
482	January 8, 2026	New Year, New Q&A Episode	None	N/A	N/A	N/A
483	January 15, 2026	The Last Unicorn	Hannah Eko	Yes	3.5 (D); 4 (L); 4 (G)	11.5
484	January 22, 2026	The Prestige	Kayla Drescher	No	.5 (D); 0 (L); 0 (G)	.5
485	January 29, 2026	Don't Worry Darling	Payton McCarty-Simas	Yes	2 (D); 1.5 (L); 1.5 (G)	5
486	February 5, 2026	West Side Story (1961)	Becca Ramos	Yes	1 (D); 1.5 (L); 1.5 (G)	4
487	February 12, 2026	American Fiction	Ronald Young Jr.	Yes	4 (D); 3.75 (L); 4 (G)	11.75
488	February 19, 2026	Whatever Happened to Baby Jane?	Angelica Jade Bastién	Yes	4 (D); 5 (L); 5(G)	14
489	February 26, 2026	Daughters of the Dust	Kenice Mobley	Yes	5 (D); 5 (L); 4 (G)	14
490	March 5, 2026	The Women (1939)	Ramzi Fawaz	Yes	N/A(D); N/A (L); N/A (G)	N/A
491	March 12, 2026	The Luck of the Irish (2001)	None	No	1 (D); 1 (L); N/A (G)	3 (W) 2 (C)
492	March 19, 2026	Challengers	Princess Weekes	Yes	4 (D); 4 (L); 4 (G)	12
493	March 26, 2026	Ready or Not	None	Yes	3.25 (D); 3 (L); N/A (G)	9.375 (W) 6.25 (C)
494	April 1, 2026	Moonfall	None	Yes	5 (D); 5 (L); N/A (G)	15 (W) 10 (C)
495	April 9, 2026	Jupiter Ascending	Summer Farah	Yes	1.5 (D); 1.5 (L); 1 (G)	4
496	April 16, 2026	Honey, I Shrunk the Kids	Jana Schmieding	No	.5 (D); .5 (L); .5 (G)	1.5
497	April, 23, 2026	Tootsie	Nori Reed	No	.5 (D); .5 (L); .5 (G)	1.5
498	April 30, 2026	Mommie Dearest	Izzy Custodio	Yes	N/A (D); N/A (L); N/A (G)	N/A
499	May 7, 2026	Pretty Woman	Andrea Werhun and Nicole Bazuin	Yes	3 (D); 2.5 (L); 4.5 (G1); 3.5 (G2)	13.5
500	May 14, 2026	Star Wars: the Empire Strikes Back	None	No	2 (D); 2 (L); N/A (G)	6 (W) 4 (C)
501	May 21, 2026	Mississippi Masala	Durba Mitra	Yes	5 (D); 4.5 (L); 4.5 (G)	14
502	May 28, 2026	Scary Movie	None	No	-1,000,000 (D); -1,000,000 (L); N/A (G)	-3,000,000 (W) -2,000,000 (C)
503	June 4, 2026	Postcards from the Edge	Crystal	Yes	3.5 (D); 4 (L); 4.5 (G)	12
504	June 11, 2026	Appropriate Behavior	Melody Kamali	Yes	4 (D); 4 (L); 4 (G)	12
505	June 18, 2026	Theater Camp	None	Yes	3.75 (D); 3.5 (L); N/A (G)	10.875 (W) 7.25 (C)
506	June 25, 2026	Desert Hearts	Emily Mills	Yes	4.5 (D); 4.5 (L); 4.5 (G)	13.5
507	July 2, 2026	Captain America: The First Avenger	None	No	.5 (D); .5 (L); N/A (G)	1.5 (W) 1 (C)
508	July 9, 2026	Slums of Beverly Hills	Maia Wyman AKA Broey Deschanel	Yes	2.5 (D); 3 (L); 3.5 (G)	9
509	July 16, 2026	Four Weddings and a Funeral	Kate Cheka	No	1 (D); 1.25 (L); 2 (G)	4.25
510	July 23, 2026	Brokeback Mountain	Matthew Tinkcom	No	3.5 (D); 3.75 (L); 3 (G)	10.25
511	July 30, 2026	The Truman Show	Brandie Posey	No	3 (D); 2 (L); 3 (G)	8
512	August 6, 2026	The Fall (2006)	Ali El-Sadany	Yes	2 (D); 1.5 (L); 2 (G)	5.5
513	August 13, 2026	Pin (1988)	None	Yes	2.5 (D); 2.5 (L); N/A (G)	7.5 (W) 5 (C)
514	August 20, 2026	Send Help	Blair Braverman	No	2.5 (D); 2.5 (L); 2.5 (G)	7.5
515	August 27, 2026	Weird Science	Bridget Todd	Yes	0 (D); .5 (L); 1 (G)	1.5
516	September 3, 2026	An Extremely Anniversary Tour Details and Jamie's New Book Minisode!	None	N/A	N/A	N/A
517	September 10, 2026	Hedwig and the Angry Inch	Mia Schachter	Yes	2.5 (D); 2.5 (L); 3 (G)	8
518	September 17, 2026	One Battle After Another	Jess, the PrideBrarian	Yes	1 (D); 1.5 (L); .5 (G)	3
519	September 24, 2026	Babe: Pig in the City	James Stout	Yes	3 (D); 3 (L); 3 (G)	9
520	October 1, 2026	White Chicks	Taylor Garron	No	.5 (D); .5 (L); .5 (G)	1.5
521	October 8, 2026	I, Frankenstein	None	No	1 (D); 10 & 1 (L); N/A (G)	N/A
522	October 15, 2026	La Llorona (2019)	Vanessa Guerrero	Yes	4.5 (D); 4 (L); 4.5 (G)	13
523	October 22, 2026	The Accused	Sarah Marshall	Yes	3.5 (D); 4 (L); 4 (G)	11.5
524	October 29, 2026	Bodies, Bodies, Bodies	Korama Danquah	Yes	2.5 (D); 2.5 (L); 2 (G)	7
525	November 5, 2026	V for Vendetta	Leila Latif	No	4 (D); 3 (L); 4 (G)	11
526	November 12, 2026	Underworld	Carisa Hendrix	No	1.5 (D); 1.25 (L); 1 (G)	3.75

Patreon Episodes
Episode #	Date aired	Title
1	October 12, 2017	Get Out with Rae Sanni
2	October 27, 2017	Things We Learned in the First Year of the Bechdel Cast
3	November 13, 2017	Superbad
4	November 25, 2017	The Muppet Christmas Carol
5	December 18, 2017	How the Grinch Stole Christmas (2000)
6	December 30, 2017	Legally Blonde
7	January 15, 2018	Ghostbusters (1984)
8	January 29, 2018	Ghostbusters (2016)
9	February 13, 2018	I, Tonya
10	February 26, 2018	The Disaster Artist
11	March 13, 2018	Q&A with Jamie and Caitlin
12	March 31, 2018	Chocolat (2000)
13	April 9, 2018	Juno
14	April 14, 2018	Titanic
15	May 13, 2018	The Parent Trap (1998)
16	May 28, 2018	The Big Lebowski
17	June 17, 2018	Back to the Future with Kenice Mobley
18	June 30, 2018	Scott Pilgrim vs. the World
19	July 16, 2018	Incredibles 2
20	July 30, 2018	The Legend of Billie Jean
21	August 18, 2018	Doubt
22	August 31, 2018	Hackers
23	September 14, 2018	Q&A with Jamie and Caitlin
24	September 28, 2018	Teeth
25	October 12, 2018	The Babadook
26	October 31, 2018	Halloweentown
27	November 8, 2018	The Girl with the Dragon Tattoo (2011)
28	November 26, 2018	Hard Candy
29	December 10, 2018	A Christmas Prince
30	December 24, 2018	The Princess Switch
31	January 14, 2019	Dumplin'
32	January 28, 2019	Drop Dead Gorgeous
33	February 11, 2019	Titanic: Sunk and Drunk
34	February 24, 2019	Titanic Audio Commentary: Part 1 & 2
35	March 11, 2019	High School Musical
36	March 30, 2019	17 Again
37	April 15, 2019	Garden State
38	April 29, 2019	Annihilation
39	May 17, 2019	Spider-Man: Into the Spider-Verse
40	May 31, 2019	Who Framed Roger Rabbit
41	June 14, 2019	Knocked Up
42	June 26, 2019	Obvious Child
43	July 9, 2019	American Pie
44	July 29, 2019	American Psycho
45	August 18, 2019	Freaky Friday
46	August 30, 2019	Jennifer's Body
47	September 16, 2019	Maid in Manhattan with Vanessa Gritton
48	September 30, 2019	The Wedding Planner Part 1 & 2
49	October 14, 2019	Death Becomes Her
50	October 28, 2019	Coraline
51	November 11, 2019	9 to 5 with Sophie Lichterman
52	November 27, 2019	Working Girl with Maja Orsic
53	December 10, 2019	Jack Frost
54	December 22, 2019	A Christmas Prince: The Royal Baby
55	January 13, 2020	Someone Great
56	January 27, 2020	The Kissing Booth with Jacob Elordi
57	February 7, 2020	Oscar Coverage 2019
58	February 24, 2020	The Favourite with Iszi Lawrence
59	March 15, 2020	The Witches of Eastwick Part 1 & 2
60	March 30, 2020	Moonstruck
61	April 13, 2020	Bridesmaids
62	April 27, 2020	The Hangover
63	May 17, 2020	Shaun of the Dead
64	May 28, 2020	Monty Python and the Holy Grail
65	June 15, 2020	Blockers
66	June 29, 2020	Eighth Grade
67	July 13, 2020	Zenon: Girl of the 21st Century
68	July 27, 2020	Cadet Kelly with Keah Brown
69	August 18, 2020	Lolita (1962)
70	August 31, 2020	I, Frankenstein
71	September 14, 2020	Stick It
72	September 28, 2020	Whip It
73	October 12, 2020	The Cabin in the Woods
74	October 26, 2020	What We Do in the Shadows
75	November 16, 2020	Billboard Dad
76	November 30, 2020	Passport to Paris
77	December 14, 2020	The Princess Switch: Switched Again
78	December 21, 2020	A Christmas Prince: The Royal Wedding
79	January 12, 2021	Enchanted
80	January 26, 2021	Arrival
81	February 15, 2021	Chicken Run
82	February 26, 2021	Coyote Ugly
83	March 15, 2021	Ralph Breaks the Internet
84	March 29, 2021	The Da Vinci Code
85	April 14, 2021	Another Titanic Episode: 2021 Edition
86	April 26, 2021	Borat: Subsequent Moviefilm
87	May 17, 2021	Sin CIty
88	May 31, 2021	Knives Out
89	June 14, 2021	Stuart Little
90	June 29, 2021	Babe
91	July 12, 2021	Léon: The Professional
92	July 26, 2021	No Strings Attached
93	August 16, 2021	Crossroads
94	August 29, 2021	The Lizzie McGuire Movie
95	September 13, 2021	An Education
96	September 27, 2021	Revenge of the Nerds
97	October 11, 2021	Happy Death Day
98	October 25, 2021	Death at a Funeral (2007)
99	November 15, 2021	You've Got Mail
100	November 29, 2021	How To Lose a Guy in 10 Days
101	December 13, 2021	The Princess Switch 3: Romancing the Star
102	December 29, 2021	The Snowman
103	January 17, 2022	Ella Enchanted
104	January 31, 2022	A Cinderella Story
105	February 14, 2022	Pride and Prejudice (2005)
106	February 28, 2022	Emma (2020)
107	March 14, 2022	Romancing the Stone
108	March 29, 2022	Dora and the Lost City of Gold with José María Luna
109	April 15, 2022	Another Titanic Episode (2022 Edition)
110	April 29, 2022	William Shakespeare's Romeo + Juliet
111	May 17, 2022	Face/Off
112	May 30, 2022	Top Gun
113	June 13, 2022	I Know What You Did Last Summer
114	June 27, 2022	Midsommar
115	July 16, 2022	Despicable Me
116	July 29, 2022	The 40-Year-Old Virgin
117	August 15, 2022	Jamie's Birthday Hall of Horros
118	August 29, 2022	Saw
119	September 12, 2022	Never Been Kissed
120	September 26, 2022	Pitch Perfect
121	October 17, 2022	Final Destination 3
122	October 31, 2022	Malignant
123	November 14, 2022	The Godfather
124	November 28, 2022	Goodfellas
125	December 12, 2022	Falling for Christmas
126	December 26, 2022	While You Were Sleeping
127	January 16, 2023	Disney's Pinocchio (2022)
128	January 30, 2023	Guillermo del Toro's Pinocchio
129	February 13, 2023	Sweet Home Alabama
130	February 27, 2023	50 First Dates
131	March 13, 2023	Big
132	March 27, 2023	The Virgin Suicides
133	April 17, 2023	Life-Size
134	April 28, 2023	M3GAN
135	May 17, 2023	Back to the Future
136	May 29, 2023	Office Space
137	June 16, 2023	What is the WGA Strike? a Very Bechdel Cast Explainer
138	June 30, 2023	Newsies with Sharon Jung and interview with Sarah Marshall
139	July 17, 2023	What a Girl Wants
140	July 31, 2023	John Tucker Must Die
141	August 14, 2023	Pee-wee's Big Adventure
142	August 28, 2023	Little Shop of Horrors (1986)
143	September 11, 2023	Daddy Day Care
144	September 29, 2023	Mr. Mom
145	October 16, 2023	It Follows
146	October 30, 2023	Barbarian
147	November 14, 2023	Do Revenge
148	November 27, 2023	Kill Bill Vol. 1 and 2
149	December 11, 2023	Star Trek (2009)
150	December 26, 2023	Guardians of the Galaxy
151	January 15, 2024	Flashdance
152	January 29, 2024	Burlesque
153	February 12, 2024	27 Dresses
154	February 26, 2024	Ready or Not
155	March 18, 2024	Singin' in the Rain
156	March 30, 2024	Some Like It Hot
157	April 15, 2024	Herbie: Fully Loaded
158	April 29, 2024	Desperately Seeking Susan
159	May 13, 2024	Monsters, Inc.
160	May 27, 2024	Mars Attacks!
161	June 14, 2024	Tank Girl
162	June 28, 2024	Madame Web
163	July 15, 2024	Mamma Mia! Here We Go Again
164	July 29, 2024	High School Musical 2
165	August 18, 2024	Titane
166	August 30, 2024	Titanic 666
167	September 16, 2024	Ferris Bueller's Day Off
168	September 30, 2024	Sixteen Candles
169	October 14, 2024	The Exorcist
170	October 28, 2024	Pearl
171	November 11, 2024	Bling Ring
172	November 25, 2024	Ocean's 8
173	December 16, 2024	Hot Frosty
174	December 23, 2024	Our Little Secret
175	January 13, 2025	The Fly (1986)
176	January 27, 2025	Bee Movie
177	February 17, 2025	Before Trilogy - Part One
178	February 24, 2025	Before Trilogy - Part Two
179	March 18, 2025	Ratatouille
180	March 31, 2025	The Great Mouse Detective
181	April 14, 2025	Waitress (2007)
182	April 28, 2025	Lisa Frankenstein
183	May 12, 2025	The Shawshank Redemption
184	May 27, 2025	O Brother, Where Art Thou?
185	June 16, 2025	Camp Rock
186	June 30, 2025	Troop Beverly Hills
187	July 14, 2025	Young Frankenstein
188	July 28, 2025	Scary Movie
189	August 18, 2025	Serial Mom
190	August 29, 2025	Anatomy of a Fall
191	September 15, 2025	The Banshees of Inisherin
192	September 29, 2025	Amadeus
193	October 13, 2025	The Others
194	October 27, 2025	Sleepy Hollow (1999)
195	November 10, 2025	The Menu (2022)
196	November 24, 2025	Willy Wonka & the Chocolate Factory
197	December 8, 2025	The Family Stone
198	December 22, 2025	Black Christmas (1974)
199	January 12, 2026	Saltburn
200	January 26, 2026	Shark Tale
201	February 9, 2026	A Knight's Tale
202	February 23. 2026	Marie Antoinette (2006)
203	March 16, 2026	Leap Year
204	March 30, 2026	The Boondock Saints
205	April 13, 2026	Best in Show
206	April 27, 2026	Lemony Snicket's A Series of Unfortunate Events
207	May 11, 2026	The Secret Garden (1993)
208	May 25, 2026	The Land Before Time
209	June 15, 2026	Mrs. Doubtfire
210	June 29, 2026	Kramer vs. Kramer
211	July 13, 2026	Hercules
212	July 27, 2026	The Lighthouse
213	August 18, 2026	Minions: the Rise of Gru
214	August 31, 2026	2001: A Space Odyssey
215	September 14, 2026	The Best Little Whorehouse in Texas
216	September 28, 2026	Muppet Treasure Island
217	October 11, 2026	Saw II
218	October 27, 2026	Backrooms
219	November 16, 2026	The Cat in the Hat (2003)

== Notes ==
1.Only Loftus gave a rating in this episode.
2.Loftus would later admit that she has never seen The Matrix. On the Dec. 22, 2021 Loftus reminded the audience she had not watched on their initial recording but did watch for the Dec 22nd new episode.
3.The cumulative total is higher due to the participation of two guests. A film's weighted score, created by averaging the total guest scores, is indicated with (W); the cumulative with (C).
4.The guest left the episode early and did not give a rating.
5.In the absence of three ratings a weighted score is created by averaging the two available scores to create a proxy guest score.
6.Durante gave the film -40 Nipples and -40 Ass-Cheeks.
7.Loftus gave the film -40 Nipples and -40 Butts.
8.The guest did not give a rating.
9.Loftus asked the Wikipedia editor updating the page to choose between 3.5 or 4. This editor has chosen 4.
10.The guest opted to not use the Nipple Rating and gave the film "1 me at [age] 18."
11.Given the specific content of this film, Caitlin and Jamie said that while it may have passed they were not choosing to address the test and whether it passed.
12.Caitlin initially rated it .5 nipples but to keep the total low given Grace's 4.5 nipples, she lowered hers to -4.
13.First of several re-dos of early episodes, since taken down from the feed.
14.Bridget said she could not give it a 4 but was in a 3.5-4 range so I selected 3.75 for score total.
15.Caitlin did not decide on a score so in calculating the total this editor used an average score in calculating the totals.
16.The guest, Cerise Castle, did not give a score but said it was horrible which this editor interpreted as a zero.
17.Per Jaime's request scores were 6 nipples as a little joke, note the date of release.
18.Over the last few episodes their definition and use of the Bechdel Test has expanded to not just be a two passing lines but lines central to the plot. This movie has lines that pass on the surface but are not relevant to the story.
19.They speak about To All the Boys I've Loved Before but discuss the whole trilogy in this episode.
20.At the time of recording Jaime did not feel like she was able to give a rating to the film as she is still processing given the subject matter.
21.Keah Brown was a brief guest and did not remain for the whole Matreon episode and so was not around to provide a rating when the episode was moved to the main feed.
22.This episode and episode 252 are an Aack Cast crossover. Episode 251, Caitlin and Jamie introduce the episode. Episode 252, is a reshare of the Aackcast Episode 3.
23.After initially giving the film a 3.25 Caitlin, given the content of the movie, changed her rating to pi, 3.14...giving the total rating a never-ending decimal point.
24.Caitlin oscillated between and 0 and .5 and seemed like she was leaning toward 0 and this editor chose 0 as the nipple scale rating.
25.This episode, covering Mad Max:Fury Road, is a re-do of an initial episode where Caitlin and Jamie discuss their growth from their initial recording.
26.Miles Gray gave the film 24 Nipto coins that converts to 5 nipples. They proceeded to joke about Nipto currency.
27.Caitlin could not decide between 2 and 3 and was leaning toward 2.5 which this editor chose as her official score.
28.Mala assigned 4 nipples to start but while assigning them, in wanting to give more, gave 5 so this editor chose 5 as her score.
29.Cerise's audio was lost and Caitlin said that her rating was between 0 and 1 and this editor chose 0 for the score.
30.The Santa Clauses is the only TV show covered by the Bechdel Cast. The vibe of this episode is very comedic resulting in a 10 nipple rating from everyone, a largely unprecedented ranking.
31.Jamie was thinking of giving a 2.5 but also wanted to give an extra .5 so said the editor should choose and this editor chose 2.75, between 2.5 and 3.
32.This is part one of a two part Titanic episode, labeled tape one as a nod to the movie released on 2 VHS tapes. There is no guest. In this episode they do not recap the episode (so no Bechdel Test pass or ratings) but they discuss their history with Titanic and briefly recap their previous episodes.
33.This is part two of a two part Titanic episode. Again, there is no guest. In this episode they recap the movie and provide new factoids, context and information from various commentary tracks. They do not address the Bechdel Test, or provide a rating of the film.
34.This episode featured a live segment with Dani Fernandez who gave the film 8 nipples. Caitlin and Jamie gave their rating after having guest La'Ron Readus discuss the film more in depth. Neither he nor the hosts gave ratings, but Caitlin and Jamie gave their rating after in the final segment.
35.The guest, Ritesh Babu, was featured to discuss the historical context of RRR and their article in Vox. Given how they were featured in the episode they did not give a rating for the film.
36.This episode was from a recorded live show. During the live they give fun, joke ratings and give a more serious rating on this episode. The guests were not back for the update so they do not have a rating this episode.
37.This episode is the first time the Cast covers a documentary. As such passing the Bechdel Test was inapplicable (though Caitlin, Jamie and guest agreed Indigenous women could have been better represented) and as a documentary did not feel it was appropriate to give a nipple rating, thus gave none.
38.On this episode, Caitlin and Jamie introduce a returning show, new to iHeartRadio called We the Unhoused. After introducing the show, the share a segment from the beginning of the relaunch episode. Because of this format, there is no guest, or rating for this episode.
39.In this episode, guest Kiran Deol, rates the film on a scale of hotdogs with no clear upper end. The total ranking incorporates that resulting in 45.5.
40.In this episode Caitlin cannot decide between 2.5 and 3 so this editor chose 2.75 to meet in the middle.
41.This episode Caitlin and Jamie discuss the journey so far, including covering 500 movies since the show's inception on the main feed and the Patreon aka Matreon. No guests or rankings but talk about what they've learned doing to the show.
42.The guest could not decide between 3.75 and 4 so this editor took an average for their guest score.
43.This episode is a re-release of the Slap Shot episode with a brief intro contextualizing the release. It was released in honor of the passing of Jamie Loftus' father and episode guest Mike Loftus.
44.Jamie and the guest could not decide on a rating so this editor put it as N/A. To calculate the weighted score this editor used a zero for Jamie making the weighted score 4.87.
45.While Caitlin and Jamie agreed the film technically passed, the context and subtext were often about a boy/man and so they agreed it did not spiritually pass and so this editor listed it as no.
46.Jamie could not decide on a score and needed more time to process the film and so score was left as N/A.
47.Caitlin and Jamie could not pick on the nipple scale so gave hole ratings. The guest did give a nipple scale rating.
48.On this episode Caitlin and Jamie have a conversation with Alision Bechdel and they did not rate a movie, so there was nothing to pass, and nothing to rate.
49.This episode is a re-release of a main feed episode with a new intro about the ICE raids and protests in LA at the time of the release. The original episode (312) featured a note about the score of the guest repeated here for clarity without duplicating the note: Mala assigned 4 nipples to start but while assigning them, in wanting to give more, gave 5 so this editor chose 5 as her score.
50.The hosts did not give the film a Nipple Rating on this episode citing the involvement of the Israeli government in the production and not needing to give a film nipples made in the ways it was (see episode for more).
51.Caitlin and Jamie did not think the nipple scale appliedbut both gave the film 5 novelty toilet brushes.

.52.Grace was the only one who gave nipples and so the score is 5, or 5 nipples and 10 novelty toilet brushes. .53.Caitlin and Jamie did not think the nipple scale would work for a film like Female Trouble, as such the fives they and the guest give are not nipples. Jamie gives it five plates of spaghetti, Caitlin gives it five human size cages and Roz, the guest, gives it five trampolines. .54.In this episode, Caitlin and Jamie did not think the Nipple Scale would work so they instead rated on Life Size Baby Jane dolls.

55.Caitlin and Jamie did not think the Nipple Scale would work and so they and the guest did not give the film a rating.
56.Caitlin, Jamie and Izzy agreed that they could not apply the Nipple Scale to this film given its particulars.
57.As a Matreon released on the main feed, Caitlin and Jamie did not use the nipple scale rating. Jamie gave it 10 stone nipples and 1 demon nipple. Caitlin rated the movie 1 iFrankenstein nipple.
58.This episode revisits Titanic again with a discussion of the animated The Legend of the Titanic, Titanic II, documentary the Six and more.
59.This Matreon episode is titled "The (Little) Snow(wo)man" as the Little Women movie received the most votes and they spend the first 10 minutes discussing Little Women and said they didn't have anything new to say and thus chose to discuss the Snowman, and spend the rest of the episode it.
60.{Intended to be a main-feed episode about the 2017 movie The Shape of Water, Caitlin and Jamie get distracted talking about the band 311's cruise, how Jamie would like to die (as the only fatality on the 311 cruise), the Avatar movie franchise, the staff of Medieval Times unionizing, and various other cultural ephemera and never get around to talking about the movie.
61.Caitlin and Jamie discuss Pinocchio broadly as part of their Pinocchio Wars Matreon theme (including the source material), Pinocchio: A True Story (with Pauly Shore) and the Disney live-action remake.
62.Caitlin and Jamie continue the Pinocchio Wars with a discussion of Guillermo Del Toro's Pinocchio and briefly The Erotic Adventures of Pinocchio.
63.In this Matreon episode, the theme is Junion (rhymes with union), where Caitlin and Jamie discuss the WGA strike and contextualizes it in broader Hollywood union conversations.
