= Mahogany L. Browne =

American poet, curator, writer, organizer and educator

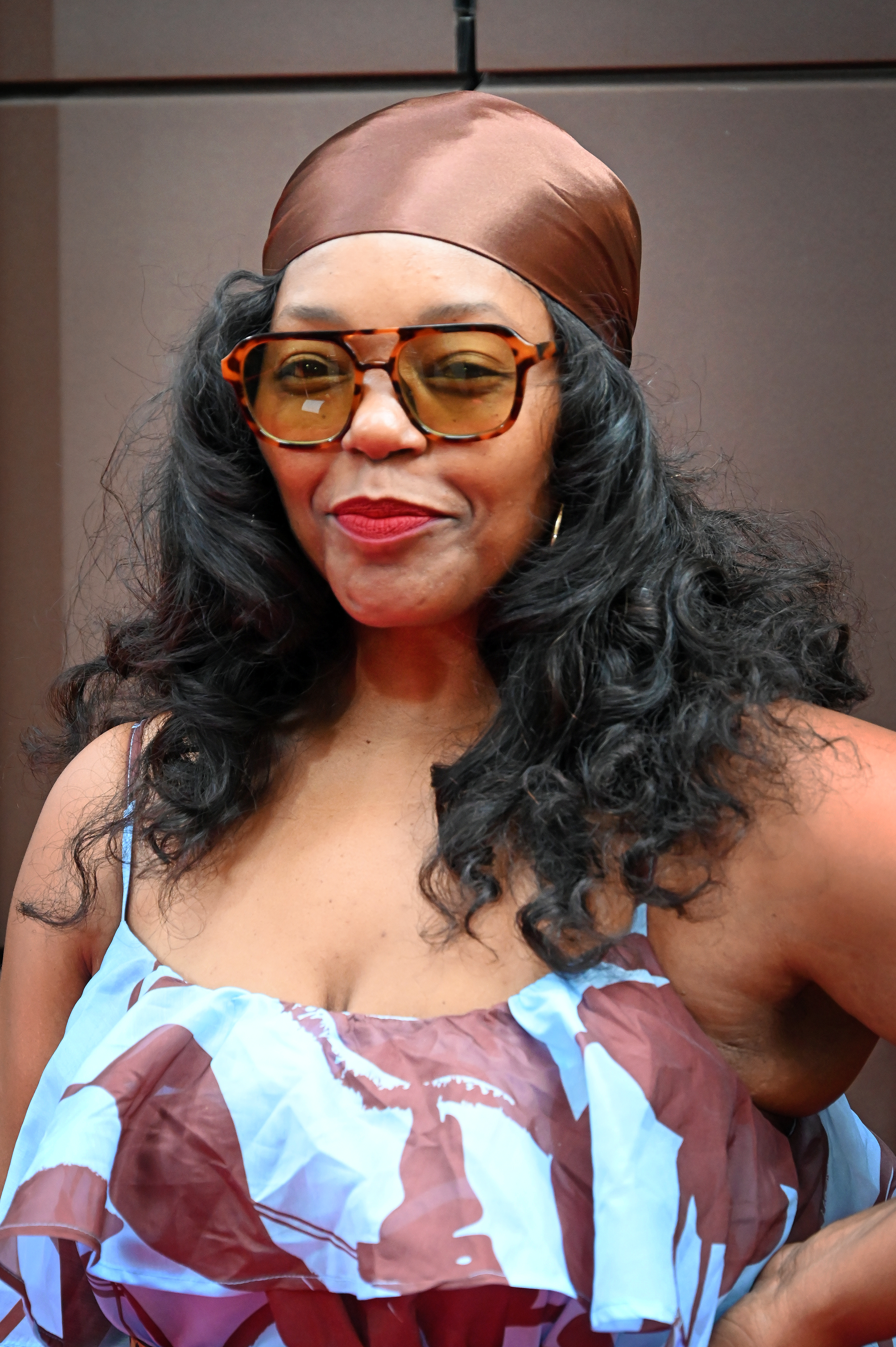
- Browne in 2026
- Born: Lesley Tims; 1976 (age 49–50); Oakland, California
- Education: Pratt Institute
- Occupations: Poet and author
- Writing career
- Movements: Activism, children's books

Mahogany L. Browne (born as Lesley Tims) is an American poet, curator, writer, organizer and educator. As of July 2021, Browne is the first-ever poet-in-residence at New York City's Lincoln Center.

== Biography ==
Mahogany L. Browne was born and raised in Oakland, California before moving to Brooklyn, New York in 1999. She recalls never having imagined moving to New York permanently as someone born and raised in Oakland, California but after her summer residency at Pratt Institute ended, she decided to stay. She earned a master of fine arts degree in writing and activism from the Pratt Institute.

She is known for her thirteen-year tenure as the Friday Night Slam curator and Poetry Program director at the Nuyorican Poets Café in Lower Manhattan. In 2019, Browne served as the Black Lives Matter (BLM) program coordinator at her alma mater, Pratt Institute, where she was also a visiting instructor.

Browne is currently the executive director at Bowery Poetry Club, founded by Bob Holman in 2003. Browne is also the artistic director at Urban Word NYC, Poetry Coordinator at St. Francis College and the author of several books (including children's books), stage plays, articles and audio recordings. The founder of Penmanship Books, Browne has received numerous awards and fellowships, among which is a fellowship from the Art for Justice Fund (A4J). The Academy of American Poets has published several blog essays of Browne's through their partnership with A4J.

== Awards ==
In 2019, Browne received a SWACC! Focus Fellowship, which is awarded to a spoken word author whose lifelong creative work has demonstrated a commitment to building community through collaborative models.

She was nominated for the NAACP Image Award for Outstanding Literary Work – Poetry.

In 2024, she received an honorary doctorate in humane letters from Marymount Manhattan College.

== Publications ==
=== Young Adult ===
- Chlorine Sky, Crown/Penguin Random, 2020
- Vinyl Moon, Crown/Penguin Random, 2021
- A Bird in the Air Means We Can Still Breathe, Crown/Penguin, 2025

=== Poetry collections ===
- Kissing Caskets, Yes Yes Books, 2017
- Unlikely & Other Sorts, Penmanship Books, 2006
- Destroy, Rebuild & Other Reconstructions of the Human Muscle, Penmanship Books, 2009
- #Dear Twitter: Love Letters Hashed Out Online in 140 Characters or Less, Penmanship Books, 2010
- Swag, Penmanship Books, 2010
- smudge, Button Poetry, 2015
- REDBone, Willow Books, 2015
- Black Girl Magic: A Poem, Roaring Brook Press, 2018
- Woke Baby, Roaring Brook Press, 2018
- Chrome Valley, Liveright Publishing, 2023

=== Essays ===
- "Dismantling Rage: On Audre Lorde’s Sister Outsider"

=== Poems ===
- "Ego-Tripp(ed)," The Academy of American Poets, 2015
- "Litany," The Academy of American Poets, 2019
- "Inevitable," The Academy of American Poets, 2019
- "On St. John’s and Franklin Avenue," The Academy of American Poets, 2019
- "The 19th Amendment & My Mama", March 21 2020

=== Anthologies ===
- Editor, His Rib: Stories, Poems & Essays by Her, Penmanship Books, 2007
- Editor and contributor, The BreakBeat Poets Volume 2: Black Girl Magic, Haymarket Books, 2018
- Contributor, Well-Read Black Girl: Finding Our Stories, Discovering Ourselves by Glory Edim, Penguin Random House, 2018
- Lead author (with Elizabeth Acevedo and Olivia Gatwood), Woke: A Young Poet's Call to Justice, Roaring Brook Press, 2020
- Contributor, Four Hundred Souls: A Community History of African America by Ibram X. Kendi and Keisha N. Blain, Penguin Random House, 2020
- Contributor, African American Poetry: 250 Years of Struggle & Song by Kevin Young, Penguin Random House, 2020
