= Jamie Loftus =

American comedian and writer

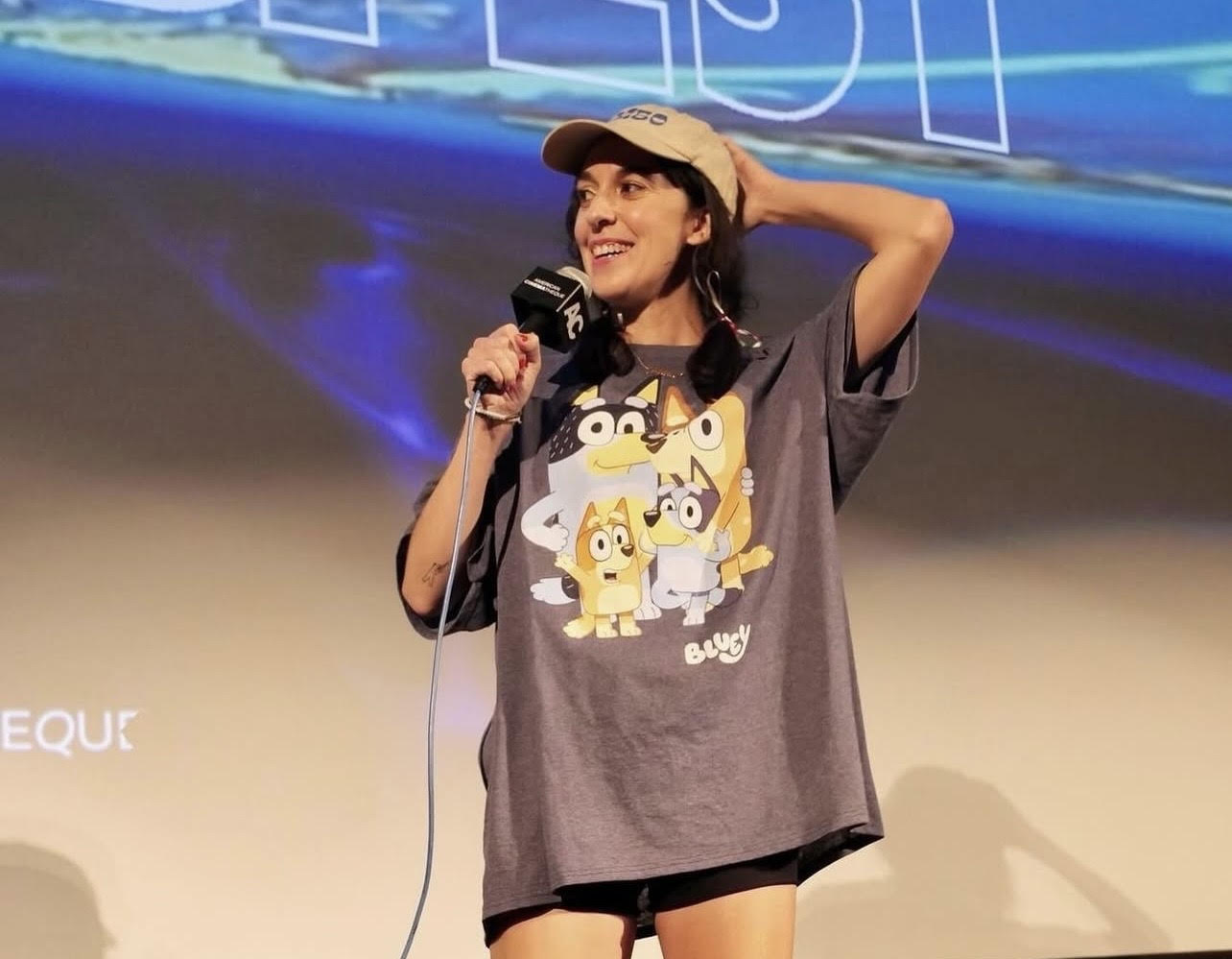
- Loftus in 2024
- Born: Boston, Massachusetts, U.S.
- Education: Emerson College

Comedy career
- Medium: Stand up, animation, television
- Genre: Alternative comedy

Jamie Bethany Loftus is an American writer, stand up alternative comedian, podcaster and actress based in Los Angeles.

She is known for her solo work, such as her one-woman shows I Lost My Virginity on August 15, 2010 and Boss, Whom is Girl. She has also written comedic articles, and written and starred in video content, for media sites such as Adult Swim, Comedy Central, Paste, and Super Deluxe. She was nominated for an Emmy for her work on Robot Chicken in 2020.

Along with fellow comedian Caitlin Durante, she has co-hosted The Bechdel Cast, a weekly podcast about the representation of women in film since 2016. She has also produced and hosted limited run podcasts for iHeartRadio: My Year in Mensa, Lolita Podcast, Aack Cast, and Ghost Church.

== Early life and education ==
Jamie Joaquin Loftus grew up in Brockton, Massachusetts. Her father was a hockey reporter and her mother ran a daycare center.

She attended Emerson College, and worked at a hot dog truck during her college years.

== Career ==
Loftus's first job out of college was at The Boston Globe. She was fired from the role when she tweeted after a standup set, "crushing so hard at an open mic that I cum bloods." A local radio show referenced this as "the end of journalism."

Her often absurdist humor, sometimes bordering on performance art and documented for websites such as Paste, has included pretending to date an American Girl doll, joining Mensa as a joke, selling "Shrek nudes" with her body painted green to raise money for Planned Parenthood, and attempting to eat a copy of David Foster Wallace's Infinite Jest.

She has written and performed several one-woman live shows. One is called I Lost My Virginity on August 15, 2010. Another show, Boss, Whom is Girl, was workshopped at the Lyric Hyperion Theatre in Los Angeles. It was then brought to the United Kingdom with shows in London and at the 2019 Edinburgh Fringe. Its run at the Fringe was recommended by newspapers such as The Guardian, The Sunday Times, and The Daily Express.

In April 2018, a three-part web series she wrote and starred in, Irrational Fears was released on Comedy Central Digital.

In summer 2018, she was hired as a writer for the Adult Swim show Robot Chicken. In 2020 an episode of the show she had written for was nominated for an Emmy.

=== Podcasting ===
Since November 2016 she has co-hosted The Bechdel Cast with Caitlin Durante, a weekly podcast about the representation of women in film.

On January 1, 2020, Loftus released a four-part podcast entitled My Year in Mensa that chronicles the events surrounding her applying to join Mensa for the purpose of writing a series of humorous articles for Paste.

On November 23, 2020, Loftus began releasing a 10-part podcast entitled Lolita Podcast about the pop cultural imprint, misinterpretations, and adaptations of Vladimir Nabokov's novel Lolita.

On June 28, 2021, she began releasing another podcast series, this time about the comic Cathy, titled Aack Cast.

In 2022, Loftus released a nine episode podcast series Ghost Church, where she explores the history and current state of the Spiritualist religion in the United States.

In May 2024 she began a new weekly podcast for Cool Zone Media titled Sixteenth Minute (of Fame), in which she talks to and about "internet main characters" who have achieved some level of brief notoriety online.

=== Raw Dog ===
In May 2023 Loftus released the book Raw Dog: The Naked Truth About Hot Dogs, published by Macmillan. In the book, Loftus tells of her varied experiences of hot dogs in the United States while explaining hot dogs' rise to popularity in the United States during the Great Depression thanks to Greek, Polish and German immigrants.

Raw Dog was a New York Times and Indie bestseller, and was shortlisted for the Thurber Prize for American Humor in 2024. The audiobook, read by Loftus, was nominated for an Audie Award.

== Other activities ==
In 2021 and 2022 Loftus canvassed for the Democratic Socialists of America, has performed at DSA-LA fundraisers, and was a chaperone at the DSA-LA 2026 Prom. She was dropped from her representation in 2023 after sharing pro-Palestine posts on social media, and has performed or hosted numerous fundraisers advocating for a free Palestine.

== Awards and nominations ==
- iHeartRadio Podcast Awards – Nominated for "The Bechdel Cast" (2020)
- Emmy Awards – Nominated for "Outstanding Short Form Animated Program" (Robot Chicken) (2020)
- iHeartRadio Podcast Awards – Nominated for "The Bechdel Cast" (2022)
- Webby Award – Won for Best Limited Series for "Lolita Podcast" (People's Choice Award) (2022)
- Ambies – Nominated for "Best Society and Culture Podcast" for "Sixteenth Minute" (2024)
- Thurber Prize for American Humor– Semi-Finalist for "Raw Dog" (2024)
- Audie Awards – Nominated for "Best Humor Book" for "Raw Dog" (2024)
- iHeartRadio Podcast Awards– Nominated for "Best Overall Host" (2025)
- Webby Award – Won for Best Public Service & Activism Podcast for "We the Unhoused" (2025)
- Webby Award – Won for Best Public Service & Activism Podcast for "We the Unhoused" (People's Choice Award) (2025)
- Signal Award – Won for Best Public Service & Activism Podcast for "We the Unhoused" (People's Choice Award) (2025)
- Signal Award – Won for Best Public Service & Activism Podcast for "We the Unhoused" (2025)
- Webby Award – Nominated for Best Public Service & Activism Podcast for "We the Unhoused" (2026)

== Credits ==
=== Live credits ===
- Death Wish – Writer/Performer/Director (2014)
- Basketball City – Writer (2015)
- Bad Art – Writer/Performer (2015)
- I Lost My Virginity on August 15, 2010 – Writer/Performer (2017)
- The Hacker Who Codes – Writer/Performer (2018)
- Boss, Whom is Girl – Writer/Performer (2019)
- Jamie Loftus, Jamie Loftus – Writer/Performer (2020)
- Mrs. Joey Chestnut America USA - Writer/Performer (2021-2023)
- The Tiny Man is Trying to Kill Me - Writer/Performer (2024)

=== Film and television credits ===
- Boston PD: Zamboni Crimes Division – Writer/Animator/Voice Actor (2016)
- Rat Teens – Writer/Animator/Voice Actor (2017)
- Funny or Die Presents – Actor (2017)
- Super Deluxe – Writer/Actor (2017–18)
- Irrational Fears – Writer/Actor (2018)
- Robot Chicken – Writer/Voice Actor (2018-2021)
- All About Nina – Comedy Consultant/Actor (2018)
- Human Kind Of – Writer/Voice Actor (2018)
- The New Negroes – Actor (2019)
- Magical Girl Friendship Squad - Writer/Voice Actor (2020)
- Teenage Euthanasia - Writer (2021-2023)
- Star Trek: Lower Decks - Writer/Co-Producer (2023)
- StuGo - Writer (2025)
- Amy’s Dead-End Dreamhouse - Actor (2025)
- Crowd Control - Writer/Herself (2025)

=== Weekly podcasts ===
- The Bechdel Cast - Co-hosted with Caitlin Durante (since 2016)
- We the Unhoused - Executive Producer (since 2023)
- Sixteenth Minute (of Fame) (2024-2025)

=== Limited series podcasts ===
- My Year in Mensa (2020)
- Little Fires Everywhere: The Official Podcast (2020) (host only)
- Lolita Podcast (2020)
- Aack Cast (2021)
- Ghost Church (2022)
- The Legend of Swordquest (2024) (host only)

=== Publications ===
- Raw Dog: The Naked Truth About Hot Dogs (2023)
