= Caitlin Durante =

American screenwriter

- Born: May 17, 1986 (age 40); Pennsylvania, United States
- Education: Boston University

Comedy career
- Medium: Stand-up
- Website: www.caitlindurante.com

Caitlin Durante (born May 17, 1986, in Pennsylvania) is an American writer, stand-up comedian, and podcast co-host based in Los Angeles. They are a scriptwriter and story analyst, with a master's degree in screenwriting from Boston University. They would frequently offer writing workshops in Los Angeles and Boston, which are done online as of Spring 2019. They also teach stand-up comedy to seniors at the Los Angeles LGBT Center. They were the program director for the Nerdmelt Showroom comedy venue at Meltdown Comics in Los Angeles from early 2015 until it closed in April 2018.

Durante is the creator and, along with fellow comedian Jamie Loftus, the co-host of The Bechdel Cast, a weekly podcast about the representation of women in film. They are also the creator of a podcast titled Sludge, where they detail their pancreatitis and the removal of their gallbladder in 2019, along with the issues caused by the US medical system.

On June 2, 2022, they announced that they are genderfluid and that their pronouns are 'she' and/or 'they'.
