= Faye Orlove =

American artist and nonprofit founder

Faye Orlove (born September 22, 1990) is an American artist, curator, and business owner based in Los Angeles, California. She is best known for founding Junior High, a nonprofit art space dedicated to amplifying the work of marginalized artists. Her work often centers female, queer, and Jewish perspectives.

== Early life and education ==
Orlove was born on September 22, 1990, in Maryland. She attended Emerson College from 2008 to 2012.

== Career ==
=== Junior High ===
In 2015, Orlove founded Junior High, a nonprofit organization and community art space in Los Angeles created to support and promote artists from marginalized backgrounds. The organization opened a physical space in East Hollywood in 2016, hosting exhibitions, performances, workshops, and community programming.

Junior High received coverage in arts and culture publications for its focus on inclusivity and community-based organizing.

After closing temporarily during the COVID-19 pandemic, the organization reopened in 2021 in Glendale, California. Orlove stepped away from her role at Junior High in 2022 following the birth of her first child. The organization has since continued under new management.

=== Design and creative work ===
In addition to her work with Junior High, Orlove has worked as a designer and creative director. She designed the cover for ''I'm Glad My Mom Died'', a memoir by Jennette McCurdy.

Her work has included collaborations with musicians and artists and has appeared in publications focused on contemporary art and culture.

=== Young Professionals LLC ===
Orlove is a co-founder of Young Professionals LLC, a creative agency specializing in visual identity and branding.

== Artistic themes ==
Across interviews and profiles, Orlove has described her work as centered on community building and creating access for voices that are often excluded from traditional cultural institutions.

== Personal life ==
Orlove lives in Los Angeles, California. She married in 2021 and has two children.
