= Melissa Lozada-Oliva =

American poet

- Born: September 7, 1992 (age 34); Newton, Massachusetts
- Education: Simmons University
- Occupation: Writer

Melissa Lozada-Oliva (born September 7, 1992) is an American poet and educator based in New York. Her poem "Like Totally Whatever" won the 2015 National Poetry Slam Championship and went viral.

== Life and career ==
Lozada-Oliva was born and raised in Newton, Massachusetts, by immigrant parents; her mother is Guatemalan and her father is Colombian. She attended college at Simmons University, where she began to perform slam poetry, and graduated in 2014.

After graduation, she published the chapbooks Plastic Pajaros in 2015 and Rude Girl is Lonely Girl! in 2016. Her performance of a poem called "Like Totally Whatever" won the 2015 National Poetry Slam Championship and received mainstream media coverage. The poem was a response to a Taylor Mali poem called "Totally like whatever, you know?"

Lozada-Oliva enrolled in New York University's MFA program for Creative Writing in fall 2017. As of spring 2019, she was also teaching a class there. She published Peluda through Button Poetry shortly after enrollment. In it, Lozada-Oliva "explores, interrogates and redefines the intersections of Latina identity, feminism, hair removal & what it means to belong."

In December 2018, Lozada-Oliva started a podcast called Say More along with her best friend and fellow poet Olivia Gatwood. The pair interview each other on topics and answer questions from listeners.

Her verse novel Dreaming of You was published by Astra House in 2021. In 2023, her first prose novel Candelaria was published by Astra House.

Beyond All Reasonable Doubt, Jesus Is Alive!: Stories is a finalist for the 2026 Lambda Literary Award for Bisexual Literature.

== Works ==
=== Novels ===
- Dreaming of You. Astra House. 2021. ISBN 978-1-662-60059-3.
- Candelaria. Astra House. 2023. ISBN 978-1-662-60180-4.

=== Poetry ===
Chapbooks

- Plastic Pajaros. Pizza Pi Press. 2015.
- Rude Girl is Lonely Girl!. Pizza Pi Press. 2016.
- Peluda. Button Poetry. 2017. ISBN 978-1-943735-24-2.

=== Compilation Appearances ===
- From the River to the Sea: The Horrible Truth About Palestine - a Fundraiser for the United Palestinian Appeal – Contributes "I Love You in My Dead Grandfather’s Button Down" (Audio Antihero, 2021)

== Awards ==
- 2015 National Poetry Slam Championship
- Brenda Moosey Video Slam winner
