= Gabe Dunn =

American writer, podcaster, actor, and filmmaker

Gabriel Shane Dunn
- Born: June 1, 1988 (age 38)
- Education: Emerson College
- Occupations: Actor; writer; journalist; podcaster
- Years active: 2010–present

Gabriel Shane Dunn (formerly Gaby Dunn; born June 1, 1988) is an American writer, podcaster, actor, and filmmaker. Since 2014, Dunn has hosted the YouTube comedy show and podcast Just Between Us with fellow former BuzzFeed writer Allison Raskin. Dunn also hosts the podcast Bad with Money, which launched in 2016 and which primarily focuses on personal finances, while also discussing subjects including poverty and economic oppression. His debut young adult novel I Hate Everyone but You, co-authored with Raskin, was published in 2017 and made The New York Times Best Seller list. Dunn has also published two finance-related books, as well as a graphic novel. He was formerly a writer, director, and performer for BuzzFeed Video before leaving to focus on Just Between Us.

== Education ==
Dunn attended Emerson College in Boston, Massachusetts where he majored in multimedia journalism and graduated in 2009.

Dunn began performing during his first year at Emerson with the sketch comedy troupe Chocolate Cake City (CCC). Dunn wanted to audition for CCC, but was too scared to do so, until he was urged to take the audition slot of a former boyfriend who had become sick the day before and could not perform. His audition was successful and he became a member of the troupe.

During his second year at Emerson, Dunn began a two-year stint as a crime reporter for The Boston Globe. He worked the 6:30 pm – 2:30 am shift, using a police scanner to monitor potential news, he would then drive to the scene of the crime and write about it. After his junior year, Dunn worked as an intern at The Daily Show with Jon Stewart.

== Writing ==
=== 100 Interviews ===
In October 2010, Dunn created 100 Interviews, a Tumblr blog in which he intended to publish transcripts of 100 interviews, given over the course of a single year, with a variety of different people. Interview subjects included a transgender person, a rocket scientist, an Abraham Lincoln expert, and Stephen Colbert. His initial inspiration for the project stemmed from his personal desire to meet different people and hear their stories. However, Dunn also wanted to offer readers the opportunity to "vicariously meet people" whose lives were different from his own.

Because 100 Interviews was an independent project, Dunn sometimes solicited interviews with candidates in non-traditional and unexpected ways. Children's horror author R. L. Stine agreed to sit for an interview after Dunn "cold-tweeted" him on Twitter. After trying and failing to interview Colbert by crashing a $2,000-a-plate dinner gala, Dunn settled for asking him questions during a pre-show Q&A for The Colbert Report. Dunn's attempts to gain wider exposure for what he called his "diary journalism" were initially met with rejection. Dunn has been recognized as a success case of the use of social media for self-promotion, particularly via Tumblr, the micro-blogging service and web application platform through which he initially self-published his interviews, and Twitter.

In December 2010, The Village Voice named 100 Interviews the "Best Tumblr" in their annual Web Awards. New York Times culture editor Adam Sternbergh also discovered Dunn via 100 Interviews, and invited him to write for the Times.

=== Freelance and staff writing ===
Dunn began doing freelance writing for publications including Thought Catalog and GOOD. In 2012, he began writing a regular column in The New York Times titled "They're Famous! (On the Internet)", which profiled various Internet personalities. In 2013, Dunn was a staff writer for Thought Catalog. A collection of his essays for Thought Catolog was published under the title Maybe In Another Universe in 2013.

=== Books ===
Dunn wrote his debut novel, I Hate Everyone but You, with Allison Raskin and published it on September 5, 2017. The young adult fiction novel follows two college freshmen and best friends, and is told through emails and text messages exchanged between the two. It made The New York Times Best Seller list in October of the same year. Dunn and Raskin published a sequel in July 2019, titled Please Send Help.

In January 2019, Dunn published Bad With Money: The Imperfect Art of Getting Your Financial Sh*t Together, a book based on the podcast. In June 2022, he published a second finance-related book titled Stimulus Wreck: Rebuilding After a Financial Disaster.

In October 2019, Dunn published his debut graphic novel, Bury the Lede, which was illustrated by Claire Roe and published by BOOM! Studios. It is a queer crime thriller that was inspired by Dunn's own experiences working as a young reporter at the Boston Globe.

== YouTube and podcasting ==
Dunn became well known as a member of BuzzFeed Video's early cohort of video personalities. Dunn first appeared in BuzzFeed videos as a performer, later also taking on responsibilities as a writer and producer. He left BuzzFeed in 2015 to focus on his other projects, including Just Between Us. He was also a producer of the independent community radio station WFMU.

=== Just Between Us ===
In April 2014, Dunn created a comedic variety YouTube show with his best friend Allison Raskin called Just Between Us. The two play characters based on themselves: Dunn plays a sex-positive, bisexual, feminist in contrast to Raskin's uptight, straight, single character. They began with giving love advice, then added comedy sketches. The advice show sometimes features guests, which in the past have included family members and close friends. As of February 2023, Just Between Us had around 646,000 subscribers and more than 178 million views on YouTube. In March 2019, Dunn and Raskin launched a podcast version of the show.

=== Bad with Money ===
In August 2016, Dunn began the podcast Bad with Money with the intent of exposing and analyzing money problems that he felt were not openly discussed. He has used the podcast to discuss his own financial experiences in regards to debt and his career, talk about systematic financial systems in place that make finances difficult, and give advice. His guests have included financial advisor Suze Orman and New Yorker journalist Jane Mayer.

=== Apocalypse Untreated ===
In 2020, Dunn created, wrote, and starred in Apocalypse Untreated, a post-apocalyptic fiction podcast about teenagers in a wilderness rehab and troubled teen program trying to survive after a meteor strike. The podcast was co-written with Brittani Nichols, and published through the Audible Originals program.

== Film and television ==
Dunn has written several movie scripts, and has sold several pilots. Dunn played the recurring character of Brie in Take My Wife, a television series that aired from 2016 to 2018. In 2018, he worked as a writer on Netflix's animated sitcom Big Mouth.

In December 2022, Dunn's directorial debut short film Grindr Baby was selected for Frameline Voices 2023, a curated program of short films and episodic content representing experiences unique to LGBTQ+ people and communities.

== Personal life ==
Dunn is transgender and uses he/him pronouns. He first came out in a July 5, 2021, interview on the Gender Reveal podcast, in which he said he had been exploring his gender and was probably non-binary. In January 2023, Dunn revealed via social media that he had changed his name to Gabriel Shane ("Gabe"). Dunn later came out as trans.

Dunn is bisexual and polyamorous. He is Jewish. He has bipolar disorder, and his hope to see the disorder more accurately portrayed in media in part motivated him to create Apocalypse Untreated. Dunn was engaged to musician Mal Blum in 2021. They have since broke up.

== Works ==
=== Books ===
Year	Title	Notes
2013	Maybe In Another Universe	
2017	I Hate Everyone but You	with Allison Raskin
2019	Please Send Help	with Allison Raskin
2019	Bad With Money: The Imperfect Art of Getting Your Financial Sh*t Together	
2019	Bury the Lede	
2022	Stimulus Wreck: Rebuilding After a Financial Disaster	

=== Films ===
- Grindr Baby (2023)
