= Kate Cheka =

English comedian (born 1989)

- Born: Katherine Cheka Holland; 1989 (age 36–37)
- Education: Wolfson College, Cambridge; Humboldt University of Berlin
- Years active: 2019–present
- Website: katecheka.co.uk

Katherine Cheka Holland (born 1989) is an English comedian. She won the 2023 Funny Women Award.

== Early life ==
Cheka was brought up by a single mother in South London and then Wiltshire. She graduated with a Bachelor of Arts (BA) from Wolfson College, Cambridge and a Master of Arts (MA) in Global Studies from Humboldt University of Berlin. She also studied abroad at Jawaharlal Nehru University in India.

== Career ==
Cheka began her career in the English-language comedy scene in Berlin, starting the Shows B4 Bros open mic night. She was nominated for the 2019 Berlin New Stand-up Award and competed for the BBC New Comedy Award. In 2020, she hosted a podcast titled Love in the Time Of for THF Radio Berlin as well as Mixtape Menage.

Cheka collaborated with Suzie Preece on a show for the 2021 Edinburgh Fringe Festival titled Katie and Suzie: Split-Billed Platypus. That same year, Cheka signed with the agency Comedy Store. Cheka won the 2023 Funny Women Award for her live stage work. Cheka was nominated for Best Newcomer at the 2024 Chortle Awards.

Cheka premiered her debut solo show Kate Cheka: A Messiah Comes at the 2025 Edinburgh Fringe Festival. Rachael Healy of The Guardian named her one of the "funniest comedians at the fringe". Cheka subsequently brought the show on tour to the Leicester Comedy Festival, Brighton Fringe, Cambridge Fringe Festival, and the Exeter and Hastings Comedy festival in 2025.

In 2026, Cheka returned to Edinburgh Fringe with her next show The Last Funny Woman. It was shortlisted for Best Show at the ISH Edinburgh Comedy Awards.

== Personal life ==
Cheka is bisexual.
