= Allison Raskin =

American comedian, writer, and YouTuber (born 1989)

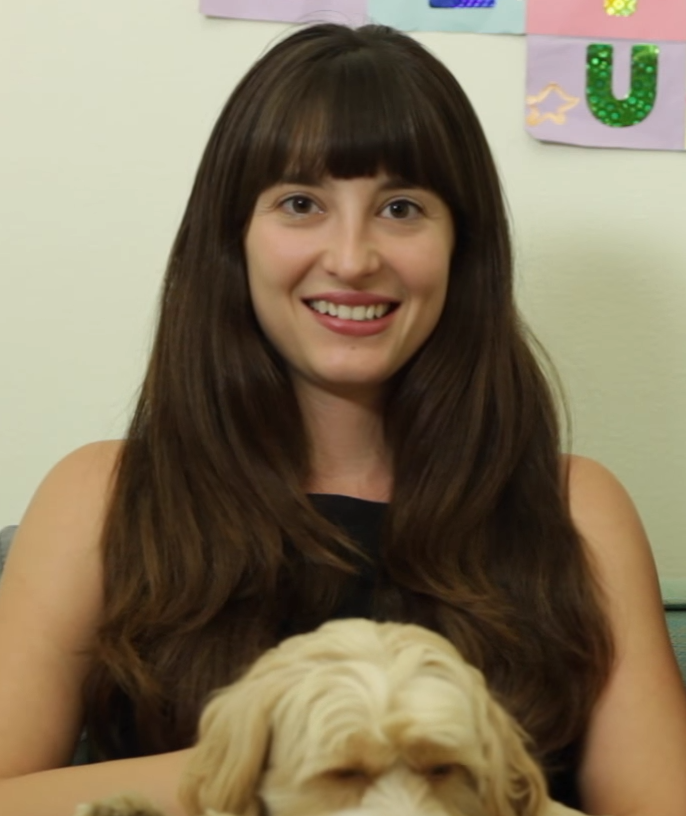
- Raskin in 2016
- Born: Allison Beth Raskin; June 20, 1989 (age 37); New York City, New York, U.S.
- Education: University of Southern California; Pepperdine University
- Occupations: Writer; director; comedian; Youtuber; podcaster
- Years active: 2014–present
- Spouse: John Blakeslee
- Children: 1

Allison Beth Raskin (born June 20, 1989) is an American writer, director, comedian, YouTuber, and podcaster. She previously worked as a writer at BuzzFeed Video, but left in 2015 with fellow writer and friend Gabe Dunn to pursue work on their comedy YouTube channel, "Just Between Us."

Raskin has written for Elle, NBC News Think, and Splinter News. On September 5, 2017, she and Dunn released a joint novel, I Hate Everyone but You, which reached the top ten on The New York Times best sellers list.

== Early life and education ==
Raskin was born on June 20, 1989, in Manhattan, New York to a Jewish family. She attended the University of Southern California and received a Bachelor's of Fine Arts degree. In 2020, she began a clinical psychology program with an emphasis in Marriage and Family Therapy at Pepperdine University.

Raskin is outspoken about her struggles with mental health. When she was 4 years old she was diagnosed with obsessive–compulsive disorder (OCD), and continued to experience anxiety and depression. She took medication until she was 21, then took a seven-year break, which included therapy. When she was 28, she went back on medication and experienced backlash regarding weight gain due to side effects.

== Career ==
=== BuzzFeed ===
Raskin was a writer at BuzzFeed video where she was featured in a number of videos, both by herself and with Dunn. She and Dunn left in 2015 to commit to the JBU YouTube channel. They cited the difficulties of working with Buzzfeed, which wanted to limit their time on JBU. They stated it was the scariest decision they'd had to make.

=== Just Between Us ===
Raskin and Dunn co-created the "Just Between Us" YouTube channel in 2014. A self-described odd couple, they play versions of themselves in sketch comedy videos and discuss relevant topics such as mental health, friendships, and relationships in their show of the same name, Just Between Us. They also started a podcast under the same name in March 2019, where they have guests discuss topics and answer prompts. This includes a section entitled "Hypotheticals", where Raskin asks Dunn and guests questions such as, "Would you stay with this cheater?"

=== Gossip ===
With the help of Stitcher, Raskin created Gossip, a 12-episode scripted podcast, which chronicles three female friends as they meet each week to discuss gossip surrounding their suburban town. The podcast ran from June 2018 to August 2018.

=== Books ===
Raskin's first novel, I Hate Everyone But You, co-written with Gabe Dunn, was published on September 5, 2017. The sequel, Please Send Help, was released on July 16, 2019. In 2022, Raskin released her non-fiction debut, Overthinking About You: Navigating Romantic Relationships When You Have Anxiety, OCD And/Or Depression. She released her second non-fiction book, I Do (I Think): Conversations About Modern Marriage in 2024. Her fifth book and third novel, Save the Date, is set to be released in 2025.

== Personal life ==
On August 20, 2023, Raskin married her partner, John Blakeslee. In 2025, Raskin started a marriage-themed podcast with her husband. In 2025, Raskin and Blakeslee welcomed their first child.

Her mother, Ruth Raskin, died in September 2024 after being diagnosed with Creutzfeldt–Jakob disease.

== Books ==
- Raskin, Allison and Dunn, Gabe. I Hate Everyone But You (2017)
- Raskin, Allison and Dunn, Gabe. Please Send Help: A Novel (2019)
- Raskin, Allison. Overthinking About You: Navigating Romantic Relationships When You Have Anxiety, OCD, and/or Depression (2022)
- Raskin, Allison. I Do (I Think): Conversations About Modern Marriage (2024)
- Raskin, Allison. Save the Date (2025)
