= Durba Mitra =

American historian

- Occupation: Professor

Academic background
- Education: Emory University (PhD)

Academic work
- Discipline: Gender studies
- Institutions: Harvard University

Durba Mitra is an American historian, academic, and professor at Harvard University. Her work is focused on the intersection of feminist theory and queer studies.

== Early life and education ==
Mitra was raised by a single mother in Fargo, North Dakota. Her mother was from India and immigrated to the United States to pursue a Ph.D. in statistics. Mitra has spoken of the significant influence of her mother on her own life, stating in interviews that the role her mother played helped spark her interest in gender studies.

Mitra originally intended on becoming a doctor and attending medical school before attending Emory University for her Ph.D. in history. Mitra received her Ph.D. in 2013, along with a certificate in women's, gender, and sexuality studies. Her doctoral thesis focused on perceptions of women's sexuality, particularly notions of deviance, influenced discussions on law, science, and societal reform during British colonial rule.

== Career ==
After receiving her PhD, Mitra became an assistant professor of history at Fordham University in New York City. In 2015, Mitra became a Mellon Fellow at the University of Pennsylvania. In 2017, Mitra joined Harvard University, where she became the first full-time faculty member in women's, gender, and sexuality studies. She serves as a consulting editor of the Journal of the History of Ideas and an associate at the Weatherhead Center.

Mitra's work focuses on sex and sexuality, particularly in South Asia. She has written and spoken extensively about feminism and postcolonialism.

== Bibliography ==
- Indian Sex Life: Sexuality and the Colonial Origins of Modern Social Thought (Princeton University Press, 2020)
- n.d. The Future That Was: Feminist Thought in the Decolonizing World (under contract with Princeton University Press)
