= Olivia Gatwood =

American poet

- Born: February 23, 1992 (age 34); Albuquerque, New Mexico, U.S.
- Occupation: Poet
- Website: oliviagatwood.com

Olivia Gatwood (born February 23, 1992) is a poet, writer, and educator on topics that include coming of age, feminism, gendered violence, & true crime.

== Early life and education ==
Olivia Gatwood was born in Albuquerque, New Mexico on February 23, 1992. Her mother, Jill, is a sex educator and H.I.V. epidemiologist and her father, Byron, is a middle school teacher. She spent three years in Port of Spain, Trinidad and Tobago where she began writing poetry at age 11 at the suggestion of a librarian.

Gatwood's continued interest in poetry stemmed from her use of the art form as an outlet for her emotions; in an interview she explained, "teenagers have a lot of feelings and thoughts, but are often told that there's no space for those things to exist. But spoken word is the exact opposite. The more you can express, the better."

While still in high school, Gatwood led a collection of women who reported a local bakery to the U.S. Equal Employment Opportunity Commission for sexual harassment and won a settlement of over $10,000.

Gatwood graduated from the Pratt Institute's fiction program in 2015.

== Career ==
Gatwood is a poet, writer, activist, speaker, and educator on topics that include sexual assault prevention and recovery. Gatwood was a finalist at Brave New Voices, Women of the World and the National Poetry Slam. Her performances have been featured on HBO, Huffington Post, MTV, VH1, and BBC among others. Her work has been featured in Muzzle Magazine, The Winter Tangerine Review, Poetry City U.S.A., Tinderbox Poetry Journal, and The Missouri Review.

Gatwood and fellow poet Megan Falley created an interactive show called Speak Like a Girl, a traveling poetry show that focuses on gender issues, body image, growing up and other topics. The pair has performed "Speak Like a Girl" in cities across the United States, including Chicago, New York, Los Angeles, and Detroit.

Gatwood is the author of two poetry collections, New American Best Friend (2017) and Life of the Party (2019). She also contributed to Woke: A Young Poet's Call to Justice (2020, with Mahogany L. Browne and Elizabeth Acevedo). Her first novel, Whoever You Are, Honey, was released by The Dial Press at Random House in 2024. It was named one of Vogue's best books of 2024.

== Works ==
=== New American Best Friend ===
After numerous published poems, Gatwood presented her first published collection, New American Best Friend. In it, Gatwood wrote about her childhood, the transition from teenage years to young adulthood, her views on gender and sexuality, and the violence and joys in her life. “One more thing when they call you a bitch, say thank you. say thank you, very much.” quote from the book.

In 2017, New American Best Friend was nominated for the Goodreads Choice Awards Best Poetry.

=== Life of the Party ===
Life of the Party interrogates the author's relationship to fear and true crime, as well as the media's obsession with the murder of women. It was published in August 2019 by Penguin Random House.

=== Podcast ===
In December 2018, Gatwood started the podcast, Say More, with "her best friend and fellow poet", Melissa Lozada-Oliva, in which they interview each other on topics and answer emailed questions from listeners. It had presented its fortieth episode by the end of 2019.

The second season of the podcast began March 4, 2020 with episode 41, "AMERICAN DIRT, REPRESENTATION & TECH BROS."

== Selected poems ==
Many of her recorded readings can be found on Gatwood's website and at Button Poetry. Among her most widely recognized and lauded poems are the following:

- "Jordan Convinced Me That Pads Were Disgusting" (2016)
- "When The Prettiest Girl in School Asks to Play Cricket at Recess" (2016)
- "Bubblegum or Bruise" (2016)
- "Hey Science" (2016)
- "Liberty" (2016)
- "Two Poems" (2017)
- "Poetry Suite" (2017)
- "Ode to the Women on Long Island" (2017)
- Aileen Wurnos Takes A Lover Home (2019)
- "Backpedal" (2019)
- All Of The Missing Girls Are Hanging Out Without Us (2019)
- Girl (2019)
- Mans/Laughter (2019)
- Murder Of A Little Beauty (2019)
- My Grandmother Asks Why I Don't Trust Men (2019)
- My Mother Says I Wasn't A Bad Girl (2019)
- Ode To Pink (2019)
- "The Autocross" (2019)
- She Lit Up Every Room She Walked Into (2019)
- We All Got Burnt That Summer (2019)
- "Alternate Universe in Which I am Unfazed by the Men Who do Not Love Me"
- "Manic Pixie Dream Girl"
- "Ode to my Bitch Face"

== Personal life ==
As of February 2020, Gatwood resides in Santa Cruz, California.

== Further reading and viewing ==
- Albert, Victoria & Gatwood, Olivia (February 17, 2018). "Poet Olivia Gatwood Writes Like Teen Spirit: BUST Interview". BUST.com. Archived from the original on 2018-02-17.
- Gatwood, Olivia (September 5, 2019). Olivia Gatwood performs poems from LIFE OF THE PARTY, The Bell House, Brooklyn (streaming video). New York, NY: Penguin Random House. "0:00—Girl; 3:00—My Mother Says I Wasn't A Bad Girl; 6:15—We All Got Burnt That Summer; 9:15—My Grandmother Asks Why I Don't Trust Men; 12:06 Mans/Laughter; 16:40—Murder Of A Little Beauty; 18:05—She Lit Up Every Room She Walked Into; 20:38—Aileen Wurnos Takes A Lover Home; 24:10—Ode To Pink; 26:23—All Of The Missing Girls Are Hanging Out Without Us".
