= Jubilee Tour =

2021–23 concert tour by Japanese Breakfast

- World tour by Japanese Breakfast
- Location: North America, Europe, South America, Asia
- Associated album: Jubilee
- Start date: July 21, 2021
- End date: October 31, 2023
- Legs: 9
- No. of shows: 135

Japanese Breakfast concert chronology
- Soft Sounds from Another Planet Tour; Jubilee Tour

The Jubilee Tour was the third headlining concert tour from American indie rock musician Japanese Breakfast.

== Background ==
In June 2021, Japanese Breakfast released their third full-length album. Two months prior, the band announced North American tour dates in support of the new album. In June 2021, the band announced new tour dates and additional dates in certain cities. In 2022, the band announced more North American tour dates, with The Linda Lindas opening, as well as dates with Yo La Tengo and dates in Asia, Europe and South America. The band originally had announced European tour dates for early 2022, but postponed them due to the COVID-19 pandemic. The shows were performed in October 2022. In 2023, the band played a mix of headlining and festival dates across North America and Europe.

== Critical reception ==
The tour received positive reviews. In The Harvard Crimson, Samantha Chung wrote, "Zauner was completely at home on the stage, bringing her charisma and passion to the large venue. She loves to perform, and she wanted the audience to know it." In The Guardian, Kitty Empire wrote, "With all this glamour flying around, it's comforting to see that she remains so committed to her first calling. Tonight’s set is expansive, and balances heartrending songs such as In Heaven with the slow-build of Posing for Cars, a highlight of the encore that begins with Zauner performing solo, with the rest of the band filtering in to lift the track to a crescendo." Joshua Mellin wrote in NME, "Watching it all unfold feels like being saddled behind the wheel of a magic school bus, staring through the windshield at a morphing visual spiralling through universes, and revving up to launch into the unknown. It's just a shame every venue doesn’t come with it's [sic] own trans-dimensional vehicle."

== Set list ==
The band played these songs in Chicago, Illinois, on October 10, 2021; other shows had different set lists.

1. Paprika
2. Be Sweet
3. In Heaven
4. The Woman That Loves You
5. Kokomo, IN
6. Ballad 0 (Bumper cover)
7. Savage Good Boy
8. Road Head
9. Here You Come Again (Barry Mann cover)
10. Boyish (Little Big League cover)
11. The Body Is A Blade
12. Tactics
13. Glider
14. Posing in Bondage
15. Slide Tackle
16. Everybody Wants to Love You
17. Posing for Cars
18. Diving Woman

== Tour dates ==
List of concerts, showing date, city, country, venue, and opening acts
Date	City	Country	Venue	Opening acts
Leg 1 – North America
July 21, 2021	Silver Spring	United States	The Fillmore	Mannequin Pussy
July 22, 2021	Richmond	United States	The National	Mannequin Pussy
July 23, 2021	Asheville	United States	The Orange Peel	Mannequin Pussy
July 24, 2021	Atlanta	United States	The Masquerade	Mannequin Pussy
July 25, 2021	Birmingham	United States	Saturn	Mannequin Pussy
July 26, 2021	Carrboro	United States	Cat's Cradle	Mannequin Pussy
July 28, 2021	Asbury Park	United States	Asbury Lanes	Mannequin Pussy
July 30, 2021	Jersey City	United States	White Eagle Hall	Mannequin Pussy
July 31, 2021	Omaha	United States	Maha Music Festival	—N/a
August 2, 2021	Holyoke	United States	Gateway City Arts	Mannequin Pussy
August 3, 2021	Rochester	United States	Anthology	Mannequin Pussy
August 4, 2021	Detroit	United States	Saint Andrew's Hall	Mannequin Pussy
August 5, 2021	Cleveland	United States	Agora Theatre and Ballroom	Mannequin Pussy
August 6, 2021	Philadelphia	United States	Union Transfer	Mannequin Pussy
August 7, 2021	Philadelphia	United States	Union Transfer	Mannequin Pussy
August 8, 2021	Philadelphia	United States	Union Transfer	Mannequin Pussy
August 10, 2021	Philadelphia	United States	Union Transfer	The Spirit of the Beehive
August 28, 2021	Lexington	United States	Railbird Music Festival	—N/a
September 10, 2021	Boston	United States	Royale	Luna Li
September 11, 2021	Asbury Park	United States	The Stone Pony Summerstage	—N/a
September 12, 2021	Harrisburg	United States	Harrisburg Midtown Arts Center	Luna Li
September 14, 2021	Columbus	United States	Columbus Athenaeum	Luna Li
September 15, 2021	Chicago	United States	Thalia Hall	Luna Li
September 16, 2021	Chicago	United States	Thalia Hall	Luna Li
September 17, 2021	Milwaukee	United States	Turner Hall Ballroom	Luna Li
September 18, 2021	Madison	United States	Majestic Theatre	Luna Li
September 19, 2021	Minneapolis	United States	First Avenue	Luna Li
September 21, 2021	Ogden	United States	Ogden Twilight	—N/a
September 23, 2021	Boise	United States	Treefort Music Fest	—N/a
September 24, 2021	Eugene	United States	W.O.W. Hall	Luna Li
September 25, 2021	Seattle	United States	Neptune Theatre	Luna Li
September 26, 2021	Seattle	United States	Neptune Theatre	Luna Li
September 27, 2021	Vancouver	Canada	Vogue Theatre	Luna Li
September 28, 2021	Portland	United States	Crystal Ballroom	Luna Li
September 30, 2021	San Francisco	United States	Regency Center	Luna Li
October 1, 2021	San Francisco	United States	Regency Center	Luna Li
October 2, 2021	Los Angeles	United States	Regent Theatre	Luna Li
October 3, 2021	Los Angeles	United States	Regent Theatre	Luna Li
October 4, 2021	San Diego	United States	The Observatory North Park	Luna Li
October 5, 2021	Las Vegas	United States	Brooklyn Bowl Las Vegas	Luna Li
October 7, 2021	Santa Fe	United States	Meow Wolf	Luna Li
October 8, 2021	Denver	United States	Ogden Theatre	Luna Li
October 9, 2021	Lawrence	United States	Granada Theater	Luna Li
October 10, 2021	Saint Louis	United States	Delmar Hall	Luna Li
October 11, 2021	Chicago	United States	Thalia Hall	Luna Li
October 12, 2021	Chicago	United States	Thalia Hall	Luna Li
October 14, 2021	Brooklyn	United States	Brooklyn Steel	Luna Li
October 15, 2021	Brooklyn	United States	Brooklyn Steel	Luna Li
October 16, 2021	Brooklyn	United States	Brooklyn Steel	Luna Li
October 30, 2021	Houston	United States	White Oak Music Hall	Sasami
November 3, 2021	Tucson	United States	Hotel Congress	Sasami
November 4, 2021	Tempe	United States	Coca-Cola Sun Deck	Sasami
November 9, 2021	Sacramento	United States	Ace of Spades	Sasami
November 11, 2021	Sonoma	United States	Gundlach Bundschu	Sasami
November 12, 2021	San Luis Obispo	United States	Madonna Inn	Sasami
November 13, 2021	Santa Cruz	United States	The Catalyst	Sasami
November 15, 2021	Pomona	United States	The Glass House	Sasami
November 16, 2021	Pomona	United States	The Glass House	Sasami
Leg 2 – North America
April 23, 2022	Indio	United States	Coachella	—N/a
April 30, 2022	Atlanta	United States	Shaky Knees Music Festival	—N/a
May 5, 2022	Pittsburgh	United States	Roxian Theater	Great Time
May 7, 2022	Norfolk	United States	The NorVa	Barrie
May 14, 2022	Winnoski	United States	Waking Windows Music & Arts Festival	—N/a
May 15, 2022	Houston	United States	We Are One Music & Arts Festival	—N/a
May 28, 2022	North Adams	United States	Solid Sound Music Festival	—N/a
May 29, 2022	Allston	United States	Boston Calling Music Festival	—N/a
June 4, 2022	Bloomington	United States	Granfalloon Festival	—N/a
June 12, 2022	Queens	United States	Governors Ball Music Festival	—N/a
June 14, 2022	Raleigh	United States	The Ritz	—N/a
June 15, 2022	Vienna	United States	Wolf Trap National Park for the Performing Arts	—N/a
June 16, 2022	Charlotte	United States	The Underground	Trace Mountains
June 15, 2022	Manchester	United States	Bonnaroo Music Festival	—N/a
July 8, 2022	Des Moines	United States	80/35 Music Festival	—N/a
July 9, 2022	Winnipeg	Canada	Winnipeg Folk Festival	—N/a
July 11, 2022	Minneapolis	United States	First Avenue	The Linda Lindas
July 12, 2022	Omaha	United States	Slowdown	The Linda Lindas
July 14, 2022	Bloomington	United States	The Castle Theater	The Linda Lindas
July 15, 2022	St. Louis	United States	The Pageant	The Linda Lindas
July 16, 2022	Chicago	United States	Pitchfork Music Festival	—N/a
July 17, 2022	Kalamazoo	United States	Bell's Brewery	The Linda Lindas
July 19, 2022	Toronto	Canada	History	Barrie
July 20, 2022	Montreal	Canada	Beanfield Theatre	Barrie
July 23, 2022	Philadelphia	The Dell Music Center	United States	Yo La Tengo Cate Le Bon
August 14, 2022	Seattle	Day in Day Out Festival	United States	—N/a
August 26, 2022	Stanford	Frost Amphitheater	United States	—N/a
September 2, 2022	Nelsonville	Nelsonville Music Festival	United States	—N/a
September 3, 2022	Denver	Mission Ballroom	United States	—N/a
September 15, 2022	Louisville	Bourbon & Beyond	United States	—N/a
September 28, 2022	New Haven	College Street Music Hall	United States	—N/a
September 29, 2022	Boston	Roadrunner	United States	—N/a
September 30, 2022	Baltimore	Baltimore Soundstage	United States	Trace Mountains
Leg 3 – Europe
October 19, 2022	London	England	Hackney	Barrie
October 20, 2022	Bristol	England	Marble Factory	Barrie
October 21, 2022	Leeds	England	Brudenell Social Club	Barrie
October 22, 2022	Glasgow	Scotland	Old Fruitmarket	Barrie
October 24, 2022	Manchester	England	Albert Hall	Barrie
October 25, 2022	London	England	O2 Forum Kentish Town	Barrie
October 26, 2022	Amsterdam	Netherlands	Paradiso Grote Zaal	Barrie
October 27, 2022	Berlin	Germany	Gretchen	Barrie
Leg 4 – South America
November 6, 2022	São Paulo	Brazil	Primavera Sound	—N/a
November 8, 2022	Rio de Janeiro	Brazil	Primavera Sound	—N/a
November 10, 2022	Santiago	Chile	Primavera Sound	—N/a
November 12, 2022	Santiago	Chile	Primavera Sound	—N/a
Leg 5 – North America
December 4, 2022	Phoenix	United States	ZONA Music Festival	—N/a
Leg 6 – Asia
January 28, 2023	Mumbai	India	Lollapalooza India	—N/a
Leg 7 – North America
March 18, 2023	Tampa	United States	Innings Music Festival	—N/a
May 12, 2023	Salt Lake City	United States	Kilby Block Party	—N/a
May 28, 2023	Atlantic City	United States	Adjacent Music Festival	—N/a
Leg 8 – Europe
June 2, 2023	Barcelona	Spain	Primavera Sound	—N/a
June 4, 2023	Barcelona	Spain	Primavera Sound	—N/a
June 8, 2023	Porto	Portugal	Primavera Sound	—N/a
June 9, 2023	Madrid	Spain	Primavera Sound	—N/a
June 11, 2023	Hilvarenbeek	Netherlands	Best Kept Secret	—N/a
June 15, 2023	Sonnenberg	Switzerland	B-Sides Festival	—N/a
June 17, 2023	Camaiore	Italy	La Prima Estate	—N/a
June 24, 2023	Luxembourg	Luxembourg	Siren's Call	—N/a
June 27, 2023	London	England	Roundhouse	Indigo De Souza
June 30, 2023	Roskilde	Denmark	Roskilde Festival	—N/a
June 30, 2023	Stockholm	Sweden	Lollapalooza Stockholm	—N/a
Leg 9 – North America
July 9, 2023	Milwaukee	United States	Summerfest	—N/a
July 9, 2023	Chicago	United States	The Salt Shed	Frankie Cosmos
July 10, 2023	Chicago	United States	The Salt Shed	Frankie Cosmos
August 6, 2023	Montreal	Canada	Osheaga Festival	—N/a
August 19, 2023	Portland	United States	Pioneer Courthouse Square	Built to Spill
August 20, 2023	Seattle	United States	Woodland Park Zoo	Built to Spill
August 25, 2023	Abiquiu	United States	Ghost Ranch Music Festival	—N/a
August 27, 2023	Martha's Vineyard	United States	Beach Road Weekend	—N/a
September 7, 2023	Raleigh	United States	Hopscotch Music Festival	—N/a
September 27, 2023	Los Angeles	United States	Walt Disney Concert Hall	Ichiko Aoba
September 28, 2023	Los Angeles	United States	Walt Disney Concert Hall	Ichiko Aoba
September 29, 2023	Dana Point	United States	Ohana Festival	—N/a
October 5, 2023	New York City	United States	Radio City Music Hall	Ichiko Aoba
October 9, 2023	Austin	United States	Austin City Limits	—N/a
October 15, 2023	Austin	United States	Stubb's BBQ	Dehd
October 16, 2023	Austin	United States	Austin City Limits	—N/a
October 31, 2023	Philadelphia	United States	The Fillmore	Hop Along
