= Be Sweet =

2021 single by Japanese Breakfast

Single by Japanese Breakfast

from the album Jubilee
- Released: March 2, 2021
- Recorded: 2019
- Genre: Synth-pop; new wave; indie pop; dream pop; funk
- Length: 3:15
- Label: Dead Oceans
- Songwriters: Michelle Zauner; Jack Tatum
- Producers: Michelle Zauner; Craig Hendrix; Jack Tatum

Japanese Breakfast singles chronology
"Head over Heels" (2019)	"Be Sweet" (2021)	"Posing in Bondage" (2021)

Music video
- "Be Sweet" on YouTube

"Be Sweet" is a song by American indie pop band Japanese Breakfast, released on March 2, 2021, as the lead single from their third studio album Jubilee. The band's lead vocalist Michelle Zauner co-wrote the song with Jack Tatum, the founder and lead singer of the indie rock project Wild Nothing. Zauner's bandmate, Craig Hendrix, encouraged her to compose arrangements for Jubilee; the two of them, along with Tatum, worked on the track's production.

Though the band's work previously dealt with Zauner's personal struggles with grief, "Be Sweet" saw them divert from their usual indie rock sound and lean more into a pop direction. Recorded in 2019, the song is a synth-pop, new wave, indie pop, dream pop, and funk track. The song received praise from critics, who lauded its joyful, vibrant sound. The band would release various alternative and cover versions of the song, while also performing it frequently at festivals and on television late night and talk shows.

== Background, recording, and release ==
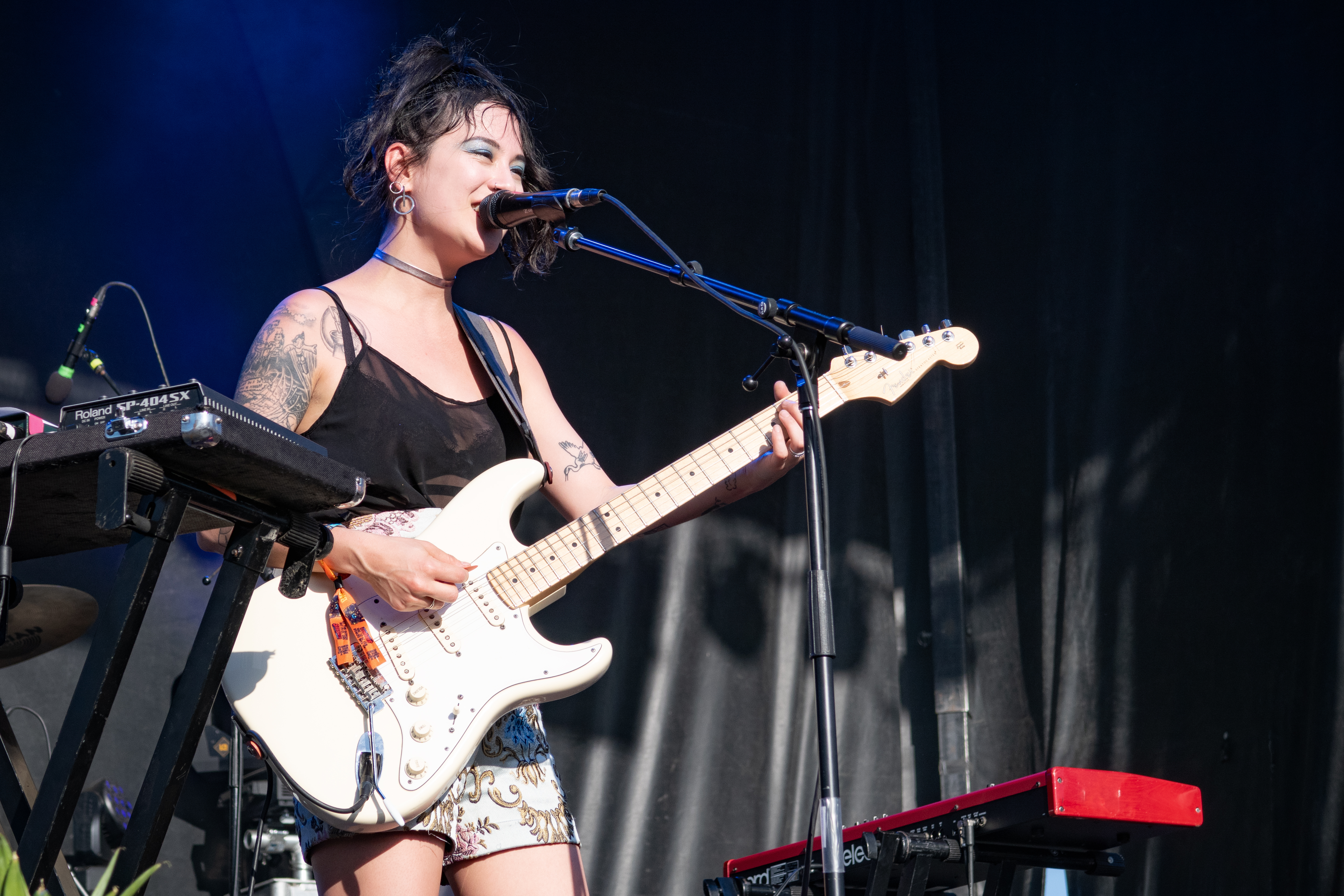
Japanese Breakfast's frontwoman Michelle Zauner in 2018

Japanese Breakfast's first two studio albums, Psychopomp (2016) and Soft Sounds from Another Planet (2017) were recognized by music critics and listeners for reflecting the personal grief of lead singer Michelle Zauner. In the interim years between Soft Sounds and Jubilee, Zauner studied music theory and piano. Her bandmate and co-producer Craig Hendrix also encouraged her to help compose the album's string and horn arrangements.

Zauner commented on her efforts on the album's creation, stating "After spending the last five years writing about grief, I wanted our follow up to be about joy," and adding, "For me, a third record should feel bombastic and so I wanted to pull out all the stops for this one." The band leaned into a more pop sound for "Be Sweet"; Zauner stated that Björk and Kate Bush "who are essentially pop musicians with mass appeal — but they're both really fucking weird," helped inspire the band to explore pop.

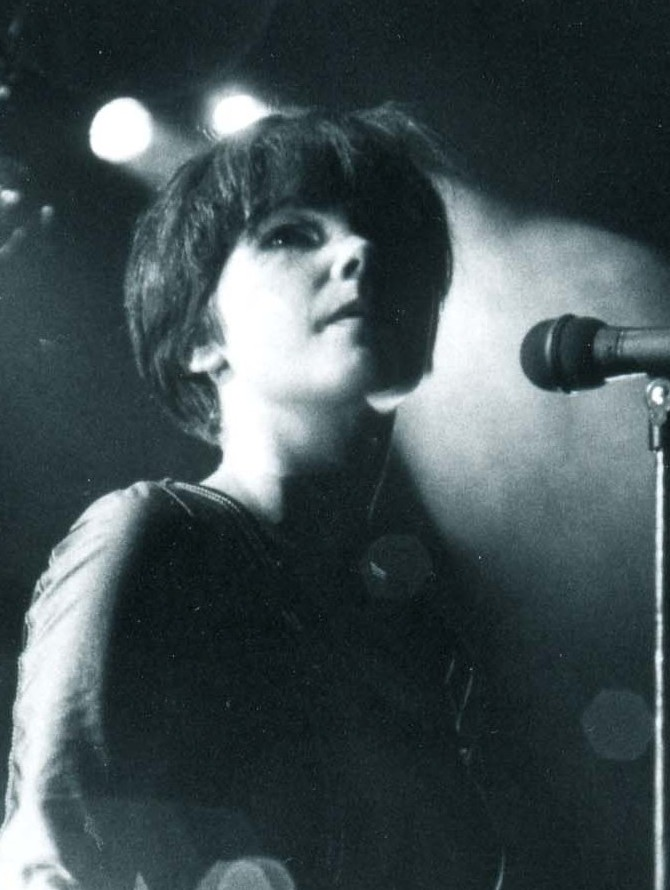
Björk and Kate Bush helped inspire Zauner to lean into a more pop sound on "Be Sweet"

Zauner co-wrote "Be Sweet" with Jack Tatum of Wild Nothing. According to Zauner, this was a result of a meeting instigated by their label Dead Oceans who made them collaborate on a song. Jubilee's album notes credit Zauner, Hendrix, and Tatum as producers for the song. Hendrix handled much of the album's drumming and production. Jubilee was recorded in 2019 and slated for release in 2020. The album's release was eventually postponed to 2021, with the delay attributed to the COVID-19 pandemic. In January 2021, the band then tweeted "LP3 coming", teasing the album's release.

The song was released as Jubilee's lead single on March 2, 2021, through Dead Oceans. The record label simultaneously announced the album's release date for June 4 later that year. "Be Sweet" is the second track on Jubilee; Zauner stated that while "Paprika" was planned to be the album's opening track, only a track like "Be Sweet" could follow it up, stating "that's the sort of sucker punch, this real in-your-face pop number."

== Composition ==
"Be Sweet" has been described as synth-pop, new wave, indie pop, dream pop, and funk. The song leaned away from the band's indie rock sound and into a more pop direction. Zauner admitted she was anxious about how the pop sound of "Be Sweet" would be received, telling Rolling Stone, "I really worried that everyone was going to get mad at me and think I was, like, going full-on pop." She further stated that the song is "obviously [the band's] poppiest" and most "radio-ready", but maintained that "the rest of the songs [on Jubilee] are really wacky and weird." The song features "light synths and shuffling percussion" in its production. The track's opening line, "Tell the men I'm coming" was inspired by the title of the author Raymond Carver's short story "Tell The Women We're Going."

== Reception ==
The track received positive reviews by music critics, with many noting it featuring a joyful sound hearkening back to the sound of 1980s pop music. (Note: Sources that share such an opinion of "Be Sweet" include:) In his review of Jubilee, Will Richards of NME praised "Be Sweet", calling it "a superbly catchy, '80s-indebted pop smash" with a "triumphant chorus." Ian Carlos Campbell of The Verge called the song "summer-y and eminently danceable." Quinn Moreland of Pitchfork wrote that "Be Sweet" is a "touch of pop extravagance à la Kate Bush, one of Zauner's main influences; the extended, windswept indie-guitar-hero moment we've come to expect in the genre, that feels somehow indebted to Nels Cline. Through it all, she emanates an outward electricity and deep interiority." Writing for the same publication, Cat Zhang commented that the song is "more buoyant and colorful than most of [Zauner's] previous music." She felt that the song "rattles with energy, trading previous influences like shoegaze and Pacific Northwest indie rock for danceable '80s synth-pop."

In September 2024, Pitchfork included "Be Sweet" on its list of "The 100 Best Songs of the 2020s So Far", ranking it at number 85.

In October 2026, Rolling Stone included "Be Sweet" on its list of "The 200 Greatest Rock Songs of the 21st Century So Far", ranking it at number 97.

== Live performances ==
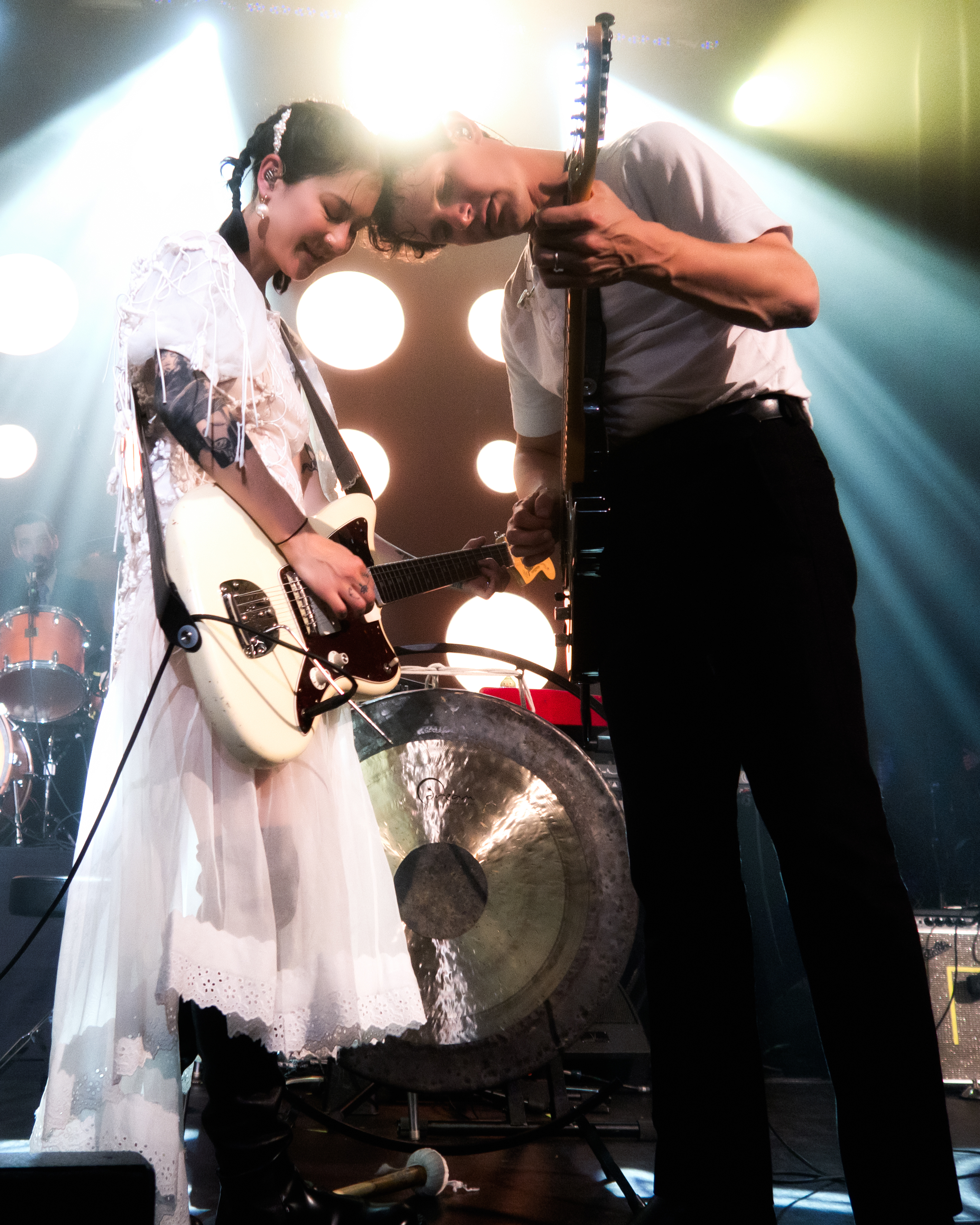
Japanese Breakfast performing in Seattle in September 2021

Japanese Breakfast performed "Be Sweet" on The Tonight Show Starring Jimmy Fallon in March 2021, shortly after the single's release. The performance was filmed at the National Sawdust in Brooklyn, New York City. The band also performed "Jimmy Fallon Big!" from Soft Sounds, with Fallon himself explaining the song's background prior to the bonus performance. The performance of "Be Sweet" on The Tonight Show received a Libera Awards nomination for Best Live/Livestream Act.

Coinciding with the album's release in June 2021, the band performed "Be Sweet", as well as "Kokomo, IN" and "Tactics" on CBS This Morning's "Saturday Sessions" segment. The band continued to perform the song on television in 2022; in January, they performed it on The Ellen DeGeneres Show. April saw the band perform the song on The Kelly Clarkson Show. Later that May, as musical guests for the season 47 finale of Saturday Night Live, the band performed "Be Sweet" and "Paprika". Stephen Thompson from NPR ranked Japanese Breakfast number 11 out of the 21 musical guest performances (Note: Thompson includes one week where there was no musical guest ranked at 19th.) during the season.

The band also performed the song during their Jubilee Tour, which began on August 7, 2021, and continued through 2022. They performed at the Pitchfork Music Festival in July 2022, with a "Be Sweet Lager" beer made available at the festival. The persimmon-flavored beer was made in collaboration with Goose Island; persimmons served as the main visual motif for Jubilee and featured prominently on the album's cover art. The beer's proceeds benefited Heart of Dinner, an organization that aims to combat food insecurity within New York's elderly Asian American community.

For their August 6, 2022 performance Pentaport Rock Festival in Incheon, South Korea, the band performed a Korean-language cover version of the song with vocals from So!YoON! of Se So Neon. Their October performance at the Hackney Church venue in London was given a lukewarm review by Shaad D'Souza of The Guardian, although D'Souza specified "Be Sweet" as one of the songs to "fare better" during the performance.

== Cover and alternate versions ==
In June 2021, the band released a Simlish version during the rollout of Cottage Living, an expansion pack for The Sims 4. In October, Japanese Breakfast released Live at Electric Lady, an eight-track live EP. Recorded at Electric Lady Studios, the EP featured a live version of "Be Sweet". The following March, the band released a "Spotify Singles" version of the song. This version included a "disco beat and call-and-response vocals." In preparation for the band's live performance in South Korea, a Korean-language version was released on July 20, 2022. Zauner received help from Yaeji on the translation over a year prior. So!YoON! of Se So Neon provided the vocals for the cover, with Zauner calling her one of her favorite indie artists in Seoul.

== Music videos ==
"Be Sweet" was released accompanied by a music video starring Zauner and Missy of Mannequin Pussy. Directed by Zauner, the video features the two as X-Files-inspired agents investigating the paranormal. The Simlish cover version released a music video, featuring Zauner singing to a herd of cows while dressed in gingham and a big sunhat. A music video was also released for the Korean version. Animated by Mary Vertulfo, it featured a "stylish, neon-lit [visualizer of Zauner and So!YoOn!] driving".

== Charts ==
=== Weekly charts ===
Weekly chart performance for "Be Sweet"
Chart (2021)	Peak position
ERROR in "Flanders": Invalid position: (Note: "Be Sweet" did not enter the Ultratop 50 chart, but spent four weeks as an extra tip on the Ultratip Bubbling Under chart.). Expected number 1–200 or dash (–).
Iceland (RÚV)	4
US Rock & Alternative Airplay (Billboard)	38

=== Year-end charts ===
Year-end chart performance for "Be Sweet"
Chart (2021)	Peak position
US Adult Alternative Airplay (Billboard)	6

== Certifications ==
Certifications for "Be Sweet"
Region	Certification	Certified units/sales
United States (RIAA)	Gold	500,000^{‡}
^{‡} Sales+streaming figures based on certification alone.
