= For Melancholy Brunettes (& Sad Women) =

Studio album by Japanese Breakfast
- Released: March 21, 2025
- Studio: Sound City (Los Angeles)
- Genres: Indie pop; indie rock
- Length: 32:17
- Label: Dead Oceans
- Producer: Blake Mills

Japanese Breakfast chronology
Sable (Original Video Game Soundtrack) (2021)	For Melancholy Brunettes (& Sad Women) (2025)

Singles from For Melancholy Brunettes (& Sad Women)
- 1. "Orlando in Love" Released: January 7, 2025; 2. "Mega Circuit" Released: February 13, 2025

For Melancholy Brunettes (& Sad Women) is the fourth studio album by American indie pop band Japanese Breakfast. The album was produced by Blake Mills and released on March 21, 2025, through Dead Oceans. Two singles, "Orlando in Love" and "Mega Circuit”, were released earlier in the year.

== Background and recording ==
The album is the band's follow-up to 2021's Grammy-nominated Jubilee, which explored happier feelings than its first two albums. The songs, by lead singer Michelle Zauner, are said to return to darker, "gothic-gloomy" melancholy inspired by the "psychic state of poets on the verge of inspiration".

Recorded at Sound City Studios in Los Angeles, the album is the band's first recorded in a professional studio setting, instead of in-home studios and other improvised locations. Zauner worked with producer Blake Mills, best known for his works with Bob Dylan and Fiona Apple.

== Writing and composition ==
The album's title, Melancholy Brunettes (& Sad Women), is taken from the track, "Orlando In Love", with Michelle Zauner noting: "I was reading a book of short stories called The World of Apples by John Cheever, and there’s a short story in that book about a man who’s unhappy in his marriage and is fantasizing about all the different women he wants to sleep with, and some of them are melancholy brunettes and some are sad women. I just thought that combination of words was quite funny, and sort of filed it away and ended up using it in the song "Orlando In Love". I found it to be sort of romantic and tongue-in-cheek, and it had 'melancholy' in the title which I think is really the kind of thematic throughline through the album. I like semi-obnoxious, divisive titles. Like Fiona Apple’s When the Pawn... and the Smashing Pumpkins’ Mellon Collie And The Infinite Sadness. I kind of felt like I shared similar themes with that album. But yeah, it seems to be quite divisive in ways that I think I anticipated a bit, but is also misunderstood in annoying ways."

== Release ==
The album was announced on January 7, 2025. That same day, Zauner released the lead single, "Orlando in Love", which deals with "desire and its perils". The second single, "Mega Circuit", was released on February 13, 2025. The full album was released on March 21, 2025, through Dead Oceans.

The band announced the Melancholy Tour in support of For Melancholy Brunettes (& Sad Women) from April to September 2025.

== Critical reception ==
Professional ratings
Aggregate scores
Source	Rating
AnyDecentMusic?	8.1/10
Metacritic	84/100
Review scores
Source	Rating
AllMusic	4.5/5 stars
Clash	8/10
DIY	5/5 stars
The Line of Best Fit	8/10
NME	5/5 stars
The Observer	3/5 stars
Paste	9/10
Pitchfork	7.7/10
Rolling Stone	4/5 stars
Under the Radar	9/10

At Metacritic, which assigns a weighted average rating out of 100 to reviews from mainstream critics, For Melancholy Brunettes (& Sad Women) received a rating of 84 out of 100 based on twenty critic reviews, indicating "universal acclaim". AnyDecentMusic? gave the album an average rating of 8.1/10 based on 22 reviews. In a five-star review for the NME, Cordelia Lam praised Zauner's songwriting as "deliciously nuanced", and remarking the album "sounds like living inside a classical piece of art" with "every detail an elaborate brushstroke". Other five-star reviews were published by DIY and Dork. Millie Temperton of DIY applauded the record for being both "a leap in musical maturity" and a "callback to vintage Japanese Breakfast", summarizing the release as "a beautiful literary ode to our complex relationships with lovers, ourselves, and the toll they may take on us".

Matt Collar of AllMusic remarked that the "poetic" and "finely rendered" album "conjures a transcendent pop majesty" which results in a "darkly intoxicating contrast to the bright pop of Jubilee. Paste writer Clare Martin opined that few records are "as evidently poetic and carefully crafted" as For Melancholy Brunettes, and that the album, like the band's previous Soft Sounds from Another Planet (2017), is one that "you don't so much listen to as immerse yourself in it, letting it wash over you and bathe you in its brilliance". Austin Saalman of Under the Radar noted the record as a "remarkably enchanting and utterly intoxicating 'comedown' record" after the breakthrough success of Jubilee and Zauner's memoir Crying in H Mart. Saalman placed the album among other "pivotal fourth albums released in the spectacular wake of major, career-defining masterpieces", such as Radiohead's Kid A (2000), Björk's Vespertine (2001), Bruce Springsteen's Darkness on the Edge of Town (1978) and The Smashing Pumpkins' Adore (1998). Pitchfork writer Aimee Cliff lamented the album's short length, finding its "heart-bursting ambition" to "leave you wishing for more to sink your teeth into"; she summarized the album as "winkingly adventurous".

Some reviewers felt the more subdued music did a disservice to the album's lyrics and themes. Tanatat Khuttapan of The Line of Best Fit found the album lyrically strong but somewhat lacking in musical force, praising the writing as "evocative and complex" while finding the music to be "beautifully composed" yet not as "forceful" as the subject matter. The Observer's Kitty Empire found that the record contained some of Zauner's "best writing", but that its "sharp" lines were done a disservice by the music's "wistful arrangements" and "mellow prettiness". Helen Brown of The Independent remarked that "the music doesn't possess the umami flavours of [Zauner's] prose", opining that the record can "float by like Portland coffee shop background noise" despite the "terrific" storytelling.

For Melancholy Brunettes (& Sad Women) appeared on several year-end lists of the best albums of 2025. It was ranked at number 12 by Under the Radar, while appearing in the top 40 of lists by BPM,, Dork and Flood Magazine, and in the top 50 by Rolling Stone and Slant.

== Track listing ==
All tracks are written by Michelle Zauner.

For Melancholy Brunettes (& Sad Women)
No.	Title	Length
1.	"Here Is Someone"	3:08
2.	"Orlando in Love"	2:25
3.	"Honey Water"	4:50
4.	"Mega Circuit"	3:04
5.	"Little Girl"	3:40
6.	"Leda"	3:18
7.	"Picture Window"	2:58
8.	"Men in Bars" (featuring Jeff Bridges)	2:48
9.	"Winter in LA"	2:58
10.	"Magic Mountain"	3:08
Total length:		32:17

== Personnel ==
- Michelle Zauner – vocals (all tracks), synthesizer (tracks 1, 6, 8); gamelan, mandolin (1); guitar (2–5, 7, 10), arrangement (2), piano (3–5), castanets (9)
- Blake Mills – production, mixing, engineering, guitar (all tracks); percussion (tracks 1–6, 9), synthesizer (1–3, 5–10), piano (1, 4, 5, 10); gamelan, recorder (1); bass (3, 4, 7, 9); mandolin, organ (3)
- Joseph Lorge – mixing, engineering
- Patricia Sullivan – mastering
- Sebastian Reunert – engineering
- Adam Schatz – saxophone (tracks 1, 3, 9)
- Dory Bavarsky – Wurlitzer (tracks 1, 9), piano (8, 9)
- Alam Khan – guitar (track 1)
- Joseph Lorge – organ (track 1)
- Karl McComas-Reichl – bass (tracks 2, 6, 8), cello (2, 9, 10)
- Lauren Baba – viola, violin (tracks 2, 9)
- Matt Chamberlain – drums (tracks 3, 7)
- Jim Keltner – drums (track 4)
- Craig Hendrix – cymbals, percussion (track 7); drums (8, 9)
- Jeff Bridges – vocals (track 8)

== Charts ==
Chart performance for For Melancholy Brunettes (& Sad Women)
Chart (2025)	Peak position
Scottish Albums (Official Charts)	6
UK Albums (Official Charts)	79
UK Americana Albums (Official Charts)	1
UK Independent Albums (Official Charts)	5
US Billboard 200	46
US Independent Albums (Billboard)	8
US Top Rock & Alternative Albums (Billboard)	8
