= Crying in H Mart =

2021 memoir by Michelle Zauner

Crying in H Mart: A Memoir
- First edition cover
- Author: Michelle Zauner
- Audio read by: Michelle Zauner
- Cover artist: Na Kim
- Language: English
- Subject: Memoir
- Publisher: Alfred A. Knopf
- Publication date: April 20, 2021
- Publication place: United States
- Media type: Print (hardcover and paperback), e-book, audiobook
- Pages: 256
- ISBN: 978-0-525-65774-3 (First edition hardcover)
- OCLC: 1162194386
- Dewey Decimal: 782.42166092 B
- LC Class: ML420.Z3913 A3 2021

Crying in H Mart: A Memoir is a 2021 memoir by Michelle Zauner, singer and guitarist of the band Japanese Breakfast. It is her debut book, published on April 20, 2021, by Alfred A. Knopf. It is an expansion of Zauner's essay of the same name which was published in The New Yorker on August 20, 2018. The title mentions H Mart, a North American supermarket chain that specializes in Korean and other Asian products.

The memoir received critical acclaim and became a major bestseller.

== Background ==
After Zauner's mother Chongmi died of pancreatic cancer in October 2014, Zauner frequently made trips to H Mart, an experience she chronicled in her New Yorker essay and in "Real Life: Love, Loss and Kimchi" which won Glamour Magazine's 11th essay contest.

Zauner has said that she decided to write a book-length memoir after literary agents contacted her following the publication of her New Yorker essay. In February 2019, American publishing house Alfred A. Knopf announced that it had won the rights to the book at auction.

== Summary ==
The book begins with the titular essay in which Zauner talks about buying ingredients for Korean cuisine at H Mart. Zauner reminisces about her mother, Chongmi, calling her strict but loving. Zauner writes that she wanted more family approval yet frequently disobeyed her parents and was considered rebellious.

Every two years, Zauner and Chongmi travel to Seoul to visit their family. When Zauner is 14, her maternal grandmother dies, leaving Zauner haunted by her last words.

During high school, Zauner falls into depression, resulting in truancy. Chongmi allows her to sleep once a week at her best friend's house, where she begins to admire her friend's mother, engendering Chongmi's jealousy and straining their relationship. Zauner is inspired to learn guitar after watching a DVD of the Yeah Yeah Yeahs and Karen O, who is also of Korean American heritage. Zauner begins to write songs and perform in public, including opening for Maria Taylor at the W.O.W. Hall. Zauner applies to liberal arts universities for women and attends Bryn Mawr College in Pennsylvania, to Chongmi's disappointment.

In 2014, Zauner graduates from college with a creative writing degree and leads a band named Little Big League. However, the band struggles to find commercial success. That summer, Zauner learns that Chongmi has cancer and flies to Eugene to care for her. Soon after Chongmi returns home, her friend Kye arrives and begins to take care of her.

In August, Zauner returns to Philadelphia to tour with Little Big League. After the tour, her father Joel reveals that Chongmi's condition is worsening. The three fly to Seoul as per Chongmi's wishes but she is hospitalized upon arrival. After Chongmi recovers, Zauner and Joel transfer her to Riverbend Hospital in Eugene.

Wanting her mother to attend her wedding, Zauner proposes marriage to her boyfriend Peter, who accepts. Soon after, Zauner and Peter get married with their families and friends attending. After the wedding, Kye leaves after being irritated by Joel. Soon after, Chongmi's condition declines drastically and she dies on October 18, 2014. Joel, Zauner, and Peter host a funeral the next week. Joel and Zauner fly to Vietnam, hoping to soothe their grief but the trip only strains their relationship.

After moving to Brooklyn with Peter, Zauner begins learning to cook Korean cuisine and records music to cope with her grief. She begins working at an advertising firm in New York City, deciding that she will soon quit recording music due to her lack of success.

Zauner submits an album to Yellow K Records as Japanese Breakfast, titling it Psychopomp. Its reception exceeds Zauner's expectations and Japanese Breakfast signs with the record label Dead Oceans. The band tours to promote the album and Zauner quits her advertising job.

During the band's last tour date in Asia, Zauner's maternal aunt Nami and her husband, whom Zauner nicknamed "Boo", are in attendance. After the concert ends, Zauner and Peter spend time with Nami and Boo. On the night before they depart, Zauner and Peter accompany Nami and Boo to a karaoke bar where Nami asks Zauner to sing "Coffee Hanjan". As the lyrics begin, Zauner hopes that her heritage will help her sing the words.

== Reception ==
=== Sales ===
Crying in H Mart debuted as the seventh-best-selling hardcover nonfiction book for the week ending April 24, 2021, according to Publishers Weekly and The Wall Street Journal, which use data from NPD BookScan.

It debuted at number two on The New York Times best-seller list for combined print and e-book nonfiction for the week ending April 24, 2021, and ultimately spent 55 weeks on the list. It also spent 67 weeks on the Times' hardcover nonfiction best-seller list.

A paperback edition was published by Vintage Books on March 28, 2023. The book topped the Times's paperback nonfiction category for the week ending April 8, 2023, and remained on the list for 43 weeks.

=== Critical response ===
Publishers Weekly wrote, "The prose is lyrical if at times overwrought, but Zauner does a good job capturing the grief of losing a parent with pathos."

Kristen Martin of NPR called the book a "rare acknowledgement of the ravages of cancer in a culture obsessed with seeing it as an enemy that can be battled with hope and strength."

In The Atlantic, food writer Mayukh Sen wrote, "As lovely as Zauner's indulgent sketches of meals are, they slow her momentum...But agile writers know how to mine food for emotional truth, and Zauner finds her footing as Crying in H Mart progresses. Near the end, she connects food to her own unmooring."

In a starred review, Kirkus Reviews called the memoir "a tender, well-rendered, heart-wrenching account of the way food ties us to those who have passed."

The book received the 2021 Goodreads Choice Award for Memoir & Autobiography. It was also named a top book of the year by numerous publications, including Time, The Atlantic and Entertainment Weekly. In September 2022, Zauner was announced as one of the winners of the 43rd annual American Book Awards.

== Film adaptation ==
On June 7, 2021, it was announced that Crying in H Mart: A Memoir would be adapted as a feature film by Orion Pictures. Zauner will adapt the film and provide the film's soundtrack, as Japanese Breakfast. In May 2022, Zauner announced that she had finished the first draft of the screenplay.

Will Sharpe was announced as the director of the film adaptation in March 2023.

In January 2025, Zauner announced that the film was "on pause". She explained: "There were issues with the Hollywood strikes, and the director stepped away from the project. I spent a year working on the screenplay, which was a tough but rewarding process. I still have faith it will get made someday, but it's not happening anytime soon. Right now, I'm focusing on other creative projects, so the film will have to wait."
