= Live at Electric Lady =

Live at Electric Lady may refer to:

- Live at Electric Lady, a 2023 live album by Denzel Curry
- Live at Electric Lady, a 2023 live album by Clairo
- Live at Electric Lady, a 2020 live album by The Raconteurs
- Live at Electric Lady, a 2021 live album by Japanese Breakfast
- Live at Electric Lady, a 2021 live album by Bleachers
- Live at Electric Lady, a 2022 live album by Father John Misty
