= Michelle Zauner =

American musician and author (born 1989)

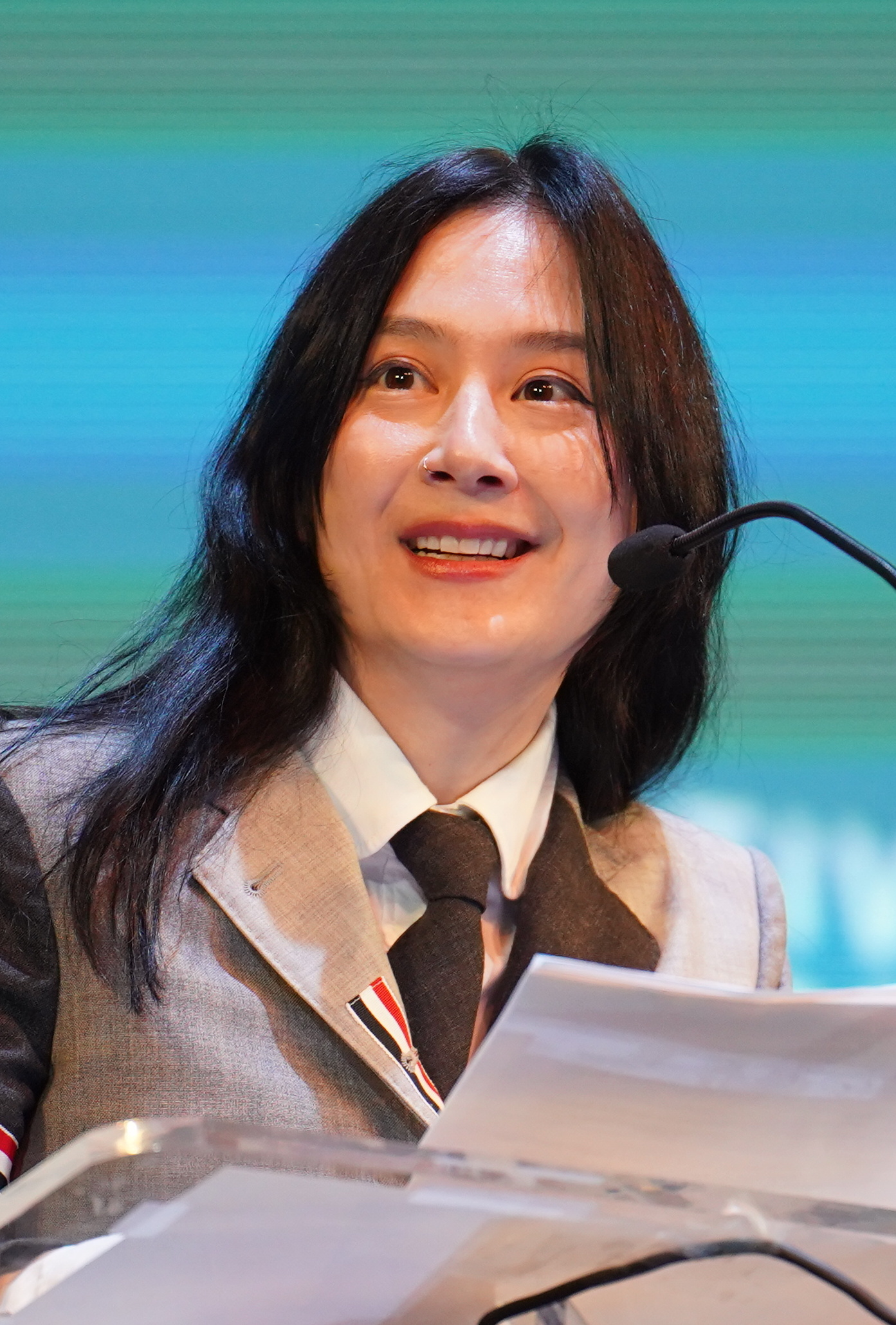
- Zauner at the National Book Awards finalist reading in 2025
- Born: Michelle Chongmi Zauner; March 29, 1989 (age 37); Seoul, South Korea
- Citizenship: United States
- Education: Bryn Mawr College
- Occupations: Musician; singer; songwriter; author
- Years active: 2005–present
- Spouse: Peter Bradley (m. 2014)
- Children: 1
- Musical career
- Origin: Eugene, Oregon, U.S.
- Genres: Indie pop; indie rock; dream pop; shoegaze; chamber pop; experimental pop; lo-fi
- Instruments: Vocals; guitar; keyboards; bass; percussion
- Labels: Dead Oceans; Yellow K; W Hotels
- Member of: Japanese Breakfast
- Formerly of: Little Big League; Bumper; Birthday Girlz; Little Girl, Big Spoon; Post Post; Dog Island

Michelle Chongmi Zauner (born March 29, 1989) is an American musician, singer, songwriter, and author, known as the lead vocalist of the indie pop band Japanese Breakfast. Her 2021 memoir, Crying in H Mart, spent 60 weeks on The New York Times hardcover non-fiction bestseller list. In 2022, Time named her one of the 100 most influential people in the world under the category Innovators on their annual list.

Zauner has performed music since her youth and was a member of the Philadelphia-based emo band Little Big League, with whom she released two albums, These Are Good People (2013) and Tropical Jinx (2014). In 2013, Zauner began to release music under the name Japanese Breakfast, and has released four studio albums to date: Psychopomp in 2016, Soft Sounds from Another Planet in 2017, Jubilee in 2021, and For Melancholy Brunettes (& sad women) in 2025. Also as Japanese Breakfast, Zauner wrote the soundtrack for the 2021 video game Sable. Zauner's essays have been published in Glamour, The New Yorker, and Harper's Bazaar.

== Life and career ==
=== 1989–2011: Early life and projects ===
Michelle Chongmi Zauner was born on March 29, 1989, in Seoul, South Korea, to Chongmi, a housewife, and Joel Zauner, a car salesman. Her mother was Korean and her father is American of Jewish heritage. In the memoir, she writes "Growing up in America with a Caucasian father and Korean mother, I relied on my mom for access to our Korean heritage."

Zauner was raised in the university town of Eugene, Oregon, United States where the family moved when she was nine months old.

Growing up, Zauner and her mother visited their family in Seoul most summers.

At fifteen, Zauner asked her mother to buy a guitar. She began taking weekly guitar lessons at The Lesson Factory, learning chords, and writing songs. Her first songs were about "friendships and their fallouts." She began playing at local open mic nights and at performance venues around Eugene under the name Little Girl, Big Spoon, much to the chagrin of her mother, who hoped that her daughter would not pursue a career in music. As Little Girl, Big Spoon, Zauner self-released a CD entitled Boats to Boxes. She began advertising her music around Eugene and frequently played at the W.O.W. Hall as an opening act for singers such as Mike Coykendall, M. Ward, and Maria Taylor. Zauner also played at school benefits. Her musical activities strained her relationship with her mother, which caused Zauner to become depressed during senior year at South Eugene High School.

Zauner attended Bryn Mawr College in Pennsylvania, where she created an independent major in creative production and became fond of authors such as Philip Roth, Richard Ford, and John Updike. She preferred to write fiction to avoid writing about her mixed-race identity as a Korean-American, believing that if she did, she would be playing the "race card". In the fall of 2008, Zauner joined fellow Bryn Mawr students Marisa Helgeson, Casey Sowa, and Riki Gifford-Ferguson to form Post Post, an indie pop band that rehearsed in Helgeson's dorm. Post Post released an EP, Meta Meta, on September 4, 2009, through the label Awkwardcore Records. Zauner also played in a band called Birthday Girlz; the band released one album, Bear Country, around 2009. She graduated from Bryn Mawr in 2011, then waited tables and worked at Philadelphia music venue Union Transfer's coat check while trying to get her music career off the ground.

=== 2011–2016: Little Big League and Japanese Breakfast ===
In 2011, Zauner started the Philadelphia emo band Little Big League with Ian Dykstra, Kevin O'Halloran, and Deven Craige. O'Halloran and Zauner met in classes at Bryn Mawr; the two met Craige at a Post Post show and Dykstra at a party. On April 1, 2012, the band released an eponymous EP. Fronted by Zauner, it recorded music for its debut studio album in Craige's studio, at Berk's Warehouse in Philadelphia, wrapping in January 2013. The album was released on the Tiny Engines label as These Are Good People on August 6, 2013, and the band launched a tour. These Are Good People spawned the single "My Very Own You".

In 2013, Zauner began recording songs that she released under the name Japanese Breakfast. She has said she picked the name after seeing a gif of Japanese breakfast, because she thought that Americans consider it to be "exotic." In June 2013, Zauner and musician Rachel Gagliardi of the duo Slutever recorded and posted one song a day on the Tumblr blog rachelandmichelledojune. On July 1, she released the songs on Bandcamp as the album June. As Japanese Breakfast, Zauner also participated in a song project with musicians Eskimeaux, Florist, Frankie Cosmos, and Small Wonder, who posted songs daily on the Tumblr blog may5to12songs in May 2014. On June 6, 2014, she released her songs as the Japanese Breakfast album Where Is My Great Big Feeling? on Bandcamp. On July 24, she released another album, American Sound. She rereleased both in late July on cassette tape as American Sound/Where Is My Great Big Feeling?.

Also in July 2014, Little Big League and rock band Ovlov co-released an EP, Split, on the Tiny Engines label. Later that year, they signed with Run for Cover, which released the band's second and final album, Tropical Jinx, in October. To promote the album, the band toured alongside Ovlov and punk-rock band Mannequin Pussy, including a concert at Shea Stadium, a Brooklyn DIY venue. Zauner left the band to return to Eugene to care for her mother, who had been diagnosed with stage IV squamous cell carcinoma.

In 2015, dismayed by her lack of success in the music industry, Zauner took a job at an advertising firm in New York City. During her free time, she recorded songs about her mother's death as a way to cope with her grief.

In January 2016, Zauner formed the band Dog Island with Alanna Nuala Higgins from the band Moon and Kat Casale, former drummer for Japanese American singer-songwriter Mitski. They played several shows at the Brooklyn venues Silent Barn, David Blaine's The Steakhouse, and Market Hotel, where they opened for DIIV in March 2016. The band released no music; Zauner mainly focused on recording with Japanese Breakfast. In February, Little Big League reunited after a two-year hiatus to play alongside Ovlov on February 19 and the Loved Ones and Cayetana on February 20.

=== 2016–2023: Japanese Breakfast and Crying in H Mart ===
On April 1, 2016, Japanese Breakfast released its debut studio album, Psychopomp. Zauner had decided to quit music and not tour after releasing the album, but changed her mind after it received critical praise and more attention than she expected. Japanese Breakfast subsequently opened for Mitski alongside American musician Jay Som. On June 23, 2016, Dead Oceans announced that it had signed Japanese Breakfast, which made its live international debut that August in the United Kingdom.

On July 13, 2016, Zauner won the 11th edition of the Glamour magazine essay contest with "Real Life: Love, Loss, and Kimchi", which discussed her mother's cancer diagnosis and death and the bond they shared over Korean food. Zauner said the essay was "largely about cooking along with" Korean-born American YouTuber Maangchi's cooking tutorials.

On July 13, 2017, Japanese Breakfast released its second studio album, Soft Sounds from Another Planet. The album received critical acclaim and was the band's first album to chart, reaching the Billboard Top Heatseekers, US Independent Albums, New Zealand Heatseekers Chart, and the UK Indie Chart.

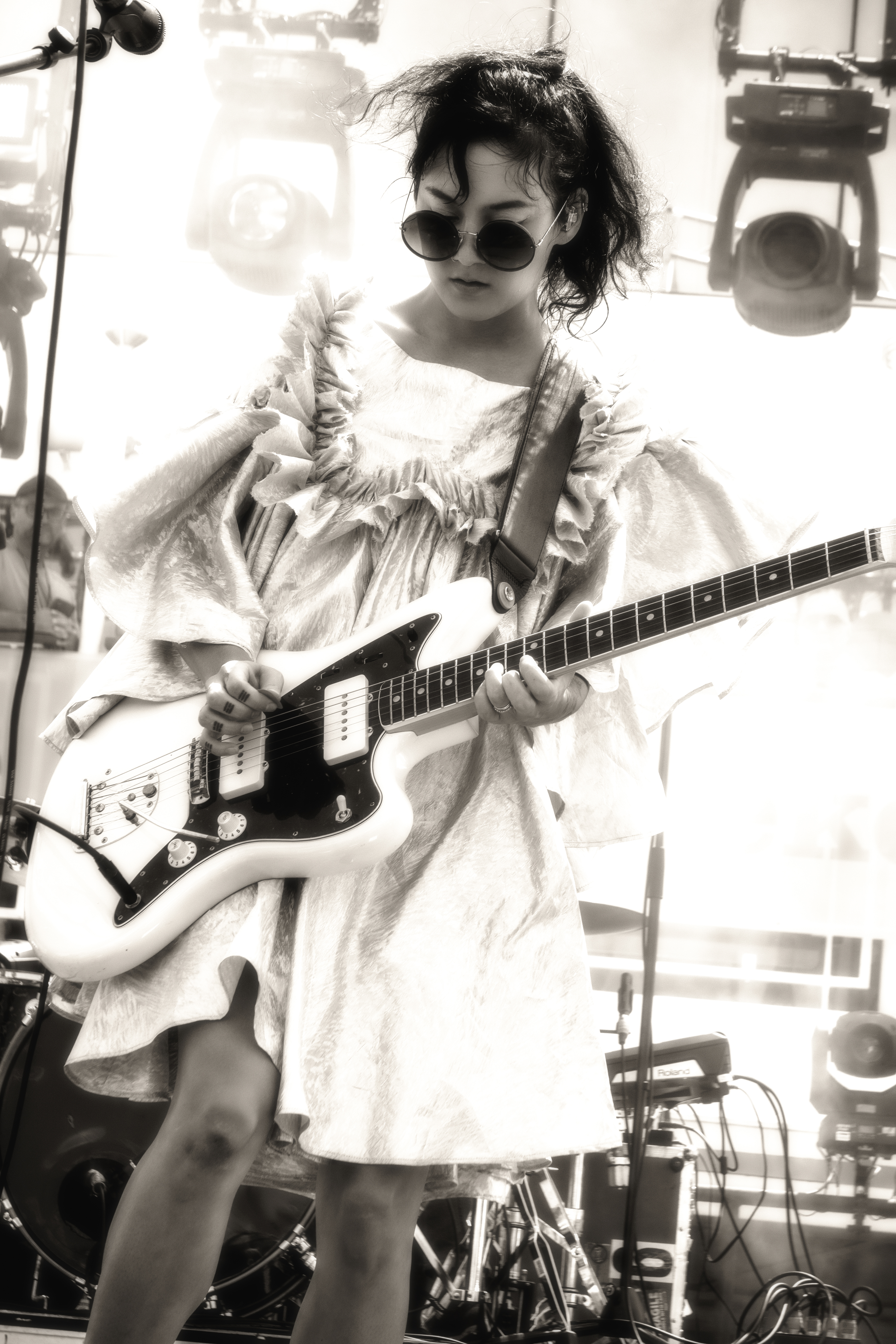
Zauner performs live at the Boaty Weekender in 2019.

On August 20, 2018, The New Yorker published Zauner's essay, "Crying in H Mart", which describes her experiences shopping at H Mart, a Korean-focused grocery store. She was subsequently contacted by literary agents and publishing houses, which convinced her to write a book-length memoir. On February 28, 2019, American publishing house Alfred A. Knopf announced that it had acquired the rights to her memoir in an auction.

Later in 2019, Zauner hosted a five-episode Munchies series, "Close to Home", that explored the effects of immigration on various cultures' cuisine and experiences "tied into intermingling food cultures." The series featured Maangchi and other guests.

In 2020, Zauner formed Bumper with Ryan Galloway of the band Crying. Galloway had earlier contributed a guitar part for a song, "Slide Tackle", that eventually appeared on Japanese Breakfast's studio album Jubilee (2021). As Bumper, the duo recorded songs remotely during the COVID-19 lockdowns. On September 3, 2020, Bumper released an EP, pop songs 2020, to positive reviews.

On April 1, 2021, Harper's Bazaar published Zauner's essay, "#Forgiveness," which discussed her estrangement from her father after her mother's death. On April 20, 2021, Knopf released Zauner's debut book, Crying In H Mart: A Memoir. The book's first chapter is essentially her New Yorker essay. The memoir received critical acclaim and debuted at number two on the New York Times's nonfiction bestseller list; it would ultimately spend 60 weeks on the list from July 2021 to September 2022. On June 7, 2021, Orion Pictures announced that it would adapt Crying In H Mart into a feature film and pay Zauner to write the film's screenplay and supervise its soundtrack. In April 2022, Zauner said she had finished the first draft of the screenplay. On March 20, 2023, Zauner said the film would be directed by Will Sharpe.

On June 4, 2021, Japanese Breakfast released its third studio album, Jubilee. Zauner directed the video for the single "Be Sweet". The album was nominated for Best Alternative Music Album at the 64th annual Grammy Awards. The album received widespread critical acclaim and was the band's first to make the Billboard 200 list; it peaked at 56.

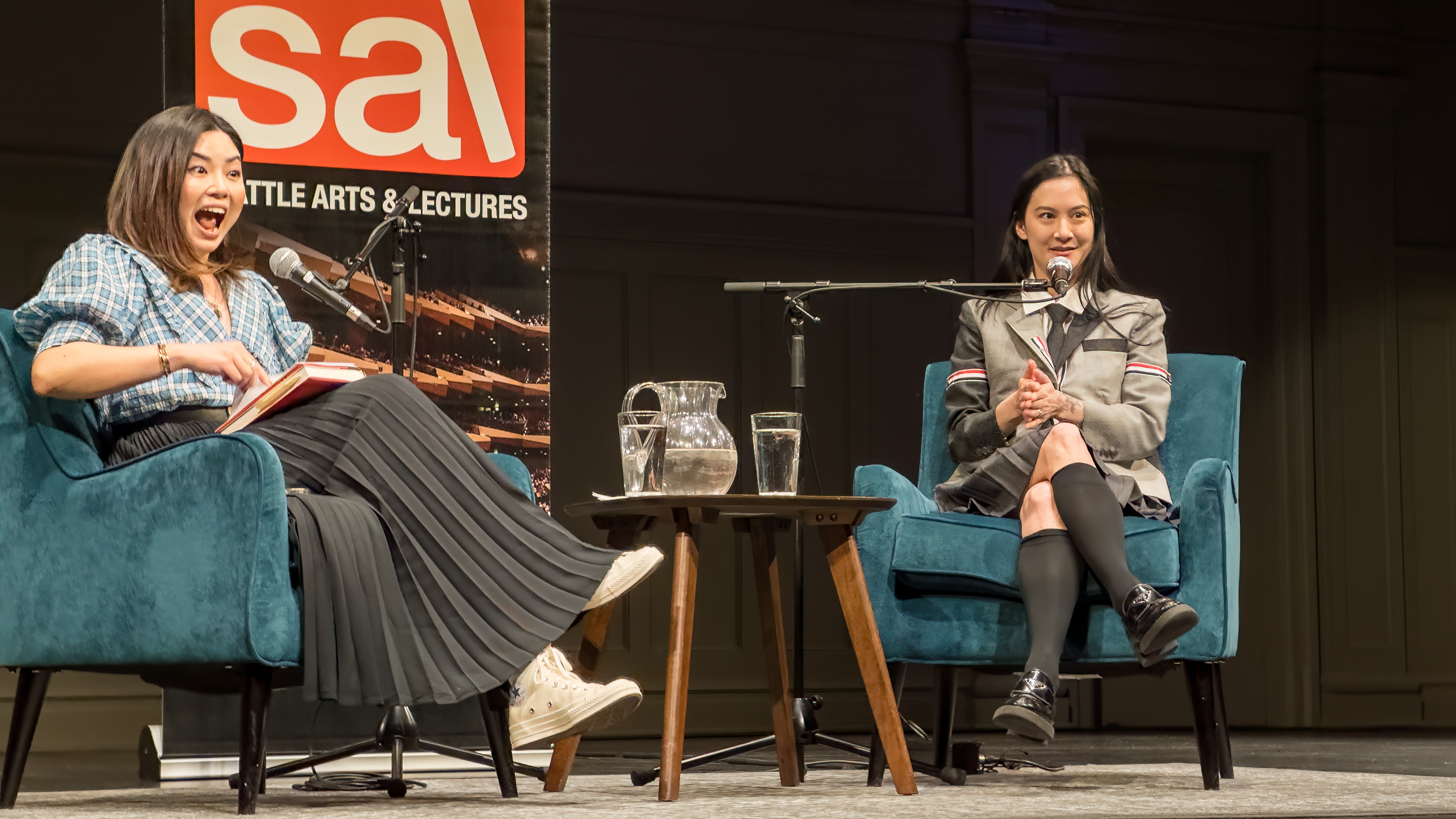
Jane Park interviews Michelle Zauner for Seattle Arts and Lectures in 2023.

In 2023, Zauner said she planned to move to Seoul in December to work on a new album and her second book, which is to document her experience in learning Korean for a year.

=== 2024: South Korea ===
Around January 2024, she began studying Korean at Sogang University's Korean Language Education Center in Seoul. That June, she gave a talk at the Seoul International Book Fair and performed at the Asian Pop Festival in Incheon with Min-hwi Lee and Lang Lee. In August, she said she was writing and recording music for a fourth Japanese Breakfast album that would feature "gloomy topics" and more of her guitar work.

The album, For Melancholy Brunettes (& sad women), was recorded at Sound City Studios in Los Angeles, produced by Blake Mills, and was released by Dead Oceans on March 21, 2025.

In January 2025, Zauner announced that the Crying in H Mart film was "on pause", saying: "There were issues with the Hollywood strikes, and the director stepped away from the project. I spent a year working on the screenplay, which was a tough but rewarding process. I still have faith it will get made someday, but it's not happening anytime soon. Right now, I'm focusing on other creative projects, so the film will have to wait."

Zauner authored a memoir on her time in South Korea, titled Thank You For Your Suffering, which is scheduled to release on April 27th, 2027.

== Artistry ==
=== Influences ===
2022 photo of Karen O, lead singer of Yeah Yeah Yeahs, who Zauner said made music "more accessible"

Zauner grew up listening to Motown music, girl groups, and British-American rock band Fleetwood Mac, which she says inspired her to write pop music that is "interesting and has lyrical depth". The first song she learned to play on the guitar was Built to Spill's "Carry the Zero". Other musical influences include Joe Hisaishi, Frank Ocean, Kate Bush, and video games. She has called the 1975 her "fave band" and contributed uncredited guest vocals to its track "Part of the Band". Zauner has called Björk's discography "perfect" and said that Japanese Breakfast's third studio album Jubilee was inspired by Björk's third studio album, Homogenic (1997). As part of Pitchfork's "My Perfect 10" series, Zauner named Billy Joel's The Stranger as her perfect album.

Zauner decided to be a musician after watching a DVD of American musician Karen O of the Yeah Yeah Yeahs. She said O "rejected the stereotype of meek Asian girls" and "'made music more accessible'" for someone who was like her. Her youth as a Korean-American has also influenced her songwriting.

=== Videos ===
Zauner has directed most of Japanese Breakfast's music videos, except "In Heaven" and "Jane Cum", which were directed by Adam Kolodny, and "Everybody Wants To Love You", which she and Kolodny co-directed. Zauner described the video for the Japanese Breakfast song "Boyish" as her "magnum opus".

Zauner also directed the video for Jay Som's single "The Bus Song", for rock superduo Better Oblivion Community Center's single "Dylan Thomas", and for power pop group Charly Bliss's single "Capacity", in which she gave herself a cameo as a reporter named "Shelley Breakfast", a role she reprised in Japanese Breakfast's video for "Be Sweet".

== Personal life ==
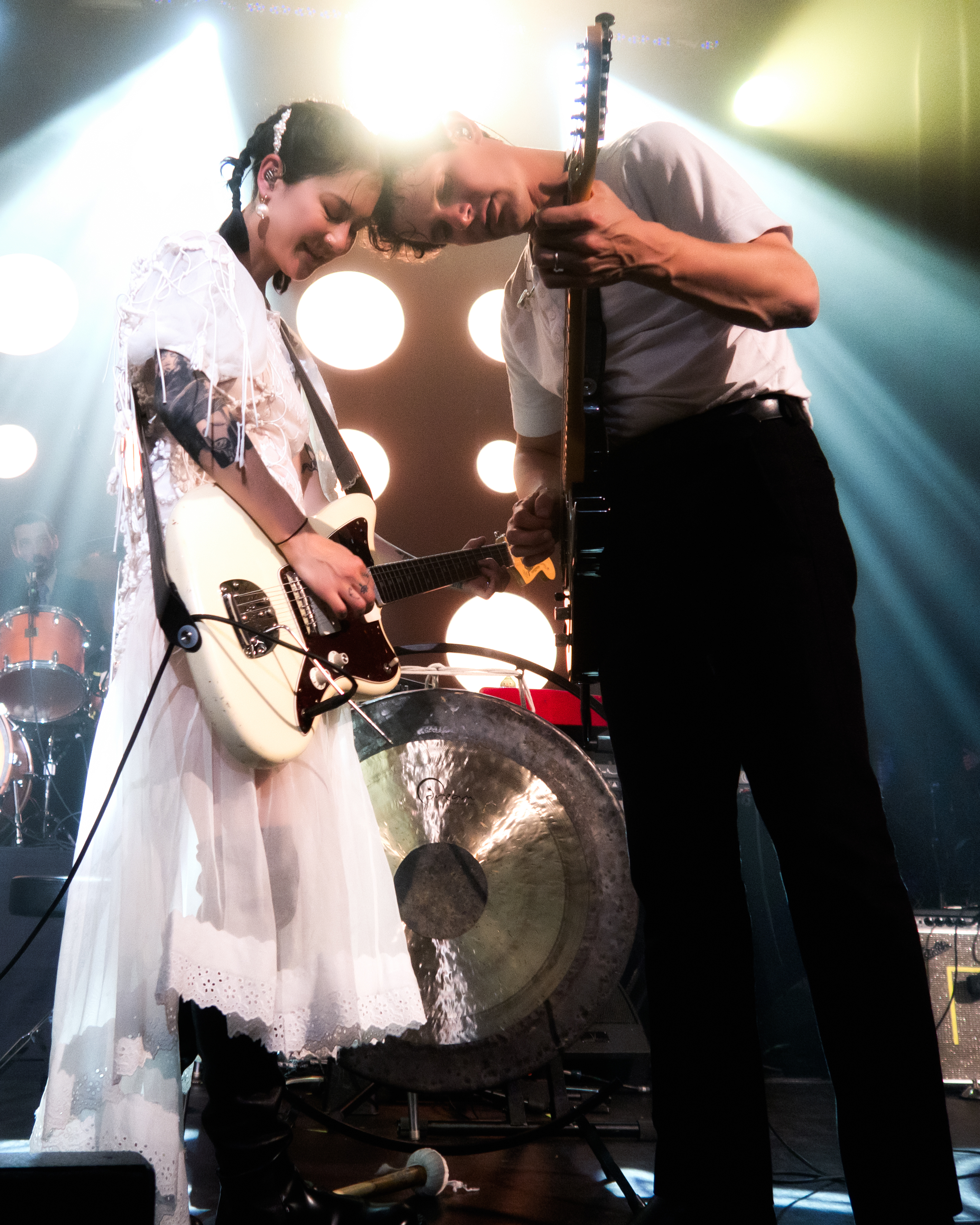
Zauner and her husband Peter Bradley perform live at the Neptune Theatre in Seattle in 2021.

Zauner married her bandmate Peter Bradley in 2014, just two weeks before her mother's death from squamous cell carcinoma of the bile duct. The pair met in 12 Steps Down, a bar in Philadelphia; Zauner has said her song of the same name details their first meeting. She wrote the Japanese Breakfast song "Till Death" as a love song and thank-you note to Bradley. In June 2026, Zauner revealed her pregnancy during her performance at the Governors Ball Music Festival. Later that year, she gave birth to her and Bradley's first child.

Zauner's mother died on October 18, 2014. Zauner has said that her relationship with her mother, and its end, inspired her to collect "evidence that the Korean half" of her identity "did not die" when her mother and aunt did. After her mother died, Zauner began making frequent trips to H Mart, a supermarket that specializes in Korean food, and began learning how to cook the Korean food her mother made during her childhood, a process she chronicled in her essay Crying in H Mart and her book of the same name. She followed cooking tutorials from Maangchi, with whom she became friends. Zauner, who was not fluent in Korean prior to her extended stay in South Korea in 2024, sometimes uses Korean phrases while speaking English.

Zauner is bisexual. She has said that the Japanese Breakfast song "Everybody Wants to Love You" was written about her relationship with a woman.

Zauner has said that she is estranged from her father, who lives in Thailand.

=== Activism ===
Zauner has been an advocate for Asian-American issues. She spoke out on Twitter after the 2021 Atlanta spa shootings, expressing her anger and calling it important to acknowledge anti-Asian racism in the United States.

In 2022, Zauner and Chicago-based Goose Island Brewery released a limited-edition lager at the Pitchfork Music Festival to raise money for the "Heart of Dinner" charity, which helps elderly Asian-Americans struggling with food insecurity. The beer was named "Be Sweet" after her song.

Zauner has said she hopes to inspire more Asian-Americans to be involved in music. Some of her videos, such as the one for "Everybody Wants to Love You", contain references to Korean culture.

In September 2025, Zauner joined the "No Music For Genocide" movement, removing her music from streaming services in Israel in protest of the ongoing Gaza genocide.

== Discography ==
Little Girl, Big Spoon

- Boats to Boxes (2006)

Post Post

- Meta Meta EP (2009)
- Residents EP (2010)

Birthday Girlz

- Bear Country (~2009)

Little Big League

- These Are Good People (2013)
- Tropical Jinx (2014)

Japanese Breakfast

- Psychopomp (2016)
- Soft Sounds from Another Planet (2017)
- Jubilee (2021)
- Sable (Original Video Game Soundtrack) (2021)
- For Melancholy Brunettes (and Sad Women) (2025)

Bumper

- Pop songs 2020 (2020)

== Bibliography ==
- Zauner, Michelle (2021). Crying in H Mart: A Memoir. New York: Alfred A. Knopf. ISBN 978-0-525-65774-3.
- Zauner, Michelle (2027). Thank You for Your Suffering: A Memoir. New York: Alfred A. Knopf. ISBN 978-0-593-53731-2.
