= Soft Sounds from Another Planet =

Studio album by Japanese Breakfast
- Released: July 14, 2017
- Recorded: 2016
- Studio: Japanese Breakfast's studio (Philadelphia)
- Genres: Shoegaze; indie rock; experimental pop
- Length: 37:10
- Label: Dead Oceans
- Producers: Craig Hendrix; Michelle Zauner

Japanese Breakfast chronology
Psychopomp (2016)	Soft Sounds from Another Planet (2017)	Jubilee (2021)

Singles from Soft Sounds from Another Planet
- 1. "Machinist" Released: May 4, 2017; 2. "Boyish" Released: June 7, 2017; 3. "Road Head" Released: July 6, 2017

Soft Sounds from Another Planet is the second studio album by American indie pop band Japanese Breakfast. The album was released by Dead Oceans on July 14, 2017.

Primarily described as an indie rock and shoegaze album, Soft Sounds from Another Planet also incorporates elements of electronic dance music, synth-pop, space pop, electropop, lo-fi, progressive rock, experimental pop and chamber pop. It primarily deals with themes of loss, science fiction and perseverance.

The album received critical acclaim from critics who commended it for its eclectic and experimental production and exploration of grief and love although some believed it to be uneven. The album became Japanese Breakfast's first to chart, reaching the top 20 of the Billboard Heatseekers and Independent charts in the US and the New Zealand Heatseekers Albums chart.

== Background ==
In 2014, Michelle Zauner left the Philadelphia-based emo band Little Big League to care for her terminally ill mother in her hometown of Eugene, Oregon. Songs she wrote to cope with her grief about her mother's death became part of Psychopomp (2016), Japanese Breakfast's debut studio album. Psychopomp received unexpected critical and commercial success, rejuvenating Zauner's efforts to make music a career and leading her to sign with Dead Oceans. However, she found herself "reliving traumatic memories" when giving interviews about the album. Zauner said she began writing Soft Sounds from Another Planet to help leave her trauma behind.

Zauner envisioned it as a concept album, a "sci-fi musical" that would tackle different themes than its predecessor. The first song she wrote for the new album was "Machinist." She found that she disliked the songs she was creating at the time. Zauner also hoped to create a "hi fi" album in contrast to Psychopomp's lo-fi palette that also maintained its predecessor's experimental and playful nature. She attributed the latter to having recently signed to Dead Oceans and consequently feeling pressured due to the budget and deadlines the label assigned her. To produce the album, Zauner contacted Craig Hendrix and the two recorded the album over a month long period in their Philadelphia studio.

== Release and promotion ==
=== Singles ===
On May 4, 2017, Japanese Breakfast released the album's lead single, "Machinist" to positive critical reviews. It debuted alongside a music video depicting a woman who dismantles her spaceship when she tries to build a body for her robot lover. The video was directed by Zauner and Adam Kolodny. A second single, "Boyish", was released on June 7, 2017, followed by its own video on February 13, 2018, which Zauner later described as her "magnum opus". A third and final single, "Road Head", was released on July 6, 2017, alongside another music video directed by Zauner, who drew inspiration from Hong Kong film director Wong Kar-wai's film Fallen Angels and television series Twin Peaks.

=== Video game ===
To promote the album, Japanese Breakfast released a video game, "Japanese BreakQuest". Players guide "J-Brekkie", a character named for the band's Twitter handle, to gather a band and fight an alien invasion. It was developed by Zauner and video game developer Elaine Fath and features songs from the album as 8-bit MIDI tracks by Peter Bradley.

=== Tour ===
Japanese Breakfast toured in support of the album from July 15, 2017, until November 24, 2019. Supporting acts during the tour included American singers Yohuna, Jay Som, and Half Waif; and American bands Mannequin Pussy, The Spirit of the Beehive, LVL UP, Radiator Hospital, Mothers, and Ought.

Soft Sounds from Another Planet Tour
- Tour by Japanese Breakfast
- Associated album: Soft Sounds from Another Planet
- Start date: July 15, 2017
- End date: November 24, 2019
- Legs: 2
- No. of shows: 156
- Supporting acts: Yohuna, Mannequin Pussy, The Spirit of the Beehive, Half Waif, Mothers, Ought

Japanese Breakfast concert chronology
- Porches and Japanese Breakfast Tour (2016); Soft Sounds from Another Planet Tour (2017–19); Jubilee Tour (2021–23)

"Setlist"
1. "Diving Woman"
2. "In Heaven"
3. "The Woman That Loves You"
4. "Road Head"
5. "Heft"
6. "The Body Is A Blade"
7. "Boyish"
8. "Jane Cum"
9. "12 Steps"
10. "This House"
11. "Triple 7"
12. "Till Death"
13. "Everybody Wants To Love You"
14. "Machinist"

Tour dates and venues
Date	City	Country	Venue	Opening Act(s)
North America
July 15, 2017	New York City	United States	Union Pool	Yohuna
September 7, 2017	Washington, D.C.	United States	Black Cat	Mannequin Pussy & The Spirit of the Beehive
September 8, 2017	Richmond	United States	Stranger Matter	Mannequin Pussy & The Spirit of the Beehive
September 9, 2017	Raleigh	United States	Hopscotch Music Festival (Note: This concert was part of the Hopscotch Music Festival)	Mannequin Pussy & The Spirit of the Beehive
September 10, 2017	Atlanta	United States	The Masquerade	Mannequin Pussy & The Spirit of the Beehive
September 11, 2017	Orlando	United States	Will's Pub	Mannequin Pussy & The Spirit of the Beehive
September 12, 2017	Tampa	United States	Crowbar	Mannequin Pussy & The Spirit of the Beehive
September 13, 2017	New Orleans	United States	Hi Ho Lounge	Mannequin Pussy & The Spirit of the Beehive
September 14, 2017	Houston	United States	Walter's	Mannequin Pussy & The Spirit of the Beehive
September 15, 2017	Austin	United States	Barracuda	Mannequin Pussy & The Spirit of the Beehive
September 16, 2017	Dallas	United States	RBC	Mannequin Pussy & The Spirit of the Beehive
September 18, 2017	Phoenix	United States	Valley Bar	Mannequin Pussy & The Spirit of the Beehive
September 20, 2017	Los Angeles	United States	The Echo	Mannequin Pussy & The Spirit of the Beehive
September 21, 2017	San Francisco	United States	Swedish American Hall	Mannequin Pussy & The Spirit of the Beehive
September 22, 2017	Oakland	United States	Starline Social Club	Mannequin Pussy & The Spirit of the Beehive
September 23, 2017	Eugene	United States	HiFi	Mannequin Pussy & The Spirit of the Beehive
September 25, 2017	Portland	United States	Holocene	Mannequin Pussy & The Spirit of the Beehive
September 26, 2017	Vancouver	Canada	Fox Cabaret	Mannequin Pussy & The Spirit of the Beehive
September 27, 2017	Seattle	United States	The Crocodile	Mannequin Pussy & The Spirit of the Beehive
September 28, 2017	Boise	United States	Neurolux	Mannequin Pussy & The Spirit of the Beehive
September 29, 2017	Salt Lake City	United States	Kilby Court	Mannequin Pussy & The Spirit of the Beehive
September 30, 2017	Denver	United States	Larimer Lounge	Mannequin Pussy & The Spirit of the Beehive
October 2, 2017	Minneapolis	United States	The Triple Rock	Mannequin Pussy & The Spirit of the Beehive
October 4, 2017	Chicago	United States	Subterranean	Mannequin Pussy & The Spirit of the Beehive
October 5, 2017	Bloomington	United States	The Bishop	Mannequin Pussy & The Spirit of the Beehive
October 6, 2017	Detroit	United States	UFO Factory	Mannequin Pussy & The Spirit of the Beehive
October 7, 2017	Toronto	Canada	The Garrison	Mannequin Pussy & The Spirit of the Beehive
October 8, 2017	Montreal	Canada	Bar Le Ritz	Mannequin Pussy & The Spirit of the Beehive
October 11, 2017	Cambridge	United States	The Sinclair	Mannequin Pussy & The Spirit of the Beehive
October 12, 2017	New York City	United States	Music Hall of Williamsburg	Mannequin Pussy & The Spirit of the Beehive
Europe
October 21, 2017	Bristol	England	Simple Things Festival	N/A
October 23, 2017	Cologne	Germany	Blue Shell	N/A
October 24, 2017	Hamburg	Germany	Hakken	N/A
October 25, 2017	Berlin	Germany	Badenhouse	N/A
October 26, 2017	Paris	France	Pop Up Du Label	N/A
October 27, 2017	Ghent	Belgium	NEST	N/A
October 28, 2017	Amsterdam	Netherlands	Paradiso (Note: This show was a part of the London Calling festival)	N/A
November 2, 2017	Brighton	England	The Joker	N/A
November 3, 2017	Manchester	England	Soup Kitchen	N/A
November 4, 2017	Edinburgh	Scotland	The Mash House	N/A
November 5, 2017	Glasgow	Scotland	The Hug and Paint	N/A
November 6, 2017	Leeds	England	Headrow House	N/A
November 7, 2017	London	England	The Dome Tufnell Park	N/A
Asia
November 28, 2017	Hong Kong		Music Zone	N/A
November 30, 2017	Taipei	Taiwan	The Wall	N/A
December 1, 2017	Beijing	China	Modern Sky Festival	N/A
December 3, 2017	Shanghai	China	Yuyintang	N/A
December 4, 2017	Bangkok	Thailand	Rockademy	N/A
Oceania
December 8, 2017	Berry	Australia	Fairgrounds Festival	N/A
December 9, 2017	Melbourne	Australia	The John Curtin Hotel	N/A
December 10, 2017	Melbourne	Australia	Supernatural Amphitheatre (Note: This concert was part of the Meredith Festival)	N/A
Asia
December 11, 2017	Tokyo	Japan	Daikanyama Unit	N/A
December 12, 2017	Osaka	Japan	Conpass	N/A
December 14, 2017	Seoul	South Korea	Hanatour V-Hall	N/A
North America
February 15, 2018	Seattle	United States	Neumos	Jay Som & Hand Habits
February 16, 2018	Vancouver	Canada	Biltmore	Jay Som & Hand Habits
February 17, 2018	Portland	United States	Crystal Ballroom (Note: This concert was part of the Sabertooth Festival)	Jay Som & Hand Habits
February 19, 2018	Reno	United States	The Holland Project	Jay Som & Hand Habits
February 21, 2018	San Jose	United States	The Ritz	Jay Som & Hand Habits
February 22, 2018	San Francisco	United States	Gray Theater (Note: This show was a part of the Noise Pop Festival)	Jay Som & Hand Habits
February 23, 2018	Fresno	United States	Strummer's	Jay Som & Hand Habits
February 24, 2018	Pomona	United States	The Glass House	Jay Som & Hand Habits
April 2, 2018	Baltimore	United States	The Ottobar	N/A
April 3, 2018	Durham	United States	Motorco Music Hall	N/A
April 4, 2018	Athens	United States	40 Watt Club	Snail Mail
April 5, 2018	Birmingham	United States	Saturn	Snail Mail
April 6, 2018	Orlando	United States	Will's Pub	Snail Mail
April 7, 2018	Tampa	United States	Crowbar	Snail Mail
April 9, 2018	Houston	United States	Walter's	N/A
April 10, 2018	Austin	United States	The Scoot Inn	Snail Mail
April 11, 2018	San Antonio	United States	Paper Tiger	Snail Mail
April 13, 2018	Tucson	United States	191 Toole	Snail Mail
April 15, 2018	Indio	United States	Empire Polo Club (Note: This concert was a part of the Coachella music festival)	N/A
April 18, 2018	San Luis Obispo	United States	SLO Brew	Snail Mail
April 22, 2018	Indio	United States	Empire Polo Club (Note: This concert was a part of the Coachella music festival)	N/A
April 23, 2018	Flagstaff	United States	The Green Room	Snail Mail
April 24, 2018	Santa Fe	United States	Meow Wolf	Snail Mail
April 26, 2018	Norman	United States	Norman Music Festival	N/A
April 27, 2018	Little Rock	United States	Stickyz	Snail Mail
April 28, 2018	Nashville	United States	Exit/In	Snail Mail
April 29, 2018	Columbus	United States	Ace of Cups	N/A
May 30, 2018	Washington D.C.	United States	9:30 Club	LVL UP, Radiator Hospital
May 31, 2018	New York City	United States	Warsaw	Radiator Hospital
June 2, 2018	Cambridge	United States	The Sinclair	LVL UP, Radiator Hospital
June 3, 2018	Philadelphia	United States	Union Transfer	LVL UP, Radiator Hospital
June 6, 2018	Richmond	United States	The Broadberry	N/A
June 7, 2018	Manchester	United States	Great Stage Park (Note: These shows were a part of the Bonnaroo Music Festival)	N/A
June 8, 2018	Manchester	United States	Great Stage Park	N/A
June 9, 2018	Manchester	United States	Great Stage Park	N/A
June 9, 2018	Charlotte	United States	Neighborhood Theatre	N/A
June 10, 2018	Manchester	United States	Great Stage Park (Note: This show was a part of the Bonnaroo Music Festival)	N/A
June 14, 2018	Pittsburgh	United States	Spirit	Half Waif
June 15, 2018	Cincinnati	United States	Taft Theatre	Half Waif
June 16, 2018	St. Louis	United States	The Ready Room	Half Waif
June 17, 2018	Kansas City	United States	The Record Bar	Half Waif
June 21, 2018	Las Vegas	United States	The Bunkhouse	N/A
June 23, 2018	Pomona	United States	The Glass House	N/A
June 26, 2018	Oakland	United States	Fox Oakland Theatre	N/A
July 12, 2018	Dennis	United States	Cape Cinema	N/A
July 13, 2018	Burlington	United States	ArtsRiot	N/A
July 14, 2018	Portsmouth	United States	3S ArtSpace	N/A
July 15, 2018	Kingston	United States	BSP Kingston	N/A
July 16, 2018	Rochester	United States	The Bug Jar	Mothers
July 18, 2018	Toronto	Canada	The Phoenix	Mothers
July 19, 2018	Grand Rapids	United States	The Pyramid Scheme	Mothers
July 20, 2018	Milwaukee	United States	Turner Hall	Mothers
July 22, 2018	Chicago	United States	Union Park (Note: This show was part of the Pitchfork Music Festival)	N/A
July 24, 2018	Cleveland	United States	The Beachland Ballroom	Mothers
July 28, 2018	New York City	United States	Randalls Island (Note: This show was part of the Panorama Music Festival)	N/A
August 11, 2018	Waynesville	United States	Renaissance Park (Note: This show was part of the Bellwether Music Festival)	N/A
September 12, 2018	Columbus	United States	Skully's	Ought
September 13, 2018	Bloomington	United States	The Bishop	Ought
September 14, 2018	DeKalb	United States	The House Cafe	Ought
September 16, 2018	Madison	United States	Majestic Theatre	Ought
September 18, 2018	Minneapolis	United States	Fine Line	Ought
September 19, 2018	Iowa City	United States	The Mill	Ought
September 20, 2018	Lincoln	United States	Lincoln Calling	N/A
September 21, 2018	Lincoln	United States	Lincoln Calling	N/A
September 22, 2018	Lincoln	United States	Lincoln Calling	N/A
September 23, 2018	Boise	United States	Neurolux	Ought
September 25, 2018	Seattle	United States	Neptune Theatre	Ought
October 2, 2018	Los Angeles	United States	The Fonda Theatre	Ought
October 3, 2018	Mesa	United States	The Nile	Ought
October 5, 2018	Austin	United States	Zilker Park (Note: These shows were part of the Austin City Limits Music Festival)	N/A
October 6, 2018	Austin	United States	Zilker Park	N/A
October 7, 2018	Austin	United States	Zilker Park	N/A
October 12, 2018	Austin	United States	Zilker Park	N/A
October 13, 2018	Austin	United States	Zilker Park	N/A
October 14, 2018	Austin	United States	Zilker Park	N/A
March 14, 2019	Austin	United States	Austin Convention Center (Note: This show was a part of South By Southwest)	N/A
May 4, 2019	Atlanta	United States	Central Park (Note: This show was a part of the Shaky Knees Music Festival)	N/A
May 10, 2019	Arcosanti	United States	FORM	N/A
May 11, 2019	Arcosanti	United States	FORM	N/A
May 12, 2019	Arcosanti	United States	FORM	N/A
Asia
May 13, 2019	Singapore		Esplanade Annexe Studio	Sobs
May 15, 2019	Jakarta	Indonesia	Rossi Musik	N/A
May 16, 2019	Bangkok	Thailand	Rockademy	N/A
May 18, 2019	Manila	Philippines	Circuit Makati (Note: This shows was part of the Rest Is Noise Festival.)	N/A
May 22, 2019	Tokyo	Japan	WWW X	N/A
May 24, 2019	Taipei	Taiwan	The Wall	N/A
May 27, 2019	Seoul	South Korea	MUV-Hall	N/A
North America
June 19, 2019	Calgary	Canada	Royal Canadian Legion (Note: This show was a part of the Sled Island Festival)	N/A
June 23, 2019	San Francisco	United States	Bill Graham Civic Auditorium	N/A
June 24, 2019	New York City	United States	Rumsey Playfield (Note: This show was part of the SummerStage music festival)	Hatchie
July 26, 2019	Camden	United States	BB&T Pavilion (Note: This show was part of the XPoNential Music Festival)	N/A
August 2, 2019	Chicago	United States	Grant Park (Note: This show was part of the Lollapalooza Music Festival)	N/A
August 2, 2019	Chicago	United States	Lincoln Hall	N/A
August 23, 2019	Portland	United States	Crystal Ballroom	N/A
August 24, 2019	Port Townsend	United States	Fort Worden (Note: These shows were a part of the Thing music festival)	N/A
August 25, 2019	Port Townsend	United States	Fort Worden	N/A
October 24, 2019	Halifax	Canada	Marquee Ballroom (Note: This show was a part of the Halifax Pop Explosion music festival)	N/A
October 25, 2019	New Orleans	United States	City Park (Note: These shows were a part of the Voodoo Music + Arts Experience music festival)	N/A
October 26, 2019	New Orleans	United States	City Park	N/A
October 27, 2019	New Orleans	United States	City Park	N/A
November 22, 2019	San Diego	United States	Wonderfront Music & Arts Festival	N/A
November 23, 2019	San Diego	United States	Wonderfront Music & Arts Festival	N/A
November 24, 2019	San Diego	United States	Wonderfront Music & Arts Festival	N/A

== Critical reception ==
Professional ratings
Aggregate scores
Source	Rating
AnyDecentMusic?	7.8/10
Metacritic	83/100
Review scores
Source	Rating
AllMusic	4/5 stars
The A.V. Club	A−
Consequence of Sound	B+
Drowned in Sound	8/10
Exclaim!	7/10
The Guardian	4/5 stars
Pitchfork	8.0/10
PopMatters	8/10
Q	4/5 stars
Uncut	8/10

Soft Sounds from Another Planet received widespread acclaim from music critics who praised its experimental production, eclectic range of genres and subject matter of grief and love. It received a weighted score of 83 out of 100 from review aggregate website Metacritic, indicating "universal acclaim", based on 20 reviews from music critics.

Reviewers lauded Zauner's vocals and the album's expanded sonic palette in comparison to Psychopomp. Nathan Reese of Pitchfork deemed the album's lead single, "Machinist" the band's "biggest leap forward in terms of sound" and favorably compared Zauner's vocals to shoegaze band Slowdive. No Ripcord's Juan Edgardo Rodriguez also complimented the eclectic range of genres on the album and opined Zauner to be "at her best when she builds upon her aching vocal delivery". Tim Sendra of AllMusic considered the album an improvement over Psychopomp and praised the songs', "spacious, expansive sound that envelops the listener in warmth (even when the synths get a little chilly.)"

Under the Radar's Stephen Mayne praised the album's nuanced perspective on romance and suggested that audiences "looking for something more beautiful need look no farther than what Zauner is already offering." The Quietus' Veronica Irwin praised the album for retaining the "heartfelt intensity" of its predecessor and Japanese Breakfast's relatable lyrics while expressing surprise at the record's sonic experimentation.

Some reviewers meanwhile criticized the album's perceived unevenness. Brian Shultz of The A.V. Club said, "And while everything on Japanese Breakfast's proper sophomore effort isn't entirely fresh, and its structure is somewhat loose, there's a confidence and crispness to Soft Sounds that shows just how fully realized Zauner's formerly homemade experiments have become." Exclaim!'s Ian Gormely noted the album's lack of focus but wrote, "In trying to put a wall between herself and her audience, she's opened a new, far more revealing side to her music and herself."

=== Accolades ===
Publication	Accolade	Rank	Ref.
Under the Radar	The 100 Best Albums of 2017	10	
Uproxx	The 50 Best Albums of 2017	15	
Stereogum	The 50 Best Albums of 2017	17	
Paste	The 50 Best Albums of 2017	37	
Rolling Stone	The 50 Best Albums of 2017	39	

== Track listing ==
All tracks are written by Michelle Zauner.

No.	Title	Length
1.	"Diving Woman"	6:33
2.	"Road Head"	3:15
3.	"Machinist"	3:37
4.	"Planetary Ambience"	1:17
5.	"Soft Sounds from Another Planet"	3:21
6.	"Boyish"	3:34
7.	"12 Steps"	2:37
8.	"Jimmy Fallon Big!"	2:36
9.	"The Body Is a Blade"	3:40
10.	"Till Death"	2:57
11.	"This House"	3:02
12.	"Here Come the Tubular Bells"	0:41
Total length:		37:11

== Personnel ==
Adapted from AllMusic.

- David Bartler – saxophone
- Asher Brooks – trumpet
- Jorge Elbrecht – mixing
- David Hartley – engineer
- Craig Hendrix – engineer, producer
- Michael Johnson – engineer
- Heba Kadry – mastering
- Craig Scheihing – photography
- Todd Schied – engineer
- Nathaniel David Utesch – design
- Michelle Zauner – vocals, guitars, producer

== Charts ==
Chart (2017)	Peak position
New Zealand Heatseekers Albums (RMNZ)	9
US Heatseekers Albums (Billboard)	9
US Independent Albums (Billboard)	18
