= Pitchfork Music Festival 2022 =

Music festival

- Dates: July 15–17, 2022
- Locations: Union Park, Chicago, United States
- Website: pitchforkmusicfestival.com

The Pitchfork Music Festival 2022 was held on July 15 to 17, 2022 at the Union Park, Chicago, United States. The festival was headlined by Mitski, the National and the Roots.

The festival was followed by after shows in various venues around Chicago with a line-up, including L'Rain, yeule, Camp Cope, and Ethel Cain.

== Lineup ==
Headline performers are listed in boldface. Artists listed from latest to earliest set times.

Green
Friday, July 15	Saturday, July 16	Sunday, July 17
**The National**; Parquet Courts; Indigo De Souza; The Spirit of the Beehive; Arooj Aftab	**Mitski**; Lucy Dacus; Dry Cleaning; The Linda Lindas (Note: Chubby and the Gang were set to perform but cancelled due to unforeseen circumstances. They were replaced by The Linda Lindas.); Jeff Parker & the New Breed	**The Roots**; Earl Sweatshirt; Natural Information Society (Note: BADBADNOTGOOD were set to perform but cancelled due to unforeseen circumstances. They were replaced by Natural Information Society.); KAINA; Pink Siifu

Red
Friday, July 15	Saturday, July 16	Sunday, July 17
Spiritualized; Tierra Whack; Wiki; Ethel Cain	Japanese Breakfast; Magdalena Bay; Hyd; CupcakKe	Toro y Moi; Noname; Injury Reserve; L'Rain

Blue
Friday, July 15	Saturday, July 16	Sunday, July 17
Amber Mark; Dawn Richard; Camp Cope; Spellling; Monaleo (Note: Tkay Maidza was supposed to perform but cancelled due to unforeseen circumstances. She was replaced by Monaleo.)	Low; Karate; Iceage yeule The Armed	Cate Le Bon; Tirzah; Xenia Rubinos; Erika de Casier; Sofia Kourtesis
