= Psychopomp (album) =

Studio album by Japanese Breakfast
- Released: April 1, 2016
- Recorded: 2014–2015
- Studios: CR Ensemble; Eugene, Oregon, U.S.
- Genres: Dream pop; indie pop; shoegaze; lo-fi
- Length: 25:11
- Labels: Yellow K; Dead Oceans
- Producers: Ned Eisenberg; Michelle Zauner

Japanese Breakfast chronology
Where Is My Great Big Feeling? (2014)	Psychopomp (2016)	Soft Sounds from Another Planet (2017)

Singles from Psychopomp
- 1. "In Heaven" Released: January 20, 2016; 2. "Everybody Wants To Love You" Released: February 18, 2016; 3. "The Woman That Loves You" Released: March 8, 2016

Psychopomp is the debut studio album by Japanese Breakfast, the solo musical project of Michelle Zauner of Little Big League. The album was released in the U.S. through Yellow K Records on April 1, 2016, and re-released internationally through Dead Oceans on August 19, 2016.

== Background ==
Michelle Zauner fronted the Philadelphian emo band Little Big League from 2011 until 2014, when she returned to her hometown of Eugene, Oregon, where her mother had been diagnosed with cancer.

While tending to her family in Oregon, Zauner began recording solo music as a self-meditative and "instant-gratification" feeling and because she found she had more to say after Tropical Jinx, the 2014 studio album by Little Big League. The work led to Psychopomp, published under her project Japanese Breakfast. Zauner said she chose the name "Japanese Breakfast" to juxtapose Asian exoticism and American culture. Psychopomp is named after the creature of the same name, which Zauner learned of in an essay by Swiss psychiatrist Carl Jung.

Zauner described the debut album as quite "dark and heavy-handed", although she had a desire to make the music urgent and "sonically upbeat." In the album, she discusses regret of not being there with her mother and her decision to get married before her mother went into a coma.

The album's cover features a photograph of Zauner's mother in her twenties, left, with an old friend in Seoul, Zauner wrote in her 2021 memoir Crying in H Mart.

Zauner, whose mother was Korean and her father Jewish American, has said she hopes that her work can help persuade more Asian Americans to get involved in music.

== Release and promotion ==
The album's rollout saw the release of three singles: "In Heaven," "Everybody Wants To Love You" and "The Woman That Loves You. "In Heaven," was released on January 20, 2016 and premiered via Stereogum as the album's lead single. "Everybody Wants to Love You" and "The Woman That Loves You" were released on February 18 and March 8 respectively. The latter track was premiered via The Fader. The album itself was released on April 1, 2016 in the US. After Japanese Breakfast signed to the record label Dead Oceans, Psychopomp was re-released internationally, both of on August 19, 2016.

=== Promotion ===
To promote the album, Zauner opened for Japanese-American singer-songwriter Mitski alongside American singer Jay Som. Later the same year, she performed in the UK to promote Psychopomp's then upcoming international re-release. Following these performances, Zauner toured with American band Porches in a joint tour to promote their respective albums.

== Composition ==
Psychopomp is a dream pop, indie pop, and lo-fi album. According to AllMusic's Tim Sendra, "the album has all the hallmarks of a homemade lo-fi album, but also has the feel of a wobbly '80s pop album played on a long-lost cassette." Sendra also wrote that the album's sound shifts between "guitar-lashed indie rock with swooping synths ("Rugged Country"), melancholy ballads played on tear-stained keys ("Jane Cum," "Triple 7"), driving pop/rock with pumped-up hooks ("Everybody Wants to Love You"), and bass-heavy, almost painfully heartfelt indie rock ("Heft")". Nina Corcocan of Consequence of Sound wrote: "It's lo-fi heart with detailed production, the type of pop that feels homey and familiar — which is doubly surprising given Zauner’s other band, Little Big League, is full of jock riffs and chunky guitar rock." PopMatters' Jasper Bruce thought that the album serves "cocktails of electronic, garage rock and lyrical vocals."

== Critical reception ==
Professional ratings
Aggregate scores
Source	Rating
AnyDecentMusic?	7.1/10
Metacritic	76/100
Review scores
Source	Rating
AllMusic	3.5/5 stars
Consequence of Sound	B
Pitchfork	7.9/10
PopMatters	7/10
Spin	7/10

Psychopomp received generally positive reviews from music critics. At Metacritic, which assigns a normalized rating out of 100 to reviews from critics, the album received an average score of 76, which indicates "generally favorable reviews", based on five reviews. AllMusic critic Tim Sendra, who described the record as "an impressive work by an artist well worth watching in the future", wrote, "Zauner's songs don't need dressing up; time and again she and Eisenberg make the right choices that allow the melodies to breathe and the emotions to flow unhindered by artifice." Consequence of Sound's Nina Corcoran wrote, "Psychopomp chases joy while replicating it in the process, leaving you full of the belief that this could be your year after all." Pitchfork critic Laura Snapes wrote that the record "offers much more than that: at once cosmically huge and acutely personal, Zauner captures grief for the perversely intimate yet overwhelming pain it is. Long may she keep at this music thing." PopMatters' Jasper Bruce wrote that Psychopomp "juggles spacy soundscapes with insistent, driving grooves. For the most part, the record pulls off this balancing act seemingly effortlessly and with style." Spin critic Anna Gaca described it as "a sharp-edged exploration of how loneliness and longing form into brittle personal shields."

PopMatters listed the album as number 3 on its list of "The 10 Best Shoegaze and Dream Pop Albums of 2016".

== Track listing ==
All lyrics are written by Michelle Zauner.

No.	Title	Length
1.	"In Heaven"	3:50
2.	"The Woman That Loves You"	2:24
3.	"Rugged Country"	2:53
4.	"Everybody Wants to Love You"	2:12
5.	"Psychopomp"	1:15
6.	"Jane Cum"	3:31
7.	"Heft"	3:37
8.	"Moon on the Bath"	1:29
9.	"Triple 7"	4:00
Total length:		25:11

== Personnel ==
Musicians

- Michelle Zauner – guitar, keyboards, vocals
- Peter Bradley – bass
- Nick Hawley-Gamer – guitar
- Colin Redmond – percussion, clarinet
- Ned Eisenberg – keys
- Adam Ponto – strings
- Sam Cook-Parrott – backup vocals on "Everybody Wants to Love You!"

Production

- Ned Eisenberg – producer, mixing
- Michelle Zauner – producer
- Colin Redmond – engineer at CR Ensemble in Eugene, Oregon
- Alex Santilli – mastered at Spice House Sound in Philadelphia, Pennsylvania
- Ben Pubusky – art design
