= Yohuna =

American singer

Johanne Swanson, known by the stage name Yohuna, is a New York City-based musician. She released her debut album as Yohuna in 2016 on Orchid Tapes titled Patientness. The album received a 7.2 out of 10 rating from Pitchfork. Swanson released her second album on Orchid Tapes in 2019 titled Mirroring.

== Discography ==
Studio albums

- Patientness (2016, Orchid Tapes)
- Mirroring (2019, Orchid Tapes)
