= Slutever =

American punk rock band

Slutever was a punk rock band based in Los Angeles, California, consisting of Nicole Snyder and Rachel Gagliardi, both of whom are from Philadelphia. Gagliardi is also a member of the bands Upset and Pouty.

== History ==
Snyder and Gagliardi met in high school, where they were both enrolled in the same music program. However, they did not begin performing together until they were both in college. By June 2013, Slutever had recorded all six songs that they would later self-release on the EP Almost Famous on February 17, 2015. The band decided to revisit these songs after beginning a tour on the East Coast with Girlpool. Slutever disbanded in January 2017.

== Critical reception ==
Writing for Exclaim!, Alison Lang awarded Almost Famous a rating of 7 out of 10, and wrote that it "maintains Slutever's well-established goofy stoner ethos while also coming across as super polished and assured." Robert Christgau gave the EP an A−, writing of the band that "To call their self-imposed limits principled would misread their purpose. These women don't want to be momentous because what they've achieved already was fucking hard. They don't want to be momentous because enough is enough." Brennan Carley wrote in Spin that Slutever "deliver on their promise of grit-punk with an inescapably memorable twist" on the EP. The band has been called riot grrrl by some critics, but Snyder has said she disagrees with this characterization, saying that “I think the confusion was made because we were two girls in a loud punk band, but our songs were never about any heavy issues."

== Discography ==
- Sorry I'm Not Sorry (self-released single, 2010)
- Pretend to be Nice (Bantic single, 2011)
- 1994 (Jade Tree 7", 2013)
- White Flag (Quiet Year/Say-10/Earthbound/Songs From The Road single, 2014)
- Almost Famous (self-released EP, 2015)
