= W.O.W. Hall =

Performing arts venue in Eugene, Oregon

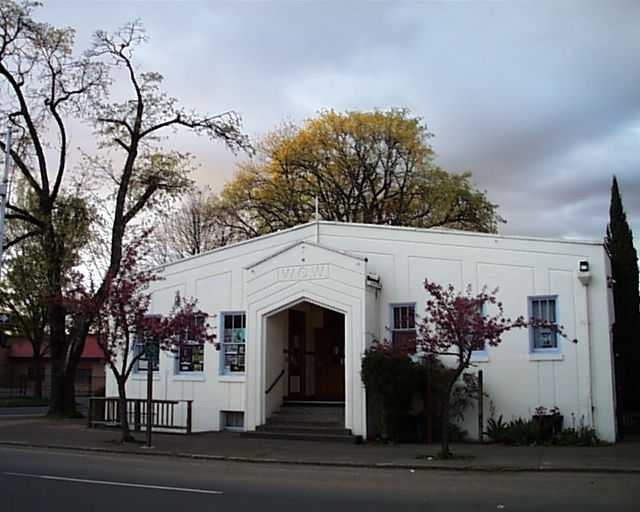
- Interactive map of W.O.W. Hall
- Address: 291 W. 8th Ave.
- Location: Eugene, Oregon
- Owner: Community Center for the Performing Arts
- Capacity: 600

Construction
- Opened: 1932

Website
- www.wowhall.org
- Woodmen of the World Hall
- U.S. National Register of Historic Places
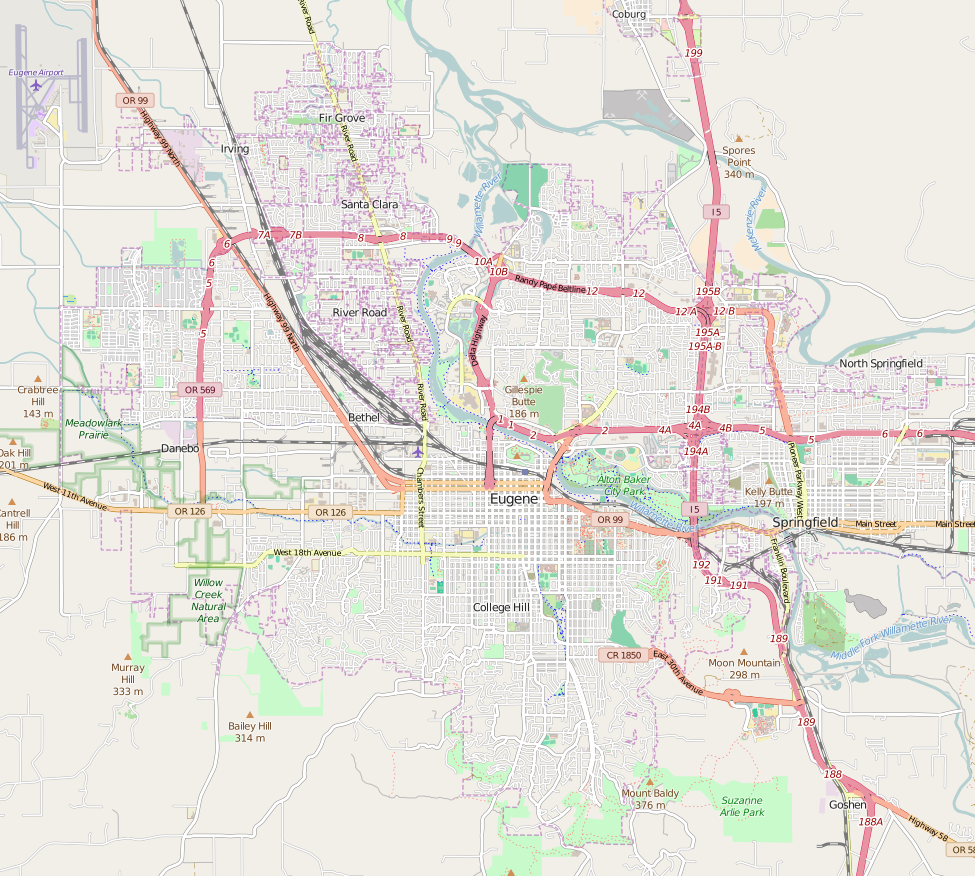
- Location within Eugene OR Location within Oregon
- Coordinates: 44°3′4.24″N 123°5′49.59″W
- Architect: John Hunzicker, W. B. Baker
- Architectural style: Modern movement, Art Deco
- NRHP reference No.: 96000618
- Added to NRHP: June 3, 1996

The W.O.W. Hall, also stylized as WOW Hall, (AKA Community Center for the Performing Arts) is a performing arts venue in Eugene, Oregon, United States.

The lot was bought in 1906 by the Woodmen of the World (W.O.W.) lodge, and later in 1932 they built the current structure, which was the most expensive building built in Eugene that year at $8,000. The hall was installed with a floating hard maple dance floor to be used for square dancing and ballroom dancing.

In 1975, the hall was up for sale and was in danger of being demolished. Eventually, patrons of the hall organized to form the Committee to Secure a Westside Community Center for the Performing Arts. They got a first option to purchase the lease for the hall when it went up for sale in December of that year. A multi-day community fundraiser event welcoming many local performers and a film festival was held at the WOW Hall in 1975 in hopes of raising funds to acquire the structure, which compiled sufficient income to acquire the property lease. In 1983 the committee was able to buy the property and burned the lease in celebration.

The WOW Hall is a 501c3 nonprofit organization listed as the Community Center for the Performing Arts, overseen by a board of directors, with events operated by community volunteers and a small staff.

Operating as an all-ages concert venue and community center, the facility hosts performances by local and national acts. It also regularly hosts community meetings, dance, and education programs.

The WOW Hall has hosted early performances for artists that would go on to iconic careers such as Pearl Jam, Alice in Chains, Nirvana, Fugazi, Black Flag, Brandi Carlile, SZA, Chappell Roan, A.F.I., Dead Kennedys, Fear, Black Eyed Peas, and The Avett Brothers among many others; as well as local Eugene acts that have gone on to earn global acclaim like Cherry Poppin' Daddies, Tracy Bonham, Japanese Breakfast, Warpaint, Mat Kearney and Floater.

The WOW Hall offers a wide array of performances, including live music, comedy, and dance parties. It regularly celebrates the music of the Grateful Dead, often hosting tribute acts and artists that emulate their sound. A large portrait of Grateful Dead frontman Jerry Garcia hangs in the WOW Hall offices in tribute.

The W.O.W. Hall was listed on the National Register of Historic Places in 1996.

During the COVID-19 pandemic, like many venues around the world, the WOW Hall was shut down for an extended time out of concern of public health, surviving on grants and emergency funding. The venue returned to live events under adherence to health protocols in 2021.

On January 14, 2022, a shooting outside the venue hospitalized six people. As of January 18, no arrests have been made and police seek one suspect. In the time since the WOW Hall has implemented additional security measures in an attempt to avoid further incidents. Three of the victims were rappers and they are searching for a male in a hoodie. As of December 2024, no one has captured.

In 2023 a "Raise the Roof" fundraising campaign was successful in compiling enough donations for repair or replacement of the historic structure's roof.
