= Little Big League (band) =

Rock band from Philadelphia

- Origin: Philadelphia, Pennsylvania, U.S.
- Genres: Emo; emo revival; indie rock; alternative rock; noise rock
- Years active: 2011–2014, 2016
- Labels: Run for Cover; Tiny Engines
- Past members: Michelle Zauner; Deven Craige; Kevin O'Halloran; Ian Dykstra

Little Big League was an American rock band from Philadelphia, Pennsylvania.

Little Big League began in October 2011. They were signed to Tiny Engines and Run for Cover Records, and released two studio albums: These Are Good People in 2013 and Tropical Jinx in 2014.

After frontwoman Michelle Zauner's mother was diagnosed with cancer in 2014, she moved back to Eugene, Oregon. Working under the name Japanese Breakfast, she recorded two digital releases, American Sound and Where Is My Great Big Feeling?, and in April 2016, released the album Psychopomp on Yellow K Records.

Little Big League returned for a few shows in 2016, but effectively broke up after that as Zauner and Craige focused on Japanese Breakfast, and guitarist Kevin O'Halloran joined the band Mercury Girls. From 2015 to 2017 drummer Ian Dykstra was also in the band Sheer Mag.

== Band members ==
- Michelle Zauner – vocals, guitar
- Deven Craige – bass
- Kevin O'Halloran – guitar
- Ian Dykstra – drums

== Discography ==
Studio albums

- These Are Good People (2013)
- Tropical Jinx (2014)

EPs

- Little Big League (2012)

Splits

- Little Big League/Ovlov (2014)
