= Japanese Breakfast =

American indie pop band

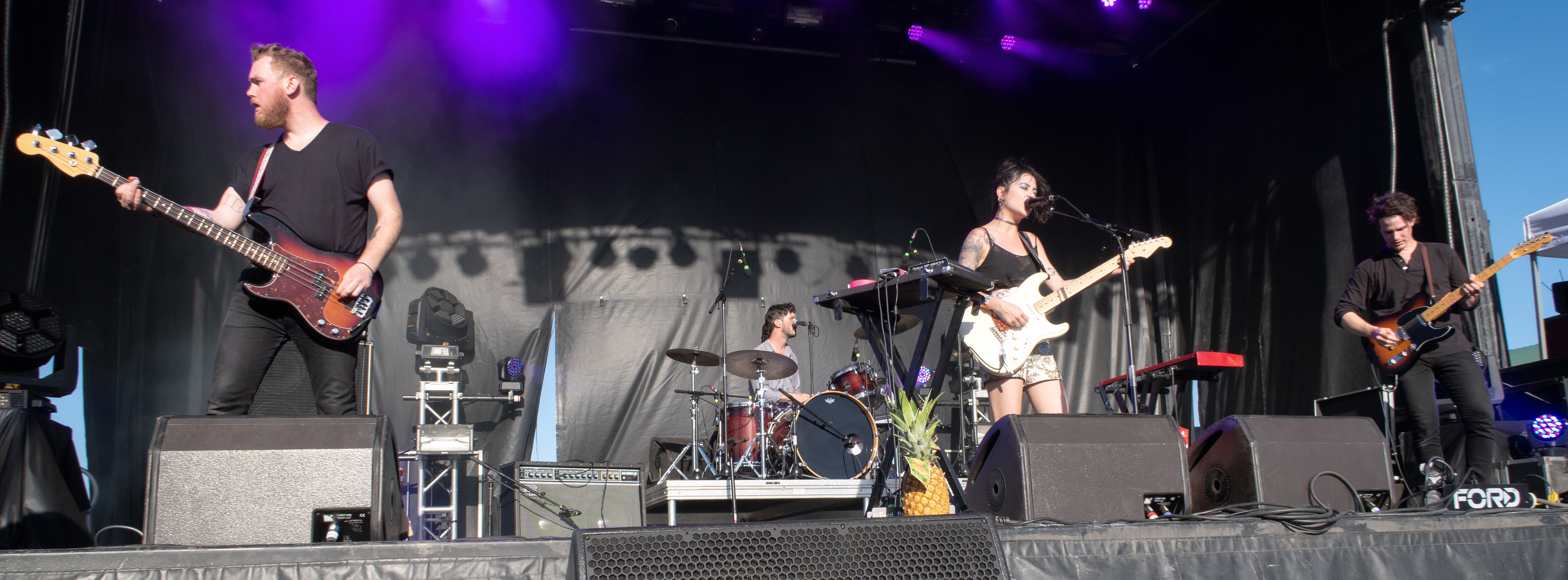
- Japanese Breakfast performing in 2018. From left to right: Deven Craige, Craig Hendrix, Michelle Zauner and Peter Bradley.

Background information
- Origin: Philadelphia, Pennsylvania, U.S.
- Genres: Indie pop; indie rock; dream pop; shoegaze; chamber pop; experimental pop
- Years active: 2013–present
- Labels: Ranch; Seagreen; Yellow K; Dead Oceans; Polyvinyl; W Hotels; Sony Masterworks
- Spinoff of: Little Big League
- Members: Michelle Zauner; Craig Hendrix; Peter Bradley; Deven Craige; Adam Schatz; Lauren Baba
- Past members: Leslie Bear; Kat Casale
- Website: japanesebreakfast.rocks

Japanese Breakfast is an American indie pop band from Philadelphia, Pennsylvania, formed in 2013. The project is fronted by vocalist, guitarist and primary songwriter Michelle Zauner; she is joined in its current iteration by long-serving musicians Peter Bradley (guitar), Deven Craige (bass), and Craig Hendrix (drums, keyboards, backing vocals), as well as violinist Lauren Baba and saxophonist Adam Schatz, who have been with the ensemble since 2021.

Zauner started the band as a side project in 2013, when she was leading the Philadelphia-based emo group Little Big League. She has said that she named the band after seeing a GIF animation of Japanese breakfast. She thought the term would be "exotic" to Americans, and that it would make others wonder what a "Japanese breakfast" consists of.

In 2014, she returned to her hometown of Eugene, Oregon, to care for her ailing mother. She continued to record music and songs, first to cope with stress, then, after her mother died, with grief. The songs eventually became Japanese Breakfast's debut studio album: Psychopomp (2016), released by Yellow K Records. Its critical and commercial success led Japanese Breakfast to sign with the record label Dead Oceans, which released the band's second and third studio albums: Soft Sounds from Another Planet (2017) and Jubilee (2021). Jubilee was nominated for Best Alternative Music Album and Japanese Breakfast for Best New Artist at the 64th Annual Grammy Awards and became the band's first album to chart on the Billboard 200, where it peaked at 56. The project's fourth studio album, For Melancholy Brunettes (& Sad Women), was released in 2025.

== History ==
=== 2013–2016: Early releases and Psychopomp ===
Japanese Breakfast's first release was a split with Saint Louis emo band Foxing on February 3, 2013, which featured Zauner's first recorded version of "The Woman That Loves You" (later re-recorded and released on 2016's "Psychopomp").

The second Japanese Breakfast release was June (2013), the result of a month-long project in which Zauner and Rachel Gagliardi recorded one song a day and posted them on the Tumblr blog rachelandmichelledojune.

In 2014, Zauner participated as Japanese Breakfast in a song project with musicians Gabrielle Smith, Florist, Frankie Cosmos, and Small Wonder, who posted songs daily on the Tumblr blog may5to12songs. She released her songs from the project on Bandcamp as two digital albums: Where Is My Great Big Feeling?, released on June 6; and American Sound on June 24. Both were released weeks later as the cassette tape American Sound/Where Is My Great Big Feeling.

While in Oregon with her family in 2014, Zauner continued recording as Japanese Breakfast, starting with samples of music as a meditative exercise and "instant gratification". She said she had more to say after Tropical Jinx, the 2014 studio album by her emo group Little Big League.

In 2015, while working at an advertising agency, Zauner recorded her first studio album as Japanese Breakfast: Psychopomp, named for the mythological creature. She said her "dark and heavy-handed" record dealt with her mother's death, although she tried to make the music urgent and "sonically upbeat." The album's rollout on Yellow K Records began in January 2016 with the release of the single "In Heaven" via Stereogum. A second single, titled "Everybody Wants to Love You" was released on February 18, 2016, and the album itself was released on April 1, 2016. Around this time, Japanese Breakfast signed with Dead Oceans, which on June 23, 2016, announced the signing and said Psychopomp would be re-released internationally. A music video for "Jane Cum" was also released the same day. To promote the album, the band opened for Japanese-American singer-songwriter Mitski alongside American musician Jay Som and released a music video for the song "Everybody Wants to Love You" which was later ranked as the 154th best song of the 2010s decade by Quinn Moreland of Pitchfork.

By 2016, Japanese Breakfast had become a band, consisting initially of Zauner (lead vocals, guitars), Kat Casale (drums), and Craig Hendrix (drums, keyboards, bass, guitars). The band assumed its current lineup in 2017, when Leslie Bear briefly joined on bass, Casale left, and the band added Devin Craige (bass) and Peter Bradley (guitar).

=== 2017–2018: Soft Sounds from Another Planet ===
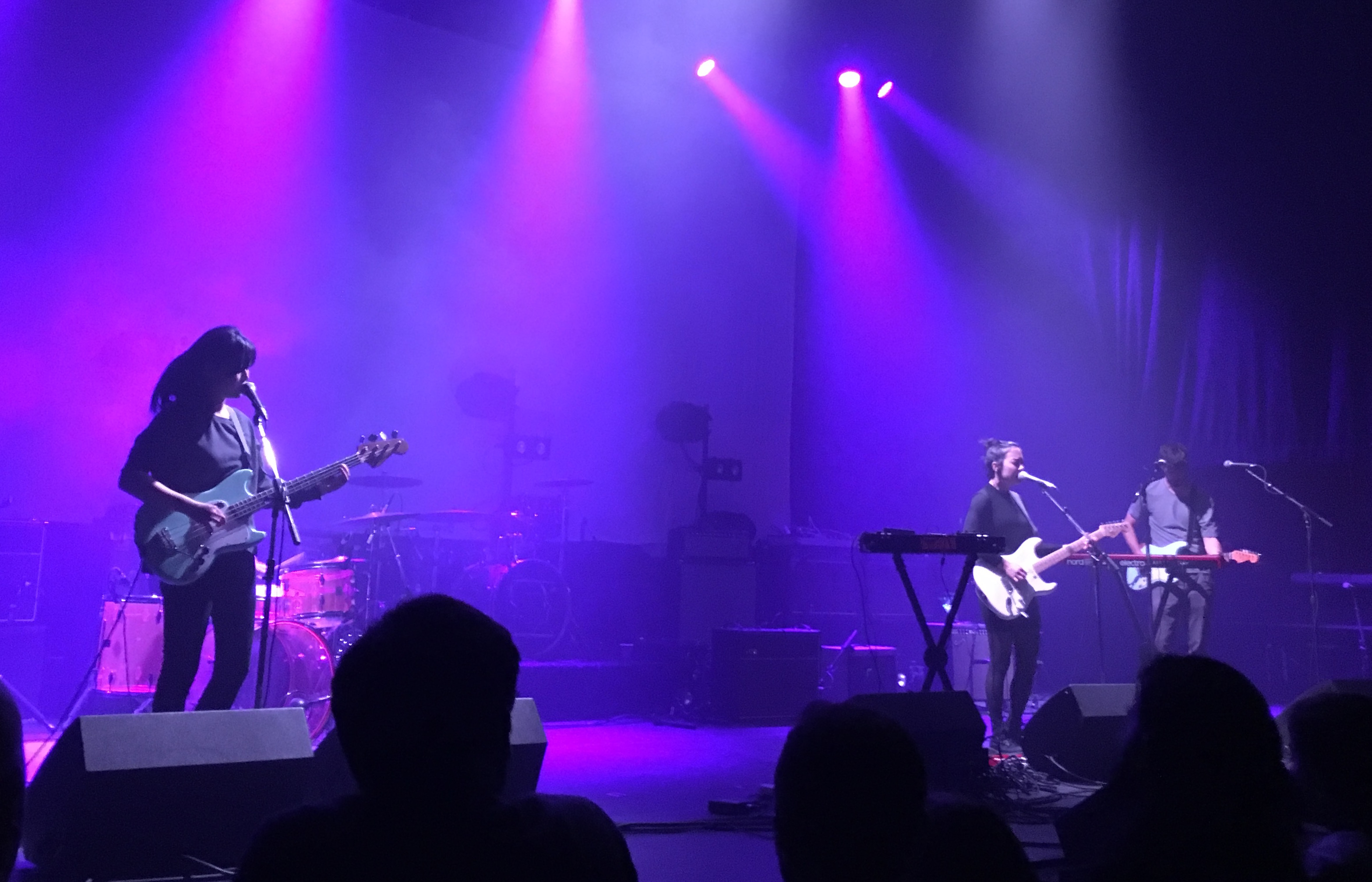
Zauner performing live with her band in 2017

On May 4, 2017, Japanese Breakfast released the single "Machinist" and announced the upcoming release of a second studio album, Soft Sounds from Another Planet, whose lyrics are largely concerned with Zauner's detachment and trauma. The song "Boyish" was released as a single on June 7, 2017. A third single from the album, "Road Head", was released on July 6, 2017. The full album was released on July 14, 2017. To promote the album, the band released a video game, "Japanese BreakQuest", in which the main character, "J-Brekkie", gathers a band to prevent an alien invasion. The game was developed by Zauner and game designer Elaine Fath, and uses songs from the album, rendered as 8-bit MIDI tracks by Peter Bradley. To support the album, Japanese Breakfast toured Oceania, Asia and North America from 2017 to 2019. Along the way, the band opened for English shoegaze band Slowdive, American musician Alex G, and Canadian duo Tegan and Sara.

On October 19, 2017, a music video for "Body is a Blade" was released. It was animated using old family photographs and video of Zauner visiting locations from the photos. She described it as "a really personal mixed media piece, almost like a moving scrapbook". On February 13, 2018, the music video for "Boyish" was released. It depicts a girl going to a high school dance, where Zauner and her band, accompanied by fellow indie musician Leslie Bear, are playing a set. The video also features a cameo appearance by musician Lindsey Jordan and was directed by Zauner, who at the time of its release described it as her "favorite video yet" and has retrospectively considered it to be her "magnum opus".

=== 2018–2024: Jubilee and Sable ===
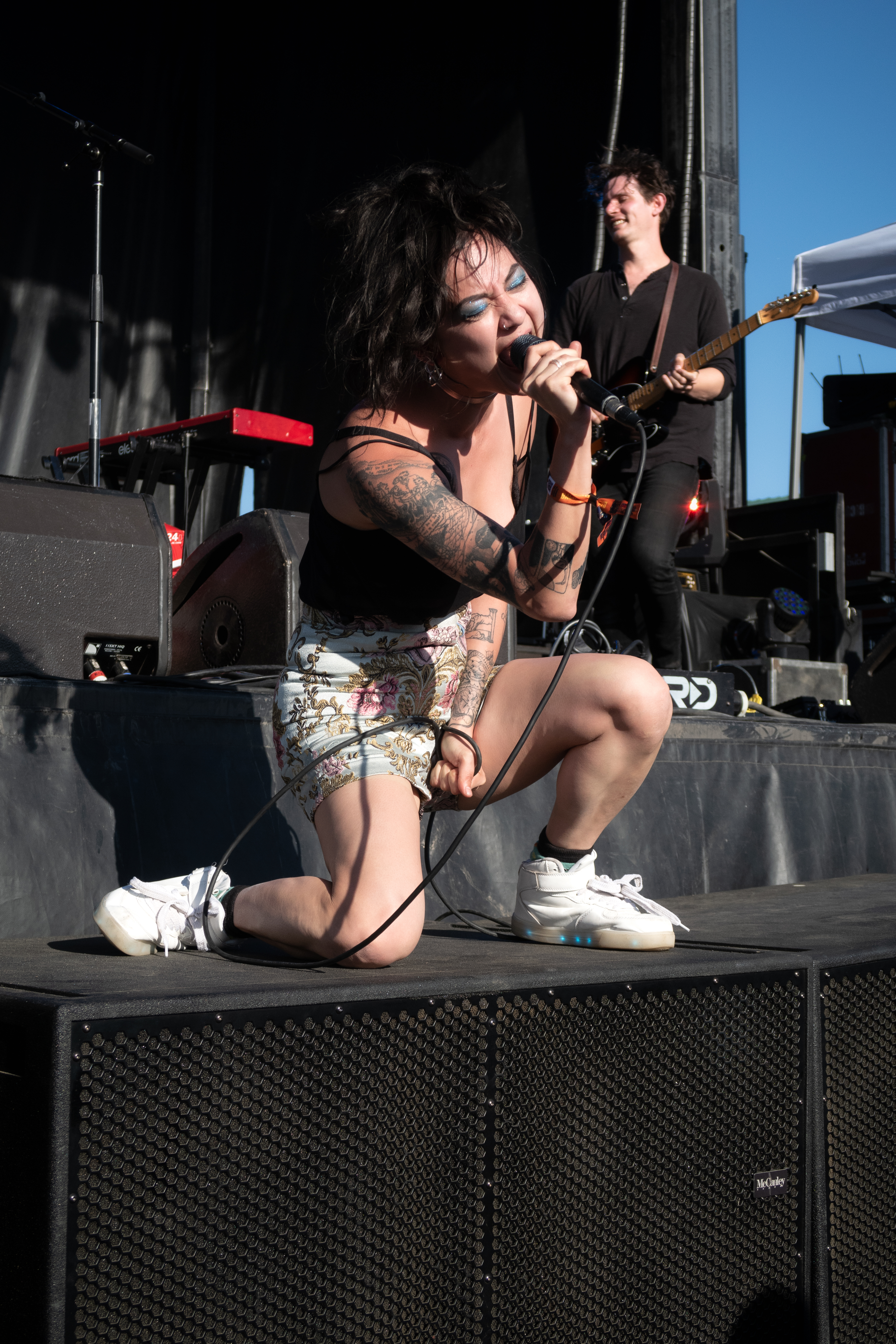
Japanese Breakfast performing live in 2018 at the Sasquatch! Music Festival

In 2018, indie game developer Shedworks sent Zauner preliminary images from their video game Sable and commissioned her to write its soundtrack. Unlike the pop songs she writes for Japanese Breakfast, the Sable soundtrack is mostly ambient music. Zauner took inspiration from other game soundtracks, notably the soundtracks to the Final Fantasy games, Secret of Mana (1993), Chrono Cross (1999) and two games in The Legend of Zelda series: Majora's Mask (2000) and Breath of the Wild (2017). Her commission was announced during E3 2018. The game was to be released in 2019, but was delayed twice. In 2020, during the COVID-19 lockdown, Zauner began reworking the songs after playing updated versions of the game. The game and its soundtrack were released on September 23, 2021.

In 2019, Japanese Breakfast released two singles under the W Hotels music label: "Essentially" and a cover of the Tears for Fears song "Head over Heels." Zauner recorded the singles in Bali, which she described as a "glamorous change" because she had typically recorded in "cold studios." Proceeds from the latter single were donated to the American Civil Liberties Union. That year, Zauner told Flood Magazine that she aimed to make a "fun album" for Japanese Breakfast's third album. This would manifest as Jubilee, her second studio album for the Dead Oceans label.

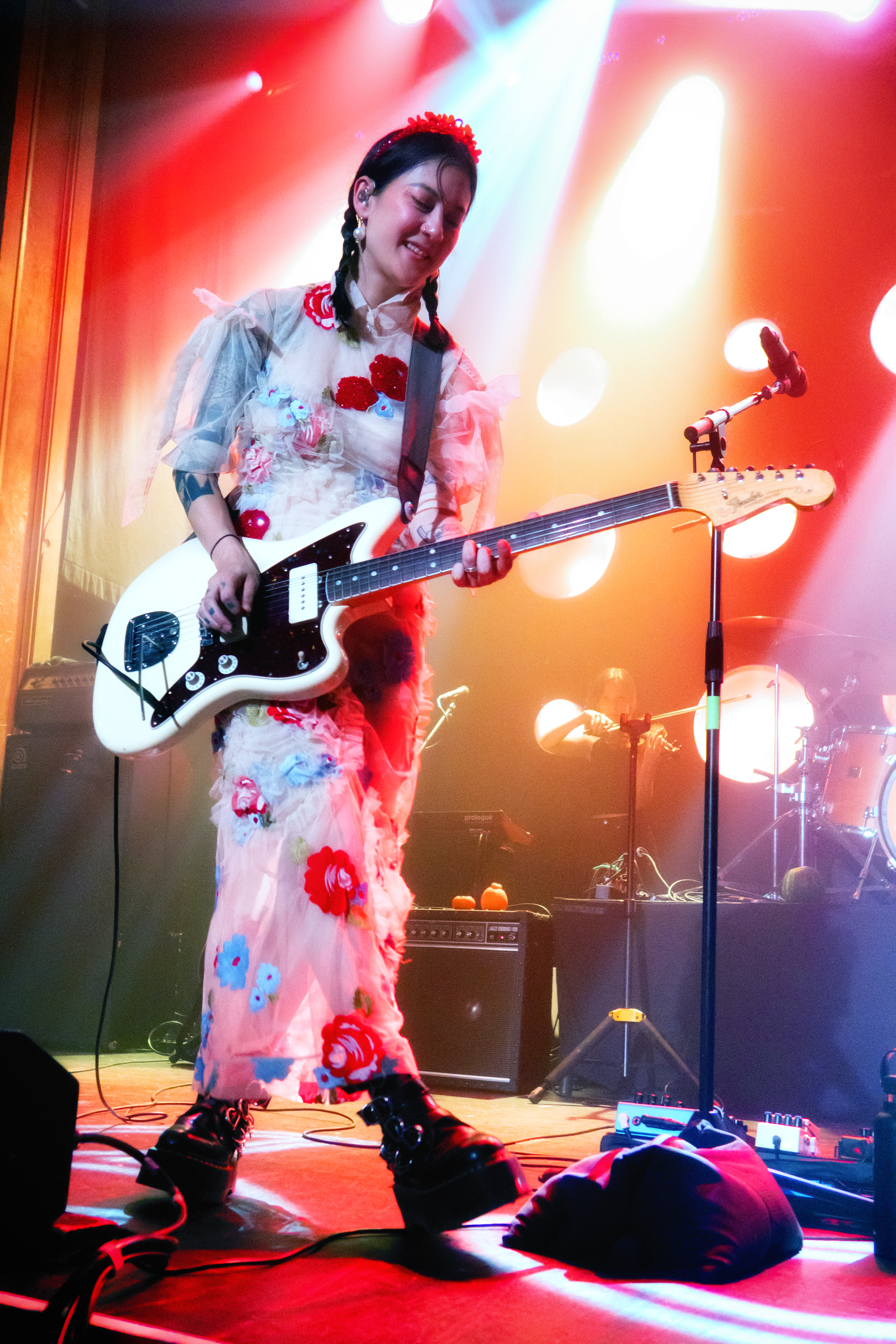
Zauner in 2021 performing live with her band at the Neptune Theatre in Seattle

The rollout of Jubilee began on March 2, 2021, with the release of the album's lead single, "Be Sweet", and a video for the song. Two other singles—"Posing in Bondage" and "Savage Good Boy"—were released before the album itself dropped on June 4. Zauner said the album was inspired by joy, in contrast to earlier Japanese Breakfast albums, and that she was inspired to "go big" by Icelandic musician Björk's third album, Homogenic (1997). Jubilee was nominated for the Grammy Award for Best Alternative Music Album and Japanese Breakfast for the Grammy Award for Best New Artist, but lost at the 64th Annual Grammy Awards to St. Vincent's album Daddy's Home and to Olivia Rodrigo. On August 7, Japanese Breakfast embarked on the Jubilee Tour.

In March 2022, Japanese Breakfast announced that they would open for English indie rock band Florence and the Machine and American indie rock bands the National and the Yeah Yeah Yeahs.

In mid-2022, Japanese Breakfast and Chicago-based Goose Island Brewery teamed up to produce a limited-edition lager named "Be Sweet" after the song. The beer was sold at the Pitchfork Music Festival in July 2022; proceeds were donated to Heart of Dinner, a charity that helps elderly Asian-Americans who struggle with food insecurity in New York City.

In October 2023, after the end of the Jubilee Tour, Zauner said she planned to move in December to Seoul, South Korea, for a year to work on a new album and a new book.

=== 2025–present: For Melancholy Brunettes (& Sad Women) ===
The band's fourth album, For Melancholy Brunettes (& Sad Women), recorded at Sound City Studios in Los Angeles and produced by Blake Mills, was released by Dead Oceans on March 21, 2025.

On March 18, 2025, the band revealed on social media that they had written a song for Celine Song's 2025 film Materialists. On July 10, 2025, the band appeared as a featured artist on the Silica Gel single "NamgungFefere" (南宮Fefere), with Zauner contributing vocals and lyrics. "NamgungFefere" marks the first time Zauner has written Korean lyrics for a song.

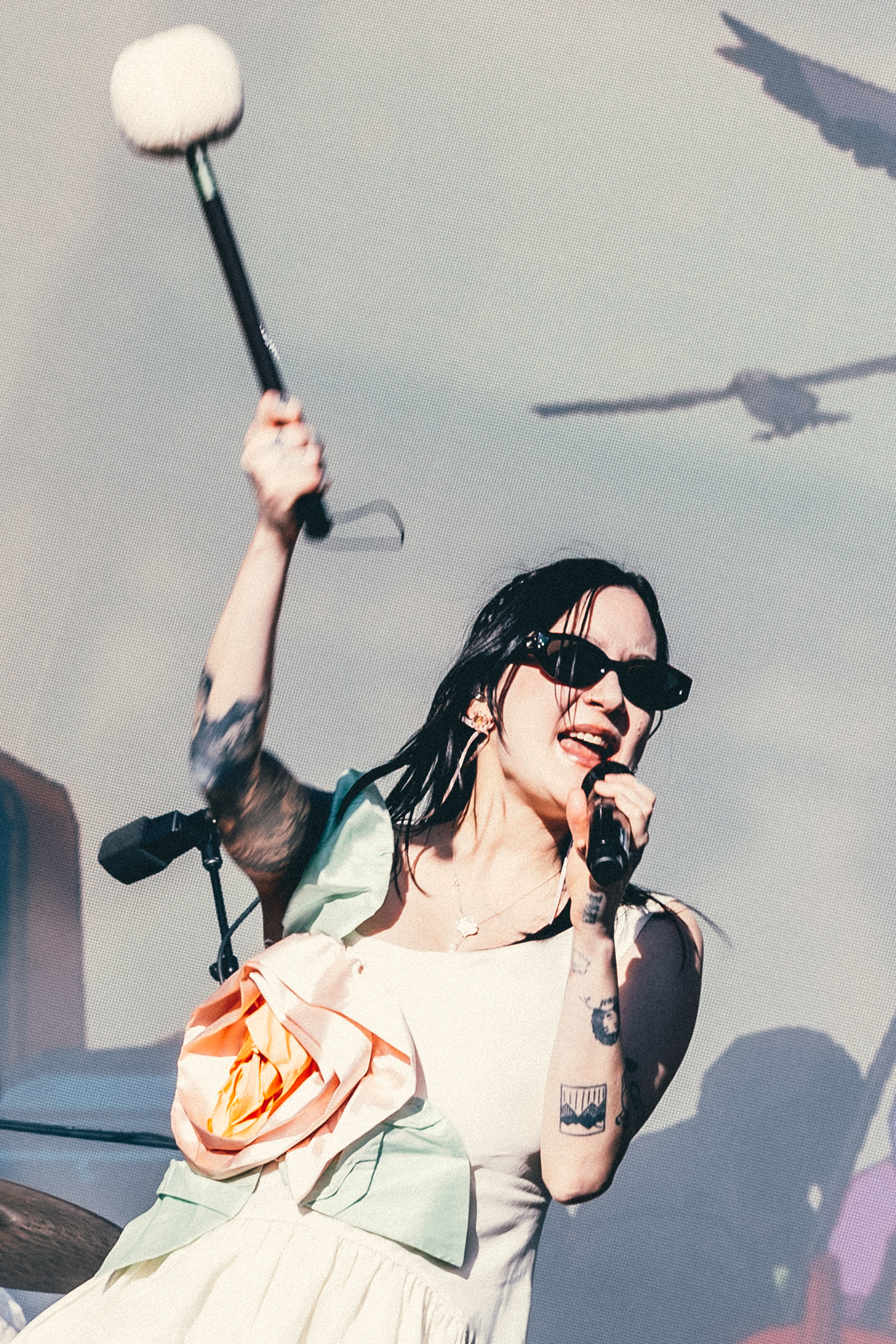
Michelle Zauner as Japanese Breakfast performing at Kilby Block Party 2026 in Salt Lake City, Utah.

In September 2025, the band joined the No Music For Genocide boycott to geo-block their music from music streaming platforms in Israel in protest of the Gaza genocide.

== Musical style ==
Japanese Breakfast's sound has primarily been described as indie pop containing elements of experimental pop, lo-fi, dream pop and indie rock. The band's early releases, including Psychopomp, have been described as lo-fi while later releases, including the band's second and third albums, Soft Sounds from Another Planet and Jubilee have primarily been labeled as indie pop with elements of shoegaze and chamber pop. Sable has been described as ambient music.

The band has re-recorded and re-released songs to give them wider audiences. Psychopomp includes songs from American Sound and Where Is My Great Big Feeling. Soft Sounds includes "Boyish", originally released as "Day 6" on June. Jubilee includes "In Hell", originally a bonus track on the Japanese deluxe edition of Soft Sounds.

== Band members ==
- Michelle Zauner – lead vocals, rhythm guitar (2013–present)
- Craig Hendrix – drums, percussion, keyboards, backing vocals (2017–present), bass (2016–2017), additional guitar (2017, 2025–present)
- Deven Craige – bass (2017–present)
- Peter Bradley – lead guitar (2017–present)
- Lauren Baba – violin, keyboards, percussion, backing vocals (2021–present)
- Adam Schatz – saxophone, keyboards, percussion, backing vocals (2021–present)

Former members

- Leslie Bear – bass, backing vocals (2017)
- Kat Casale – drums, percussion (2016–2017)

== Discography ==
Japanese Breakfast discography
- Studio albums: 4
- EPs: 8
- Soundtrack albums: 1
- Compilation albums: 1
- Singles: 13

=== Studio albums ===
Title	Album details	Peak chart positions									
Title	Album details	US	US Alt	US Indie	US Rock	GER	NED Vinyl	NZ Heat	SCO	UK	UK Indie
Psychopomp	Released: April 1, 2016; Label: Yellow K, Dead Oceans; Format: LP, CD, cassette, digital download, streaming	—	—	—	—	—	—	—	—	—	—
Soft Sounds from Another Planet	Released: July 14, 2017; Label: Dead Oceans; Format: LP, CD, cassette, digital download, streaming	— (Note: Soft Sounds from Another Planet did not enter the US Billboard 200 but did peak at number 9 on the Heatseekers Albums chart.)	—	18	—	—	—	9	—	—	46
Jubilee	Released: June 4, 2021; Label: Dead Oceans; Format: LP, CD, cassette, digital download, streaming	56	7	7	8	77	31	—	11	53	3
For Melancholy Brunettes (& Sad Women)	Released: March 21, 2025; Label: Dead Oceans; Format: LP, CD, cassette, digital download, streaming	46	4	8	7	—	—	—	6	79	5
"—" denotes album that did not chart or was not released

=== Soundtrack albums ===
Title	Album details	Peak chart positions	
Title	Album details	US Sales	UK OST
Sable (Original Video Game Soundtrack)	Released: September 24, 2021; Label: Sony Masterworks; Formats: LP, CD, digital download, streaming	48	7

=== Compilation albums ===
Title	Album details
June	Released: June 1, 2013; Label: Ranch; Formats: Cassette, digital download

=== EPs ===
Title	EP details
American Sound	Released: June 6, 2014; Label: Seagreen; Formats: Cassette, digital download
Where Is My Great Big Feeling?	Released: June 6, 2014; Label: Seagreen; Formats: Cassette, digital download
Japanese Breakfast on Audiotree Live	Released: August 16, 2016; Label: Audiotree Music; Formats: Digital download, streaming
Spotify Singles	Released: April 28, 2018; Label: Dead Oceans; Formats: 7-inch, digital download, streaming
Polyvinyl 4-Track Singles Series, Vol. 3	Released: September 28, 2018; Label: Dead Oceans; Formats: 7-inch, digital download, streaming
W Records x Japanese Breakfast	Released: July 5, 2019; Label: W; Formats: 7-inch, digital download, streaming
Live at Electric Lady	Released: October 18, 2021; Label: Dead Oceans; Formats: Streaming
Spotify Singles	Released: March 30, 2022; Label: Dead Oceans; Formats: Streaming

=== Singles ===
Title	Year	Chart positions					Certifications	Album
Title	Year	US AAA	US Alt.	US Rock Air.	BEL (FL)	ICE	Certifications	Album
"In Heaven"	2016	—	—	—	—	—		Psychopomp
"The Woman That Loves You"	2016	—	—	—	—	—		Psychopomp
"Everybody Wants to Love You"	2016	—	—	—	—	—		Psychopomp
"Machinist"	2017	—	—	—	—	—		Soft Sounds from Another Planet
"Boyish"	2017	—	—	—	—	—		Soft Sounds from Another Planet
"Road Head"	2017	—	—	—	—	—		Soft Sounds from Another Planet
"Essentially"	2019	—	—	—	—	—		W Records X Japanese Breakfast
"Head over Heels"	2019	—	—	—	—	—		W Records X Japanese Breakfast
"Be Sweet"	2021	7	34	38	— (Note: "Be Sweet" did not enter the Ultratop Top 50, but spent 4 weeks as an extra tip on the Ultratop Bubbling Under chart.)	4	RIAA: Gold	Jubilee
"Posing in Bondage"	2021	—	—	—	—	—		Jubilee
"Savage Good Boy"	2021	—	—	—	—	—		Jubilee
"Paprika"	2021	—	—	—	—	—		Jubilee
"Slide Tackle"	2021	16	—	—	—	—		Jubilee
"Glider"	2021	—	—	—	—	—		Sable
"Nobody Sees Me Like You Do"	2022	—	—	—	—	—		Ocean Child: Songs of Yoko Ono
"The Ballad of the Witches' Road (Pop Version)" from Agatha All Along	2024	—	—	—	—	—		Non-album single
"Orlando in Love"	2025	28	—	—	—	—		For Melancholy Brunettes (& Sad Women)
"Picture Window"	2025	15	—	—	—	—		For Melancholy Brunettes (& Sad Women)
"—" denotes a recording that did not chart or was not released in that territory.

==== As featured artist ====
Title	Year	Album
"Maybes" (Giraffage featuring Japanese Breakfast)	2017	Too Real
"NamgungFefere" (Silica Gel featuring Japanese Breakfast)	2025	Non-album single

=== Music videos ===
Title	Year	Director(s)	Ref.
"In Heaven"	2016	Adam Kolodny	
"Jane Cum"	2016	Adam Kolodny	
"Everybody Wants To Love You"	2016	Michelle Zauner and Adam Kolodny	
"Machinist"	2017	Michelle Zauner	
"Road Head"	2017	Michelle Zauner	
"The Body Is a Blade"	2017	Michelle Zauner	
"Boyish"	2018	Michelle Zauner	
"Be Sweet"	2021	Michelle Zauner	
"Posing in Bondage"	2021	Michelle Zauner	
"Savage Good Boy"	2021	Michelle Zauner	
"Orlando in Love"	2025	Michelle Zauner	
"Picture Window"	2025	Michelle Zauner	
"Mega Circuit"	2025	Michelle Zauner	
"Winter in LA"	2025	Peter Ash Lee & Michelle Zauner	

== Tours ==
=== Headlining ===
- Psychopomp Tour (2016–2017)
- Soft Sounds from Another Planet Tour (2017–2019)
- Jubilee Tour (2021–2022)
- Melancholy Tour (2025)

== Awards and nominations ==
Year	Association	Category	Nominated work	Result	Ref.
2022	Grammy Awards	Best New Artist	Japanese Breakfast	Nominated	
2022	Grammy Awards	Best Alternative Music Album	Jubilee	Nominated	
2022	GLAAD Media Award	Outstanding Breakthrough Music Artist	Jubilee	Nominated	
2022	Libera Awards	Record of the Year	Jubilee	Won	
2022	Libera Awards	Best Alternative Rock Record	Jubilee	Won	
2022	Libera Awards	Breakthrough Artist/Release	Jubilee	Nominated	
2022	Libera Awards	Creative Packaging	Jubilee	Won	
2022	Libera Awards	Marketing Genius	Jubilee	Won	
2022	Libera Awards	Video of the Year	"Savage Good Boy"	Nominated	
2022	Libera Awards	Best Live/Livestream Act	"Be Sweet" at The Tonight Show Starring Jimmy Fallon	Nominated	
