= Alex G discography =

American musician

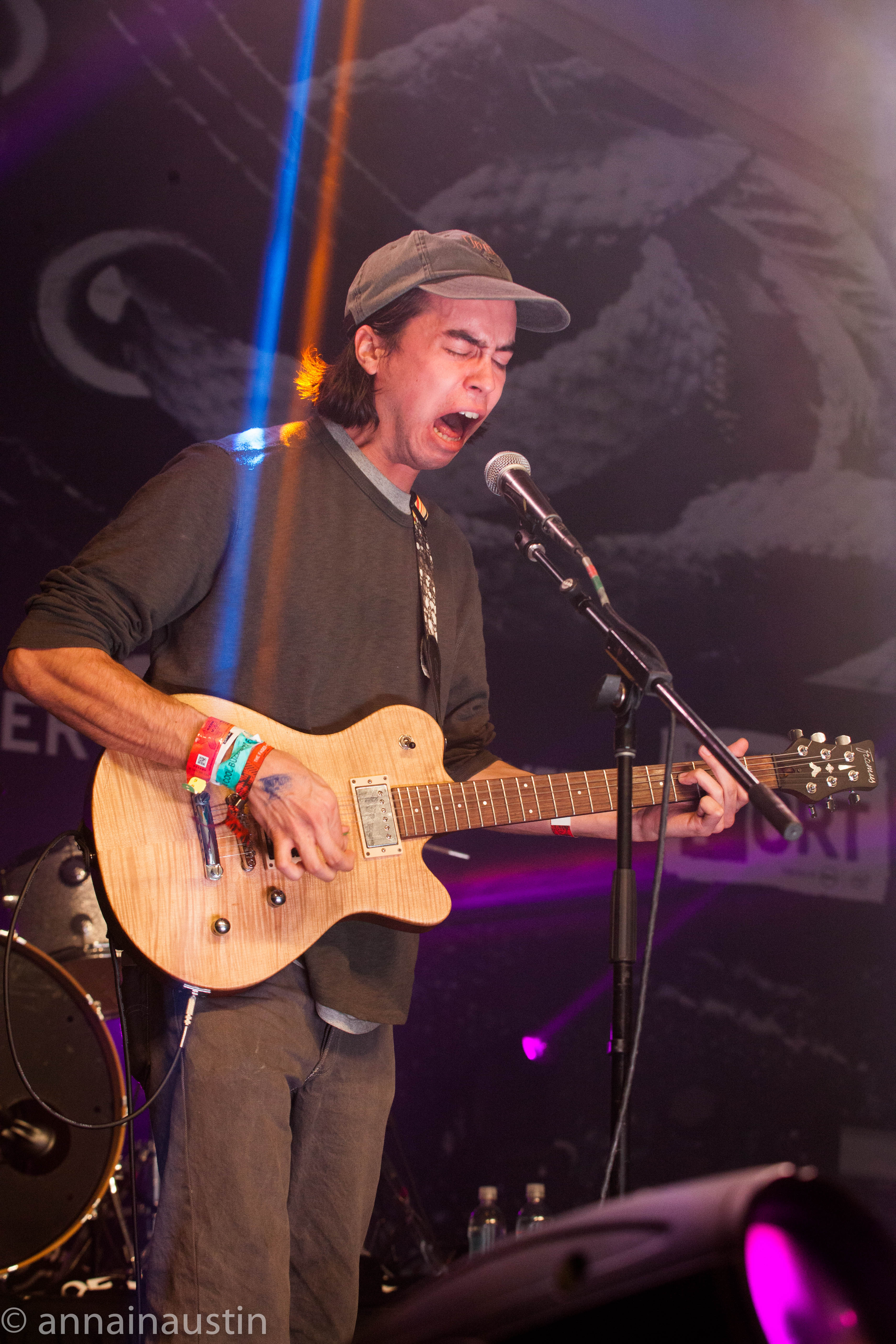
- Alex G performing at South by Southwest in 2015
- Studio albums: 10
- EPs: 4
- Soundtrack albums: 2
- Live albums: 3
- Singles: 30

American musician Alex G has released ten studio albums and four EPs, as well as three live albums and two soundtrack albums. His first four studio albums were self-released on the music-sharing website Bandcamp. His fifth album, DSU, was released on Orchid Tapes in 2014, and his subsequent releases have been with the label Domino Recording Company until 2025. He has also contributed to songs by various artists and bands including Julia Brown, Frank Ocean, Porches, Japanese Breakfast, Nothing, Lil Yachty, and Halsey.

== Albums ==
=== Studio albums ===
List of studio albums, with selected chart positions
Title	Album details	Peak chart positions					Certifications
Title	Album details	US	US Alt	US Curr.	US Heat	US Indie	Certifications
Winner	Released: July 4, 2011; Label: Self-released; Format: Digital download, streaming	—	—	—	—	—	
Race	Released: August 9, 2011 (Note: Giannascoli wrote and recorded Race during high school, but released it only after graduating in 2011. For this reason, the Bandcamp page of the album indicates January 1, 2010, as release date.) (Note: Remastered by Heba Kadry in 2020 and reissued in 2021.); Label: Self-released; Format: LP, digital download, streaming, cassette (Note: Released by Gold Soundz in 2013.)	—	—	—	—	—	
Rules	Released: January 15, 2012; Label: Self-released (Note: Remastered and reissued by Lucky Number on April 6, 2015.); Format: CD, LP, digital download, streaming, cassette (Note: Released by Birdtapes in September 2013.)	—	—	—	—	—	
Trick	Released: November 6, 2012; Label: Self-released; Format: CD, LP, digital download, streaming, cassette	—	—	—	—	—	BPI: Silver
DSU	Released: June 17, 2014; Label: Orchid Tapes; Format: CD, LP, digital download, streaming, cassette	—	—	—	—	—	
Beach Music	Released: October 9, 2015; Label: Domino; Format: CD, LP, digital download, streaming, cassette	—	—	—	9	—	
Rocket	Released: May 19, 2017; Label: Domino; Format: CD, LP, digital download, streaming, cassette	—	—	95	7	23	
House of Sugar	Released: September 13, 2019; Label: Domino; Format: CD, LP, digital download, streaming, cassette	—	25	39	5	16	
God Save the Animals	Released: September 23, 2022; Label: Domino; Format: CD, LP, digital download, streaming, cassette	144	16	9	3	23	
Headlights	Released: July 18, 2025; Label: RCA; Format: CD, LP, digital download, streaming, cassette	166	24	18	—	—	
"—" denotes a recording that did not chart or was not released in that territory.							

=== Live albums ===
List of live albums, with selected chart positions
Title	Album details	Peak chart positions		
Title	Album details	US Curr.	US Sales	SCO
Live at The Headroom	Released: October 9, 2015 (Note: Included in the deluxe edition of the Beach Music LP vinyl.); Label: Domino; Format: LP (Note: The tracks "Bug" and "Kicker" were included in the EP Spring 2016 Tour Compilation (released on Bandcamp) and made available for digital download and streaming.)	—	—	—
Live at Third Man Records	Released: June 15, 2018; Label: Third Man; Format: LP (Note: The track "Bobby" (distributed via SoundCloud) was officially uploaded online and made available for digital download and streaming.)	—	—	—
Live from Union Transfer	Released: June 30, 2023; Label: Domino; Format: LP	45	80	88
"—" denotes a recording that did not chart or was not released in that territory.

=== Soundtrack albums ===
List of soundtrack albums
Title	Album details
We're All Going to the World's Fair (Original Motion Picture Soundtrack)	Released: April 15, 2022; Label: Love in Winter, Milan; Format: LP, (Note: Released in occasion of Record Store Day on November 25, 2022.) digital download, streaming
I Saw the TV Glow (Original Motion Picture Score)	Released: May 16, 2024; Label: A24 Music; Format: Digital download, streaming

=== Compilation albums ===
List of compilation albums with notes
Title	Album details	Notes
Some Songs	Released: May 10, 2014; Label: Volante Discos; Format: Digital download, streaming, cassette	A compilation of songs recorded between 2010 and 2012.; Includes tracks from the EPs Easy and What Would Your Closest Friend Do? and from the albums Rules and Trick, plus single "Good".
C-Sides	Released: 2015 (Note: Copies were distributed at live performances during a concert tour.); Label: Self-released; Format: CD	An album consisting of 18 unreleased songs, sold on tour in 2015.

== Extended plays ==
List of extended plays
Title	Details
Easy	Released: August 21, 2011; Label: Self-released; Format: Digital download, streaming (Note: The track "I Wait for You" doesn't appear in the official Bandcamp track listing—and isn't therefore available for streaming anymore—since 2015, but is still included in the download.)
Paint	Released: September 9, 2013; Label: Self-released; Format: Digital download, streaming
Split 7" (with R.L. Kelly)	Released: September 24, 2013; Label: Birdtapes; Format: EP, digital download, streaming
Salt	Released: 2013; Label: Birdtapes (Note: Salt was published as a minor release since it wasn't directly intended for the Birdtapes label.); Format: Cassette

== Singles ==
=== As lead artist ===
List of singles, with selected chart positions
Title	Year	Peak chart positions		Album
Title	Year	US AAA	US TikTok	Album
"Sandy"	2011	—	—	Rules (Note: "Good" was included in compilation album Some Songs (2014) and—along with "Sandy"—in the 2015 remastered edition of Rules, as a bonus track. "Sandy" was reissued in 2022 featuring "Good" as B-side.)
"Good"	2011	—	—	Rules
"Lucy"	2013	—	—	Non-album singles
"Joy"	2013	—	—	Non-album singles
"Hollow"	2014	—	—	DSU
"Harvey"	2014	—	—	DSU
"Bug"	2015	—	—	Beach Music
"Salt"	2015	—	—	Beach Music
"Kicker"	2015	—	—	Beach Music
"Bobby"	2017	—	—	Rocket
"Witch"	2017	—	—	Rocket
"Proud"	2017	—	—	Rocket
"Brick"	2017	—	—	Rocket
"Sportstar" (solo or remix with Porches)	2017	—	—	Rocket
"Gretel"	2019	—	—	House of Sugar
"Hope"	2019	—	—	House of Sugar
"Southern Sky"	2019	—	—	House of Sugar
"Near"	2019	—	—	House of Sugar
"Treehouse" (Note: "Treehouse" was originally an unreleased song, having an instrumental version included in the compilation C-Sides (2015). After becoming popular on TikTok in 2020–21, it was uploaded to main audio streaming platforms on January 22, 2022. Official sources indicate January 17, 2011, as release date.) (featuring Emily Yacina)	2022	—	42	Non-album single
"Sarah"	2022	—	—	Trick
"Soaker"	2022	—	—	DSU
"End Song" (Note: Subtitled "(from "We're All Going to the World's Fair" Soundtrack)")	2022	—	—	We're All Going to the World's Fair (Original Motion Picture Soundtrack)
"Main Theme"	2022	—	—	We're All Going to the World's Fair (Original Motion Picture Soundtrack)
"Blessing"	2022	—	—	God Save The Animals
"Runner"	2022	34	—	God Save The Animals
"Cross the Sea"	2022	—	—	God Save The Animals
"Miracles"	2022	—	—	God Save The Animals
"Afterlife"	2025	8	—	Headlights
"June Guitar"	2025	—	—	Headlights
"Oranges"	2025	—	—	Headlights
"—" denotes a recording that did not chart or was not released in that territory.

=== As featured artist ===
Title	Year	Album
"Too Long Here" (Ryan Hemsworth featuring Alex G)	2015	Alone for the First Time
"April Ha Ha" (Nothing featuring Alex G)	2020	The Great Dismal

== Other charted songs ==
List of other charted songs
Title	Year	Peak chart positions		Album
Title	Year	US TikTok	US Lyr.	Album
"I Wait for You"	2011	15	—	Easy
"Break"	2014	—	7	Those Who Were Once Friends Are Now Fam
"—" denotes a recording that did not chart or was not released in that territory.

== Guest appearances ==
List of non-single guest appearances
Title	Year	Other artist	Album	Ref.
"Sloth"	2012	None	Mein Comp	
"Cold"	2013	None	420 Love Songs (First 40)	
"Molly"	2013	None	420 Love Songs (Second 40)	
"Trade"	2013	None	What Would Your Closest Friend Do? (Note: "Trade" was later included in the EP Split 7" (2013).)	
"Not So Tough"	2013	None	Winter Mixtape	
"Break"	2014	None	Those Who Were Once Friends Are Now Fam	
"Cards"	2014	None	Boring Ecstasy: The Bedroom Pop of Orchid Tapes	
"Kara"	2014	None	Alone	
"Sum Secret"	2014	None	Angeltown II	
"Change My Mind"	2015	None	Bonus Mix CD	
"I Was Here" (Note: Released under the name "Alan J".)	2016	None	Art Week 2016	
"July 27 2015"	2016	None	Radiating Light: Orchid Tapes & Friends	
"Leave the House"	2018	Porches	The House	
"Babylon"	2018	Oneohtrix Point Never	Love in the Time of Lexapro	

== Collaborations ==
List of musical collaborations
Title	Year	Artist	Credit(s)
Reverie	2011	Emily Yacina	Drums ("Far Away", "For Now")
"Too Slow"	2013	Emily Yacina	Instruments
Bloom	2013	Emily Yacina	Electric guitar, drums ("Glow")
Brown Horse	2014	R.L. Kelly	Drums ("The Great Big World"), guitar, keys ("I Cannot")
All Cold Everything	2014	Cold Foamers	Writing ("Always", "Rebecca"), recording, production
"Alright"	2014	R.L. Kelly	Drums
An Abundance of Strawberries	2016	Julia Brown	Writing, recording ("Possession (Full)" coda)
Endless	2016	Frank Ocean	Guitars ("U-N-I-T-Y", (Note: Giannascoli appears in the credits for "U-N-I-T-Y" only in the 2017 home video version of the film.) "Wither", "Slide on Me", "Rushes", "Higgs")
Blonde	2016	Frank Ocean	Guitars, arrangement ("Self Control", "White Ferrari")
Attic Space	2018	Fairy Godmother	Drums ("Intro", "Tell on Me")
Not Glitterer	2018	Glitterer	Production
Looking Through the Shades	2019	Glitterer	Production
Projections	2020	Tomberlin	Production
Ravening Iron	2020	Eternal Champion	Additional keys ("Ravening Iron")
Jubilee	2021	Japanese Breakfast	Production, rhodes, piano, synthesizers ("Savage Good Boy")
Lifesaver	2022	Snoozer	Keys ("Half Way Home")
Let's Start Here	2023	Lil Yachty	Writing ("Failure")
The Great Impersonator	2024	Halsey	Production ("Only Living Girl in LA", "The End", "Letter to God (1983)", "Hometown"), guitar ("Ego", "The End"), additional production ("Darwinism"), writing ("Only Living Girl in LA")
Lost Weekend	2026	Phoebe Bridgers	Production

== Music videos ==
List of music videos, showing year released, director(s) and album name
Title	Year	Director(s)	Album
"After Ur Gone"	2013	Linnea Nugent	DSU
"Sorry"	2014	Sirus F. Gahan	DSU
"Hollow"	2014	John Vizzone	DSU
"Harvey"	2014	Colin Acchione	DSU
"Bug"	2015	Micah Van Hove	Beach Music
"Kicker"	2015	John Vizzone	Beach Music
"Brite Boy"	2015	Elliot Bech	Beach Music
"Mud"	2016	Alex Giannascoli and Colin Acchione	Beach Music
"Bobby"	2017	Colin Acchione	Rocket
"Gretel"	2019	Zev Magasis	House of Sugar
"Hope"	2019	Alex Giannascoli and Madalyn Freeman	House of Sugar
"Southern Sky"	2019	Elliot Bech	House of Sugar
"In My Arms"	2019	Zev Magasis	House of Sugar
"Bad Man"	2019	Zev Magasis	House of Sugar
"Blessing"	2022	Zev Magasis	God Save The Animals
"Runner"	2022	Aldo Fisk	God Save The Animals
"Cross The Sea"	2022	Elliot Bech	God Save The Animals
"Immunity"	2023	Zev Magasis	God Save The Animals
"Afterlife"	2025	Charlotte Rutherford	Headlights
"June Guitar"	2025	Zev Magasis and MaKenna Greene	Headlights
