= Race =

Race, RACE or The Race may refer to:

- Race (taxonomy), an informal taxonomic classification within a species, generally within a subspecies
- Race (human categorization), classification of humans into groups based on physical traits and/or social relations
  - Historical race concepts, obsolete definitions of human racial groups
- Racing, a competition of speed

== Rapid movement ==
- Mill race, millrace, or millrun, the current of water that turns a water wheel, or the channel (sluice) conducting water to or from a water wheel
- Tidal race, a fast-moving tide passing through a constriction

== Arts, entertainment, and media ==
- Race (fantasy), classification of fictional species in fantasy fiction
  - Character race

=== Literature ===
- Race (play), a 2009 play by David Mamet
- The Race (Patterson novel), a 2007 novel by Richard North Patterson
- The Race (Allan novel), a 2014 novel by Nina Allan
- The Race, a 2011 novel by Clive Cussler
- The Race (Worldwar), fictional alien invaders in the works of Harry Turtledove
- Colonel Race, an Agatha Christie character

=== Film ===
- Race film, early films produced for an all-black audience
- Race (film series)
  - Race (2008 film), a Bollywood thriller
  - Race 2, a 2013 Bollywood action-thriller film sequel to the 2008 film
  - Race 3, a 2018 Bollywood action-thriller film sequel to Race 2
- The Race (1916 film), a silent film directed by George Melford
- The Race (2002 film) (Le raid), a French film starring Josiane Balasko
- Race (2007 film), an animated sci-fi film
- The Race, a 2009 film starring Colm Meaney
- Race (2011 film), a Malayalam thriller
- Race (2013 film), a Telugu film
- Race (2016 film), a film about African American athlete Jesse Owens
- Melting Pot (film), also known as Race, a 1998 feature film

=== Television ===
- The Race (TV series), a 2006 UK reality programme
- "The Race" (The Goodies)
- "The Race" (Joe 90)
- "The Race" (Plebs)
- "The Race" (Seinfeld)
- Race Bannon, a character in Jonny Quest

=== Games ===
- Race – The Official WTCC Game (2006), a computer game
- Race for the Galaxy (2007), a card game

=== Music ===
- The Race (band), an English indie rock band

==== Albums ====
- Race (Pseudo Echo album), 1988
- Race (Alex G album), 2010

==== Songs ====
- "The Race" (Tay-K song), 2017
- "The Race" (Wiz Khalifa song), 2011
- "The Race" (Yello song), 1988
- "The Race", by Arch Enemy from Will to Power, 2017
- "The Race", by Cajun Dance Party from The Colourful Life, 2008
- "The Race", by Coldplay (unreleased), 2014
- "The Race", by Thirty Seconds to Mars from Love, Lust, Faith and Dreams, 2013
- "The Race", by Warmen from First of the Five Elements, 2014
- "Race", by Prince from Come, 1994
- "Race", by Tiger from We Are Puppets, 1996
- "Race" by Alex G from the album of the same name, 2011

== Businesses and organizations ==
- Ferrari (stock ticker RACE), Italian car manufacturer
- Radio Amateur Civil Emergency Service, in the US, established in 1952 for wartime use
- RACE (Remote Applications in Challenging Environments), a robotics development center in the UK
- Racing Academy and Centre of Education (RACE), a jockey and horse-racing industry training centre in Kildare town in the Republic of Ireland
- Royal Automobile Club of Spain (Real Automóvil Club de España, RACE), an automobile association in Spain

== Science and technology ==
- RACE encoding, a syntax for encoding non-ASCII characters in ASCII
- Rapid amplification of cDNA ends, a technique in molecular biology
- Race condition, a computer programming error

== Other uses ==
- RACE (container) or Railways of Australia Container Express, a slightly wider version of the standard ISO shipping container
- Race (bearing), a part of a mechanical device
- Race (name), with a list of people bearing this name
- Race Street station, a light rail station in San Jose, California
- The Race (yachting race), round-the-world sailing competition that started on December 31, 2000
- Space Race, the competition between the United States and the Soviet Union for dominance in spaceflight capability
- Race, alternative term for an election, especially in the US

== See also ==
- Raceland (disambiguation)
