= Trick (Alex G album) =

Studio album by Alex G
- Released: November 6, 2012
- Recorded: c. 2011–2012 (Note: Giannascoli declared to have written album closer "Change" when he was 18, i.e. between February 2011 and February 2012. According to Lucky Number, Trick was written and recorded "a few months" after Rules, which was released in January 2012. Prior to DSU (2014), Giannascoli was used to take a rather short time for the making of albums.)
- Genre: Indie rock
- Length: 31:39 (Note: Based on the approximate length of the original tracks.)
- Label: Self-released; Bandcamp
- Producer: Alex G

Alex G chronology
Rules (2012)	Trick (2012)	DSU (2014)

Singles from Trick
- 1. "Sarah" Released: March 18, 2022

Trick is the fourth studio album by American musician Alex G. It was originally self-released through Giannascoli's Bandcamp page on November 6, 2012, and later reissued in a professionally mastered version via Lucky Number on April 6, 2015.

Along with Giannascoli's previous release, Rules (2012), Trick quickly made him gain popularity between Philadelphian independent artists, and has become one of his most successful and representative albums. Contemporary critics generally appreciated it for its dark and emotionally-touching themes of intimacy, nostalgia, and hope, surrounded by an eccentric aesthetic. The album was given further acclaim after its reissue in 2015, following DSU's success, and then in 2022, thanks to some songs such as "Mary" and "Sarah", which became viral on TikTok and Spotify.

On March 18, 2022, a reissue of Trick was released via Lucky Number as a bundle along with single "Sarah", containing the three bonus tracks added in the 2015 remastered edition of the album.

== Artwork ==
The album's cover is a photo featuring a German Shepherd running down the central aisle of St. Donato Roman Catholic Church, in Philadelphia, Pennsylvania. As Giannascoli explained, it was taken by his sister Rachel while attending the funeral of their paternal grandmother:

It was me and my sister and my family and we were at a funeral. We’re all filing out of the church and this crazy dog ran in. It was a German Shepherd, and it ran down the aisle and was going up and down the pews and stuff. Then it was running out and my sister luckily pulled out her phone and got that picture as it was running out of the church. It was crazy.

The owner of the dog is unknown. It was later referred to as stray.

== Critical reception ==
Professional ratings
Aggregate scores
Source	Rating
Metacritic	71/100
Review scores
Source	Rating
DIY	4/5 stars
The Line of Best Fit	8/10
Q	3/5 stars
Uncut	7/10

Trick generally met a positive response because of its experimental and 'psychedelic' elements. Colin Joyce of Beats Per Minute appreciated Alex G's mastered use of music to amplify emotional resonance rather than 'structural meaning', as well as his catchy and memorable melodies. Thanks to the support of a split with Californian artist R.L. Kelly, in 2013 Giannascoli won The Deli's reader's poll for Best Emerging Artist. He expressed his surprise to such notoriety:

I started the new album right after I put Trick out, so I didn’t feel any pressure, not knowing what a big deal Trick would be. I mean, I was just plodding along and then suddenly I started hearing people talking about Trick. So I guess it made me pay more attention to detail — all those parts on Trick where I fuck up, no one cared, but now I’m trying to perfect it.

Trick became more popular than Rules, released earlier in 2012, for it stood as a better synthesis of Giannascoli's eccentric and creative personality. French reviewers À Découvrir Absolument and EnvrAk lauded its ability to recall 90s rock music while adapting to other genres with multiple instruments. As it received further attention on account of DSU's release (2014) and its own reissue (2015), critics started to express diversified opinions; Trick's DIY and experimental style eventually led it to be deemed also overlooked and 'smothered'—as well as Giannascoli's previous Bandcamp releases. Q wrote "a little extra salt in his songwriting and [Giannascoli] could yet conjure up a classic". At the same time, Tamlin Magee of The Line of Best Fit claimed that "while there's distortion and feedback throughout, catchy hooks and considered melody naturally soar above the production". Sharon O'Connell in her review for Uncut described Trick as "less hazily fragmented and more tied to song structure [than DSU]". For Uproxx, Ian Cohen ranked it as Alex G's sixth best album—God Save the Animals (2022) being the latest release—and wrote "Trick was downright indulgent at 37 minutes, 16 songs and some of which were clearly larks or, dare I say, filler". KRUI-FM author Samuel Bowden called it "beautifully messy" and "a classic in Alex G’s catalog, if not an important record in indie music".

Aggregator Metacritic assigned Trick a weighted average score of 71 out of 100, based on 4 professional reviews, inticating "generally favorable reviews". Trick was compared to the works of artists such as Built to Spill, Coma Cinema, Pinback, J Mascis, Steely Dan, the Smashing Pumpkins, Nirvana, Starlight Mints, Sparklehorse, and The Brian Jonestown Massacre. Giannascoli's vocals were debated as well, with The Line of Best Fit reviewer Tamlin Magee affirming their unfitness compared to the instrumental performance, and stating at the same time that "each of the songs is endearing enough for this not to matter, and crucially, his vocal presence is never overbearing". On the other hand, Colin Joyce of Beats Per Minute described Giannascoli's one as a "developed songwriting voice"; KRUI-FM claimed it covers a crucial role in building the atmosphere: "Alex G’s voice is key". Both critics and fans gave particular attention to "Change", a song about the feeling of discomfort towards the passage of time—"something that everyone experiences", as Giannascoli explained.

== Track listing ==
All tracks are written by Alex Giannascoli.

Trick – Standard edition
No.	Title	Length
1.	"Memory"	2:50
2.	"Forever"	2:30
3.	"Animals"	2:53
4.	"String"	5:01
5.	"Advice"	2:40
6.	"People"	1:33
7.	"Whale"	1:20
8.	"Trick"	1:11
9.	"Kute"	1:17
10.	"So"	2:35
11.	"Mary"	3:16
12.	"Change"	2:07
13.	"Clouds"	2:26
Total length:		31:39

Trick – French edition (bonus track)
No.	Title	Length
1.	"Adam"	1:46
Total length:		33:25

Trick – 2015 remastered edition (bonus tracks)
No.	Title	Length
14.	"Adam"	1:48
15.	"Sarah"	2:56
16.	"16 Mirrors"	1:27
Total length:		37:44

Notes

- For the 2015 remastered edition the standard tracks underwent minor edits, causing their lengths to vary (except for "Animals", "People", and "Clouds"). The remastered tracks have a total length of 31:33, about 6 seconds shorter than the original album. Bonus track "Adam", originally included as opener in the 2014 French release, was given a longer outro as well.

Sample credits

- "Memory" contains in the background some lines from the Everybody Loves Raymond episode "Talk to Your Daughter", featuring the voices of Doris Roberts and Brad Garrett. The sample was provided by Molly Yochum.

== Personnel ==
Credits adapted from the album's liner notes.

Musicians

- Alex G – vocals (tracks 1–7, 9–12, 14–16)
- Jacob Colon – saxophone (2)
- John Heywood – bass (2)
- Emily Yacina – background vocals (5)

Technical

- Jason Mitchell – mastering

== Charts ==
Chart performance for Trick
Chart (2024)	Peak position
UK Independent Album Breakers (OCC)	5
UK Independent Albums (OCC)	32
UK Record Store (OCC)	4
US Indie Store Album Sales (Billboard)	3

== Certifications ==
Certifications for Trick
Region	Certification	Certified units/sales
United Kingdom (BPI)	Silver	60,000^{‡}
^{‡} Sales+streaming figures based on certification alone.

== Release history ==
Country	Date	Format(s)	Edition	Label	Ref.
Various	November 6, 2012	Digital download; streaming	Standard	Self-released; Bandcamp	
North America	2013 (Note: Even though the liner notes on the cassette do indicate November 6, 2012, as release date, Haze Tapes didn't dispatch any of Alex G's tapes until February 2013. Giannascoli's Bandcamp page started advertising the cassette only between May and September 2013. By May 2013, copies of the album had already been sold and delivered.)	Cassette	Standard	Haze Tapes	
France	May 19, 2014	CD; digital download; streaming	Bonus track	Kütu Folk	
Various	April 6, 2015	Remastered vinyl LP	Standard	Lucky Number	
Various	April 6, 2015	Remastered CD; digital download; streaming	Bonus tracks	Lucky Number	
Australia	July 3, 2015	Remastered CD	Bonus tracks	Spunk	
