= Snot (disambiguation) =

Snot is a slang term for nasal mucus.

Snot or SNOT may also refer to:

- Snot (band), an American hardcore punk band
- Snot (rapper), a rapper from Florida
- Snot Dudley, an American wrestler
- Snot, a character from the US television show American Dad!
- Sid Snot, an ageing biker character performed by Kenny Everett
- Snot, a character from the video game Earthworm Jim
- Snot, a song by American singer-songwriter Alex G, off of his album Beach Music, 2015
- Snots, a dog from the film National Lampoon's Christmas Vacation
- Snot, the Saxon chieftain for whom the city of Nottingham is originally named
- SNOT (studs not on top), a term used within the Lego fandom
