= Katie Dey =

Australian experimental pop musician

- Origin: Melbourne
- Genres: Experimental pop, psychedelia, bedroom pop, singer-songwriter
- Occupation: musician
- Labels: Orchid Tapes, Joy Void, Run for Cover

Katie Dey (born 1994) is an Australian experimental pop musician.

== Career ==
Dey released her first album, Asdfasdf, in 2015 with the label Orchid Tapes. Dey attracted the attention of Orchid Tapes founder Warren Hildebrand after Mat Cothran of Elvis Depressedly discovered Dey's blog. Pitchfork rated the album with a 7 out of 10. In 2016, Dey released her second full-length album, Flood Network, this time with the label Joy Void. Pitchfork gave the album a 7.8 out of 10 rating. In 2018, Dey collaborated on an album with musician Devi McCallion of Black Dresses, titled Some New Form of Life. In May 2019, Dey surprise released her third full-length album titled Solipsisters, on Run for Cover Records. Pitchfork rated the album a 7.9 out of 10.

In July 2020, Dey released her fourth full-length album titled Mydata, which received a 7.5 out of 10 from Pitchfork and was chosen as Album of the Week by Stereogum. Dey then released a sequel collaboration album to Some New Form of Life with Devi McCallion in September 2020 titled Magic Fire Brain. The album was also selected by Stereogum as Album of the Week upon its release. In January 2021, Dey released a Mydata remix album titled Urdata with collaborators including Laura Les, June Jones, Devi McCallion, and Ada Rook.

In January 2022, Dey independently released her fifth full-length album titled Forever Music, which received a 7.3 out of 10 from Pitchfork.

== Artistry ==
Dey's music has been characterized as "digitally warped" and has been noted especially for her use of "distinctive vocal effects" as well as by her "resourceful use of pitch-shifting and bizarre instrumental choices, for which she has been compared to indie rock/bedroom pop artist Alex G. Despite her use of glitchy digital effects and Synthesizers, she has been characterized as a singer-songwriter: Stereogum writer James Rettig writes about Mydata, “Take away the digitally fucked sonics and [her songs are] downright universal. She basically makes hyper-modern piano ballads, rooted in old songwriting traditions — a girl and a piano, trying to bang out some existential crisis."

Dey has related some of these stylistic choices to her status as a trans woman. In an interview with The Fader, she said pitch-shifting her vocals was originally "a way of relieving dysphoria and making my own music more palatable for me to listen to so that it didn't upset me". Her collaboration album Some New Form of Life marked the first time she released music with "totally unaffected" vocals, which she attributes to confidence resulting from her friendship with fellow trans woman Devi McCallion. Her album Solipsisters is written as an exploration of the relation between the soul and body and as a way of working through her personal conflicts in this area.

Dey is especially interested in exploring online relationships and online communities in her music. She explains in an interview that many of her friendships have come from the internet via her music, including her friendship with Toronto-based musician Devi McCallion. Dey's album Mydata is written, according to her, "explicitly about an internet relationship, which can be precisely as meaningful as a relationship that’s physical". The album features a music video for the lead single "dancing" filmed in the online virtual world Second Life which depicts a long-distance online relationship.

== Personal life ==
Dey is autistic.

She married multidisciplinary artist Luyuan Zhang in 2025.

== Discography ==
Studio albums

List of studio albums, with selected details
Title	Details
Asdfasdf	Released: 28 April 2015; Label: Orchid Tape (OCTO52); Format: digital, cassette
Flood Network	Released: 12 August 2016; Label: Joy Void (Joy Void #008), Orchid Tape (OCTO62); Format: CD, digital, cassette, LP
Some New Form of Life (with Devi McCallion)	Released: 7 November 2018; Label: blacksquares; Format: digital
Solipsisters	Released: 31 May 2019; Label: Run for Cover (RFC194); Format: digital, cassette, LP
Mydata	Released: 24 July 2020; Label: Run for Cover (RFC213); Format: digital, cassette, LP
Magic Fire Brain (with Devi McCallion)	Released: 13 September 2020; Label: blacksquares; Format: digital
Forever Music	Released: 28 January 2022; Label: Katie Dey; Format: digital
Never Falter Hero Girl	Released: 27 October 2023; Label: Katie Dey; Format: digital
Universal Will	Released: 6 November 2026; Label: Katie Dey; Format: digital

EPs

List of eps, with selected details
Title	Details
The Kraken	Released: 3 October 2022; Label: Katie Dey; Format: digital

Remix albums

List of remix albums, with selected details
Title	Details
Urdata	Released: 29 January 2021; Label: Run for Cover; Format: digital

Compilations

List of compilations, with selected details
Title	Details
anomalies	Released: 7 March 2025; Label: Katie Dey; Format: digital

== Awards and nominations ==
=== Music Victoria Awards ===
The Music Victoria Awards are an annual awards night recognising Victorian music. They commenced in 2006.

Year	Nominee / work	Award	Result	Ref.
2023	Katie Dey	Arts Access Amplify Award	Won	
