= Ghost Orchard =

American lo-fi musician

Ghost Orchard is the stage name of American lo-fi musician Samuel Jacob Hall. Hall is from Grand Rapids, Michigan.

== History ==
Hall began making music when he was in high school. In 2015, he self-released an album titled Poppy, before being re-released in 2016 by the record label Orchid Tapes. Hall released his second full-length album, Bliss, in 2016 through Orchid Tapes. In 2019, Hall released his third full-length album on Orchid Tapes titled Bunny.

== Influences ==
Hall cites Ricky Eat Acid, Katie Dey, Spencer Radcliffe, Blithe Field, Foxes In Fiction, and Alex G as influences.

== Discography ==
Studio albums

- Poppy (self-released, 2015; Orchid Tapes, 2016)
- Bliss (2016, Orchid Tapes)
- Bunny (2019, Orchid Tapes)
- invisible string (2022, Winspear)
- rainbow music (2022, Winspear)
