= Wished Bone =

American musician

Wished Bone is the stage name of American musician Ashley Rhodus. Rhodus has collaborated with a cast of rotating characters and projects.

== History ==
Wished Bone released their debut EP, Pseudio Recordings in 2015. It was included as the #2 Best Bandcamp release of 2015 on factmag. Rhodus released their first full length album in May 2018 titled Cellar Belly, which was recorded, produced and included performances by the band Bleach Day, in Burlington, Vermont. After the release of Cellar Belly, Wished Bone toured the United States extensively, often performing in living rooms and other DIY spaces. They also performed larger tours with acts including RL Kelly, Spencer Radcliffe and TV Girl. Wished Bone's third album, Sap Season, was released in November 2019.
