= Dragonchaser =

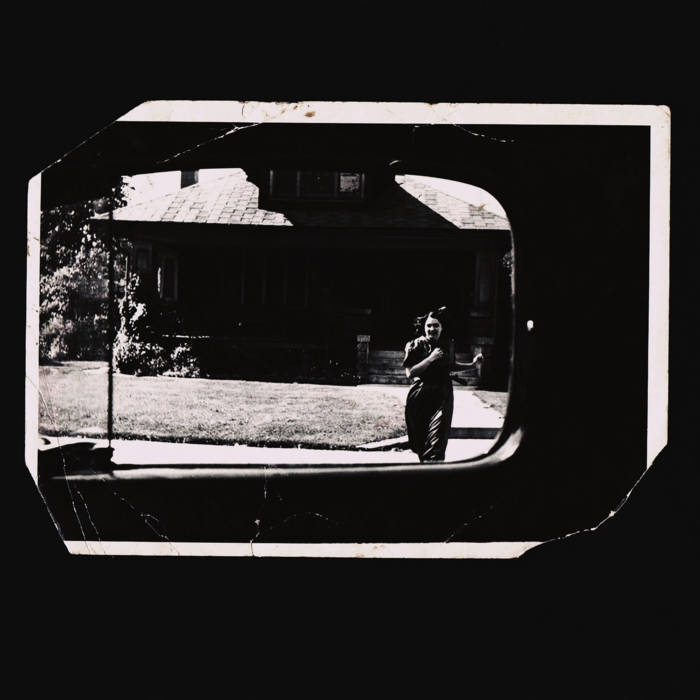

Studio album by Fog Lake
- Released: February 17, 2017
- Recorded: February – October 2016
- Genre: Slowcore, lo-fi
- Length: 33:07
- Label: Orchid Tapes
- Producer: Aaron Powell

Fog Lake chronology
Victoria Park (2015)	Dragonchaser (2017)	Inference 3 (2017)

Dragonchaser is the fourth full-length studio album from lo-fi experimental project Fog Lake. It was released February 17, 2017 on cassette format through Orchid Tapes. The album features guest contributions from Jen King (Family Video) and Home Alone.

== Background ==
After the release of 2015's Victoria Park (which was also released through Orchid Tapes), Newfoundland native Aaron Powell began work on Dragonchaser, which was recorded in both the city of St John's and Glovertown, Newfoundland and Labrador (Powell's hometown) respectively. Powell described the record as having recurring themes of "self medication and habits we all have to keep ourselves sane." The album spawned three singles, "Rattlesnake", "Side Effects" and "Push". It received coverage from SPIN, Stereogum, Tiny Mix Tapes and VICE.

== Track listing ==
1. "Novocaine" – 4:21
2. "Tolerance" – 2:11
3. "Rattlesnake" – 4:06
4. "Kerosene" – 3:00
5. "Breaking Over Branches" – 2:56
6. "Strung Back Around" – 2:47
7. "Medicine Road" – 1:44
8. "Side Effects" – 2:07
9. "Roswell" – 2:33
10. "Oak Island" – 2:06
11. "Push" – 3:02
12. "Spectrogram" – 2:16

== Personnel ==
Fog Lake

- Aaron Powell – music, lyrics, recording
- Michael Hansford – backing vocals (track 1)
- Kenney Purchase – synth (tracks 2, 3, 10, 18)
- David Aaron Mitchell – bass (tracks 1, 6, 10, 12)

Additional personnel

- Jen King – backing vocals (track 5)
- Home Alone – vocals, guitar (track 11)
- Warren Hildebrand – mastering
