= Trillium Killer =

Studio album by Foxes in Fiction
- Released: October 18, 2019
- Recorded: 2017–2019
- Genre: Bedroom pop, lo-fi, indie pop, dream pop
- Length: 45:19
- Label: Orchid Tapes

Trillium Killer is the third album by Foxes in Fiction, released October 18, 2019, on Orchid Tapes.

== Background ==
The album was written and recorded between 2017 and 2019 in New York City.

"Antibody" was written about the liberating effects of PrEP drugs for sexually active queer people due to the anxiety around HIV.

"Rush to Spark" is about mental illness, and the feeling of relief that can come with prescription medications while also acknowledging the strain that having a mental illness can put on loved ones during periods of mental instability.

== Track listing ==
All tracks are written by Warren Hildebrand.

No.	Title	Length
1.	"Ontario Sunshine"	2:46
2.	"A Softer World"	4:11
3.	"Extinguisher"	4:31
4.	"Rush to Spark"	4:57
5.	"Say Yes to Violence"	6:05
6.	"Ontario Sunshine Pt. 2"	2:54
7.	"Antibody"	3:20
8.	"Summer of The Gun"	7:17
9.	"Trillium Killer"	4:48
10.	"Second Chances / Vantablack"	4:27
Total length:		45:19

== Personnel ==
Credits adapted from Bandcamp.

Musicians

- Warren Hildebrand
- Eric Littmann — drums, synthesizers
- Olive Jun — synthesizers, programmed strings
- Dijon Duenas — tremolo vocals (track 1)
- Emily Reo — omnichord
- Jake Falby — violin
- Oliver Hill — violin
- Hillary James — cello
- Athylia Paremski — cello

Technical and design

- Warren Hildebrand — recording, mixing, additional layout design
- Rafael Anton Irisarri — mastering (at Black Knoll Studio)
- Olive Jun, Gabriel Brenner, Eric Littmann — mixing consultation
- Emily Yacina — vocal harmony writer (track 2)
- Austin Johnson — cover photograph
- Casey Jargo — cover design
