= Headlights (Alex G album) =

Studio album by Alex G
- Released: July 18, 2025
- Studios: Philadelphia, Pennsylvania; New York
- Length: 40:52
- Label: RCA
- Producers: Alex G; Jacob Portrait

Alex G chronology
I Saw the TV Glow (Original Motion Picture Score) (2024)	Headlights (2025)

Singles from Headlights
- 1. "Afterlife" Released: May 29, 2025; 2. "June Guitar" Released: June 27, 2025; 3. "Oranges" Released: July 16, 2025

Headlights is the tenth studio album by American musician Alex G, released on July 18, 2025 on RCA Records. Marking his major-label debut, the album was co-produced by Alex G and Unknown Mortal Orchestra bass guitarist Jacob Portrait, and was preceded by three singles, "Afterlife", "June Guitar", and "Oranges".

== Background ==
Headlights consists of "absurd twists and mundane milestones", influenced by Americana music similarly to his previous studio album, God Save the Animals (2022). The album continues the musical narrative characteristic of his work and draws influence from various artists, including Neil Young, Elliott Smith and Lucinda Williams. A press release noted that Alex G "revisits the reality-bending terrain that has made him both a beloved artist and an unassuming cultural figure".

== Recording ==
The album was co-produced by Alex G and Unknown Mortal Orchestra bass guitarist Jacob Portrait, who had worked with Giannascoli on his previous two studio albums, God Save the Animals (2022) and House of Sugar (2019). The majority of the album's instrumentation was recorded solely by Alex G, with contributions from his partner and regular collaborator Molly Germer (violin, backing vocals), alongside Carolina Diazgranados (cello, backing vocals), Hannah Nicholas (viola, backing vocals), Veronica Jurkiewicz (viola), Carlos Santiago (violin) and Justin Yoder (cello).

Alex G's longtime backing band – Sam Acchione (guitar), John Heywood (bass) and Tom Kelly (drums) – appear on the album's closing track, "Logan Hotel (Live)". The song was recorded "around a piano at the downtown Philadelphia hotel," with Alex G noting: "They’re amazing musicians, and so what they’re bringing to the song, it’s special and I am trying to capture that. And [sic] I want them on the album because they’re my people."

== Release ==
Having parted ways with Domino Recording Company after nearly ten years, the album marks his first release under RCA Records. The lead single, "Afterlife"—described as a "pleasant meditation on growing up" with a production style reminiscent of "Maggie May" (1971) and the drumming of Max Weinberg—was released alongside the album announcement on May 29. Its release was accompanied by a music video directed by Charlotte Rutherford. He released the album's second single, "June Guitar", on June 27, 2025.

Alex G is set to promote the record by touring with British musician Nilüfer Yanya across the United Kingdom and the United States.

== Critical reception ==
Professional ratings
Aggregate scores
Source	Rating
AnyDecentMusic?	8.0/10
Metacritic	83/100
Review scores
Source	Rating
AllMusic	3.5/5 stars
Clash	8/10
Exclaim!	7/10
The Guardian	5/5 stars
The Line of Best Fit	6/10
NME	4/5 stars
Pitchfork	8.5/10
Rolling Stone	4/5 stars
The Skinny	4/5 stars
Slant Magazine	4.5/5 stars

According to the review aggregator Metacritic, Headlights received "universal acclaim" based on a weighted average score of 83 out of 100 from 15 critic scores.

The Guardian gave a positive review, with writer Rachel Aroesti wrote, "The album peaks with the seemingly totally analogue Real Thing: a simply and addictively beautiful tune built around a pan flute and a witty riff on the titular romantic cliche. Giannascoli may have found a middle ground, but he's nowhere near the middle of the road". Pitchfork writer Ian Cohen wrote "Alex G upgrades to hi-fi dad rock and sails home with a major label debut worthy of all time indie-graduations". Rolling Stone writer Simon Vozick-Levinson wrote "Whether you've been riding with him for years or you're thinking of joining up today, Headlights is an album that won't make you regret that choice".

The Line of Best Fit gave a mixed review, with writer John Amen commenting, "Headlights represents a flirtation with commercialized approaches, with suburbanism, with, dare we say, the banal". He concluded, "Given Alex's impressive record, it's not a stretch to imagine that going forward, he'll find a way to better reconcile the predictable and unexpected, the cliché and seminal, the well-worn and just-discovered. We can hope that with subsequent work, he'll more thoroughly access the magic we've come to associate with his transportive songs and deft production style".

== Track listing ==
All tracks are written by Alex Giannascoli.

Headlights track listing
No.	Title	Length
1.	"June Guitar"	3:52
2.	"Real Thing"	3:18
3.	"Afterlife"	3:30
4.	"Beam Me Up"	3:28
5.	"Spinning"	2:33
6.	"Louisiana"	4:11
7.	"Bounce Boy"	2:00
8.	"Oranges"	2:52
9.	"Far and Wide"	3:49
10.	"Headlights"	4:55
11.	"Is It Still You in There?"	2:51
12.	"Logan Hotel" (live)	3:33
Total length:		40:52

== Personnel ==
Credits adapted from Tidal.

Musicians
- Molly Germer – background vocals (5, 8, 9, 11); strings, violin (5, 9)
- Carolina Diazgranados – background vocals (5, 9, 11), cello (5, 9)
- Hannah Nicholas – background vocals (5, 9, 11), viola (5, 9)
- Carlos Santiago – violin (5, 9)
- Justin Yoder – cello (9)
- Veronica Jurkiewicz – viola (9)
- Samuel Acchione – acoustic guitar, background vocals, electric guitar (12)
- John Heywood – bass (12)
- Tom Kelly – drums (12)

Production and engineering

- Alex G – production (all tracks), engineering (track 4)
- Jacob Portrait – production. mixing (all tracks); engineering (1, 3–11)
- Eric Bogacz – engineering (1–6, 8–11)
- Matthew Ticcino – engineering (2, 4, 5, 10)
- Kieran Ferris – engineering (7, 10), engineering assistance (12)
- Thomas Kelly – engineering (7, 10)
- Cody Cichowski – engineering (9)
- Shubham Mondal – engineering assistance (1, 3–11)
- Alex Cosenza – engineering assistance (9)
- Harrison Fore – engineering (12)
- Heba Kadry – mastering

== Charts ==
Chart performance for Headlights
Chart (2025)	Peak position
Scottish Albums (Official Charts)	32
US Billboard 200	166
US Top Rock & Alternative Albums (Billboard)	44
