= New Alhambra =

New Alhambra may refer to:

- 2300 Arena, formerly known as New Alhambra Arena, in Philadelphia, Pennsylvania
- A 2015 album by Elvis Depressedly
