= St. Donato Roman Catholic Church (Philadelphia) =

- St. Donato Roman Catholic Church
- 39.9695°N 75.2491°W
- Location: Philadelphia, Pennsylvania
- Country: United States
- Denomination: Catholic
- Website: http://www.parishesonline.com/Scripts/HostedSites/Org.asp?ID=7103

Administration
- Archdiocese: Archdiocese of Philadelphia
- Parish: Personal (Italian) Parish

St. Donato Roman Catholic Church, founded in 1910, is a Catholic parish in Overbrook, Philadelphia, Pennsylvania, in the Archdiocese of Philadelphia. The parish is still a national parish within the archdiocese for Italian Americans. The pastor was the late Rev. Ferdinand Buccafurni. About 650 families are registered, with the total congregation numbering around 1,300.The church has since closed down in 2020 during the COVID-19 pandemic.

Attached to the parish are a school and convent. St. Donato School enrolls 249 children. It is staffed by one Missionary Sister of the Sacred Heart and 16 lay faculty. The Missionary Sisters of the Sacred Heart convent was established by Mother Cabrini while she was based in Philadelphia.

== History ==
St. Donato drew its name from the town of San Donato Val di Comino, Italy, from which many of the residents of the Overbrook-Haddington area had immigrated. The parish celebrates the feast of St. Donato and of St. Frances X. Cabrini on the first Sunday of June. The celebration opens the annual carnival and the feast of Mother Cabrini was added to the celebration of St. Donato because she personally established the school and worshipped in the lower Church, and her Sisters remain active with the parish.

In 2013 the Archdiocese announced that the St. Donato congregation was merging into Our Lady of Lourdes Church. Members of the community unsuccessfully petitioned for the congregation to remain open. St. Donato, as of 2013, is to be used periodically for church services. Our Lady of Lourdes has the parish records.

St. Donato is also known as the church that was featured in the album cover for Trick by indie singer-songwriter Alex G.

== Education ==
St. Donato had its own parish school. Later the designated school was St. Frances Cabrini Regional School, Established in 2012 by the merger of Our Lady of Blessed Sacrement and St. Donato. The Cabrini school remained in operation after the end of the congregation.

== Notable parishioners ==
- Louis A. DeSimone – served as an Auxiliary bishop of the Archdiocese of Philadelphia from 1981 to 1997
- Edward T. Hughes – served as the Auxiliary bishop of the Roman Catholic Diocese of Metuchen, New Jersey from 1986 to 1997
- Joseph A. Pepe – serves as the second and current Bishop of Las Vegas

== See also ==
- Roman Catholic Archdiocese of Philadelphia
