= Victoria Park (album) =

Studio album by Fog Lake
- Released: June 30, 2015
- Recorded: September 2014 – June 2015
- Genre: Singer-songwriter, lo-fi
- Length: 30:20
- Label: Orchid Tapes
- Producer: Aaron Powell

Fog Lake chronology
Virgo Indigo (2014)	Victoria Park (2015)	Dragonchaser (2017)

Victoria Park is the third full-length studio album from lo-fi experimental music project Fog Lake. Entirely self-produced by Aaron Powell in both his parents' home and his apartment in St John's, Newfoundland, the album was released June 30, 2015 on cassette format through Orchid Tapes.

== Background ==
Upon garnering a larger following after 2014's Virgo Indigo and 2013's Farther Reaches and working with cassette-based DIY labels Birdtapes and Orchid Tapes, Powell worked on Victoria Park in both the city of St John's and Glovertown, Newfoundland. Heavily featuring piano-styled folk songs, it mostly abandons the ambient, dream-pop songs that accumulated Virgo Indigo for a more singer-songwriter like approach. The album takes its title from the park located in downtown St. John's in which Powell "spent two years as its neighbor". It spawned one single Bury My Dead Horses and a music video for the song Shanty Town which was produced by California-based filmmaker Tyler T. Williams.

== Track listing ==
1. "Renegade" – 2:08
2. "Andy" – 1:47
3. "Shanty Town" – 2:29
4. "Antidote" – 2:17
5. "Victoria Park" – 3:00
6. "Running Out Fast" – 1:58
7. "No Innocents (Bad Moon)" – 2:47
8. "Autumn 1998" – 2:50
9. "Disposable Comatose" – 1:22
10. "Bury My Dead Horses" – 2:55
11. "Midnight Cross" – 2:43
12. "Dog Years" – 4:00

== Personnel ==
Fog Lake

- Aaron Powell – music, lyrics, recording
- Kenney Purchase – synth (tracks 3, 6, 11, 12)

Additional personnel

- Warren Hildebrand – mastering
