= Fog Lake =

Canadian singer-songwriter

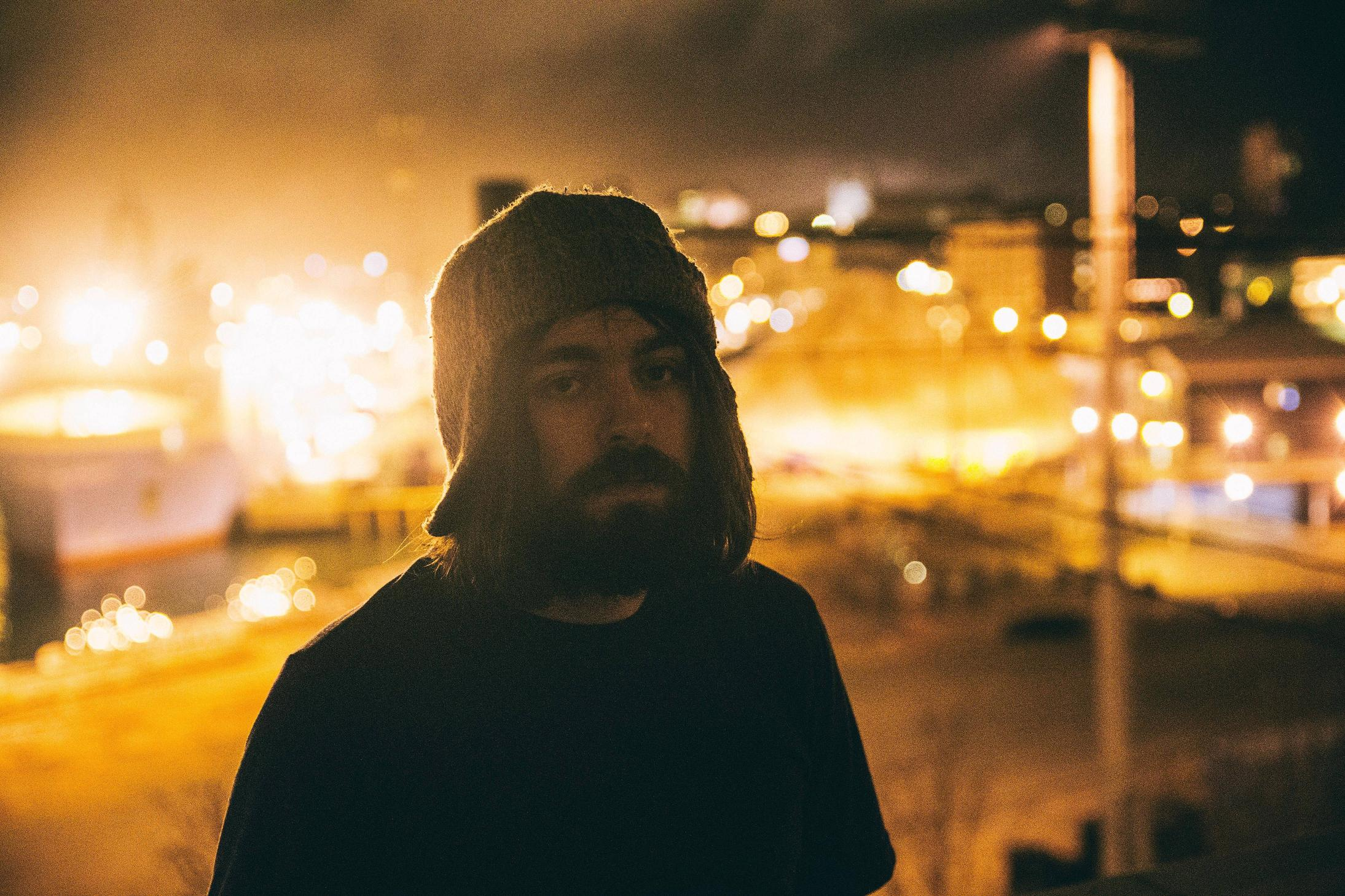
- Fog Lake in May 2016

Background information
- Also known as: Farewell, Alaska
- Born: Aaron Richard Powell; July 26, 1993 (age 33); Glovertown, Newfoundland, Canada
- Genres: Indie rock; indie folk; lo-fi; slowcore; ambient
- Years active: 2012–present
- Labels: Orchid Tapes; Dog Knights Productions
- Website: www.foglake.ca

Aaron Powell (born July 26, 1993), known professionally as Fog Lake, is a Canadian singer-songwriter. Powell began writing and recording songs in his hometown of Glovertown, Newfoundland. In 2014, he moved from cassette label Birdtapes to become part of the New York City-based label Orchid Tapes. Powell's recordings have been described as "a complex collage of nebulous angst and heartfelt nostalgia".

== History ==
Powell began experimenting with writing music during his high-school years in Glovertown, Newfoundland. The project began as ambient experiments, sampling and covers to "highly introspective, original recordings". Powell's music is crafted in DIY format, on shoestring budgets.

Powell's first release was a compilation entitled There's a Spirit, There's a Soul, composed of pop/ambient songs recorded in high school. The project began to develop a following after the release of Fog Lake's first full-length album, Farther Reaches, which was released independently in January 2013. Powell released the EP Holy Cross in June 2013 via Birdtapes. Powell then followed up Farther Reaches with a second full-length record, Virgo Indigo, released February 2014. It received coverage from websites such as The Fader and No Fear of Pop. Powell continued to produce self-produced, DIY records such as Victoria Park in 2015 and Dragonchaser in 2017, both being released strictly on cassette format through Orchid Tapes, receiving coverage from Stereogum, SPIN, VICE and also touring with emo indie-rock Foxing (band).

The track "Push" by Fog Lake was sampled in the single "Woda Księżycowa" by Polish music producer Kubi Producent, featuring bambi, Fukaj, and sticxr. The song became the most streamed track on Spotify in Poland in 2024 and achieved diamond certification. The single appears on Kubi Producent’s album Sen, którego nigdy nie miałem and significantly contributed to introducing Fog Lake’s work to Polish audiences.

== Recent work ==
Victoria Park, the third full-length album from Powell was released on 30 June 2015 in both digital and physical formats. The album (along with Powell's previous work) can be downloaded for free or pay-what-you-can via Bandcamp. Fog Lake then released Dragonchaser on February 17, 2017, via Orchid Tapes, along with a self-released EP Inference 3, a reworking of demos previously released in 2012. Powell released his fifth full-length entitled Captain through Dog Knights Records on July 5, 2018.

In April 2021, Powell released Tragedy Reel via Orchid Tapes. In March 2022, he uploaded Piano Songs under the moniker "Farewell, Alaska", an ambient instrumental project, on Bandcamp, with a wider release following on March 10. In May 2023, Powell surprise-released Midnight Society via Bandcamp, later making it available on streaming services. In August 2023, he was featured on the song "Canine Teeth" by Orchid Mantis. In May 2024, Powell released Dream Death as Farewell, Alaska. In November of 2026, Powell released his newest full-length album entitled 'Hollowbody'.

== Discography ==
=== Studio albums ===
- Farther Reaches (2013)
- Virgo Indigo (2014)
- Victoria Park (2015)
- Dragonchaser (2017)
- Captain (2018)
- Tragedy Reel (2021)
- Midnight Society (2023)
- Hollowbody (2026)

=== EPs ===
- Inference (III) (2012)
- Holy Cross (2013)
- Inference 3 (2017)
- Fog Lake / Euphoria Again (2018)
- Carousel (2018)

=== Compilations ===
- There's a Spirit, There's a Soul (2012)

=== Featured ===
- Précis (2018)
- Canine Teeth (2023)
