= Ontario Gothic =

Studio album by Foxes in Fiction
- Released: September 23, 2014
- Recorded: 2011–2014
- Genre: Bedroom pop, lo-fi, indie pop, dream pop
- Length: 31:44
- Label: Orchid Tapes

Ontario Gothic is the second album by Foxes in Fiction, released September 23, 2014, on Orchid Tapes.

== Background ==
Hildebrand centered the album around loss. His younger brother died in 2008, and the album is dedicated to Caitlin Amanda Morris, who died in 2010.

The album was recorded between 2011 and 2014 across New York, Toronto, London, and Portland.

== Critical reception ==
Pitchfork gave the album 6.3/10, with reviewer Ian Cohen writing, "Ontario Gothic is certainly part of a great story; but as a perfectly satisfying half hour of modest and common dream-pop, it's not much of a story on its own".

== Track listing ==
All tracks are written by Warren Hildebrand.

No.	Title	Length
1.	"March 2011"	4:05
2.	"Into The Fields"	5:47
3.	"Glow (v079)"	5:17
4.	"Shadow's Song"	3:58
5.	"Ontario Gothic"	5:25
6.	"Amanda"	1:49
7.	"Altars"	5:21
Total length:		31:44

== Personnel ==
Credits adapted from Bandcamp.

Musicians

- Warren Hildebrand
- Owen Pallett — violin (tracks 1, 2, 4, 5)
- Ansel Cohen — cello (tracks 4, 6)
- Beau Sorensen — piano (track 1)
- Rachel Levy — vocals (track 7)
- Caroline White — vocals (track 7)
- Sam Ray — vocals (track 7)

Technical

- Warren Hildebrand — mixing and recording
- Andrew Sardinha — mastering
