= Mister Lies =

American electronic musician, record producer and artist

- Birth name: Nick Zanca
- Genres: Electronic, experimental, ambient
- Occupation(s): Musician, producer
- Years active: 2012–present
- Labels: Orchid Tapes, Lefse
- Website: nickzanca.com

Mister Lies is a musical project started in 2012 by American electronic musician, record producer and multimedia artist Nick Zanca. The project, named after a minor character in Tony Kushner's play Angels in America, was established when Zanca moved to Illinois to attend school at Columbia College Chicago in pursuit of a playwriting degree and started making music in his dorm room with Ableton.

His debut release, the Hidden Neighbors EP, was self-released anonymously on his Bandcamp account in February 2012. His first full-length album, Mowgli, was released by Lefse Records in February 2013. The debut album was recorded at his parents' lake house in Ludlow, Vermont, and was inspired by the works of Rudyard Kipling. It also featured vocals from Exitmusic's Aleksa Palladino. In May 2014, Zanca announced via his Twitter that Brooklyn-based label Orchid Tapes would release his second album, Shadow, later in the year.

His music is a blend of ambient pop and EDM and has been compared to "1990s trip-hop" by Pitchfork Media, who called his music a "steadily building velvet sound, the kind that you want to wrap yourself in." He has opened up for The xx, Jessie Ware, Xiu Xiu, Young Galaxy and XXYYXX.

Zanca has cited Burial, Grouper, Portishead, Trent Reznor, Steve Reich and Oneohtrix Point Never as his musical influences.

== Personal life ==
Zanca is queer.

== Discography ==
Mister Lies discography, as adapted from Discogs and Bandcamp.

=== Singles ===
- "Flood You/Medusa" (2014)
- "Magichour" with KNOWER (2013)
- "Dionysian/Waveny" (2012)
- "I Walk" with Jessica Blanchet (2012)

=== Albums ===
- Mowgli (2013, Lefse Records)
- Shadow (2014, Orchid Tapes)
- Mister Lies (2019, self-released)

=== EPs ===
- Mass EP (2012), collaboration with Different Sleep [self-released]
- Hidden Neighbors EP (2012) [self-released]
- Flood You/Medusa EP
