= Blue Suicide =

Studio album by Coma Cinema
- Released: March 15, 2011
- Recorded: 2010
- Genre: Indie pop; bedroom pop
- Length: 35:52
- Label: Fork and Spoon

Coma Cinema chronology
Stoned Alone (2010)	Blue Suicide (2011)	Posthumous Release (2013)

Professional ratings
Review scores
Source	Rating
Pitchfork	7.2/10

Blue Suicide is the third studio album by American indie pop band Coma Cinema. The album was released on March 15, 2011, on Fork and Spoon Records.

== Background and recording ==
Blue Suicide is the third album of the one-man band Coma Cinema, and was recorded on a limited budget.

== Reception ==
The album received mostly positive reviews from critics. Zach Kelly of Pitchfork gave the album a score of 72/100, calling it "ambitious and arresting". Alex Young of Consequence gave the album a "B" rating, describing it as "gelatinous sorrow, powdered with ambiance, and riddled with the fruits of every rendezvous gone awry."

== Track listing ==
All tracks are written by Mathew Lee Cothran.

Blue Suicide track listing
No.	Title	Length
1.	"Business as Usual"	3:10
2.	"Hell"	1:21
3.	"Greater Vultures"	3:15
4.	"Lindsey"	1:49
5.	"Desolation's Plan"	1:33
6.	"Caroline, Please Kill Me"	1:50
7.	"Wondering"	2:28
8.	"Her Sinking Sun"	2:33
9.	"Crystal Ball Broken"	1:42
10.	"Gentlewoman"	2:17
11.	"Whatevering"	2:29
12.	"Eva Angelina"	4:14
13.	"Wrecked"	1:40
14.	"Blue Suicide"	2:36
15.	"Tour All Winter"	2:56
Total length:		35:52
