= Posthumous Release =

Studio album by Coma Cinema
- Released: June 11, 2013
- Genre: Indie pop; bedroom pop
- Length: 28:03
- Label: Fork and Spoon
- Producer: Brad Petering

Coma Cinema chronology
| Blue Suicide (2011) | Posthumous Release (2013) | Loss Memory (2017) |

Professional ratings
Review scores
| Source | Rating |
|---|---|
| Pitchfork | 6.1/10 |
| Paste | 8.9/10 |

Posthumous Release is the fourth studio album by American indie pop band Coma Cinema. The album was released on June 11, 2013, on Fork and Spoon Records. According to discogs: "Posthumous Release contains small, quietly desperate music, where Mat Cothran proves adept at finding the minute differences between a sigh, a shrug, and a sulk. These songs are minimal in every aspect, his flat, sullen voice at the front of mousey, sparse arrangements, all acoustic strums and brushed snares." And According to the label, Fork and Spoons records: "Posthumous Release is a testament to what you can survive with the help of those that love you. It is not a record about pain or misery, but a record about loving everything and letting everything love you. How strange and how perfect survival can be."

== Track listing ==
All tracks are written by Mathew Lee Cothran, except where noted.

Posthumous Release track listing
| No. | Title | Writer(s) | Length |
|---|---|---|---|
| 1. | "White Trash VHS" | | 3:16 |
| 2. | "She Keeps it Alive" | | 1:57 |
| 3. | "Bailey Jay" | | 2:26 |
| 4. | "Lee (Columbine High Harmony)" | | 1:49 |
| 5. | "Satan Made a Mansion" | | 2:06 |
| 6. | "Partners in Crime" | | 2:52 |
| 7. | "Burn a Church" | | 3:39 |
| 8. | "Virgin Veins" | | 2:36 |
| 9. | "Survivor's Guilt" | | 1:40 |
| 10. | "Marie (No Sleep)" | | 2:46 |
| 11. | "Posthumous Release" | Justin Blackburn; Noel Thrasher | 2:57 |
| Total length: | | | 28:03 |
