= Race (name) =

Race is both an English unisex given name and a surname. Notable people with the name include:

== Surname ==
- Harley Race (1943–2019), American wrestler, coach and promoter
- Hugo Race (born 1963), Australian musician
- Janice Race, American former comic book editor
- John Abner Race (1914–1983), American politician
- John Burton-Race (born 1957), British chef
- Stephen Race
  - Stephen Race (bishop) (born 1969), British Anglican bishop
  - Steve Race (musician) (1921–2009), British musician and radio personality
  - Steve Race (politician) (born 1983), British politician

== Given name ==
- Race Davies (born 1962), British actress
- Race Imboden (born 1993), American fencer
- Race Mathews (1935–2025), Australian politician, author, and co-operative economist
- Race Wong (born 1982), Singaporean actress
