= Rocket (Alex G album) =

Studio album by Alex G
- Released: May 19, 2017
- Genre: Indie rock; contemporary folk; Americana
- Length: 41:46
- Label: Domino
- Producer: Alex Giannascoli

Alex G chronology
| Beach Music (2015) | Rocket (2017) | House of Sugar (2019) |

Singles from Rocket
- 1. "Bobby" Released: March 2, 2017; 2. "Witch" Released: March 2, 2017; 3. "Proud" Released: April 4, 2017; 4. "Brick" Released: May 4, 2017; 5. "Sportstar" Released: May 4, 2017

Rocket is the seventh studio album by American musician Alex G, released on May 19, 2017, through Domino Recording Company.

== Release ==
On March 2, 2017, Giannascoli announced that his seventh studio album, Rocket, would be released on May 19. The announcement was accompanied by the release of the first two singles, "Bobby" and "Witch", the former accompanied by a music video directed by Colin Acchione (who played bass on two of the album's tracks). On April 4, Giannascoli announced the change of his stage name from Alex G to (Sandy) Alex G, and shared another single, "Proud" alongside a music video. On May 4, he shared two more singles, "Brick" and "Sportstar", with a music video accompanying the latter.

== Critical reception ==
Professional ratings
Aggregate scores
| Source | Rating |
|---|---|
| AnyDecentMusic? | 7.7/10 |
| Metacritic | 82/100 |
Review scores
| Source | Rating |
| AllMusic | 4/5 stars |
| The A.V. Club | B+ |
| Consequence of Sound | B+ |
| DIY | 4/5 stars |
| Exclaim! | 9/10 |
| The Guardian | 4/5 stars |
| MusicOMH | 4/5 stars |
| Pitchfork | 8.4/10 |
| Q | 4/5 stars |
| Uncut | 6/10 |

At Metacritic, which assigns a normalized rating out of 100 to reviews from mainstream publications, Rocket received an average score of 82, based on 21 reviews, indicating "universal acclaim". Writing for Pitchfork, Ian Cohen said, "Sometimes, there really is no substitute for the revelations that come when an artist unlocks the mysteries of their work. But it's certainly the reason why Rocket feels like one of the year's most endlessly generous records, as Alex G's restraint is our gift that keeps on giving." AllMusic's Marcy Donelson stated that Giannascoli is "far from catering to the mainstream here, but through it all, the wistful chords and progressions that are such a trademark of his sound act as a sonic through-line. Also uniting the album are immediate, conversational vocals and, similarly, an impression that accompaniment is gathered in a circle playing along by ear." David Sackllah of Consequence of Sound said, "As inscrutable as it can be at times, Giannascoli never betrays his purpose, making Rocket his most developed and accomplished album yet."

The A.V. Club critic Josh Terry said, "Even though Rocket sometimes feels messy, only a songwriter as prolific and uninhibited as Giannascoli can make the chaos this thrilling and affecting." Sam Shepherd of MusicOMH wrote, "Alex G's skill is in tackling difficult subjects and squeezing them into the most wonderful kernels of pop, and once again, he’s succeeded here." DIY's Will Richards said, "Slowing down and refining his output has allowed Alex the time to make Rocket a brilliantly considered next step. It's also his catchiest record yet." Sammy Maine of The Quietus wrote, "The raw and at times, ferocious navigation of the album soars in its earnest delivery and marks a career-defining release for (Sandy) Alex G." The Guardian writer Harriet Gibsone stated, "It is at times unpleasant, but Rocket has no ambitions to score a dinner party. The frantic interchanging of emotions--like the internal monologue of someone with a hellish hangover at ATP in 2009--is a challenging, ambitious progression."

=== Accolades ===
| Publication | Accolade | Rank | Ref. |
|---|---|---|---|
| Clash | Albums of the Year 2017 | 41 | |
| Consequence of Sound | Top 50 Albums of 2017 | 26 | |
| Crack | The Top 100 Albums of 2017 | 30 | |
| Digital Trends | 50 Best Albums of 2017 | 25 | |
| Esquire | The Best Albums of 2017 | 5 | |
| Exclaim! | Top 20 Pop & Rock Albums | 16 | |
| musicOMH | Top 50 Albums Of 2017 | 33 | |
| NME | Albums of the Year 2017 | 40 | |
| Noisey | The 100 Best Albums of 2017 | 20 | |
| Pitchfork | The 50 Best Albums of 2017 | 48 | |
| PopMatters | The 60 Best Albums of 2017 | 51 | |
| Spin | 50 Best Albums of 2017 So Far | 44 | |
| Stereogum | The 50 Best Albums of 2017 | 21 | |
| Time Out New York | 29 Best Albums of 2017 | 5 | |
| Uproxx | 50 Best Albums of 2017 | 46 | |

== Track listing ==
All tracks are written by Alex Giannascoli.

| No. | Title | Length |
|---|---|---|
| 1. | "Poison Root" | 2:25 |
| 2. | "Proud" | 4:57 |
| 3. | "County" | 3:02 |
| 4. | "Bobby" | 3:43 |
| 5. | "Witch" | 2:40 |
| 6. | "Horse" | 2:04 |
| 7. | "Brick" | 2:12 |
| 8. | "Sportstar" | 3:51 |
| 9. | "Judge" | 2:30 |
| 10. | "Rocket" | 1:59 |
| 11. | "Powerful Man" | 3:39 |
| 12. | "Alina" | 3:03 |
| 13. | "Big Fish" | 2:12 |
| 14. | "Guilty" | 3:34 |
| Total length: | | 41:46 |

== Personnel ==
Credits adapted from the liner notes of Rocket.

- Molly Germer – violin (tracks 1, 4, 5, 10–13), backing vocals (tracks 2, 8)
- David Allen Scoli – piano (tracks 2), saxophone (tracks 14), backing vocals (tracks 14)
- Samuel Acchione – guitar (tracks 3), slide guitar (tracks 4), backing vocals (tracks 14)
- Colin Acchione – bass (tracks 2, 11)
- John Heywood – bass (tracks 3, 4, 8)
- Emily Yacina – backing vocals (tracks 4, 12)
- Erin Porter – backing vocals (tracks 14)
- Jacob Portrait – mixing
- Heba Kadry – mastering
- Rachel Giannascoli – artwork

== Charts ==
| Chart (2017) | Peak position |
|---|---|
| US Heatseekers Albums (Billboard) | 7 |
| US Independent Albums (Billboard) | 23 |
