= Mydata (album) =

Studio album by Katie Dey
- Released: 24 July 2020
- Genre: Synth-pop, experimental pop
- Length: 39:11
- Label: Run for Cover

Katie Dey chronology
Solipsisters (2019)	Mydata (2020)

Singles from Mydata
- 1. "Dancing" Released: 24 June 2020; 2. "Happiness" Released: 7 July 2020

Mydata (stylised as mydata) is the fourth studio album by Australian experimental pop musician Katie Dey. It was released through Run for Cover Records on 24 July 2020.

== Release ==
The album's first single, "Dancing", was released on 24 June 2020, The second single, "Happiness", was released on 7 July 2020.

== Critical reception ==
Professional ratings
Review scores
Source	Rating
Exclaim!	8/10
Pitchfork	7.5/10

Teodor Zetko of Exclaim! reviewed "Mydata conjures real emotion from the digital void." Colin Joyce of Pitchfork said "Mydata suggests the possibility of perseverance, connection, and kindness to oneself and others. Dey finds peace in knowing that this kind of love is just as real as any other."

== Track listing ==
No.	Title	Length
1.	"Darkness"	3:01
2.	"Dancing"	2:54
3.	"Happiness"	4:03
4.	"Leaving"	3:58
5.	"Hurting"	3:27
6.	"Word"	2:00
7.	"Hopeless"	1:51
8.	"Loving"	3:54
9.	"Closeness"	2:10
10.	"Bearing"	6:10
11.	"Hoping"	2:43
12.	"Data"	3:00
