= Virgo Indigo =

Studio album by Fog Lake
- Released: February 4, 2014
- Recorded: September 2013 – January 2014
- Genres: Shoegaze; dream pop; lo-fi
- Length: 32:59
- Label: Orchid Tapes
- Producer: Aaron Powell

Fog Lake chronology
Farther Reaches (2013)	Virgo Indigo (2014)	Victoria Park (2015)

Virgo Indigo is the second full-length studio album from the Newfoundland and Labrador based lo-fi music project Fog Lake. Self-produced by Aaron Powell, the album was released on February 4, 2014, through Brooklyn-based label Orchid Tapes.

== Background ==
After 2013's Farther Reaches gained minor traction through the title track's placement on YouTube channel Majestic Casual and working with cassette-based DIY label Birdtapes, Powell began working on new material that would become Virgo Indigo. By the end of that year, the album was completed: almost the entirety of it having been produced in his St. John's apartment. Featuring a heavily ambient, dream-pop atmosphere, the album would produce one single, It Was Never Enough which premiered on The FADER and No Fear of Pop.

== Track listing ==
1. "Fading Away" – 1:54
2. "Virgo Indigo" – 2:28
3. "Mad Scientist" – 2:03
4. "It Was Never Enough" – 2:54
5. "Erik" – 2:49
6. "Transcanada" – 4:40
7. "Little Black Balloon" - 2:09
8. "Dream Gate" – 2:57
9. "Nocturnal Blues" – 2:39
10. "Pretty Lights" – 1:46
11. "Circuit Rider" - 3:23
12. "Lost Love Letters" - 3:02

== Personnel ==
- Aaron Powell – music, lyrics, recording
- Warren Hildebrand - mastering
