= DSU (album) =

Studio album by Alex G
- Released: June 17, 2014
- Genre: Indie rock
- Length: 32:32
- Label: Orchid Tapes
- Producer: Alex Giannascoli

Alex G chronology
Trick (2012)	DSU (2014)	Beach Music (2015)

Singles from DSU
- 1. "Hollow" Released: September 17, 2014; 2. "Harvey" Released: December 8, 2014; 3. "Soaker" Released: March 18, 2022

DSU is the fifth studio album by American musician Alex G, released on June 17, 2014, through Orchid Tapes.

== Title ==
The title of the album is an abbreviation of Dream State University. It is derived from a comment Giannascoli's older sister, Rachel, had made. He explained

I was asking my sister what I should name the album and she gave me a bunch of names. One of them was Dream State, because I gave her all these songs to listen to and she said that they had a dreamy vibe. I thought that was too cheesy, but I was joking around with the name Dream State University as a play on the whole State University thing that we have in America, and then we were both like 'Oh! That's pretty funny, why don't we do that?' And then I kinda bailed out at the last minute. I just thought it was such a lame fucking name, but I couldn't change it at that point. My sister had already written DSU on the album cover and she was about to put Dream State University at the bottom but I was like 'No! I hate that name, don't do it!' So in the end we just stuck with DSU and it worked out.

== Critical reception ==
Professional ratings
Aggregate scores
Source	Rating
AnyDecentMusic?	7.7/10
Metacritic	79/100
Review scores
Source	Rating
AllMusic	3.5/5 stars
Clash	7/10
Consequence of Sound	B
The Guardian	4/5 stars
Mojo	4/5 stars
NME	8/10
Pitchfork	7.9/10
Q	3/5 stars
Rolling Stone	3.5/5 stars
Uncut	8/10

At Metacritic, which assigns a normalized rating out of 100 to reviews from mainstream publications, DSU received an average score of 79, based on 13 reviews, indicating "generally favorable reviews". Samme Maine of Drowned in Sound wrote, "Alex G speaks a refreshing honesty, with an artistic flair that many before him have failed to master. It's careful yet effortless, passionate yet distant but above-all, wholly unique." NME's Ben Homewood stated that the album "skillfully combines Neil Young's dusty American songcraft with scratchy lo-fi and wandering electronic influences." Dean Essner of Consequence of Sound said, "At its best, DSU cycles through that duality with aplomb, which will serve as an excellent introduction to his gigantic discography for all new fans." Clash's Mat Smith stated that the album "is enduring evidence that the purest, most interesting music inevitably comes without hefty production or marketing budgets." Rolling Stone critic Simon Vozick-Levinson said, "The more you listen, the more obvious it is that Alex G is a bright new talent in his own right."

=== Accolades ===
Publication	Accolade	Rank	Ref.
Consequence of Sound	Top 50 Albums of 2014	45	
CMJ	The 30 Best Albums of 2014	9	
Crack Magazine	Albums of the Year 2014	36	
MusicOMH	Top 100 Albums Of 2014	53	
The Line of Best Fit	The Best Fit Fifty Essential Albums of 2014	—N/a	
Pitchfork	The 200 Best Albums of the 2010s	165	
Rough Trade	Top 100 Albums of The 2014	65	
Time Out London	The 30 Best Albums of 2014	22	
Vogue	The 10 Best Albums of 2014	—N/a	
The Washington Post	Top 50 Albums of 2014	26	

== Track listing ==
All tracks are written by Alexander Giannascoli.

No.	Title	Length
1.	"After Ur Gone"	2:21
2.	"Serpent Is Lord"	3:46
3.	"Harvey"	1:39
4.	"Rejoyce"	1:51
5.	"Black Hair"	2:44
6.	"Skipper"	1:25
7.	"Axesteel"	1:46
8.	"Sorry"	2:42
9.	"Promise"	3:31
10.	"Icehead"	2:50
11.	"Hollow"	4:04
12.	"Tripper"	0:42
13.	"Boy"	3:11
Total length:		32:32

Re-release bonus tracks
No.	Title	Length
14.	"Soaker"	1:40
15.	"Waiting for You"	3:30
Total length:		37:42

== Personnel ==
Credits adapted from the liner notes of DSU.

- Alex Giannascoli – production, recording
- Emily Yacina – vocals on tracks 3, 6, 11
- Samuel Acchione – tambourine on track 8
- Warren Hildebrand – audio mastering
- Jason Mitchell – additional mastering
- Rachel Giannascoli – artwork

== Release history ==
Region	Date	Label	Format	Edition	Ref.
Various	June 17, 2014	Orchid Tapes	LP; digital download	Standard edition	
France	June 17, 2014	Kütu Folk	CD	Standard edition	
Europe	November 10, 2014	Lucky Number	LP; CD; digital download	Bonus tracks edition	
Various	September 16, 2016	Run for Cover	LP; CD; cassette	Bonus tracks edition	
