= Forever Music =

Studio album by Katie Dey
- Released: 28 January 2022
- Studio: Dey's home studio, Melbourne, Australia
- Length: 32:45
- Label: Katie Dey
- Producer: Katie Dey

Katie Dey chronology
Urdata (2021)	Forever Music (2022)	Never Falter Hero Girl (2023)

Singles from Forever Music
- 1. "Unfurl" and "Real Love" Released: 24 January 2022

Forever Music is the fifth studio album by Australian experimental pop musician Katie Dey, self-released on 28 January 2022. The album was preceded by two singles, "Unfurl" and "Real Love", as well as a music video for "Real Love". The album's cover art was designed by Iron T Hawk.

== Background ==
Along with the announcement of the album, Dey released a statement in which she described the record as being "about the eternal power of music and genuine love between women" and "staying alive as long as possible, in defiance against all odds, through life-threatening sickness in world made to hurt [you], doing what little things possible to care for the people you love the most." She also listed her inspirations for the record: Tori Amos, Utada Hikaru, Prince, Ryuichi Sakamoto, Regina Spektor, JPEGMafia, and Hatsune Miku. The album was written, performed, recorded, mixed, and mastered by Dey in her home studio in Melbourne, Australia.

== Style and reception ==
Forever Music ratings
Review scores
Source	Rating
Pitchfork	7.3/10

Pitchfork's Colin Joyce called Forever Music a step away "from the bleak feelings of her early, glitch-scoured work" removed from "the bleak feelings that clouded her early work" where she's now "singing about the possibility of love and the sudden appeal of perseverance when you have something or someone worth living for." The music consists of "simpler, gentler arrangements of voice, keys, and plodding percussion" with vocals "deliberately 'unfiltered and dry', which feels like a bold choice for a musician who made her name with digitalist contortions." Joyce says the album's "unadorned arrangements give Dey the space to conjure some real emotional weight" and that her "voice carries desperation, weariness, and then, eventually, joy." While her previous album's production "concealed the special contours of her instrument", Forever Music's "lets her evoke both the bad times and the good, lending depth to the darkness and real color to the moments where she realizes she might make it through."

== Track listing ==
All tracks are written by Katie Dey.

Forever Music track listing
No.	Title	Length
1.	"Unfurl"	1:56
2.	"Real Love"	3:39
3.	"No Love for Songs"	2:44
4.	"Fuckboy"	3:55
5.	"Sharp Teeth"	2:50
6.	"Equidistant"	4:41
7.	"Impossible"	2:36
8.	"Happy Girl"	3:07
9.	"Forever Music"	4:17
10.	"Rot with Me"	3:00
Total length:		32:45
