= Foxes in Fiction =

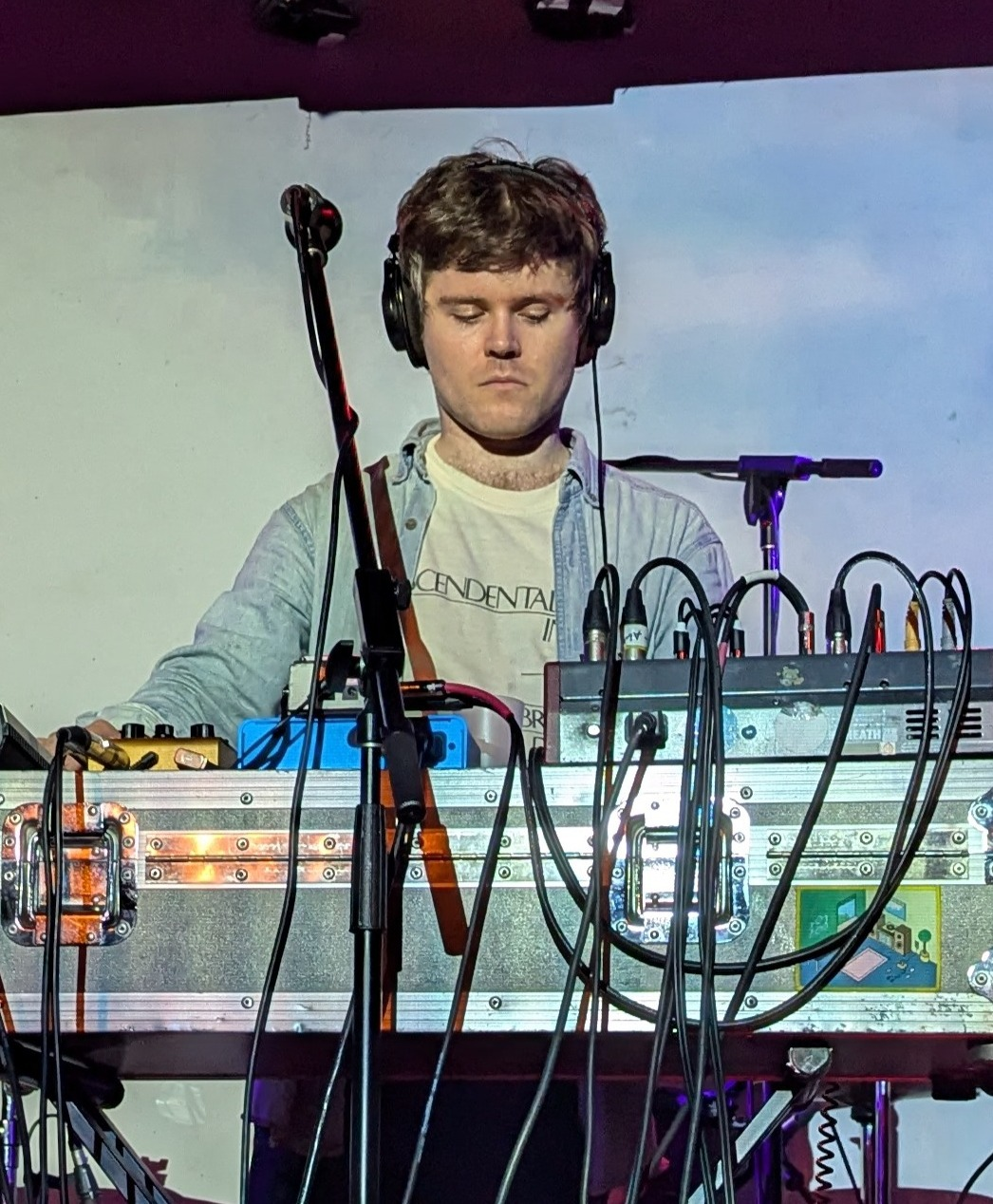
- Foxes in Fiction playing at La Sala Rossa in Montreal in 2024

Background information
- Born: Warren Hildebrand
- Origin: Toronto, Ontario, Canada
- Genres: Bedroom pop; lo-fi; ambient
- Labels: Orchid Tapes, Moodgadget Records

Warren Hildebrand, known professionally as Foxes in Fiction, is a Canadian singer-songwriter, producer, and the founder of the independent record label Orchid Tapes.

== Life and career ==
Hildebrand first began recording as Foxes in Fiction while still in high school in Toronto in April 2005. His first album, Swung from the Branches, was released in 2010 on Orchid Tapes, a label that Hildebrand founded. He moved to New York City in 2012 and in 2014 released his second album, Ontario Gothic. Foxes in Fiction's third album, Trillium Killer, was released in 2019.

He is the grandson of Canadian ice hockey and lacrosse player Ike Hildebrand.

Hildebrand is queer.

== Discography ==
Albums

- Swung from the Branches (2010)
- Ontario Gothic (2014)
- Trillium Killer (2019)

EPs

- Alberto (2010)
