= Rules (Alex G album) =

Studio album by Alex G
- Released: January 15, 2012
- Genre: Indie rock
- Length: 29:20
- Label: Self-released; Bandcamp
- Producer: Alex G

Alex G chronology
Race (2011)	Rules (2012)	Trick (2012)

Rules is the third studio album by American musician Alex G. It was self-released via Bandcamp on January 15, 2012. Recorded and produced entirely by Giannascoli, the album continues his early lo-fi, home-recorded aesthetic. The album cover was painted by Alex's mom.

== Reception ==
Though initially released independently with limited exposure, Rules was later remastered and reissued on vinyl and CD in 2015 by Lucky Number, helping it reach a broader audience. The album has since been regarded by fans and critics as a formative work in Alex G's discography, showcasing his distinct songwriting and experimental sound.

== Track listing ==
All tracks are written by Alex Giannascoli.

Rules track listing
No.	Title	Length
1.	"Water"	2:06
2.	"Come Back"	3:17
3.	"Fighting"	2:19
4.	"Wicked Boy"	2:39
5.	"Candy"	3:17
6.	"Mis"	3:20
7.	"Master"	1:56
8.	"New"	3:19
9.	"Know Now"	1:13
10.	"Rules"	3:15
11.	"Message"	2:39
Total length:		29:20
