= Stephen Race =

Stephen or Steve Race may refer to:

- Stephen Race (bishop) (born 1969), British Anglican bishop
- Steve Race (musician) (1921–2009), English composer, pianist, and radio and television presenter
- Steve Race (politician) (born 1983), British Labour Party politician
