= Beach Music (album) =

Studio album by Alex G
- Released: October 9, 2015
- Recorded: Fall 2014 – Spring 2015
- Genre: Indie rock
- Length: 37:04
- Label: Domino
- Producer: Alex Giannascoli

Alex G chronology
| DSU (2014) | Beach Music (2015) | Rocket (2017) |

Singles from Beach Music
- 1. "Bug" Released: August 27, 2015; 2. "Salt" Released: September 9, 2015; 3. "Kicker" Released: September 21, 2015

Beach Music is the sixth studio album by American musician Alex G, released on October 9, 2015, through Domino Recording Company, his first album under the label. The album's title is a reference to the 1995 novel of the same name by Pat Conroy.

== Album cover ==
The cover was painted by Alex's sister, Rachel Giannascoli. It depicts Rama, a Hindu deity, and Hanuman, the monkey god and servant of Rama hugging.

== Critical reception ==
Professional ratings
Aggregate scores
| Source | Rating |
|---|---|
| AnyDecentMusic? | 7.3/10 |
| Metacritic | 73/100 |
Review scores
| Source | Rating |
| AllMusic | 4/5 stars |
| Clash | 7/10 |
| Consequence of Sound | B |
| The Guardian | 4/5 stars |
| The Line of Best Fit | 8/10 |
| MusicOMH | 4/5 stars |
| Pitchfork | 7.2/10 |
| Rolling Stone | 3.5/5 stars |
| Spin | 9/10 |
| Uncut | 3/5 stars |

At Metacritic, which assigns a normalized rating out of 100 to reviews from mainstream publications, Beach Music received an average score of 73, based on 18 reviews, indicating "generally favorable reviews". AllMusic critic Marcy Donelson said, "Despite its experimental elements and trippy sensibility, Beach Music is relentlessly intimate, moving, and hard to shake—a notable trait for a young if experienced recording artist." Spin's Sasha Geffen wrote, "Alex G has always found power in the broken and uncertain. He’s just gotten a lot braver about spinning that chaos into beauty." The magazine later named it the tenth best album of 2015. Sam Shepherd of MusicOMH said, "Beach Music will almost certainly push Alex G into the wider consciousness, and rightly so." The Guardian's Kate Hutchinson thought the album sounds "familiar, yet impossibly charming."

Sophie Weiner of Rolling Stone stated, "By the time you've gotten used to Beach Music's relaxed melancholy, it's become a much-needed refuge." Writing for The New York Times, Jon Pareles said, "Alex G's narrators have often been traumatized, druggie, lovesick or inscrutable, and moving up the indie-rock circuit hasn't made his new songs any more outgoing. Just the opposite: They are more cryptic and withdrawn." Stephen Jenkins of The Line of Best Fit wrote, "Whether it haunts you, puts you in a dreamlike state, or simply makes you hum along, Beach Music is an album which should be listened to without hesitation." Consequence of Sound writer Adam Kivel said, "Beach Music feels like the work of an artist a few steps ahead of his audience, jumping to answer their expectations of a DIY darling taking on the trappings of a label." Pitchfork's Pat Healy said, "Complicated arrangements and gorgeous melodies reveal themselves to you as rewards for your patience. Over time, even the alien voices begin to sound natural, even inviting."

== Track listing ==
All tracks are written by Alex Giannascoli, except "Intro", lyrics written by Rachel Giannascoli.

| No. | Title | Length |
|---|---|---|
| 1. | "Intro" | 0:49 |
| 2. | "Bug" | 2:39 |
| 3. | "Thorns" | 2:50 |
| 4. | "Kicker" | 2:50 |
| 5. | "Salt" | 4:39 |
| 6. | "Look Out" | 1:53 |
| 7. | "Brite Boy" | 2:30 |
| 8. | "In Love" | 3:30 |
| 9. | "Walk" | 1:27 |
| 10. | "Mud" | 2:00 |
| 11. | "Ready" | 4:20 |
| 12. | "Station" | 2:34 |
| 13. | "Snot" | 5:03 |
| Total length: | | 37:04 |

== Personnel ==
Credits adapted from the liner notes of Beach Music.

- Alex Giannascoli – production, engineering
- Rachel Giannascoli – vocals (track 1)
- John Slavin – trumpet (track 8)
- Mike Corso – electric upright bass (track 8)
- Emily Yacina – vocal harmony (track 10)
- Jacob Portrait – mixing
- Heba Kadry – mastering

== Charts ==
| Chart | Peak position |
|---|---|
| US Heatseekers Albums (Billboard) | 9 |
