= Spencer Radcliffe =

American singer-songwriter

- Born: Toledo, Ohio, United States
- Genres: Rock, pop, lo-fi, experimental
- Instruments: Guitar, vocal
- Labels: Run for Cover, Orchid Tapes
- Website: spencerradcliffeandeveryoneelse.com

Spencer Radcliffe is an American singer-songwriter, musician, and producer who has also composed instrumental music under the name Blithe Field.

== Career ==
Radcliffe began releasing music in 2008 under the name Blithe Field, self-releasing an album, Old Songs/New Songs. Two years later, Blithe Field released the 2010 full-length album Beautiful Wave '74, on Messy Life Records. In 2011, Blithe Field released a third album, Two Hearted, on Messy Life Records. In 2012, Blithe Field released a fourth album, Warm Blood, by Poulpe Mort.

Radcliffe currently releases music under his full name, Spencer Radcliffe. In 2013, he released a demo, Sinking Down. He was also part of the four-piece emo/indie band Best Witches from Chicago, Illinois that were around from 2013 to 2014. In November 2014, Radcliffe and R.L. Kelly released a split, Brown Horse on Orchid Tapes.

In 2015, Radcliffe signed to Run for Cover Records. His first album with the label, Looking In, was released on October 2, 2015. On August 4, Radcliffe released the first single from the album, "Mia", and was named Stereogum's "Artist to Watch". On August 25, Radcliffe premiered a second song from his upcoming album, "Yankee". Radcliffe embarked on a twenty-date-tour in support of the album, including dates with Alex G and LVL UP.

In 2016, Radcliffe began performing with a group of musicians referred to collectively as "Everyone Else", and began working on a full-length album with the group as well. On March 30, 2017, the group announced a full length titled Enjoy The Great Outdoors and released a single, "Wrong Turn". Enjoy The Great Outdoors was released by RFC on May 12, 2017. On May 17, 2019 the group released a full-length album, Hot Spring.

== Discography ==
=== As Spencer Radcliffe ===
==== Studio albums ====
- Looking In (2015, Run for Cover)

=== As Spencer Radcliffe & Everyone Else ===
==== Studio albums ====
- Enjoy the Great Outdoors (2017, Run for Cover)
- Hot Spring (2019, Run for Cover)

===== EPs =====
- Keeper (2014, self-released)
- If I Knew How (2018, self-released)

=== As Blithe Field ===
==== Studio albums ====
- Old Songs/New Songs (2008, self-released)
- Beautiful Wave '74 (2010, Messy Life)
- Two Hearted (2011, Messy Life)
- Warm Blood (2012, Poulpe Mort)
- Face Always Toward the Sun (2016, Orchid Tapes)
- Days Drift By (2018, Joy Void)
- Ward Unbending (2019)
- Hymn for Anyone (2020)
- Grits Kissed (2023)
