= House of Sugar =

Studio album by Alex G
- Released: September 13, 2019
- Studio: New York City; Alex's home (Philadelphia); Duck Room at Blueberry Hill (St. Louis); PUDH II; The Acchione's (Philadelphia)
- Genre: Indie rock, experimental pop
- Length: 37:45
- Label: Domino
- Producer: Alexander Giannascoli

Alex G chronology
Rocket (2017)	House of Sugar (2019)	We're All Going to the World's Fair (Original Motion Picture Soundtrack) (2022)

Singles from House of Sugar
- 1. "Gretel" Released: June 4, 2019; 2. "Hope" Released: July 15, 2019; 3. "Southern Sky" Released: August 13, 2019; 4. "Near" Released: August 14, 2019

House of Sugar is the eighth studio album by American musician Alex G, released on September 13, 2019, through Domino Recording Company.

The album's title is a reference to both the SugarHouse Casino (now called Rivers Casino) in Philadelphia and the gingerbread house from "Hansel and Gretel".

== Recording ==
House of Sugar was recorded in New York City and Alex's home in Philadelphia, except for "SugarHouse (Live)" which was recorded at Duck Room at Blueberry Hill in St. Louis, Missouri on November 6, 2018. Drums for "Walk Away", "Hope", "Taking" and "Crime" were recorded at PUDH II. Drums for "Near" were recorded at The Acchione's in Philadelphia.

== Release ==
Alex G debuted on Billboard's Emerging Artists chart following the release of House of Sugar. The album appeared on a number of Billboard charts, including reaching the number 5 spot on the Heatseekers Albums chart as well as number 3 on Vinyl Albums, number 20 on Rock Album Sales and number 43 on Top Album Sales with 5,000 equivalent album units earned.

== Critical reception ==
Professional ratings
Aggregate scores
Source	Rating
AnyDecentMusic?	8.1/10
Metacritic	86/100
Review scores
Source	Rating
AllMusic	4/5 stars
Clash	8/10
Consequence of Sound	B+
Exclaim!	9/10
MusicOMH	4/5 stars
NME	4/5 stars
Pitchfork	8.6/10
Q	4/5 stars
The Skinny	4/5 stars
Tiny Mix Tapes	4.5/5 stars

At Metacritic, which assigns a normalized rating out of 100 to reviews from mainstream publications, House of Sugar received an average score of 86, based on 16 reviews, indicating "universal acclaim".

Hannah Flint of Q praised the album's musical variation, commenting, "At first, House of Sugar can make you feel like you accidentally left the shuffle button on but, a few listens in, it's those twists and turns that make it such a satisfying listen."

=== Accolades ===
Publication	Accolade	Rank	Ref.
Exclaim!	Top 20 Pop and Rock Albums of 2019	4	
Noisey	Top 100 Albums of 2019	3	
Noisey	Top 100 Albums of the 2010s	97	
No Ripcord	Top 50 Albums of 2019	6	
Obscure Sound	Top 50 Albums of 2019	5	
Pitchfork	Top 50 Albums of 2019	17	
Pitchfork	Best Rock Albums of 2019	-	
Stereogum	Top 50 Albums of 2019	6	
Under the Radar	Top 100 Albums of 2019	64	

== Track listing ==
All tracks are written by Alexander Giannascoli.

No.	Title	Length
1.	"Walk Away"	4:16
2.	"Hope"	2:36
3.	"Southern Sky"	3:12
4.	"Gretel"	3:10
5.	"Taking"	2:14
6.	"Near"	2:09
7.	"Project 2"	2:22
8.	"Bad Man"	1:51
9.	"Sugar"	2:48
10.	"In My Arms"	2:43
11.	"Cow"	2:44
12.	"Crime"	3:59
13.	"SugarHouse (Live)"	3:41
Total length:		37:45

Japanese edition bonus tracks
No.	Title	Length
14.	"Gretel (Solo)"	2:12
15.	"SugarHouse (Solo)"	2:07
16.	"Fell (Live at the Headroom)"	5:37
Total length:		47:58

== Personnel ==
Credits adapted from the liner notes of House of Sugar.

- Alexander Giannascoli – songwriting, production, engineering
- Samuel Acchione – guitar (track 13), electric guitar (track 1), vocals (track 13)
- Colin Acchione – bass (track 3)
- John Heywood – bass (tracks 5, 13)
- Tom Kelly – drums (tracks 2, 13)
- David Allen Scoli – saxophone (track 13)
- Molly Germer – violin (tracks 3, 4, 9), vocals (track 12)
- Emily Yacina – vocals (track 3)
- Rachel Giannascoli – vocals (track 6), album art
- Jacob Portrait – mixing, engineering [drums] (tracks 3, 4, 10)
- Harrison Fore – engineering
- Heba Kadry – mastering
- Chris Bellman – lacquer cut
- David Allen Scoli – insert drawing

== Charts ==
Chart	Peak position
UK Independent Albums (OCC)	40
US Top Alternative Albums (Billboard)	25
US Independent Albums (Billboard)	16
