= Coma Cinema =

American indie pop band

- Origin: Spartanburg, South Carolina, U.S.
- Genre: Indie pop
- Years active: 2005–present
- Labels: Fork and Spoon

Coma Cinema is an American indie pop band formed by Mat Cothran in 2005. Cothran began writing songs for the band during his high school days in Spartanburg, but the band was later based in Asheville, North Carolina.

== History ==
Cothran began writing songs under the name Coma Cinema early in his teens. After years of performing locally, Cothran released a collection of his recordings in January 2009, entitled Baby Prayers.

Baby Prayers caught the attention of music blogs and websites—including Pitchfork.com, who posted the music video for "Flower Pills" in February 2010. In June 2010, Coma Cinema followed up with their second album, Stoned Alone.

Coma Cinema's third album, Blue Suicide, was released in March 2011 both digitally through Bandcamp and physical formats (Wonderbeard Tapes released cassette tapes; Fork and Spoon Records pressed the vinyl). Two tracks off Blue Suicide have already been released in a split 7-inch single with the band Teen Porn through AMDISCS: "Wondering" and "Greater Vultures."

Coma Cinema released their fourth record, Posthumous Release, on June 11, 2013, on cassette tape through Orchid Tapes and on vinyl through Fork and Spoon Records.

Their fifth record, titled Loss Memory, was released on December 7, 2017.

On April 15, 2025, a single titled Thomas Kinkade's Grand Delusion was released with little warning, going onto announce the release of his 6th album, titled Grand Delusion on the same day. In the description of the YouTube release of the song, Cothran states that the album, "...(will be) releasing worldwide very soon."

== Discography ==
=== Studio albums ===
- Baby Prayers (2009)
- Stoned Alone (2010)
- Blue Suicide (2011)
- Posthumous Release (2013)
- Loss Memory (2017)
- Grand Delusion (2025)

=== EPs ===
- Abandoned Lands (2011)

=== Singles ===
- Coma Cinema (split 7-inch) (2010)
- Santa's on His Way (2025)

=== Compilations ===
- Bluest of Them All; Anthology (2012)

== See also ==
- Elvis Depressedly
