= I Saw the TV Glow (score) =

I Saw the TV Glow (Original Motion Picture Score)

Film score by Alex G
- Released: May 16, 2024
- Genre: Film score
- Length: 41:03
- Label: A24 Music
- Producer: Alex G

Alex G chronology
Live from Union Transfer (2023)	I Saw the TV Glow (Original Motion Picture Score) (2024)	Headlights (2025)

I Saw the TV Glow (Original Motion Picture Score) is the score album to the 2024 film of the same name, directed by Jane Schoenbrun. The album features 20 tracks from the original score composed by Alex G and released through A24 Music on May 16, 2024.

== Background and release ==
I Saw the TV Glow is Alex G's second feature film scoring assignment after We're All Going to the World's Fair (2021), also directed by Schoenbrun. Alex G provided a mixtape from Schoenbrun for working on the film's score. As they had been fans of Alex's works, Schoenbrun wrote a fan letter to Alex, and in return, he sent them voice memos and recorded demos of the score to Schoenbrun via email. Some of the cues were purposefully chopped and screwed and detuned to create an uneasy sonic atmosphere. The score further threads the film's soundtrack, serving as a companion project to the former. The score album was released through A24 Music on May 16, 2024.

== Reception ==
Jourdain Searles of The Hollywood Reporter wrote, "Alex G's haunting soundtrack emulates the depressed, sonically chaotic sound of 90s rock." Katie Rife of IGN described the score as "louder and more grating," while Chris Bumbray of JoBlo.com called it "highly effective." Chad Collins of Dread Central and Taylor Antrim of Vogue called it "sensational" and "excellent." Siddhant Adlakha of Mashable described the music as "effectively capturing its story in microcosm." Jen Yamato of The Washington Post wrote, "composer Alex G's thrumming indie pop soundscape conjures a shadow world that looms over the mundane suburbs." Kate Bove of Screen Rant described it as "an equally surreal and poignant mix of sounds".

== Track listing ==
No.	Title	Length
1.	"Opening Theme from The Pink Opaque"	1:43
2.	"Election Night"	2:38
3.	"High School Hallway"	1:48
4.	"Ice Cream Transformation"	0:47
5.	"Suburban Drift"	1:50
6.	"Marco Polo"	0:55
7.	"Love Theme from The Pink Opaque"	1:15
8.	"Saturday Night in Maddy's Basement"	1:33
9.	"Blue Glow"	1:32
10.	"TV Burn"	1:46
11.	"Downed Power Line"	3:34
12.	"The Double Lunch"	4:00
13.	"The Final Episode"	1:55
14.	"Buried Alive"	1:29
15.	"Planetarium (Outside)"	3:12
16.	"Planetarium (Inside)"	4:35
17.	"No One Will Find Us There"	1:24
18.	"Money Machine"	0:52
19.	"Box Cutter"	0:57
20.	"The Fun Center"	3:18
Total length:		41:03
