= Elvis Depressedly =

American experimental pop group

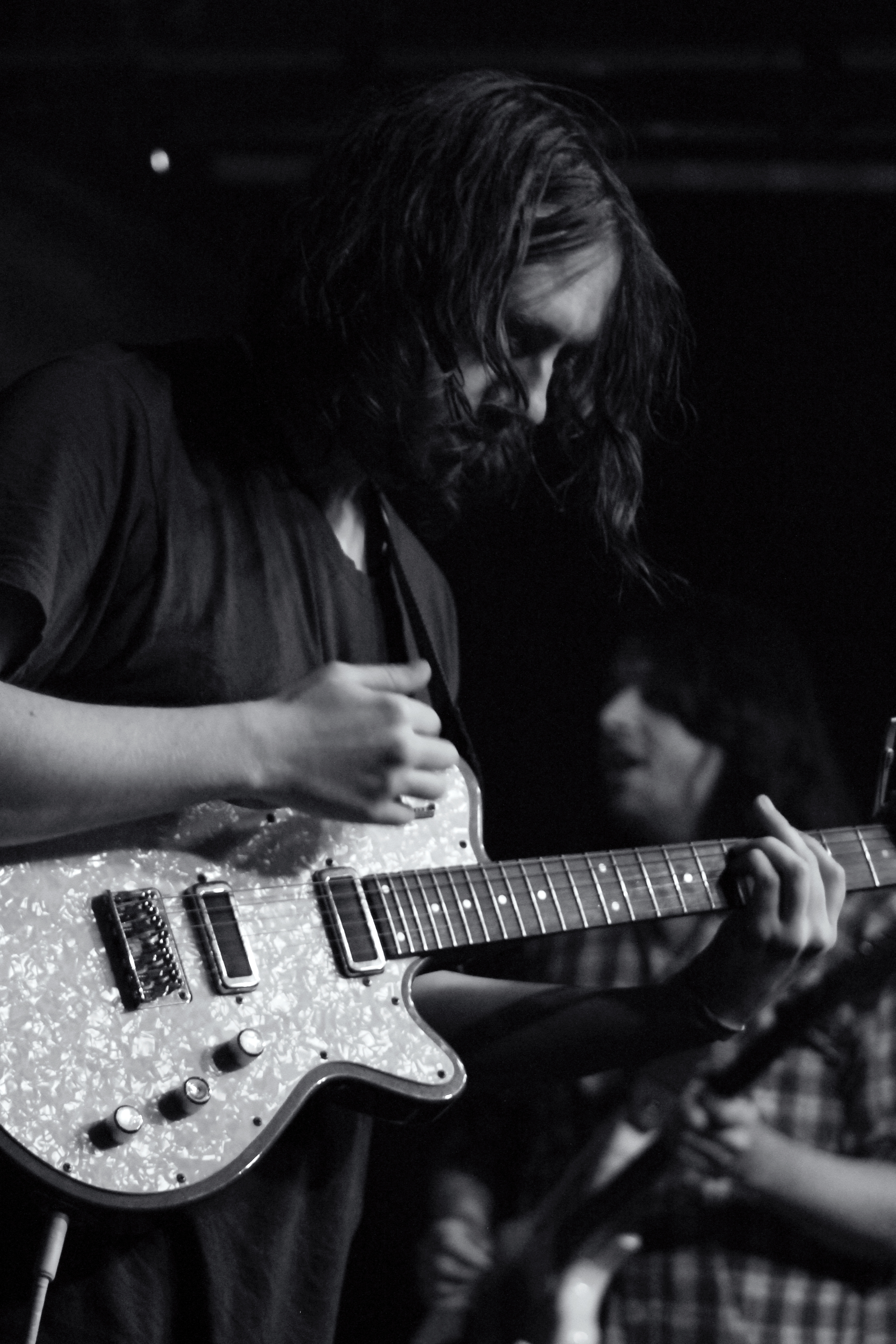

Background information
- Origin: Columbia, South Carolina, U.S.
- Genres: Indie pop, lo-fi, hypnagogic pop, slowcore
- Years active: 2011–2023
- Label: Run for Cover
- Past members: Mat Cothran; Delaney Mills

Elvis Depressedly are an American experimental pop project from Asheville, North Carolina. The band consists of former Coma Cinema frontman Mat Cothran and various collaborators. They have released eight records and several EPs.

Their music has been described as "evoking [...] childhood nights fraught with existential dread" and has been likened to the earlier music of Ariel Pink and Elliott Smith.

== History ==
=== Formation, Early EPs, and Run for Cover ===
Elvis Depressedly was formed in 2011 in Columbia, South Carolina, originally as a way for Cothran to explore his Bowie-esque alter ego of "Mickey", referenced in the early EPs as a way for him to confront and examine his fears and anxieties.

The band debuted with the self-release of the five-track EP Save the Planet Kill Yourself. It was followed by the EP Goner, and the single "Disgraceland" in the same year. In 2012 Cothran played his first show under the name Elvis Depressedly, playing the entirety of the album Mickey's Dead, which was released later that year on Orchid Tapes.

The album was named one of the best free albums of 2012 by The Social. Hotter Sadness was released in October 2012. The EP Holo Pleasures, released via Birdtapes in 2013, was a breakthrough of sorts, giving the band more exposure than any previous release, despite getting no press coverage.

In November 2014, the band signed to Run for Cover Records. After the recording was completed, Cothran moved to Asheville.

=== New Alhambra and Holo Pleasures/California Dreamin' ===
In 2015, the band released a new album titled New Alhambra, which was proclaimed by Pitchfork to be "a utopian sort of indie-pop record", giving it a 7.3. They went on a short tour following the release of the album. The album charted: it peaked at #7, at #6 as a Heatseeker Album, #23 as an Alternative Album, and #33 as a Rock Album. Rolling Stone put "N.M.S.S.", the second track on the album, at #23 on a list of the best songs of 2015.

In 2016, Run for Cover announced Holo Pleasures/California Dreamin', a compilation of the earlier Holo Pleasures EP with the unreleased California Dreamin' EP. The album appeared on June 3, 2016 with a video for their song "Up In the Air" as support. The band also announced a joined U.S. tour with Teen Suicide and Nicole Dollanganger, and embarked on their first UK tour.

== Influences ==
Cothran has cited Emperor X, Prefab Sprout, The Waterboys, The Jesus and Mary Chain, Elliott Smith, Primal Scream, and Pink Floyd as influences.

== Discography ==
=== Studio albums ===
- Mickey's Dead (2012)
- Hotter Sadness (2012)
- New Alhambra (2015)
- Depressedelica (2020)
- Who Owns the Graveyard? (2023)

=== EPs ===
- Save the Planet Kill Yourself (2011)
- Goner (2011)
- Disgraceland (2011)
- Holo Pleasures (2013)
- California Dreamin' (2016)

== See also ==
- Coma Cinema
