= Race (Alex G album) =

Studio album by Alex G
- Released: August 9, 2011
- Recorded: 2009
- Studio: Home/bedroom recordings
- Genres: Lo-fi, indie rock, bedroom pop
- Length: 30:31
- Label: Self-released (Bandcamp)
- Producer: Alexander Giannascoli

Alex G chronology
| Winner (2011) | Race (2011) | Rules (2012) |

Race is the debut studio album by American singer-songwriter Alex G. It was self-released via Bandcamp in 2011 (release date stated as 2010 as "that's when he started giving out CD's") and features lo-fi, bedroom-recorded indie rock songs that showcase Giannascoli's early DIY production.

== Background and release ==
Alexander Giannascoli wrote and recorded the material for Race in 2009 while still a teenager in his hometown of Havertown. The album was self-released on Bandcamp on August 9th, 2011.

Also, in early 2013, a limited run of 100 cassette copies of Race were released under the label Gold Soundz.

In March 2021, Race was repressed on vinyl for the first time. This repress was mastered by Heba Kadry in 2020 and released exclusively through Alex G’s official merchandise store, and hours later, the vinyl had already sold out. It was intended to support the artist’s band and crew during the COVID-19 pandemic when touring was not possible. The vinyl track listing is sequential regardless of side.

== Composition and style ==
Race features short, intimate tracks marked by understated guitar work, minimal percussion, and lo-fi vocal deliveries. The album’s sound typifies Giannascoli’s early output within the DIY and indie rock communities.

== Track listing ==
All tracks are written by Alexander Giannascoli.

| No. | Title | Length |
|---|---|---|
| 1. | "Remember" | 2:08 |
| 2. | "The Same" | 2:31 |
| 3. | "TV" | 1:15 |
| 4. | "Gnaw" | 3:21 |
| 5. | "Trash" | 2:48 |
| 6. | "House" | 2:54 |
| 7. | "Crab" | 3:33 |
| 8. | "Go Away" | 0:57 |
| 9. | "Let It Go" | 2:15 |
| 10. | "Things to Do" | 2:37 |
| 11. | "Time/Space" | 1:20 |
| 12. | "Cross Country" | 1:09 |
| 13. | "Race" | 3:43 |
| Total length: | | 30:31 |

== Additional material ==
There were plans for an accompanying release titled RACE (Extras) features two extra tracks from the same era that were not included on the original Bandcamp release of Race. This never got officially released. These tracks are available via YouTube:

- "Not Anywhere"
- "Remember (Electric demo)"

== Personnel ==
- Alexander Giannascoli – vocals, guitar, bass, percussion, production, recording
