= R.L. Kelly =

- Also known as: RL
- Born: Rachel Levy
- Origin: Los Angeles, California
- Years active: 2013–present
- Label: Orchid Tapes Birdtapes Lauren Records
- Website: rlsux.bandcamp.com

R.L. Kelly (born Rachel Levy) is an American electropop musician from Los Angeles, California.

== Career ==
Levy began her career in February 2013, releasing her first EP titled Life's A Bummer. In September 2013, Levy released a 7" split with Alex G via Birdtapes. In late 2014, she released a split with musician Spencer Radcliffe, titled Brown Horse. Levy additionally released a standalone digital single later that year titled "Alright". In March of 2019, Levy released Blink 183, a two-song EP on Bandcamp, as well as The Back Catalogue, Vol. 421, a cassette tape which compiles RL tracks from over the years. In September 2022, Levy changed from the "unfortunate jokey name" R.L. Kelly to simply RL. In September of that year, she released the EP Be True via Lauren Tapes, which includes a new version of her song "Feels Real" as well as three new tracks.

== Discography ==
EPs

- Life's a Bummer (2013, Orchid Tapes)
- Blink 183 (2019)
- Be True (2022, Lauren Records)

Splits

- Split 7" (with Alex G) (2013, Birdtapes)
- Brown Horse (with Spencer Radcliffe) (2014, Orchid Tapes)
