= God Save the Animals =

Studio album by Alex G
- Released: September 23, 2022
- Studios: Headroom Studios (Philadelphia); Spice House (Philadelphia); SugarHouse (New York City); Clubhouse (Rhinebeck, New York); Gradwell House Recording (Haddon Heights, New Jersey); Watersong Music (Bowdoinham, Maine); Alex's home (Philadelphia)
- Length: 43:59
- Label: Domino
- Producers: Alexander Giannascoli; Jacob Portrait

Alex G chronology
We're All Going to the World's Fair (Original Motion Picture Soundtrack) (2022)	God Save the Animals (2022)	Live from Union Transfer (2023)

Singles from God Save the Animals
- 1. "Blessing" Released: May 23, 2022; 2. "Runner" Released: June 21, 2022; 3. "Cross the Sea" Released: July 26, 2022; 4. "Miracles" Released: September 8, 2022

God Save the Animals is the ninth studio album by American musician Alex G, released on September 23, 2022, by Domino Recording Company. It was produced by Alex G and Unknown Mortal Orchestra bass guitarist Jacob Portrait and recorded at various studios in Philadelphia and the northeast United States. It was promoted by four singles including "Blessing" and "Runner". It received acclaim from critics, appearing on various lists of 2022's best albums, and charted on the US Billboard 200 as well as in New Zealand and Scotland.

== Recording ==
God Save the Animals was recorded at Headroom Studios, Spice House, and Alex's home in Philadelphia, as well as SugarHouse in New York City, Clubhouse in Rhinebeck, New York, Gradwell House Recording in Haddon Heights, New Jersey, and Watersong Music in Bowdoinham, Maine. The album was co-produced by Alex G and Jacob Portrait.

== Promotion ==
The album's first single, "Blessing", was released on May 23, 2022, prior to the album's announcement. God Save the Animals was officially announced on June 21, 2022, alongside the release of the album's second single "Runner". A third single, "Cross the Sea", was released on July 26, 2022. A fourth single, "Miracles", was released on September 8, 2022.

On July 19, 2022, Alex G performed the single "Runner" on The Tonight Show Starring Jimmy Fallon and also performed the single "Miracles" on The Late Show with Stephen Colbert.

== Critical reception ==
Professional ratings
Aggregate scores
Source	Rating
AnyDecentMusic?	8.2/10
Metacritic	86/100
Review scores
Source	Rating
AllMusic	4/5 stars
Clash	8/10
Exclaim!	9/10
Mojo	3/5 stars
NME	5/5 stars
The Observer	4/5 stars
Pitchfork	8.4/10
The Skinny	5/5 stars
Slant Magazine	4.5/5 stars
Uncut	8/10

God Save the Animals received widespread acclaim from music critics. At Metacritic, which assigns a normalized rating out of 100 to reviews from professional publications, the album received an average score of 86, based on 17 reviews. Aggregator AnyDecentMusic? gave it 8.2 out of 10, based on their assessment of the critical consensus.

Will Richards of NME gave the album a perfect five-star rating, praising its "newfound clarity and vulnerability" and writing that it "further confirms his place as one of his generation's most consistently brilliant songwriters." Writing for Beats Per Minute, John Amen gave the album a score of 85%, commenting that "God Save the Animals' production approaches are understated compared to those employed in previous work yet still precisely rendered. What stand out – prominently and unabashedly – are Alex's impeccably crafted and irresistibly delivered songs." Aaron Mook of Chorus.fm "Highly Recommended" the album, writing that it "does exactly what most new albums should: it takes the best aspects of Alex G's past work...and miraculously weaves them into something new. The album is rich with details that become more rewarding with every listen, making God Save the Animals not only an album of the year contender, but among the best work of the songwriter's career."

In a mixed review, Chris Catchpole of Mojo wrote, "The inventiveness on display is undeniably impressive, but the process sometimes hides a little too much of the artist behind it."

=== Year-end lists ===
God Save the Animals on year-end lists
Publication	List	Rank	Ref.
The A.V. Club	The 30 best albums of 2022	23	
Billboard	The 50 Best Albums of 2022	37	
Exclaim!	50 Best Albums of 2022	4	
The New York Times	Best Albums of 2022: Lindsay Zoladz	4	
NME	The 50 best albums of 2022	33	
NPR Music	The 50 Best Albums of 2022	12	
Paste	The 50 Best Albums of 2022	2	
Pitchfork	The 50 Best Albums of 2022	10	
Rolling Stone	The 100 Best Albums of 2022	27	
Stereogum	The 50 Best Albums of 2022	6	

== Track listing ==
All tracks are written by Alex Giannascoli.

God Save the Animals track listing
No.	Title	Length
1.	"After All"	3:19
2.	"Runner"	2:36
3.	"Mission"	3:05
4.	"S.D.O.S"	2:50
5.	"No Bitterness"	3:38
6.	"Ain't It Easy"	2:54
7.	"Cross the Sea"	3:36
8.	"Blessing"	3:05
9.	"Early Morning Waiting"	4:03
10.	"Immunity"	3:50
11.	"Headroom Piano"	2:53
12.	"Miracles"	3:44
13.	"Forgive"	4:26
Total length:		43:59

== Personnel ==
- Alexander Giannascoli – performance, production, engineering
- Samuel Acchione – guitar (tracks 3, 8, 9, 13), banjo (track 13)
- Jessica Lea Mayfield – additional vocals (track 1)
- John Heywood – bass (tracks 8, 9, 13)
- Tom Kelly – drums (tracks 5, 8, 13)
- Molly Germer – strings (tracks 9, 12), string arrangement (tracks 9, 12), additional vocals (track 3)
- Jacob Portrait – production, mixing, engineering
- Mark Watter – engineering
- Kyle Pulley – engineering
- Scoops Dardaris – engineering
- Eric Bogacz – engineering
- Connor Priest – engineering
- Steve Poponi – engineering
- Earl Bigelow – engineering
- Anjan Alavandar – assistant engineering
- Isaac Eiger – assistant engineering
- Shubham Mondal – assistant engineering
- Sophie Shalit – assistant engineering
- Heba Kadry – mastering
- Rachel Giannascoli Masciantonio – artwork

== Charts ==
Chart performance for God Save the Animals
Chart (2022)	Peak position
Australian Digital Albums (ARIA)	41
Australian Physical Albums (ARIA)	40
New Zealand Albums (RMNZ)	38
Scottish Albums (Official Charts)	44
UK Album Downloads (Official Charts)	54
UK Independent Albums (Official Charts)	13
US Billboard 200	144
US Independent Albums (Billboard)	23
US Top Alternative Albums (Billboard)	16
US Top Rock Albums (Billboard)	23
