= Orchid Tapes =

Canadian–American record label

- Founded: 2010
- Founder: Warren Hildebrand
- Genre: Indie rock, indie pop, experimental, electronic
- Country of origin: U.S.
- Location: New York City
- Official website: www.orchidtapes.com

Orchid Tapes is a Canadian–American independent record label based in New York City. It was founded in 2010 in Toronto, Ontario by Warren Hildebrand. Operated by Hildebrand, the label has released a number of indie compilations and original releases on cassette tape, limited edition vinyl, and digital download. Among Orchid Tapes' signed artists are Coma Cinema, Foxes in Fiction (Hildebrand's alias as a musician), and Alex G. The label focuses on "music and artwork that breaks free of the established norm...reflects the dedication of its creator and provokes a strong emotional resonance..."

== History ==
=== Founding ===
Orchid Tapes was founded in 2010 by Warren Hildebrand, while Hildebrand was attending an art university in Toronto, Ontario. He had first started putting the idea for a label together in 2009, and had picked the name Orchid Tapes partly after a song by the band Deerhunter, called "Tape Hiss Orchid." According to Hildebrand, "I was really inspired by all the little cassette labels that were popping up on different blogs around that time. It seemed like a really cheap and easy way to get music out into the world beyond just the proliferation of mp3s."

Hildebrand founded Orchid Tapes while living in his apartment in downtown Toronto and working on the debut album of his solo project, Foxes in Fiction. Hildebrand had started Foxes in Fiction in April 2005 while still in high school, and began to take the project more seriously in 2008, while inspired by artists such as Brian Eno and Atlas Sound.

=== First album ===
Hildebrand states that the label was started as a vehicle for his solo project, Foxes in Fiction. The label's first release was the Foxes in Fiction album Swung from The Branches, released on February 19, 2010. The album became a surprise hit on the internet, eventually being covered by Pitchfork.

Many of the other early bands signed to the label met Hildebrand through MySpace. According to Hildebrand, "It felt good meeting a group of other sad weirdos that recorded music from home that I felt like I genuinely connected with, even through something as seemingly alienating as the Internet."

=== Move to New York ===
In 2012, Hildebrand moved from Toronto to New York. Brian Vu joined the label later that year, helping expand the roster and the label's scope. For most of the label's lifespan, Hildebrand would dub each cassette tape on his stereo tape deck, a several-day process he was still using after the 20th release. Finally, in the fall of 2013, he purchased a cassette duplicator for the label. According to No Fear of Pop in 2013, "Orchid Tapes embodies the D.I.Y. aesthetic that has implanted itself on the internet. Digital downloads are always free and cassette prices are reasonable, and the quality of music is so good that it entices intrigued listeners to search through the rest of the catalog."

Orchid Tapes states on its website that it seeks "music and artwork that breaks free of the established norm, disregards trends, reflects the dedication of its creator and provokes a strong emotional resonance within whoever experiences it."

The label's first release on vinyl was the Three Love Songs LP by Ricky Eat Acid, released in late 2013 with limited copies available. According to Noisey in January 2014, "a largely ambient project from Maryland's Sam Ray, Three Love Songs sold out its pre-release vinyl run on the up-and-coming Orchid Tapes label in two days." Noisey reviewed the album positively, stating "Featherweight electronics, aching piano, snippets of speech, even a pitched up Drake sample swirl around in a stew of delicately rendered pathos."

In February 2014, the label released Virgo Indigo by Fog Lake, which is the solo project of Aaron Powell from Newfoundland. The album was mastered by Hildebrand. Later that month, the label released the vinyl compilation Boring Ecstasy, which features tracks by artists such as Alex G, Ricky Eat Acid, R.L. Kelly, Home Alone, and Four Visions.

As of 2016, Orchid Tapes has been solely operated by Warren Hildebrand.

=== Showcases ===
Orchid Tapes periodically organizes and hosts musical showcases, with three in 2013 alone. Venues have included Hildebrand's rooftop, a 100-year-old synagogue in Los Angeles, in conjunction with The L.A. Fort and multiple New York venues. For the March 2014 release of Boring Ecstasy, artists including Elvis Depressedly, Alex G, Ricky Eat Acid, R.L. Kelly, Home Alone, and Four Visions played a showcase at Brooklyn music venue Shea Stadium (named for the much larger stadium of the same name).

== Artists ==
Current

- Apollo Vermouth
- Balam Acab
- Blithe Field
- Fog Lake
- Ghost Orchard
- Foxes in Fiction
- R.L. Kelly
- Yohuna

Previous

- Julia Brown
- Alex G
- Soccer Mommy

== Discography ==
Orchid Tapes discography
| Cat# | Released | Album title | Artist(s) | Notes |
|---|---|---|---|---|
| OCT001 | February 19, 2010 | Swung from The Branches | Foxes in Fiction | |
| OCT002 | June 7, 2010 | Isolation Tape Night | Teenage Reverb | |
| OCT003 | May 31, 2010 | Elmwood EP | Trans-Bedroom Sound | |
| OCT004 | June 29, 2010 | *luhn | Ryan S. Welfle | |
| OCT005 | July 20, 2010 | The Concrete Thoughts of Felix Tengen EP | Ryan S. Welfle | |
| OCT006 | July 25, 2010 | M M R | Mickey Mickey Rourke | Cass, Album, Ltd |
| OCT007 | August 2, 2010 | Beko_CS02 August compilation | Various | Cass, Ltd |
| OCT008 | September 30, 2010 | Summertime in Heaven | Ghost Animation | |
| OCT009 | December 23, 2010 | Alberto EP | Foxes in Fiction | Cass, Ltd, c35 |
| OCT010 | October 18, 2010 | Double Negatives | Actual Water | |
| OCT011 | October 20, 2010 | Octogasm | Lazy Dre | |
| OCT012 | October 30, 2010 | Descending Dusk | Trans-Bedroom Sound | |
| OCT013 | November 23, 2010 | Lost in a Dark Aquarium | Paneye | |
| OCT014 | January 22, 2011 | Down in The Valley EP | Weed (Will Anderson) | Cass, EP, Ltd |
| OCT015 | January 2, 2011 | Old Friends | Happy Trendy | Cass, Ltd |
| OCT016 | June 1, 2011 | Golden Years + G A L A | Wonder Bear | |
| OCT017 | November 1, 2011 | We Grew Up | Young Waves | |
| OCT018 | November 20, 2011 | Die Young | Happy Trendy | Cass, Ltd |
| OCT019 | December 6, 2012 | Nothin’ Compares compilation | Various | Cass, Ltd |
| OCT020 | January 28, 2014 | LUST | Meishi Smile | |
| OCT021 | October 2, 2012 | Lately | Evenings | Cass, Album, Ltd |
| OCT022 | October 9, 2012 | Hotter Sadness | Elvis Depressedly | Cass, Ltd |
| OCT023 | December 13, 2012 | Bluest of Them All Anthology | Coma Cinema | Cass |
| OCT024 | December 17, 2012 | You Get Sick; You Regret Things | Ricky Eat Acid | Cass, Ltd |
| OCT025 | January 21, 2012 | Alberto EP (reissued edition) | Foxes in Fiction | |
| OCT026 | October 27, 2013 | What Would Your Closest Friend Do? Showcase compilation | Various | Cass |
| OCT027 | February 16, 2013 | Teddybears & Weed | Home Alone | |
| OCT028 | February 19, 2013 | Life’s a Bummer EP | R.L. Kelly | |
| OCT029 | April 16, 2013 | Holo Pleasures | Elvis Depressedly | |
| OCT030 | June 11, 2013 | Posthumous Release | Coma Cinema | Cass, 250 |
| OCT031 | September 28, 2013 | ANGELTOWN Showcase compilation | Various | |
| OCT032 | June 27, 2013 | When We’re Snow | Infinity Crush | |
| OCT033 | December 14, 2013 | Euphoria Again | Euphoria Again | |
| OCT034 | February 4, 2014 | Virgo Indigo | Fog Lake | Cass, digital |
| OCT035 | January 21, 2014 | Three Love Songs | Ricky Eat Acid | Label's first vinyl release, digital |
| OCT036 | January 25, 2014 | Three Love Songs: B-Sides & Outtakes | Ricky Eat Acid | Cass |
| OCT037 | March 4, 2014 | Their Bodies in a Fog | Arrange | |
| OCT038 | March 15, 2014 | There’s A Light Coming Through | Home Alone | |
| OCT039 | March 25, 2014 | Boring Ecstasy: The Bedroom Pop of Orchid Tapes | Various | Digital, vinyl |
| OCT040 | October 4, 2014 | Brown Horse | Spencer Radcliffe & R.L. Kelly | |
| OCT041 | August 26, 2014 | Flow | Ex-Confusion | |
| OCT042 | June 17, 2014 | DSU | Alex G | |
| OCT043 | July 15, 2014 | HEAVEN | The Bilinda Butchers | |
| OCT044 | October 28, 2014 | Shadow | Mister Lies | |
| OCT045 | September 23, 2014 | Ontario Gothic | Foxes in Fiction | |
| OCT046 | January 13, 2015 | Angeltown II | Various | |
| OCT048 | May 12, 2015 | New Alhambra | Elvis Depressedly | |
| OCT049 | July 28, 2015 | You're Worth More To Me Than 1,000 Christians | Les Mouches | Vinyl reissue |
| OCT052 | June 11, 2015 | asdfasdf | Katie Dey | |
| OCT053 | June 30, 2015 | Victoria Park | Fog Lake | |
| OCT054 | December 11, 2015 | Haloed | High Bloom | Cass, 200 |
| OCT055 | January 16, 2016 | Face Always Toward The Sun | Blithe Field | Cass |
| OCT056 | December 17, 2015 | Child Death | Balam Acab | Vinyl |
| OCT057 | April 7, 2016 | Poppy | Ghost Orchard | Cass |
| OCT058 | April 8, 2016 | Bliss | Ghost Orchard | Cass |
| OCT059 | June 17, 2016 | For Young Hearts | Elvis Depressedly | Cass |
| OCT060 | August 12, 2016 | Radiating Light: Orchid Tapes & Friends | V/A | Vinyl |
| OCT061 | September 9, 2016 | Patientness | Yohuna | Vinyl |
| OCT062 | October 28, 2016 | Spell | Emily Reo | Vinyl |
| OCT064 | February 17, 2017 | Dragonchaser | Fog Lake | Cass |
| OCT065 | July 14, 2017 | Crashing Into Nowhere | Apollo Vermouth | Cass |
| OCT066 | June 7, 2019 | Mirroring | Yohuna | Vinyl |
| OCT067 | August 23, 2019 | Bunny | Ghost Orchard | Vinyl |
| OCT068 | October 18, 2019 | Trillium Killer | Foxes in Fiction | Vinyl |
| OCT069 | March 20, 2020 | Forever Underground | Phantom Posse | Vinyl |
| OCT070 | August 28, 2020 | Breaking | Breaking | Vinyl |
| OCT071 | March 26, 2021 | Visiting the Well | Pleasure Systems | Cass, vinyl |
