= Emily Yacina =

Musician from Philadelphia

- Born: Philadelphia, Pennsylvania, US
- Genres: Indie pop; indie rock; lo-fi; bedroom pop
- Years active: 2011–present

Emily Catherine Yacina is an American singer-songwriter from Philadelphia, Pennsylvania. Her music has been described as indie pop, indie rock, lo-fi, and bedroom pop. She has been described as having a very soft and simple musical style, along with emotional vocals. She began her career on Bandcamp.

She has released most of her music independently without a record label, with some exceptions, and encourages more artists to do the same. She occasionally collaborates with other artists, including Alex G. Their song "Treehouse," released in 2011, is one of Yacina's biggest successes in her music career, as the song has gained popularity multiple times over the years, most recently through TikTok.

== Upbringing ==
Emily Yacina was born and raised in Philadelphia, Pennsylvania, but as of 2023 resides in Long Beach, Los Angeles, California. She grew up in the same area as indie artist Alex G, whom she met during their high school years, leading to multiple collaborations since then.

== Career ==
=== 2011–2019 ===
Emily Yacina states that she has been playing guitar since she was 10 years old, with her first music releases in 2011, including "Treehouse" (featuring Alex G) and two albums, "Flood" and "Reverie". She continued in 2013 with the album "Bloom". In 2015, she released two EPs; one of them, "Soft Stuff" was dedicated to her close friend Mark Ronan, who had died. The other record, "Pull Through" was described by The Fader as one of "[2015's] prettiest EPs". In 2016, she released two more EPs titled "Nice Try" which highlighted her vocals, and "Overflow" a longer record with 10 tracks. In 2017, Emily Yacina spent the summer in Alaska for a job, which involved several months without internet and other conveniences. Yacina described this as a good time for reflection and an opportunity to write more music, culminating in the album "Heart Sky". In 2018, she returned with a shorter EP, "Katie" and a single, "When the Sun Goes". In 2019, Emily Yacina released a series of singles that eventually became the album "Remember the Silver" produced with Erik Littman, who died in 2021. The album's themes explore a range of emotions, especially love and depression. The album received mixed reviews, with positive remarks on her "emotional" and "weightless" voice, while some critics found it "dry and often listlessy delivered" with "vague impressionable notes and juvenile rhyme shemes". Yacina responded to the negative reviews, specifically from Pitchfork, saying, "[The writer] chose to reduce my voice into something weak and lovesick, completely misunderstanding the meaning behind the songs [they] mentioned" also criticizing the reviewer's internalized misogyny. Yacina has toured both solo and as a duo with Yohuna (Johanne Swanson).

=== 2022 and All the Things: A Decade of Songs ===
After several years without any solo releases during the COVID-19 pandemic, Emily Yacina announced she would release a retrospective album covering her past decade as an artist. The album included three new singles along with ten selected tracks from various albums and EPs throughout her career. The new songs were also released separately in an EP titled "Dominos". One of the tracks, "DB Cooper" is dedicated to Littman, her late producer and friend.

=== 2023– ===
In November 2023, Emily Yacina released the single "Nothing Lasts" produced in collaboration with Rostam Batmanglij and his label, Matsor Projects. This was followed by the track "Trick of the Light" in January 2024, with both songs being released together on a 7-inch vinyl record.

== Personal life ==
Yacina studied Environmental studies at The New School in New York City and has also worked with an environmentally focused nonprofit organization in Fairbanks, Alaska.

== Artistry ==
In a 2017 interview, Emily Yacina stated that her all-time favorite artist is Liz Phair. Yacina's music has been compared to artists such as Clairo, Big Thief, and Snail Mail.

According to Yacina, the majority of her lyrics are autobiographical.

== Discography ==
=== Album ===
- Flood (2011)
- Reverie (2011)
- Bloom (2013)
- Heart Sky (2017)
- Remember the Silver (2019)
- All the Things: A Decade of Songs (2022)
- Veilfall (2025)

=== EPs ===
- Soft Stuff (2015)
- Pull Through (2015)
- Nice Try (2016)
- Overflow (2016)
- Katie (2018)
- Chances (2020)
