= Alex G =

American musician (born 1993)

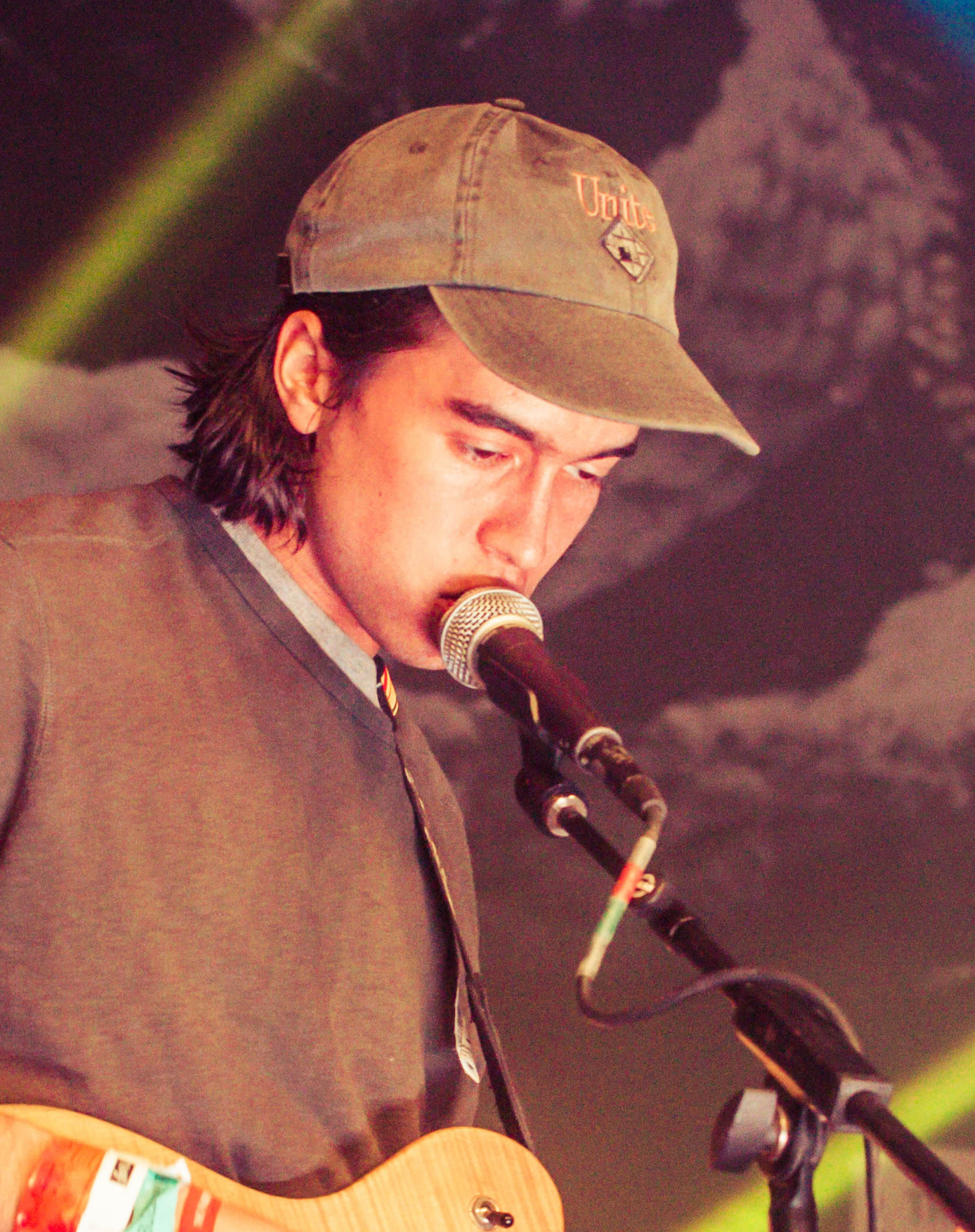
- Alex G in 2015

Background information
- Also known as: (Sandy) Alex G (2017–2020)
- Born: Alexander Giannascoli; February 3, 1993 (age 33); Havertown, Pennsylvania, U.S.
- Genres: Indie rock; folk rock; folktronica; lo-fi; DIY
- Occupations: Musician; singer-songwriter; record producer
- Instruments: Vocals; guitar; drums; keyboards; bass; banjo; accordion
- Works: Alex G discography
- Years active: 2009–present
- Labels: Domino; Run for Cover; Orchid Tapes; Lucky Number; RCA
- Website: sandyalexg.com

Alexander Giannascoli (born February 3, 1993), better known by his stage names Alex G and formerly (Sandy) Alex G, is an American musician, producer, and singer-songwriter.

Giannascoli started his career playing in local bands before pursuing a solo music career. At 17, he began to release his own music and released his first album under the name Alex G in 2010. His first solo work was self-released on Bandcamp before his label debut, DSU (2014), was released on Orchid Tapes. He later signed with Lucky Number. In 2015, he signed with Domino Recording Company and released the studio albums Beach Music (2015), Rocket (2017), House of Sugar (2019) and God Save the Animals (2022). In 2024, he signed with RCA Records and released Headlights (2025).

Giannascoli scored Jane Schoenbrun's films We're All Going to the World's Fair (2021), I Saw the TV Glow (2024), and Teenage Sex and Death at Camp Miasma (2026).

Although predominantly recording solo, Giannascoli is joined live by a backing band consisting of Sam Acchione (guitar), John Heywood (bass), and Tom Kelly (drums), a lineup that has remained constant since 2016. They are occasionally joined by Molly Germer on violin.

== Early life and education ==
Giannascoli was born on February 3, 1993, in Havertown, Pennsylvania, a Philadelphia suburb. His father's family originates from Abruzzo in Southern Italy. Giannascoli has an older brother, Matt (David), and an older sister, Rachel.

At age 11, Giannascoli's older brother gave him a guitar which he learned to play and he began recording music. While attending Haverford High School, Giannascoli made two albums that he shared with friends. He experimented with different musical styles while making collaborative music. This included the "goth techno" he made with his sister in their band MOTHER, The Scoli Xtreme with his older brother, as well as the projects involving his high school band The Skin Cells, described as "pop rock that accidentally ended up being punk". Giannascoli's friend and bandmate in The Skin Cells, Sam Acchione, would later tour extensively with Giannascoli as a longtime member of his backing band.

In 2011, Giannascoli enrolled at Temple University, where he studied English in hopes of becoming a teacher, eventually dropping out to pursue a career in music.

== Career ==
After self-releasing various albums, EPs, and singles on Bandcamp from 2010 to 2012, Giannascoli's popularity spread through word of mouth, blogs, and reverence by other musicians. The Fader called Giannascoli "the internet's secret best songwriter." This led to Orchid Tapes signing Giannascoli to its roster and the release of his label debut DSU (2014) on the label in the US. The album name stands for "Dream State University". In November 2014, DSU was released by Lucky Number in Europe on all formats with two new bonus tracks. The label later reissued his two preceding releases from 2012, Rules and Trick. The album garnered acclaim from music critics. Crack magazine described it as "a perfectly carbonised amalgam of early Radiohead, Pavement and Elliott Smith that's been enthusiastically received." The song "Harvey" is about Giannascoli's love for his younger brother, and the album also explores themes of "the disintegration of relationships, with family, friends and lovers." The track "Rejoyce" referenced James Joyce's A Portrait of the Artist as a Young Man. Following the release of the album, Giannascoli went on tour throughout North America and Europe.

In 2014, Giannascoli signed with Domino Recording Company and released his debut with the label Beach Music on October 9. In 2015, Giannascoli worked with Frank Ocean on his albums Endless and Blonde (both 2016), providing guitars and arrangements for several songs. He also joined Ocean's live band on guitar for his 2017 tour.

On March 2, 2017, Giannascoli announced that his second album with Domino, Rocket, would be released on May 19 and shared the first two singles, "Bobby" and "Witch". On April 4, he released another single from the album, "Proud". On May 4, he released two more singles, "Brick" and "Sportstar", before the release of the album. Rocket received acclaim from music critics and appeared on multiple publications' year-end lists of the best albums of 2017.

On April 4, 2017, Giannascoli announced the change of his stage name from Alex G to (Sandy) Alex G. The music publication Spin attributed the name change to a legal conflict with singer and YouTuber Alex Blue, who was operating at the time under the trademarked name "Alex G". On choosing the name Sandy, Giannascoli said it "was the first thing [he] put on Bandcamp" and that he had "just used that 'Sandy' as a sort of [social media] tag" since then. The "Sandy" was supposed to be silent, hence the parentheses, but he noticed that people kept pronouncing it. In June 2020, he dropped "(Sandy)" from his stage name, returning to going by Alex G.

On September 13, 2019, Giannascoli released his eighth studio album, House of Sugar. The album received positive reviews and placed 17th on Pitchfork's year-end best albums list. Giannascoli co-produced Tomberlin’s EP Projections which was released in October 2020, which was recorded in his apartment in Philidelphia.

Giannascoli scored the film We're All Going to the World's Fair, released on April 8, 2022. He also scored Jane Schoenbrun's film I Saw the TV Glow, which was released by A24 in 2024. On September 23, 2022, Giannascoli released his ninth studio album, God Save the Animals. In January 2024, Giannascoli announced his signing with RCA Records and an upcoming tour supporting the band Foo Fighters.

On May 2, 2025, Alex G performed at Bernie Sanders's "Fighting Oligarchy: Where We Go From Here" rally held at the Pennsylvania Farm Show Complex & Expo Center in Harrisburg, Pennsylvania. In the same month, Giannascoli announced his tenth studio album and RCA Records debut, Headlights. It was released on July 17.

== Musical style ==
Giannascoli's music is often characterized as indie rock with a lo-fi esthetic due to recording all his music independently in his home. He is frequently compared to singer-songwriter Elliott Smith, who he is influenced by. He is also compared to the bands Built to Spill and the Martinis.

The Philadelphia Inquirer praised him as "a particularly gifted melody writer" whose "fuzzy, sometimes distorted songs, which hark back to slightly askew 1990s bands such as Pavement, can't hide his skill as a pop craftsman and a constructor of elliptical narratives that call for repeated listening." He stated that his creative process consists of him usually working alone in his room with his guitar and adding other instruments later. When asked about working in a professional recording studio, he replied, "I feel like I'm eventually going to have to do that, but I just don't want to. Because I don't know how to work all that stuff, and I don't want anyone else to have control. I just want to follow my own ideas, and I'm uncomfortable doing it any other way."

Despite being formerly hesitant to record his music in professional studios, God Save the Animals (2022) was studio-recorded with help from Jacob Portrait during the COVID-19 pandemic.

== Personal life ==
Giannascoli has been in a relationship with violinist Molly Germer since 2017. Germer has provided violin and background vocals for every Alex G album since Rocket, and occasionally plays with the band live. The couple has a son who was born in 2023.

== Discography ==
=== Studio albums ===
- Winner (2011)
- Race (2011)
- Rules (2012)
- Trick (2012)
- DSU (2014)
- Beach Music (2015)
- Rocket (2017)
- House of Sugar (2019)
- God Save the Animals (2022)
- Headlights (2025)

=== Soundtrack albums ===
- We're All Going to the World's Fair (2022)
- I Saw the TV Glow (2024)
- Teenage Sex and Death at Camp Miasma (2026)

=== Live albums ===
- Live at The Headroom (2015)
- Live at Third Man Records (2018)
- Live from Union Transfer (2023)

=== EPs ===
- Easy (2011)
- Paint (2013)
- Split 7" with R.L. Kelly (2013)
