= Fist & Palm =

Studio album by Bellows
- Released: September 30, 2016
- Recorded: October 2014 – December 2015
- Genre: Pop/Rock
- Length: 36:02
- Label: Double Double Whammy
- Producer: James Chase Wilcox

Professional ratings
Review scores
Source	Rating
Tiny Mix Tapes	3.5/5 stars

Fist & Palm is the third studio album by indie music artist Oliver Kalb, under his pseudonym Bellows. The idea for the concept album came from one of Kalb's closest relationships coming to an end. Overall, the album is described as inspired by folk and indie music, but also contains musical elements of traditional popular music. The sound and feel are soothing and melodic. The lyrics attempt to portray feelings of both parties of the friendship, and all different related emotions, such as anger, loss and lament. The majority of the album was composed during one month, October 2014, as part of a song-a-day challenge.

== Track listing ==
All tracks are written by Oliver Kalb.

No.	Title	Length
1.	"You Are a Palm Tree"	4:25
2.	"Orange Juice"	3:10
3.	"Thick Skin"	3:09
4.	"Bummer Swells"	1:58
5.	"Spring, Summer, Autumn, Winter"	2:58
6.	"O Joy"	2:33
7.	"A Sordid Ending"	1:31
8.	"Bully"	3:07
9.	"Beauty"	4:34
10.	"Dark Heart"	3:46
11.	"From the Palms"	4:51
Total length:		36:02

== Personnel ==
- Oliver Kalb – artwork, composer, engineer
- Gabrielle Smith – string and choral arrangements
- Paul Gold – mastering
