= Robert Kolodny (filmmaker) =

American filmmaker

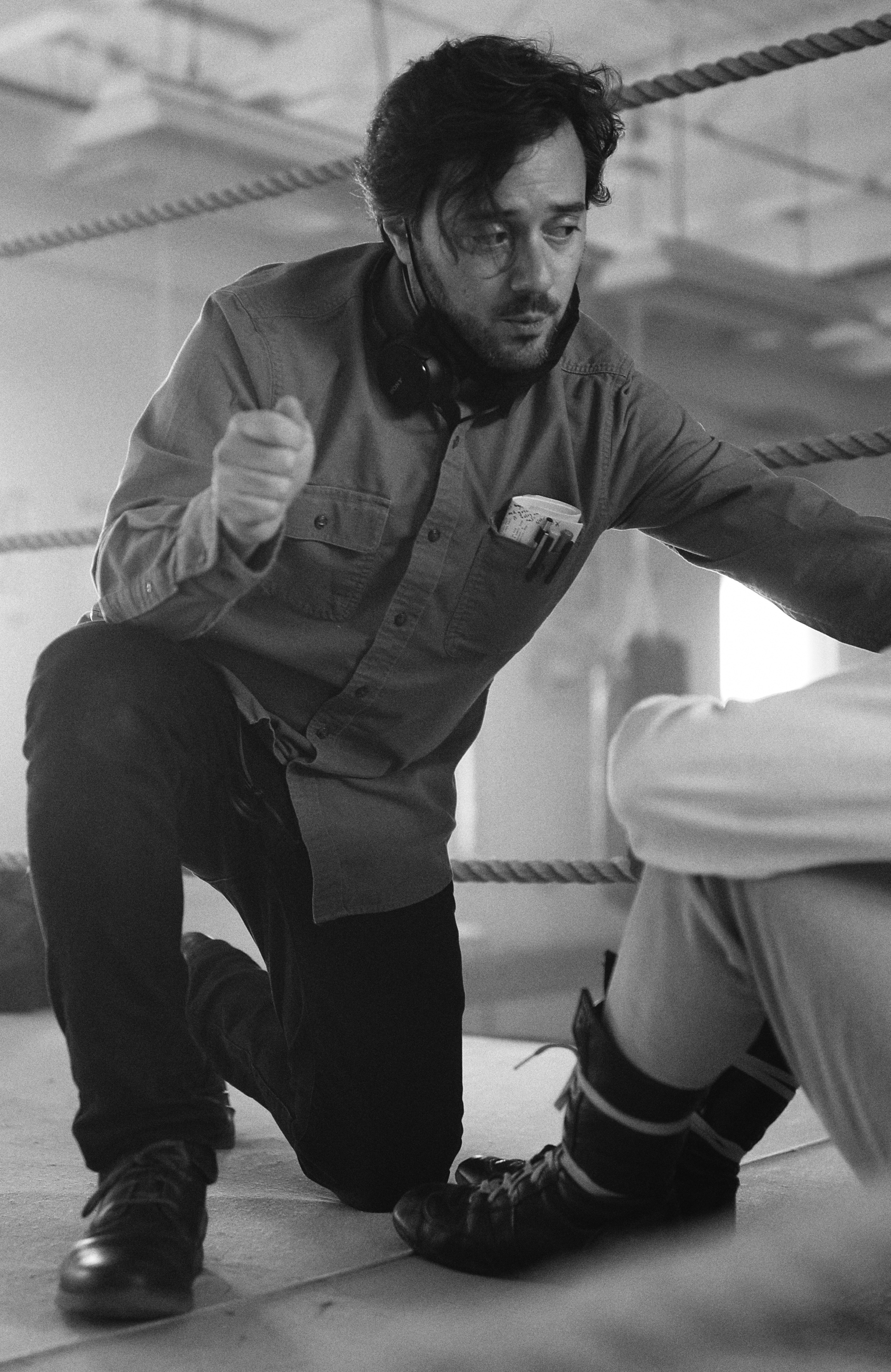
- Kolodny on set
- Born: Freehold, New Jersey, U.S.
- Education: School of Visual Arts
- Occupations: Film director; screenwriter; cinematographer; professor
- Years active: 2010–present

Robert Kolodny is an American film director, writer and cinematographer. His 2023 debut feature film, The Featherweight, premiered at the 80th Venice International Film Festival. He was a cinematographer for the Peabody Award-winning documentary film All the Beauty and the Bloodshed, released in 2022.

== Early life ==
Kolodny grew up in Freehold Township, New Jersey, and attended Freehold High School where he began making films at a young age after developing a fascination with motion pictures. He studied Film Direction at the School of Visual Arts in New York City, where he studied under Manfred Kirchheimer. During this time Kolodny began an artistic collaboration with Chilean poet and artist Cecilia Vicuña.

== Career ==
In 2010, Kolodny formed the production company House of Nod. Through this company he began to create commercial work as well as music videos with Brooklyn based artists such as Japanese Breakfast, Frankie Cosmos, LVL UP and Gabby's World.

In 2013 Robert Kolodny won an Emmy for directing a season of the culinary TV program Frankie Cooks. The same year he directed the short film Fly on Out which won the grand prize at the AbelCine Vision Research Miro High-Speed Inspiration Challenge.

Around this time Kolodny began working as a documentary cinematographer, initially on Lenny Cooke by the Safdie brothers and then with Robert Greene on Kate Plays Christine and Bisbee '17. He worked his way up to being the director of photography for Greene's Netflix film Procession, Alex Ross Perry's Pavements and one of the cinematographers of the Peabody Award-winning and Academy Award nominated All the Beauty and the Bloodshed by Laura Poitras. In 2026, he produced and photographed the film Too Much Sugar which premiered at the 83rd Venice International Film Festival. For several years Kolodny was working on a nonfiction film about Bulgarian Olympian Serafim Todorov.

In 2018, he created the film elements for Disappeared Quipu which appeared at the Brooklyn Museum, the Museum of Fine Arts Boston and MALBA. The massive site-specific art art piece included a looping four channel video projection composed of intricately drifting ancient Andean textiles. During the COVID-19 pandemic Kolodny collaborated playwright Taylor Mac on several of musical specials that streamed online and then later were performed live. In 2022 he was named one of Doc NYC's 40 under 40.

Key collaborators in Kolodny's work include his cinematographer brother Adam Kolodny, producer Bennett Elliott, Robert Greene, Alex Ross Perry and Sean Price Williams. Robert Kolodny is a professor of film at his alma mater, the School of Visual Arts, where he teaches directing and screenwriting.

=== The Featherweight ===
The Featherweight was Robert Kolodny's feature film directorial debut. It tracks the post-retirement career of former world champion boxer Willie Pep and his troubled road to a comeback, as a direct cinema film crew documents his daily life. Starring James Madio, Ron Livingston, Stephen Lang, Keir Gilchrist and Ruby Wolf, the film received critical acclaim for its realism and intricate craft. Guy Lodge from Variety said: "Kolodny puts nary a foot wrong in his precise replication of a midcentury vérité aesthetic and gaze, from the particular grain and thrust of the camerawork to the authentically abrasive tone and tenor of the performances."

The Featherweight premiered at the 80th Venice International Film Festival in the Orizzonti competition. Later it was selected as the closing film of the 54th International Film Festival of India. Kolodny was received the John Schlesinger Narrative Award from the Provincetown International Film Festival and the Peter Brunette Award for Best Director at RiverRun International Film Festival for his work on the film.

== Influences ==
Robert Kolodny has publicly cited the work of several directors as being influential to him, including John Cassavetes, Martin Scorsese, Pedro Almodóvar, and David Lynch, as well as the direct cinema movement, specifically the work of D. A. Pennebaker and Albert and David Maysles.

== Filmography ==
Year	Title	Director	Writer	Cinematographer	Editor	Producer	Notes
2010	Shelter	Yes	Yes		Yes		Short
2013	Fly on Out	Yes	Yes	Yes	Yes		Short
2013	Lenny Cooke			Yes			Additional Cinematography
2013	Frankie Cooks	Yes		Yes			TV
2016	Kate Plays Christine			Yes			Additional Cinematography
2017	La Noche de la Especies	Yes			Yes		With Cecilia Vicuna
2018	Bisbee '17			Yes			Additional Cinematography
2018	Disappeared Quipu	Yes		Yes	Yes		With Cecilia Vicuna
2021	Procession			Yes			
2022	All the Beauty and the Bloodshed			Yes			Additional Cinematography
2023	The Sweet East			Yes			Additional Cinematography
2023	The Featherweight	Yes					Feature Debut
2024	Rite Here Rite Now			Yes	Yes		
2024	Pavements			Yes			
2025	V/H/S/Halloween			Yes			Segment: Kidprint
2025	Henry Miller's Paris	Yes		Yes	Yes		Documentary short
2026	Too Much Sugar			Yes		Yes	

Music videos

Year	Title	Artist(s)	Role(s)
2013	"Nightshade"	LVL UP	Director
2015	"Broken Necks"	Gabby's World	Director
2015	"Really Love"	Body Language	DP
2016	"National Parks"	Big Ups	Director
2016	"The Closing Door"	LVL UP	Director
2016	"Everybody Wants To Love You"	Japanese Breakfast	Producer
2016	"Jane Cum"	Japanese Breakfast	Producer
2016	"Thick Skin"	Bellows	Director
2016	"Tummy Ache"	Diet Cig	Director
2017	"Machinist"	Japanese Breakfast	Producer
2017	"Road Head"	Japanese Breakfast	Producer
2017	"Bobby"	Alex G	Producer, Editor
2018	"Boyish"	Japanese Breakfast	Editor
2018	"Carnations"	Palehound	Director, Editor
2018	"Cut Me Off"	Madeline Kenney	Director, Editor
2019	"Dylan Thomas"	Better Oblivion Community Center	Editor
2019	"Aaron"	Palehound	Director, DP, Editor
2019	"Worthy"	Palehound	Director, DP, Editor
2019	"Wannago"	Frankie Cosmos	Director, Editor
2021	"Sam Jam"	Covey	Director, Editor
2021	"1991"	Covey	Director, Editor
2021	"I Wrote You a Song"	Chad Lawson	Director, DP
2021	"Be Sweet"	Japanese Breakfast	Editor
2021	"Savage Good Boy"	Japanese Breakfast	Editor
2021	"Dig"	Barrie	Director, Editor
2021	"Quarry"	Barrie	Director, DP, Editor
2022	"Harness Your Hopes"	Pavement	Editor
2022	"Metal Myths"	Ghost	Producer, DP, Editor
2022	"Bones"	Soccer Mommy	Editor
2022	"Across That Fine Line"	Nation of Language	Director
2023	"Days Move Slow"	Bully	Editor
2023	"Too Much, Enough"	Nation of Language	Director
2023	"Jesus He Knows Me"	Ghost	DP, Editor
2023	"Tidal Session"	Momma	Producer, DP, Editor
2023	"Ghostwriter"	Speedy Ortiz	DP
2024	"Stopping and Staring"	Gustaf	Editor
2024	"Missing Out"	Maya Hawke	DP, Editor
2024	"Dark"	Maya Hawke	DP, Editor
2024	"I'm A Man"	Kim Gordon	Editor
2024	"After Hours"	Christian Lee Hutson	DP, Editor
2024	"Paradise Pop. 10"	Christian Lee Hutson	DP, Editor
2025	"Orlando in Love"	Japanese Breakfast	Editor
2025	"Picture Window"	Japanese Breakfast	Editor
2025	"Bunky Pop"	Sleigh Bells	Editor
2025	"Stay in Your Lane"	Courtney Barnett	DP, Editor
