= O.K. (Gabby's World album) =

Studio album by Eskimeaux
- Released: May 12, 2015
- Genre: Pop/Rock; Indie Pop; Lo-Fi
- Length: 35:51
- Label: Double Double Whammy

Professional ratings
Review scores
Source	Rating
Pitchfork	7.5/10.0

O.K. is the second album by Gabrielle Smith, released under the moniker Eskimeaux, now known as Gabby's World. Many of the songs first appeared on Igluenza, a collection of demos. The sound and feel of the album is described as dreamy, encouraging and hazy. The album is inspired by Xiu Xiu, Gowns, Mount Eerie, Tegan and Sara and Taylor Swift.

== Track listing ==
No.	Title	Music	Length
1.	"Folly"	Gabrielle Smith	2:13
2.	"Broken Necks"	Power Animal; Gabrielle Smith	3:16
3.	"I Admit I'm Scared"	Gabrielle Smith	3:48
4.	"The Thunder Answered Back"	Gabrielle Smith	5:23
5.	"Pocket Full of Posies"	Gabrielle Smith	3:38
6.	"Sparrow"	Gabrielle Smith	2:56
7.	"Alone at the Party"	Gabrielle Smith	2:13
8.	"Thanks"	Gabrielle Smith	2:38
9.	"A Hug Too Long"	Gabrielle Smith	2:32
10.	"Everything You Love"	Gabrielle Smith	5:09
11.	"That's O.K."	Gabrielle Smith	2:05
Total length:			35:51

== Personnel ==
- Colin Alexander – Artwork, Design
- Susannah Cutler – Artwork
- Eskimeaux – Primary Artist
- Jack Greenleaf – Producer, Synthesizer
- Andrew Piccone – Photography
- Power Animal – Lyricist
- Gabrielle Smith – Composer, Lyricist
- Oliver Kalb - Vocals, Synthesizer
- Felix Walworth – Drums
- Nick Corbo - Guitar
- Mitski – vocals
