= Sharpless (band) =

American indie rock band

Sharpless is an American indie rock band from Brooklyn, New York.

== History ==
Sharpless began as the solo project of Jack Greenleaf, who first released their music while attending school at Columbia College Chicago. In 2011, Greenleaf self-released his first album, which he titled Sharpless (+<). After releasing the album, Greenleaf began working on the follow-up. The second album, titled The One I Wanted To Be, was released on May 12, 2014. For the second album, Greenleaf enlisted other people to assist in the creation of the album, most notably being Montana Levy, who provided vocals to numerous songs on the album. Despite enlisting others to help with the album, Greenleaf did most of the recording at home with just a microphone, MIDI controller, and the application Logic Pro. The album was named one of five "overlooked albums" in 2014 by Brooklyn Magazine. The title of the band comes from the Italian Opera Madama Butterfly. After the release of the album, Sharpless signed to Father/Daughter Records, where they reissued the album and gave it a wider release.

Sharpless was a part of the musical collective known as The Epoch, which comprised bands such as Bellows, Gabby's World, Small Wonder, and Told Slant.
