= Too Much Sugar (film) =

2026 American documentary film

- Directed by: Robert Greene
- Produced by: Robert Kolodny; Bennett Elliott; Peter Kline; Alex Needles
- Cinematography: Robert Kolodny
- Edited by: Robert Greene
- Music by: Wilkie Davis Greene; Ramin Kousha
- Production companies: WW7 Studios; Do Something Real; Field of Vision; Method M Films
- Release date: September 3, 2026 (Venice)
- Running time: 98 minutes
- Country: United States
- Language: English

Too Much Sugar is a 2026 American documentary film directed and edited by Robert Greene. It follows Ryan “Holli-wood” Hollinger, a formerly incarcerated amateur MMA fighter and father of six in Moberly, Missouri as he tries to keep his family together.

The film had its world premiere in the Orizzonti section of the 83rd Venice International Film Festival on September 3, 2026.

== Synopsis ==
An affectionate portrait of a working class family in a Missouri town. An exuberant, if not overbearing, Ryan Holliger works construction with his best friend Michael "AccRite" Midgyett. Holliger spent six years of his life in prison and has amassed six children by five different women, by, in his own words "being a loose canon". Midgyett is mourning the loss of his own son, at the hands of gun violence. The film explains in text at the start that Robert Greene met Holliger at a basketball game both of their sons were playing in. Ryan has long wanted to make a movie based on his family life. Greene agreed to help in as well as document the process. Ryan's long suffering partner Amanda Sanner is also featured in the film as well as Ryan's sons, Tray, Gavin, Hank and Wade as well as his sole daughter Bonnie. Throughout the course of the film, Ryan and AccRite write scenes for fictional films that the documentarians then capture for them. The personal and cinematic drama escalates as both Ryan and AccRite struggle to keep their families together.

Cast and crew of Too Much Sugar at the Venice Film Festival 2026.

== Cast ==
- Ryan Holliger
- Michael Midgyett
- Amanda Sanner
- Gavin Jones
- Wayde Holliger
- Bonnie Holliger
- Hank Holliger
- Tray Martin
- Candy Woods
- Ashley Long
- Auveon Jackson

== Production ==
=== Development ===
According to Robert Greene, the film is the next step in the collaborative, therapeutic documentary cinema developed by he and his filmmaking team, primarily his long time producer Bennett Elliott and oft-collaborator Robert Kolodny. The film was shot in and around the town of Moberly, Missouri over the course of the year. Throughout the film the seasons change as the family continues to struggle through their daily lives. Greene said of the energy in the film, "His energy is just so aggressive and forward-moving. I think we were simply trying to capture what he brings to the table, and that energy is represented in the way we shot it, the way we edited it, and the way we brought everything to life".

The film finds Robert Greene continuing down the path of utilizing therapy and collaboration as a cinematic tool.

=== Filming ===
The film was shot using bare bones equipment and staging scenes with natural light, mirrors, foil, mylar and construction site work lights. Producer and cinematographer Robert Kolodny stated "Too Much Sugar was shot using tools of necessity and limitation, and this is a good thing. A joyous thing. We had no budget for this film — not hyperbolic, quite literal."

=== Title ===
The title comes from when Holliger was a hyperactive child and adolescent, "having fights on every street corner" and his mother told him , "Boy, you have too much sugar".

== Release ==
The film had its world premiere at the 83rd Venice International Film Festival on September 3, 2026, as part of the Orizzonti section. Cinetic Media will handle sales.

== Reception ==
Reviews for the film were primarily positive with many critics praising the human and collaboration of the film, with Guy Lodge from Variety writing, "As Greene gives each participant liberty to make a short film of their choosing, and edits the results into a single spiraling, shape-shifting family portrait."

Other reviews focused on the hybrid nature of the film, with Matt Zoller Seitz writing for RogerEbert.com saying that "Calling filmmaker Robert Greene and his regular cinematographer Robert Kolodny documentarians doesn’t feel quite right. But there isn’t another word that precisely describes the merger of fiction, nonfiction, experimentation, and social work that has defined so much of their output."
