= Cende =

- Origin: Brooklyn, New York
- Genres: Indie rock
- Years active: 2015–2017, 2023-2024
- Label: Double Double Whammy
- Spinoffs: Soft Surface, Dust Star

Cende was an American indie rock band from Brooklyn, New York. The group consisted of singer and guitarist Cameron Wisch, drummer Greg Rutkin, bassist Bernard Casserly and guitarist Dave Medina.

== History ==
The group began under the name "Downies", releasing their debut EP under the name. After the release, the group changed their name to Cende, as a reference someone wearing a flannel shirt over a Descendents shirt, making only the letters cende visible. In 2017, Cende released their debut album titled #1 Hit Song through Double Double Whammy. The album was listed at number 27 on Paste Magazine's list of "The 40 Best Punk Albums of the 2010s".

== Discography ==
Studio albums

- #1 Hit Song (2017, Double Double Whammy)

EPs

- EP (2015, Steakhouse Records)
