= Jellywish =

Studio album by Florist
- Released: April 4, 2025
- Genre: Folk
- Length: 33:33
- Label: Double Double Whammy
- Producer: Florist

Florist chronology
Florist (2022)	Jellywish (2025)

Singles from Jellywish
- 1. "This Was a Gift" Released: October 1, 2024; 2. "Have Heaven" Released: January 14, 2025; 3. "Gloom Designs" Released: February 10, 2025; 4. "Moon, Sea, Devil" Released: March 10, 2025; 5. "Jellyfish" Released: April 1, 2025

Jellywish is the fifth studio album by American indie folk band Florist. It was released on April 4, 2025, by Double Double Whammy.

The first release by the band since its self-titled fourth album in 2022, it was preceded by five singles released between October 2024 and April 2025. It was given favorable ratings by publications such as online music magazine Pitchfork and London-based magazine The Line of Best Fit.

== Background ==
Consisting of ten songs ranging between two and four minutes each, the album centers on the themes of mortality, grief and existential crisis in society related by the band's lead vocalist Emily Sprague's experiences and depression, and embodies an intangible idea of the jellyfish, from which the album title was derived.

The first single, "This Was a Gift", was released on October 1, 2024, while the subsequent singles were released in each of the first months of 2025. The second single, "Have Heaven", was released on January 14, 2025. The third and fourth singles, "Gloom Designs" and "Moon, Sea, Devil", were released on February 10, 2025, and March 10, 2025, respectively. The fifth and final single, "Jellyfish", was released on April 1, 2025, several days prior to the album's release.

== Critical reception ==
Professional ratings
Aggregate scores
Source	Rating
Metacritic	80/100
Review scores
Source	Rating
AllMusic	4/5 stars
New Noise Magazine	3.5/5 stars
The Line of Best Fit	8/10 stars
Paste	7.8/10
Pitchfork	8.1/10
Uncut	8/10

Jellywish received positive reviews from critics. At Metacritic, which assigns a normalized rating out of 100 to reviews from mainstream critics, the album received an average score of 80 based on seven reviews, indicating "generally favorable reviews".

Marcy Donelson of AllMusic noted in her review that Jellywish is "so often profound and not just sad or mindful" due to "a combination of candid simplicity and hints of the supernatural." Pitchfork's Aimee Cliff rated the album 8.1 out of ten, stating "Embracing a playful, almost hallucinogenic sound, the indie-folk band suffuses its fifth album with wide-eyed awe at everyday miracles." In her review for Uncut, Sharon O'Connell praised the "tender" instrumentation and Emily Sprague's lyrics for their "frank, ostensibly troubling yet dreamy observations about the business of being human".

Paste's Olivia Abercrombie assigned the album a rating of 7.8 out of ten, describing it as "a minimalist folk wonderland, making time for flourishes of robust instrumentalism and deeply meditative lyrics tilting towards life's one certainty: uncertainty." Oscar Ortega of New Noise Magazine remarked that "Each track wanders through sporadic yet interconnected images of nature and everything in life that goes unnoticed," and rated Jellywish 3.5 out of five. Writing for The Line of Best Fit, John Amen gave the album a rating of eight out of ten, stating "Sprague expresses consternation, curiosity, and gratitude via laconic lyrics, enrolling melodies, and sincere vocals". He concluded, "Jellywish includes some of her most intimate work. As a listener, it’s as if you’re being privately serenaded during an exquisite chemical sunset".

== Composition ==
The album's primary instrumentation includes the guitar and piano. The opening song "Levitate", performed with the acoustic guitar, was noted as a gentle track, while the composition of the second song "Have Heaven" includes drums, electronic instrumentation, and various effects.

The third track "Jellyfish", incorporating elements of indie folk, was described as an acoustic big picture song together with the eighth song in the album, "Moon, Sea, Devil", due to their lyrics of broad perspective questions, while the fourth song "Started to Glow" was comparatively noted as more introspective due to its theme encompassing suicide. "This Was a Gift", the fifth song described as a song addressing heartbreak as a necessity of love, was performed with the electric guitar. The sixth track "All the Same Light" is an acoustic ballad, while the seventh song "Sparkle Song" was described as being about gratitude and affection, and using fingerstyle guitar.

The ninth song "Our Hearts in a Room" introduces a perspective of Sprague on family and community, the same as the closing track "Gloom Designs", that portrays Sprague in a conversation with her mother in spirit form.

== Track listing ==
All tracks are written by Emily Sprague.

Jellywish track listing
No.	Title	Length
1.	"Levitate"	2:49
2.	"Have Heaven"	3:08
3.	"Jellyfish"	2:55
4.	"Started to Glow"	3:37
5.	"This Was a Gift"	3:22
6.	"All the Same Light"	3:46
7.	"Sparkle Song"	3:26
8.	"Moon, Sea, Devil"	2:16
9.	"Our Hearts in a Room"	3:56
10.	"Gloom Designs"	4:18
Total length:		33:33

== Personnel ==
Credits adapted from Tidal.

=== Florist ===
- Jonnie Baker – guitar, production, arrangements
- Rick Spataro – bass guitar, production, mixing, recording, arrangements
- Emily Sprague – vocals, guitar, production, arrangements, piano on "This Was a Gift"
- Felix Walworth – drums, production, arrangements

=== Additional contributors ===
- Josh Bonati – mastering
- Alex P. Wernquest – mixing
- Vera Haddad – artwork
