= Allegra (given name) =

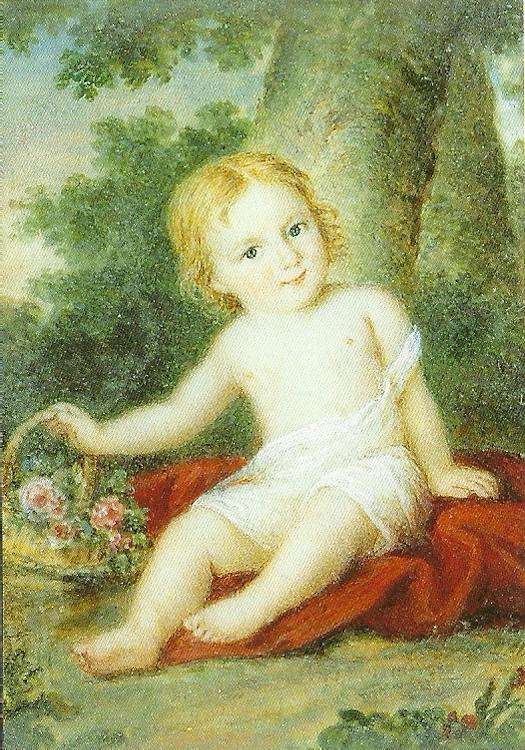
- The story of Allegra Byron (1817–1822), "Lord Byron's Allegra", has been one inspiration for use of the name.
- Pronunciation: /əˈlɛɡrə/ Italian: [alˈlɛːɡra]
- Gender: female
- Language: Italian

Origin
- Meaning: Joyful, Lively

Allegra (/əˈlɛɡrə/; Italian: [alˈleːɡra]) is a female given name of Italian origin meaning joyful (happy) or lively. It was first used as a name in the medieval era in Italy.

Allegra can refer to:

- Allegra Acosta (born 2002), American actress and singer
- Allegra Byron (1817–1822), the illegitimate daughter of British Romantic poet George Gordon, Lord Byron and Claire Clairmont, the stepsister of Mary Shelley
- Allegra Collins (born 1972), American attorney, educator and judge
- Allegra Curtis (born 1966), American actress
- Allegra de Laurentiis, Italian philosopher
- Allegra Edwards (born 1988), American actress
- Allegra Eggleston (1860–1933), American artist
- Allegra Fuller Snyder (1927–2021), American film director and dance ethnographer; daughter of R. Buckminster Fuller
- Allegra Fulton, Canadian actress
- Allegra Goodman (born 1967), American author
- Allegra Huston (born 1964), British-American author
- Allegra Hyde, American writer
- Allegra Kent (born 1937), American ballet dancer
- Allegra Krieger, American indie rock musician
- Allegra Lapi (born 1985), Italian water polo player
- Allegra McEvedy (born 1970), British chef
- Allegra Mertz (1913–1989), American sailor
- Allegra Mostyn-Owen (born 1964), British journalist and teacher
- Allegra Poljak (born 1999), Serbian footballer
- Allegra Spender (born 1978), Australian businesswoman and politician
- Allegra Stratton (born 1980), British journalist
- Allegra Versace (born 1986), heiress to the fashion house Versace

== Fictional characters ==
- Allegra (comics)
- Allegra, the main character on the 1994–1996 Nick Jr. television series Allegra's Window
- Allegra Coleman, character who is a celebrity
- Allegra Geller, character in the 1999 film eXistenZ
- Allegra Zane, character in the 2002 television series Galidor: Defenders of the Outer Dimension
- Allegra Pazzi, character in the 2001 film Hannibal
- Allegra Cole, character in the 2005 film Hitch (film)
- Allegra Sacrimoni, a character in the HBO series The Sopranos
- Allegra Garcia, a DC Comics character
- Valentina Allegra de Fontaine, a Marvel Comics character
- Allegra Riganti, a character in the 2006 television series Alma Pirata
