= True Love (Hovvdy album) =

Studio album by Hovvdy
- Released: October 1, 2021
- Genres: Indie rock, indie pop
- Length: 39:03
- Label: Grand Jury Music
- Producer: Andrew Sarlo

Hovvdy chronology
Heavy Lifter (2019)	True Love (2021)	Hovvdy (2024)

Professional ratings
Aggregate scores
Source	Rating
AnyDecentMusic?	7.1/10
Metacritic	76/100
Review scores
Source	Rating
DIY	4/4
Exclaim!	8/10
Loud and Quiet	6/10
Paste	8.4/10
Pitchfork	7.2/10
PopMatters	7/10
Under the Radar	7.0/10

True Love is the fourth full-length album from American indie pop duo Hovvdy. The album was released on October 1, 2021, via Grand Jury Music.

== Track listing ==
All tracks are written by Charlie Martin and Will Taylor.

Crocus track listing
No.	Title	Length
1.	"Sometimes"	1:17
2.	"True Love"	4:11
3.	"Lake June"	2:34
4.	"GSM"	3:31
5.	"Around Again"	3:28
6.	"Hope"	2:41
7.	"Joy"	3:34
8.	"One Bottle"	3:09
9.	"Blindsided"	3:42
10.	"Hue"	2:57
11.	"Junior Fay League"	3:23
12.	"I Never Wanna Make You Sad"	4:33
Total length:		39:03
