= Beyond the Fleeting Gales =

Studio album by Crying
- Released: 14 October 2016
- Studios: Seaside Lounge, Brooklyn
- Genres: Power pop; stadium rock
- Length: 34:14
- Label: Run for Cover

Singles from Beyond the Fleeting Gales
- 1. "Patriot" Released: 24 March 2015; 2. "Wool in the Wash" Released: 24 August 2016; 3. "Revive" Released: 12 September 2016; 4. "There Was a Door" Released: 11 October 2016

Beyond the Fleeting Gales is the only studio album by American rock band Crying. It was released on 14 October 2016 on Run for Cover Records.

== Background ==
Prior to the release of their debut album, Crying had released two EPs on Run for Cover that heavily featured Galloway playing a Game Boy as an instrument. Their band name, and the use of the Game Boy, led to genre labels of chiptune and emo for Crying. Beyond the Fleeting Gales was considered a departure in style, with the band citing the influence of 1970s and 80s progressive rock bands such as Yes, Emerson, Lake & Palmer and Genesis.

"Patriot" was first released as a standalone single in March 2015. The singles "Wool in the Wash", "Revive", and "There Was a Door" were released in August, September, and October 2016, respectively.

== Themes ==
Santos said that "'Gales' is a word that I’ve used that goes in two directions: wind or the sound of laughter. There's a lot of transience on the record because we’re at a transitional point in our lives." She described "Revive" as "a tribute to the early stages of my relationships, to this project and other special people in my life, but also a wake-up call for myself to keep up and look out for transformations instead of losses."

== Critical reception ==
Professional ratings
Aggregate scores
Source	Rating
Metacritic	76/100
Review scores
Source	Rating
AllMusic	3.5/5 stars
No Ripcord	7/10
Pitchfork	7.1/10
punknews.org (Staff)	3.5/5 stars
Tiny Mix Tapes	5/5 marks

On Metacritic the album holds a score of 76/100, based on 5 reviews, indicating a "generally favorable" reception.

Several reviews praised the change in style from Crying's earlier EPs. The Village Voice wrote that "with their debut album...Crying have become an altogether different-sounding — and gimmick-free — band." NPR called the album "a sonic watershed, trading in a Gameboy for synths and ditching punk for pop. This is full-blown stadium rock." Pitchfork noted "the big-screen bombast of mainstream '80s rock", and Galloway acknowledged the influence of prog rock band Rush on his guitar playing.

== Track listing ==
No.	Title	Length
1.	"Premonitory Dream"	03:06
2.	"Wool in the Wash"	03:56
3.	"Patriot"	03:10
4.	"Origin"	02:37
5.	"Well and Spring"	03:20
6.	"A Sudden Gust"	02:55
7.	"There Was a Door"	04:14
8.	"Revive"	02:59
9.	"Children of the Wind"	04:11
10.	"The Curve"	03:41
Total length:		34:14

== Personnel ==
Personnel per insert.

- Elaiza Santos – vocals, lyrics
- Ryan Galloway – guitar, synth programming, music
- Nick Corbo – drums, percussion
- Laetitia Tamko – vocals on "There Was a Door"

Technical

- Mike Ditrio – recording, mixing (Seaside Lounge Recording Studios, Brooklyn)
- Carl Saff - mastering
- Ryan Galloway, Emily Sprague – additional recording

Artistic

- Ryan Galloway – cover art
- Elaiza Santos – insert
