= M for Empathy =

Studio album by Lomelda
- Released: March 1, 2019
- Label: Double Double Whammy

Lomelda chronology
Thx (2017)	M for Empathy (2019)	Covers EP (2019)

Professional ratings
Review scores
Source	Rating
Exclaim!	7/10
Pitchfork	7.6/10

M for Empathy is the third studio album by musician Hannah Read under the name Lomelda. It was released in March 2019 under Double Double Whammy.

== Track listing ==
No.	Title	Length
1.	"Talk"	01:10
2.	"Bust"	01:31
3.	"Bunk"	01:22
4.	"M for Magic"	01:16
5.	"M for Mush"	01:45
6.	"Tell"	01:49
7.	"So Bad 1, Girl"	01:14
8.	"Slide"	01:16
9.	"So Bad 2 Care"	01:11
10.	"M for Me"	02:42
11.	"Watering"	00:47
