= Emily Alone =

Studio album by Florist
- Released: 26 July 2019
- Recorded: Winter 2018
- Length: 39:42
- Label: Double Double Whammy

Florist chronology
If Blue Could Be Happiness (2017)	Emily Alone (2019)	Florist (2022)

Emily Alone is the third record by folk band Florist, released through Double Double Whammy on 26 July 2019. Although Florist is a collaborative project, the record was written and recorded solely by Florist member Emily A. Sprague, who also has ambient solo music released under her own name.

== Background ==
Sprague grew up in New York, and Florist were originally based in Brooklyn, where they released their first two albums in 2016 and 2017 on Double Double Whammy. In 2017 Sprague moved across the country to Los Angeles, in response to what she described as a need "to go somewhere drastically different to discover new parts of myself." In California she started recording ambient music, and releasing it as a solo artist.

Sprague recorded Emily Alone at her home in LA in the winter of 2018. She told Stereogum that she was "incredibly depressed for the first six months to a year that I lived [in LA]. Writing the album was the thing that finally was the culmination of all those feelings, the thing that finally released it all."

== Critical reception ==
Professional ratings
Aggregate scores
Source	Rating
AnyDecentMusic?	7.9/10
Metacritic	87/100
Review scores
Source	Rating
AllMusic	4/5 stars
No Ripcord	7/10
Paste	9.2/10
Pitchfork	8.4/10

Emily Alone was released to critical acclaim. On Metacritic, it holds a score of 87 out of 100, indicating "universal acclaim", based on five reviews. Jenn Pelly of Pitchfork called the album "dark, acoustic, and bracingly metaphysical...the most striking Florist release yet."

== Track listing ==
No.	Title	Length
1.	"As Alone"	04:02
2.	"Moon Begins"	03:05
3.	"Celebration"	04:27
4.	"I Also Have Eyes"	04:16
5.	"Ocean Arms"	03:34
6.	"Time Is A Dark Feeling"	02:36
7.	"M"	02:46
8.	"Now"	03:01
9.	"Rain Song"	03:35
10.	"Still"	01:17
11.	"Shadow Bloom"	03:40
12.	"Today I'll Have You Around"	03:22
Total length:		39:42

== Personnel ==
- Emily Sprague – layout, design, writing, recording
- Josh Bonati – mastering
- Phil Hartunian – additional mixing
- Carley Solether – cover photography
