= Allegra Byron =

Daughter of Lord Byron (1817–1822)

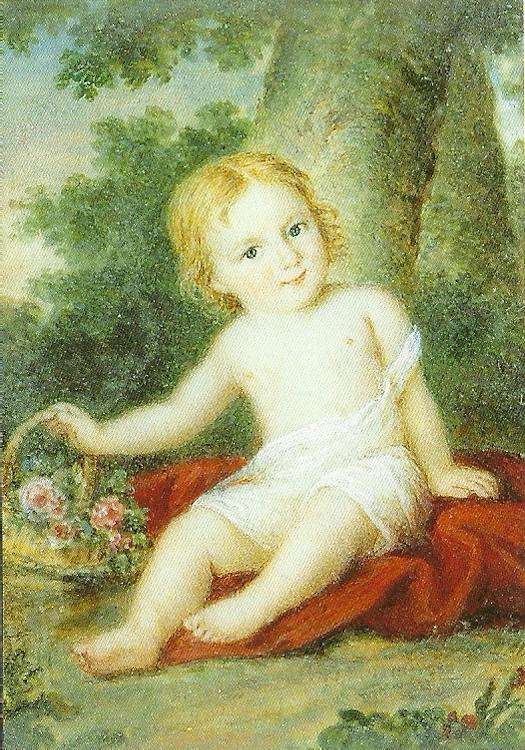
- Born: Alba Byron; 13 January 1817; Bath, England
- Died: 20 April 1822 (aged 5); Bagnacavallo, Papal States
- Parents: George Gordon, Lord Byron; Claire Clairmont

Clara Allegra Byron (12 January 1817 – 20 April 1822) was the illegitimate daughter of the poet George Gordon, Lord Byron, and Claire Clairmont.

Born in Bath, England, she was initially named Alba, meaning "dawn", or "white", by her mother. At first she lived with her mother, her mother's stepsister, Mary Shelley, and Mary's husband Percy Bysshe Shelley. When she was fifteen months old, she was turned over to Byron, who changed her name to Allegra. Byron placed her with foster families and later in a Roman Catholic convent, where she died at the age of five of typhus or malaria.

== Early life ==
Allegra was the product of a short-lived affair between the Romantic poet and her starstruck teenage mother, who was living in reduced circumstances in the household of her stepsister and brother-in-law. Clairmont wrote to Byron during the pregnancy begging him to write back and promise to take care of her and the baby; however, Byron ignored her pleas. After her birth, she was initially taken into the household of Leigh Hunt as the child of a cousin. A few months later, the Shelleys and Clairmont took the baby back as an "adopted" child. Clairmont bonded with her baby daughter and wrote in her journal with delight about her close, physical connection with little Allegra, but she was also dealing with emotional and financial pressures from the Shelleys that made it difficult for her to keep the baby with her.

The Shelleys were fond of Allegra, but Mary Shelley feared that neighbours would believe Percy Bysshe Shelley had fathered her as the truth about her relationship to Clairmont leaked out. William Godwin, Mary's father and Clairmont's stepfather, had immediately leapt to that conclusion when he learned of Allegra's birth. In an October 1817 letter to Percy Bysshe Shelley, Mary Shelley remarked that their toddler son William disliked Allegra, but was fond of his baby sister Clara. She saw her son's reaction to Allegra, who was no blood relation to him, as "an argument in favour of those who advocate instinctive natural affection". In addition, the Shelleys were constantly in debt and Mary Shelley wanted the baby to be sent to Byron and wanted her difficult and temperamental stepsister, who had too close a relationship with her husband, to leave her house.

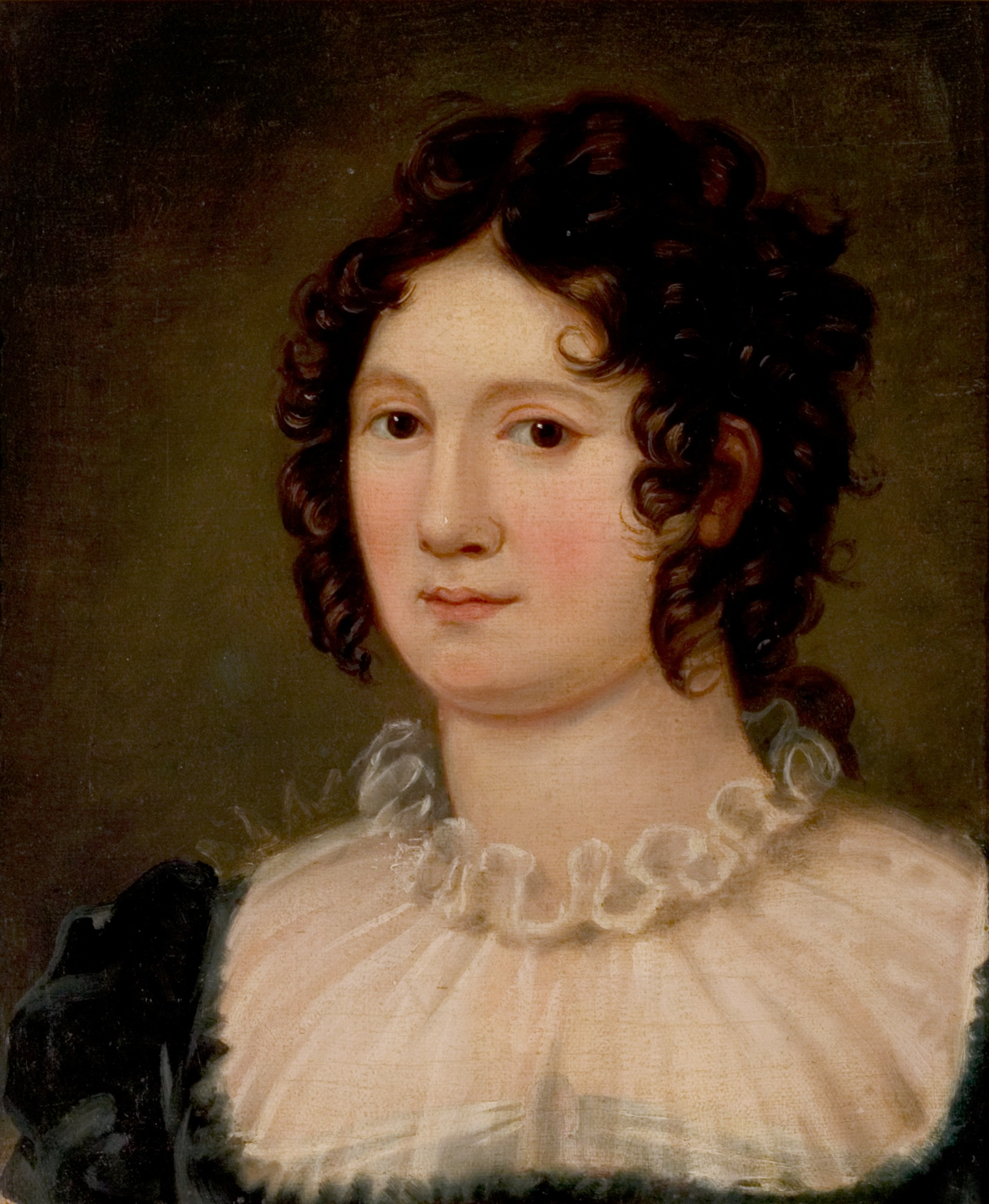
Claire Clairmont

After the child's birth, Shelley wrote to Byron "of the exquisite symmetry" and beauty of "a little being whom we ... call Alba, or the Dawn." He asked Byron what his plans were for the child. Later, Shelley acknowledged the child's presence was becoming something of an embarrassment. Byron asked his half-sister Augusta Leigh to take Allegra into her household, but Leigh refused. Hostile to Clairmont and initially sceptical that he had fathered her daughter, Byron agreed to take custody of Allegra under the condition that her mother have only limited contact with her. Shelley warned Clairmont that this might not, after all, be the best plan for Allegra, but Clairmont hoped that her daughter would be more financially comfortable and would have a better chance at a good life if she lived with her father. "I have sent you my child because I love her too well to keep her", she wrote to Byron.

Byron requested that her name be changed from Alba, which also related to "Albé", Clairmont's nickname for Byron, to Allegra, an Italian name meaning "cheerful, brisk" and relating to the musical term "allegro". During the journey to turn the child over to Byron, Clairmont wrote in her journal that she had bathed her daughter in Dover, but then crossed the passage out, as if afraid to mention the baby's name. The child was baptised with the name Clara Allegra before her mother relinquished her to Byron. Byron discussed spelling Allegra's surname as "Biron" instead of as "Byron" to further distinguish her from his legitimate daughter, Augusta Ada Byron. Byron offered to pay Shelley for the expense of Allegra's upkeep during her first months of life, but Shelley indignantly refused and said the cost was a trifle.

== Resemblances to Byron ==
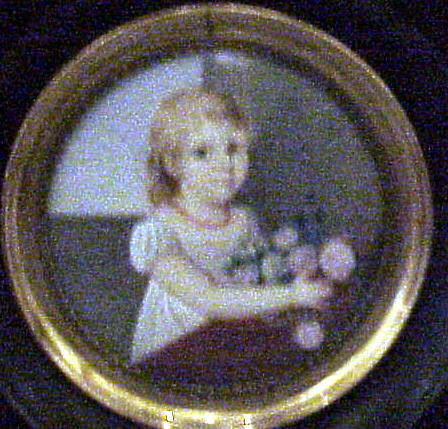
Clara Allegra Byron

Mary Shelley had called the baby Allegra "the little Commodore" because of her sturdy body and alert, intelligent look. Byron was also pleased with Allegra's resemblances to himself in appearance and temperament. When she was eighteen months old, he wrote in a letter to a friend: "My bastard came three days ago—very like—healthy—noisy & capricious." In an 1818 letter to his half-sister Augusta Leigh, Byron wrote that "She is very pretty — remarkably intelligent ... She has very blue eyes — that singular forehead — fair curly hair — and a devil of a spirit. but that is Papa's."

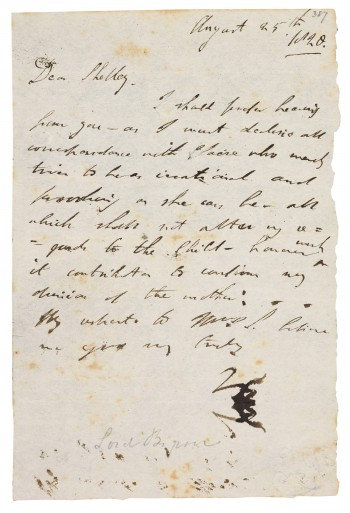
1820 letter from Lord Byron to Shelley concerning Allegra

In 1819, in another letter to Leigh, Byron described two and a half-year-old Allegra as "very droll" and again commented on her resemblance to himself in physical appearance, temperament and interests: "(She) has a very good deal of the Byron. Can't articulate the letter 'r' at all—frowns and pouts quite in our way—blue eyes—light hair growing darker daily—and a dimple in the chin—a scowl on the brow—white skin—sweet voice—and a particular liking of Music—and of her own way in every thing—ah, is that not B. all over?" The child had forgotten any English she had learned and now spoke only Venetian Italian.

In March 1820, he complained in a letter that three-year-old Allegra was quite vain and "obstinate as a mule". Her behaviour was sometimes unmanageable, probably as a result of her unstable living arrangements and frequent changes in caregivers. At the age of four, the naughty child terrorised Byron's servants with her spectacular temper tantrums and other misbehaviour and told frequent lies.

As she grew older, Allegra also demonstrated a talent for acting and singing. Teresa, Contessa Guiccioli, who was Lord Byron's lover while he was living in Ravenna and whom Allegra called "mammina", remarked on Allegra's talent for mimicking the servants and for singing popular songs. Byron felt her talent for mimicry, another talent she shared with him, might amuse other people in the short term but would eventually be a cause of trouble for her.

== Convent education ==
Shelley, who visited the toddler Allegra while she was being boarded with a family chosen by Byron, objected to the child's living arrangements over the years, though he had initially approved of Clairmont's plan to relinquish her to her father. During the summer of 1819, Allegra stayed with four different families and was abandoned by her nursemaid. Byron sent her to stay for long periods with his friend British consul Richard Belgrave Hoppner and his wife, who sent her to stay with three other families in as many months. Hoppner did not like Allegra. However, Hoppner's wife wrote to Shelley that they had grown worried because Allegra had grown quiet and serious while they cared for her. Byron demonstrated care for his daughter as well. He dismissed a servant who had allowed Allegra to fall. He also drafted a codicil to his will in which he bequeathed to her five thousand pounds.

Though he originally agreed to permit Clairmont to visit their daughter, Byron reneged on the agreement. Shelley often tried to persuade Byron to let Clairmont see her daughter and they thought of ways to regain custody of her. Clairmont was alarmed by reports in 1820 that her daughter had suffered a malarial-type fever and that Byron had moved her to warm Ravenna at the height of the summer.

Clairmont wrote that Allegra must be moved to a more healthy climate if she were to survive and pleaded with Byron to send their daughter to her in Bagni di Lucca, a town with a cool mountain climate. However, Byron didn't want to send Allegra back to be raised in the Shelley household, where he was sure she'd grow ill from eating a vegetarian diet and would be taught atheism. He pointed out that all of the other children in the Shelley household had died: the Shelleys' first three children had all died young. Byron believed the rumours that a fourth child, Elena Adelaide Shelley, was Clairmont's daughter by Shelley and Allegra's half-sister. Elena died in a foster home in 1820 aged seventeen months.

Shelley wrote to his wife Mary that Allegra looked pale and quiet when he saw her in 1818. When he saw her again in August 1821 at the Capuchin Convent of Saint Giovanni in Bagnacavallo, a boarding school attended by the daughters of the nobility, he again felt she looked too pale. Allegra was tall and slender for her age, with curly blonde hair, blue eyes and delicate features. She moved gracefully. She wore a white muslin dress with a black silk apron and drawers. During her three-hour visit with Shelley, she showed him the bed where she slept, the chair where she ate dinner, and the little carriage that she and her best friend used during their strolls in the garden. "I had brought her a basket of sweetmeats, and before eating any of them she gave her friends and all the nuns a portion", Shelley wrote. Shelley was infuriated by the Roman Catholic education she was receiving, though he had initially told Byron he approved of her being sent to a convent. Allegra now knew certain prayers by heart."(Besides) Paradise & angels ... she has a prodigious list of saints—and is always talking of the Bambino ... The idea of bringing up so sweet a creature in the midst of such trash till Sixteen!" he wrote.

After five months in the convent school, her behaviour had also improved; she obeyed the nuns readily and was well-disciplined, though Shelley didn't think the nuns had been too severe with her. Though Shelley thought the little girl was more serious and contemplative than he remembered, he said she had not lost her "excessive vivacity". The nuns did not scold her when Allegra played a prank on them during Shelley's visit. Some of the nuns had hidden from view while Shelley, who was playing with Allegra, raced about the convent. Allegra then rang the bell that was used to call the nuns to assemble and the prioress had to quickly tell the nuns to remain where they were so they did not come out in a state of disarray.

At the end of the visit, Allegra asked Shelley to "tell her mother she wanted a kiss and a gold dress and would he please beg her Papa and Mammina to visit her." Allegra no longer had any real memory of Clairmont, but had grown attached to "her Mammina", Byron's mistress Teresa, Countess Guiccioli, who had mothered her. Teresa gave the little girl her own childhood toys and played with her when she spent weeks recovering from a childhood illness.

Clairmont had always opposed Byron's decision to send Allegra to a convent, and shortly after the move, she wrote him a furious, condemnatory letter accusing him of breaking his promise that their daughter would never be apart from one of her parents. She felt that the physical conditions in convents were unhealthy and the education provided was poor and was responsible for "the state of ignorance & profligacy of Italian women, all pupils of Convents. They are bad wives & most unnatural mothers, licentious & ignorant they are the dishonour & unhappiness of society ... This step will procure to you an innumerable addition of enemies & of blame." In March 1822, she created a plan to kidnap her daughter from the convent and asked Shelley to forge a letter of permission from Byron. Shelley refused.

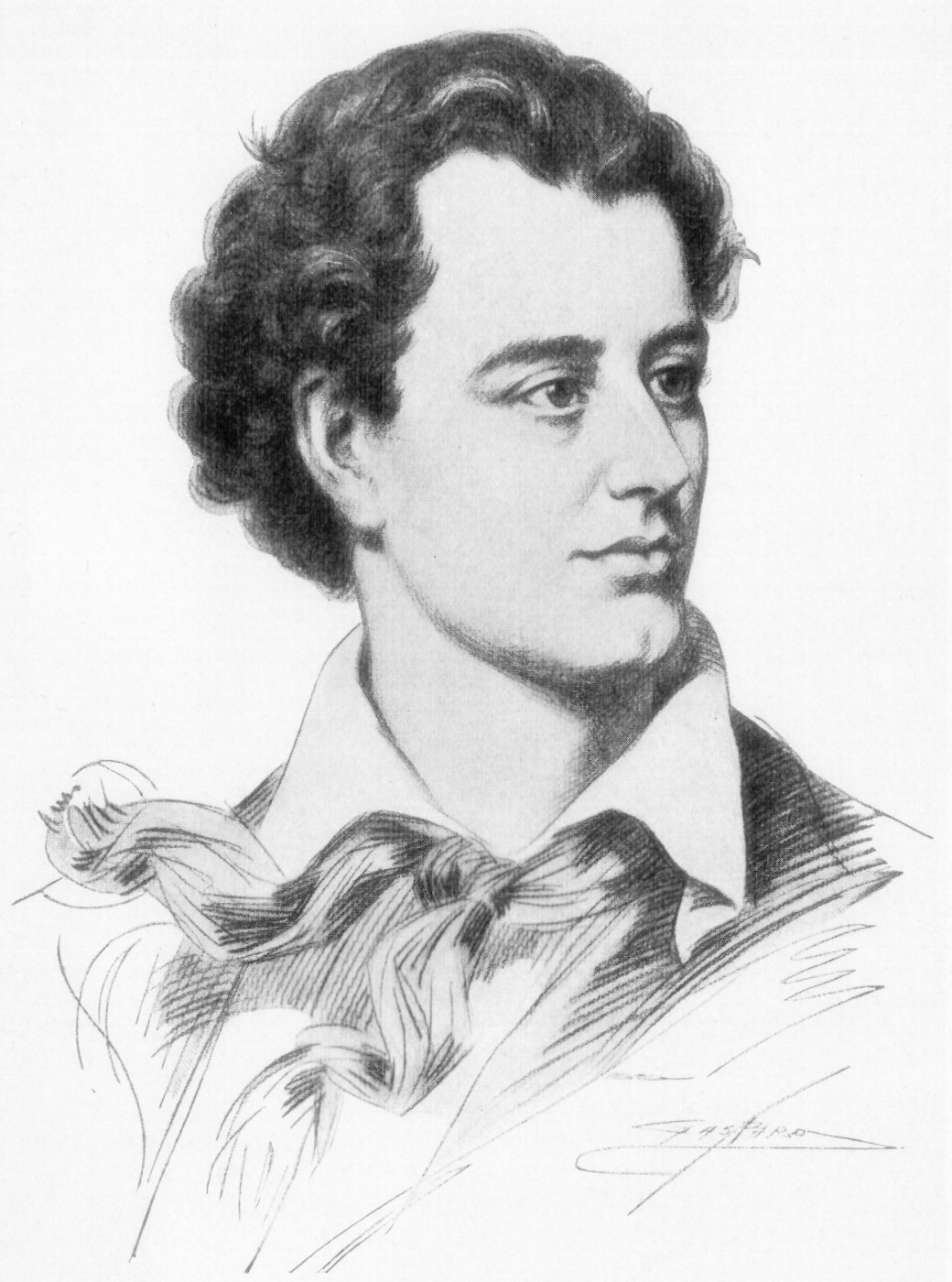
Lord Byron

Byron had arranged for Allegra to be educated in the convent precisely because he, unlike his former lover Clairmont, thought favourably of the manners and attitudes of Italian women who had received convent educations. He disapproved of what he called Clairmont's "loose morals" and "Bedlam behaviour" and didn't want her to influence Allegra. He also believed that his daughter, given her illegitimacy, would have a far better chance of marrying well in Italy than she would in England. A Roman Catholic girl with a suitable dowry, raised in a convent, would have a decent chance of marrying into high Italian society. He wanted the child to become a Roman Catholic, which he viewed as the "best religion". "If Claire thinks that she shall ever interfere with the child's morals or education, she mistakes; she never shall", wrote Byron in a letter to Richard Belgrave Hoppner in September 1820. "The girl shall be a Christian and a married woman, if possible." Her mother could see Allegra, he added, only with the "proper restrictions".

Byron had written to Clairmont that he paid double fees to the convent school to ensure that Allegra would receive the best possible care from the nuns. Byron wrote to Hoppner in March 1821 that Allegra would receive better care in the convent than she would with him. His mistress, Teresa, Countess Guiccioli, had had a happy experience at the convent boarding school where she had lived from the age of five, and had persuaded Byron that a convent school would be the best place for Allegra. He also viewed the convent as the safest place for her with revolution brewing in the Kingdom of the Two Sicilies.

Allegra was doted on by the nuns at the convent, who called her "Allegrina", and was visited once by Teresa's relatives. Probably with considerable assistance from the nuns, four-year-old Allegra wrote her father a letter in Italian from the convent, dated 21 September 1821, asking him to visit her:

My dear Papa. It being fair-time, I should like so much a visit from my Papa as I have many wishes to satisfy. Won't you come to please your Allegrina who loves you so?

The abbess of the convent included her own note inviting Byron to come to see Allegra before he left for Pisa and assuring him "how much she is loved". On the back of this letter, Byron wrote: "Sincere enough, but not very flattering – for she wants to see me because 'it is the fair' to get some paternal Gingerbread – I suppose." Byron never responded to Allegra's letter or visited the child during the thirteen months she was in the convent.

== Death ==
Allegra developed a high fever on 13 April 1822. The nuns called a doctor to see her, who determined that Allegra was suffering "little slow fevers". Her father was informed but Byron did not visit. He approved the use of any medical interventions deemed necessary. On 15 April, she was considered out of danger, but died on 20 April, attended by three doctors and all of the nuns at the convent, of what some biographers have identified as typhus.

Byron arranged to send her body to England and wrote an inscription for her gravestone that read: "In memory of Allegra, daughter of G.G., Lord Byron, who died at Bagna Cavallo in Italy, 20 April 1822, Aged Five Years and Three Months,-'I shall go to her, but she shall not return to me.'-2 Samuel, xii, 23"

Byron felt guilty about his neglect of the child after her death; he told Marguerite, Countess of Blessington, a few months afterwards:

Let the object of affection be snatched away by death, and how is all the pain ever inflicted upon them avenged! The same imagination that led us to slight or overlook their sufferings, now that they are forever lost to us, magnifies their estimable qualities ... How did I feel this when my daughter, Allegra, died! While she lived, her existence never seemed necessary to my happiness; but no sooner did I lose her, than it appeared to me as if I could not live without her.

Clairmont accused Byron of murdering Allegra and demanded that Byron send her a portrait of Allegra, a lock of the child's hair, and that she be placed in charge of the funeral arrangements. In the end, though, Clairmont could not bear to see Allegra's coffin or to hold a funeral service for her daughter. She blamed Byron for the rest of her life for Allegra's death.

Because of the child's illegitimacy, John William Cunningham, rector of St Mary's Church, Harrow on the Hill, refused to place a plaque on Allegra's grave; he permitted her only to be buried at the entrance of the church without a marker. Henry Drury conducted the funeral service. In 1980, The Byron Society placed a memorial plaque for Allegra at Harrow, inscribed with words from a letter Byron wrote to Shelley after her death: "I suppose that Time will do his usual work... – Death has done his."

It is possible that Allegra's body was not actually sent to England and that she was instead buried under an altar in the chapel of the Virgin of Lourdes at the convent, according to convent records only made public in 2020. Italian authorities might have refused to send the body overseas due to an epidemic in 1822. Other convent records suggest that the child's body was sent to England but the ship sank en route.

The memory of Allegra haunted Shelley; before his own death by drowning in July 1822, Shelley had a vision of the dead child in which she rose naked from the sea, laughed, clapped her hands, and beckoned to him. He also immortalised the toddler as Count Maddalo's child in his 1819 poem Julian and Maddalo: A Conversation:

A lovelier toy sweet Nature never made;
A serious, subtle, wild, yet gentle being;
Graceful without design, and unforeseeing;
With eyes – O speak not of her eyes! which seem
Twin mirrors of Italian heaven, yet gleam
With such deep meaning as we never see
But in the human countenance.

In the next stanza he imagines her grown to a woman: "A wonder of this earth ... Like one of Shakespeare's women."

== Sources ==
- Eisler, Benita, Byron: Child of Passion, Fool of Fame, Alfred A. Knopf, 1999, ISBN 0-679-41299-9
