= Skirts (musician) =

American musician

Skirts is the stage name of American musician Alex Montenegro.

== History ==
Montenegro began making music in 2017. In 2018, Montenegro released her first EP under the Skirts moniker titled Almost Touching. Montenegro grew up around music, both through her father and working at record stores during her teenage years. Montenegro released her debut full-length album as Skirts titled Great Big Wild Oak. The album was released through Double Double Whammy.

Skirts was named a “Band To Watch” by Stereogum in 2021, and was named a Best New Artist by Paste Magazine.
