= Hovvdy =

American indie pop duo

- Origin: Austin, Texas, U.S.
- Genres: Indie rock; slowcore
- Years active: 2014–present
- Labels: Arts & Crafts; Double Double Whammy; Specialist Subject
- Members: Charlie Martin; Will Taylor

Hovvdy (pronounced "howdy") is an American indie pop duo formed in Austin, Texas by Charlie Martin and Will Taylor.

== History ==
Hovvdy released their first EP in 2014. The following year, they released a split with the band Loafer. In 2016, the band released their debut full-length album, Taster, through Double Double Whammy. Hovvdy's second album, titled Cranberry, was released in 2018. In 2019, the duo released a split with musician Hannah Read, known as Lomelda. The two artists covered each other's songs for the release. The two also went on a summer tour to promote the album. Hovvdy's third album, Heavy Lifter, was released in 2019. The band's fourth album, True Love, was released on October 1, 2021. They released their self-titled fifth studio album through Arts & Crafts on April 26, 2024.

In May 2026, Hovvdy announced a new album titled Big World, set to release in August 2026.

== Band members ==
- Charlie Martin
- Will Taylor

== Discography ==
=== Albums ===
- Taster (Double Double Whammy, 2016)
- Cranberry (Double Double Whammy, 2018)
- Heavy Lifter (Double Double Whammy, 2019)
- True Love (Grand Jury Music, 2021)
- Hovvdy (Arts & Crafts, 2024)
- Big World (Arts & Crafts, 2026)

=== Extended plays ===
- EP (Drip Tapes/Merdurhaus, 2014)
- Stay Warm split with Loafer (Merdurhaus, 2015)
- Covers split with Lomelda (self-released, 2019)
- Covers 2 (self-released, 2021)
- Billboard for My Feelings (self-released, 2022)

=== Singles ===
- "Meg" (Merdurhaus, 2016)
- "Problem" (Merdurhaus, 2016)
- "Easy" / "Turns Blue" (Saddle Creek, 2018)
- "Runner" (self-released, 2020)
- "I'm Sorry" (self-released, 2020)
- "True Love" (Grand Jury, 2021)
- "Blindsided" (Grand Jury, 2021)
- "Everything" (Grand Jury, 2022)
- "Town" (Grand Jury, 2022)
- "Hide" (Grand Jury, 2022)
- "Ruby" (Grand Jury, 2022)
- "Jean" (Arts & Crafts, 2023)
- "Bubba" (Arts & Crafts, 2023)
- "Portrait" (Arts & Crafts, 2023)
- "Forever" (Arts & Crafts, 2024)
- "Meant" (Arts & Crafts, 2024)
- "Make Ya Proud" (Arts & Crafts, 2024)
