= Lomelda =

- Born: Hannah Read
- Origin: Silsbee, Texas, U.S.
- Genres: Folk, indie pop, indie rock
- Occupation: Musician
- Years active: 2015–present
- Label: Double Double Whammy

Lomelda is the stage name of musician Hannah Read. According to Read, Lomelda is a made-up word that means "echo of the stars".

== Career ==
Read was raised in Silsbee, Texas. She began her music career playing in bands with her brother and with high school friends. Read's first full-length album, Forever, was released in 2015. In 2017, she released her second full-length album, Thx, with the independent record label Double Double Whammy. The album was co-produced with Read's brother Tommy. It was written over a few months while Read was sleeping in her car. In July 2017, Stereogum named Lomelda one of their "Bands To Watch".

Her next album, M for Empathy, was released on March 1, 2019. Despite having 11 songs, the album clocks a total of 16 minutes. M for Empathy marked Read's emerging use of piano to add to her customary guitar-oriented songs, as the primary instrument for the song "Bunk" and prominent in other songs including "M for Magic" and "M for Mush".

Lomelda's next album, Hannah, was released on September 4, 2020, via Double Double Whammy. It received "Best New Music" from Pitchfork with a score of 8.3, calling the album "stunning" and saying that "The magic of Lomelda’s music is in that exchange, an infusion of strength and care from one person to another, no matter how small or ordinary. It has anchored Read’s songwriting from the beginning, and it is threaded throughout Hannah, which is warm and enveloping, like a hug." On the song "It's Lomelda", Read hints at artists that have influenced her music, including Low, The Innocence Mission, Frankie Cosmos, Frank Ocean, and Yo La Tengo.

== Discography ==
Studio albums

- Late Dawn Inheritance (2012)
- Forever (2015)
- 4e (2016)
- Thx (2017) - Double Double Whammy
- M for Empathy (2019) - Double Double Whammy
- Hannah (2020) - Double Double Whammy

EPs

- Covers (2019) (with Hovvdy) - Double Double Whammy

Compilation Tracks

- In Another Life (2024) (with More Eaze) - Red Hot Organization
