= Told Slant =

American indie folk band

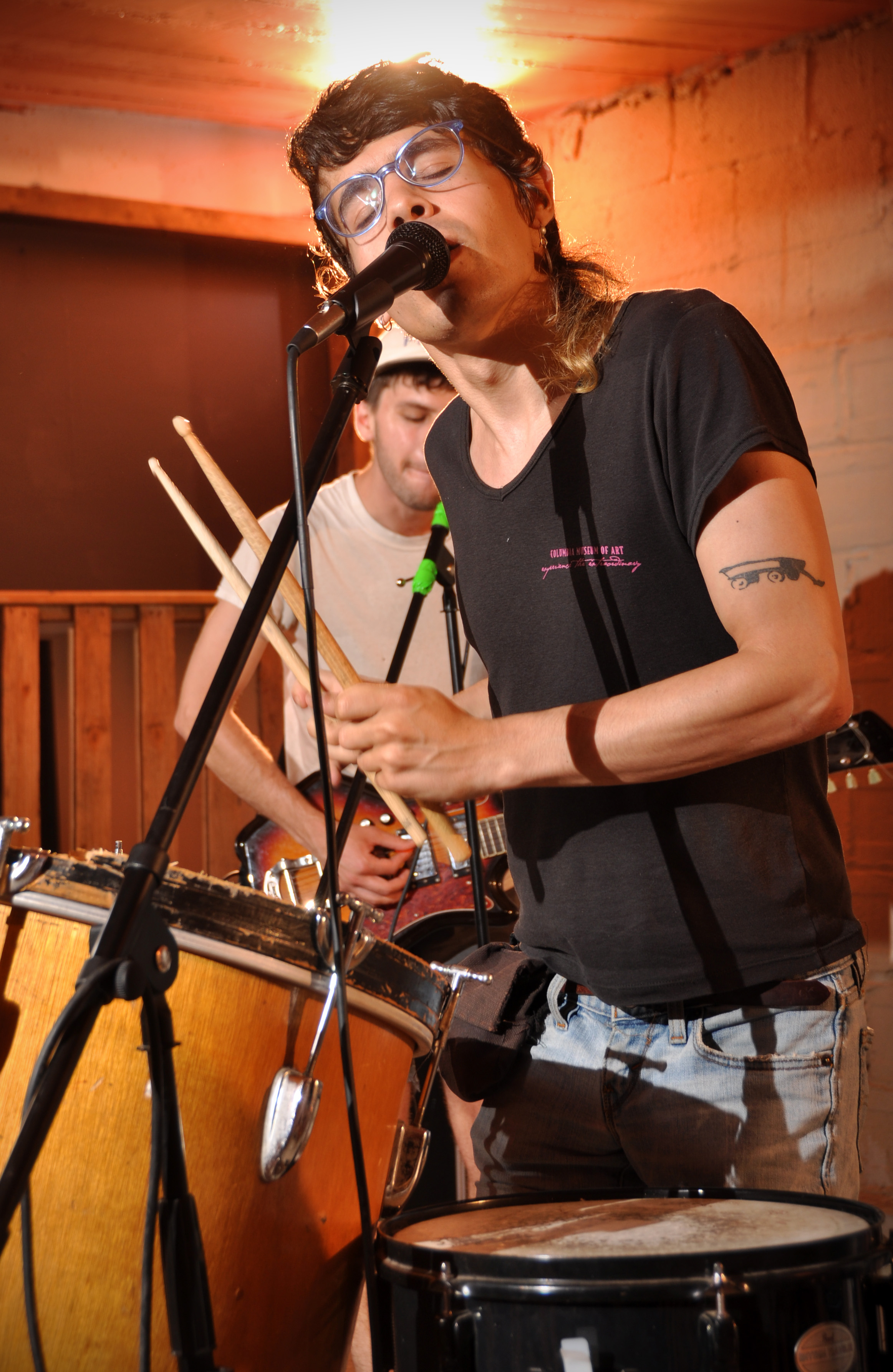
- Told Slant in 2014 (Charlotte, North Carolina)

Background information
- Origin: New York City, U.S.
- Genres: Emo; indie folk; sadcore; lo-fi
- Years active: 2012–present
- Labels: Broken World Media; Double Double Whammy
- Members: Felix Walworth; Oliver Kalb; Gabrielle Smith; Emily Sprague
- Past members: Maddy Strassler; Lulu Duffy-Tumasz; Charley Summers; Beck Hoffman
- Website: toldslant.bandcamp.com

Told Slant is a low-fi indie band from Brooklyn, New York. It is led by Felix Walworth, who is also involved in other projects, including Gabby's World, Florist, CIAO MALZ, Avery Friedman, and Bellows. David Anthony, writing for The A.V. Club, praised Walworth for their ability to produce "simple, heartbreaking songs".

== History ==
Told Slant was formed at Bard College where Walworth met Kalb and started playing music together. They released Still Water in 2012, and their sophomore album Going By in 2016. Walworth writes and records all of the parts to the songs, bringing in other members for live performances.

Told Slant was scheduled to play at the 2017 South by Southwest festival but canceled over fears that the festival would aid in deporting foreign artists.

On 15 September 2020, Walworth announced that their next album, titled Point the Flashlight and Walk, would be released on 13 November by Double Double Whammy.

== Members ==
=== Current members ===
- Felix Walworth
- Oliver Kalb
- Gabrielle Smith
- Emily Sprague

=== Past members ===
- Lulu Duffy-Tumasz
- Beck Hoffman
- Maddy Strassler
- Charley Summers

== Discography ==
=== Albums ===
- Still Water (2012), self-released
- Going By (2016), Double Double Whammy
- Point the Flashlight and Walk (2020), Double Double Whammy
- What's Up (2026) Mtn Laurel Recording Co.

=== Live recordings ===
- Live at ACRN Ohio University (2014), Broken World Media
