= Robert Kolodny =

Robert Kolodny may refer to:

- Robert C. Kolodny, American writer on human sexuality
- Robert Kolodny (filmmaker), American filmmaker

== See also ==
- Robert Garland Colodny (1915–1997), American professor, historian, and anti-fascist
