= Babehoven =

American indie rock duo

- Origin: Portland, Oregon, U.S.
- Genre: Indie rock
- Years active: 2018–present
- Label: Double Double Whammy
- Members: Maya Bon; Ryan Albert
- Past members: Skyler Apia; Elias Williamson
- Website: www.babehoven.com

Babehoven is an American indie rock duo currently based in Hudson, New York. The duo is led by vocalist Maya Bon, who previously resided in Portland, Oregon, and Los Angeles, California.

== History ==
Babehoven originally began as a trio, consisting of Maya Bon, Skyler Apia, and Elias Williamson. The group released their first EP in 2018 titled Sleep. In 2020, the group released their second EP titled Demonstrating Visible Differences of Height. They followed up that EP with a third EP titled Nastavi, Calliope. In 2022, the lineup changed to a duo of Bon and Ryan Albert. As a duo, they announced their debut full-length album, Light Moving Time, to be released on October 28 through Double Double Whammy. Along with the announcement, they announced a tour with Los Angeles based indie folk musician Skullcrusher. In 2024, their second studio album, "Water's Here in You," was released. Their third album “I See Them, They See Me” was released on September 18, 2026.
