= Free Cake for Every Creature =

American musician

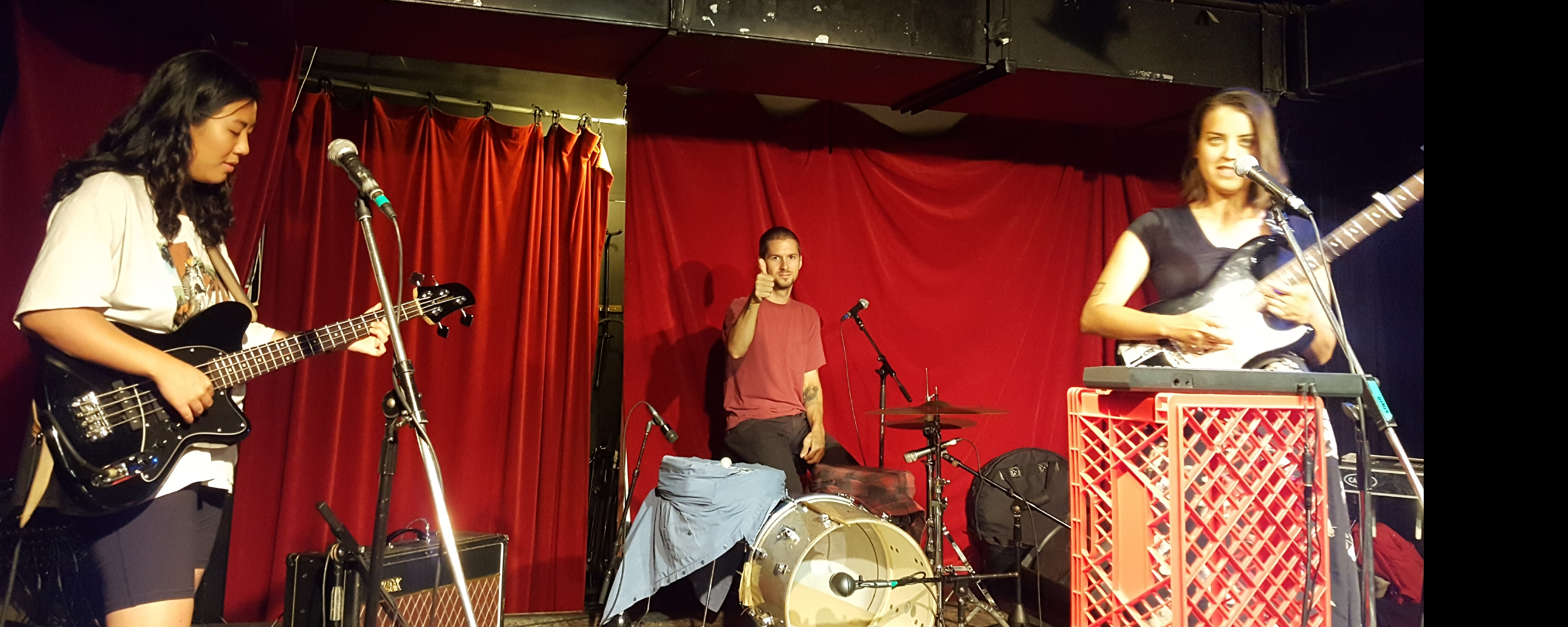

Background information
- Born: Katie Bennett
- Origin: Saratoga Springs, New York
- Genres: Indie pop, lo-fi
- Years active: 2013–2019
- Label: Double Double Whammy

Free Cake for Every Creature was the project of Philadelphia musician Katie Bennett.

== Career ==
Bennett began her career as Free Cake for Every Creature in Saratoga Springs, New York while attending Skidmore College. Bennett first recorded a full-length album in 2013 titled Shitty Beginnings. Bennett recorded another full-length album in 2013 titled young professional. In early 2014, Bennett signed with Double Double Whammy, releasing her first full-length album under the label, Pretty Good, in 2014. The album featured Bennett with a full band. In 2015, Bennett released a tape of nine songs titled Moving Songs on Double Double Whammy. In 2016, Bennett recorded her second full-length album under Double Double Whammy titled Talking Quietly of Anything With You. The album was ranked number 16 on Rob Sheffield's list titled "Rob Sheffield's Top 20 Albums of 2016". From the album, "First Summer in a City" was listed in Bob Boilen's list of Top 40 Songs of 2016. In 2017, two songs were posted to the Free Cake for Every Creature bandcamp page titled 2 Love Songs. In the Summer of 2018, Bennett released an album under Double Double Whammy, entitled the bluest star. On March 12, 2019, Bennett decided to end the project, believing that "it just feels right to end now, on a high note".
