= Jubilee (Japanese Breakfast album) =

Studio album by Japanese Breakfast
- Released: June 4, 2021
- Recorded: 2019
- Genres: Alternative pop; dream pop; indie pop
- Length: 36:59
- Label: Dead Oceans
- Producers: Michelle Zauner; Craig Hendrix; Jack Tatum; Ryan Galloway; Alex G

Japanese Breakfast chronology
Soft Sounds from Another Planet (2017)	Jubilee (2021)	Sable (Original Video Game Soundtrack) (2021)

Singles from Jubilee
- 1. "Be Sweet" Released: March 2, 2021; 2. "Posing in Bondage" Released: April 8, 2021; 3. "Savage Good Boy" Released: May 19, 2021; 4. "Paprika" Released: September 27, 2021

Jubilee is the third studio album by American indie pop band Japanese Breakfast, released on June 4, 2021, through Dead Oceans. Released shortly after the publication of her memoir Crying in H Mart that year, frontwoman Michelle Zauner said, "After spending the last five years writing about grief," she wanted Japanese Breakfast's third album "to be about joy".

Upon release, Jubilee received widespread acclaim from critics who praised its joyfulness and its production. It received a nomination for Best Alternative Music Album at the 64th Annual Grammy Awards and won 4 Libera Awards, including Record of the Year. Commercially, it is the group's most successful album, becoming their first to chart on the Billboard 200 where it peaked at number 56.

== Themes and composition ==
Jubilee has been labeled as an alternative pop, dream pop, and indie pop record, with elements of indie rock and chamber pop. Zauner has described the album as being about joy. This is in contrast to her previous two albums, Psychopomp (2016) and Soft Sounds from Another Planet (2017), both of which had prevalent themes of grief surrounding her mother's death from pancreatic cancer in 2014.

Zauner took music theory lessons and studied piano in preparation for Jubilee. She noted "I was just able to incorporate more interesting chord changes and write more on piano for the first time."

The first song written for the album was "Be Sweet", which Zauner wrote with Wild Nothing lead singer Jack Tatum years before Jubilee's release. "I’ve been holding onto it for so long and am so excited to finally put it out there," she said.

Jubilee was produced using the digital audio workstation (DAW) software Pro Tools. The production of the song "Paprika" resulted in the Pro Tools session maxing out due to the large number of tracks being used.

== Release and promotion ==
=== Singles ===
The first single, "Be Sweet", and its self-directed music video were released on March 2, 2021. In The X-Files-inspired video, Zauner and Marisa "Missy" Dabice act as FBI Agents tracking aliens while the former reprises her role as Shelley Breakfast which originated in the music video for American power pop band Charly Bliss' single, "Capacity". To promote the album, on March 15, Japanese Breakfast performed the songs "Be Sweet" and "Jimmy Fallon Big!" on The Tonight Show Starring Jimmy Fallon.

The second single, "Posing in Bondage", and its music video were released on April 8, 2021. The video, also directed by Zauner, depicts her entering a grocery store late at night while covered in blood. The store is empty except for a single employee, played by Harmony Tividad.

The third single, "Savage Good Boy", was released on May 19, 2021. Zauner said in a statement about the song, "'Savage Good Boy' came from a headline I read about billionaires buying bunkers. I was interested in examining that specific type of villainy, and I found myself adopting the perspective of a rich man coaxing a young woman to come live with him underground, attempting to rationalize his almost impossible share of greed and miserliness". The video, directed by Zauner, features actor Michael Imperioli and is a prequel to the previous video for "Posing in Bondage". In it, Imperioli plays the billionaire in a bunker, with Zauner as the young woman he has convinced to live underground with him.

=== Live performances ===
Japanese Breakfast performed three songs from the album on CBS This Morning, the day after the album's release. A version of "Be Sweet" with vocals in the fictional Simlish language is included in the eleventh expansion pack for The Sims 4, Cottage Living, released on July 22, 2021.

On May 21, 2022, Japanese Breakfast performed "Be Sweet" and "Paprika" as the musical guest for the season-finale episode of Saturday Night Live. Zauner also made a cameo in the skit "Women's Commercial."

=== Tour ===
Japanese Breakfast toured to support Jubilee in 2021, 2022 and 2023, playing more than 140 concerts on four continents.

== Critical reception and accolades ==
Professional ratings
Aggregate scores
Source	Rating
AnyDecentMusic?	8.5/10
Metacritic	88/100
Review scores
Source	Rating
AllMusic	4.5/5 stars
Clash	9/10
DIY	5/5 stars
Exclaim!	9/10
The Independent	5/5 stars
NME	4/5 stars
Pitchfork	7.8/10
Rolling Stone	4/5 stars
The Skinny	4/5 stars
Slant Magazine	4/5 stars
Uncut	7/10

Jubilee was met with widespread critical acclaim. Critics lauded the album's joyous tone, Zauner's storytelling abilities, the songs' hooks and the album's production. At Metacritic, which assigns a normalized rating out of 100 to reviews from professional publications, the album received an average score of 88, based on 19 reviews.

Zack Ruskin of Variety noted that the album deals with a "different type of catharsis" and that it "takes all the things that have always served Japanese Breakfast well – Zauner's awareness of her voice and how best to deploy it, her knack for narrative and story as well as great hooks – and offers them fresh soil in which to grow". Alisha Mughal of Exclaim! also noted the album's approach to catharsis, stating that the album offers "a validation of whatever it is you feel" and that Zauner's voice makes listeners "feel alive". Jillian Mapes of Pitchfork considered the album to be "an interesting example of pop's fluidity" and deemed Zauner's energy on the album to be "infectious". The Quietus' Ed Power also lauded the album's joyous tone while both writers noted the album's darker songs such as "In Hell" that deal with grief.

Zauner's perceived maturation in the album was also acclaimed. Clash magazine's Sam Walker-Smart found Zauner to be "fully unshackled for the first time, keeping the emotive core of her songwriting and marrying it with boundless energy and ambition". Sean Kerwick of DIY also observed maturation in the singer, describing her as "older and wiser with melody, lyrics and storytelling pulling focus" with results that establish her as a dominant "creative force".

However, the album's second half was criticized as being uneven by few. In a mostly positive review, Ethan Gordon of No Ripcord opined that during the album's second half, "things don't click as strongly" though he stated that the song "Savage Good Boy" salvages "the end of the album". Tom Hull regarded the album's first half as "glorious pop", but concluding that the rest "tails off a bit".

=== Year-end lists ===
Jubilee was ranked by publications such as Consequence Of Sound, The Guardian, NPR, Paste, Pitchfork, Rolling Stone, Slant as one of the best albums of 2021. Additionally, the album placed fifth on Metacritic's 2021 end of year lists.

Critics' rankings for Jubilee
Publication	Accolade	Rank	Ref.
Consequence of Sound	Top 50 albums of 2021	2	
The Guardian	The 50 best albums of 2021	13	
NPR	The 50 Best Albums of 2021	11	
Paste	The 50 Best Albums of 2021	5	
Pitchfork	The 50 Best Albums of 2021	14	
Rolling Stone	50 Best Albums of 2021	10	
Slant	The 50 Best Albums of 2021	1	
Stereogum	The 50 Best Albums Of 2021 So Far	18	
Uproxx	The Best Albums Of 2021	—N/a	

=== Awards ===
Jubilee was nominated for the Grammy Award for Best Alternative Music Album at the 64th Annual Grammy Awards although it lost to American musician St. Vincent's album Daddy's Home. It was additionally nominated for Outstanding Breakthrough Music Artist at the GLAAD Media Awards while it won four awards at the Libera Awards. Additionally, the music video for "Savage Good Boy" was nominated for the Libera Award for Video of the Year.

Awards and nominations for Jubilee
Year	Ceremony	Category	Result	Ref.
2022	Grammy Awards	Best Alternative Music Album	Nominated	
2022	GLAAD Media Award	Outstanding Breakthrough Music Artist	Nominated	
2022	Libera Awards	Record of the Year	Won	
2022	Libera Awards	Best Alternative Rock Record	Won	
2022	Libera Awards	Breakthrough Artist/Release	Nominated	
2022	Libera Awards	Creative Packaging	Won	
2022	Libera Awards	Marketing Genius	Won	

== Track listing ==
All lyrics are written by Michelle Zauner; all music is composed by Zauner, except for "Be Sweet", composed by Zauner and Jack Tatum. Credits adapted from Spotify.

Jubilee
No.	Title	Producer(s)	Length
1.	"Paprika"	Michelle Zauner; Craig Hendrix	3:40
2.	"Be Sweet"	Zauner; Hendrix; Jack Tatum	3:15
3.	"Kokomo, IN"	Zauner; Hendrix	3:38
4.	"Slide Tackle"	Zauner; Hendrix; Ryan Galloway	3:39
5.	"Posing in Bondage"	Zauner; Tatum	4:05
6.	"Sit"	Zauner; Hendrix	3:07
7.	"Savage Good Boy"	Zauner; Hendrix; Alex Giannoscolli	2:26
8.	"In Hell"	Zauner; Hendrix	2:38
9.	"Tactics"	Zauner; Hendrix	3:53
10.	"Posing for Cars"	Zauner; Hendrix	6:38
Total length:			36:59

== Personnel ==
Credits are adapted from the album's liner notes.

Musicians

- Michelle Zauner – vocals, production, bass (4), piano (7), acoustic guitar (3), electric guitar (6, 7, 8, 10), percussion (1), synthesizers (1, 3, 4, 6, 8, 10) string arrangements (1, 3, 9), horn arrangements (1)
- Craig Hendrix – production (1–4, 6–10), drums (1–4, 7–10), bass (1, 3, 6–10), electric guitar (4, 8), acoustic guitar (10), slide guitar (3), Rhodes (9), piano (10), synthesizers (1, 3, 4, 6, 8, 10), percussion, string arrangements (1, 3, 9), horn arrangements (1, 4, 8), vocals (8), engineering
- Jack Tatum – production, synthesizers, programming, electric guitar, E-bow electric guitar, bass, vocals, engineering (2, 5)
- Ryan Galloway – production, electric guitar, synthesizers (4)
- Alex Giannascoli – production, Rhodes, piano, synthesizers (7)
- Molly Germer – violin (1, 3, 9)
- Veronica Jurkiewicz – viola (1, 3, 9)
- Carolina Diazgranados – cello (1, 3, 9)
- Adam Schatz – saxophone (1, 4, 8)
- Aaron Rockers – trumpet (1, 4, 8)
- Adam Dotson – trombone (1, 4, 8)

Additional engineers

- Alex Santilli – additional engineering (1, 3, 9)
- Eric Bogacz – additional engineering (1, 3, 9)

Artwork

- Michelle Zauner – creative direction
- Peter Ash Lee – photography
- Evaline Huang – production design
- Peter Bradley – production assistant
- Cecelia Liu – styling
- Maiko Waki – hair and makeup
- Nathaniel David Utesch – layout, design

== Charts ==
Chart performance for Jubilee
Chart (2021)	Peak position
German Albums (Offizielle Top 100)	77
Scottish Albums (Official Charts)	11
UK Albums (Official Charts)	53
UK Independent Albums (Official Charts)	3
US Billboard 200	56
US Top Alternative Albums (Billboard)	7
US Independent Albums (Billboard)	7
US Top Rock Albums (Billboard)	8
