= Hovvdy (album) =

Studio album by Hovvdy
- Released: April 26, 2024
- Genre: Pop
- Length: 53:43
- Label: Arts & Crafts Productions
- Producer: Hovvdy; Andrew Sarlo; Bennett Littlejohn

Hovvdy chronology
True Love (2021)	Hovvdy (2024)	Big World (2026)

Hovvdy is the fifth studio album by American duo Hovvdy, released on April 26, 2024, through Arts & Crafts Productions. It received acclaim from critics.

== Critical reception ==
Professional ratings
Aggregate scores
Source	Rating
Metacritic	81/100
Review scores
Source	Rating
AllMusic	4/5 stars
Exclaim!	8/10
The Line of Best Fit	8/10
Paste	8.3/10
Pitchfork	8.3/10
Record Collector	2/5 stars
Spin	A−
Under the Radar	7/10 stars

Hovvdy received a score of 81 out of 100 on review aggregator Metacritic based on eight critics' reviews, which the website categorised as "universal acclaim". Caleb Campbell of The Line of Best Fit wrote that the album "feels like a very intentional turning of the page" from their previous album, True Love (2021), as it is "dotted with skittering drum machines, keening pedal steel, and simmering synths" and "trying to draw out moments of catharsis or festival-ready melody". Paste's Ellen Johnson felt that the duo "turn to some heavier fare" on the album, which "pack[s] as much of a punch as anything they've ever released, all while never sacrificing the earmarks of the experimental Hovvdy sound".

Reviewing the album for Spin, Margaret Farrell wrote that Hovvdy "houses their most eclectic transitions and banger-certified pop songs", calling it "a microscopic photo album of their inner values at work". Daniel Gard'ner of Under the Radar called the album "an expansion of the band's aesthetic, a broadening of scope that matches the evolving complexity of their lives" as "their hushed, intimate storytelling is given the required space to slowly unwind and cast a quiet spell". In a "Highly Recommended" review for Chorus.fm, Aaron Mook called the album a "largely subdued collection with quiet, introspective moments," concluding that "Hovvdy are talented and ambitious enough to throw everything but the kitchen sink into their songwriting process and still arrive with a statement piece that feels like their least immediate in years, but their most rewarding album to date."

== Track listing ==
Hovvdy track listing
No.	Title	Writer(s)	Length
1.	"Intro"	Charlie Martin	0:25
2.	"Bubba"	Martin	3:09
3.	"Jean"	Will Taylor	3:01
4.	"Big Blue"	Martin	3:20
5.	"Shell"	Taylor	2:42
6.	"Forever Piano"	Martin	0:21
7.	"Forever"	Martin	3:28
8.	"Heartstring"	Taylor	3:11
9.	"Clean"	Martin	1:49
10.	"Make Ya Proud"	Martin	3:30
11.	"Til I Let You Know"	Taylor	2:04
12.	"Meant"	Taylor	3:27
13.	"Song for Pete"	Martin	3:13
14.	"Every Exchange"	Taylor	3:57
15.	"Give It Up"	Martin	3:51
16.	"Portrait"	Taylor	3:02
17.	"Angel"	Martin	2:46
18.	"Bad News"	Martin; Taylor	2:54
19.	"A Little"	Taylor	3:33
Total length:			53:43

== Personnel ==
Hovvdy

- Charlie Martin – performance, production
- Will Taylor – performance, production

Additional contributors

- Bennett Littlejohn – performance, production, mixing
- Andrew Sarlo – performance, production
- Simon Lancelot – mastering
- Andy Gross – additional engineering
- Adam Alonzo – art direction, photography
- Bradley Pinkerton – design, layout
- Taylor Clark – photography
