= Crying (band) =

American rock band

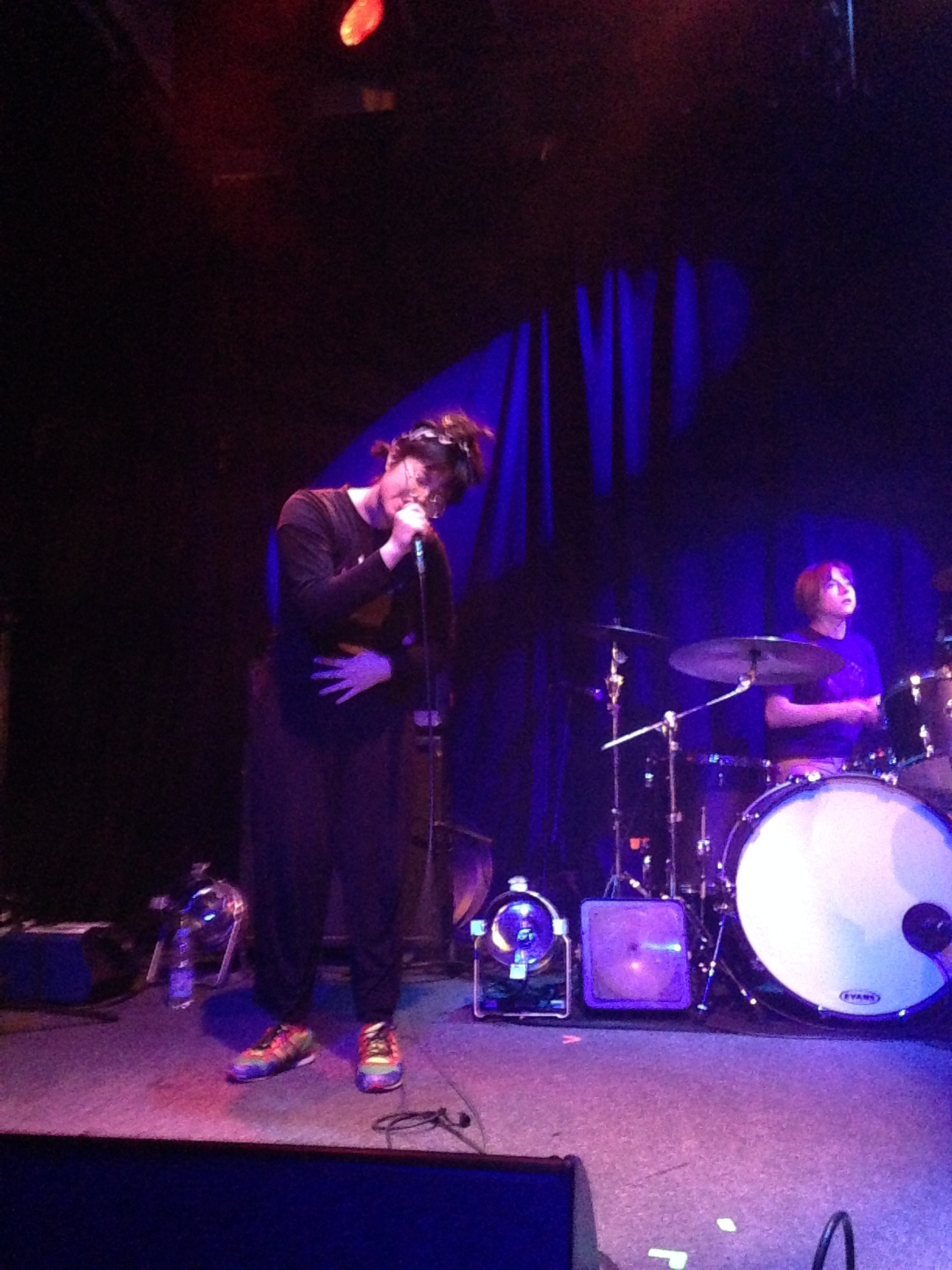
- Crying performing in Cologne in January 2017

Background information
- Origin: Purchase, New York, U.S.
- Genres: Indie pop; synth-pop; bitpop; chiptune; electropop; indie rock
- Years active: 2013–Present
- Labels: Double Double Whammy; Run For Cover; Thistime (Japan)
- Members: Elaiza Santos; Ryan Galloway; Kynwyn Sterling
- Past members: Nick Corbo
- Website: wearecrying.bandcamp.com wearecrying.tumblr.com

Crying is an American rock band from Purchase, New York formed in 2013. They consist of Elaiza Santos (vocals), Ryan Galloway (guitars, keyboards) and Kynwyn Sterling (drums). Crying have released two EPs and released their debut album Beyond the Fleeting Gales in October 2016.

== History ==
Crying was formed in May 2013 at State University of New York at Purchase. The band was formed by Elaiza Santos (Vocals), Ryan Galloway (Guitars/Programming), and Nick Corbo (Drums). In 2013, the group released their debut EP Get Olde via Double Double Whammy. The band later released a remix EP of Get Olde with additional new tracks and b-sides titled Return to Olde World: Demos and B-Sides.

In 2014 Crying released their second EP, Second Wind via Bandcamp. The band then signed to Run for Cover Records and reissued their first two EPs in a compilation, Get Olde/Second Wind. In 2015, Corbo left Crying to focus on his other band, LVL UP. In March, the band released a standalone single, "Patriot", via the band's Bandcamp, in which a remixed version would later be featured on the band's debut LP.

In August 2016, the band announced their debut LP, Beyond the Fleeting Gales, would be released by Run For Cover on October 14, 2016. On August 24, 2016, the band released the track, "Wool in the Wash", from the upcoming LP.

In March 2017, the band performed a live session on Audiotree and it was released via streaming services.

In 2020, Ryan Galloway formed a band with Michelle Zauner called Bumper. The band released their debut EP pop songs 2020 on 4 September 2020.

== Band members ==
=== Current members ===
- Elaiza "Z" Santos – vocals (2013–2017)
- Ryan Galloway – guitar, synthesizer, Game Boy (2013–2017)
- Kynwyn Sterling – drums (2017)

=== Former members ===
- Nick Corbo – drums (2013–?)

== Discography ==
=== Studio albums ===
Title	Album details
Beyond the Fleeting Gales	Released: October 14, 2016; Label: Run for Cover; Format: Digital download, CD, cassette, vinyl

=== Extended plays ===
Year	Title	Label
2013	Get Olde	Self-released
2014	Return to Olde World: Demos and B-Side	Self-released
2014	Second Wind	Self-released

=== Singles ===
Year	Title	Album/EP
2015	"Patriot"	Beyond the Fleeting Gales
2016	"Wool in the Wash"	Beyond the Fleeting Gales

=== Compilation albums ===
Title	Album details
Get Olde/Second Wind	Released: November 17, 2014; Label: Run for Cover; Format: Digital download, vinyl

=== Live albums ===
Title	Album details
Crying on Audiotree Live	Released: March 15, 2017; Label: Self-released, Audiotree; Format: Digital download, streaming
