= Gabby's World =

American singer-songwriter

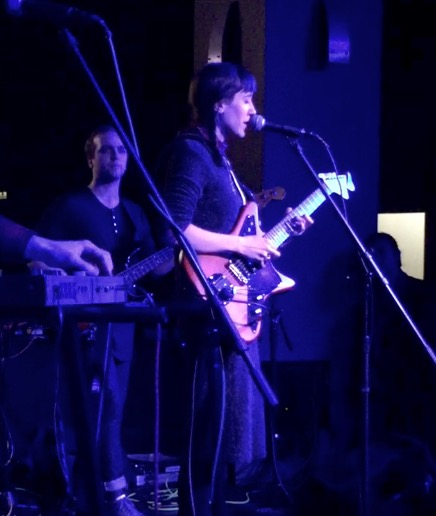
- Gabby's World performing at NU Afterhours on February 11, 2016.

Background information
- Born: Gabrielle Smith
- Origin: Brooklyn, New York
- Genres: Indie pop, Indie rock, Folk, Bedroom pop
- Occupations: Singer-Songwriter, Musician
- Years active: 2007–present
- Labels: Double Double Whammy, Yellow K Records
- Spouse: Barrie Lindsay (m. 2021)

Gabby's World (formerly Ó and Eskimeaux) is the recording project of Gabrielle Smith, an American singer-songwriter and producer from Brooklyn. Smith began making and releasing experimental ambient music in 2007. Since then, the solo project has turned into a four-piece indie pop band made up of Bellows's Oliver Kalb, Told Slant’s Felix Walworth, Sharpless's Jack Greenleaf and Smith. Felix Walworth has since been replaced by Ian Cory of Lamniformes.

== Early life ==
Gabrielle Smith grew up in New York City. Born in Corvallis, Oregon, Smith was adopted at a young age and to this day knows little about her family history except that her birth father is of Tlingit descent. Smith spent her youth singing in choir and playing violin, but did not start writing and performing her own songs until after dropping out of Bard High School Early College. Growing up in Manhattan, Smith also spent many of her late-teen years going to DIY shows in Brooklyn. Inspired to be a part of the DIY scene, Smith started writing songs under the moniker Eskimeaux, but in 2017 changed her band name to Ó following criticism from Inuk singer Tanya Tagaq before finally using Gabby's World.

== Career ==
In 2008, Smith enrolled in the University of the Arts (Philadelphia) but dropped out in early 2009. During these two years, Smith met many of their current collaborators and friends, forming an artist collective based in Brooklyn that Smith later co-founded. These artists opened up Smith's eyes to new music stylings and influenced much of her work. Her early recordings from around this time were more electronic, experimental and synth heavy than her more recent releases.

In 2011, Smith released Two Mountains and formed an artist collective with friends as a way to support each other and release art under one umbrella. A year later, Smith released a self-titled album, which was almost entirely made up of re-recorded songs from an extensive collection of demos. It was with eventual collaboration from friends' bands, such as Told Slant, Bellows, and Frankie Cosmos, that inspired Smith to overcome a long writing block. She began to write and record new material through a song-a-day project with Frankie Cosmos, Japanese Breakfast, Florist, and Small Wonder. Many of the songs written during this time appear on O.K.

By 2014, the live line up was cemented, and the band's sound began to resemble the indie pop sensibility it has now. While trying to put together O.K., the band worked on old songs already written by Smith, adding dimensions and layers that would make the songs more suitable to play live. O.K. was released on May 12, 2015 on Double Double Whammy Records and received favorable reviews from Pitchfork, NPR, and Stereogum.

In 2018, Smith released her first album under the moniker Gabby's World, Beast On Beast, on Yellow K Records. Its singles received positive reviews from NPR, The Fader and Stereogum.

In 2020, Smith contributed to the benefit compilation The Song is Coming From Inside the House, organized by indie band Strange Ranger to raise funds for Groundswell's Rapid Response Fund.

In 2021, Smith began collaborating with Barrie and executive produced the album Barbara. Gabby later began touring with Barrie internationally to promote the album. In the same year Smith toured with and recorded several live performances with Japanese Breakfast, contributing synths and backing vocals.

In late 2023, Smith released the lp Gabby Sword on Carrot All Records, marking the first full length release in five years. The album contends with themes of friendship, aging, autobiography and newfound queer identity. In the interim years Gabby began her first same sex relationship with collaborator Barrie and the two married in 2021. In October of 2024, Smith embarked on a US tour to support Gabby Sword.

== Discography ==
- iglu songs (2008)
- Doubt EP (2010)
- I Am a Spiral (2010)
- Ixsixán (2010)
- Grain of Sand (2010)
- Two Mountains (2011 and reissued in 2015)
- Eskimeaux (2012)
- Arms Apart (2013)
- Walk Away From Me (2013)
- Ingluenza (2013)
- O.K. (2015)
- Year of the Rabbit EP (2016)
- Beast on Beast (2018)
- GABBY SWORD (2023)

== Current members ==
- Gabrielle Smith – guitar, vocals
- Oliver Kalb – keys
- Ian Cory – drums
- Jack Greenleaf – bass

== Past members ==
- Felix Walworth
