= 2nd Grade (band) =

American indie rock band

- Origin: Philadelphia, Pennsylvania, U.S.
- Genres: Indie rock, power pop
- Years active: 2018-present
- Label: Double Double Whammy

2nd Grade is an American indie rock band from Philadelphia, Pennsylvania. Formed in 2018 as a musical project for Peter Gill (lead vocals, guitar), the group now includes Catherine Dwyer (vocals), David Settle (bass), and Francis Lyons (drums). The group has released three full-length albums. Their music has drawn comparisons to Guided by Voices, a prominent indie rock band.

== History ==
2nd Grade began as the project of musician Peter Gill. In 2018, Gill released a demo titled Wish You Were Here Tour. After the demo, the project expanded, and added Jon Samuels of Friendship and Catherine Dwyer and Jack Washburn of Remember Sports. With this expansion, the group released their first album together, Hit to Hit, in 2021 through Double Double Whammy. The album was named Stereogum's "Album Of The Week". The group announced their second album in mid-2022. The album, titled Easy Listening, was released on September 30, 2022.

On October 25, 2024, the group released their third full-length album, Scheduled Explosions. The album was home-recorded with engineer Lucas Knapp, who also recorded Hit to Hit.

== Members ==
- Peter Gill - Vocals, Guitar
- Catherine Dwyer - Vocals
- David Settle - Bass
- Francis Lyons - Drums

== Discography ==
=== Albums ===
- Hit to Hit (2021)
- Easy Listening (2022)
- Scheduled Explosions (2024)
