= The Featherweight =

2024 American film by Robert Kolodny

- Theatrical release poster
- Directed by: Robert Kolodny
- Screenplay by: Steve Loff
- Produced by: Bennett Elliott; Robert Greene; Asger Hussain; Steve Loff; James Madio; Abhayanand Singh
- Starring: James Madio; Ruby Wolf; Keir Gilchrist; Lawrence Gilliard Jr.; Shari Albert; Imma Aiello; Stephen Lang; Ron Livingston
- Cinematography: Adam Kolodny
- Edited by: Robert Greene
- Music by: Retail Space
- Production company: Appian Way Productions
- Distributed by: Tribeca Films
- Release dates: September 3, 2023 (Venice); September 20, 2024 (United States)
- Running time: 99 minutes
- Country: United States
- Language: English
- Box office: $22,011

The Featherweight is a 2024 American biographical sports drama film directed by Robert Kolodny, written by Steve Loff, and starring James Madio as professional boxer Willie Pep. It premiered at the 80th Venice International Film Festival.

== Plot ==
Set in 1964, a direct cinema camera crew follows Willie Pep, retired two-time world featherweight boxing champion. Now living in Hartford, Connecticut with his wife Linda, an aspiring actress half his age, a drug-addled son, his Italian immigrant parents, mounting debts and the feeling of faded glory ... Pep decides to make a return to the ring.

== Cast ==
- James Madio as Willie Pep
- Ruby Wolf as Linda Pep
- Keir Gilchrist as Billy Papaleo Jr.
- Stephen Lang as Bill Gore
- Ron Livingston as Bob Kaplan
- Lawrence Gilliard Jr. as Sandy Saddler
- Shari Albert as Fran
- Imma Aiello as "Mama" Papaleo

== Production ==
Filming occurred in Hartford, Connecticut in late 2021, utilizing real locations from Willie Pep's life. Kolodny cast both professional actors and locals to heighten the nonfiction aesthetic of the film. Aside from Robert Kolodny, who spent the years as a documentary cinematographer on films like Procession and All the Beauty and the Bloodshed, the team behind the film involved several celebrated filmmakers from the documentary community, including Steve James as executive producer and Robert Greene as editor.

== Release ==
The film received a five-minute standing ovation at its premiere at the Venice International Film Festival.

It went on to be selected as the closing film of the 54th International Film Festival of India and the showcase screening of the Museum of the Moving Image's First Look Festival. Robert Kolodny was awarded the prize for best director at both the Provincetown International Film Festival and the RiverRun International Film Festival.

The Featherweight was released in the United States by mTuckman Media on September 20, 2024. It was the highest-grossing film at the Quad Cinema during its opening weekend, where it sold out three evening shows on consecutive nights, causing it to be held over for an additional week.

After its theatrical run, Tribeca Films acquired The Featherweight for streaming, worldwide.

== Reception ==
The New Yorker named The Featherweight one of the best films of 2024. It received praise by Indiewire, who compared the cinéma vérité to John Cassavetes and Dana Thomas calling it a "mash-up Mean Streets and Raging Bull " in The Style Files.

On the review aggregator website Rotten Tomatoes, 83% of 12 critics' reviews are positive, with an average rating of 7.5/10. Metacritic, which uses a weighted average, assigned the film a score of 79 out of 100, based on five critics, indicating "generally favorable" reviews.

The New Yorker's Richard Brody said of The Featherweight "Kolodny’s film is a touching, disquieting, relentlessly fascinating view of a troubled soul and of the world of trouble he belongs to. It’s an instant classic of a boxing movie, with its closeup view of the inseparable agonies and passions of a sport that’s shadowed with death. It’s an absorbing journalistic glance behind the scenes at a once-famed historical figure. But, above all, it’s a work of critical cinematic history, of self-criticism regarding the practice of nonfiction film—and, as such, it’s a vital reflection on the present day."

== See also ==
- List of boxing films
