= Heavy Lifter =

Studio album by Hovvdy
- Released: October 18, 2019
- Genre: Indie pop
- Length: 42:37
- Label: Double Double Whammy
- Producers: Ben Littlejohn; Charlie Martin

Hovvdy chronology
Cranberry (2018)	Heavy Lifter (2019)	True Love (2021)

Heavy Lifter is the third studio album by American alternative rock duo Hovvdy. It was released on October 18, 2019 under Double Double Whammy.

== Singles ==
On August 7, 2019, Hovvdy announced the release of the new album, along with the first single "Cathedral". The second single "Ruin (my ride)" was released with a music video on September 5, 2019. On September 25, 2019, the third single, "So Brite" was released. "Mr Lee", the fourth single, was released on October 9, 2019.

== Critical reception ==
Professional ratings
Aggregate scores
Source	Rating
Metacritic	83/100
Review scores
Source	Rating
AllMusic	3.5/5 stars
The Austin Chronicle	4.5/5 stars
Exclaim!	8/10
The Line of Best Fit	9/10
No Ripcord	7/10
Paste	6.4/10
Pitchfork	7.4/10

Heavy Lifter was met with "universal acclaim" reviews from critics. At Metacritic, which assigns a weighted average rating out of 100 to reviews from mainstream publications, this release received an average score of 83, based on 7 reviews.

== Track listing ==
Heavy Lifter track listing
No.	Title	Length
1.	"1999"	2:58
2.	"Mr. Lee"	3:19
3.	"So Brite"	3:16
4.	"Cathedral"	3:04
5.	"Lifted"	3:13
6.	"feel tall"	3:02
7.	"Tellmel'masinger"	2:25
8.	"Ruin (my ride)"	3:30
9.	"Tools"	2:15
10.	"Watergun"	4:46
11.	"Pixie"	3:14
12.	"Keep It Up"	3:26
13.	"Sudbury"	3:09

== Personnel ==
Musicians

- Charlie Martin – vocals, producer
- Will Taylor – vocals

Production

- Santiago Dietsche – photographer
- Edsel Holden – mastering
- Ben Littlejohn – mixer, producer
