= Covey (folk rock project) =

Covey folk rock project

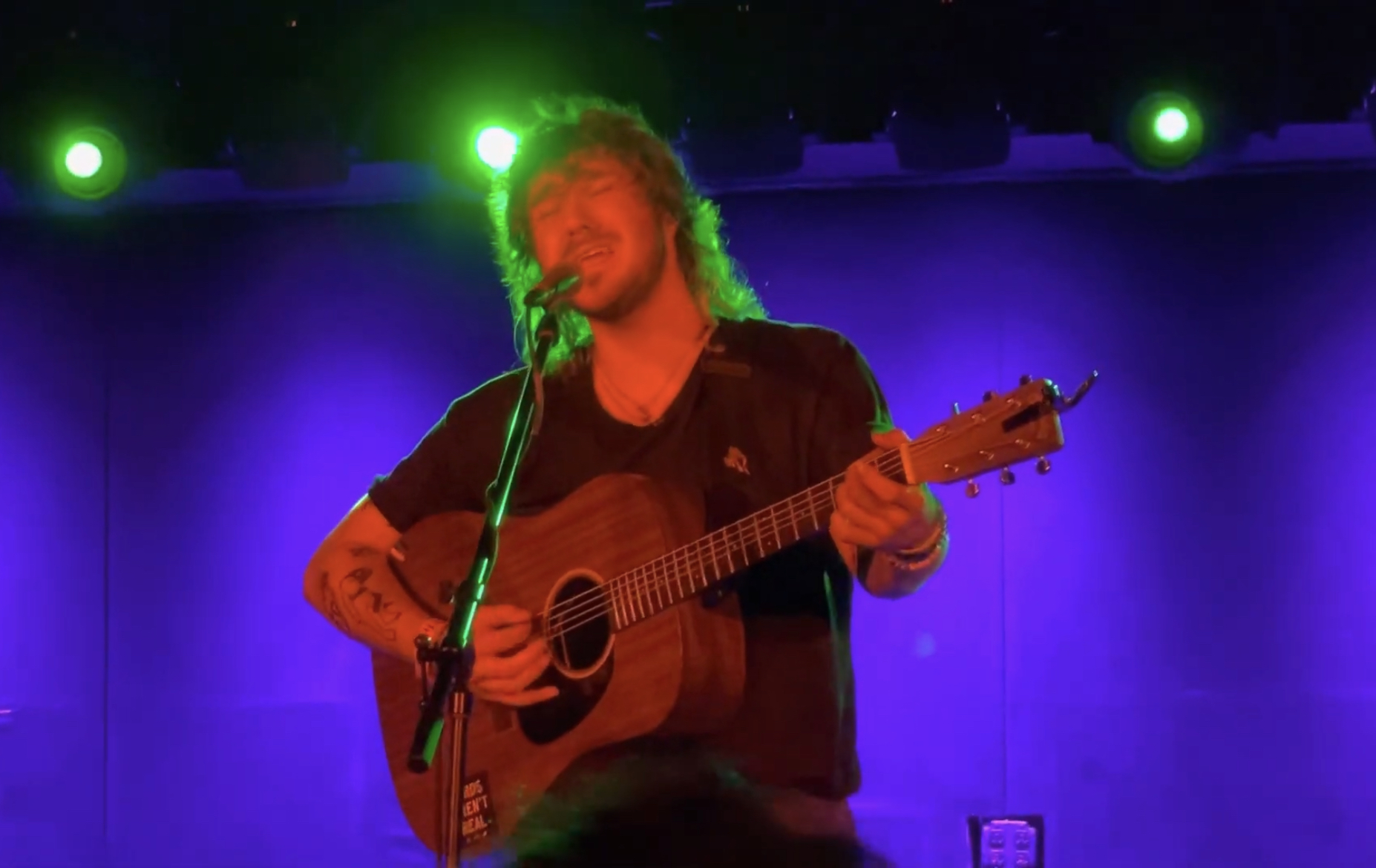
- Tom Freeman of Covey performing in New York City (Aug. 12, 2022)

Background information
- Origin: Boston, Brooklyn
- Genres: Folk rock; Indie rock; Folk punk; Pop punk; Emo
- Years active: 2013–present
- Labels: AntiFragile Music (2019); Rise Records (2020-present)
- Members: Tom Freeman; Dillon Rovere; Saguiv Rosenstock; Dan Hemerlein
- Past members: Joradan Rich; Mike Kerr; Michi Tassey; Guillermo Goldschmied; Adam Marks
- Website: store.coveysux.com

Covey is a folk rock music project created by Tom Freeman, a Brooklyn-based British artist, who has been called "the face" behind Covey. Originally formed in Boston, Covey included Freeman, Dillon Rovere, and others. Covey moved and reformed in Brooklyn, including Freeman and Rovere, as well as Saguiv Rosenstock and Dan Hemerlein.

== History ==
=== Early years in Boston and First Album: 2013–2017 ===
Freeman originally formed Covey while in Boston. The band formed at Berklee College of Music in February 2013, including Freeman, drummer Rovere, keyboardist Joradan Rich, lead guitarist Mike Kerr, and Michi Tassey providing female vocals. Freeman borrowed the name "Covey" from the street where he grew up in England. Covey released their first single in 2014 with the indie folk song titled "Comes and Goes." Covey released their debut album, Haggarty, on September 22, 2017. Haggarty includes performances by Guillermo Goldschmied on bass, Adam Marks on keys, and Dillon Rovere on drums. Covey performed as the opening act for national touring artists such as Hozier and others.

=== Move to Brooklyn and Second Album: 2019 ===
After Freeman relocated from Boston to Brooklyn, Covey's second album, Some Cats Live, Some Cats Die, was written in an "old house on Long Island," and released in May 2019. Front View Magazine described the album as "[s]oul-baring and bursting with a breadth of authentic emotion."

=== Tour to Nobody: 2020 ===
In 2020, Tom Freeman performed and recorded his so-called “Tour to Nobody” experience, in which he performed on the road in the Northeastern United States amid the COVID-19 pandemic, documented on his TikTok page, which has amassed over 4 million views. During the Tour to Nobody, Freeman performed songs at a wide variety of venues, including an abandoned asylum in New York, as well as a dinosaur park, roadside stores, and the Bread and Puppet Theater, and shared videos of these performances on TikTok and YouTube.

=== Class of Cardinal Sin: 2021-Present ===
Covey released their third studio album, Class of Cardinal Sin, on June 18, 2021. According to an interview with Sam Taylor of the music magazine Dork, Freeman recorded the songs himself and worked with a mixing engineer named Jake Cheriff to complete the album. The songs were composed, arranged, and recorded by Freeman. Drums were performed by Dillon Rovere. Horns were performed by Neal Rosenthal. The album was mixed by Jake Cheriff. The album was mastered by Joe Lambert. Edie McQueen, writing for Dork, noted that "the album deals with the residues of childhood trauma and bleak schoolboy days," and the site rated the album 3 out of 5. According to Mike LeSuer, writing for Flood Magazine, Covey's third album contains "brutally open lyrics," and the songs might have seemed "corny" if they had not been so "entirely genuine." Covey released two singles for the album, ‘Sam Jam’ and ‘Crooked Spine’. ‘Sam Jam’ is about imagining revenge on a man who assaulted his sister by pouring hot coffee on her head; ‘Crooked Spine’ is about his sister’s struggles with scoliosis. Covey created videos for TikTok to introduce the various characters seen on the cover of the album.

As of March 15, 2022, Freeman stated in an interview with Backward Noise, that he had been writing new songs and planned to record about 10 new tracks for a "follow up" album to Class of Cardinal Sin, which will continue the story from that album. However, according to Covey's Instagram account, on May 24, 2023, Freeman departed the U.S. to deal with mental health concerns. In June 2023, Freeman encountered difficulties returning to the U.S. relating to visa issues, and he remained in Canada for part of that time. On August 18, 2023, Freeman announced on social media, with an Instagram story, that he would be returning to the United States after about 3 months out of the country.

As of July 17, 2023, Covey has over 130,000 monthly listeners on Spotify. As of June 28, 2023, Covey has amassed 1.4 million followers and over 24 million likes on TikTok.

== Musical style and influences ==
Covey's musical influences include Neutral Milk Hotel, The Smiths, and Nick Drake, as well as Blink 182. Covey debuted with an indie folk single, 'Comes and Goes.' According to Front View Magazine, Covey's third album includes songs from several genres, including indie rock, folk-punk, pop-punk, and emo. According to Danielle Chelosky, writing for Stereogum, Covey's music mixes folk and indie rock, and Freeman's voice is pleasant, clean, and too "polished" to be considered folk-punk."

== Music videos ==
Covey has been praised for music videos that are "as creative as they are heartbreaking." For Covey's first studio album, Haggarty, they released an official music video for the track 'Same White Shoes' on April 12, 2018. For Covey's second album, Some Cats Live, Some Cats Die, Covey released music videos for 'Gecko' on April 5, 2019 and 'Dog & Bone' on November 10, 2019. For Covey's third studio album, Class of Cardinal Sin, Covey released music videos for 'Cut the Crease' on December 10, 2020, 'Sam Jam' on March 4, 2021, '1991' on April 15, 2021, and 'Point Mutation' on June 15, 2021. According to Randall Colburn, writing for AV Club, the music video for 'Cut on the Crease' is a "twisted clip with an offbeat emotional edge" for the song, which has "piercing lyrics and stirring melodies." Several of Covey's music videos, including 'Sam Jam,' '1991,' and 'Point Mutation,' were directed by Emmy Award winning director Robert Kolodny.

== Band members ==
Current members

- Tom Freeman – vocals, guitar
- Saguiv Rosenstock – guitar
- Dillon Rovere – drums
- Dan Hemerlein – bass

Former members

- Joradan Rich – keys
- Mike Kerr – lead guitar
- Michi Tassey – female vocals
- Guillermo Goldschmied – bass
- Adam Marks – keys

== Awards and nominations ==
Covey's premier track 'Comes and Goes' won BostInno’s “Song of the Week," and Covey was named “New England Band of the Month” by Deli Magazine.

== Discography ==
Studio albums

- Haggarty (2017)
- Some Cats Live, Some Cats Die (2019)
- Class of Cardinal Sin (2021)
- Middle Ground (2024)

== Tours ==
- Bless My Cardinal Sin Tour (2022)
