= Allegra Krieger =

American indie rock musician

Allegra Krieger is an American indie rock musician based in New York City. Krieger has released five full-length albums and a collection of B-Sides to date.

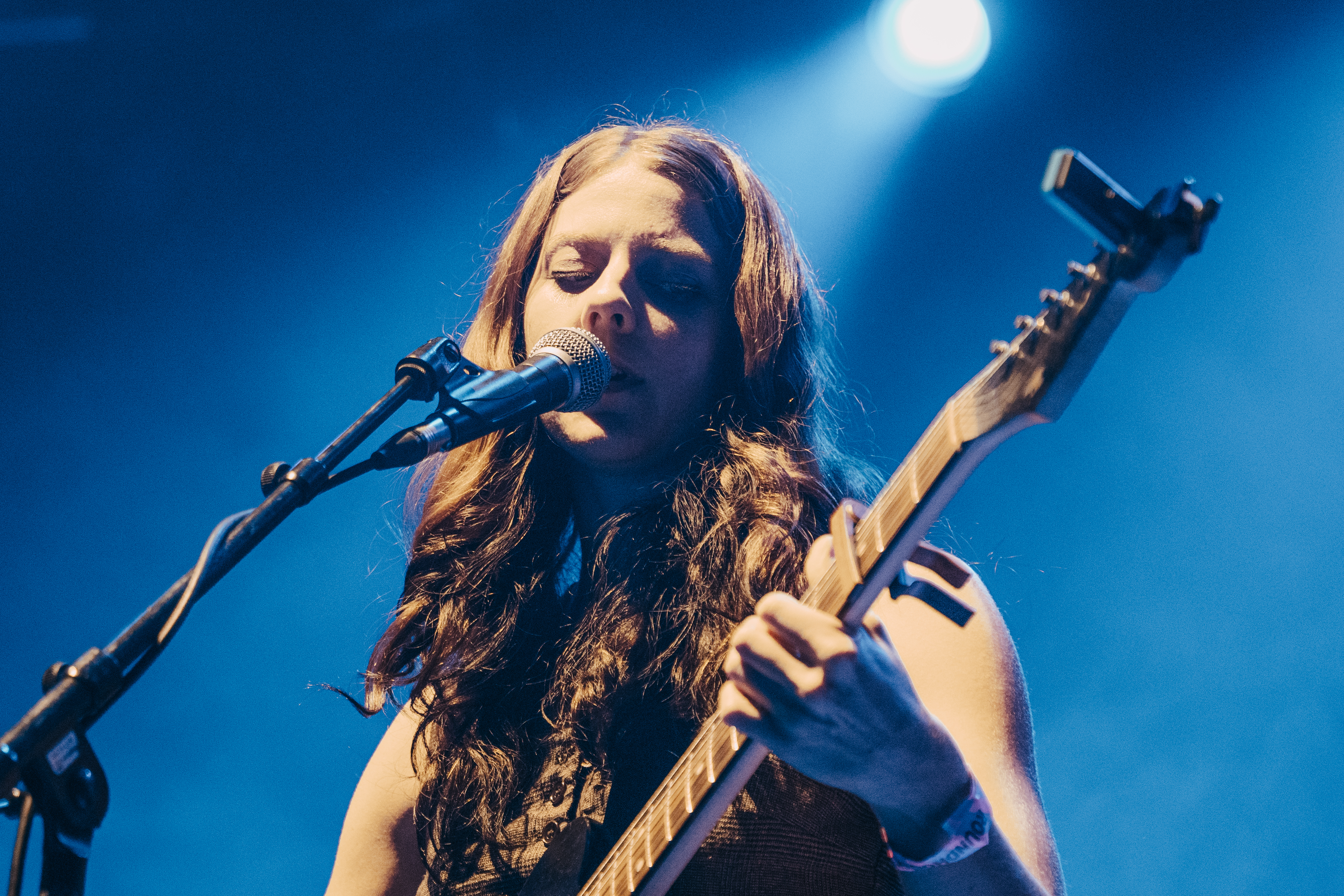
Krieger in 2025

== History ==
Krieger's first album, The Joys of Forgetting, was released in August 2020 on Northern Spy Records. Krieger's second full-length album, Precious Thing, was released in March 2022. Krieger's third and latest full-length album, I Keep My Feet on the Fragile Plane, was released through Double Double Whammy in 2023. The album received positive reviews.
