= Il Bambino =

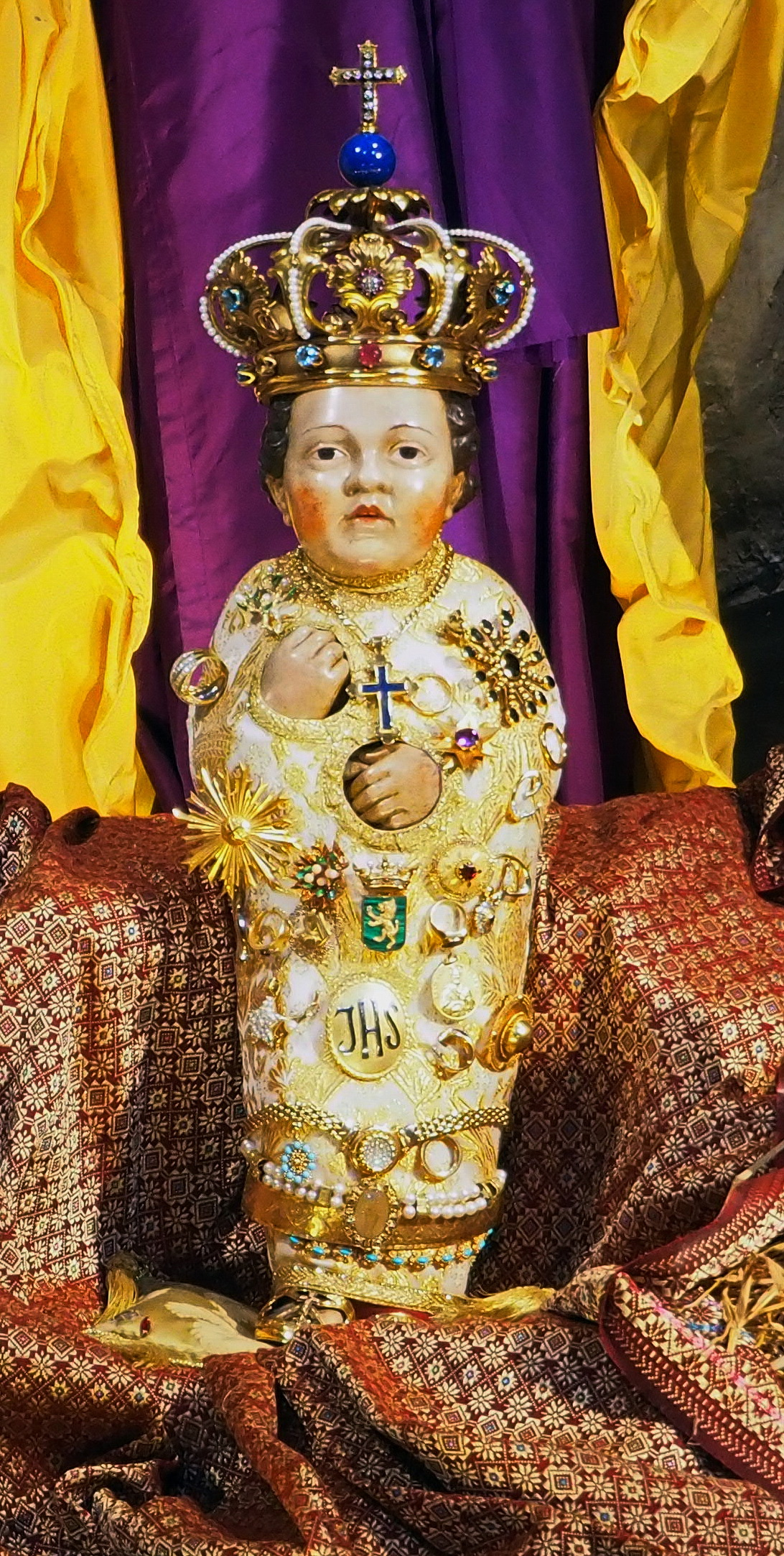
Santo Bambino of Aracoeli, Santa Maria in Aracoeli, Rome

Il Bambino (Italian for "the Child") is the name given in Italy to images of the Christ Child or infant Jesus common in Roman Catholic churches. The most famous is the miracle-working Santo Bambino of Aracoeli in the church of Santa Maria in Aracoeli in Rome, the festival of which is celebrated on the feast of the Epiphany (January 6).

It is also a name for the Sleeping Cupid by Michelangelo, now lost. Michelangelo sculpted the statue from a block of scrap marble, then rubbed it with dirt and a wire brush to artificially age it. The sculpture was sold to a collector as an Ancient Greek sculpture.
