= LVL UP =

American rock band

- Origin: Purchase, New York, United States
- Genres: Lo-fi, indie rock, alternative rock, emo, punk rock
- Years active: 2011–2018
- Labels: Sub Pop, Double Double Whammy, Exploding In Sound Records, Run For Cover Records, Evil Weevil Records
- Past members: Mike Caridi; Dave Benton; Nick Corbo; Greg Rutkin; Ben Smith
- Website: lvlup.bandcamp.com

LVL UP was an American lo-fi band from Purchase, New York, United States.

== History ==
LVL UP formed in 2011 at SUNY Purchase as a recording project between Mike Caridi, Dave Benton, and their friend Ben Smith, with the original intention of releasing a split cassette with Nick Corbo's then-solo material. They instead released their debut album, Space Brothers via Evil Weevil Records, as one band, and Greg Rutkin joined shortly afterwards for the group's first show. Smith left the band for personal reasons just before the release of second album Hoodwink'd, a joint release on Caridi and Benton's label Double Double Whammy and Exploding in Sound.

In 2016, the band's third LP Return to Love was released by Sub Pop. The album received favorable reviews with comparisons being drawn to the works of Dinosaur Jr. and Pavement.

On June 11, 2018, the band announced they were retiring the project after their fall tour. Their last show was September 28 in New York City.

== Band members ==
- Mike Caridi – guitar, vocals
- Dave Benton – guitar, vocals
- Nick Corbo – bass, vocals
- Greg Rutkin – drums
- Ben Smith – guitar

== Discography ==
Studio albums

- Space Brothers (2011)
- Hoodwink'd (2014)
- Return to Love (2016)

EPs

- Extra Worlds (2013)
- Three Songs (2015)

Splits

- LVL UP / Porches 7" (2013)
- LVL UP / Krill / Ovlov / Radiator Hospital 7" (2014)
- LVL UP / Frankie Cosmos 7" (2018)
