= Florist (band) =

American indie folk band

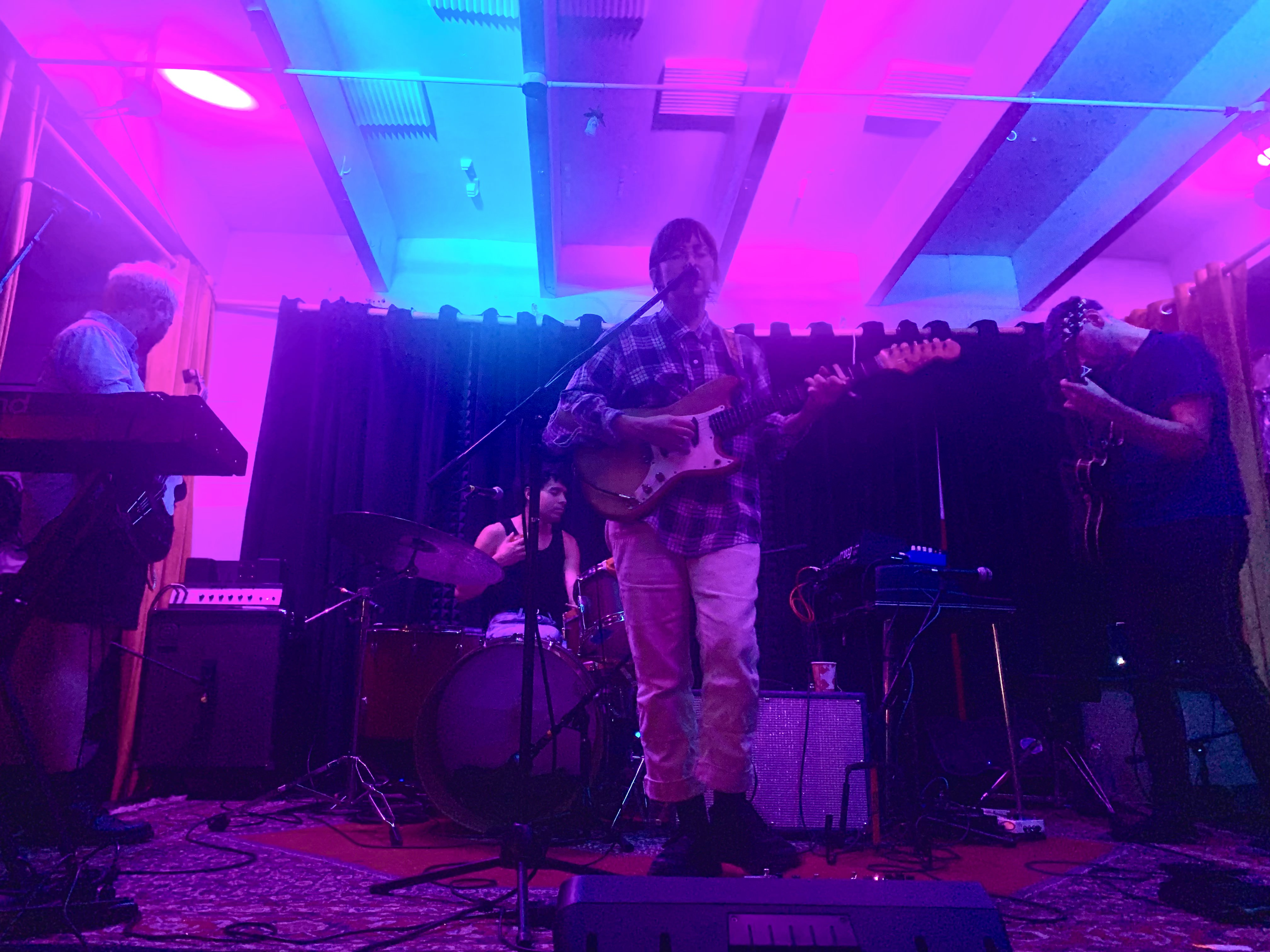
- Florist performing in Nashville, Tennessee, at DrkMttr during 2022 US tour.

Background information
- Origin: Brooklyn, New York City, U.S.
- Genres: Indie pop, folk, indie folk
- Years active: 2013–present
- Labels: Double Double Whammy
- Members: Emily Sprague; Rick Spataro; Jonnie Baker; Felix Walworth
- Website: florist.life

Florist is an American indie folk band from Brooklyn, New York.

== History ==
Sprague met Spataro and Baker while living in Albany, New York. Sprague and Walworth are together a part of Told Slant, a predecessor band formed at Bard College in 2011 with collaborator Oliver Kalb. Florist began in 2013 with the release of a six-track EP titled We Have Been This Way Forever. Florist recorded another six-song EP, titled 6 days of songs, in May 2014, after lead vocalist Emily Sprague was severely injured in a hit-and-run while riding her bicycle. In October 2015, Florist released another EP titled Holdly on Double Double Whammy. Also in 2015, the band was listed on Stereogum's "50 Best New Bands Of 2015" list. The band was also featured as one of Stereogum's "Band To Watch" in 2015.

In January 2016, Florist released their debut studio album titled The Birds Outside Sang on Double Double Whammy. The album was listed at number 34 on Noisey.com's "100 Best Albums of 2016" list.

Sprague is an avid modular synthesizer collector and has made a number of YouTube videos showcasing her equipment. She self-released her debut solo album Water Memory, an ambient album composed with these instruments, in December 2017, with a follow-up album, Mount Vision, released in September 2018.

In 2019, Beyoncé used an instrumental portion of the Florist track "Thank You", from their 2016 release The Birds Outside Sang, in her Netflix concert movie Homecoming.

Florist's third album, Emily Alone, was released on July 26, 2019. The record was written and recorded solely by Sprague, and was granted "Best New Music" by Pitchfork.

Florist's self-titled fourth album was released on July 29, 2022, with the band's original line-up returning to write and record the album. It was met with critical acclaim.

Florist's fifth studio album, Jellywish, was released on April 4, 2025, by Double Double Whammy.

== Band members ==
- Emily Sprague – lead vocals, guitar
- Rick Spataro – bass guitar, keyboards, synthesizers, backing vocals
- Jonnie Baker – guitar, keyboards, synthesizers
- Felix Walworth – drums

== Discography ==
Studio albums

- The Birds Outside Sang (2016, Double Double Whammy)
- If Blue Could Be Happiness (2017, Double Double Whammy)
- Emily Alone (2019, Double Double Whammy)
- Florist (2022, Double Double Whammy)
- Jellywish (2025, Double Double Whammy)

EPs

- We Have Been This Way Forever (2013, self-released)
- 6 days of songs (2014, self-released)
- Holdly (2015, Double Double Whammy)
