= Bellows (musician) =

American singer-songwriter

Bellows is the stage name of American musician Oliver Kalb. As Bellows, Kalb has released four full-length albums.

== History ==
Bellows began in 2010.

Oliver Kalb's first album, As If to Say I Hate Daylight, was released in the summer of 2011 via the record label Waybridge Records. The album was recorded and released while Kalb was a student attending Bard College. In 2014, Kalb (as Bellows) released his second album titled Blue Breath via record label Dead Labour. In 2016, Kalb (still as Bellows) released his third full-length album titled Fist & Palm, via Double Double Whammy. Kalb's 2019 record as Bellows, The Rose Gardner, was released on February 22 through Topshelf Records. Kalb released his fifth album as Bellows in 2022, titled Next of Kin. Bellows sixth full-length album, Que Bello!, was released in 2026.

== Discography ==
Studio albums

- As If to Say I Hate Daylight (Waybridge Records, 2011)
- Blue Breath (2014, Dead Labour)
- Fist & Palm (2016, Double Double Whammy)
- The Rose Gardener (2019, Topshelf Records)
- Next of Kin (2022, Topshelf Records)
- Que Bello! (2026, Bloody Knuckles)
