= Double Double Whammy =

American independent record label

- Founded: 2011; 15 years ago
- Founder: Dave Benton and Mike Caridi
- Distributor: Polyvinyl Records
- Genre: Indie rock; indie pop
- Country of origin: U.S.
- Location: Brooklyn, New York City
- Official website: http://www.dbldblwhmmy.com/

Double Double Whammy is an independent record label founded by Dave Benton and Mike Caridi in October 2011 whilst studying at SUNY Purchase, a liberal arts college in New York state.

== History ==
Double Double Whammy was founded by Dave Benton and Mike Caridi in October 2011. The pair started releasing tapes for their own band LVL UP, and local bands at SUNY Purchase, the college they attended in New York state. They considered the label inspired by other indie rock labels such as Merge and K.

In 2014 Double Double Whammy released the breakout albums from Frankie Cosmos and fellow SUNY Purchase alumna Mitski.

After college the label moved to Brooklyn. Benton left the label in the Fall of 2016, and it has since been run by Caridi. Mallory Hawkins joined the label in 2018 and departed in 2025.

In February 2018, Double Double Whammy and Polyvinyl Records announced a partnership moving forward. Through this partnership, Polyvinyl provides distribution, accounting, webstore fulfillment, and other shared services, while Double Double Whammy maintains creative autonomy.

In September 2018 Pitchfork described the label as largely releasing singer-songwriters that have "a knack for delivering devastating details with a quiet force" and that it has helped "shift the sound of indie rock/pop over the last few years".

== Artists with releases on Double Double Whammy ==
- 2nd Grade
- Allegra Krieger
- Babehoven
- Bellows
- Bread Pilot
- Cende
- Crying
- Flashlight O
- Florist
- Frankie Cosmos
- Free Cake for Every Creature
- Gabby's World
- Gemma
- The Glow
- The Goodbye Party
- Great Grandpa
- Hatchie
- Hovvdy
- Liam Betson
- Lomelda
- Long Beard
- LVL UP
- Mirah
- Mitski
- Quarterbacks
- Radiator Hospital
- Sean Henry
- Skirts
- This is Lorelei
- Told Slant
- Truth Club
- Yowler
