= Gravity's Rainbow =

1973 novel by Thomas Pynchon

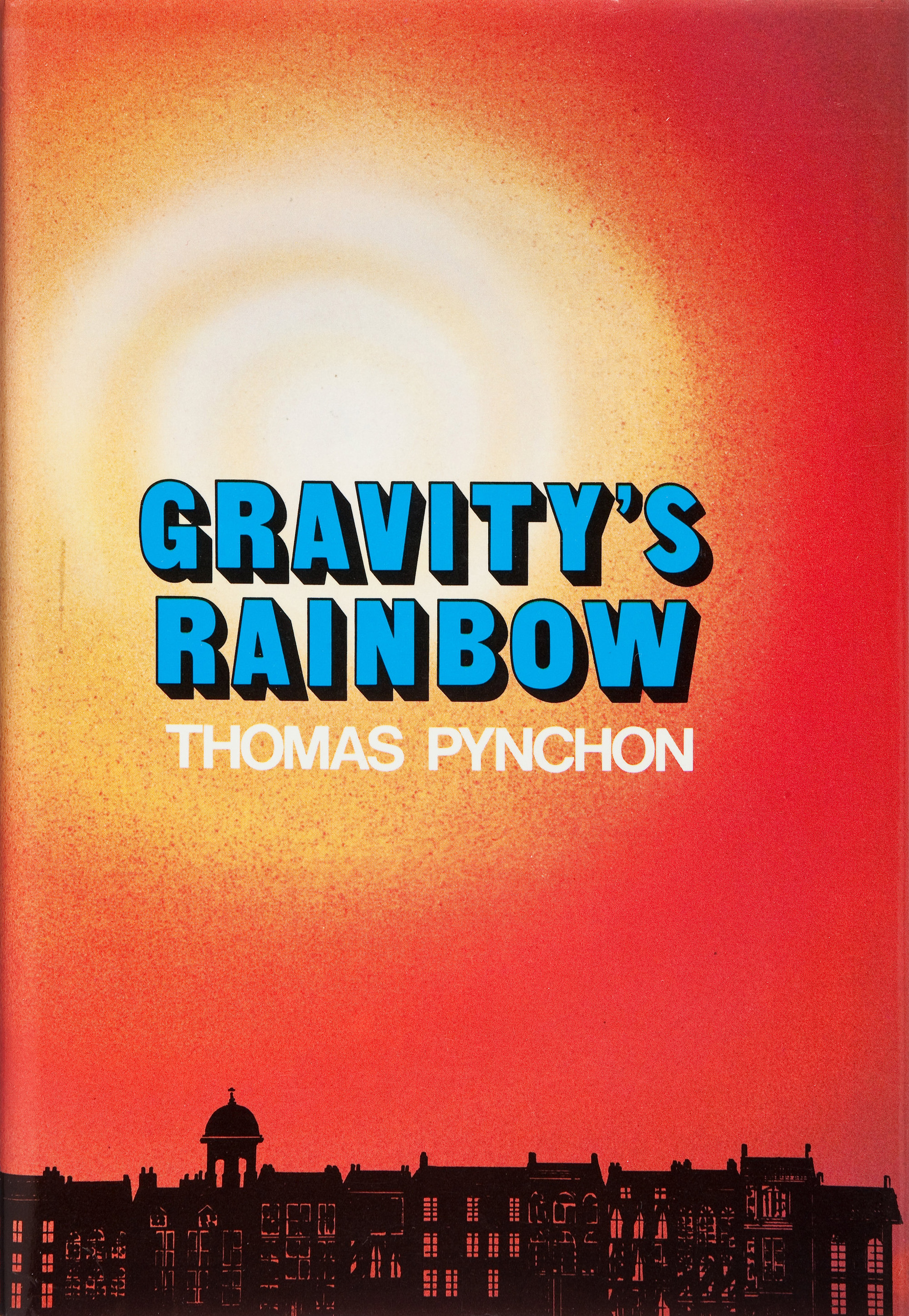
- First edition cover design (Note: Original cover and dust jacket design by Marc Getter.)
- Author: Thomas Pynchon
- Language: English
- Genre: Postmodern literature, historical fiction, satire, encyclopedic novel, science fiction, paranoid fiction
- Published: March 14, 1973 (Viking Press)
- Publication place: United States
- Pages: 760
- Dewey Decimal: 813.54
- LC Class: PS3566.Y55 G7 1973

Gravity's Rainbow is a 1973 postmodern novel by Thomas Pynchon. The narrative is set primarily in Europe at the end of World War II and centers on the design, production and dispatch of V-2 rockets by the German military. In particular, it features the quest undertaken by several characters to uncover the secret of a mysterious device, the Schwarzgerät ('black device'), which is slated to be installed in a rocket with the serial number "00000".

Gravity's Rainbow shared the 1974 US National Book Award for Fiction with A Crown of Feathers and Other Stories by Isaac Bashevis Singer. Although selected by the Pulitzer Prize jury on fiction for the 1974 Pulitzer Prize for Fiction, the Pulitzer Advisory Board was offended by its content, some of which was described as "'unreadable', 'turgid', 'overwritten', and in parts 'obscene'". No Pulitzer Prize was awarded for fiction that year. The novel was nominated for the 1973 Nebula Award for Best Novel.

Time named Gravity's Rainbow one of its "All-Time 100 Greatest Novels", a list of the best English-language novels from 1923 to 2005 and it is considered by many critics to be one of the greatest American novels ever written. It is considered an encyclopedic novel and was among the works featured in Edward Mendelson's essay Encyclopedic Narrative: From Dante to Pynchon, which coined the term.

== Structure and chronology ==
=== Dedication ===
Gravity's Rainbow carries the dedication "For Richard Fariña". Pynchon had been a good friend of Fariña, a folk singer and novelist, since they had attended Cornell University together. Fariña had died in a motorcycle accident in 1966.

=== The layout ===
Gravity's Rainbow is composed of four parts, each segmented into a number of episodes. In the original editions of the book, the episodes were separated by a row of seven small squares. Many readers, reviewers, and scholars, such as Richard Poirier, have suggested that the squares resemble the film perforations known as "sprocket holes" that engage with the teeth in a film camera or projector to advance the strip of film. The squares, however, were inserted by Edwin Kennebeck, an editor at the book's original publisher, Viking Press. Kennebeck denied that the layout was intentional, and later editions of the novel separate the segments with only one square.

=== Part 1: Beyond the Zero (21 episodes) ===
The name "Beyond the Zero" refers to lack of total extinction of a conditioned stimulus. The events of this part occur primarily during the Christmas Advent season of 1944 from December 18–26, coinciding in part with the Battle of the Bulge. The epigraph is a quotation from a pamphlet written by the rocket scientist Wernher von Braun and first published in 1962: "Nature does not know extinction; all it knows is transformation. Everything science has taught me, and continues to teach me, strengthens my belief in the continuity of our spiritual existence after death." The epigraph reflects themes of anticipated redemption and blurring of the sacred and secular, both of which pervade Part 1. The epigraph is also potentially ironic, given von Braun's central role in the development of Nazi Germany's V-2 rocket.

=== Part 2: Un Perm' au Casino Hermann Goering (8 episodes) ===
"Un Perm' au Casino Hermann Goering" is French for "A Furlough at the Hermann Göring Casino". The events of this section span the five months from Christmas 1944 through to Whitsunday the following year, May 20, 1945. The misrepresentation or reinterpretation of identity is reflected in Slothrop's journey as well as the epigraph, attributed to Merian C. Cooper, speaking to Fay Wray prior to her starring role in King Kong, as recounted by Wray in the September 21, 1969, issue of The New York Times: "You will have the tallest, darkest leading man in Hollywood."

=== Part 3: In the Zone (32 episodes) ===
Part 3 is set during the summer of 1945 with analepses (literary flashbacks) to the time period of Part 2 with most events taking place between May 18 and August 6; the day of the atomic bomb attack on Hiroshima and also the Feast of the Transfiguration. The epigraph is taken from The Wizard of Oz, spoken by Dorothy as she arrives in Oz and shows her disorientation with the new environment: "Toto, I have a feeling we're not in Kansas any more...".

=== Part 4: The Counterforce (12 episodes) ===
Part 4 begins shortly after August 6, 1945, and covers the period up to September 14 of that same year; the day of the Exaltation of the Holy Cross, with extended analepses to Easter/April Fool's weekend of 1945 and culminating in a prolepsis to 1970. The simple epigraphical quotation, "What?" is attributed to Richard M. Nixon, and was added after the galleys of the novel had been printed to insinuate the President's involvement in the unfolding Watergate scandal. The original quotation for this section (in the advance reading copies of the book) was an excerpt from the lyrics to the Joni Mitchell song "Cactus Tree" ("She has brought them to her senses/They have laughed inside her laughter/Now she rallies her defenses/For she fears that one will ask her/For eternity/And she's so busy being free").

== Plot ==
=== Part 1: "Beyond the Zero" ===
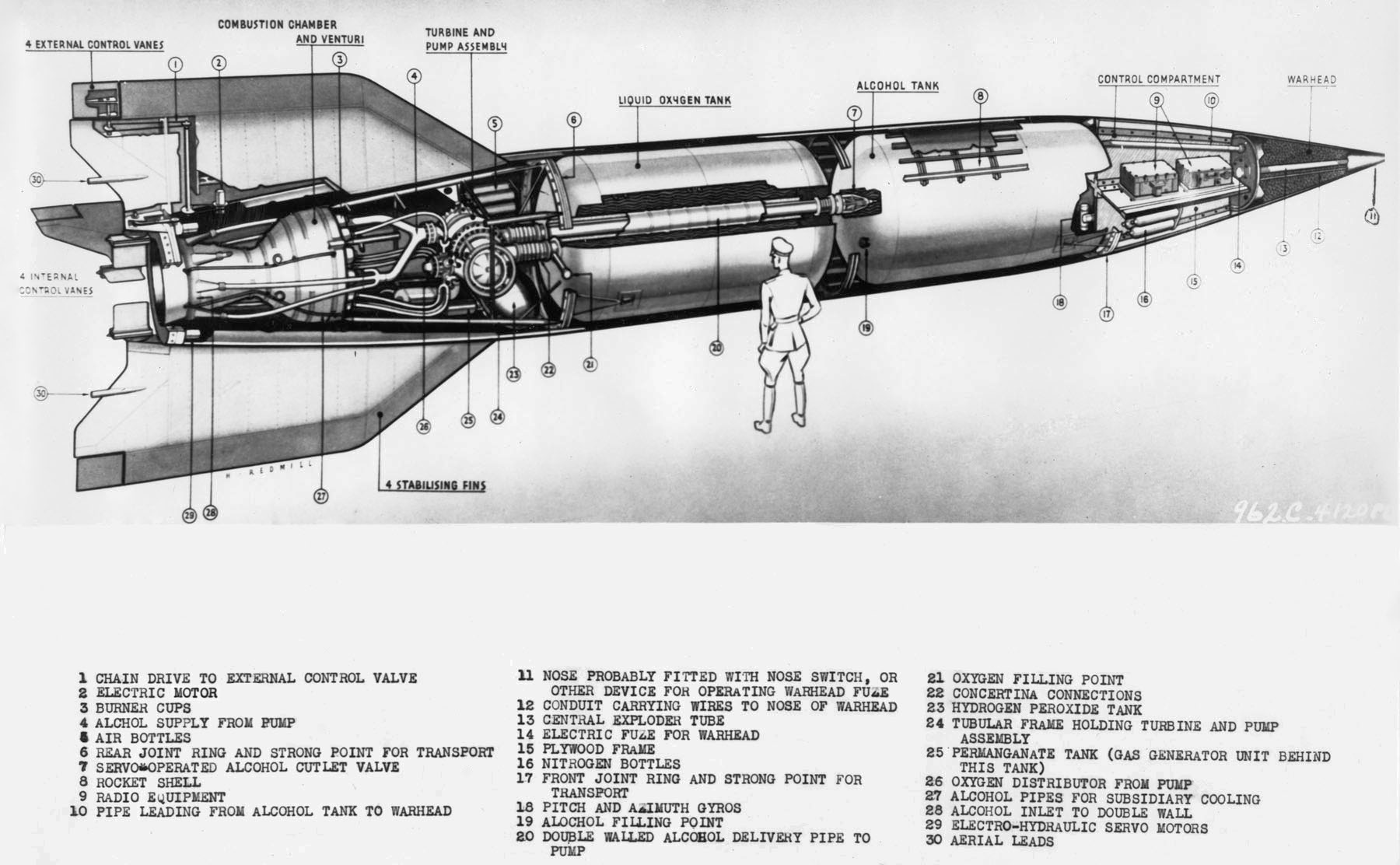
A 1945 U.S. Army diagram of the V-2 rocket

The opening pages of the novel follow Pirate Prentice, an employee of the Special Operations Executive (S.O.E.), first in his dreams, and later around the house in wartime London that he shares with several others in the S.O.E. He soon is driven to the site of a V-2 rocket strike. Pirate's associate Teddy Bloat photographs a map depicting the sexual encounters of U.S. Army Lt. Tyrone Slothrop, an employee of a fictional technical intelligence unit, ACHTUNG. Slothrop and his background are detailed through discussions by some of his co-workers and through references to his family's history, reaching back to early colonial times, in the Berkshire Mountains of western Massachusetts. (There are loose parallels to Pynchon's own family history.) Slothrop's (fictional) home town of Mingeborough is mentioned for the first time (although the town and a young boy named Hogan Slothrop had previously been featured in Pynchon's short story, "The Secret Integration"). That family setting will be mentioned several times much later in the novel, following the family's decline over time within a Puritan legacy of sterility and death.

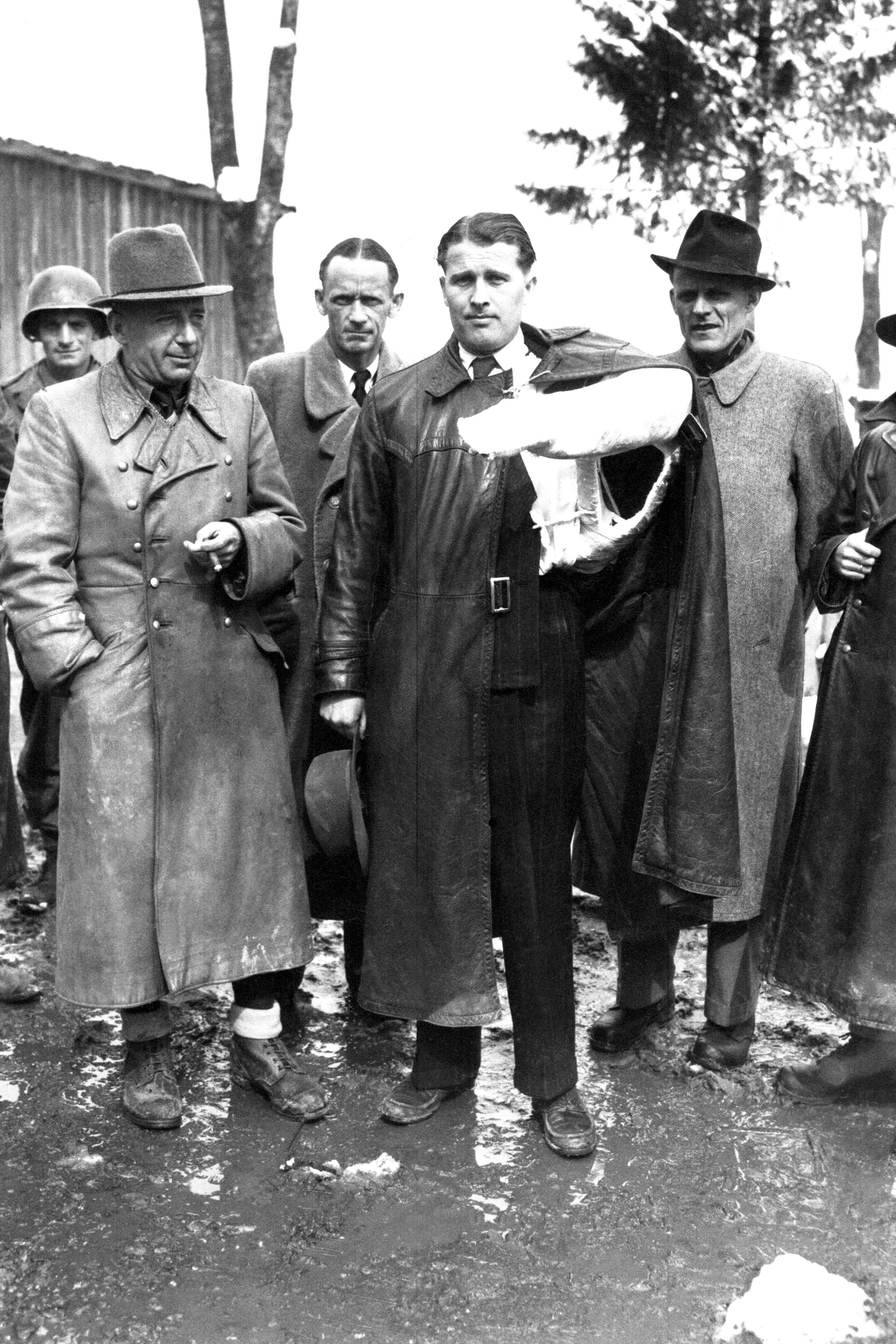
This May 3, 1945 image of Wernher von Braun (center right) is referred to in the narrative, giving a quite exact timeframe for some events in the book.

Employees of a fictional top secret psychological warfare agency called PISCES, headquartered at a former insane asylum known as "The White Visitation", investigate Slothrop's map of his presumed sexual encounters in London, finding that each location appears to precede a V-2 rocket strike in the same place by several days. This coincidence intrigues Pavlovian behavioral psychologist Edward W. Pointsman, who thinks there may be a direct causal relationship between Slothrop's erections and the missile strikes, and his associate, statistician Roger Mexico, who suggests that the relationship is only a random coincidence of probabilities, as seen in Poisson distributions, leading to further reflections in this section and later on topics as broad as the occult, Determinism, the reverse flow of time, and the sexuality of the rocket itself. Pointsman is all the more intrigued to find that as a baby, Slothrop had been subjected to behavioral experiments conducted by a Dr. Laszlo Jamf that involved the stimulation of his penis to erections.

Many characters not significant until later are introduced in "Beyond the Zero", including one of Dr. Jamf's former students, Franz Pökler, a German engineer who has worked on early German experiments in rocketry and later on the V-2 rocket, and Pökler's wife Leni, a former student radical. Others who appear significant in Part One, such as Pointsman's associate Thomas Gwenhidwy and Roger Mexico's girlfriend Jessica Swanlake, vanish from the narrative and don't re-appear until much later. Indeed, most of the 400 named characters make only single appearances, serving merely to demonstrate the sheer scope of Pynchon's universe. Character names sometimes consist of outrageous puns (such as "Joaquin Stick") but may also relate to particular traits of that character or to themes within the novel. Some names of historical characters also have thematic relevance. Under the influence of sodium amytal administered through Pointsman's maneuvers, Slothrop has a hallucinatory flashback to a scene in Boston's Roxbury district. References here include "Red, the Negro shoeshine boy", who will much later be known as the Black Power leader Malcolm X, and jazz saxophonist Charlie "Yardbird" Parker, both of whom represent a threat to white racism. Another fictional character, Katje Borgesius, is contacted in this section by Pirate in order to bring her to safety from the Continent to England. Katje had been a Dutch double agent who infiltrated a V-2 rocket-launching battery commanded by a sadistic SS officer named Captain Blicero. Blicero had kept Katje and a young soldier named Gottfried as sex slaves in a perverse enactment of the Hansel and Gretel story. However, Blicero is also revealed to be the code name of a former Lieutenant Weissman ("White Man") who earlier appeared in Pynchon's first novel, V. He has had an ongoing but now-severed relationship with Enzian, a Herero he had brought to Germany from German South West Africa (now Namibia), and who is the leader of a group of Herero rocket technicians known as the Schwarzkommando, who had been helping Blicero in his own project to create and fire a rocket. Katje, on the other hand, will come under Pointsman's control in England, while, as the Christmas season ends, Roger Mexico worries about losing Jessica Swanlake to her other, bureaucratic and sedate, boyfriend, Jeremy (also referred to as "Beaver" because of his beard).

=== Part 2: "Un Perm' au Casino Hermann Goering" ===
Slothrop is sent away by his superiors under mysterious circumstances to a casino on the recently liberated French Riviera, in which almost the entirety of Part Two takes place. He is in fact being monitored by associates of Pointsman, including Katje and a linguist named Sir Stephen Dodson-Truck. One of the more bizarre Pavlovian episodes involves the conditioning of trained octopus Grigori to attack Katje. Early in part two, the octopus attacks Katje on the beach in France, and Slothrop is "conveniently" at hand to rescue her. Katje and Slothrop eventually have sex. At the Casino, he learns of a rocket with the irregular serial number 00000 (Slothrop comments that the numbering system doesn't allow for four zeroes in one serial, let alone five), which features a mysterious component called the S-Gerät (short for Schwarzgerät, 'black device'), made out of the hitherto unknown plastic Imipolex G. It is hinted that Slothrop's prescience of rocket hits is due to being conditioned as an infant by the creator of Imipolex G, Laszlo Jamf. Later, the reality of this story is called into question, as is the very existence of Slothrop's original sexual exploits.

Meanwhile, at The White Visitation, Pointsman brings the unit and its mission under his control. The unit's nominal commander, Brigadier General Ernest Pudding, who is haunted by his traumatic memories of World War I, is brought to (literal) submission through sado-masochistic rituals with Katje, engineered by Pointsman.

Slothrop becomes increasingly paranoid as old associates disappear. He begins to suspect he is being monitored and adopts the persona (one of many) of "Ian Scuffling", a British war correspondent. He escapes from the casino into "The Zone", the coalescing post-war wasteland of Europe, first to Nice in France and then to Switzerland, searching for the 00000 and S-Gerät. In the closing of Part Two, Katje is revealed to be safe in England, enjoying a day at the beach with Roger Mexico and Jessica, as well as Pointsman, who is in charge of Slothrop's furtive supervision. While unable to contact Slothrop (or prohibited from contacting him), Katje continues to follow his actions through Pointsman, who is showing greater signs of mental instability.

=== Part 3: "In The Zone" ===
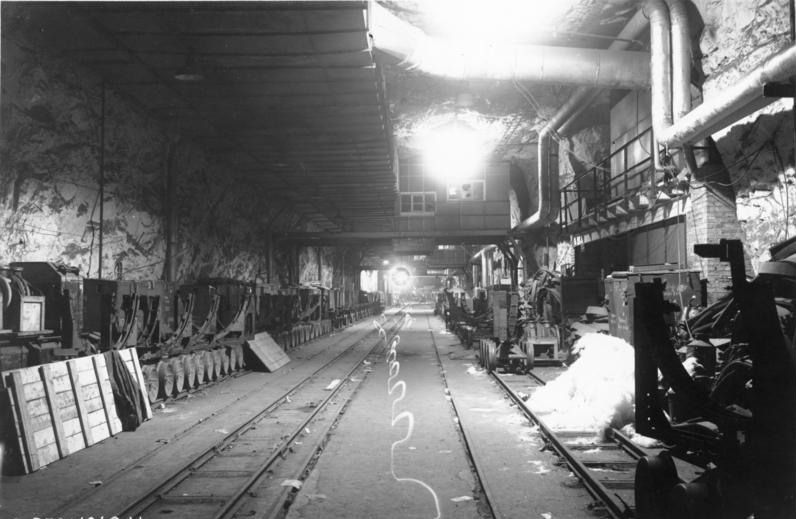
An underground tunnel at Mittelwerk in 1945

Slothrop's quest continues for some time as he meets or is chased by other characters, compared at various times to such characters as Orpheus and Wagner's Tannhäuser. He learns more about his own past, Dr. Jamf's experiments on him, and his father's apparent complicity. In this section, Slothrop comes to doubt that his search for the S-Gerat is a Grail quest and finds his paranoia ("the fear that everything is connected") succumbing to "anti-paranoia" ("the fear that nothing is connected"). On the way, he meets Geli Tripping, a self-described witch in love with a Russian colonel, Vaslav Tchitcherine, who had previously worked for the Soviet state bringing the New Turkic Alphabet to central Asia, especially Soviet Kazakhstan, where he had sought a mystical experience referred to as the "Kirghiz Light". Slothrop and Geli have a near-mystical experience at the summit of the Brocken, the German mountain that was the setting for Walpurgisnacht in Goethe's Faust. Slothrop's travels bring him to Nordhausen, in Germany, and the Mittelwerk, where V-2 rockets were assembled using slave labor from the Dora concentration camp. Confronted by the racist American Major Duane Marvy, he escapes in a slapstick chase.

Slothrop meets members of the Schwarzkommando, a fictional cadre of African rocket technicians, descended from survivors of the Herero genocide of 1904 who were brought to Europe by German colonials. An extensive subplot details a schism within the Schwarzkommando; one faction is bent on a program of racial suicide, while the other finds mystical, semi-religious meaning in the V-2 rocket. Another long subplot details Tchitcherine's past and his quest to hunt and kill Enzian, leader of the latter group of Schwarzkommando and, it turns out, Tchitcherine's half-brother.

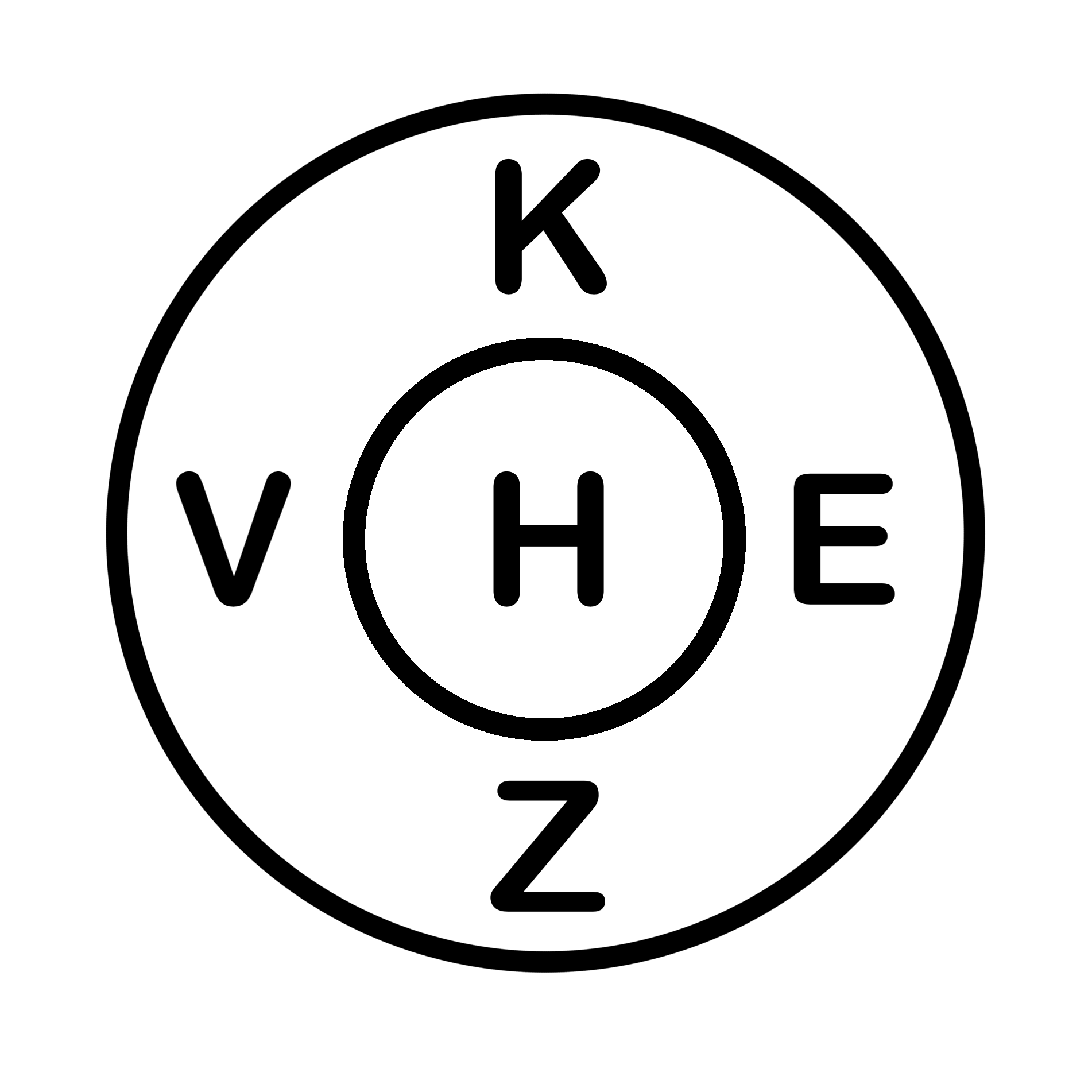
The Schwarzkommando insignia, variously identified as the five positions of the V-2's launching switch, a diagram of a Herero village, and a mandala of mystic significance.

With papers identifying him as former German film star Max Schlepzig in Berlin, Slothrop adopts an operatic Viking costume with the horns removed from the helmet, making it look like a rocket nose-cone and is given the name "Rocketman". One of the people he meets is the American sailor Pig Bodine (who or whose ancestors appear in most of Pynchon's other works). Bodine commissions Slothrop to retrieve a large stash of hashish from the centre of the Potsdam Conference. In the nearby abandoned movie studio that was once the center of the German film industry, Slothrop meets Margherita (Greta) Erdmann, a former silent film actress from the era of German Expressionist film, now in physical and mental decline. Slothrop also comes to meet Gerhardt von Göll, a megalomaniac German director who had previously been seen in Britain, directing a fake propaganda film featuring Black soldiers in Germany. Von Göll is now involved in black market activities. In the longest episode of the book, we learn more of the history of Franz Pökler, who fathered a child, Ilse, with his wife Leni after being aroused by Greta's image in an erotic scene in Alpdrücken, von Göll's "masterpiece". Greta had also become pregnant in the filming of that scene, producing a daughter of her own, Bianca. While working on the V-2 project, Pökler had been coerced into working on the S-Gerät by Blicero, who was holding Ilse in a concentration camp, allowing her to visit Pökler only once a year. As Ilse ages over several years, however, Pökler becomes increasingly paranoid that she is really a series of impostors sent each year to mollify him. Pökler's work for Blicero is tied to the history of organic chemistry, with its own outcomes in the production of dyes and plastics and the international cartels that would come to control them, such as I.G. Farben, and a culture of death-in-life.

Slothrop is led by Margherita to northern Germany and onto the Anubis, a private yacht (named for the Egyptian god of the dead) filled with uninhibited European aristocrats. Here, Slothrop has sex with Margherita's teenage daughter, Bianca. Margherita, along with her partner, Thanatz, are revealed to know more about the 00000, S-Gerät, and Imipolex G than they let on. Ensign Morituri, a Japanese liaison officer, tells Slothrop about how Margherita and Thanatz had brought their traveling sado-masochistic act to Captain Blicero's rocket battery, from which Rocket 00000 had apparently been fired in the spring of 1945, towards the end of the war. Margherita spent many days in a mysterious and ambiguously described factory, where she was clothed in an outfit made from the "erotic" plastic Imipolex G. Slothrop falls overboard and is rescued by black marketeers heading towards Peenemünde, the test site for the V-2 rocket, now occupied by Soviet forces.

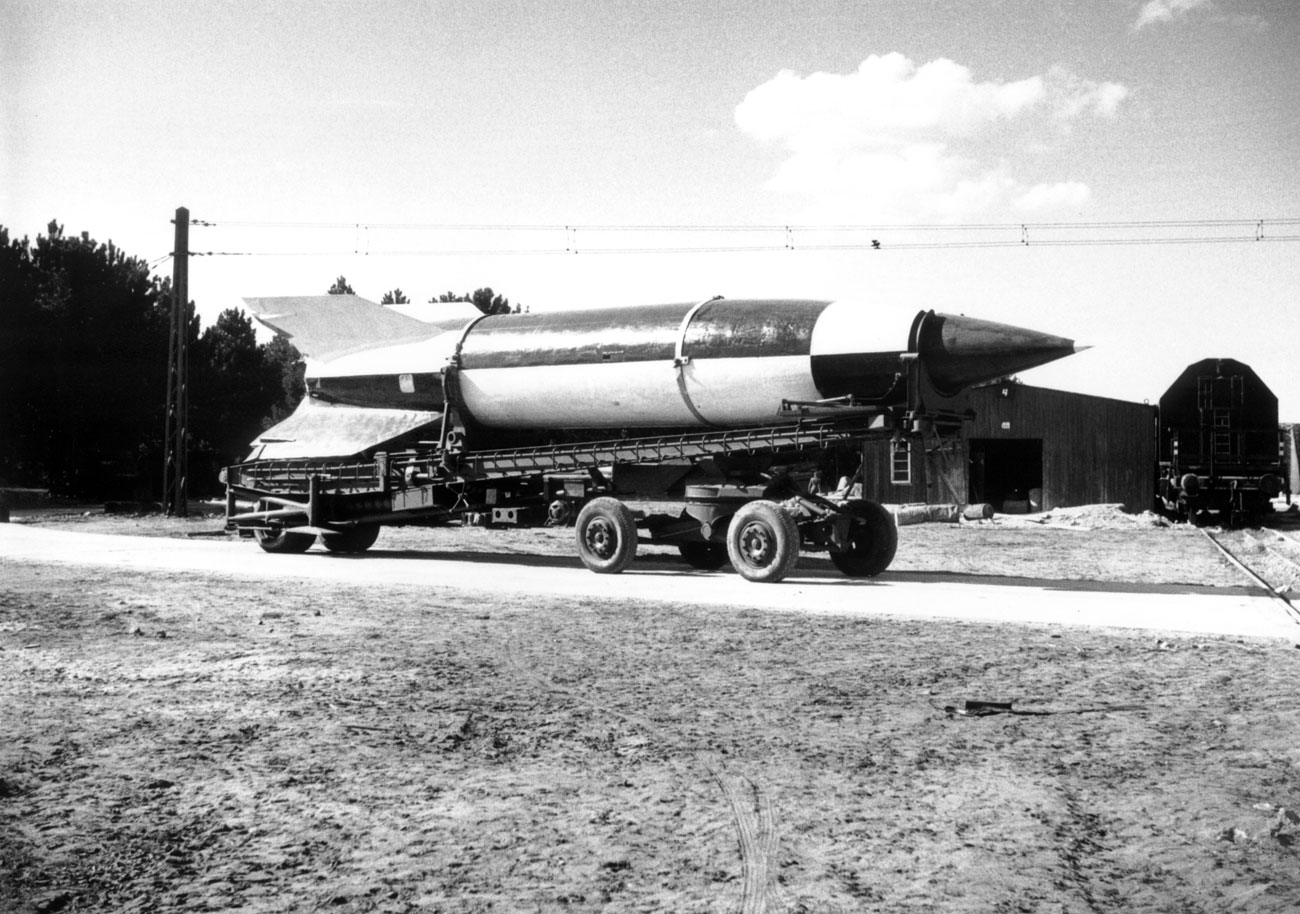
A V-2 rocket near Cuxhaven in 1945, being used in Operation Backfire

Slothrop later returns to the Anubis to find Bianca dead, possibly hastening his already hinted-at decline. He continues his pilgrimage through northern Germany, having changed clothing with Tchitcherine, arriving at Lüneberg Heath and the town of Cuxhaven, also sites of tests and launches by Allied forces of captured V-2 rockets. On the way, he again meets Major Marvy, who fails to recognize him. At a village festival, he is invited by children to don the costume of a pre-Christian Pig Hero, "Plechazunga". Meeting Franz Pökler at the abandoned amusement park where Ilse used to meet her father, Slothrop finds out more about his childhood and the 00000. It becomes steadily apparent that Slothrop is connected to Laszlo Jamf through Lyle Bland, a Slothrop family friend who apparently played a role in funding Jamf's experiments on the infant Slothrop. Bland, in turn, is connected to many threads, including pinball machines and the Masons, that implicate him as part of an international conspiracy of industrial cartels.

Slothrop is introduced to and sleeps with Solange, a prostitute who is actually Leni Pökler, recently freed from a concentration camp herself. In the same building, Major Marvy has found Slothrop's pig costume and dons it, only to be caught, sedated, and castrated by agents working for Pointsman, who believe that Slothrop is still in the suit. Major political and social realignments have been taking place throughout The Zone. Towards the end of this section, several characters not seen since early in the novel make a return, including Pointsman, who is now in official disgrace, as bureaucratic operatives consider how to deal with him. Other characters, including Pirate Prentice and Katje Borgesius, begin to coalesce as a group styling itself as the "Counterforce" in resistance to the emerging post-war military-industrial complex.

=== Part 4: The Counterforce ===
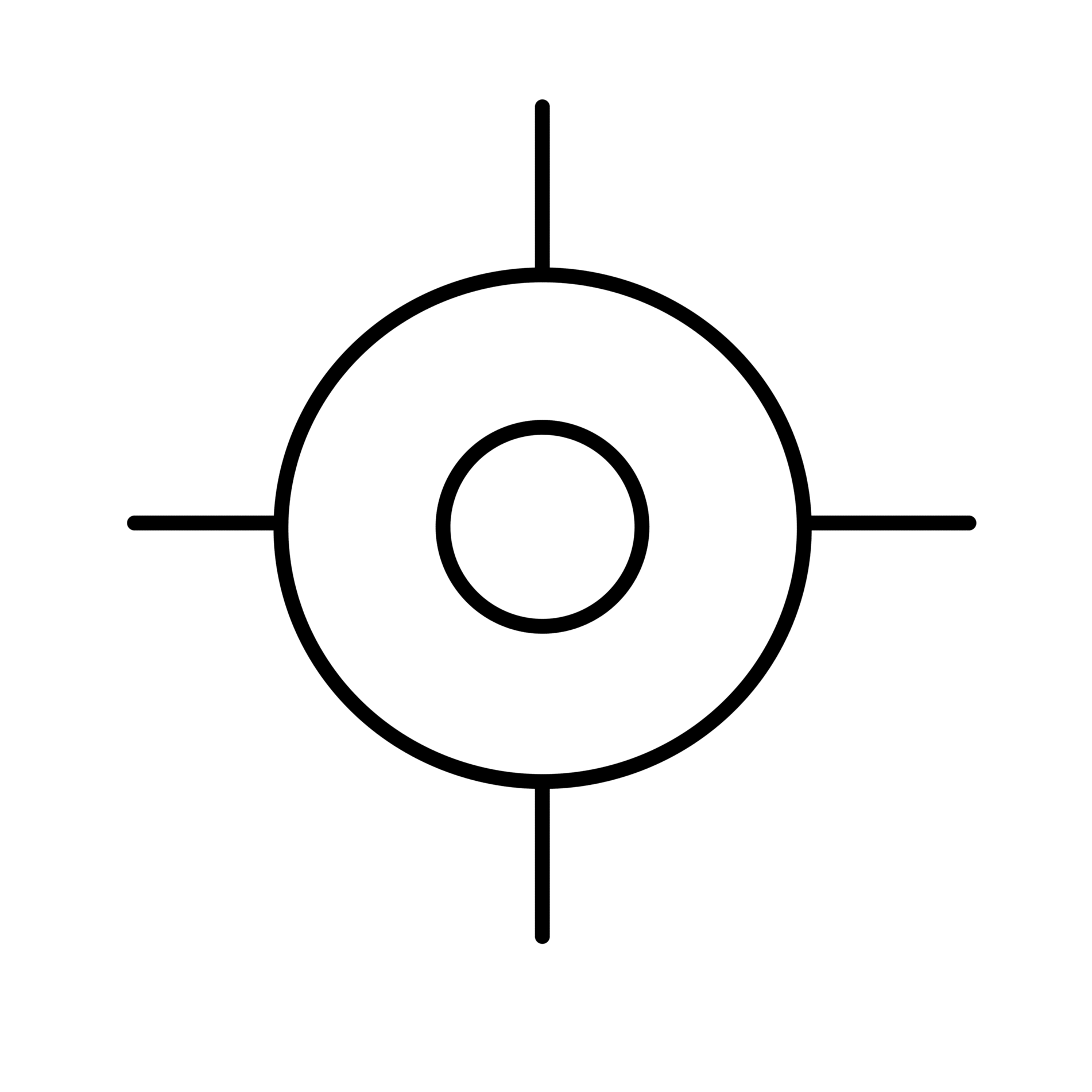
The symbol inscribed by Slothrop, next to the words "Rocketman was here," at the beginning of part 4.

Elements in this section become increasingly fantastic and sometimes self-referential, the narrator at one point saying, "You will want cause and effect. All right" (page 663 in the Viking edition) before explaining how certain events in Part 3 tie in. Despite the efforts of some to save him, Slothrop is repeatedly sidetracked until his persona fragments totally, more than one hundred pages before the novel's end. A flashback reveals how Roger Mexico, now in Germany, has come to join the Counterforce despite its inherent contradictions as a group organizing against international organizations. A long digression gives the story of "Byron the Bulb", a sentient, seemingly immortal lightbulb whose existence links with Dr. Jamf and his experiments and to the integration of power companies and their Grid to the network of cartels. The Schwarzkommando become reunited and finish construction of their own version of the 00000 rocket.

There are several brief, hallucinatory stories of comic, fallible superheroes; silly Kamikaze pilots; and an "Incident in the Transvestites' Toilet" where Slothrop has been hiding in drag. Such incidents may be products of Slothrop's finally collapsed mind; or of the increasingly chaotic state of affairs outside the realm of a rising technological class and society that comes to be labeled the "Raketen-Stadt" (Rocket-City) of the future. For Slothrop, these scenes more or less culminate with his finding, and failing to understand, a headline announcing the atomic bombing of Hiroshima.

Tchitcherine is told by his superior officer that he is to head back to the U.S.S.R. with some German rocket scientists, despite his own misgivings about Marxist dialectics. A conference is held by members of the Counterforce, which now includes some with questionable pasts, personalities, or motives, such as von Göll. Jessica tells Roger that she is going to marry Jeremy/Beaver. Invited to a dinner at the home of a German industrialist, Roger and Pig Bodine manage to escape with the help of some disgusting culinary repartee, but it becomes increasingly clear that the Counterforce does not have the capacity to counter the emerging Rocket State, in part because "the Man has a branch office in each of our brains".

Some individuals, however, provide some hope. Earlier, Slothrop had encountered the young boy Ludwig on what seems to be a futile quest to find his lost pet lemming. Meeting once again, it turns out that the lemming has been found. Geli Tripping's complete love for Tchitcherine and her connection with the natural organic world contrasts with a flashback in which Blicero explains to Gottfried his obsessive desire to transcend nature and "its cycle of infection and death". Geli does cast a spell on Tchitcherine that (perhaps) keeps him from recognizing Enzian when they finally meet, averting a potentially fatal encounter.

The final identification of Slothrop of any certainty is his picture on the cover of an album by obscure English band "The Fool" (another allusion to Tarot, which becomes increasingly significant), where he is credited as playing the harmonica and kazoo. The hundred pages or so of the novel include titled vignettes that summarize events in Slothrop's home town of Mingeborough; offer a (self-referential) reading of the Tarot cards for Weismann/Blicero, who also prepares for a final launch of the 00000 rocket with Gottfried in the nosecone; describe failed last-minute non-rescues by popular culture heroes; and allude to the Sacrifice of Isaac and the mythical figures of Apollo and Orpheus.

As the novel draws to an ambiguous close, the launch of the rocket with Gottfried is intercut with scenes contemporary to the novel's publication, at the (fictional) Orpheus (movie) Theater in Los Angeles, managed by a character named "Richard M. Zhlubb", a thinly veiled parody of President Richard Nixon. Zhlubb is running a "Bengt Ekerot / Maria Casares Film Festival". Both actors played personifications of Death, in Ingmar Bergman's The Seventh Seal and Jean Cocteau's Orpheus, respectively, overt examples of several possible references in the novel to European modernist cinema. The novel concludes as a rocket (perhaps Weissman's) is frozen in its last moment of descent above the theater, where the film being projected has broken, and a hymn composed by Slothrop's heretical colonial ancestor, William Slothrop, is offered.

== Style ==
Poet L. E. Sissman, in his Gravity's Rainbow review for The New Yorker, said of Pynchon: "He is almost a mathematician of prose, who calculates the least and the greatest stress each word and line, each pun and ambiguity, can bear, and applies his knowledge accordingly and virtually without lapses, though he takes many scary, bracing linguistic risks. Thus his remarkably supple diction can first treat a painful and delicate love scene and then roar, without pause, into the sounds and echoes of a drugged and drunken orgy."

The plot of the novel is complex, containing over 400 characters and involving many different threads of narrative which intersect and weave around one another. The recurring themes throughout the plot are the V-2 rocket, interplay between free will and Calvinistic predestination, breaking the cycle of nature, behavioral psychology, sexuality, paranoia and conspiracy theories such as the Phoebus cartel and the Illuminati. Gravity's Rainbow also draws heavily on themes that Pynchon had probably encountered at his work as a technical writer for Boeing, where he edited a support newsletter for the Bomarc Missile Program support unit. The Boeing archives are known to house a vast library of historical V-2 rocket documents, which were probably accessible to Pynchon. The novel is narrated by many distinct voices, a technique further developed in Pynchon's much later novel Against the Day. The style and tone of the voices vary widely: Some narrate the plot in a highly informal tone, some are more self-referential, and some might even break the fourth wall. Some voices narrate in drastically different formats, ranging from movie-script format to stream of consciousness prose.

The narrative contains numerous descriptions of illicit sexual encounters and drug use by the main characters and supporting cast, sandwiched between dense dialogues or reveries on historic, artistic, scientific, or philosophical subjects, interspersed with whimsical nonsense-poems and allusions to obscure facets of 1940s pop culture. Many of the recurring themes will be familiar to experienced Pynchon readers, including the singing of silly songs, recurring appearances of kazoos, and extensive discussion of paranoia. According to Richard Locke, megalomaniac paranoia is the "operative emotion" behind the novel, and an increasingly central motivator for the many main characters. In many cases, this paranoia proves to be vindicated, as the many plots of the novel become increasingly interconnected, revolving around the identity and purpose of the elusive 00000 Rocket and Schwarzgerät. The novel becomes increasingly preoccupied with themes of Tarot, Paranoia, and Sacrifice. All three themes culminate in the novel's ending, and the epilogue of the many characters. The novel also features the character Pig Bodine, of Pynchon's novel V. Bodine would later become a recurring avatar of Pynchon's complex and interconnected fictional universe, making an appearance in nearly all of Pynchon's novels thereafter.

Several characters and situations from Pynchon's earlier works make at least brief appearances in the novel. Slothrop's (fictional) home town of Mingeborough, Massachusetts was the setting for his short story "The Secret Integration", which featured a young character named Hogan Slothrop, who in retrospect would seem to be Tyrone's nephew. Weismann (aka Blicero) and the story of the Herero genocide appeared in the chapter "Mondaugen's Story" in V. The eponymous character Kurt Mondaugen also reappears in Gravity's Rainbow. Some early reviewers even suggested that Gravity's Rainbow was a sequel to Pynchon's first novel, playing on the term "V-2". In Gravity's Rainbow, Clayton "Bloody" Chiclitz is a toy manufacturer accompanying Major Marvy, but he previously appeared as a defense contract magnate in The Crying of Lot 49, and his company Yoyodyne was introduced in V. Pig Bodine also appeared in V. but had his origin in Pynchon's early short story "Low-Lands". Bodine or variants on his name and character also appear in later Pynchon novels. A very minor character in Gravity's Rainbow, Ronald Cherrycoke, would seem to be a descendant of the Reverend Wicks Cherrycoke, who narrates Pynchon's later novel Mason & Dixon.

== Publication and critical reception ==
Viking Press published Gravity's Rainbow on March 14, 1973. Owing to the book's length, the hard-cover edition was priced expensively at $15 (equivalent to $109 in 2025). Viking's president, Thomas Guinzburg, worried that the novel's high price was potentially "inhibiting", leading the publisher to take the uncommon move of simultaneously publishing a soft-cover edition at $4.95 (equivalent to $36 in 2025).

=== Contemporary reception ===
On the novel's publication, it was reviewed in The New York Times by Richard Locke under the headline "One of the Longest, Most Difficult, Most Ambitious Novels in Years". Locke compared Pynchon's writing to that of Vladimir Nabokov, and wrote that "its technical and verbal resources bring to mind Melville and Faulkner. Immersing himself in 'the destructive element' and exploring paranoia, entropy and the love of death as primary forces in the history of our time, Pynchon establishes his imaginative continuity with the great modernist writers of the early years of this century." Locke noted that "Pynchon is obviously capable of the most intricate literary structures—plots and counterplots and symbols that twist and tangle in time and space", but was less impressed by the novel's form: "the structure is strained beyond the breaking point. Reading it is often profoundly exasperating; the book is too long and dense; despite the cornucopia of brilliant details and grand themes, one's dominant feelings in the last one to two hundred pages are a mounting restlessness, fatigue and frustration."

Reviewing the novel in the Saturday Review in March 1973, Richard Poirier stated that "At thirty-six, Pynchon has established himself as a novelist of major importance." In the highly positive review, Poirier compared Gravity's Rainbow to Moby Dick and Ulysses, and that it "marks an advance beyond either book in its treatment of cultural inheritance". Poirier noted the wide range of Pynchon's writing and said that "Pynchon is willing and able, that is, to work from a range of perspectives infinitely wider, more difficult to manage, more learned than any to be found elsewhere in contemporary literature. His genius resides in his capacity to see, to see feelingly, how these various perspectives, apparently so diverse and chaotic, are begotten of the same technology, the same supportive structures that have foundations in the theology of the seventeenth century and the science of the nineteenth." (...) "Pynchon is almost unbearably vulnerable to every aspect of contemporary experience, open to every form of sight and sound, democratically receptive to the most common and the most recondite signatures of things."

Reviewing the novel in a Swedish publication, author and critic Artur Lundkvist noted Pynchon's rare talent but was critical about the wide range of the novel: "Pynchon's weakness appears to be criticlessness, a lack of values, indiscriminate inclusion. Nothing is too high or too low to put into his all consuming machinery. But that makes the meaning of his work ambivalent or undetermined, despite the enormous power of expression and energy in his writing." Lundkvist criticized the influences from popular culture in the novel and concluded "How obvious the frequent transitions between shameless entertainment and ambitious novel art is he runs the risk of repelling two opposite types of readers. Where some find it irresistibly funny others will find it wearisome and boring... Pynchon's uncommon flexible and at the same time consumedly schizoid talent runs the risk of drowning in the rampant excess."

=== In retrospective ===
Anthony Burgess included Gravity's Rainbow in his Ninety-Nine Novels: The Best in English Since 1939 (1984), writing "this work, not yet as widely understood [as V. or The Crying of Lot 49], has a gravity more compelling than the rainbow technique (high colour, symbolism, prose tricks) would seem to imply".

Gravity's Rainbow lost its Nebula Award nomination to Arthur C. Clarke's Rendezvous with Rama. In 1998, Jonathan Lethem suggested that the novel's failure to win the award stands as "a hidden tombstone marking the death of the hope that [science fiction] was about to merge with the mainstream."

On the 50th anniversary of the publication in February 2023, John Semley positively reviewed Gravity's Rainbow in Wired, noting that: "It is at once a busy almanac of its era and a sort of field guide for our own. It echoes eerily in the new-ish millennium. In a way, our own age's greasy stew of absurdity and apocalypticism, creeping death tinged with clown-shoe idiocy, suggests a world that has finally, fatefully, caught up with Pynchon. We are still living under Gravity's Rainbow."

Salman Rushdie has read the character name "Tyrone Slothrop" as an anagram of "Sloth or Entropy".

== Cultural influence and legacy ==
Italian scholar Guido Almansi described it as the greatest American novel published after the end of the Second World War. Sascha Pöhlmann writing for The Literary Encyclopedia stated that it is "often considered as the postmodern novel, redefining both postmodernism and the novel in general". Literary scholar Tony Tanner has hailed it as "both one of the great historical novels of our time and arguably the most important literary text since Ulysses".

Though the book won the National Book Award for 1974, Pynchon chose neither to accept nor acknowledge this award. Thomas Guinzberg of the Viking Press suggested that the comedian "Professor" Irwin Corey accept the award on his behalf, to which Pynchon agreed. Corey's comical address at the ceremony was also noteworthy for being interrupted by a streaker crossing the stage.

Gravity's Rainbow has been translated to many languages, including French (as Rainbow, 1975), Spanish (as El arco iris de gravedad, 1978), German (as Die Enden der Parabel, 1981) and Serbian (as Duga gravitacije, 2019). Episodes of the novel have been translated to Japanese.

=== Adaptations ===
According to Robert Bramkamp's docudrama about the V2 and Gravity's Rainbow, entitled Prüfstand VII, the BBC initiated a project to produce a film adaptation of Gravity's Rainbow between 1994 and 1997. Some unfinished footage is included in Bramkamp's film. The Bramkamp movie includes other dramatized sequences from the novel as well, while the main focus is on Peenemünde and the V2. The 2011 film Impolex by Alex Ross Perry is loosely inspired by Gravity's Rainbow, the title referring to the fictional polymer Imipolex G used to condition Slothrop in the novel. To commemorate 75 years since the end of World War II, in 2019, German public radio broadcasters SWR 2 and Deutschlandfunk produced a 14-hour radio play in German language which was aired in April 2020.

=== Music ===
The lyrics of Devo's song "Whip It" were inspired by Gravity's Rainbow parodies of limericks and poems; Gerald Casale specified:

The lyrics were written by me as an imitation of Thomas Pynchon's parodies in his book Gravity's Rainbow. He had parodied limericks and poems of kind of all-American, obsessive, cult of personality ideas like Horatio Alger and "You're #1, there's nobody else like you" kind of poems that were very funny and very clever. I thought, "I'd like to do one like Thomas Pynchon," so I wrote down "Whip It" one night.

The novel inspired the 1984 song "Gravity's Angel" by Laurie Anderson. In her 2004 autobiographical performance The End of the Moon, Anderson said she once contacted Pynchon asking permission to adapt Gravity's Rainbow as an opera. Pynchon replied that he would allow her to do so only if the opera was written for a single instrument: the banjo. Anderson said she took that as a polite "no."

German avant-rock group Cassiber incorporated text from the novel in their 1990 album A Face We All Know. The use of the text was cleared with Pynchon's agent.

In 1993, Pat Benatar released an album called Gravity's Rainbow after reading Thomas Pynchon's novel.

In 2006, British band Klaxons released Gravity's Rainbow, loosely based on the novel.

In their album Who Really Cares, American Indie Pop band TV Girl references Gravity's Rainbow in the song Taking What's Not Yours, noting it as being left behind in another girl's apartment due to its literary complexity.

=== Art ===
New York artist Zak Smith created a series of 760 drawings entitled, One Picture for Every Page of Thomas Pynchon's Novel "Gravity's Rainbow", also known by the title Pictures of What Happens on Each Page of Thomas Pynchon's Novel "Gravity's Rainbow". Occupying eleven rows and over eleven meters of wall space, the drawings attempt to illustrate, as literally as possible, every page of the book. The piece includes palm trees, shoes, stuffed toys, a lemon meringue pie, Richard Nixon, Sigmund Freud, an iron toad wired to an electric battery, a dominatrix, and other images from the novel. The series had a successful reception at New York's 2004 Whitney Biennial event, and was described "as a tour de force of sketching and concept" (Abbe 2004). In November 2006, Tin House Books published Pictures Showing What Happens on Each Page of Thomas Pynchon's Novel "Gravity's Rainbow", the book of Smith's Gravity's Rainbow drawings.

In 1999 a painting by the American artist Fred Tomaselli, inspired by the novel and titled Gravity's Rainbow (Large), was added to the permanent collection at the Whitney Museum of Art in New York City.

=== Film ===
- Benoit Blanc, a character in the 2019 American film Knives Out, refers to Gravity's Rainbow before admitting that he had not read it, stating that "no one has." In the standalone sequel, Glass Onion, the novel physically appears, being read by Serena Williams.
- An early scene in the 1988 American film Miracle Mile features a character played by Denise Crosby taking what appears to be a copy of a (fictional) study guide, Cliff's Notes: Gravity's Rainbow, out of a briefcase and studies it for a short time. The film deals with the reaction of characters to an impending nuclear missile attack.
- The novel appears in the film Interstellar.

=== Games ===
- In the horror role-playing game Delta Green, PISCES, the United Kingdom's secret paranormal intelligence agency, takes its name from the secret British organization PISCES in Gravity's Rainbow.

== See also ==
- Cosmic bomb (phrase)
- Cinema Rex bombing
- Hysterical realism
- Little Albert experiment
- Metafiction
- Postmodern literature
