= Grapes Upon the Vine =

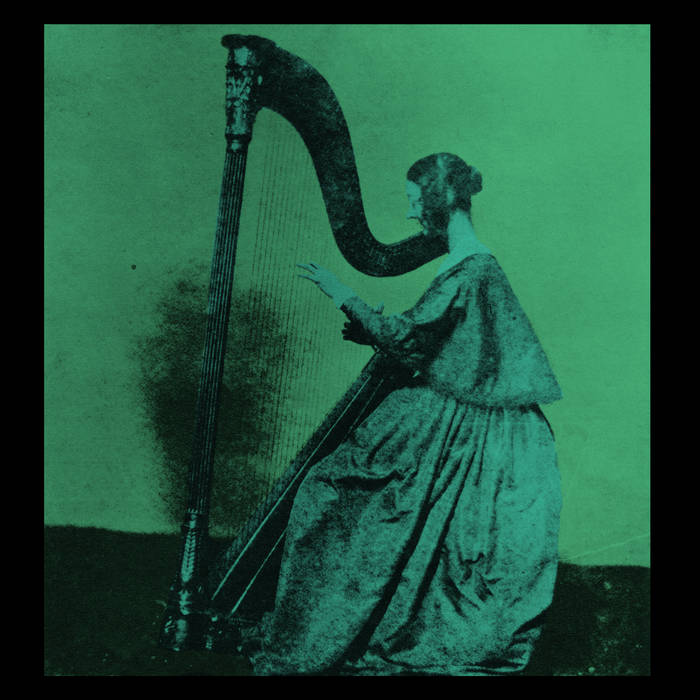

Studio album by TV Girl
- Released: June 30, 2023
- Genres: Indie pop; hypnagogic pop
- Length: 39:45
- Label: TV Girl
- Producer: TV Girl

TV Girl chronology
Summer's Over (2021)	Grapes Upon the Vine (2023)	Fauxllennium (2024)

Grapes Upon the Vine is the fourth studio album by American indie pop band TV Girl. It was released on June 30, 2023, through Blissful Serenity Industry. The album incorporates elements of gospel music and psychedelic pop, featuring prominent soul and oldie samples.

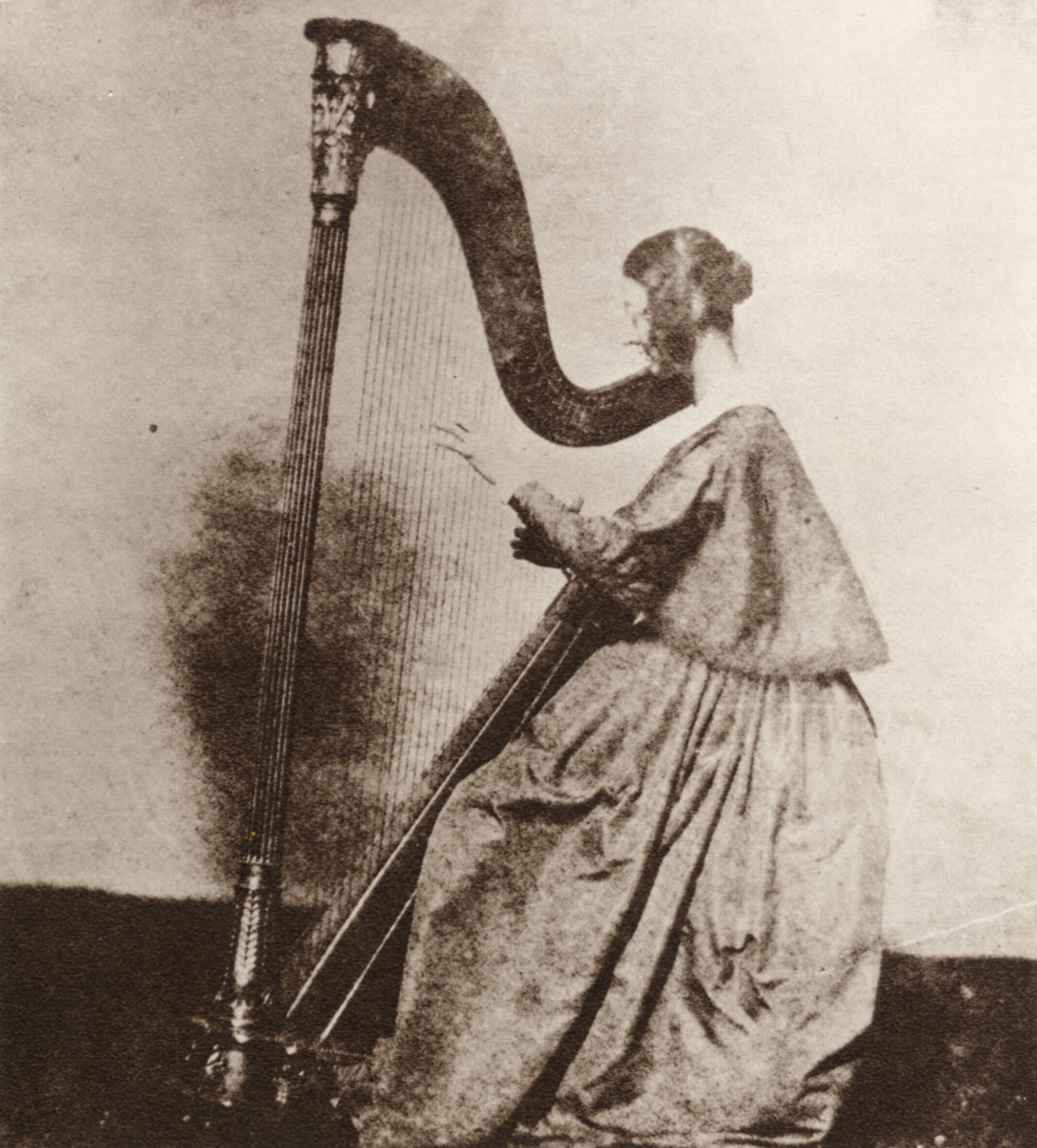
Dame an der Harfe

The album cover is an edited photo taken from 1842 "Dame an der Harfe", a photograph by Henry Fox Talbot, inventor of photographing. The woman in the photograph is Talbot's half-sister, Henrietta Horatia Fielding.

== Reception ==
Mac Weekly describes the lyrics of the album as "take an existential focus, talking about eternity and love, heaven and hell, life and death". Study Breaks described the album as "a unique and thought-provoking musical experience that pushes boundaries and deliver a captivating sonic journey".

== Track listing ==
All tracks are written by Brad Petering.

Grapes Upon the Vine track listing
No.	Title	Length
1.	"I'll Be Faithful"	3:17
2.	"All the Way Through"	2:49
3.	"Hang On"	3:13
4.	"Higher Ground"	3:36
5.	"Shame"	2:51
6.	"One of These Mornings"	3:18
7.	"The Night Time"	3:20
8.	"Big Black Void"	3:52
9.	"Fire"	3:22
10.	"99.5"	2:57
11.	"Grapes Upon the Vine"	3:28
12.	"Heaven Over Our Heads"	3:42
Total length:		39:45

Sample credits

- "Hang On" contains samples of "Song for Steven" by Emily Bindiger.
- "Higher Ground" contains samples of "Song of Praise" by the Five Blind Boys of Mississippi.
- "The Night Time" contains samples of "He's My King" by The Davis Sisters.
- "99.5" contains samples of "Like a Ship" by T. L. Barrett.
- "Grapes Upon the Vine" contains samples of "Unt3" by Julianna Barwick.
- "Heaven Over Our Head" contains samples of "Shine on Me" by The Davis Sisters.

== Personnel ==
Credits adapted from the liner notes of Grapes Upon the Vine.

- Brad Petering – vocals, songwriting, recording, production
- Jason Wyman – recording, production, mixing
- Dan Komin – additional instruments
- Makeda Francisco – additional vocals
- Jordana Nye – additional vocals
