= French Exit (album) =

Studio album by TV Girl
- Released: June 5, 2014
- Genres: Indie pop; dream pop; neo-psychedelia
- Length: 40:43
- Label: Self-released
- Producer: TV Girl

TV Girl chronology
Lonely Women (2013)	French Exit (2014)	Who Really Cares (2016)

Singles from French Exit
- 1. "The Blonde" Released: 11 October 2013; 2. "Pantyhose" Released: 29 December 2013; 3. "Lovers Rock" Released: 2 February 2014; 4. "Hate Yourself" Released: 22 February 2014; 5. "Daughter of a Cop" Released: 15 April 2014; 6. "Birds Don't Sing" Released: 31 May 2014

French Exit is the debut studio album by American indie pop band TV Girl. It was released on June 5, 2014 and follows the release of their first mixtape The Wild, The Innocent, The TV Shuffle and their third EP Lonely Women. The band describe the album's songs as "about lost lust, too much love and not enough."

The album cover is an edited photo taken from Mary Lee Gowland's 1969 poetry collection, Tender Bough. In the album’s liner notes, it is stated that the image was taken by Mary's father, Peter Gowland, and used as the album cover with her permission. The album received more popularity through TikTok, following the increase in usage of the album's ninth track, "Lovers Rock", which has almost 1.6 billion streams on Spotify as of January 2026.

== Promotion ==
=== Tour ===
In March 2020, the band announced tour dates in support of the "six-and-a-half" year anniversary of French Exit, originally starting on April 23, 2020 and concluding on July 23, 2020, which would later be postponed due to the COVID-19 pandemic. The band announced new tour dates for the French Exit 6.5 Year Anniversary tour, with Jordana as an opening act for some shows. The tour started in September 22, 2021 and concluded in December 18, 2021.

== Reception ==
French Exit was called "remarkably solid" by Bandwagon Magazine.

The album was also referred as "refreshing, relaxing, and cynical" by KSUA Radio. KRUI-FM described the album as one with "melodic hooks, prosaic lyrics, and innovative sampling".

== Track listing ==
All tracks are written by Brad Petering, except "Daughter of a Cop" co-written by Mat Cothran.

French Exit track listing
No.	Title	Length
1.	"Pantyhose"	2:57
2.	"Birds Don't Sing"	3:29
3.	"Louise"	3:14
4.	"Hate Yourself"	3:33
5.	"The Getaway"	3:44
6.	"Talk to Strangers"	2:57
7.	"The Blonde"	3:47
8.	"Daughter of a Cop"	2:33
9.	"Lovers Rock"	3:33
10.	"Her and Her Friend"	3:29
11.	"Come When You Call"	3:38
12.	"Anjela"	3:44
Total length:		40:43

Japanese deluxe edition bonus tracks
No.	Title	Length
13.	"Girls Like Me"	2:36
14.	"Misery" (from The Wild, The Innocent, The TV Shuffle)	2:37
15.	"I Wonder Who She’s Kissing Now" (from The Wild, The Innocent, The TV Shuffle)	2:46
16.	"All a Dream" (from The Wild, The Innocent, The TV Shuffle)	3:11
17.	"Melanie" (from Lonely Women)	4:38
Total length:		56:31

Sample credits

- "Birds Don't Sing" contains samples of "Seven Minutes in Heaven", performed by the Poni-Tails.
- "Louise" contains samples of a 1968 interview of Laura Nyro.
- "Talk to Strangers" contains samples of "The World Isn’t Big Enough" by Andrea Carroll.
- "Lovers Rock" contains samples of "The Dance Is Over", performed by the Shirelles.

== Personnel ==
Credits adapted from the liner notes of French Exit.

- Brad Petering – vocals, songwriting, recording, production, mixing
- Jason Wyman – recording, production, mixing, mastering
- Mat Cothran – songwriting (track 8)
- Dan Komin – bass and guitar (tracks 3 and 12)
- Faith Harding – backing vocals (tracks 2, 4–5, 8–9, 11)
- Trung Ngo – additional vocals (tracks 2 and 4)
- Ally Hasche – additional vocals (track 3)
- Wyatt Harmon – additional vocals (track 11)
- Madison Acid – artwork design
- Peter Gowland – photography (used with permission from his daughter Mary Lee Gowland)

== Charts ==
Chart performance for French Exit
Chart (2023–2026)	Peak position
Australian Albums (ARIA)	19
Lithuanian Albums (AGATA)	41
US Independent Albums (Billboard)	49
