= Who Really Cares =

Who Really Cares may refer to:

- Who Really Cares: The Surprising Truth About Compassionate Conservatism by Arthur C. Brooks
- "Who Really Cares (Featuring the Sound of Insanity)", a song by Powderfinger
- Who Really Cares (Janis Ian album)
- Who Really Cares (TV Girl album)
- "Hey, Who Really Cares?", a song by the Whispers from the album The Whispers' Love Story
- "Hey, Who Really Cares?", a song by Linda Perhacs from the album Parallelograms
