= Face the Wall =

Studio album by Jordana
- Released: May 20, 2022
- Length: 30:48
- Label: Grand Jury
- Producers: Jordana; Cameron Hale

Jordana chronology
Summer's Over (2021)	Face the Wall (2022)	Lively Premonition (2024)

Face the Wall is a studio album by American singer-songwriter Jordana Nye under the mononym Jordana. It was released on May 20, 2022, through Grand Jury. It received universal acclaim from critics.

== Background ==
Jordana Nye, better known as Jordana, is an American singer-songwriter. In 2019, she self-released Classical Notions of Happiness, which would be reissued in 2020 through Grand Jury. In 2020, she released Something to Say to You, which combined the Something to Say EP (2020) and the ...To You EP (2020). In 2021, she released a collaborative EP with TV Girl, titled Summer's Over.

Face the Wall is co-produced by Jordana and Cameron Hale. Jordana played every instrument on the album herself. Music videos were released for "Catch My Drift" (directed by Tess Lafia), "Pressure Point" (directed by Luke Orlando), "To the Ground" (directed by Thomas Lange), and "Go Slow" (directed by Luke Orlando). The album was released on May 20, 2022, through Grand Jury.

As for the album's title, Jordana stated, "Mostly, it's about not giving up. The wall can be anything in your way. The album is a sort of reminder to myself that I have to face those things, and I can't take the easy route and turn around."

== Critical reception ==
Professional ratings
Aggregate scores
Source	Rating
Metacritic	84/100
Review scores
Source	Rating
AllMusic	4/5 stars
MusicOMH	4/5 stars
Pitchfork	7.1/10
Under the Radar	7.5/10

According to the review aggregator Metacritic, Face the Wall received "universal acclaim" based on a weighted average score of 84 out of 100 from 5 critic scores.

Matt Collar of AllMusic wrote, "Face the Wall is a more robust production than Jordana's previous album, 2020's Something to Say to You, with a sound that feels more purposefully zeroed in on a professional pop sheen." He added, "much of Face the Wall brings to mind the kind of ebullient, instant-classic indie pop that filtered through college rock stations in the 1990s." Caleb Campbell of Under the Radar stated, "By moving between the worlds of rock, indie dancefloor fillers, singer/songwriter pop, and lo-fi bedroom confessionals, with Face the Wall Jordana begins to carve a new aesthetic core into indie pop, one that feels distinctly her own." He called the album "Jordana's most rewarding record yet, one which delivers on her early bedroom pop promise with a refreshing set of tightly crafted indie pop gems."

Pete Tosiello of Pitchfork commented that "Face the Wall bolsters Jordana's resumé with a cohesive full-length, suspending the polymath approach for a more professional-sounding statement." Martyn Young of MusicOMH wrote, "Her songs here glisten and shine with confidence slightly tempered by feelings of self doubt and trepidation that we can all relate to, certainly in the pandemic world in which this record was created."

On May 20, 2022, Face the Wall was named "Album of the Day" by Bandcamp.

== Track listing ==
All tracks are written by Jordana Nye and Cameron Hale, except where noted.

Face the Wall track listing
No.	Title	Writer(s)	Length
1.	"Pressure Point"	Nye; Hale; Charlie Kilgore	3:25
2.	"Get Up"		2:57
3.	"Play Fair"		2:25
4.	"I Mean That"		2:56
5.	"Go Slow"	Nye; Hale; Kilgore; Jared Maldonado	3:20
6.	"Catch My Drift"		3:12
7.	"Like You Used To"	Nye; Hale; Jeff Melvin	3:05
8.	"To the Ground"	Nye	2:58
9.	"Difficult for Now"	Nye; Hale; Hayden Ticehurst	2:33
10.	"Why"		3:56
Total length:			30:48

== Personnel ==
Credits adapted from liner notes.

- Jordana – production, executive production
- Cameron Hale – production, executive production
- Melvv – co-production (2, 4, 7)
- Mark Evans – co-production (3, 8)
- Charlie Kilgore – co-production (5)
- Jared Maldonado – co-production (5)
- Miro Mackie – mixing
- Dave Trumfio – mastering
- Julia Fletcher – layout, design
- Maya Fuhr – photography
