= Almost Monday =

American indie pop band

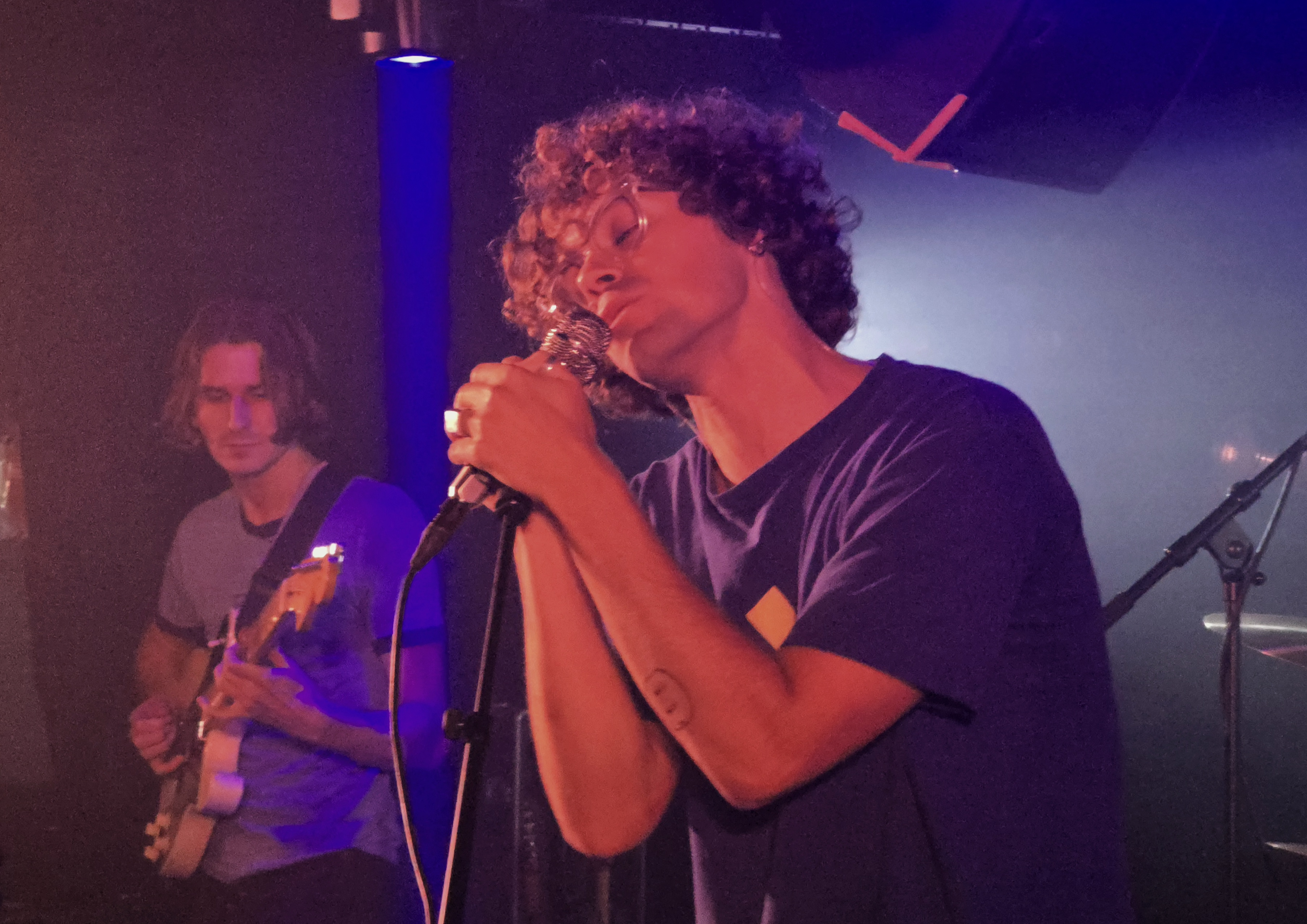
- Almost Monday in 2025

Background information
- Origin: San Diego, California
- Genres: Indie pop, indie rock, alternative pop, pop rock
- Years active: 2015–present
- Label: Hollywood
- Members: Dawson Daugherty; Luke Fabry; Cole Clisby
- Past members: Michael Leto; Daniel Griffo
- Website: almostmonday.com

Almost Monday (stylized in all lowercase) is an American indie pop band based in San Diego, California.

== History ==
Dawson Daugherty, Luke Fabry, and Cole Clisby met while in high school in San Diego's North County area. Fabry and Daugherty grew up together and were longtime friends, and Daugherty met Clisby through surfing. Daugherty and Fabry attended Point Loma Nazarene University, and Clisby went to the University of California, San Diego.

The band was officially founded in 2015 after Daugherty's appearance on The Voice, with the band's first Instagram post being on November 23, 2015. Their first lineup was made up of Daugherty on vocals, bass, and occasional guitar, Fabry on lead guitar and bass, Clisby on rhythm guitar on bass, and an unknown drummer. They initially wanted to call their band The Mondays, but the name was taken; they decided on Almost Monday as an alternative. Their first consistent drummer was Michael Leto, who joined in late 2016, with two unknown drummers playing prior. With this lineup in place, the band would release their first single, "Take Me Higher", in 2017, which received modest local radio play. The band also planned to release an EP, which was recorded at Switchfoot's studio. A few months after its release, Leto would be replaced by Daniel Griffo on drums.

In early 2019, Griffo left the group, rendering the band a trio. This new version of the band released their first single, "Broken People", on April 22, 2019. It reached number 27 on the Billboard Alternative Airplay charts. Soon after, the members changed around their instruments: Daugherty stayed on vocals but would swap bass for occasional rhythm guitar; Fibry switched from lead guitar to bass; and Clisby took over lead guitar duties. Around this time drummer Rafa Vidal joined the group as a touring member. They released two more singles in the first half of 2020; "Parking Lot View" on January 23, and "Come On Come On" on May 29. Their debut EP, Don't Say You're Ordinary, was recorded in San Diego, Los Angeles, and Brooklyn, and released on Hollywood Records on October 9, 2020. The EP was produced by Mark Needham and Simon Oscroft, and mixed by Mark Needham.

On January 26, 2021, they released the single "Live Forever". The band performed at Lollapalooza in August 2021. On April 8, 2022, they released the single "Sunburn" and on June 3, 2022, they released the single "Sun Keeps on Shining." In 2022, they toured with Joywave and The Driver Era. They released the single "Cough Drops" on October 5, 2022. The video for the song, shot in May of that year, featured Vidal on drums. On February 24, 2023, they released the single "Only Wanna Dance" after finishing their North American tour. In the summer of 2024, Almost Monday opened for AJR on AJR's tour in support of their 2023 album The Maybe Man.

The band's debut studio album, Dive, was released on Hollywood Records on September 25, 2024. A deluxe version of Dive, with three additional tracks, was released on January 21, 2025. In support of the album, the band embarked on The Dive Tour, beginning in Seoul, South Korea, on November 14, 2024, before moving through Asia and then to the United States, United Kingdom, and Europe in 2025.

The second single from Dive, "Can't Slow Down", reached number 1 on the Billboard Alternative Airplay chart for February 1, 2025. The song also reached number 11 on the Rock & Alternative Airplay chart, and number 32 on Adult Pop Airplay. Their single "Enjoy the Ride" was released on August 8, 2025. At the 2026 San Diego Music Awards, their single "Lost" was nominated for Song of the Year, and "Enjoy the Ride" was nominated for Best Video. Their single "Leaving Is Easy" was released on March 6, 2026, and the single "No More Regrets" was released on May 1, 2026.

Almost Monday played the Outside Lands festival in San Francisco on August 8, 2025. They went on a US tour with The Band Camino on their NeverAlways Tour from October 10 to November 22, 2025. They toured with Young the Giant and Cold War Kids in North America from May 24 through June 27, 2026. They were nominated for a 2026 iHeartRadio Music Award for Best New Alternative Artist.

On June 18, 2026, the band announced their second studio album, Thank God It's Almost Monday. It was released on September 9, 2026, on Hollywood Records. They announced a headline tour from September 27 to November 21, 2026, starting in Hartford, Connecticut, and ending in Salt Lake City, Utah.

== Band members ==
Almost Monday at Studioeins in 2026

Current

- Dawson Daugherty – lead vocals, rhythm guitar (2015–present); bass (2015–2019)
- Luke Fabry – bass, backing vocals (2015–present); keyboards (2019–present); lead guitar (2015–2019)
- Cole Clisby – lead guitar, backing vocals (2015–present); bass (2015–2019)

Session and touring

- Rafa Vidal – drums, percussion, drum pads, backing vocals (2019–present; touring and session musician)
- Simon Oscroft – production, guitar, bass, keyboards, drums, programming, backing and alto vocals, engineering, songwriting (2019–present; session musician)
- Matt Chamberlain – drums (2023; session musician)

Former

- Unknown musician #1 – drums (2016)
- Unknown musician #2 – drums (2016)
- Michael Leto – drums, synthesizer (2016–2017)
- Daniel Griggo – drums (2018–2019)

== Discography ==
=== Albums ===
List of studio albums, with selected details
Title	Release details
Dive	Released: September 25, 2024; Label: Hollywood; Formats: CD, digital download, streaming
Thank God It's Almost Monday	Released: September 9, 2026; Label: Hollywood; Formats: CD, digital download, streaming

=== Extended plays ===
List of EPs, with selected details
Title	Release details
Don't Say You're Ordinary	Released: October 9, 2020; Label: Hollywood; Formats: Digital download, streaming
Til the End of Time	Released: July 9, 2021; Label: Hollywood; Formats: Digital download, streaming
Endless Summer 2023	Released: September 11, 2023; Label: Hollywood; Formats: Digital download, streaming

=== Singles ===
List of singles, with showing year released, peak chart positions and album name
Title	Year	Peak chart positions								Album/EP
Title	Year	US Adult	US Alt.	US Pop	US Rock	BRA Air.	CAN Rock	JPN Over.	LTU Air.	Album/EP
"Take Me Higher"	2017	—	—	—	—	—	—	—	—	Non-album single
"Broken People"	2019	—	26	—	—	—	—	—	—	Don't Say You're Ordinary
"Parking Lot View"	2020	—	—	—	—	—	—	—	—	Don't Say You're Ordinary
"Come On Come On"	2020	—	—	—	—	—	—	—	—	Don't Say You're Ordinary
"Live Forever"	2021	—	32	—	—	95	—	—	—	Til the End of Time
"Hailey Beebs"	2021	—	—	—	—	—	—	19	—	Til the End of Time
"This Is Growing Up"	2021	—	—	—	—	—	—	—	—	Til the End of Time
"Til the End of Time"	2021	—	—	—	—	—	—	14	—	Til the End of Time
"Cool Enough"	2021	—	—	—	—	—	—	—	—	Non-album singles
"Sunburn" (Note: "Sunburn" and "Life Goes By" were both later included on Dive.)	2022	—	—	—	—	—	—	—	—	Non-album singles
"Cough Drops"	2022	—	—	—	—	—	—	—	—	Non-album singles
"Sun Keeps On Shining"	2022	—	13	—	—	—	—	—	—	Non-album singles
"Only Wanna Dance"	2023	—	38	—	—	—	—	—	—	Non-album singles
"Life Goes By"	2023	—	—	—	—	—	—	—	—	Non-album singles
"Coast to Coast"	2023	—	—	—	—	—	—	—	—	Non-album singles
"Sweet Feelings"	2023	—	—	—	—	—	—	—	—	Non-album singles
"Is It Too Late?"	2024	—	—	—	—	—	—	14	—	Dive
"Can't Slow Down"	2024	12	1	24	35	—	22	—	—	Dive
"Tidal Wave"	2024	—	—	—	—	—	—	—	—	Dive
"She Likes Sports"	2024	—	—	—	—	—	—	—	—	Dive
"Jupiter" (original or remix featuring Jordana)	2024	—	10	—	—	—	—	—	—	Dive
"Enjoy the Ride"	2025	—	—	—	—	—	—	—	—	Thank God It's Almost Monday
"Lost"	2025	—	18	—	—	—	—	—	—	Non-album single
"Leaving Is Easy"	2026	—	—	—	—	—	—	—	—	Thank God It's Almost Monday
"No More Regrets"	2026	—	3	—	—	—	—	—	39	Thank God It's Almost Monday
"Delicate"	2026	—	—	—	—	—	—	—	—	Thank God It's Almost Monday
"Skinny Dip"	2026	—	—	—	—	—	—	—	—	Thank God It's Almost Monday
"Better Late Than Never"	2026	—	—	—	—	—	—	—	—	Thank God It's Almost Monday
"French Kids"	2026	—	—	—	—	—	—	18	—	Thank God It's Almost Monday
"—" denotes a recording that did not chart or was not released in that territory.
