= Broken People =

Broken People may refer to:

- Broken People, a 2016 album by the band Muddy Magnolias
- "Broken People", a 2017 song by Logic and Rag'n'Bone Man from the soundtrack of Bright
- "Broken People" (song), a 2019 song by Almost Monday from their debut EP Don't Say You're Ordinary
