= Dive (Almost Monday album) =

Studio album by Almost Monday
- Released: September 25, 2024
- Recorded: 2022–2024
- Genres: Indie pop; indie rock
- Length: 28:16
- Label: Hollywood
- Producers: Simon Oscroft; Mark Needham

Almost Monday chronology
Endless Summer 2023 (2023)	Dive (2024)	Thank God It’s Almost Monday (2026)

Singles from Dive
- 1. "Is It Too Late?" Released: April 3, 2024; 2. "Can't Slow Down" Released: May 31, 2024; 3. "Tidal Wave" Released: June 28, 2024; 4. "She Likes Sports" Released: August 16, 2024; 5. "Jupiter" Released: October 25, 2024

Dive is the debut studio album by American indie pop band Almost Monday. The album was released by Hollywood Records on September 25, 2024. The album was produced by Simon Oscroft, known for his work with OneRepublic and Declan McKenna.

== Background ==
Luke Fabry and Dawson Daugherty grew up together and were longtime friends, and Daugherty met Cole Clisby while surfing. Daugherty and Fabry attended Point Loma Nazarene University, and Clisby went to the University of California, San Diego. The band was officially founded in 2015 after Daugherty's appearance on The Voice. The band went through multiple drummers in their early years before deciding to remain a trio. Between 2019 and 2023, the band released many singles and three EPs. Two of the songs from this period, "Sunburn" and "Life Goes On", would eventually make it onto Dive; both were released as singles and included on the Endless Summer 2023 EP.

Starting in 2024, the band began the leadup to Dive's release. The album's lead single, "Is It Too Late?", was released on April 3 of that year. Each of the album's singles had its cover art created by Dave Bowers. On May 29, the song "Can't Slow Down" was premiered on SiriusXM's Alt Nation. The song was then released as the album's second single on May 31, along with a music video directed by Jack Revell. Revell also directed many of the band's previous videos. The third single, "Tidal Wave", was released on June 28. The album was officially announced on August 7, 2024. The announcement was followed by the album's fourth single, "She Likes Sports", on August 16.

Dive, was released on Hollywood Records on September 25, 2024. Exactly a month later, on October 15, "Jupiter" was released as the album's fifth and final single.

A deluxe version of Dive was released on January 21, 2025. This version features three bonus tracks: "Sequoia", a version of "Jupiter" featuring musician Jordana, and "Holiday".

"Can't Slow Down" reached number 1 on the Billboard Alternative Airplay chart for February 1, 2025. The song also reached number 11 on the Rock & Alternative Airplay chart, and number 32 on Adult Pop Airplay.

== Reception ==
The album received positive reviews from critics, with Adam Delahoussaye of onestowatch.com saying, "Seeped in UV rays while seemingly siloed on an island all to themselves, there’s really no wrong turn for the group to take and their debut album proves that." Emma Johnson in The Reporter comments, "“DIVE” is beachy perfection, the summer everyone dreams of having. Almost Monday manages to blend the nostalgic surf music of the mid-20th century with modern pop touches, creating a wonderland where it’s never raining, the perfect temperature and the days seemingly have no end.

== Tour ==
Almost Monday were in the midst of a UK and European tour supporting The Driver Era when Dive was released. The band officially embarked on The Dive Tour on November 14, 2024, beginning in Seoul, South Korea. They continued through Asia for the rest of November. In early 2025, the band toured across the US. They went on a UK and European tour in March, supporting The Driver Era. The band played the Outside Lands festival in San Francisco on August 8, 2025. They wrapped up the Dive touring cycle with a US tour opening for The Band Camino on their NeverAlways Tour from October 10 to November 22, 2025.

== Tracklisting ==
All songs are produced by Simon Oscroft, except "Sunburn", produced by Oscroft and Mark Needham.

Standard edition
No.	Title	Writer(s)	Length
1.	"Dive"	Dawson Daugherty, Simon Oscroft	1:12
2.	"Is It Too Late"	Oscroft, Daugherty, David Charles Fischer, Luke Fabry, Cole Clisby	2:39
3.	"Never Enough"	Daugherty, Fabry, Clisby, Oscroft, Tony Ferrari	2:41
4.	"You Look So Good"	Daugherty, Fabry, Clisby, Oscroft	2:42
5.	"She Likes Sports"	Oscroft, Daugherty, Fabry, Clisby	2:22
6.	"Can't Slow Down"	Oscroft, Daugherty, Sam Hollander, Fabry, Clisby	2:56
7.	"Jupiter"	Daugherty, Fabry, Clisby, Oscroft, Nate Campany, Josh Varnadore	3:02
8.	"Tidal Wave"	Oscroft, Daugherty, Fabry, Clisby, Matthew Castellanos	2:28
9.	"Sunburn"	Daugherty, Fabry, Clisby, Oscroft, Dan Book, Sherman Kelly	2:53
10.	"Seaside Market"	Daugherty, Fabry, Clisby, Oscroft, Ferrari	2:46
11.	"Life Goes By"	Daugherty, Fabry, Clisby, Oscroft, Dani Poppitt	2:34
Total length:			28:16

Deluxe edition bonus tracks
No.	Title	Writer(s)	Length
12.	"Sequoia"	Daugherty, Fabry, Clisby, Oscroft, Castallanos	2:14
13.	"Jupiter" (featuring Jordana)	Daugherty, Fabry, Clisby, Oscroft, Campany, Varnadore, Jordana Nye	3:02
14.	"Holiday"	Daugherty, Fabry, Clisby, Oscroft, Varnadore	2:55
Total length:			36:26

=== Notes ===
- "Sunburn" contains interpolations of "Dancing in the Moonlight", written Sherman Kelly.

== Personnel ==
All credits for Dive are adapted from Tidal and the album's liner notes.

Almost Monday

- Dawson Daugherty – lead vocals (2–14); songwriting (all)
- Luke Fabry – bass (3–10, 12–14); songwriting (2–14); alto vocals (3–8, 10, 12–14)
- Cole Clisby – guitar (3–10, 12–14); additional guitar (2, 11) songwriting (2–14)

Additional musicians

- Simon Oscroft – production, songwriting (all); programming (2, 11, 14); guitar (2, 9, 11); bass, alto vocals, background vocals (2, 11); mixing engineer (9, 11); keyboards (9); engineering (11)
- Mike Daly – steel guitar (1); A&R
- Bob Ferreira – vocals (1)
- Jake Baldwin – vocals (1)
- Ryan Howe – vocals (1)
- Tommy Boynton – vocals (1)
- David Charles Fischer – songwriting (2)
- Rafa Vidal – drums (3–5, 8, 10, 12)
- Tony Ferrari – songwriting (3, 10)
- Sam Hollander – songwriting (6)
- Alisa Xayalith – background vocals (6, 7, 13)
- Josh Varandore – songwriting (7, 13, 14)
- Nate Campany – songwriting (7, 13)
- Matthew Castellanos – songwriting (8, 12)
- Dan Book – songwriting (9)
- Sherman Kelly – songwriting (9)
- Matt Chamberlain – drums (11)
- Danny Poppitt – songwriting (11)
- Jordana – featured vocals, songwriting (13)

Production

- Mark Needham – production (9)
- Adam Hawkins – mixing engineer (1–8, 10, 12–14); mastering engineer (2)
- Chris Gehringer – mastering engineer (1, 3–14)
- Will Quinnell – assistant mastering engineer (1, 3–5, 7–14)
- Stefan Mac – engineer (3–5, 10, 12)
