= Death of a Party Girl =

Studio album by TV Girl
- Released: May 8, 2018
- Genres: Indie pop; dream pop
- Length: 38:09
- Label: Self-released
- Producer: TV Girl

TV Girl chronology
Maddie Acid's Purple Hearts Club Band (2018)	Death of a Party Girl (2018)	The Night in Question: French Exit Outtakes (2020)

Death of a Party Girl is the third studio album by American indie pop band TV Girl. It was released on May 8, 2018. The band described the album while making it as "Love, death, all the big things that people like to write about. Like I need to get them out on paper so they don’t weigh down my spirit".

The song "Blue Hair" gained popularity on Tiktok and hit the US Rock Chart on June 10, 2023.

The album cover is an edited photo taken from an old picture titled "Students at Sargent College exercising" by George Karger.

== Critical reception ==
Album of the Year described the album as "the hazy aftermath of a long night out dreamy, detached, and soaked in nostalgia". The Blue & Gold newspaper described the album as "something rare and unique in the music industry".

The song "Blue Hair" was called "a simple and ambiguous song. Carried by a dreamy, melancholic melody" by The Daily Star.

== Track listing ==
All tracks are written by Brad Petering.

Death of a Party Girl track listing
No.	Title	Length
1.	"Pretty Boy"	3:12
2.	"7 Days til Sunday"	3:27
3.	"Blue Hair"	2:37
4.	"Lonely Girls"	3:04
5.	"Drift Down"	3:05
6.	"Cynical One"	3:36
7.	"King of Echo Park"	3:41
8.	"Legendary Lovers"	3:35
9.	"Every Stupid Actress"	3:28
10.	"Death of a Party Girl"	4:05
Total length:		36:55

Sample credits

- "7 Days til Sunday" contains samples of "Forever" by The Caravelles.
- "Blue Hair" contains samples of "The Minx" by The Cyrkle.
- "Drift Down" contains samples of the song of the same name by Snow Mantled Love.
- "Cynical One" contains samples of "Song of the Magic" by Sagittarius.
- "Every Stupid Actress" contains samples of "Sex For Teens (Where's It's At)" by Stanley Z. Daniels.
- "Death of a Party Girl" contains samples of "New Tomorrow" by The Legendary Pink Dots.

== Personnel ==
Credits adapted from the liner notes of Death of a Party Girl.

- Brad Petering – vocals, songwriting, recording, production
- Jason Wyman — recording, production, mixing
- Lydia Fothergill — additional vocals
- Molly Raney — additional vocals
