= Cosmic bomb (phrase) =

Alternative name for the atom bomb

"Cosmic bomb" was another name for the atomic bomb. It was used for a short period of time in 1945 and 1946. The first New York Times story about the bombing of Hiroshima referred to "this terrible new weapon, which the War Department also calls the 'Cosmic Bomb.'" Another article noted that "what the Army has called the 'cosmic bomb' was not regarded by those responsible for winning the war against Japan as the factor which, of itself, would give the war its finishing touch", and a headline reported "Secret War Nipped Reich Cosmic Bomb."

Thomas Pynchon uses the phrase several times in his 1973 novel Gravity's Rainbow, which is set roughly in the period during which the term was current.

The term rapidly fell into disuse as applied to weaponry, soon yielding to "atomic bomb" (which, in turn, was eventually to yield to "nuclear weapon"). In equestrian circles, it survived for many years in the racing career of a thoroughbred named "Cosmic Bomb" and in the pedigrees of horses he sired.

More recently, the term has been applied to powerful energy surges from celestial objects known as magnetars.
