= Can't Slow Down (Almost Monday song) =

Single by Almost Monday

from the album Dive
- Released: May 31, 2024
- Recorded: 2023–2024
- Genre: Indie pop
- Length: 2:56
- Label: Hollywood
- Songwriters: Simon Oscroft, Dawson Daugherty, Sam Hollander, Luke Fabry, Cole Clisby
- Producer: Simon Oscroft

Almost Monday singles chronology
"Is It Too Late?" (2024)	"Can't Slow Down" (2024)	"Tidal Wave" (2024)

Music video
- "Can't Slow Down" on YouTube

"Can't Slow Down" (stylized in all lowercase) is a song by American indie rock band Almost Monday, released on May 31, 2024, as the lead single from their debut studio album, Dive (2024).

== Background and release ==
On May 29, "Can't Slow Down" was premiered on SiriusXM's Alt Nation. The song was then released as an official single on May 31, along with a music video directed by Jack Revell. Revell also directed many of the band's previous videos.

=== Music video ===
The music video for "Can't Slow Down" was directed by Jack Revell and produced by Aiden Magarian. It features the band battling a bird over a giant egg.

== Live performances ==
Almost Monday made their Television debut performing "Can't Slow Down" on Jimmy Kimmel Live!. The band played it often on their Dive World Tour, with a performance filmed in at The Garage in London, UK, uploaded to their YouTube channel on April 13, 2025. The live video was directed and produced by Jack Lightfoot.

== Chart performance ==
"Can’t Slow Down" reached number 1 on the Billboard Alternative Airplay chart for February 1, 2025, 26 weeks after it entered the chart. The song also reached number 11 on the Rock & Alternative Airplay chart, and number 32 on Adult Pop Airplay. The song also became the fourth most played song on US Alternative Radio.

== Personnel ==
All credits for Dive are adapted from Tidal and the album's liner notes.

Almost Monday

- Dawson Daugherty – lead vocals, songwriting
- Luke Fabry – bass, alto vocals, songwriting
- Cole Clisby – guitar, songwriting

Additional musicians

- Alisa Xayalith – background vocals
- Sam Hollander – songwriting

Production

- Simon Oscroft – production, songwriting
- Adam Hawkins – mixing engineer
- Chris Gehringer – mastering engineer

== Charts ==
=== Weekly charts ===
Weekly chart performance for "Can't Slow Down"
Chart (2024–2025)	Peak position
Canada Modern Rock (Billboard)	22
US Adult Pop Airplay (Billboard)	12
US Hot Rock & Alternative Songs (Billboard)	35
US Pop Airplay (Billboard)	24
US Rock & Alternative Airplay (Billboard)	8

=== Year-end charts ===
Year-end chart performance for "Can't Slow Down"
Chart (2025)	Position
Canada Modern Rock (Billboard)	38
US Adult Pop Airplay (Billboard)	37
US Hot Rock & Alternative Songs (Billboard)	74
US Rock & Alternative Airplay (Billboard)	24
