= Broken People (song) =

Single by Almost Monday

from the album Don't Say You're Ordinary
- Released: October 25, 2019
- Recorded: 2019
- Genre: Alternative rock
- Length: 3:55 (original version); 3:23 (standard version); 3:20 (Sofi Tukker remix)
- Label: Hollywood
- Songwriters: Dawson Daugherty, Luke Fabry, Cole Clisby, Simon Oscroft, Dani Poppitt, Henry Beasley
- Producers: Simon Oscroft, Mark Needham

Almost Monday singles chronology
"Take Me Higher" (2017)	"Broken People" (2019)	"Parking Lot View" (2020)

Music video
- "Broken People" on YouTube

"Broken People" (stylized in all lowercase) is a song by American indie rock band Almost Monday, released on October 25, 2019, as the lead single from their debut EP, Don't Say You're Ordinary. The song is the group's major label debut, with them being signed to Hollywood Records that year. The song was produced by Simon Oscroft and Mark Needham, both of whom continued to work with the band for years to come.

== Background and release ==
The original version of "Broken People" was released on April 22, 2019, with a lyric/music video directed by Caleb Gonzalez posted to Almost Monday's YouTube channel on May 20, 2019. After the release of the video, the band signed to Hollywood Records. After some polishing, the song received a wider release on streaming services under Hollywood, becoming the band's major label debut. This version of the song was 30 seconds shorter than the original. The single release was also backed with a remix by electronic music duo SOFI TUKKER.

"Broken People" was the first track the band wrote together as a trio. According to the group, the song was written very quickly: "we started with a bass line idea and had the demo finished in a day."

"Broken People" went semi-viral on Tik Tok, which led to the song charting on Billboard's Alternative Airplay chart in early 2021.

== Personnel ==
All credits are adapted from Tidal

Almost Monday

- Dawson Daugherty – lead vocals, songwriting
- Luke Fabry – bass, guitar songwriting
- Cole Clisby – guitar, songwriting

Production

- Simon Oscroft – production
- Mark Needham – production, mixing
- Sofi Tukker – remixing

== Charts ==
Chart performance for "Can't Slow Down"
Chart (2021)	Peak position
US Alternative Airplay (Billboard)	26
