= Summer's Over =

TV Girl and Jordana collaborative extended play

EP by Jordana
- Released: October 13, 2021
- Recorded: 2021
- Genre: Indie pop, dream pop, bedroom pop, trip hop
- Length: 21:25
- Label: Grand Jury
- Producer: Jordana, TV Girl

Jordana chronology
Something to Say to You (2020)	Summer's Over (2021)	Face the Wall (2022)

Summer's Over is a collaborative extended play (EP) by American singer-songwriter Jordana Nye under the mononym Jordana and American indie pop band TV Girl. It was released on October 13, 2021, through Grand Jury. It marks the first collaborative release between the two artists.

== Background ==
Jordana Nye, known as Jordana, is an American singer and songwriter, and TV Girl is an American music band. Jordana and TV Girl began collaborating after performing together during TV Girl's French Exit anniversary tour, on which Jordana served as an opening act. Following the COVID-19 pandemic, the artists continued working together and developed material for a joint extended play. The project was released as a new album on October 13, 2021.

== Track listing ==
All tracks are written by Jordana Nye and Brad Petering.

Summer's Over track listing
No.	Title	Length
1.	"Summer's Over"	2:53
2.	"Lo on the Hi-Way"	2:21
3.	"Jump the Turnstile"	3:42
4.	"Sweet to Dream"	2:55
5.	"Ordinary Day"	3:01
6.	"Better in the Dark"	2:35
7.	"The Party's Not Over"	3:58
Total length:		21:25

Sample credits

- "Jump the Turnstile" contains samples of "3-Minute Rule" by Beastie Boys and "Sheer Magic" by Ice Cold Love.
- "Better in the Dark" contains samples of "Night Beat: The Girl in the Park" by Frank Lovejoy and Carol Richards, and "There's Only People Here" by Pisces.
- "The Party's Not Over" contains samples of "Gonna Find Me a Rainbow" by Naomi Lewis.
- "Lo on the Hi-way" contains samples of "When she finds the Way Back Home” by an Unknown Artist.

== Personnel ==
Credits adapted from Genius.

- Jordana – lead vocals, songwriting, production
- Brad Petering – songwriting, sampling, production
