= Who Really Cares (TV Girl album) =

Studio album by TV Girl
- Released: February 26, 2016
- Genre: Neo-psychedelia; plunderphonics; indie pop
- Length: 36:55
- Label: Self-released
- Producer: TV Girl

TV Girl chronology
French Exit (2014)	Who Really Cares (2016)	Maddie Acid's Purple Hearts Club Band (2018)

Singles from Who Really Cares
- 1. "Taking What's Not Yours" Released: 9 October 2015; 2. "Heaven Is a Bedroom" Released: 20 November 2015; 3. "Not Allowed" Released: 18 December 2015; 4. "Cigarettes Out The Window" Released: 22 January 2016; 5. "For You" Released: 16 February 2016; 6. "Loving Machine" Released: 26 February 2016

Who Really Cares is the second studio album by American indie pop band TV Girl. It was self-released on February 26, 2016, and is described by the band as "an album about sex or lack thereof, and its consequences or lack thereof".

== Reception ==
Who Really Cares was referred as "an album that is easy to relate to" by Bandwagon Magazine.

== Track listing ==
All tracks are written by Brad Petering.

Who Really Cares track listing
No.	Title	Length
1.	"Taking What's Not Yours"	3:25
2.	"Song About Me" (with Madison Acid)	4:03
3.	"Cigarettes out the Window"	3:18
4.	"Till You Tell Me to Leave"	3:26
5.	"Not Allowed"	2:47
6.	"(Do The) Act Like You Never Met Me"	4:14
7.	"Safeword"	3:36
8.	"For You"	3:35
9.	"Loving Machine"	3:47
10.	"Heaven Is a Bedroom"	4:38
Total length:		36:55

Japanese CD bonus tracks
No.	Title	Length
11.	"Natalie Wood"	3:59
12.	"Like We Planned" (with Madison Acid)	3:48
Total length:		44:42

Sample credits

- "Taking What's Not Yours" contains samples from the 1992 anti-piracy PSA Don't Copy That Floppy, a 1973 speech by Richard Nixon, and “Strut Your Stuff” by Tom Scott.
- "Song About Me" contains samples of "Roxanne's Revenge" by Roxanne Shanté.
- "Cigarettes Out the Window" and "For You" contain samples of "Love Song to Jom's Girlfriend" by Frankie Cosmos.
- "Not Allowed" contains samples of "You Suck", "FCC", "Fuck Yourself", and "Sue Your Friends", performed by the Yeastie Girlz.
- "(Do The) Act Like You Never Met Me" contains samples of "Spring Love" by The Cover Girls.
- "Safeword" contains samples of "Wisdom of a Fool" by the Royal Jesters.
- "For You" contains elements of "Dating Courtesy" by the Shangri-Las from their Good Taste Tips and "You Are" performed by Frankie Cosmos.
- "Loving Machine" contains samples of "Some Other Time", performed by the Bill Evans Trio.

== Personnel ==
Credits adapted from the liner notes of Who Really Cares.

- Brad Petering – vocals, songwriting, recording, production, mixing, art design
- Jason Wyman – recording, production, mixing, mastering
- Amber Quintero – additional vocals (tracks 2 and 3)
- Ally Hasche – additional vocals (track 3)
- Madison Acid – additional vocals (tracks 2 and 12)
- M. Richard Kirstel – photography (album cover)
- George Hester – photography (liner notes)

== Charts ==
Chart performance for Who Really Cares
Chart (2023–2025)	Peak position
Australian Albums (ARIA)	13
Lithuanian Albums (AGATA)	6
Polish Albums (ZPAV)	67
US Independent Albums (Billboard)	46
