= TV Girl =

American indie pop band

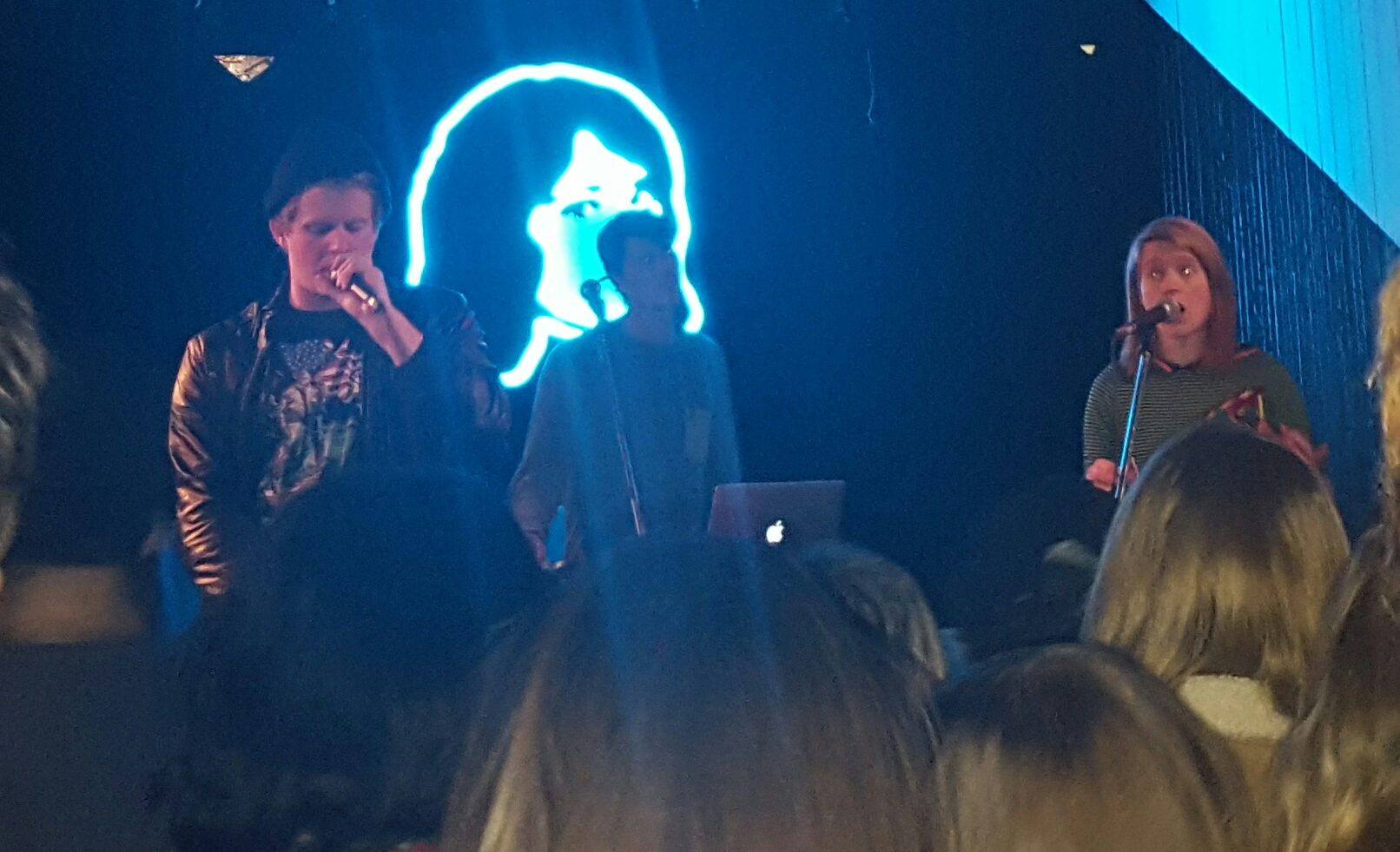
- TV Girl performing in 2017

Background information
- Origin: San Diego, California, U.S.
- Genres: Indie pop; ambient pop; dream pop
- Years active: 2010–present
- Spinoff of: The Movers and the Shakers
- Members: Brad Petering; Jason Wyman; Wyatt Harmon
- Past members: Trung Ngo; Joel Williams; Dan Komin

TV Girl is an American indie pop band from San Diego, California, consisting of lead vocalist Brad Petering, drummer Jason Wyman, and keyboardist Wyatt Harmon.

The band released three EPs with one being made in 2010, one in 2011, and another in 2013 (TV Girl EP, Benny and the Jetts, and Lonely Women) and a mixtape in 2012. Their self-released debut album, French Exit, was released in 2014. In 2016, the band released their second album, Who Really Cares. The album was released on Bandcamp and other platforms on February 26, 2016. Further albums followed in 2018 (Death of a Party Girl) and 2023 (Grapes Upon the Vine), alongside three collaboration albums: Maddie Acid's Purple Hearts Club Band, Summer's Over, and Fauxllennium.

Beginning in 2022, TV Girl experienced a resurgence in popularity on TikTok, leading several previously released songs, most notably "Lovers Rock", "Not Allowed", "Cigarettes out the Window", and "Taking What's Not Yours", to enter the charts in multiple countries throughout 2023, years after their initial release.

== History ==
TV Girl was formed in San Diego in 2010, by friends Trung Ngo and Brad Petering as a leisure activity with no particular ambition beyond experimenting and hanging out. The two had previously been in several bands together, including the Movers and the Shakers. The name of the band is taken from a song by Beat Happening. That same year, the band released their self-titled debut EP, which attracted attention when they sampled Todd Rundgren's 1973 solo version of "Hello It's Me" on their song "If You Want It" from the EP, leading to a takedown notice on the band, issued by Rhino Entertainment, who owns full rights to the Rundgren song.

In 2011, the band released their second EP, Benny and the Jetts, along with a music video for "Baby You Were There". The band began their first live performances that year, recruiting multi-instrumentalist Joel Williams and live drummer Jason Wyman.

In April 2012, TV Girl released the single "I Wonder Who She's Kissing Now", which would be part of their first mixtape The Wild, The Innocent, The TV Shuffle, released a month later. The mixtape was given away for free with an accompanying downloadable coloring book. The release would have constituted their debut album, but according to Petering and Ngo the work was more appropriately defined as a mixtape.

In 2013, they released the single "She Smokes in Bed", which would be part of TV Girl's third EP Lonely Women. That same year, TV Girl underwent a significant change when Ngo and Williams left the band, leaving Petering as its sole founding member. Petering, formerly focused on beats, became the primary vocalist following Ngo's departure, promoting Wyman to a full member and recruiting Wyatt Harmon and Dan Komin soon thereafter (although Komin would leave the following year).

In 2014, TV Girl released their debut album, French Exit, which was called "remarkably solid" by Bandwagon Magazine. The album consists of twelve songs exploring themes of loss, lust, love, and relationships. One of the most popular songs from the album is "Lovers Rock," which gained significant attention on the music distribution platform Bandcamp. Additional tracks were recorded for the album but were not included; some of these outtakes were later released on their 2020 EP The Night in Question: French Exit Outtakes.

TV Girl's second studio album, Who Really Cares, was released on February 26, 2016. The title of the album is derived from the second track, "Song About Me". One of the most popular songs from the album is "Not Allowed", which contains samples from the Yeastie Girlz.

In 2018, TV Girl released their third studio album, Death of a Party Girl, which continued their use of sampling and lo-fi production styles. This was followed by 2023's Grapes Upon the Vine, an album influenced by gospel and soul music, with lyrical themes related to mortality, religion, and consequences.

In addition to their studio albums, the band has released several collaborative projects, including Maddie Acid's Purple Hearts Club Band, which contains samples from 1980s and 1990s hip-hop, Summer's Over with singer Jordana, and Fauxllenium, a collaboration with George Clanton.

== Artistry ==
=== Influences ===
TV Girl frequently samples 1950s and 1960s songs and media in their music. An example of this is seen in the song "Lovers Rock", where the backing track is created from a looped sample of the intro to the Shirelles' 1960 single "The Dance Is Over". In a post on Reddit, Petering wrote that he "never gets tired of seeking out old and obscure music. I listen to lots of music and I find my loops and sounds that way."

=== Musical style and songwriting ===
The band employs a genre not easily defined, with major inspiration from sampledelia, indie pop, lo-fi and electronic music found in most of their works (apparent in albums French Exit, Who Really Cares, Death of a Party Girl and Summer's Over), while taking on more trip-hop-like elements in other works (found especially within Who Really Cares and Maddie Acid's Purple Hearts Club Band), and in some cases, more mainstream characteristics related to gospel, garage house, funk and even jazz (specific to Grapes Upon the Vine). Altogether, the band proclaims themself as a "hypnotic pop" group, due to their use of sampling, keyboards, and reverb effects. The band was upset when their music was labeled "sun-drenched California pop", pointing out that there are no lyrical allusions in their music that warrant the title.

Lyrically, a majority of TV Girl's discography revolves around love and relationships. One example of this tendency is the song "Lovers Rock", a love ballad named after the reggae sub-genre of lovers' rock. The subject matter of TV Girl's songs is generally melancholic and sad, but simultaneously sarcastic and humorous. Some motifs in the band's lyrics include heartbreak, cynicism, memories, cigarettes, hair, sex, women's first names, suicide, and loneliness.

=== Branding ===
TV Girl's album art incorporates color-blocking of images from the 1960s and 70s (such as "The Classic Nude" by George Hester for Who Really Cares). The use of vibrant coloring has become a key part of TV Girl's identity.

== Members ==
=== Current members ===
- Brad Petering – lead vocals, samples, production, occasional guitar (2010–present), bass (2010–2014)
- Jason Wyman – drums (2013–present; touring member 2011–2013)
- Wyatt Harmon – keyboards (2013–present)

=== Former members ===
- Trung Ngo – vocals, keyboards, guitar (2010–2013)
- Joel Williams – keyboards, guitar, vocals (2011–2013)
- Dan Komin – bass, guitars (2013–2014)

=== Touring members ===
- Jordana Nye – bass, backing vocals (2021–2022)
- Zoe Zeeman – bass (2022–present)

== Discography ==
=== Studio albums ===
List of studio albums, with selected chart positions
Title	Album details	Peak chart positions			
Title	Album details	US Indie	AUS	LTU	POL
French Exit	Released: June 5, 2014; Label: Self-released; Format: LP, digital download, streaming	—	19	26	—
Who Really Cares	Released: February 26, 2016; Label: Self-released; Format: LP, digital download, streaming	43	13	6	67
Death of a Party Girl	Released: May 8, 2018; Label: Self-released; Format: LP, digital download, streaming	—	—	—	—
Grapes Upon the Vine	Released: June 30, 2023; Label: Self-released; Format: LP, digital download, streaming	—	—	—	—
"—" denotes a recording that did not chart or was not released in that territory.

=== Mixtapes ===
List of mixtapes, with selected details
Title	Details
The Wild, The Innocent, The TV Shuffle	Released: May 4, 2012; Label: Greedhead Music; Format: Digital download, streaming

=== Collaborative albums ===
List of collaborative albums, with selected details
Title	Details
Maddie Acid's Purple Hearts Club Band (with Madison Acid)	Released: February 27, 2018; Label: Self-released; Format: Digital download, streaming
Summer's Over (with Jordana)	Released: October 13, 2021; Label: Grand Jury Music; Format: Digital download, streaming
Fauxllennium (with George Clanton)	Released: December 2, 2024; Label: Self-released; Format: Digital download, streaming

=== Demo albums ===
List of demo albums, with selected details
Title	Details
Blurry Girls (Demos, Unreleased Songs, and Other Ephemera)	Released: June 21, 2012; Label: Self-published; Format: Digital download, streaming

=== Extended plays ===
List of extended plays, with selected chart positions
Title	Details	Peak chart positions		
Title	Details	US Sales	SCO	UK Indie Brks.
TV Girl	Released: October 21, 2010; Label: Self-published; Format: Digital download, streaming	—	—	—
Benny and the Jetts	Released: July 25, 2011; Label: Self-published; Format: Digital download, streaming	—	—	—
Lonely Women	Released: June 18, 2013; Label: Self-published; Format: Digital download, streaming	—	—	—
The Night In Question: French Exit Outtakes	Released: May 1, 2020; Label: Self-published; Format: Digital download, streaming	41	96	8
"—" denotes a recording that did not chart or was not released in that territory.

=== Singles ===
List of songs, with year released and album
Title	Year	Album
"Girls Like Me"	2011	Non-album singles
"Diet-Coke"	2012	Non-album singles
"I Wonder Who She's Kissing Now"	2012	The Wild, The Innocent, The TV Shuffle
"She Smokes In Bed"	2013	Lonely Women
"Average Guy (Blame)" (with Monster Rally) (Note: "Average Guy (Blame)" was released on streaming platforms in 2023.)	2013	Non-album singles
"Natalie Wood"	2015	Non-album singles

=== Other charted and certified songs ===
List of songs, with year released, selected chart positions, certifications and album
Title	Year	Peak chart positions										Certifications	Album
Title	Year	US Bub.	US Rock	CAN	CIS	EST	IRE	LTU	LAT	UK	UK Indie	Certifications	Album
"Birds Don't Sing"	2014	—	—	—	—	—	—	—	—	—	—	RIAA: Gold	French Exit
"The Blonde"	2014	—	—	—	—	—	—	—	—	—	—	RIAA: Gold; BPI: Silver; RMNZ: Gold	French Exit
"Lovers Rock"	2014	—	13	90	149	126	82	35	101	84	27	RIAA: Platinum; BPI: Platinum; RMNZ: Platinum	French Exit
"Taking What's Not Yours"	2016	—	—	—	—	—	—	—	—	—	—	BPI: Silver	Who Really Cares
"Cigarettes Out the Window"	2016	20	17	—	—	—	—	36	—	—	46	RIAA: Platinum; BPI: Platinum; RMNZ: Platinum	Who Really Cares
"Not Allowed"	2016	4	13	—	—	—	—	27	—	—	34	RIAA: 2× Platinum; BPI: Platinum; RMNZ: Platinum	Who Really Cares
"Blue Hair"	2018	—	11	—	—	—	95	99	—	—	35	BPI: Gold; RMNZ: Gold	Death of a Party Girl
"It Almost Worked"	2020	—	—	—	—	—	—	—	—	—	—	BPI: Silver; RMNZ: Gold	The Night In Question: French Exit Outtakes
"Better in the Dark" (with Jordana)	2021	—	29	—	—	—	—	—	—	—	—	RIAA: Gold; BPI: Silver; RMNZ: Gold	Summer's Over
"—" denotes a recording that did not chart or was not released in that territory

=== Produced albums ===
- Posthumous Release (2013) (by Coma Cinema)
- Ace of Tre (2023) (by Varial Heel)
