= Jordana (musician) =

American pop musician

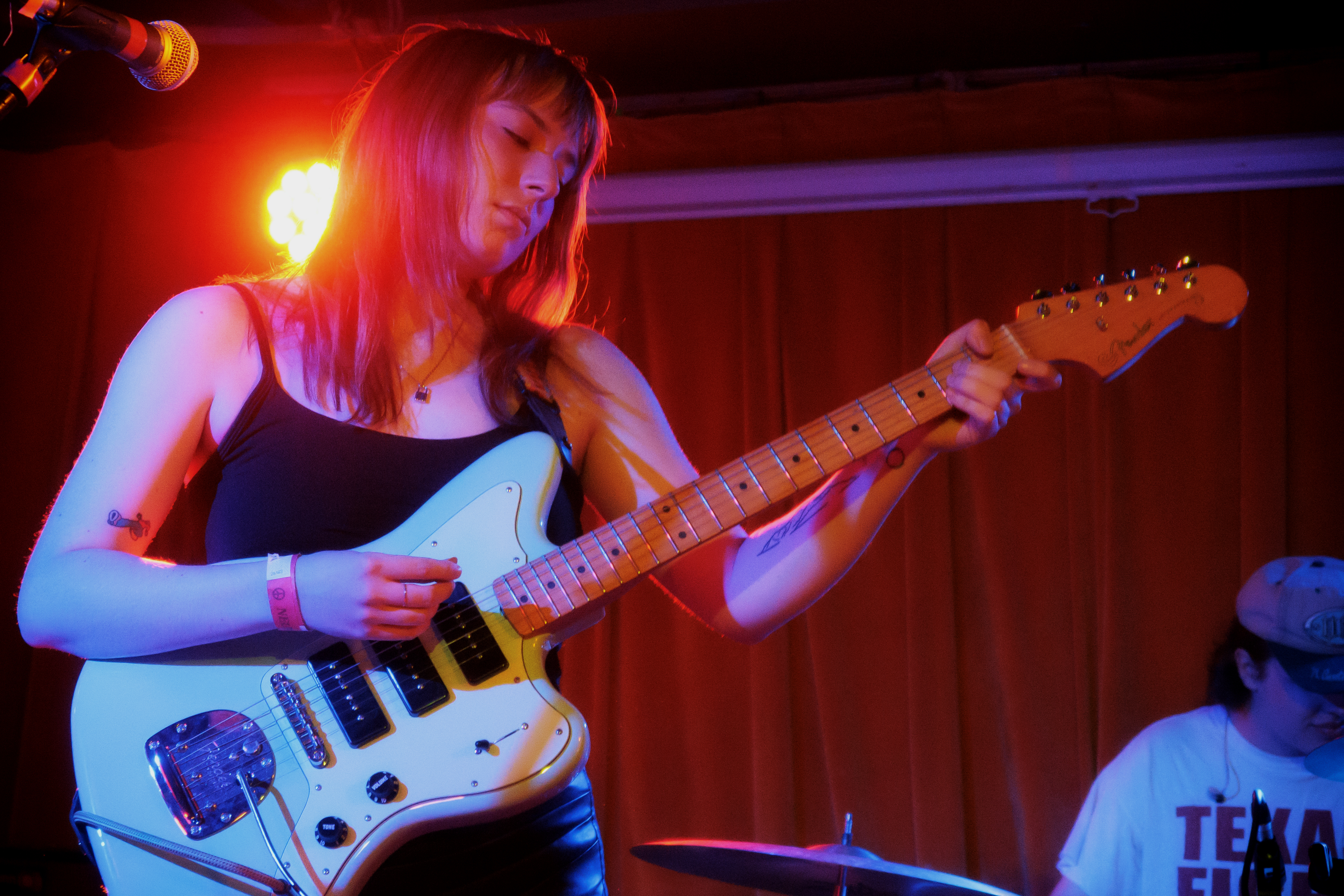
- Jordana Nye performing in 2022

Background information
- Born: Jordana Nye; June 22, 2000 (age 26); Washington, D.C., U.S.
- Genre: Bedroom pop
- Occupation: Musician
- Instruments: Vocals; guitar; bass guitar; violin; ukulele
- Years active: 2019–present
- Label: Grand Jury
- Website: jordana.cool

Jordana Nye (/dʒɔːrˈdænə/ jor-DAN-ə) (born June 22, 2000), known mononymously as simply Jordana, is an American bedroom pop musician.

== Early life ==
Jordana Nye was born on June 22, 2000. Nye's father was an organist at her local church. Upon being recommended by her father, Nye decided to take up an instrument, starting on violin before moving to guitar.

== Career ==
When Nye was eighteen years old, she released an album titled Classical Notions of Happiness. The album received positive reviews and garnered enough attention that the record label Grand Jury offered to sign her and re-release the album in 2020.

On June 30, 2020, Nye announced plans to release an EP. Titled Something to Say, the EP was released July 31. The EP received four out of five stars from NME. On September 15, Nye announced plans to release a follow-up EP titled To You. The two EPs were combined to form Nye's second full-length album, titled Something to Say... To You. The album was released on December 4.

On October 13, 2021, Jordana released a collaborative EP along with the band TV Girl, titled Summer's Over.

On May 20, 2022, she released a studio album, Face the Wall.

In September 2023, Jordana and Yot Club released the single "Safe House".

In February 2024, Dent May released the single "Coasting on Fumes" featuring Nye. On October 18, 2024, she released a studio album, Lively Premonition.

She released an EP, Jordanaland, in November 2025.

== Discography ==
=== Studio albums ===
- Classical Notions of Happiness (2019; re-released in 2020)
- Something to Say to You (2020)
- Face the Wall (2022)
- Lively Premonition (2024)

=== EPs ===
- Something to Say (2020)
- ...To You (2020)
- Summer's Over (with TV Girl; 2021)
- I'm Doing Well, Thanks for Asking (2022)
- Jordanaland (2025)
