= All My Friends Are Funeral Singers (film) =

2010 film

- Film poster
- Directed by: Tim Rutili
- Written by: Tim Rutili
- Starring: Angela Bettis
- Music by: Califone
- Distributed by: Better Angel Films; IndiePix Films
- Release date: January 26, 2010 (Sundance)
- Running time: 84 minutes
- Country: United States
- Language: English
- Budget: $30,000

All My Friends are Funeral Singers is a 2010 experimental drama film directed by Tim Rutili of the band Califone. The film makes extensive use of the music of Califone, and was released as a companion to the band's album of the same name. The film tells the story of a medium, played by Angela Bettis, living with a group of ghosts in the house who want to leave. She finds out that the ghosts were trapped by her grandmother.

== Cast ==
Role	Played By
Zel	Angela Bettis
Karen	Emily Candini
Ted	Reid Coker
Henry	Kevin Ford
Margaret	Megan Hovde-Wilkins
Camille	Karol Kent
Julius	George McAuliffe
Buñuel	Michael McGinley
Alice	Sierra Magdalena Mitchell
Alan	Alan Scalpone
Nyla	Molly Wade
Moe	Wesley Walker
Musicians	Joe Adamik; Jim Becker; Ben Massarella; Tim Rutili
Grandma's voice	Suzanne Sole
Answering machine voices	Taylor Patterson; Roseann Rutili

== Production ==
Rutili began writing the film's screenplay in September 2008, and developed the screenplay alongside the album. The screenplay was completed by December of the same year, but production on the film didn't begin until April 2009. Rutili was heavily inspired by the 1970s Spanish drama The Spirit of the Beehive, in addition to the works of David Lynch.

The film made its premiere at the 2010 Sundance Film Festival. It also screened at the 2010 South by Southwest festival where Califone played the live score and additional concerts.

== Reception ==
The film's reception has been mixed. The Hollywood Reporter noted that the film "will be of interest to fans of the band Califone" and that "filmmaker/bandmember Rutili could edit together some good concert-backdrop material from the more experimental moments." and positive reviews of the film were given by both Express Night Out and Inside Pulse Films, with the latter referring to the film as "trance-like and dreamy — like a washed-out jeans version of Beetlejuice" and "an unqualified crowd-pleaser."
