= Red Red Meat (album) =

Studio album by Red Red Meat
- Released: 1992
- Recorded: Idful, Chicago, Illinois
- Genre: Indie rock, blues rock
- Length: 60:28
- Label: Perishable

Red Red Meat chronology
Red Red Meat (1992)	Jimmywine Majestic (1994)

Professional ratings
Review scores
Source	Rating
Allmusic	4/5 stars

Red Red Meat is the eponymously titled debut studio album of Red Red Meat, released in 1992 by Perishable Records.

== Track listing ==
All tracks are written by Red Red Meat.

No.	Title	Length
1.	"Robo Sleep"	3:00
2.	"Snowball"	4:42
3.	"Molly's on the Rag"	2:04
4.	"Sister Flossy"	8:51
5.	"Idaho Durt"	2:55
6.	"Cellophane Man"	4:22
7.	"Grief Giver"	3:01
8.	"Rabbit Eyed"	4:33
9.	"Hot Nikketty Trunk Monkey"	3:01
10.	"Bag (Nice Round Numbers)"	5:59
11.	"X-Diamond Cutter Blues"	3:11
12.	"Stare Box"	3:07
13.	"P.C.L.M."	2:28
14.	"Rubbing Mirrors"	6:48
15.	"Sandbox"	2:26

Vinyl Reissue Jealous Butcher Bonus Tracks Cat. No. JB127 RELEASE DATE 11/06/2015

No.	Title	Length
16.	"Disco Heathen (Alt Mix)"
17.	"K-Head"
18.	"Grief Giver (w/ Brian)"
19.	"I'm Not in Love"

== Personnel ==
Adapted from the Red Red Meat liner notes.

Red Red Meat

- Brian Deck – drums
- Glenn Girard – effects, guitar
- Glynis Johnson – bass guitar, vocals
- Tim Rutili – guitar, vocals

Additional musicians

- Jimmy Chamberlin – drums (1)
- Ben Massarella – drums (3, 7, 10, 13)

== Release history ==
Region	Date	Label	Format	Catalog
United States	1992	Perishable	CD	
United States	2015	Jealous Butcher	LP	JB127
