= Joe Adamik =

American musician

- Born: 1972 (age 53–54)
- Genres: Jazz; Alternative
- Occupations: musician, songwriter, record producer
- Instruments: drummer, multi-instrumentalist
- Years active: 1990–present
- Formerly of: Califone
- Website: josephadamik.com

Joseph Adamik (born 1972 in Chicago, IL) is a musician and composer best known for his involvement with the bands Califone and Iron & Wine. He has also performed since the early 1990s with many Chicago jazz musicians as well as recording and performing with many other groups across different genres.

== With Califone ==
Adamik joined Califone after the debut album Roomsound in 2000, playing many instruments on Quicksand/Cradlesnakes and went on to be a foundational member until 2013. Masserella and Adamik created a unique melodic approach with traditional drums and found objects such as chunks of metal.

== With Iron & Wine ==
In 2010, after recording on the Iron & Wine album, Kiss Each Other Clean, Adamik joined Iron & Wine and performed and recorded with the band till 2018.

== Jazz ==
Joe has performed at the Hungry Brain, Beat Kitchen, Old Town School of Folk Music, and Constellation.

== Other work ==
Adamik has also performed from a young age with many jazz artists, most notably as a member of pianist Bob Dogan's trio and quintet. He is also a rotating member of the experimental group, Extraordinary Popular Delusions. He also leads his own solo projects as well as the group Madness of Crowds (with Jim Baker and Brian Sandstrom from Extraordinary Popular Delusions) and the duo with former Califone bandmate, Jim Becker, entitled Lanzon.

== Education ==
Attending Glenbard South High School in Glen Ellen, IL, Adamik went on to study music at Roosevelt University's Chicago Musical College, leaving to pursue full time music employment, but finishing his music degree from Northeastern Illinois University in 2019. He also has a degree in economics from Northeastern Illinois University.

== Discography ==
=== Solo recordings ===
- Super Low (2014)

=== Group recordings ===
==== Califone ====
- Deceleration One (2002)
- Quicksand/Cradlesnakes (2003)
- Deceleration Two (2003)
- Heron King Blues (2004)
- Roots & Crowns (2006)
- All My Friends Are Funeral Singers (2009))

==== Iron & Wine ====
- Kiss Each Other Clean (2010)
- Sing into My Mouth (2015) *(with Ben Bridwell)
- Beast Epic (2017)
- Weed Garden (2018)

==== Lanzon ====
- Lanzon (2020)

==== Margot & the Nuclear So and So's ====
- Buzzard (2010)

==== John Vanderslice ====
- The Cedars (2019)

==== Manishevitz ====
- City Life (2003)

==== The Singleman Affair ====
- Silhouettes At Dawn (2011)

==== The Fire Show ====
- Saint the Fire Show (2002)

==== Flecton Big Sky ====
- The Bright Side of Dying (2008)

==== Orso ====
- Ask Your Neighbor (2008)

==== Terra Naomi ====
- Secret Songs (2018)

==== Madness of Crowds ====
- Tulips (2019)

==== Peabody & Sherman ====
- Gasoline Rainbows (2019)

==== Adam Busch ====
- River of Bricks (2015)

==== Light Industry ====
- Light Industry (2016)

==== for Standard Recording Company ====
- Of Great and Mortal Men: 43 Songs for 43 U.S. Presidencies (2008)

==== Denty/Westlake ====
- Etched (2003)
