= Bunny Gets Paid =

Studio album by Red Red Meat
- Released: October 10, 1995
- Studio: Idful, Chicago, Illinois
- Genre: Indie rock, blues rock, psychedelic folk
- Length: 49:27
- Label: Sub Pop
- Producer: Brad Wood

Red Red Meat chronology
Jimmywine Majestic (1994)	Bunny Gets Paid (1995)	There's a Star Above the Manger Tonight (1997)

Professional ratings
Review scores
Source	Rating
AllMusic	3.5/5 stars
Pitchfork Media	8.9/10

Bunny Gets Paid is the third studio album by Red Red Meat, released in 1995 by Sub Pop. The band supported the album by touring with the Grifters.

== Critical reception ==
The St. Louis Post-Dispatch called the album "a muddy, perilous trek through a swamp of towering power chords, tangled acoustic guitars and slithering bass lines." The Austin American-Statesman praised the "unique slide-guitar techniques and clever, moody songs." The Chicago Tribune noted the "chamber-rock mystical" qualities of the album, as well as "the friends-in-a-room vibe." The Philadelphia Inquirer deemed it, "a mix of subtly charged blues and all-out garage rock."

== Track listing ==
All tracks are written by Red Red Meat.

No.	Title	Length
1.	"Carpet of Horses"	6:19
2.	"Chain Chain Chain"	3:44
3.	"Rosewood, Wax, Voltz + Glitter"	4:36
4.	"Buttered"	3:27
5.	"Gauze"	4:50
6.	"Idiot Son"	4:18
7.	"Variations on Nadia's Theme"	5:31
8.	"Oxtail"	5:07
9.	"Sad Cadillac"	5:19
10.	"Taxidermy Blues in Reverse"	4:19
11.	"There's Always Tomorrow"	1:57

Vinyl Reissue Jealous Butcher Bonus Tracks Cat. No. JB117 also on the Sub Pop bonus disk

No.	Title	Length
12.	"Mouse-ish (Dub Mix)"
13.	"Gun"
14.	"Words"
15.	"Chain Chain Chain (4-track Demo)"
16.	"Idiot Son (Cleversley Version)"
17.	"Carpet Of Horses (Cleversley Version)"
18.	"Saint Anthony's Jawbone"
19.	"Wishing (If I Had A Photograph Of You)"

== Personnel ==
Adapted from the Bunny Gets Paid liner notes.

Red Red Meat

- Brian Deck – piano, drums, vocals, musical direction, arrangements, mixing
- Tim Hurley – bass guitar, guitar, piano, vocals
- Ben Massarella – drums
- Tim Rutili – guitar, violin, piano, vocals

Additional musicians

- Russ Bassman – Moog synthesizer, organ
- Julie Pomerleau – violin
- Neil Rosario – guitar

Production and additional personnel

- Keith Cleversley – engineering, mixing
- Marty Perez – photography
- Casey Rice – engineering, mixing, synthesizer
- Brad Wood – production, engineering, mixing, synthesizer, piano

== Release history ==
Region	Date	Label	Format	Catalog
United States	1995	Sub Pop	CD, LP	SP 318
United States	2015	Jealous Butcher	LP	JB117
