= Echolocation (album) =

Studio album by Fruit Bats
- Released: 17 September 2001
- Recorded: Clava Studios, Chicago, Illinois
- Genre: Folk-rock
- Length: 50:05
- Label: Perishable Records
- Producer: Brian Deck

Fruit Bats chronology
Echolocation (2001)	Mouthfuls (2003)

Echolocation is the debut album by American folk-rock band Fruit Bats, released in 2001.

Professional ratings
Review scores
Source	Rating
AllMusic	2.5/5 stars
Pitchfork Media	5.9/10

== Track listing ==
All songs by Eric D. Johnson.

1. "The Old Black Hole" – 5:04
2. "Glass in Your Feet" – 3:52
3. "Buffalo and Deer" – 5:14
4. "Need It Just a Little" – 4:57
5. "Black Bells (Make Me Ok)" – 4:28
6. "Strange Little Neck of the Woods" – 3:51
7. "Echolocation Stomp" – 0:47
8. "Coal Age" – 2:24
9. "Filthy Water" – 5:07
10. "A Dodo Egg" – 5:37
11. "Dragon Ships" – 5:51
12. "Blue Parachute" – 2:46
