= There's a Star Above the Manger Tonight =

Studio album by Red Red Meat
- Released: February 25, 1997
- Recorded: BJ's Truck Stop, Chicago, Il
- Genre: Alternative, blues rock
- Length: 55:26
- Label: Sub Pop
- Producer: Red Red Meat

Red Red Meat chronology
Bunny Gets Paid (1995)	There's a Star Above the Manger Tonight (1997)

Professional ratings
Review scores
Source	Rating
AllMusic	4/5 stars
Alternative Press	4/5 stars
Pitchfork Media	8.0/10

There's a Star Above the Manger Tonight is the fourth and final studio album by Red Red Meat, released in 1997 by Sub Pop.

== Track listing ==
All tracks are written by Red Red Meat.

No.	Title	Length
1.	"Sulfur"	6:30
2.	"There's a Star Above the Manger Tonight"	2:14
3.	"Chinese Balls"	3:30
4.	"Second Hand Sea"	3:02
5.	"All Tied"	3:06
6.	"Paul Pachal"	7:01
7.	"Bury Me"	1:33
8.	"Airstream Driver"	5:10
9.	"Mecanix (From Cold Milk)"	1:20
10.	"Quarter Horses (B-Slow)"	4:45
11.	"Just Like an Egg on Stilts"	17:15

Vinyl Reissue Jealous Butcher Bonus Tracks Cat. No. JB114 RELEASE DATE 10/21/2014

No.	Title	Length
12.	"Pachal Revisited"
13.	"Welcome Christmas"
14.	"Tin Hands & Lazy Motors"
15.	"Milk For The Mechanics"
16.	"Snow Shoe Waltz"
17.	"Steal Away"

== Personnel ==
Adapted from the There's a Star Above the Manger Tonight liner notes.

Red Red Meat

- Brian Deck – synthesizer, drums, percussion, vocals, engineering, mixing
- Tim Hurley – bass guitar, lap steel guitar, synthesizer, berimbau, vocals
- Ben Massarella – drums
- Tim Rutili – guitar, mandolin, violin, piano, vocals, art direction

Additional musicians

- Jeremy Jacobsen – marimba, organ
- Matt Fields – vocals
- Casey Rice – effects
- Rick Rizzo – guitar

Production and additional personnel

- Jeff Kleinsmith – design
- Red Red Meat – production

== Release history ==
Region	Date	Label	Format	Catalog
United States	1997	Sub Pop	CD, LP	SP 387
United States	2014	Jealous Butcher	LP	JB114
