= Jimmywine Majestic =

Studio album by Red Red Meat
- Released: 1994
- Recorded: Idful, Chicago, Illinois
- Genre: Indie rock, blues rock
- Length: 56:22
- Label: Sub Pop
- Producer: Brad Wood

Red Red Meat chronology
Red Red Meat (1992)	Jimmywine Majestic (1994)	Bunny Gets Paid (1995)

Professional ratings
Review scores
Source	Rating
AllMusic	4/5 stars
The Encyclopedia of Popular Music	4/5 stars

Jimmywine Majestic is the second studio album by Red Red Meat, released in 1994 by Sub Pop.

== Production ==
The album was recorded at Idful Studios, Chicago, and was produced by Brad Wood and Casey Rice.

== Critical reception ==
Trouser Press wrote that the album "opens with a gnarled Stones riff (in the seething 'Flank'), dragging the listener on a trip that takes in all the usually hidden scenery the wrong side of the psychic tracks have to offer." The Chicago Reader called Jimmywine Majestic "a dazzlingly consistent, groove-heavy album." The Chicago Tribune called it "among the best albums of its era." The Washington Post wrote: "Woozy and slippery, the songs on the Meat's Jimmywine Majestic marry slide guitar and feedback, recalling the Stones at their bluesiest and most dissolute."

== Track listing ==
No.	Title	Writer(s)	Length
1.	"Flank"	Tim Rutili	4:39
2.	"Stained & Lit"	Tim Rutili	5:00
3.	"Braindead"	Tim Rutili	5:13
4.	"Smokey Mountain Dbl Dip"	Glenn Girard, Tim Rutili	3:30
5.	"Moon Calf Tripe"	Brian Deck, Glenn Girard, Tim Hurley, Tim Rutili	6:45
6.	"Cillamange"	Tim Rutili	2:42
7.	"Ball"	Brian Deck, Glenn Girard, Tim Rutili	4:46
8.	"Lather"	Tim Rutili	3:01
9.	"Rusted Water"	Brian Deck, Glenn Girard, Tim Hurley, Tim Rutili	3:30
10.	"Gorshin"	Tim Rutili	4:44
11.	"Dowser"	Tim Rutili	3:27
12.	"Comes"	Tim Rutili	2:58
13.	"Roses"	Brian Deck, Glenn Girard, Tim Rutili	6:07

Vinyl Reissue Jealous Butcher Bonus Tracks Cat. No. JB125 RELEASE DATE 11/06/2015

No.	Title	Length
14.	"make you gone"
15.	"pity"
16.	"lather (acme sessions)"
17.	"intro (single version)"

== Personnel ==
Adapted from the Jimmywine Majestic liner notes.

Red Red Meat

- Brian Deck – drums, Hammond organ
- Glenn Girard – lap steel guitar, vocals
- Tim Hurley – bass guitar, vocals
- Tim Rutili – guitar, vocals

Additional musicians

- C.J. Bani – organ (13)
- Dan McDermott – percussion (9)

Production and additional personnel

- Brad Wood – recording

== Release history ==
Region	Date	Label	Format	Catalog
United States	1994	Sub Pop	CD, CS, LP	SP 243
United States	2015	Jealous Butcher	LP	JB125
