= Califone =

Experimental rock band based in Chicago

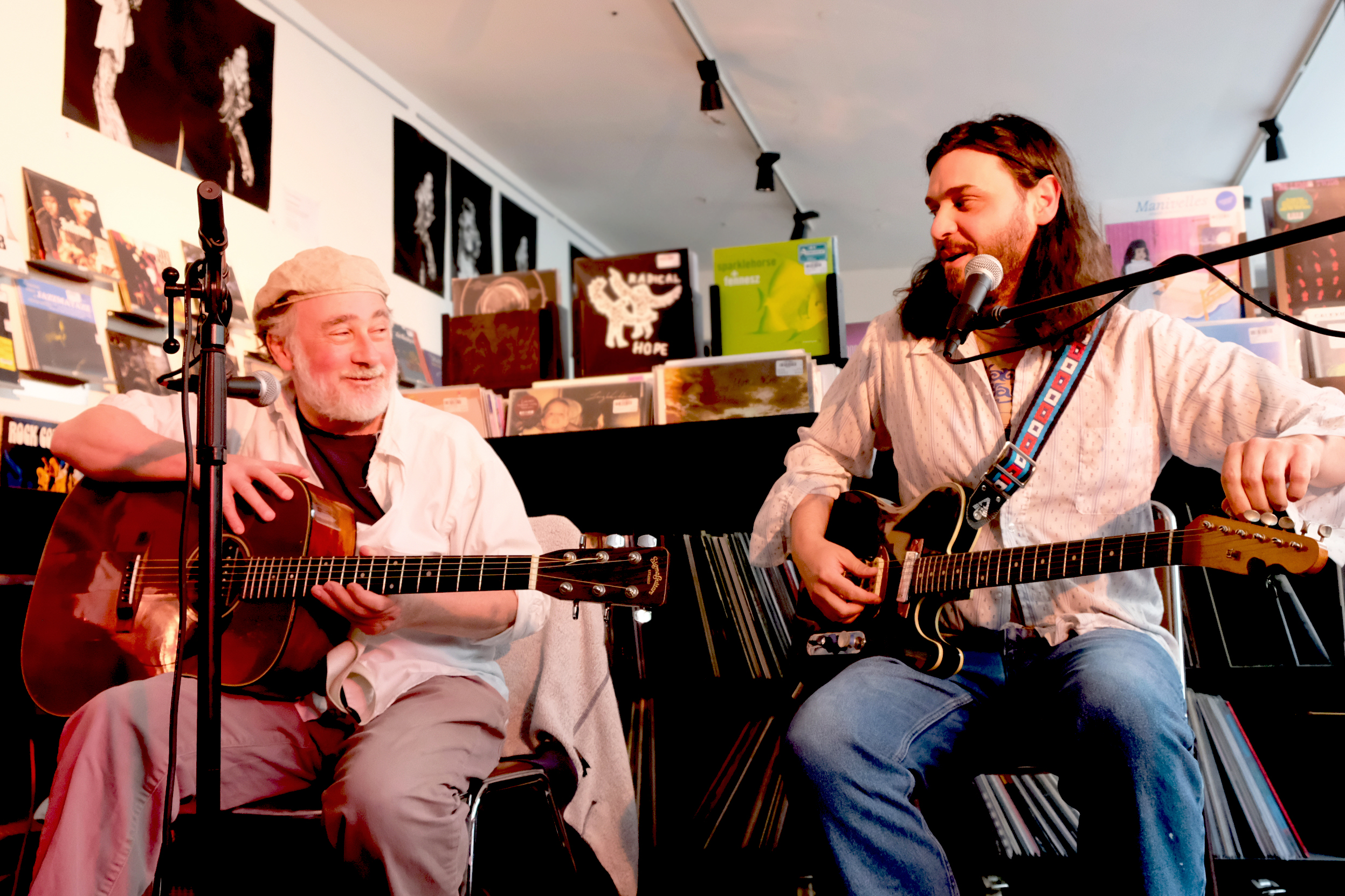
- Califone primaries Tim Rutili and Max Knouse at a 2026 performance.

Background information
- Origin: Chicago, Illinois, United States
- Genres: Indie rock, post-rock, experimental rock
- Years active: 1997–present
- Labels: Flydaddy Records, Road Cone Records, Perishable Records, Thrill Jockey, Dead Oceans
- Members: Tim Rutili; Rachel Blumberg; Max Knouse; Bradley Dujmovic; Ben Massarella; Joe Westerland
- Past members: Joe Adamik; Jim Becker; Wil Hendricks; Brian Deck; Eric D. Johnson

Califone is an experimental rock band from Chicago. The band is named after Califone International, an audio equipment manufacturer. Their work has been critically acclaimed.

Califone has released an album and feature film, both of which are titled All My Friends Are Funeral Singers. The album was released October 6, 2009 on Dead Oceans. The feature film was made available in 2010, and the band toured as a live soundtrack to the film.

All My Friends Are Funeral Singers is the follow-up album to 2006's Roots & Crowns, which The New York Times called "enthralling."

In 2011, a feature-length tour documentary about Califone, called "Made a Machine by Describing the Landscape", was released by IndiePix. The film was directed by Solan Jensen and Joshua Marie Wilkinson, and presents an intimate portrait of the band on tour in Europe and the US after the release of "Heron King Blues".

== History ==
After the breakup of his former band Red Red Meat, frontman Tim Rutili formed Califone as a solo project. Rutili's solo effort soon became a full-fledged musical project with a regular and rotating list of contributors, including many former members of Red Red Meat and some members of other Chicago bands.

According to Rutili, Califone started as a home project: "The statement of intent would have been 'easy listening' compared to what we were doing with Red Red Meat. This was supposed to be making little pop songs out of found pieces. It was supposed to be just a little home project, and it slowly grew from there. Now it seems like just about anything goes."

Califone's sound is a combination of Red Red Meat's blues-rock and experimental music, with inspiration drawn from early American folk music, pop, as well as electronic and groups like Psychic TV. Listeners familiar with Red Red Meat can quickly tell that Califone is not an attempt to revive the old band; elements from a number of musical styles contribute to their distinctive sound.

Their single "Funeral Singers" appears on the soundtrack of the video game Watch Dogs.

In 2019, Califone undertook a tour of house concerts and other small venues. The lineup consisted of Rutili, Massarella, and second percussionist Rachel Blumberg.

== Concepts ==
Many of Califone's albums are individually thematic, sometimes inspired by stories (All My Friends Are Funeral Singers), dreams (Heron King Blues), and silent era films (Deceleration albums).

=== All My Friends Are Funeral Singers ===
The album's companion film is about a psychic woman who lives alone in the woods. According to Rutili, who wrote the screenplay and directed the film,

She lives in a house full of ghosts, and one day, the ghosts realize they’re trapped, and she has to find a way–even though she doesn’t want them to go–to get them out of the house. Then they start destroying her life.

=== Heron King Blues ===
Califone's 2004 release Heron King Blues is a concept album involving a recurring dream:

Rutili has had a recurring dream since his youth, involving a giant man-bird creature, and then he discovered that the creature was actually a representation of an ancient Druid god called the heron king, which the British feared so deeply that they fled the battlefield when an effigy of the heron king was hoisted above the heads of the opposing army, and that Rutili realized that he had somehow been manifesting an image of this long-dead god figure in his head since he was a child.

=== Deceleration series ===
Califone has released instrumental albums that were recorded while the band played live soundtracks for films recorded in the 2000s. Deceleration 1 and Deceleration 2 were released in 2002 and 2003, respectively. Decelerations 3 and 4 are rumored to be released sometime in the future.

== Collaborations ==
In 1997, members of Red Red Meat collaborated with members of oRSo and Rex to record as Loftus for Perishable Records.

In 2002, Tim Rutili and Ben Massarella collaborated with Modest Mouse frontman Isaac Brock and others to release the album Sharpen Your Teeth under the band name Ugly Casanova.

In 2003, Tim Rutili, Ben Massarella and Jim Becker collaborated with Ottawa musician Miche Jetté, to record five of his songs for an independent mini-disc. This recording would later be released properly in 2005 as the first side of Jette's debut solo album (under his stage name Flecton), for the Canadian label, Kelp Records. The latter half of Flecton's Never Took a Wife was recorded with Memphis indie rockers, the Grifters.

In 2005, Califone collaborated with Freakwater as a backing band to record the album Thinking of You.

In 2006, Tim Rutili teamed up with Wil Hendricks and Michael Krassner under the name The Unseen Hand to record the soundtrack for Rank, a documentary about bullriding.

In 2006, Califone teamed up with animator/musician Brent Green on a series of performance art pieces featuring animation, live music, and spoken word. That same year, they were featured on the soundtrack for the movie Stranger than Fiction.

In December 2008, the Canadian band Flecton released The Bright Side of Dying, with Califone as the backing band. The album was recorded in Chicago and features Ben Massarella, Tim Rutili, Joe Adamik, and Jim Becker. The eight song vinyl LP (including a cover of Merle Haggard's "Workin' Man Blues") was released on Ottawa's Kelp Records.

Members of Califone made significant contributions to The Fruit Bats' 2009 album The Ruminant Band. Tim Rutili contributed vocals to the title song on the album, and Jim Becker provided vocals on the songs "Feather Bed" and "Flamingo", and guitar and fiddle on the songs "Tegucigalpa" and "Feather Bed". Members of Califone have also contributed to past Fruit Bats albums.

Members of Califone helped record Iron and Wine's 2011 album, Kiss Each Other Clean.

== Discography ==
- Califone (Flydaddy Records, 1998)
- Califone (Road Cone Records, 2000)
- Roomsound (Perishable Records, 2001; reissue with extra tracks, Dead Oceans, 2016)
- Sometimes Good Weather Follows Bad People (Perishable Records / Road Cone Records, 2002)
- Deceleration One (Perishable Records, 2002)
- Quicksand / Cradlesnakes (Thrill Jockey, 2003)
- Deceleration Two (Perishable Records, 2003)
- Heron King Blues (Thrill Jockey, 2004)
- Everybody's Mother Vol. 1 (Roots Crown Arts, 2005)
- Roots & Crowns (Thrill Jockey, October 10, 2006)
- All My Friends Are Funeral Singers (Dead Oceans, October 6, 2009)
- Sometimes Good Weather Follows Bad People (Jealous Butcher Records, 2012)
- Stitches (Dead Oceans, September 3, 2013)
- Insect Courage EP (Future Oak Records, March 21, 2016)
- Guitars Tuned to Air Conditioners (Jealous Butcher Records, July 22, 2016)
- Echo Mine (Jealous Butcher Records, 2020)
- Villagers (Jealous Butcher Records, 2023)
- The Villager's Companion (Jealous Butcher Records, 2025)
