= Tape Club =

Compilation album by Someone Still Loves You Boris Yeltsin
- Released: October 18, 2011
- Recorded: Winter 2002 through 2011
- Genre: Indie pop
- Length: 69:50
- Label: Polyvinyl; PRC-128
- Producer: SSLYBY

Someone Still Loves You Boris Yeltsin chronology
Let It Sway (2010)	Tape Club (2011)	Fly by Wire (2013)

Tape Club is a 26-song compilation of unreleased songs, B-sides, and demos from American indie pop/rock band Someone Still Loves You Boris Yeltsin. It was released in the United States in 2011.

== Track listing ==
No.	Title	Length
1.	"The Clod and the Pebble" (Cardwell and William Blake)	2:52
2.	"Let's Get Tired" (Dickey and Cardwell)	2:14
3.	"What'll We Do (demo)" (Dickey and Cardwell)	2:02
4.	"Song W + Song L" (Dickey)	3:16
5.	"Sweet Owl" (Dickey)	2:25
6.	"Spinning Sea" (Dickey)	1:19
7.	"Tin Floor 51" (Dickey)	2:11
8.	"Lower the Gas Prices, Howard Johnson" (Dickey)	2:58
9.	"Go Upstairs" (Dickey and Knauer)	2:10
10.	"Bigger Than Yr Yard" (Dickey and Knauer)	2:37
11.	"Half-Awake (Deb)" (Cardwell and Dickey)	2:17
12.	"Not Worth Fighting" (Dickey, Cardwell, and Knauer)	3:02
13.	"New Day" (Cardwell)	3:42
14.	"Coming Through" (Cardwell)	4:49
15.	"Dead Right (Wilmington demo)" (Dickey)	2:08
16.	"We Can Win Missouri" (Dickey and Cardwell)	2:45
17.	"Same Speed" (Dickey)	2:06
18.	"Cardinal Rules" (Dickey)	2:20
19.	"Chili Cook-Off" (Dickey)	3:01
20.	"Song 1000" (Knauer and Dickey)	1:34
21.	"Phantomwise (demo)" (Dickey and Lewis Carroll)	1:08
22.	"Back in the Saddle (demo)" (Dickey)	2:28
23.	"Yellow Missing Signs" (Dickey)	2:37
24.	"Letter Divine" (Cardwell)	3:42
25.	"Bended" (Cardwell)	4:57
26.	"Bastard of Rome" (Cardwell and Dickey)	3:10

== Personnel ==
John Robert Cardwell, Philip Dickey, Jonathan James, Will Knauer

=== Additional musicians ===
2 = Additional guitar and bass by Chris Slater and Tom Hembree.
3 = Additional vocals by Gwyn Knauer.
5, 19 = Clarinet by Roni Dickey.
10 = Additional vocals by Grace Bentley.
18 = Additional shouting by Cindy Woolf, Matt Greene, Roni Dickey, Grace Bentley, Michael St. John, and Ryan Spilken.

== Recording and production ==
All recorded by SSLYBY in Springfield, Missouri except where noted. Mastered by Jonathan James at a Motel 6.
1 = Phil's mom's house, winter 2002.
2, 4 = Sean Schultz's basement, winter 2003.
3 = Weller house, winter 2003.
5 = Fremont house, summer 2005.
6, 8 = Jonathan's studio/practice space, summer 2005.
7 = Lotus Rain's house, summer 2005.
9, 10 = Weller attic, summer 2005.
11, 12 = Jonathan's studio/practice space, winter 2007.
13 = Bentley's carriage house, fall 2007.
14 = Jonathan's studio/practice space, fall 2007.
15 = Fred Champion's loft in Wilmington, North Carolina, winter 2007.
16 = The Studio, spring 2008. Recorded by Lou Whitney and Eric Schuchmann.
17 = Phil's apartment, spring 2008.
18 = Mayor of Springfield's yoga studio/basement, summer 2009.
19, 20 = Will's house on Normal Street, summer 2009.
21, 22 = Phil's basement, summer 2009.
23 = Phil's room and Jonathan's apartment, summer 2009.
24, 26 = Smart Studios in Madison, Wisconsin, fall 2009. Recorded by Chris Walla and Beau Sorenson.
25 = Dark Egg studio, fall 2009.

== Album art ==
Photos and art by Daniel Zender, Zoe Burnett, Gabriella Lacza, Abby Williamson, Tracy Graham, Jason Williamson, Tim Nowack, and Chris Beckman. Art direction by Chris Beckman.
