= Manishevitz =

- Origin: Virginia
- Genre: Indie rock
- Years active: 1999–2007
- Label: Jagjaguwar Records

Manishevitz is an American indie rock band originally from Virginia and later based in Chicago. They released material on Jagjaguwar Records and Catbird Records.

== History ==
Manishevitz was formed by Adam Busch (ex-The Curious Digit) in Virginia in the late 1990s. Their debut album was released on Jagjaguwar Records in 1999, and after this Busch and guitarist Via Nuon moved to Chicago. Their sophomore LP, Rollover, released in 2000, featured Chicago musicians Ryan Hembrey, Nate Lepine, Joe Adamik of Califone, and Fred Longberg-Holm. Their 2002 EP Private Lines features a cover of the Roxy Music song "2HB". In 2003, their third full-length, City Life, was issued on Jagjaguwar, and in 2007, East to East followed on Catbird.

== Discography ==
- The Grammar Bell and the All Fall Down (Jagjaguwar Records, 1999)
- Rollover (Jagjaguwar, 2000)
- Private Lines EP (Jagjaguwar, 2002)
- City Life (Jagjaguwar, 2003)
- East to East (Catbird Records, 2007)
