= Fruit Bats (band) =

American indie rock band

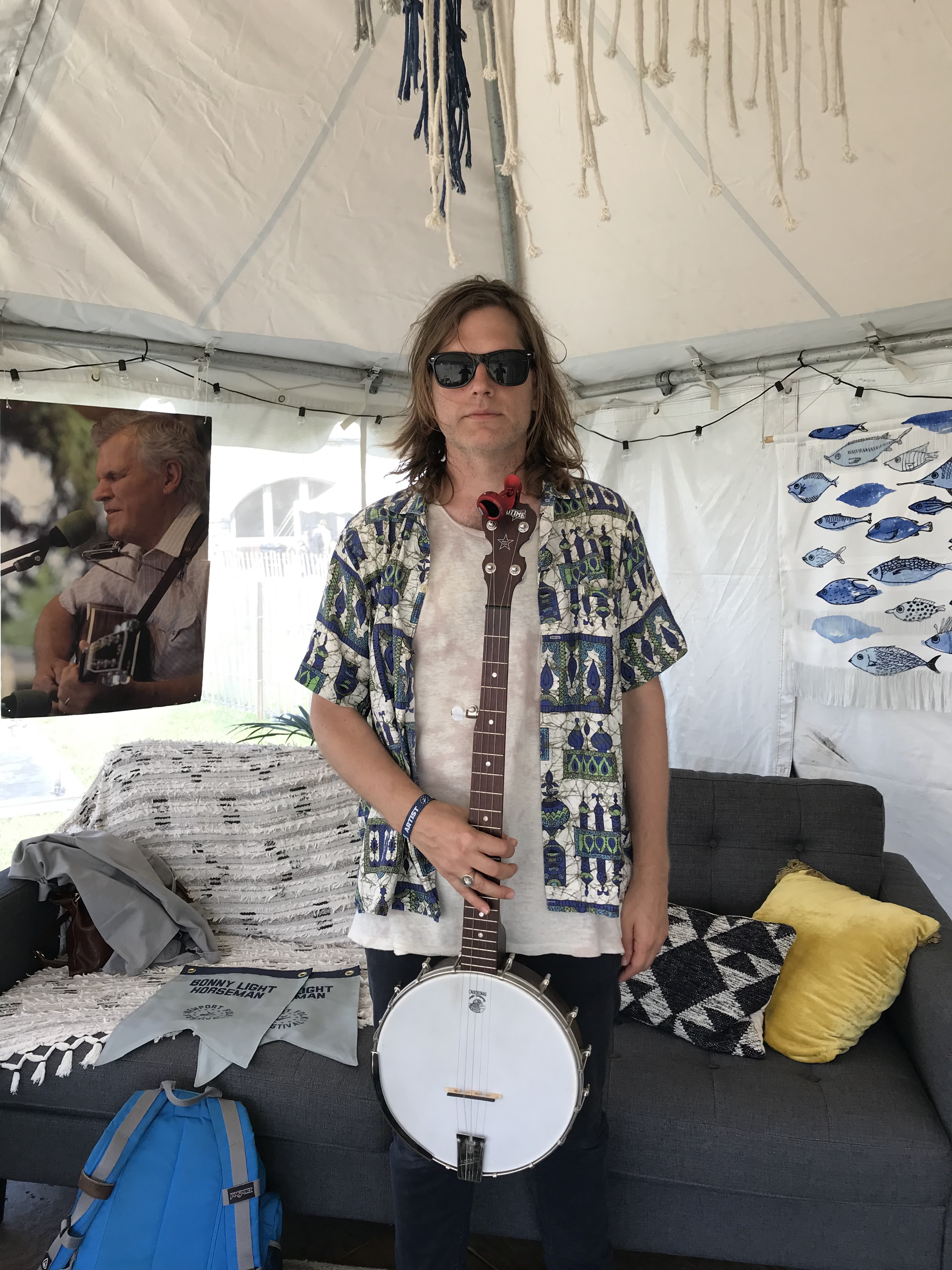

Background information
- Origin: Chicago, Illinois, United States
- Genres: Folk rock, indie folk, alternative country
- Years active: 1997–2013, 2015–present
- Labels: Merge Records, Easy Sound Recording Company, Sub Pop, Perishable Records
- Members: Eric D. Johnson
- Website: www.fruitbatsmusic.com

Fruit Bats is an American indie rock band formed in 1997 in Chicago, Illinois, as the project of singer and songwriter Eric D. Johnson. Johnson is the band's sole permanent member, with various musicians joining the band in live and studio settings.

== History ==
=== Early years and Echolocation ===
In the late 1990s and early 2000s, Johnson was teaching guitar and banjo at Chicago's Old Town School of Folk Music, and fronting an indie rock band called I Rowboat. In early 2000, he joined the experimental folk group Califone as a multi-instrumentalist. He had also been making homemade cassettes since 1997 under the name Fruit Bats. He describes coming up with the band name as a joke of sorts, describing it as "this dumb fake punk rock name that I put on a four-track tape."

The members of Califone ran a small record label called Perishable, and after hearing some of the Fruit Bats recordings, agreed to release a full length album. The subsequent album, Echolocation, was produced by Brian Deck and released in the fall of 2001. Fruit Bats made their live debut at Chicago's Empty Bottle in March 2001. They went on to tour frequently in 2001 and 2002, often as a support act for such bands as The Sadies, Gorky's Zygotic Mynci, Modest Mouse and The Shins.

=== Sub Pop years ===
In 2002, Fruit Bats signed with Sub Pop Records. It was through friendships Johnson had developed with members of Modest Mouse and The Shins that he was able to get an introduction with the label. Fruit Bats' Sub Pop debut, Mouthfuls, was released in April 2003. The band continued to tour regularly, traveling with label-mates Iron and Wine and Holopaw, as well as playing some headlining dates. That album cycle also saw the band make their major festival debut at Washington state's Sasquatch! Music Festival in 2004. Mouthfuls’ closing track "When U Love Somebody," of which Johnson has said "I wrote it in the time it takes to sing it" has become a signature song for the band. It was featured in the film Youth in Revolt, and has been covered by bands such as The Decemberists, Guster and Said the Whale.

In 2005, Fruit Bats released their second album for Sub Pop, Spelled in Bones. That same year they made their network television debut on Last Call with Carson Daly. They also embarked on a co-headline tour with label-mates Rogue Wave, and supported acts such as Son Volt, Ray Lamontagne, and Guster, and also appeared for a performance at Sundance Film Festival.

Johnson became a member of The Shins in late 2006 and toured with that band until 2010. He has described his time in that band as "a total game changer" and influential on Fruit Bats' work creatively and professionally.

In 2009, after a three-year break while Johnson toured with The Shins, Fruit Bats released the album The Ruminant Band. This album marked a sonic departure for the band, with a ragged, guitar heavy folk-rock sound. Johnson described this album "a better use of my influences" and has also stated the album was a creative and stylistic watershed for him. The album was also something of a critical breakthrough for Fruit Bats, getting positive reviews from Pitchfork, The A.V. Club and Robert Christgau. The band also made another TV appearance, this time on The Late Late Show with Craig Ferguson. It was also on this album cycle that the band made the first of many appearances at Portland's Pickathon Music Festival.

Fruit Bats' final album for Sub Pop, Tripper, came out in August 2011. It was the first of several releases by the band produced by Thom Monahan. It featured appearances by J. Mascis, Neal Casal and Richard Swift, and made it to the top 15 of the Billboard Heatseekers chart, the first Fruit Bats record to make that list. The album's single "You’re Too Weird" is often remembered for its very 1980s music video, in which Johnson plays a heavily styled version of himself. Tripper's subsequent tours would see Fruit Bats make appearances at Bonnaroo and The Dave Matthews Band Caravan.

Fruit Bats were featured on the 2011 soundtrack for the Jesse Peretz film Our Idiot Brother, starring Paul Rudd. Johnson served as the soundtrack's producer, and also composed the score for the film.

In November 2013, Johnson announced he would be dissolving the Fruit Bats. That month they played what was to be their farewell show at a sold out Aladdin Theatre in Portland, Oregon. The following year Johnson released an album under the name EDJ, which he has subsequently described as "essentially a Fruit Bats album."

=== Reformation 2015–2018 ===
Johnson had described the retirement of the Fruit Bats name as "a career-stalling move" and in 2015 announced on Instagram that he was reviving the band, declaring "I miss these old songs" via a handwritten letter. That same year My Morning Jacket had invited Johnson's EDJ project to open several tour dates. Johnson instead asked if he could bring the reformed Fruit Bats instead. The tour was a major breakthrough for the band as a live act.

In 2016, Fruit Bats released their sixth official full-length LP, Absolute Loser, via newly formed Los Angeles–based label Easy Sound. It was the band's first release in five years. The album featured the single "Humbug Mountain Song," which has garnered over fifty-nine million streams on Spotify. The accompanying comedic music video for that song featured Johnson as a modern-day frontiersman fighting a bear. The band's tours on the album featured performances at Nelsonville Music Festival, Green Man Festival, Newport Folk Festival, and Pickathon. Absolute Loser was voted as one of the best albums of 2016 by Paste magazine.

=== Merge Records and breakthrough ===
Fruit Bats signed to North Carolina–based independent label Merge Records in 2018.

Also in 2018, Johnson formed the folk group Bonny Light Horseman with Josh Kaufman and Anais Mitchell. Their subsequent debut album was nominated for two Grammy Awards.

In 2019, Fruit Bats' Merge debut Gold Past Life was released. It charted on Billboard's Heatseeker and Independent album charts. It features several songs which have become streaming hits and fan favorites, including "The Bottom of It," "A Lingering Love," and "Cazadera." It was the last appearance on a Fruit Bats record by Neal Casal before his death. Of the album, Variety magazine said, "there won’t be many albums in 2019 with as many quotable, cut-to-the-marrow lines as this one has." Gold Past Life was voted the seventh best album of 2019 by No Depression magazine.

In 2020, Fruit Bats released a full-album cover of The Smashing Pumpkins' 1993 record Siamese Dream. Johnson recorded the album at his home in Los Angeles, playing every instrument himself.

Fruit Bats' 2021 album The Pet Parade was produced by Johnson's Bonny Light Horseman bandmate Josh Kaufman and recorded remotely in different cities in the early days of the COVID-19 pandemic. The title of the album is a reference to an actual pet parade that Johnson used to attend as a child in La Grange, Illinois—and a metaphor for the "beauty and absurdity of existence." The album was nominated for Best Americana Album at the 2021 Libera Awards.

The video for The Pet Parade's single "The Balcony", which features a cast composed entirely of puppets, was co-directed by Johnson—his directorial debut—and his wife, Annie Beedy. The song was one of the most-played singles of 2021 on SiriusXMU radio, and that year Fruit Bats made their first network television appearance since 2009 performing it on Late Night with Seth Meyers.

Fruit Bats' double-disc, 20-year career retrospective Sometimes A Cloud Is Just a Cloud: Slow Growers, Sleeper Hits and Lost Songs was released in 2022. The first disc featured a curated assortment of popular songs from through the years, and the second was filled with B-sides, unreleased singles, and some of the early four track recordings from the 1990s. The collection's title comes from a lyric in the 2019 song "Cazadera".

Fruit Bats toured extensively in 2022 after the COVID-19 pandemic derailed plans for 2020 and 2021 dates. They kicked off the year of touring reuniting with My Morning Jacket at that band's One Big Holiday festival in Cancún, Mexico. That year also saw Fruit Bats embark on their first proper tour of the United Kingdom since 2011, including an appearance at End of the Road Festival.

"Humbug Mountain Song" was featured in an episode of Better Things in April 2022.

== Musical style and influences ==
Fruit Bats sound has changed over the years, ranging from lo-fi indie Americana on Echolocation to the often disco-influenced sounds of Gold Past Life.

Johnson has often cited Top 40 radio of the 1970s and 1980s as influences. Other professed early songwriting influences include The Velvet Underground, Uncle Tupelo, Big Star, the Beatles' White Album, Joni Mitchell, and Talk Talk. Johnson has described discovering the burgeoning mid-90s indie rock scene in his late teens, a discovery he would refer to as "the light at the end of the tunnel." He went on to say, "basically I kinda became a singer/songwriter right out of the gate, but not by choice. I was a Deadhead but not a good enough player to be in a jam band, and then indie rock came along and showed me that there were all kinds of possibilities, even if you couldn't shred." Johnson has spoken frequently of his love for Prince, whom he has referenced several times in his song lyrics.

Johnson is a longtime fan of The Grateful Dead. Fruit Bats have covered the songs "Wharf Rat" and "They Love Each Other" in concert. Johnson has appeared several times as a guest on several Grateful Dead related projects. In August 2019 he joined Joe Russo's Almost Dead for several songs at Los Angeles’ Greek Theatre, and once again with that band in July 2021 at their set at Westville Music Bowl in New Haven, Connecticut. In October 2021 he played three shows at the Capitol Theatre in Port Chester, New York, as part of Phil Lesh and Friends.

== Discography ==
=== Albums ===
Year	Title	Label
2001	Echolocation	Perishable Records
2003	Mouthfuls	Sub Pop
2005	Spelled in Bones	Sub Pop
2009	The Ruminant Band	Sub Pop
2011	Tripper	Sub Pop
2016	Absolute Loser	Easy Sound Recording Company
2019	Gold Past Life	Merge Records
2020	Siamese Dream	Turntable Kitchen/Merge Records
2021	The Pet Parade	Merge Records
2023	A River Running to Your Heart	Merge Records
2025	Baby Man	Merge Records
2026	The Landfill	Merge Records

=== Compilations and live albums ===
Year	Title	Label
2004	Tragedy Plus Time Equals Fruit Bats	St Ives
2016	The Glory of Fruit Bats	Easy Sound Recording Company
2016	Live at Pickathon	Easy Sound Recording Company
2019	In Real Life: Live at Spacebomb	Spacebomb
2020	Found a Round Stone: Live in Portland	Merge Records
2022	Sometimes a Cloud is Just a Cloud: Slow Growers, Sleeper Hits and Lost Songs (2001–2021)	Merge Records
2024	Starry-eyed, in Stereo	Merge Records
