= Catbird Records =

American independent record label

- Founded: 2005
- Founder: Ryan Catbird
- Genre: Indie rock
- Country of origin: U.S.
- Location: New York City
- Official website: www.catbirdrecords.com

Catbird Records is an independent record label formed in September 2005 in Columbus, Ohio. It is based in New York City. It was founded and is run by Ryan Catbird of music blog The Catbirdseat. The label is financed solely by advertising revenue generated by the blog.

== Discography ==
- CBR001 Someone Still Loves You Boris Yeltsin/Michael Holt - Someone Still Loves You Michael Holt: A Scrapbook For You
- CBR002 Pet Politics - In My Head
- CBR003 Hemstad - Hemstad
- CBR004 Get Him Eat Him - Do As I Tell You
- CBR005 Tap Tap - Lanzafame
- CBR006 Maestro Echoplex - Last Night I Saw God On The Dancefloor
- CBR007 Pet Politics - The Spring
- CBR008 Mathew Sawyer & The Ghosts - Blue Birds Blood
- CSP001 Fulton Lights - Fulton Lights (Limited Edition Version)
- CBR009 Forest Fire - Psychic Love Star
- CBR010 Moviola - Dead Knowledge
- CB7001 Get Him Eat Him - There's A Guy 7"
- CSP002 The Underpainting - The Underpainting (Limited Edition Version)
- CSP003 Jason Zumpano - In The Co. Of Ghosts: Music For Jason McLean
- CSP004 Prairie Cat - Attacks!
- CBR011 Clear Tigers - EP
- CBR012 Manishevitz - East To East
- CBR013 PWRFL Power - EP
- CBR014 Air Waves - EP
- CBR015 Forest Fire - Survival
- CSP005 Fulton Lights - The Way We Ride
- CSP006 Jason Zumpano - Roses $9.99 Dozen
- CBR016 George Washington Brown - EP
- CBR017 Apollo Ghosts - Forgotten Triangle
- CSP007 Apollo Ghosts - Hastings Sunrise

=== Co-Releases ===
In Catbird catalog numbering, 'CSP' ("Catbird Special Projects) denotes a special release of some kind, or a co-release with another label, typically wherein Catbird provides a limited special-edition version of an album with a larger-scale release. Co-releases:

- CSP001 Split release with Android Eats Records
- CSP002 Split release with Tower Of Song Records
- CSP004 Split release with Fuzzy Logic Recordings

=== Bonus items ===
Catbird Records offers limited bonus materials with many releases, including bonus discs, special packaging variations and the like:

- CBR001 Unique hand-painted covers
- CBR002 Various cover colors
- CBR003 First 200 copies included 5-song bonus disc, in unique sleeves handcrafted by Hemstad
- CBR004 Various cover colors, various insert variations
- CBR005 First 200 copies in hand-bound, cloth-covered book, with 3-song bonus disc
- CBR006 First 100 copies included 4-song bonus disc, Songs About Planes
- CBR007 Various cover colors, various insert stamps
- CBR008 First 200 copies included 3-song bonus disc
- CBR009 Various cover colors
- CBR010 200 copies included bonus DVD with videos, photos, and demos
- CSP003 3 prints of art by Jason McLean included, in varying colors
- CSP004 Unique hand-painted covers
- CBR012 First 100 copies included 4-song bonus disc, in hand-decorated sleeves
- CBR013 Various cover colors
- CBR015 Available in 'Giant Size' (12" x 12") edition
- CSP005 Variant white cover
- CSP006 Unique hand-colored covers
- CBR017 25 copies with variant photo/acetate cover

== T-shirts ==
Catbird Records has done several limited-edition T-shirt pressings.

- Logo Tee (Summer 2006) - Edition of 50. Colors: red, blue, green, brown, grey, black
- Tap Tap Elephant Tee - Edition of 50. Colors: navy
- Hemstad Tee - Edition of 15. Colors: pink
- Logo Tee (Fall 2006) - Edition of 50. Colors: brown
- Logo Tee (Summer 2007) - Edition of 50. Colors: green, purple, aqua, slate, black

== See also ==
- List of record labels
