= Joshua Marie Wilkinson =

American poet (born 1977)

Joshua Marie Wilkinson (born December 2, 1977) is an American poet, editor, publisher, and filmmaker.

== Life ==
He was born on December 2, 1977, and raised in Haller Lake neighborhood, Seattle, Washington. His given name is Joshua Wilson; his grandmother's name was Marie Wilkinson, after whom he writes and publishes. He earned degrees in Poetry (M.F.A., University of Arizona), Film (M.A., University College Dublin), and English (PhD, University of Denver). He has also edited five anthologies and directed a tour documentary of the band Califone with Solan Jensen released in 2011 by IndiePix.

His work appeared at PEN Poetry Series, Academy of American Poets, the Poetry Society of America, Boston Review, and Bomb. His writing has also been featured in many anthologies including both Postmodern American Poetry edited by Paul Hoover and Language Lessons: Vol. 1 from Jack White's Third Man Records, which was featured in Rolling Stone, Spin, The Guardian, and elsewhere.

He currently teaches creative writing at University of Arizona and is a founding editor of the online literary journal of poetry and poetics The Volta. and a founding editor of the small press Letter Machine Editions, which has been honored by the National Book Award Foundation.

He is married to the writer Lisa Wells.

== Selected works ==
=== Books ===
- The Courier's Archive & Hymnal, Sidebrow Books, 2013, ISBN 978-0981497594
- Swamp Isthmus, Black Ocean, 2013, ISBN 9781939568007
- Selenography, with Polaroids by Tim Rutili, Sidebrow Books, 2010, ISBN 9780981497525
- The Book of Whispering in the Projection Booth, Tupelo Press, 2009, ISBN 9781932195675
- Figures for a Darkroom Voice, (with Noah Eli Gordon) Tarpaulin Sky Press, 2007, ISBN 9780977901951
- Lug Your Careless Body Out of the Careful Dusk: A Poem in Fragments, University of Iowa Press, 2006, ISBN 978-1-58729-678-9
- Suspension of a Secret in Abandoned Rooms, Pinball Publishing, 2005, ISBN 9780972192644

=== Anthologies ===
- Anne Carson: Ecstatic Lyre, University of Michigan Press, 2015, ISBN 978-0-47205-253-0
- The Volta Book of Poets, Sidebrow Books, 2015, ISBN 978-1-94009-001-6
- The Force of What's Possible: Writers on Accessibility & the Avant-Garde, with Lily Hoang, Nightboat Books, 2015, ISBN 978-1-93765-827-4
- Poets on Teaching: A Sourcebook, University of Iowa Press, 2010, ISBN 978-1-58729-904-9
- 12x12: Conversations in 21st-Century Poetry and Poetics, with Christina Mengert, University of Iowa Press, 2009, ISBN 978-1-58729-791-5

=== Chapbooks ===
- A Little Slash at the Meadow, Above/Ground Press, 2013
- In the Trade of Alive Letters Mis-sent, Brave Men Press, 2011
- I go by Edgar Huntly now, DoubleCross Press, 2009
- Until the Lantern's Shaky Song: poems for my friends, Cinematheque Press, 2009
- Cold Faction, Further Adventures Press, 2009
- The Book of Flashlights, Clover, & Milk (Pilot Books, 2008)
- The Book of Truants & Projectorlight (Octopus Books, 2006)
- A Ghost as King of the Rabbits (New Michigan Press, 2005)

=== Films ===
- Made a Machine by Describing the Landscape: a film about Califone, co-directed by Solan Jensen (IndiePix Films, 2011)
