= Quicksand / Cradlesnakes =

Studio album by Califone
- Released: 2003
- Studios: Clava, Chicago
- Genres: Folk, electronic
- Label: Thrill Jockey

Califone chronology
Deceleration One (2002)	Quicksand / Cradlesnakes (2003)	Deceleration Two (2003)

Quicksand / Cradlesnakes is an album by the American band Califone, released in 2003. They supported it with a North American tour.

== Production ==
The album was recorded and mixed at Clava Studios, in Chicago, by Graeme Gibson. Jim Becker and Joe Adamik joined the band prior to the recording sessions. Frontman Tim Rutili told his bandmates that he had songs ready so that they could book studio time rather than wait until everything was written. His songwriting was influenced in part by his admiration for the Anthology of American Folk Music. The CD included a video file of Rutili's film Francis.

== Critical reception ==
Professional ratings
Review scores
Source	Rating
AllMusic	4.5/5 stars
Pitchfork	8.6/10
Spin	A−

The Chicago Tribune said that the album "stands as another compelling fusion of junkyard percussion and rustic guitar picking, electronic sound manipulation and gentle lullabylike melody." The Observer stated, "Tracks like 'Michigan Girls' are plucked and sparse, but thrum with texture. A strange and beguiling record." Spin likened the band to a "Midwestern Latin Playboys". The Toronto Star noted that the music often "bridges the sonic and temporal divide between an Alan Lomax field recording and the latest in digital experimentation."

The Washington Post labeled the songs "instant-antique laments in the manner of Will Oldham, but with saxophone bleats, electronic brays and the exotic timbres of ... homemade instruments". The Age concluded, "As neither folk recidivism nor ironic pastiche, their patchwork of rattling acoustic instrumentation can be construed as atavistic and anarchistic." AllMusic considered "Million Dollar Funeral" "possibly Rutili's finest stab at a postmodern folk song".

== Track listing ==
No.	Title	Length
1.	"One"
2.	"Horoscopic.Amputation.Honey"
3.	"Michigan Girls"
4.	"Cat Eats Coyote"
5.	"Your Golden Ass"
6.	"(Red)"
7.	"Million Dollar Funeral"
8.	"When Leon Spinx Moved into Town"
9.	"Mean Little Seed"
10.	"Vampiring Again"
11.	"Slower Twin"
12.	"Stepdaughter"
