= Ugly Casanova =

American indie rock band

- Origin: Issaquah, Washington
- Genres: Indie rock
- Years active: 1997–2002, 2010
- Label: Sub Pop
- Spinoff of: Modest Mouse
- Past members: Isaac Brock; Eric Judy; Tom Peloso; Joe Plummer; Clay Jones; Tim Rutili; Pall Jenkins; John Orth; Brian Deck; Steve Dukage; John Atkins; Tyler Reilly

Ugly Casanova was an American indie rock band formed by Modest Mouse frontman Isaac Brock in 1997. Ugly Casanova signed to Sub Pop Records. The band has released one album, Sharpen Your Teeth.

== Career ==
According to the Ugly Casanova website, in 1998 a man named Edgar E. Graham, a.k.a. "Ugly Casanova", impressed himself upon the band Modest Mouse while backstage at a concert in Denver, Colorado. After some prodding, he shared his work with the band and began performing it early before shows while some people were milling around. Upon completing these performances, he retreated quickly with a look of anger and shame. After a time, a few small recordings were created, after which Edgar vanished. Isaac Brock of Modest Mouse later recorded his songs in hopes that Graham would resurface in the music scene.

Brock has since revealed that Edgar Graham was "a fiction thing that [Brock] started awhile back to eliminate [himself] from the band," to escape having to do interviews. Two pieces of evidence exist that suggest that the story was fiction: Modest Mouse's 1997 EP The Fruit That Ate Itself was credited to having been under the production company Ugly Casanova, which suggested it was a name Brock made up to retain creative control and publishing rights to his music while under a major label. Secondly, "Ugly Casanova" was the title of a song Brock wrote around 1993.

The band lineup as of the 180° South: Conquerors of the Useless soundtrack consists of Brock, Eric Judy, Tom Peloso, and Joe Plummer of Modest Mouse, as well as Clay Jones, who worked as an engineer on Modest Mouse's fifth album, We Were Dead Before The Ship Even Sank. The band's lineup for Sharpen Your Teeth consisted of Brock, Tyler Reilly (In the Drink), Tim Rutili (Califone, Red Red Meat), Pall Jenkins (The Black Heart Procession), John Orth (Holopaw), and Brian Deck (Red Red Meat).

Compared with Modest Mouse's music, Ugly Casanova's music is distinguished by its more stripped-down sound. The lack of overdubbed vocals on some of the tracks is particularly significant: Brock is known for having a slight lisp which he is very uncomfortable with and has often covered up on Modest Mouse recordings via double tracking and distortion. Ugly Casanova mixes indie rock with hints of country and folk, ranging from acoustic ballads ("Hotcha Girls") to more bizarre with piercing vocals ("Diamonds on the Face of Evil").

Two tracks released by Ugly Casanova, "Baby's Clean Conscience" and "Parasites", appear earlier as unreleased demos of Modest Mouse in the Paracite Sessions purportedly recorded in 1993 at Calvin Johnson's Dub Narcotic Studio. In 1997 the fourth Magic Eye Single (each one named after its color of vinyl) included To Roads To Go on the apparently now defunct Magic Eye Records, however, this was an entirely different incarnation of Ugly Casanova consisting of Brock, Steve Dukage, and John Atkins of 764-Hero.

Rumors of new Ugly Casanova material came and went, but no substantial news regarding the band surfaced until it was announced that Ugly Casanova would contribute to the soundtrack for the 2010 documentary 180° South: Conquerors of the Useless. The soundtrack featured eight new Ugly Casanova songs as well as a redone version of "Hotcha Girls" from Sharpen Your Teeth. In 2025, Ugly Casanova was listed in the lineup announcement of Modest Mouse's 2026 cruise, "Ice Cream Floats," marking the band's first announcement of activity in 15 years.

== Discography ==
=== Studio albums ===
- Sharpen Your Teeth (Sub Pop Records, 2002)

=== Other releases ===
- Magic Eye Single No. 4: White (Magic Eye Records, 1997)
- Diggin Holes" b/w "Babys Clean Conscience (Sub Pop Records, 2002)
- 180° South: Conquerors of the Useless Soundtrack (Brushfire Records, 2010)
