= Orso (band) =

Orso (stylized as oRSo) is a US-based band formed in 1996 and led by Phil Spirito of Rex, HiM (US), Loftus, and Califone featuring Brian Deck of Red Red Meat and Ben Massarella of Califone. The musical style is self-described as "orchestrated folk weirdness"; their songs, which feature prominent banjo parts, also feature experimental sounds such as those made by typewriters and toilets. The band has released music on Perishable Records.

== Discography ==
- Orso (Perishable Records, 2000)
- Long Time By (Perishable Records, 2000)
- My Dreams are Back and They Are Better than Ever (Perishable Records, 2004)
- Roveretto (hinah, 2005)
- Is Xmas Tomorrow? EP (Binto Family, 2005)
- Ask Your Neighbor........... (Contraphonic, 2008)
