= Forest fire (disambiguation) =

A forest fire is an unplanned, uncontrolled and unpredictable fire in an area of combustible vegetation.

Forest Fire or Forest Fires may also refer to:

- Forest Fire (band), an experimental rock band from New York City
- Forest Fire (song), a 1984 song by Lloyd Cole and the Commotions
- Forest Fires (song), a 2014 song by Fred V & Grafix
