= Heron King Blues =

Studio album by Califone
- Released: 2004
- Genres: Country rock, experimental rock
- Label: Thrill Jockey

Califone chronology
Deceleration Two (2003)	Heron King Blues (2004)	Everybody's Mother Vol. 1 (2005)

Heron King Blues is an album by the American band Califone, released in 2004. It is in part a concept album about singer Tim Rutili's recurring bird dreams and ornithophobia. The band supported the album with UK and North American tours.

== Production ==
Rutili was backed on most of the tracks by percussionists Ben Massarella and Joe Adamik and multi-instrumentalist Jim Becker. Califone recorded the album in an improvisational manner, choosing to not start the sessions with existing songs or rehearsed structures. The band was inspired by Captain Beefheart's Mirror Man, which was allegedly recorded in a single night. Their initial plan was to record an EP that would give them a reason to tour. The foundations of the tracks were completed in three days in a studio on the south side of Chicago, with the band then adding lyrics and overdubs. They employed samples and looped beats on some of the tracks, and used steel guitar, bottles, and hand drums, among other instruments. The 15-minute title track, which was inspired by a Druid mythical character appropriated by the Romans, is mostly instrumental. "Trick Bird" was cowritten with members of the band Orso. The making of the album was somewhat tense; after the band also had equipment stolen during their tour, they decided to take a break.

== Critical reception ==
Professional ratings
Review scores
Source	Rating
AllMusic	4/5 stars
Creative Loafing	A−
The Gazette	4/5 stars
The Herald	3/5
Pitchfork	8.4/10 (Note: Pitchfork initially awarded this album its Best New Music designation, though this designation no longer appears on the review.)
Spin	B

The New York Times stated that the album "ambles through stereo-warped slide-guitar twangs and hall-of-mirrors funk as Tim Rutili contemplates apocalypse without raising his voice." The Chicago Tribune praised the "electronic experimentation" and "richly atmospheric tone poems"; the paper later listed Heron King Blues as the best local indie album of 2004. The Herald said that the bandmembers "have a unique, fractured take on the blues and country-rock music of their country: this is psychedelic, bizarre, low-key lunacy." The Times opined that "they seem to start out with complete chaos and somehow fashion a structure that mortal ears can comprehend (although the lyrics often still need some work)."

The Observer concluded that "the rolling, often improvised sections recall at times the calmer passages of Captain Beefheart, but boast a spirit all their own." The Toronto Star called the title track "a chugging, largely instrumental entry that sounds like a jam session involving Jeff Beck and an ensemble of new music gurus." The Sydney Morning Herald noted that Califone "share a space with the likes of Tom Waits in sounding both banged-up and spacious at once, arriving at an uneasy but magnetic beauty the way they shape their sonic clutter."

== Track listing ==
No.	Title	Length
1.	"Wingbone"
2.	"Trick Bird"
3.	"Sawtooth Sung a Cheater's Song"
4.	"Apple"
5.	"Lion & Bee"
6.	"2 Sisters Drunk on Each Other"
7.	"Heron King Blues"
8.	"Outro"
