= Stitches (album) =

Studio album by Califone
- Released: September 3, 2013
- Genre: Rock
- Length: 45:57
- Label: Dead Oceans

Califone chronology
| All My Friends Are Funeral Singers (2009) | Stitches (2013) |

Professional ratings
Aggregate scores
| Source | Rating |
|---|---|
| Metacritic | 81/100 |
Review scores
| Source | Rating |
| AllMusic | 4/5 stars |
| Paste | 8.9/10 |
| Slant Magazine | 4/5 stars |

Stitches is the seventh studio album by American band Califone. It was released in September 2013 under Dead Oceans.

== Track listing ==
| No. | Title | Length |
|---|---|---|
| 1. | "Movie Music Kills a Kiss" | 4:22 |
| 2. | "Stitches" | 3:33 |
| 3. | "Frosted Tips" | 4:03 |
| 4. | "Magdalene" | 5:19 |
| 5. | "Bells Break Arms" | 5:02 |
| 6. | "Moonbath.Brainsalt.A.Holy.Fool" | 6:41 |
| 7. | "Moses" | 4:09 |
| 8. | "A Thin Skin of Bullfight Dust" | 5:53 |
| 9. | "We Are a Payphone" | 4:17 |
| 10. | "Turtle Eggs/An Optimist" | 2:38 |
