= Bevel (musical project) =

Musical project of Via Nuon

Bevel is the musical project of Chicago-based Via Nuon, started in 2000. Nuon, a guitarist from Richmond, Virginia, played in Drunk before starting Manishevitz together with Adam Busch. The two moved to Chicago following the release of Manishevitz's first album Grammar Bell and the All Fall Down in 1999. Bevel's first three records were released on Jagjaguwar in the early '00s.

== Discography ==
- Turn The Furnace On (2000)
- Where Leaves Block The Sun (2002)
- Down The Puppet Strings, Marionettes (2004)
- Phoenician Terrane (2007)
- Twin Knowledge (2013)
- Angler Senses (2021)
