= Number One Cup =

- Also known as: The Eleventh Hour
- Origin: Chicago, Illinois
- Genres: Indie rock
- Years active: 1993–1998
- Labels: Flydaddy Records
- Past members: Seth Cohen; Michael Lenzi; Patrick O'Connel; John Przyborowski; Jenni Snyder; Pat Reis; Kurt Volk

Number One Cup was an American indie rock band based in Chicago, Illinois, United States.

== History ==
After leaving his band Eliot in 1993, guitarist Seth Cohen was interviewed by the Chicago weekly newspaper Newcity; when asked what he might do next, Cohen mentioned attending a show featuring Unrest, Gastr Del Sol, and Stereolab in Chicago. This caught the attention of guitarist Pat O'Connell and drummer Michael Lenzi, who both called Cohen after reading the article. As a result, the three formed Number One Cup.

Number One Cup released their first single, "Connecticut" in 1994 on Sweet Pea Records and started playing live shows. Cohen's former Eliot bandmate John Przyborowski filled in on bass until the band recruited Jenni Snyder. They released their second single, "Indie Softcore Denial" on Sweet Pea before Snyder left the band.

The trio then signed with Flydaddy Records and released their debut album, Possum Trot Plan, in 1995. Pat "Tiger" Reis briefly joined the band on bass, before Przyborowski once again filled in and eventually joined full-time. The band's single "Divebomb" was a minor hit on the UK Singles Chart in 1996, peaking at number 61.

John Peel of BBC Radio One invited Number One Cup to appear on the BBC in 1996, when he was sitting in for Mark Radcliffe on Radcliffe's show. In July 1996, the band, under the alias The Eleventh Hour, recorded a full LP of material, and released a 7" single on Wurlitzer Jukebox Records, in the UK. The Eleventh Hour LP, Radio Heaven, was released in March 2024. Number One Cup also recorded a Peel Session with John Peel on BBC Radio One on March 11, 1997.

In 1998, after recording their third album, People, People, Why Are We Fighting? Cohen broke his neck while playing hockey, and tour plans had to be postponed until he recovered. Around this time Kurt Volk replaced Przyborowski on bass, but their 1998 album was to be their last and the band split in 1999.

Cohen and Lenzi went on to form the group The Fire Show, active from 1999 to 2002.

== Members ==
- Seth Cohen - Guitar
- Pat O'Connell - Guitar
- Michael Lenzi - Drums
- John Przyborowski - Bass
- Jenni Snyder - Bass
- Pat Reis - Bass
- Kurt Volk - Bass

== Discography ==
=== Albums ===
- Possum Trot Plan (Flydaddy Records, 1995)
- Wrecked by Lions (Flydaddy, 1997)
- People People, Why Are We Fighting? (Flydaddy, 1998)
- Radio Heaven (as The Eleventh Hour) (Recorded July 1996; Released March 2024)

== Singles & EPs ==
- Indie Softcore Denial (7”, 1994)
- Connecticut (7”, 1994)
- The Monkey Song (7”, 1995)
- Divebomb (1996)
- Kim Chee is Cabbage (CD, EP, 1996)
- Malcolm’s X-Ray Picnic (1996)
- Red Red Meat / Number One Cup 7” split-single (1996)
- Just Let Go (7”/CD single, 1996)
- The Team That Never Wins (7", 1997) (as The Eleventh Hour
- Number One Cup / Spare Snare - The Money Pit Volume 1 (7”/CD, 1997)
- Ease Back Down/Paris (7”/ CD Single, 1997)
- The Monkey Song (CD / 7” Single, 1997)
- Remote Control (CD / 7” Single, 1999)

== Compilations ==
- Rock N' Roll (Demos, B-sides, Rehearsal Tapes, Radio Performances, Live Recordings and other minor masterpieces) (September 2023)
