= Broom (album) =

Studio album by Someone Still Loves You Boris Yeltsin
- Released: March 11, 2005; October 24, 2006 (reissue)
- Recorded: 2004–2005
- Genre: Indie pop
- Length: 29:04
- Label: Self-released; Polyvinyl (reissue); PRC-122
- Producer: SSLYBY and Jonathan James

Someone Still Loves You Boris Yeltsin chronology
Gwyn and Grace EP (2004)	Broom (2005)	Pershing (2008)

Professional ratings
Review scores
Source	Rating
AllMusic	3.5/5 stars
Pitchfork Media	(6.9/10)

Broom is a full-length album from American indie pop/rock band Someone Still Loves You Boris Yeltsin. It was released in the United States in 2005.

== Track listing ==
1. "Pangea" – 2:48
2. "I Am Warm & Powerful" – 2:39
3. "What'll We Do" – 2:16
4. "Travel Song" – 3:21
5. "Oregon Girl" – 2:26
6. "House Fire" – 3:19
7. "Yr Broom" – 1:37
8. "Anna Lee" – 3:16
9. "Anne Elephant" – 4:49
10. "Gwyneth" – 2:33
- The Polyvinyl LP-reissue includes three bonus songs: "Let's Get Tired", "Warm & Powerful" (acoustic), and "Song W".

== Personnel ==
- John Robert Cardwell – vocals, guitars
- Will Knauer – guitars
- Tom Hembree – bass
- Philip Dickey – drums, vocals, guitars, piano
- Mark Bilyeu – mastering
- Jonathan James – mixing
- Aaron Scott – photography, layout design

=== Additional personnel ===
- Lauren Slater – Rhodes on "Pangea", "I Am Warm and Powerful", "Anne Elephant"
- Gwyn Knauer and Beth Cain – additional vocals on "What'll We Do"
