= Gold Past Life =

Studio album by Fruit Bats
- Released: June 21, 2019
- Genres: Indie rock, indie pop, indie folk, soft rock
- Length: 38:44
- Label: Merge Records
- Producer: Thom Monahan

Fruit Bats chronology
Absolute Loser (2016)	Gold Past Life (2019)	The Pet Parade (2021)

Gold Past Life is the ninth studio album by Fruit Bats, released on June 21, 2019, via Merge Records.

== Reception ==
Professional ratings
Aggregate scores
Source	Rating
Metacritic	78/100
Review scores
Source	Rating
Exclaim!	7/10
Paste	7.0/10
PopMatters	8/10 stars
Variety	4/5 stars

Gold Past Life received generally favorable reviews from critics. At Metacritic, which assigns a normalized rating out of 100 to reviews from mainstream publications, the album received an average score of 78 based on nine reviews.

== Track listing ==
All tracks are written by Eric D. Johnson.

No.	Title	Length
1.	"The Bottom of It"	3:01
2.	"Gold Past Life"	3:30
3.	"Drawn Away"	4:06
4.	"Cazadera"	3:25
5.	"Ocean"	3:18
6.	"Your Dead Grandfather"	2:50
7.	"A Lingering Love"	3:57
8.	"Barely Living Room"	3:26
9.	"Mandy from Mohawk (Wherever You May Be)"	3:47
10.	"Dream Would Breathe"	3:57
11.	"Two Babies in Michigan"	3:47

== Charts ==
Chart	Peak position
US Heatseekers Albums (Billboard)	13
US Independent Albums (Billboard)	37
