= Cougar (band) =

American instrumental post-rock band

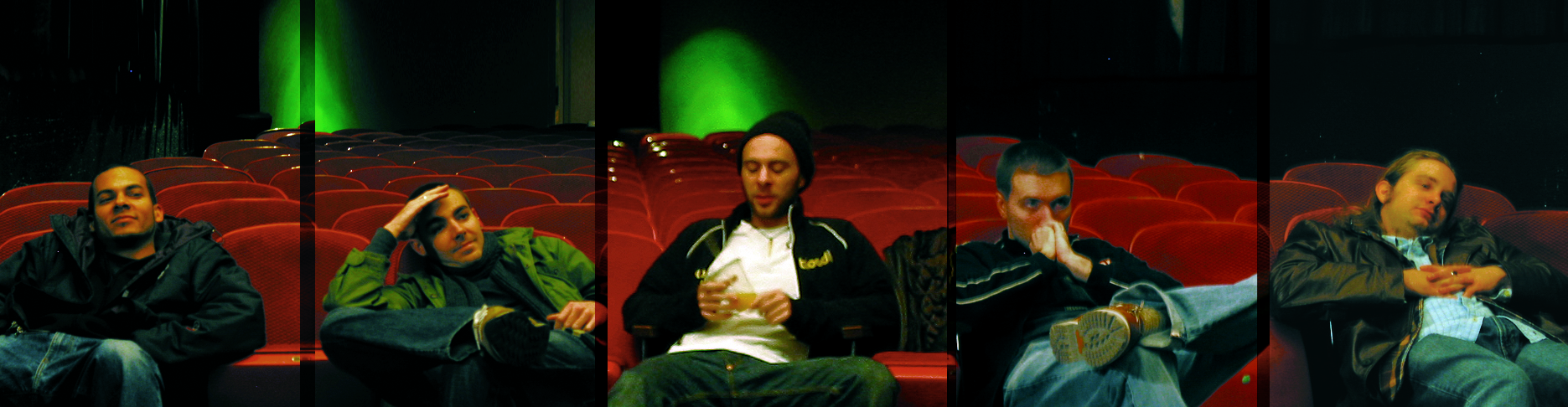
- Press photo of Cougar

Background information
- Origin: United States
- Genres: Rock; Post-rock; Experimental; Psychedelic music
- Years active: 2005 – present
- Labels: Layered Music
- Members: D.H. Skogen; Dan Venne; Trent Johnson; Aaron Sleator; Todd Hill
- Website: cougarsound.com

Cougar is an instrumental post-rock band from Madison, Wisconsin, formed in 2003. It was formerly on the Madison-based record label Layered Music (the label of Youngblood Brass Band, of which drummer D.H. Skogen is also a member). Cougar toured the United States, Europe and the UK on the release of their debut album, Law, during early 2007, including a well-received show in Madison.

== Discography ==
=== Law ===
Law is Cougar's debut album. It was recorded at Layered Studios in Madison and released by Layered Music in Europe in February 2006, and in America on February 20, 2007. It was distributed by Play It Again Sam.

Cover of Cougar's debut record, Law

1. "Atlatl" – 5:36
2. "One" – 0:49
3. "Strict Scrutiny" – 5:06
4. "Pulse Conditioner" – 4:01
5. "Interracial Dating" – 3:30
6. "Two" – 0:47
7. "Your Excellency" – 5:34
8. "Three" – 0:41
9. "Lifetime Ranger" – 4:28
10. "Four" – 0:38
11. "The Mosaicist" – 5:20
12. "Black Dove" – 5:43
13. "Five" – 0:59
14. "Merit" – 3:39
15. "Postscript" – 0:47

All tracks written by Cougar.

- Todd Hill – bass guitar
- Trent Johnson – guitar
- DH Skogen – percussion
- Aaron Sleator – electronics, guitar
- Dan Venne – guitar
- John McEntire – additional recording and mixing
- Satoshi Shinozaki – recording of strings on "Black Dove"
- Christian Zamora – strings on "Black Dove"

Reviews

- Pitchfork Media (6.7/10) link
- Time Out Chicago link
- XLR8R (8/10) link

=== Patriot ===
Patriot is the second studio album by instrumental band Cougar, released in August 2009.

While reception was warm, reviewers tussled with the task of pigeonholing the sound of the album, roll-calling contemporary and influential bands and works. Rock Sound reviewer Dan Morgan illustrated the album's sound: "polyrhythmic Fugazi structures merge delicately with angelic post rock and the sort of even-handed electronica that 65daysofstatic might produce if their parents forced them onto Ritalin." Likewise, Alexander Tudor of Drowned in Sound questioned the categorisation of the band and their sound: "Does the grey area between (guitar-led, crescendo-prone) post-rock and instrumental electronica actually have a name we can agree on… or is this what Simon Reynolds had in mind when he coined post-rock, in the mid-Nineties?" Structurally, he compares the album to Mogwai's Mr Beast, Björk and Meanwhile, back in Communist Russia.... Writing for the NME, Matt Warwick describes the track "Florida Logic" as "Mars Volta-inspired".

All tracks are written by Cougar, except "Endings", by Jeff Snyder.

| No. | Title | Length |
|---|---|---|
| 1. | "Stay Famous" | 4:49 |
| 2. | "Florida Logic" | 3:36 |
| 3. | "Rhinelander" | 5:00 |
| 4. | "Pelourinho" | 4:41 |
| 5. | "Thundersnow" | 1:56 |
| 6. | "Heavy into Jeff" | 3:22 |
| 7. | "Endings" | 4:19 |
| 8. | "This is an Affidavit" | 4:11 |
| 9. | "Appomattox" | 5:35 |
| 10. | "Daunte v. Armada" | 4:41 |
| 11. | "Absaroka" | 3:42 |

Band members

- David Henzie-Skogen – percussion; recording
- Todd Hill – bass guitar
- Trent Johnson – guitar
- Aaron Sleator – electronics, synths and guitar; recording
- Dan Venne – guitar; recording
- Nic Cowles – flute on "Absaroka"
- Sinead Nic Gearailt – harp on "Pelourinho"
- James Murray – vocals on "Rhinelander"
- Nat McIntosh – euphonium on "Absaroka"
- Daniel Miles – bass clarinet on "This is an Affidavit" and "Absaroka"
- Scott Pauli – photography and design
- Amelia Royko – vocals on "Rhinelander"
- Anna Suechting – French horn on "This is an Affidavit" and "Absaroka"
- Roger Siebel – mastering
- Beau Sorenson – mixing
- Peter Streicher – photography and design

Reviews

- Drowned in Sound (7/10)
- NME (8/10)
- Rock Sound (8/10)

== See also ==
- Cultural significance of the cougar in North America
