= Let It Sway =

Studio album by Someone Still Loves You Boris Yeltsin
- Released: August 17, 2010
- Recorded: Fall 2009 in Madison, Wisconsin, and Portland, Oregon. Additional recording Winter 2009 in Springfield, Missouri.
- Genre: Indie pop
- Length: 41:10
- Label: Polyvinyl PRC-197
- Producers: Chris Walla and Beau Sorenson

Someone Still Loves You Boris Yeltsin chronology
Pershing (2008)	Let It Sway (2010)	Tape Club (2011)

Professional ratings
Aggregate scores
Source	Rating
Metacritic	74/100
Review scores
Source	Rating
Allmusic	3.5/5 stars
Alternative Press	3.5/5 stars
Drowned In Sound	9/10 stars
Mixtape Muse	4/5 stars
Pitchfork Media	(6.8/10)
ReviewRinseRepeat	3/5 stars
Venus Zine	3.5/5 stars

Let It Sway is the third full-length studio album from American indie pop/rock band Someone Still Loves You Boris Yeltsin. It was released through Polyvinyl Records on August 17, 2010.

== Track listing ==
1. "Back in the Saddle " – 4:28
2. "Sink/Let It Sway" – 3:05
3. "Banned (By The Man)" – 3:45
4. "In Pairs" – 3:04
5. "My Terrible Personality" – 2:53
6. "Everlyn" – 3:01
7. "Stuart Gets Lost Dans Le Métro" – 4:23
8. "All Hail Dracula!" – 3:05
9. "Critical Drain" – 2:44
10. "Animalkind" – 2:30
11. "Phantomwise" - 3:41
12. "Made to Last" - 4:31
13. "Bended" - 4:58*
14. "Cardinal Rules" - 2:17*
15. "Tanks Jam" - 3:44*

*Digital bonus tracks

== Personnel ==
The band members are credited as follows.

- John Robert Cardwell - lead and backing vocals, guitars, mandolin, bass, timpani
- Will Knauer - guitars
- Jonathan James - bass, backing vocals, guitars, drums
- Philip Dickey - drums, backing and lead vocals, guitars, acoustic and Wurlitzer electric pianos, synthesizers, marimba

=== Additional musicians ===
- Chris Walla - synthesizers, guitars, Wurlitzer electric piano, percussion
- Mark Cassidy - banjo

== Production ==
- Produced by Chris Walla of Death Cab for Cutie and Beau Sorenson.
- Recording done September 2009 at Smart Studios in Madison, Wisconsin, and fall 2009 at Alberta Court in Portland, Oregon. Additional recording done winter 2010 in Springfield, Missouri by Jonathan James and SSLYBY.
- Mixed by Beau Sorenson at Smart Studios in February 2010. "In Pairs," "My Terrible Personality," and "Phantomwise" mixed by Chris Walla at Tiny Telephone Studios in San Francisco, California. "Stuart" mixed by Jonathan James and SSLYBY.
- Mastering completed by Roger Seibel at SAE Digital Mastering Services on April 13, 2010.
- The album cover depicts a photograph of a top-down view of the Balinese Kecak Dance.

== Notes ==
- Art direction: Aaron Scott and Someone Still Loves You Boris Yeltsin
- Band photos: Chris Beckman and Sophie Parker
- Painting: David Guinn
- Cover photo: Co Rentmeester. Used by permission.
- "Phantomwise" contains lyrics from an acrostic by Lewis Carroll.
