= Tripper (Fruit Bats album) =

Studio album by Fruit Bats
- Released: August 2, 2011
- Genre: Indie rock, indie pop, indie folk, soft rock
- Length: 40:40
- Label: Sub Pop
- Producer: Thom Monahan

Fruit Bats chronology
| The Ruminant Band (2009) | Tripper (2011) | Absolute Loser (2016) |

Professional ratings
Aggregate scores
| Source | Rating |
|---|---|
| Metacritic | 74/100 |
Review scores
| Source | Rating |
| AllMusic | 3.5/5 stars |
| Consequence of Sound | C+ |
| Drowned in Sound | 8/10 |
| MSN Music (Expert Witness) | A– |
| Pitchfork | 6.8/10 |
| PopMatters | 7/10 stars |
| The Quietus | (favorable) |

Tripper is the fifth full-length album by indie rock band Fruit Bats. It was released on August 2, 2011, on Sub Pop Records. A 1980s-esque music video for the song "You're Too Weird" preceded the release of the album.

== Track listing ==
1. Tony the Tripper
2. So Long
3. Tangie and Ray
4. Shivering Fawn
5. You're Too Weird
6. Heart Like an Orange
7. Dolly
8. The Banishment Song
9. The Fen
10. Wild Honey
11. Picture of a Bird
12. Wac’s (ITunes Bonus Track Only)
