= Fly by Wire (album) =

Studio album by Someone Still Loves You Boris Yeltsin
- Released: September 17, 2013
- Recorded: February–April 2013 in the attic on Weller Street, Springfield, Missouri.
- Genre: Indie pop
- Length: 32:07
- Label: Polyvinyl Records PRC-266
- Producer: Someone Still Loves You Boris Yeltsin

Someone Still Loves You Boris Yeltsin chronology
Let It Sway (2010)	Fly by Wire (2013)	The High Country (2015)

Professional ratings
Aggregate scores
Source	Rating
Metacritic	64/100
Review scores
Source	Rating
AllMusic	3.5/5 stars

Fly By Wire is the fifth full-length studio album from American indie pop band Someone Still Loves You Boris Yeltsin. It was released through Polyvinyl Records on September 17, 2013.

== Track listing ==
1. "Harrison Ford" – 3:30
2. "Young Presidents" – 2:59
3. "Cover All Sides" – 3:06
4. "Lucky Young" – 3:57
5. "Ms. Dot" – 2:32
6. "Loretta" – 2:40
7. "Unearth" – 2:47
8. "Bright Leaves" – 2:16
9. "Nightwater Girlfriend" – 3:23
10. "Fly By Wire" – 4:57

== Personnel ==
The band members are credited as follows.

- Will Knauer
- Jonathan James
- Philip Dickey

=== Additional musicians ===
- Grace Bentley - vocals on Bright Leaves, co-writer on Young Presidents and Harrison Ford
- Roni Dickey - clarinet on Loretta, organ on Bright Leaves
- Brook Linder - vocals on Young Presidents, Harrison Ford, and Loretta
- Mizuki Takahashi - ambient sounds on Fly By Wire

== Production ==
- Produced by Someone Still Loves You Boris Yeltsin.
- Recording done from February to April 2013 in the attic on Weller Street in Springfield, Missouri.
- Mixed by Sonny Diperri at Octopus Break.
- Mastered by Carl Saff.
