= Not Worth Fighting =

EP by Someone Still Loves You Boris Yeltsin
- Released: May 8, 2007
- Genre: Indie rock
- Length: 5:23
- Label: Polyvinyl

Not Worth Fighting is an EP written and recorded by American indie rock band Someone Still Loves You Boris Yeltsin.

== Track listing ==
1. "Half-Awake (Deb)" – 2:17
2. "It's Not Worth Fighting" – 3:06
