= The Fire Show =

American indie rock band from Chicago

The Fire Show was an American indie rock band from Chicago signed to Perishable Records. They released three albums on the label in the period 2000–2002.

== History ==
Bandmembers Seth Cohen and Michael Lenzi played in the group Number One Cup together in the late 1990s, but in September 1998, Cohen broke his neck playing ice hockey. He recovered in time to tour with Number One Cup to support their third album, but soon after, that group splintered, leaving Cohen embittered. Despite mutual tension between the former bandmates, Cohen and Lenzi began talking and writing songs together later in 1999, and put together a new four-member ensemble. The pair gave themselves the stage names M. Resplendent and Olias Nil while working with the band. As an ensemble, they initially took the name X-Vessel, but bassist Brian Lubinsky left the group in 2000 and they renamed themselves The Fire Show. After seeing them play in January 2000 at the Lounge Ax, Tim Rutili signed them to his label Perishable Records. Perishable released three albums of theirs – a self-titled record in 2000, Above the Volcano of Flowers in 2001, and Saint the Fire Show in 2002.

They broke up soon after the release of Saint the Fire Show. Lenzi went on to work under the name Resplendent. Cohen moved to England, where he became a student.

== Members ==
- Seth Cohen ("Olias Nil") – guitar
- Michael Lenzi ("M. Resplendent") – guitar, vocals, electronics
- Brian Lubinsky – bass
- Eric Rorth – drums
- John Pyx Klos – bass
- Bob Kohlman – drums

== Discography ==
- The Fire Show (Perishable Records, 2000)
- Above the Volcano of Flowers (Perishable, 2001)
- Saint The Fire Show (Perishable, 2002)
