= Margot & the Nuclear So and So's =

American rock band

Background information
- Origin: Indianapolis, Indiana, US
- Genres: Indie rock; Folk rock; Chamber pop
- Label: Mariel Recording Company
- Members: Richard Edwards; Tyler Watkins; Heidi Gluck; Kenny Childers; Ronnie Kwasman
- Past members: Andy Fry; Emily Watkins; Hubert Glover; Jesse Lee; Casey Tennis; Brian Deck; Gary Vermillion; Erik Kang; Chris Fry; Kate Myers; Cameron McGill
- Website: margotandthenuclearsoandsos.com

Margot & the Nuclear So and So's is an American rock band from Indianapolis, Indiana. Between 2006 and 2014, the band released 6 full-length albums.

== History ==
The band's founding members, Richard Edwards and Andy Fry, met while teens. Eventually, in 2004, the two formed Margot & the Nuclear So and So's, named after the character Margot in Wes Anderson's 2001 film The Royal Tenenbaums.

Over time, many friends of Edwards and Fry in the Indianapolis area joined the band. By the time their first album The Dust of Retreat was released in 2006, the band contained eight full-time members.

After a move to Chicago in 2009, Edwards began to experiment with a new band lineup, and eventually decided on a six-man group made up of some former members and some Chicago-area musicians. This new lineup allowed Edwards to take the band in a more rock-based direction, which could be seen in their next two studio albums Buzzard (2010), and Rot Gut, Domestic (2012).

In an interview with blogger Adam Vitcavage, Edwards discussed his battle with Clostridioides difficile colitis as well as the future of the band. Edwards proclaimed, "I've threatened to break up this stupid band so many times, I don't want to continue crying wolf. That said, I don't currently see any real reason for Margot to continue."

== Releases ==
The band's first full album, The Dust of Retreat, was released in 2005 through Standard Recording Company. It was remastered and re-released on March 26, 2006, by Artemis Records. The style was described by MacKenzie Wilson as "cinematic chamber pop" that "both the casual music fan and music perfectionist will enjoy".

Two full lengths were released on October 7, 2008, Animal! and Not Animal. All releases were by Epic Records. Four intimate live recordings of songs, two of which are exclusive to Animal!, were available for free download on the website Daytrotter.

There were delays in the release of the band's second full-length due to disagreements between the band and Epic Records regarding the song selection of the album. Animal! is Margot's preferred version of the album, while Not Animal is Epic Records's. Five songs appear on both releases, out of the 12 tracks on each album. On their MySpace page, the band said they would like fans to listen to Animal! first. The band was a featured musical guest on Late Night with Conan O'Brien in November 2008. They played their new song "As Tall As Cliffs", one of the songs on both records.

The band released their third album, Buzzard, on September 21, 2010, via Mariel Recordings, their own label with distribution through Redeye. The album features many Chicago musicians and friends of the band, including Tim Rutili, Joe Adamik, Cameron McGill, Katie Todd, Brian Deck, and Ronnie Kwasman.

Their fourth album, Rot Gut, Domestic, produced by John Congleton, was released early to pledges for digital download via PledgeMusic on March 12, 2012. The CD and vinyl versions were released nationally on March 20, 2012.

Margot's fifth album, Sling Shot to Heaven was released on April 22, 2014, through the Mariel Records. Also released with this was a movie shot on 16 mm film entitled Tell Me More About Evil: A Film about Margot & the Nuclear So and So's. This film included stripped-down versions of many album tracks and also included some voice narration. On November 4, 2014, the soundtrack to the film was released as a digital download, on vinyl, and on cassette tape.

Richard Edwards worked on compiling a rarities box set that encompassed all of their studio albums. In 2015, the band released The Bride On The Boxcar – A Decade of Margot Rarities: 2004–2014, through Joyful Noise Recordings. is broken up into five different eras on different albums. The five parts of the set are: "Hybristophilia", "PANIC ATTACKS (Low Level Bummer)", "Now, Let's Risk Our Feathers", "Dark Energy in the Spotlight", and "You Look Like the Future, Baby". Each disc represents an era in the band. It was released on vinyl and digital download.

On January 24, 2017, Edwards officially announced the release date of his first solo album, Lemon Cotton Candy Sunset. The album was released on March 31, 2017, via Joyful Noise Recordings. The first single, "Disappeared Planets", was made available to stream on the album's website.

== Members ==
Present

- Richard Edwards – vocals, guitar
- Tyler Watkins – bass, vocals
- Heidi Gluck – vocals, keys, bass
- Kenny Childers – guitars, vocals
- Ronnie Kwasman – guitar

Former

- Andy Fry – guitar, vocals
- Emily Watkins – keyboards, vocals
- Hubert Glover – trumpet, tambourine
- Jesse Lee – cello
- Casey Tennis – auxiliary percussion
- Brian Deck – drums
- Gary Vermillion – auxiliary percussion
- Erik Kang – violin, lap steel, guitar
- Chris Fry – drums
- Kate Myers – vocals, guitar
- Cameron McGill – keyboards, vocals, harmonica

== Discography ==
Studio albums

- I Was an Astronaut (as Archer Avenue) (2003)
- The Dust of Retreat (2006)
- Animal! (2008)
- Not Animal (2008)
- Buzzard (2010)
- Rot Gut, Domestic (2012)
- Sling Shot to Heaven (2014)
- Lemon Cotton Candy Sunset (2017)
- Verdugo (2018)

Demos

- Vulgar in the Chapel – The Animal!/Not Animal Demo Recordings (2018)

Compilations

- The Bride on the Boxcar – A Decade of Margot Rarities: 2004–2014 (2015)

Singles and EPs

- Vampires in Blue Dresses EP (2006)
- "Broadripple Is Burning"/"Holy Cow" 7" (2006)
- "Brand New Key"/"Jesus Christ Blues" 7" (2008)
- The Daytrotter Sessions EP (2008)
- "Birds"/"Bubbleprick" 7" (2010)
- Happy Hour at Spriggs (Volume One) EP (2010)
- "Prozac Rock"/"Fingertips" 7" (2011)
- "Your Sister's House"/"Beating Off in Public" 7" (2014)
