= Spelled in Bones =

Studio album by Fruit Bats
- Released: 26 July 2005
- Genre: Folk rock
- Length: 35:41
- Label: Sub Pop
- Producer: Dan Strack

Fruit Bats chronology
Mouthfuls (2003)	Spelled in Bones (2005)	The Ruminant Band (2009)

Professional ratings
Review scores
Source	Rating
AllMusic	4/5 stars
Pitchfork Media	6.3/10
Slant Magazine	3.5/5 stars

Spelled in Bones is the third album by American folk-rock band Fruit Bats, released in 2005.

== Track listing ==
1. "Lives of Crime" – 3:53
2. "Silent Life" – 3:12
3. "TV Waves" – 3:43
4. "Canyon Girl" – 2:41
5. "Born in the '70s" – 3:08
6. "Legs of Bees" – 4:03
7. "The Earthquake of '73" – 3:20
8. "Traveler's Song" – 2:48
9. "The Wind That Blew My Heart Away" – 2:43
10. "Spelled in Bones" – 3:44
11. "Everyday That We Wake Up It's a Beautiful Day" – 2:26
