= Someone Still Loves You Boris Yeltsin =

American indie pop band

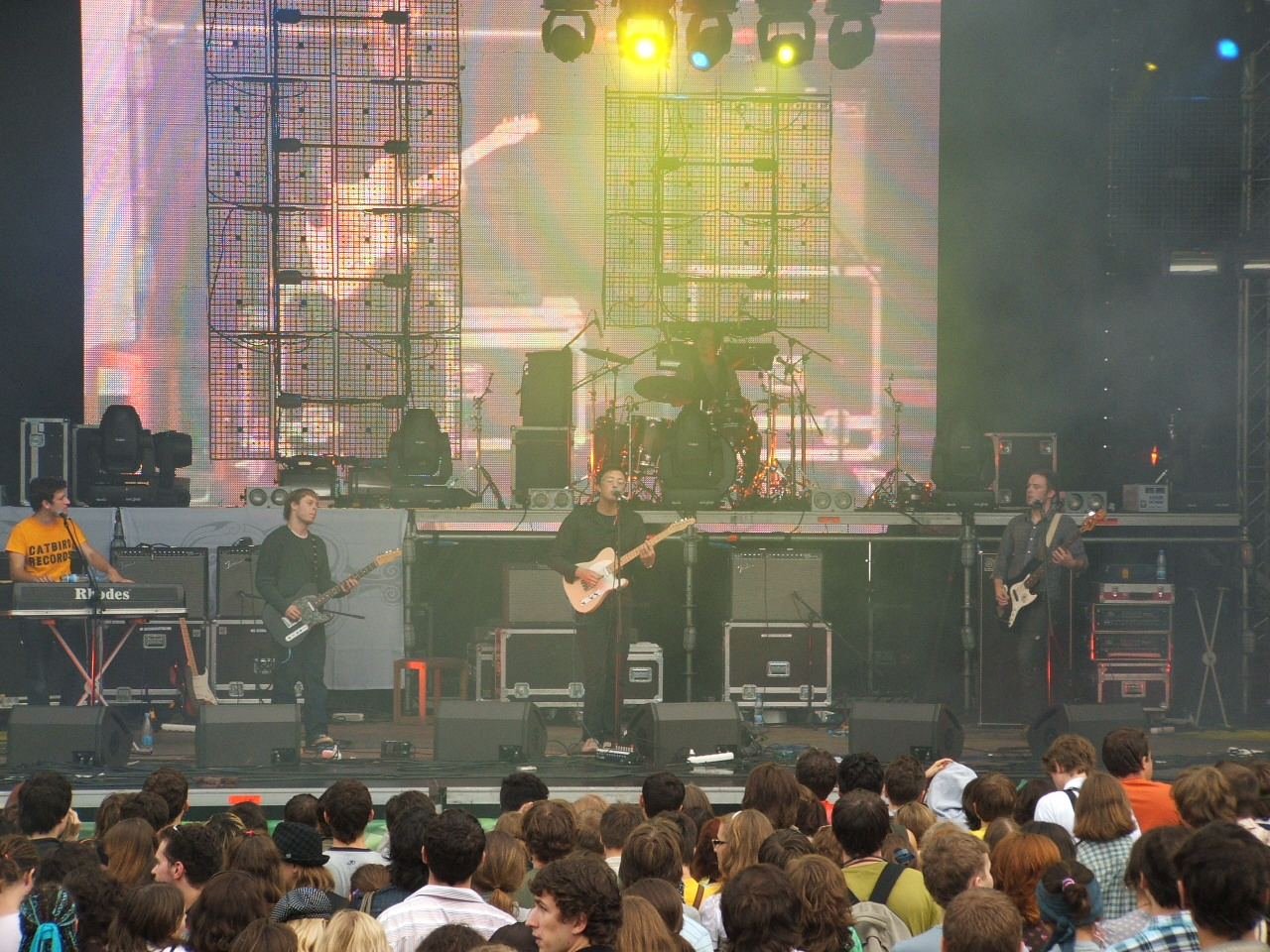
- SSLYBY in concert in Moscow, Russia.

Background information
- Origin: Springfield, Missouri, U.S.
- Genres: Indie pop Alternative rock
- Years active: 2002–2016
- Label: Polyvinyl Record Co.
- Past members: Will Knauer; Philip Dickey; Jonathan James; Tom Hembree; Roni Dickey; John Robert Cardwell
- Website: www.sslyby.com

Someone Still Loves You Boris Yeltsin (SSLYBY) were an American indie pop band from Springfield, Missouri that formed in 2002. They were named after Boris Yeltsin, the first President of Russia after the breakup of the Soviet Union. Their first full-length album, Broom, was independently released in 2005. They later signed to Polyvinyl Record Co., where they remained for the remainder of their career.

== Biography ==
Will Knauer and Philip Dickey were friends in high school. Phil and John Robert Cardwell met in 2002 during their freshman year of college and started writing songs together.

From 2002 to 2004, the group recorded demos at home and in their dorm rooms while playing local shows in Springfield and Columbia, Missouri. The group's first release was a split EP with the vocal duo Gwyn and Grace in 2004.

In Fall 2004 the group began recording their first full-length album, Broom, at Knauer's house, which is featured in much of the band's artwork. Broom was released in March 2005. The debut was seen as an indie success, and received favorable press in Spin Magazine and internet buzz from blogs like You Ain't No Picasso and Bars and Guitars, while Pitchfork gave the album an average rating, 6.9/10.0. Shortly after releasing Broom, SSLYBY released a split record with Michael Holt, formerly of the Mommyheads, on Catbird Records (a label started by the blog site Catbirdseat) in 2005.

In February 2006, the band went on their first national support tour opening up for Catfish Haven (from the Secretly Canadian label). On the same tour, the group recorded their first session for the music website Daytrotter. Later that year, the band's song "Oregon Girl" was featured on an episode of The OC.

The group signed to Polyvinyl Records in June 2006 and re-released Broom in October 2006. Because the original version of the album was recorded by the band with their own equipment (including a Boss digital multitrack recorder using only Shure SM57 and SM58 microphones), it was not professionally mastered to the same level as most industry-standard releases. The lo-fi sound drew many critics and listeners to the band.

In July 2007, SSLYBY performed at the Afisha Picnic music festival in Moscow, Russia, just three months after the death of Boris Yeltsin.

The group returned to Springfield to record their highly anticipated follow up to Broom. Unable to record at Knauer's house because of noise complaints, the band moved their home recording studio to Knauer's aunt's house.

Pershing was released on April 8, 2008 on Polyvinyl Records. The album spawned three music videos: "Think I Wanna Die" directed by Grammy-nominated director Israel Anthem and featuring members of the band Eisley, and "Modern Mystery" and "Glue Girls", both directed by Brook Linder.

The band was named the "best new band in Missouri" by the Boston Phoenix despite the "cutesy, irritating quality of its six-word name". Pershing was named the best album of 2008 by the blogs It's Hard to Find A Friend, The Stark Online, and The Power Pop Show. Blender Magazine ranked "Dead Right" as one of the top 200 songs of 2008.

In 2008 the band released a split EP with the Liverpool band Puzzle, licensed their song "Anne Elephant" to a MasterCard commercial, and made their network television performance debut on the Carson Daly Show.

SSLYBY's third album under Polyvinyl, Let It Sway, was produced by Chris Walla of Death Cab for Cutie and Beau Sorenson.

On October 22, 2010, NME.com debuted the music video for "Sink/Let It Sway" directed by Brook Linder. The band and Linder would pair up again in early 2011 to make a video for "Critical Drain", which premiered on MTV.com.

In early 2011, the band supported Tokyo Police Club on a US tour. Later that year, they released Tape Club, a collection of b-sides and rarities.

The band released a new album on September 17, 2013 entitled Fly by Wire. News of this album coincides with John Robert's departure from the band. As Phil would now be required to cover vocals full-time, Tom Hembree was brought back to the band to take over bassist duties, and Phil's sister Roni was added as a keyboardist.

On March 5, 2015, it was announced via the band's official Twitter page that a new album would be released in the summer of 2015. A teaser trailer for the album was simultaneously released on YouTube. Later that month, on March 26, it was announced that the album would be called The High Country; it was released on June 2, 2015. The band's final show to date took place on August 1, 2015 at Webster Hall in Manhattan. The band's final release was a cover of Saturday Looks Good to Me's "Since You Stole My Heart," featuring Julia Steiner of Ratboys, which featured on the compilation Polyvinyl Plays Polyvinyl in 2016. Dickey would later go on to front the musical project Dragon Inn 3, while Knauer would go on to form the band Hey Pam!. In 2025, Polyvinyl released a 20th anniversary reissue of Broom, including two previously-unreleased songs, an acoustic version of "I am Warm and Powerful" and a demo version of "What'll We Do".

== Members ==
=== Final line-up ===
- Philip Dickey – lead vocals, rhythm guitar, drums, keyboards (2002–2016)
- Will Knauer – lead guitar (2002–2016)
- Jonathan James – drums, rhythm guitar, backing vocals (2007–2016)
- Tom Hembree – bass (2004–2007, 2013–2016)

=== Former ===
- John Robert Cardwell – lead vocals, rhythm guitar, bass, drums (2002–2013)
- Roni Dickey – keyboards (2013–2016)

== Discography ==
=== Albums ===
- Broom (2005, Generic Equivalent; reissued on Polyvinyl Records in 2006, 2011 and 2025)
- Pershing (2008, Polyvinyl Records) US Heatseekers #39
- Let It Sway (2010, Polyvinyl Records) US Heatseekers #19
- Fly by Wire (2013, Polyvinyl Records) US Heatseekers #31
- The High Country (2015, Polyvinyl Records)

=== Other releases ===
- Split CD Vol. 6 (with Grace and Gwyn) - Sew, Sew, Suck Your Toe (2004, Generic Equivalent)
- Two People... Probably Thinking About Me EP (Generic Equivalent) (2004, also known as "Gwyn and Grace" and untitled)
- Someone Still Loves You Michael Holt (2005, Catbird Records)
- 'Haircuts' split cd w/Nathaniel Carroll (2006, Things That Are True)
- Daytrotter Sessions (2006, 2008, 2011, and 2013)
- Not Worth Fighting single (2007, Polyvinyl Records / PRC-134)
- Pangea single (2007, Polyvinyl Records)
- Someone Still Loves You Boris Yeltsin/Puzzle (2008, Polyvinyl Records)
- 'Back To You' for Fast Forward World Cup Compilation (2010, Indiecater Records)
- Tape Club (2011, Polyvinyl Records) US Heatseekers #49

== Other projects ==
- Winter's Bone soundtrack (Jonathan James recorded and mixed several songs)
- Yawn
- The Current Group
- mrPunch
- Wharf
- Sweetwater Abilene
- The New Monsters Collective
- Dragon Inn 3
