= Absolute Loser =

Studio album by Fruit Bats
- Released: May 13, 2016
- Genres: Indie rock, indie pop, indie folk, soft rock
- Length: 37:30
- Label: Easy Sound Recording Company
- Producer: Thom Monahan

Fruit Bats chronology
| Tripper (2011) | Absolute Loser (2016) | Gold Past Life (2019) |

Absolute Loser is the seventh studio album by Fruit Bats, released on May 13, 2016, via Easy Sound Recording Company, a subsidiary of Welk Music Group.

== Reception ==
Professional ratings
Aggregate scores
| Source | Rating |
|---|---|
| Metacritic | 75/100 |
Review scores
| Source | Rating |
| AllMusic | 4/5 stars |
| Consequence of Sound | B− |
| American Songwriter | 4/5 stars |
| Paste | 8.5/10 |

Absolute Loser received generally favorable reviews from critics. At Metacritic, which assigns a normalized rating out of 100 to reviews from mainstream publications, the album received an average score of 75 based on six reviews.

== Track listing ==
All tracks are written by Eric D. Johnson.

| No. | Title | Length |
|---|---|---|
| 1. | "From a Soon-to-Be Ghost Town" | 3:39 |
| 2. | "Humbug Mountain Song" | 3:04 |
| 3. | "None of Us" | 4:09 |
| 4. | "Absolute Loser" | 3:52 |
| 5. | "Baby Bluebird" | 3:50 |
| 6. | "My Sweet Midwest" | 5:04 |
| 7. | "Birthday Drunk" | 3:56 |
| 8. | "Good Will Come to You" | 3:30 |
| 9. | "It Must Be Easy" | 2:58 |
| 10. | "Don’t You Know That" | 3:29 |
