= Mouthfuls =

Studio album by Fruit Bats
- Released: 8 April 2003
- Genre: Folk rock
- Length: 44:54
- Label: Sub Pop
- Producer: Brian Deck

Fruit Bats chronology
Echolocation (2001)	Mouthfuls (2003)	Spelled in Bones (2005)

Professional ratings
Review scores
Source	Rating
AllMusic	3.5/5 stars
Pitchfork Media	7.1/10

Mouthfuls is the second album by American folk-rock band Fruit Bats, released in 2003.

== Track listing ==
All tracks are written by Eric D. Johnson, unless otherwise stated.

No.	Title	Lyrics	Music	Length
1.	"Rainbow Sign"			3:24
2.	"A Bit of Wind"			4:15
3.	"Magic Hour"	E. Johnson	E. Johnson, Gillian Lisée	3:39
4.	"The Little Acorn"			6:26
5.	"Track Rabbits"	E. Johnson	E. Johnson, Gillian Lisée	3:10
6.	"Union Blanket"			5:19
7.	"Lazy Eye"			5:30
8.	"Slipping Through the Sensors"			4:52
9.	"Seaweed"			3:42
10.	"When U Love Somebody"			4:31
