= Pershing (album) =

Studio album by Someone Still Loves You Boris Yeltsin
- Released: April 8, 2008
- Recorded: March 2007 at Fre's loft in Wilmington, N.C. and from August to December 2007 in Springfield, MO
- Genre: Indie pop
- Length: 34:53
- Label: Polyvinyl Records
- Producer: Someone Still Loves You Boris Yeltsin

Someone Still Loves You Boris Yeltsin chronology
Broom (2005)	Pershing (2008)	Let It Sway (2010)

Professional ratings
Review scores
Source	Rating
30Music.com	8.3/10 link
AbsolutePunk.net	90% link
Allmusic	link
Pitchfork Media	6.2/10 link
Spin	link
XLR8R	link

Pershing is the second full-length studio album from American indie pop band Someone Still Loves You Boris Yeltsin. It was released through Polyvinyl Records on April 8, 2008.

== Background and production ==
The album's name refers to John J. Pershing Middle School in Springfield, Missouri, which Philip Dickey attended.

The track "HEERS" references the Heers Building which is also located in Springfield, Missouri.

The album's production is more refined than the lo-fi Broom, but retains the doubled vocals, moving bass lines, and clean guitar lines played by electric and acoustic guitars from the former album.

The album is dedicated to the bands' lifelong friend, Alex Bethurem, a Chicago area indie music fan (originally from Springfield, MO), who took his own life.

A pre-order edition of the album featured exclusive original artwork and three bonus tracks. The first two are demo acoustic songs: an early draft of The Beach Song, I Didn't Mean it; and Stain, a cover of the Nirvana song.

== Reception ==
The album received internet buzz as well as favorable online reviews on indie music blogs. Taylor from the music blog Music for Ants said "It’s got that jangly pop that fans have grown to love, and the melodies are still top-notch." One Amazon.com customer review describes it as "Quirky chord changes amid massive hooks and addictive melodies."

On the other side, Pitchfork gave the album a 6.2/10, stating "Pershing is so easy-going it tends to forget trying to be memorable." AllMusic gave Pershing 2.5/5.0 stars, calling it "a boring, careless record that tries too hard to be witty and hooky, resulting in something that resembles the indie-hipster version of the nameless college-guy jam band."

== Track listing ==
1. "Glue Girls" - 3:26
2. "Boring Fountain" - 3:44
3. "Dead Right" - 2:21
4. "The Beach Song" - 2:48
5. "Modern Mystery" - 4:20
6. "Some Constellation" - 3:12
7. "Think I Wanna Die" - 2:49
8. "You Could Write a Book" - 3:13
9. "Oceanographer" - 4:45
10. "HEERS" - 3:26
11. "Doris Tailspin (Boring Mountain)" - 0:56

== Personnel ==
The band members are credited as follows.

- John Robert Cardwell - vocals, guitar, bass, trumpet, belly charms
- Philip Dickey - vocals, guitar, drums, piano
- Jonathan James - drums, bass, guitar, piano, synth, crystals
- Will Knauer - guitar

=== Additional musicians ===
- Brian Azevedo — acoustic guitar on Oceanographer
- Molly Healey — strings on Dead Right
- Becky Thomas — hand claps on Dead Right, cowbell on Glue Girls

== Production ==
- Recorded and mixed by SSLYBY and Jason Spell between March 2007 at Fred's Loft in Wilmington, N.C. and from August to December 2007 in Springfield, MO.
- Engineered by Jonathan James
- Mastered by TW Walsh
