= Sharpen Your Teeth =

Studio album by Ugly Casanova
- Released: May 21, 2002
- Recorded: August 2001; Portland, Oregon; Cottage Grove, Oregon
- Genre: Indie rock, folk rock, psychedelic folk, alternative country, neo-psychedelia, indie folk, gothic country
- Length: 49:55 (CD)
- Label: Sub Pop SP0552
- Producer: Brian Deck

Professional ratings
Review scores
| Source | Rating |
|---|---|
| AllMusic | 4/5 stars |
| Pitchfork Media | 7.3/10 |

Sharpen Your Teeth is the only studio album by the indie rock band Ugly Casanova. Brainchild of Modest Mouse lead singer Isaac Brock, Ugly Casanova was his attempt to try new methods and genres outside the realms of Modest Mouse. The album sees Brock performing on more instruments and using a more stripped down method of recording. The story given is that an eccentric character named Edgar Graham met with Modest Mouse while on tour. During their time together, Graham and the band recorded a few songs together, and Graham completely disappeared. In an attempt to get Graham to resurface, Brock took the recordings to Sub Pop Records, redid them in the studio, and had them released as Sharpen Your Teeth. It has since been revealed that Brock fabricated the story himself, using Ugly Casanova as a method of writing music whilst not being recognized instantly as Modest Mouse.

== Track listing ==
1. "Barnacles" (Isaac Brock, John Orth) - 5:05
2. "Spilled Milk Factory" - 4:26
3. "Parasites" - 3:36
4. "Hotcha Girls" - 4:59
5. "(No Song)" - 0:26
6. "Diamonds on the Face of Evil" - 3:16
7. "Cat Faces" - 3:36
8. "Ice on the Sheets" - 6:33
9. "Bee Sting" - 0:48
10. "Pacifico" - 2:31
11. "Smoke Like Ribbons" - 5:15
12. "Things I Don't Remember" - 3:29
13. "So Long to the Holidays" - 5:56
14. "Baby's Clean Conscience" - 3:15 (2015 Reissue - Bonus Track)
15. "Diggin' Holes" - 3:32 (2015 Reissue - Bonus Track)
16. "They Devised a Plan to Fuck Forever" - 4:27 (2015 Reissue - Bonus Track)
17. "Roads To Go To Roads To Go To..." - 3:09 (2015 Reissue - Bonus Track)

== Personnel ==
According to the liner notes:

- Ugly Casanova (Isaac Brock)
- Tim Rutili
- Pall Jenkins
- John Orth
- Brian Deck
- Tyler Reilly

== 2015 reissue ==
In September 2015, it was announced that Sub Pop would reissue the album on black and limited edition yellow/white vinyl on October 30, along with four bonus tracks and an unreleased track from the album's recording sessions known as "They Devised a Plan to Fuck Forever".
