= Loftus (band) =

American indie rock band

Loftus was an American indie rock band from Chicago, signed to Perishable Records. Consisting of former members of Red Red Meat and Rex, it released only one album in 1998.

== History ==
Loftus was formed out of a proposal by an A&M Records representative to combine the bands Red Red Meat and Rex into a group that would release an experimental album for an A&M subsidiary Treat and Release. A selection of members from both bands recorded with Bundy K. Brown and Brian Deck at the recording studio of Ben Massarella of Perishable Records in August and September 1996. Allmusic reported that the album was written "by putting everyone's names in a hat and then picking out four names at a time to go into the room and come up with a song. The lineups changed, the songs were recorded and the record took shape."

Treat and Release eventually folded before the album was issued, and the recordings were reacquired by Massarella and Tim Rutili, members of Red Red Meat (which disbanded in 1997). Massarella and Rutili re-launched Perishable Records with the release of the Loftus album in 1998. CMJ New Music Monthly described the album as "quietly noisy deconstructed country and blues grooves". The album was a modest financial success for the label, which led to their issuing side projects from several of Loftus's members.

The group did not issue any further material under this name, but the album saw a vinyl reissue on Jealous Butcher Records in 2013. The original CD issue on Perishable and the vinyl reissue on Jealous Butcher were both encased in sandpaper sleeves, which were meant to abrade and damage the covers of the records they sit next to on a shelf.

== Members ==
- Tim Rutili
- Ben Massarella
- Bundy K. Brown
- Doug Scharin
- Brian Deck
- Phil Spirito
- Tim Hurley
- Curtis Harvey

== Discography ==
- Loftus (Perishable Records, 1998)
