= The Ruminant Band =

Studio album by Fruit Bats
- Released: August 4, 2009
- Genre: Folk rock
- Label: Sub Pop
- Producer: Graeme Gibson

Fruit Bats chronology
Spelled in Bones (2005)	The Ruminant Band (2009)	Tripper (2011)

Professional ratings
Review scores
Source	Rating
AllMusic	3.5/5 stars
The A.V. Club	(B+)
Robert Christgau	(A−)
Drowned in Sound	(8/10)
Pitchfork Media	(7.4/10)
PopMatters	(7/10)
Spin	3/5 stars

The Ruminant Band is the fourth album by American folk-rock band Fruit Bats, released on August 4, 2009.

"Primitive Man" was chosen as the Starbucks iTunes Pick of the Week for December 22, 2009.

== Track listing ==
1. "Primitive Man"
2. "The Ruminant Band"
3. "Tegucigalpa"
4. "Beautiful Morning Light"
5. "The Hobo Girl"
6. "Being on Our Own"
7. "My Unusual Friend"
8. "Singing Joy to the World"
9. "The Blessed Breeze"
10. "Feather Bed"
11. "Flamingo"
