= Beau Sorenson =

American record producer and engineer (born 1980)

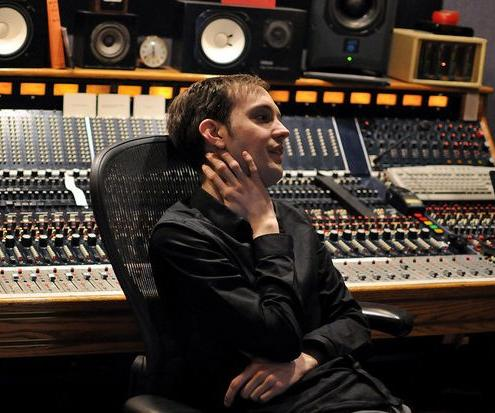
- Beau at Smart Studios in 2009

Background information
- Born: 1980 (age 45–46); Wisconsin, United States
- Genres: Experimental, electronic, ambient, rock, indie rock, indie pop, alternative rock, punk rock, noise music, drone music
- Occupations: Recording engineer, record producer, musician, remixer
- Years active: 2003–present
- Labels: Hometapes, Burger Records, Crash Symbols
- Website: beaunoise.com

Beau Sorenson (born 1980) is an American record producer and engineer. He has worked with Death Cab For Cutie, Bob Mould, Taylor Swift, Superchunk, Sparklehorse, Noah Kahan, Gracie Abrams, Jars of Clay, Yellow Ostrich, The Lonely Forest, Field Report, Someone Still Loves You Boris Yeltsin, and Elsinore. Originally from Wisconsin, Sorenson spent his early career at Smart Studios in Madison, later moving to Portland, Oregon to become an independent producer and engineer. He releases electronic music, collaborations, and remixes under the name Beaunoise, and is a part of "band-like" project, Exurbs.

== Life and career ==
=== Early life ===
Beau Sorenson was born and grew up in northwest Wisconsin. Sorenson took piano and guitar lessons, played in his high school band, and tried his hand playing in a few bands when he was a teenager, but did not take the normal garage band route to becoming a recording engineer. Living in a remote area provided him with space for making much noise taking apart and building all types of electronics, and for experimenting with four-track recorders, synthesizers, and drum machines.

Sorenson attended Wisconsin Indianhead Technical College from 1999 to 2001, obtaining an Associate of Science degree in IT and computer support. Later he moved to Madison to study music recording at Madison Media Institute. About having attended a recording school, Sorenson said, "there are far more people graduating from recording school than there are opportunities. On the other hand, the old model of interning at a studio is becoming extinct, so there isn't a clear path to being a recording person. Has there ever been, though? It's always been a little strange and convoluted. When I worked at Smart, Mike [Zirkel] always said, "You don't choose to make records – it chooses you.""

=== Production career ===
Sorenson began working at Smart Studios in 2004 after one of the other engineers put him in touch with studio manager Mike Zirkel, who convinced him to choose Smart over an internship in Los Angeles. The first album he assisted on was Garbage's Bleed Like Me. "I was running around, getting coffee, cleaning toilets – all the classic studio intern duties," Sorenson said. "I was so nervous, but really excited at the same time. And I really loved that place, too: I'd find any excuse to stay late, to hang out, whatever I could just to be there. [...] Eventually, I started working on my own projects, but I'd still assist on bigger projects that came through. This was a great way to learn how to (and how not to) make a record, and I avoided a lot of pitfalls by watching and helping other people struggle through them." While at Smart, he worked with bands like Death Cab For Cutie, Sparklehorse, Garbage, Tegan and Sara, Someone Still Loves You Boris Yeltsin, The Ericksons, Mr. Gnome, Cougar, Hotel Lights, and Pale Young Gentlemen. During his time at Smart, Sorenson was also an instructor at Madison Media Institute from 2008 to May 2010, teaching audio engineering classes.

When Smart Studios closed in 2010, Sorenson decided to go freelance and move to Portland, Oregon. He shifted most of his equipment to portable options (like the Studer 169 console) so he could bring his studio wherever the bands wanted to go, including more secluded locations like cabins, houses, churches, or barns. As a freelance engineer, he has recorded and mixed at: Alberta Court, April Base, Avast!, Black Door Studio, Chrome Attic, Different fur, Electrical Audio, Flora Recording, Hall of Justice, Hyde Street, Jackpot!, London Bridge, Overdub Lane, Pogo, Soma, Sound City, Tiny Telephone, The Tannery, The Warehouse, Two Sticks, and Type Foundry.

=== Beaunoise ===
Sorenson also produces electronic music, collaborates with others, and creates remixes, which he releases under the moniker Beaunoise. This work serves as a laboratory for exploring and inventing new techniques and processes that can be used in his work as an engineer. In 2013, he gathered a number of his remixes, including some created with Clive Tanaka, into a cassette album entitled Remixes, which was then released on label Crash Symbols. All three of his Ambient series were released on Burger Records, with Ambient One and Ambient Three (which was released April 23, 2014) being lighter works than "dark droney" Ambient Two. Though Beaunoise pieces are generally not performed live for audiences, Sorenson did perform some works live as Beaunoise on February 19, 2013, at the Experimental Portland Showcase.

=== Exurbs ===
Exurbs is a "band-like" project of drone and krautrock-inspired instrumental music that Sorenson started with friends Jeff Sauer (Czarbles), and Andrew Fitzpatrick (All Tiny Creatures, Volcano Choir). Their first cassette was recorded over a year and a half at Smart Studios and was released in 2011 by label Zod Records. August 2013, they began recording of their second album at April Base in Fall Creek, Wisconsin.

== Discography ==
=== Producer/engineer/mixer/songwriter ===
==== Selected credits ====
- Beaunoise, Buchlaworks: Module 1 (2016) – Production, Writer, Artist
- Beaunoise, Pianoworks (2016) – Production, Writer, Artist
- Beaunoise, equipment and personnel (2015) – Production, Writer, Artist
- Beaunoise, H3000 (2015) – Production, Writer, Artist
- Beaunoise, Satieworks (2015) – Production, Writer, Artist
- Beaunoise, Rainforest 4060 (For David Tudor) (2015) – Production, Writer, Artist
- Beaunoise, Ambient Three (2014) – Production, Writer, Artist
- Beaunoise, Remixes (2013) – Production, Writer, Artist
- Beaunoise, Ambient Two (2012) – Production, Writer, Artist
- Leisure, "Green Light" single (Clive Tanaka & Beaunoise remix) (2012) – Production, Writer, Artist
- Love Hacking (documentary short) (2011) – Music composer
- Beaunoise, You Never Close Your Lips When I Kiss Your Eyes (2011) – Production, Writer, Artist
- Beaunoise, Beeptunes (2011) – Production, Writer, Artist
- Beaunoise, Ambient One (2011) – Production, Writer, Artist
- Exurbs, Exurbs (2011) – Production, Writer, Artist
- Clive Tanaka y su orquesta, Jet Set Siempre 1° (2011) – Miembro de la Orquesta
- Groundislava, "Panorama" single (Clive Tanaka and Beaunoise remix) (2011) – Production, Writer, Artist
- The New Wrecking Crew, "I Got You For Christmas" single (2007) – Writer, Piano, Rhythm guitar, Non-tubular bells
- Noah Kahan/Gracie Abrams, "Everywhere, Everything" single (2023) – recording engineer
- Taylor Swift, "The Smallest Man Who Ever Lived" (2024) – recording engineer

=== Other credits ===
==== Music video appearances ====
- Mike Krol, "La La La" (2015) – self
- Pony Village, "120 Days" (2013) – self
- Bob Mould, "The Descent" (2012) – office worker
- The Ericksons, "Where Do You Dwell" (2012) – self
- The Ericksons, "Gone Blind" (2012) – self
- Yellow Ostrich, "Whale" (2011) – torch bearer
