= Brian Deck =

American musician and producer

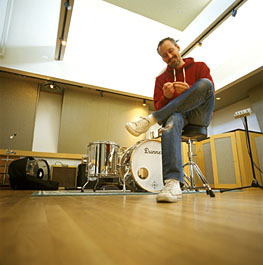
- Deck in the Studio

Background information
- Born: Chicago, Illinois
- Occupations: Musician, recording engineer
- Instruments: Drums, percussion
- Years active: 1988 to present
- Formerly of: Red Red Meat; Califone; Ugly Casanova; Loftus

Brian Deck is an American music producer and member of the band Red Red Meat. He co-founded Idful Music Corporation in 1988. Since becoming a full-time producer, Deck has worked with bands and artists including Modest Mouse, Iron & Wine, Califone, All Smiles, Fruit Bats, Gomez, The Grates, Holopaw, Baby & Hide, David Singer and David Berkeley. Brian currently works at Narwhal Studios (formerly Engine Studios) in Chicago.

== Musician ==
Brian Deck attended college as a performance major and excelled at both drum set and general percussion instruments. On many of the albums Deck produces, he contributes to some sort of instrument or vocal parts. Many of his albums include extensive percussion instruments and techniques. While recording the band Red Red Meat at Idful Studios, he was asked to join the band behind the kit. He remained there until the bands disbanding in early 2000. Since then he has had a loose connection with Tim Rutili's Califone. He and Tim also collaborated with Modest Mouse frontman Isaac Brock for the band Ugly Casanova. Deck produced and played drums on their sole album, Sharpen Your Teeth; he also toured behind the record. According to Richard Edwards of Margot and the Nuclear So and So's, as of 2009, Deck was the new drummer in his side project Vegetables.

== Producer ==
Working early on out of Idful Studios with Brad Wood and later out of Engine Studios, Deck has produced a number of both local Chicago musicians as well as widely known international acts. He is represented exclusively by Andy Kipnes and Mark Beaven of Advanced Alternative Media.

== Discography ==
Red Red Meat

- Red Red Meat (Perishable Records, 1992)
- Jimmywine Majestic (Sub Pop Records, 1994)
- Bunny Gets Paid (Sub Pop Records, 1995)
- There's a Star Above the Manger Tonight (Sub Pop Records, 1997)
- Loftus (collaboration with Rex) (Perishable Records, 1999)

Ugly Casanova

- Diggin Holes b/w Babys Clean Conscience (Sub Pop Records, 2002)
- Sharpen Your Teeth (Sub Pop Records, 2002)

== Production credits ==
Year	Album	Artist
2025	Butter Miracle, The Complete Sweets!	Counting Crows
2021	Butter Miracle, Suite One	Counting Crows
2020	Breach	Fenne Lily
2015	The Horse Comanche	Chadwick Stokes
2014	Somewhere Under Wonderland	Counting Crows
2013	Intersections	Into It. Over It.
2013	Ghost on Ghost	Iron & Wine
2013	The Great Despiser	Joe Pug
2012	Clill Blanzin	Moritat
2012	Don't Let the Sun Go Down on Your Anger	River City Extension
2011	This Life is Not Ours to Keep	New Ruins
2011	Collider	Sam Roberts Band
2011	No One Gets Any	Fair Fjola
2010	Li(f)e	Sage Francis
2010	In Memory of Loss	Nathaniel Rateliff
2009	A New Tide	Gomez
2009	New Leaves	Owen
2009	Strange Light	David Berkeley
2008	Animal!	Margot and the Nuclear So and So's
2008	Not Animal	Margot and the Nuclear So and So's
2008	Saturday Nights & Sunday Mornings	Counting Crows
2008	Unicycle Loves You	Unicycle Loves You
2008	Live at Dead Lake	Hot Club de Paris
2007	The Shepherd's Dog	Iron and Wine
2007	Sons of Guns	Probably Vampires
2007	Banging Down the Door	Ezra Furman and the Harpoons
2006	This Harness Can't Ride Anything	Chin up Chin Up
2006	Roots & Crowns	Califone
2006	Gravity Won't Get You High	The Grates
2006	For The Masses	The You
2006	The Animal Years	Josh Ritter
2005	The Plural of the Choir	Settlefish
2005	That These Things Could Be Ours	Robert Skoro
2004	Our Endless Numbered Days	Iron and Wine
2004	Hark/Sigh	Baby & Hide
2004	Stars Burn Out	David Singer & the Sweet Science
2003	Mouthfuls	Fruitbats
2003	Holopaw	Holopaw
2003	Fear Not The Breakdown	R. D. Roth and The Issues
2002	September 000	The Secret Machines
2002	Sharpen Your Teeth	Ugly Casanova
2002	The Silver Line	Chris Mills
2002	Inhabiting the Ball	Jim Roll
2001	Everywhere and His Nasty Parlour Tricks	Modest Mouse
2001	Roomsound	Califone
2000	The Moon and Antarctica	Modest Mouse
1997	There's a Star Above the Manger Tonight	Red Red Meat
1992	Baling Wire & Bubble Gum	Every Good Boy
1990	Social Graces	Every Good Boy
1988	Mederios	Wheat (Band)
