= Perishable Records =

Independent record label based in Chicago

Perishable Records is an independent record label founded by Chicago musicians Ben Massarella and Tim Rutili in 1993. Rutili and Massarella were both members of Red Red Meat at the time, and released the band's "Hot Nikkity Truck Monkey" as its first single. The band was almost immediately after signed to Sub Pop, but after Red Red Meat broke up in 1997, the pair revived the label name and began releasing new material on it. Its first release after the dissolution of the Sub Pop contract was an album by Loftus, released in 1998. Perishable's recording studio initially was a renovated first-floor apartment in Chicago, and musicians recorded to 2-inch analog audiotape before moving on to processing using the digital audio workstation ProTools. The label's offices, in 1999, were in a truck wash in south Chicago that doubled as the office for Massarella's side business, BJ Transportation Service. In 2002, the label lost some of its flagship acts - The Fire Show had broken up, and Fruit Bats had signed with Sub Pop - and Massarella and Rutili openly talked about potentially winding down its operation. However, by 2003, the label was operating out of an erstwhile elementary school in the Pilsen neighborhood, where the group had also outfitted a studio it dubbed Clava. Clava was located in a converted garage next to the school, was financed by Massarella, and was operated by Brian Deck of Red Red Meat.

Some artists on the label include Califone, HiM, Joan of Arc, oRSo, Red Red Meat, Loftus, The Fire Show, Sin Ropas, and Fruit Bats.

== See also ==
- List of record labels
