= Holopaw =

American indie band

- Origin: Gainesville, Florida
- Genres: Indie rock
- Years active: 2001–present
- Label: Misra Records / Sub Pop / Bakery Outlet Records / Obscurist Press / Wild Kindness Records
- Members: John Orth; Patrick Quinney; Matt Radick; Jeff McMullen; Ryan Quinney
- Past members: Michael Johnson; Beachwolf Gensemer; Tobi Echevarria; Jeff Hays

Holopaw is an American indie band from Gainesville, Florida. The band was named after the town of Holopaw in Osceola County, Florida, although none of the band's members have ever lived there. One of its members, John Orth, collaborated with Modest Mouse frontman Isaac Brock and others in 2002 to release the album Sharpen Your Teeth under the band name Ugly Casanova. Another member, Michael Johnson (Ape School), went on to join Kurt Heasley's Lilys.

== History ==
John Orth and Jeff Hays played as a duo for some time before joining Michael Johnson, Ryan Gensemer, and Tobi Echevarria as Holopaw for the first two albums. Johnson, Gensemer, and Echevarria relocated to Philadelphia. Holopaw now consists of Orth, Patrick Quinney, Jeff McMullen, Matt Radick, and Ryan Quinney.

- "depending on when you ask us Holopaw is or has been or will be somewhere on the continuum of nothing-comic adaptation-songwriting duo-play a sometime show duo-long distance recordation-actual record-recording rock band-actual touring rock band with shows in different towns that people come to and everything....right now we’re around the actual recording touring rock band end of that spectrum....well maybe not touring but we’re working on getting back to that...."

The band's fourth studio album, Academy Songs, Volume I, received a 5.8 rating from Pitchfork, which noted, "There's no big reveal, no twist, no run through the woods-- no sense of epiphany or conclusion. Instead, the album simply flickers out like a candle, with the faint promise of another visit to this setting."

== Members ==
- John Orth - Vocals/Artwork
- Jeff Hays - Guitars/Pedal Steel/Vocals
- Patrick Quinney - Guitars
- Matt Radick - Keyboards/Cello/Guitars
- Jeff McMullen - Bass
- Ryan Quinney - Drums

== Discography ==
=== Studio albums ===
- Holopaw (Subpop, January 21, 2003)
- Quit +/or Fight (Subpop, August 9, 2005)
- Oh, Glory. Oh, Wilderness. (Bakery Outlet / Obscurist Press, November 24, 2009)
- Academy Songs, Volume 1 (Misra, January 15, 2013)
