= Red Red Meat =

Rock band

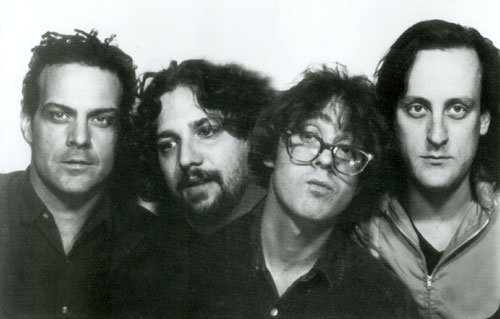
- Red Red Meat in 1993

Background information
- Origin: Chicago, Illinois, United States
- Genres: Indie rock, blues rock
- Years active: 1990–1997
- Labels: Sub Pop, Perishable Records
- Past members: Tim Rutili; Glynis Johnson; Brian Deck; Glenn Girard; Tim Hurley; Ben Massarella; John Rowan

Red Red Meat was a 1990s Chicago-area blues-influenced alternative rock band. After their break-up, frontman Tim Rutili went on to form Califone, for which many of Red Red Meat's former members, including percussionist Ben Massarella, often record and perform. Tim Hurley went on to form Sin Ropas.

== History ==
In 1984, Tim Rutili moved from the suburb of Addison, IL to Chicago in order to attend film school, where he met bassist Glynis Johnson. Together with Ben Massarella, their first band, Friends of Betty, attracted a reasonable following. The 1988 studio album Blind Faith II included drummer John Rowan. It was not much of a success.

With new recruit Glenn Girard they renamed the band Red Red Meat. The band's name possibly came from Ben's truck washing business which cleaned meat carrying trucks on their way out of Chicago. Regarding the band name, Tim Rutili said in an interview: "I think we just thought it sounded good."

Red Red Meat released their first single, "Hot Nikkety Trunk Monkey" b/w "Snowball" in 1991. They were recorded with Brad Wood at Idful Studios in Chicago. Engineer Brian Deck, who recorded the drums for the session, was asked to become a full-time member behind the kit, after the departure of Ben Massarella, who left for a job as a studio musician.

It was during the recordings at Idful Studios with Brad Wood that Sub Pop director Jonathan Poneman decided to sign the band making them the first Chicago band on the label. During the summer of 1992, Red Red Meat toured with fellow Chicago group The Smashing Pumpkins. Glynis Johnson left the band after ending a romance between her and Rutili after the tour. Johnson would later contract AIDS and pass away due to complications that fall. The Smashing Pumpkins wrote a song "Glynis" as a tribute, which was released on No Alternative compilation. Sub Pop released Red Red Meat's second album in early 1994, Jimmywine Majestic. It was a step away from the grunge and general label characteristics of Sub Pop but was generally well received. Massarella returned, instead of replacing Brian Deck on drums, began employing his "batterie" techniques. In 1995 Red Red Meat returned with Bunny Gets Paid, which, according to Sub Pop, "is easily one of the high points of the entire Sub Pop catalog." In 1997 Red Red Meat released their final album, There's a Star Above the Manger Tonight.

Red Red Meat has since ended their contract with Sub Pop. They appeared in Scott Petersen's film Out of the Loop, which documents the Chicago indie rock scene. RRM's own Perishable label released Loftus in 1999, a collaboration with New York trio, Rex. Red Red Meat has since disbanded and each member has moved on to other projects. Tim Rutili along with several other Red Red Meat alumni founded Califone, a project in which all Red Red Meat members have participated at one point or another. Brian Deck currently is a music producer based in Chicago.

== Reunion ==
Though the band has never gone through an official break-up, there have been several reunions throughout the years. In 2008 they returned for two shows, at the Hideout in Chicago and at the Sub Pop 25th Anniversary party. Talks of a possible album were thrown about, though nothing has developed and all Red Red Meat members have returned to their full-time positions.

Red Red Meat played three shows in March 2009: two in Chicago followed by an appearance at the Sub Pop showcase at South by Southwest in Austin, TX.

On March 24, 2009, Sub Pop released a deluxe edition of 1995's Bunny Gets Paid, which had been out of print for some years. It features a 7-track second disc with a previously unreleased song, "St. Anthony's Jawbone."

== Discography ==
- Red Red Meat (Perishable Records, 1992)
- Jimmywine Majestic (Sub Pop Records, 1994)
- Bunny Gets Paid (Sub Pop Records, 1995)
- There's a Star Above the Manger Tonight (Sub Pop Records, 1997)
