= Rex (band) =

American indie rock band

- Origin: Brooklyn, New York, United States
- Genres: Slowcore, sadcore, indie rock
- Years active: 1994 – 1999; 2022 – present
- Labels: The Numero Group, Southern Records, Perishable Records
- Members: Doug Scharin; Curtis Harvey; Phil Spirito; Rob King
- Past members: Kirsten McCord; Mike Billingsley

Rex is an American indie rock band formed in 1994 (though an early version of the band was formed in 1991). Rex was considered one of the most important and influential slowcore bands and released three albums and one EP on Southern Records, as well as a collaboration with Red Red Meat (under the name Loftus) on Perishable Records. Members included Doug Scharin (who was also a member of Codeine, HiM, and June of 44), Curtis Harvey (Pullman), and Phil Spirito (Orso).

== Discography ==
=== Albums ===
- rex (1995)
- rex C (1996)
- 3 (1997)

=== EPs ===
- Waltz (1996)

=== Collaborations ===
- Loftus (with Red Red Meat) (1999)
