= Forest Fire (band) =

American experimental rock band

Forest Fire is an experimental rock band from New York City led by songwriter/vocalist Mark Thresher (Augsburger). Band members include Natalie Stormann (synthesizer/multi instrumentalist), Galen Bremer (bass/multi instrumentalist) and Robert Pounding (drums).

The band's debut album Survival was first released on Catbird Records in June 2008 then later on Infinite Best in 2009

Uncut described the album as “An exercise in urban folk with art-punk underpinnings… Lyrically sharp, but musically savvy too.”

Drowned in Sound described the album's songs as "of the most universal of human themes - of sex and death, of triumph and frustration, of joy and of fury – deconstructed and expressed in the most understated of fashions."

Their second album Staring At The X was released on 17 October 2011 on FatCat Records.

On October 17, 2011, Forest Fire's "Staring At The X' received a 7.1 rating from the indie website Pitchfork Media. Pitchfork stated that "Staring at the X proves them to be a commendably ambitious band with the chops to carry out even their most far-flung ideas."

== Discography ==
Albums

- Survival (June 26, 2008)
- Staring At The X (17 October 2011)
- "Screens" (September 10, 2013)
