= Ben Massarella =

American percussionist and drummer

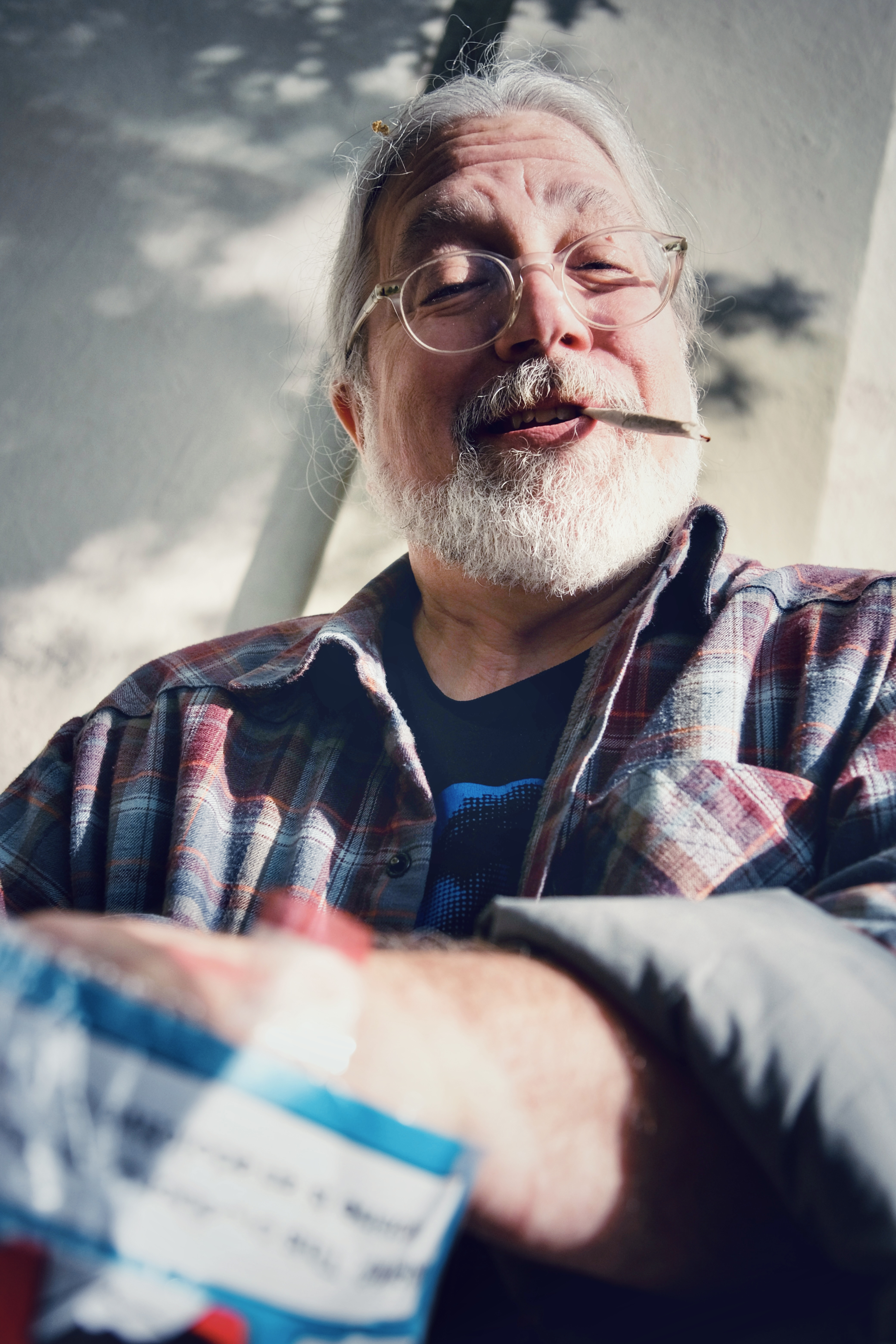

Background information
- Instruments: Percussion; drums
- Member of: Califone and Modest Mouse
- Formerly of: Red Red Meat; Loftus; Orso

Ben Massarella is an American percussionist and drummer. He is a member of Califone and Modest Mouse, a former member of Red Red Meat, Loftus, and Orso, and co-founded Perishable Records with Tim Rutili in 1993.

He contributed percussion to Modest Mouse's 2000 album The Moon & Antarctica, 2015 album Strangers to Ourselves, 2021 album The Golden Casket, and 2026 album An Eraser and a Maze. He has consistently toured with the band since 2014. Previously, Massarella toured for many years with Iron & Wine and contributed percussion to the 2011 album Kiss Each Other Clean.
