= Roots & Crowns =

Studio album by Califone
- Released: October 10, 2006
- Recorded: October 2005 – May 2006
- Genres: Post-rock, folk, experimental
- Label: Thrill Jockey (thrill 163)

Califone chronology
Everybody's Mother Vol. 1 (2005)	Roots & Crowns (2006)	All My Friends Are Funeral Singers (2009)

Roots & Crowns is the sixth studio album by American indie rock band Califone. It was released on October 10, 2006, on Thrill Jockey.

The LP version of the album contains different artwork. The song "The Orchids" is a cover of the Psychic TV song of the same name.

== Reception ==
Professional ratings
Aggregate scores
Source	Rating
Metacritic	77/100
Review scores
Source	Rating
AllMusic	4.5/5 stars
The Boston Phoenix	3/4 stars
The Irish Times	4/5 stars
Now	4/5
Pitchfork	8.7/10
Spin	3/5 stars
Stylus Magazine	A−
Uncut	4/5 stars

Pitchfork placed Roots & Crowns at number 168 on its list of top 200 albums of the 2000s.

== Track listing ==
No.	Title	Length
1.	"Pink & Sour"	4:13
2.	"Spider's House"	3:47
3.	"Sunday Noises"	2:50
4.	"The Eye You Lost in the Crusades"	4:42
5.	"A Chinese Actor"	4:18
6.	"Our Kitten Sees Ghosts"	2:47
7.	"Alice Crawley"	0:37
8.	"The Orchids"	2:55
9.	"Burned by the Christians"	3:55
10.	"Black Metal Valentine"	6:16
11.	"Rose Petal Ear"	2:09
12.	"3 Legged Animals"	4:08
13.	"If You Would"	5:43
Total length:		48:19
