= All My Friends Are Funeral Singers =

Studio album by Califone
- Released: October 6, 2009
- Genre: Post-rock
- Label: Dead Oceans (DOC028)

Califone chronology
Roots & Crowns (2006)	All My Friends Are Funeral Singers (2009)

Professional ratings
Review scores
Source	Rating
AllMusic	4/5 stars
BBC	favorable
CHARTattack	4/5 stars
Drowned in Sound	(7/10)
Dusted	favorable
NME	(8/10)
Paste	(85%)
Pitchfork Media	(8.1/10)
The Sunday Times	4/5 stars

All My Friends Are Funeral Singers is a 2009 album by Califone. The album was the first release by Califone on Dead Oceans. The 2LP version of the album contains a bonus track, called "Lunar H", on side 4. The track Buñuel is biographical of Spanish filmmaker Luis Buñuel.

== Track listing ==
1. "Giving Away the Bride" - 6:26
2. "Polish Girls" - 3:04
3. "1928" - 4:29
4. "Funeral Singers" - 4:09
5. "Snake's Tooth = Protection Against Fever and Luck in Gambling" - 0:37
6. "Buñuel" - 4:25
7. "Ape-Like" - 2:22
8. "A Wish Made While Burning Onions Will Come True" - 0:43
9. "Evidence" - 5:02
10. "Alice Marble Gray" - 3:42
11. "Salt" - 2:52
12. "Krill" - 6:10
13. "Seven, Fourteen, or Twenty-One Knots" - 1:22
14. "Better Angels" - 4:08
