= Tim Rutili =

American singer-songwriter

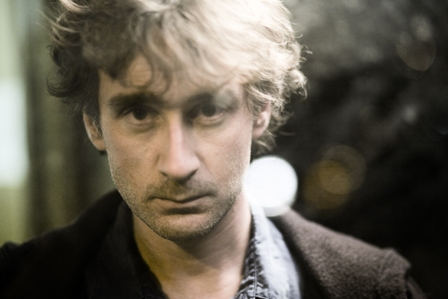
- Tim Rutili in 2004

Background information
- Born: 1967/1968; Chicago, Illinois
- Occupations: Musician; composer; filmmaker
- Instruments: Vocals; guitar; keyboards
- Years active: 1988 to present
- Labels: Sub Pop; Jealous Butcher; Dead Oceans; Perishable Records; Thrill Jockey; Dangerbird

Tim Rutili (born 1967 or 1968) is an American musician, filmmaker, and visual artist. He is best known as the founder of Red Red Meat and Califone, and his membership in supergroups Ugly Casanova and Loftus.

== Career ==
He was the founder and principal songwriter for Califone and Red Red Meat. He is a member of the Indie rock supergroup Ugly Casanova, which included Modest Mouse singer Isaac Brock, producer and former Red Red Meat bandmate Brian Deck, and others. He is a frequent collaborator of Michael Krassner and Boxhead ensemble. He appeared on Joan of Arc's album Guitar Duets, performing a duet with Jeremy Boyle and Modest Mouse's Everywhere and His Nasty Parlour Tricks and The Moon & Antarctica.

Over twenty-five years, Rutili contributed to many albums by a diverse group of artists as a multi-instrumentalist, vocalist and songwriter. He has composed and collaborated on music for television, documentary and feature films, including Beauty is Embarrassing, a PBS documentary about artist, designer and puppeteer, Wayne White and The Calling, a four hour PBS series exploring faith and religion. His feature film work includes Here, Wellness, The Lost. Brawler and 2022's Monstrous. He collaborated with Michael Krassner on the score for Braden King’s feature film The Evening Hour. He made contributions to the soundtracks for; Boss, Hannibal, The Vow, Stranger Than Fiction, Monogamy, 30 Days of Night, The Dinner, and Waterloo Road.

Rutili has performed worldwide and provided musical scores to numerous films and curated programs including Early Abstractions by Harry Smith at Images Film Festival in Toronto, as a member of Boxhead Ensemble at Doclands Film Festival in Dublin, Stories, Maps and Notes from the Half Light- live, and improvised scores to short films by Jem Cohen, Laura Moya, Braden King, Grant Gee, Paula Froehle, Gustav Deutch and Barbara Meter. God Builds Like Frank Lloyd Wright: Califone and the Animated Films of Brent Green at Sundance, and Braden King’s HERE (The Story Sleeps) at Sundance and MoMA. Most recently, he scored Brent Green’s A Brief Spark Bookended by Darkness at FestivAll at the Clay Center in Charleston, WV.

Rutili wrote and directed his first feature-length film All My Friends Are Funeral Singers in tandem with the creation of Califone's eponymous album. The film was accepted for the 2010 Sundance Film Festival. The film screened with a live musical score at Sundance, SXSW, IFC center in New York, MCA in Chicago, and other festivals, museums, and theaters. He has directed short films and music videos for musicians and bands, including Veruca Salt, Iron & Wine, David Yow, Califone, Bill Fay and many others.

== Personal life ==
Rutili was born in Chicago and grew up in Addison, Illinois. He was in a long-term relationship with bassist and musical collaborator Glynis Johnson, until her death from AIDS-related complications in 1992. He is married to Angela Bettis.

== Select Discography ==
Friends of Betty

- Blind Faith II

Red Red Meat

- Red Red Meat (Perishable Records, 1992)
- Jimmywine Majestic (Sub Pop Records, 1994)
- Bunny Gets Paid (Sub Pop Records, 1995)
- There's a Star Above the Manger Tonight (Sub Pop Records, 1997)

Loftus (collaboration with Rex) (Perishable Records, 1999)

Califone

- Califone (Flydaddy Records, 1998)
- Califone (Road Cone Records, 2000)
- Roomsound (Perishable Records, 2001)
- Sometimes Good Weather Follows Bad People (Perishable Records / Road Cone Records, 2002)
- Deceleration One (Perishable Records, 2002)
- Quicksand / Cradlesnakes (Thrill Jockey, 2003)
- Deceleration Two (Perishable Records, 2003)
- Heron King Blues (Thrill Jockey, 2004)
- Roots & Crowns (Thrill Jockey, October 10, 2006)
- All My Friends Are Funeral Singers (Dead Oceans, 2009)
- Stitches (Dead Oceans, 2013)
- Insect Courage EP (Future Oak 2016)
- Echo Mine (Jealous Butcher Records, 2020)
- Villagers (Jealous Butcher Records, 2023)

Ugly Casanova

- Diggin Holes b/w Babys Clean Conscience (Sub Pop Records, 2002)
- Sharpen Your Teeth (Sub Pop Records, 2002)

Tim Rutili & Craig Ross

- Guitars Tuned To Air Conditioners (Jealous Butcher 2016)
- 10 Seconds To Collapse (Jealous Butcher 2018)

Tim Rutili Arthur King Presents Tim Rutili (Arroyo) Abstractions (Dangerbird 2018)

Boxhead Ensemble

- The Unseen Hand: Music For Documentary Film (Hired Hand 2014)
- Ancient Music (Meno Mosso 2016)
- Here: Chicago Sessions (Hired Hand 2017)

Soundtrack and Compilation Albums

- Stranger Than Fiction (Original Motion Picture Soundtrack) (Sony Music Soundtrax 2006)
- Brian Reitzell - 30 Days Of Night (Original Motion Picture Soundtrack) (Ipecac 2007)
- Brian Reitzell - Boss (Original Television Soundtrack) (Lakeshore Records 2013)
- Brian Reitzell - Watch Dogs (Video Game Soundtrack) (Ubisoft/Invada 2014)
- The Hired Hands: A Tribute To Bruce Langhorne (Scissor Tail 2017)

=== Session Musician ===
- Modest Mouse - The Moon and Antarctica (Epic, 2000)
- Modest Mouse - Everywhere and His Nasty Parlor Tricks (Epic, 2001)
- Sage Francis - Li(f)e (Anti, 2010)
- Margot & the Nuclear So and So's - Buzzard (Mariel, 2010)
- Anna Ternheim - A Space for Lost Time (2019)
