= Calexico discography =

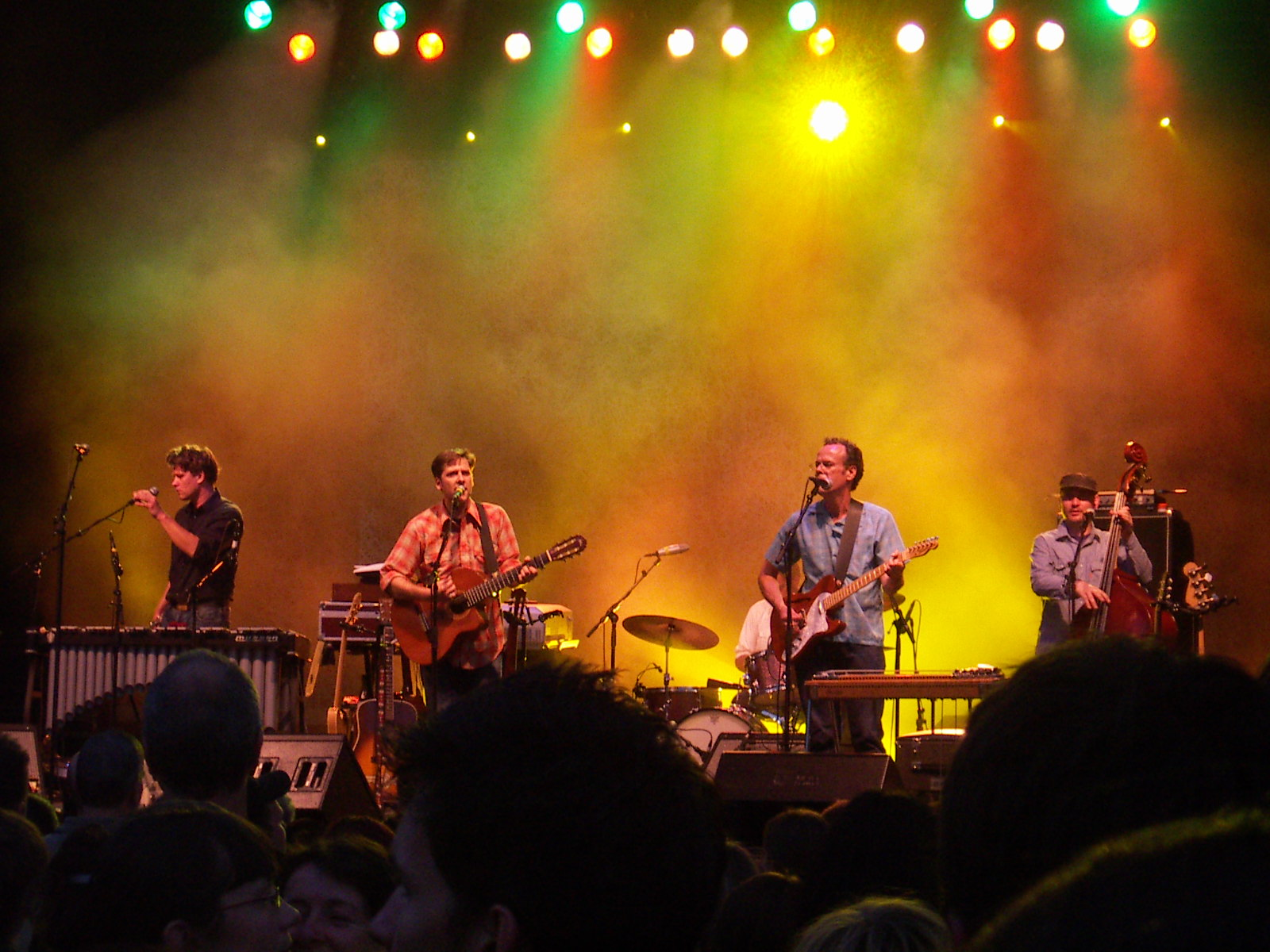
Calexico performing in 2007

This is the discography for American rock band Calexico.

== Studio albums ==
Title	Details	Peak chart positions									
Title	Details	US	AUT	BEL	FRA	GER	NL	NOR	SWE	SWI	UK
Spoke	Released: August 7, 1997; Label: Quarterstick, Hausmusik; Formats: CD, CS, LP	—	—	—	—	—	—	—	—	—	—
The Black Light	Released: May 19, 1998; Label: Quarterstick; Formats: CD, CS, LP	—	—	—	—	—	—	—	—	—	— (Note: The Black Light did not enter the UK Albums Chart, but peaked at number 16 on the UK Record Store Chart.)
Aerocalexico	Released: 1999; Label: Quarterstick / Our Soil, Our Strength; Formats: CD, double vinyl, DI	—	—	—	—	—	—	—	—	—	—
Hot Rail	Released: May 9, 2000; Label: Quarterstick; Formats: CD, CS, LP	—	—	—	—	43	—	—	—	43	57
Feast of Wire	Released: February 18, 2003; Label: Quarterstick; Formats: CD, CS, LP	— (Note: Light Verse did not enter the Billboard 200, but peaked at number 45 on the US Heatseekers chart.)	22	30	39	10	41	18	—	41	71
Garden Ruin	Released: April 11, 2006; Label: Quarterstick; Formats: CD, CS, LP	156	18	21	90	24	36	34	34	62	76
Carried to Dust	Released: September 9, 2008; Label: Quarterstick; Formats: CD, CS, LP	98	24	16	40	18	29	17	31	35	55
Algiers	Released: September 11, 2012; Label: Anti-; Formats: CD, CS, LP	72	6	22	46	13	18	24	22	11	60
Edge of the Sun	Released: April 14, 2015; Label: Anti-; Formats: CD, LP	193	4	15	70	6	10	—	42	4	37
The Thread That Keeps Us	Released: January 26, 2018; Label: Anti-; Formats: CD, LP	— (Note: Light Verse did not enter the Billboard 200, but peaked at number 53 on the US Top Album Sales chart.)	9	13	108	7	21	—	—	12	58
Years to Burn (with Iron & Wine)	Released: June 14, 2019; Label: Sub Pop; Formats: CD	— (Note: Years to Burn did not enter the Billboard 200, but peaked at number 51 on the US Top Album Sales chart.)	13	38	179	16	55	—	—	46	— (Note: Years to Burn did not enter the UK Albums Chart, but peaked at number 42 on the UK Album Sales Chart.)
Seasonal Shift	Released: December 4, 2020; Label: Anti-; Formats: CD, LP	—	34	55	—	51	—	—	—	74	— (Note: Seasonal Shift did not enter the UK Albums Chart, but peaked at number 11 on the UK Record Store Chart.)
El Mirador	Released: April 8, 2022; Label: Anti-; Formats: CD, LP, digital	—	7	26	—	10	58	—	—	15	— (Note: El Mirador did not enter the UK Albums Chart, but peaked at number 17 on the UK Album Sales Chart.)
"—" denotes a recording that did not chart or was not released in that territory.

== Live albums ==
Year	Details
2002	Scraping (Mostly Recorded at the Great American Music Hall San Francisco Jan 11 2002): Label: Lunada Bay (BMI) / Good Clean Dirt (BMI) / Quarterstick Records; Formats: Tour CD, Vinyl
2004	World Drifts In (Recorded at the Barbican, London. November 27, 2002): Label: Lunada Bay (BMI) / Our Soil, Our Strength; Formats: CD, LP, DVD
2005	The Book and the Canal (Studio & Live, Recorded between 1999 and 2005): Label: Lunada Bay (BMI) / Our Soil, Our Strength / Quarterstick Records; Formats: Tour CD, Double Vinyl
2006	Itunes Live Sessions - EP: Label: None / iTunes; Format: Itune Download
2008	Ancienne Belgique (Live in Brussels 2008): Label: Our Soil, Our Strength / Quarterstick Records; Formats: Tour CD, Double Vinyl
2013	Ancienne Belgique vol.2 (Live in Brussels sept 19th 2012): Label: Our Soil, Our Strength; Formats: CD, Double Vinyl
2012/2013	Spiritoso (Record Store Day exclusive of German performances, 2012): Label: City Slang, Anti / Epitaph; Formats: Vinyl, LP, CD, Digital, Album+RE; Details: German performances with the Radio Symphonieorchester Wien and Deutsches Filmorchester Babelsberg

== Soundtracks ==
- Committed (Soundtrack) CD (2000)
- Circo (Soundtrack) CD & Vinyl (2010)
- The Guard (Soundtrack) CD & Vinyl (2011)

== Tour only and miscellaneous albums ==
- 98–99 Road Map (1999), tour CD
- Travelall (2000), tour CD & Vinyl (2012)
- Tête à Tête (2001), side project as ABBC with Amor Belhom Duo
- Tool Box (2007), tour CD
- Festin D'Aden * Elysee Montmartre, Paris * March 08, 2001 (2008), 2xCDr limited to 50 copies
- Selections From Road Atlas- 1998-2011 (2011), Tour CD

== EPs ==
- Underworld D-Tales Vol. 7 (1999)
- Descamino (2000)
- Even My Sure Things Fall Through (2001)
- Convict Pool (2004)
- Live in the KFJC Pit (2004), 7″ split single with Camper Van Beethoven
- In the Reins (2005), with Iron & Wine
- Live Session EP (2006)
- Maybe On Monday (2013), Tour CD & 12" Vinyl

== Singles ==
Title	Year	Peak chart positions								Album
Title	Year	US AAA	BEL Tip	NL	NOR	POL	SCO	UK	UK Indie	Album
"Spark" / "The Ride"	1996	—	—	—	—	—	—	—	—	Non-album singles
"Lacquer" / "Drape"	1996	—	—	—	—	—	—	—	—	Non-album singles
"Stray"	1998	—	—	—	—	—	—	—	—	The Black Light
"The Ride (Pt 2)"	1998	—	—	—	—	—	—	151	35	The Black Light
"Service & Repair"	2000	—	—	—	—	—	—	182	43	Hot Rail
"Crystal Frontier"	2000	—	—	—	—	—	—	89	15	Hot Rail
"Ballad of Cable Hogue"	2000	—	—	—	—	—	—	97	17	Hot Rail
"Clothes Of Sand" / "New Partner" (split single with The Frames)	2001	—	—	—	—	—	—	—	—	Non-album single
"Alone Again Or"	2003	—	—	—	—	—	—	—	—	Convict Pool
"Quattro (World Drifts In)"	2003	—	—	53	—	—	—	135	32	Feast of Wire
"Black Heart"	2004	—	—	—	17	—	—	—	—	Feast of Wire
"Cruel"	2006	—	—	—	—	—	—	185	—	Garden Ruin
"Bisbee Blue"	2006	—	—	—	—	—	—	—	29	Garden Ruin
"The Guns of Brixton" / "Interior of a Dutch House" (split single with Beirut)	2006	—	—	—	—	—	93	177	—	Non-album singles
"Dark Eyes" (with Iron & Wine)	2007	—	—	—	—	—	—	—	—	Non-album singles
"Inspiratie" / "Oo" (split single with De Kift)	2008	—	—	—	—	—	—	—	—	Non-album singles
"Two Silver Trees" / "Bend to the Road"	2008	—	—	—	—	29	—	—	—	Carried to Dust
"Inspiración" / "El Gatillo"	2009	—	—	—	—	—	—	—	—	Carried to Dust
"Splitter"	2012	—	—	—	—	—	—	—	—	Algiers
"Tapping on the Line"	2015	—	—	—	—	—	—	—	—	Edge of the Sun
"Falling From The Sky"	2015	—	57	—	—	—	—	—	—	Edge of the Sun
"Cumbia de Donde"	2015	—	80	—	—	—	—	— (Note: "Cumbia de Donde" did not enter the UK Singles Chart, but peaked at number five on the UK Physical Singles Chart.)	—	Edge of the Sun
"Roll Tango"	2016	—	—	—	—	—	—	—	—	Edge of the Sun
"End of the World with You"	2017	27	39	—	—	—	—	—	—	The Thread That Keeps Us
"Under the Wheels"	2018	31	—	—	—	—	—	—	—	The Thread That Keeps Us
"Father Mountain" (with Iron & Wine)	2019	35	45	—	—	—	—	—	—	Years to Burn
"Hear the Bells"	2020	—	— (Note: "Hear the Bells" did not enter the Flanders Ultratop 50, but charted as an "extra tip" on the Ultratip chart.)	—	—	—	—	—	—	Seasonal Shift
"El Mirador"	2022	—	—	—	—	—	—	—	—	El Mirador
"—" denotes a recording that did not chart or was not released in that territory.

== DVDs ==
- World Drifts In: Live at the Barbican (2004) & Vinyl
- Live From Austin TX (Austin City Limits) (2009)

== Compilations ==
- Selections From Road Atlas: 1988–2011 (2011)

== Compilation contributions ==
- Committed Soundtrack (2000)
- It's a Cool, Cool Christmas – "Gift Xchange" (2000), a charity compilation by Xfm
- All Tomorrow's Parties 1.0 - "Piker Sam" (2001)
- Nothing Left to Lose: A Tribute to Kris Kristofferson – "Casey's Last Ride" (2003)
- Dead Man's Shoes :"Untitled II" "Untitled III" "Ritual Road Map""Crooked Road and the Briar" - Soundtrack (2004)
- Por Vida: A Tribute To The Songs Of Alejandro Escovedo - "Wave" (2004)
- Music From The Film "Happy Endings" - "Glimpse" and "Old Man Waltz" (2005)
- Sweetheart 2005: Love Songs – "Love Will Tear Us Apart" (2005), Hear Music
- Acoustic 07 – "Cruel" (2007), V2 Records
- I'm Not There: Original Soundtrack – "Goin' to Acapulco" (2007) The band also provide backing for other artists on several tracks. Goin' to Acapulco (Jim James & Calexico) (4:59)Dark eyes (Iron & Wine & Calexico) (4:30)One more cup of coffee (Roger McGuinn & Calexico) (4:31)Senor (Tales of Yankee Power) (Willie Nelson & Calexico) (5:18) Just like a woman (Charlotte Gainsbourg & Calexico) (4:20)
- Lammbock: Original Soundtrack
- Chris Gaffney Tribute: The Man of Somebody's Dreams - "Frank's Tavern" (2009)
- 10 Years in the Ground: Radio 1190 Presents Live Recordings - "Crystal Frontier" (2009)
- El Alpinista De Los Sueños - Tributo A Antonio Vega - "Mi Hogar En Cualquier Sitio" (2010)
- Luz de Vida – "Absent Afternoon" (2011)

== Remixes ==
- Two Lone Swordsmen - "Tiny Reminder No3 (Calexico Remix)" on Two Lone Swordsmen's EP "Further Reminders" (2001)
- Goldfrapp – "Human" (Calexico Vocal Version) on Goldfrapp's EP "Human"(2001)
- ISO68 – "Stoppages Est Plus (Calexico Remix)" on ISO68's EP "Here / There Played By" (2003)

== Collaborations ==
- On Jean-Louis Murat's album Mustango (1999)
- On Françoiz Breut's album Vingt à Trente Mille Jours (2000)
- On Neko Case's album Blacklisted (2002)
- On Jenny Toomey's album Tempting (2002), a collection of songs by Franklin Bruno
- On Nancy Sinatra's album Nancy Sinatra (a.k.a. To Nancy With Love) (2004)
- "Don't Leave Me Now" on Amparanoia's album Rebeldia Con Alegria (2004)
- On Los Super Seven's album Heard It on the X (2005)
- Esa Banda En Dub – with Nortec Collective's Panoptica included in Tijuana Sessions Vol. 3 (2005)
- On Françoiz Breut's album Une Saison Volée (2005)
- You Can't Always Listen to Hausmusik, But... (2006) – "Careless" (with The Notwist) and "Freunde" (with A Million Mercies)
- On Neko Case's album Fox Confessor Brings the Flood (2006)
- "Amor Porteño" on Gotan Project's album Lunático (2006)
- On Marianne Dissard's album "Dedicated To Your Walls. May They Keep Blooming" (2006), performed and composed by Joey Burns.
- On Naïm Amor's album Sanguine (2007)
- On Marianne Dissard's album "L'Entredeux" (2008), performed, produced and composed by Joey Burns. Also, with John Convertino on drums.
- On Lizz Wright's album The Orchard (2008)
- On Naïm Amor's EP Introducing... (2008)
- On Depedro's album Depedro (2008)
- On Vinicio Capossela's album Da solo (2008, track La faccia della terra )
- On Neko Case's album Middle Cyclone (2009)
- On Naïm Amor's EP Precious Second (2009)
- On Depedro's album On Tour (2009)
- On Susie Hug's album Tucson Moonshine (2010)
- On Amparo Sánchez's album Tucson-Habana (2010)
- On Depedro's album Nubes De Papel (2010)
- On Maggie Björklund's album Coming Home (2011)
- On Neko Case's album The Worse Things Get, the Harder I Fight, the Harder I Fight, the More I Love You (2013)
