= Jonny Vang =

- Directed by: Jens Lien
- Written by: Ståle Stein Berg
- Produced by: Dag Alveberg
- Starring: Aksel Hennie; Laila Goody; Fridtjov Såheim; Marit Andreassen; Bjørn Sundquist; Nils Vogt
- Edited by: Pål Gengenbach
- Music by: Calexico
- Distributed by: Universal Pictures (through United International Pictures)
- Release date: 14 February 2003; (Norway)
- Running time: 85 minutes
- Country: Norway
- Language: Norwegian
- Budget: 14,500,000 kr

Jonny Vang is a 2003 Norwegian film, directed by Jens Lien from a screenplay by Ståle Stein Berg. The film is a comedy-drama set in the Norwegian countryside and follows Jonny Vang, who struggles to succeed as a breeder of earthworms. The film was generally well received by critics and won the Amanda Award for "Best Actor" in 2003.

== Plot ==
Jonny Vang (Aksel Hennie) lives on the Norwegian countryside, where he is trying to establish a business breeding earthworms. His ambitions to expand are thwarted by the bank manager (Trond Brænne), who will not lend him the necessary money. He lives with his mother Brita (Marit Andreassen) and her difficult friend Odvar (Bjørn Sundquist). On top of all of this, he is also carrying out an affair with Tuva (Laila Goody) – the wife of his best friend Magnus (Fridtjov Såheim). Things get even worse when an unknown assailant knocks him over the head with a shovel.

== Cast ==
- Jonny Vang as Aksel Hennie
- Tuva as Laila Goody
- Magnus as Fridtjov Såheim
- Brita as Marit Andreassen
- Odvar as Bjørn Sundquist
- Police Officer as Nils Vogt
- Gunnar as Anders Ødegård
- Helene as Silje Salomonsen
- Bank manager as Trond Brænne

== Production ==
Jonny Vang was director Jens Lien's debut feature film. He had previously worked as a director of television advertisements and had been represented twice at the Cannes International Film Festival, with short films. He described the film as “a drama comedy, a juicy story, life, lust and rock 'n' roll. It's a dead serious comedy”.

Lien initially considered Hennie too young for the role, but the actor was persistent and eventually persuaded the director that he was suitable for the part. Although the story is set in Gudbrandsdalen, filming took place in the town of Fåvang.

To obtain permission to use Calexico's music, Lien travelled to the U.S. with an unfinished version of the film. He screened it at a rental store, where he translate the plot for the band and others present. The soundtrack includes music from the band's albums Spoke (1997), The Black Light (1998) and Hot Rail (2000).

== Reception ==
Jonny Vang was reasonably well received by the Norwegian press. The newspaper Dagbladet gave the film four out of six points, and commended it for good scenes, yet found it somewhat predictable. The reviewer mentioned Calexico's soundtrack as one of the best parts of the movie. Aftenposten's Per Haddal awarded five out of six points, and believed the movie was a well functional comedy. Also Haddal commended the choice of music.

International reviewers were less enthusiastic. Variety complimented the actors' performances, but found that the movie did not "have a great deal of drive or momentum". The reviewer at the Swedish website "DVD forum" jokingly said that he laughed often, so he hoped it was a comedy. Generally content with the movie, he found Hennie's performance somewhat "theatrical".

Aksel Hennie was awarded an Amanda Award for "Best Actor" for his effort in the film in 2003. The movie was also nominated in the category "Best Film", but lost out to Bent Hamer's Salmer fra kjøkkenet. Hennie also won the "Best Actor" award at the Brussels European Film Festival.
