= Mexrrissey =

Mexican band

- Origin: Mexico City, Mexican Federal District, Mexico
- Genres: Electronica, alternative rock, alternative dance, electro, experimental, Mexican music
- Years active: 2015–present
- Label: Nacional Records Volcán Records
- Members: Camilo Lara, Sergio Mendoza, Ceci Bástida, Jay De La Cueva, Alejandro Flores, Chetes, Ricardo Nájera, Adan Jodorowsky, Líber Téran, Clemente Castillo
- Website: https://www.mexrrissey.net

Mexrrissey is a Mexican supergroup co-founded by Camilo Lara (Mexican Institute of Sound) and Sergio Mendoza (Calexico, Orquesta Mendoza). Inspired by Morrissey and The Smiths' songs, Camilo and Sergio- along with Ceci Bastida, Jay de la Cueva, Alejandro Flores, Chetes and Ricardo Nájera- began this musical project in 2015. Their album No Manchester (2016) contains Morrissey songs translated into Spanish with a mix of Latin beats and sounds added to the music. After their first show in Mexico City, the band began with a UK tour in April 2015. During the spring of 2018, Mexrrissey conducted a UK tour promoted as "La Reina Is Dead".

== Members ==
1. Camilo Lara (Mexican Institute of Sound) – DJ, Production, Vocals, Sampling
2. Ceci Bástida (Tijuana No!) – Vocals, Keyboard
3. Sergio Mendoza (Calexico & La Orkesta Mendoza) – Vocals, Accordion
4. Chetes (Zurdok) – Vocals, Guitar
5. Jay De La Cueva (Molotov, Moderatto, Fobia, Titán) – Bass
6. Alejandro Flores (Violinist for Café Tacvba) – Violin
7. Ricardo Nájera (Furland) – Drums
8. Adan Jodorowsky (Adanowsky) – Guitar
9. Líber Téran (Los De Abajo) – Guitar
10. Jacob Valenzuela (Calexico) – Trumpet
11. Alex Gonzalez (Twin Tones) – Trumpet
12. Clemente Castillo (Jumbo) – Vocals, Guitar

== Albums ==
No Manchester – released March 4, 2016.

1. El Primero del Gang (First of the Gang to Die)
2. Estuvo Bien (Suedehead) (Live at Radiolovefest)
3. Cada Dia Es Domingo (Everyday Is Like Sunday) (Live at Radiolovefest)
4. México (Mexico) (Live at Radiolovefest)
5. Cada Día Es Domingo (Everyday Is Like Sunday)
6. International Playgirl (The Last of the Famous International Playboys)
7. México (Mexico)
8. Estuvo Bien (Suedehead)
9. Entré Más Me Ignoras, Más Cerca Estaré (The More You Ignore Me, the Closer I Get)
10. Me Choca Cuando Mis Amigos Triunfan (We Hate It When Our Friends Become Successful)
11. El Primero Del Gang (First of the Gang To Die) (Live at Radiolovefest)
12. International Playgirl (The Last of the Famous International Playboys) (Live at Radiolovefest)
