= Sanatorium (band) =

Macedonian thrash metal band

- Origin: Skopje, North Macedonia
- Genres: Thrash metal
- Years active: 1987–present
- Label: Lithium
- Members: Pero Stefanovski; Boban Vasilevski; Goran Stanković; Goran Atanasov
- Past members: Konstantin Kačev
- Website: sanatorium.com.mk

Sanatorium is a Macedonian thrash metal band from Skopje, established in 1987. They self-released the demo Welcome to Sanatorium in 1991, and Macedonian Radio Television issued their follow-up, Na rabot na razumot (Macedonian: На Работ На Разумот), in 1992. The same year, they released the concert record Live in Hungary. In 1996, the band issued the album No More, which is sung entirely in English, except for the bonus tracks. In 2001, Lithium records published the self-titled Sanatorium, which contained all the material from Na rabot na razumot, two new singles, and three live tracks. After a long hiatus, in 2015, the band issued a single that includes the tracks "Molk" (Macedonian: "Молк"), "Kazi 'Ne'" (Macedonian: "Кажи 'Не'"), and "Molitva" (Macedonian: "Молитва").

== Band members ==
Current

- Pero Stefanovski – guitar, vocals
- Boban Vasilevski – guitar
- Goran Stanković – bass
- Goran Atanasov – drums

Past

- Konstantin Kačev – guitar

== Discography ==
- Welcome to Sanatorium (demo, 1991)
- Na rabot na razumot (1992)
- Live in Hungary (live, 1992)
- No More (1996)
- Sanatorium (2001)
- "Molk" / "Kazi 'Ne'" / "Molitva" (single, 2015)

== See also ==
- Music of North Macedonia
