= Marianne Dissard =

French-American artist, author, and singer

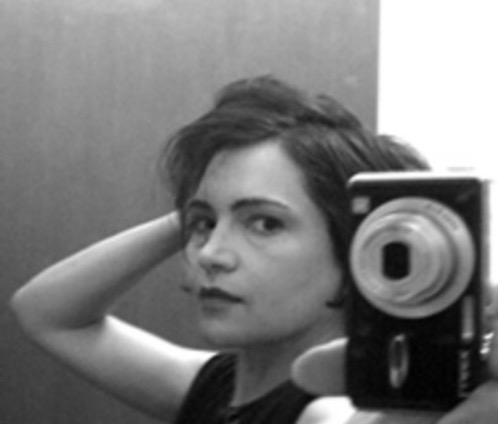
- Tucson, 2006

Background information
- Birth name: Marianne Dissard
- Born: May 20, 1969 (age 55); Tarbes, France
- Genres: art rock, baroque rock, chanson
- Occupation(s): singer, photographer, author, director
- Instrument(s): voice, production, visual arts, writing
- Years active: 1989–present
- Labels: Vacilando '68/Le Pop Musik/ Trop Exprès Music
- Website: mariannedissard.com

Marianne Dissard is a French-born American singer, photographer, author, producer, and filmmaker.

She has released four albums, four EPs, and a number of singles and collaborations. She started touring abroad in 2006, including in countries such as China, Turkey, New Zealand, and Australia.

Her first book, memoir Not Me, was self-published in 2019. Her photography has been exhibited in Ramsgate (UK), Turner Contemporary in Margate (UK), Paris (France), and Glasgow (UK).

== Personal life ==
=== Activism ===
In 2004, Dissard founded The Tucson Suffragettes in Tucson, Arizona to encourage youth voter registration in the 2004 American presidential election cycle.

Her 2019 memoir "Not Me" details her decades-long struggles with eating disorders and she has been open in sharing her experience on stage and in the media.

== Appearances ==
=== Television and Radio ===
On May 22, 2000, Marianne Dissard appeared on France Inter's Studio 105 Black Sessions no.163 and performed with Calexico their single "Ballad of Cable Hogue" from album Hot Rail.

On September 25, 2009, Dissard appeared on SoundCheck Radio WNYC New York

On October 7, 2011, she appeared on Radio France in Sous Les Etoiles Exactement.

On March 18, 2013, Dissard appeared on Arizona Public Media Tucson.

=== Podcasts ===
On September 30, 2022, she appeared on the Scots Whay Hae podcast.

On June 9, 2021, she appeared on Le Village Pop podcast.

=== Films ===
Dissard appeared in Keja Ho Kramer's 2002 film Diam's, Astrid Serafini's 2014 film No Spare in New York, Marianne Dissard's 2010 film Lonesome Cowgirls

== Discography ==
=== Studio albums ===
Title	Year	Other artist(s)	Label(s)
"Dedicated To Your Walls. May They Keep Blooming"	2006	Joey Burns, Naïm Amor	Trop Exprès Music
"L'entredeux"	2008	Calexico	Trop Exprès Music, Le Pop Musik, Vacilando '68
"Paris One Takes (City Series)"	2010	Sergio Mendoza, Brian Lopez, Olivier Samouillan	Trop Exprès Music
"L'abandon"	2010	Christian Ravaglioli	Trop Exprès Music, Le Pop Musik
"The Cat. Not Me."	2013	Sergio Mendoza	Trop Exprès Music, Vacilando '68
"Cibola Gold: Best Of Compilation (2008–2015)"	2016	Sergio Mendoza, BK-One, Calexico, Naïm Amor, Christian Ravaglioli	Trop Exprès Music
"Rappel*le"	2023	Raphael Mann	Trop Exprès Music

=== EPs ===
Title	Year	Other artist(s)	Label
four-track 7" "Untitled"	2006	Joey Burns	Trop Exprès Music
"Berlin Two Takes (City Series)"	2011	Sergio Mendoza, Brian Lopez, Gabriel Sullivan	Trop Exprès Music
"Cologne Vier Takes (City Series)"	2015	Yan Péchin, Allyson Ezell	Trop Exprès Music
"Won't You Please"	2022	Beth Goodfellow, Matt Mitchell	Trop Exprès Music

=== Singles ===
Title	Year	Other artist(s)	Label
"Un Gros Chat" (bonus track)	2010	Arno	Berlin Two Takes
"Rosemary"	2021	Raphael Mann	Frizz Records

=== Guest appearances ===
Title	Year	Artist	Album
"Ballad of Cable Hogue"	1999	Calexico	Hot Rail
"The Best"	2019	The Inspector Cluzo	Population Control

== Filmography ==
=== Documentaries ===
Title	Year	Other artist(s)	Broadcast, Screenings	As
"Post No Bills"	1991	Robbie Conal	Sundance Festival, ITVS PBS	Co-producer, sound recordist
"Drunken Bees"	1994	Giant Sand, Calexico, Victoria Williams, Vic Chestnutt, Rainer Ptacek	Arizona Film Festival	Director, editor, producer, camera
"Low Y Cool"	1997	Robert Kramer, Amor Belhom Duo	Planête Cable, France	Director
"Dublin: Celtic Traveler"	1999		Breizh TV, France	Director, camera

=== Fiction ===
Title	Year	Other artist(s)	Screenings
"Lonesome Cowgirls"	2010	Megan Cox, BK-One	Loft Cinema, Tucson

=== Music Videos ===
Title	Year	Artist	Album
"Pulling on a Cig"	2000	Amor Belhom Duo	Wavelab Performance
"Les draps sourds"	2008	Marianne Dissard	L'entredeux
"The One and Only"	2010	Marianne Dissard	L'abandon
"Je ne le savais pas"	2013	Marianne Dissard	The Cat. Not Me.
"Mambo Mexicano"	2013	Orkesta Mendoza	Orkesta Mendoza

== See also ==
- Chanson
