= El Burrito de Belén =

Venezuelan Christmas song

"El Burrito Sabanero" ('The Little Donkey from the Savannah'), or rarely "El Burrito de Belén" ('The Little Donkey from Bethlehem') is an aguinaldo from Venezuela. It was written by Hugo Blanco for the 1972 Christmas season. The song was first recorded by the Venezuelan folk singer Simón Díaz, included on his record, Las Gaitas de Simon where he was accompanied by the Venezuelan Children's Choir. Later, the children's musical group La Rondallita recorded the song in November 1972. This version gained popularity in Latin America. It has since been recorded many times by popular artists. Nearly 50 years later, "El Burrito de Belén" remains a yuletide favorite, cherished in Latin communities worldwide — and beyond, into the Anglo market of the United States. Billboard magazine included the tune in its 2022 list of the top 100 holiday songs of all time.

== Cover versions ==
- Colombian singer-songwriter Juanes recorded his version as the first radio single from the Christmas compilation album Superestrella en Navidades (2008).
- The Bronx-based group Aventura recorded a bachata cover in 2008.
- American singer, actress and talk show host Adrienne Houghton released "El Burrito Sabanero" on her debut solo album New Tradiciones (2017).
- American musician Aloe Blacc released his version titled "Mi Burrito Sabanero" on his 2018 Christmas album Christmas Funk.
- The Arizona-based band Calexico included the song on their 2020 Christmas album Seasonal Shift, under the title "Mi Burrito Sabanero".
- American regional Mexican band Fuerza Regida released a cover of the song in 2020, titled as "Burrito Sabanero", on their Christmas EP Navidad con la Regida.
- American group Larry & Joe released a cover of the song as a single in 2023.
- Spanish singer David Bisbal included the song on his 2024 Christmas album Todo es Posible en Navidad (English: Everything Is Possible at Christmas).
