= Scraping (album) =

Live album by Calexico
- Released: 2002
- Recorded: 2000–2002
- Genre: Indie rock, post rock, Americana, Tex-Mex, mariachi
- Length: 68:59
- Label: Our Soil, Our Strength
- Producer: ?

Calexico chronology
Aerocalexico (2001)	Scraping (2002)	Feast of Wire (2003)

Professional ratings
Review scores
Source	Rating
AllMusic	4/5 stars

Scraping is a live album, drawn primarily from Calexico's 2002 concert at San Francisco's Great American Music Hall. Two tracks are from a 2001 performance at the Temple of Music and Art in Tucson AZ, while a third was recorded at the 2000 Roskilde Festival in Denmark.

The recording features several songs with the Mariachi Luz De Luna.

== Track listing ==
1. "Wash"
2. "The Ride (Part II)"
3. "Sonic Wind"
4. "Frontera/Trigger"
5. "El Picador"
6. "Sanchez"
7. "Fade"
8. "Wind Up Bird"
9. "Minas de Cobre"
10. "Lost In Space"
11. "Stray"
12. "Crystal Frontier"
13. "Paper Re-Route"
