= Convict Pool =

EP by Calexico
- Released: April 6, 2004
- Recorded: Wedgewood, Nashville, Tennessee; Water Works, Wavelab Studios, Tucson, Arizona
- Genre: Indie rock Americana; Tex-Mex; Alternative country
- Label: Quarterstick Records

Calexico chronology
Feast of Wire (2003)	Convict Pool (2004)	In the Reins (2005)

Professional ratings
Review scores
Source	Rating
AllMusic	3/5 stars
Pitchfork	7.5/10
Tiny Mix Tapes	4/5 stars

Convict Pool is an EP released by Arizona band Calexico. Among its tracks is a cover version of the Minutemen's classic, "Corona," with an arrangement featuring mariachi horns reminiscent of Johnny Cash's "Ring of Fire," and a cover of Love's "Alone Again Or" featuring flamenco handclaps.

== Track listing ==
1. "Alone Again Or" – (3:24) (with Nicolai Dunger and His Band; music by Bryan MacLean)
2. "Convict Pool" – (3:58) (Joey Burns)
3. "Si Tu Disais" – (3:23) (lyrics by Dominique Ané; music by Ané, Chataigner, Toorop, Bondu; originally sung by Françoiz Breut)
4. "Corona" – (3:21) (Dennes D. Boon)
5. "Praskovia" – (2:44) (Burns)
6. "Sirena" – (3:42) (Burns)
