= Françoiz Breut (album) =

Françoiz Breut (08648046495)

Studio album by Françoiz Breut
- Released: 1997
- Recorded: 1997
- Genre: Chanson, Indie pop
- Length: 42:46
- Label: Lithium, Bella Union

Françoiz Breut chronology
Françoiz Breut (08648046495) (1997)	Vingt à Trente Mille Jours (2000)

Professional ratings
Review scores
Source	Rating
AllMusic	3/5 stars
Pitchfork Media	8.4/10

Françoiz Breut, also known as 08648046495, is the first album by the French singer Françoiz Breut, released in 1997. The songs were written by Breut's then-boyfriend, French pop star Dominique Ané.

== Critical reception ==
The Wall Street Journal thought that "Breut's clear soprano benefits from the soulful lyrics of her petit ami, in an excellent collaboration."

AllMusic wrote that "Breut's vocals are mostly quite confident, as she traverses a delicate noir path."

== Track listing ==
1. Tarifa (Dominique Ané) – 3:44
2. Ma colère (Dominique Ané) – 5:31
3. La rue ne te reprendra pas (Dominique Ané) – 3:17
4. Everyone kisses a stranger (Dominique Ané/Françoiz Breut/Eric Deleporte/Sarah Froning) – 2:57
5. La femme sans histoire (Dominique Ané) – 4:28
6. Le Nord (Dominique Ané) – 8:23
7. Motus (Dominique Ané) – 3:11
8. Le don d’ubiquité (Dominique Ané) – 5:25
9. Après la nuit (Dominique Ané) – 3:20
10. My wedding man (Dominique Ané) – 2:21

(C) Lithium 1997 – digipak – 7 24384 42142 7 (C) Bella Union 1998 – digipak – BELLACD9 – [10 October 1998]
