= Brian Lopez (musician) =

American singer

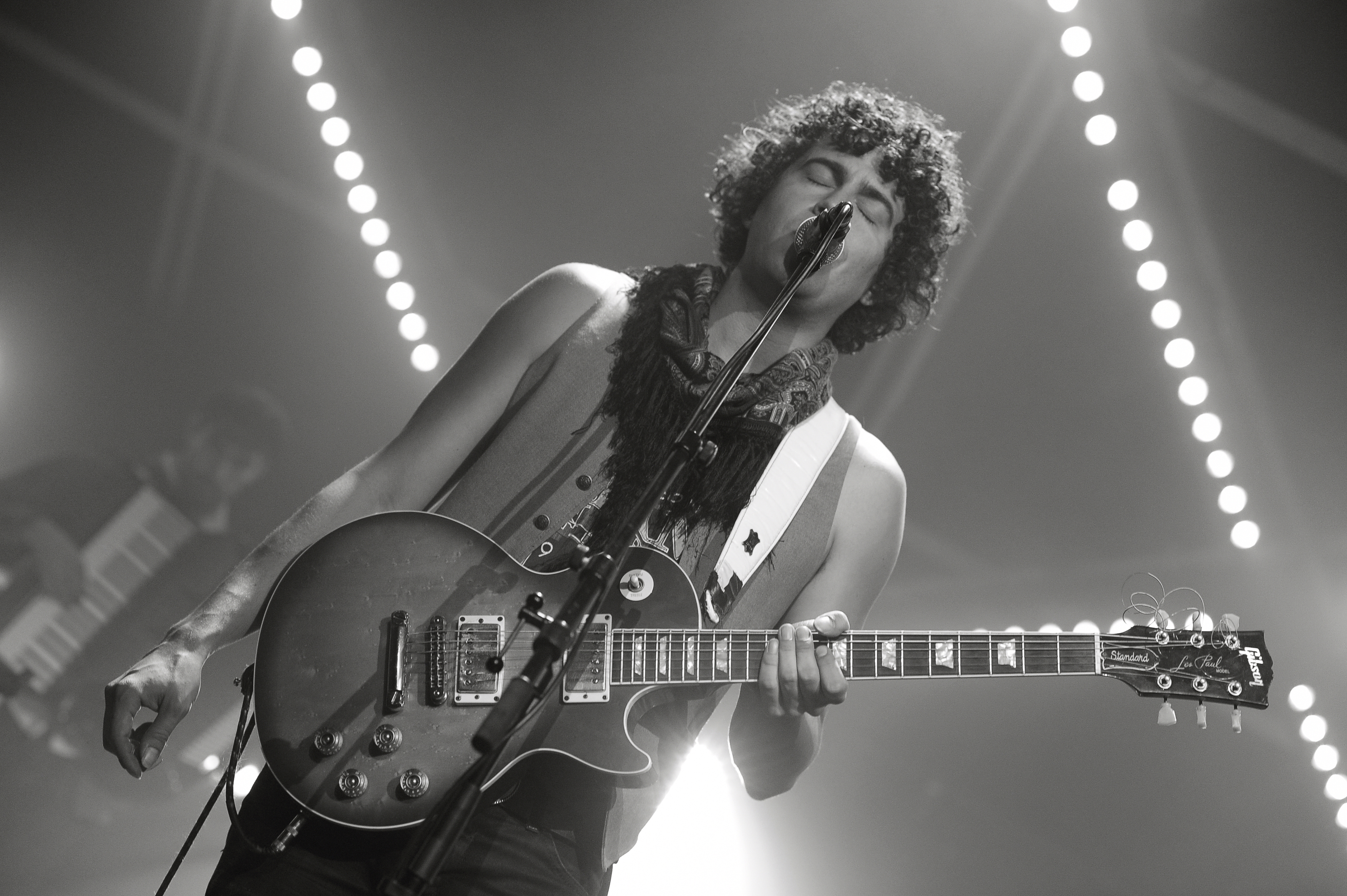
- Brian Lopez. 2012.

Background information
- Born: January 20, 1983 (age 43)
- Origin: Tucson, Arizona
- Genres: Indie Rock, singer-songwriter, art rock, cumbia, desert noir
- Occupations: Singer/songwriter, guitarist, producer
- Instruments: vocals, guitar, piano
- Labels: Wooden Tooth Records, Le Pop Musik and Funzalo Records

Brian Lopez (born 1983 in Tucson, Arizona) is a Mexican-American singer-songwriter, guitarist, producer, and recording artist from Southern Arizona. His music is influenced by grunge rock, cross-border musical traditions and has come to epitomize the sound of the 21st-century American Southwest. A significant figure in the development of the Southwest psychedelic rock movement, Lopez has established a number of noted bands including Mostly Bears and Xixa, and played with internationally recognized artists Calexico, Giant Sand, KT Tunstall, and Nouvelle Vague. His solo albums include Ultra, Static Noise, and Prelude. Lopez's musical style has been compared to Nick Drake, Elliott Smith, Jeff Buckley, and Radiohead.

== Early life and music career ==
Lopez grew up in the Sonoran Desert city of Tucson, Arizona. The son of Pima Community College basketball coach Michael Lopez and Sandy Kondrat, he showed an early aptitude for music and began playing guitar at the age of 12 while attending Roskruge Bilingual K-8 Magnet School. Attending Tucson High School, he played basketball and continued his musical pursuits, taking music theory classes while listening to Nirvana and Pearl Jam.

Lopez matriculated in the University of Arizona in 2001, receiving a classical guitar scholarship. In 2005 at the age of 21, Lopez spent an influential six months in Barcelona, Spain. The Spanish and Catalan cultures influenced his songwriting and music. In 2006, he graduated with a Bachelor of Fine Arts in Music and a double minor in Spanish and business.

The arid cultural landscapes of Arizona significantly impacted Lopez's musical approach and artistic style. Reflecting his views on the desert city, he noted in a 2012 interview with Best New Bands, "It’s a desperate environment filled with dwellers and survivalists. At the same time, there is an exotic beauty that is exclusive to the Sonoran Desert. Desolate, desperate, yet beautiful. In that sense, I feel my music is parallel."

== Mostly Bears ==
In 2005, Lopez, with musical partners Geoffrey Hidalgo and Nick Wantland, launched the indie rock band Mostly Bears. The band garnered significant attention, receiving numerous recognitions and awards. The southwest desert rock music was a fusion between alternative, progressive, and newer indie rock of the period. The band released their first record and began a national tour in 2007. Alibi.com noted that "If it isn't crushed under the weight of its own hype, Tucson's Mostly Bears could emerge as the leader of the next prog-rock revolution." The band released the EP "Only Child" in 2007, followed by their debut LP "The Ed Mitchell Clinic" in 2008. The band garnered national attention from music writers, critics, bloggers, inclusion in numerous national magazines, and peaked at number one on KEXP in 2008.

== Solo career ==
Lopez was part of an important group of 21st-century emerging musicians within Tucson in the early 2010s, including Sergio Mendoza, Salvador Duran, and Gabriel Sullivan, who were creating a new indie rock sound tied to the cultural roots of southern Arizona, Northern Mexico, and the geography of the place.

In 2011, Lopez launched a solo career. He collaborated and performed with the French singer, living in Tucson, Marianne Dissard and that year toured across Europe with her. In response to the 2011 Tucson shooting, which injured congresswomen Gabby Giffords, Lopez joined with other noted performers included Neko Case and Jimmy Eat World to create a compilation record Luz de Vida to raise funds for those impacted.

In 2011, Lopez sang backing vocals on the song "Windows Are Rolled Down" on Amos Lee's album Mission Bell.

Lopez's first major breakout was the release of his first record in 2012 "Ultra" on Funzalo Records. Lopez toured with the record across the US and Europe. Rolling Stone Germany called "Ultra": "psychedelic chamber pop with a surrealist touch of Dalí." European tastemaker Music Express called Lopez: "the missing link between Devendra Banhart and Roy Orbison" and gave "Ultra" 4.5 out of 5 stars. The Tucson-based radio station KXCI named “Ultra" its number 1 record of 2012.

In 2013, Lopez toured with international recording artist KT Tunstall, as the opening act on her Invisible Empire Crescent Moon tour in North America and the UK. He also sang backing vocals on the studio album. Lopez was prominently featured in the single "Feel it All".

In 2014, Lopez released his second record, "Static Noise," with a large event at Tucson's premier independent music venue Hotel Congress’s Club Congress. Music Express again gave it 4.5 out of 5 stars and said "Lopez is without a doubt one of the best songwriters of his generation." More European and US touring followed.

The French chamber orchestra The Color Bars Experience featured Lopez, along with recording artists Eric Pulido from the band Midlake and Mark Gardener from the band Ride, on their "Plays Nick Drake" tour across Europe in 2016. Lopez sang lead vocals on selected numbers from Nick Drake's 1972 album Pink Moon.

In addition to his solo work, during this period, Lopez played in Howe Gelb's band Giant Sand and had inclusion on the album "Tucson". Lopez's musical contributions to the record were noted by The New York Times in July 2016.

In 2018, Lopez produced his third solo record, “Prelude” released by Wooden Tooth Records, a low-fi record he wrote and recorded in his Tucson home. The album received critical acclaim. In 2020, Lopez was a featured performer in John F. Kennedy Center for the Performing Arts Across America's "West Arts."

In 2022, Lopez released a number of singles, including "Remedios" and "Pretty Compass".

Lopez's songs have been used in film and tv scores including Frank and Cindy starring Renee Russo and Oliver Platt in 2015, the Netflix original series October Faction in 2020, CBS's border drama Coyote in 2021, and Amazon Prime Video's series Night Sky starring Sissy Spacek and J.K. Simmons in 2022.

== XIXA ==
In addition to his solo career, Lopez was a founding member of the band Xixa with singer-songwriter Gabriel Sullivan in 2012. The group was originally called "Chicha Dust." The band focused its music towards latin roots, with psychedelic cumbia covers and original desert rock. Lopez and Sullivan co-lead the band and collaborate on the creative direction, lyrics and music. In 2015, the band released their debut EP "Shift and Shadow," followed by their debut LP "Bloodline" in 2016. In 2017 the band was approached by English film director Alex Cox to score the end credits for his film "Tombstone Roshomon". The song was later taken off the film due to a publishing dispute but was released as a single "Tombstone Roshomon" in 2018. In 2019, XIXA released their second EP "The Code.”

Since 2016, the band has toured extensively in the US and Europe, playing numerous music festivals including South by Southwest in Austin, Texas, Vive Latino in Mexico City, and Lowlands in Utrecht, Netherlands. In the spring of 2021, XIXA released its second studio album "Genesis," which Rolling Stone France named the 6th best album of 2021. During the COVID-19 pandemic, XIXA played numerous virtual concerts including a festival in Peru.

== Calexico ==
In May 2018, Lopez announced he would be playing with internationally recognized band Calexico as lead guitarist and backing vocalist, touring North America, Australia and Europe. In 2022-24, Lopez again played with Calexico on their El Mirador tours across North America, Europe, and the Middle East.

== Discography ==
- Ultra (2012)
- Static Noise (2014)
- Prelude (2018)
- Tidal (2023)

== Singles and EPs ==
- El Rojo (EP) (2010)
- El Blanco (EP) (2010)
- Modern Man (2014)
- Remedios (2022)
- Pretty Compass (2022)
