= Toolbox (disambiguation) =

A toolbox is a container used to organize, carry, and protect the owner's tools.

Toolbox (alternatively tool box) may also refer to:

== Music ==
- Toolbox (album), 1991 album by Ian Gillan
- Tool Box (Aaron Tippin album), 1995 album by Aaron Tippen
- Tool Box (Calexico album), 2007 album by Calexico

== Software ==
- Macintosh Toolbox, a set of application programming interfaces
- Jetbrains Toolbox, A JetBrains application
- ToolboX (software), an integrated development environment designed to introduce computer programming in academic subjects

== Other uses ==
- The Tool Box, bar in San Francisco
- NIH Toolbox
