= Even My Sure Things Fall Through =

EP by Calexico
- Released: May 22, 2001
- Genre: Indie rock, alt.country, americana
- Label: Quarterstick Records
- Producer: Naim Amor; Ben McQuillen; Joey Burns

Calexico chronology
Tete a Tete (2001)	Even My Sure Things Fall Through (2001)	Aerocalexico (2001)

Even My Sure Things Fall Through is an EP by Arizona band Calexico.

Elizabeth Nottingham in the Austin American-Statesman gave the album three stars, stating that while the songs kept up the band's "Southwestern theme", they also combined the music with elements of "mariachi, alt-country, lounge-fusion, and straight-up pop".

== Track listing ==
1. "Sonic Wind" (Instrumental mix)
2. "Crystal Frontier" (Widescreen version)
3. "Untitled III" (Two Loneswordsmen remix)
4. "Chanel #5"
5. "Banderilla"
6. "Crooked Road and the Briar"
7. "Crystal Frontier" (Acoustic version)
8. "Hard Hat" (remix)
