= Xixa =

American musical group

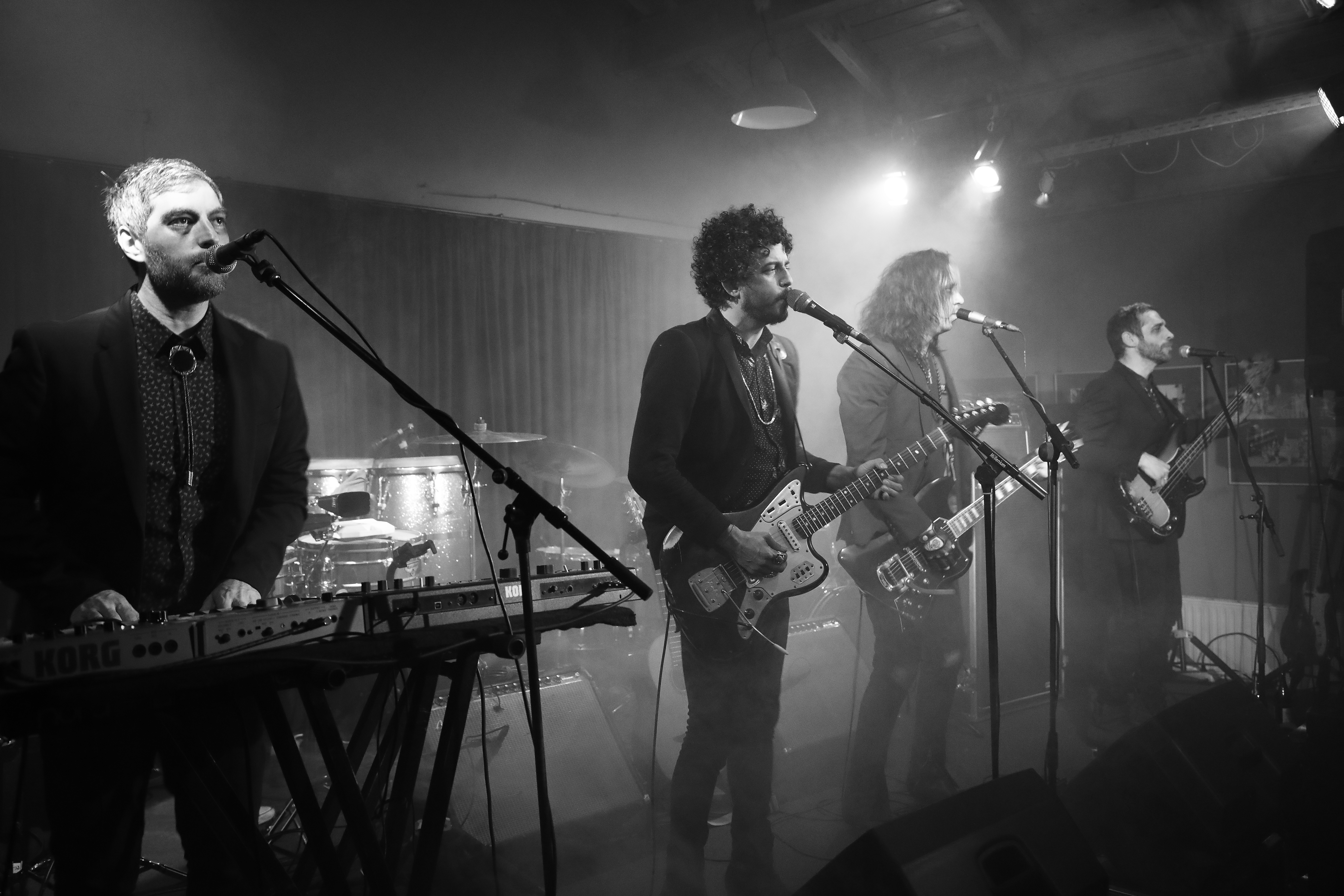
Xixa in 2019

XIXA is an American rock band from Tucson, Arizona. AllMusic describes their music as "a form of blues indebted to the desert, mixed in with their Latin roots and a dose of gothic horror".

== History ==
Brian Lopez and Gabriel Sullivan founded a group called Chicha Dust, which eventually became XIXA, releasing its first album, an eight-track live EP, in 2013. Both Lopez and Sullivan had previously played in the group Giant Sand. The group's name references chicha, a Peruvian style of music indebted to both cumbia and psychedelic rock.

Following the debut EP, Shift and Shadow, the group released a full-length album, Bloodline, in 2016, and toured the United States and Europe. A four-song EP called The Code arrived in 2019. Genesis, a second full-length, arrived in 2021.

== Members ==
- Brian Lopez - vocals, guitar
- Gabriel Sullivan - vocals, guitar
- Geoffrey Hidalgo - bass
- Hikit Corbel - bass
- Jason Urman - keyboards
- Winston Watson - drums

== Discography ==
- Shift and Shadow (Self-released, 2013)
- Bloodline (Barbes Records, 2016)
- The Code EP (Self-released, 2019)
- Genesis (Barbes, 2021)
- Xolo (Jullian, 2025)
