= The Mother and the Whore =

1973 French New Wave epic arthouse romantic drama film by Jean Eustache

- Film poster
- Directed by: Jean Eustache
- Written by: Jean Eustache
- Produced by: Vincent Malle; Bob Rafelson
- Starring: Bernadette Lafont; Jean-Pierre Léaud; Françoise Lebrun
- Cinematography: Pierre Lhomme
- Edited by: Jean Eustache; Denise de Casabianca
- Production companies: Élite Films; Ciné Qua Non; Les Films du Losange; Simar Films; V.M. Productions
- Distributed by: NPF Planfilm
- Release date: May 1973 (Cannes Film Festival)
- Running time: 219 minutes
- Country: France
- Language: French
- Budget: 700,000 francs
- Box office: $44,050

The Mother And The Whore (French: La Maman Et La Putain) is a 1973 French New Wave arthouse romantic drama film directed by Jean Eustache and starring Jean-Pierre Léaud, Bernadette Lafont and Françoise Lebrun. The story follows an examination of the relationships between three characters in a love triangle during the late 60s French society. It was Eustache's first feature film and is considered his masterpiece. Eustache wrote the screenplay drawing inspiration from his own relationships, and shot the film from May to July 1972. It is widely considered to be the very last expressive film made out of French New Wave movement.

The film screened at the 1973 Cannes Film Festival, where it won the Grand Prix. With some divided initial critical reaction, it has been championed as tremendous masterpiece by later critics, filmmakers and cinephiles.

== Plot ==
Alexandre is an unemployed young intellectual, possibly a journalist, living a rudderless life in Paris. Subtly but entirely self-absorbed, Alexandre spends most of his days lecturing his companions on political and philosophical topics, including his opinions on contemporary films, such as The Working Class Goes to Heaven, and his memories of the May '68 protests. He lives with his lover, Marie, who works at a dress shop and responds to his continuous apathy towards her with angry invective that masks her deep feelings for him. When Alexandre attempts to persuade an ex-girlfriend, Gilberte, to marry him, she chooses instead to marry another man. Alexandre then heads to the popular Les Deux Magots café, where he gets the phone number of a woman leaving. The two eventually go on a date. Her name is Veronika, a Polish-French anaesthesia nurse who lives at the Hôpital Laennec. Priding herself on her promiscuity and her status as a liberated woman, Veronika makes advances towards Alexandre, eventually seducing him.

Marie immediately sees through Alexandre's clumsy attempts to hide his affair, treating him with increasing fury that only subsides when they have sex. When Marie goes on a business trip to London, Alexandre takes Veronika to his apartment and sleeps with her in the bed he shares with Marie. After each tryst, Alexandre lectures the women on various topics while playing classical and pop music on his record player.

Eventually, Veronika visits Alexandre’s apartment while drunk. She arrives to find him and Marie naked in bed and hurls insults at both of them. The three quickly begin a ménage à trois, sharing the same bed. Although Marie and Veronika claim to enjoy the polyamorous relationship, each secretly competes for Alexandre’s undivided affection. After Alexandre reacts poorly to Marie inviting one of her ex-lovers to a party, the relationship deteriorates rapidly. At the Café Flore, Veronika scathingly criticises Alexandre’s attitude towards women, accusing him of not loving her—or anyone—the way she loves him. Later, Marie attempts to commit suicide with sleeping pills, but Alexandre stops her in time. This prompts Veronika to break down, delivering a lengthy monologue about how promiscuous women are perceived as "whores" and rejecting some of her "liberated" political beliefs. She also tells Alexandre that she might be pregnant with his child.

Alexandre decides to take Veronika back to her apartment at the hospital, leaving Marie sobbing alone in the flat. After dropping Veronika off, he storms back into her apartment and asks her to marry him. Veronika breaks down, crying and laughing simultaneously, and claims she is going to throw up. Feeling what might be morning sickness, she tells Alexandre that, if he really wants to help, he can fetch a dish for her to be sick in. Alexandre complies, then sits down on the floor, overwhelmed and distraught.

== Cast ==
- Bernadette Lafont as Marie
- Jean-Pierre Léaud as Alexandre
- Françoise Lebrun as Veronika
- Isabelle Weingarten as Gilberte
- Jacques Renard as Alexandre's friend
- Jean-Noël Picq as Offenbach's lover
- Geneviève Mnich as Veronika's friend
- Berthe Granval as Mary's friend
- André Téchiné as a man at the Deux Magots (uncredited)
- Jean-Claude Biette as another man at the Deux Magots (uncredited)
- Jean Douchet as a man at the Café Flore (uncredited)
- Noël Simsolo as another man at the Café Flore (uncredited)
- Caroline Loeb as a young woman reading on a terrace (uncredited)
- Bernard Eisenschitz as Maurice (uncredited)
- Jean Eustache as the man at the supermarket/Gilberte's husband (uncredited)
- Pierre Cottrell (uncredited)
- Douchka (uncredited)

== Production ==
In 1972 Eustache had begun to doubt his career in films and contemplated quitting the business. He told a reporter from Le Nouvel Observateur "If I knew what it was that I wanted, I wouldn't wake up in the morning to make films. I'd do nothing, I'd try to live without doing or producing anything." Soon afterwards he got a new idea for a film to make with his friends Jean-Pierre Léaud and Bernadette Lafont; he also brought in his ex-lover Françoise Lebrun who at that time was a literature student and had never acted before. Eustache was loaned money from friend Barbet Schroeder to spend three months writing the script, which was over three hundred pages. Although the film often seems to be highly improvised, every word of dialogue was written by Eustache. The film was very autobiographical and was inspired by Eustache's various relationships, such as his then recent breakup with Françoise Lebrun and romantic relationships with Marinka Matuszewsk and Catherine Garnier. Many of the locations used in the film were places that Garnier had lived or worked. The character played by Jacques Renard was based on Eustache's friend Jean-Jacques Schuhl.

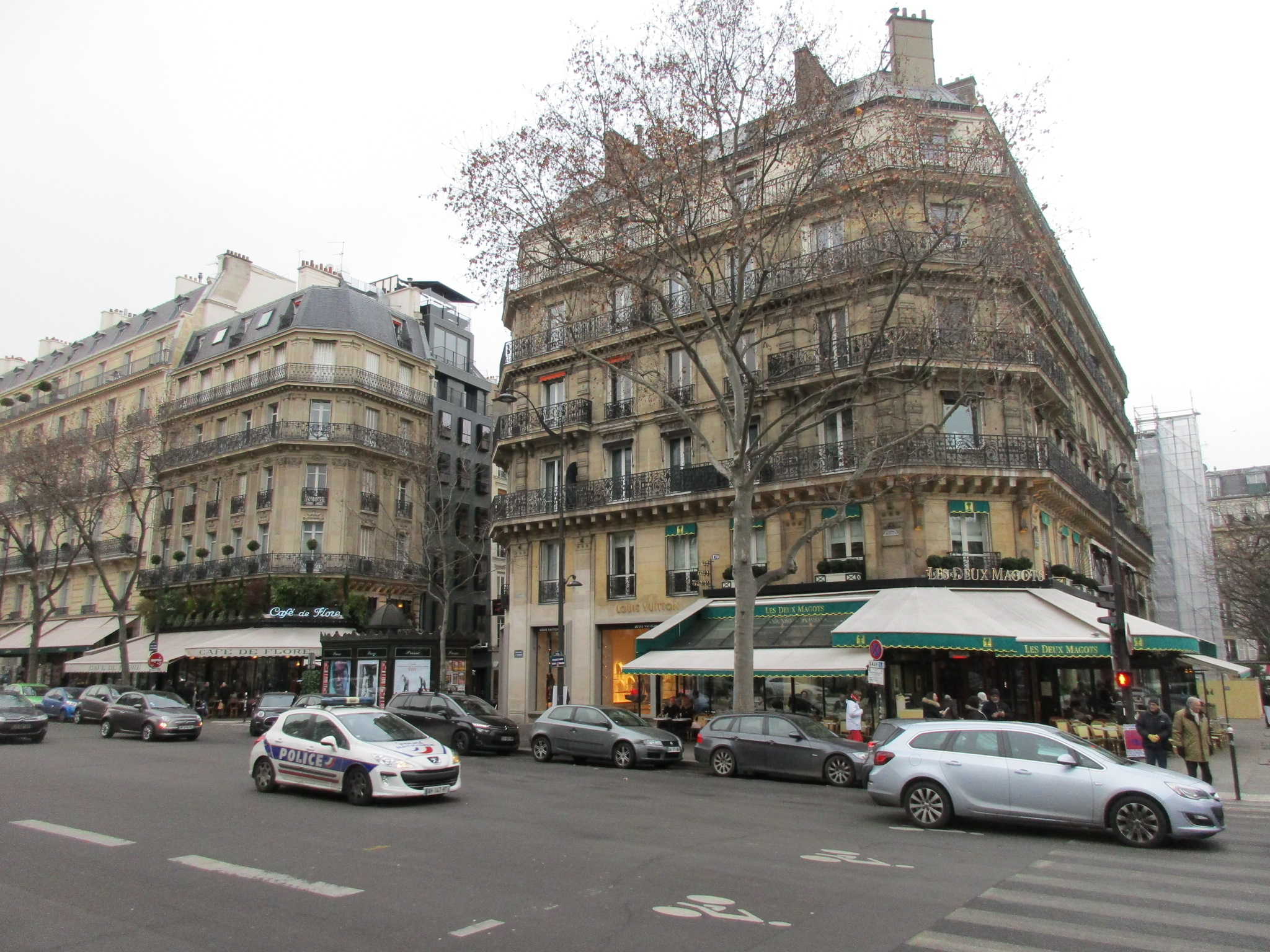
Les Deux Magots was a setting and filming location.

The film was shot between May 21 and July 11, 1972 on a budget of 700,000 francs. Eustache called it a very hostile film, and it mostly consisted of dialogues and monologues about sex. Eustache says that the character Alexandre is "destroying [the three lead characters], but he is looking for it all along. After his voyage into madness and depression, he ends up alone. That's when I stop the film." Filming locations included Les Deux Magots Café, the Café de Flore, the Café le Saint-Claude, the Laennec Hospital, the Blue Train restaurant and inside various apartments on the Rue de Vaugirard and Rue Vavin. The film had no musical score and only used natural sounds and occasionally music played by the characters on phonographs, such as Wolfgang Amadeus Mozart, Édith Piaf, Marlene Dietrich and Deep Purple.

Eustache described the film as a "narrative of certain seemingly innocuous acts. It could be the narrative of entirely different acts, in other places. What happens, the places where the action unfolds, have no importance...My subject is the way in which important actions situate themselves in a continuum of innocuous ones. It's the description of the normal course of events without the schematic abbreviation of cinematographic dramatization."

Luc Béraud served as assistant director on the film.

== Reception ==
The Mother and the Whore is considered Eustache's masterpiece, and was called the best film of the 1970s by Cahiers du cinéma. It won the Grand Prix of the Jury and the FIPRESCI prize at the 1973 Cannes Film Festival. The film created a scandal at the Cannes Film Festival, as many critics saw the film as immoral and obscene or, in the words of the broadsheet Le Figaro, "an insult to the nation", while Télé-7-Jours called it a "monument of boredom and a Himalaya of pretension". On its initial run the film sold over 343,000 tickets in France.

After gaining little public recognition despite receiving praise throughout the years from critics and directors, such as François Truffaut and other members of the French New Wave, Eustache became an overnight success and internationally famous after the film's Cannes premiere. He soon financed his next film. The critic Dan Yakir said that the film was "a rare instance in French cinema where the battle of the sexes is portrayed not from the male point of view alone". James Monaco called it, "one of the most significant French films of the 1970s". Jean-Louise Berthomé said, "I am not sure that La maman et la putain, with its romances of a poor young man of 1972, doesn't say something new."

Pauline Kael writing for The New Yorker, said the film "represented the dead hopes of decade and of a generation." She goes onto describes the attitude of the film as one "of educated people who use their education as a way of making contact with each other rather than the larger world" and where the characters "live in an atmosphere of apocalyptic narcissism." Kael praised the film, saying it reminded her of John Cassavetes in "his trying to put raw truth on the screen." She equates the film with where "New Wave meets Old Wave."

Jean-Louis Bory of Le Nouvel Observateur gave the film a negative review, calling it misogynistic and criticizing the characterization of Alexandre.

On review aggregator website Rotten Tomatoes, the film holds an approval rating of 94% based on 35 reviews, with an average rating of 9.3/10.

== Legacy ==
The film's reputation has increased over time. In 1982, the literary magazine Les Nouvelles littéraires celebrated the tenth anniversary of the film by publishing a series of articles about it.

It has been called one of the best films in French history by Jean-Michel Frodon and Jean-Henri Roger. Film director Olivier Assayas has especially praised the film and considers it an example of what to strive for in filmmaking. It was ranked the second greatest French film of all time by a poll of filmmakers.

Andrew Johnston, writing in Time Out New York, described his experience of viewing the film:

One of the great, if all-too-infrequent, pleasures of being a film critic is having your mind blown by a film you didn't expect much from. Such an incident occurred in December 1997, when I was assigned to review Jean Eustache's 1973 film The Mother and the Whore, then beginning a revival engagement at Film Forum. Yes, I'd heard that it was a classic of French cinema, but I wasn't exactly thrilled at catching an early-morning screening of a three-hour-and-thirty-five-minute black-and-white foreign-language film that reportedly consisted of little more than people sitting around and talking. Frankly, I was a lot more excited about seeing Scream 2 that evening. Little did I know, as I eased into my seat, that I was in for one of the most memorable cinematic experiences of my life.

After a 2016 retrospective screening at the French Institute Alliance Française, film critic Richard Brody effusively praised Eustache's sophisticated portrayal of characters whose "intimate disasters have the feel of epic clashes." Further, he sees the film as Eustache's "comprehensive vision" of radical politics and the Sexual Revolution in post-1968 France – a stark, regretful, and suspicious vision that Brody terms "ferociously conservative".

The film was adapted into a 1990 stage play by Jean-Louis Martinelli. In 1996, the French rock band Diabologum utilized Veronika's monologue in a song titled "La maman et la putain" on their album #3. Vincent Dieutre's 2008 film ea2, 2e exercice d'admiration: Jean Eustache paid tribute to Veronika's monologue.
