= Diabologum =

French rock band

- Origin: Toulouse, France
- Genres: Rock
- Years active: 1993–1998
- Labels: Lithium
- Past members: Michel Cloup; Arnaud Michniak; Denis Degioanni

Diabologum was a French rock group of the 1990s from Toulouse (Occitania) founded by Michel Cloup (Peter) and Arnaud Michniak (Tadz).

Their three albums were a mixture of noisy rock, sophisticated pop, and experimental collage. Inspired by the Dadaists, the Situationists, Sonic Youth, Hip Hop, and Codeine, they ended up creating their own style on #3, their last album, by replacing song by spoken texts accompanied by howling, but nonetheless melodic, guitars, together with various samples. This last album was an inspiration to French rock.

They eventually split up in 1998. Michel Cloup joined Expérience, while Arnaud Michniak joined Programme. Experience issued an LP under the name Binary Audio Misfits. Michel Cloup and the drummer Patrice Cartier issued then 'Notre Silence' in 2011.

In October 2011, Diabologum made a unique concert in Vendôme, with Françoise Lebrun (voice of La maman et la putain) as a surprise guest.

== Discography ==
- C'était un lundi après-midi semblable aux autres (1993) - Lithium
- Le Goût du jour (1994) - Lithium
- #3 (1996) - Lithium
- Split EP avec Manta Ray (1997) - La Ultima historia de seduccion
