= The Thread That Keeps Us =

Studio album by Calexico
- Released: January 26, 2018
- Length: 44:35
- Label: Anti-
- Producer: Joey Burns; Craig Schumacher

Calexico chronology
Edge of the Sun (2015)	The Thread That Keeps Us (2018)	Years to Burn (2019)

The Thread That Keeps Us is the ninth studio album by American indie rock band Calexico. It was released on January 26, 2018, under Anti-.

== Critical reception ==
Professional ratings
Aggregate scores
Source	Rating
Metacritic	78/100
Review scores
Source	Rating
AllMusic	4/5 stars
Blurt	4/5 stars
Drowned in Sound	6/10
Exclaim!	4/10
Pitchfork	7.1/10
Under the Radar	7.5/10

The Thread That Keeps Us was described as "impassioned stories about border politics and environmental disasters" by Pitchfork, also describing it as "comfort food" that is "vital in spite of that familiarity." Exclaim! described it as an "overly long record" with "truly enjoyable moments."

== Track listing ==
No.	Title	Writer(s)	Length
1.	"End of the World with You"	Joey Burns	3:08
2.	"Voices in the Field"	Joey Burns; John Burns	3:26
3.	"Bridge to Nowhere"	Joey Burns	3:07
4.	"Spinball"	Joey Burns; Scott Colberg; John Convertino	1:11
5.	"Under the Wheels"	Joey Burns; Sergio Mendoza	3:23
6.	"The Town & Miss Lorraine"	Joey Burns	2:39
7.	"Flores y Tamales"	Joey Burns; Jairo Zavala	2:47
8.	"Another Space"	Joey Burns	3:55
9.	"Unconditional Waltz"	Martin Wenk	1:38
10.	"Girl in the Forest"	Joey Burns	2:45
11.	"Eyes Wide Awake"	Joey Burns; John Burns; John Convertino	4:20
12.	"Dead in the Water"	Joey Burns	2:37
13.	"Shortboard"	Joey Burns; Scott Colberg; John Convertino	1:57
14.	"Thrown to the Wild"	Joey Burns; John Burns	4:47
15.	"Music Box"	Joey Burns	2:55

iTunes Deluxe Edition
No.	Title	Length
1.	"Longboard"	3:02
2.	"Luna Roja"	3:43
3.	"Curse of the Ride"	2:51
4.	"Lost Inside"	4:30
5.	"Inside the Energy Field"	1:17
6.	"End of the Night"	3:29
7.	"Dream on Mount Tam"	3:43

== Charts ==
Chart (2018)	Peak position
Austrian Albums (Ö3 Austria)	9
Belgian Albums (Ultratop Wallonia)	49
Belgian Albums (Ultratop Flanders)	13
French Albums (SNEP)	71
German Albums (Offizielle Top 100)	7
Italian Albums (FIMI)	60
Portuguese Albums (AFP)	43
Spanish Albums (PROMUSICAE)	43
UK Albums (OCC)	58
US Top Album Sales (Billboard)	53
US Independent Albums (Billboard)	12
US Folk Albums (Billboard)	10

== Personnel ==
Musicians

- Joey Burns – vocals, guitar, producer
- Scott Colberg – bass
- Sergio Mendoza – keyboards
- Jacob Valenzuela – backing vocals, trumpet
- Jairo Zavala – guitar, backing vocals
- Martin Wenk – drums, trumpet
- John Convertino – drums
- Johnny Contreras – backing vocals
- Evan Shelton – cello

Production

- Craig Schumacher – engineer, producer
- Tom Hagerman – engineer
- Thomas Small – engineer
- JJ Golden – mastering
