= Seasonal Shift =

Studio album by Calexico
- Released: December 4, 2020
- Length: 42:23
- Label: Anti-

Calexico chronology
Years to Burn (2019)	Seasonal Shift (2020)	El Mirador (2022)

Professional ratings
Aggregate scores
Source	Rating
Metacritic	67/100
Review scores
Source	Rating
American Songwriter	3/5 stars
Evening Standard	4/5 stars
The Line of Best Fit	7.5/10

Seasonal Shift is the eleventh studio album by the American band Calexico. It was released on December 4, 2020, via Anti-.

== Track listing ==
Seasonal Shift track listing
No.	Title	Writer(s)	Length
1.	"Hear the Bells"	Joseph Burns	3:52
2.	"Christmas All Over Again" (featuring Nick Urata)	Tom Petty	3:37
3.	"Mi Burrito Sabanero" (featuring Gaby Moreno)	Hugo Blanco	4:05
4.	"Heart of Downtown" (featuring Bombino)	Burns; Sergio Mendoza	3:49
5.	"Seasonal Shift"	Burns	3:22
6.	"Nature's Domain"	Burns	2:56
7.	"Happy Xmas (War Is Over)"	John Lennon; Yoko Ono	4:01
8.	"Glory's Hope"	John Convertino	2:47
9.	"Tanta Tristeza" (featuring Gisela João)	Burns; Mendoza	3:49
10.	"Peace of Mind"	Burns	3:22
11.	"Sonoran Snoball" (featuring Camilo Lara)	Camilo Lara; Burns; Mendoza	3:07
12.	"Mi Burrito Sabanero – Reprise"	Blanco	3:36
Total length:			42:23

== Charts ==
Chart performance for Seasonal Shift
Chart (2020)	Peak position
Belgian Albums (Ultratop Flanders)	55
