= Mostly Bears =

American indie rock band

- Origin: Tucson, Arizona, United States
- Genres: Indie rock
- Years active: 2006-2011
- Labels: Funzalo Records
- Past members: Brian Lopez; Geoffrey Hidalgo; Nick Wantland

Mostly Bears were an American indie rock group from Tucson, Arizona. Their music is a difficult to categorize fusion between alternative, progressive and newer indie rock, like "Radiohead circa 1996 getting in a gang-fight with Arcade Fire."

The band began playing at parties (including headlining 2007's Harvest Artfest) and locally in Tucson before releasing Only Child, a four-song EP in July 2007. The album was well received by local press and has begun to attract a following on college campuses from coast to coast. Tucson Weekly called them the 'Best New Band or Artist' of 2007.

Following a West Coast tour, they released what would be their only studio album The Ed Mitchell Clinic on April 22, 2008. They released the songs "Melancholyism" and "Eclipse the World (Oh, My Brain)" in support of the album, and released a live album in 2009 called Team of Spirits. Following this and the end of their tour, the band quietly dissolved as Brian Lopez and Geoffrey Hidalgo went on to work on side projects.

== Members ==
- Brian Lopez — guitar, vocals
- Geoffrey Hidalgo — bass, backing vocals
- Nick Wantland — drums, percussion

== Discography ==
- Only Child (Extended play) (2007)
- The Ed Mitchell Clinic (Studio album) (2008)
- Team of Spirits (Live album) (2009)

The music video for "Peoples Distinctive Travels" is available in HD at: http://www.vimeo.com/935465
