= Ceci Bastida =

Mexican singer-songwriter

- Origin: Tijuana, Baja California, México
- Label: Nacional
- Website: www.cecibastidamusic.com

Ceci Bastida is a Mexican singer-songwriter.

Ceci was born in Tijuana, Baja California, México. and is well known for playing keyboards and vocals in Mexico's punk rock band Tijuana No! at the age of 15. Bastida also played keyboards for former Tijuana No! band member Julieta Venegas and is currently a key member of Mexrrissey, Mexican tribute band to The Smiths.

== Solo career ==
Tijuana No! was later disbanded in 2002, both lead singer Julieta Venegas and Ceci Bastida continued to work on personal projects. Ceci played keyboards in Julieta Venegas band and later left in 2008. In 2010 she released her first album, Veo La Marea. Veo La Marea was nominated for a Latin Grammy.

Her second album La Edad de La Violencía was released 24 June 2014. She released the EP Un Sueño in 2016.
