= Tool Box (Calexico album) =

Studio album by Calexico
- Released: 2007
- Genre: Americana, indie rock, Tex-Mex, post-rock
- Label: Our Soil, Our Strength

Tool Box is a compilation of instrumental songs by Arizona indie rock band Calexico. Released in 2007, the album was made available to purchase during their tour, and eventually, on their official website. Aside from a version of "The News About William" (w/ vocals) on 2008's Carried To Dust, none of these songs were ever released on any of their official studio albums.

== Track listing ==
1. "Above the Branch" (Burns, Convertino)
2. "When Bellows Crack" (Burns, Convertino)
3. "Lo-Fi Moon" (Burns)
4. "Barcelona Mosaico" (Burns, Convertino)
5. "Hair Like Spanish Moss" (Burns)
6. "Vinyassa" (Convertino)
7. "The News About William" (Burns, Convertino)
8. "The Road Back" (Burns, Convertino)
9. "In The Quiet" (Burns)
10. "Maria Chuchena" (Burns)
11. "Waitomo" (Burns, Convertino)
12. "Detroit Steam" (Burns, Convertino)
13. "Departure in F Minor" (Burns)
14. "When Only the Ashes Are Left" (Burns, Convertino)

== Personnel ==
- Joey Burns: Guitar, Upright Bass, Piano, Accordion, Cello, Waylacho, Cuatro, Banjo
- John Convertino: Drums, Vibes, Piano, Glockenspiel, Percussion

== Production ==
- Recorded by Mike Prado, Big Block
- Mixed by Craig Schumacher, Wavelab Studio
- Mastered by Jim Blackwood, KUAT
