= The Ed Mitchell Clinic =

Studio album by Mostly Bears
- Released: April 22, 2008
- Genre: Indie rock, alternative rock, progressive rock
- Length: 48:43
- Label: Funzalo Records
- Producer: Fred Huang, Nick Luca

Mostly Bears chronology
The Ed Mitchell Clinic (2008)	Team of Spirits Live Album (2009)

The Ed Mitchell Clinic is the only studio album by the Tucson-based indie rock trio Mostly Bears, having been released by Funzalo Records in 2008. The title of the album references the former British television personality Ed Mitchell, and presumably the rehabilitation clinic that he attended in order to again work at Independent Television News. The songs "Melancholyism" and "Eclipse the World (Oh, My Brain)" were issued as singles from the album.

Professional ratings
Review scores
Source	Rating
Allmusic	link
Arizona Daily Wildcat	link
PopMatters	link
Space City Rock	(Highly Positive) link

== Production ==
During development and recording of the album, the band were allowed to experiment and practice with various instruments, such as the glockenspiel, the gu-zheng and the Omnichord. The experimentation also branched off into generally non-musical objects. An example can be heard on the song "Airports", where the percussion includes implementation of a bathroom sink. According to the members, they enjoyed recording in the studio bathroom because of the "natural reverberation" that occurred when playing.

== Track listing ==
All songs written by Mostly Bears, except "Melancholyism" which was cowritten with Fred Huang.

1. "The Digital Divide" - 3:10
2. "Leda Atómica" - 4:26
3. "Airports" - 5:16
4. "The Pharmacist" - 7:32
5. "The Stationary Divide" - 3:54
6. "Eclipse the World (Oh, My Brain) - 6:21
7. "Melancholyism" - 4:21
8. "Maslow's Hierarchy" - 3:41
9. "Your Smile Decorates the Afternoon" - 4:50
10. "Passeig de Gracia" - 4:10
