= Edge of the Sun =

Studio album by Calexico
- Released: April 13, 2015
- Genre: Americana
- Length: 40:35
- Label: Anti-
- Producers: Joey Burns, John Convertino, Sergio Mendoza, Craig Schumacher

Calexico chronology
| Algiers (2012) | Edge of the Sun (2015) | The Thread That Keeps Us (2018) |

Professional ratings
Aggregate scores
| Source | Rating |
|---|---|
| Metacritic | 78/100 |
Review scores
| Source | Rating |
| AllMusic | 3.5/5 stars |
| Drowned in Sound | 8/10 |
| musicOMH | 4/5 stars |
| Pitchfork | 7.6/10 |

Edge of the Sun is the eighth studio album by indie rock band Calexico. It was released in April 2015 on Anti- and was the band’s first UK Top 40 success.

== Accolades ==
| Publication | Accolade | Year | Rank |
|---|---|---|---|
| Rough Trade | Albums of the Year 2015 | 2015 | 21 |

== Track listing ==
| No. | Title | Writer(s) | Featuring | Length |
|---|---|---|---|---|
| 1. | "Falling from the Sky" | Joey Burns, John Burns | Ben Bridwell | 3:23 |
| 2. | "Bullets & Rocks" | Joey Burns, John Burns, John Convertino | Sam Beam | 3:30 |
| 3. | "When the Angels Played" | Pieta Brown, Joey Burns | Pieta Brown, Greg Leisz | 2:25 |
| 4. | "Tapping on the Line" | Joey Burns, John Burns | Neko Case | 3:28 |
| 5. | "Cumbia de Donde" | Joey Burns, Sergio Mendoza | Amparo Sánchez | 3:09 |
| 6. | "Miles from the Sea" | Joey Burns, John Burns, John Convertino | Gaby Moreno | 3:41 |
| 7. | "Coyoacán" | Joey Burns, John Convertino, Sergio Mendoza | | 3:03 |
| 8. | "Beneath the City of Dreams" | Joey Burns, John Burns, John Convertino, Sergio Mendoza, Jairo Zavala | Gaby Moreno | 2:35 |
| 9. | "Woodshed Waltz" | Joey Burns, John Burns, John Convertino | Greg Leisz | 3:29 |
| 10. | "Moon Never Rises" | Joey Burns, John Convertino | Carla Morrison | 3:28 |
| 11. | "World Undone" | Joey Burns | Takim | 4:29 |
| 12. | "Follow the River" | Joey Burns, John Burns, John Convertino, Sergio Mendoza | Nick Urata | 3:54 |

Edge of the Sun — Special edition bonus tracks
| No. | Title | Writer(s) | Featuring | Length |
|---|---|---|---|---|
| 13. | "Calavera" | Joey Burns, Sergio Mendoza |
| 14. | "Roll Tango" | Joey Burns, John Burns, John Convertino | Panagiotis Dimitrakopoulos, Thomas Konstantinou, Yorgos Marinakis, Eric Burdon |
| 15. | "Rosco Y Pancetta" | Joey Burns, John Convertino, Sergio Mendoza | Tom Hagerman, Adrian Perez, José "El Niño" Márquez, Antonio Pro |
| 16. | "Volviendo" | Joey Burns, John Convertino, Sergio Mendoza | Inti Illimani |
| 17. | "Esperanza" | Jacob Valenzuela, Salvador Duran | Antonio Pro, Jacob Valenzuela, Salvador Duran |
| 18. | "Let It Slip Away" | Joey Burns | Hollie Fullbrook |

== Personnel ==
Calexico

- Ryan Alfred – upright and electric bass, synth, ambient guitar, vocals
- Joey Burns – vocals, guitars, banjo, piano, organ, harmonica, cello, congas, accordion, shaker, ukulele, bass
- John Convertino – drums, percussion
- Sergio Mendoza – mellotron strings, percussion, piano, organ, backing vocals, vibes, guitar, vihuela, accordion, ukulele
- Paul Niehaus – pedal steel
- Jacob Valenzuela – trumpet
- Martin Wenk – trumpet, synth, vibes
- Jairo Zavala – guitar, bass

Additional musicians

- Sam Beam – vocals on "Bullets and Rocks"
- Ben Bridwell – vocals on "Falling from the Sky"
- Pieta Brown – vocals on "When The Angels Played"
- Neko Case – vocals on "Tapping on the Line"
- Tom Hagerman – strings on "Miles from the Sea" and "Coyoacan"
- Steff Koeppen – additional vocals on "Tapping on the Line"
- Thomas Konstantinou of Takim – lute and bouzouki on "World Undone"
- Greg Leisz – pedal steel on "When The Angels Played", guitar on "Woodshed Waltz"
- Yorgos Marinakis of Takim - traditional violin on "World Undone"
- Gaby Moreno – vocals on "Miles from the Sea" and "Beneath the City of Dreams"
- Carla Morrison – vocals on "Moon Never Rises"
- Adrian Perez – jalisco harp on "Bullets and Rocks" and "Coyoacan"
- Antonio Pro – guitarron on "Coyoacan"
- Isaac Rodriguez – additional vocals on "Cumbia de Donde"
- Amparo Sánchez – vocals on "Cumbia de Donde"
- Chris Schultz – percussion on "Falling from the Sky", additional vocals on "Cumbia de Donde"
- Craig Schumacher – moog bass on "World Undone"
- Nick Urata – vocals on "Follow the River"

== Charts ==
| Chart | Peak position |
|---|---|
| UK Albums (OCC) | 37 |
| US Billboard 200 | 193 |
| US Top Rock Albums (Billboard) | 25 |
| US Alternative Albums (Billboard) | 19 |
| US Americana/Folk Albums (Billboard) | 6 |
| US Independent Albums (Billboard) | 12 |
| US Tastemakers (Billboard) | 17 |
