= Tijuana No! =

Mexican ska punk band

Tijuana No
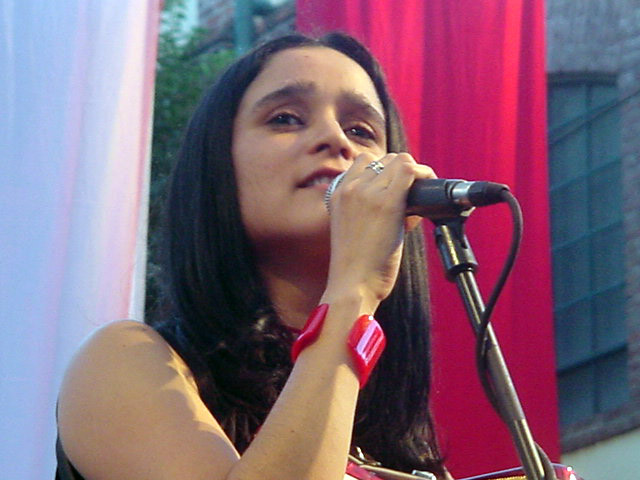
- Julieta Venegas ex member.

Background information
- Origin: Tijuana, Baja California, Mexico
- Genres: Ska
- Years active: 1989–present
- Members: Luis Güereña (deceased); Teca García; Jorge Velázquez; Jorge Jiménez; Alejandro Zúñiga
- Past members: Julieta Venegas (vocals); Cecilia Bastida (vocals)

Tijuana No! is a Mexican ska, rock and punk band from Tijuana, Baja California, Mexico. In the beginning their name was Radio Chantaje (Blackmail Radio), and later they became No, but upon the knowledge of another band called the same, they changed their name to No de Tijuana (No from Tijuana), and later just shortened it to Tijuana No!. They were characterized by the social criticism in their lyrics, where they also showed their support to the EZLN, and made reference in their songs to racial, cultural, international, and governmental problems, like the immigration policies in the United States. In 1991 they recorded their first album under an independent label, and one year later (1992) they released the same album (with some design changes) under Culebra Records (BMG), who gave them international recognition promoting the single Pobre de Ti (Poor You).

In its early stages they had the participation of Mexican singer Julieta Venegas, who left the band and started a solo career. Luis Güereña, one of the three singers in the group died in 2004 due to a heart attack while he was watching television at his home in Tijuana. He was discovered by one of his best friends, Paul Thomas, of No Cover Magazine. Thomas tried to revive Güereña to no avail.

The group officially disbanded in December 2002, although they occasionally met to pay tribute to their companion Luis Güereña.

== Members ==
- Cecilia Bastida – keyboards and vocals
- Luis Güereña – percussion and vocals (deceased)
- Teca García – percussion, vocals and flutes
- Jorge Velázquez – bass and backing vocals
- Jorge Jiménez – guitar
- Alejandro Zúñiga – drums
- Dardin Coria – keyboards
- DJ Tijuas – turntables
- Julieta Venegas – vocals, acoustic guitar, accordion and keyboard

== Discography ==
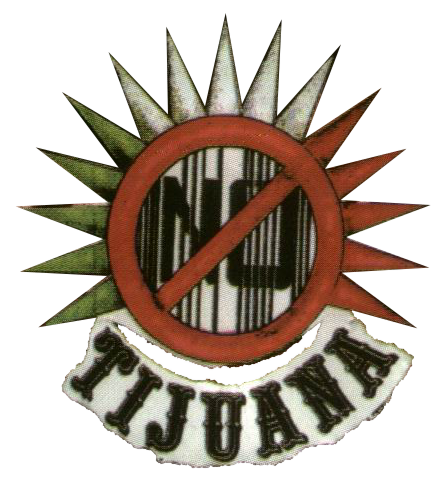
Logo

- Indefinicion 1990 Demo cassette
- NO – 1991 (Rock and Roll Circus (Independent Label))
- NO – 1992 (Culebra)(BMG). With the participation of Rocco and Sax (Maldita Vecindad), Dennis Parker (Haragan y Compania) and Manu Chao.
- Transgresores de la Ley – 1994 (Culebra) (BMG). With the participation of Manu Chao, Fermin Muguruza and Todos Tus Muertos.
- Contra Revolución Avenue – 1998 (BMG Latin). With the participation of Kid Frost.
- Rock del Milenio – 1999 (BMG Latin)
- Live at Bilbao, Spain – 2000 (BMG Latin)
- Lo Mejor de Tijuana NO! – 2001 (BMG Latin)
