= Vingt à Trente Mille Jours =

Studio album by Françoiz Breut
- Released: 2000
- Recorded: 2000
- Genre: Chanson, Indie pop
- Length: 51:01
- Label: Lithium, Bella Union

Françoiz Breut chronology
Françoiz Breut (1997)	Vingt à Trente Mille Jours (2000)	Une Saison Volée (2005)

Professional ratings
Review scores
Source	Rating
AllMusic	2.5/5 stars
Pitchfork	7.4/10

Vingt à Trente Mille Jours (French for "Twenty to Thirty Thousand Days") is the second album by French singer Françoiz Breut, released in 2000.

== Critical reception ==
Exclaim! wrote that "most songs have a melancholy feel—there's nothing that could be described as upbeat and the majority of them crawl along at a pace slightly faster than that of a snail."

== Track listing ==
1. Derrière le grand filtre (Philippe Poirier) – 5:52
2. Si tu disais (Dominique Ané / Dominique Ané – Gaëtan Chataigner – Sacha Toorop – Pierre Bondu) – 2:23
3. L'Affaire d'un jour (Dominique Ané / Dominique Ané – Gaëtan Chataigner – Sacha Toorop) – 3:43
4. Portsmouth (Dominique Ané) – 2:56
5. L'Origine du monde (Philippe Katerine) – 2:46
6. Vingt à trente mille jours (Dominique Ané / Dominique Ané – Gaëtan Chataigner – Sacha Toorop) – 5:02
7. La Chanson d'Hélène (Jean-Loup Dabadie/Philippe Sarde) – 3:50
8. Silhouette minuscule (Jérôme Minière) – 4:13
9. Sans souci (Peggy Lee/Sonny Burke) – 3:09
10. La Nuit repose (Dominique Ané / Dominique Ané – Gaëtan Chataigner – Sacha Toorop – Yann Tiersen) – 3:20
11. L'Heure bleue (Dominique Ané / Dominique Ané – Françoiz Breut – Luc Rambaud – Yann Tiersen – Sacha Toorop) – 4:22
12. Il n'y a pas d'hommes dans les coulisses (Dominique Ané / Dominique Ané – Gaëtan Chataigner – Yann Tiersen – Françoiz Breut – Sacha Toorop) – 2:34
13. Le Verre pilé (Dominique Ané / Dominique Ané – Sacha Toorop – Luc Rambo – Yann Tiersen) – 4:37
14. Je ne veux pas quitter (Dominique Ané / Dominique Ané – Françoiz Breut – Yann Tiersen – Gaëtan Chataigner – Sacha Toorop) – 1:53

=== Bonus CD, available with first edition only ===
1. Intro (?) – 0:20
2. Departures (Isabelle Casier) – 3:21
3. Les Bras le long du lit (Dominique Ané / Dominique Ané – Gaëtan Chataigner – Sacha Toorop) – 3:46
4. The Lease (Sarah Froning / Eric Deleporte) – 3:04
5. Je ne veux pas m'éloigner (Je ne veux pas quitter II) (Dominique Ané / Dominique Ané – Françoiz Breut – Yann Tiersen – Gaëtan Chataigner – Sacha Toorop) – 3:35

(C) Labels/Virgin France SA 2000 – CD album (7243 8499462 4) + bonus (7243 8499982 7) [19 September 2000] (C) BELLACD25 – BellaUnion CD – [2001/03/12]
