= Algiers (Calexico album) =

Studio album by Calexico
- Released: September 11, 2012
- Studios: The Living Room, Algiers, Louisiana; Wavelab, Tucson, Arizona; Studio Calexico, Tucson, Arizona
- Genres: Alternative rock, indie folk, Americana, Tex-Mex, alt-country, post-rock
- Length: 46:34
- Label: Anti-
- Producers: Joey Burns, John Convertino, Craig Schumacher

Calexico chronology
Carried to Dust (2008)	Algiers (2012)	Edge of the Sun (2015)

Singles from Algiers
- 1. "Splitter" Released: 2012

Professional ratings
Aggregate scores
Source	Rating
Metacritic	76/100
Review scores
Source	Rating
AllMusic	3.5/5 stars
The A.V. Club	A−
Blurt	9/10 stars
Clash Music	8/10 stars
Consequence of Sound	2.5/5 stars
The Independent	4/5 stars
Paste	7/10 stars
Pitchfork	7.3 stars on a 10-point scale
Under the Radar	7.5/10 stars

Algiers is the seventh studio album by indie rock Americana band Calexico, released on September 11, 2012.

The album's name comes from Algiers, New Orleans, which is where the album was recorded.

== Track listing ==
All songs written by Joey Burns & John Convertino, except "Fortune Teller" by Joey Burns & Pieta Brown, and "No Te Vayas" by Jacob Valenzuela.

No.	Title	Length
1.	"Epic"	4:14
2.	"Splitter"	3:30
3.	"Sinner in the Sea"	4:14
4.	"Fortune Teller"	3:57
5.	"Para"	3:53
6.	"Algiers"	3:42
7.	"Maybe on Monday"	3:37
8.	"Puerto"	4:23
9.	"Better and Better"	2:33
10.	"No Te Vayas"	4:15
11.	"Hush"	4:22
12.	"The Vanishing Mind"	3:54
13.	"Dead Moon (deluxe edition bonus track)"	3:37
14.	"Mi Maquina (deluxe edition bonus track)"	3:09
15.	"Ghost of a River (deluxe edition bonus track)"	3:57

In some releases a bonus disc was included, entitled "Spiritoso," which featured the band playing their songs accompanied by the Radio Symphonie Orchester Wien and the Deutsches Filmorchester Babelsberg, conducted by Cornelius Meister and Matt Dunkley respectively.

No.	Title	Length
1.	"Frontera/Trigger"	5:30
2.	"Epic"	4:25
3.	"The News About William"	3:46
4.	"Black Heart"	4:54
5.	"Minas de Cobre"	3:41
6.	"Inspiración"	3:30
7.	"Two Silver Trees"	4:31
8.	"Para"	3:53
9.	"Quattro (World Drifts In)"	4:46
10.	"Crystal Frontier"	7:52
11.	"The Vanishing Mind"	4:26
12.	"Fortune Teller"	4:36
Total length:		55:54

Tracks 1,8 and 11 performed with the Radio Symphonie Orchester Wien; tracks 2, 3, 4, 5, 6, 7, 9, 10 and 12 performed with the Deutsches Filmorchester Babelsberg

== Personnel ==
Calexico

- John Convertino – drums, percussion, vibraphone
- Joey Burns – vocals, guitars, upright bass, piano, Vibes, Keys, Accordion

Additional musicians

- Jacob Valenzuela – trumpet, vocals (1, 2, 3, 5, 6, 8, 10, 12)
- Martin Wenk – trumpet, Wurlitzer, sampled strings, accordion, theremin (1, 2, 3, 5, 6, 7, 11, 12)
- Paul Niehaus – pedal steel (3, 5, 6, 11, 12)
- Jairo Zavala – vocals, slide guitar, bazouki, acoustic guitar, percussion (6, 8, 10)
- Volker Zander – upright bass, electric bass (1, 2, 11, 12)
- Craig Schumacher – Mellotron, percussion, Wurlitzer (1, 3, 5, 7)
- Sergio Mendoza – piano (3, 8, 10)
- Michael Carbajal – trumpet (8, 10)
- Michael Fan – violin (11, 12)
- Rose Todaro – violin (11, 12)
- Joseph Pagan – viola (11, 12)
- Anne Gratz – cello (11, 12)
- Craig Klein – trombone (3)
- Jason Mingledorff – tenor and baritone saxophone (2)
- Pieta Brown – backing vocals (4)
- Tom Hagerman – violins, viola (5)
- Chris Lopez – baritone trombone (8)
- Chris Schultz – Moog synth for pedal steel (11)

== Charts ==
Chart	Peak position
UK Albums (OCC)	60
US Billboard 200	72
US Top Rock Albums (Billboard)	30
US Alternative Albums (Billboard)	19
US Americana/Folk Albums (Billboard)	6
US Independent Albums (Billboard)	19
US Tastemakers (Billboard)	8

In 2012, it was awarded a double silver certification from the Independent Music Companies Association, which indicated sales of at least 40,000 copies throughout Europe.
