= The Black Light (Calexico album) =

Studio album by Calexico
- Released: May 19, 1998
- Recorded: Wavelab Studios, Tucson, Arizona in July, August & December 1997, except 2,4 & 11 at the homes of Burns and Convertino
- Genres: Americana, indie rock, Tex-Mex, post-rock
- Length: 54:09
- Label: Quarterstick
- Producers: Joey Burns & John Convertino

Calexico chronology
Spoke (1996)	The Black Light (1998)	Hot Rail (2000)

Singles from The Black Light
- 1. "Stray" Released: 1998; 2. "The Ride (Part 2)" Released: 1998

Professional ratings
Review scores
Source	Rating
AllMusic	4.5/5 stars
The Boston Phoenix	3.5/4 stars
Encyclopedia of Popular Music	4/5 stars
Mojo	4/5 stars
NME	7/10
Pitchfork	8.5/10
Uncut	9/10

The Black Light is the second studio album by American indie rock band Calexico. It was released May 19, 1998 on Quarterstick.

== Track listing ==
No.	Title	Writer(s)	Length
1.	"Gypsy's Curse"	Joey Burns	4:18
2.	"Fake Fur"	Joey Burns	2:36
3.	"The Ride (Part 2)"	Joey Burns	3:08
4.	"Where Water Flows"	Joey Burns, John Convertino	1:57
5.	"The Black Light"	Joey Burns, John Convertino	3:20
6.	"Sideshow"	Joey Burns, John Convertino	2:02
7.	"Chach"	Joey Burns, John Convertino	3:33
8.	"Missing"	Joey Burns	6:01
9.	"Minas de Cobre (For Better Metal)"	Joey Burns	3:09
10.	"Over Your Shoulder"	Joey Burns	4:10
11.	"Vinegaroon"	Joey Burns, John Convertino	1:06
12.	"Trigger"	Joey Burns	2:34
13.	"Sprawl"	John Convertino	1:27
14.	"Stray"	Joey Burns	2:54
15.	"Old Man Waltz"	John Convertino	2:29
16.	"Bloodflow"	Joey Burns	5:10
17.	"Frontera"	Joey Burns	4:21
Total length:			54:09

The Black Light — 20th Anniversary edition bonus disc
No.	Title	Length
1.	"El Morro"	4:44
2.	"Man Goes Where Water Flows"	4:18
3.	"Glowing Heart of the World"	4:49
4.	"Too Much Sprawl"	6:55
5.	"Rollbar"	5:01
6.	"Minas De Cobre (Extend-O-Mix)"	6:18
7.	"Minas De Cobre (Spatial Mix)"	4:16
8.	"Minas De Cobre (Acoustic Mix)"	2:16
9.	"Lacquer"	4:00
10.	"Drape"	4:15
11.	"Bag of Death"	1:45
Total length:		48:37

== Personnel ==
Calexico

- Joey Burns – vocals, double bass, guitar, cello, mandolin, accordion, keyboards, steel guitar, percussion
- John Convertino – drums, vibraphone, marimba, accordion, percussion, thunder drum

Additional personnel

- Howe Gelb – piano, organ
- Nick Luca – Spanish guitar, claves
- Gabriel Landin – gitaron
- Neil Harry – pedal steel guitar
- Bridget Keating – violin
- Rigo Pedroza – trumpet
- Fernando Sanchez – trumpet
- Al Tapatio – trumpet
- Tasha Bundy – background vocals
- Stephanie Nelson – fuzz vox
- Craig Schumacher – engineering
- Nick Luca – engineering

Mixed at Wavelab Studios, Tucson, Arizona.
