= Garden Ruin =

Studio album by Calexico
- Released: April 11, 2006
- Genres: Indie rock, indie folk, alt-country, Tex-Mex
- Length: 40:31
- Label: Quarterstick Records
- Producers: JD Foster, Joey Burns, John Convertino

Calexico chronology
Feast of Wire (2003)	Garden Ruin (2006)	Carried to Dust (2008)

Singles from Garden Ruin
- 1. "Cruel" Released: 2006; 2. "Bisbee Ruin" Released: 2006

Professional ratings
Aggregate scores
Source	Rating
Metacritic	75/100
Review scores
Source	Rating
AllMusic	4/5 stars
The A.V. Club	B+
Entertainment Weekly	B+
The Guardian	4/5 stars
Pitchfork	8.1/10
PopMatters	6/10
The Skinny	4/5 stars
Slant Magazine	3.5/5 stars
Spin	3.5/5 stars
Uncut	4/5

Garden Ruin is the fifth studio album by the rock band Calexico. It was released in 2006 on Quarterstick Records. The LP is the first Calexico album to feature no instrumental tracks, instead relying on a more direct, pop-style approach. Forgoing what has been described as "indie-mariachi", the band took their music in a different direction, and the result is a more straightforward indie rock album.

As of 2009 it has sold 46,000 copies in US.

== Track listing ==
No.	Title	Writer(s)	Length
1.	"Cruel"	Joey Burns, John Burns	3:59
2.	"Yours and Mine"	Joey Burns, John Convertino	2:30
3.	"Bisbee Blue"	Joey Burns, John Burns, JD Foster, John Convertino, Dan Coleman	2:48
4.	"Panic Open String"	Joey Burns, John Convertino	4:09
5.	"Letter to Bowie Knife"	Joey Burns, John Burns	3:06
6.	"Roka (Danza de la Muerte)"	Joey Burns	3:42
7.	"Lucky Dime"	Joey Burns, John Convertino	2:33
8.	"Smash"	Joey Burns, John Burns	3:45
9.	"Deep Down"	Joey Burns	4:31
10.	"Nom de Plume"	Paul Niehaus, Joey Burns	3:19
11.	"All Systems Red"	Joey Burns, John Convertino, JD Foster	6:09
12.	"Landing Field" (bonus track)	Joey Burns, JD Foster	3:46
13.	"Cast Your Coat" (bonus track)	Joey Burns	3:46
Total length:			40:31

== Musicians ==
- John Convertino – Drums (1–11), Percussion (6), Shakers (10)
- Joey Burns – Acoustic Guitar (1–11), Electric Guitar (1,3–9,11), Vocals (1–11), Piano (1,8,11), Tambourine (1,3,4), Cello (2), Banjo (3), Wurlitzer (3,7,8), Casio Flute (4), Glockenspiel (4), Shaker (4), Bass (5,9), Backup Vocals (5), Vibes (6), Bass Melodica (7), Organ (9), Accordion (10)
- Volker Zander – Electric Bass (1,3,6–8,10), Vibes (9)
- Martin Wenk – Glockenspiel (1), Trumpet (1,3,6), Wurlitzer (3), Nashville Tuning Guitar (3), Electric Guitar (9,11), Banjo (10), Noise (11)
- Jacob Valenzuela – Trumpet (1,3,6)
- JD Foster – Nashville Tuning Guitar (1,3), Horn Arrangement (1,6), Electric Guitar (1), Banjo Ukulele (3), Mando Bird (3), Electric Bass (4,11), Sleigh Bells (4), Backup Vocals (5), Fender Rhodes Bass (11)
- Rob Burger – Hammond B3 Organ (1)
- Paul Niehaus – Pedal Steel (1,8), Electric Guitar (1,7,9–11), Baritone Guitar (6)
- Nelzimar Neves – Cello (3)
- Dan Coleman – Cello Arrangement (3)
- Naim Amor – Electric Guitar (5)
- Jelle Kuiper – Shakers (6), Thunder Drum (10)
- Nick Luca – Hammond B3 Organ (6), Electric Jazz Guitar (7), Reverse Wurlitzer (11)
- Eldys Isak Vega – Piano (6)
- Roberto Mendoza – Sound Effects (6)
- Amparo Sanchez – Vocals (6)

== Charts ==
Chart	Peak position
UK Albums (OCC)	76
US Billboard 200	156
US Heatseekers Albums (Billboard)	3
US Independent Albums (Billboard)	14
US Tastemakers (Billboard)	6
