= Feast of Wire =

Studio album by Calexico
- Released: February 18, 2003
- Studios: Wavelab Studio, Tucson, Arizona
- Genres: Alternative rock; alternative country; mariachi
- Length: 49:44
- Label: Quarterstick
- Producers: Joey Burns, John Convertino, Craig Schumacher

Calexico chronology
Hot Rail (2000)	Feast of Wire (2003)	Garden Ruin (2006)

Singles from Feast of Wire
- 1. "Quattro (World Drifts In)" Released: 2003; 2. "Black Heart" Released: 2004

Feast of Wire is the fourth studio album by American indie rock band Calexico. The album was released on February 18, 2003, through Quarterstick Records.

== Reception ==
Professional ratings
Aggregate scores
Source	Rating
Metacritic	86/100
Review scores
Source	Rating
AllMusic	4/5 stars
Alternative Press	5/5
The Boston Phoenix	3/4 stars
Entertainment Weekly	B+
The Guardian	3/5 stars
Mojo	5/5 stars
Pitchfork	8.9/10
Q	4/5 stars
Rolling Stone	3/5 stars
Uncut	4/5 stars

Joe Tangari of Pitchfork called Feast of Wire Calexico's "first genuinely masterful full-length, crammed with immediate songcraft, shifting moods and open-ended exploration," and "the album we always knew they had in them but feared they would never make."

== Track listing ==
No.	Title	Length
0.	Untitled (pregap hidden instrumental track)	2:16
1.	"Sunken Waltz"	2:27
2.	"Quattro (World Drifts In)"	4:36
3.	"Stucco"	0:20
4.	"Black Heart"	4:48
5.	"Pepita"	2:36
6.	"Not Even Stevie Nicks..."	2:42
7.	"Close Behind"	2:51
8.	"Woven Birds"	3:46
9.	"The Book and the Canal"	1:45
10.	"Attack el Robot! Attack!"	3:17
11.	"Across the Wire"	3:25
12.	"Dub Latina"	2:19
13.	"Güero Canelo"	2:57
14.	"Whipping the Horse's Eyes"	1:24
15.	"Crumble"	3:54
16.	"No Doze"	4:21
Total length:		49:44

Limited edition bonus tracks
No.	Title	Length
17.	"Corona" (Minutemen cover)	3:19
18.	"Si tu disais" (Françoiz Breut cover)	3:25
19.	"Fallin' Rain" (Link Wray cover)	5:19
Total length:		1:01:47

== Personnel ==
Credits adapted from CD Universe.

Calexico

- Joey Burns – guitar, upright bass, accordion, percussion, cuatro, cello, orchestra bells, pump organ, mandolin, bowed banjo, vibes, synthesizer, melodica, vocals
- John Convertino – drums, percussion, piano (track 9)
- Paul Niehaus – pedal steel
- Jacob Valenzuela – trumpet (tracks 2, 7, 10, 11, 15)
- Martin Wenk – accordion (tracks 4, 7), trumpet (tracks 7, 11), bowed vibes (track 16)
- Volker Zander – upright bass (tracks 4, 16)

Additional personnel

- Ed Kay – flute (track 15)
- Eddie Lopez – button accordion (track 11)
- Nick Luca – synthesizer (tracks 2, 5, 10), piano (tracks 4, 15), vibes (track 10), electric guitar (track 15)
- Jeff "Fruitpie" Marchant – trombone (track 15)
- Craig Schumacher – synthesizer (tracks 2, 16), tympani (track 7), backup vocals (tracks 1, 2), trumpet (track 2)
- Fernando Valencia – violin (track 11)
- Joseph Valenzuela – trombone (track 2)

== Charts ==
Chart	Peak position
UK Albums (OCC)	71
US Heatseekers Albums (Billboard)	45
US Independent Albums (Billboard)	23
