= Amor Belhom Duo =

- Origin: France
- Genres: Indie rock, Experimental pop, Post-rock, Slowcore, French rock, Indie folk
- Instruments: Vocals, guitar, percussions, drums
- Years active: 1997–2001
- Labels: Ici D'Ailleurs, Wabana Records
- Website: http://www.myspace.com/amorbelhomduo

Amor Belhom Duo was a French avant-pop band based in Tucson, Arizona, active from 1997 to 2002. Their music is noted for its offbeat sensibility, with avant-garde off-kilter strokes of mellow dissonance'. Members were Naïm Amor on vocals, guitars, violin and samplers, Thomas Belhom on percussion, drums, accordion and vocals, both from Paris, France. Singer and filmmaker Marianne Dissard, who was married to Naïm Amor at the time, contributed her lyrics in French and English and music videos. Thomas Belhom have played drums in Tindersticks' album The Hungry Saw and Stuart A. Staples' solo recordings.

== Discography ==
=== Albums ===
- Live in Tucson (2001)
- Amor Belhom Duo (1999)
- Wavelab Performance (1998)

=== Compilations ===
- Ici D'Ailleurs
- Acuarela Records (2001)

=== Collaborations ===
– with Calexico:

- ABBC (Amor/Belhom/Burns/Convertino): "Tête A Tête" (Wabana Records, 2001)
