= Carried to Dust =

Studio album by Calexico
- Released: September 9, 2008
- Genres: Alt-country, Americana, Tex-Mex, indie rock, indie folk
- Length: 45:05
- Label: Quarterstick Records
- Producers: Joey Burns, John Convertino, Craig Schumacher

Calexico chronology
Garden Ruin (2006)	Carried to Dust (2008)	Algiers (2012)

Singles from Carried to Dust
- 1. "Two Silver Trees / Bend to the Road" Released: 2008; 2. "Inspiración / El Gatillo" Released: 2009

Professional ratings
Aggregate scores
Source	Rating
Metacritic	78/100
Review scores
Source	Rating
AllMusic	4.5/5 stars
The A.V. Club	B
ChartAttack	4/5 stars
Pitchfork Media	(8.3/10)
PopMatters	8/10 stars
Spin	3.5/5 stars
Tiny Mix Tapes	3.5/5 stars
Strange Glue	4/5 stars
Twisted Ear	3/5 stars
Web in Front	(favorable)

Carried to Dust is the sixth studio album from Tucson, Arizona indie rock/Americana band Calexico, released September 9, 2008. It features a number of guest musicians like Iron & Wine, Tortoise's Doug McCombs, Pieta Brown, and Amparo Sanchez.

Following the release of Carried to Dust, the band toured throughout the United States, the British Isles and Western Europe.

In 2012 it was awarded a gold certification from the Independent Music Companies Association, which indicated sales of at least 75,000 copies throughout Europe. As of 2009 it has sold 26,000 copies in US.

== Track listing ==
No.	Title	Length
1.	"Víctor Jara's Hands"	3:19
2.	"Two Silver Trees"	3:49
3.	"The News About William"	2:47
4.	"Sarabande in Pencil Form"	0:39
5.	"Writer's Minor Holiday"	3:09
6.	"Man Made Lake"	3:00
7.	"Inspiración"	3:34
8.	"House of Valparaíso"	2:46
9.	"Slowness"	3:35
10.	"Bend to the Road"	3:17
11.	"El Gatillo (Trigger Revisited)"	3:07
12.	"Fractured Air (Tornado Watch)"	3:15
13.	"Falling from Sleeves"	1:20
14.	"Red Blooms"	3:23
15.	"Contention City"	4:16

Written by Joey Burns (1–6,8-15), John Convertino (3–6,10,11,13,15), John Burns (2,3,6,14), Jairo Zavala (1), Jacob Valenzuela (7).

== Personnel ==
- Joey Burns – vocals, guitars, bass, cello, keyboards, accordion, percussion, vibraphone
- John Convertino – drums, percussion, piano
- Paul Niehaus – steel guitar, guitars
- Jacob Valenzuela – trumpet, keyboards, vibraphone, vocals
- Martin Wenk – trumpet, guitar, keyboards, accordion, glockenspiel, vibraphone (occasionally harmonica & French horn)
- Volker Zander – standup bass, electric bass

== Charts ==
Chart	Peak position
UK Albums (OCC)	55
US Billboard 200	98
US Independent Albums (Billboard)	9
US Tastemakers (Billboard)	7
