= Une Saison Volée =

Studio album by Françoiz Breut
- Released: 2005
- Recorded: 2005
- Genre: Chanson, Indie pop
- Length: 48:41
- Label: Labels, Bella Union

Françoiz Breut chronology
| Vingt à Trente Mille Jours (2000) | Une Saison Volée (2005) |

Une Saison Volée (French for "A Stolen Season") is the third album by French singer Françoiz Breut, released in 2005.

== Track listing ==
1. Intro (unknown) – 1:08
2. La certitude (Jérôme Minière) – 3:23
3. Over all (David-Ivar Herman Düne) – 4:46
4. Le ravin (Deziel) – 2:53
5. La vie devant soi (Federico Pellegrini) – 3:10
6. Tambours (unknown) – 0:15
7. Ultimo (Fabio Viscogliosi) – 2:43
8. Km 83 (Dominique Ané / Dominique Ané, Françoiz Breut) – 5:21
9. Sur le balcon (unknown) – 1:05
10. Une ville allongée sur le dos (Jérôme Minière) – 4:29
11. La boîte de nuit (Philippe Poirier) – 3:41
12. Please be angry (André Herman Düne) – 4:06
13. Ciudad del mar (Jaime Cristobal Urbican) – 4:24
14. Le premier bonheur du jour (Frank Gérald / Juan Zorro) – 3:30
15. Contourne-moi (Dominique Ané) – 4:31
