= Aerocalexico =

Studio album by Calexico
- Released: 2001
- Recorded: at the homes of Burns & Convertino and at Wavelab Studios by Craig Schumacher and Nick Luca
- Genre: Indie rock, Americana, Tex-Mex, alt.country, folk rock, post-rock
- Length: 56:26
- Label: Our Soil, Our Strength
- Producer: Joey Burns, John Convertino

Calexico chronology
Travelall (2000)	Aerocalexico (2001)	Scraping (2002)

Aerocalexico is a 2001 Calexico album that was only available on their 2001 tour or on their website.

== Track listing ==
1. "All the Pretty Horses"
2. "Blacktop"
3. "'64 Ford Fairlane"
4. "Transistorites"
5. "Clothes of Sand" (by Nick Drake)
6. "Train of Thought"
7. "Redwood"
8. "Gift X-Change"
9. "TV Room"
10. "Inch by Inch"
11. "Reverse Ranch"
12. "Crooked Road and the Briar"
13. "Impromptu for Piano and Contrabass"
14. "6 White Horses"
15. "Sequoia"
16. "Crawlspace"
17. "Humano (instrumental)"
18. "At the Table He Sat Alone with a Glass and Bottle of Wine"
19. "AZ Room"
20. "Bees and the Flies"
21. "Crystal Frontier (original version)"
22. "Hush A-Bye"
23. "Singing Wind Ranch"
