= Françoiz Breut =

French singer and illustrator (born 1969)

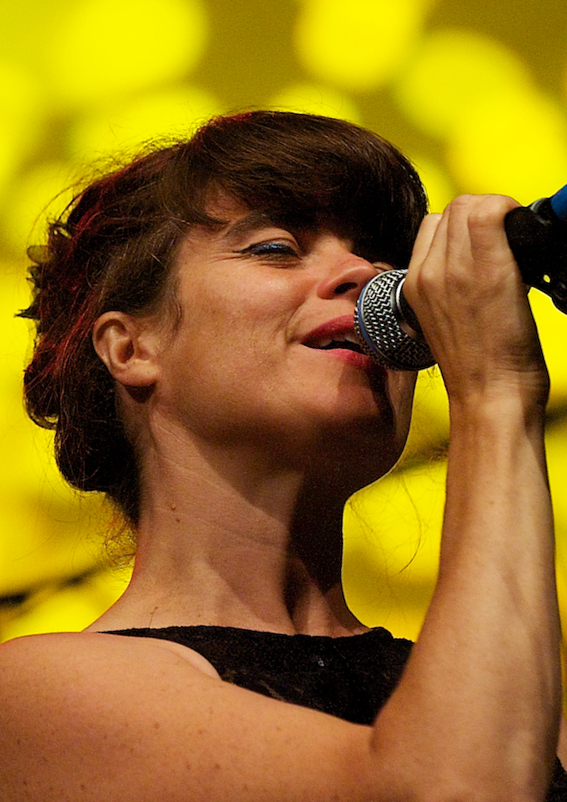
Françoiz Breut (2010)

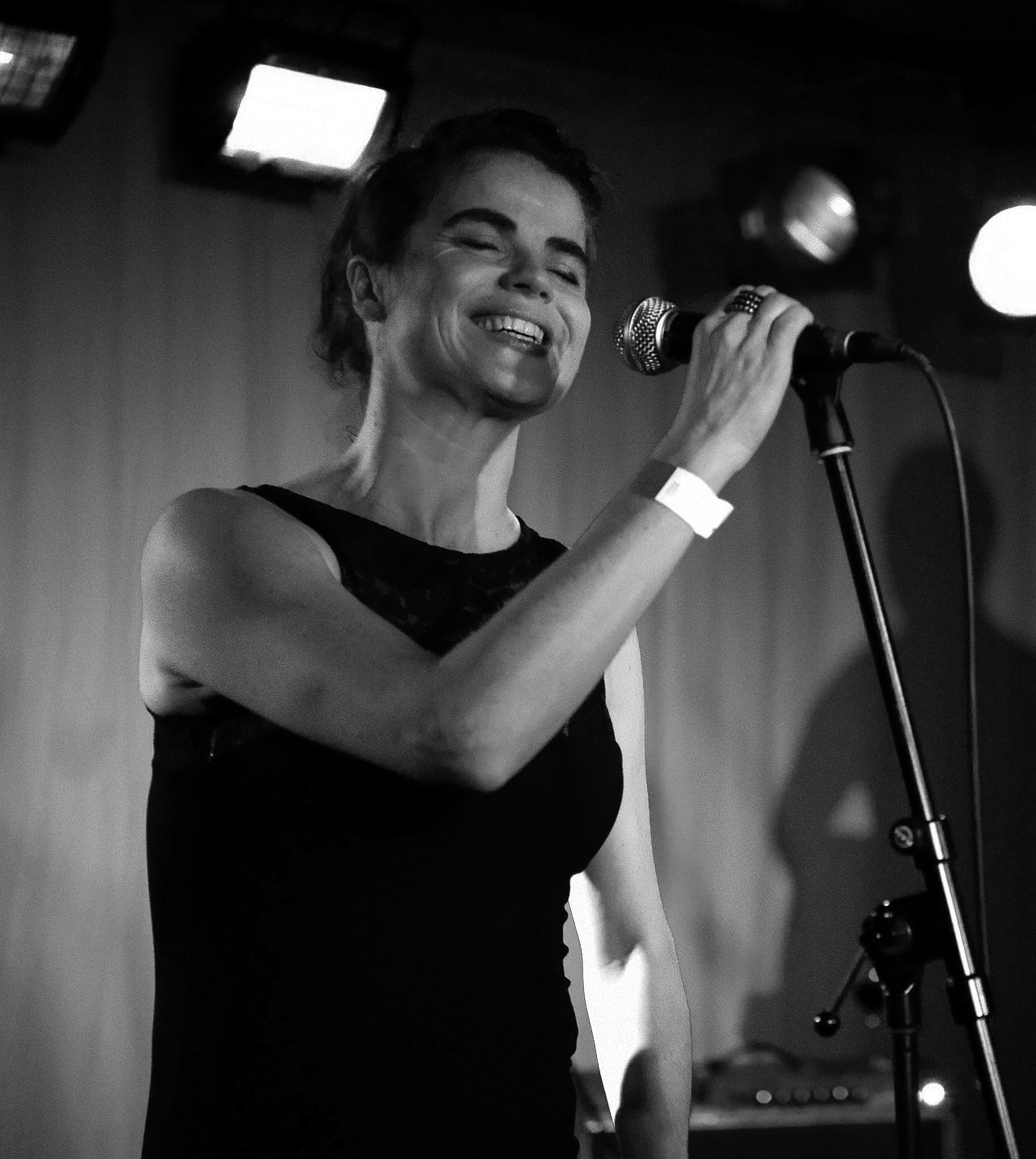
Françoiz Breut, in concert

Françoiz Breut (born 10 December 1969, in Cherbourg) is the stage name of Françoise Breut, a French illustrator and chanteuse of moody and melancholic pop. Breut got involved with music when her then-fiancé, French pop star Dominique A, asked her to contribute vocals on three songs of his 1993 album, Si Je Connais Harry. He then wrote and arranged most of the songs for her eponymous debut album. She has also collaborated with Yann Tiersen, Louise Attaque, and Calexico. She lives in Brussels, Belgium.

== Discography ==
- 1997 Françoiz Breut (Lithium, Bella Union)
- 2000 Vingt à Trente Mille Jours
- 2005 Une Saison Volée
- 2008 À L'Aveuglette
- 2010 Inédits + Live (Tour-CDR)
- 2012 La chirurgie des sentiments
- 2015 Françoiz Breut & Friends
- 2016 Zoo
- 2021 Flux flou de la foule
- 2024 VIF !

== Bibliography ==
- 1999 Illustrations for "La mer a disparu" with Michel Piquemal (Nathan, coll. Demi-lune) ISBN 2-09-275043-7
- 2002 Illustrations for "Je suis un garçon" with Arnaud Cathrine (L'école de loisirs coll. Neuf) ISBN 2-211-06496-5
- 2006 Illustrations for "Le Bobobook" with Stéphane Malandrin (La Joie de Lire) ISBN 2-88258-346-X
