= Hot Rail =

Studio album by Calexico
- Released: May 9, 2000
- Studios: WaveLab Studio, Tucson, AZ
- Genres: Americana, indie rock, Tex-Mex, post-rock
- Length: 53:17
- Label: Quarterstick Records
- Producers: Joey Burns, John Convertino

Calexico chronology
The Black Light (1998)	Hot Rail (2000)	Feast of Wire (2003)

Singles from Hot Rail
- 1. "Service & Repair" Released: 2000; 2. "Crystal Frontier" Released: 2000; 3. "Ballad of Cable Hogue" Released: 2000

Professional ratings
Review scores
Source	Rating
AllMusic	3/5 stars
Christgau's Consumer Guide	(neither)
The Encyclopedia of Popular Music	3/5 stars
Entertainment Weekly	A−
The Guardian	4/5 stars
Pitchfork	7.9/10
PopMatters	7/10
Rolling Stone	3/5 stars

Hot Rail is the third studio album by the rock band Calexico. It was released in 2000 through Quarterstick Records. A limited deluxe edition was released on November 15, 2010.

== Track listing ==
No.	Title	Writer(s)	Length
1.	"El Picador"	Burns, Convertino	3:14
2.	"Ballad of Cable Hogue"	Burns	3:29
3.	"Ritual Road Map"	Burns, Convertino	1:15
4.	"Fade"	Burns, Convertino	7:44
5.	"Untitled III"	Convertino	4:07
6.	"Sonic Wind"	Burns, Convertino	4:13
7.	"Muleta"	Burns	3:33
8.	"Mid-Town"	Burns	3:33
9.	"Service and Repair"	Burns	4:03
10.	"Untitled II"	Convertino	2:37
11.	"Drenched"	Burns	4:50
12.	"16 Track Scratch"	Burns, Convertino	1:29
13.	"Tres Avisos"	Burns	5:11
14.	"Hot Rail"	Burns, Convertino	3:58

The EU version of the album contains the additional track "Crystal Frontier" (Burns) between "Fade" and "Untitled III".

== Personnel ==
=== Calexico ===
- Joey Burns – bass, guitar, cello, voice, loops, accordion, organ
- John Convertino – drums, vibes, marimba, organ, percussion, accordion

=== Additional musicians ===
- Marianne Dissard – voice (2)
- Tim Gallagher – pedal steel (9)
- Nick Luca – guitar (1, 7, 11, 13)
- Rob Mazurek – cornet (4)
- Ruben Moreno – trumpet (1, 2, 7, 13)
- Craig Schumacher – harmonica (11), MCI 16 track (12), field recording (14)
- Madeleine Sosin – violin (1, 2, 7, 9, 11, 13)
- Martin Wenk – trumpet (1, 2, 7, 13)

== Charts ==
Chart	Peak position
UK Albums (OCC)	57
