= Spoke (album) =

Studio album by Spoke (Calexico)
- Released: 1996 (Germany); August 12, 1997 (USA)
- Recorded: November–December 1995
- Genre: Indie rock
- Length: 44:45
- Label: Hausmusik, Quarterstick

Spoke (Calexico) chronology
Spoke (1996)	The Black Light (1998)

Spoke is the debut studio album by the American band Calexico. It was initially released in Germany (Hausmusik label) under the group name Spoke.

== Critical reception ==
Professional ratings
Review scores
Source	Rating
AllMusic	3/5 stars

The Patriot Ledger wrote that "Calexico sticks with basic guitar and drums, with the occasional fiddle or string bass and here and there a Mexican-style accordion... It makes for a subtly entrancing sound, with the open spaces in the music often meaning as much as the stark arrangements themselves." The San Francisco Examiner noted the "intoxicating, sometimes moody sound."

== Track listing ==
1. "Low Expectations" (Burns, Convertino) – 2:37
2. "Mind the Gap" (Burns) – 0:52
3. "Mazurra" (Convertino) – 1:46
4. "Sanchez" (Burns, Convertino) – 3:18
5. "Haul" (Burns, Convertino) – 1:21
6. "Slag" (Burns, Convertino) – 2:29
7. "Paper Route" (Bundy, Burns, Convertino) – 2:01
8. "Glimpse" (Burns, Convertino) – 2:40
9. "Navy Cut" (Burns, Convertino) – 0:29
10. "Spokes" (Burns) – 3:38
11. "Scout" (Burns, Convertino) – 2:09
12. "Point Vicente" (Burns, Coffman, Convertino) – 3:56
13. "Wash" (Burns) – 2:35
14. "Ice Cream Jeep" (Burns) – 0:31
15. "Windjammer" (Burns, Convertino) – 2:38
16. "Mazurka" (Convertino) – 1:20
17. "Removed" (Burns, Coffman) – 3:52
18. "Hitch" (Burns, Convertino) – 2:53
19. "Stinging Nettle" (Burns, Coffman) – 3:41

== Personnel ==
- John Convertino—drums, vibes, marimba, guitar, accordion
- Joey Burns—bass, cello, guitar, mandolin, vocals, accordion
- Tasha Bundy—drums
- Bridget Keating—violin
- David Coffman—guitar
