= Lithium (label) =

French indie rock label

Lithium was a French indie rock label, founded by Vincent Chauvier in the early 1990s. It ceased to exist in 2004.

== Some artists ==
- Dominique A
- Françoiz Breut
- Diabologum
- Mendelson
