= Craig Schumacher =

- Origin: Tucson, Arizona, United States
- Genres: Alternative country Alternative rock
- Years active: 1993–present

Craig Schumacher is an American producer and audio engineer based in Tucson, Arizona. He is known for recording and mixing albums by Calexico, Devotchka, Neko Case, Giant Sand, The Jayhawks, Friends of Dean Martinez, and Amos Lee. His studio is Wavelab Studios, with an "open room" philosophy of recording with no separated control room.
