= Sergio Mendoza Y La Orkesta =

Latin music band

Orkesta Mendoza
- Origin: Tucson, Arizona
- Genres: Ranchera, cumbia, indie rock, mambo
- Years active: 2009–present
- Labels: Cosmica Records (US); LePop (Europe), Glitterbeat (Europe)
- Spinoff of: Pérez Prado
- Members: Sergio Mendoza; James Peters; Quetzal Guerrero; Raul Marquez
- Website: http://orkestamendoza.com/

Orkesta Mendoza is a Latin music band from Tucson, Arizona. It was founded by singer and guitarist Sergio Mendoza in 2009. Through the use of Latin percussion, accordion, brass, and steel guitars, the band's style, dubbed "indie mambo", is a combination of ranchera, cumbia, psychedelic and indie rock.

== Biography ==
Sergio Mendoza formed Sergio Mendoza y La Orkesta in 2009 out of a one-off tribute project to the Cuban mambo king Pérez Prado, which proved too much fun to stop. Later renamed the band's name to Orkesta Mendoza.

In October, 2014, Orkesta Mendoza performed at WOMEX 14 Official Showcase Selection of World Music Expo 2014.

In May, 2015, Orkesta Mendoza performed at Pachanga Latino Music Festival.

== Discography ==
- Mambo Mexicano (2012)
- La Rienda (2014)
- ¡Vamos A Guarachar! (2016)
- La Caminadora (2018)
- Curandero (2020)

== Members ==
- Sergio Mendoza – vocals, piano, guitar
- James Anthony Peters – drums, percussion, sequencing
- Quetzal Guerrero - violin, vocals
- Raul Marquez - trumpet, guitar, vocals

Guest touring Members

- Brian Lopez - guitar, vocals

Former members

- Marco Rosano – saxophone, clarinet, accordion, keyboard Trombone
- Sean Rogers – double bass
- Salvador Duran - vocals
- Joe Novelli - lap steel, guitar
