= Calexico (band) =

American rock band

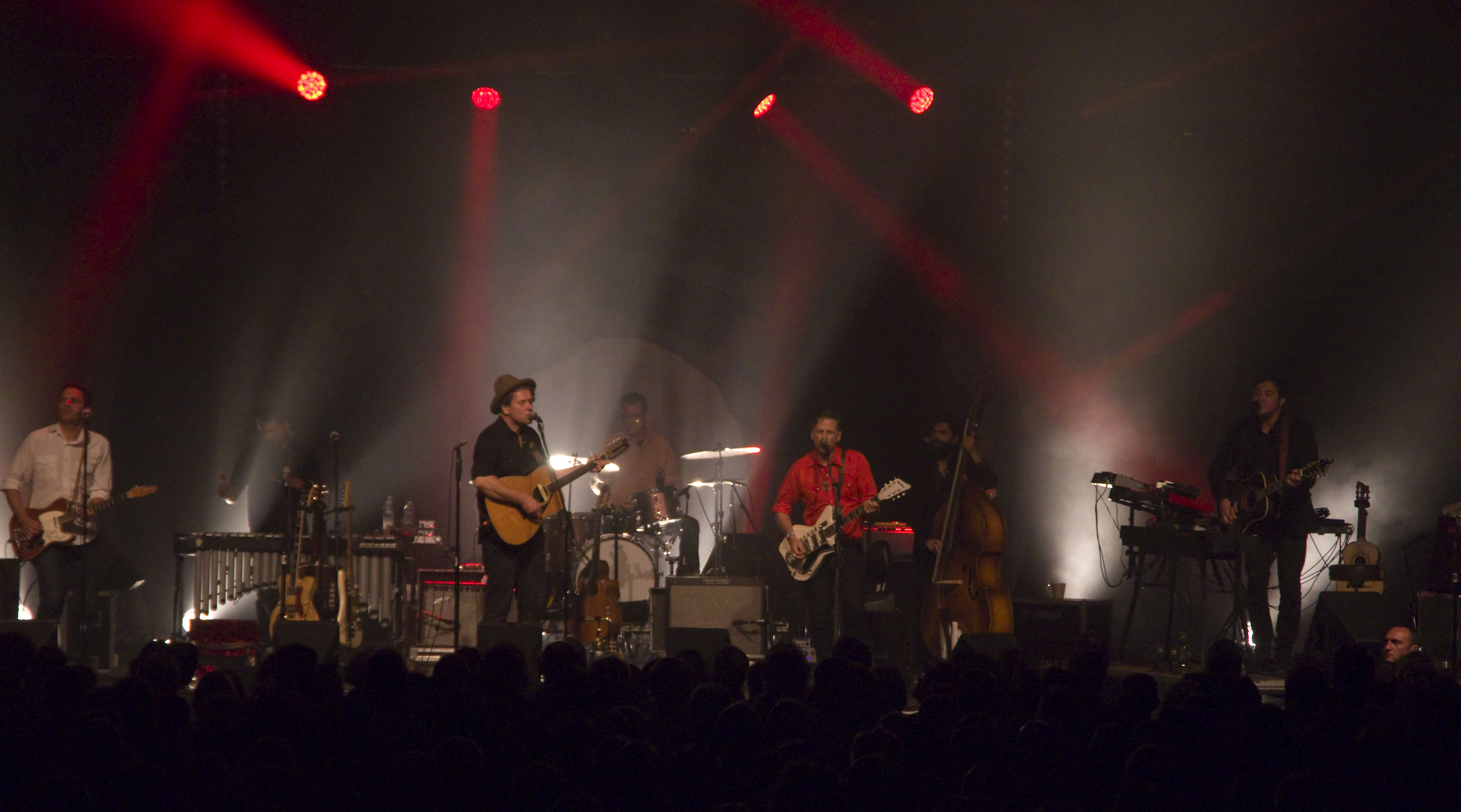
- Calexico performing in 2016

Background information
- Origin: Tucson, Arizona, U.S.
- Genres: Americana; indie rock; alternative country; indie folk; Tejano; post-rock; Latin rock
- Years active: 1996–present
- Labels: City Slang; Quarterstick; Our Soil, Our Strength
- Members: Joey Burns; John Convertino; Scott Colberg; Jacob Valenzuela; Martin Wenk; Sergio Mendoza; Jairo Zavala; Brian Lopez
- Website: casadecalexico.com

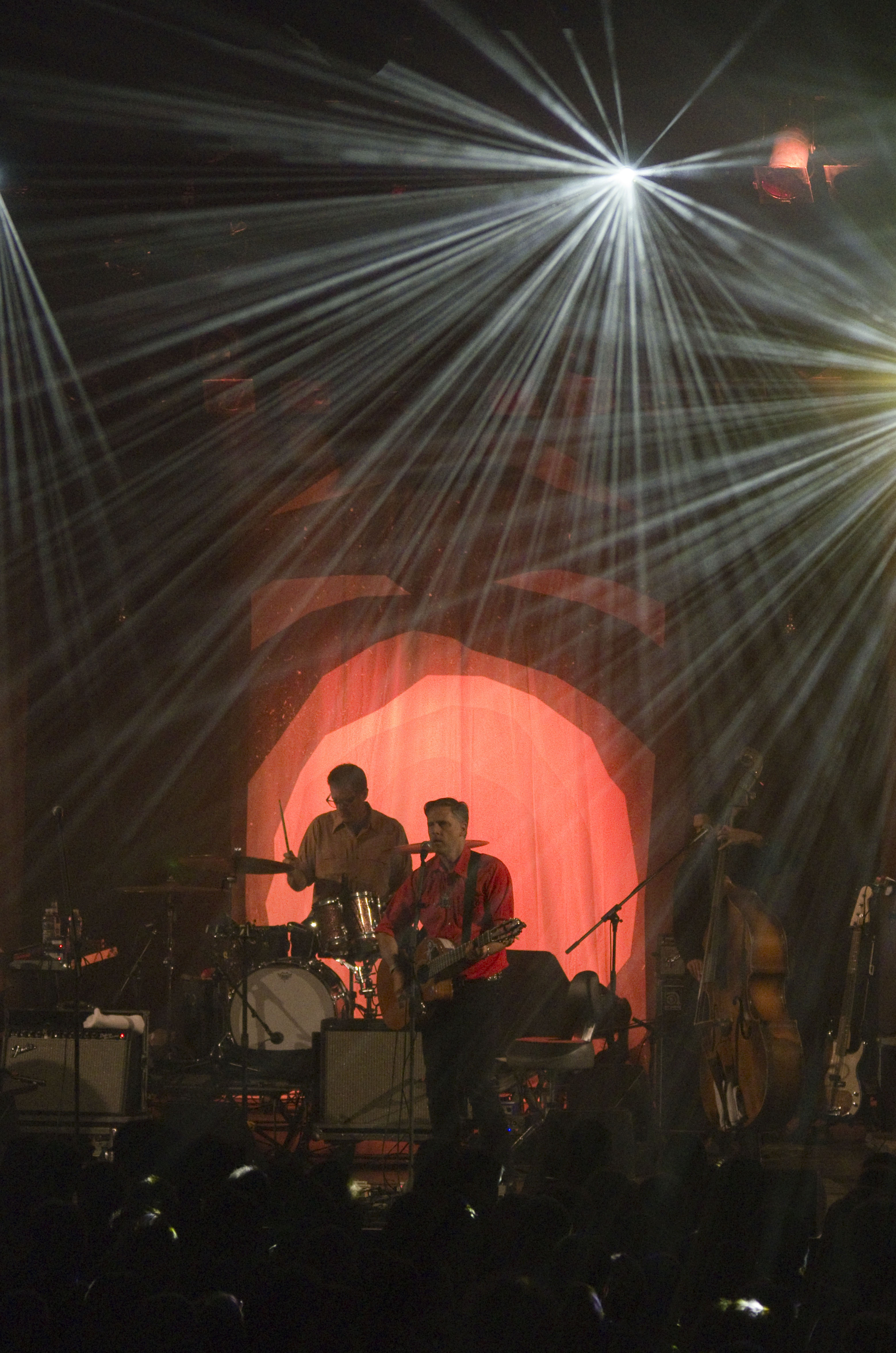
Zelt-Musik-Festival 2016

Calexico is an American indie rock band based in Tucson, Arizona. Founded in 1996, the band's two main members, Joey Burns and John Convertino, first played together in Los Angeles as part of the group Giant Sand. They have recorded a number of albums on Quarterstick Records and City Slang, and their 2005 EP, In the Reins, recorded with Iron & Wine, reached the Billboard 200 albums chart. Their musical style is influenced by traditional Latin sounds of mariachi, conjunto, cumbia, and tejano mixed with country, jazz, and post-rock.

The band is named for the border town of Calexico, California, and has been described by some as "desert noir".

== History ==
=== Formation ===
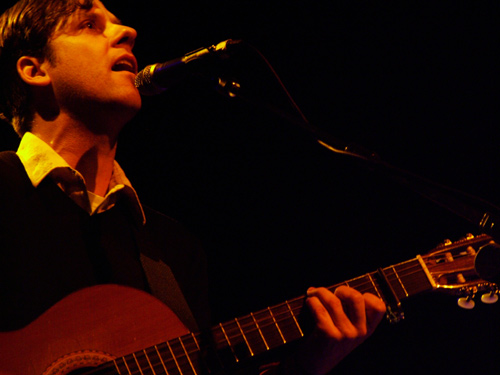
Joey Burns

Calexico had its origins in 1990 when Joey Burns, who was studying music at the University of California, Irvine, met up with John Convertino, who was playing drums with Howe Gelb in Giant Sand. Burns also joined Giant Sand, after first playing upright bass on a European tour.

Around this time, Burns and Convertino also played in the Friends of Dean Martinez along with Bill Elm. This group signed a record deal with Sub Pop. However, the pair split up with Bill Elm, the co-founder of The Friends of Dean Martinez in 1996. The band subsequently became a kind of indie rhythm section for hire, working with the likes of Victoria Williams, Bill Janovitz, Barbara Manning and Richard Buckner before forming Calexico.

Calexico first recorded Spoke in 1995 for German independent label Hausmusik with a limited edition of 2,000 copies. At that point the band was still called Spoke and the album was technically self-titled. After the band signed with Quarterstick Records (a subsidiary of Touch and Go Records) and changed their name to Calexico, Spoke was reissued by that label in 1997. Burns and Convertino also collaborated with Gelb and Lisa Germano on the album Slush released under the name OP8 that same year.

=== Early years (1998–2005) ===
Their second album, The Black Light, was released in 1998. This was a concept album about the desert of Arizona and northern Mexico and received excellent reviews, with the critic from the Wall Street Journal rating it as one of the best records of the year.

The band built their profile by touring as support acts for bands such as Pavement, the Dirty Three and Lambchop. Calexico has regularly played festivals such as the Bonnaroo Music Festival, the Hurricane Festival and All Tomorrow's Parties. The Road Map album was a limited recording released in 1999 for sale only at Calexico's live shows.

Calexico released its third album Hot Rail in May 2000 featuring the addition of horns and violin to their sound. The duo was busy in 2000 as they also appeared on a Giant Sand record called Chore of Enchantment as well as a tour only record Travelall.

At the end of 2000, Burns and Convertino joined with two French friends Naïm Amor and Thomas Belhôm to record "Tête A Tête" (Wabana Records, 2001) released under moniker ABBC (Amor/Belhom/Burns/Convertino). Calexico released two collections of rarities during 2001. Even My Sure Things Fall Through collected outtakes from previous albums, B-sides, remixes and material previously unreleased in the US. The album also featured Mariachi Luz de Luna who frequently played live with the duo. The Aerocalexico album was sold exclusively at their gigs in 2001. Their songs "Ballad Of Cable Hogue" and "Service And Repair" were featured in the 2001 German comedy movie Lammbock.

Calexico released Feast of Wire in 2003. The album is considered their breakthrough album; further, it was praised by Mojo.

=== Garden Ruin to Edge of the Sun (2006 to 2017) ===
Released in 2006, Garden Ruin is Calexico's fifth studio album and was produced by JD Foster. The sound strays slightly from earlier works, focusing less on the horn section and placing more emphasis on guitar and vocal tracks, giving the whole album a more contemporary Indie sound.

Their sixth studio LP is called Carried to Dust, featuring Sam Beam of Iron & Wine, Douglas McCombs of Tortoise and Pieta Brown. It was released in the US via Touch & Go Records on September 9, 2008. The album was positively reviewed. On October 16, 2008, a three-song live acoustic video performance premiered on LiveDaily Sessions, featuring Joey Burns performing the songs "Two Silver Trees", "Writer's Minor Holiday" and "Man Made Lake." In 2009, the song "Banderilla" was featured in an episode of AMC's Breaking Bad.

In 2010, Calexico released the soundtrack of the documentary Circo. The band also spent part of 2010 touring with Arcade Fire along the US west coast. In May 2011, their song "Slowness" was dedicated by Gabby Giffords to her husband astronaut Mark Kelly as the wake up song aboard the Space Shuttle Endeavour on its final flight. Algiers was released 11 September 2012 on Anti-Records and City Slang (Europe). Algiers is titled after the neighborhood of New Orleans where it was recorded, Algiers, New Orleans. This was Calexico's seventh studio album.

In April 2013, Calexico released the album Edge of the Sun. The album features guest appearances by Neko Case, Sam Beam (Iron & Wine), Ben Bridwell (Band of Horses), Gaby Moreno, Carla Morrison and members of the Greek instrumental group Takim. Burns commented how happy he was to work with Sergio Mendoza on writing the songs for the album. Mendoza also co-produced the album along with Burns and Convertino. This album was also released on Anti-Records. In 2016, the band performed on the main stage at the Edmonton Folk Music Festival.

=== The Thread That Keeps Us (2018 to present) ===
In 2018, Calexico released The Thread That Keeps Us. The album was recorded in Northern California in a home-turned-studio called Panoramic House. The band called this space “The Phantom Ship”. The album was co-produced by their longtime engineer Craig Schumacher. Calexico and Schumacher recruited musicians from all across the globe to find an earthy yet expansive sound. “There's a little more chaos and noise in the mix than what we've done in the past,” Burns points out. The rugged coastline of northern California impacted the making of The Thread That Keeps Us. This sound is heard throughout the album. The album was released by Anti-Records and City Slang on January 26, 2018.

The Thread That Keeps Us was No. 2 on the Alternative Albums retail chart and No. 5 on the Americana / Folk Chart in the USA in its first week of sales (Billboard). The Thread That Keeps Us also entered the charts in Europe at no. 7 in Germany, No. 13 in Belgium, No. 21 in Netherlands, No. 47 in France, No. 58 in the United Kingdom, and No. 60 in Italy.

On March 21, 2019, Calexico and Iron & Wine announced Years to Burn, their first full-length collaboration album. It was released on June 14, 2019 via Sub Pop.

Then, on December 4, 2020, they released their eleventh album Seasonal Shift via Anti- and City Slang.

In February 2022, Calexico announced that their thirteenth studio album, El Mirador, would be released on April 8, 2022.

The band reissued and toured Feast of Wire in 2023; the album's twentieth anniversary.

== Members ==
=== Current members ===
- Joey Burns (1996–present) – vocals, guitars, bass, cello, piano, keyboards, accordion, percussion, vibraphone
- John Convertino (1996–present) – drums
- Jacob Valenzuela – trumpet, vocals, keyboards, vibraphone
- Martin Wenk – trumpet, guitar, keyboards, accordion, glockenspiel, vibraphone, theremin, vocals (occasionally harmonica & French horn)
- Scott Colberg – standup bass, electric bass
- Sergio Mendoza (2007–present) – keyboards, accordion, percussion

=== Touring members ===
- Jairo Zavala (2013) – bouzouki, baritone guitar, vocals
- Ryan Alfred (2013) – bass, vocals
- Brian Lopez (2018, 2022–24) – guitar, vocals

== Discography ==
=== Albums ===
- Spoke (1996)
- The Black Light (1998)
- Hot Rail (2000)
- Feast of Wire (2003, reissued 2023)
- Garden Ruin (2006)
- Carried to Dust (2008)
- Algiers (2012)
- Edge of the Sun (2015)
- The Thread That Keeps Us (2018)
- Years to Burn (with Iron & Wine) (2019)
- Seasonal Shift (2020)
- El Mirador (2022)

=== EPs ===
- Descamino (2000)
- Even My Sure Things Fall Through (2001)
- Convict Pool (2004)
- In the Reins with Iron & Wine (2005)
- iTunes Live Sessions (2006)

=== Soundtracks ===
- Committed (2000)
- Circo (2010)
- The Guard (2011)

=== Live ===
- Scraping (2002)
- World Drifts In (2004)
- Ancienne Belgique (2008)
- Spiritoso (2013)
- Ancienne Belgique Vol. 2 (2013)

== Critical acclaim ==
Their debut album Spoke received three stars from AllMusic, which called the album "a Santa Fe rummage sale of sounds." Their second album The Black Light, released in 1998, gained the band notoriety and attention. AllMusic praised this sophomore effort and gave the album 4.5 stars. The album was praised for being "deeper and richer than their debut."

Hot Rail was released in 2000 and continued off the success of previous albums. Pitchfork gave the album a 7.9. The band then took a brief hiatus and released their next studio album in 2003, Feast of Wire. The album received an 8.9 from Pitchfork, which described it as "the album we always knew they had in them but feared they would never make."

Feast of Wire was well received by Mojo, describing the 2003 album as, “Seductive, stirring songs about crushed hope and the corruption of beauty and some of their most ambitious arrangements make this their most fully-realised and accomplished album”.

Again after another hiatus, Calexico returned in 2006 with Garden Ruin. Amazon gave their album a 90/100 and described it as "what Sigur Ros might sound like if they came from Arizona, and it's truly excellent." In 2008, came Carried to Dust. By now Calexico was already established as a band who meticulously created beautiful albums. This success continued with Carried to Dust receiving 4.5 stars from AllMusic. Describing the album as "their most balanced, channeling their experience and potential into a subtly dramatic, chiaroscuro tour de force."

2012 was a busy year for Calexico, giving birth to a new album titled Algiers. The A.V. Club gave the album an A−. Another studio album came in 2015; titled Edge of the Sun. This album also received high ranks from reviewers. Rough Trade called it the twenty-first best album of 2015. Their next studio album came in 2018, The Thread That Keeps Us. Exclaim! rated the album a 4 out of 10.
