= Such Great Heights EP =

Such Great Heights

EP by Iron & Wine
- Released: 2006
- Genre: Folk
- Length: 13:49
- Label: Sub Pop
- Producer: Brian Deck

Iron & Wine chronology
In the Reins (with Calexico) (2005)	Such Great Heights (2006)	Boy with a Coin (EP) (2007)

Such Great Heights is an EP by the Florida singer-songwriter Iron & Wine. It was released in 2006 on the Sub Pop record label.

The title track is a cover of a popular song by The Postal Service. Iron & Wine's version originally appeared on The Postal Service's Such Great Heights single, released in 2003, and was used in the 2004 film Garden State and its soundtrack. (The Postal Service also had an EP entitled Such Great Heights which contained both bands' versions of the song; it also included a cover of the song "We Will Become Silhouettes" performed by The Shins and an original song entitled "There's Never Enough Time".)

== Track listing ==
1. "Such Great Heights" (The Postal Service cover)
2. "Trapeze Swinger" (Live recording from Radio Vienna)
3. "Naked As We Came" (Live recording from Radio Vienna)
