= Norfolk 6/20/05 =

2009 live album by Iron & Wine

Live album by Iron & Wine
- Released: April 18, 2009
- Recorded: June 20, 2005
- Venues: The NorVa, Norfolk, Virginia
- Label: Sub Pop

Iron & Wine chronology
The Shepherd's Dog (2007)	Norfolk 6/20/05 (2009)	Around the Well (2009)

Norfolk is a live album by Iron & Wine released on April 18, 2009, Record Store Day. However it was recorded on June 20, 2005. It received an extremely limited release and is now only available on Iron & Wine's official website.

== Description ==
The session was recorded at The Norva in Norfolk, Virginia as a date on Iron & Wine's 2005 Woman King Tour. It features a full band as well as Samuel Beam's sister, Sarah Beam, providing backing vocals. The album features 5 of the 6 songs on the Woman King EP as well as a few songs from the debut album The Creek Drank the Cradle. Many of the songs are also from his second album, 2004's Our Endless Numbered Days. The then-unreleased b-side "Communion Cups and Someone's Coat" also appears as well as a live rendition of the fan favorite "The Trapeze Swinger". The album was released in support of genuine, independently owned record stores.

== Track listing ==
No.	Title	Length
1.	"Sunset Soon Forgotten"	3:09
2.	"Jezebel"	4:13
3.	"Woman King"	3:55
4.	"Free Until They Cut Me Down"	4:40
5.	"Evening on the Ground (Lilith's Song)"	2:44
6.	"Love and Some Verses"	3:37
7.	"Bird Stealing Bread"	3:51
8.	"The Night Descending"	2:21
9.	"Naked as We Came"	2:55
10.	"Communion Cups & Someone's Coat"	2:16
11.	"Fever Dream"	3:58
12.	"On Your Wings"	4:05
13.	"Freedom Hangs Like Heaven"	3:41
14.	"Upward Over the Mountain"	4:10
15.	"Teeth in the Grass"	2:19
16.	"Southern Anthem"	5:30
17.	"My Lady's House"	2:53
18.	"The Trapeze Swinger"	7:29
Total length:		67:38
