= All in Good Time =

All in Good Time may refer to:

== Music ==
- All in Good Time (Rob McConnell album), 1982
- All in Good Time (Patrick Street album), 1993
- All in Good Time (Marcus Hummon album), 1995
- All in Good Time, a 2005 album by Pure Prairie League
- All in Good Time, a 2005 album by Johnny Jenkins
- All in Good Time (Barenaked Ladies album), 2010
- All in Good Time, a 1993 orchestral composition by Barbara Kolb
- "All in Good Time", a song by Ron Sexsmith from the 2006 album Time Being
- "All in Good Time", a song by Leon Jackson from the 2008 album Right Now
- "All in Good Time", the ending theme to Shakugan no Shana S by Mami Kawada, released on the 2010 album Linkage
- "All In Good Time", song recorded by Iron & Wine with Fiona Apple, on the 2024 album Light Verse

== Other media ==
- All in Good Time (play), a 1963 play by Bill Naughton
- All in Good Time: Reflections of a Watchmaker, a 2000 memoir by George Daniels
- All in Good Time, a 2004 memoir by Jonathan Schwartz
- All in Good Time (film), a 2012 film by British film and television director Nigel Cole
- "All in Good Time" (Bodies), a 2023 television episode
