= Archive Series Volume No. 1 =

Compilation album by Iron & Wine
- Released: February 24, 2015
- Genre: Folk
- Length: 61:27
- Label: Black Cricket Recording Co.
- Producer: Sam Beam

Iron & Wine chronology
Ghost on Ghost (2013)	Archive Series Volume No. 1 (2015)	Sing into My Mouth (2015)

Singles from Archive Series Volume No. 1
- 1. "Everyone's Summer of '95" Released: January 8, 2015

Archive Series Volume No. 1 is a rarities collection by Iron & Wine, released February 24, 2015 on Beam's new record label Black Cricket Recording Co. The collection consists of unreleased home recordings and demos from the same time period as the 2002 album The Creek Drank the Cradle and the 2003 EP The Sea & The Rhythm. "Everyone's Summer of '95" was the first track to be officially released from the album.

== Reception ==
Professional ratings
Aggregate scores
Source	Rating
Metacritic	76/100
Review scores
Source	Rating
AllMusic	3.5/5 stars
American Songwriter	3.5/5 stars
Exclaim!	8/10
Pitchfork	(7.2/10)
PopMatters	7/10

At Metacritic, which assigns a normalized rating out of 100 to reviews from mainstream critics, Archive Series Volume No. 1 received an average score of 76, based on 6 reviews, which indicates "generally favorable reviews".

AllMusic reviewer Fred Thomas described the album as "a perfect companion piece to The Creek Drank the Cradle and a deeper look into what must have been an incredibly inspired and productive time for the young songwriter". Alex Hudson wrote in Exclaim that the tracks were "quality material" but that the collection "doesn't have quite enough stylistic or emotional variety to hold up as a proper album". Similarly, Pitchfork reviewer Stephen M. Deusner wrote that "the songs on here are surprisingly strong, such that any of them could have appeared on a proper album at any point in Beam’s decade-plus career. But the collection never sounds like the sum of its parts."

== Track listing ==
No.	Title	Length
1.	"Slow Black River"	2:27
2.	"The Wind Is Low"	3:32
3.	"Eden"	2:43
4.	"Two Hungry Blackbirds"	5:08
5.	"Freckled Girl"	2:44
6.	"Judgement"	5:40
7.	"Sing Song Bird"	1:47
8.	"Beyond the Fence"	6:39
9.	"Quarters in a Pocket"	3:52
10.	"Loretta"	2:54
11.	"Everyone's Summer of '95"	3:10
12.	"Minor Piano Keys"	5:17
13.	"Your Sly Smile"	3:21
14.	"Halfway to Richmond"	5:19
15.	"Wade Across the Water"	2:04
16.	"Postcard"	4:50
Total length:		61:27

== Personnel ==
- Sam Beam - vocals, guitar, banjo
