= Weed Garden =

EP by Iron & Wine
- Released: August 31, 2018
- Length: 20:22
- Label: Sub Pop

Iron & Wine chronology
Beast Epic (2017)	Weed Garden (2018)	Years to Burn (2019)

Professional ratings
Aggregate scores
Source	Rating
Metacritic	72/100
Review scores
Source	Rating
AllMusic	3.5/5 stars
Drowned in Sound	8/10
Exclaim!	6/10

Weed Garden is an EP by American musician Iron & Wine. It was released on August 30, 2018 through Sub Pop.

== Track listing ==
No.	Title	Length
1.	"What Hurts Worse"	3:00
2.	"Waves of Galveston"	3:36
3.	"Last of Your Rock 'N' Roll Heroes"	3:20
4.	"Milkweed"	3:20
5.	"Autumn Town Leaves"	3:15
6.	"Talking to Fog"	3:51

== Charts ==
Chart (2018)	Peak position
US Folk Albums (Billboard)	19
US Independent Albums (Billboard)	13

== In other media ==
- "Autumn Town Leaves" was used in the NBC series Manifest.
