= Flightless Bird, American Mouth =

Single by Iron & Wine

from the album The Shepherd's Dog
- Released: December 11, 2008
- Genre: Folk rock; indie rock
- Length: 4:03
- Label: Sub Pop
- Songwriter: Sam Beam
- Producers: Sam Beam; Brian Deck

Iron & Wine singles chronology
"Lovesong of the Buzzard" (2008)	"Flightless Bird, American Mouth" (2008)	"Love Vigilantes" (2009)

"Flightless Bird, American Mouth" is a song recorded by the American singer-songwriter Iron & Wine. The song was released on December 11, 2008 through Sub Pop as the third single from the project's third studio album The Shepherd's Dog.

== Background ==
By 2007, Sam Beam had been recording music as Iron & Wine for upwards of a decade. He had married and started a growing family, and saw it time for him to leave Florida, where he had lived since college, to move to Texas. There, he built a custom home studio, for him to record when he pleased; he would treat his compositions like paintings, to return to them when he felt ready, rather than having to book studio time or feel forced to create. At that same time, Beam likened himself to coming to terms with his own life and history, the "difference[s] between myth and reality," and how profound the 9/11 attacks were to him.

At his Texas studio, Beam invited Brian Deck, with whom he had recorded his breakthrough LP, Our Endless Numbered Days (2004), to assist in developing his next effort. Deck would make a loop for Beam to record guitar parts to, which led to the development of "Flightless Bird, American Mouth". Beam likened his studio space to a "mad factory"; he jokes in a podcast appearance that the song's drum sound is unusual in that the room was round in nature, and not particularly suited to recording drums. His original demo for the song is revealed in a 2022 appearance on the Song Exploder podcast.

Beam wrote the song reminiscing about his childhood, imagining himself "running around under streetlights" in his neighborhood. At that time, he was interested in Beat poetry, particularly the work of Allen Ginsberg, taken with the way they depicted America. The forms with which the poets juxtapose "incongruous images" affected the song's content. Beam summarized the song's theme as "a statement: this is what it was like when I was young, and this is what I'm frustrated about now—growing up, getting older, [and] feeling unsettled." In an abstract sense, the "flightless bird" is innocence, the "American mouth" a representation of its loss. Other lyrics in the song, particularly the "Blood of Christ mountain stream" passage, were inspired by Beam's hike up the Sangre de Cristo Mountains in New Mexico; he uses these lyrics to suggest sacredness is being treated indiscriminately (or the validity of industries like advertising).

Sonically, the song interprets this growing frustration with more complex instrumentation as it develops. It begins quiet and becomes more fully-fledged over its runtime: Beam's vocal tracks are multi-tracked so that he harmonizes with himself, while Rob Burger performs piano and accordion on the song. The acoustic guitar uses an EBow to induce forced string vibrations. The album's liner notes credit nearly a dozen instrumentalists, a reflection of Beam's desire for "new voices [and] new sounds".

== Music video ==
The orchestral "Wedding Version" of the song received a music video treatment, mainly black-and-white clips of Beam in the studio.

== Reception ==
Joe Tangari at Pitchfork praised the album's sequencing, calling "Flightless Bird" as its closing track "stunning and starkly emotional." Michael Metivier from PopMatters praised its waltzing tempo, writing, "Crystalline piano fills sweep through the album’s final moments, trading time with coos and sighs, the song simultaneously one of courtship and mourning." In 2023, Alternative music website Melophobe called the track the 46th greatest "mellow indie song" of all time.

== In popular culture ==
The song became the soundtrack to a key moment during a prom scene in the original Twilight film. An acoustic version of the song, dubbed the "Wedding Version", was also used in The Twilight Saga: Breaking Dawn – Part 1 (2011). Beam, a former film student, was happy to license the song; he was asked by Uncut how the song came to be associated with the series:

The story that I heard is that the album (The Shepherd's Dog) had just come out and Kristen Stewart was listening to it on her headphones when the filmmakers were blocking the prom scene. As the song "Flightless Bird, American Mouth" was working in her head, she suggested they use it to block the scene. So they did, intending on switching it later to something that other people might really want to hear. But you know how it is, you hear it too many times and it sticks - so that's what happened.

Iron & Wine performed the song on The Tonight Show with Jay Leno twice; first on January 6, 2009 and again on December 1, 2011 after the release of the "Wedding Version".

== Certifications ==
Region	Certification	Certified units/sales
United Kingdom (BPI)	Silver	200,000^{‡}
^{‡} Sales+streaming figures based on certification alone.

== Personnel ==
Credits adapted from the album's liner notes.

- Sam Beam – performance, songwriting
- Brian Deck – performance, production, mixing
- EJ Holowicki – performance
- Jim Becker – performance
- Joey Burns – performance
- John Katke – performance
- Matt Lux – performance
- Patrick McKinney – performance
- Paul Niehaus – performance
- Rob Burger – performance
- Sarah Beam – performance
- Colin Studybaker – engineer
- Balthazar De Lay – additional engineer
- Neil Strauch – additional engineer
- Greg Calbi – mastering
