= Woman king (disambiguation) =

A woman king or queen regnant is a female monarch.

Woman king may also refer to:

- Woman King, a 2005 EP by Iron & Wine
  - "Woman King", a 2005 song on the album of the same name
- The Woman King, a 2022 American historical film about the Agojie, the 19th-century all-female regiment of the African kingdom of Dahomey
- "The Woman King" (Battlestar Galactica), 2007 episode of the TV series
- A euphemism for the Iyalode, a powerful Yoruba chief, who claims Oba Obirin (Yoruba: "King of the Women") as a subsidiary title

== See also ==
- King Woman, an American heavy metal band
