= Hunting My Dress =

Studio album by Jesca Hoop
- Released: November 16, 2009 UK; July 27, 2010 US
- Genre: Alternative, folk, rock
- Length: 39:51
- Label: Last Laugh Records (UK) / Vanguard Records (US)

Jesca Hoop chronology
Kismet (2007)	Hunting My Dress (2009)	Snowglobe (2011)

Alternative cover
- Hunting My Dress US cover

Hunting My Dress is the second studio album by Jesca Hoop. It was released on CD in the UK in November 2009 on Last Laugh Records and on vinyl in the US in July of the following year on Vanguard Records.

== Background ==
Most of the material was written and recorded after Hoop moved from the US to UK. It was written over the course of eighteen months, being described as an 'unlikely weaving of hip-hop, Native American rhythms and birdsong'. The album was recorded at Tony Berg's Zeitgeist Studio in Los Angeles.

The album had its launch party in "a lorry trailer in my back garden", Hoop explained, and was supported by a short UK tour.

"Murder of Birds"
The song 'Murder of Birds' is a duet with Guy Garvey of the band Elbow.

In a review for the BBC, Rob Crossan wrote, "Obvious comparisons are there to be made when listening to Hoop's impressive vocal range and almost scholarly attention to lyrical detail, the quickest to spring to mind being Björk and Kate Bush.....Guy Harvey of Elbow is another huge fan, and his duet with her, Murder of Birds, is an immediate standout on this collection. A touch of Edgar Allen Poe is clear to hear in lines such as “I've got demons / when I need 'ems”"

In 2014, Hoop released the album Undress with acoustic reinterpretations of the songs.

Professional ratings
Aggregate scores
Source	Rating
Metacritic	78/100
Review scores
Source	Rating
The Guardian	4/5 stars
AllMusic	3.5/5 stars
PopMatters	3.5/5 stars
DIY (magazine)	3.5/5 stars
Shakenstir	3.4/5 stars

== Track listing ==
All tracks are written by Jesca Hoop.

No.	Title	Length
1.	"Whispering Light"	4:06
2.	"The Kingdom"	3:50
3.	"Feast of the Heart"	3:27
4.	"Angel Mom"	5:07
5.	"Four Dreams"	4:58
6.	"Murder of Birds"	4:35
7.	"Bed Across the Sea"	3:36
8.	"Tulip"	5:06
9.	"Hunting My Dress"	4:56

Bonus EP (with US release)
No.	Title	Length
1.	"Enemy"	3:27
2.	"Intelligentactile 101"	4:26
3.	"Silverscreen"	4:03
4.	"My Boo"	3:45
5.	"Wintersong"	4:18

== Personnel ==
All personnel credits adapted from Hunting My Dress' sleeve notes.

- Vocals – Jesca Hoop
- Additional vocals – Nicole Eva Emery
- Guitars – Jesca Hoop, Blake Mills
- Drums – Quinn Smith
- Synthesizer – Patrick Warren

Technical personnel

- Engineering – Shawn Everett
- Production – Jesca Hoop, Tony Berg
- Mastering – Hans Dekline

Design

- Artwork – Rick Whitmore, Alex Berg
- Photography – Shirlaine Forrest
