= Long Wave Home =

Studio album by Jesca Hoop
- Released: 1 May 2026
- Studios: Blueprint (Manchester); The Shed (London); Empire Sound (Isle of Wight); J&J (Bristol)
- Genres: Alternative rock, folk, pop
- Length: 37:27
- Label: Last Laugh
- Producer: Jesca Hoop

Jesca Hoop chronology
Order of Romance (2022)	Long Wave Home (2026)

Singles from Long Wave Home
- 1. "Designer Citizen" Released: Feb 2026; 2. "Big Storm" Released: 2026; 3. "Caravan" Released: 2026

Long Wave Home is the seventh studio album by singer-songwriter Jesca Hoop. It was released in May 2026 on Last Laugh label / Republic of Music.

== Background ==
Long Wave Home is the first record to be produced by Hoop. In an interview for NPR Music, Hoop explained, "I'd always been under the sturdy wing of a producer. And this time, I thought, if I'm going to grow and evolve, I should take off those training wheels. I should rely on my own judgment".

"Long Wave Home"
Title track of the album

The album touches on love and life with a smattering of protest and politics. Rhys James of Buzz magazine wrote, "Californian in Manchester Jesca Hoop is a wandering storyteller of distinction [...] Hoop exceeds expectations with a record that is weird, unnerving and rooted in folk storytelling".

Long Wave Home was recorded at different studios across England over a three week period. Speaking to Tobias Furlong of The Line of Best Fit, Hoop recalled, "It’s all about making sure you have the right person for the right job and I kind of made this album a bit more complicated by traveling to different studios [...] I decided to book studios on the Isle of Wight, London, Manchester, and Bristol". Furlong summarised, "Approaching the creation of Long Wave Home in this way [...] will have you falling in love with the songwriter all over again, just like it is the first time".

The album has received critical acclaim. In a review by Higher Plain Music, Simon Smith concludes, "Long Wave Home is an album that will grow over time. There are few immediate hooks or in-your-face moments that will make it stand out on first listen. Instead, Jesca Hoop has crafted an album that will cultivate a longer-term appreciation for nuanced songwriting, clever production, and impactful lyrics that will mean more to you five years from now than your standard folk pop. Lyrically, this is Hoop at her finest. Sonically, she’s at her widest. Give it time, and you’ll treasure your Long Wave Home, too.

Long wave home is released on several formats, including oxblood red vinyl, CD and download.

Professional ratings
Aggregate scores
Source	Rating
Metacritic	83
Review scores
Source	Rating
AllMusic	4/5 stars
Higher Plain Music	9/10 stars
Pitchfork	7.8/10 stars
Norman Records	8/10 stars
Buzz magazine	5/5 stars
Spectrum Culture	4/5 stars

== Track listing ==
All tracks are written by Jesca Hoop.

No.	Title	Length
1.	"Adam"	3:20
2.	"Now the Ash"	3:29
3.	"Designer Citizen"	3:28
4.	"Big Storm"	3:55
5.	"Love is Salvation"	4:24
6.	"Caravan"	4:00
7.	"Playground"	3:47
8.	"Signal to Noise"	3:59
9.	"Viv Over Drink"	2:29
10.	"Long Wave Home"	4:36

== Chart performance ==
Long Wave Home reached the following chart position:

Chart (2026)	Peak position
UK Album Sales	37
UK Album Download	31
UK Independent Albums	12
UK Independent Album Breakers	4
UK Physical Albums	44
UK Record Store	19

== Personnel ==
All personnel credits adapted from Long Wave Home sleeve notes.

- Jesca Hoop – guitar, voice, production
- Tim Thomas – mixing, chief engineering, guitar and vocal recording
- Jason Mitchell – mastering
- Jesse D. Vernon – arrangements, horns, harp, piano, tuned percussion, recording (Lisa Weisslinger, Abby Type, Yohav Oremiatski, and Phillippe Sirop)
- Rachel Rimmer – backing vocals
- Chloe Foy – backing vocals
- Ian Stewart – recording (Jesca Hoop, Rachel Rimmer, and Chloe Foy)
- Seb Rochford – drums, percussion
- Leo Abrahams – recording (Seb Rochford)
- Jon Thorne – bass
- Jim Homes – recording (Jon Thorne)
- Rob Homes – recording (Jon Thorne)
- Sam Amidon – fiddle, guitar, banjo, voice
- Jim Barr – recording (Sam Amidon)
- Stefan Amidon – additional recording (Sam Amidon)
- Pete Judge – flugelhorn
- Sam Hayfield – trombone
- Lorenzo Prati – saxophone
- Taz Mains – bassoon
- Harriet Riley – marimba, vibraphone
- Ben Waghorn – bass clarinet
- Louise Shwarz – piano, harp
- Lisa Weisslinger – additional instrumentation
- Abby Type – additional instrumentation
- Yohav Oremiatski – additional instrumentation
- Phillippe Sirop – additional instrumentation
- Mano McLaughlin – album artwork
- Aga Mortlock – photo insert
- Emma Beech – wardrobe
- Debbie Goldsmith – painting (photo background)
