= Hen's Teeth =

Studio album by Iron & Wine
- Released: February 27, 2026
- Studio: Waystation (Los Angeles)
- Length: 39:20
- Label: Sub Pop
- Producer: Sam Beam

Iron & Wine chronology
Light Verse (2024)	Hen's Teeth (2026)

Singles from Hen's Teeth
- 1. "Robin's Egg" Released: June 10, 2025; 2. "In Your Ocean" Released: January 7, 2026

Hen's Teeth is the eighth studio album by the American singer-songwriter Iron & Wine, released on February 27, 2026, by Sub Pop.

== Background ==
Hen's Teeth was recorded during the same sessions as Iron & Wine's previous album, Light Verse, at Dave Way's Waystation Studio in Laurel Canyon, Los Angeles. As with Light Verse, Hen's Teeth was produced by Sam Beam and features contributions from the same musicians: Tyler Chester on keyboards, Sebastian Steinberg on bass, David Garza on guitar, Paul Cartwright on violin, Griffin Goldsmith, Beth Goodfellow, and Kyle Crane on percussion. Unlike Light Verse, however, Hen's Teeth includes two duets with the Americana supergroup trio I'm with Her, who appear on the lead single "Robin's Egg" and on "Wait Up". It also includes contributions from Beam's daughter Arden, whose harmonies and backing vocals appear on the tracks "Roses", "Singing Saw", "Defiance, Ohio" and "Grace Notes". Beam has called the album a "sibling" or "fraternal twin" to Light Verse, comparing them to twins "that get along OK and don't really compete because they have their own interests. They're both unique but if you hear them speaking to one another you can tell they grew up in the same house". Regarding the album's title, Beam said Hen's Teeth was one he "always wanted to use", explaining, "I just love it. To me it suggests the impossible. Hen's teeth do not exist. And that's what this record felt like: a gift that shouldn't be there but it is. An impossible thing but it's real."

== Release and promotion ==
On June 10, 2025, Iron & Wine released the single "Robin's Egg", featuring I'm With Her, a month before the start of their co-headlining Robin's Egg Tour.

The album was announced on January 7, 2026, simultaneously with the release of the lead single "In Your Ocean". The second single, "Roses", was released on February 5, 2026. The album was released on February 27, 2026, by Sub Pop.

Iron & Wine supported the album with a tour beginning in Australia on February 28, 2026, continuing through New Zealand and North America. The North American leg, which was originally announced to conclude on May 17, was resumed in October for a further run of shows.

On August 27, 2026, Iron & Wine announced a deluxe edition of the album, which was released on September 22, 2026, on Sub Pop. It features four previously unreleased songs recorded during the album's session, along with acoustic versions of "In Your Ocean" and "Grace Notes". "California Sober" and the acoustic version of "In Your Ocean" were released as singles that same day.

== Critical reception ==
Professional ratings
Aggregate scores
Source	Rating
Metacritic	79/100
Review scores
Source	Rating
AllMusic	4/5 stars
Beats Per Minute	75%
Mojo	4/5 stars
MusicOMH	4/5 stars
Paste	B
Pitchfork	7.0/10
Record Collector	4/5 stars
Sputnikmusic	4.0/5
Uncut	8/10
Under the Radar	5/10

At Metacritic, which assigns a normalized rating out of 100 to reviews from professional publications, the album received an average score of 79, based on 11 reviews.

Tim Sendra of AllMusic wrote, "This record, and Light Verse, show that he is still searching, still working hard, and still able to imbue his albums with the same deep feeling and unstinting beauty that he has from the beginning."

== Track listing ==
All tracks are written by Sam Beam.

Hen's Teeth track listing
No.	Title	Length
1.	"Roses"	4:13
2.	"Paper and Stone"	3:35
3.	"Robin's Egg" (featuring I'm with Her)	3:04
4.	"Singing Saw"	3:17
5.	"In Your Ocean"	3:22
6.	"Defiance, Ohio"	3:39
7.	"Wait Up" (featuring I'm with Her)	3:45
8.	"Grace Notes"	5:09
9.	"Dates and Dead People"	6:00
10.	"Half Measures"	3:16
Total length:		39:20

Deluxe edition bonus tracks
No.	Title	Length
11.	"In Your Ocean (Acoustic)"	3:30
12.	"Grace Notes (Acoustic)"	4:47
13.	"Three Strangers"	3:49
14.	"California Sober"	3:20
15.	"Pilgrim's Highway"	3:33
16.	"Say What"	3:14
Total length:		61:33

== Personnel ==
- Sam Beam – vocals, guitar, production, artwork, artwork direction
- Arden Beam – vocals
- Paul Jacob Cartwright – violin, viola, mandolin, mandola, tenor guitar, string arrangements
- Tyler Chester – piano, organ, keys
- David Garza – guitars, zither, kalimba
- Griffin Goldsmith – drums, percussion
- Beth Goodfellow – drums, percussion
- Kyle Crane – drums, percussion
- Sebastian Steinberg – bass
- Sarah Jarosz – vocals
- Aoife O'Donovan – vocals
- Sara Watkins – vocals
- Dave Way – recording
- Gary Paczosa – additional recording
- Darren Schneider – additional recording
- Dusty Summers – artwork direction

== Charts ==
Chart performance for Hen's Teeth
Chart (2026)	Peak position
Scottish Albums (Official Charts)	87
UK Album Downloads (Official Charts)	42
UK Americana Albums (Official Charts)	12
UK Independent Albums (Official Charts)	24
