= Lion's mane =

Lion's mane may refer to:

- Mane (lion), the mane of the adult male lion, the fur around its face
- Lion's mane jellyfish
- Lion's mane mushroom
- Lion's mane nudibranch
- "The Adventure of the Lion's Mane", a Sherlock Holmes short story by Sir Arthur Conan Doyle
- "Lion's Mane", a song by Iron & Wine from the album The Creek Drank the Cradle

== See also ==
- Lion-Mane, four characters in DC Comics
