= Who Can See Forever Soundtrack =

Soundtrack album by Iron & Wine
- Released: 17 November 2023
- Recorded: 2018
- Venue: Haw River Ballroom, Saxapahaw, North Carolina
- Length: 75:59
- Label: Sub Pop
- Producer: Sam Beam

Iron & Wine chronology
Years to Burn (2019)	Who Can See Forever Soundtrack (2023)	Light Verse (2024)

Who Can See Forever Soundtrack is a soundtrack album by American singer-songwriter Iron & Wine that accompanies the 2023 documentary and concert film Who Can See Forever, directed by Josh Sliffe. The documentary is based around one of Iron & Wine's performances at the Haw River Ballroom in Saxapahaw, North Carolina. The album was released on November 17, 2023, through Sub Pop, and received acclaim from critics.

== Critical reception ==
Professional ratings
Aggregate scores
Source	Rating
Metacritic	74/100
Review scores
Source	Rating
AllMusic	4/5 stars
Mojo	3/5 stars
Uncut	7/10

Who Can See Forever Soundtrack received a score of 74 out of 100 on review aggregator Metacritic based on four critics' reviews, indicating "generally favorable" reception. Tim Sendra of AllMusic called the live tracks "stirring versions" that sound "at once intimate and exploratory", writing that the band "proves fully adept at the hushed ballads that are Beam's trademark, but also can shoot out dramatic sparks". Uncut wrote that it "stands up fine as a live album in its own right", while Mojo felt that "'Grace for Saints and Ramblers', from 2013's Ghost on Ghost, is delivered with nonchalant Lou Reed rhythm; 2017's 'About a Bruise' displays a freewheeling agility, while 'The Trapeze Swinger' plays right into Beam's storytelling mode".

== Track listing ==
All tracks are written by Sam Beam.

Who Can See Forever Soundtrack track listing
No.	Title	Length
1.	"The Trapeze Swinger"	7:17
2.	"Boy with a Coin"	3:10
3.	"Woman King"	4:06
4.	"Thomas County Law"	3:10
5.	"House by the Sea"	5:26
6.	"About a Bruise"	3:15
7.	"Sodom, South Georgia"	4:46
8.	"Last Night"	3:01
9.	"Monkeys Uptown"	5:15
10.	"Wolves (Song of the Shepherd's Dog)"	3:53
11.	"Grace for Saints and Ramblers"	4:14
12.	"Dearest Forsaken"	3:17
13.	"Glad Man Singing"	4:04
14.	"On Your Wings"	3:30
15.	"Passing Afternoon"	3:51
16.	"Pagan Angel and a Borrowed Car"	4:38
17.	"Naked as We Came"	2:21
18.	"Call Your Boys"	3:47
19.	"Muddy Hymnal"	2:58
Total length:		75:59

== Personnel ==
- Sam Beam – vocals, guitar
- Sebastian Steinberg – bass guitar
- Beth Goodfellow – drums and percussion
- Teddy Rankin-Parker – cello
- Eliza Hardy Jones – keyboard
