= Order of Romance =

Studio album by Jesca Hoop
- Released: 16 September 2022
- Genres: Alternative, folk, rock, pop
- Length: 37:59
- Label: Memphis Industries

Jesca Hoop chronology
| Stonechild (2019) | Order of Romance (2022) | Long Wave Home (2026) |

Alternative cover
- Order of Romance- limited edition sky blue vinyl cover.

Singles from Order of Romance
- 1. "Hatred Has a Mother" Released: July 2022; 2. "Sioux Falls" Released: July 2022; 3. "Sudden Light" Released: August 2022

Order of Romance is the sixth studio album by singer-songwriter Jesca Hoop. It was released in September 2022 on the British Memphis Industries label.

== Background ==
As with Hoop's previous album, Order of Romance was recorded at J&J Studios in Bristol, UK and produced by John Parish. The album was written during the Covid-19 pandemic and completed in 2021.

In an interview for Meet our Makers, Hoop reflects on the title and themes of the records, inspired in part by watching the world and its people struggle with love and nature, in as much as people often don't consider themselves as being part of nature. The album also has songs mirroring the political landscape of the time, as well as touching on the relationship with her mother. Hoop also discusses the album recording process which she describes as "quick-fire", ensuring that she's fully prepared beforehand, and gaining the most from limited studio time.

In a review for Higher Plain Music, Simon Smith writes, "“Like I Am Time”, “Firestorm” and “Lyrebird” are all beautiful ballads. “Lyrebird” is beautifully simple and warm in a way we don't often hear and it makes it refreshing, closer to what is an album that manages to make the minimal sound complex". He sums up the record, "Order of Romance is a tricky album as, just like love itself, it doesn’t reveal itself right away. It took me several listens to get into the groove with it and now it feels like a staple. Jesca Hoop’s ability to juggle unusual song structures that constantly evolve whilst staying intimate and fluid is powerful. It’s also no more obviously present than here. This isn’t the most immediately accessible release she has done to date, but it is one of the most satisfying when it clicks".

Order of Romance was available on several formats, including red ripple vinyl LP, sky blue vinyl LP (alternative cover) with 7" flexi-disk, black vinyl, CD and download.

Professional ratings
Review scores
| Source | Rating |
|---|---|
| AllMusic | 3.5/5 stars |
| Higher Plain Music | 8/10 stars |
| Norman Records | 4/5 stars |

== Track listing ==
All tracks are written by Jesca Hoop.

| No. | Title | Length |
|---|---|---|
| 1. | "Sudden Light" | 3:47 |
| 2. | "I Was Just 14" | 3:37 |
| 3. | "Hatred Has a Mother" | 3:59 |
| 4. | "One Way Mirror" | 3:55 |
| 5. | "Silent Extinction" | 4:23 |
| 6. | "7lbs of Pressure" | 4:00 |
| 7. | "Sioux Falls" | 4:01 |
| 8. | "Like I am Time" | 3:52 |
| 9. | "Firestorm" | 2:53 |
| 10. | "Lyrebird" | 3:32 |

== Chart performance ==
Order of Romance reached the following chart position:

| Chart (2022) | Peak position |
|---|---|
| UK Album Sales | 42 |
| UK Album Download | 41 |
| UK Independent Albums | 21 |
| UK Independent Album Breakers | 5 |
| UK Physical Albums | 44 |
| UK Record Store | 16 |
| UK Vinyl Albums | 26 |
| UK Scottish Albums | 71 |

== Personnel ==
All personnel credits adapted from Order of Romance's sleeve notes.

- Performed by Seb Rochford, John Parish, John Thorne, Rachel Rimmer, Chloe Foy, Taz Mains, Clarissa Payne, Sam Hayfield, Pete Judge, Lorenzo Prati and Jesca Hoop
- Horn/wind arrangements by Jesse Vernon

Technical personnel

- Produced by John Parish
- Engineered by Oliver Baldwin
- Recorded at J&J Studios
- Mixed by John Parish and Ali Chant at The Playpen
- Mastered by Jason Mitchell at Loud Mastering

Design

- Album art by Sophie Darling
- Photo by Aga Debiec
- Hoop's outfit made by Sophie Darling and Ana Bernau
- Album design by Mano McLaughlin
