= Light Verse (album) =

Studio album by Iron & Wine
- Released: April 26, 2024
- Length: 42:59
- Label: Sub Pop
- Producer: Sam Beam

Iron & Wine chronology
Who Can See Forever Soundtrack (2023)	Light Verse (2024)	Hen's Teeth (2026)

Light Verse is the seventh studio album by the American singer-songwriter Iron & Wine, released on April 26, 2024, by Sub Pop. It is Sam Beam's first solo album since Beast Epic (2017), and follows his collaborative album with Calexico, Years to Burn (2019).

== Background ==
Light Verse was produced by Sam Beam and features contributions from Tyler Chester on keyboards, Sebastian Steinberg on bass, David Garza on guitar, Paul Cartwright on violin, Griffin Goldsmith, Beth Goodfellow, and Kyle Crane on percussion. Fiona Apple contributed additional vocals on "All in Good Time". Beam says the title Light Verse came from the process of making the album, which he says, "felt like coming out of a tunnel into a kind of light."

== Promotion ==
The album was announced on February 7, 2024, simultaneously with the release of the lead single "You Never Know".

Iron & Wine supported the album by headlining a 2024 summer tour throughout North America and a fall tour through Europe.

== Critical reception ==
Professional ratings
Aggregate scores
Source	Rating
Metacritic	82/100
Review scores
Source	Rating
AllMusic	4/5 stars
Clash	(8/10)
The Line of Best Fit	(8/10)
Spin	B+
Sputnikmusic	(3.8/5)
Under the Radar	(7.5/10)

Light Verse was met with "universal acclaim" reviews from critics. At Metacritic, which assigns a weighted average rating out of 100 to reviews from mainstream publications, the release received an average score of 82, based on 12 reviews.

== Track listing ==
All tracks are written by Sam Beam.

Light Verse track listing
No.	Title	Length
1.	"You Never Know"	4:51
2.	"Anyone's Game"	3:49
3.	"All in Good Time"	4:15
4.	"Cutting It Close"	3:00
5.	"Taken by Surprise"	5:20
6.	"Yellow Jacket"	3:26
7.	"Sweet Talk"	3:39
8.	"Tears That Don't Matter"	6:54
9.	"Bag of Cats"	3:23
10.	"Angels Go Home"	4:22
Total length:		42:59

== Personnel ==
- Sam Beam – production
- Dave Way – mixing, engineering
- Paul Cartwright – arrangement (tracks 3, 5, 8, 10)
- Fiona Apple – vocals, track 3

== Charts ==
Chart performance for Light Verse
Chart (2024)	Peak position
Scottish Albums (Official Charts)	49
UK Album Downloads (Official Charts)	36
UK Independent Albums (Official Charts)	11
UK Record Store (OCC)	32
