= Where Shall We Begin =

Studio album by Chloe Foy
- Released: 11 June 2021
- Length: 40:43
- Label: Chloe Foy Music

Chloe Foy chronology
Where Shall We Begin (2021)	Complete Fool (2025)

Where Shall We Begin is the debut studio album by British singer-songwriter Chloe Foy. It was released on 11 June 2021, by her own label Chloe Foy Music.

== Background ==
On 23 February 2021, Chloe Foy announced the first single "Left-Centered Weight".

Foy then announced on 23 March 2021, that she was releasing her debut album, alongside second single "Shining Star".

== Critical reception ==
Professional ratings
Aggregate scores
Source	Rating
Metacritic	79/100
Review scores
Source	Rating
Beats Per Minute	74%
The Line of Best Fit	(9/10)
Clash	(8/10)
MusicOMH	4/5 stars

Where Shall We Begin was met with "generally favorable" reviews from critics. At Metacritic, which assigns a weighted average rating out of 100 to reviews from mainstream publications, this release received an average score of 79, based on 5 reviews.

== Track listing ==
Where Shall We Begin track listing
No.	Title	Length
1.	"Where Shall We Begin"	3:02
2.	"Deserve"	4:36
3.	"Work of Art"	3:34
4.	"Evangeline"	4:28
5.	"Asylum"	4:26
6.	"Bones"	4:40
7.	"Shining Star"	3:11
8.	"Left-Centered Weight"	4:03
9.	"And It Goes"	4:59
10.	"Square Face"	3:39

== Charts ==
Chart performance for Where Shall We Begin
Chart (2021)	Peak position
UK Folk Albums (Official Charts)	24
