= The House That Jack Built (album) =

Studio album by Jesca Hoop
- Released: 26 June 2012
- Genre: Alternative, folk, rock, pop
- Length: 39:34
- Label: Bella Union / Last Laugh Records

Jesca Hoop chronology
Snowglobe (2011)	The House That Jack Built (2012)	Undress (2014)

Singles from The House That Jack Built
- 1. "Born To" Released: May 2012; 2. "Hospital" Released: July 2012; 3. "Ode to Banksy" Released: 2013

The House That Jack Built is the third studio album by singer-songwriter Jesca Hoop. It was released in June 2012 on the Bella Union label and on Last Laugh Records.

== Background ==
Following on from the previous album, The House That Jack Built was written by Hoop at home in the UK and subsequently recorded at Tony Berg's Zeitgeist studio in Los Angeles. In an interview with John Freeman for The Quietus, Hoop explained that,"Initially, I sent the songs as raw material with my own performance and vocals, so they could stretch me in whatever direction. The track ‘The House That Jack Built’ was amended by Blake, the guitarist, and it’s actually a co-write – as is ‘Pack Animal’."

"The House That Jack Built"

Both the title track and "DNR" are dedicated to Hoop's father, who's passing a year earlier inspired the deeply personal tracks. In the same interview Hoop mentioned that, "While the circumstances are specific and the details are idiosyncratic to my own experience, the foundations of the songs are universal...shared by millions...and worthy of asking people to listen".

Kevin Harley for the BBC music wrote, "Hoop’s third album repeats her second’s tricks, only more so: broader, friskier and sharper, its earthy and mercurial spins on alt-folk brim with charisma, feeling and fecund reserves of imagination".

In 2021, Hoop released The Deconstruction of Jack's House, an acoustic version of songs from The House That Jack Built.

Professional ratings
Aggregate scores
Source	Rating
Metacritic	78/100
Review scores
Source	Rating
AllMusic	4/5 stars
MusicOMH	4/5 stars
StGA	4/5 stars
The Guardian	3/5 stars

== Track listing ==
All tracks are written by Jesca Hoop.

No.	Title	Length
1.	"Born To"	3:44
2.	"Pack Animal"	2:37
3.	"Peacemaker"	4:43
4.	"Hospital (Win Your Love)"	3:48
5.	"The House That Jack Built"	4:12
6.	"Ode to Banksy"	4:06
7.	"Dig This Record"	4:01
8.	"DNR"	4:16
9.	"Deeper Devastation"	4:46
10.	"When I'm Asleep"	3:21

== Chart performance ==
The House That Jack Built reached the following chart position:

Chart (2012)	Peak position
UK Independent Albums	18

== Personnel ==
All personnel credits adapted from The House That Jack Built's sleeve notes.

- Vocals – Jesca Hoop
- Additional vocals – Nicole Eva Emery
- Guitars – Jesca Hoop, Blake Mills

Technical personnel

- Engineering – Shawn Everett
- Production – Shawn Everett, Blake Mills, Tony Berg
- Recording, mixing and mastering – Shawn Everett
- Additional recording – Tony Berg, Paul Mortlock, Lionel Darenne

Design

- Photography – Aga Dibiec, Beth Hoeckel
- Layout – Melanie Knott, Tash Willcocks
- Contributions by Cornelia Irmen
