= Sing into My Mouth =

Studio album by Iron & Wine and Ben Bridwell
- Released: July 17, 2015
- Studio: Echo Mountain Recording (Asheville, North Carolina)
- Genre: Rock; indie rock; folk; world; country
- Length: 44:45
- Label: Brown Records, Black Cricket
- Producer: Sam Beam

Iron & Wine chronology
Archive Series Volume No. 1 (2015)	Sing into My Mouth (2015)	Love Letter for Fire (2016)

Sing into My Mouth is a covers album by Iron & Wine and Ben Bridwell of Band of Horses that was released on July 17, 2015. The album's title is a lyric from the Talking Heads song "This Must Be the Place (Naive Melody)".

== Reception ==
Sing into My Mouth has been given a Metacritic score of 61 based on 17 reviews, indicating generally favorable reviews.

The album debuted at No. 116 on Billboard 200, and No. 14 on Top Rock Albums. with around 4,000 copies sold in its first week. It has sold 14,000 copies in the United States as of April 2016.

== Track listing ==
1. "This Must Be the Place (Naive Melody)" (David Byrne, Chris Frantz, Jerry Harrison, and Tina Weymouth) – Talking Heads 3:31
2. "Done This One Before" (Ronnie Lane) – Ronnie Lane 2:59
3. "Any Day Woman" (Paul Siebel) – Bonnie Raitt 2:50
4. "You Know Me More Than I Know" (John Cale) – John Cale 3:29
5. "Bulletproof Soul" (Helen Adu, Andrew Hale, Stuart Matthewman) – Sade 4:39
6. "There's No Way Out of Here" (Kenneth Baker) – Unicorn 4:38
7. "God Knows (You Gotta Give to Get)" (Sarah Assbring) – El Perro del Mar 3:22
8. "The Straight and Narrow" (Jason Pierce) – Spiritualized 5:15
9. "Magnolia" (JJ Cale) – 3:51
10. "Am I a Good Man?" (Willie Clarke) – Them Two 3:47
11. "Ab's Song" (Toy Caldwell) – Marshall Tucker Band 1:19
12. "Coyote, My Little Brother" (Peter La Farge) – Peter La Farge 5:05

== Charts ==
Sales chart performance for Sing into My Mouth
Chart (2015)	Peak
Belgian Albums (Ultratop Flanders)	111
Belgian Albums (Ultratop Wallonia)	158
Dutch Albums (Album Top 100)	67
Irish Albums (IRMA)	83
US Billboard 200	116
US Folk Albums	4
US Independent Albums	9
US Top Rock Albums	14
