= Memories Are Now =

Studio album by Jesca Hoop
- Released: February 10, 2017
- Genre: Singer-songwriter, indie folk
- Length: 37:32
- Label: Sub Pop
- Producer: Blake Mills

Jesca Hoop chronology
Love Letter for Fire (2016)	Memories Are Now (2017)	Stonechild (2019)

Memories Are Now is the fourth solo studio album by American singer-songwriter Jesca Hoop. The album was released on February 10, 2017, through Sub Pop. It was produced by Blake Mills and features Fiona Apple on harmonica.

== Reception ==
Professional ratings
Aggregate scores
Source	Rating
Metacritic	83/100
Review scores
Source	Rating
AllMusic	4/5 stars

Memories Are Now received positive reviews from music critics upon release. At Metacritic, which assigns a normalized rating out of 100 to reviews from mainstream critics, the album received an average score of 83 based on 14 reviews, indicating 'universal acclaim'.

In a four-star review, AllMusic writer Marcy Donelson claimed, "The whole record, in fact, is injected with a heavy dose of gumption and irreverence, a spirit that, deliberate or not, seems timely in the sociopolitical climate of early 2017."

== Track listing ==
No.	Title	Length
1.	"Memories Are Now"	4:23
2.	"The Lost Sky"	3:51
3.	"Animal Kingdom Chaotic"	3:45
4.	"Simon Says"	3:19
5.	"Cut Connection" (featuring Fiona Apple)	3:45
6.	"Songs of Old"	4:43
7.	"Unsaid"	4:16
8.	"Pegasi"	3:34
9.	"The Coming"	5:56

== Personnel ==
- Jesca Hoop – vocals, guitar
- Blake Mills – backing vocals, bass, drums, guitar, producer
- Fiona Apple – harmonica (track 5)
- Greg Leisz – guitar, pedal steel (track 8)
- Rob Moose – strings (track 6)

Technical personnel

- Eric Caudieux – engineer
- Ian Sefchick – mastering
- Greg Koller – mixing
