= Undress (Jesca Hoop album) =

Studio album by Jesca Hoop
- Released: February 17, 2014
- Recorded: Paul Mortlock Home Studio, Zeitgeist Studios, Good Danny's and The Tabernacle Theatre.
- Length: 43:18
- Label: Last Laugh Records/Republic of Music
- Producer: Jesca Hoop

Jesca Hoop chronology
The House That Jack Built (2013)	Undress (2014)	Love Letter for Fire (2016)

Singles from Undress
- 1. "Whispering Light" Released: Jan 27, 2014

Undress is the 2014 studio album by Californian singer-songwriter Jesca Hoop, that features duets and acoustic re-workings of previously released material. Guest include Guy Garvey, Sam Beam, Willy Mason and Erika Wennerstrom. It was released in February 2014 under Last Laugh Records and financed through crowd funding. Digital editions contained the bonus track 'City Bird'.

== Track listing ==
No.	Title	Length
1.	"Murder of Birds" (featuring Guy Garvey)	4:52
2.	"The Kingdom"	3:24
3.	"Whispering Light" (featuring Willy Mason)	4:04
4.	"Four Dreams"	4:38
5.	"Bed Across the Sea"	4:06
6.	"Feast of the Heart"	3:46
7.	"Tulip" (featuring Erika Wennerstrom)	5:23
8.	"Hunting My Dress" (featuring Sam Beam)	4:44
9.	"Angel Mom"	5:29
10.	"While You Were Away"	3:49

== Personnel ==
- Jesca Hoop – vocals, guitar
- Tom Lloyd Goodwin – guitar on tracks 1, 2, 4, 5, 7, 9
- Guy Garvey;– Guest vocal on 'Murder of Birds'
- Rebecca Stephens – Backing Vocals on tracks 2, 4, 5, 9, 10
- Zoe Kyoti – Backing Vocals on tracks 2, 4, 5, 9, 10
- Pete Marshall – Drums on tracks 2, 5
- Willy Mason – Guest vocal and guitar on 'Whispering Light'
- Aoife O'Donovan – Harmony contributions on 'Whispering Light'
- Rebecca Stephens, Zoe Kyoti, Aga Debiec and Paul Mortlock – Stomps, claps and snaps on 'Four Dreams'
- Erika Wennerstrom – Guest vocal on 'Tulip'; backing vocals on 'Feast of the Heart'
- Jeff Johnston – Bass on tracks 6, 7
- Lucas Oswald – Vibraphone on tracks 6, 7
- Mathew Shephard – Drums on tracks 6, 7
- Carissa Hoop – Backing vocals on tracks 6, 7
- Sam Beam – Guest vocal and Guitar on 'Hunting My Dress'

Technical personnel

- Paul Mortlock – engineering except; 'Whispering Light' recorded by Tony Berg at Zeitgeist Studio; 'Feast of the Heart' and 'Tulip' by Danny Reisch at Good Danny's and 'Hunting My Dress' by Ryan Pickett with help from Tim Iseler at The Tabernacle Theatre.
- Paul Mortlock – mastering except 'Feast of the Heart' and 'Tulip' by Danny Reisch at Good Danny's.

Design

- Melanie Knott
