= Kiss Each Other Clean =

Studio album by Iron & Wine
- Released: January 25, 2011
- Genres: Indie folk; indie pop; blues; dream pop
- Length: 44:05
- Labels: Warner Bros.(US); 4AD (international)
- Producer: Brian Deck

Iron & Wine chronology
Around the Well (2009)	Kiss Each Other Clean (2011)	Ghost on Ghost (2013)

Singles from Kiss Each Other Clean
- 1. "Walking Far from Home" Released: November 26, 2010; 2. "Me and Lazarus" Released: 2011; 3. "Tree by the River" Released: 2011

Professional ratings
Review scores
Source	Rating
AllMusic	4/5 stars
BBC	(favourable)
BLARE	4/5 stars
The Guardian	4/5 stars
NME	(9/10)
Pitchfork	(7.7/10) link
Sputnikmusic	4/5 stars
Slant Magazine	4/5 stars
SPIN	(9/10)
The Independent	4/5 stars

Kiss Each Other Clean is the fourth studio album by Iron & Wine, released January 25, 2011 via 4AD (worldwide) and Warner Bros. in the US. The album's title is taken from the lyrics of "Your Fake Name Is Good Enough for Me".

The first track from the album, "Walking Far from Home," was released on November 26 in CD single and 12" vinyl versions as part of a special Record Store Day Black Friday event. The digital download version was released on November 30. The song "Tree by the River" has also been released, for free download, on Iron & Wine's website. On January 5, Iron & Wine performed all but one song from Kiss Each Other Clean live at the Greene Space in New York City for a live broadcast on NPR's website.

The album marks a further change in style – in an interview with Spin, Beam said “It’s more of a focused pop record. It sounds like the music people heard in their parent’s car growing up… that early-to-mid-’70s AM, radio-friendly music."

In 2017 it was ranked number 65 in Paste magazine's "The 100 Best Indie Folk Albums" list.

== Track listing ==
All songs written by Sam Beam.

Standard Edition

1. "Walking Far from Home" – 4:47
2. "Me and Lazarus" – 3:03
3. "Tree by the River" – 3:58
4. "Monkeys Uptown" – 3:48
5. "Half Moon" – 3:16
6. "Rabbit Will Run" – 5:30
7. "Godless Brother in Love" – 3:50
8. "Big Burned Hand" – 4:12
9. "Glad Man Singing" – 4:40
10. "Your Fake Name Is Good Enough for Me" – 7:01

iTunes Deluxe Version Bonus Tracks

11. "Black Candle" – 3:38
12. "Lean into the Light" – 4:07

== Personnel ==
Performers

- Joe Adamik
- Justin Amolsch
- Thomas Bartlett
- Sam Beam
- Jim Becker
- Stuart Bogie
- Rob Burger
- Tim Coffman
- Brian Deck
- Nate Lepine
- Matt Lux
- Benny Massarella
- Sarah Simpson
- Chad Taylor

Technical

- Brian Deck – production, mixing
- Jake Westermann – recording engineer
- Greg Calbi – mastering engineer

Artwork

- Sam Beam – photography, illustration
- The Heads of State – design, art direction

== Chart positions ==
Chart (2011)	Peak position
Australian Albums (ARIA)	36
Austrian Albums (Ö3 Austria)	74
Belgian Albums (Ultratop Flanders)	43
Belgian Heatseekers (Ultratop Flanders)	20
Belgian Heatseekers (Ultratop Wallonia)	4
Canadian Albums (Billboard)	15
Danish Albums (Hitlisten)	20
Dutch Albums (Album Top 100)	54
German Albums (Offizielle Top 100)	90
Irish Albums (IRMA)	14
New Zealand Albums (RMNZ)	32
Scottish Albums (Official Charts)	28
Norwegian Albums (VG-lista)	10
Swedish Albums (Sverigetopplistan)	24
Swiss Albums (Schweizer Hitparade)	57
UK Albums (Official Charts)	32
UK Independent Albums (Official Charts)	3
US Billboard 200	2
US Americana/Folk Albums (Billboard)	1
US Top Alternative Albums (Billboard)	1
US Top Rock Albums (Billboard)	1
