= Around the Well =

Compilation album by Iron & Wine
- Released: May 19, 2009
- Genre: Folk rock
- Length: 92:11
- Label: Sub Pop
- Producer: Iron & Wine

Iron & Wine chronology
The Shepherd's Dog (2007)	Around the Well (2009)	Kiss Each Other Clean (2011)

Professional ratings
Review scores
Source	Rating
Allmusic	3.5/5 stars
The A.V. Club	B−
BBC Music	favorable
NME	(8/10)
Pitchfork Media	(7.3/10)
Rock Sound	8/10 stars
Rolling Stone	4/5 stars
Spin	6/10 stars

Around the Well is a compilation of out-of-print and previously unreleased tracks by the folk rock artist Iron & Wine, released on May 19, 2009. Iron & Wine toured in May 2009 in support of this release.

== Track listing ==
All tracks written by Sam Beam, except where noted.

=== Disc 1 ===
1. "Dearest Forsaken" - 3:49
2. "Morning" - 2:41
3. "Loud as Hope" - 2:56
4. "Peng! 33" - 3:28 (Stereolab)
5. "Sacred Vision" - 3:19
6. "Friends They Are Jewels" - 4:14
7. "Hickory" - 4:35
8. "Waitin' for a Superman" - 4:34 (Wayne Coyne, Michael Ivins, Steven Drozd)
9. "Swans and the Swimming" - 3:24
10. "Call Your Boys" - 3:47
11. "Such Great Heights" - 4:11 (Ben Gibbard, Jimmy Tamborello)

=== Disc 2 ===
1. "Communion Cups & Someone's Coat" - 2:02
2. "Belated Promise Ring" - 3:45
3. "God Made the Automobile" - 3:54
4. "Homeward, These Shoes" - 1:34
5. "Love Vigilantes" - 3:26 (Bernard Sumner, Peter Hook, Stephen Morris, Gillian Gilbert)
6. "Sinning Hands" - 5:31
7. "No Moon" - 4:15
8. "Serpent Charmer" - 2:39
9. "Carried Home" - 6:31
10. "Kingdom of the Animals" - 5:05
11. "Arms of a Thief" - 3:41
12. "The Trapeze Swinger" - 9:31

The iTunes Store and Apple Music versions of the album also include a bonus track, Love Vigilantes (Alternate version).
