= Beast Epic (album) =

Studio album by Iron & Wine
- Released: August 25, 2017
- Recorded: The Loft
- Genre: Indie folk
- Length: 35:43
- Labels: Black Cricket Recording Company; Sub Pop
- Producer: Sam Beam

Iron & Wine chronology
Love Letter for Fire (2016)	Beast Epic (2017)	Years to Burn (2019)

Beast Epic is the sixth full-length studio album by Iron & Wine, released August 25, 2017 via both Black Cricket Recording Company and Sub Pop.

== Background ==
The album was announced on June 8, 2017, with a statement regarding the album's themes being provided along with tracklisting details. Sam Beam mentioned how time and aging were the main inspirations behind the album, stating "I have been and always will be fascinated by the way time asserts itself on our bodies and our hearts. The ferris wheel keeps spinning and we’re constantly approaching, leaving or returning to something totally unexpected or startlingly familiar. The rite of passage is an image I’ve returned to often because I feel we’re all constantly in some stage of transition. Beast Epic is saturated with this idea but in a different way simply because each time I return to the theme, I’ve collected new experiences to draw from. Where the older songs painted a picture of youth moving wide-eyed into adulthood’s violent pleasures and disappointments, this collection speaks to the beauty and pain of growing up after you’ve already grown up. For me, that experience has been more generous in its gifts and darker in its tragedies."

The music itself was noted by critics for its return to the earlier sounds of the project, with AllMusic writer Tim Sendra describing it as, "a conscious step back. Not only is he recording for Sub Pop again, he's stripped away most of the high production values, backing vocalists, horn sections, and orchestras that were all over his more recent work like spangles on an old denim jacket. This record was done with a small group, recorded relatively simply, and often recorded live as well. Beam and his cohorts take a less-is-more approach to coloring in his suitably autumnal melodies, and get a sound that compares favourably with the classic Our Endless Numbered Days LP."

== Reception ==
Professional ratings
Aggregate scores
Source	Rating
Metacritic	80/100
Review scores
Source	Rating
AllMusic	4/5 stars
Clash	7/10 stars
Consequence of Sound	B
Evening Standard	2/5 stars
The Guardian	4/5 stars
Pitchfork	7.5/10
The Quietus	4/5 stars
Rolling Stone	3.5/5 stars

Beast Epic received positive reviews from music critics upon release. At Metacritic, which assigns a normalized rating out of 100 to reviews from mainstream critics, the album received an average score of 80 based on 24 reviews, indicating 'generally favorable reviews'.

In a review for AllMusic, Tim Sendra wrote, "On the whole, Beast Epic has a lilting grace and pleasing simplicity that was missing from the last few Iron & Wine albums, and it's good to hear Beam working on a small scale again. To continue building the sound out into something bigger probably would have led to a collapse, or at the very least a hollow center." Philip Cosores was also positive in his write-up for Pitchfork, summarizing that "Sam Beam brings Iron & Wine full circle on his sixth album, using the warm acoustic instrumentation of his early work and some of the most moving singing of his career."

Awarding the album four-stars out of five, Ben Beaumont Thomas was also positive in his assessment for The Guardian, stating "Despite having a title that suggests a new thrash metal direction, Sam Beam’s sixth album as Iron & Wine essays yet more romantic, Americana-tinged songwriting, and it’s cosier than ever." Sean Guthrie also made similar remarks in his review for The Quietus, writing that "This record is snug, unthreatening and comforting, which means anyone looking for rage and catharsis ought to give it a wide berth. But for many of those preoccupied by the kind of concerns that trouble Sam Beam – chiefly thoughts of mortality and fallibility – Beast Epic will be a long, warm, healing embrace."

Not all the reviews for the album were positive. Writing on behalf of The Evening Standard, Richard Godwin's views were particularly critical of the album. He claimed that, "There’s little to entice one to spend that time, not when one could be listening to M Ward, Bonnie ‘Prince’ Billy or Bright Eyes, or any of the sounds of the universe. Overall, it's like discovering there's another micro-brewed IPA in the world."

== Track listing ==
No.	Title	Length
1.	"Claim Your Ghost"	2:24
2.	"Thomas County Law"	3:24
3.	"Bitter Truth"	3:02
4.	"Song in Stone"	3:21
5.	"Summer Clouds"	3:33
6.	"Call It Dreaming"	3:51
7.	"About a Bruise"	3:11
8.	"Last Night"	2:55
9.	"Right for Sky"	3:59
10.	"The Truest Stars We Know"	2:52
11.	"Our Light Miles"	3:11
Total length:		35:43

== Personnel ==
Iron & Wine

- Joe Adamik – autoharp, clarinet, drums, kalimba, marimba, percussion
- Sam Beam – vocals, guitars, producer
- Jim Becker – banjo, guitar, mandolin, violin
- Rob Burger – autoharp, clavinet, hammond, mellotron, organ, piano, synthesizer, vibraphone, violin, wurlitzer
- Teddy Rankin Parker – cello
- Sebastian Steinberg – bass
- Brian Wilkie – pedal steel

Technical

- Sara Barnes – cover art
- Richard Dodd – mastering
- Fort Lonesome – cover art
- Tom Schick – engineer, mixing
- Dusty Summers – design
- Josh Wool – photography

== Charts ==
Chart (2017)	Peak position
Australian Albums (ARIA)	83
Belgian Albums (Ultratop Flanders)	58
Belgian Albums (Ultratop Wallonia)	180
Canadian Albums (Billboard)	77
Dutch Albums (Album Top 100)	93
Irish Albums (IRMA)	95
Scottish Albums (Official Charts)	30
Spanish Albums (PROMUSICAE)	70
UK Albums (Official Charts)	60
US Billboard 200	44
US Top Alternative Albums (Billboard)	5
US Top Rock Albums (Billboard)	6
