= Kismet (Jesca Hoop album) =

Studio album by Jesca Hoop
- Released: September 18, 2007
- Genre: Folk, rock
- Length: 48:01
- Label: RED Ink Records
- Producer: Jesca Hoop, Damian Anthony, Tony Berg

Jesca Hoop chronology
Silverscreen Demos (2004)	Kismet (2007)	Hunting My Dress (2009)

Kismet (meaning "Destiny"), is the debut studio album by singer-songwriter Jesca Hoop. It was recorded at the Zeitgeist and Barefoot Studios and released in the US in September 2007 on the RED Ink Records label.

== Background ==
In advance of the launch, Kismet EP was released, featuring tracks "Seed of Wonder", "Enemy" and "Money". "Intelligentactile 101" was also available to download prior to launch.

According to Hoop, many of the songs on the album were "quite old". In one interview, she explained that "Out the Back Door" is a combination of, "Probably early '20s Jazz, or '30s and '40s maybe, and Hip-Hop. I love that combination. Actually, I wrote it years ago, and then the movie, Idlewild, came out and it kind of reinforced my concept in that arena".

When asked if she had an overall sound in mind when writing the album, Hoop replied, "The main criteria were to maintain a true dynamic of small and intimate and then more fantastical. So in order to create more of the fantastic, we tripped the songs to make them a little more rhythm-based. And then we indulged in sound effects and things like that. We wanted it to be really playful".

"Seed of Wonder"

In a review of Kismet for AllMusic, Jo-Ann Greene wrote, "Santa Monica fell under Jesca Hoop's spell in autumn 2006, making her "Seed of Wonder" the most requested song in its local radio station's history. Hoop re-recorded it for her debut Kismet album, with assistance from Stewart Copeland, whose complex, ever-shifting rhythms enhance the number's uniqueness, sliding it toward hip-hop here, prodding it into a Native American dance there".

Professional ratings
Review scores
Source	Rating
AllMusic	3.5/5 stars
Slant Magazine	3.5/5 stars

== Track listing ==
All tracks are written by Jesca Hoop, except track 11 by Jesca Hoop and David Baerwald.

No.	Title	Length
1.	"Summertime"	3:19
2.	"Seed of Wonder"	6:06
3.	"Enemy"	3:26
4.	"Silverscreen"	4:03
5.	"Money"	5:05
6.	"Dreams In The Hollow"	5:15
7.	"Love Is All We Have"	5:00
8.	"Intelligentactile 101"	4:20
9.	"Havoc In Heaven"	4:09
10.	"Out The Back Door"	3:24
11.	"Love And Love Again *"	3:54

== Personnel ==
All personnel credits adapted from Kismet's sleeve notes.

- Vocals – Jesca Hoop
- Guitars – Jesca Hoop, Blake Mills, Tony Berg, Roddy Cabello, David Baerwald
- Bass – Ian Walker, Blake Mills, Sam Farrar, Cedric Lemoyne
- Keyboards – Patrick Warren, Tony Berg, David Baerwald
- Drums – Matt Chamberlain, Stewart Copeland, Quinn Smith, José Pasillas
- Mandolin – David Baerwald
- Wind Instruments – Patrick Warren, Frank Lenz.
- Vibraphone – Frank Lenz
- Harmonium & Zither – Tony Berg
- Shamisen - Yoshida Brothers
- Piano – Sasha Smith
- Accordion – Patrick Warren
- Programing – Damian Anthony

Technical personnel

- Engineering – Damian Anthony, Shawn Everett, David Baerwald
- Additional engineering – Eric Valentine, Gabe Butler, Jake Davies
- Mixing – Shawn Everett
- Production – Jesca Hoop, Damian Anthony, Tony Berg
- Mastering – Brian Gardner

Design

- Art direction – Jesca Hoop, Dave Bett
- Illustrations – Alex Berg, Claudia Kunin, Nicholas Rubin
- Design – Christina Rodriguez
- Photography – Frank Ockenfels, Damian Anthony (cover), Dan Parker (inside)
