= Snowglobe (EP) =

EP by Jesca Hoop
- Released: March 7, 2011
- Recorded: Blueprint Studios, Salford, SSR Studios, Manchester, Future Works Studio, Manchester.
- Genre: Folk
- Length: 25:09
- Label: Last Laugh Records, Republic of Music
- Producer: Paul Mortlock, Mano McGlaughlin, Dave Jay

Jesca Hoop chronology
Hunting My Dress (2009)	Snowglobe (2011)	The House That Jack Built (2012)

Snowglobe is an EP by Jesca Hoop, self-released through Last Laugh Records on March 7, 2011. It was recorded after the artist moved to Manchester, England, although the material was written largely prior to the move. It contains four new songs, supplemented by two acoustic renditions of previously released songs. The track 'City Bird' was released as a free download on January 26, 2011, while the album was followed by a UK tour.

Hoop described the experiences of living in downtown LA in ‘City Bird’ where she found that “the block I moved onto was lined with these cardboard houses and people sleeping in doorways", which was contrasted with “expresses my absolute love for home” in ‘While You Were Away’. A leftover from her previous album Hunting My Dress, the song ‘Snowglobe’ referred to her mother's funeral, which she “would have put [...] the album to accompany the other two songs that I wrote for her, but the truth is that I could not sing it without getting choked up”. The regular a cappella curtain-closer for her live-shows, ‘Storms Make Grey the Sea’ was written "by the sea". Although describing them as folk songs, Hoop maintained that while "folk tends to go towards your intellect, [she also wants to] tap into how your body relates to music".

== Critical reception ==
The EP received some critical acclaim, with Drowned in Sound calling it "a concise but precise chapter in the Hoop story", while the NME described it as a 'deceptively opaque EP'. The Guardian explained that "musically at least, is simpler and starker. The focus is on Hoop's otherworldly voice (...) while cello and guitar wisp around her".

Professional ratings
Review scores
Source	Rating
NME	6/10
Drowned in Sound	7/10
Female First	4/5

== Track listing ==
All tracks are written by Jesca Hoop.

No.	Title	Length
1.	"City Bird"	4:15
2.	"While You Were Away"	3:49
3.	"Snowglobe"	4:58
4.	"Silverscreen (acoustic)"	4:04
5.	"Rêves Dans les Creux" (acoustic)"	5:47
6.	"Storms Make Grey the Sea"	2:14

== Personnel ==
- Jesca Hoop – vocals, guitar, piano, percussion
- Jon Thorne – double bass (track 1)
- Sophia Lineman – cello (track 1)
- Sam Morris – French horn (track 1)
- Tim Thomas – percussion (track 3)
- Jim Wallace – guitar (track 4)
- Rebecca Stephens – backing vocals (track 4)
- Zoe Chiotis – backing vocals (track 4)
- Dave Jay – musical box, vibraphone, guitars

Technical personnel

- Paul Mortlock – engineering, production (tracks 1,2) & mastering
- Mano McGlaughlin – production (track 3)
- Tim Thomas – engineering, mixing (track 3)
- Matt Killerby – engineering, mixing (track 4 and 6 (mixing)
- Marcus Alexander – engineering, mixing (track 5)
- Dave Jay – production, arrangement (track 5)
- Katell Sevellec – vocal coach (track 5)
- Jason Looney – engineering (track 6)

Design

- Melanie Knott – design
- Frank Ockenfels – photography
