= Stonechild (album) =

Studio album by Jesca Hoop
- Released: 5 July 2019
- Genres: Alternative rock, folk, pop
- Length: 44:19
- Label: Memphis Industries

Jesca Hoop chronology
Memories Are Now (2017)	Stonechild (2019)	Order of Romance (2022)

Singles from Stonechild
- 1. "Outside of Eden" Released: 2019; 2. "Red White and Black" Released: 12 July 2019; 3. "Shoulder Charge" Released: 22 November 2019

Stonechild is the fifth studio album by singer-songwriter Jesca Hoop. It was released in July 2019 on the British Memphis Industries label.

== Background ==
The record title comes from an exhibit in Philadelphia’s Mütter Museum of an unborn foetus a woman carried for over 30 years, a metaphor for, as Hoop puts it, “carrying something for a long time, perhaps in secret and then giving it up.”

Stonechild was the first from Hoop to have been recorded and produced in the UK. In an interview with Jeff Hemmings for Brightons Finest, Hoop recalled, "I spent a few weeks down in Bristol with John Parish (Aldous Harding, PJ Harvey, This Is The Kit), which was fun. All of my other records were with the same group, based out in Los Angeles." Hoop brought in a number of additional vocalists to create different layers and harmonies.

In another interview with Karen Gwee for Guitar.com, Hoop explained, “I went to alternate tunings for the need of a different set of voicings to work with. I needed my melodies and rhythms to shift and I turned to tuning to achieve that. The result varies from song to song. In some cases it draws out the folk in me, in others a painterly aesthetic.”

In a review for KLOF Magazine, Mike Davies offers critiques of the tracks; "You need to take time to ponder over these songs, but, fortunately, she couches them in engaging, light folksy melodies that make the going easier, even when she’s sticking it to white supremacy of the steady rolling chug of "Red White and Black"." Davies also provides a fitting summary, "Whether you just want to drift away in the soothing vocals and musical ambience or dig into her lyrical concerns, the album offers many rewards and, while it may confront death, it also embraces life, a reminder that, as she sings, 'You’ll learn to laugh once you’ve finished crying'.”

Stonechild was released on limited edition white/black marbled vinyl, black vinyl, CD, cassette and download.

Professional ratings
Aggregate scores
Source	Rating
Metacritic	82/100
Review scores
Source	Rating
AllMusic	4/5 stars
DIY	4/5 stars
The Irish Times	4/5 stars
The Line of Best Fit	9/10 stars
Pitchfork	7.7/10 stars

== Track listing ==
All tracks are written by Jesca Hoop.

No.	Title	Length
1.	"Free of the Feeling"	4:38
2.	"Shoulder Charge"	5:43
3.	"Old Fear of Father"	3:13
4.	"Footfall to the Path"	3:46
5.	"Death Row"	5:00
6.	"Red White and Black"	3:16
7.	"01 Tear"	3:17
8.	"All Time Low"	4:19
9.	"Outside of Eden"	3:09
10.	"Passage's End"	4:38
11.	"Time Capsule"	3:20

== Chart performance ==
Stonechild reached the following chart positions:

Chart (2019)	Peak position
UK Album Sales	22
UK Album Downloads	100
UK Americana	2
UK Independent Albums	4
UK Independent Album Breakers	1
UK Physical Albums	24
UK Record Store	2
UK Vinyl Albums	4
UK Scottish Albums	61

== Personnel ==
All personnel credits adapted from Stonechild's sleeve notes.

- Performed by Jesca Hoop, John Parish, Lucius, Jim Barr, Jeremy Hogg, Kate Stables (appears courtesy of Rough Trade Records), Rozi Plain, Justis Hoop, Garza & Lucas Oswald

Technical personnel

- Produced by John Parish
- Recorded by Oliver Baldwin at J&J Studios
- Mixed by John Parish and Ali Chant at Toybox Studios
- Mastered by Jason Mitchell at Loud Mastering
- Additional recording by Gus Seyffert, Tom Piper, Lucus Oswald
- Published by Mothership/Curuja Songs

Design

- Album design by Mano McLaughlin
- Photos by Aga Debiec
