= Love Letter for Fire =

Studio album by Sam Beam and Jesca Hoop
- Released: April 15, 2016
- Studios: Flora Recording & Playback, Portland, Oregon
- Genre: Indie folk
- Length: 38:50
- Label: Sub Pop
- Producer: Tucker Martine

Iron & Wine chronology
Sing into My Mouth (2015)	Love Letter for Fire (2016)	Beast Epic (2017)

Jesca Hoop chronology
Undress (2014)	Love Letter for Fire (2016)	Memories Are Now (2017)

Singles from Love Letter for Fire
- 1. "Every Songbird Says" Released: February 10, 2016; 2. "Valley Clouds" Released: March 10, 2016

Love Letter for Fire is a collaborative album by American singer-songwriter Sam Beam, commonly known as Iron & Wine, and American singer-songwriter Jesca Hoop, released on April 15, 2016, on Sub Pop.

Love Letter for Fire was recorded at Flora Recording & Playback in Portland, Oregon. The album features contributions from Wilco's Glenn Kotche, Rob Burger, Eyvind Kang, Sebastian Steinberg, and Edward Rankin-Parker. It was produced, recorded, and mixed by Tucker Martine. Iron & Wine and Jesca Hoop toured North America in support of the album, starting in May 2016.

== Critical reception ==
Professional ratings
Aggregate scores
Source	Rating
Metacritic	79/100
Review scores
Source	Rating
AllMusic	4/5 stars
The A.V. Club	B+
Consequence of Sound	B
The Guardian	4/5 stars
MusicOMH	3.5/5 stars
Paste	7.9/10
Pitchfork	7.5/10
PopMatters	9/10 stars

Love Letter for Fire received largely positive reviews from contemporary music critics. At Metacritic, which assigns a normalized rating out of 100 to reviews from mainstream critics, the album received an average score of 79, based on 17 reviews, which indicates "generally favorable reviews".

Emmanuel Elone of PopMatters praised the album, stating, "By playing on the strengths of both artists while minimizing any deficiencies each may have, Sam Beam and Jesca Hoop have mastered the collaborative album. Where Iron & Wine can sound a bit too sleepy, Hoop plays up her vocals or instrumentation to keep the music lively; if she begins to make her performance a bit too grandiose, Beam is there to keep her feet on level ground. As a whole, Love Letter for Fire is the sonic equivalent of sitting in front of a campfire on the starry night with a couple of close friends strumming their acoustic guitar; it’s bucolic, simple, and guaranteed to delight. So grab some hot chocolate, put on the most comfortable pair of sweatpants that you can find, and let Sam Beam and Jesca Hoop serenade you with their majestic voices. If that’s not magical, nothing is."

Allison Hussey of Pitchfork gave the album a favorable review, stating, "Instead of a love letter to consuming blazes, Hoop's and Beam's collection appeals to our individual internal pilot lights: those softly smoldering flames that illuminate moments of beauty in ourselves, in each other, and beyond." Mark Deming of AllMusic gave the album a favorable review, stating, "Love Letter for Fire sounds like Beam and Hoop were born to work together. The yin and yang of their individual perspectives fit together marvelously, and this rests comfortably with the best of both their recorded works."

=== Accolades ===
Publication	Accolade	Year	Rank
Paste	The 50 Best Albums of 2016	2016	34

== Track listing ==
All tracks are written by Sam Beam and Jesca Hoop.

No.	Title	Length
1.	"Welcome to Feeling"	0:58
2.	"One Way to Pray"	3:28
3.	"The Lamb You Lost"	3:31
4.	"We Two Are a Moon"	2:34
5.	"Midas Tongue"	3:03
6.	"Know the Wild That Wants You"	2:57
7.	"Every Songbird Says"	3:23
8.	"Bright Lights and Goodbyes"	3:43
9.	"Kiss Me Quick"	2:44
10.	"Chalk It Up to Chi"	2:20
11.	"Valley Clouds"	3:20
12.	"Soft Place to Land"	3:34
13.	"Sailor to Siren"	3:15
Total length:		38:50

== Personnel ==
Credits adapted from the liner notes of Love Letter for Fire.

Main personnel

- Sam Beam – guitar, vocals, songwriting
- Jesca Hoop – guitar, vocals, songwriting
- Rob Burger – keyboards, string arrangement
- Sebastian Steinberg – bass
- Edward Rankin-Parker – cello
- Glenn Kotche – drums, percussion
- Eyvind Kang – violin, viola

Additional personnel

- Tucker Martine – production, recording, mixing
- Michael Finn – assistant engineering
- Richard Dodd – mastering
- John Golden – vinyl mastering
- Keegan Curry – additional technician assistance
- Josh Wool – back cover photography
- Lissa Gotwals – front cover photography
- Dusty Summers – design
- Jesca Hoop – design
- Sam Beam – design

== Charts ==
Chart (2016)	Peak position
UK Albums (OCC)	163
UK Americana Albums (Official Charts)	21
US Billboard 200	174
US Americana/Folk Albums (Billboard)	7
US Heatseekers Albums (Billboard)	1
US Independent Albums (Billboard)	15
US Top Alternative Albums (Billboard)	14
US Top Rock Albums (Billboard)	20
