= Ghost on Ghost =

Studio album by Iron & Wine
- Released: April 16, 2013
- Genres: Indie pop, indie folk, jazz, blues
- Length: 44:04
- Labels: 4AD, Nonesuch
- Producers: Brian Deck, Sam Beam

Iron & Wine chronology
Kiss Each Other Clean (2011)	Ghost on Ghost (2013)	Archive Series Volume No. 1 (2015)

Singles from Ghost on Ghost
- 1. "Lovers' Revolution" Released: January 31, 2013; 2. "Grace for Saints and Ramblers" Released: February 25, 2013

Professional ratings
Aggregate scores
Source	Rating
Metacritic	76/100
Review scores
Source	Rating
Allmusic	4/5 stars
American Songwriter	4/5 stars
The A.V. Club	B+
Blurt	4/5 stars
Consequence of Sound	3/5 stars
The Independent	5/5 stars
The Line of Best Fit	9/10
Paste	8.5/10
Pitchfork	6.1/10
Sputnikmusic	2.9/5

Ghost on Ghost is the fifth full-length studio album by Iron & Wine, released April 16, 2013 via 4AD (worldwide) and Nonesuch in the US. The album's title is taken from the lyrics of "Grace for Saints and Ramblers" and the cover is taken from photographer Barbara Crane's series "Private Views." Ghost on Ghost exhibits jazz, pop, and R&B influences and contains a more relaxed style and approach in comparison to Beam's previous two albums, which he felt contained an "anxious tension" he wanted to move away from.

The album debuted at No. 26 on Billboard 200, and No. 9 on Rock Albums, selling 16,000 copies in its first week. The album has sold 51,000 copies in the United States as of June 2015.

== Track listing ==
No.	Title	Length
1.	"Caught in the Briars"	3:12
2.	"The Desert Babbler"	3:27
3.	"Joy"	2:30
4.	"Low Light Buddy of Mine"	3:29
5.	"Grace for Saints and Ramblers"	3:36
6.	"Grass Widows"	2:53
7.	"Singers and the Endless Song"	3:38
8.	"Sundown (Back in the Briars)"	2:18
9.	"Winter Prayers"	3:11
10.	"New Mexico's No Breeze"	4:27
11.	"Lovers' Revolution"	5:40
12.	"Baby Center Stage"	5:39
Total length:		44:04

== Personnel ==
Iron & Wine

- Sam Beam – vocals, guitars
- Rob Burger – acoustic and electric pianos, organ (1, 4, 6, 11, 12), clavinet (4), celesta (5), hammered dulcimer (4), Jew's harp (4), tubular bells (10)
- Tony Garnier – bass (1, 2, 4, 5, 6, 7, 10, 12)
- Tony Scherr – upright bass (3, 8, 9), ukulele bass (4), guitar (3)
- Brian Blade – drums & percussion (1, 2, 4, 5, 6, 7, 10, 11, 12)
- Kenny Wollesen – drums & percussion (1, 3, 5, 7, 8, 9), bowed vibraphone (9)
- Paul Niehaus – pedal steel guitar (2, 7, 9, 12)

== Chart positions ==
Chart (2013)	Peak position
Belgian Albums (Ultratop Flanders)	61
Belgian Albums (Ultratop Wallonia)	153
Dutch Albums (Album Top 100)	88
Finnish Albums (Suomen virallinen lista)	48
Norwegian Albums (VG-lista)	32
Swedish Albums (Sverigetopplistan)	43
Swiss Albums (Schweizer Hitparade)	100
UK Albums (Official Charts)	40
US Billboard 200	26
US Rock Albums (Billboard)	9
US Top Modern Rock/Alternative Albums (Billboard)	9
