= Jesca Hoop =

American singer-songwriter (born 1975)

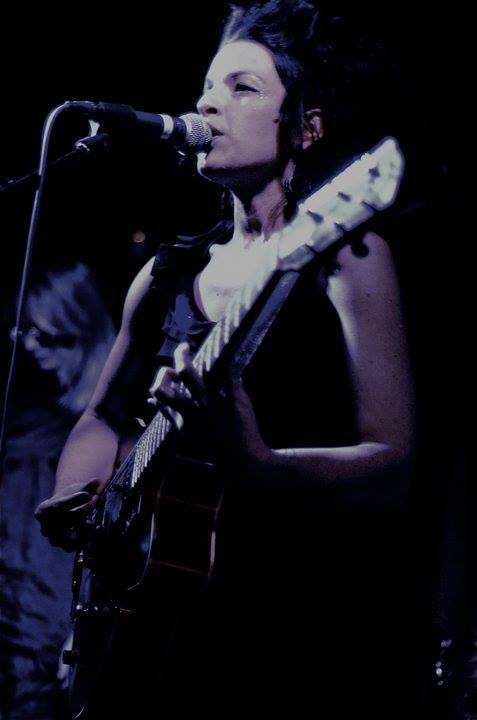
- Hoop live in concert

Background information
- Born: Jessica Ada Hoop; April 21, 1975 (age 51); Santa Rosa, California, U.S.
- Genres: alternative, blues, experimental, folk, Indie, jazz, pop, rock
- Occupation: Musician
- Instruments: Guitar, vocals
- Labels: SubPop (US); Last Laugh (UK); 3 Records/Columbia (US); Vanguard Records (US); Bella Union (US)
- Website: www.jescahoop.co.uk

Jessica Ada "Jesca" Hoop (born April 21, 1975) is an American singer-songwriter and guitarist, who writes and performs in diverse musical styles. She has released seven studio albums of her own, as well as live, acoustic and dual albums with others.

== Biography ==
=== Early life ===
Hoop was born in Santa Rosa, California, to traditional Mormon parents Janette and Jack Dennis Hoop. She grew up singing hymns and folk tunes with her family in four-part harmony. At age 14, her parents separated, and two years later she broke away from her Mormon religion. Hoop described abandoning her faith as a process of detoxification, saying, "Now I feel free of it: I have faith in people".

Hoop moved off the grid into the rural and wilderness areas of Northern California and Wyoming where she, "lived under a tree for a summer, in yurts, in cob dwellings, and in a chicken shack that I converted". At the age of 20 she was employed as a wilderness survival guide in a troubled teen industry program in Arizona. This course involved, "no camp, we would just walk, for two months. They would learn how to make fire by friction, and the experience was life changing. The environment was transforming".

=== Career ===
==== 2003–2007 ====
While she had been creating music since she was a teenager, being a survival guide provided Hoop with the "mental space to write as I worked". By 2000, Hoop had moved to Los Angeles where she became a nanny to Tom Waits' children. He and his wife Kathleen Brennan became instrumental in developing her career and brought her in contact with his music publisher Lionel Conway. His company gave her a publishing contract and "an advance, something to live off, and helped to develop". Conway sent a demo of the song "Seed of Wonder" to the DJ Nic Harcourt who began to play the song on Morning Becomes Eclectic on KCRW. It became one of the most requested songs on the show and created a considerable amount interest in the acoustic live shows Hoop had begun to play around Los Angeles. She then signed to Columbia Records’ subsidiary "3 Records" and developed her first record with Tony Berg, producer and head of 3 Records. Her debut album Kismet was released in September 2007 in the US. Following a reshuffle at Columbia, Hoop was dropped 3 months into the release.

==== 2008–present ====
Live at Union Chapel, London, May 2026

As a result of meeting Tom Piper, the touring manager of the band Elbow, Hoop moved to Manchester, England in 2008. Initially she found it difficult to adjust "as a California girl, I find it hard to stay under that canopy of cloud". After settling in the Chorlton area of the city, Hoop spent 18 months recording new material for the album Hunting My Dress which was released in 2010. She had parked "a lorry trailer in my back garden that we use as an extension (...) where I go to write". In the same year she signed with the US-based label Vanguard Records. It was followed by the Snowglobe EP in 2011, which consisted of a handful of tracks recorded prior to her move to the UK. Hoop described them as "folk songs" and the EP received a degree of critical acclaim. She worked as a backing singer on Peter Gabriel's New Blood Tour in 2011, including some TV performances. The following year she released The House That Jack Built. In 2013 and 2014 she released Complete Kismet Acoustic and Undress, re-interpretations of songs from her albums Kismet and Hunting My Dress respectively. In 2016, Hoop released Love Letter for Fire, an album of duets with American singer-songwriter Sam Beam (Iron & Wine). Jesca Hoop signed with the label Sub Pop and announced that she would release the album Memories Are Now on February 10, 2017. In 2019, Hoop released her fifth studio album Stonechild, which reached #1 in the UK Official Independent Album Breakers Chart. Order of Romance was release in 2022, and in 2026, Hoop launched Long Wave Home, followed by an international tour.

=== Collaborations ===
Hoop has collaborated with many recording artists, including Stewart Copeland, Guy Garvey, Willy Mason, Blake Mills, Shearwater, Erika Wennerstrom, The Ditty Bops and many more. Hoop's extensive touring since her debut record saw her opening for Mark Knopfler, Elbow, Placebo, EELS, Shuggie Otis, Iron & Wine, Andrew Bird, Punch Brothers, Shearwater and The Ditty Bops.

On April 15, 2016, Hoop released Love Letter for Fire, an album of duets with American singer-songwriter Iron & Wine, on Sub Pop. The album features contributions from Wilco's Glenn Kotche, Rob Burger, Eyvind Kang, Sebastian Steinberg, and Edward Rankin-Parker. It was produced, recorded, and mixed by Tucker Martine. Hoop and Iron & Wine toured North America in support of the album, starting in May 2016.

=== Style ===
Hoop's style has been characterised as largely experimental with folk, rock, and electronic influences. Her early mentor, Tom Waits, described it as, "like a four-sided coin. She is an old soul, like a black pearl, a good witch or a red moon. Her music is like going swimming in a lake at night".

She often finds that, "I have an identity crisis every time I write a catalogue of songs, I think: what is this music? Where does it fit?". She explained her tendency to move between a number of styles as, "I am impressed by the power of music and its ability to transform the vessel it enters. I am everyday affected by it. If I want to change my mood, I change my music".

== Discography ==
=== Studio Albums ===
- Kismet (2007)
- Hunting My Dress (2009)
- The House That Jack Built (2012)
- Memories Are Now (2017)
- Stonechild (2019)
- Order of Romance (2022)
- Long Wave Home (2026)

=== Acoustic Albums ===
- The Complete Kismet Acoustic (2013) – live acoustic versions of songs mostly from Kismet
- Undress (2014) – acoustic reinterpretations of songs from Hunting My Dress
- The Deconstruction of Jack's House (2021) –stripped back acoustic version of songs from The House That Jack Built
- Selective Memory (2025) – acoustic versions of songs from Memories Are Now

=== Albums with others ===
- Love Letter for Fire (with Sam Beam) (2016)

=== EPs ===
- Silverscreen Demos (2004)
- Kismet [EP] promo (2007)
- Kismet Acoustic (2008)
- Snowglobe (2011)
- Five Songs Live (2014)
