= Years to Burn =

Studio album by Calexico and Iron & Wine
- Released: June 14, 2019
- Studios: Sound Emporium (Nashville, Tennessee)
- Genre: Alternative rock
- Length: 32:12
- Label: Sub Pop

Calexico chronology
The Thread That Keeps Us (2018)	Years to Burn (2019)	Seasonal Shift (2020)

Iron & Wine chronology
Weed Garden (2018)	Years to Burn (2019)	Who Can See Forever Soundtrack (2023)

Singles from Years to Burn
- 1. "Father Mountain" Released: March 21, 2019

Professional ratings
Aggregate scores
Source	Rating
AnyDecentMusic?	7.2/10
Metacritic	77/100
Review scores
Source	Rating
AllMusic	4/5 stars
Exclaim!	7/10
musicOMH	4/5 stars
Pitchfork	7.4/10
The Skinny	4/5 stars
Under the Radar	7/10 stars

Years to Burn is the second album by Calexico and Iron & Wine. The artists previously worked together on the EP In the Reins (2005).

== Critical reception ==
Years to Burn was met with "generally favorable" reviews from critics. At Metacritic, which assigns a weighted average rating out of 100 to reviews from mainstream publications, the release received an average score of 77, based on 14 reviews.

== Track listing ==
All tracks are written by Calexico & Iron & Wine.

Years to Burn track listing
No.	Title	Length
1.	"What Heaven's Left"	4:53
2.	"Midnight Sun"	4:14
3.	"Father Mountain"	2:54
4.	"Outside El Paso"	1:52
5.	"Follow the Water"	3:46
6.	"The Bitter Suite (Pájaro / Evil Eye / Tennessee Train)"	8:16
7.	"Years to Burn"	3:08
8.	"In Your Own Time"	3:09
Total length:		32:12

== Personnel ==
- Sam Beam – vocals, acoustic guitar (all tracks except 4)
- Joey Burns – acoustic guitar, electric guitar
- John Convertino – drums, vibes (track 4)
- Paul Niehaus – pedal steel guitar (tracks 1, 2, 4, 6)
- Bob Burger - piano, accordion, organ, vibes (tracks 3, 6), prepared piano, piano organ, vocals (track 6)
- Sebastian Steinberg – electric bass, bowed upright bass (track 4), nylon string guitar (track 6), percussion, vocals (track 6)
- Jacob Valenzuela – trumpet (tracks 1, 4, 6, 7), vocals (track 6)

== Charts ==
Chart performance for Years to Burn
Chart (2019)	Peak position
Australia Physical Albums (ARIA)	88
Austrian Albums (Ö3 Austria)	13
Belgian Albums (Ultratop Flanders)	38
Dutch Albums (Album Top 100)	55
French Albums (SNEP)	179
German Albums (Offizielle Top 100)	16
Scottish Albums (Official Charts)	38
Spanish Albums (Promusicae)	53
Swiss Albums (Schweizer Hitparade)	46
