= The Shepherd's Dog =

Studio album by Iron and Wine
- Released: September 25, 2007
- Recorded: Engine Studios; Sterling Sound
- Genre: Folk rock
- Length: 49:45
- Label: Sub Pop
- Producers: Brian Deck, Sam Beam

Iron and Wine chronology
In the Reins (EP) with Calexico (2005)	The Shepherd's Dog (2007)	Around the Well (2009)

The Shepherd's Dog is the third full-length studio album by Iron & Wine, released on September 25, 2007. If bought at select retailers or if pre-ordered through Sub Pop, the album comes with a bonus disc featuring two unreleased tracks. "Boy with a Coin" is the first single and was released on July 10, 2007 via Sub Pop, including the single edit of the song along with two other tracks.

The album debuted at number 24 on the U.S. Billboard 200 chart, selling about 32,000 copies in its first week.

In 2008, "Flightless Bird, American Mouth" was used in the movie Twilight. The song was specifically chosen for the film's prom scene by Kristen Stewart, the female lead, and appears on the movie's soundtrack.

== Critical response ==
Professional ratings
Aggregate scores
Source	Rating
Metacritic	84/100
Review scores
Source	Rating
AllMusic	4.5/5 stars
The A.V. Club	B−
Blender	4/5 stars
Entertainment Weekly	A−
NME	7/10
Pitchfork	8.6/10
Q	4/5 stars
Rolling Stone	3.5/5 stars
Spin	4/5 stars
Uncut	4/5 stars

On its release The Shepherd's Dog received widespread critical acclaim. At Metacritic, which assigns a normalized rating out of 100 to reviews from mainstream critics, the album received an average score of 84, based on 34 reviews, which indicates "universal acclaim".

The album was ranked at #10 in Paste's list of top albums of 2007. "Pagan Angel and a Borrowed Car" was #86 on Rolling Stone's list of the 100 Best Songs of 2007. Pitchfork included the album in their Top 50 Albums of 2007 ranking it at number 36. "Flightless Bird, American Mouth" was a key track used in the 2008 film Twilight, part of the Twilight Saga. The song is closely associated to the successful movie franchise and an acoustic version of the song was also used in The Twilight Saga: Breaking Dawn - Part 1.

== Track listing ==
All tracks are written by Sam Beam.

No.	Title	Length
1.	"Pagan Angel and a Borrowed Car"	4:33
2.	"White Tooth Man"	3:57
3.	"Lovesong of the Buzzard"	4:26
4.	"Carousel"	4:02
5.	"House by the Sea"	4:22
6.	"Innocent Bones"	3:43
7.	"Wolves (Song of the Shepherd's Dog)"	4:57
8.	"Resurrection Fern"	4:50
9.	"Boy With a Coin"	4:06
10.	"The Devil Never Sleeps"	2:07
11.	"Peace Beneath the City"	4:45
12.	"Flightless Bird, American Mouth"	4:03
Total length:		49:45

== Personnel ==
The Shepherd's Dog was performed by:

- Sam Beam
- Sarah Beam
- Jim Becker
- Rob Burger
- Joey Burns
- Brian Deck
- EJ Holowicki
- John Kattke
- Matt Lux
- Patrick McKinney
- Paul Niehaus

== Bonus disc ==
1. "Arms of a Thief" - 3:41
2. "Serpent Charmer" - 2:40

== Charts ==
Chart (2007)	Peak position
Australian Albums (ARIA Charts)	98
Belgian Albums (Ultratop Flanders)	84
Belgian Alternative Albums (Ultratop Flanders)	43
Norwegian Albums (VG-lista)	24
UK Albums (OCC)	74
US Billboard 200	24
US Independent Albums (Billboard)	2
US Top Rock Albums (Billboard)	7

== Certifications ==
Region	Certification	Certified units/sales
United States (RIAA)	Gold	500,000^{‡}
^{‡} Sales+streaming figures based on certification alone.
