= Chloë Foy =

- Occupation: Singer-songwriter
- Years active: 2013–present
- Website: www.chloefoy.com

Chloë Foy is a British singer-songwriter originally from Gloucestershire.

== Where Shall We Begin ==
Foy released her debut album, Where Shall We Begin, in June 2021. The album entered the UK Folk Albums Chart at number 24.

Metacritic, which assigns a weighted average rating out of 100 to reviews from mainstream publications, gave Where Shall We Begin an average score of 79, based on five reviews. The Line of Best Fit described the album as "truly beautiful" and "a must listen".

Prior to the release of Where Shall We Begin, Foy released a number of singles and EPs, with her first release being in 2013.

Foy played as part of Jesca Hoop's band on the 2021 Record Store Day release, The Deconstruction Of Jack's House.

== Complete Fool ==
Foy's second album, Complete Fool, was released on the 6th of June 2025.

== Discography ==
Studio albums

- Where Shall We Begin (2021)
- Complete Fool (2025)

EPs

- In the Middle of the Night (2013)
- Are We There Yet (2017)
- Callous Copper (2020)
- Live from Abbey House (2020)
- Covers, Vol. 1 (2020)

Singles

- "Asylum" (2018)
- "In the Bleak Midwinter" (2018)
- "Fade into You" (2019)
- "Oh You Are Not Well" (2019)
- "Without You" (2019)
- "Never Be the Same Again" (2019)
- "A Little Respect" (2021)
- "Left-Centred Weight" (2021)
- "Shining Star" (2021)
- "Work of Art" (2021)
