= The Sea & the Rhythm =

EP by Iron & Wine
- Released: September 9, 2003
- Recorded: Sam's house in Miami, Florida
- Genre: Folk
- Length: 21:19
- Label: Sub Pop
- Producer: Sam Beam

Iron & Wine chronology
The Creek Drank the Cradle (2002)	The Sea & the Rhythm (2003)	Our Endless Numbered Days (2004)

Professional ratings
Review scores
Source	Rating
Allmusic	4/5 stars
Pitchfork	(8.4/10)

The Sea and the Rhythm is the second EP from Iron & Wine (a.k.a. Sam Beam), released on September 9, 2003 by Sub Pop Records. The song "The Sea and the Rhythm" was featured in the final episode of the first season of The O.C.

== Track listing ==
All tracks are written by Sam Beam.

No.	Title	Length
1.	"Beneath the Balcony"	3:28
2.	"The Sea and the Rhythm"	5:22
3.	"The Night Descending"	3:12
4.	"Jesus the Mexican Boy"	4:54
5.	"Someday the Waves"	4:14
Total length:		21:19
