= Our Endless Numbered Days =

Studio album by Iron & Wine
- Released: March 23, 2004
- Recorded: Summer 2003, Engine Studios, Chicago, Illinois
- Genre: Indie Folk
- Length: 44:47
- Label: Sub Pop
- Producer: Brian Deck

Iron & Wine chronology
The Sea & The Rhythm (EP) (2003)	Our Endless Numbered Days (2004)	Woman King EP (2005)

Our Endless Numbered Days is the second studio album from Iron & Wine. Released on March 23, 2004 on Sub Pop, it was the first non-solo effort by Sam Beam under his Iron & Wine moniker. Limited edition copies of the vinyl LP came with a bonus 7" vinyl single. Limited edition copies of the CD came with a bonus CD single. On January 29, 2019, Sub Pop announced that a deluxe edition of the album commemorating its 15th anniversary would be released on March 22, 2019, featuring previously unreleased demos of eight of the tracks from the original album.

The album's title comes from the lyrics of the song "Passing Afternoon": "There are things that drift away like our endless, numbered days."

== Background ==
The album marked a change in Iron & Wine's sound, as it was his first produced in a professional studio. Beam's only previous album, The Creek Drank the Cradle, was recorded entirely on a four-track tape recorder at his home.

== Reception ==
Professional ratings
Aggregate scores
Source	Rating
Metacritic	84/100
Review scores
Source	Rating
AllMusic	4.5/5 stars
Alternative Press	4/5
Blender	3/5 stars
Entertainment Weekly	C+
Mojo	4/5 stars
NME	8/10
Pitchfork	8.6/10
Q	4/5 stars
Spin	A
Uncut	4/5 stars

Our Endless Numbered Days has received widespread critical acclaim since its release. At Metacritic, which assigns a normalized rating out of 100 to reviews from mainstream critics, the album received an average score of 84, based on 21 reviews, which indicates "universal acclaim".

== Track listing ==
All tracks are written by Sam Beam.

No.	Title	Length
1.	"On Your Wings"	3:53
2.	"Naked as We Came"	2:33
3.	"Cinder and Smoke"	5:44
4.	"Sunset Soon Forgotten"	3:20
5.	"Teeth in the Grass"	2:22
6.	"Love and Some Verses"	3:40
7.	"Radio War"	1:56
8.	"Each Coming Night"	3:28
9.	"Free Until They Cut Me Down"	4:35
10.	"Fever Dream"	4:16
11.	"Sodom, South Georgia"	4:59
12.	"Passing Afternoon"	4:01
Total length:		44:47

Japanese Version Bonus Tracks
No.	Title	Length
13.	"Belated Promise Ring"	3:45
14.	"Homeward, These Shoes"	1:34
Total length:		50:06

7" Vinyl Single
No.	Title	Length
1.	"No Moon"	4:15
2.	"Sinning Hands"	5:31
Total length:		9:46

Bonus CD
No.	Title	Length
1.	"Cinder and Smoke" (demo)	4:21
2.	"Swans and the Swimming"	3:24
3.	"Free Until They Cut Me Down" (demo)	3:25
4.	"Hickory"	4:35
Total length:		15:45

2019 Deluxe Edition Bonus Tracks
No.	Title	Length
1.	"Naked as We Came" (demo)
2.	"Cinder and Smoke" (demo)
3.	"Teeth in the Grass" (demo)
4.	"Love and Some Verses" (demo)
5.	"Free Until They Cut Me Down" (demo)
6.	"Fever Dream" (demo)
7.	"Sodom, South Georgia" (demo)
8.	"Passing Afternoon" (demo)

== Personnel ==
Musicians

- Sam Beam - vocals, guitars, slide guitars, banjo, mandolin
- Brian Deck - drums, percussion, keyboards
- EJ Holowicki - bass
- Patrick McKinney - electric guitar
- Jeff McGriff - percussion
- Jonathan Bradley - percussion
- Sarah Beam - harmony vocals

== Certifications ==
Region	Certification	Certified units/sales
United States (RIAA)	Gold	500,000^{‡}
^{‡} Sales+streaming figures based on certification alone.

== Appearances in popular media ==
"Passing Afternoon" was played at the end of "Wilson's Heart," the finale of the fourth season of House and the second series of After Life. "Naked as We Came," "Trapeze Swinger" (a song not in this album) and "Sunset Soon Forgotten" were featured in the 2004 dramedy In Good Company. "Each Coming Night" is featured in the 2010 film The Last Song, starring Miley Cyrus. "Naked As We Came" is featured at the end of the 4th episode of the 2nd season of The L Word, when Jenny has her hair cut by Shane. "Naked As We Came" is also featured in the 9th episode of the first season of Grey's Anatomy, when Cristina and Izzie plan a secret autopsy of a patient's sudden death. "Naked As We Came" is also featured in the 2003 documentary Tarnation, directed by Jonathan Caouette. Claire Fuller's 2015 debut novel, Our Endless Numbered Days, is named after the album.
