= Woman King =

Woman King (EP)

EP by Iron & Wine
- Released: February 22, 2005
- Recorded: August 2004
- Genre: Folk
- Length: 23:58
- Label: Sub Pop
- Producer: Brian Deck

Iron & Wine chronology
Our Endless Numbered Days (2004)	Woman King (EP) (2005)	In the Reins (EP) with Calexico (2005)

Professional ratings
Aggregate scores
Source	Rating
Metacritic	82/100
Review scores
Source	Rating
Allmusic	4.5/5 stars
Cokemachineglow	86%
Kludge	(6/10)
Pitchfork	(8.5/10)
PopMatters	(9/10)
Rolling Stone	3.5/5 stars

Woman King is the fourth EP from Iron & Wine (aka Samuel Beam), released on February 22, 2005, by Sub Pop Records.

Woman King expanded on the studio sounds that marked his previous LP, Our Endless Numbered Days, and also included electric guitars. Each track featured a spiritual female figure and had subtle Biblical undertones, although Beam has said in interviews that he is agnostic.

== Critical reception ==
Woman King was met with "universal acclaim" reviews from critics. At Metacritic, which assigns a weighted average rating out of 100 to reviews from mainstream publications, the release received an average score of 82, based on 22 reviews.

== Track listing ==
No.	Title	Length
1.	"Woman King"	4:20
2.	"Jezebel"	5:07
3.	"Gray Stables"	3:55
4.	"Freedom Hangs Like Heaven"	4:00
5.	"My Lady's House"	3:32
6.	"Evening on the Ground (Lilith's Song)"	4:04
Total length:		23:58

== Charts ==
Chart performance for Woman King
Chart (2005)	Peak position
UK Independent Albums (Official Charts)	42
