= In the Reins =

EP by Calexico and Iron & Wine
- Released: September 12, 2005
- Recorded: Wavelab Studio, Tucson, Arizona
- Genre: Folk rock, Tex-Mex
- Length: 27:41
- Label: Overcoat Recordings

Calexico chronology
Feast of Wire (2003)	In the Reins (2005)	Garden Ruin (2006)

Iron & Wine chronology
Woman King (EP) (2005)	In the Reins (EP) (2005)	The Shepherd's Dog (2007)

Professional ratings
Aggregate scores
Source	Rating
Metacritic	77/100
Review scores
Source	Rating
AllMusic	4/5 stars
Pitchfork	(8.5/10)

In the Reins is a joint EP by Calexico and Iron & Wine, released by Overcoat Recordings on September 13, 2005. Iron & Wine's Sam Beam wrote all of the songs, which were recorded by the two bands together at Wavelab Studio in Tucson, Arizona. The album peaked at number 135 on the Billboard 200. Both later collaborated on a cover of Bob Dylan's "Dark Eyes" for the I'm Not There soundtrack, while Calexico's Joey Burns was featured on Iron & Wine's third LP, The Shepherd's Dog.

== Track listing ==
No.	Title	Length
1.	"He Lays in the Reins"	3:43
2.	"Prison on Route 41"	4:10
3.	"A History of Lovers"	3:09
4.	"Red Dust"	3:31
5.	"Sixteen, Maybe Less"	4:49
6.	"Burn That Broken Bed"	5:06
7.	"Dead Man's Will"	3:13
Total length:		27:41

2006 Japanese Edition (w/ live bonus tracks)

No.	Title	Length
1.	"He Lays in the Reins"	3:44
2.	"Prison on Route 41"	4:11
3.	"History of Lovers"	3:10
4.	"Red Dust"	3:31
5.	"Sixteen Maybe Less"	4:49
6.	"Burn That Broken Bed"	5:06
7.	"Dead Man's Will"	3:14
8.	"He Lays in the Reins"	5:33
9.	"A History of Lovers (Live)"	3:43
10.	"Wild Horses (The Rolling Stones cover)"	6:28
11.	"Prison on Route 41 (Live)"	4:17
12.	"All Tomorrow's Parties (The Velvet Underground cover)"	4:56
13.	"Burn That Broken Bed (Live)"	6:47
Total length:		59:29

== Personnel ==
- Sam Beam
- Joey Burns
- John Convertino
- Salvador Duran
- Nick Luca
- Paul Niehaus
- Ryan Roscoe
- Craig Schumacher
- Jacob Valenzuela
- Martin Wenk
- Natalie Wyatts
- Volker Zander

=== Production ===
- Craig Schumacher – recording, mixing
- Nick Luca – engineering
- Chris Schultz – engineering
