= Iron & Wine =

American musician (born 1974)

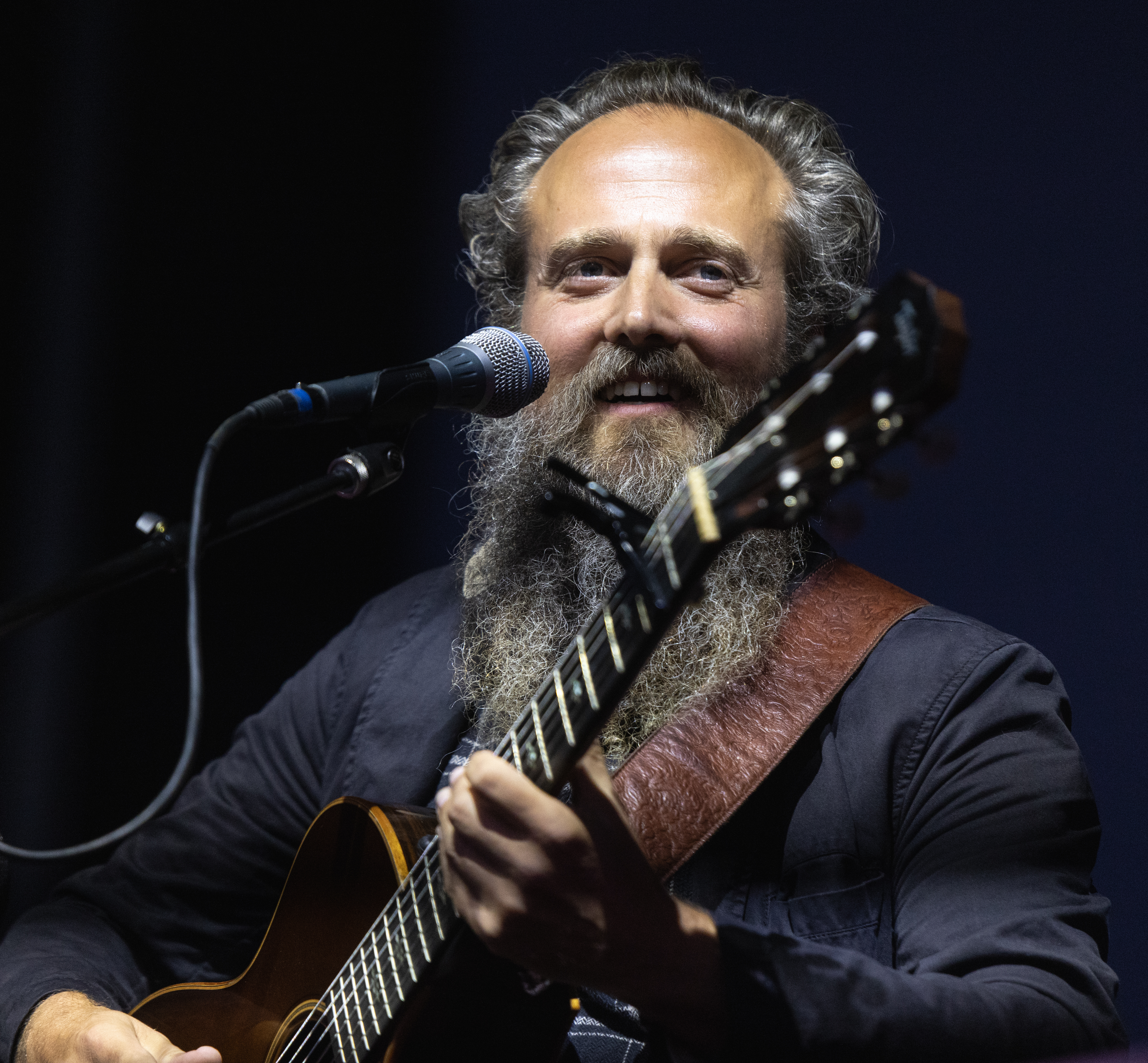
- Beam performing in 2022

Background information
- Born: Samuel Ervin Beam; July 26, 1974 (age 52); Chapin, South Carolina, U.S.
- Genres: Folk; folk rock; indie folk
- Instruments: Vocals; guitar; banjo; piano; percussion; harmonica; bass
- Labels: Sub Pop; Warner Bros.; 4AD; Nonesuch; Black Cricket Recording Co.
- Website: www.ironandwine.com

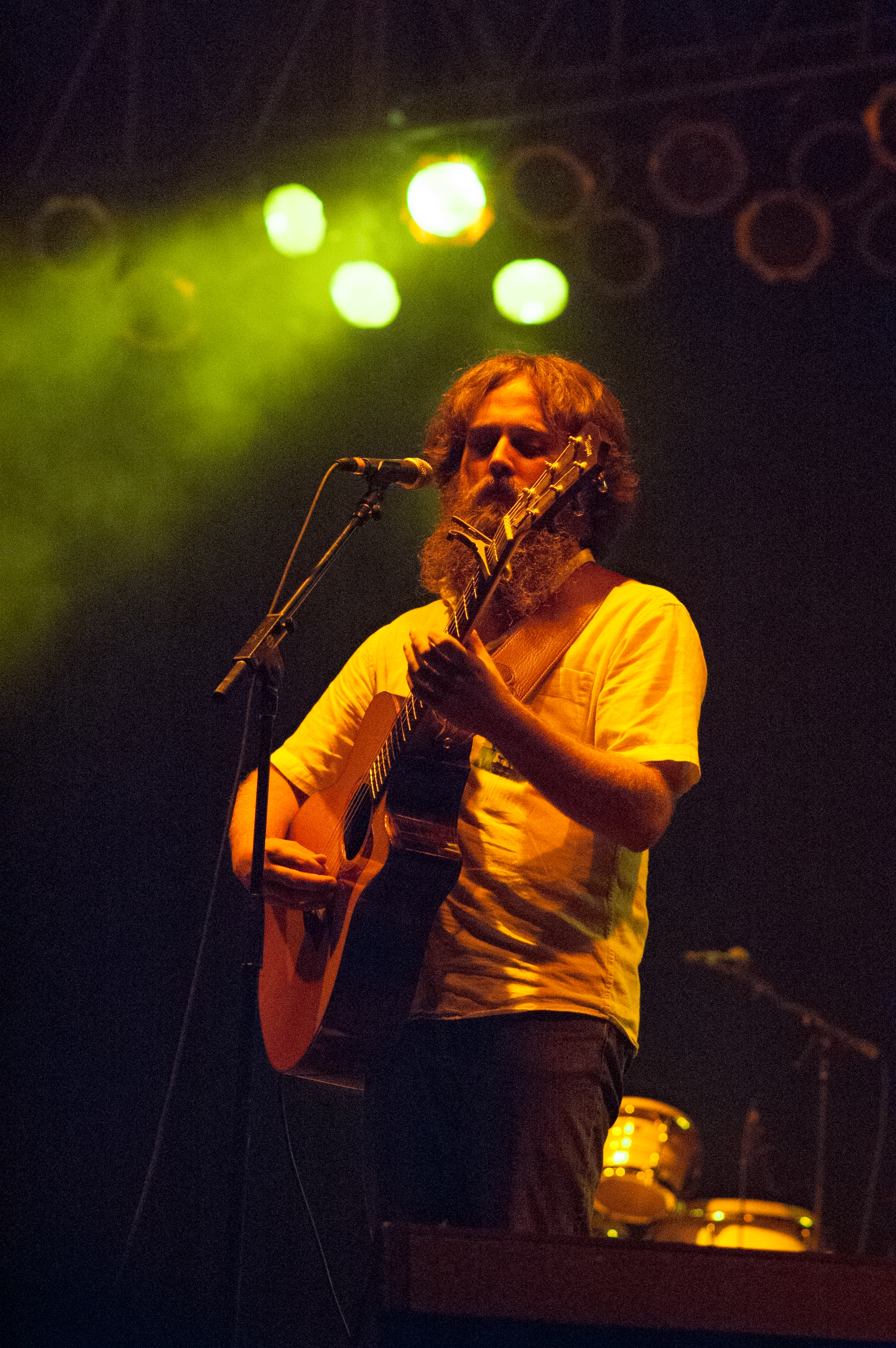
Iron & Wine at a 2006 concert at Brooklyn's McCarren Park Pool

Samuel Ervin Beam (born July 26, 1974), better known by his stage name Iron & Wine, is an American singer-songwriter. He has released eight studio albums, several EPs and singles, as well as a few download-only releases, which include a live album (a recording of his 2005 Bonnaroo performance). He occasionally tours with a full band.

The name Iron & Wine is taken from a dietary supplement named "Beef, Iron & Wine" that he found in a general store while shooting a film.

== Early life ==
Beam was raised in Chapin, South Carolina, where his father worked in land management and his mother was a schoolteacher. When he was a child, his family took regular trips to the country, where his grandfather ran a farm. He attended Seven Oaks Elementary School and Chapin High School. While home from college, he was a waiter at California Dreaming restaurant in Columbia. Beam earned a bachelor's degree in art from Virginia Commonwealth University in Richmond, Virginia. He specialized in painting before graduating from the Florida State University Film School with an MFA degree. Before the release of the first Iron & Wine album, Beam's main source of income was as a professor of film and cinematography at the University of Miami and Miami International University of Art & Design.

He had been writing songs for over seven years before a friend lent him a four-track recorder. One of Beam's home recordings came to the attention of Ben Bridwell, of Band of Horses, and eventually to Mike McGonigal, editor of Yeti magazine. McGonigal chose the song "Dead Man's Will", later released on In the Reins, for inclusion on one of his magazine's compilation CDs. Jonathan Poneman of Sub Pop records contacted Beam to propose a deal.

== Musical career ==
Beam released his first Iron & Wine album, The Creek Drank the Cradle, on the Sub Pop label in 2002. Beam wrote, performed, recorded and produced the album in his home studio. Featuring acoustic guitars, banjo, and slide guitar, the album's music has been compared to that of Nick Drake, Simon and Garfunkel, Elliott Smith, Neil Young and John Fahey.

Also in 2002, Beam recorded a cover of The Postal Service's then-unreleased song "Such Great Heights". Rather than being included on an Iron & Wine release, the track was initially included as a b-side of the original version by The Postal Service. It was later included on the B-sides and rarities album, Around the Well. He then followed up on his debut album in 2003 with The Sea & The Rhythm, an EP containing other home-recorded tracks with a similar style to the songs on the debut.

Beam's second full-length album, Our Endless Numbered Days (2004), was recorded in a professional studio with a significant increase in fidelity. Produced in Chicago by Brian Deck, the focus was still on acoustic material, but the inclusion of other band members gave rise to a slightly different sound. That same year, he recorded the song "The Trapeze Swinger" for the film In Good Company, and had his version of "Such Great Heights" featured in an advertisement for M&M's and in the film and soundtrack for Garden State. This version was later used in a 2006 Ask.com advertisement, and eventually released as a single in 2006 backed with recordings of "The Trapeze Swinger" and "Naked as We Came" made for Radio Vienna.

Sarah Beam, Samuel's sister, at the Beachland Ballroom in Cleveland

In February 2005, he released an EP entitled Woman King, which expanded on the sounds of his previous LP with the addition of electric guitars. Each track features a spiritual female figure, and had Biblical overtones.

The EP In the Reins, a collaboration with the Arizona-based rock band Calexico, was released in September 2005. Beam wrote all of the EP's songs years earlier, but Calexico added their trademark fusion of southwestern rock, traditional Mexican music and jazz to the songs' arrangements. Several tracks, most notably, "Burn That Broken Bed", feature brass instruments, a first for Beam's music.

The third full-length Iron & Wine album, entitled The Shepherd's Dog, was released September 25, 2007. This album was voted one of the ten best of 2007 by Paste magazine. Contributors included Joey Burns and Paul Niehaus of Calexico, as well as jazz musicians Matt Lux and Bob Burger. When asked to describe the album to The Independent, Beam remarked that "it's not a political propaganda record, but it's definitely inspired by political confusion, because I was really taken aback when Bush got reelected."

Beam has released most of his music on iTunes, including several exclusive EPs. The Iron & Wine iTunes Exclusive EP features unreleased studio recordings, including a Stereolab cover and two tracks which had previously only appeared on vinyl. The Live Session (iTunes Exclusive) features Beam and his sister, Sarah Beam, performing a number of tracks from his albums, as well as a cover of New Order's "Love Vigilantes". Sarah Beam has contributed backing vocals on many of Beam's studio recordings.

Beam's music has appeared in television series such as Grey's Anatomy, The L Word and House M.D. "Flightless Bird, American Mouth" was used in the film Twilight. The song was specifically chosen for the film's prom scene by Kristen Stewart, the female lead, and appears on the film's soundtrack.

The B-sides and rarities album Around the Well was released in 2009. Iron & Wine also contributed the song "Stolen Houses (Die)" to the AIDS benefit album Dark Was the Night produced by the Red Hot Organization.

On November 26, 2010, Iron & Wine released a special edition Record Store Day Black Friday 12" vinyl and CD single called, Walking Far From Home for independent record stores.

Kiss Each Other Clean, Iron & Wine's fourth full-length album, was released on January 25, 2011, on Warner Bros. Records in North America and 4AD for the rest of the world. With this album, Beam blended his earlier styles with a stronger pop influence.

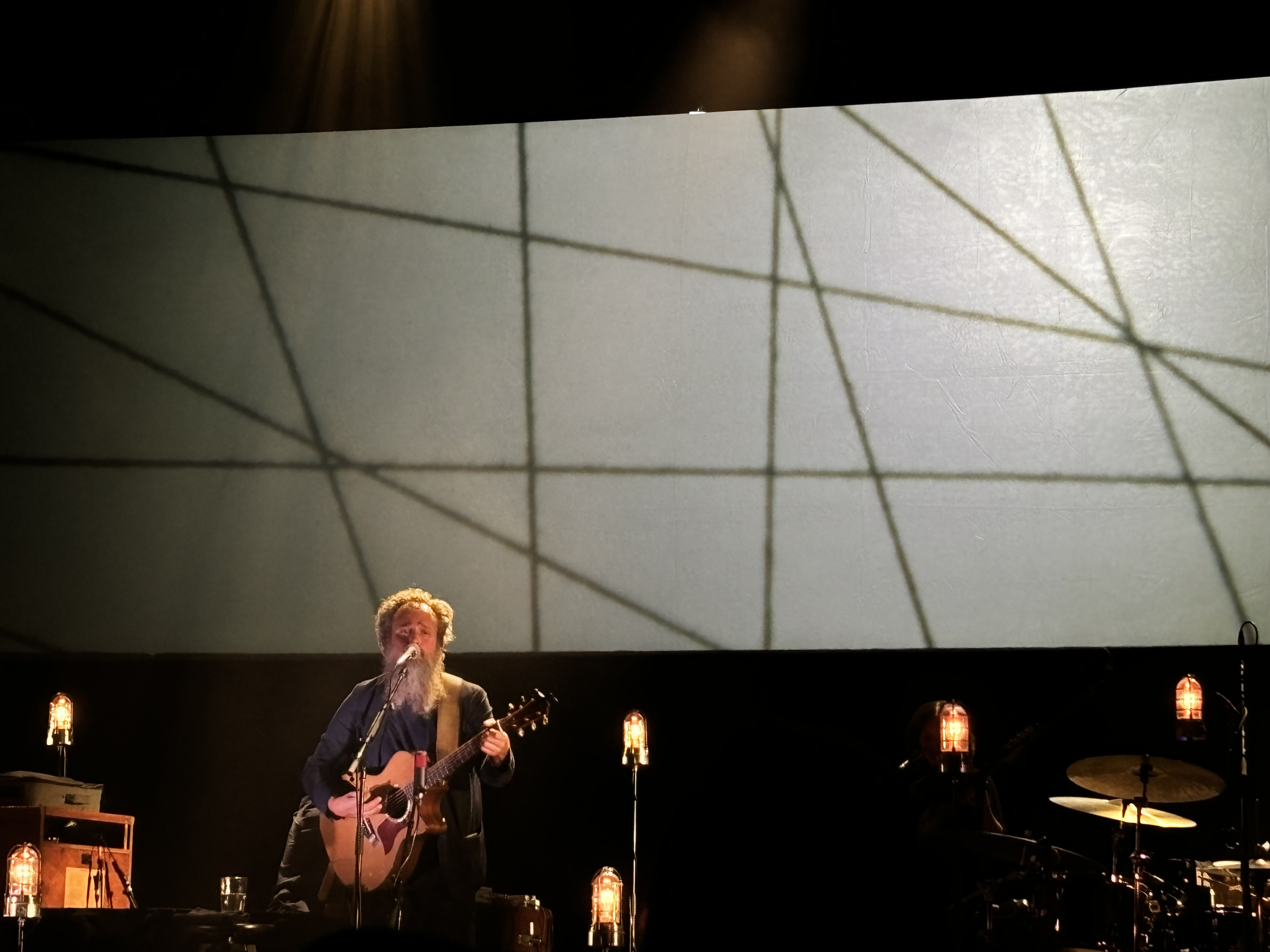
Beam in concert in Atlanta on August 5, 2024

Ghost on Ghost, Iron & Wine's fifth studio album, was released in April 2013 on Nonesuch Records in North America and 4AD for the rest of the world. Ghost on Ghost marked a further exploration into the pop sounds of Kiss Each Other Clean while also exhibiting jazz and R&B influences, with jazz drummer Brian Blade contributing to the album. In January 2014, recording during the polar vortex in Chicago, Beam and his regular collaborator Brian Deck co-produced eight of the ten songs on Chadwick Stokes' 2015 album The Horse Comanche. Beam contributed the Iron & Wine band to the sessions and sang backing vocals.

Iron & Wine released two albums in 2015. Archive Series: Volume 1, released in February, featured unreleased songs recorded during the same period as The Creek Drank the Cradle. A covers album, Sing Into My Mouth, recorded with Band of Horses singer Ben Bridwell, was released in July. Love Letter for Fire, an album of duets with American singer-songwriter Jesca Hoop, was released in 2016 on Sub Pop. Produced, recorded, and mixed by Tucker Martine, the album also featured contributions from Wilco's Glenn Kotche, Rob Burger, Eyvind Kang, Sebastian Steinberg, and Edward Rankin-Parker.

In August 2017, Iron & Wine's sixth studio album Beast Epic was released through Sub Pop Records. The record saw Beam strip back the production and array of instruments from previous records to return to more simple and melodic song structures.

On March 21, 2019, Calexico and Iron & Wine announced Years to Burn, their first collaboration album. It was released on June 14, 2019, via Sub Pop.

Live at Third Man Records was released in 2019, after being recorded on August 31, 2017.

In 2024, Iron & Wine released their seventh studio album, Light Verse and a cover of American Football's Never Meant.

== Personal life ==
Beam, his wife Kim, and their five daughters live in Durham, North Carolina. He was raised in the Bible belt as a Christian, but is now an agnostic: "That was a confusing time for me, but I don't miss being misled. I'm not an atheist. There's an undeniable unseen world that some people call God and think they know more about than other people. I try not to get hung up on the names."

== Discography ==
=== Albums ===
==== Studio albums ====
List of studio albums, with selected chart positions, sales figures and certifications
Title	Details	Peak chart positions										Sales	Certifications
Title	Details	US	AUS	BEL (FL)	CAN	IRE	NLD	NOR	SCO	SWE	UK	Sales	Certifications
The Creek Drank the Cradle	Released: September 24, 2002; Label: Sub Pop; Formats: cassette, CD, LP	—	—	—	—	—	—	—	—	—	—		
Our Endless Numbered Days	Released: March 23, 2004; Label: Sub Pop; Formats: CD, LP	158	—	—	—	—	—	—	—	—	— (Note: Our Endless Numbered Days did not enter the UK Albums Chart, but peaked at number 28 on the UK Vinyl Albums Chart.)	US: 200,000	RIAA: Gold
The Shepherd's Dog	Released: September 25, 2007; Label: Sub Pop; Formats: CD, digital download, LP	24	98	84	—	75	—	24	92	—	74	US: 197,000	RIAA: Gold
Kiss Each Other Clean	Released: January 25, 2011; Label: 4AD, Warner; Formats: CD, digital download, LP	2	36	43	15	14	54	10	28	24	32	US: 125,000	
Ghost on Ghost	Released: April 16, 2013; Label: 4AD, Nonesuch; Formats: CD, digital download, LP	26	—	61	—	31	88	32	34	43	40	US: 51,000	
Beast Epic	Released: August 25, 2017; Label: Black Cricket, Sub Pop; Formats: CD, digital download, LP	44	83	58	77	95	93	—	30	—	60		
Light Verse	Released: April 26, 2024; Label: Sub Pop; Formats: CD, digital download, LP	— (Note: Light Verse did not enter the Billboard 200, but peaked at number 30 on the US Top Album Sales chart.)	—	—	—	—	—	—	49	—	— (Note: Light Verse did not enter the UK Albums Chart, but peaked at number 42 on the UK Album Sales Chart.)		
Hen's Teeth	Released: February 27, 2026; Label: Sub Pop; Formats: CD, digital download, LP	— (Note: Hen’s Teeth did not enter the Billboard 200, but peaked at number 44 on the US Top Album Sales chart.)	—	—	—	—	—	—	87	—	— (Note: Hen’s Teeth did not enter the UK Albums Chart, but peaked at number 63 on the UK Album Sales Chart.)		
"—" denotes a release that did not chart or was not released in that territory

==== Collaborative albums ====
List of collaborative albums, with selected chart positions
Title	Details	Peak chart positions									
Title	Details	US	AUT	BEL (FL)	BEL (WA)	GER	IRE	NLD	SCO	SWI	UK
Sing into My Mouth (with Ben Bridwell)	Released: July 17, 2015; Label: Brown, Black Cricket; Formats: CD, digital download, LP	116	—	111	158	—	83	67	—	—	191
Love Letter for Fire (with Jesca Hoop)	Released: April 15, 2016; Label: Sub Pop; Formats: CD, digital download, LP	173	—	—	—	—	—	—	91	—	163
Years to Burn (with Calexico)	Released: June 14, 2019; Label: Sub Pop; Formats: CD, digital download, LP	— (Note: Years to Burn did not enter the Billboard 200, but peaked at number 51 on the US Top Album Sales chart.)	13	38	—	16	—	55	38	46	— (Note: Years to Burn did not enter the UK Albums Chart, but peaked at number 42 on the UK Album Sales Chart.)
"—" denotes a release that did not chart or was not released in that territory

==== Live albums ====
Title	Details
Iron & Wine Live Bonnaroo	Released: June 11, 2005; Label: Axis Festival; Formats: CD, digital download
Norfolk 6/20/05	Released: April 18, 2009; Label: Sub Pop; Formats: LP
Morning Becomes Eclectic	Released: December 5, 2011; Label: Black Cricket; Formats: CD, LP
Live at Third Man Records	Released: July 26, 2019; Label: Third Man; Formats: LP, digital download

==== Soundtrack albums ====
Title	Details	Peak chart positions	
Title	Details	UK Amer.	UK OST
Who Can See Forever Soundtrack	Released: November 7, 2023; Label: Sub Pop; Formats: CD, digital download, LP	25	15

==== Compilation albums ====
List of collaborative albums, with selected chart positions
Title	Details	Peak chart positions					
Title	Details	US	US Folk	US Indie	US Rock	UK	UK Amer.
Around the Well	Released: May 19, 2009; Label: Sub Pop; Formats: CD, digital download, LP	25	—	3	9	154	11
Archive Series Volume No. 1	Released: February 24, 2015; Label: Black Cricket; Formats: CD, digital download, LP	—	10	26	38	—	—
Archive Series Volume No. 4	Released: October 11, 2017; Label: Black Cricket; Formats: digital download, LP	—	—	—	—	—	—
Archive Series Volume No. 5	Released: May 7, 2021; Label: Black Cricket, Sub Pop; Formats: CD, digital download, LP	—	—	—	—	— (Note: Archive Series Volume No. 5 did not enter the UK Albums Chart, but peaked at number 30 on the UK Record Store Chart.)	14
Archive Series Volume No. 6	Released: June 13, 2024; Label: Black Cricket; Formats: LP	—	—	—	—	—	—
"—" denotes a release that did not chart or was not released in that territory

=== EPs ===
List of EPs, with selected chart positions
Title	Details	Peak chart positions						
Title	Details	US	US Folk	US Indie	SCO	UK Sales	UK Amer.	UK Indie
Iron & Wine Tour EP	Released: 2002; Label: Patchwork Music; Formats: CD	—	—	—	—	—	—	—
The Sea & The Rhythm	Released: September 9, 2003; Label: Sub Pop; Formats: CD, vinyl, digital download	—	—	37	—	—	—	—
Iron & Wine iTunes Exclusive EP	Released: June 22, 2004; Label: Sub Pop; Formats: digital download	—	—	—	—	—	—	—
Woman King	Released: February 22, 2005; Label: Sub Pop; Formats: CD, vinyl, digital download	128	—	13	—	—	—	42
In the Reins (with Calexico)	Released: September 12, 2005; Label: Overcoat; Formats: CD, vinyl, digital download	135	—	12	—	—	—	21
Live Session (iTunes Exclusive)	Released: February 7, 2006; Label: Sub Pop; Formats: digital download	—	—	—	—	—	—	—
Live at Lollapalooza 2006	Released: September 12, 2006; Label: self-released; Formats: digital download	—	—	—	—	—	—	—
Weed Garden	Released: August 31, 2018; Label: Sub Pop; Formats: CD, vinyl, digital download	— (Note: Weed Garden did not enter the Billboard 200, but peaked at number 53 on the US Top Album Sales chart.)	19	13	81	86	2	30
Lori	Released: September 16, 2022; Label: Black Cricket; Formats: CD, vinyl, digital download; Note: Covers of Lori McKenna songs	—	—	—	—	—	—	—
Making Good Time (with Ben Bridwell)	Released: September 12, 2025; Label: Brown, Black Cricket; Formats: CD, vinyl, digital download	—	—	—	—	—	—	—
"—" denotes a release that did not chart or was not released in that territory

=== Singles ===
Title	Year	Peak chart positions						Certifications	Album
Title	Year	US AAA	US Rock	BEL (FL) Tip	SCO	UK Phys.	UK Indie	Certifications	Album
"Call Your Boys" / "Dearest Forsaken"	2002	—	—	—	—	—	—		Non-album single
"Such Great Heights"	2003	—	—	—	82	87	17	RIAA: Gold	"Such Great Heights" single
"No Moon" / "Sinning Hands"	2004	—	—	—	—	—	—		Non-album single
"Passing Afternoon"	2004	—	—	—	—	—	—		Our Endless Numbered Days
"The Trapeze Swinger"	2005	—	—	—	—	—	—		Non-album singles
"Arms of a Thief" / "Serpent Charmer"	2007	—	—	—	—	—	—		Non-album singles
"Boy with a Coin"	2007	—	—	—	54	71	—	RIAA: Gold	The Shepherd's Dog
"Dark Eyes" (with Calexico)	2007	—	—	—	—	—	—		Non-album single
"Lovesong of the Buzzard"	2008	—	—	—	—	—	—		The Shepherd's Dog
"Flightless Bird, American Mouth"	2008	—	— (Note: "Flightless Bird, American Mouth" did not enter the Hot Rock & Alternative Songs chart, but peaked at number 23 on the Rock Digital Song Sales chart.)	—	—	—	19	RIAA: Platinum; BPI: Silver	The Shepherd's Dog
"Love Vigilantes"	2009	—	—	—	—	—	—		Non-album single
"Walking Far from Home"	2010	—	—	—	—	32	—		Kiss Each Other Clean
"Me and Lazarus"	2011	—	—	—	—	—	—		Kiss Each Other Clean
"Tree by the River"	2011	12	—	—	—	—	—		Kiss Each Other Clean
"One More Try" / "Trouble"	2012	—	—	—	—	72	—		Non-album single
"Lovers' Revolution"	2013	—	—	—	—	—	—		Ghost on Ghost
"Grace for Saints and Ramblers"	2013	—	—	—	—	19	—		Ghost on Ghost
"Forever Young" (with Rhiannon Giddens)	2015	—	32	—	—	—	—		Non-album single
"Albuquerque" / "It's The Same Old Song"	2015	—	—	—	—	24	—		Archive Series Volume No. 2
"Time After Time"	2016	—	—	—	—	—	—		Non-album single
"Stranger Lay Beside Me " / "Miss Bottom Of The Hill"	2017	—	—	—	—	86	—		Archive Series Volume No. 3
"Call It Dreaming"	2017	—	—	— (Note: "Call It Dreaming" did not enter the Flanders Ultratop 50, but charted as an "extra tip" on the Ultratip chart.)	—	—	—	RIAA: Gold	Beast Epic
"Bitter Truth"	2017	—	—	—	—	—	—		Beast Epic
"Song in Stone"	2017	—	—	—	—	—	—		Beast Epic
"Father Mountain" (with Calexico)	2019	35	—	45	—	—	—		Years to Burn
"Like Patsy Would"	2022	—	—	—	—	38	—		Lori
"You Never Know"	2024	—	—	—	—	—	—		Light Verse
"All in Good Time"	2024	25	—	—	—	—	—		Light Verse
"Never Meant"	2024	—	—	—	—	—	—		American Football (Covers)
"In Your Ocean"	2026	12	—	—	—	—	—		Hen's Teeth
"Grace Notes"	2026	—	—	—	—	—	—		Hen's Teeth
"—" denotes a recording that did not chart or was not released in that territory.

=== Other certified songs ===
Title	Year	Certifications	Album
"Naked as We Came"	2004	RIAA: Gold	Our Endless Numbered Days

=== Music videos ===
- "Southern Anthem" (2002)
- "Lion's Mane" (2002)
- "Boy with a Coin" (2007)
- "Joy" (2013)
- "Call It Dreaming" (2017)
- "Thomas County Law" (2017)
- "Bitter Truth" (2018)
- "Last Night" (2018)

=== Other contributions ===
- The Six Parts Seven's Lost Notes from Forgotten Songs (2003) – "Sleeping Diagonally"
- The O.C. Soundtrack (2004) – "The Sea & the Rhythm"
- Garden State Soundtrack (2004) – "Such Great Heights"
- Sweetheart: Love Songs (2004) – "Ab's Song" (The Marshall Tucker Band cover)
- L Word: Season Two Soundtrack (2004) – "Naked as We Came"
- Grey's Anatomy: Season Two Soundtrack (2004) – "Naked as We Came"
- In Good Company (2004) – "Naked as We Came", "Sunset Soon Forgotten", "The Trapeze Swinger"
- Fighting in a Sack (2004) – "New Slang (Featuring Iron & Wine) [Live]"
- KCRW Sounds Eclectic Volume 3 (2005) – "Waitin' for a Superman" (Flaming Lips cover)
- I Am a Cold Rock. I Am Dull Grass. (2006) – "We All, Us Three, Will Ride"
- I'm Not There Soundtrack (2007) – "Dark Eyes" (with Calexico)
- The Road Mix Volume 3, music from One Tree Hill (2007) – "He Lays in the Reins" (with Calexico)
- Acoustic 07 (2007) – "Naked as We Came"
- Numb3rs Season 3, Episode 19, "Pandora's Box" (2007) – "Naked as We Came"
- Friday Night Lights Season 1, Episode 12 (2007) – "Upward Over the Mountain"
- Friday Night Lights: Original Television Soundtrack (2007) – "Dead Man's Will" (with Calexico)
- Twilight Soundtrack (2008) – "Flightless Bird, American Mouth"
- 90210 Season 1, Episode 18, "Off the Rails" (2008) – "Cinder & Smoke"
- House M.D.
  - Season 4, Episode 16 (Season Finale, Part 2) "Wilson's Heart" (2008) – "Passing Afternoon"
  - Season 6, Episode 1 (Season Premiere, Part 1) "Broken" (2009) – "Love Vigilantes" (New Order cover)
- Dark Was the Night (2009) – "Stolen Houses (Die)"
- Ugly Betty Season 3, Episode 16 (2009) – "Naked as We Came"
- The Mysteries of Pittsburgh (2009) – "Naked as We Came"
- Misfits Season 1, Episode 6 (2009) – "Such Great Heights"
- TiMER (2009) – "The Trapeze Swinger"
- The Last Song Soundtrack (2010) – "Each Coming Night"
- Degrassi Season 10, Episode 31, "Halo, Part 2" (2010) – "Passing Afternoon"
- Twilight Saga: Breaking Dawn – Part 1 Soundtrack (2011) – "Flightless Bird, American Mouth (wedding version)"
- The Lone Ranger: Wanted (Music Inspired by the Film) (2013) – "Rattling Bone"
- The Resident Season 5, Episode 5 (2021) – "Naked as We Came"
