= The Creek Drank the Cradle =

Studio album by Iron & Wine
- Released: September 24, 2002
- Genre: Folk; lo-fi
- Length: 39:26
- Label: Sub Pop
- Producer: Iron & Wine

Iron & Wine chronology
The Creek Drank the Cradle (2002)	The Sea & The Rhythm (2003)

The Creek Drank the Cradle is the debut studio album by the American singer-songwriter Sam Beam, better known by his stage name Iron & Wine. The album was released through Sub Pop on September 24, 2002. The vinyl LP release had a bonus 7" vinyl single. The promotional CD for this album was released in a cardboard sleeve with different artwork.

== Background ==
The sparse lo-fi sound of the album is attributed to Beam recording the tracks at home on a four-track recorder, initially as demos. His intention was to pass these on to Joey Burns and John Convertino of the band Calexico who provided a rhythm section on the finished piece. However, the demos were released instead.

== Reception ==
Professional ratings
Aggregate scores
Source	Rating
Metacritic	87/100
Review scores
Source	Rating
AllMusic	4.5/5 stars
The Austin Chronicle	4/5 stars
Drowned in Sound	8/10
Mojo	4/5 stars
Pitchfork	8.1/10
Q	3/5 stars
Stylus Magazine	B+
Tiny Mix Tapes	4.5/5
Uncut	4/5 stars

The Creek Drank the Cradle has received widespread critical acclaim since its release. At Metacritic, which assigns a normalized rating out of 100 to reviews from mainstream critics, the album received an average score of 87, based on 14 reviews, which indicates "universal acclaim".

Pitchfork placed The Creek Drank the Cradle at number 137 on its list of the top 200 albums of the 2000s. Tim Sendra of AllMusic called it "a stunning debut and one of the best records of 2002".

== Track listing ==
All tracks are written by Sam Beam.

No.	Title	Length
1.	"Lion's Mane"	2:49
2.	"Bird Stealing Bread"	4:21
3.	"Faded from the Winter"	3:17
4.	"Promising Light"	2:49
5.	"The Rooster Moans"	3:24
6.	"Upward Over the Mountain"	5:56
7.	"Southern Anthem"	3:54
8.	"An Angry Blade"	3:48
9.	"Weary Memory"	4:01
10.	"Promise What You Will"	2:24
11.	"Muddy Hymnal"	2:43
Total length:		39:26

7" Vinyl Single
No.	Title	Length
1.	"Her Tea Leaves"	3:50
2.	"Carissa's Wierd [sic]"	2:07
Total length:		5:57
