= Nebraska (soundtrack) =

Nebraska (Music from the Motion Picture)

Film score by Mark Orton
- Released: November 19, 2013
- Recorded: 2013
- Genre: Film score
- Length: 44:55
- Label: Milan
- Producer: Mark Orton

Mark Orton chronology
| Dryland (2013) | Nebraska (2013) | The Chair of Happiness (2013) |

Nebraska (Music from the Motion Picture) is the soundtrack to the 2013 film Nebraska directed by Alexander Payne. The film's musical score is composed by Mark Orton and released through Milan Records on November 19, 2013. The score consisted of acoustic instrumentation deviating from the Western and country music tropes. It also featured contributions from the music of Tin Hat band being used as temp music and eventually mixed into the film. The score received positive reviews from critics.

== Development ==
Mark Orton, frontman of the Tin Hat band, had scored music for Nebraska, collaborating with Payne for the first time after he usually worked with Rolfe Kent for all of his films excluding The Descendants (2011). Orton sent most of the band's compositions to the music editor Richard Ford to edit them as temp tracks for the film. According to Orton, 27 out of the 28 cues from the temp music material were his compositions while the one track belonged to another Tin Band member Rob Burger. He fine-tuned and mixed most of the materials before the film was sent to the Cannes Film Festival. After the premiere, he was brought on board as a composer for the film. This resulted in the score being a conglomeration of licensed and original music. Two of Orton's compositions for Sweet Land (2005) eventually used as the main themes for the film.

For composing the score, Orton refrained with the practice of utilizing session players, which he did previously, and also from using country and Western music as per Payne's suggestion who wanted an organic and handmade score; he instead derived the musical landscape on "imagining a kind of Italian cinema on the plains" which resulted in the prominent use of accordion. Some of the other instruments used in the score were strummed piano, celesta, harp, toy piano, reed organ, strings, accordion, stroh violin and trumpet. Most of the themes have composed were used in sequences without dialogues and mostly "song-like".

== Reception ==
Rich Osweiler, in his review for Premier Guitar, assigned four-stars out of five and wrote "Orton's haunting guitar-driven tunes that are sprinkled with dobro, violin, accordion, and other antique instruments have a gorgeously melancholy nature about them." Mark F. Turner of All About Jazz gave 4.5 stars (out of 5), stating "Evocative, humorous, and at times downright touching, the music gives depth to Nebraska's complexities and humanness." Timothy Monger of AllMusic wrote "At times haunting and quirky, his sparse, percussive, acoustic guitar and fiddle score is a perfect match for the film both in tone and geography." Connor McInerney of Mxdwn Music wrote "The soundtrack deserves merit for the talent the members of Tin Hat trio put into their performances, as well as respect for the band’s innovative use of chamber music outside of a classical context."

Matt Goldberg of Collider wrote "Mark Orton’s score follows suit by using subtle instrumentation consisting of guitars, a violin, a piano, and an occasional trumpet, but then, when necessary, can build to something surprisingly stirring." Eric Kohn of IndieWire wrote "Mark Orton’s rich score elaborates on the elegant world until it grows redundant". Scott Foundas of Variety wrote "the plaintive guitar-and-fiddle score by Mark Orton is another craft standout." Todd McCarthy of The Hollywood Reporter wrote "Mark Orton’s lovely score, which often employs just a guitar in combination with an array of individual second instruments, provides a constant source of pleasure". David Edelstein of Vulture wrote "composer Mark Orton’s stoic, minor-key banjo and strings give them a dignity that turns an easy sight gag into something more mysterious." Joe Morgenstern of The Wall Street Journal and Dana Stevens of Slate described the score as "exquisite" and "wistful".

== Track listing ==
Nebraska (Music from the Motion Picture) track listing
| No. | Title | Length |
|---|---|---|
| 1. | "Their Pie" | 2:06 |
| 2. | "New West" | 3:49 |
| 3. | "Herbert's Story" | 1:59 |
| 4. | "Gossip/Brownie's Pie" | 2:00 |
| 5. | "To the Levee" | 2:12 |
| 6. | "Magna Carta" | 2:30 |
| 7. | "Bill" | 4:25 |
| 8. | "Diminished Capacity" | 2:50 |
| 9. | "The Old Compressor/Escape" | 2:37 |
| 10. | "The Ambush" | 2:30 |
| 11. | "Seaone" | 2:23 |
| 12. | "Night of the Skeptic" | 3:21 |
| 13. | "Guitar TWenty Eight" | 1:22 |
| 14. | "Immigration" | 2:23 |
| 15. | "Magna Carta" | 2:38 |
| 16. | "The Old House" | 2:17 |
| 17. | "Their Pie" | 0:34 |
| 18. | "Green Green Grass of Home" | 2:59 |
| Total length: | | 44:55 |

== Accolades ==
Accolades for Nebraska (Music from the Motion Picture)
| Award | Date of ceremony | Category | Recipients | Result |
|---|---|---|---|---|
| Alliance of Women Film Journalists | December 19, 2013 | Best Music or Score | Mark Orton | Nominated |
