= The Holdovers (soundtrack) =

The Holdovers (Original Motion Picture Soundtrack)

Soundtrack album by Mark Orton
- Released: November 10, 2023 (digital); November 17, 2023 (physical)
- Genre: Pop; classical; Christmas music
- Length: 76:48
- Label: Back Lot Music
- Producer: Mark Orton

Mark Orton chronology
The Last Shift (2020)	The Holdovers (2023)

The Holdovers (Original Motion Picture Soundtrack) is the soundtrack to the 2023 film of the same name directed by Alexander Payne. Featuring musical score composed by Mark Orton, the soundtrack featured 24 tracks—seven of them being from Orton's score and the remainder being songs from prominent artists Damien Jurado, Labi Siffre, Andy Williams and bands and vocal groups such as The Chambers Brothers, Shocking Blue, The Allman Brothers Band, Artie Shaw and His Orchestra, The Swingles, The Temptations, Tony Orlando and Dawn amongst several others. The soundtrack was released digitally by Back Lot Music on November 10, 2023, coinciding with the film's nationwide release, and physically the following week.

== Background ==
Mark Orton of the group Tin Hat composed the film's score; he previously worked with Payne on Nebraska (2013). Payne visited Orton at his studio in Portland, Oregon and discussed the film's music and the setting of the 1970s, which led them to research several instruments and types of equipment during the time period and avoided modern instruments for the music and sound design. For instance, Payne wanted the sound design to be equivalent to the mono audio format as heard in the 1970s instead of the Dolby Atmos sound technology, and certain instruments invented during that time, such as the Wurlitzer electronic piano, Gibson Les Paul guitar, Fender Telecaster, Fender amplifier, MIDI, Neve 8078 and consoles from Telefunken, etc. These instruments were intended to mimic the era sonically, while in addition, Orton had also used pump organs, cimbaloms and bells for the sonic texture.

During their discussion, Orton had penned down a suite of songs going more particular on the film's aesthetics, where one-third of which were included in the film. They noted down several films that influenced the music and songs from Carole King's studio album Tapestry or from the Hal Ashby-directed film Harold and Maude (both 1971). On incorporating the comedic feel, Orton felt that the score never leads the emotions, comedy or drama but instead supports the character's intentions. Moreover, the Christmas and the holiday side comes in the early stages of the movie, before the plot and the characters "get kind of whittled down to the three main ones" from where the score is being played broader in terms of a comedic approach. Orton used sleigh bells from various times, as well as chamber music and sounds created by using triangles, block bells and metallic percussions to bring the feel of "Christmas music". The opening scene which features a choir rehearsal was performed by actual boys choir from London.

Matt Aberle was the music supervisor and Richard Ford was the music editor, whom in collaboration with Orton had selected some of the pop music based on the 1970s. The film then shifts into a road drama, that influences the score providing tension and seriousness in those moments. The track "Into the Unknown" is a re-iteration of the first cue Orton had composed, which was sparser and slightly acoustic. It is one of the main themes of the film where "it comes at small moments of redemption, or slight bits of resolve" according to Orton.

== Track listing ==
No.	Title	Artist(s)	Length
1.	"Silver Joy"	Damien Jurado	3:06
2.	"Venus"	Shocking Blue	3:07
3.	" The Time Has Come Today"	The Chambers Brothers	4:54
4.	"Candlepin Bowling"	Mark Orton	2:17
5.	"Primal Architecture"	Orton	0:47
6.	"Crying Laughing Loving Lying"	Labi Siffre	3:01
7.	"In Memory of Elizabeth Reed"	The Allman Brothers Band	6:58
8.	"Knock Three Times"	Tony Orlando and Dawn	2:59
9.	"When Winter Comes"	Artie Shaw and His Orchestra	2:54
10.	"Drive to Boston"	Orton	2:16
11.	"Nursing Home"	Orton	1:52
12.	"Medley: Deck the Hall with Boughs of Holly / What Child Is This?"	The Swingle Singers	3:11
13.	"Silent Night"	The Temptations	6:07
14.	"Jingle Bells"	Herb Alpert's Tijuana Brass	3:11
15.	"It's Christmas!"	Orton	2:13
16.	"Carol of the Drum (Little Drummer Boy)"	The Trapp Family Singers	2:01
17.	"White Christmas"	The Swingle Singers	2:11
18.	"The Most Wonderful Time of the Year"	Andy Williams	2:33
19.	"The Wind"	Cat Stevens	1:42
20.	"A Calf Born in Winter"	Khruangbin	3:31
21.	"The Glove / Now He's History / 5/4 for Constantine"	Orton	4:24
22.	"A Girl in Tow / Back to Barton"	Orton	4:34
23.	"Danny / The Glove / Let's Make the Best of It"	Orton	2:20
24.	"See Ya / Into the Unknown"	Orton	4:39
Total length:			76:48

== Reception ==
Pete Hammond of Deadline Hollywood called the score "wonderful", further adding that it "sets the tone with a Fred Karlin-ish vibe". Jericho Tadeo of MovieWeb called it "an impeccable score from Mark Orton that brings a modern vibe to 70s sounds". Barry Levitt of /Film wrote: "Mark Orton's score is lovely and never cloying, assisting emotional beats without being overbearing. And the soundtrack perfectly evokes the era." Brian Truitt of USA Today and Mauren Lee Lenker of Entertainment Weekly also opined the same. Leah Greenblatt of Esquire called it a "shaggy, toodling soundtrack with several sneaky anachronisms", while David Sims of The Atlantic described it as "strumming acoustic".

In December 2023, the score was shortlisted for Best Original Score at the 96th Academy Awards.

== Release history ==
Release dates and formats for The Holdovers (Original Motion Picture Soundtrack)
Region	Date	Format(s)	Label	Ref.
Various	August 11, 2023	Digital download; streaming	Back Lot Music	
Various	November 17, 2023	CD	Back Lot Music	
Various	November 17, 2023	Vinyl	Back Lot Music	
