= Rob Burger =

American composer (born 1971)

Robert Burger (born March 26, 1971) is an American composer, arranger, multi-instrumentalist, and music director.

== Biography ==
Burger began playing piano at an early age, starting his formal training at age six with the pianist Jeffrey Marcus. He played in local and school bands during his youth, and then went on to study classical performance at the University of Massachusetts with pianist Nigel Cox, as well as African American Studies and improvisation under the direction of Yusef Lateef. In 1994, he was recruited as accordionist, to the Bill Frisell Band, featuring Joey Baron, Kermit Driscoll, and Don Byron. Burger moved to San Francisco in 1995 and formed the Tin Hat Trio. With them, he co-wrote and co-produced four critically acclaimed recordings for various major labels. The group's recordings Helium and The Rodeo Eroded each feature guest vocal performances by Tom Waits and Willie Nelson. In 2001, Burger moved back to New York where he worked closely with composer John Zorn, contributing as a featured soloist to many of his scores and recordings. He has released two full-length solo recordings on the Tzadik label, Lost Photograph (2002) and City of Strangers (2009). His third album entitled The Grid (2019) was released on Western Vinyl.

== Film work ==
Burger has scored and contributed as a soloist to a number of feature and documentary films including Everything is Illuminated, directed by Liev Schreiber; Diminished Capacity, directed by Terry Kinney; 360, directed by Fernando Meirelles; The Treatment, directed by Oren Rudavsky; The Good Girl, directed by Miguel Arteta; East Of Acadia; Bully, directed by Lee Hirsch; The Disappearance of McKinley Nolan, directed by Henry Corra; Chelsea on the Rocks, directed by Abel Ferrara; and the Oscar nominated film Nebraska, directed by Alexander Payne.

A versatile composer and player, Rob has also served as a "do-it-all, one-stop shop" for commercials and multi-media projects seeking original music. He has worked with clients such as Apple, Toyota, The Guggenheim, PBS, Wall Street Journal, and Mercedes-Benz.

His work is permanently featured in the Museum of the City of New York.

In 2017, Burger scored the film Trouble, directed by Theresa Rebeck, and starring Anjelica Huston, Bill Pullman, and David Morse.

== Music direction and session work ==
Burger has teamed up with other musicians for much larger scale productions. Beginning in 2003, Burger became an active arranger and music director for various live performances produced by Hal Willner, that celebrated the artistry of Leonard Cohen, Bill Withers, Doc Pomus, among others.

In 2008, he performed the music of Bernard Herrmann as a featured soloist with the Chicago Symphony Orchestra. He has shared the stage with, and has contributed to the recordings of many acclaimed artists including Elvis Costello, David Hidalgo, Marianne Faithfull, Sting, Rufus Wainwright, Nick Cave, Antony & the Johnsons, Lucinda Williams, Tracy Chapman, Iron & Wine, Beth Orton, and Laurie Anderson. He has collaborated in the studio with musicians Jim Keltner, Brian Blade, Marc Ribot, Greg Cohen, and Bill Laswell.

In 2011, after several years of working with Sam Beam of Iron & Wine, Burger was asked to produce the song “Flightless Bird, American Mouth” for the soundtrack of Twilight Breaking Dawn – Part 1. He then went on to arrange and provide music direction for the band's fifth release Ghost On Ghost, and a world tour that followed.

In 2014, he was invited to perform in Hal Willner's project Sleeping in the Devil's Bed: The Music of Daniel Lanois, as part of Toronto's Luminato Festival. Daniel Lanois was present and featured, along with Emmylou Harris.

In 2017, Burger was reunited with Iron & Wine to record their sixth album, Beast Epic. The recordings took place in Chicago at the band Wilco's studio, The Loft. Burger worked with composer Daniel Pemberton on the score for the film "Ocean's 8" in 2018, as well as contributed to several albums by various artists, including Rosanne Cash's acclaimed release She Remembers Everything. In the summer of 2019, Burger released his first solo album in nearly a decade, entitled The Grid on Western Vinyl. The album features a vocal performance by Laurie Anderson.

== Discography ==
=== As leader ===
- Lost Photograph (Tzadik, 2002)
- City of Strangers (Tzadik, 2009)
- The Grid (Western Vinyl, 2019)
- Marching with Feathers (Western Vinyl, 2022)

With Tin Hat Trio

- Helium (2000)
- Memory Is an Elephant (1999)
- The Rodeo Eroded (2002)
- Book of Silk (2004)

=== As sideman ===
With Iron & Wine

- The Shepherd's Dog (2007)
- Around the Well (2009)
- Kiss Each Other Clean (2011)
- Ghost on Ghost (2013)
- Beast Epic (2017)
- Weed Garden (2018)

With John Zorn

- Alhambra Love Songs (2009)
- Goddess Music for the Ancient Days (2010)
- In Search of the Miraculous (2010)
- Nosferatu (2012)

With others

- Marc Almond, Stardom Road (2007)
- Laurie Anderson, Homeland (2010)
- Susana Baca, Eco De Sombras (2000)
- Lullaby Baxter, Lullaby Baxter (2000)
- Sam Beam & Jesca Hoop, Love Letter for Fire (2016)
- Will Bernard, Medicine Hat (1998)
- Richard Buckner, Meadow (2006)
- Calexico, Garden Ruin (2006)
- Calexico/Iron & Wine, Years to Burn (2019)
- Jim Campilongo, Table for One (1998)
- Laura Cantrell, Humming by the Flowered Vine (2005)
- case/lang/veirs, case/lang/veirs (2016)
- Rosanne Cash, She Rembembers Everything (2018)
- Tracy Chapman, Our Bright Future (2008)
- Christina Courtin, Christina Courtin (2009)
- Christina Courtin, Varsity (2013)
- Mike Coykendall, Chasing Away the Dots (2012)
- Madison Cunningham, Revealer (2022)
- Alela Diane, Cusp (2018)
- Marianne Dissard, L'entredeux (2008)
- Marianne Faithfull, Easy Come, Easy Go (2008)
- Jesse Harris, Cosmo (2010)
- Norah Jones, Come Away with Me (2002)
- Norah Jones, Feels Like Home (2004)
- Tift Merritt, Traveling Alone (2012)
- Anaïs Mitchell, Young Man in America (2012)
- Mix Master Mike, Anti Theft Device (1998)
- Matt Nathanson, Ernst (1997)
- Aoife O'Donovan, Fossils (2013)
- Oranj Symphonette, the Oranj Album (1998)
- Beth Orton, Comfort of Strangers (2006)
- Beth Orton, Sugaring Season (2012)
- Sly and Robbie, Survive (2012)
- Linda Thompson, Versatile Heart (2007)
- Linda Thompson, Won't Be Long Now (2013)
- Tipsy, Trip Tease (1997)
- Tipsy, Uh Oh (2001)
- Laura Veirs, Tumble Bee (2011)
- Laura Veirs, Warp and Weft (2013)
- Bob Weir, Blue Mountain (2016)
- Lucinda Williams, West (2007)
- Lucinda Williams, Little Honey (2008)
- Rufus Wainwright, Want Two (2004)
- Rufus Wainwright, Release the Stars (2007)

=== Soundtracks ===
==== As composer of score ====
- Chelsea On The Rocks (2008)
- Diminished Capacity (2008)
- The Disappearance of McKinley Nolan (2010)
- Frank The Bastard (2013)
- Trouble (2017)
- Prophecy No.15 (2021)
- Because We're Family (2022)

==== As composer of featured works ====
- 360 (2011)
- Bully (2011)
- Nebraska (2013)

==== As featured soloist ====
- The Good Girl (2002)
- Invitation to a Suicide (2002)
- Everything is Illuminated (2005)
- Leonard Cohen: I'm Your Man (2005)
- The Treatment (2006)
- Waitress (2007)
- American Loser (2007)
- The Rain Horse (2008)
- El General (2009)
- Still Bill (2009)
- Today's Special (2009)
- Paper Man (2009)
- The Nobel Prizewinner (2010)
- Sholem Aleichem: Laughing in the Darkness (2011)
- The Swell Season (2011)
- Twilight Breaking Dawn – Part 1 (2011)
- Greetings From Tim Buckley (2012)
- Beyond the Infinite (2013)
- Ocean's 8 (2018)

(Discography and soundtrack credits collected from AllMusic) and Rob Burger's official website
