= Somewhere in Queens =

2022 film by Ray Romano

- Theatrical release poster
- Directed by: Ray Romano
- Written by: Ray Romano; Mark Stegemann
- Produced by: Albert Berger; Ron Yerxa; Ray Romano; Mark Stegemann
- Starring: Ray Romano; Laurie Metcalf; Jacob Ward; Sadie Stanley; Jennifer Esposito; Dierdre Friel; Jon Manfrellotti; Sebastian Maniscalco; Tony Lo Bianco
- Cinematography: Maceo Bishop
- Edited by: Robert Nassau
- Music by: Mark Orton
- Production companies: Papa Al Productions; Bona Fide Productions
- Distributed by: Lionsgate; Roadside Attractions
- Release dates: June 10, 2022 (Tribeca); April 21, 2023 (United States)
- Running time: 106 minutes
- Country: United States
- Language: English
- Box office: $1.8 million

Somewhere in Queens is a 2022 American comedy drama directed by Ray Romano, in his directorial debut, from a screenplay by Romano and Mark Stegemann. The film stars Romano, Laurie Metcalf, Jacob Ward, Sadie Stanley, Jennifer Esposito, Dierdre Friel, Jon Manfrellotti, Sebastian Maniscalco, and Tony Lo Bianco in his final film role.

It premiered at the Tribeca Film Festival on June 10, 2022, and was released in the United States on April 21, 2023, by Lionsgate and Roadside Attractions.

== Plot ==
Husband and wife Leo and Angela Russo live a simple life in Queens, New York with their 18-year-old son Matthew (Sticks) and surrounded by Leo's overbearing Italian-American family. Leo and Angela were high school sweethearts, but their current relationship is somewhat dull due to Leo's mild personality and Angela's PTSD after undergoing breast cancer treatment five years ago, for which she refuses to attend group therapy recommended by her doctor. Sticks is reserved and introverted, but is a great basketball player on his high school team and spends time practicing with Leo, who enjoys quoting Rocky for inspiration. Leo works for his family-owned construction firm, Russo's Construction, led by his traditional-minded father (Pops). Leo does not find Pops to be very affectionate towards him nor Sticks. The Russo's trailer office is currently set up in the neighborhood of Pamela Carmelo, a beautiful widowed woman who tries to flirt with Leo.

One evening Leo and Angela attend the last game in Sticks' high school preliminary basketball tournament and are amazed to see his performance. Leo in particular relishes the experience after the crowd shows him approval and appreciation. Although he barely loses the match, Sticks' skills are impressive enough to catch the attention of a college talent scout, who offers to arrange an interview at a small college with the potential for a scholarship offer to play on their team, which Leo quickly accepts. The Russo's are also introduced to Sticks' first girlfriend, Dani. Dani attends a nearby high school and works as a waitress to save up for a car so she can drive cross-country after graduation. Angela takes an instant dislike to Dani, but still invites her to the Russo's traditional Sunday family gathering meal. At the gathering, Leo brings up the prospect of Sticks' going to college, which Pops dismisses in favor of having Sticks join the family construction business after graduating high school. However Dani openly challenges Pops and is able to persuade him to consider the matter from a business prospective.

The Russo's visit Drexel University for Sticks' basketball interview, and Leo feels optimistic upon hearing his son has a good shot at the scholarship offer. Celebrations are cut short upon returning home however when Sticks announces Dani has broken up with him because of her discomfort with how deeply he has fallen for her within a short span of time. Leo is unable to properly console his son, and Sticks' heartbreak worsens. Afraid of how Sticks' emotions will negatively affect his tryout performance, Leo convinces Dani to pretend to take Sticks back until the tryouts are over, which Dani reluctantly agrees to do. Eventually Angela catches Dani at the mall with her real boyfriend and assumes she is cheating, but Leo convinces Angela not to tell Sticks about it. It is revealed that Angela feels protective of Sticks because she is paranoid about cancer remission and potentially losing out on spending time with her son, despite the fact that all of her test results consistently come back as negative. Soon after, Sticks has a successful tryout and secures a full-ride scholarship to attend Drexel and be on their basketball team.

At a Russo family celebration, Dani approaches Leo and announces her intention to break up with Sticks since the tryouts are over. Leo encourages her to continue the act a little longer, but Dani goes through with the break up after Sticks initiates sex with her. As she leaves Sticks, Dani accidentally tells him that Leo spoke with her after their initial breakup. Leo admits to his actions after Sticks confronts him in front of the Russo family, and the family berates Leo. Leo argues and insults all of them in frustration and almost outs Angela's cancer-related insecurities in front of everyone, for which Angela slaps him with cake to end the argument. Depressed, Leo ends up at Pamela's house, who tries to initiate sex with him, but Leo refuses, realizing how important his family is to him and that he reacted selfishly. He returns home to apologize to Sticks and Angela, and admits he acted selfishly to live out his personal hopes through Sticks' future. Sticks admits he has no desire to attend Drexel and does not care about the basketball scholarship, a decision his parents accept. Leo also makes amends with the rest of his family, and Pops shows that he does care about both Leo and Sticks. Meanwhile, Sticks also peacefully comes to terms about his breakup with Dani and recovers from his heartbreak. Four months later, the Russo family is back to normal. Leo is on good terms with everyone, and Angela is attending group therapy for her cancer PTSD. Sticks is attending Queensborough Community College, has a new girlfriend, and is involved in the college spoken word poetry organization. In the last scene, he invites his parents to his first poetry recital, ending it with a quote from Rocky, for which Leo proudly gives him a standing ovation.

== Cast ==
- Ray Romano as Leo Russo
- Laurie Metcalf as Angela Russo
- Jacob Ward as Matthew "Sticks" Russo
- Sadie Stanley as Danielle "Dani" Brooks
- Tony Lo Bianco as Dominic "Pops" Russo
- Sebastian Maniscalco as Frank Russo
- Jennifer Esposito as Pamela Carmelo
- Jon Manfrellotti as Petey
- Dierdre Friel as Rosa Russo
- Katie Kreisler as Connie
- Jennifer Simard as Patsy
- Danny Garcia as Sal
- Erik Griffin as DJ Joey Bones
- Franco Maicas as Luigi
- Adam Kaplan as Marco
- Dario Vazquez as Emory
- June Gable as Mama Russo
- P.J. Byrne as Ben Pearson
- Geoffrey Owens as Scottie
- J. C. MacKenzie as Mr. Mack
- Jackson Pace as Dani's mall date
- Frank Santorelli as Phil

== Production ==
In February 2021, it was reported that Ray Romano would direct and star in an untitled film alongside Laurie Metcalf from a screenplay he wrote with Mark Stegemann. In May 2021, Sebastian Maniscalco, Jacob Ward, Sadie Stanley, Jennifer Esposito, Dierdre Friel, Jon Manfrellotti, Danny Garcia, Erik Griffin, June Gable, Tony Lo Bianco, Adam Kaplan, Katie Kreisler, Franco Maicas, and Jennifer Simard joined the cast.

The film began principal photography on April 19, 2021, and concluded on May 14, 2021, in New York City. In June 2021, scenes were shot in White Plains, New York.

== Reception ==
On the review aggregator website Rotten Tomatoes, 92% of 60 critics' reviews are positive, with an average rating of 7.1/10. The website's consensus reads: "Somewhere in Queens finds director/co-writer/star Ray Romano squarely in his comfort zone, with thoroughly entertaining results." Metacritic, which uses a weighted average, assigned the film a score of 61 out of 100, based on 16 critics, indicating "generally favorable" reviews.
