= Sally McNeil =

American bodybuilder and convicted murderer

- Born: Sally Marie Dempsey; September 30, 1960 (age 66); Allentown, Pennsylvania, U.S.
- Other name: Killer Sally
- Occupations: Bodybuilder; U.S. Marine
- Spouses: Ray McNeil (1987–1995; his death); Norfleet Stewart (2022–2026; his death)
- Children: 3
- Status: Paroled in 2020
- Conviction: Second-degree murder
- Penalty: 19 years to life imprisonment
- Professional bodybuilder

Best statistics
- Height: 5 ft 3 in (160 cm)
- Weight: 133–140 lb (60–64 kg) (competition weight)

Professional (Pro) career
- Best win: U.S. Armed Services Physique Championship
- Pro years: 1987–1994
- Military career
- Branch: U.S. Marine Corps
- Service years: 1980s–1993
- Rank: Sergeant
- Unit: Camp Pendleton

Sally Marie McNeil (born September 30, 1960) is an American former sergeant, professional female bodybuilder, and muscle worship practitioner who was convicted of murdering her husband Ray McNeil, a Mr. Olympia competitor. McNeil was granted parole in 2020 and now lives a private life.

== Early life and education ==
McNeil was born Sally Dempsey in Allentown, Pennsylvania, on September 30, 1960. She describes her upbringing as tough, including exposure to such frequent violence that she thought it was commonplace in every home. Sally's father, Richard Dale Dempsey, was an alcoholic who frequently abused her mother.

McNeil attended Dieruff High School in Allentown, where she was on the school's swimming and diving and track and field teams. She enrolled at East Stroudsburg State College with aspirations of becoming a gym teacher. After three and a half years in college, however, she ran out of money to fund her education and dropped out.

== Career ==
=== Military career ===
Following the path of her brother and her uncle before her, McNeil joined the United States Marine Corps at Camp Pendleton. She rose to the rank of sergeant.

In 1990, McNeil was demoted from her position as a sergeant following a record of continuously poor behavior, including anger issues, violence, and lashing out at others. Her behavioral record prohibited her from reenlisting in 1993.

=== Body building and wrestling ===
McNeil started bodybuilding during her service at Camp Pendleton in 1987. In her first competition in February 1987, she placed fourth. She won the U.S. Armed Services Physique Championship twice in the late 1980s.

In 1990, McNeil relocated to Oceanside, California with her husband, Ray, and her two children. McNeil and Ray both aspired to become professional bodybuilders, but were unable to meet their expenses. McNeil began a career wrestling men on video for $300 an hour, earning her the moniker Killer Sally. She was trained by videomaker Bill Wick, husband of Kay Baxter. She also worked as a female submission wrestler and performed muscle worship sessions with men. While the acts were inherently sexual for the buyer, McNeil denies ever having sexual relations during them. She said she did not enjoy the work, but found that the income outweighed what she labeled a "dark side." She was making enough money to enable Ray to leave the Marines and concentrate on his own bodybuilding career.

== Personal life ==
McNeil met her first husband, Anthony Lowden, at Parris Island, while serving in the U.S. Marines. The two were married for four years and had two children: Shantina and John. McNeil described Lowden as abusive towards the end of their marriage.

While she was in the process of transferring to Camp Pendleton, McNeil filed for divorce from Lowden and was awarded custody of their two oldest children. The third child was put up for adoption.

=== Marriage to Ray McNeil ===
McNeil started bodybuilding in June 1987 during her service at Camp Pendleton, after a friend introduced her to Ray McNeil, a competitive bodybuilder. They dated for roughly two months before marrying. Three days after their marriage, McNeil alleges he began abusing her and her two children, claiming he choked and punched her.

The family settled in Oceanside, California. Ray began using steroids, which McNeil blamed for his violent behavior. McNeil traveled to Tijuana, Mexico, with her children to buy steroids for her own use and to sell at the gym. McNeil admitted she was not proud of this and considered this to be "bad parenting".

In 1991, Ray won the heavyweight and overall titles in the NPC California Championships, the IFBB, and North American Championships, and competed in the 1993 Mr. Olympia competition, where he placed 15th. He also began participating in professional wrestling and did stand-up comedy, performing his material at The Comedy Club in La Jolla, California.

According to his friend, Dwayne "DJ" Jeffers, Ray got into an altercation with another man one night while working as a bouncer at a nightclub and ended up gouching his fingers through his eyes. Shantina, McNeil's daughter, verified the incident, recalling seeing Ray arriving home covered in blood and telling her that he had to do what he did because others were trying to kill him.

Both Shantina and John claimed they witnessed Ray being abusive towards McNeil, and say they were also victims. Shantina claims to have seen him choke her mother and witnessed Ray breaking McNeil's nose in front of her, an incident she reported to her Marine superiors. Ray was detained and released shortly after. McNeil claims that he proceeded to beat her until she promised to drop the charges, which she eventually did. John stated that when McNeil was away, Ray would become abusive towards them. When they were in trouble, Ray would bring them into a room and spank them with a belt while making the other watch.

McNeil also claimed that Ray also sexually abused her throughout their marriage, forcing her to have sex despite her denials. Under oath, McNeil testified that she received numerous injuries, including five broken bones, over the course of their marriage. At one point, McNeil had fought back against Ray, angering him. McNeil stated that he had beaten her worse, breaking her rib and puncturing her lung.

Ray had an affair with another woman, Marianne Myers, and left McNeil for her. According to Jeffers, Ray planned to spend Valentine's Day in 1995 with the other woman, not his wife. Ray told Jeffers he told McNeil about ending their relationship, and Jeffers warned him about the shotgun in their house. Jeffers raised the possibility that Sally might shoot him, but Ray laughed it off.

== Murder of Ray McNeil ==
On February 14, 1995, emergency services in Oceanside, California, received a call from McNeil, who said: "I just shot my husband because he just beat me up."

Earlier that night, Ray was on a date with Marianne Myers, his mistress, unbeknownst to McNeil, as he had claimed he was going to get chicken for dinner. She was preparing to go out and find Ray, but he later arrived after 10:30pm. McNeil claimed and maintains that she shot Ray in self-defense when he, spurred by roid rage, began choking her after she accused him of adultery. The police transcript reads that Ray, "slapped her, pushed her down on the floor, and started choking her. McNeil squirmed away, ran into the bedroom, and took her sawed-off shotgun out of its case in the closet." McNeil then shot Ray twice: once in the abdomen and once in the jaw.

Both of McNeil's children were present in the apartment, but in their own room during the shooting. Shantina left the room after hearing the shots, saw Ray's state, and ran to a neighbor's apartment for help. Ray was still alive and conscious when police arrived. He was taken to Scripps Memorial Hospital, however he was declared dead two hours later. McNeil was arrested for murder.

At the time of her arrest, McNeil tested positive for the steroid Deca-Durabolin, while Ray's autopsy revealed he had five different kinds of steroids in his bloodstream.

Her bail was set at $100,000. Out of loyalty, this was paid for by McNeil's wrestling clients and others from the muscle worship community.

=== Trial and conviction ===
The defense argued that McNeil suffered from Battered Woman Syndrome after years of mental and physical abuse by Ray. The defense expert explained that due to her diagnosis, this would have caused McNeil to shoot in self-defense as she genuinely perceived herself to be in imminent danger. McNeil's daughter, Shantina, testified in her mother's defense. Shantina claimed that she could hear Ray choking her mother through the door and she had known those sounds because he had choked McNeil multiple times before.

Evidence arose during Sally's trial that questioned the validity of the story she had given, including her body language during the initial police interview, the trajectory of the rounds fired into Ray (one of which must have been fired while he was on the floor), and the blood spatter on their living room lamp. In addition, no DNA of Sally's was found on Ray, which eliminated any forensic evidence to back up her story. The prosecutors argued that, based on evidence, McNeil had shot Ray in the abdomen, left to the bedroom to reload the gun, and returned to the living room to shoot him in the face.

In 1996, she was convicted of second degree murder and sentenced to 19 years to life.

=== Imprisonment and appeals ===
After numerous appeals on a variety of grounds, including improper jury instructions, McNeil's conviction was initially overturned by the U.S. 9th Circuit Court of Appeals, which resulted in the granting of a writ of habeas corpus. The State of California then appealed the reversal to the U.S Supreme Court, which reversed the 9th Circuit's ruling and remanded the case back to the venue. On March 29, 2005, relying on information and instructions from the Supreme Court opinion, the 9th Circuit ruled in favor of the State and reinstated McNeil's conviction and sentence.

McNeil served her sentence at the Central California Women's Facility in Chowchilla, California.

=== Release ===
Her parole was granted by the California Department of Corrections and Rehabilitation on May 29, 2020.

== Other legal issues ==
McNeil was arrested in 1990, for brandishing a firearm at Lowden and smashing the windows of his vehicle with a metal bar. She had been arrested previously for assaulting a mailman who had slapped her son, John, after he had a fight with the mailman's son.

In 1990, McNeil attacked a woman she suspected was having an affair with Ray at a bodybuilding show, pinning her to the floor and hitting her repeatedly. This resulted in the National Physique Committee suspending her for a year.

In 1993, Sally was confronted by a club bouncer for dancing on the tables. Drunk and not wanting to do what he told her, Sally kicked him in the face three times. When police arrived, she threatened to kill them.

== Post-prison personal life ==
Following her release, McNeil married Norfleet Stewart, whom she met through her Veterans Transition Center support group. She currently resides in Northern California.

McNeil reconnected with Shantina and John following her release and met her grandchildren. Both attended her wedding. Shantina is a former army staff sergeant and has one son, Donnell. On March 4, 2024, reportedly homeless at the time and suffering from PTSD, John was fatally shot in Augusta, Georgia. He had three children.

Norfleet Stewart died on March 28, 2026 in Augusta, Georgia.

== Bodybuilding ==
Year	Body	Competition	Division	Placing
1988	NPC	US Armed Forces Championships	Middleweight	1st
1988	NPC	US Armed Forces Championships	Overall	1st
1991	NPC	Junior USA	Lightweight	5th
1991	NPC	Nationals	Middleweight	13th
1991	NPC	Palm Spring Classic	Middleweight	4th
1992	NPC	Junior USA	Middleweight	2nd
1992	NPC	Nationals	Middleweight	12th
1992	IFBB	North American Championships	Middleweight	9th
1992	NPC	USA Championships	Middleweight	5th
1994	NPC	Nationals	Heavyweight	16th
1994	IFBB	North American Championships	Heavyweight	6th
1994	NPC	USA Championships	Middleweight	5th

== In media ==
In October 2022, Netflix released a three-part docuseries, Killer Sally, covering the case and its aftermath. It was directed by Nanette Burstein, whose previous credits include On the Ropes (1999) and Hillary (2020).
