= Shut Up Anthony =

- Directed by: Kyle Eaton
- Written by: Kyle Eaton
- Produced by: David Allen Cress; Kyle Eaton; Matt O'Connor
- Starring: Robert A. D'Esposito; Jon Titterington; Katie Michels
- Cinematography: Philip A. Anderson; Bryce Fortner; Jason Roark; Madison Rowley
- Edited by: Michael Ward; Kyle Eaton
- Music by: Mark Orton
- Production company: Hunter Way Pictures
- Release date: 2 March 2017 (Cinequest Film Festival)
- Running time: 92 minutes
- Country: United States
- Language: English

Shut Up Anthony is a 2017 American comedy-drama film directed by Kyle Eaton, starring Robert A. D'Esposito, Jon Titterington and Katie Michels.

== Cast ==
- Robert A. D'Esposito as Anthony
- Jon Titterington as Tim
- Katie Michels as Sam

== Reception ==
Mike Acker of The Oregonian that the film "works for any number of reasons, but mostly it works because the emotions feel real."

Anthony Ray Bench of Film Threat gave the film a score of 6/10 and wrote that while the film has an "interesting" premise, it is "squandered by an unlikable main character and a slow pace."

Curtis Cook of Willamette Week wrote that "while the characters aren't always likable, their awkward misadventures are bound to get a chuckle."

Megan Burbank of Portland Mercury called the film "well-paced and beautifully shot" and wrote that it "holds together as quiet little portrait of despair".
