= Crossfire Hurricane =

Crossfire Hurricane, a phrase from the Rolling Stones song "Jumpin' Jack Flash", may refer to:

- Crossfire Hurricane (film), a 2012 documentary film about the Rolling Stones
- Crossfire Hurricane (FBI investigation), a code name for a counterintelligence investigation of links between Donald Trump's 2016 presidential campaign and Russia
