= Ron Yerxa =

American film producer (born 1947)

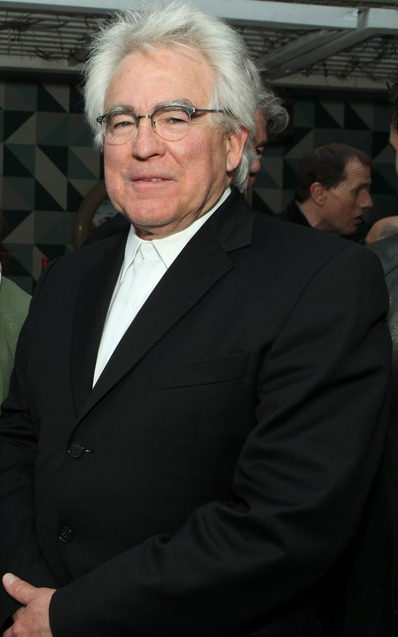
- Born: Ronald Paul Yerxa; May 18, 1947 (age 78); United States
- Occupation: Film producer
- Notable work: Nebraska

Ron Yerxa (born May 18, 1947) is an American film producer. He is known for the films Little Miss Sunshine, Somewhere in Queens, Hamlet 2 and Cold Mountain.

Yerxa and fellow producer Albert Berger founded the production company, Bona Fide Productions. Yerxa and Berger were nominated for an Academy Award for Best Picture for the 2013 film Nebraska.

Yerxa attended the University of California Santa Cruz and Stanford University.
