= Dierdre Friel =

American actress

- Occupation: Actress
- Years active: 2007–present
- Known for: Physical, New Amsterdam

Dierdre Friel is an American actress known for her work in television, film, and theater. She is best known for her series regular role as Greta Hauser in the Apple TV+ dark comedy series Physical (2021–2023) and her recurring role as Ella in the NBC medical drama New Amsterdam (2018–2022).

== Career ==
Friel began her professional career in New York theater, making an early television appearance on The Sopranos in 2007. She is known for portraying Ella, a barista with OCD, in the NBC series New Amsterdam, appearing in 20 episodes across four seasons.

In 2021, she was cast as a series regular in Physical, playing Greta Hauser, the best friend of the protagonist played by Rose Byrne. Her performance was noted for grounding the character's transformative arc throughout the series' three-season run.

Friel has promoted Physical in multiple media interviews, including a television segment on CBS News Los Angeles, where she discussed her role and the series ahead of its later seasons. She also appeared in a televised lifestyle interview on ABC4’s Daily Dish discussing the show and her character.

In 2022, she appeared in the Ray Romano-directed dramedy Somewhere in Queens as Rosa Russo.

== Theater ==
Friel is a classically trained stage actress with numerous credits on and off Broadway. She made her Broadway debut in 2012 in the musical Leap of Faith at the St. James Theatre, portraying the role of Amanda Wayne.

In 2018, she appeared in the Signature Theatre's revival of Stephen Adly Guirgis's Our Lady of 121st Street, directed by Phylicia Rashad, where her performance as Sonia was described by critics as a "profoundly miscellaneous woman" whose presence added to the play's darkly comic ensemble. Her other Off-Broadway credits include the world premiere of the musical Dogfight at Second Stage Theater (2012), directed by Joe Mantello, where she was noted for her "quick turn" as Ruth Two-Bears. She also appeared in the Manhattan Theatre Club production of Golden Age (2012).

== Filmography ==
=== Television ===
Year	Title	Role	Notes
2007	The Sopranos	Waitress	Episode: "Kennedy and Heidi"
2018–2022	New Amsterdam	Ella	Recurring role (20 episodes)
2021–2023	Physical	Greta Hauser	Main role (29 episodes)
2024	The Good Doctor	Lucy's Mom	1 episode

=== Film ===
Year	Title	Role	Notes
2008	Pretty Bird	Customer	
2018	Second Act	Big Ant	
2022	Somewhere in Queens	Rosa Russo	
