= Nanette Burstein =

American film and television director

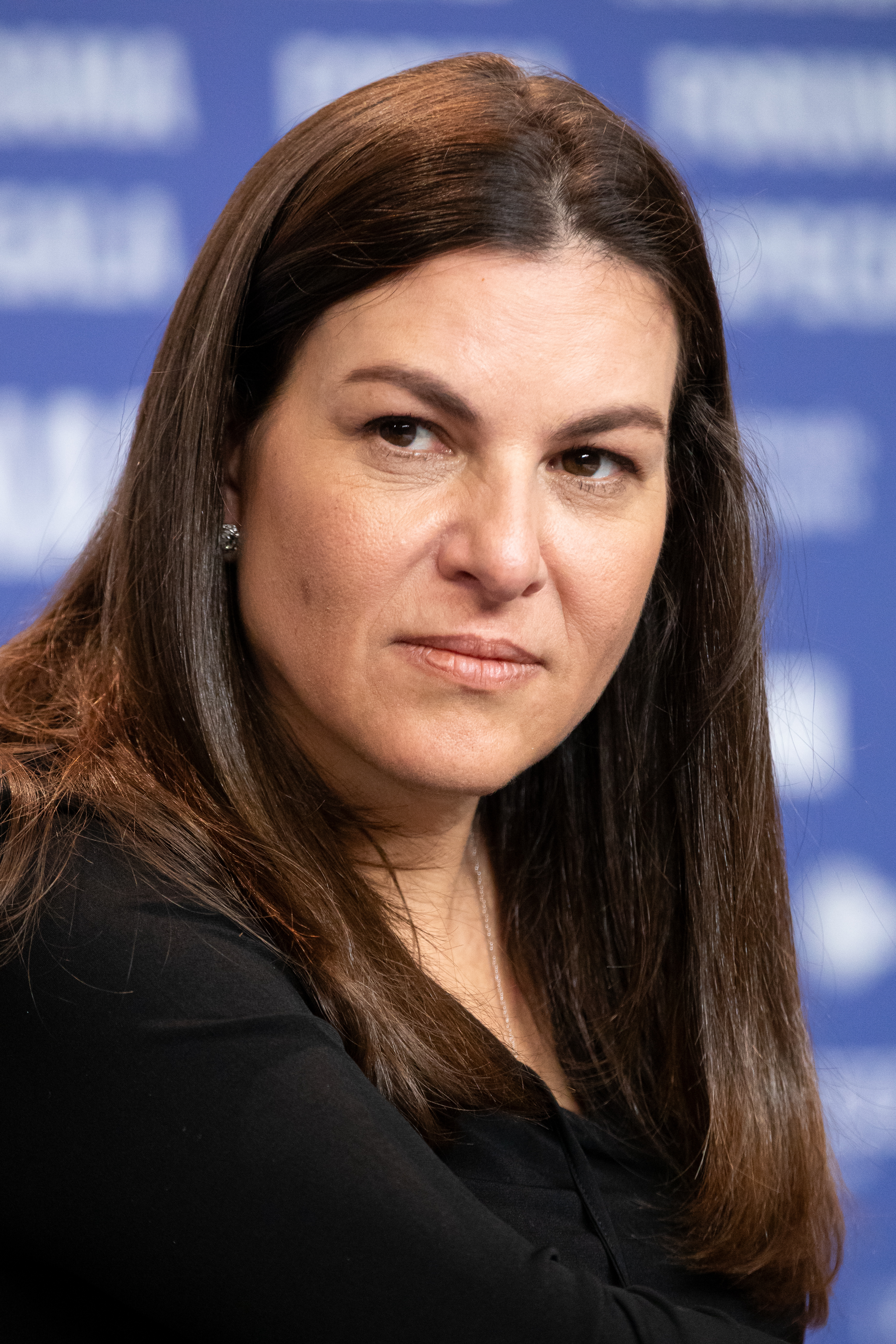
- Nanette Burstein, 2020
- Born: 1970 or 1971; Buffalo, New York, U.S.
- Education: Tisch School of the Arts
- Occupations: Director, producer, screenwriter
- Years active: 1997–present
- Children: 1

Nanette Burstein is an American film and television director. Burstein has produced, directed, and co-directed several documentaries including the Academy Award nominated and Sundance Special Jury Prize winning film On the Ropes.

== Life and career ==
Burstein studied film at NYU's Tisch School of the Arts.

In 1997 she collaborated on her first film with Brett Morgen, producing and directing On the Ropes, a low-budget documentary that follows the fates of three young boxers and their trainer. The film, shot mainly on BetaSP, was nominated for an Oscar for Best Documentary Feature, won Special Jury Prize for Documentary at Sundance, won the Directors Guild of America's award for Outstanding Directorial Achievement in Documentary. The film also won the International Documentary Association's Feature Documentary award, a Silver Spire at the San Francisco International Film Festival, the Urbanworld Film Festival Best Documentary, and the Land Grant Award at the Taos Talking Pictures Film Festival. The film was also nominated for an Independent Spirit Award.

In 1998, she and Nancy Tong co-wrote the script for Tong's matter-of-fact documentary In the Name of the Emperor of the massacre of over 300,000 Chinese civilians by the Japanese in the Rape of Nanjing in 1937.

In 2002, she and Morgen teamed up again for the Robert Evans biography The Kid Stays in the Picture. The film received positive reviews and ratings from many critics, (Note: Roger Ebert rated the film 3.5 of 4 stars. Ron Wells of Film Threat rated it 5 out of 5 stars. Entertainment Weekly graded it an A. The Seattle Post-Intelligencer graded it an A minus. The Charlotte Observer rated it 3.5 out of 4 stars.) and won the International Press Academy and Boston Society of Film Critics award for Best Documentary. It was also nominated for Best Documentary by the Chicago, Online, Phoenix and Broadcast Film Critics.

In 2004, she produced a documentary television show Film School for IFC with Jordan Roberts, following four film students at their alma mater, Tisch. In 2007, Burstein was executive producer and writer on the VH1 rock documentary series NY77: The Coolest Year in Hell which showcases the rise of hip hop, punk, disco, and graffiti in New York City in 1977. She also executive produced the documentary American Shopper.

Her documentary American Teen was nominated for the Grand Jury Prize for Documentary at the 2008 Sundance Film Festival. For the project, she lived in the small town of Warsaw, Indiana for ten months, filming daily. She ended up with 1000 hours of footage, which took a year to edit.

== Personal life ==
Nanette is the mother of one daughter. She lives in New York and co-owned a Manhattan bar, The Half-King, with Scott Anderson, and Sebastian Junger.

== Filmography ==
Nanette Burstein's films and television series
Year	Title	Notes	Ref.
1999	On the Ropes	Documentary	
2001	Say It Loud: A Celebration of Black Music in America	TV mini-series	
2002	The Kid Stays in the Picture	Documentary	
2004	Film School	TV series	
2005	Autobiography	TV series	
2007	American Shopper	Film	
2007	NY77: The Coolest Year in Hell	TV series, producer only	
2008	American Teen	Documentary	
2010	Going the Distance	Film	
2012	New Girl	TV series	
2012	Don't Trust the B— in Apartment 23	TV series	
2014	The Price of Gold		
2016	Gringo: The Dangerous Life of John McAfee	Documentary	
2020	Hillary	Documentary	
2022	Killer Sally	Documentary series	
2024	Elizabeth Taylor: The Lost Tapes	Documentary	
