= Rob Reich (musician) =

American musical artist (1978–2025)

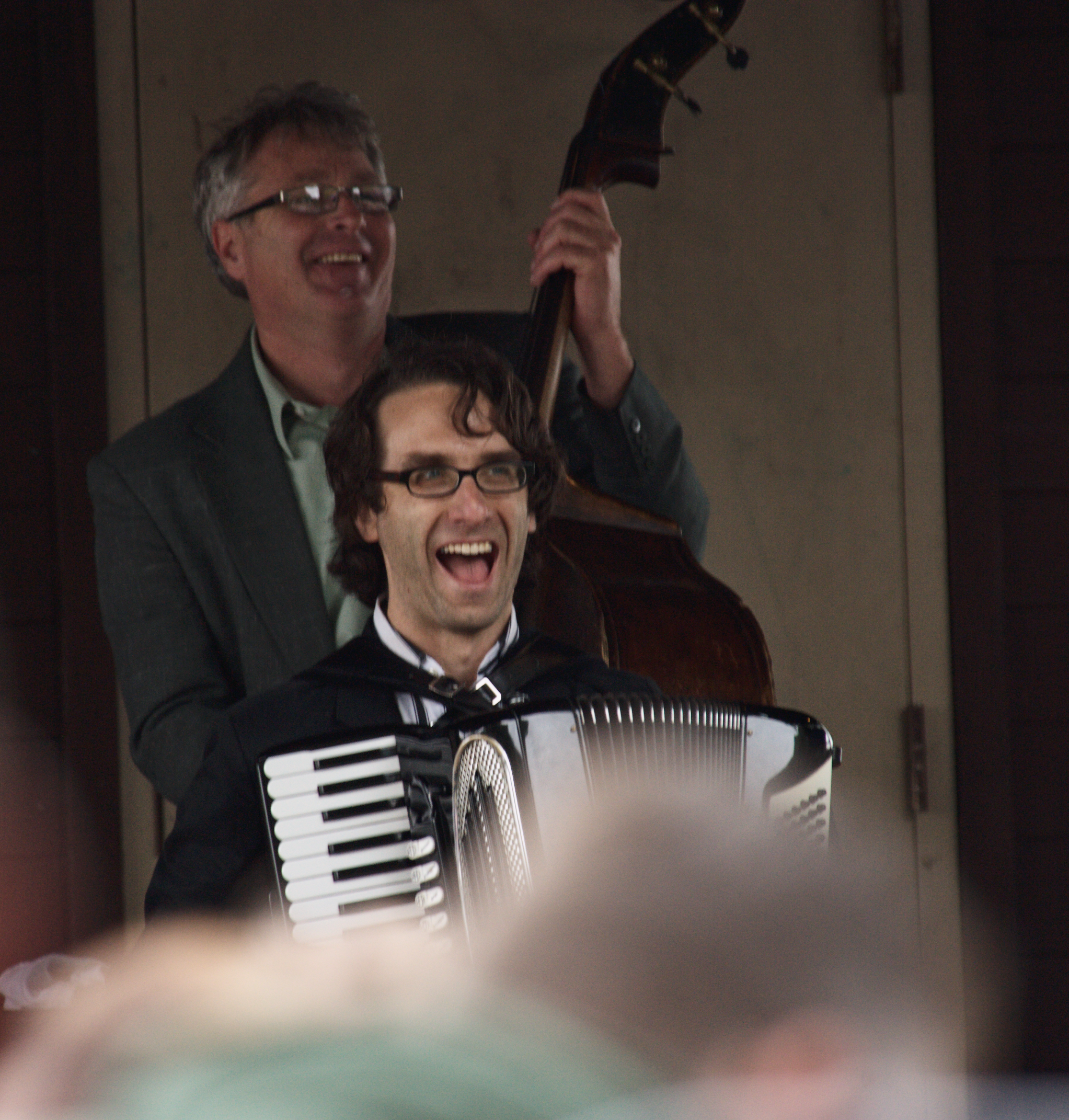
- Reich playing the accordion in 2011

Background information
- Born: Robert Erich Reich; March 8, 1978; Long Island , U.S
- Origin: New York City, U.S
- Died: May 15, 2025 (aged 47)
- Occupation: Musician
- Instruments: Accordion, piano, glockenspiel
- Formerly of: Tin Hat, Gaucho, Circus Bella All-Star Band
- Website: Official website

Rob Reich (March 8, 1978 – May 15, 2025) was an American accordionist, pianist, multi-instrumentalist and composer.

He led a swing band Swings Left.

Reich was bandleader, composer, and accordionist for Circus Bella.

== Education ==
Reich graduated from Oberlin Conservatory of Music in 2000, majoring in composition. He studied with John Luther Adams and Pauline Oliveros.

== Discography ==
Reich played both as a leader and as a sideman

=== As leader ===
- The Balancing Act (2008)
- Shadowbox (2015)
- Swings Left (2019)
- Cloister (2020)

==== Circus Bella All-Star Band ====
- Circus Bella All-Star Band (2011)

=== As sideman ===
==== with Gaucho ====
- Deluxe (2007)
- Deep Night (2009)
- Part-time Sweetheart (2012)
- Thinking of You (2014)
