= Filmworks XXV: City of Slaughter/Schmatta/Beyond the Infinite =

Soundtrack album by John Zorn
- Released: January 29, 2013
- Recorded: June 15 & December 2009 and May 11, 2012
- Genre: Avant-garde, Jazz, Contemporary classical music
- Length: 55:35
- Label: Tzadik TZ 8305
- Producer: John Zorn

John Zorn chronology
The Concealed (2012)	Filmworks XXV: City of Slaughter/Schmatta/Beyond the Infinite (2013)	Lemma (2013)

Filmworks chronology
Filmworks XXIV: The Nobel Prizewinner (2012)	Filmworks XXV: City of Slaughter/Schmatta/Beyond the Infinite (2013)

Filmworks XXV: City of Slaughter/Schmatta/Beyond the Infinite is an album of solo piano pieces composed by John Zorn and performed by Zorn, Omri Mor and Rob Burger which was recorded in New York City in 2009 and 2012 and released on the Tzadik label in January 2013. The album was the last in Zorn's Filmworks series.

== Reception ==
Professional ratings
Review scores
Source	Rating
Allmusic	3.5/5 stars
Free Jazz Collective	4/5 stars

Allmusic said "This is a beautiful recording by virtually any standard". Martin Schray stated "All in all these are typical Zorn compositions presented in an unusual context".

== Track listing ==
All compositions by John Zorn

1. "The End of Tradition" - 3:40
2. "The Oath" - 2:13
3. "Modernity" - 1:27
4. "Island/Ghetto" - 2:34
5. "New Choices" - 2:10
6. "Revolution" - 3:32
7. "New Currents" - 2:43
8. "Loss" - 1:53
9. "Hopes and Dreams" - 1:33
10. "The Bund" - 2:32
11. "City of Slaughter" - 4:44
12. "Anti-Semitism/Pogrom" - 1:24
13. "Pale of Settlement" - 3:03
14. "Requiem" - 2:52
15. "Schmatta" - 1:40
16. "Pins and Needles" - 3:12
17. "Collapse" - 3:06
18. "Hanging by a Thread" - 2:58
19. "Beyond the Infinite" - 8:19

== Personnel ==
- John Zorn (tracks 15–18), Omri Mor (tracks 1–14), Rob Burger (track 19) - piano

=== Production ===
- Marc Urselli - engineer, audio mixer
- John Zorn and Kazunori Sugiyama – producers
