= The Kid Stays in the Picture =

1994 autobiography and 2002 film

- Directed by: Nanette Burstein; Brett Morgen
- Written by: Nanette Burstein; Brett Morgen
- Produced by: Nanette Burstein; Brett Morgen
- Narrated by: Robert Evans
- Music by: Jeff Danna
- Distributed by: USA Films (United States); StudioCanal (International)
- Release date: January 18, 2002
- Running time: 93 minutes
- Country: United States
- Language: English

The Kid Stays in the Picture is a 1994 print autobiography by film producer Robert Evans. A film adaptation of the book was released in 2002.

The title comes from a line attributed to studio head Darryl F. Zanuck, who was defending Evans after some of the actors involved in the film The Sun Also Rises (1957) had recommended he be removed from the cast.

The film adaptation was directed by Nanette Burstein and Brett Morgen and released by USA Films. It was screened out of competition at the 2002 Cannes Film Festival.

== Synopsis ==
=== Book ===
The book chronicles Evans' rise from childhood to radio star to film actor to production chief of Paramount Pictures to independent producer, his marriage to Ali MacGraw, his downfall including his 1980 cocaine bust and implication in the murder of Roy Radin, aka "The Cotton Club Murder", his banishment from Paramount Pictures, and his return to the studio in the early 1990s.

The audiobook version was read by Evans himself, with (presumably impromptu) additions.

A revised edition of the book, published in 1995, adds several chapters of new material, including material on his projects after his return to Paramount Pictures.

=== Film ===
The film version, released July 26, 2002, uses Evans' narration interspersed mostly with photographs from Evans' life as well as brief film footage from films such as Love Story, The Sun Also Rises, Rosemary's Baby, Chinatown, and The Godfather, to tell the story of his life from his discovery by Norma Shearer for Man of a Thousand Faces in 1957 to his return to Paramount Pictures.

According to the commentary by directors Burstein and Morgen on the DVD, many elements from the book, such as Evans' childhood and his other marriages (the film concentrates only on his marriage to Ali MacGraw), were dropped because they felt they did not move the story along.

== Film production ==
The film was produced by Graydon Carter and had been intended to be distributed through Vanity Fair issues, though that was deemed too much of an expense. Nanette Burstein and Brett Morgen co-directed the documentary. Morgen wrote the script, and the film was distributed through USA Films. Jeff Danna composed the score, while John Bailey served as cinematographer with Jun Diaz editing the film.

== Critical response ==
On review aggregator Rotten Tomatoes, the film holds an approval rating of 91% based on 112 reviews, with an average rating of 7.69/10. The website's critical consensus reads, "Though not objective by any means, The Kid Stays in the Picture is irresistibly entertaining." Metacritic, which uses a weighted average, assigned the film a score of 75 out of 100, based on 31 critics, indicating "generally favorable" reviews.

== Stage production ==
An adaptation of the book—along with material from a further, unpublished volume of Evans' memoirs—for the Broadway stage was announced in 2010, to be written by Jon Robin Baitz and directed by Richard Eyre, but the production was canceled in 2011.

Another stage adaptation of the book was first performed at the Royal Court Theatre in London in 2017. It was adapted by the Complicité theatre company and directed by Simon McBurney. The cast included Danny Huston, son of John Huston, who worked with Evans on Chinatown in 1974.

== In popular culture ==
The film's success resulted in Evans creating an adult cartoon version in which he named himself Kid Notorious and his mansion Woodland. He voiced the main character himself, with Sharon Stone appearing in the first episode.

The film version was parodied in the IFC series Documentary Now! with Bill Hader as Jerry Wallach.

Robert Evans and his book appear in Moby's "We Are All Made of Stars" videoclip.
