= Trouble (2017 film) =

- Film poster
- Directed by: Theresa Rebeck
- Written by: Theresa Rebeck
- Produced by: Jaclyn Bashoff; Julie Buck; Rachel Dengiz; Theresa Rebeck
- Starring: Anjelica Huston; Bill Pullman; David Morse
- Cinematography: Christina Voros
- Edited by: Sara Shaw
- Music by: Rob Burger
- Production companies: Slendro Media; Washington Square Films
- Distributed by: WME Global; Great Point Media
- Release dates: June 8, 2017 (Seattle); October 5, 2018 (United States)
- Running time: 100 minutes
- Country: United States
- Language: English

Trouble is a 2017 American independent comedy-drama film written and directed by Theresa Rebeck and starring Anjelica Huston, Bill Pullman and David Morse. Huston serves as one of the executive producers of the film.

== Cast ==
- Anjelica Huston as Maggie
- Bill Pullman as Ben
- David Morse as Gerry
- Julia Stiles as Rachel
- Brian d'Arcy James as Logan
- Jim Parrack as Curt
- Victor Williams as Ray

== Release and reception ==
The film made its worldwide premiere at the Seattle International Film Festival.

John DeFore of The Hollywood Reporter gave the film a positive review and wrote that "the cast goes a long way here, turning Trouble at times into the kind of small-town hangout film that will please [festival audiences]."
