= The Concealed =

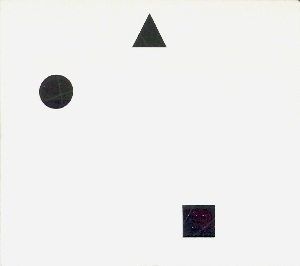

Studio album by John Zorn
- Released: October 27, 2012
- Recorded: May 21, 2012, East Side Studio, NYC
- Genres: Jazz, avantgarde music
- Length: 62:33
- Label: Tzadik TZ 8304
- Producer: John Zorn

John Zorn chronology
| Music and Its Double (2012) | The Concealed (2012) | Filmworks XXV: City of Slaughter/Schmatta/Beyond the Infinite (2013) |

The Concealed (subtitled Esoteric Secrets and Hidden Traditions of the East) is an album composed by John Zorn. The album was released on Zorn's own label, Tzadik Records, in November 2012. The world premiere of this piece took place on 18 May 2012, in Victoriaville. It was recorded on 21 May 2012, in East Side Sound Studio in New York City.

== Reception ==
Professional ratings
Review scores
| Source | Rating |
|---|---|
| Allmusic | 4/5 stars |
| Free Jazz Collective | 4/5 stars |

Allmusic said "These are formal compositions, played with a light and spacious touch; compelling textures and rhythmic variety add dimension while limited but stunning improvisational acumen is also on display. For its dreamy accessibility and sheer lyricism, The Concealed feels like a recital of sacred songs, rooted in history and layered in mystery, interpreted through Zorn's dual role as composer and medium". Martin Schray noted, "The album is especially great because of its variety, its accessibility, its rhythmic and harmonic complexity and its awe-inspiring musicianship".

== Track listing ==
All compositions by John Zorn

| No. | Title | Length |
|---|---|---|
| 1. | "Persepolis" | 4:02 |
| 2. | "The Hidden Book" | 2:57 |
| 3. | "Passage to Essentuki" | 3:44 |
| 4. | "Pathway of Fire" | 4:01 |
| 5. | "Towards Kafiristan" | 3:29 |
| 6. | "Kavanah" | 5:03 |
| 7. | "Back to Bokhara" | 5:24 |
| 8. | "The Silver Thread" | 4:28 |
| 9. | "The Dervish" | 6:33 |
| 10. | "The Way of the Sly Man" | 3:50 |
| 11. | "Amu Darya" | 4:45 |
| 12. | "A Portrait of Moses Cordovero" | 5:37 |
| 13. | "Visitation of the Night Angels" | 4:09 |
| 14. | "Life Is Real Only Then, When "I Am"" | 4:31 |

== Personnel ==
- Mark Feldman − violin
- Erik Friedlander − cello
- John Medeski − piano
- Kenny Wollesen − vibraphone
- Trevor Dunn − bass
- Joey Baron − drums
