= Book of Silk (album) =

Studio album by Tin Hat Trio
- Released: August 10, 2004
- Genre: Chamber music; jazz
- Length: 52:03
- Label: Ropeadope; Rykodisc
- Producer: Hans Wendl; Tin Hat Trio

Tin Hat Trio chronology
The Rodeo Eroded (2002)	Book of Silk (2004)	La giusta distanza (2007)

Book of Silk is the fourth album of Tin Hat Trio. It is a modern chamber music work, encompassing jazz in the Django and Grappelli vein with a haunting, acoustic soundscape that might have served as a film score.

== Reception ==
Professional ratings
Review scores
Source	Rating
All About Jazz	(positive)
AllMusic	3.5/5 stars
BBC	(positive)
Pitchfork	7.8/10
PopMatters	{positive}

Reviews were uniformly positive, with critics noting the more introspective and entirely instrumental turn, save for the closing lullaby. That final track, with lyrics by Mike Coykendall, was a response to the death of guitarist Mark Orton's wife Lauren in a rafting accident.

== Track listing ==
1. "The Longest Night" – 3:54 (Orton)
2. "The Clandestine Adventures of Ms. Merz" – 2:20 (Burger)
3. "Compay" – 4:52 (Kihlstedt)
4. "Invisible Mobile " – 4:45 (Orton)
5. "March of the Smallest Feet" (Kihlstedt) – 3:58 (Kihlstedt)
6. "Hotel Aurora" – 3:38 (Orton)
7. "Osborne Avenue" – 3:34 (Burger)
8. "Elliott Carter Family" – 3:52 (Parkins / Tin Hat Trio)
9. "Things That Might Have Been" – 4:26 (Burger)
10. "Red Hook Stoop" – 4:48 (Burger)
11. "Same Shirt, Different Day" – 1:55 (Burger)
12. "Pablo Looks Back" – 1:09 (Kihlstedt)
13. "Light Black from Pole to Pole" – 2:49 (Kihlstedt)
14. "Lauren's Lullaby" – 4:12 (Orton)
15. "Empire of Light" – 2:59 (Orton / Coykedndall [sic], arr. Orton)

== Personnel ==
- Mark Orton – guitar, banjo, dobro
- Carla Kihlstedt – violin, viola, voice
- Rob Burger – accordion, piano, prepared piano, toy piano, field organ, celeste
- Bryan Smith – tuba, euphonium
- Zeena Parkins – harp

== Song use ==
"March of the Smallest Feet" appeared on the documentary A Fierce Green Fire (2012).

"The Longest Night" was used as the background music for the flash game Tri-Achnid by Edmund McMillen.
