= Lemma (album) =

Studio album by John Zorn
- Released: February 26, 2013
- Recorded: May, July & December 2012
- Genre: Avant-garde, Contemporary classical music
- Length: 54:23
- Label: Tzadik TZ 8095
- Producer: John Zorn

John Zorn chronology
Filmworks XXV: City of Slaughter/Schmatta/Beyond the Infinite (2013)	Lemma (2013)	The Mysteries (2013)

Lemma is an album composed by John Zorn and featuring violinists David Fulmer, Chris Otto and Pauline Kim which as recorded in New York City in 2012 and released on the Tzadik label in February 2013.

== Reception ==
Professional ratings
Review scores
Source	Rating
Free Jazz Collective	3.5/5 stars

Martin Schray stated "Although John Zorn has been widely acclaimed for his music, his compositions in the field of new classical music deserve more attention".

== Track listing ==
All compositions by John Zorn

1. "Apophthegms First Set I" – 0:45
2. "Apophthegms First Set II" – 1:07
3. "Apophthegms First Set III" – 1:44
4. "Apophthegms First Set IV" – 1:23
5. "Apophthegms First Set V" – 1:44
6. "Apophthegms First Set VI" – 1:50
7. "Apophthegms Second Set VII" – 2:41
8. "Apophthegms Second Set VIII" – 1:49
9. "Apophthegms Second Set IX" – 2:05
10. "Apophthegms Second Set X" – 1:20
11. "Apophthegms Second Set XI" – 1:55
12. "Apophthegms Second Set XII" – 2:47
13. "Passagen" – 14:19
14. "Ceremonial Music I" – 5:27
15. "Ceremonial Music II" – 4:05
16. "Ceremonial Music III" – 5:51
17. "Ceremonial Music IV" – 3:49

== Personnel ==
- Chris Otto (tracks 1–12), David Fulmer (tracks 1–12 & 14–17), Pauline Kim (track 13) – violin

=== Production ===
- Marc Urselli – engineer, audio mixer
- John Zorn and Kazunori Sugiyama – producers

== See also ==
- Zorn's lemma
