= NY77: The Coolest Year in Hell =

- Written by: Nanette Burstein; Jonathan Mahler
- Directed by: Henry Corra
- Starring: Geraldo Rivera; Hilly Kristal; Frankie Knuckles; Sal Abbatiello; Grandmaster Caz; Afrika Bambaataa; DJ Disco Wiz; DJ Hollywood; Annie Sprinkle; Ed Koch; KRS-One

Production
- Producer: Nanette Burstein
- Running time: 83 minutes

Original release
- Network: VH1
- Release: 2007

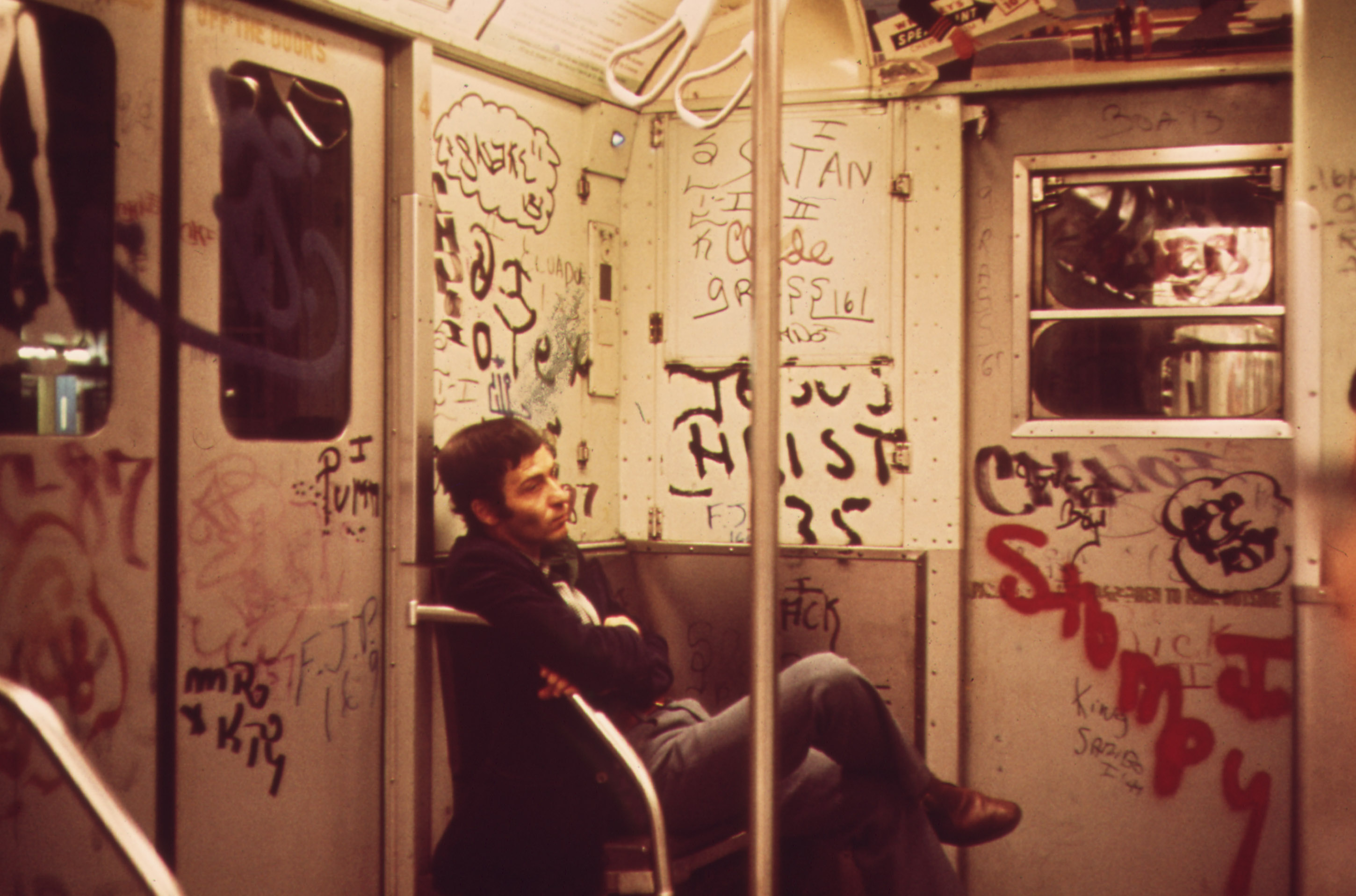
New York City subways were covered with graffiti until the concerted cleanup initiatives and broken windows enforcement of the 1980s.

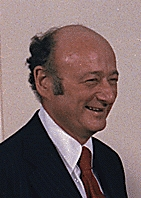
Ed Koch won the 1977 New York City mayoral election at one of the lowest points in the city's history.

NY77: The Coolest Year in Hell is a 2007 documentary directed by Henry Corra that originally aired on VH1.

== Overview ==
A reminiscence on life in New York City during the year 1977. It chronicles the decay of a city plagued by economic decline, rampant crime, the Son of Sam killings, and the July 13–14 blackout. These events provided the breeding ground for both the punk rock and hip hop movements that would eventually spread worldwide throughout the 1980s.
