= Brett Morgen =

American filmmaker (born 1968)

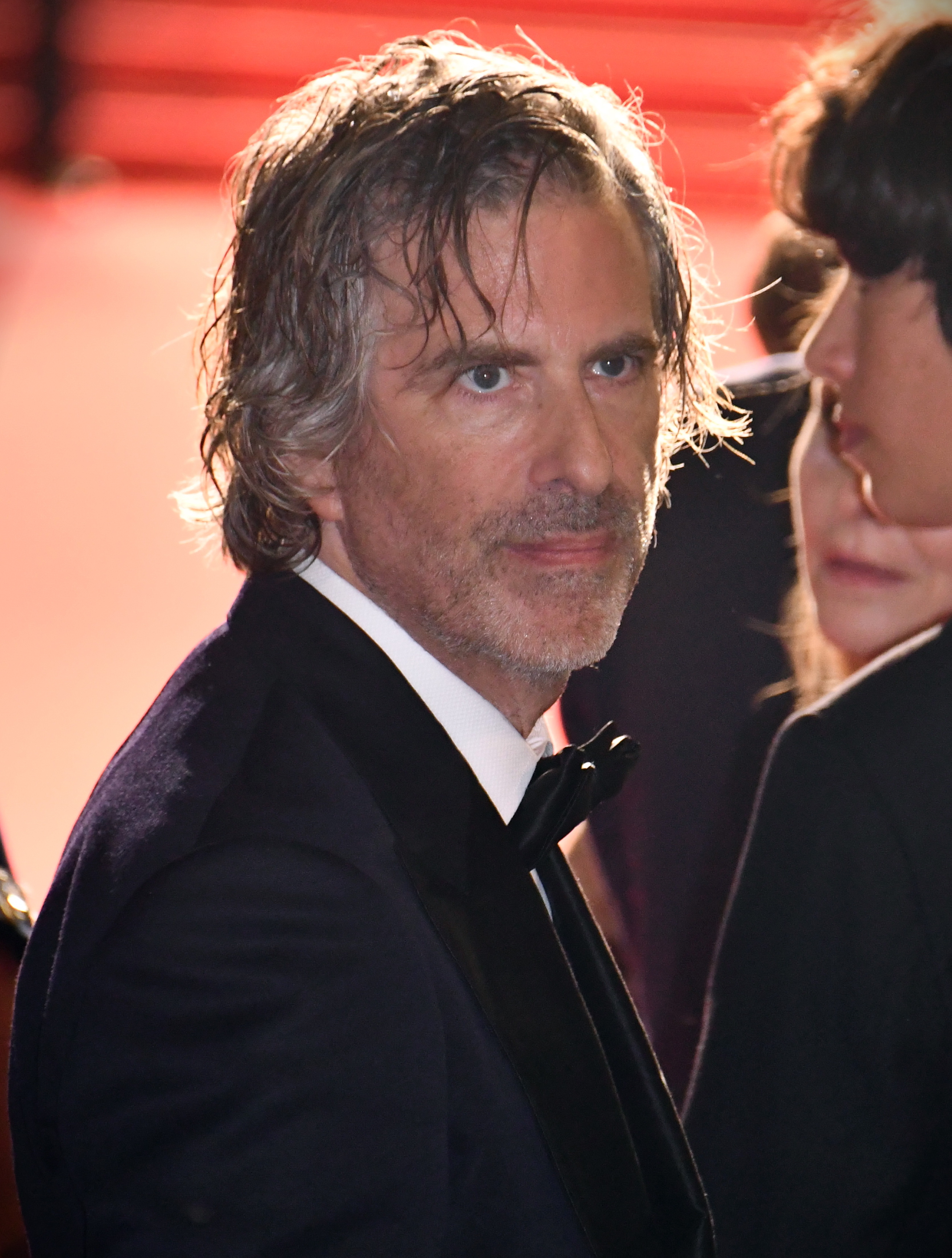
- Morgen at the 2022 Cannes Film Festival
- Born: October 11, 1968 (age 57); Los Angeles, California, U.S.
- Education: Hampshire College (BA); New York University (MFA)
- Occupations: Film director, producer
- Spouse: Debra Eisenstadt
- Children: 3

Brett D. Morgen (born October 11, 1968) is an American documentary filmmaker. His directorial credits include The Kid Stays in the Picture (2002), Crossfire Hurricane (2012), Kurt Cobain: Montage of Heck (2015), Jane (2017), and Moonage Daydream (2022).

== Early life ==
Morgen was born October 11, 1968, in Los Angeles, California. He was named after USC football lineman Britt Williams, who was team captain in 1961, but his parents misspelled the name. He was raised in the San Fernando Valley, primarily in Studio City, where his father worked as a high school physical education teacher. According to Morgen, he was an avid movie fan from a young age, and knew he wanted to be a filmmaker. He attended the Crossroads School in Santa Monica, California.

Morgen attended Hampshire College in Amherst, Massachusetts, where he earned a B.A. in history in 1987, before graduating with an MFA in filmmaking from New York University in 1991.

== Career ==
Morgen made Ollie's Army while a student at New York University. The film focuses on the exploits of the James Madison University College Republicans during Oliver North's senatorial campaign of 1994.

On the Ropes was nominated for an Academy Award in 2000 for Best Documentary. The boxing documentary was directed by Morgen and Nanette Burstein, and examined the lives of three aspiring prizefighters and their coach. The film won Outstanding Directorial Achievement in Documentary by the Directors Guild of America.

The Kid Stays in the Picture is a documentary biopic about film producer Robert Evans, focusing on his major hits, like The Godfather, and his tumultuous personal life. Once again, Morgen teamed with Nanette Burstein.

Chicago 10 is a film about the Chicago Eight. The film uses animation and celebrity voice-overs from Hank Azaria, Dylan Baker, Nick Nolte, Mark Ruffalo, Roy Scheider, Liev Schreiber, James Urbaniak, and Jeffrey Wright.

June 17th, 1994 aired on ESPN as an episode of 30 for 30 and featured on-air commentary by Morgen. It was the only 30 for 30 episode to date that included no interviews or voice-overs, consisting solely of the actual TV footage on June 17, 1994. This was the date of the O. J. Simpson slow-moving police chase, and the other important sports stories of that day that were mostly ignored, due to the American public's fascination with Simpson.

Next, Morgan directed Crossfire Hurricane (2012), a documentary on The Rolling Stones, followed by the Kurt Cobain documentary film Kurt Cobain: Montage of Heck (2015). His next film was Jane (2017), which follows the life of primatologist Jane Goodall, produced by National Geographic.

Morgen began working on the David Bowie documentary Moonage Daydream in 2017. The film was released theatrically in 2022 after premiering at the Cannes Film Festival.

== Personal life ==
Morgen is married to filmmaker Debra Eisenstadt, with whom he has three children: Sky, Max and Jasper.

On January 5, 2017, while working on the film Moonage Daydream, Morgen suffered a near-fatal heart attack and flatlined three times while receiving medical care. The heart attack resulted in Morgen being in a coma for a week, but he survived. In a 2022 interview, Morgen attributed his heart attack to years of smoking, stress, and lack of exercise.

== Filmography ==
=== Feature-length films ===
- Ollie's Army (1996)
- On the Ropes (1999) (Academy Award for Best Documentary Feature nomination)
- The Kid Stays in the Picture (2002)
- The Sweet Science (2003)
- Chicago 10 (2007)
- Truth in Motion (2010)
- June 17th, 1994 (2010) (30 for 30)
- Crossfire Hurricane (2012)
- Kurt Cobain: Montage of Heck (2015) (Primetime Emmy Award for Outstanding Directing for a Documentary/Nonfiction Program nomination)
- Jane (2017) (Primetime Emmy Award for Outstanding Directing for a Documentary/Nonfiction Program winner)
- Moonage Daydream (2022)

=== Television series ===
- On Tour (1997)
- Say It Loud (2001)
- "Nimrod Nation" (2007) Won Peabody Award (2008)
- Marvel's Runaways (2017)

== Awards and nominations ==
Year	Title	Award	Result
2023	Moonage Daydream	Outstanding Directing for a Documentary/Nonfiction Program	Nominated
2023	Moonage Daydream	Outstanding Writing for a Nonfiction Program	Nominated
2023	Moonage Daydream	Outstanding Picture Editing for a Nonfiction Program	Nominated
2023	Moonage Daydream	Outstanding Sound Editing for a Nonfiction or Reality Program (Single or Multi-Camera)	Won
2023	Moonage Daydream	Grammy Award for Best Music Film	Won
2018	Jane	Cinema for Peace International Green Film Award	Won
2018	Jane	BAFTA Film Award for Best Documentary	Nominated
2018	Jane	Cinema Eye Audience Choice Award	Won
2018	Jane	Copenhagen International Documentary Festival Politiken's Audience Award	Nominated
2018	Jane	Gold Derby Award for Best Documentary Feature	Nominated
2018	Jane	International Online Cinema Award for Best Documentary	Nominated
2018	Jane	OFTA Best Documentary Picture	Nominated
2018	Jane	Primetime Emmy for Outstanding Directing for Nonfiction Programming	Won
2018	Jane	Primetime Emmy for Outstanding Writing for a Nonfiction Program	Nominated
2018	Jane	Primetime Emmy for Outstanding Picture Editing for Nonfiction Programming	Nominated
2018	Jane	Primetime Emmy for Exceptional Merit in Documentary Filmmaking	Nominated
2018	Jane	Producers Guild of America Award for Outstanding Producer of Documentary Theatrical Motion Pictures	Nominated
2018	Jane	Thessaloniki Documentary Film Festival WWF Award	Nominated
2018	Jane	Writers Guild of America Award for Best Documentary Screenplay	Won
2017	Jane	Amsterdam International Film Festival Audience Favorite Award	Nominated
2017	Jane	Awards Circuit Community Award for Best Documentary Feature	Nominated
2017	Jane	BFI London Film Festival Grierson Award for Best Documentary	Won
2017	Jane	Zelda Penzel Giving Voice to the Voiceless Award	Nominated
2017	Jane	Philadelphia Film Festival Student Choice Award	Won
2016	Kurt Cobain: Montage of Heck	American Cinema Editors Eddie Award for Best Edited Documentary Feature	Nominated
2016	Kurt Cobain: Montage of Heck	Cinema Eye Audience Choice Award	Nominated
2016	Kurt Cobain: Montage of Heck	Cinema Eye Honors Award for Outstanding Achievement in Editing	Nominated
2016	Kurt Cobain: Montage of Heck	Seattle Film Critics Award	Nominated
2016	Kurt Cobain: Montage of Heck	Writers Guild of America Award for Best Documentary Screenplay	Nominated
2015	Kurt Cobain: Montage of Heck	Ashland Independent Film Award for Best Editing: Feature Length Documentary	Won
2015	Kurt Cobain: Montage of Heck	International Documentary Association Creative Recognition Award for Best Editing	Won
2015	Kurt Cobain: Montage of Heck	Primetime Emmy for Outstanding Picture Editing for Nonfiction Programming	Nominated
2015	Kurt Cobain: Montage of Heck	Primetime Emmy for Outstanding Directing for Nonfiction Programming	Nominated
2015	Kurt Cobain: Montage of Heck	Primetime Emmy for Outstanding Documentary or Nonfiction Special	Nominated
2015	Kurt Cobain: Montage of Heck	Primetime Emmy for Outstanding Writing for Nonfiction Programming	Nominated
2013	Crossfire Hurricane	FOCAL Award for Best Use of Footage in a Production Featuring Music	Won
2009	Chicago 10	Writers Guild of America Award for Best Documentary Screenplay	Nominated
2008	Chicago 10	Cinema Eye Honors Award for Outstanding Achievement in Production	Nominated
2008	Chicago 10	SLFCA Award Best Animated Film	Nominated
2007	Chicago 10	Silver Hugo Award for Best Documentary Feature	Won
2003	The Kid Stays in the Picture	International Online Cinema Award for Best Documentary	Nominated
2003	The Kid Stays in the Picture	OFTA Film Award	Nominated
2000	On the Ropes	Academy Awards Best Documentary Feature	Nominated
2000	On the Ropes	Directors Guild of America Award for Outstanding Directorial Achievement in Documentary	Won
2000	On the Ropes	Film Independent Spirit Truer Than Fiction Award	Nominated
1999	On the Ropes	International Documentary Association Award for Best Documentary Feature	Won
1999	On the Ropes	Silver Spire Award for Film & Video - Society and Culture	Won
1999	On the Ropes	Sundance Film Festival Special Jury Prize for Documentary	Won
1999	On the Ropes	Sundance Film Festival Grand Jury Prize for Documentary	Nominated
1999	On the Ropes	Taos Talking Picture Festival Land Grant Award	Nominated
1999	On the Ropes	Urbanworld Film Festival Jury Prize for Best Documentary	Won
1996	Ollie's Army	UFVA Film Festival First Prize	Won
