= Hillary (film) =

2020 documentary film

- Directed by: Nanette Burstein
- Music by: Will Bates
- Release date: January 25, 2020 (Sundance)
- Running time: 253 minutes
- Country: United States
- Language: English

Hillary is a 2020 American documentary film about Hillary Clinton directed by Nanette Burstein. It had its premiere at the 2020 Sundance Film Festival, and was selected to be shown at the 70th Berlin International Film Festival. The film received overall positive reviews from critics, who praised it for its exploration of Clinton's life.

== Episodes ==
No.	Title	Directed by	Original release date
1	"The Golden Girl"	Nanette Burstein	March 6, 2020
2	"Becoming a Lady"	Nanette Burstein	March 6, 2020
3	"The Hardest Decision"	Nanette Burstein	March 6, 2020
4	"Be Our Champion, Go Away"	Nanette Burstein	March 6, 2020

== Production ==
In late 2017, Washington power broker Robert Barnett contacted producer Howard T. Owens with an offer to produce and sell a documentary about Barnett's long-time client Hillary Clinton, who had 2,000 hours of footage of her 2016 presidential campaign. Owens accepted the offer, and selected Nanette Burstein as his top choice to direct the film. In February 2018, Burstein became Clinton's top choice for the film as well.

Burstein was given complete editorial control over the film. She stated that she attempted to interview multiple conservatives for the film, including Newt Gingrich, but most (except for Bill Frist) refused.

== Release ==
The film was aired as a four-part documentary series on Hulu on March 6, 2020. The international distribution rights was backed by SonyLIV.

== Reception ==
The film received positive reviews from critics. On review aggregator Rotten Tomatoes, the film holds an approval rating of 80% based on 55 reviews, with an average rating of 7.76/10. The site's critics' consensus reads: "Hillary faces the impossible task of consolidating a full life into four hours -- still, it serves as an insightful, often powerful exploration of Hillary Clinton's life and legacy." On Metacritic, the film has an aggregated score of 75 out of 100 based on 21 critic reviews, indicating "generally favorable" reviews.

Writing for RogerEbert.com, Brian Tallerico gave the film a score of 3.5 stars out of 4, describing it as "a razor-sharp piece of filmmaking, a movie that doesn't just hit the chronological beats of Clinton's life but places them in context of how they impacted the campaign and election of 2016" and as "incredible documentary filmmaking no matter your party affiliation, a must-see TV event." He concluded that the film "isn't really designed to win over the detractors of Hillary Clinton as much as offer her fans and the maybe a dozen or so people in the world with no opinion about her a complete look at an important political figure in U.S. history." Dorothy Rabinowitz of The Wall Street Journal wrote that the film "would merit honors for the remarkable frankness of this four-part chronicle of Hillary Clinton‘s life, career and marriage—a buoyant history, its gut-wrenching aspects notwithstanding" and described it as being "never less than mesmerizing".

Writing for IndieWire, Ben Travers gave the film a grade of B+, saying that the film "sets up a divisive read of a divisive figure", and adding: "At its best, "Hillary" isn't just a defense of Hillary Clinton, but a nuanced examination of why we don't yet have a female president." He concluded: "There's simply no way any story ... could encompass everything that Clinton has gone through. Instead, "Hillary" informs in order to pester, asking its audience: "What's your plan for tomorrow? Are you a fighter, or will you cower?" And after revisiting everything Hillary Clinton has done, you too will want to take back the power."

Lidija Haas of The New Republic wrote that the film "serves as a sort of Rorschach blot, in which you'll probably see confirmation of whatever theory about her and the 2016 election you espouse", and added: "Often, the film shares Clinton's own trouble distinguishing between baseless prejudice and substantive critique." She concluded: "What you're seeing isn't Clinton's personal legacy. It's the end of the choke hold that her worldview, so expertly presented here, once had over the Democratic Party." Judy Berman of Time magazine wrote: "The problem isn't that she comes off as disingenuous so much as that people who follow politics ... have heard almost all of this before: Wellesley, Arkansas, Whitewater, Hillarycare, "women's rights are human rights," Monica, Senate, Obama, Benghazi, Trump", and concluded: "As it happens, I don't need Hillary Clinton to go away. I just wish she'd tell us something we don't already know."

Kyle Smith of National Review was critical of the film in his review, writing that it "simply ignores the most sordid and embarrassing aspects of Hillary's life: Juanita Broaddrick, the $100,000 gain Clinton supposedly made in "cattle futures trading," It Takes a Village", and described it as "an episode in its subject's never-ending project to convince the public that we were all wrong about her in every particular and that she therefore should be president."

== Awards and nominations ==
Year	Award	Category	Nominee(s)	Result	Ref.
2020	Primetime Emmy Awards	Outstanding Documentary or Nonfiction Series	Ben Silverman, Howard T. Owens, Nanette Burstein, Timothy Moran, Chi-Young Park, Tal Ben-David and Isabel San Vargas	Nominated	
2020	TCA Awards	Outstanding Achievement in News and Information	Hillary	Nominated	
