= Crossfire Hurricane (film) =

2012 film by Brett Morgen

- Directed by: Brett Morgen
- Produced by: Mick Jagger; Victoria Pearman; Keith Richards; Charlie Watts
- Edited by: Stuart Levy; Conor O'Neill
- Production companies: Milkwood Films; Tremolo Productions
- Distributed by: HBO
- Release date: 18 October 2012
- Running time: 111 minutes
- Country: United States
- Language: English

Crossfire Hurricane is a 2012 documentary film about the Rolling Stones written and directed by Brett Morgen. The film chronicles the early years of the band through to 1981. The film is a series of interviews conducted without cameras, while showing various points of interest that the band is discussing as archival footage. The title of the film comes from the first line of the band's 1968 hit "Jumpin' Jack Flash".

== Synopsis ==
On their 50th anniversary, the Rolling Stones, with the support of archive footage and interviewed by director Brett Morgen, retrace the first 20 years of their career. The film discusses their early success in the 1960s; the way the media characterised the difference between them and the Beatles; the exceptional musical talent of Brian Jones; their first song-writing; the difference between the boy fans' aggressiveness that resulted in fights with the police and the girl fans' screaming hysteria; Mick Jagger and Keith Richards drug use and their arrest; the musical contribution of Jones that was waning due to excessive use of drugs, and his death a few weeks after the separation from the band; Mick Taylor's debut concert in Hyde Park in memory of Jones and the return to world tours; the awful organization of the Altamont Free Concert; their flight to tax exile in 1971; the recording of Exile on Main St. in a villa on the south of France; Taylor's departure and the arrival of Ronnie Wood; and the arrest of Richards in Canada for possession of heroin and his decision to detox, to safeguard the future of the band.

== Critical reception ==
The film received mostly positive reviews. Review aggregator website Metacritic gave the film a 77 out of 100, based on 17 critics.

John Anderson of The Wall Street Journal:

[T]his kind of thing elevates Mr. Morgen's artfully crafted collage, which has a free-associative attitude but a very precise tone of voice. Constructed out of archival materials that include newsreel footage and some never-before-seen outtakes from the better films on this much-documented band (including the Maysles brothers' 1970 Gimme Shelter and Robert Frank's 1972 documentary with the unmentionable title), the movie is full of ripe moments, as well as a sense of being under someone's thumb.

From James Poniewozik of Time magazine:

It's not a movie for music geeks, in the sense of unpacking the band's influences or closely analyzing how their songs worked. Instead it links the music to the members' stories, trying to capture how the electricity of the group's personalities created art. It's not a revelation, but it's an intimate story of the band, with performance sequences that show how five guys—in different lineups—came together and made an entity of pure fire and sex.

From David Hinckley of New York Daily News:

The Stones have been better showcased and explained than they are in Crossfire Hurricane. Still, as personalities and musicians, they never fail to provide a good measure of satisfaction.

The film won a Golden Reel Award for Best Sound Editing: Long Form Documentary.

== Charts ==
Chart (2013/2014)	Peak position
Australian Music DVDs Chart	2
Austrian Music DVDs Chart	4
Danish Music DVDs Chart	8
Irish Music DVDs Chart	9
Italian Music DVDs Chart	6
Swedish Music DVDs Chart	3
Swiss Music DVDs Chart	2
UK Music Videos Chart	1
US Music Videos Chart	1

== Certifications ==
Region	Certification	Certified units/sales
Australia (ARIA)	Gold	7,500^{^}
^{^} Shipments figures based on certification alone.
