= Albert Berger =

American film producer

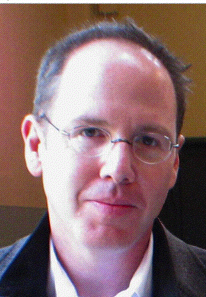
- Berger in 2010
- Born: United States
- Education: Tufts University (BA); Columbia University (MFA)
- Occupation: Film producer
- Notable work: Nebraska

Albert Berger is an American film producer.

== Biography ==
Berger attended Tufts University and the MFA program in film at the Columbia University School of the Arts. He is an executive producer of the HBO series The Leftovers. He and Ron Yerxa are founders of Bona Fide Productions. Berger and Yerxa were nominated for an Academy Award for Best Picture for Nebraska.
