= The Disappearance of McKinley Nolan =

- Directed by: Henry Corra
- Produced by: Jeremy Amar, Henry Corra, Celia Maysles
- Release date: October 1, 2010 (Woodstock Film Festival)
- Country: United States
- Language: English

The Disappearance of McKinley Nolan is a 2010 documentary film directed by Henry Corra, which follows Michael Nolan on the search for his brother McKinley Nolan, a U.S. Army private who vanished during the Vietnam War.

The circumstances of McKinley's disappearance were mysterious, and his status and whereabouts became classified U.S. military information to which the Nolan family was denied access. Retired Lt. Dan Smith returned 40 years later to the U.S. from Tay Ninh, Vietnam having encountered a nameless American man whom he later photo-identified as McKinley Nolan.

The search for McKinley is a deeply personal journey for his brother Michael and includes groundbreaking footage and interviews of former Khmer Rouge and Viet Cong members.

== Cast ==
- Michael Nolan: McKinley Nolan's brother
- Mary Nolan: McKinley Nolan's wife
- Frank Wagner
- Richard Linnett: Journalist researching McKinley's story
- Lt. Dan Smith: Vietnam Veteran
- Roger Nolan: McKinley Nolan's son
- R.L. Brown: Mary Nolan's brother
- Robert Lee Brown Sr.: Mary Nolan's Father
- Congresswoman Sheila Jackson Lee: Assisted the Nolans
- Thach Quang: McKinley Nolan's adopted son
- Ms. Hoa
- Mr. and Mrs. Cong
- Benjamin David Reich: Interpreter
- Cham Sone: Former Khmer Rouge guard
- Nguyen Van Tinh
- Dang Thuan Hoa
- Nguyen Van Thien
- Nguyen Van Tuoi
- Dao Sy To
- Tit Ream
- Thol Koung
- Ung Chun
- Ou Seng Heang
- Ta Sonn
- Sarah Thomas: Interpreter
- Denny Danielson

== Production ==
Production began in 2006 after the story was brought to director Henry Corra by journalist Richard Linnett, who had been following the case for 12 years. Captivated by the Nolans' longing to find McKinley, Corra traveled to Texas to meet them. The timing was perfect, as retired Lt. Dan Smith was scheduling his first meeting with the Nolan family with the news that he saw McKinley Nolan alive.

In the 40 years since McKinley's disappearance, U.S. government cooperation with the Nolan family in their search had been extremely limited. When the filmmakers attempted to gain access to areas in Vietnam and Cambodia where McKinley Nolan was rumored to be, they were denied access on all fronts by the U.S., Vietnamese, and Cambodian governments. Through the efforts of Congresswoman Sheila Jackson Lee, the crew and the Nolan family were able to secure travel visas and permission for entry, as well as access to military records regarding McKinley Nolan.

Actor and activist Danny Glover and Joslyn Barnes of Louverture Films joined the project as Executive Producers, as did Jim Butterworth and Daniel Chalfen of Naked Edge Films. Together with Richard Linnett, Lt. Dan Smith, and several interpreters, the team collected groundbreaking evidence regarding the Khmer Rouge and Viet Cong in their search for McKinley Nolan.
