= On the Ropes (1999 film) =

- Theatrical release poster
- Directed by: Nanette Burstein; Brett Morgen
- Cinematography: Brett Morgen
- Edited by: Nancy Baker; Nanette Burstein
- Music by: Theodore Shapiro & Ray "Web" Davis
- Production company: Highway Films
- Distributed by: Winstar Cinema
- Release date: 1999
- Running time: 94 minutes
- Country: United States
- Language: English

On the Ropes is a 1999 American documentary film directed by Nanette Burstein and Brett Morgen. The film follows the career of three young boxers (Noel Santiago, Tyrene Manson and George Walton) and their coach (Harry Keitt). The film was nominated for Best Documentary Feature at the 72nd Academy Awards. George Walton won the New York Golden Gloves tournament in 1996. He competed as a professional boxer from 1997 to 2009, finishing with a pro record of 20 wins, 4 losses, with 12 knockouts.

== Reception ==
On Rotten Tomatoes, On the Ropes holds an approval rating of 93% based on 14 reviews, with an average rating of 8.0/10. On Metacritic, the film has a weighted average score of 80 out of 100, based on 13 critics, indicating "generally favorable" reviews.

== Awards ==
- Jury Prize, Urbanworld Film Festival, Best Documentary, 1999
- Special Jury Prize, Sundance Film Festival, Documentary, 1999
- Silver Spire, San Francisco International Film Festival, Film & Video - Society and Culture-U.S., 1999
- IDA Award, International Documentary Association, Feature Documentaries, 1999
- DGA Award, Directors Guild of America, Outstanding Directorial Achievement in Documentary, 2000
- SFFCC Awards, Santa Fe Film Critics Circle Awards, Best Documentary, 2000

== See also ==
- List of boxing films
