= Henry Corra =

American documentary filmmaker (born 1955)

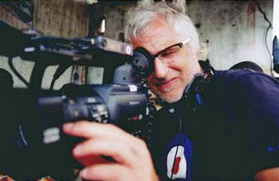
- Born: November 11, 1955 (age 70); United States
- Occupation: Film director

Henry John Corra (born November 11, 1955) is an American documentary filmmaker best known for pioneering what he calls "living cinema".

== Career ==
Corra's films have been exhibited at the Museum of Modern Art, the Louvre, the National Gallery of Art, and the Smithsonian Institution, and are in the permanent collection of the Academy of Motion Picture Arts and Sciences. His work has aired on HBO, Showtime, Netflix, PBS, and MTV. A Sundance Institute and Tribeca Film Institute fellow, he has also directed non-fiction commercials for the American Cancer Society, Mercedes-Benz USA, and Google.

His 1994 film Umbrellas, co-directed with Grahame Weinbren, won the Grand Prize at the Montreal World Film Festival. Variety called it "highly original and structurally flawless". In 2000, Corra made George with his autistic son, which aired on HBO. The Village Voice described it as "an exceptionally intelligent and moving documentary" about "how we define normalcy". His 2007 film NY77: The Coolest Year in Hell received an Emmy Award nomination. Farewell to Hollywood (2014), co-directed with Regina Nicholson, won the Audience Award at EDOX 2013 and the Canon Cinematography Award at Planete + Doc.

== Filmography ==
Year	Title	Notes
1992	Change of Heart	Co-director with Kate Hirson; Aired on PBS/Nova
1994	Umbrellas	Co-director with Grahame Weinbren; Grand Prize, Montreal World Film Festival; screened at Berlin International Film Festival
2000	George	Co-director with Grahame Weinbren; Aired on HBO
2004	Frames	Co-director with Charlene Rule; Premiered at Tribeca Film Festival
2005	Same Sex America	Co-director with Charlene Rule
2007	NY77: The Coolest Year in Hell	Emmy Award nomination
2009	Jack	Co-director with Eben Bull
2010	The Disappearance of McKinley Nolan	
2010	MTV True Life: I'm Ex-Amish	MTV television special
2014	Farewell to Hollywood	Co-director with Regina Nicholson; Audience Award, EDOX 2013; Canon Cinematography Award, Planete + Doc

== See also ==
- The Disappearance of McKinley Nolan
