= Tin Hat =

US musical group

- Also known as: Tin Hat Trio
- Origin: San Francisco, California, United States
- Genres: Chamber Music
- Years active: 1997–2005, 2013–Present
- Labels: Angel, Ropeadope, Hannibal, BAG Production, New Amsterdam
- Members: Carla Kihlstedt; Mark Orton; Ben Goldberg; Rob Reich
- Past members: Rob Burger
- Website: www.tinhat.org

Tin Hat (formerly the Tin Hat Trio) is an acoustic chamber music group currently based in San Francisco, California. Their music combines many genres of music, including jazz, southern blues, bluegrass, neoclassical, eastern European folk music, and avant-garde.

Since its formation in 1997, the original Tin Hat Trio has often expanded its trio format by inviting other musicians to join them. All of their CDs feature guests, among them Tom Waits, Mike Patton and Willie Nelson, as well as friends like clarinetist Ben Goldberg and harpist Zeena Parkins. Parkins appears on 2002's The Rodeo Eroded and 2004's Book of Silk and has performed live with the trio as the resident sound effects artist in their live music/silent film projects. Goldberg has been a frequent guest of Tin Hat Trio and contributed to both Memory Is an Elephant and The Rodeo Eroded.

When founding member Rob Burger (the trio's accordionist and pianist) left the trio in late 2004, Mark Orton and Carla Kihlstedt replaced him with both Goldberg and Parkins, presenting a new, though closely related, ensemble—the Tin Hat Quartet—for two short concert tours in the U.S. in January and April 2005. While on tour, they invited another musician to come under their hat, San Francisco's Ara Anderson—known as one of Tom Waits' favorite sidemen in recent years. Like the departed Burger, Anderson plays myriad keyed instruments as well as trumpet and glockenspiel, thus adding new colors and strokes to the already large canvas of Tin Hat's sound.

In 2005 Tin Hat Trio's song "Fear of the South" was featured on the Everything Is Illuminated soundtrack.

In 2013 the film score to Nebraska was composed by Tin Hat member Mark Orton. The score also includes performances by other members of Tin Hat, providing the first time the three original members have reunited since 2005. A soundtrack album was released on November 19, 2013, by Milan Records.

== Discography ==
- Memory Is an Elephant (1999, Angel/EMI)
- Helium (2000, Angel/EMI)
- The Rodeo Eroded (2002, Ropeadope)
- Book of Silk (2005, Ropeadope)
- La giusta distanza (The Right Distance) (OST, 2007, Radiofandango)
- The Sad Machinery of Spring (2007, Hannibal)
- Foreign Legion (Live recording, 2010, BAG Productions)
- The Rain Is a Handsome Animal (17 Songs from the Poetry of E. E. Cummings) (2012, New Amsterdam)
