= Nebraska (film) =

2013 film directed by Alexander Payne

- Theatrical release poster
- Directed by: Alexander Payne
- Written by: Bob Nelson
- Produced by: Albert Berger; Ron Yerxa
- Starring: Bruce Dern; Will Forte; June Squibb; Stacy Keach; Bob Odenkirk
- Cinematography: Phedon Papamichael
- Edited by: Kevin Tent
- Music by: Mark Orton
- Production companies: Paramount Vantage (Note: Paramount released the movie under their Vantage label, but the logo isn't used on the film nor in any trailers or TV spots. However, the print logo is seen at the end of TV spots and on the poster. On the film itself, the 1954 variant of Paramount Pictures' logo is used.); Blue Lake Media Fund; Bona Fide Productions; Echo Lake Entertainment; FilmNation Entertainment
- Distributed by: Paramount Pictures
- Release dates: May 23, 2013 (Cannes); November 15, 2013 (United States)
- Running time: 115 minutes
- Country: United States
- Language: English
- Budget: $13.5 million
- Box office: $27.7 million

Nebraska is a 2013 American comedy-drama road film directed by Alexander Payne, written by Bob Nelson, and starring Bruce Dern, Will Forte, June Squibb, Stacy Keach, and Bob Odenkirk. Released in black-and-white, the story follows an elderly Montana resident and his son as they try to claim a million-dollar sweepstakes prize on a long trip to Nebraska.

The film was nominated for the Palme d'Or (Grand Prize) at the 2013 Cannes Film Festival, where Dern won the Best Actor Award. It was also nominated for six Oscars, including Best Picture, Best Director, Best Actor for Dern, Best Supporting Actress for Squibb, Best Original Screenplay, and Best Cinematography. The film was acclaimed by critics and became a commercial success, bringing in $27.7 million from the box office on a $13.5 million budget. It was the final film to be released by Paramount Vantage, as Paramount Pictures folded the label after its release.

== Plot ==
In Billings, Montana, a quiet, elderly man named Woody Grant is arrested for walking on the Interstate. He is picked up by his son, David, who learns that he was attempting to walk to Lincoln, Nebraska, to collect a one-million-dollar sweepstakes prize he believes he has won. Despite his family's insistence that it is a mail scam, Woody, who is starting to show signs of dementia, insists on going to Lincoln so he can collect the money and buy a new truck and air compressor. David plans to drive him there just so he can spend time with him and give his mother, Kate, a break. Woody's other son, Ross, does not feel that David owes him anything, because as a parent, Woody was a neglectful alcoholic.

David takes the week off work and starts driving to Nebraska with Woody. While in Rapid City, South Dakota, Woody goes on a bender and drunkenly falls, hitting his head. This results in him having to be admitted to a hospital overnight. David learns that they will be passing through Woody's hometown of Hawthorne in Madison County, Nebraska, and he convinces Woody to stop and see his brother, Ray. At a bar, David meets Woody's former business partner, Ed Pegram, who stole Woody's air compressor decades prior. Woody mentions winning the money, and the news spreads through the town.

The next day, Kate and Ross arrive in Hawthorne. The local newspaper does a story on Woody stopping through town, and its owner, Peg Nagy, tells David that his guarded nature and alcoholism come from being shot down over Korea. That night, Ed corners David about some money he supposedly loaned Woody years ago, threatening legal action if he is not paid. The rest of Woody's family come to visit him as well, and many of the family members demand money that they believe Woody owes them from David and Ross. A fight begins, ending abruptly when Kate calls out the relatives for their own unpaid debts and for using Woody as a free mechanic for decades.

David, Kate, Ross, and Woody tour Woody's childhood farmhouse, which is now abandoned. Woody recalls his childhood, including witnessing his brother's death from scarlet fever. Afterwards, they drive past a house Kate identifies as Ed's, so David and Ross take back Woody's air compressor. Kate soon realizes that the house actually belongs to another couple, and David and Ross hastily return the compressor. Back at the bar, Ed attempts to blackmail Woody by revealing that he cheated on Kate before David's birth. As they leave, they are attacked by Ray's sons, Cole and Bart, who steal Woody's sweepstakes letter. They tell David they threw it away after finding out it was a scam. While looking for it, David and Woody discover Ed reading the letter aloud at the bar, which humiliates Woody. After he takes the letter back and goes outside, David punches Ed in the face.

Woody, dizzy from his head injury, has to sit down, and David tells him they are not going to continue on to Lincoln. Woody tells David that he wants the money so badly because he wants to leave his sons something after he dies. David takes him to the hospital in nearby Norfolk. In the middle of the night, Woody abruptly leaves and starts walking, so David drives him the rest of the way to Lincoln. In Lincoln, Woody is told that he did not win, and the two head back to Billings. However, David trades in his Subaru Outback for a truck and also buys a new air compressor. While driving back through Hawthorne, David hides below the dash and lets Woody take the wheel of his truck for all to see, including Ed. Woody waves goodbye to everyone and drives out of town, then stops in the middle of the road and switches seats with David, who takes them the rest of the way home.

== Cast ==
- Bruce Dern as Woodrow T. "Woody" Grant, David and Ross' father, and Kate's husband
- Will Forte as David Grant, Woody and Kate's youngest son, and Ross' brother
- June Squibb as Kate Grant, Woody's wife, and Ross and David's mother
- Bob Odenkirk as Ross Grant, Woody and Kate's oldest son, David's brother and a local television news anchor
- Stacy Keach as Ed Pegram, Woody's former business partner and the main antagonist of the film
- Mary Louise Wilson as Aunt Martha, Woody's sister-in-law
- Angela McEwan as Peg Nagy, Woody's former girlfriend
- Rance Howard as Uncle Ray, one of Woody's brothers
- Devin Ratray as Cole, Ray and Martha's son
- Tim Driscoll as Bart, Ray and Martha's son
- Melinda Simonsen as the Receptionist in Lincoln

== Production ==
=== Screenplay ===
While working on About Schmidt, Alexander Payne received Bob Nelson's screenplay from Albert Berger and Ron Yerxa, asking him to recommend a director. He asked to direct it himself, but did not want to follow up one road trip film (Sideways, on which he was in pre-production) with another. He decided to wait until after completing The Descendants to begin work on the film. This was the first film of Payne's in which he was not directly involved in the writing process, and he rewrote only a few things prior to the beginning of filming.

=== Casting ===
After first reading the script, Payne thought of Bruce Dern for the role of Woody Grant. As casting for the film began, Payne met with over fifty actors. Because Paramount demanded a big star, Gene Hackman, Robert De Niro, Robert Duvall, Jack Nicholson and Robert Forster were initially short listed for the role. Hackman and Nicholson retired from acting, and Duvall and De Niro declined the role. Payne eventually considered Dern again. Payne chose Dern because, as he said:

Well, he's of the right age now and he can be both ingenuous and ornery. And he's a cool actor. And in a contextual level I haven't seen on the big screen a great Bruce Dern performance in a few years and I'm curious to see what he can do. He's a helluva nice guy as well.

The role of David Grant was desired by several notable Hollywood actors. Bryan Cranston read for the role, but Payne considered him a bad fit. Other considered candidates included Paul Rudd, Casey Affleck and Matthew Modine, who spoke publicly of being considered. Payne later selected Will Forte, despite rumors that a high-profile actor was wanted. He stated:

Will Forte, physically, I believed could be the son of Bruce Dern and June Squibb (who plays Woody's long-suffering wife, Kate). And then I just believe him as a guy I would know around Omaha or meet in Billings. He has a very, very believable quality. And I also think for the character of David he is capable of communicating a certain wide-eyed quality toward life and also damage–like he's been damaged somehow, somewhere.

=== Filming ===
The film was shot with Arri Alexa digital cameras and Panavision C-Series anamorphic lenses. The film's lighting was designed to accommodate black and white screening, and was converted from color to black and white in post-production because Payne said he wanted to produce an "iconic, archetypal look". According to cinematographer Phedon Papamichael, the choice was to use "the poetic power of the black and white in combination with these landscapes and of course the landscapes are playing a huge role in this story". The choice of black and white was made against distributor Paramount Vantage's wishes, though a color master of the film was also produced in an effort to satisfy the concerns; Payne said that he hopes no one ever sees it. Despite this, the network Epix announced in August 2014 that it would show the color version as a "limited time showing".

Nebraska started filming in locations in its namesake state in November 2012. Filming moved to Billings, Montana; Buffalo, Wyoming; and Rapid City, South Dakota, and wrapped in December after a 35-day shoot. Nebraska communities where filming took place include Allen, Battle Creek, Elgin, Hooper, Lincoln, Lyons, Madison, Norfolk, Osmond, Pierce, Plainview, Stanton, and Tilden. The premiere in the namesake state was in Norfolk on November 25, 2013.

=== Music ===
The film score to Nebraska was composed by Tin Hat member Mark Orton. The score also includes performances by other members of Tin Hat, marking the first time the three original members had reunited since 2005. A soundtrack album was released by Milan Records on November 19, 2013.

== Reception ==
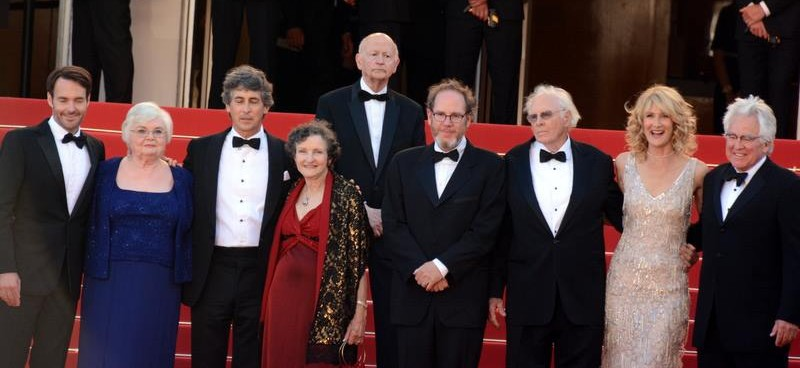
Payne and the cast at the 2013 Cannes Film Festival.

On review aggregator website Rotten Tomatoes the film holds an approval rating of 90% based on 252 reviews, with an average rating of 8.00/10. The site's critical consensus reads, "Elegant in its simplicity and poetic in its message, Nebraska adds another stirringly resonant chapter to Alexander Payne's remarkable filmography." On Metacritic, film has a weighted average score of 86 out of 100, based on 46 critics, indicating "universal acclaim".

In his review following the Cannes Film Festival, Robbie Collin at The Daily Telegraph gave the film four stars out of five, describing it as "a bittersweet elegy for the American extended family, shot in a crisp black-and-white that chimes neatly with the film's concern for times long past." He also said the film was "a resounding return to form for Payne". Peter Bradshaw at The Guardian wrote that Payne had "returned to a more natural and personal movie language", and praised Dern's performance. Joe Morgenstern of The Wall Street Journal noted that "Bruce Dern's portrait of the boozy old coot is a wonder, as well as the capstone, thus far, of that singular actor's career." Writing for Roger Ebert's website, Christy Lemire commented, “The film's starkly beautiful final images have a poignancy that might leave a lump in your throat.”

=== Accolades ===
Nebraska has received several awards and nominations since its release. The American Film Institute included it in their Top Ten Films of the Year. The cast won Best Ensemble from the Boston Society of Film Critics, while Squibb won Best Supporting Actress. Nebraska has received five Golden Globe nominations. It also earned six nominations from the Independent Spirit Awards. Dern and Forte won Best Actor and Best Supporting Actor respectively at the National Board of Review. Nebraska has gathered three Satellite Award nominations and has won Best Cast and Best Supporting Actress for Squibb. The film received two nominations from the Screen Actors Guild Awards.

== See also ==
- List of black-and-white films produced since 1970
- Publishers Clearing House
