= Mark Orton =

American composer and musician

- Occupations: composer, guitarist, arranger
- Instrument: Guitar
- Website: www.markortonmusic.com

Mark Orton (born ca. 1968) is an American composer and musician. An alumnus of the Peabody Conservatory and the Hartt School of Music, he is a founding member of the San Francisco-based Tin Hat chamber music group

As a film composer, he is probably best known for his scores for the Academy Award-nominated film Nebraska (2013) and the Academy Award-winning The Holdovers (2023), both directed by Alexander Payne. A recipient of a Sundance Composer Fellowship and nominee for Best New Composer by The International Film Music Critics Association, some of his other film credits as a composer include The Good Girl (2002), My Old Lady (2014) and Sweet Land (2006), while he has written or performed songs in films including Everything Is Illuminated (2005) and The Boxtrolls (2014).

Orton lives in Portland, Oregon and is a collector of antique and unusual instruments.

== Filmography ==
- Miss You, Love You (2026, dir. Jim Rash)
- Abril (2026, dir. Hernán Jiménez)
- The Holdovers (2023, dir. Alexander Payne)
- The Last Shift (2020, dir. Andrew Cohn)
- The 11th Green (2020, dir. Christopher Münch)
- Loop (2020, dir. Erica Milsom)
- The Lears (2017, dir. Carl Bessai)
- People Places Things (2015, dir. James C. Strouse)
- My Old Lady (2014, dir. Israel Horowitz)
- Joan (2015, dir. Matt Schulte)
- A Place in Hell (2014, dir. David Boorboor)
- Box Trolls (2014, dir. Anthony Stacchi & Graham Annable)
- Best Man Contest (short - 2014, dir. Ben Mercer)
- Drunktown’s Finest (2014, dir. Sydney Freeland)
- The Roosevelts: An Intimate History (2014, dir. Ken Burns)
- Big Significant Things (2014, dir. Bryan Reisberg)
- 9 (short - 2014, dir. Kimberly Warner)
- The Chair of Happiness (2013, dir. Carlo Mazzacurati)
- Nebraska (2013, dir. Alexander Payne)
- Felix Austria! (2013, dir. Christine Beebe)
- Dryland (2013, dir. Sue Arbuthnot)
- Redemption Trail (2013, dir. Britta Sjogern)
- A Tangled Tale (short - 2013, dir. Corrie Francis Parks)
- The Revisionaries (2013, dir. Scott Thurman)
- 360 (2011, dir. Fernando Meirelles)
- Buck (2011, dir. Cindy Meehl)
- CPR (short - 2011, dir. Kimberly Warner)
- Mine (2010, dir. Geralyn Pezanoski)
- The Loss of a Teardrop Diamond (2008, dir. Jodie Markel)
- La Giusta Distanza (2007, dir. Carlo Mazzacurati)
- Orthodox Stance (2007, dir. Jason Hutt)
- Beyond Conviction (2006, dir. Rachel Libert)
- Comrades in Dreams (2006, dir. Uli Gaulke)
- Sukkah City (dir. Jason Hutt)
- Everything is Illuminated (2005, dir. Liev Schreiber)
- Sweet Land (2005, dir. Ali Selim)
- The Real Dirt on Farmer John (2005, dir. Taggart Seigel)
- The Mushroom Club (2005, dir. Steven Okazaki)
- Remarkable Power (2008, dir. Brandon Beckner)
- The Good Girl (2002, dir. Miguel Arteta)

== Partial discography ==
Soundtracks

- My Old Lady (2014, BAG Production Records)
- Nebraska (2013, Milan Records)

Tin Hat

- the rain is a handsome animal (2012, New Amsterdam Records)
- Foreign Legion (2010, BAG Productions)
- The Sad Machinery of Spring (2007, Rykodisk)

Tin Hat Trio

- Book of Silk (2004, Artemis Records)
- The Rodeo Eroded (2002, Ropeadope Records)
- Helium (2000, EMI/Angel)
- Memory Is an Elephant (1999, EMI/Angel)
