= List of 2019 albums =

The following is a list of albums, EPs, and mixtapes released in 2019. These albums are (1) original, i.e. excluding reissues, remasters, and compilations of previously released recordings, and (2) notable, defined as having received significant coverage from reliable sources independent of the subject.

For additional information about bands formed, reformed, disbanded, or on hiatus, for deaths of musicians, and for links to musical awards, see 2019 in music.

== First quarter ==
=== January ===
List of albums released in January 2019
Go to: January | February | March | April | May | June | July | August | September | October | November | December | Back to top
Release date	Artist	Album	Genre	Label	Ref.
January 1	Rogério Skylab	Nas Portas do Cu	Experimental rock, art rock, MPB	Rogério Skylab	
January 4	Legion of the Damned	Slaves of the Shadow Realm		Napalm	
January 8	Gang Parade	Last Gang Parade	J-pop	WACK, T-Palette	
January 11	Born of Osiris	The Simulation	Progressive metalcore, djent	Sumerian	
January 11	The Delines	The Imperial	Country, soul	Decor Records	
January 11	Gnash	We		Atlantic	
January 11	Randy Houser	Magnolia	Country	Stoney Creek	
January 11	Soilwork	Verkligheten	Melodic death metal	Nuclear Blast	
January 14	GFriend	Time for Us	K-pop, hip-hop, R&B	Source, Kakao M	
January 15	Falz	Moral Instruction	Hip-hop, Afrobeat	Bahd Guys Records	
January 16	Astro	All Light	K-pop, electronic pop, dance	Fantagio	
January 16	Little Glee Monster	Flava		Sony Music Japan	
January 17	Christina Perri	Songs for Carmella: Lullabies & Sing-a-Longs		Atlantic	
January 18	Alice Merton	Mint	Dance-pop	Paper Planes, Mom + Pop Music	
January 18	Buke and Gase	Scholars		Brassland	
January 18	Cody Johnson	Ain't Nothin' to It	Country	Warner Music Nashville	
January 18	Crane Like the Bird	Crane Like the Bird			
January 18	Cub Sport	Cub Sport		Cub Sport	
January 18	Deerhunter	Why Hasn't Everything Already Disappeared?		4AD	
January 18	Fever 333	Strength in Numb333rs	Rap metal, trap metal	333 Wreckords Crew, Roadrunner	
January 18	The Flesh Eaters	I Used to Be Pretty	Garage rock, punk rock	Yep Roc	
January 18	Flotsam and Jetsam	The End of Chaos	Thrash metal	AFM	
January 18	Frances Cone	Late Riser	Indie pop, folk-pop, pop rock	Living Daylights	
January 18	Future	The Wizrd	Hip-hop	Epic, Freebandz	
January 18	Guster	Look Alive	Alternative rock, indie rock	Ocho Mule, Nettwerk	
January 18	James Blake	Assume Form	Pop, electropop	Polydor, Republic	
January 18	Joe Jackson	Fool		Edel AG	
January 18	Juliana Hatfield	Weird	Alternative rock, indie rock	American Laundromat	
January 18	Maggie Rogers	Heard It in a Past Life	Indie pop, electropop, folk-pop	Debay, Capitol	
January 18	Malibu Ken	Malibu Ken	Hip-hop	Rhymesayers	
January 18	Mike Posner	A Real Good Kid		Island	
January 18	Papa Roach	Who Do You Trust?	Hard rock, rap rock, alternative rock	Eleven Seven Music	
January 18	Pedro the Lion	Phoenix		Polyvinyl	
January 18	Rifftera	Across the Acheron	Melodic death metal, thrash metal	Inverse Records	
January 18	Ronnie Milsap	The Duets		Sony Music	
January 18	Sharon Van Etten	Remind Me Tomorrow		Jagjaguwar	
January 18	Steve Gunn	The Unseen in Between		Matador	
January 18	Steve Mason	About the Light		Domino, Double Six	
January 18	Switchfoot	Native Tongue	Alternative rock, pop rock	Fantasy	
January 18	Tender	Fear of Falling Asleep		Partisan	
January 18	Thunder	Please Remain Seated	Hard rock, heavy metal	earMusic	
January 18	Toro y Moi	Outer Peace	Synth-pop	Carpark	
January 18	The Twilight Sad	It Won/t Be Like This All the Time	Post-punk revival, indie rock	Rock Action	
January 18	YNW Melly	We All Shine	Hip-hop	300	
January 24	Julia Michaels	Inner Monologue Part 1	Pop	Republic	
January 24	Weezer	Weezer (Teal Album)	Pop rock, synth-pop, power pop	Atlantic, Crush	
January 25	Backstreet Boys	DNA	Pop	RCA, K-Bahn	
January 25	Bethel Music	Victory	Contemporary worship music, Christian country	Bethel Music	
January 25	Better Oblivion Community Center	Better Oblivion Community Center	Folk rock, soft rock	Dead Oceans	
January 25	Blood Red Shoes	Get Tragic		Jazz Life Records	
January 25	Boogie	Everythings for Sale	Hip-hop	Shady, Interscope	
January 25	Bring Me the Horizon	Amo	Pop rock, electronic rock, electropop	Sony Music, RCA	
January 25	The Dandy Warhols	Why You So Crazy		Dine Alone	
January 25	Dave Keuning	Prismism	Alternative rock	Pretty Faithful	
January 25	Dawn Richard	New Breed	Alternative R&B	Local Action Records	
January 25	Fedez	Paranoia Airlines	Pop-punk, emo rap	Sony Music	
January 25	Fidlar	Almost Free	Punk rock, garage punk	Mom + Pop, Dine Alone	
January 25	Heart	Live in Atlantic City		earMUSIC	
January 25	Hunter Brothers	State of Mind	Country, country pop	Open Road	
January 25	Incite	Built to Destroy	Groove metal, thrash metal	Minus Head Records	
January 25	Jack & Jack	A Good Friend Is Nice	Pop	Island	
January 25	Joe Lovano	Trio Tapestry	Jazz	ECM	
January 25	King 810	Suicide King	Nu metal		
January 25	Michael Franti & Spearhead	Stay Human, Vol. II			
January 25	Mike Krol	Power Chords		Merge	
January 25	The Neal Morse Band	The Great Adventure	Progressive rock	Radiant Records, Metal Blade	
January 25	Rat Boy	Internationally Unknown	Rapcore, pop-punk, indie rock	Parlophone, Hellcat	
January 25	Rival Sons	Feral Roots	Blues rock, hard rock	Low Country Sound, Atlantic	
January 25	Rudimental	Toast to Our Differences	House, dance pop	Asylum, Atlantic, Warner Bros.	
January 25	Skunk Anansie	25Live@25		Republic of Music Records	
January 25	Steve Hackett	At the Edge of Light	Progressive rock	Inside Out	
January 25	Sunflower Bean	King of the Dudes		Lucky Number Music	
January 25	Swallow the Sun	When a Shadow Is Forced into the Light	Post-metal, gothic metal, doom metal	Century Media	
January 25	Swervedriver	Future Ruins		Dangerbird	
January 25	Terror Jr	Unfortunately, Terror Jr	Pop	Atlantic, EFFESS	
January 25	Tim Presley's White Fence	I Have to Feed Larry's Hawk	Psychedelic folk, ambient	Drag City	
January 25	Toy	Happy in the Hollow	Indie rock	Tough Love Records	
January 25	Trevor Horn	Reimagines the Eighties		BMG	
January 25	William Tyler	Goes West	Country, folk	Merge	
January 31	Idan Raichel	And If You Will Come to Me	World	Helicon, Cumbancha	
January 31	Sauti Sol	Afrikan Sauce	Afro-pop, R&B	Sauti Sol Entertainment	

=== February ===
List of albums released in February 2019
Go to: January | February | March | April | May | June | July | August | September | October | November | December | Back to top
Release date	Artist	Album	Genre	Label	Ref.
February 1	American Authors	Seasons		Island, Dirty Canvas Music	
February 1	Avantasia	Moonglow	Symphonic metal, power metal	Nuclear Blast	
February 1	Beirut	Gallipoli		4AD	
February 1	Boy Harsher	Careful	Minimal wave, synth-pop, cold wave	Nude Club	
February 1	Brian Cadd	Silver City		Fanfare Records	
February 1	Broods	Don't Feed the Pop Monster		Neon Gold, Island, UMA	
February 1	Busted	Half Way There	Pop-punk	East West	
February 1	Le Butcherettes	Bi/Mental	Garage punk, indie rock, art punk	Rise	
February 1	Cassadee Pope	Stages	Country pop	Awake Music	
February 1	Cherry Glazerr	Stuffed & Ready	Indie rock	Secretly Canadian	
February 1	Claire Richards	My Wildest Dreams	Pop	Sony Music	
February 1	Fredo	Third Avenue		RCA, Since 93, Sony Music Australia	
February 1	Girlpool	What Chaos Is Imaginary		Anti-	
February 1	Guided by Voices	Zeppelin Over China	Indie rock, progressive rock	Rockathon Records	
February 1	Highasakite	Uranium Heart		Propeller	
February 1	Ian Brown	Ripples	Alternative rock	Polydor	
February 1	Ithaca	The Language of Injury	Metalcore	Holy Roar	
February 1	Ladytron	Ladytron	Synth-pop, electropop, electroclash	Ladytron Music, !K7	
February 1	Linda Ronstadt	Live in Hollywood	Rock	Rhino	
February 1	Luis Fonsi	Vida	Latin pop	Universal Latin	
February 1	Nina Nesbitt	The Sun Will Come Up, the Seasons Will Change	Pop, R&B	Cooking Vinyl	
February 1	Olya Polyakova	Koroleva nochi	Pop, Europop	Best Music	
February 1	Rustin Man	Drift Code		Domino	
February 1	The Score	Pressure		Republic	
February 1	Set It Off	Midnight	Pop, pop rock, emo	Fearless	
February 1	The Specials	Encore	Ska, disco, alternative rock	Island, Universal	
February 1	White Lies	Five	Synth-pop	PIAS	
February 1	Within Temptation	Resist	Symphonic metal, pop metal, power metal	Vertigo, Spinefarm	
February 4	Kim Hyun-joong	New Way		Henecia Music	
February 5	Yung Baby Tate	Girls	R&B	Yung Baby Tate	
February 6	The Peggies	Hell like Heaven		Epic Japan	
February 7	Aja	Box Office	Hip-hop	Aja	
February 7	ONF	We Must Love	Dance	WM	
February 8	Ariana Grande	Thank U, Next	Pop, R&B, trap	Republic	
February 8	Bob Mould	Sunshine Rock	Alternative rock	Merge	
February 8	Cass McCombs	Tip of the Sphere	Folk rock, Americana	Anti-	
February 8	Cosey Fanni Tutti	Tutti		Conspiracy International	
February 8	Cyclone Static	From Scratch	Punk rock, garage rock	Mint 400 Records	
February 8	Front Line Assembly	Wake Up the Coma	Electro-industrial, EBM	Metropolis	
February 8	Health	Vol. 4: Slaves of Fear	Noise rock	Loma Vista	
February 8	Jessica Pratt	Quiet Signs	Folk	Mexican Summer	
February 8	Koyote	Reborn		KYT Entertainment	
February 8	LCD Soundsystem	Electric Lady Sessions	Dance-punk, new wave, synth-pop	DFA, Columbia	
February 8	The Lemonheads	Varshons 2		Fire	
February 8	Mavis Staples	Live in London	R&B, soul	Anti-	
February 8	Mayra Andrade	Manga		Sony Music	
February 8	Meghan Trainor	The Love Train	Dance-pop, R&B	Epic	
February 8	Mercury Rev	Bobbie Gentry's The Delta Sweete Revisited	Gothic country	Partisan	
February 8	Panda Bear	Buoys		Domino	
February 8	Wiz Khalifa & Curren$y	2009	Hip-hop	Jet Life, Atlantic	
February 8	Xiu Xiu	Girl with Basket of Fruit	Experimental rock	Polyvinyl	
February 11	Taemin	Want	Pop, R&B	SM	
February 12	Itzy	It'z Different	K-pop	JYP, Dreamus	
February 13	Aimyon	Momentary Sixth Sense		Unborde	
February 13	Chai	Punk		Burger, Heavenly, Otemoyan Record	
February 13	Dreamcatcher	The End of Nightmare		Dreamcatcher Company	
February 13	Mucc	Kowareta Piano to Living Dead		Danger Crue	
February 13	One Ok Rock	Eye of the Storm	Pop rock, electronic rock	A-Sketch, Fueled by Ramen	
February 14	Copeland	Blushing		Tooth & Nail	
February 15	Avril Lavigne	Head Above Water	Pop rock	BMG	
February 15	The Beasts	Still Here	Rock	Bang! Records	
February 15	Bethel Music	Bethel Music en Español	Worship, Latin Christian music	Bethel Music	
February 15	Betty Who	Betty	Pop, synth-pop	AWAL	
February 15	Broken Social Scene	Let's Try the After (Vol. 1)		Arts & Crafts	
February 15	Chaka Khan	Hello Happiness	Dance, disco	Diary Records, Island	
February 15	Czarface and Ghostface Killah	Czarface Meets Ghostface	Hip-hop	Silver Age Records	
February 15	Florida Georgia Line	Can't Say I Ain't Country	Country, country pop	Big Machine	
February 15	Hayes Carll	What It Is		Dualtone	
February 15	Homeshake	Helium	Ambient, psychedelic pop	Sinderlyn Records	
February 15	India Arie	Worthy	R&B	Soulbird Music, BMG	
February 15	Jon Fratelli	Bright Night Flowers		Cooking Vinyl	
February 15	The Long Ryders	Psychedelic Country Soul	Roots rock	Omnivore, Cherry Red	
February 15	Methyl Ethel	Triage		4AD, Remote Control	
February 15	Rotting Christ	The Heretics	Melodic black metal	Season of Mist	
February 15	Ry X	Unfurl		Infectious	
February 15	Ryan Bingham	American Love Song	Americana	Axster Bingham Records	
February 15	SWMRS	Berkeley's on Fire	Punk rock, pop-punk	Fueled by Ramen	
February 15	Tedeschi Trucks Band	Signs	Blues rock	Fantasy, Concord	
February 15	Tiffany Pollack & Eric Johanson	Blues in My Blood	Southern Gothic, blues, blues rock	Nola Blue Records	
February 15	Woman's Hour	Ephyra		Practice Music	
February 15	Yann Tiersen	All		Mute	
February 18	Monsta X	Take.2 We Are Here	K-pop	Starship Entertainment	
February 20	Last in Line	II	Hard rock, heavy metal	Frontiers	
February 20	Marie Ueda	F.A.R.	J-pop	Giza	
February 20	SF9	Narricus		FNC	
February 20	Yoon Ji-sung	Aside			
February 22	Adia Victoria	Silences	Blues, indie rock, Southern Gothic	Atlantic	
February 22	Badflower	OK, I'm Sick	Alternative rock, emo, hard rock	Big Machine	
February 22	Bayonne	Drastic Measures		Mom + Pop	
February 22	Bellows	The Rose Gardener		Topshelf	
February 22	Candlemass	The Door to Doom	Epic doom metal	Napalm	
February 22	Chris Potter	Circuits	Jazz	Edition	
February 22	The Claypool Lennon Delirium	South of Reality	Progressive rock, psychedelic	ATO	
February 22	Desperate Journalist	In Search of the Miraculous	Indie rock, gothic rock, shoegaze	Fierce Panda	
February 22	Diplo	Europa	Dance, electronic	Mad Decent	
February 22	Dream Theater	Distance over Time	Progressive metal	Inside Out Music	
February 22	Gary Clark Jr.	This Land	Pop rock, blues, R&B	Warner Bros.	
February 22	Giggs	Big Bad...	British hip-hop	No BS Music Limited, Island	
February 22	The Gloaming	The Gloaming 3	Folk, Irish traditional, contemporary classical	Real World	
February 22	Gunna	Drip or Drown 2	Hip-hop, trap	YSL, 300 Entertainment	
February 22	Higher Brothers	Five Stars	Chinese hip-hop, trap	88rising, 12Tone	
February 22	Hilltop Hoods	The Great Expanse	Australian hip-hop	Universal Music Australia	
February 22	James Yorkston	The Route to the Harmonium	Folk	Domino	
February 22	John Mayall	Nobody Told Me	Blues rock	Forty Below Records	
February 22	Julia Jacklin	Crushing		Polyvinyl	
February 22	Kehlani	While We Wait		Atlantic, TSNMI	
February 22	Kerli	Shadow Works	Electropop	Seeking Blue	
February 22	Larry Grenadier	The Gleaners	Jazz	ECM	
February 22	Lil Pump	Harverd Dropout	Hip-hop, trap, SoundCloud rap	Warner Bros., Tha Lights Global	
February 22	Lily & Madeleine	Canterbury Girls		New West	
February 22	Michael W. Smith	Awaken: The Surrounded Experience	Contemporary worship music	Rocketown, The Fuel	
February 22	Offset	Father of 4	Hip-hop, trap	Motown, Quality Control	
February 22	Overkill	The Wings of War	Thrash metal	Nuclear Blast	
February 22	Rhapsody of Fire	The Eighth Mountain	Symphonic power metal	AFM	
February 22	Rock Goddess	This Time		Bite You to Death	
February 22	Sleaford Mods	Eton Alive	Post-punk, electro-punk, new wave	Extreme Eating	
February 22	Smif-N-Wessun	The All	Hip-hop	Duck Down	
February 22	Spellling	Mazy Fly		Sacred Bones	
February 22	Telekinesis	Effluxion		Merge	
February 22	T-Pain	1UP	R&B, hip-hop	Nappy Boy, Cinematic	
February 22	Uffie	Tokyo Love Hotel		Uffie	
February 22	Yola	Walk Through Fire	Country, R&B, pop	Easy Eye Sound, Nonesuch	
February 27	Sekai no Owari	Eye	J-pop	Toy's Factory	
February 27	Sekai no Owari	Lip	J-pop	Toy's Factory	
February 28	Ha Sung-woon	My Moment	K-pop	Interpark	

=== March ===
List of albums released in March 2019
Go to: January | February | March | April | May | June | July | August | September | October | November | December | Back to top
Release date	Artist	Album	Genre	Label	Ref.
March 1	2 Chainz	Rap or Go to the League	Hip-hop	Gamebread, Def Jam	
March 1	Anteros	When We Land			
March 1	Bryan Adams	Shine a Light	Rock	Polydor	
March 1	Catherine Russell	Alone Together	Jazz	Dot Time Records	
March 1	Demon Hunter	Peace	Alternative metal, hard rock	Solid State	
March 1	Demon Hunter	War	Metalcore, alternative metal	Solid State	
March 1	Fews	Into Red		PIAS	
March 1	Frankie and the Witch Fingers	ZAM		Greenway Records	
March 1	Hozier	Wasteland, Baby!	Soul, blues	Rubyworks, Island	
March 1	In Flames	I, the Mask	Alternative metal	Eleven Seven, Nuclear Blast	
March 1	The Japanese House	Good at Falling		Dirty Hit	
March 1	Joey DeFrancesco	In the Key of the Universe	Jazz	Mack Avenue	
March 1	Little Simz	Grey Area	UK rap	Age 101 Music, AWAL	
March 1	Marianas Trench	Phantoms	Pop, pop rock, symphonic rock	604	
March 1	Mark Morton	Anesthetic	Hard rock	Spinefarm	
March 1	Pond	Tasmania	Psychedelic pop, neo-psychedelia	Spinning Top, Interscope	
March 1	Queensrÿche	The Verdict	Heavy metal, progressive metal	Century Media	
March 1	Regurgitator's Pogogo Show	The Really Really Really Really Boring Album	Children's music	Valve	
March 1	Reignwolf	Hear Me Out			
March 1	Robert Forster	Inferno	Rock, pop rock	Tapete	
March 1	Self Esteem	Compliments Please	Pop, experimental pop	Fiction	
March 1	Snapped Ankles	Stunning Luxury		The Leaf Label	
March 1	Solange	When I Get Home	R&B, jazz, psychedelic soul	Columbia	
March 1	Sun Kil Moon	I Also Want to Die in New Orleans	Folk rock, indie folk, spoken word	Caldo Verde	
March 1	Teen	Good Fruit	Synth-pop, R&B, psychedelic	Carpark	
March 1	Test Dept	Disturbance		One Little Indian	
March 1	Tim Bowness	Flowers at the Scene		Inside Out, Sony Music	
March 1	Tom Walker	What a Time to Be Alive		Relentless	
March 1	Weezer	Weezer (Black Album)	Pop rock, power pop, electropop	Atlantic, Crush	
March 1	While She Sleeps	So What?	Metalcore, alternative metal	Spinefarm, Sleeps Brothers	
March 1	Ximena Sariñana	¿Dónde Bailarán las Niñas?	Alternative rock, nueva canción, indie pop	Warner	
March 6	Burning Rain	Face the Music	Hard rock, heavy metal	Frontiers, Avalon	
March 6	Sakurako Ohara	Cam On! ～5th Anniversary Best～			
March 6	Zebrahead	Brain Invaders	Pop-punk, heavy metal, punk rock	Avex, MFZB Records	
March 8	Amanda Palmer	There Will Be No Intermission		Cooking Vinyl	
March 8	Children of Bodom	Hexed	Melodic death metal, power metal	Nuclear Blast	
March 8	The Coathangers	The Devil You Know	Punk rock	Suicide Squeeze	
March 8	Dave	Psychodrama	British hip-hop	Neighbourhood	
March 8	David Gray	Gold in a Brass Age		IHT	
March 8	Dido	Still on My Mind	Electro-folk	BMG	
March 8	Foals	Everything Not Saved Will Be Lost – Part 1	Indie rock, dance-rock, dance-punk	Warner Bros., Transgressive	
March 8	Gesaffelstein	Hyperion		Columbia	
March 8	Helado Negro	This Is How You Smile		RVNG Intl.	
March 8	James Morrison	You're Stronger Than You Know		Stanley Park Records	
March 8	Juice Wrld	Death Race for Love	Hip-hop, rock, emo rap	Interscope, Grade A	
March 8	Kari Faux	Cry 4 Help		Change Minds	
March 8	Kerser	Lifestyle		Warner Australia	
March 8	Ligabue	Start		Zoo Aperto, F&P Music Hub, Warner	
March 8	Maren Morris	Girl	Country pop, R&B, pop	Columbia Nashville	
March 8	Meat Puppets	Dusty Notes	Alternative rock, country rock, psychedelic rock	Megaforce	
March 8	Patty Griffin	Patty Griffin	Folk, blues, Americana	PGM Recordings, Thirty Tigers	
March 8	Sasami	Sasami	Shoegaze	Domino	
March 8	Sigrid	Sucker Punch	Pop, electropop, synth-pop	Island	
March 8	Stella Donnelly	Beware of the Dogs	Indie pop, indie rock, indie folk	Secretly Canadian	
March 8	Tesla	Shock	Hard rock	UMe	
March 8	Tom Harrell	Infinity	Jazz	HighNote	
March 8	Týr	Hel	Viking metal, folk metal	Metal Blade	
March 8	William Basinski	On Time Out of Time		Temporary Residence Limited	
March 13	Lil Gotit	Crazy But It's True	Hip-hop, trap	Alamo	
March 13	Silent Siren	31313		Universal Music Japan	
March 14	The Caretaker	Everywhere at the End of Time - Stage 6			
March 14	Koffee	Rapture	Pop, afrobeats, dancehall	Columbia	
March 15	Benjamin Francis Leftwich	Gratitude		Dirty Hit	
March 15	Blaqk Audio	Only Things We Love	Futurepop, Synth-pop	Kobalt	
March 15	Bonnie Tyler	Between the Earth and the Stars	Pop rock, country rock	earMUSIC	
March 15	The Brian Jonestown Massacre	The Brian Jonestown Massacre	Neo-psychedelia	A Recordings	
March 15	Chief Keef and Zaytoven	GloToven	Hip-hop, trap	Glo Gang, RBC	
March 15	The Cinematic Orchestra	To Believe	Electronic, downtempo, nu jazz	Ninja Tune, Domino	
March 15	Dallas Smith	The Fall	Country, country pop	604	
March 15	Dan Sultan	Aviary Takes		Liberation	
March 15	The Faint	Egowerk	Dance-punk, new wave, post-punk revival	Saddle Creek	
March 15	Greyson Chance	Portraits	Synth-pop	AWAL	
March 15	Jack Savoretti	Singing to Strangers		BMG	
March 15	Jerry Garcia Band	Electric on the Eel	Rock	Round	
March 15	Joanne Shaw Taylor	Reckless Heart		Silvertone, Sony Music	
March 15	Johnny Orlando	Teenage Fever		Island	
March 15	Karen O and Danger Mouse	Lux Prima	Psychedelic rock, orchestral pop, trip hop	BMG	
March 15	Matmos	Plastic Anniversary		Thrill Jockey	
March 15	Snarky Puppy	Immigrance	Jazz fusion, funk	GroundUPmusic	
March 15	Sophie Ellis-Bextor	The Song Diaries	Disco	EBGB's, Cooking Vinyl	
March 15	Stephen Malkmus	Groove Denied	Electronic	Matador, Domino	
March 15	Teenage Bottlerocket	Stay Rad!		Fat Wreck Chords	
March 15	UB40	For the Many	Reggae	Shoestring Music Production	
March 15	Vijay Iyer and Craig Taborn	The Transitory Poems	Jazz	ECM	
March 18	VAV	Thrilla Killa		A Team Entertainment	
March 19	Jeong Se-woon	Plus Minus Zero		Starship	
March 19	DIA	Newtro	K-pop	MBK, Kakao M	
March 19	Heize	She's Fine		Stone Music	
March 20	Flume	Hi This Is Flume	Experimental, IDM, wonky	Future Classic	
March 20	Momoland	Show Me	K-pop	MLD Entertainment, Kakao M	
March 22	American Football	American Football (LP3)	Midwest emo, post-rock, dream pop	Polyvinyl, Big Scary Monsters	
March 22	Andrew Bird	My Finest Work Yet	Indie rock, indie folk	Loma Vista	
March 22	Apparat	LP5		Mute	
March 22	Avey Tare	Cows on Hourglass Pond	Neo-psychedelia, psychedelic folk	Domino	
March 22	Christian Scott	Ancestral Recall	Jazz	Ropeadope	
March 22	Dean Lewis	A Place We Knew		Island Australia	
March 22	La Dispute	Panorama	Emo, post-hardcore, spoken word	Epitaph	
March 22	Ex Hex	It's Real	Garage rock	Merge	
March 22	Jenny Lewis	On the Line	Indie rock	Warner Bros.	
March 22	Lambchop	This (Is What I Wanted to Tell You)	Indietronica, electronica	Merge, City Slang	
March 22	Lucy Rose	No Words Left	Indie rock	Communion	
March 22	Meow Meow and Thomas Lauderdale	Hotel Amour		Heinz	
March 22	Michael Ball	Coming Home to You		Decca	
March 22	Mötley Crüe	The Dirt Soundtrack	Heavy metal, glam metal, hard rock	Mötley, Eleven Seven	
March 22	Nav	Bad Habits	Hip-hop, trap	XO, Republic	
March 22	Nesli	Vengo in pace			
March 22	Nilüfer Yanya	Miss Universe	Indie rock	ATO	
March 22	Orville Peck	Pony	Country, alternative country, cowboy pop	Sub Pop	
March 22	Patrice Jégou	If It Ain't Love	Jazz	Prairie Star Records	
March 22	Rich the Kid	The World Is Yours 2	Hip-hop, trap	Interscope, Rich Forever	
March 22	Sleeper	The Modern Age	Indie rock	Gorsky Records	
March 22	These New Puritans	Inside the Rose		Infectious	
March 22	A Wake in Providence	The Blvck Sun || The Blood Moon		Outerloop Records	
March 22	Wallows	Nothing Happens	Indie rock, indie rock	Atlantic	
March 25	Senidah	Bez Tebe	Alternative R&B, trap	Bassivity Digital	
March 25	Stray Kids	Clé 1: Miroh	Hip-hop, EDM, K-pop	JYP, iRiver	
March 26	Logic	Supermarket	Alternative rock	Def Jam, Visionary	
March 26	Park Ji-hoon	O'Clock	K-pop	Maroo	
March 29	Amanda Lindsey Cook	House on a Hill	Contemporary worship music	Bethel	
March 29	Ben Platt	Sing to Me Instead	Pop	Atlantic	
March 29	Beth Gibbons, Polish National Radio Symphony Orchestra and Krzysztof Penderecki	Henryk Górecki: Symphony No. 3 (Symphony of Sorrowful Songs)		Domino	
March 29	Billie Eilish	When We All Fall Asleep, Where Do We Go?	Pop, avant-pop, art pop	Darkroom, Interscope	
March 29	Billy Woods & Kenny Segal	Hiding Places	Hip-hop	Backwoodz Studioz	
March 29	The Black Sorrows	Citizen John		Bloodlines	
March 29	Coez	È sempre bello		Carosello	
March 29	Devin Townsend	Empath	Progressive metal, progressive rock	Sony Music, HevyDevy	
March 29	DJ Muggs and Mach-Hommy	Tuez-Les Tous	Hip-hop		
March 29	Edwyn Collins	Badbea		AED Records	
March 29	George Strait	Honky Tonk Time Machine	Country	MCA Nashville, Universal	
March 29	I Prevail	Trauma	Melodic metalcore, pop metal	Fearless	
March 29	Jake Owen	Greetings from... Jake	Country	Big Loud	
March 29	Jamie Lawson	The Years in Between		Gingerbread Man	
March 29	Joshua Redman Quartet	Come What May	Jazz	Nonesuch	
March 29	L.A. Guns	The Devil You Know	Hard rock, glam metal	Frontiers	
March 29	Laura Stevenson	The Big Freeze	Indie folk	Don Giovanni	
March 29	LoCash	Brothers	Country	Wheelhouse	
March 29	The Maine	You Are OK	Alternative rock	8123	
March 29	Manowar	The Final Battle I	Heavy metal, power metal	Magic Circle Music	
March 29	Marvin Gaye	You're the Man	Soul, funk	Motown, Universal Music Enterprises, Universal	
March 29	Mdou Moctar	Ilana (The Creator)	Desert blues, psychedelic rock	Sahel Sounds	
March 29	The Mekons	Deserted	Punk rock	Bloodshot	
March 29	Neiked	Best of Hard Drive		Neiked Collective	
March 29	Quelle Chris	Guns	Hip-hop	Mello Music	
March 29	Son Volt	Union	Alternative country	Transmit Sound, Thirty Tigers	
March 29	S. P. Y	Dubplate Style	Drum and bass	Hospital	
March 29	White Denim	Side Effects		City Slang	
March 29	Whitechapel	The Valley	Deathcore, groove metal	Metal Blade	
March 29	Wintersleep	In the Land Of	Indie rock	Dine Alone	
March 29	Yelawolf	Trunk Muzik 3	Southern hip-hop, rap rock	Slumerican, Shady, Interscope	
March 31	Jon Anderson	1000 Hands: Chapter One	Art-rock, pop		

== Second quarter ==
=== April ===
List of albums released in April 2019
Go to: January | February | March | April | May | June | July | August | September | October | November | December | Back to top
Release date	Artist	Album	Genre	Label	Ref.
April 5	Alejandro Sanz	El Disco	Latin pop	Universal Music Spain	
April 5	Anitta	Kisses	Latin pop	Warner Brasil	
April 5	Blackpink	Kill This Love	Pop, EDM	YG, Interscope	
April 5	The Brave	Aura	Post-hardcore, metalcore	UNFD	
April 5	Circa Waves	What's It Like Over There?		PIAS, Prolifica	
April 5	Dennis Lloyd	Exident		Arista	
April 5	Don Felder	American Rock 'n' Roll		BMG	
April 5	The Drums	Brutalism	Indie pop, dream pop, synth-pop	Anti-	
April 5	Eluveitie	Ategnatos	Folk metal, melodic death metal, Celtic metal	Nuclear Blast	
April 5	Enterprise Earth	Luciferous	Deathcore	eOne	
April 5	Houston Chamber Choir, Robert Simpson, Ken Cowan	Duruflé: Complete Choral Works	Classical	Signum Classics	
April 5	Idlewild	Interview Music	Indie rock, alternative rock	Empty Words Records	
April 5	Jaws	The Ceiling	Alternative dance, dream pop, grunge	Jaws	
April 5	Khalid	Free Spirit	R&B, pop	RCA	
April 5	Lady Lamb	Even in the Tremor	Rock	Ba Da Bing	
April 5	Periphery	Periphery IV: Hail Stan	Progressive metal, djent, progressive metalcore	3DOT Recordings, Century Media, eOne	
April 5	Pinguini Tattici Nucleari	Fuori dall'hype	Pop, indie pop	Sony Music Italy	
April 5	PNL	Deux frères		QLF Records	
April 5	Priests	The Seduction of Kansas	Post-punk revival, art punk	Sister Polygon	
April 5	PUP	Morbid Stuff	Punk rock, pop-punk	Rise	
April 5	Reba McEntire	Stronger Than the Truth	Neotraditional country	Big Machine	
April 5	Russell Morris	Black and Blue Heart	Rock	Liberation Music	
April 5	Sara Bareilles	Amidst the Chaos		Epic	
April 5	Tayla Parx	We Need to Talk	R&B, pop	Atlantic	
April 5	Ultimo	Colpa delle favole	Pop	Honiro Label	
April 5	Weyes Blood	Titanic Rising	Baroque pop, art rock, progressive pop	Sub Pop	
April 10	Aimer	Penny Rain	Pop, rock	Sony Music Entertainment Japan	
April 10	Aimer	Sun Dance	Pop, rock	Sony Music Entertainment Japan	
April 10	Omar Apollo	Friends		Omar Apollo, AWAL	
April 12	Aaron Lewis	State I'm In	Country	Valory, Big Machine	
April 12	All Tvvins	Just to Exist	Electropop, synth-pop, indietronica	Faction Records	
April 12	Anderson .Paak	Ventura	R&B, soul, funk	Aftermath, 12 Tone	
April 12	Andy Black	The Ghost of Ohio	Rock	Lava, Republic	
April 12	Band of Skulls	Love Is All You Love	Garage rock, pop rock	SO Recordings, Silva Screen Records	
April 12	Bruce Hornsby	Absolute Zero	Folk, rock	Zappo Productions	
April 12	BTS	Map of the Soul: Persona	Pop, R&B, rap rock	Big Hit	
April 12	Capital Bra	CB6		Urban, Bra Music	
April 12	The Chemical Brothers	No Geography	Electronica	Virgin EMI	
April 12	Clowns	Nature/Nurture	Punk rock, hardcore punk	Damaged Records, Fat	
April 12	Dan Sultan	Nali & Friends	Children's music	ABC, Universal Music Australia	
April 12	Emma Bunton	My Happy Place	Pop	BMG	
April 12	Fontaines D.C.	Dogrel	Post-punk	Partisan	
April 12	Ghosts of the Forest	Ghosts of the Forest	Rock	Rubber Jungle	
April 12	Glen Hansard	This Wild Willing		Anti-	
April 12	Jackie Evancho	The Debut	Classical crossover	JE Touring	
April 12	Jay Bellerose, T Bone Burnett, and Keefus Ciancia	The Invisible Light: Acoustic Space	Experimental	Verve Forecast	
April 12	John Paul White	The Hurting Kind		Single Lock	
April 12	Joshua Abrams and Natural Information Society	Mandatory Reality	Free jazz, minimalism	Eremite	
April 12	KSI and Randolph	New Age	British hip-hop, grime		
April 12	LSD	Labrinth, Sia & Diplo Present... LSD	Dance-pop, pop rock, power pop	Columbia	
April 12	Mark Guiliana	Beat Music! Beat Music! Beat Music!		Motéma Music	
April 12	Melissa Etheridge	The Medicine Show	Americana, rock	MLE Music, Concord	
April 12	Sara Storer	Raindance	Country	ABC Music, Universal Music Australia	
April 13	1the9	XIX	K-pop	MBK	
April 13	The Flaming Lips	King's Mouth	Neo-psychedelia, psychedelic rock	Warner Bros.	
April 13	Jeff Tweedy	Warmer		dBpm	
April 13	KCM	Promise		NK Company	
April 17	Beyoncé	Homecoming: The Live Album	Hip-hop, R&B	Parkwood, Columbia	
April 17	Nogizaka46	Ima ga Omoide ni Naru made	J-pop	N46Div	
April 18	Demet Akalın	Ateş	Pop	Doğan Music Company	
April 19	After the Burial	Evergreen	Progressive metal, metalcore	Sumerian	
April 19	Allegaeon	Apoptosis	Melodic death metal, technical death metal	Metal Blade	
April 19	Bananarama	In Stereo	Pop, dance	In Synk	
April 19	Cage the Elephant	Social Cues		RCA	
April 19	Gang of Four	Happy Now	Art punk	Gillmusic	
April 19	Heart Attack Man	Fake Blood	Pop-punk, Midwest emo, grunge	Triple Crown	
April 19	Jade Bird	Jade Bird		Glassnote	
April 19	Lizzo	Cuz I Love You	Pop, R&B, hip-hop	Atlantic, Nice Life	
April 19	Mat Kerekes	Ruby		Roadrunner	
April 19	Seth MacFarlane	Once in a While	Traditional pop, easy listening	Republic, Verve, Fuzzy Door Productions	
April 19	Simi	Omo Charlie Champagne, Vol. 1	Afropop, Afro-soul, R&B	X3M Music	
April 19	The Tallest Man on Earth	I Love You. It's a Fever Dream.	Folk	Dead Oceans	
April 19	Tech N9ne	N9na	Hip-hop	Strange Music, Ingrooves	
April 19	TR/ST	The Destroyer (Part 1)	Industrial, experimental, cold wave	Royal Mountain, Grouch via House Arrest	
April 19	Wand	Laughing Matter		Drag City	
April 22	Twice	Fancy You	K-pop, electropop	JYP	
April 25	Kevin Abstract	Arizona Baby	Hip-hop, pop	RCA, Question Everything	
April 25	Rico Nasty & Kenny Beats	Anger Management	hip-hop, trap, punk rap	Sugar Trap	
April 26	AJR	Neotheater		AJR Productions, BMG	
April 26	Alan Parsons	The Secret	Progressive rock	Frontiers	
April 26	Aldous Harding	Designer		4AD	
April 26	Amon Tobin	Fear in a Handful of Dust		Nomark	
April 26	Beabadoobee	Loveworm	Indie rock	Dirty Hit	
April 26	Blackbear	Anonymous		Interscope	
April 26	Catfish and the Bottlemen	The Balance	Indie rock	Island, Capitol	
April 26	Craig Finn	I Need a New War	Indie rock	Partisan	
April 26	The Cranberries	In the End	Alternative rock	BMG	
April 26	The Damned Things	High Crimes	Heavy metal, hard rock	Nuclear Blast	
April 26	Dean Brody	Black Sheep	Country	Open Road	
April 26	Foxygen	Seeing Other People	Experimental, pop rock	Jagjaguwar	
April 26	Guided by Voices	Warp and Woof	Indie rock	Guided By Voices Inc.	
April 26	James TW	Chapters		Island	
April 26	JJ Cale	Stay Around	Americana, Tulsa sound, blues	Because Music	
April 26	Josh Ritter	Fever Breaks	Folk rock	Pytheas Recordings	
April 26	Kevin Morby	Oh My God		Dead Oceans	
April 26	King Gizzard & the Lizard Wizard	Fishing for Fishies	Boogie rock, blues rock, garage rock	Flightless	
April 26	Marina	Love + Fear	Pop, dance-pop	Atlantic	
April 26	Massive Ego	Church for the Malfunctioned	Dark wave, electronic	Out of Line	
April 26	The Mountain Goats	In League with Dragons	Alternative rock	Merge	
April 26	New Years Day	Unbreakable	Alternative metal, hard rock	Century Media	
April 26	Nick Murphy	Run Fast Sleep Naked		Downtown, Future Classic, Opulent Records	
April 26	Olivia O'Brien	Was It Even Real?	Pop	Island	
April 26	Otoboke Beaver	Itekoma Hits	Hardcore punk, noise rock, alternative rock	Damnably	
April 26	Pink	Hurts 2B Human	Pop	RCA, Sony Music	
April 26	Pitty	Matriz		Deckdisc	
April 26	Rob Thomas	Chip Tooth Smile	Pop rock	Atlantic	
April 26	Schoolboy Q	Crash Talk	Hip-hop	Top Dawg, Interscope	
April 26	Soak	Grim Town	Indie pop, indie folk, art pop	Rough Trade	
April 26	Sunn O)))	Life Metal	Drone metal	Southern Lord	
April 26	Various artists	For the Throne: Music Inspired by the HBO Series Game of Thrones	Pop, hip-hop, R&B	Columbia	
April 26	Various artists	UglyDolls: Original Motion Picture Soundtrack	Electropop, pop	Atlantic	
April 27	Nikolija	Yin & Yang	EDM trap, pop, electropop	IDJTunes	
April 29	RuPaul	Queen of Queens		RuCo Inc.	
April 29	Weatherday	Come In		Porcelain Music	

=== May ===
List of albums released in May 2019
Go to: January | February | March | April | May | June | July | August | September | October | November | December | Back to top
Release date	Artist	Album	Genre	Label	Ref.
May 1	Maps	Colours. Reflect. Time. Loss.		Mute	
May 2	Diplo	Higher Ground		Mad Decent	
May 2	Passenger	Sometimes It's Something, Sometimes It's Nothing at All		Black Crow Records	
May 3	Amon Amarth	Berserker	Melodic death metal	Metal Blade	
May 3	Ashley Tisdale	Symptoms	Pop, electropop	Big Noise	
May 3	Bad Religion	Age of Unreason	Punk rock	Epitaph	
May 3	Big Thief	U.F.O.F.	Indie rock, folk rock	4AD	
May 3	Filthy Friends	Emerald Valley		Kill Rock Stars	
May 3	Frank Carter & The Rattlesnakes	End of Suffering	Alternative rock, punk rock, indie rock	International Death Cult	
May 3	Joy Williams	Front Porch	Americana, folk-pop, country folk	Sensibility Music, The Orchard	
May 3	Judah & the Lion	Pep Talks		Caroline, Cletus the Van Records	
May 3	Kate Ceberano and Paul Grabowsky	Tryst	Jazz	ABC, Universal Australia	
May 3	L7	Scatter the Rats	Grunge	Blackheart	
May 3	Myrath	Shehili	Progressive metal, oriental metal, Arabic music	earMUSIC	
May 3	Pile	Green and Gray	Rock	Exploding in Sound	
May 3	Rhiannon Giddens and Francesco Turrisi	There Is No Other	Folk	Nonesuch	
May 3	Ruby Fields	Permanent Hermit		Ruby Fields	
May 3	Tacocat	This Mess Is a Place		Sub Pop	
May 3	Vampire Weekend	Father of the Bride	Indie rock, pop	Columbia	
May 3	The Wildhearts	Renaissance Men	Hard rock, heavy metal, punk rock	Graphite Records	
May 5	Sault	5	Funk, soul	Forever Living Originals	
May 8	Oh My Girl	The Fifth Season		WM	
May 8	Young Nudy and Pi'erre Bourne	Sli'merre	Hip-hop	RCA	
May 10	Aly & AJ	Sanctuary	Synth-pop, electropop	Aly & AJ Music LLC	
May 10	Bear Hands	Fake Tunes	Alternative rock, experimental rock, rap rock	Spensive Sounds	
May 10	Charly Bliss	Young Enough		Barsuk	
May 10	Christian Nodal	Ahora	Mariachi, norteño	Fonovisa, Universal México	
May 10	Ciara	Beauty Marks	Pop, R&B	Beauty Marks Entertainment	
May 10	Defeater	Defeater		Epitaph	
May 10	The Get Up Kids	Problems	Alternative rock, indie rock, emo	Polyvinyl	
May 10	Holly Herndon	Proto		4AD	
May 10	Howard Jones	Transform	Pop, synth-pop	D-tox	
May 10	James Bay	Oh My Messy Mind		Republic	
May 10	Jamila Woods	Legacy! Legacy!	Neo soul, R&B	Jagjaguwar	
May 10	Kian	Bliss		EMI Music Australia	
May 10	Lena d'Água	Desalmadamente		Universal Music Portugal	
May 10	Logic	Confessions of a Dangerous Mind	Hip-hop	Visionary, Def Jam	
May 10	Mac DeMarco	Here Comes the Cowboy	Indie rock	Mac's Record Label	
May 10	Michel Edelin Quintet with John Greaves	Echoes of Henry Cow	Avant-garde jazz	RogueArt	
May 10	Possessed	Revelations of Oblivion	Death metal, thrash metal	Nuclear Blast	
May 10	Rodney Atkins	Caught Up in the Country	Country	Curb	
May 10	The Rubens	MTV Unplugged		Ivy League	
May 10	Sammy Hagar and the Circle	Space Between	Hard rock	BMG	
May 10	Tanika Charles	The Gumption	Soul, R&B	Record Kicks	
May 10	Tim Hecker	Anoyo		Kranky	
May 10	Whitesnake	Flesh & Blood	Hard rock	Frontiers	
May 17	Alex Lahey	The Best of Luck Club		Nicky Boy Records, Caroline	
May 17	Biffy Clyro	Balance, Not Symmetry	Alternative rock	Warner Bros.	
May 17	Big Big Train	Grand Tour	Progressive rock	English Electric	
May 17	Brad Mehldau	Finding Gabriel		Nonesuch	
May 17	Carly Rae Jepsen	Dedicated	Pop, dance-pop, synth-pop	604, Schoolboy, Interscope	
May 17	Christone "Kingfish" Ingram	Kingfish	Blues	Alligator	
May 17	Com Truise	Persuasion System	Synthwave	Ghostly International	
May 17	Conrad Sewell	Life		300 Entertainment, Sony Music Australia	
May 17	Crooked Colours	Langata		Sweat It Out	
May 17	DJ Khaled	Father of Asahd	Hip-hop, R&B	We the Best, Epic	
May 17	Eleni Foureira	Gypsy Woman	Pop	Panik Records	
May 17	Frenship	Vacation			
May 17	Full of Hell	Weeping Choir	Grindcore, death metal, noise rock	Relapse	
May 17	The Heavy	Sons		BMG	
May 17	Injury Reserve	Injury Reserve	Hip-hop, experimental rap	Loma Vista	
May 17	Interpol	A Fine Mess	Indie rock, post-punk revival	Matador	
May 17	Kany García	Contra el Viento	Latin pop	Sony Music Latin	
May 17	Lewis Capaldi	Divinely Uninspired to a Hellish Extent	Pop, blue-eyed soul	Vertigo, Capitol	
May 17	Maluma	11:11		Sony Latin	
May 17	Margaret	Gaja Hornby	Urban pop	Artistars, Powerhouse	
May 17	Megan Thee Stallion	Fever	Hip-hop	300 Entertainment, 1501 Certified Ent.	
May 17	The National	I Am Easy to Find		4AD	
May 17	Nick Lowe	Love Starvation / Trombone	Rock, Americana	Yep Roc	
May 17	Rammstein	Untitled	Neue Deutsche Härte, industrial metal, electro-industrial	Universal	
May 17	Slowthai	Nothing Great About Britain	British hip-hop, political hip-hop, grime	Method Records	
May 17	Tyler, the Creator	Igor	Hip-hop, funk, R&B	Columbia	
May 17	Wu-Tang Clan	Wu-Tang: Of Mics and Men		Mass Appeal, 36 Chambers Records	
May 18	Glass Beach	The First Glass Beach Album	Indie rock, emo, art rock	Run for Cover	
May 20	Got7	Spinning Top	K-pop	JYP, Dreamus	
May 24	The Amazons	Future Dust	Alternative rock, psychedelic rock, hard rock	Fiction, Universal	
May 24	Amyl and the Sniffers	Amyl and the Sniffers	Pub rock, punk rock, garage rock	Flightless	
May 24	Black Mountain	Destroyer	Hard rock, neo-psychedelia, progressive rock	Dine Alone	
May 24	Cate Le Bon	Reward	Art pop, avant-pop	Mexican Summer	
May 24	Collie Buddz	Hybrid	Hip-hop, dancehall	Harper Digital	
May 24	Deathspell Omega	The Furnaces of Palingenesia	Black metal, avant-garde metal	Norma Evangelium Diaboli	
May 24	Earth	Full upon Her Burning Lips	Drone doom	Sargent House	
May 24	Faye Webster	Atlanta Millionaires Club	Folk pop, indie folk, alternative country	Secretly Canadian	
May 24	Flying Lotus	Flamagra	Jazz-funk, hip-hop, electronic	Warp	
May 24	Haku Collective	Hawaiian Lullaby	Hawaiian, folk, world	Haku Records	
May 24	Jai Waetford	Figure It Out		Sony Music Australia	
May 24	James Barker Band	Singles Only	Country	Universal Music Canada	
May 24	Marko Hietala	Mustan sydämen rovio	Hard rock, heavy metal, progressive rock	Nuclear Blast	
May 24	Mavis Staples	We Get By	R&B, soul	Anti-	
May 24	Hayden Thorpe	Diviner		Domino	
May 24	Melissa Aldana	Visions	Jazz	Motéma Music	
May 24	Middle Kids	New Songs for Old Problems		Domino	
May 24	Moneybagg Yo	43va Heartless	Hip-hop	CMG, BGE, Interscope	
May 24	Morrissey	California Son		Etienne, BMG	
May 24	Pronoun	I'll Show You Stronger		Rhyme & Reason Records	
May 24	Sebadoh	Act Surprised	Indie rock	Dangerbird	
May 24	Steve Lacy	Apollo XXI	Pop, R&B, funk	3qtr, AWAL	
May 24	Stray Cats	40	Rockabilly	Surfdog	
May 24	Suicideboys and Travis Barker	Live Fast Die Whenever			
May 24	Various artists	Rocketman: Music from the Motion Picture	Pop rock	Interscope, Virgin EMI	
May 24	Vicente García	Candela	Bachata, merengue, pop		
May 24	The Waterboys	Where the Action Is		Cooking Vinyl	
May 24	YG	4Real 4Real	Hip-hop, West Coast hip-hop	4Hunnid, Def Jam	
May 26	Batushka	Panihida	Black metal, church music	Sphieratz Productions	
May 27	Alice Caymmi	Electra	MPB, samba	Joia Moderna	
May 31	100 Gecs	1000 Gecs	Hyperpop, experimental	Dog Show Records	
May 31	AngelMaker	AngelMaker			
May 31	Darkthrone	Old Star	Black metal, heavy metal	Peaceville	
May 31	Death Angel	Humanicide	Thrash metal	Nuclear Blast	
May 31	Denzel Curry	Zuu	Hip-hop	Loma Vista	
May 31	Gabbie Hanna	2WayMirror		FrtyFve	
May 31	Inna	Yo		Global, Roc Nation	
May 31	ionnalee	Remember the Future	Electropop	To whom it may concern.	
May 31	Jim Cuddy	Countrywide Soul	Country rock	5 Corners Productions	
May 31	Jim Jones	El Capo	Hip-hop	Vamp Life, Roc Nation, Empire	
May 31	Jimmy Barnes	My Criminal Record		Bloodlines	
May 31	Kenny Wayne Shepherd Band	The Traveler		Provogue, Mascot Label	
May 31	The Lowest of the Low	Agitpop	Rock	Warner Music Canada	
May 31	Miley Cyrus	She Is Coming	Pop	RCA	
May 31	Richard Hawley	Further		BMG	
May 31	Royal Republic	Club Majesty	New wave, dance-punk, funk rock	Arising Empire, Nuclear Blast	
May 31	Sarah Connor	Herz Kraft Werke		Polydor	
May 31	Skepta	Ignorance Is Bliss	Grime, UK rap	Boy Better Know	
May 31	Sublime with Rome	Blessings	Ska, reggae, alternative rock	5 Music	
May 31	Texas Hippie Coalition	High in the Saddle	Heavy metal, southern metal, groove metal	Entertainment One	
May 31	Thomas Rhett	Center Point Road	Country, pop	Big Machine	

=== June ===
List of albums released in June 2019
Go to: January | February | March | April | May | June | July | August | September | October | November | December | Back to top
Release date	Artist	Album	Genre	Label	Ref.
June 3	Cazzu	Error 93	Latin trap, hip-hop	Rimas Entertainment	
June 4	WJSN	For the Summer	Electropop, disco, bubblegum pop	Starship	
June 5	Shonen Knife	Sweet Candy Power	Pop-punk, alternative rock	Good Charamel	
June 6	Avicii	Tim	Tropical house, progressive house	Avicii, Universal	
June 6	Vegyn	Text While Driving If You Want to Meet God!			
June 7	Aitana	Spoiler	Pop	Universal Music	
June 7	Aurora	A Different Kind of Human (Step 2)	Pop, art pop, electropop	Decca, Glassnote	
June 7	Boots Electric	Eagles of Death Metal Presents Boots Electric Performing the Best Songs We Never Wrote			
June 7	Cave In	Final Transmission	Alternative rock, alternative metal, post-hardcore	Hydra Head	
June 7	Combichrist	One Fire		Metropolis	
June 7	David Sánchez	Carib	Latin jazz	Ropeadope	
June 7	Dinosaur Pile-Up	Celebrity Mansions		Parlophone	
June 7	The Divine Comedy	Office Politics	Art pop	Divine Comedy	
June 7	Future	Save Me	Hip-hop	Epic, Freebandz	
June 7	Jambinai	Onda	Post-rock	Bella Union	
June 7	Jamie Cullum	Taller		Island	
June 7	Jonas Brothers	Happiness Begins	Pop	Republic	
June 7	Luke Combs	The Prequel		River House Artists, Columbia Nashville	
June 7	Mariee Sioux	Grief in Exile	Folk	Night Bloom Records	
June 7	Meg Mac	Hope		littleBIGMANrecords, EMI	
June 7	Motionless in White	Disguise	Metalcore, gothic metal, industrial metal	Roadrunner	
June 7	Nebula	Holy Shit	Stoner rock	Heavy Psych Sounds	
June 7	Pelican	Nighttime Stories	Post-metal	Southern Lord	
June 7	Perry Farrell	Kind Heaven	Rock	PerryEttyVS, BMG	
June 7	Polish Club	Iguana		Universal Music Australia	
June 7	Prince	Originals		NPG, Warner	
June 7	Santana	Africa Speaks	Latin rock	Concord, Suretone	
June 7	Silversun Pickups	Widow's Weeds	Indie rock, alternative rock	New Machine Recordings	
June 7	Stef Chura	Midnight		Saddle Creek	
June 7	Tyga	Legendary	Hip-hop, trap, R&B	Last Kings, Empire	
June 7	Xentrix	Bury the Pain	Thrash metal	Listenable Records	
June 7	Yeasayer	Erotic Reruns		Yeasayer Records	
June 12	GoldLink	Diaspora		RCA	
June 12	Mary's Blood	Confessions		Tokuma Japan Communications	
June 14	Bad Books	III	Indie folk, emo	Loma Vista	
June 14	Baroness	Gold & Grey	Progressive metal, space rock, post-rock	Abraxan Hymns	
June 14	Bastille	Doom Days	Electropop, new wave	Virgin EMI, Virgin, Universal	
June 14	Bill Callahan	Shepherd in a Sheepskin Vest		Drag City	
June 14	BlocBoy JB	I Am Me		Bloc Nation	
June 14	Bruce Springsteen	Western Stars	Roots rock, folk rock, country rock	Columbia	
June 14	Calexico and Iron & Wine	Years to Burn	Alternative rock	Sub Pop	
June 14	Cherry Poppin' Daddies	Bigger Life	Rock, ska punk, punk rock	Space Age Bachelor Pad Records	
June 14	Cory Wong	Live in the U.K.	Funk	Cory Wong	
June 14	Hayden James	Between Us	Electronic	Future Classic	
June 14	House and Land	Across the Field	Folk	Thrill Jockey	
June 14	Jordan Rakei	Origin	Neo soul, R&B	Ninja Tune	
June 14	Kae Tempest	The Book of Traps and Lessons	Spoken word	Fiction, American	
June 14	Keb' Mo'	Oklahoma	Blues, Americana	Concord	
June 14	The LaFontaines	Junior	Rock, hip-hop	So Recordings	
June 14	Lay	Honey	Hip-hop, R&B	SM, Zhang Yixing Studio	
June 14	Lil Keed	Long Live Mexico	Hip-hop, trap	300 Entertainment, YSL	
June 14	Lukas Nelson & Promise of the Real	Turn Off the News (Build a Garden)	Country rock	Fantasy	
June 14	Madonna	Madame X	Latin, trap, art pop	Interscope	
June 14	Neal Morse	Jesus Christ the Exorcist	Progressive rock	Frontiers	
June 14	Noah Kahan	Busyhead		Republic	
June 14	Stonefield	Bent	Psych-rock	Flightless	
June 14	Thank You Scientist	Terraformer	Progressive rock, progressive metal, jazz fusion	Evil Ink Records	
June 14	Timo Tolkki's Avalon	Return to Eden	Symphonic power metal	Frontiers	
June 14	X Ambassadors	Orion	Pop rock, alternative rock	Kidinakorner, Interscope	
June 14	Zhavia Ward	17	R&B, soul	Columbia, Sony Music	
June 17	SF9	RPM		FNC	
June 19	Red Velvet	The ReVe Festival: Day 1	K-pop, electropop	SM	
June 19	Stray Kids	Clé 2: Yellow Wood	Hip-hop, EDM, K-pop	JYP, Dreamus	
June 21	Benny the Butcher	The Plugs I Met	Hip-hop, mafioso rap	Black Soprano Family, Griselda	
June 21	Black Midi	Schlagenheim	Experimental rock, noise rock, post-hardcore	Rough Trade	
June 21	Black Pumas	Black Pumas	Psychedelic soul	ATO	
June 21	Bokassa	Crimson Riders	Stoner rock, hardcore punk	MVKA Music, Nuclear Blast	
June 21	Collective Soul	Blood	Alternative rock, post-grunge	Fuzze-Flex Records	
June 21	Fruit Bats	Gold Past Life	Indie rock, indie pop, indie folk	Merge	
June 21	Gucci Mane	Delusions of Grandeur	Hip-hop, trap	Atlantic, 1017	
June 21	Hatchie	Keepsake	Dream pop	Double Double Whammy, Ivy League, Heavenly	
June 21	Hot Chip	A Bath Full of Ecstasy	Synth-pop, alternative dance	Domino	
June 21	Lil Nas X	7	Pop, pop rock, trap	Columbia	
June 21	Mannequin Pussy	Patience	Punk rock	Epitaph	
June 21	Mark Ronson	Late Night Feelings	Pop	Sony Music	
June 21	The Raconteurs	Help Us Stranger	Blues rock, garage rock	Third Man	
June 21	SG Lewis	Dawn		Casablanca, Republic	
June 21	Titus Andronicus	An Obelisk		Merge	
June 21	Trina	The One	Hip-hop, R&B	Fast Life Entertainment, Rockstarr Music Group	
June 21	Two Door Cinema Club	False Alarm	Dance-pop, synth-pop	PIAS	
June 21	Will Young	Lexicon		Cooking Vinyl	
June 24	Chungha	Flourishing	K-pop	MNH, Stone Music	
June 26	Cynhn	Tablature		Imperial Records	
June 27	Eun Ji-won	G1	Hip-hop	YG	
June 27	Thom Yorke	Anima	Electronic	XL	
June 28	The Allman Betts Band	Down to the River	Southern rock	BMG	
June 28	Belinda O'Hooley	Inversions		No Masters	
June 28	Benee	Fire on Marzz	Pop	Republic	
June 28	The Black Keys	Let's Rock	Garage rock, blues rock	Easy Eye Sound, Nonesuch	
June 28	Chase Atlantic	Phases		BMG	
June 28	Chris Brown	Indigo	R&B, pop	RCA	
June 28	Daniel Caesar	Case Study 01	R&B	Golden Child Recordings	
June 28	Freddie Gibbs and Madlib	Bandana	Hip-hop, gangsta rap	ESGN, RCA, Keep Cool	
June 28	He Is Legend	White Bat		Spinefarm	
June 28	Ingrid Michaelson	Stranger Songs		Cabin 24	
June 28	Julia Michaels	Inner Monologue Part 2	Pop	Republic	
June 28	Kim Petras	Clarity	Bubblegum pop, hip-hop, R&B	BunHead Records	
June 28	Molly	All That Ever Could Have Been	Dream pop, post-rock, shoegaze	Sonic Cathedral	
June 28	Mustard	Perfect Ten	Hip-hop	10 Summers, Interscope	
June 28	Poppy	Choke	Electropop, synth-pop, nu metal	Mad Decent, I'm Poppy	
June 28	Prince Daddy & The Hyena	Cosmic Thrill Seekers	Indie rock, pop-punk, emo pop	Counter Intuitive	
June 28	Various artists	Woodstock – Back to the Garden: 50th Anniversary Experience	Rock	Rhino	
June 29	Various artists	Kolateral	OPM, Pinoy hip-hop, political hip-hop	NOFACE Records	

== Third quarter ==
=== July ===
List of albums released in July 2019
Go to: January | February | March | April | May | June | July | August | September | October | November | December | Back to top
Release date	Artist	Album	Genre	Label	Ref.
July 1	Gandalf's Fist	The Clockwork Prologue			
July 1	GFriend	Fever Season	K-pop	Source, kakao M	
July 3	Bish	Carrots and Sticks	Punk rock, pop-punk, alternative rock	Avex Trax	
July 3	Marshmello	Joytime III		Joytime Collective	
July 5	Abbath	Outstrider	Black metal	Season of Mist	
July 5	Brand of Sacrifice	God Hand		Unique Leader Records	
July 5	Félicia Atkinson	The Flower and the Vessel	Experimental	Shelter Press	
July 5	Jaden Smith	Erys	Hip-hop, trap, emo rap	MSFTSMusic, Roc Nation, Republic	
July 5	Jesca Hoop	Stonechild	Alternative rock	Memphis Industries	
July 5	Jipsta	Swaggerific	Hip-hop	Bandoozle Beatz	
July 5	Machine Gun Kelly	Hotel Diablo	Hip-hop, rap rock	Bad Boy, Interscope	
July 5	Olympia	Flamingo	Indie pop, synth-pop	EMI, Universal Australia	
July 5	Various artists	Revenge of the Dreamers III	Hip-hop, R&B	Dreamville, Interscope	
July 10	Bump of Chicken	Aurora Arc	J-pop	Toy's Factory	
July 10	Masaki Suda	Love		Epic Japan	
July 12	311	Voyager	Alternative rock, rap rock, reggae rock	BMG	
July 12	Allday	Starry Night Over the Phone	Australian hip-hop, alternative hip-hop, indie pop	OneTwo	
July 12	Angie Stone	Full Circle		Conjunction Entertainment, Cleopatra Records	
July 12	Banks	III	Goth-pop	Harvest	
July 12	Batushka	Hospodi	Black metal, doom metal	Metal Blade	
July 12	Big K.R.I.T.	K.R.I.T. Iz Here	Southern hip-hop	BMG, Multi Alumni	
July 12	Bleached	Don't You Think You've Had Enough?	Funk rock, post-punk, pop rock	Dead Oceans	
July 12	Blood Orange	Angel's Pulse		Domino	
July 12	Dope Lemon	Smooth Big Cat		EMI Australia	
July 12	Ed Sheeran	No.6 Collaborations Project	Pop, R&B, hip-hop	Asylum, Atlantic	
July 12	Glitterer	Looking Through the Shades		Anti-	
July 12	Imperial Teen	Now We Are Timeless		Merge	
July 12	Joanna Sternberg	Then I Try Some More		Fat Possum	
July 12	K.Flay	Solutions		Interscope, Night Street Records	
July 12	Kool Keith	Keith	Alternative hip-hop	Mello Music Group	
July 12	Mr. Muthafuckin' eXquire	Mr. Muthafuckin' eXquire	Hip-hop	Chocolate Rabbit, Soulspazm	
July 12	Oh, Sleeper	Bloodied / Unbowed	Metalcore	Solid State	
July 12	Purple Mountains	Purple Mountains	Indie rock, country	Drag City	
July 12	Shindy	Drama		Friends with Money	
July 12	Thelma Plum	Better in Blak		Warner Music Australasia	
July 12	Tijuana Panthers	Carpet Denim	Garage rock, surf rock, indie rock	Innovative Leisure	
July 12	Torche	Admission	Stoner metal, sludge metal, shoegaze	Relapse	
July 12	Yuna	Rouge	Pop, R&B	Verve Forecast, Universal	
July 17	Dorian Electra	Flamboyant	Experimental pop, electropop, hyperpop	Dorian Electra	
July 19	Ada Lea	What We Say in Private	Indie rock	Saddle Creek	
July 19	Beyoncé and various artists	The Lion King: The Gift	R&B, Afrobeats, hip-hop	Parkwood, Columbia	
July 19	Elevation Worship	Aleluya (En La Tierra)	Worship, Latin	Elevation Worship	
July 19	Freya Ridings	Freya Ridings		Good Soldier Songs, AWAL	
July 19	Hippo Campus	Demos II		Grand Jury Music	
July 19	Ider	Emotional Education	Pop rock, alternative rock	Glassnote	
July 19	Iggy Azalea	In My Defense	Hip-hop	Bad Dreams, Empire	
July 19	Jacob Collier	Djesse Vol. 2	Jazz	Hajanga Records, Decca, Geffen	
July 19	Lingua Ignota	Caligula	Neoclassical dark wave, classical, noise	Profound Lore	
July 19	Maxo Kream	Brandon Banks	Trap	Big Persona, 88 Classic, RCA	
July 19	Peppa Pig	My First Album	Children's music	eOne	
July 19	Sabaton	The Great War	Power metal	Nuclear Blast	
July 19	Sabrina Carpenter	Singular: Act II	Pop, dance-pop, R&B	Hollywood	
July 19	Scott Stapp	The Space Between the Shadows	Post-grunge, hard rock, alternative metal	Napalm	
July 19	Slaves	The Velvet Ditch	Punk rock, hardcore punk	Virgin EMI	
July 19	Sum 41	Order in Decline	Heavy metal, punk rock, melodic hardcore	Hopeless	
July 19	Tony Molina	Songs from San Mateo County	Power pop	Smoking Room Records	
July 19	Willow	Willow	Dream pop, psychedelic folk, psychedelic soul	MSFTSMusic, Roc Nation	
July 26	Andy Grammer	Naive		S-Curve, BMG	
July 26	Angie McMahon	Salt		Dualtone, AWAL	
July 26	BJ the Chicago Kid	1123	R&B	Motown	
July 26	Burna Boy	African Giant	Afrobeats, Afrobeat, dancehall	Spaceship Entertainment, Atlantic, Warner	
July 26	Chance the Rapper	The Big Day	Hip-hop, pop-rap, gospel rap	Chance the Rapper	
July 26	Cordae	The Lost Boy	Hip-hop, neo soul	Atlantic	
July 26	Cuco	Para Mi	Indie pop, rock	Interscope	
July 26	Death Before Dishonor	Unfinished Business	Hardcore punk	Bridge 9	
July 26	Delbert McClinton	Tall, Dark, and Handsome	Blues	Hot Shot Records	
July 26	DJ Snake	Carte Blanche		Geffen	
July 26	Florist	Emily Alone		Double Double Whammy	
July 26	Justin Moore	Late Nights and Longnecks	Country	Valory	
July 26	Kaiser Chiefs	Duck		Polydor	
July 26	Key Glock and Young Dolph	Dum and Dummer	Hip-hop, trap	Paper Route Empire	
July 26	Lena Katina	Mono		Katina Music Inc.	
July 26	Mini Mansions	Guy Walks into a Bar...		Fiction	
July 26	NF	The Search	Hip-hop	NF Real Music LLC, Caroline	
July 26	Of Monsters and Men	Fever Dream	Electronica, indie folk, stadium rock	Republic	
July 26	Proper	I Spent the Winter Writing Songs About Getting Better		Big Scary Monsters	
July 26	Rich Brian	The Sailor	Alternative hip-hop	88rising, 12Tone Music	
July 26	Thy Art Is Murder	Human Target	Deathcore	Nuclear Blast, Human Warfare	
July 26	Violent Femmes	Hotel Last Resort	Alternative rock	PIAS	

=== August ===
List of albums released in August 2019
Go to: January | February | March | April | May | June | July | August | September | October | November | December | Back to top
Release date	Artist	Album	Genre	Label	Ref.
August 1	Black Dresses	Love and Affection for Stupid Little Bitches			
August 1	Russian Circles	Blood Year	Post-metal, instrumental rock, post-rock	Sargent House	
August 2	Bad Omens	Finding God Before God Finds Me	Alternative metal, metalcore	Sumerian	
August 2	Carnifex	World War X	Deathcore, atmospheric black metal	Nuclear Blast	
August 2	Clairo	Immunity	Soft rock, bedroom pop, electropop	Fader	
August 2	Cory Wong	Motivational Music for the Syncopated Soul		Cory Wong	
August 2	Creedence Clearwater Revival	Live at Woodstock	Swamp rock	Craft, Fantasy	
August 2	Holy Holy	My Own Pool of Light		Wonderlick, Sony Music Australia	
August 2	Mabel	High Expectations	Pop, R&B	Polydor	
August 2	Northlane	Alien	Metalcore, progressive metal, alternative metal	UNFD, Rise	
August 2	Skillet	Victorious	Christian rock, hard rock	Atlantic	
August 2	The Teskey Brothers	Run Home Slow		Half Mile Harvest Recordings, Decca, Ivy League	
August 2	Ty Segall	First Taste	Garage rock	Drag City	
August 2	Tyler Childers	Country Squire	Country	Hickman Holler, RCA	
August 2	Volbeat	Rewind, Replay, Rebound	Hard rock, rockabilly, heavy metal	Vertigo, Republic, Universal	
August 7	Hiroko Moriguchi	Gundam Song Covers	J-pop, jazz, anison	King	
August 9	Bon Iver	I, I	Chamber folk, experimental, folktronica	Jagjaguwar	
August 9	Dirty Heads	Super Moon		Five Seven	
August 9	Electric Youth	Memory Emotion	Synth-pop, alternative pop	Last Gang, Watts Arcade Inc.	
August 9	G&D (Georgia Anne Muldrow and Dudley Perkins)	Black Love and War	Hip-hop	SomeOthaShip, eOne	
August 9	Gina Jeffreys	Beautiful Tangle		Sonic Timber Records	
August 9	Half Alive	Now, Not Yet	Pop	RCA	
August 9	Marika Hackman	Any Human Friend	Indie rock	AMF Records, Virgin EMI, Sub Pop	
August 9	Pete Yorn	Caretakers	Alternative rock, indie rock	Shelly Music	
August 9	The Regrettes	How Do You Love？	Punk rock, riot grrrl	Warner	
August 9	Rick Ross	Port of Miami 2	Hip-hop	Maybach Music, Epic	
August 9	Safia	Story's Start or End	Electronic	Parlophone, Warner Music Australasia	
August 9	Slipknot	We Are Not Your Kind	Nu metal, alternative metal, groove metal	Roadrunner	
August 9	Strung Out	Songs of Armor and Devotion	Punk metal, melodic hardcore, hardcore punk	Fat Wreck Chords	
August 9	Tori Kelly	Inspired by True Events	R&B	Capitol, School Boy	
August 9	Trippie Redd	!	Emo rap	TenThousand Projects, Caroline	
August 9	Ufo361	Wave		Stay High	
August 9	Why?	AOKOHIO	Indie rock	Joyful Noise	
August 14	Noah	Keterkaitan Keterikatan	Pop	Musica Studio's	
August 16	Blanck Mass	Animated Violence Mild		Sacred Bones	
August 16	Bobby Rush	Sitting on Top of the Blues	Blues	Deep Rush	
August 16	Fletcher	You Ruined New York City for Me		Capitol	
August 16	Frank Turner	No Man's Land	Folk punk, folk rock	Xtra Mile, Polydor	
August 16	Friendly Fires	Inflorescent	Indie pop, dance-pop	Polydor	
August 16	HammerFall	Dominion	Heavy metal, power metal	Napalm	
August 16	Ho99o9	Cyber Warfare			
August 16	The Hold Steady	Thrashing Thru the Passion	Indie rock, alternative rock, heartland rock	Frenchkiss	
August 16	Hunter Hayes	Wild Blue (Part I)	Country pop, pop rock, R&B	Warner Music Nashville	
August 16	Illenium	Ascend	Future bass, rock, dance-pop	Astralwerks	
August 16	Killswitch Engage	Atonement	Metalcore	Metal Blade	
August 16	King Gizzard & the Lizard Wizard	Infest the Rats' Nest	Thrash metal	Flightless	
August 16	Mallory Knox	Mallory Knox		A Wolf At Your Door Records	
August 16	The Murder Capital	When I Have Fears	Post-punk	Human Season Records	
August 16	Oh Sees	Face Stabber	Progressive rock, psychedelic rock	Castle Face	
August 16	Pets Tseng	Confession	Mandopop	AsiaMuse Entertainment	
August 16	Ride	This Is Not a Safe Place	Post-punk, shoegaze, indie rock	Wichita, PIAS	
August 16	Shadow of Intent	Melancholy	Blackened death metal, deathcore, symphonic death metal		
August 16	Shura	Forevher	Electropop, pop	Secretly Canadian	
August 16	Sleater-Kinney	The Center Won't Hold	Punk rock, post-punk, industrial rock	Mom + Pop	
August 16	Snoop Dogg	I Wanna Thank Me	West Coast hip-hop	Empire, Doggy Style	
August 16	Twilight Force	Dawn of the Dragonstar	Symphonic power metal	Nuclear Blast	
August 16	Young Thug	So Much Fun	Hip-hop, trap	300, Atlantic	
August 19	The Boyz	Dreamlike	Dance	IST Entertainment	
August 20	Little Brother	May the Lord Watch		Imagine Nation, For Members Only, Empire	
August 20	Red Velvet	The ReVe Festival: Day 2	K-pop	SM	
August 22	Up10tion	The Moment of Illusion	K-pop, dance	TOP Media	
August 23	Alexander Tucker	Guild of the Asbestos Weaver	Avant-pop	Thrill Jockey	
August 23	Brockhampton	Ginger	Alternative R&B, pop rap	Question Everything Inc., RCA	
August 23	Ceremony	In the Spirit World Now	Post-punk, new wave	Relapse	
August 23	Jay Som	Anak Ko		Polyvinyl	
August 23	Jeezy	TM104: The Legend of the Snowman	Hip-hop	YJ Music, Inc., Def Jam	
August 23	Jidenna	85 to Africa	Hip-hop, Afrobeats	Wondaland, Epic	
August 23	Knocked Loose	A Different Shade of Blue	Metalcore, heavy hardcore, sludge metal	Pure Noise	
August 23	Missy Elliott	Iconology	Pop, hip-hop, R&B	Atlantic	
August 23	New Model Army	From Here	Rock	Attack Attack Records, EarMusic	
August 23	Obie Trice	The Fifth		Black Market Entertainment	
August 23	Raphael Saadiq	Jimmy Lee	R&B, soul, neo soul	Columbia	
August 23	Rapsody	Eve	Hip-hop	Roc Nation	
August 23	Redd Kross	Beyond the Door	Alternative rock	Merge	
August 23	Sacred Reich	Awakening	Thrash metal	Metal Blade	
August 23	Sheer Mag	A Distant Call	Heavy metal, power pop, punk rock	Wilsuns Recording Company	
August 23	Tanya Tucker	While I'm Livin'	Country	Fantasy	
August 23	Taylor Swift	Lover	Electropop, pop rock, synth-pop	Republic	
August 23	Tropical Fuck Storm	Braindrops	Art rock, psychedelic rock, noise rock	Flightless, Joyful Noise	
August 23	Vince Gill	Okie	Country	MCA Nashville	
August 23	Waax	Big Grief	Alternative rock, punk rock	Dew Process	
August 28	Coldrain	The Side Effects	Post-hardcore, alternative rock, nu metal	Warner Music	
August 30	!!!	Wallop		Warp	
August 30	Ash Grunwald	Mojo		Bloodlines Music	
August 30	Black Belt Eagle Scout	At the Party with My Brown Friends	Indie rock	Saddle Creek	
August 30	Caravan Palace	Chronologic		Lone Diggers, Le Plan Recordings	
August 30	Common	Let Love	Hip-hop	Loma Vista, Concord	
August 30	Ezra Furman	Twelve Nudes		Bella Union	
August 30	The Futureheads	Powers		Nul	
August 30	G Flip	About Us	Indie rock, pop	Future Classic	
August 30	HTRK	Venus in Leo		Ghostly International	
August 30	Joan Shelley	Like the River Loves the Sea	Country, folk	No Quarter Records	
August 30	Kano	Hoodies All Summer	British hip-hop, grime	Parlophone, Bigger Picture Music	
August 30	Lana Del Rey	Norman Fucking Rockwell!	Soft rock, psychedelic rock, pop	Polydor, Interscope	
August 30	Lil Tecca	We Love You Tecca	Hip-hop	Galactic Records, Republic	
August 30	The McClures	The Way Home	Contemporary worship	Bethel Music	
August 30	Montaigne	Complex		Wonderlick, Sony Music Australia	
August 30	Natasha Bedingfield	Roll with Me	Pop, reggae, R&B	We Are Hear, Universal	
August 30	Pharmakon	Devour		Sacred Bones	
August 30	Ronnie Penque	Family Business	Rock	Bayland Records	
August 30	Sheryl Crow	Threads	Heartland rock, country rock, folk rock	Big Machine	
August 30	Sir	Chasing Summer	R&B, neo soul	Top Dawg, RCA	
August 30	Tarja	In the Raw	Symphonic metal	earMUSIC	
August 30	Tones and I	The Kids Are Coming		Bad Batch Records, Sony Music Australia	
August 30	Tool	Fear Inoculum	Progressive rock, progressive metal, alternative metal	Tool Dissectional, Volcano, RCA	
August 30	Trisha Yearwood	Every Girl	Country	Gwendolyn Records	
August 30	Wage War	Pressure	Metalcore	Fearless	
August 30	Wallace Roney	Blue Dawn-Blue Nights	Jazz	HighNote	

=== September ===
List of albums released in September 2019
Go to: January | February | March | April | May | June | July | August | September | October | November | December | Back to top
Release date	Artist	Album	Genre	Label	Ref.
September 4	Pasocom Music Club	Night Flow			
September 6	The Allman Brothers Band	Fillmore West '71	Blues rock	Allman Brothers Band Recording Company	
September 6	Bat for Lashes	Lost Girls	Synth-pop	Bat for Lashes, AWAL	
September 6	Björk, Fever Ray and The Knife	Country Creatures	Industrial	One Little Indian	
September 6	Black Star Riders	Another State of Grace		Nuclear Blast	
September 6	Chrissie Hynde	Valve Bone Woe	Jazz	BMG	
September 6	EarthGang	Mirrorland		Dreamville, Interscope, Spillage Village	
September 6	Frankie Cosmos	Close It Quietly	Indie pop	Sub Pop	
September 6	Flor	Ley Lines		Fueled by Ramen	
September 6	Ghostface Killah	Ghostface Killahs	Hip-hop	Now Generation Music Corporation	
September 6	Grayscale	Nella Vita		Fearless	
September 6	The Highwomen	The Highwomen	Country	Elektra	
September 6	Home Free	Dive Bar Saints		Home Free Records	
September 6	Iggy Pop	Free	Ambient, jazz	Caroline, Loma Vista	
September 6	Jax Jones	Snacks (Supersize)		Polydor, Universal	
September 6	Lindsey Stirling	Artemis		Lindseystomp, BMG	
September 6	Mallrat	Driving Music		Dew Process, Universal Australia	
September 6	Melanie Martinez	K–12	Alternative pop	Atlantic	
September 6	The Messthetics	Anthropocosmic Nest	Experimental rock, progressive rock, art punk	Dischord	
September 6	Muna	Saves the World	Indie pop, synth-pop, electropop	RCA	
September 6	Post Malone	Hollywood's Bleeding	Hip-hop, pop	Republic	
September 6	Rheostatics	Here Come the Wolves	Indie rock	Six Shooter	
September 6	Rüfüs Du Sol	Solace Remixed		Rose Avenue	
September 6	Sleeping with Sirens	How It Feels to Be Lost	Post-hardcore	Sumerian	
September 6	Sonata Arctica	Talviyö	Power metal	Nuclear Blast	
September 6	Status Quo	Backbone	Rock	earMusic, Fourth Chord Records	
September 6	Tinariwen	Amadjar	African blues, world	Anti-, Epitaph	
September 9	Pernice Brothers	Spread the Feeling		Ashmont Records	
September 10	Bolbbalgan4	Two Five		Shofar Music	
September 11	Infant Annihilator	The Battle of Yaldabaoth		Infant Annihilator	
September 11	Lyrical School	Be Kind Rewind		Victor Entertainment	
September 11	María Becerra	222		300	
September 13	Ahmad Jamal	Ballades	Jazz	Jazz Village	
September 13	Alasdair Roberts	The Fiery Margin		Drag City	
September 13	Alex Cameron	Miami Memory	Soft rock, heartland rock, synth-pop	Secretly Canadian	
September 13	Belle and Sebastian	Days of the Bagnold Summer		Matador	
September 13	The Belonging Co	Awe + Wonder	Contemporary worship music	TBCO Music	
September 13	Charli XCX	Charli	Avant-pop, electropop	Asylum, Atlantic UK	
September 13	Chelsea Wolfe	Birth of Violence	Folk	Sargent House	
September 13	Cold	The Things We Can't Stop		Napalm	
September 13	Devendra Banhart	Ma		Nonesuch	
September 13	Emeli Sandé	Real Life	Gospel soul	Virgin EMI	
September 13	Goo Goo Dolls	Miracle Pill		Warner	
September 13	Hardy	Hixtape, Vol. 1	Country	Big Loud, Tree Vibez	
September 13	Hobo Johnson	The Fall of Hobo Johnson	Rap, spoken word	Warner	
September 13	The Hu	The Gereg	Folk metal	Eleven Seven	
September 13	Jenny Hval	The Practice of Love	Electropop, trance, darkwave	Sacred Bones	
September 13	Joseph	Good Luck, Kid		ATO	
September 13	JPEGMafia	All My Heroes Are Cornballs	Punk rap, experimental hip-hop	EQT Recordings	
September 13	Korn	The Nothing	Nu metal	Roadrunner, Elektra	
September 13	KXM	Circle of Dolls		Rat Pak Records, Frontiers	
September 13	The Lumineers	III	Folk	Dualtone, Decca	
September 13	Metronomy	Metronomy Forever	Indietronica	Because	
September 13	Microwave	Death Is a Warm Blanket		Pure Noise	
September 13	Mike Patton and Jean-Claude Vannier	Corpse Flower	Art pop, lounge	Ipecac	
September 13	Paula Cole	Revolution		675 Records	
September 13	Pixies	Beneath the Eyrie	Indie rock	BMG, Infectious	
September 13	PSOTY	Sunless	Post-metal	Candlelight, Spinefarm	
September 13	Puddle of Mudd	Welcome to Galvania	Alternative metal	Pavement Entertainment	
September 13	Ruel	Free Time		RCA, Sony Music Australia	
September 13	Sam Fender	Hypersonic Missiles	Heartland rock	Polydor	
September 13	Sampa the Great	The Return	Hip-hop, R&B	Ninja Tune	
September 13	(Sandy) Alex G	House of Sugar	Indie pop, experimental pop	Domino	
September 13	Shawn Colvin	Steady On: 30th Anniversary Acoustic Edition		SLC Recordings	
September 13	Starset	Divisions	Hard rock	Fearless	
September 13	Tiger Army	Retrofuture		Rise	
September 13	Tiny Moving Parts	Breathe	Math rock, pop-punk, emo revival	Hopeless	
September 13	Void of Vision	Hyperdaze	Metalcore	UNFD	
September 13	War of Ages	Void	Metalcore	Facedown	
September 16	DJ Newtown	West Members		Maltine Records, HIHATT	
September 16	Seventeen	An Ode	K-pop	Pledis	
September 17	Slayyyter	Slayyyter		Slayyyter Records	
September 18	Dreamcatcher	Raid of Dream		Dreamcatcher Company	
September 19	Laboum	Two of Us			
September 20	Amaia	Pero No Pasa Nada		Universal Music	
September 20	As I Lay Dying	Shaped by Fire		Nuclear Blast	
September 20	Blink-182	Nine	Pop-punk, pop rock	Columbia	
September 20	Brittany Howard	Jaime	Synth-rock	ATO	
September 20	Cashmere Cat	Princess Catgirl		Interscope	
September 20	Chastity Belt	Chastity Belt		Hardly Art	
September 20	Colt Ford	We the People, Volume 1	Country rap	Average Joes	
September 20	Cult of Luna	A Dawn to Fear	Progressive metal, post-metal	Metal Blade	
September 20	Del Barber	Easy Keeper		Acronym Records	
September 20	Efterklang	Altid Sammen		4AD, Rumraket	
September 20	Ethan Iverson Quartet	Common Practice	Jazz	ECM	
September 20	Fitz and the Tantrums	All the Feels	Pop	Elektra	
September 20	Fly Pan Am	C'est ça	Post-rock, experimental rock	Constellation	
September 20	Jeanette Biedermann	DNA		Columbia	
September 20	Keane	Cause and Effect		Island	
September 20	King Von	Grandson, Vol. 1		Only the Family, Empire	
September 20	Kobra and the Lotus	Evolution	Heavy metal, hard rock	Napalm	
September 20	Liam Gallagher	Why Me? Why Not.	Alternative rock, hard rock, pop rock	Warner	
September 20	Loraine James	For You and I		Hyperdub	
September 20	M83	DSVII		Naïve, Mute	
September 20	Mudhoney	Morning in America	Alternative rock, garage rock	Sub Pop	
September 20	Reid Anderson, Dave King, and Craig Taborn	Golden Valley Is Now	Jazz, electronic	Intakt	
September 20	Riley Green	Different 'Round Here	Country	BMLG	
September 20	Samantha Fish	Kill or Be Kind		Rounder	
September 20	Tove Lo	Sunshine Kitty	Electropop	Universal	
September 20	Vivian Girls	Memory		Polyvinyl	
September 20	Zac Brown Band	The Owl	Pop, EDM, country	BMG, BBR, Wheelhouse Records	
September 21	Thurston Moore	Spirit Counsel	Avant-garde, rock	The Daydream Library Series	
September 23	Twice	Feel Special	Pop	JYP	
September 27	Automatic	Signal		Stones Throw	
September 27	Beth Hart	War in My Mind		Provogue, Mascot Label Group	
September 27	Billy Strings	Home		Rounder	
September 27	Boy & Bear	Suck on Light		Island Australia, Universal Australia	
September 27	Busby Marou	The Great Divide		Warner Music Australasia	
September 27	DaBaby	Kirk	Hip-hop, trap	Interscope, Billion Dollar Baby	
September 27	Dove Cameron	Bloodshot / Waste	Pop	Disruptor	
September 27	DragonForce	Extreme Power Metal	Power metal, speed metal	earMUSIC, Metal Blade, JVC Victor	
September 27	Drax Project	Drax Project	Pop	Drax Project Limited, Universal	
September 27	The Early November	Lilac		Rise	
September 27	Grateful Dead	Saint of Circumstance	Rock	Rhino	
September 27	Hellyeah	Welcome Home	Groove metal, alternative metal	Eleven Seven	
September 27	Hermitude	Pollyanarchy		Elefant Traks	
September 27	IQ	Resistance		Giant Electric Pea	
September 27	Jacky Terrasson	53	Jazz	Blue Note	
September 27	Jon Pardi	Heartache Medication	Neotraditional country	Capitol Nashville	
September 27	Kevin Gates	I'm Him	Hip-hop	Atlantic Records, Bread Winners' Association	
September 27	KMFDM	Paradise		Metropolis, KMFDM	
September 27	Kristin Chenoweth	For the Girls	Vocal pop, jazz, country	Concord	
September 27	Love Fame Tragedy	I Don't Want to Play the Victim, But I'm Really Good at It		Good Soldier Records, AWAL	
September 27	Magnapop	The Circle Is Round	Alternative rock, pop-punk	Happy Happy Birthday to Me	
September 27	Mão Morta	No Fim Era o Frio		Rastilho Records	
September 27	Michaela Anne	Desert Dove		Yep Roc	
September 27	The New Pornographers	In the Morse Code of Brake Lights		Concord Music	
September 27	Of Mice & Men	Earthandsky	Metalcore, melodic metalcore, hard rock	Rise	
September 27	Opeth	In Cauda Venenum	Progressive metal, progressive rock	Moderbolaget, Nuclear Blast	
September 27	Pitbull	Libertad 548		Mr. 305	
September 27	Push Baby	Woah		School Boy, Republic	
September 27	Sault	7	Rhythm and blues	Forever Living Originals	
September 27	Steel Panther	Heavy Metal Rules	Glam metal, comedy rock	Steel Panther Inc.	
September 27	Sturgill Simpson	Sound & Fury	Blues rock	Elektra	
September 27	Telefon Tel Aviv	Dreams Are Not Enough	Electronic	Ghostly International	
September 27	Temples	Hot Motion		ATO	
September 27	Tegan and Sara	Hey, I'm Just Like You	Synth-pop, pop rock, indie rock	Sire	
September 30	Oneus	Fly with Us		RBW	
September 30	Zico	Thinking Part.1		KOZ Entertainment	

== Fourth quarter ==
=== October ===
List of albums released in October 2019
Go to: January | February | March | April | May | June | July | August | September | October | November | December | Back to top
Release date	Artist	Album	Genre	Label	Ref.
October 1	Chen	Dear My Dear	Pop, ballad	SM	
October 1	Kim Petras	Turn Off the Light	Electropop, dance-pop, industrial techno	BunHead Records	
October 2	Chromatics	Closer to Grey		Italians Do It Better	
October 2	Mrs. Green Apple	Attitude		EMI	
October 3	Robert Glasper	Fuck Yo Feelings	Jazz rap	Loma Vista	
October 4	Akon	El Negreeto	Reggaeton, bachata, merengue	Akonik Label Group	
October 4	Angel Olsen	All Mirrors	Art pop	Jagjaguwar	
October 4	The Avett Brothers	Closer Than Together		American, Republic	
October 4	Bayside	Interrobang	Post-hardcore, emo, alternative metal	Hopeless	
October 4	Bill Frisell	Harmony	Jazz	Blue Note	
October 4	Brantley Gilbert	Fire & Brimstone	Country rock	Valory	
October 4	Capital Bra and Samra	Berlin lebt 2		Urban Legends, Bra Music	
October 4	City and Colour	A Pill for Loneliness	Alternative rock, indie rock, folk rock	Still Records	
October 4	Danny Brown	UKnoWhatImSayin?	Hip-hop	Warp	
October 4	The Darkness	Easter Is Cancelled		Canary Dwarf, Cooking Vinyl	
October 4	Dermot Kennedy	Without Fear	Folk-pop	Riggins Recording, Interscope, Island	
October 4	DIIV	Deceiver	Shoegaze, grunge, slowcore	Captured Tracks	
October 4	Flying Colors	Third Degree		Music Theories Recordings, Mascot	
October 4	Insomnium	Heart Like a Grave	Melodic death metal	Century	
October 4	Issues	Beautiful Oblivion	Nu metal, pop, R&B	Rise	
October 4	Joshua Redman and Brooklyn Rider	Sun on Sand	Jazz	Nonesuch	
October 4	King Calaway	Rivers		Stoney Creek	
October 4	Lagwagon	Railer	Skate punk	Fat Wreck Chords	
October 4	Lapalux	Amnioverse		Brainfeeder	
October 4	Larissa Manoela	Além do Tempo	Pop, EDM	Deckdisc	
October 4	Los Lobos	Llegó Navidad		Rhino Records	
October 4	Lost Frequencies	Alive and Feeling Fine		Found Frequencies, Mostiko Records, Armada	
October 4	Maisie Peters	It's Your Bed Babe, It's Your Funeral		Atlantic	
October 4	The Menzingers	Hello Exile	Heartland rock, punk rock	Epitaph	
October 4	Mika	My Name Is Michael Holbrook	Pop	Republic, Casablanca	
October 4	Nick Cave and the Bad Seeds	Ghosteen	Ambient, electronic	Ghosteen, Bad Seed	
October 4	San Fermin	The Cormorant I		Better Company, Sony Music	
October 4	Summer Walker	Over It	R&B	Love Renaissance, Interscope	
October 4	Swim Deep	Emerald Classics		Pop Committee, Cooking Vinyl	
October 4	That Dog	Old LP	Alternative rock, indie rock, pop-punk	UMe	
October 4	Toxic Holocaust	Primal Future: 2019	Thrash metal	E1 Music	
October 4	Wilco	Ode to Joy	Folk rock	dBpm	
October 7	AB6IX	6ixense	K-pop	Brand New	
October 8	Babymetal	Metal Galaxy	Kawaii metal	BMD Fox, Toy's Factory, Amuse Inc.	
October 9	Mike Posner	Keep Going		Island	
October 9	Official Hige Dandism	Traveler		Pony Canyon	
October 11	88rising	Head in the Clouds II		88rising Records, 12Tone Music	
October 11	Allah-Las	Lahs	Psychedelic pop, surf rock, experimental rock	Mexican Summer	
October 11	Aṣa	Lucid	Soul, folk, rock	Chapter Two Records, Wagram Music	
October 11	Big Thief	Two Hands		4AD	
October 11	Blanco Brown	Honeysuckle & Lightning Bugs	Country rap, trap	TrailerTrapMusic, BMG	
October 11	Blue Hawaii	Open Reduction Internal Fixation		Arbutus	
October 11	Chris Farren	Born Hot	Indie pop	Polyvinyl	
October 11	Comet Gain	Fireraisers Forever!		Tapete	
October 11	Cursive	Get Fixed		15 Passenger	
October 11	The Dead South	Sugar & Joy		Six Shooter	
October 11	The Devil Wears Prada	The Act	Metalcore, indie rock, hard rock	Solid State	
October 11	Elbow	Giants of All Sizes		Polydor	
October 11	Hillsong Worship	Awake	Contemporary worship	Hillsong Music	
October 11	Kim Gordon	No Home Record	Industrial, electro rock, art punk	Matador	
October 11	Lacuna Coil	Black Anima	Gothic metal, metalcore, nu metal	Century Media, RED Music	
October 11	Lightning Bolt	Sonic Citadel	Noise rock	Thrill Jockey	
October 11	Lil' Kim	9	Hip-hop, trap	Queen Bee, eOne	
October 11	Lil Tjay	True 2 Myself	Hip-hop, trap, R&B	Columbia	
October 11	Richard Dawson	2020		Weird World	
October 11	Signs of the Swarm	Vital Deprivation		Unique Leader Records	
October 11	Spyro Gyra	Vinyl Tap		Amherst Records	
October 11	Starcrawler	Devour You	Alternative rock, punk rock	Rough Trade	
October 11	Toothgrinder	I Am	Nu metalcore, progressive metal, groove metal	Spinefarm	
October 11	Varials	In Darkness	Metalcore, post-hardcore, nu metal	Fearless	
October 11	Wale	Wow... That's Crazy	Hip-hop	Warner	
October 11	Waterparks	Fandom	Pop, pop rock, electropop	Hopeless	
October 11	YK Osiris	The Golden Child	R&B, hip-hop	Def Jam	
October 11	YoungBoy Never Broke Again	AI YoungBoy 2	Hip-hop	Never Broke Again, Atlantic	
October 13	Raury	Fervent		The Woods	
October 14	Beabadoobee	Space Cadet	Indie rock	Dirty Hit	
October 17	1the9	Blah Blah		PocketDol	
October 17	Becky G	Mala Santa	Reggaeton, Latin pop, Latin hip-hop	Sony Music Latin	
October 17	Gilla Band	The Talkies	Noise rock, post-punk, experimental rock	Rough Trade	
October 18	Ali Barter	Hello, I'm Doing My Best		Girly Bits, Inertia Music	
October 18	Alter Bridge	Walk the Sky	Alternative metal, hard rock, progressive metal	Napalm	
October 18	Bad Dreems	Doomsday Ballet		Farmer and the Owl	
October 18	Battles	Juice B Crypts	Experimental rock, electronic rock	Warp	
October 18	Berhana	Han		EQT Recordings	
October 18	Caroline Polachek	Pang	Pop, indie pop, experimental pop	Sony Music, The Orchard, Perpetual Novice	
October 18	Chris Janson	Real Friends	Country	Warner Nashville	
October 18	Clipping	There Existed an Addiction to Blood	Horrorcore	Sub Pop	
October 18	Dionne Warwick	Dionne Warwick & the Voices of Christmas	Christmas	Kind Music, BMG	
October 18	Dream State	Primrose Path	Post-hardcore, metalcore	UNFD	
October 18	Electric Guest	Kin		Atlantic	
October 18	Floating Points	Crush	Electronic	Ninja Tune	
October 18	Foals	Everything Not Saved Will Be Lost – Part 2	Progressive rock, arena rock	Warner Bros., Transgressive	
October 18	Gucci Mane	Woptober II	Hip-hop, trap	Atlantic, GUWOP Enterprises	
October 18	Homeboy Sandman	Dusty	Hip-hop	Mello	
October 18	Hovvdy	Heavy Lifter	Indie pop	Double Double Whammy	
October 18	Jacques Greene	Dawn Chorus	Electronica, house, ambient	LuckyMe	
October 18	James Arthur	You		Columbia	
October 18	Jessica Mauboy	Hilda		Sony Music Australia	
October 18	Jimmy Eat World	Surviving	Alternative rock, arena rock, emo	RCA	
October 18	Maddie & Tae	Everywhere I'm Goin'		Mercury Nashville	
October 18	The Magpie Salute	High Water II		Eagle	
October 18	Mark Lanegan Band	Somebody's Knocking		Heavenly	
October 18	Mavi	Let the Sun Talk			
October 18	The Muffs	No Holiday		Omnivore	
October 18	Nils Frahm	All Encores		Erased Tapes	
October 18	Refused	War Music	Hardcore punk	Spinefarm, Search and Destroy	
October 18	Rob Halford	Celestial	Heavy metal, Christmas music	Legacy	
October 18	Sufjan Stevens, Timo Andres	The Decalogue		Asthmatic Kitty	
October 18	Thandi Phoenix	Thandi Phoenix		Neon Records	
October 18	Third Eye Blind	Screamer	Pop rock	Mega Collider Records, Megaforce	
October 18	Vida Blue	Crossing Lines	Jazz fusion, funk rock	ATO	
October 18	Yungblud	The Underrated Youth		Geffen, Locomotion	
October 19	Vagabon	Vagabon	Art pop	Nonesuch	
October 21	Tomorrow X Together	The Dream Chapter: Magic	R&B	Big Hit, Republic	
October 22	Day6	The Book of Us: Entropy		JYP, Studio J	
October 22	Jazmin Bean	Worldwide Torture	Alternative pop, electropop, heavy metal	Aswang Birthday Cake, Interscope Island	
October 24	Gryffin	Gravity		Interscope	
October 25	Airbourne	Boneshaker		Spinefarm	
October 25	Akon	Akonda		Akonik Label Group	
October 25	Alcest	Spiritual Instinct	Blackgaze, post-black metal	Nuclear Blast	
October 25	Allison Moorer	Blood	Americana, country folk, alternative country	Autotelic Records, Thirty Tigers	
October 25	Anna Meredith	Fibs	Electronic	Moshi Moshi	
October 25	Anna of the North	Dream Girl		Honeymoon Records	
October 25	Armin van Buuren	Balance	Dance-pop	Armada, Kontor, Sony Music	
October 25	The Bad Plus	Activate Infinity	Jazz	Edition	
October 25	Bad Wolves	N.A.T.I.O.N.	Heavy metal, hard rock	Eleven Seven	
October 25	Brooke Candy	Sexorcism	Futurepop, house, trap	NUXXE	
October 25	Brothers Osborne	Live at the Ryman	Country	EMI Nashville	
October 25	Cigarettes After Sex	Cry	Ambient pop, dream pop	Partisan	
October 25	Deathprod	Occulting Disk		Smalltown Supersound	
October 25	Dry Cleaning	Boundary Road Snacks and Drinks	Post-punk, spoken word	It's OK	
October 25	Emma Marrone	Fortuna	Pop rock	Universal Italia, Polydor	
October 25	Fit for an Autopsy	The Sea of Tragic Beasts	Deathcore	Nuclear Blast	
October 25	Gallant	Sweet Insomnia		Mind of a Genius, Warner Bros.	
October 25	Grace Potter	Daylight	Soul, rock, Americana	Fantasy	
October 25	Guided by Voices	Sweating the Plague	Indie rock	Guided By Voices Inc.	
October 25	Hawkwind	All Aboard the Skylark	Space rock	Cherry Red	
October 25	James Blunt	Once Upon a Mind	Pop, folk-pop	Atlantic UK	
October 25	Jinjer	Macro		Napalm	
October 25	Kanye West	Jesus Is King	Christian hip-hop, gospel	GOOD Music, Def Jam	
October 25	Keaton Henson	Six Lethargies		Mercury KX	
October 25	King Princess	Cheap Queen	Pop	Zelig Records, Columbia	
October 25	Leprous	Pitfalls	Progressive rock	Inside Out Music	
October 25	London Elektricity	Building Better Worlds	Drum and bass	Hospital	
October 25	Longwave	If We Ever Live Forever	Indie rock	Bodan Kuma Recordings	
October 25	Mayhem	Daemon	Black metal	Century Media	
October 25	Negativland	True False	Experimental rock	Seeland	
October 25	Neil Young and Crazy Horse	Colorado	Rock	Reprise	
October 25	Norma Jean	All Hail	Metalcore	Solid State	
October 25	Old Dominion	Old Dominion	Country	RCA Nashville	
October 25	Puss n Boots	Dear Santa	Christmas		
October 25	Ringo Starr	What's My Name	Rock	Universal Music Enterprises	
October 25	Rings of Saturn	Gidim	Deathcore, technical death metal	Nuclear Blast	
October 25	Saint Asonia	Flawed Design	Alternative rock, nu metal	Spinefarm	
October 25	Shakespears Sister	Ride Again		Sunset Sound, Launmower Studios	
October 25	Stereophonics	Kind		Stylus, Parlophone	
October 25	Sunn O)))	Pyroclasts	Drone metal	Southern Lord	
October 25	Swans	Leaving Meaning	Experimental rock	Young God, Mute	
October 25	Teebs	Anicca		Brainfeeder	
October 25	Tessa Violet	Bad Ideas	Pop	T∆G Music	
October 25	Van Morrison	Three Chords & the Truth	Americana, blues rock	Exile Productions, Caroline	
October 28	Monsta X	Follow: Find You	K-pop	Starship Entertainment	
October 28	Taeyeon	Purpose	Pop	SM, Dreamus	
October 29	White Denim	In Person		Radio Milk Records	

=== November ===
List of albums released in November 2019
Go to: January | February | March | April | May | June | July | August | September | October | November | December | Back to top
Release date	Artist	Album	Genre	Label	Ref.
November 1	Alphabeat	Don't Know What's Cool Anymore	Pop	Warner Music Denmark	
November 1	Archie Roach	Tell Me Why		Bloodlines	
November 1	Cold War Kids	New Age Norms 1		CWKTWO Corp., AWAL	
November 1	Duki	Súper Sangre Joven	Trap	SSJ Records, Dale Play Records	
November 1	Earl Sweatshirt	Feet of Clay	Alternative hip-hop, avant-jazz, lo-fi	Tan Cressida, Warner	
November 1	Gang Starr	One of the Best Yet	Hip-hop	To the Top, Gang Starr Enterprises	
November 1	Half Moon Run	A Blemish in the Great Light	Indie rock, indie folk, indie pop	Crystal Math Music, Glassnote	
November 1	Highly Suspect	MCID	Rock	300, Atlantic	
November 1	Hootie & the Blowfish	Imperfect Circle	Country rock	Capitol Nashville	
November 1	Jeff Goldblum and the Mildred Snitzer Orchestra	I Shouldn't Be Telling You This	Jazz	Decca	
November 1	Jeff Lynne's ELO	From Out of Nowhere	Orchestral pop, rock and roll	Columbia	
November 1	Jeffrey Lewis & the Voltage	Bad Wiring	Anti-folk, indie rock	Don Giovanni, Moshi Moshi	
November 1	Keith Jarrett	Munich 2016		ECM	
November 1	Michael Kiwanuka	Kiwanuka		Polydor, Interscope	
November 1	Miranda Lambert	Wildcard	Country rock	RCA, Vanner Records	
November 1	New Politics	An Invitation to an Alternate Reality		Big Noise Music Group	
November 1	Nicky Jam	Íntimo		Sony Latin	
November 1	Novembers Doom	Nephilim Grove	Death-doom, progressive death metal, gothic metal	Prophecy	
November 1	Omni	Networker	Post-punk	Sub Pop	
November 1	Pabllo Vittar	111 1		Sony Music Brasil, BMT Produções Artísticas	
November 1	Sudan Archives	Athena		Stones Throw	
November 1	Sultan & Shepard	Echoes of Life: Day		Armada Music	
November 1	TR/ST	The Destroyer (Part 2)	Synth-pop	Grouch via House Arrest	
November 1	Turnover	Altogether	Indie rock, dream pop	Run for Cover	
November 1	Underworld	Drift Series 1		Smith Hyde Productions, Caroline International	
November 1	Various artists	Charlie's Angels: Original Motion Picture Soundtrack	Pop	Republic	
November 1	Vetiver	Up on High		Mama Bird Records	
November 1	Yelawolf	Ghetto Cowboy	Southern hip-hop	Slumerican	
November 4	Got7	Call My Name	K-pop	JYP	
November 4	Victon	Nostalgia		Play M Entertainment	
November 6	Asca	Hyakkaryōran		Sacra Music	
November 6	Hana	Hanadriel		HANA Ltd.	
November 7	bbno$	I Don't Care at All			
November 7	Doja Cat	Hot Pink	Pop, hip-hop, R&B	RCA	
November 7	Royal Coda	Compassion	Post-hardcore, experimental rock	Blue Swan	
November 8	Agnostic Front	Get Loud!		Nuclear Blast	
November 8	Audien	Escapism		Audien	
November 8	Bishop Briggs	Champion		Island	
November 8	Charles Rumback and Ryley Walker	Little Common Twist	Folk, jazz, ambient	Thrill Jockey	
November 8	FKA Twigs	Magdalene	Art pop, electronic	Young Turks	
November 8	The Flower Kings	Waiting for Miracles	Progressive rock	Inside Out	
November 8	Girl Ray	Girl		Moshi Moshi	
November 8	Have a Nice Life	Sea of Worry	Shoegaze, post-punk, post-rock	The Flenser	
November 8	Jason Derulo	2Sides (Side 1)		Beluga Heights, Warner	
November 8	Johannes Oerding	Konturen		Columbia	
November 8	Kele Okereke	2042		Kola Records	
November 8	Lil Mosey	Certified Hitmaker	Hip-hop, trap	Mogul Vision, Interscope	
November 8	Lucy Dacus	2019		Matador	
November 8	Luke Combs	What You See Is What You Get	Country	Columbia Nashville, River House Artists	
November 8	Michael Ball and Alfie Boe	Back Together		Decca	
November 8	Moor Mother	Analog Fluids of Sonic Black Holes		Don Giovanni	
November 8	Mount Eerie	Lost Wisdom pt. 2	Indie folk	P.W. Elverum & Sun Ltd.	
November 8	Quiet Riot	Hollywood Cowboys	Hard rock	Frontiers	
November 8	The Script	Sunsets & Full Moons		Sony Music	
November 8	Sebastian	Thirst		Ed Banger, Because	
November 8	Simply Red	Blue Eyed Soul		BMG	
November 8	Sultan & Shepard	Echoes of Life: Night		Armada Music	
November 8	Vanessa Amorosi	Back to Love		Angel Works Productions	
November 8	Vegyn	Only Diamonds Cut Diamonds	Electronica	PLZ Make It Ruins	
November 8	Zucchero	D.O.C.		Polydor	
November 12	Liturgy	H.A.Q.Q.	Black metal, avant-garde metal	YLYLCYN	
November 13	Gang Parade	Love Parade	J-pop	Fueled By Mentaiko	
November 13	GFriend	Fallin' Light	J-pop	King	
November 13	Koda Kumi	Re(cord)	J-pop	Rhythm Zone	
November 15	Benee	Stella & Steve	Electronic, R&B	Republic	
November 15	Bonnie "Prince" Billy	I Made a Place	Indie folk	Drag City, Domino	
November 15	Breathe Carolina	Dead: The Album	Dance-pop, EDM, electropop	Spinnin', Big Beat	
November 15	Celine Dion	Courage	Pop, EDM	Columbia	
November 15	Despised Icon	Purgatory	Deathcore	Nuclear Blast	
November 15	Dillon Francis	Magic Is Real		IDGAFOS, Mad Decent	
November 15	DJ Shadow	Our Pathetic Age		Mass Appeal	
November 15	Ezhel and Ufo361	Lights Out		Stay High	
November 15	Joe Henry	The Gospel According to Water		EarMusic Records	
November 15	Juliana Hatfield	Juliana Hatfield Sings The Police	Alternative rock	American Laundromat	
November 15	Kensington	Time		Universal	
November 15	Lady Antebellum	Ocean	Country pop	BMLG	
November 15	Liz	Planet Y2K	Electropop	Moving Castle	
November 15	Origami Angel	Somewhere City	Emo	Chatterbot Records	
November 15	Madeon	Good Faith	Nu-disco	Columbia	
November 15	Milky Chance	Mind the Moon		Ignition	
November 15	Tindersticks	No Treasure but Hope		Lucky Dog Recordings, City Slang	
November 15	Tory Lanez	Chixtape 5	R&B, |hip-hop	Mad Love Records, Interscope	
November 15	Westlife	Spectrum		Virgin EMI	
November 19	Sleep Token	Sundowning	Post-metal	Spinefarm	
November 19	Twice	&Twice	J-pop, EDM	Warner Music Japan	
November 21	Tinashe	Songs for You	R&B, dance-pop, trap	Tinashe Music Inc.	
November 22	Action Bronson and the Alchemist	Lamb over Rice		ALC Records	
November 22	Aerodrom	Dnevni rituali	Rock	Croatia	
November 22	Beck	Hyperspace	Synth-pop, R&B, dream pop	Capitol	
November 22	Big Band of Brothers	A Jazz Celebration of The Allman Brothers Band	Jazz	New West	
November 22	Blood Incantation	Hidden History of the Human Race	Technical death metal, psychedelic, death metal	Dark Descent Records, Century	
November 22	Coldplay	Everyday Life	Rock	Parlophone	
November 22	Davido	A Good Time	Afropop	DMW, RCA, Sony Music	
November 22	Grateful Dead	Ready or Not	Rock	Rhino	
November 22	Hannah Diamond	Reflections	Pop	PC Music	
November 22	Jason Aldean	9	Country rock	BBR Music	
November 22	Labrinth	Imagination & the Misfit Kid		Syco Music	
November 22	Leonard Cohen	Thanks for the Dance		Columbia, Legacy	
November 22	Lindemann	F & M	Neue Deutsche Härte, industrial metal	Universal, Vertigo Berlin	
November 22	Omar Souleyman	Shlon		Mad Decent	
November 22	Robbie Williams	The Christmas Present	Christmas	Columbia	
November 22	Rod Stewart with the Royal Philharmonic Orchestra	You're in My Heart: Rod Stewart with the Royal Philharmonic Orchestra	Symphonic rock	Warner	
November 22	Sodom	Out of the Frontline Trench		SPV/Steamhammer	
November 22	Tiziano Ferro	Accetto Miracoli	Pop, R&B	Virgin	
November 22	Trippie Redd	A Love Letter to You 4	Hip-hop, emo rap, trap	10K Projects, Caroline	
November 22	William Patrick Corgan	Cotillions	Americana	Martha's Music, BMG	
November 22	YNW Melly	Melly vs. Melvin		300, Atlantic	
November 27	Beyooooonds	Beyooooond1st		Zetima	
November 27	Ecco2k	E		Year0001	
November 29	Cattle Decapitation	Death Atlas	Deathgrind, technical death metal	Metal Blade	
November 29	The Game	Born 2 Rap	Hip-hop	Entertainment One, Prolific Records	
November 29	Jack Peñate	After You	Pop, electropop, blue-eyed soul	XL	
November 29	Jimmy Barnes	Modus Operandi		Bloodlines	
November 29	Judy Collins, Jonas Fjeld, and Chatham County Line	Winter Stories	Folk, bluegrass	Cleopatra, Wildflower Records	
November 29	Maruv	Hellcat Story		Warner Music Russia	
November 29	New Riders of the Purple Sage	Thanksgiving in New York City	Country rock	Omnivore	
November 29	Ozuna	Nibiru		Aura Music, Sony Latin	
November 29	Ozzy Osbourne	See You on the Other Side		Epic	
November 29	Prong	Age of Defiance		Steamhammer	

=== December ===
List of albums released in December 2019
Go to: January | February | March | April | May | June | July | August | September | October | November | December | Back to top
Release date	Artist	Album	Genre	Label	Ref.
December 2	Iggy Azalea	Wicked Lips	Pop, hip-hop	Bad Dreams, Empire	
December 2	Roc Marciano	Marcielago	East Coast hip-hop, gangsta rap	Marci Enterprises	
December 3	Drezden	Edelweiss	Synth-pop	Soyuz Music	
December 4	Band-Maid	Conqueror	Hard rock	Revolver	
December 4	Park Ji-hoon	360		Maroo	
December 6	Camila Cabello	Romance	Pop	Epic, Syco	
December 6	The Chainsmokers	World War Joy	Electropop, EDM	Disruptor, Columbia	
December 6	Cold Chisel	Blood Moon		Cold Chisel Music	
December 6	Fat Joe and Dre	Family Ties	Hip-hop	RNG Records, Empire	
December 6	French Montana	Montana		Epic	
December 6	Ha*Ash	Ha*Ash: En Vivo		Sony Music Latin, OCESA Seitrack	
December 6	Hail the Ghost	Arrhythmia	Art rock	White Heart Records	
December 6	Idles	A Beautiful Thing: Idles Live at le Bataclan	Rock, punk rock, indie rock	Partisan	
December 6	Kylie Minogue	Golden Live in Concert	Pop	Darenote, BMG	
December 6	Liam Payne	LP1	Pop, R&B, EDM	Capitol	
December 6	Peter Ulrich	Final Reflections	Alternative rock		
December 6	Roddy Ricch	Please Excuse Me for Being Antisocial	Hip-hop, trap	Atlantic	
December 6	The Who	Who	Rock	Polydor	
December 6	XXXTentacion	Bad Vibes Forever	Hip-hop, alternative rock, alternative R&B	Empire	
December 9	Stray Kids	Clé: Levanter	Hip-hop, EDM, K-pop	JYP, Dreamus	
December 10	Baek Ye-rin	Every Letter I Sent You	R&B	Blue Vinyl, Dreamus	
December 11	BoA	Starry Night	K-pop	SM	
December 13	American Football	Year One Demos	Emo	Polyvinyl	
December 13	Atmosphere	Whenever	Hip-hop	Rhymesayers	
December 13	City Morgue	City Morgue Vol 2: As Good as Dead	Trap metal	Hikari-Ultra, Republic	
December 13	Daniel Lopatin	Uncut Gems	Electronica	Warp	
December 13	Duster	Duster	Space rock, indie rock, slowcore	Muddguts Records	
December 13	Free Nationals	Free Nationals	R&B, soul, funk	OBE LLC, Empire	
December 13	Harry Styles	Fine Line	Pop rock	Columbia	
December 13	Kaytranada	Bubba	Dance, pop, alternative R&B	RCA, Kaytranada Ent	
December 13	Officium Triste	The Death of Gaia	Death-doom, doom metal	Transcending Obscurity Records	
December 13	Pink Floyd	The Later Years	Progressive rock	Pink Floyd Records, Legacy	
December 13	Smokepurpp	Deadstar 2	Hip-hop, trap	Alamo, Interscope	
December 13	Stormzy	Heavy Is the Head	British hip-hop, soul, grime	#Merky Records, Atlantic UK	
December 18	Airi Suzuki	I		Zetima	
December 18	Empire	The Great Journey Album		WACK, Avex Trax	
December 18	Luna Sea	Cross	Alternative rock	Universal	
December 18	Shiritsu Ebisu Chugaku	Playlist		SME	
December 20	December Avenue	Langit Mong Bughaw	Indie pop, emo, pop-punk	Tower of Doom Records	
December 20	Gucci Mane	East Atlanta Santa 3		GUWOP Enterprises, Atlantic	
December 20	Julianna Barwick	Circumstance Synthesis		Mistletone	
December 20	Rogério Skylab	Crítica da Faculdade do Cu	Experimental rock, art rock, MPB		
December 23	Ariana Grande	K Bye for Now (SWT Live)		Republic	
December 23	Red Velvet	The ReVe Festival: Finale	Pop	SM	
December 25	Sayaka Yamamoto	α		Universal Sigma	
December 25	Sunday Service	Jesus Is Born	Gospel	INC, Vydia	
December 27	Bring Me the Horizon	Music to Listen To...	Electropop, electronica, ambient	Sony Music, RCA	
December 27	G.E.M.	City Zoo	Mandopop	Sony Music	
December 27	JackBoys and Travis Scott	JackBoys	Hip-hop, trap	Cactus Jack, Epic	
