= Live in Hollywood =

Live in Hollywood may refer to one of the following albums:

- Live in Hollywood (Linda Ronstadt album), 2019
- Live in Hollywood (Warne Marsh album), 1979
- Live in Hollywood (RBD album), 2006
  - Live in Hollywood (RBD video album), 2006
- Live in Hollywood (The Doors album), 2002
- CeCe Peniston (EP Live) by Peniston, in 2013 retitled as Live in Hollywood
- Live in Hollywood by Marianne Faithfull
