= Conversations (Woman's Hour album) =

Studio album by Woman's Hour
- Released: 15 July 2014
- Genre: Indie pop, alternative
- Length: 41:59
- Label: Secretly Canadian

Woman's Hour chronology
Conversations (2014)	Ephyra (2019)

Conversations is the debut album by London-based group Woman's Hour. This album is mixture of indie pop, alternative and electronic pop. Adding swooning synths, clipped rhythms, and muted guitars, "Conversations" is new wave with a twist of some nocturnal R&B and soft disco.

== Track listing ==
1. "Unbroken Sequence" (3:33)
2. "Conversations" (3:20)
3. "To the End" (4:27)
4. "Darkest Place" (4:06)
5. "In Stillness We Remain" (3:38)
6. "Our Love Has No Rhythm" (4:27)
7. "Her Ghost" (3:13)
8. "Two Sides of You" (3:34)
9. "Devotion" (4:23)
10. "Reflections" (3:46)
11. "The Day That Needs Defending" (3:32)
