= All That Ever Could Have Been =

Studio album by MOLLY
- Released: June 28, 2019
- Genre: Dream pop; post-rock; shoegaze
- Length: 60:13
- Language: English
- Label: Sonic Cathedral Recordings
- Producer: MOLLY; Wolfgang Möstl

MOLLY chronology
Glimpse (2018)	All That Ever Could Have Been (2019)	All That Was (2020)

All That Ever Could Have Been is the first full-length studio album by Austrian dream pop and post-rock band MOLLY. It has received positive reviews from critics.

== Reception ==
According to the review aggregator Metacritic, All That Ever Could Have Been received "generally favorable reviews" based on a weighted average score of 74 out of 100 from four critic scores. Editors at AllMusic rated this album 3.5 out of 5 stars, with critic Timothy Monger writing that that album is "somewhat of a grower" and "while its charms might take a few spins to unpack themselves, Andersson and Dornauer have applied their own unique set of filters and experiences to the dreamier side of post-rock on this solid debut". Writing for The Line of Best Fit, Chris Todd gave this release an 8.5 out of 10, stating that "this is an album where quiet is key, they have a propensity towards ‘the hush’, using the space between sounds as instrumentation in very much the same wayas Talk Talk did on their final two albums". Dafydd Jenkins of Loud and Quiet scored this release a 3 out of 10, characterizing the music as "pedestrian" and "achingly dull". Giving All That Ever Could Have Been 4 out of 5 stars, Will Hodgkinson of The Times stated that this music "floats along with wondrous, widescreen calm" and compares MOLLY to musical acts such as Pink Floyd and Popul Vuh.

== Track listing ==
All songs written by MOLLY.

1. "Coming of Age" – 14:53
2. "The Fountain of Youth" – 4:45
3. "Vogelnest" – 8:31
4. "As Years Go By" – 7:05
5. "All That Ever Could Have Been" – 10:21
6. "Slowly" – 3:38
7. "Weep, Gently Weep" – 7:11
8. "Coming of Age, Pt. 2" – 3:49

== Personnel ==
MOLLY

- Lars Andersson – guitar, vocals, production
- Phillip Dornauer – drums, production

Additional personnel

- James Aparicio – mastering
- Julian Berger – artwork, design
- Wolfgang Möstl – production

== See also ==
- List of 2019 albums
