= The Flower and the Vessel =

Studio album by Félicia Atkinson
- Released: 5 July 2019
- Genre: Ambient; experimental
- Length: 70:00
- Label: Shelter Press
- Producer: Félicia Atkinson; Stephen O'Malley

Félicia Atkinson chronology
Hand in Hand (2017)	The Flower and the Vessel (2019)	Everything Evaporate (2020)

The Flower and the Vessel is a studio album by French musician Félicia Atkinson. It was released on 5 July 2019 through Shelter Press. It received generally favorable reviews from critics.

== Background ==
Félicia Atkinson, previously known as Je Suis le Petit Chevalier, is a French experimental musician and visual artist. She created The Flower and the Vessel while pregnant on tour. She has cited Maurice Ravel's L'enfant et les sortilèges, Claude Debussy's La mer, and Erik Satie's Gymnopédies as influences on the album. The album's closing track "Des Pierres" features Sunn O)))'s Stephen O'Malley on guitar and production. The album was released on 5 July 2019 through Shelter Press.

== Critical reception ==
Professional ratings
Aggregate scores
Source	Rating
Metacritic	80/100
Review scores
Source	Rating
Exclaim!	8/10
Pitchfork	7.8/10
PopMatters	8/10
Resident Advisor	4.0/5
Spectrum Culture	4.25/5
Tiny Mix Tapes	3.5/5 stars

According to the review aggregator Metacritic, The Flower and the Vessel received "generally favorable reviews" based on a weighted average score of 80 out of 100 from 7 critic scores.

Jonathan Williger of Resident Advisor commented that the album "creates a sense of immersion both through multi-layered sonic expanses and sparse passages that let small, quiet sounds express themselves fully." Hans Kim of PopMatters wrote, "Each song applies an intense focus on the moments and sounds that are otherwise unnoticed." He added, "This fascination with negative space finds materials in what is seemingly silent or empty." Philip Sherburne of Pitchfork stated, "She slips between English and French, and though the meaning of her words is not always apparent, the tone of her voice lends a dead-of-night intensity that renders the music's pockets of silence all the more potent."

=== Accolades ===
Year-end lists for The Flower and the Vessel
Publication	List	Rank	Ref.
The Quietus	Quietus Albums of the Year 2019	83	
The Vinyl Factory	Our 50 Favourite Albums of 2019	44	
The Wire	Releases of the Year (2019 Rewind)	49	

== Track listing ==
All tracks are written by Félicia Atkinson.

The Flower and the Vessel track listing
No.	Title	Length
1.	"L'Après-Midi"	0:56
2.	"Moderato Cantabile"	7:58
3.	"Shirley to Shirley"	4:14
4.	"Un Ovale Vert"	3:48
5.	"You Have to Have Eyes"	8:02
6.	"Linguistics of Atoms"	5:58
7.	"Lush"	3:38
8.	"Joan"	6:44
9.	"Open/Ouvre"	4:02
10.	"L'Enfant et le Poulpe"	5:58
11.	"Des Pierres"	18:42
Total length:		70:00

== Personnel ==
Credits adapted from liner notes.

- Félicia Atkinson – production, mixing
- Adam Selzer – recording (8, 9)
- Martin Antiphon – recording (11)
- Stephen O'Malley – guitar (11), production (11)
- Rashad Becker – mastering
- Bartolomé Sanson – design
- Julien Carreyn – photography
- Naomi Tamamura – photography assistance
