= I Made a Place =

Studio album by Bonnie "Prince" Billy
- Released: November 15, 2019
- Studio: Downtown Recording, Louisville, Kentucky, United States
- Genre: Indie folk
- Length: 43:34
- Label: Drag City/Domino
- Producer: Mark Nevers

Bonnie "Prince" Billy chronology
Wolf of the Cosmos (2018)	I Made a Place (2019)

I Made a Place is a 2019 album by Bonnie "Prince" Billy, the stage name of American indie folk musician Will Oldham. It was released to positive critical reception.

== Recording ==
The songs that make up I Made a Place were recorded by Oldham with producer Mark Nevers; the duo originally considered making a Ramones cover album but after the death of David Berman, they went back to original songs. These compositions were recorded with no intention on releasing an album.

== Critical reception ==
Professional ratings
Aggregate scores
Source	Rating
AnyDecentMusic?	7.8/10
Metacritic	82/100
Review scores
Source	Rating
AllMusic	3.5/5 stars
American Songwriter	4/5 stars
Exclaim!	8/10
The Guardian	4/5 stars
MusicOMH	4/5 stars
NME	4/5 stars
Pitchfork	7.1/10

The editorial staff of AllMusic gave the album 3.5 out of five stars, with reviewer Fred Thomas concluding that it is made up of solid songwriting but stating, "While no less emotionally dense than that or any of Oldham's work, I Made a Place feels less intense, and even fun by comparison". Kitty Empire of The Observer gave it four out of five stars, for the moving quality of Oldham's lyrics and in particular his investigation of solitude. Sal Sodomsky of Pitchfork awarded the album 7.1 out of 10 for what he wrote was one of Oldham's most "complicated" albums. Stereogum named it album of the week, with Tom Breihan calling the songs "security-blanket music, and it's lovely".

=== Accolades ===
Accolades for I Made a Place
Publication	Accolade	Rank
Slant Magazine	Top 25 Albums of 2019	25
Uncut	Top 75 Albums of 2019	39

== Track listing ==
All songs written by Bonnie "Prince" Billy

1. "New Memory Box" – 3:01
2. "Dream Awhile" – 3:31
3. "The Devil's Throat" – 3:33
4. "Look Backward on Your Future, Look Forward to Your Past" – 3:55
5. "I Have Made a Place" – 3:39
6. "Squid Eye" – 2:46
7. "You Know the One" – 3:37
8. "This Is Far from Over" – 2:46
9. "Nothing Is Busted" – 4:33
10. "Mama Mama" – 2:32
11. "The Glow, Pt. 3" – 3:22
12. "Thick Air" – 2:41
13. "Building a Fire" – 3:38

== Personnel ==
- Bonnie "Prince" Billy – guitar, vocals
- Jacob Duncan – woodwind, keyboards
- Chris Greenwell – recording
- Mike Hyman – drums
- Danny Kiely – bass guitar
- Cheyenne Mize – fiddle
- Mark Nevers – production
- Dan Osborn – layout
- Chris Rodahaffer – banjo, pedal steel guitar
- Carl Saff – mastering
- Nathan Salsburg – guitar
- Joan Shelley – vocals

== Charts ==
Chart performance for I Made a Place
Chart (2019)	Peak position
Austrian Albums (Ö3 Austria)	56
Belgian Albums (Ultratop Flanders)	114
German Albums (Offizielle Top 100)	87
Scottish Albums (OCC)	58
Swiss Albums (Schweizer Hitparade)	93
