= Hotel Amour =

Studio album by Meow Meow and Thomas Lauderdale featuring Pink Martini
- Released: March 22, 2019
- Label: Heinz

Hotel Amour is a studio album by Meow Meow (Melissa Madden Gray) and Thomas Lauderdale featuring Pink Martini, released on March 22, 2019 via Heinz Records. Featured guests include Barry Humphries, Michel Legrand, Rufus Wainwright, and The von Trapps.

== Reception ==
In his review of Meow Meow's 2013 performance at New York City's Stanley H. Kaplan Penthouse, Stephen Holden of The New York Times described the title song as "a delicate, wistful reflection on a futile search for love that melted your heart". She also performed the song at the McCallum Theatre gala in 2016.

== Track listing ==
Some songs written by Meow Meow & Thomas Lauderdale, some covers

1. "I Lost Myself (I'm Hungry... and That Ain't Right)", featuring Pink Martini
2. "Mon homme marié", featuring Pink Martini
3. "I'm Waiting for You to Come Back", featuring Pink Martini
4. "Hotel Amour", featuring Pink Martini
5. "Die blaue Stunde", featuring Pink Martini
6. "Sans toi", featuring Michel Legrand & Pink Martini
7. "Mausi, Süß Warst Du Heute Nacht", featuring Barry Humphries & Pink Martini
8. "Bonjour Tristesse", featuring Pink Martini
9. "True Love", featuring Pink Martini
10. "À quoi ça sert l'amour", featuring Rufus Wainwright & Pink Martini
11. "Hi-Lili, Hi-Lo", featuring The von Trapps & Pink Martini
12. "Die blaue Stunde II", featuring Pink Martini

Track listing adapted from the iTunes Store
