= Woman's Hour (band) =

- Origin: London, England
- Genres: Indie pop
- Years active: 2011–2019
- Labels: Secretly Canadian
- Past members: Fiona Burgess; William Burgess; Josh Hunnisett; Nicholas Graves

Woman's Hour was a British indie pop four-piece band based in London, England. The group was formed by siblings Fiona and William Burgess, along with Nicolas Graves and Josh Hunnisett. They played their first show in 2011, and released their debut album Conversations on Secretly Canadian in 2014. In December 2018 the band announced they would be breaking up after the release of their second album Ephyra.

== History ==
After graduating with a degree in drama and applied theatre in 2011, front-woman Fiona, paired up with William who was already producing and making records. Woman's Hour got their name from the London female-focused news and culture show on BBC Radio 4. They catalogued their demos by different Radio 4 programmes and the demo name Woman's Hour was adopted as the band's name.

They have graphics and monochrome visuals that were curated with TATE Modern and MoMA certified fine artists Oliver Chanarin and Adam Broomberg.

Their debut album, Conversations, received a 10/10 score and the award of Debut Album Of The Year in The Line Of Best Fit for 2014 and 9/10 at Drowned in Sound among others. In December 2018 the group announced they would be splitting up after the release of their second album Ephyra and a tour of the UK. The band's final show was at the Dome in Tufnell Park, north London on 22 March 2019.

== Musical style ==
Allmusic described their musical style as "a signature sound of synths and subtlety".

== Discography ==
=== Albums ===
- 2014: Conversations
- 2019: Ephyra
