= Frances Cone =

American indie pop band

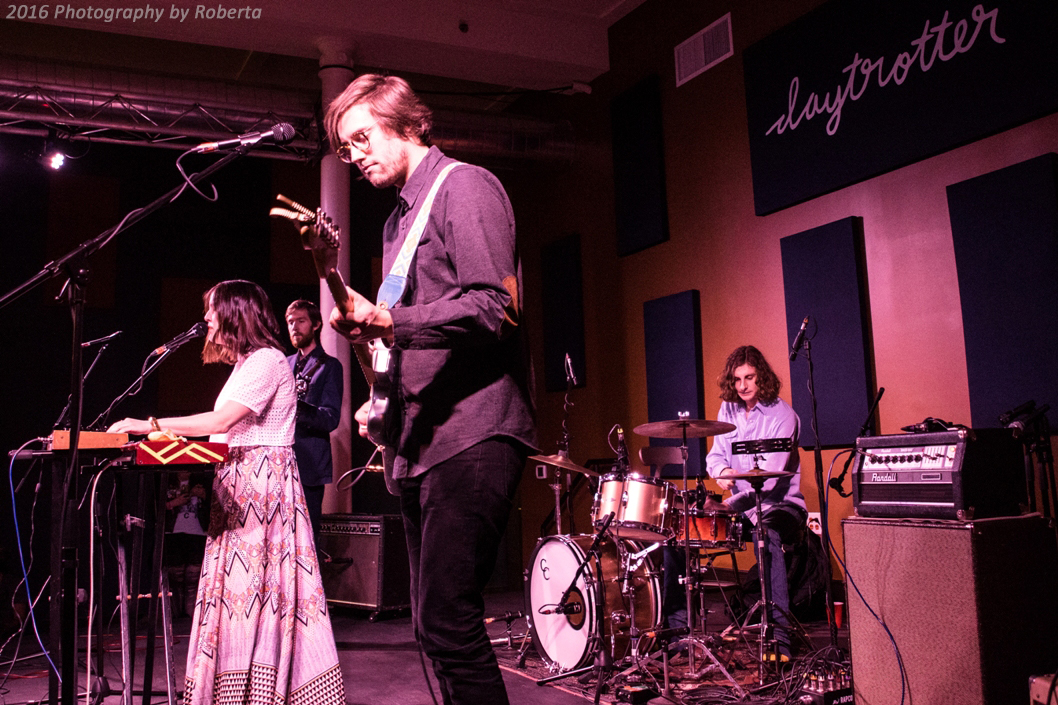
- Frances Cone in 2016

Background information
- Origin: Brooklyn, New York
- Genre: Indie pop
- Years active: 2013 – present
- Members: Christina Cone; Andrew Doherty
- Past members: Jeff Malinowski; Owen Beverly; Kenneth Harris; Ward Williams; Alex Baron; Adam Melchor; Aaron Hamel

Frances Cone is an American indie pop band started in Brooklyn, New York and currently based in Nashville, Tennessee.

The band consists of Christina Cone and Andrew Doherty. Frances Cone is named after Christina's father and great-grandfather, both musicians themselves in South Carolina and both born on September 11.

== History ==
Frances Cone began in 2013 with the release of their first full-length album titled Come Back. In 2014, Frances Cone released a self-titled EP that streamed on Paste Magazine, which subsequently featured them in their "Best of What’s Next" series stating, "You’ll hear everything from folk inspired harmonies, to driving bass drums, to grungy synths, all culminating in an arena anthem, where Cone’s roof-lifting vocals shine."

In January 2016, Frances Cone released their first single titled "Arizona" from their forthcoming second full-length album, Late Riser, which is set to release on January 18, 2019. By March 2017, "Arizona" had accumulated over 6 million streams on Spotify. NPR Music's All Songs Considered called "Arizona" a "5 out of 5" song and featured the band as one of their overall highlights at SXSW 2017. The song is about Christina's brother, the filmmaker Stephen Cone.

"Leave Without You," the second single from Late Riser, premiered on Billboard in March 2017. The song is about the decision to leave New York, which Christina says "is the only place I've known as an adult person."

== Band members ==
- Christina Cone
- Andrew Doherty

== Discography ==
Studio albums

- Come Back (2013)
- Late Riser (2019)

EPs

- Frances Cone (2014)
