= Carpet Denim =

Studio album by Tijuana Panthers
- Released: July 12, 2019
- Recorded: 2018–2019
- Genres: Garage rock; surf rock; indie rock
- Length: 39:42
- Label: Innovative Leisure
- Producer: Jonny Bell

Tijuana Panthers chronology
Max Baker (2015)	Carpet Denim (2019)

Singles from Carpet Denim
- 1. "Path of Totality" Released: May 8, 2019; 2. "Little Pamplemousse" Released: June 10, 2019; 3. "You Died" Released: June 26, 2019

Professional ratings
Aggregate scores
Source	Rating
Album of the Year	80/100
Review scores
Source	Rating
AllMusic	4/5 stars
Flood Magazine	4.5/5 stars
mxdwn	Positive

Carpet Denim is the fifth studio album by American surf rock band Tijuana Panthers. The album was released on July 12, 2019, through Innovative Leisure.

== Track listing ==
All music is composed by Daniel Michicoff, Phil Shaheen, Michael Shelbourn, and Chad Wachtel.

No.	Title	Length
1.	"Path of Totality"	3:03
2.	"First Date"	2:35
3.	"710"	2:36
4.	"Little Pamplemousse"	2:14
5.	"Owl Eyes"	1:41
6.	"End of My Rope"	4:08
7.	"Garbage Person"	3:17
8.	"I Don't Mind"	2:25
9.	"Generation Singular"	2:13
10.	"TV People"	2:29
11.	"Different Side of Town"	2:58
12.	"You Died"	4:10
13.	"Rat Tail"	2:36
14.	"Friday Night Baby"	3:18
Total length:		39:42

== Personnel ==
The following individuals were credited with the production and packaging of the album.

- Jonny Bell — Producer
- Daniel Michicoff — Bass, Composer, Guitar, Keyboards, Vocals
- Phil Shaheen — Composer, Drums, Synthesizer, Vocals
- Michael Shelbourn — Drums
- Michael Stonis — Photography
- Tijuana Panthers — Primary Artist
- Chad Wachtel — Composer, Guitar, Vocals
