= Love Starvation / Trombone =

EP by Nick Lowe
- Released: May 17, 2019
- Recorded: 2018
- Studios: Hidden Quarry Studio, Pow Wow Fun Room
- Genres: Rock, Americana
- Label: Yep Roc
- Producer: Nick Lowe

Nick Lowe chronology
Tokyo Bay/Crying Inside (2018)	Love Starvation / Trombone (2019)	Nick Lowe & Los Straitjackets: Live at Haw River Ballroom (2020)

Love Starvation / Trombone is an EP from British singer-songwriter Nick Lowe. It is Lowe's second EP to feature the American surf rock band, Los Straitjackets, as his backing band. The EP was released on May 17, 2019 through Yep Roc Records. It reached #7 on Billboard's Americana/Folk Albums chart, #28 on the Independent Albums chart, and #31 on the Current Rock Albums chart.

== Background and recording ==
The majority of Love Starvation / Trombone was recorded in Woodstock, NY, during a short break from touring.

The tracks "Love Starvation," "Blue on Blue" and "Raincoat in the River" were recorded at Hidden Quarry Studios in Bearsville, NY by Tuck Nelson and Danny Blume. Additional recordings were conducted by Chris Fisher at Easter Island Productions in Brentwood, TN. "Trombone" was recorded at the Pow Wow Fun Room in Mar Vista, CA by Tuck Nelson and Los Straitjacket's bass player, Pete Curry. Additional recording took place at SkillsWest in Burbank, CA. The trombone on the track "Trombone" was played by Duane Benjamin and was arranged by Jimmy Vivino of Conan O’Brien’s Basic Cable Band.

Love Starvation / Trombone was mixed at Silver Shark Studios in Tooting Bec, London, UK, by Nick Lowe and Tuck Nelson. The EP was mastered by Tim Young at Metropolis in London.

== Critical reception ==
Professional ratings
Review scores
Source	Rating
AllMusic	4/5 stars
American Songwriter	3.5/5 stars
Americana UK	8/10 stars
Electric Eye	7/10 stars

Rolling Stone premiered the track "Love Starvation" on February 25, 2019. Hank Shteamer began his article with a quote, "'That’s what’s really cool about a guy like Nick, that he’d agree to something like this,' Los Straitjackets guitarist Eddie Angel told Rolling Stone last year of the masked instrumental rockers’ ongoing collaboration with veteran singer-songwriter Nick Lowe. 'We had nothing to lose. But he did: his reputation!'"

On May 21, 2019 Love Starvation / Trombone was given a 7 out of 10 rating by the online publication, Electric Eye. The review ended with, "At 70, Nick Lowe has stopped playing the part of the Jesus of Cool. He no longer needs to proselytise: just like his music, Nick Lowe IS Cool."

Love Starvation/Trombone was given an 8 out of 10 rating by Americana UK on May 21, 2019. Jim Finnie ended his review with, "Nick Lowe is a bit of national musical treasure and long may his enthusiasm and creativity continue."

NPR's Ken Tucker reviewed Love Starvation / Trombone during a segment on May 27, 2019. Tucker began with, "In their recent releases, Nick Lowe (along with Los Straitjackets) and Wreckless Eric have created new music that connects to old music without maudlin nostalgia or huffy defensiveness."

In a review for AllMusic, Stephen Thomas Erlewine says, "The second EP Nick Lowe recorded with Los Straitjackets within the course of a year, Love Starvation/Trombone does indeed play a bit like a genuine double-45 that its title suggests: the two main songs are paired with flipsides that are a bit lighter and mellower than the A-sides."

American Songwriter gave the EP a "3.5 out of 5 stars" rating. Hal Horowitz began his review with, "When Nick Lowe was addressing the audience about what they were about to hear at a show during his recent tour, he cautioned there would be a few new songs sprinkled into the set list. But, in typical self-deprecating Lowe fashion, he reassured the audience that a) they would be short and b) they sound just like the old songs anyway, so not to worry."

== Track listing ==
No.	Title	Writer(s)	Length
1.	"Love Starvation"	Nick Lowe	2:45
2.	"Blue on Blue"	Nick Lowe	3:26
3.	"Trombone"	Nick Lowe	4:11
4.	"Raincoat in the River"	Aaron Schroeder, Chuck Kaye	3:00
Total length:			13:12

== Personnel ==
- Nick Lowe: lead vocals, acoustic guitar, producer
- Eddie Angel: guitar
- Greg Townson: guitar
- Pete Curry: bass
- Chris Sprague: drums, backing vocals
- Tuck Nelson: mixing engineer
- Duane Benjamin: trombone
- Jimmy Vivino: arrangement for "Trombone"
- Tim Young: mastering
- Nils Schlebusch: front cover photo
- Nathan Golub: illustration and package design
- Peta Waddington: art direction and aesthetics
- Danny Blume: recording on "Love Starvation", "Blue on Blue", and "Raincoat in the River"

*Personnel information taken from Love Starvation / Trombone liner notes.
