= Memory Emotion =

Studio album by Electric Youth
- Released: August 9, 2019
- Genre: Synth-pop; alternative pop
- Label: Watts Arcade Inc., Last Gang Records
- Producer: Electric Youth

Electric Youth chronology
Innerworld (2014)	Memory Emotion (2019)

Professional ratings
Review scores
Source	Rating
AllMusic	3.5/5 stars
Exclaim!	5/10
PopMatters	5/10

Memory Emotion is the second full-length studio album by synth-pop band Electric Youth. The album was released on Watts Arcade Inc. and Last Gang Records on August 9, 2019. While initially met with mixed reviews from critics, it went on to garner an Electronic Album of the Year nomination at the 2020 Juno Awards, a first for the group.

== Track listing ==
No.	Title	Length
1.	"The Life"	4:29
2.	"ARAWA"	4:40
3.	"Breathless"	4:31
4.	"Real Ones"	4:46
5.	"On My Own"	3:15
6.	"Higher"	5:57
7.	"Thirteen"	3:33
8.	"Evergreen 143"	3:54
9.	"Now Now"	3:42
10.	"Through the Same Eyes"	2:59
11.	"Memory Emotion"
Total length:		43:00
