= Tijuana Panthers =

American surf rock band

- Origin: Long Beach, California, U.S.
- Genres: Surf rock
- Years active: 2005–present
- Label: Innovative Leisure
- Members: Chad Wachtel; Daniel Michicoff; Phil Shaheen
- Website: tijuanapanthers.com

Tijuana Panthers are an American surf rock band from Long Beach, California consisting of Daniel Michicoff (bass/vocals), Chad Wachtel (guitar/vocals) and Phil Shaheen (drums/vocals).

== Discography ==
=== Studio albums ===
- Max Baker (2010)
- Semi-Sweet (2013)
- Wayne Interest (2014)
- Poster (2015)
- Carpet Denim (2019)
- Halfway to Eighty (2022)

=== Extended plays ===
- Tijuana (2008)
- ‘’Pull the Chute’’ (2020)
