= Late Riser =

Studio album by Frances Cone
- Released: January 18, 2019
- Genres: Indie pop, folk-pop, pop rock
- Length: 33:49
- Label: Living Daylights

Frances Cone chronology
Frances Cone (2014)	Late Riser (2019)

Singles from Late Riser
- 1. "Arizona" Released: January 29, 2016

Professional ratings
Aggregate scores
Source	Rating
Metacritic	78/100
Review scores
Source	Rating
Blurt	3/5 stars
Glide Magazine	8/10
Paste	6.8/10
PopMatters	8/10

Late Riser is the second studio album by American band Frances Cone. It was released in on January 17, 2019 through Living Daylights.

== Track listing ==
Late Riser track listing
No.	Title	Length
1.	"Wide Awake"	3:37
2.	"Failure"	3:09
3.	"Unraveling"	3:20
4.	"Late Riser"	3:17
5.	"All for the Best"	4:39
6.	"Arizona"	3:17
7.	"Easy Love"	2:38
8.	"Waterline"	3:46
9.	"Over Now"	4:10
10.	"All Along"	1:56
