= Ephyra (album) =

Studio album by Woman's Hour
- Released: 15 February 2019
- Length: 31:10
- Label: Practice Music

Singles from Ephyra
- 1. "Don't Speak" Released: 11 December 2018; 2. "Luke" Released: 30 January 2019

Professional ratings
Aggregate scores
Source	Rating
Metacritic	73/100
Review scores
Source	Rating
Clash	7/10
DIY	4/5 stars
Drowned in Sound	8/10
NME	3/5 stars

Ephyra is the second studio album by English band Woman's Hour. It was released on 15 February 2019 through Practice Music.

It is the band's final album before their break-up due to tensions between the band members.

== Track listing ==
No.	Title	Length
1.	"Don't Speak"	3:04
2.	"From Eden to Exile Then into Dust"	6:24
3.	"I Can't Take You Seriously"	5:30
4.	"Luke"	3:58
5.	"Mirrorball"	2:59
6.	"Heathen"	4:06
7.	"It's a Blast"	3:31
8.	"Removal of Hope"	2:08
