= Live in Hollywood (Linda Ronstadt album) =

Live In Hollywood

Live album by Linda Ronstadt
- Released: February 1, 2019
- Recorded: 1980
- Venues: Television Center Studios, Hollywood, CA
- Genre: Rock
- Length: 43:39
- Label: Rhino
- Producer: John Boylan

Linda Ronstadt chronology
Opus Collection (2014)	Live In Hollywood (2019)

Singles from Live in Hollywood
- 1. "Just One Look" Released: December 14, 2018; 2. "You're No Good" Released: January 30, 2019

Professional ratings
Review scores
Source	Rating
AllMusic	3.5/5 stars
American Songwriter	3/5 stars
Audiophile Audition	4.5/5 stars
Country Universe	4/5 stars

Live In Hollywood is a 2019 live album release by Linda Ronstadt. It was recorded at Television Center Studios in Hollywood, California on April 24, 1980, for broadcast as a special on HBO. All tracks from this recording except "Blue Bayou" and "Poor Poor Pitiful Me" are previously unreleased. This is the first live album released by Ronstadt. The master tapes, thought to be lost, were discovered through a chance encounter with a Warner Brothers engineer leading to their recovery.

The backing band for this recording includes some of the musicians who collaborated with Ronstadt many times over the years: Kenny Edwards of the Stone Poneys, Danny Kortchmar, Dan Dugmore, Bill Payne of Little Feat, Wendy Waldman, Bob Glaub, Peter Asher and Russ Kunkel. A then fifteen-year-old Wendy Waldman describes meeting Ronstadt for the first time in 1965 and how she later toured with her and came to be on this album. "Desperado" was originally the title song from a 1973 LP by the Eagles.

Some songs performed at the concert, such as "Party Girl", "I Can't Help It (If I'm Still in Love With You)", "Look Out for My Love", "Mad Love", "Cost of Love", "Lies", "Silver Threads and Golden Needles" and "Heat Wave", are not included on the album. An expanded edition with all 20 songs that were performed was released on October 25, 2024.

== Critical reception ==
Stephen Thomas Erlewine of AllMusic writes in his interview, "These 12 tracks casually illustrate her facility with both soft rock and old-time rock & roll, and if the set list leans heavily on oldies, the combination of guts and polish makes her renditions memorable."

Hal Horowitz of American Songwriter remarks that "she’s in terrific voice throughout with a few standout performances like the closing 'Desperado' — a knockout, dramatic vocal accompanied only by Payne’s piano — and a powerful take on Roy Orbison’s 'Blue Bayou' (has anyone done that song better?)"

Randy Lewis of the Los Angeles Times writes, "What audiences today hear on Live in Hollywood is exactly what Ronstadt sang into her microphone."

Matt Wardlaw of Ultimate Classic Rock begins his interview with Ronstadt about the album with, "Most artists stick with a repetitively upbeat message when promoting a new project, but the always-honest Linda Ronstadt isn't most artists. In fact, she's expressing doubts about a new concert recording called Live in Hollywood, taken from a performance orchestrated for broadcast by HBO in 1980."

Stephen L. Betts of Rolling Stone writes, "Although the famously self-critical Ronstadt has never liked listening to her own records, she’s thankful the resurgence of vinyl LPs means record buyers have the chance to hear more of the details and nuance labored over by the singer, her band, producers and engineers."

Michael Fremer of Analog Planet writes, "This is the soundtrack to a generation on both the originals and Ronstadt's well-known covers brought back to life for one more go round."

Jim Harrington of Mercury News writes, "Her vocals are strong, clear and convincing as she moves through such winners as 'It's So Easy,' 'Just One Look' and 'Poor Poor Pitiful Me.' And the stunning version of 'Blue Bayou'? Wow. That's one for the time capsule."

Audiophile Audition gives the album 4½ out of 5 stars and has this to say about it in their review. "Linda Ronstadt was a trailblazer. She was a dominant rock and roll singer in a male-dominated genre and stood tall." and "It is a treat to have a recording of this unique talent. The integrity of the audio quality is captured with finesse and verve. The primary instrument, this dazzling voice, is rendered with warmth and subtlety during quieter moments. The muscular fidelity is also on display with tonal vitality."

Coachella Valley Weekly's Eleni P. Austin reviews the album and notes, "The best tracks here display Linda’s seemingly effortless vocal dexterity. The heartbreak of 'Blue Bayou' has never felt so palpable. Roy Orbison’s South of the Border charmer unfurls slowly, lush electric piano, in-the-pocket percussion lachrymose pedal steel and filigreed guitar notes, underscore her yearning tone. She sings the final verse in Spanish, and the results are positively thrilling."

Kevin John Coyne of Country Universe says of the album, "It’s an officially sanctioned, painstakingly mastered keepsake from Ronstadt’s Mad Love tour in 1980, which was broadcast on HBO when it was still a brand new cable channel."

Howard Cohen of the Miami Herald states, "fans will relish finally having live renditions of 'How Do I Make You,' Lowell George's (Little Feat) Willin' and the Eagles' 'Desperado'. They won't get Elvis Costello's 'Party Girl,' the Cretones' 'Mad Love' or her 1969 country-rock staple, 'Silver Threads and Golden Needles,' which had figured on that cooking concert stage."

Phil Bausch concludes his On the Records review with, "It’s important that recordings like Live In Hollywood exist to remind the world Linda Ronstadt once possessed one of the greatest Rock and Pop voices of all time."

== Track listing ==
Side one
No.	Title	Writer(s)	Length
1.	"I Can't Let Go" (Previously unreleased)	Al Gorgoni; Chip Taylor	3:06
2.	"It's So Easy"	Buddy Holly; Norman Petty	2:38
3.	"Willin'" (Previously unreleased)	Lowell George	3:36
4.	"Just One Look" (Previously unreleased)	Doris Troy (aka Doris Payne); Gregory Carroll	3:06
5.	"Blue Bayou"	Joe Melson; Roy Orbison	4:18
6.	"Faithless Love" (Previously unreleased)	JD Souther	3:54

Side two
No.	Title	Writer(s)	Length
7.	"Hurt So Bad" (Previously unreleased)	Bobby Hart; Bobby Weinstein; Teddy Randazzo	3:25
8.	"Poor Poor Pitiful Me"	Warren Zevon	3:53
9.	"You're No Good" (Previously unreleased)	Clint Ballard Jr.	6:12
10.	"How Do I Make You" (Previously unreleased)	Billy Steinberg	2:49
11.	"Back in the U.S.A." (Previously unreleased)	Chuck Berry	2:58
12.	"Desperado" (Previously unreleased)	Don Henley; Glenn Frey	3:44
Total length:			43:39

== Personnel ==
- Linda Ronstadt – lead vocals
- Bill Payne – keyboards
- Kenny Edwards – guitar, banjo, backing vocals
- Dan Dugmore – guitar, pedal steel guitar
- Danny Kortchmar – guitar
- Bob Glaub – bass
- Russ Kunkel – drums
- Peter Asher – percussion, backing vocals
- Wendy Waldman – backing vocals

=== Production ===
- Reissue Producer and Liner Notes – John Boylan
- Executive Producer – Peter Asher
- Recorded and Mixed by Val Garay
- Compilation Engineers – John Boylan, Rob Jacobs and Tim Jaquette.
- Digital Transfers – Craig Anderson and David Dieckmann
- Mastered by Bernie Grundman at Capitol Mastering (Hollywood, California).
- Art Direction and Design – John Kosh
- Cover Photography – Jim Shea
- Product Manager – Kristal Lautalo
- Project Assistance – John Srebalus, Shannon Ward and Rory Wilson.

=== Technical stage/tour personnel ===
- Tour/Production Manager - Eric Barrett
- Stage Manager - Don Forte
- Live Sound Engineer - Buford Jones
- Lighting Design/Engineer - Alan Owen
- Monitor Mixer - Mark Hughes
- Sound Engineer - Al Childress
- Lighting Crew: Craig Campbell; Juan Gonzales; Kelvin Kerr
- Rigger - Stanley Marye

=== Linda Ronstadt crew ===
- Vern Constan - Keyboards and Electronics
- Leroy Kerr - Guitar Technician
- Billy Taylor - Drum Technician
- Edd Kolakowski - Steinway Piano Technician
- Ass'ts. to Ms. Ronstadt: Lois Levine; Deborah Howell

Track information and Personnel credits verified from the album's liner notes.

== Release history ==
Release history and formats for Live in Hollywood
Region	Date	Format	Label	Ref.
North America	February 1, 2019	LP; CD; digital	Rhino Records	
