= Secretly Group =

American independent record label

- Founded: 1996
- Founder: Chris Swanson; Darius Van Arman; Ben Swanson; Eric Weddle; Jonathan Cargill
- Distributor: Secretly Distribution
- Genre: Indie rock
- Country of origin: United States
- Location: Bloomington, Indiana
- Official website: http://secretlygroup.com/

Secretly Group is a family of American independent record labels based in Bloomington, Indiana. The group is made up of Secretly Canadian, Jagjaguwar, and Dead Oceans, as well as a 50% stake in Merge Records. Secretly Canadian, the first of the labels, was formed in 1996 by brothers Chris and Ben Swanson, Eric Weddle, and Jonathan Cargill. Their first release was a re-issue of an album by June Panic. Weddle later left to form label Family Vineyard; the remaining trio were joined by Darius Van Arman, as well as his label Jagjaguwar, in 1999. The two labels had worked closely before Jagjaguwar's offices moved to Bloomington to work alongside Secretly Canadian's.

In February 2007, the partners behind Secretly Canadian and Jagjaguwar, along with Phil Waldorf, former label manager of Misra Records, announced a third label, Dead Oceans. The three labels share offices and staff in Bloomington, IN; however, they maintain distinct and separate aesthetic visions. In June 2013, The Numero Group, an existing re-issuer out of Chicago, joined forces with Secretly Canadian and the collection of labels known as Secretly Group. In 2025, it acquired a 50% stake in the influential independent label Merge Records.

All five labels are distributed by Secretly Group's in-house distribution arm, Secretly Distribution.

== Artists ==
A number of artists have appeared on the four labels over the years.

=== Secretly Canadian ===
- Antony and the Johnsons
- Anohni
- Alasdair Roberts
- Alex Cameron
- Ativin
- Ben Abraham
- Bobb Trimble
- Bodies of Water
- BLK JKS
- Cayucas
- Catfish Haven
- Cherry Glazerr
- Damien Jurado
- Danielson
- David Vandervelde
- Don Lennon
- Dungeonesse
- Early Day Miners
- Electric Youth
- Faye Webster
- Foreign Born
- Frida Hyvonen
- Gardens & Villa
- Havergal
- The Horns of Happiness
- The Impossible Shapes
- Instruments of Science & Technology
- Jason Molina
- jj
- Jens Lekman
- Jorma Whittaker
- June Panic
- I Love You But I've Chosen Darkness
- Little Scream
- Luke Temple
- Magnolia Electric Co.
- Major Lazer
- Marmoset
- Molina and Johnson
- Music Go Music
- Nightlands
- Nite Jewel
- Songs: Ohia
- Porcelain Raft
- Porridge Radio
- Racebannon
- Richard Swift
- Scout Niblett
- serpentwithfeet
- Shura
- Simon Joyner
- Stella Donnelly
- Steven A. Clark
- Suuns
- Swearing at Motorists
- Swell Maps
- Taken By Trees
- Throw Me The Statue
- Tig Notaro
- Tomas Barfod
- The War on Drugs
- Whitney
- Windsor for the Derby
- Woman's Hour
- Yeasayer
- Yoko Ono

=== Jagjaguwar ===
- Angel Olsen
- Aspera
- The Besnard Lakes
- Black Mountain
- Bon Iver
- Briana Marela
- S. Carey
- The Cave Singers
- Company
- Robert Creeley
- The Dead C
- Diana
- Dinosaur Jr.
- Foxygen
- Fuck
- Gayngs
- Gordi
- Jamila Woods
- Julie Doiron
- Ladyhawk
- Lia Ices
- Lightning Dust
- Lonnie Holley
- Love Life
- Manishevitz
- Minus Story
- Moonface
- Moses Sumney
- Mustafa the Poet
- Nad Navillus
- Nagisa ni te
- Nap Eyes
- Odawas
- Okkervil River
- Pink Mountaintops
- Preoccupations
- Richard Youngs
- Sarah White
- Simon Joyner
- Sharon Van Etten
- Small Black
- Sunset Rubdown
- Supreme Dicks
- Swan Lake
- Unknown Mortal Orchestra
- Volcano Choir
- Wilderness
- Wolf People
- Women

=== Dead Oceans ===
- A Place to Bury Strangers
- Akron/Family
- Alex Lahey
- Bear in Heaven
- Better Oblivion Community Center
- Bill Fay
- Bishop Allen
- Bleached
- Bowerbirds
- Brazos
- Bright Eyes
- Califone
- Citay
- Destroyer
- Dirty Projectors
- The Donkeys
- Dub Thompson
- Durand Jones & The Indications
- Evangelicals
- The Explorers Club
- Frog Eyes
- Gauntlet Hair
- Japanese Breakfast
- John Vanderslice
- Julianna Barwick
- Khruangbin
- Kevin Morby
- The Luyas
- Mark McGuire
- Marlon Williams
- Mitski
- Mt. St. Helens Vietnam Band
- Nurses
- On Fillmore
- Phoebe Bridgers
- Phosphorescent
- Ryley Walker
- Shame
- Slowdive
- Strand of Oaks
- Sun Airway
- The Tallest Man on Earth
- These Are Powers
- Tom Rogerson
- Toro y Moi
- White Hinterland

=== Numero Group ===
- Trevor Dandy
- Duster
- Syl Johnson
- Luxury
- Caroline Peyton
- Shoes

== All Flowers Group ==
The All Flowers Group is a label group which is part of the Secretly Group family of record labels.

=== drink sum wtr ===
drink sum wtr is an American independent record label founded in 2022. It operates under the All Flowers Group. drink sum wtr was founded in May 2022 by music executive Nigil Mack, Chris Swanson and Sam Valenti IV. It primarily releases music in genres such as hip hop and R&B. Its first signing was Queens-based rapper Deem Spencer in 2022, followed by poet Aja Monet.

In 2023, drink sum wtr signed Annahstasia, who later released the album Tether and the EP Surface Tension under the label.In 2025, the label signed Yaya Bey, and released her album Do It Afraid. Other artists the label has signed include Gareth Donkin, Your Grandparents, JEMS!, Seafood Sam, Halima, St. Panther, Kari Faux, THEY., Elujay, Aundrey Guillaume, and Say She She.

== See also ==
- List of record labels
