= Chris Barth =

American singer-songwriter (born 1980)

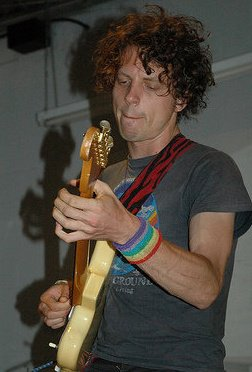

Background information
- Also known as: Normanoak
- Born: Chris Barth; October 30, 1980 (age 46)
- Origin: Indianapolis, IN, U.S.
- Genres: indie, folk, psychedelic
- Occupations: singer-songwriter, performer, guitar teacher, assistant kindergarten teacher
- Instruments: vocals, guitar, bass, drums, keyboards
- Years active: 1998–present
- Labels: Secretly Canadian, Recordhead, Mr. Whiggs, St. Ives, Kill Rock Stars, Magnetic South

Chris Barth is an American singer-songwriter and multi-instrumentalist originally from Indianapolis, IN. He is best known for his work as principal songwriter and lead vocalist of the band The Impossible Shapes, as well as his solo work under his own name and the alias Normanoak. He was also a member of the soul/punk band John Wilkes Booze. He currently resides in Bloomington, Indiana where he performs in a variety of musical projects and works in Early childhood education, writing and performing original music for young children.

== Music career ==
=== Early years ===
Barth began his music career in Indianapolis, forming The Impossible Shapes while still in high school, with friends Aaron Deer and Peter King. They self-released several cassette tapes and performed locally. In 1999 Barth and Deer moved to Bloomington, IN to attend Indiana University and the band expanded to include Mark Rice and Jason Groth. They released their first album The Great Migration in 2000, and followed with Laughter Fills Our Hollow Dome and Bless The Headless, all released by Indianapolis-based labels Recordhead/Mr.Whiggs. Barth also released a solo album on Mr. Whiggs titled Loving Off the Land.

=== With The Impossible Shapes 2003 – 2009 ===
In 2003, The Impossible Shapes signed with Bloomington, IN label Secretly Canadian and released We Like It Wild, touring the U.S. and Europe with Jens Lekman and Songs: Ohia. The Impossible Shapes also shared the stage with Wilco, Guided by Voices, Elf Power, David Berman, U.S. Maple, and Interpol, among others, while garnering acclaim in publications such as Spin, Magnet, and Skyscraper. The band went on to release three more albums on Secretly Canadian, including Horus, Tum, and The Impossible Shapes, playing their final show in July 2009.

=== With John Wilkes Booze ===
In 2001 Barth joined another Bloomington-based band, John Wilkes Booze, playing bass and touring the U.S. with them until 2006, when the band called it quits. The band released two albums with the Olympia, WA based label Kill Rock Stars, and performed with bands such as The White Stripes and The Decemberists.

=== As Normanoak ===
In 2004 Barth released Born A Black Diamond on Secretly Canadian under the name Normanoak. Subsequent Normanoak releases include A Double Gift of Tongues, Estra, and Elixir. Barth toured the U.S. as Normanoak from 2004 to 2008, and Great Britain in 2009, performing with such acts as Vampire Weekend and Calvin Johnson. He continues to perform as Normanoak with a revolving cast of Bloomington musicians.

== Discography ==
=== Chris Barth ===
- Loving Off the Land (Mr. Whiggs 2002)

=== Normanoak ===
- Born a Black Diamond (Secretly Canadian 2004)
- A Double Gift of Tongues (Secretly Canadian 2007)
- Estra (Secretly Canadian 2008)
- Elixir (Magnetic South 2010)

=== The Impossible Shapes ===
- The Great Migration (Recordhead/Mr. Whiggs 2000)
- Laughter Fills Our Hollow Dome (Recordhead/Mr. Whiggs 2002)
- Bless the Headless (Recordhead/Mr. Whiggs 2003)
- The Current (St. Ives 2003)
- We Like It Wild (Secretly Canadian 2003)
- Horus (Secretly Canadian 2005)
- Tum (Secretly Canadian 2006)
- The Impossible Shapes (Secretly Canadian 2008)

=== John Wilkes Booze ===
- Five Pillars of Soul (Kill Rock Stars 2005)
- The Heliocentric Views of John Wilkes Booze (St. Ives 2006)
- Telescopic Eyes Glance the Future Sick (Kill Rock Stars 2006)
