= Aaron Deer =

American singer-songwriter

- Born: November 1, 1980 (age 46)
- Origin: Indianapolis, Indiana, U.S.
- Genres: Indie, Psychedelic
- Occupations: Singer-songwriter, record producer
- Instruments: Vocals, keyboards, piano, guitar, bass
- Years active: 1999–present
- Labels: Secretly Canadian Records, Magnetic South, Kill Rock Stars, Recordhead
- Formerly of: The Horns of Happiness, The Impossible Shapes, John Wilkes Booze, Wee Giant

Aaron Deer (born November 1, 1980) is an American songwriter and multi-instrumentalist originally from Indianapolis, Indiana, United States, now residing in Oakland, California. He is best known for his work in the Bloomington music scene in the early 2000s, playing with bands such as The Impossible Shapes, John Wilkes Booze, and The Horns of Happiness.

In the winter of 2009, Deer relocated to California and continues work with The Horns of Happiness, Royal Geography Society, Farmer Dave Scher and Wee Giant, among others, while co-running the Magnetic South cassette label.

== Career ==
Deer began his music career in Indianapolis, where, along with high school friends Chris Barth and Peter King, The Impossible Shapes was formed. In 1999, Deer and Barth moved to Bloomington to attend Indiana University and they restarted the band there. The group released their first record, "The Great Migration", in 2000 and followed with 2 subsequent releases with Indianapolis-based label Recordhead/Mr.Whiggs.

In 2003, The Impossible Shapes signed with Bloomington label Secretly Canadian released "We Like It Wild" and toured nationally and internationally. Around the same time, John Wilkes Booze was reformed in its classic "Five Pillars of Soul" line-up. After touring the western US in 2004, John Wilkes Booze was signed to Olympia, WA-based Kill Rock Stars. His solo debut by The Horns of Happiness A Sea As a Shore was released by Secretly Canadian in 2004.

In 2005, Deer teamed up with drummer and visual artist Shelley Harrison to form the first performance version of The Horns of Happiness touring extensively through the US, sharing the stage with acts such as Man Man, Silver Jews, Old Time Relijun, Danielson Famile, Joanna Newsom, and The Dirty Projectors, among others, while garnering acclaim in publications such as Magnet, Dusted and Skyscraper magazines.

== Discography ==
=== The Horns of Happiness ===
- A Sea As A Shore (2004)
- Would I Find Your Psychic Guideline EP (2006)
- What Spills Like Thread EP (2007)
- Weathering Alterations Soundtrack (2009)
- The Horns of Happiness EP (2010)
- Be Where Your Aim is Brave & Sound Cassette (2011)

=== Royal Geography Society ===
- Golden Man LP (2011)

=== The Impossible Shapes ===
- The Great Migration (2000)
- Laughter Fills Our Hollow Dome (2002)
- Bless The Headless (2003)
- The Current (2003)
- We Like It Wild (2004)
- Horus (2005)
- TUM (2006)
- The Impossible Shapes (2008)

=== John Wilkes Booze ===
- Summer of Blood cassette (2004)
- Five Pillars of Soul (2005)
- Heliocentric Views of... (2006)

=== Wee Giant ===
- Weetoww (2008)

=== Organization of Robotic Rights Reform ===
- ORRR Audio Awareness Disc (2008)
