= John Wilkes Booze =

American rock band

- Origin: Bloomington, Indiana, U.S.
- Genres: Indie rock, garage rock
- Years active: 1999-2007
- Label: Kill Rock Stars
- Past members: Seth Mahern; Chris Barth; Jason Groth; Mark Rice; Aaron Deer; Eric Weddle; John Dawson; Grant Pershing

John Wilkes Booze was an American rock band from Bloomington, Indiana, active from 1999 to 2007.

== History ==
John Wikes Booze was formed in Bloomington as an outgrowth of the group The Impossible Shapes, and was originally called the John Wilkes Booze Explosion (unrelated to the John Spencer Blues Explosion). The group issued five EPs in 2002, centered around Albert Ayler, Marc Bolan, Patty Hearst, Yoko Ono, and Melvin Van Peebles. The group toured widely in 2003, undergoing a lineup change that year; Mark Rice and Jason Groth left the group, and John Dawson and Grant Pershing joined. Kill Rock Stars compiled tracks from the five EPs onto a CD released in 2004. A new full-length on Kill Rock Stars, Telescopic Eyes Glance the Future Sick, was released in 2005, as was a vinyl-only release, The Heliocentric Views of the John Wilkes Booze, on Secretly Canadian subsidiary label St. Ives. The group disbanded in 2007.

The A.V. Club described the group's sound as "low-boogie riffs" and "bluesy grind", and compared singer Seth Mahern to Jack White.

== Members ==
- Seth Mahern - vocals
- Chris Barth - bass
- Jason Groth - guitar
- Aaron Deer - organ
- John Rice - drums
- Eric Weddle - guitar, saxophone, electronics
- John Dawson - guitar
- Grant Pershing - drums

== Discography ==
- Summer of Blood (Self-released, 2001)
- The Five Pillars of Soul (Kill Rock Stars, 2004)
- Telescopic Eyes Glance the Future Sick (Kill Rock Stars, 2005)
- The Heliocentric Views of the John Wilkes Booze (St. Ives/Secretly Canadian, 2005)
