= June Panic =

American singer-songwriter

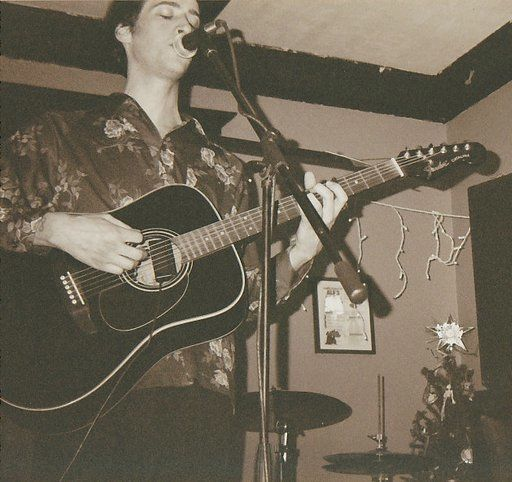
- June Panic live at the Secret Location in Indianapolis, Indiana, in the early 2000s.

Background information
- Born: 1976/1977
- Origin: Grand Forks, North Dakota
- Genres: Indie rock
- Years active: 1990–present
- Label: Secretly Canadian

June Panic (born June G. Preuss; 1976/1977) is an American singer-songwriter from Grand Forks, North Dakota. He has collaborated with musicians such as Heidi Gluck and LonPaul Ellrich (formerly of Marmoset).

== Musical career ==
June Panic first began performing and recording in 1990, and released his early material on cassette tape on his own label 3 Out of 4 Records. He was the first artist ever signed to Bloomington, Indiana-based record label Secretly Canadian, after cofounder Chris Swanson returned to his hometown of Fargo, North Dakota, and heard Panic playing at a strip mall. His 1995 album Glory Hole was reissued by Secretly Canadian in 1996, as their first release. The album was 28 songs in length, and drew inspiration from the 28 categories of ancient Tibetan yogic practices.

In 2002, Panic went on tour with the Impossible Shapes and Songs: Ohia, and later toured Europe with the Impossible Shapes and Jens Lekman. He is a mainstay of the Fargo music scene, regularly performing with artists from outside of the city, including Bon Iver, Low and Haley Bonar, and David Bazan. Panic was a performer at the 2008 Tanned Tin Festival in Castellón, Spain.

June Panic has appeared on several compilation albums, including the 2007 Secretly Canadian compilation SC100, featuring 18 artists signed to the label covering songs by one another. Panic contributed a cover of "Fruitful Weekend" by Danielson Famile, while Nikki Sudden covered Panic's song "Seeing Double".

In 2007, Secretly Canadian released a triple album called Songs From Purgatory containing 48 songs he had originally recorded on a four track and released on cassette between 1991 and 1996. The master tapes, located in Panic's parents' basement in Grand Forks, were damaged in the 1997 Red River flood. Panic was successfully able to salvage material from these tapes, which appeared on Songs From Purgatory, featuring mastering by Kramer.

== Musical style ==
Panic plays every instrument on his releases. His lyrics often contain intentionally twisted or idiosyncratic imagery, a trait noted by reviewers. He has been described as a "literati folk rocker".

== Personal life ==
June Panic has stated that he "essentially grew up overseas", due to his father being in the military.

Panic's wife is also a musician, who plays under the name June Panic's Wife. He has been described as a "born-again queer" by Gregg Shapiro of the Bay Area Reporter.

== Discography ==
- The Incubator's Son (3 Out Of 4, 1990)
- Cicada (3 Out Of 4, 1991)
- The Red Dog Wins Africa (3 Out Of 4, 1991)
- The Red Dog Climbs Mt. Shasta (3 Out Of 4, 1992)
- Ka Number Three (3 Out Of 4, 1992)
- Halfnium (3 Out Of 4, 1993)
- A Bowl Of Fruit (3 Out Of 4, 1993)
- The Red Dog Vs. Virg Foss (3 Out Of 4, 1994)
- Songs From Purgatory (3 Out Of 4, 1994)
- Passive Aggressive (3 Out Of 4, 1994)
- Glory Hole (Secretly Canadian, 1996)
- The Fall of Atom: A Thesis on Entropy (Secretly Canadian, 1998)
- Horror Vacui (Secretly Canadian, 2000)
- Silver Sound Sessions (Super Asbestos, 2001)
- Baby's Breadth (Secretly Canadian, 2002)
- Hope You Fail Better (Secretly Canadian, 2003)
- Bellybuttonless Boy EP (Acuarela Discos, 2006)
- Raising the Canopy Wire (Burnt Toast Vinyl, 2007)
- Songs from Purgatory (Secretly Canadian, 2007)

=== Various Artists Compilation Appearances ===
- Tractor Tunes Volume 1 (2001)
  - "In the Grave"
- Tastemakers (Essay Records, 2006)
- Acuarela Songs 3 (Acuarela Discos, 2007)
  - "Everyone is Saying Hello Again"
- SC100 (Secretly Canadian, 2007)
  - "Fruitful Weekend" (Danielson Famile cover)
