= The Impossible Shapes =

American rock band

- Origin: Indianapolis/Bloomington, IN
- Genres: indie, psychedelic, rock, folk
- Years active: 1998-2009
- Labels: Secretly Canadian, Recordhead, Mr. Whiggs
- Spinoffs: John Wilkes Booze
- Past members: Chris Barth, Aaron Deer, Mark Rice, Jason Groth, Peter King
- Website: www.theimpossibleshapes.com

Not to be confused with Impossible object.

The Impossible Shapes are an independent rock band from Bloomington, Indiana. Since forming in 1998, the band has released eight albums in North America and Europe, sharing the stage with acts such as Wilco, Guided By Voices, Interpol, Danielson Famile, and Jens Lekman, among others, while garnering acclaim in publications such as Spin, Magnet, and Skyscraper magazines.

The band decided to retire in July 2009. Members have included Chris Barth, Aaron Deer, Mark Rice, Jason Groth, and Peter King. Members of the Impossible Shapes have also played in: Normanoak, The Horns of Happiness, Black Cow, John Wilkes Booze, Songs: Ohia, Magnolia Electric Co., and The Coke Dares.

== Discography ==
- The Great Migration (2000)
- Laughter Fills Our Hollow Dome (2002)
- The Current (2002)
- Bless the Headless (2003)
- We Like it Wild (2003)
- Horus (2005)
- Tum (2006)
- The Impossible Shapes (2008)
