= Beware of the Dogs =

Studio album by Stella Donnelly
- Released: 8 March 2019
- Recorded: 2017–2018 in Fremantle, Western Australia and Athens, Georgia
- Genre: Indie pop; indie rock; indie folk
- Length: 42:38
- Label: Secretly Canadian
- Producer: Dean Tuza; Jordan Shakespeare; Drew Vandenberg

Stella Donnelly chronology
Thrush Metal (2017)	Beware of the Dogs (2019)	Flood (2022)

Singles from Beware of the Dogs
- 1. "Old Man" Released: 10 January 2019; 2. "Lunch" Released: 30 January 2019; 3. "Tricks" Released: 1 March 2019

Beware of the Dogs is the debut studio album by Australian indie pop musician Stella Donnelly, released on 8 March 2019 by Secretly Canadian.

The album was nominated for various awards in 2019 and 2020, including Australian Album of the Year for the J Awards and Breakthrough Artist at the ARIA Music Awards. In 2020, the album won Independent Album of the Year and Best Independent Pop Album at the AIR Awards.

== Background ==
In 2017, Stella Donnelly independently released her debut extended play (EP), Thrush Metal, to critical acclaim She signed to Secretly Canadian in February 2018, and the EP was re-released by the label that June. One song off of Thrush Metal, "Boys Will Be Boys", was included on Beware of the Dogs.

== Composition ==
Across the record, Donnelly lyrically confronts issues including toxic masculinity, rape culture and her experiences with sexism from working in hospitality. For example, "Old Man" was written at the beginning of the #MeToo movement, when she felt "the world chang[ing] right before her eyes" as the "men who had exploited their power for so long were actually being held accountable for their actions". Her songs also observe Australian culture and criticise nationalism, with "Season's Greetings" about an awkward Christmas party in the summer heat, and "Tricks" calling out items like Southern Cross tattoos and the Kyle and Jackie O Show. Similarly, the title track is about "historic and continuing racism that flows through the Australian media and government".

== Release and promotion ==
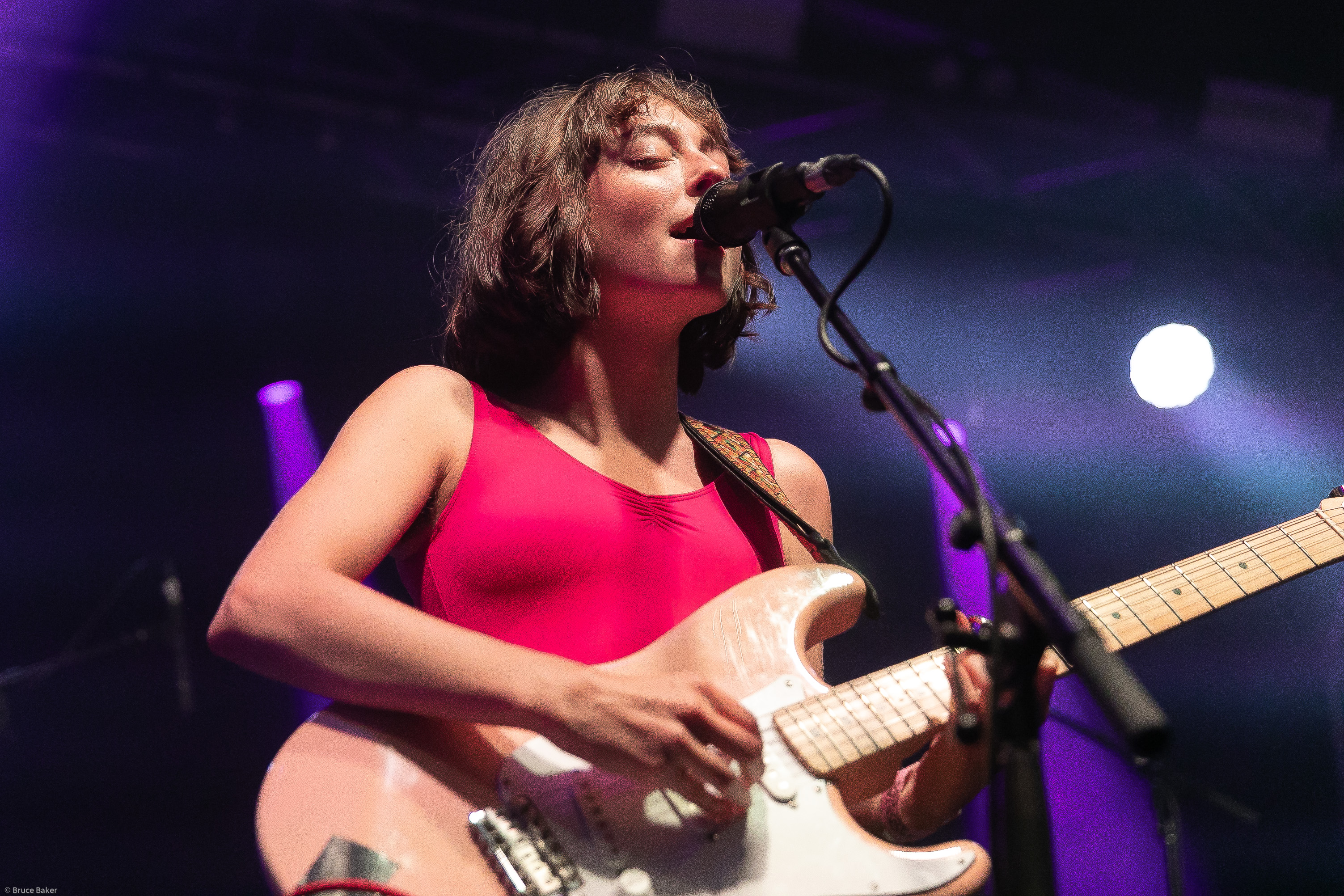
Donnelly performing in 2019

On 10 January 2019, Donnelly released the lead single "Old Man" and announced the album's title, artwork and release date. The second single, "Lunch", was issued on 30 January. She called it her favourite song on the album. On 27 February, she released the third and final single, "Tricks", before the full album released on 8 March 2019. Beware of the Dogs debuted at number 15 on the ARIA Charts, and at number 21 on the UK Independent Albums chart.

In September, Donnelly and her band embarked on the Beware of the Dogs Australian Tour with 16 shows across capital and regional cities.

== Critical reception ==
Professional ratings
Aggregate scores
Source	Rating
AnyDecentMusic?	8.0/10
Metacritic	81/100
Review scores
Source	Rating
AllMusic	3.5/5 stars
Consequence of Sound	B+
Exclaim!	9/10
The Guardian	4/5 stars
NME	4/5 stars
Pitchfork	7.6/10
Q	4/5 stars
Rolling Stone	4/5 stars
Uncut	7/10
Vice (Expert Witness)	A−

Many reviewers praised Donnelly's songwriting and the album's discussion of topics like the #MeToo movement and toxic masculinity. For NME, Hannah Mylrea wrote the record is "an enthralling and deeply relevant debut", praising its "searing lyrics" and playfulness. Jon Dolan of Rolling Stone commended its composition, writing "the glazed guitars, sunny Casio beat and pure spirit of her songwriting keeps her shaky reality rolling forward."

Olivia Horn of Pitchfork wrote that Stella's music is "empathetic to the core", and praised her "impressively dexterous voice, which she puts to work in service of some of her album’s most winsome moments."

Reviewing for Vice, Robert Christgau said the album is, "in plain English and unassuming soprano, a musical encyclopedia of assholes, all male not just because she's female but because assholes generally are."

== Track listing ==
All tracks written by Stella Donnelly and produced by Dean Tuza, unless otherwise noted.

No.	Title	Producer	Length
1.	"Old Man"		3:33
2.	"Mosquito"		3:11
3.	"Season's Greetings"		2:49
4.	"Allergies"		2:55
5.	"Tricks"		4:07
6.	"Boys Will Be Boys"	Jordan Shakespeare	4:04
7.	"Lunch"		3:40
8.	"Bistro"		2:03
9.	"Die"		2:54
10.	"Beware of the Dogs"		3:35
11.	"U Owe Me"	Drew Vandenberg	2:40
12.	"Watching Telly"		4:45
13.	"Face It"		2:16
Total length:			42:38

Notes

- "Boys Will Be Boys" previously appeared on Donnelly's debut EP, Thrush Metal (2017).

== Personnel ==
Musicians

- Stella Donnelly – lead vocals, writing (all tracks); bass guitar (track 2), guitar (tracks 1–7, 10–11, 13), percussion (track 1), piano (tracks 2–3, 10–11), synth (tracks 7–9, 12–13)
- Jennifer Aslett – bass guitar (tracks 1, 3, 5, 8–10, 12), guitar (track 7), backing vocals (track 12)
- Indigo Foster-Tuke – backing vocals (track 12)
- Miranda Murray Yong – cello (track 7)
- George Foster – drums (track 7), guitar (tracks 1, 3, 5, 8, 10), synth (track 12)
- Talya Valenti – drums (tracks 1, 3, 5, 8–10, 12), percussion (tracks 1, 3, 7, 12), backing vocals (track 12)
- Dean Tuza – drum machine (track 9)

Technical

- Dean Tuza – producer, engineering, recording
- Stella Donnelly – additional production
- Jordan Shakespeare – producer, recording (track 6); mixing (track 6)
- Drew Vandenberg – producer, recording (track 11)
- Ewan Pearson – mixing (tracks 1–5, 8–13)
- Tony Espie – mixing (track 7)
- Matt Colton – mastering

Promotional

- Pooneh Ghana – cover photography
- Nathaniel David Utesch – design

== Charts ==
Chart (2019)	Peak position
Australian Albums (ARIA)	15
UK Independent Albums (OCC)	21
US Heatseekers Albums (Billboard)	16
US Independent Albums (Billboard)	43
