= Flood (Stella Donnelly album) =

Studio album by Stella Donnelly
- Released: 26 August 2022
- Recorded: 2021
- Studios: RADA Studios, West Perth; Fremantle Recording Studios, O'Connor; Tunafish, O'Connor; The Waffle Pad, Castlemaine
- Genre: Indie rock
- Length: 38:54
- Label: Secretly Canadian
- Producers: Stella Donnelly; Jake Webb; Anna Laverty

Stella Donnelly chronology
Beware of the Dogs (2019)	Flood (2022)	Love and Fortune (2025)

Singles from Flood
- 1. "Lungs" Released: 10 May 2022; 2. "Flood" Released: 21 June 2022; 3. "How Was Your Day?" Released: 3 August 2022

Flood is the second studio album by Welsh-Australian musician Stella Donnelly, released on 26 August 2022 by Secretly Canadian. It was written while travelling around Australia before and during the COVID-19 pandemic, with its lyricism a product of "hard months of introspection, and a lot of transition". Flood was supported by three singles and an international tour from September 2022 until April 2023.

The album received critical acclaim and peaked at number 29 on the ARIA albums chart. In 2023, Flood was shortlisted for the Welsh Music Prize.

== Background ==
Following the success of her 2019 debut studio album Beware of the Dogs, Donnelly moved around the country amidst the COVID-19 pandemic and wrote as much as 43 songs during the travel. She became obsessed with birdwatching and became an ambassador for BirdLife Australia in 2021.

Flood is described by Donnelly as the product of "months of risky experimentation, hard months of introspection, and a lot of transition". The songwriting is set to involve discussion of "relationships, be them familial, romantic or platonic", with the artist explaining her interest in "observing human dynamics".

== Release and promotion ==
=== Singles ===
On 10 May 2022, Donnelly premiered lead single "Lungs" live on Triple J, and announced the release date for Flood of 26 August 2022. A music video for the song was also released, directed by herself and Duncan Wright. The title track "Flood" was released as the second single on 21 June 2022. Third single "How Was Your Day?" was released on 3 August 2022.

=== Tour ===
Donnelly embarked on the Flood World Tour on 11 September 2022, but performed two legs around Europe prior, supporting Australian band Rolling Blackouts Coastal Fever on their tour for 26 shows. The first leg of the Flood World Tour consisted of 14 shows in North America from September to October. She travelled to the United Kingdom and Ireland to perform nine shows in November, and then seven across Europe. Donnelly then played five shows in Japan and Seoul from November to December 2022.

Beginning in February 2023, the Australian leg of the tour had a number of shows in New South Wales cancelled due to medical issues. She concluded the tour on 1 April 2023 in Margaret River, Western Australia, having completed almost 70 shows in total.

== Critical reception ==
Professional ratings
Aggregate scores
Source	Rating
Metacritic	79/100
Review scores
Source	Rating
The Guardian	4/5 stars
And It Don't Stop	A−
The Line of Best Fit	9/10
Paste	8.2/10
Pitchfork	7.7/10
NME	4/5 stars

According to Metacritic, Flood has received "generally favourable reviews". Laura Snapes of Pitchfork praised the album for exploring "how we seek and create safety, which she essays with captivating tenderness". Rhian Daly of NME, in a four-star review, called it a "beautiful, thought-provoking" album, containing "soft, lush pieces that deep-dive into life's everyday moments and turn them into something extraordinary". Writing for The Guardian, Giselle Au-Nhien Nguyen called Flood "awash with vivid imagery", "deeply personal" and wrote "while Flood is overall darker than the musician's past work, there's still a lot of joy to be found".

List of appearances on year-end lists
Publication	List	Rank	Ref.
Far Out	50 Best Albums of 2022	38	
Gigwise	51 Best Albums of 2022	33	
Under the Radar	100 Best Albums of 2022	20	

== Track listing ==
All tracks written by Stella Donnelly; "Move Me" co-written by Joe Russo. All tracks produced by Donnelly and Anna Laverty, unless otherwise noted.

Flood track listing
No.	Title	Producer(s)	Length
1.	"Lungs"	Stella Donnelly; Jake Webb	3:31
2.	"How Was Your Day?"		2:32
3.	"Restricted Account"		4:08
4.	"Underwater"		4:57
5.	"Medals"		4:05
6.	"Move Me"		3:07
7.	"Flood"	Donnelly	3:43
8.	"This Week"		2:52
9.	"Oh My My My"		3:13
10.	"Morning Silence"	Donnelly	2:10
11.	"Cold"	Donnelly; Webb	4:36
Total length:			38:54

== Personnel ==
Musicians

- Stella Donnelly – vocals, piano (tracks 1, 4, 6–8, 10), synth (tracks 1, 8, 9), guitar (tracks 2, 3, 5, 9, 10), lap steel (track 2), xylophone (tracks 3, 9), writing, producer
- Jack Arnett – saxophone (track 5)
- Jeniffer Aslett – bass (tracks 1–8, 11), backing vocals (tracks 5–7)
- George Foster – piano (tracks 1, 3, 9), guitar (tracks 2–5, 7, 10), acoustic guitar (track 6), backing vocals (tracks 2, 5–7), drums (track 3)
- Jack Gaby – guitar (tracks 1, 6, 9), piano (tracks 2, 5), backing vocals (tracks 2, 4–7), synth (tracks 5, 7, 10), lap steel (track 6), drum machine (track 8)
- Broderick Madden-Scott – backing vocals (tracks 6, 7)
- Joe Russo – writing (track 6)
- Thom Stewart – backing vocals (tracks 2, 8, 9)
- Marcel Tussie – drums and percussion (tracks 1, 2, 5–8, 11), backing vocals (track 2)
- Julia Wallace – fluegelhorn (tracks 3, 5, 6, 8, 9), backing vocals (tracks 6, 7)
- Jake Webb – guitar (track 10)

Technical

- Jack Arnett – studio assistant (tracks 2–5)
- Anna Laverty – producer (tracks 2–6, 8, 9)
- Broderick Madden-Scott – engineer (tracks 1, 2, 6, 7, 11)
- Lesse Marhaug – mixing
- Stephan Mathieu – mastering
- Jordan Shakespeare – studio assistant (tracks 2–5)
- Jake Webb – producer (tracks 1, 11)

Promotional

- Emma Daisy – photography
- Tom Hunt – artwork photography
- Miles Johnson – cover art
- Olivia Senior – photography

== Charts ==
Chart performance for Flood
Chart (2022)	Peak position
Australian Albums (ARIA)	29
Scottish Albums (Official Charts)	56
UK Independent Albums (Official Charts)	13

== Release history ==
Release history and formats for Flood
Region	Date	Format	Catalogue	Label	Ref.
Various	26 August 2022	Digital download; streaming	Not applicable	Secretly Canadian	
Australia	26 August 2022	Cassette; CD; LP	SC432	Secretly Canadian	
Various	9 September 2022	Cassette; CD; LP	SC432	Secretly Canadian	
