= Thrush Metal =

EP by Stella Donnelly
- Released: 6 April 2017
- Genre: Folk-pop; lo-fi
- Length: 18:01
- Label: Healthy Tapes; Secretly Canadian
- Producer: Jordan Shakespeare

Stella Donnelly chronology
Thrush Metal (2017)	Beware of the Dogs (2019)

Thrush Metal is the debut extended play (EP) by Australian singer-songwriter Stella Donnelly, self-released on 6 April 2017 digitally and on cassette. Consisting of five acoustic demo tracks, the EP received critical acclaim and led to Donnelly's signing with Secretly Canadian who issued its first vinyl pressing.

At the 2017 West Australian Music Industry Awards, Thrush Metal won Best EP, with Donnelly winning four other awards including Best Popular New Act and Best Female Vocalist.

== Background and composition ==
Prior to releasing music, Stella Donnelly was playing in a few bands and working two hospitality jobs in Fremantle. In 2017, she recorded the five tracks on Thrush Metal as demos with just her guitar in her boyfriend's lounge room. She intended them to sound "as raw as possible and authentic to how [she] would sound live".

Donnelly wrote "Boys Will Be Boys" in 2016 after her friend was raped, and when conversations about sexual assault were "far less frequent". She said writing the song was cathartic and helped her "relieve a lot of the shame that victims are so often forced to feel in silence". Her own experiences of sexism working in hospitality inspired the opening track "Mechanical Bull". According to Shaad D'Souza of music publication Pitchfork, Thrush Metal "cast[s] a disdainful eye on every manner of shitty man, from the abusive ones, to the manipulative ones, to the ones who are just plain mean".

== Release and promotion ==
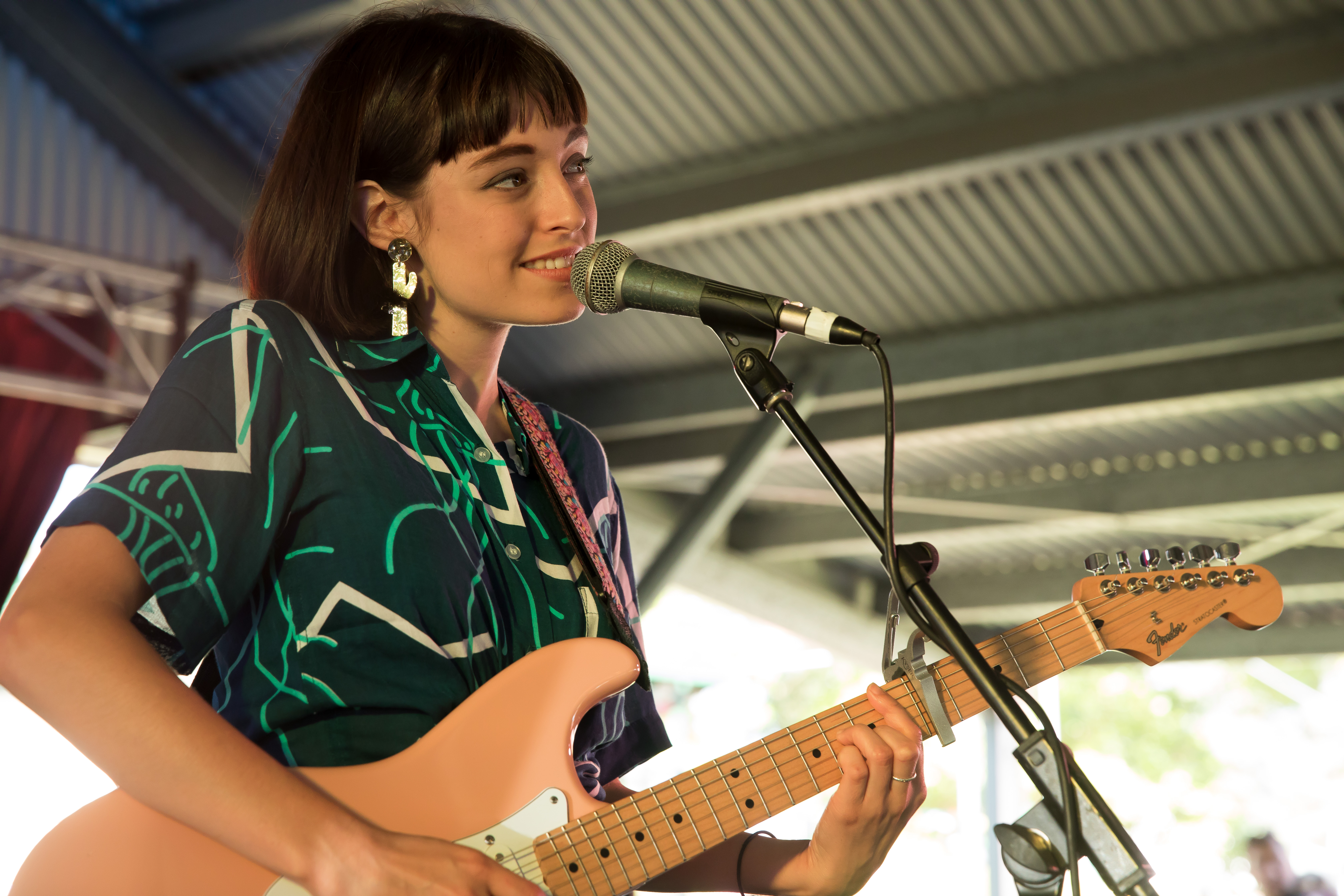
Donnelly performing in 2017.

Donnelly released Thrush Metal independently on 6 April 2017 to Bandcamp. A limited run of 30 cassette tapes was issued by Healthy Tapes, who, unbeknownst to the musician, also uploaded the EP to Spotify. After the streaming platform added "Mechanical Bull" to an influential playlist, Donnelly was contacted by dozens of labels and managers. She embarked on an Australian tour for the EP in August 2017. Later that year, she won Levi's Music Prize at Bigsound 2017, and took out Triple J Unearthed Artist of the Year after "Mechanical Bull" was her first song to be added on Triple J's full rotation.

In February 2018, Donnelly signed with Secretly Canadian, and later that June, the label released the EP on vinyl for the first time, packaged with a bonus track entitled "Talking".

== Critical reception ==
Thrush Metal was released to critical acclaim. Reviewing for Exclaim!, Paul Blinov called the EP as "showcase [of] the nascent talent of a songwriter with her ear trained on the here and now". Joseph Purchell of Secret Meeting said it was an "incredible starting point for Donnelly, and one which suggests she could be a vital voice moving forward through her ability to harness deep emotional turmoil into beautifully haunting music".

At the 2017 West Australian Music Industry Awards, Donnelly won five awards from Thrush Metal, including Best EP and Best Single for "Mechanical Bull". She was also named Best Female Vocalist and Most Popular New Act.

== Track listing ==
Digital and cassette track listing
No.	Title	Length
1.	"Mechanical Bull"	2:41
2.	"Boys Will Be Boys"	4:02
3.	"Mean to Me"	4:21
4.	"Grey"	3:10
5.	"A Poem"	3:46
Total length:		18:01

LP track listing
No.	Title	Length
6.	"Talking"	3:11
Total length:		21:12

== Release history ==
List of release formats for Thrush Metal
Region	Date	Format	Label	Ref.
Australia, New Zealand	6 April 2017	Cassette; digital download	Healthy Tapes	
Various	25 August 2017	Streaming	Healthy Tapes	
United States	22 June 2018	LP record	Secretly Canadian	
