= Yellow Pills: Prefill =

Yellow Pills : Prefill

Compilation album by Various artists
- Released: 2005
- Genre: Power pop
- Label: The Numero Group
- Producer: Tom Lunt, Ken Shipley, Rob Sevier, Jordan Oakes

Various artists chronology
Eccentric Soul: The Bandit Label (2004)	Yellow Pills : Prefill (2005)	Fern Jones: The Glory Road (2005)

Professional ratings
Review scores
Source	Rating
Allmusic	4.5/5 stars
Pitchfork Media	(8.8/10)

Yellow Pills: Prefill is the fourth release by The Numero Group. Compiled with the help of Jordan Oakes, Yellow Pills takes a look at some overlooked pop tracks from 1979-1982.

== Track listing ==
Side A

1. "Green Hearts" - Luxury
2. "I Need That Record" - Tweeds
3. "All I Want" - Colors
4. "You Need Pop" - Speedies
5. "Like I Told You" - Shoes
6. "In and Out of Love" - Sponsors
7. "Not My Girl Anymore" - Bats
8. "She's The Girl (Who Said No)" - Tweeds
9. "Somebody Else's Girl" - Randy Winburn
10. "One in a Million" - Luxury
11. "Sun" - Toms
12. "Countdown" - Luxury
13. "Rave It Up" - Colors
14. "1-2-3" - Speedies
15. "Hey Little Girl" - Kids
16. "Mr. Peculiar" - Bats

Side B

1. "(I Wanna Be A) Teen Again" - Toms
2. "Not Easy For Me" - Bats
3. "Julie-Anne" - Treble Boys
4. "Dream Rocker" - Tommy Rock
5. "Love I Can't Wait" - Sponsors
6. "Growing Up American" - Colors
7. "Hello Mr. Jenkins" Finns
8. "Things I Am" - Tactics
9. "One Kiss" - Treble Boys
10. "She's Hi-Fi" - Trend
11. "Forever Through the Sun" - LMNOP
12. "Good Time Music" - Jack Stack A Track
13. "Sunshine U.S.A." - Randy Winburn
14. "House Of Horrors" - Toms
15. "Long Time Away" - Brat
16. "There Goes My Heart Again" - Kids
17. "(I Feel Like A) Dictionary" - Trend
