= Melody Inn (nightclub) =

Bar and live music venue in Indianapolis, Indiana, US

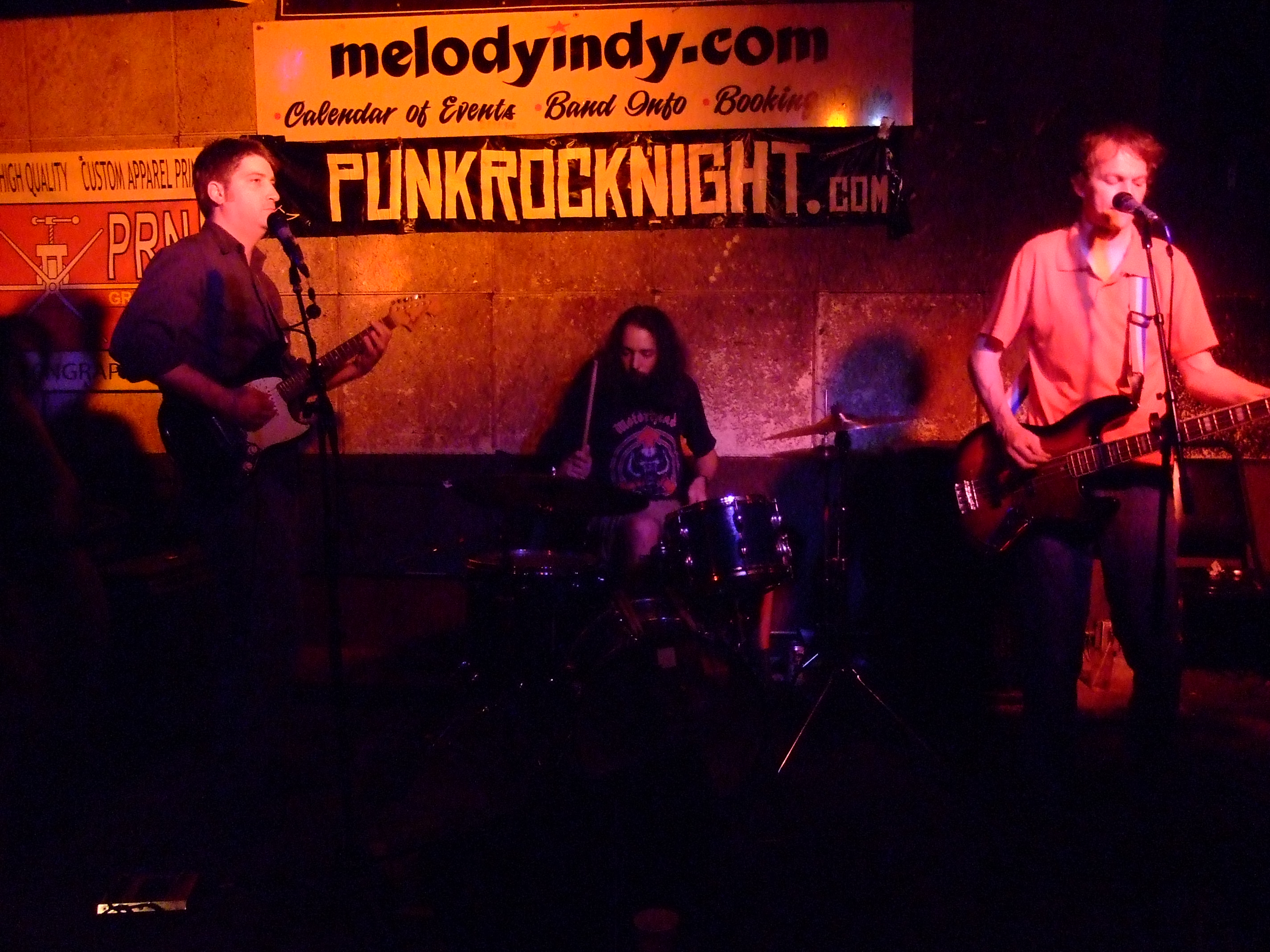
- Marmoset playing at the Melody Inn in 2008
- Interactive map of Melody Inn

Restaurant information
- Established: 1935
- Owners: Dave Brown; Rob Ondrish
- Dress code: casual
- Location: 3826 North Illinois Street, Indianapolis, Marion, Indiana, 46208, United States
- Coordinates: 39°49′32.1″N 86°9′34.1″W
- Seating capacity: 125
- Other locations: none

The Melody Inn (also known as The Mel) is a bar and live music club in the Butler-Tarkington neighborhood of Indianapolis, Indiana, United States. It is estimated that over 7,000 bands and musical acts have played the Melody Inn since 2001.

== History ==
The Melody Inn opened in 1935 as a piano bar. It was owned by Lou Swain. In the 1980s, the Melody Inn served lunch and dinner.

In 2001, it was purchased by Dave Brown and Rob Ondrish, both whom had never run their own business before owning the bar. Ondrish worked at the Melody Inn in the 1980s. In 1995, Ondrish met Brown at BMG Music, where they were both working. The two would visit the Melody Inn together. Ondrish started working part-time at the bar again. Brown started working there, too. The owner told Brown he wanted to sell the business. Brown proposed buying the bar to Ondrish, and they agreed. They signed a contract and made monthly payments on the bar. They became owners of the Melody Inn in October 2001.

Their first customers were the Manion family on October 2. The family had a history as regulars at the bar, and they wanted to have a drink in memory of Bill Manion, who had died of a brain tumor. A United States one-dollar bill is framed above the bar, signed by the family.

Brown and Ondrish worked every shift at the Melody Inn during the first year. Today, the Melody Inn is described as a dive bar. The stage is 18 inches high and broken guitars, instruments, and art decorate the walls. Portraits of Brown's aunt and uncle hang in the bar. His uncle had his bachelor party at the Melody Inn in 1955. The bar is small. It has four tables, four booths and handful of barstools. The booths came from the Teepee Restaurant and the bar is made of oak wood. The majority of the interior is original, including the flooring, metalwork and a large mirror that hangs. There is a beer garden in the back. The Melody Inn is open every day of the week. It has been named Indianapolis' favorite punk rock bar seven years in a row in Nuvo Newsweekly's readers.

== Music ==
Over 7,000 musical acts have performed at the bar since 2001. Performers include The Reverend Peyton's Big Damn Band, who debuted at the bar, Margot & the Nuclear So and So's, She Wants Revenge, and the Brain Surgeons. Every second Tuesday is Broke(n), a monthly drum and bass night, which had been held weekly at the Melody Inn since 2005. From 7:30 until about 9:30 is "Hillbilly Happy Hour". Every Saturday night is "Punk Rock Night" at the Melody Inn. Punk Rock Night started as a weekly Sunday event in October 2000 by promoter Greg Brenner.

In 2013, the bar held a fundraiser for Norton Records. The record label, based in New York City, had the majority of its vinyl record inventory destroyed by Hurricane Sandy. Cheetah Chrome headlined.

== Recognition ==
- 2013 - "Best Bar/Restaurant/Venue for punks", Nuvo Newsweekly

== See also ==
- List of attractions and events in Indianapolis
