= Camino Del Sol =

Compilation album by Antena
- Released: 2004
- Genre: Bossa nova; post-punk; electro-pop
- Label: The Numero Group
- Producer: Tom Lunt, Ken Shipley, Rob Sevier

Antena chronology
Eccentric Soul: The Capsoul Label (2004)	Camino Del Sol (2004)	Eccentric Soul: The Bandit Label (2004)

Professional ratings
Review scores
Source	Rating
AllMusic	4/5 stars
Pitchfork Media	(9.0/10)

Camino Del Sol is the second compilation album by Antena based on a mini-album originally released in September 1982. Released by The Numero Group as NUM002, it features tracks by the French-Belgian trio who were then signed to Belgian label Les Disques Du Crepuscule. Antena featured Isabelle Antena, a pseudonym for Isabelle Powaga, who is a cult figure known for her song "Say I Believe In It." The re-release contains re-mastered tracks, B-sides and two previously unreleased songs.

== Track listing ==
1. Camino Del Sol
2. To Climb the Cliff
3. Silly Things
4. Sissexa
5. Achilles
6. Bye Bye Papaye
7. Noelle a Hawaii
8. Les Demoiselles De Rochefort
9. Spiral Staircase
10. Unable
11. The Boy from Ipanema
12. Seaside Weekend
13. Frantz
14. Ingenuous
