= Eccentric Soul: The Bandit Label =

The Bandit Label

Compilation album by Various artists
- Released: 2004
- Genre: Soul, R&B
- Label: The Numero Group
- Producer: Tom Lunt, Ken Shipley, Rob Sevier

Various artists chronology
Antena: Camino Del Sol (2004)	The Bandit Label (2004)	Yellow Pills: Prefill (2005)

Professional ratings
Review scores
Source	Rating
Allmusic	4/5 stars
Pitchfork Media	(7.9/10)

Eccentric Soul: The Bandit Label is the third compilation by The Numero Group and second volume in the Eccentric Soul series.

Eccentric Soul: The Bandit Label took a look at the underside of Chicago soul through twenty tracks of R&B, soul, and funk. The album followed the story of the fledgling Bandit label and its leader, Arrow Brown.

== Track listing ==
1. "One More Time Around" - The Majestic Arrows
2. "We Have Love" - The Majestic Arrows
3. "Another Day" - The Majestic Arrows
4. "If You Love Me" - Altyrone Deno Brown
5. "You've Got to Crawl to Me" - Johnnie Davis
6. "Boogedy Boogedy" - Johnnie Davis and The Majestic Arrows
7. "Doing It for Us" - The Majestic Arrows
8. "Love Is All I Need" - The Majestic Arrows
9. "Glad About That" - Linda Ballentine
10. "Bring Back the One I Love" - The Majestic Arrows
11. "The Magic of Your Love" - The Majestic Arrows
12. "I'll Never Cry for Another Boy" - The Majestic Arrows
13. "Sweet Pea" - Altyrone Deno Brown
14. "The Love I See Now" - Johnnie Davis and The Majestic Arrows
15. "We Love Together" - The Majestic Arrows
16. "You're a Habit Hard to Break" - Linda Ballentine
17. "Going to Make a Time Machine" - The Majestic Arrows

=== Extended play ===
- 18. "If I Had a Little Love" - The Majestic Arrows
- 19. "Make Yourself Over" (Rehearsal) - The Majestic Arrows
- 20. "I'll Never Cry for Another Boy" (Rehearsal) - The Majestic Arrows
