= Marion Black =

- Genres: Soul; Funk
- Occupation: Musician
- Instrument: Vocals
- Years active: 1969 — 1973 (aprox.)
- Labels: Capsoul; Shakat Records; Rome

Marion Black is an American soul singer and songwriter from Columbus, Ohio, best known for his 1970 song "Who Knows".

== Biography ==
Black's career began in 1969, when he approached local music operator Bill Moss, with his self-penned song "Who Knows". The resultant single launched Moss's Capsoul record label. The A-side, "Go On Fool", became a minor hit in 1971, peaking at #39 on the US Billboard R&B chart. Black continued his job as a head waiter at the time of the release, and only toured lightly in support of the single.

After a dispute over royalties with Capsoul founder Bill Moss, Black left Capsoul for another local label, Prix Records, where he later recorded at Harmonic Sounds studio. His releases there included "Listen Black Brother", "I'm Gonna Get Loaded", and "(More Love) Is All We Need", none of which achieved commercial success.

Later in the 1970s, Black recorded at Jack Casey's Rome Studio on East Broad Street, which yielded another nationally distributed single, "Off The Critical List" on Shakat Records.

Three decades later, a tape with a previously unreleased song entitled "Come On and Gettit" was found at an estate sale in Columbus.

It's assumed that Black stopped working on the music industry during the 1970s and instead continued working as the head waiter at the Holiday Inn in Columbus. He retired in 1995, after having worked at the restaurant for 25 years.

Black's recordings have been featured on two compilation albums issued by The Numero Group. He is represented on Eccentric Soul: The Capsoul Label (2004) by two tracks, "Who Knows" and "Go On Fool". The compilation Eccentric Soul: The Prix Label (2007) features "Listen Black Brother", along with Black's unreleased track "Come On and Gettit".

"Who Knows" was later sampled by the American musician RJD2 in the song "Smoke and Mirrors", from his 2002 album Deadringer. It was also featured on the 2005 soundtrack album Weeds: Music from the Original Series from the first season of Weeds.

== In popular culture ==
"Who Knows" was played behind the closing credits of the 2006 documentary film Who Killed the Electric Car?.

In February 2013, "Who Knows" was featured on a TV BlackBerry advertisement shown during the U.S. Super Bowl game.

"Who Knows" was featured in season 2, episode 7 of Hulu's Original Series Casual.

"Who Knows" was featured at the end of Michael Moore's "Rumble" podcast (episode 248: "Forget Me Not").

"Who Knows" was featured at the end of episode 4 of the first season of Bad Sisters on HBO.

"Who Knows" was featured at the end and behind the closing credits of episode 6 of Netflix's miniseries Griselda.

"Who Knows" was also featured in episode 8 of the second season of Apple TV's show Severance.

In September 2022, "Who Knows" was featured in the French crime series Astrid et Raphaëlle (also known as Astrid: Murder in Paris in some regions). It appears in the Season 3, Episode 4, titled "La Chambre Ouverte" ("The Open Room").

In November 2024, "Who Knows" was featured on a TV commercial for The Farmer's Dog.

== Discography ==
| Title (A-side/B-side) | Label | Year |
|---|---|---|
| "Go on Fool" / "Who Knows" | Capsoul CS-20; Avco Embassy AVE-4559 | 1970 |
| "I'm Gonna Get Loaded" / "You're Not Alone" | Prix HSI-7102 | 1971 |
| "Listen Black Brother, Part 1" / "Listen Black Brother, Part 2" | Prix HSI-7201 | 1972 |
| "(More Love) Is All We Need" / "(More Love) Is All We Need (Instrumental)" | Prix HSI-7302 | 1973 |
| "Off The Critical List, Part 1" / "Off The Critical List, Part 2" | Starr SF-1046; Shakat SH-705 | 1973 |
| "He Kept It For His Self" / "You Don't Want Me" | Rome RF-7146 | 2025 |
