= Music Go Music =

- Genres: Pop rock
- Years active: 2009-present
- Labels: Secretly Canadian
- Members: Kamar Maza; Gala Bell; Torg
- Website: MusicGoMusic.comLINK IS DEAD

Music Go Music are an American pop rock band from Los Angeles, California, United States, signed to the independent record label Secretly Canadian. The band members use the pseudonyms Kamar Maza, Gala Bell, and Torg, who are David Metcalf, Meredith Metcalf, and Adam Siegel, respectively, of the indie-rock band Bodies of Water. Their sound has been compared to ABBA and ELO.

The band first appeared in 2008 with a series of 12-inch vinyl releases, each featuring three songs. The songs on the EPs were later collected into their debut full-length album Expressions.

On September 24, 2013, the band released their first single, "Love Is All I Can Hear," from their second album, Impressions.

== Discography ==
=== Albums ===
- Expressions (2009)
- Impressions (2014)

=== EPs ===
- Light of Love (2008)
- Reach out (2008)
- Warm in the Shadows (2009)

=== Singles ===
- "Love Is All I Can Hear" (2013)
