= Eccentric Soul: The Capsoul Label =

The Capsoul Label

Compilation album by Various artists
- Released: 2004
- Genre: Soul, R&B
- Label: The Numero Group
- Producer: Tom Lunt, Ken Shipley, Rob Sevier

Various artists chronology
The Capsoul Label (2004)	Antena: Camino Del Sol (2004)

Professional ratings
Review scores
Source	Rating
Allmusic	4/5 stars

Eccentric Soul: The Capsoul Label is the first compilation album by The Numero Group and first volume in the Eccentric Soul series.

Short for Capital City Soul, the Columbus, Ohio Capsoul label's history spans only five years throughout the 1970s. Founded by Bill Moss, a local singer and DJ at WVKO in Columbus, Capsoul released just a dozen 45's and one highly sought after LP resulting in a few regional hits. Eccentric Soul: The Capsoul Label is a compilation of nineteen tracks spanning the label's all but forgotten history.

== Track listing ==
1. "You're All I Need to Make It" - Johnson, Hawkins, Tatum & Durr
2. "Who Knows" - Marion Black
3. "I'm Gonna Keep on Loving You" - Kool Blues
4. "Sock It to 'Em Soul Brother" - Bill Moss
5. "Too Far Gone" - Four Mints
6. "You Can't Blame Me" - Johnson, Hawkins, Tatum & Durr
7. "Number One" - Bill Moss
8. "Row My Boat" - Four Mints
9. "Without Love" - Ronnie Taylor
10. "I Want To Be Ready" - Kool Blues
11. "Your Love Keeps Drawing Me Closer" - Johnson, Hawkins, Tatum & Durr
12. "Hot Grits!!!" - Elijah & The Ebonites
13. "I Can't Take It" - Ronnie Taylor
14. "Can We Try Love Again" - Kool Blues
15. "You're My Desire" - Four Mints
16. "A World Without You" - Johnson, Hawkins, Tatum & Durr
17. "Go On Fool" - Marion Black

Extended Play:
18. "Pure Soul" - Elijah & the Ebonites
19." Sock It To 'Em Soul Brother (Instrumental)" - Bill Moss
20. "All I Need To Make It (Instrumental)" - Capsoul Group (vinyl only track)
