= The Reverend Peyton's Big Damn Band =

American country blues band

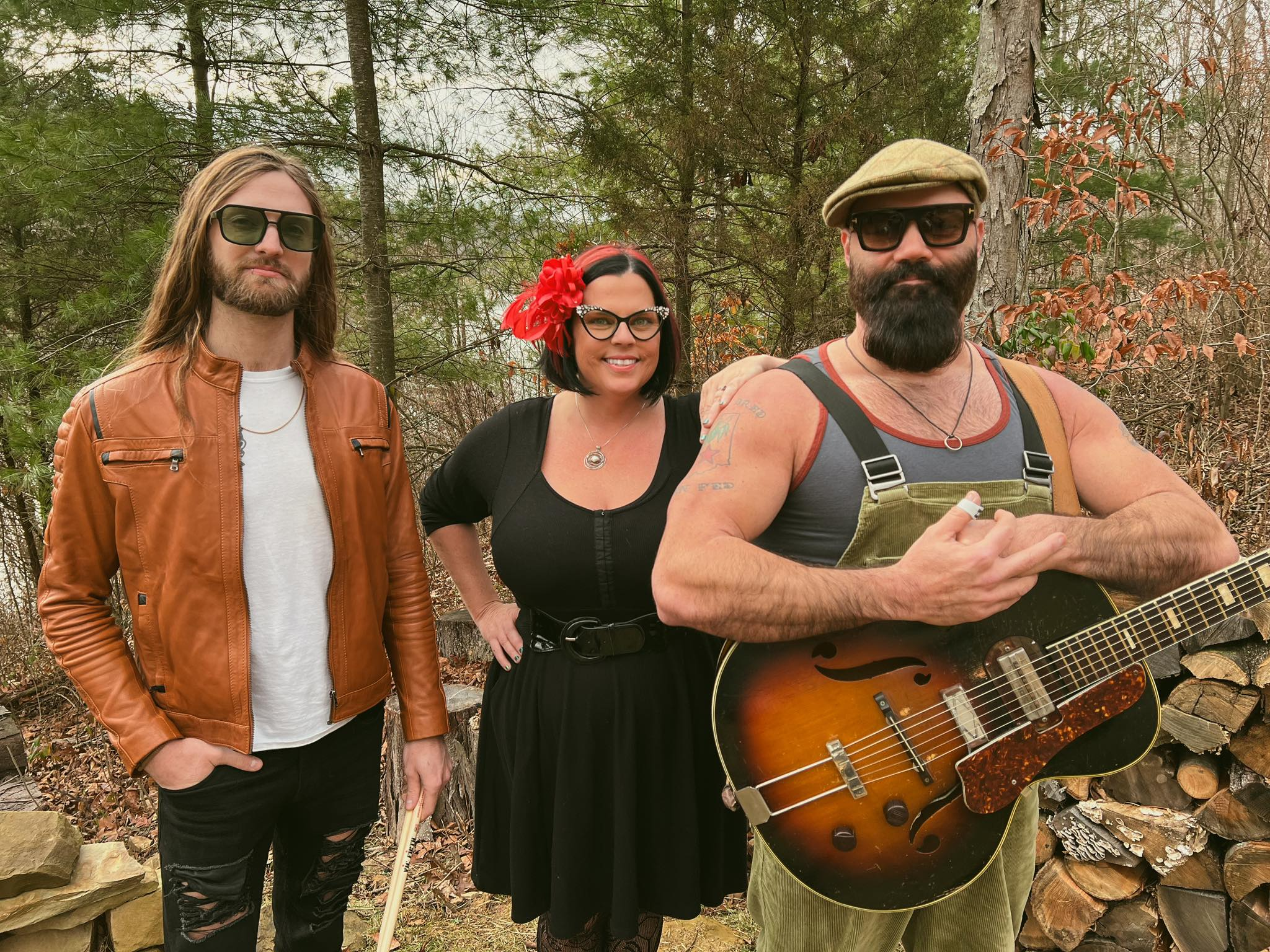
- "Brother Jacob" Powell, and "Washboard" Breezy Peyton and Reverend Peyton

Background information
- Also known as: Big Damn Band
- Origin: Brown County, Indiana, United States
- Genres: Roots music, Country blues
- Members: The Reverend Peyton "Washboard" Breezy Peyton "Brother" Jacob Powell
- Past members: Jayme Peyton; Aaron "Cuz" Persinger; Ben "Bird Dog" Bussell, Max Senteney
- Website: http://www.bigdamnband.com/

The Reverend Peyton's Big Damn Band is a three-piece American country blues band from Brown County, Indiana. They have played up to 250 dates per year at venues ranging from bars to festivals since 2006. To date, they have released ten albums and one EP, most of which have charted on the Billboard and iTunes Charts.

== Members ==
- Reverend Peyton – guitar, lead vocals, and principal songwriter

On stage he plays a rusty 1930 steel-bodied National guitar, a 1934 wood-bodied National Trojan Resonator guitar and a 1994 reproduction of a 1929 Gibson acoustic. He has recently added a three-string cigar box guitar to his stage collection. Peyton uses no outboard gear other than a three input switch box between his guitars and the amplifier. He is a noted proponent of fingerstyle guitar, playing the bass line of songs with his thumb while simultaneously playing the melody, the melody of a different song or a round with his fingers.

- "Washboard" Breezy "The Miss Elizabeth of Country Blues" Peyton – washboard, backing vocals

She plays the washboard using work gloves to which thimbles have been attached. Her aggressive playing style have earned her the reputation as being "arguably the finest percussion player around", and setting fire to her instrument on stage has become a hallmark of the band's reputation for high energy live shows. The washboards used on stage are available for sale at the merchandise table at their concerts.

- Jacob Powell – drums, backing vocals

He plays a small C&C custom drum kit, augmented with a five-gallon plastic bucket fitted with drum hardware. The band claims they are the only rock band with a bucket endorsement deal. Per the band, the addition of Powell's backing vocals has added more harmonic content to the musical mix.

== History ==
The Reverend Peyton was born April 12, 1981, in Eagletown, Indiana. At age 12, Rev Peyton's father gave him a red Kay "State of the Art" model guitar, eventually purchasing a Gorilla amplifier once he learned to play. A friend pointed out the blues sound of Rev Peyton's guitar playing, sending Peyton off on an exploration of the blues of B. B. King, Muddy Waters and B.B. King's cousin Bukka White. Further exploration led to pre-World War II "country blues", and a desire to learn the finger-picking style of artists like Charlie Patton. At the time Peyton was unable to master it, instead playing more pick-oriented blues.

Peyton played a party following his high school graduation, and the next morning suffered excruciating pain in his hands. Doctors told Peyton he'd never be able to hold his left hand in fretting position again. At that point, he gave up on music and spent a year working as the desk clerk in a hotel. During the period when he couldn't physically play guitar, he spent hours imagining playing guitar.

Eventually Peyton sought other medical advice. The Indiana Hand Center operated on his left hand removing a mass of scar tissue which gave him a new flexibility and greater control in his fretting hand that enabled him to play in the "finger" style that had long eluded him. While recovering from surgery, Rev Peyton met Breezy. He played her the music of Charley Patton, and she played him Jimbo Mathus' album Plays Songs For Rosetta, a benefit for his childhood caretaker – Patton's daughter, Rosetta. Their first date was at the Indiana State Fair, where Peyton won a stuffed animal they named the "Big Damn Bear", which gave them a name for their band.

Breezy took up the washboard, and the pair started writing songs. A trip to Clarksdale, Mississippi, inspired them to resume playing music, and their first gigs were at the Melody Inn in Indianapolis, Indiana. The band played blues festivals, headlined two nights at actor Morgan Freeman's Ground Zero Blues Club in Clarksdale, and toured as the opening act for Mary Prankster. Eventually, a 40-hour drive from Indiana to El Centro, California, to open for the Derek Trucks Band and Susan Tedeschi convinced the band to devote themselves to music and touring full-time. They received an offer from a blues record label, but discovered that they had sold more copies of their independently pressed CD "The Pork'n'Beans Collection" at their concerts than the label had managed to sell of any of their other artists. They married on June 14, 2003.

The Big Damn Band has toured constantly in the United States, Canada and Europe, steadily building popularity and sales of their albums.

Rev Peyton is a Kentucky Colonel.

In June 2008, they signed with Los Angeles-based SideOneDummy Records, a label they shared with Flogging Molly. They released The Whole Fam Damily on August 5, 2008, through the label, and it entered the Billboard Blues Chart at #4. They released three additional albums with SideOneDummy – The Wages, Payton on Patton and Between The Ditches.

September 18, 2014, the band announced that they signed with Shanachie Entertainment's recently revived Yazoo Records label, which previously had specialized in reissues. The label announced that "The release of this album marks the first time that a contemporary artist has been released on Yazoo". Their album So Delicious was released on February 17, 2015.

No longer associated with the Yazoo label, the band released The Front Porch Sessions on March 10, 2017, on the Thirty Tigers label, debuting at #1 on the iTunes Blues chart, and #2 on the Billboard Blues chart.

In 2021 the band released Dance Songs for Hard Times that debuted #1 on the Billboard and ITunes Charts. They toured with ZZ Top following the release.

== Touring ==
The Big Damn Band plays more than 250 dates per year, predominantly in the United States, Canada and Europe. The band continues to add more international dates to their touring schedule every year. The majority of their dates are headlining, but they have opened for an eclectic mix of other artists, and have played all the major festivals domestically and internationally including Glastonbury, Bonnaroo, Warped Tour, Telluride and countless others. Their 2007 and 2008 tours included opening dates for the Celtic punk band Flogging Molly, progressive bluegrass band Hot Buttered Rum and the Dirty Dozen Brass Band.

In 2009, they toured opening for Clutch, an extensive headlining tour of Europe and began their relationship with the Van's Warped Tour, playing 12 dates in 2009 on the Kevin Says stage. They were on the entire 2010 Van's Warped Tour on the Alternative Press stage and their song Clap Your Hands is on disc one of the 2010 Warped Tour compilation CD. They received the Best Band of Warped Tour award, voted by the crew, bands, and promoters.

The band has played other festivals such as Rooster Walk, Austin City Limits, Telluride, and the Bonnaroo Festival on June 9, 2011. They have also played blues festivals and venues in Italy, Switzerland and Austria, and spent the fall of 2011 touring Europe.

The band played the 2011 Sturgis Motorcycle Rally for five consecutive evenings, August 7 through August 11 at the Full Throttle Saloon, the "World's Largest Biker Bar" that is only open ten days per year.

On March 6, 2013, they launched the Big Damn Blues Revolution Tour with Jimbo Mathus & Grammy Winner Alvin Youngblood Hart in Columbia, Missouri.

During 2020 and 2021, due to tour date cancellations as a side effect of the COVID-19 pandemic, the band started doing monthly live streams from their home, typically playing an hour of music and encouraging donations or patreon subscriptions during the set.

== Media appearances ==
The Reverend Peyton's Big Damn Band has been featured on Sirius Satellite Radio, has played multiple showcases at the South by Southwest music conference, and has been the musical guest on Michael Feldman's Whad'Ya Know?. Their music is featured in the award-winning film Mississippi Cold Case by Canadian documentarian David Ridgen. Their song "Your Cousin's On Cops" led to a gig as the house band on a Jerry Springer Pay-Per-View special. In 2008 the band was featured in the Bikes, Blues and Barbecue motorcycle festival in Fayetteville, Arkansas.

The band was featured in a cover story of the April/May 2009 issue of Blues Review magazine, and has appeared in a feature on CNN.

On January 10, 2013, The Indianapolis Star newspaper reported that the band had licensed four songs to the US cable television network Showtime series Shameless. The first song was used in the soundtrack of the 8th episode of the 3rd series, which premiered on March 10, 2013. Their song Something For Nothing appears on the series soundtrack album, released April 15, 2014.

A video featuring Rev Peyton playing a three-string guitar fashioned out of a 12 gauge shotgun by fellow Indiana native Bryan Fleming went viral, garnering tens of millions of views and mentions on cable TV programs. It was described by the satirical web site The Onion in their "Great Job, Internet!" feature as "the most American thing ever made". Peyton plays the instrument, releases the safety, aims at a target of a jug full of water, fires, then finishes the song with a laugh.

In October 2016, the band started their Hard Times and Weirdness podcast, detailing their adventures on the road. In October 2016, the band's Hard Times and Weirdness podcast was on the Big O and Dukes network.

The Big O and Dukes Show podcast opening theme song is "Clap Your Hands." On April 25, 2017, Reverend Peyton's Big Damn Band performed the song live on the Big O and Dukes bunker studios.

In 2019, their album Poor Until Payday was nominated for a Blues Music Award as the Best Blues Rock Album. Rev Peyton assembled and led the All-Star jam finale at the awards show. Also in 2019, Rev was featured on the cover of Vintage Guitar.

In 2020, the Big Damn Band launched their Patreon, with an exclusive podcast exploring the "nuts and bolts" of many of their most popular songs.

== Discography ==
=== The Pork'n'Beans Collection ===
This first album is all original material, except for Charlie Patton's "Pony Blues". Album was a basement demo of the earliest recordings of the band before they had toured and is currently out of print.

1. "My Soul to Keep"
2. "Plainfield Blues"
3. "Sure Feels Like Rain"
4. "Never Seem to Mind"
5. "Pork Chop Biscuit"
6. "Ain't Got Nothin'"
7. "Pony Blues"
8. "Wejusgetinba"
9. "One Bad Shoe"
10. "Rich Man"
11. "That Train Song"

=== Voodoo Cock EP ===
Sampler of songs from the album to appear the next year as well as re-recorded versions of songs from the previous album, this more accurately reflected the evolving style of the band and The Rev's lower, rougher voice. Packaged in a simple cardboard slipcase and sold at a lower price, was only available in concert.

1. "Aberdeen"
2. "My Old Man Boogie"
3. "Plainfield Blues"
4. "My Soul to Keep"
5. "Pork Chop Biscuit"

=== Big Damn Nation ===
Produced by Paul Mahern and Jimbo Mathus of the Squirrel Nut Zippers, Recorded direct to analog tape with no overdubs, this album most accurately captures the sound of the band in concert. All original material except for the cover of Bukka White's "Aberdeen Mississippi Blues", it includes re-recorded versions of several songs from the first album. The Reverend's voice is lower and more road worn. Jayme Peyton's drum kit has simplified to a single 18" kick, cymbal and an 8" snare, placing the drums in a much higher register than average.

1. "My Old Man Boogie"
2. "Long Gone"
3. "Spreadin' Your Love Around"
4. "Boom Chank"
5. "Worryin' Kind"
6. "Left Hand George"
7. "Mud"
8. "Another Bottle"
9. "Aberdeen"
10. "Plainfield Blues"
11. "My Soul to Keep"
12. "Sugar Man"

=== The Gospel Album ===
Produced by Paul Mahern at White Ark Studios, The Gospel Album has similar production and style to that of Big Damn Nation. The album features Big Damn Band versions of seven gospel classics and one original song, "Blow That Horn", written by The Rev. Peyton. In terms of instrumentation changes, Jayme Peyton brings the five gallon bucket to the fore-front, which can be heard prominently on the song "Tell All the World John". Packaged in a limited edition tin, The Gospel Album officially went on-sale September 12, 2007.

1. "Blow That Horn"
2. "Down by the Riverside"
3. "Glory Glory Hallelujah"
4. "Tell All the World John"
5. "I Shall Not Be Moved"
6. "Rock Island Line"
7. "Let Your Light Shine"
8. "Amazing Grace"

=== The Whole Fam Damnily ===
Recorded in a church in Bloomington, Indiana. Went on sale August 4, 2008. Entered Billboard's "Blues" chart at #4 Blues guitarist Kenny Wayne Shepherd was introduced to the album by John Mellencamp and listed it as one of his top five "not-so-guilty pleasures", saying "His playing is great, but the vocal is where it gets unique" and "He sounds like a lumberjack singing. Try to picture some dude in a flannel shirt, walking through the backwoods with an axe and singing to himself."

1. "Can't Pay the Bill"
2. "Mama's Fried Potatoes"
3. "Worn Out Shoe"
4. "DT's or the Devil"
5. "Your Cousin's on Cops"
6. "John Hughes (The Water Tower's Heart Is Sore)"
7. "The Creek's Are All Bad"
8. "Them Old Days Are Gone"
9. "Walmart Killed the Country Store"
10. "I'd Love You Baby"
11. "Everybody's Getting Paid but Me"
12. "What's Mine Is Yours"
13. "Persimmon Song"

Whole Fam Damnily Chart History

#4 on the Billboard Blues Album Chart

=== The Wages ===
The first album with new drummer Aaron "Cuz" Persinger was released on May 25, 2010, and entered the Billboard Blues Album chart at number two.

The on-line music service Rhapsody praised the album, calling it one of 2010's most overlooked releases. Claiming that it disappeared beneath "the release-date-obsessed radar," they deemed it one of the best albums released in the first half of the year.

1. "Born Bred Corn Fed"
2. "Redbuds"
3. "Clap Your Hands"
4. "Sure Feels Like Rain"
5. "Everything's Raising"
6. "What Go Around Come Around"
7. "Sugar Creek"
8. "In a Holler Over There"
9. "That Train Song"
10. "Lick Creek Road"
11. "Ft. Wayne Zoo"
12. "Just Getting By"
13. "Two Bottles of Wine"
14. "Miss Sarah"

The Wages Chart History

#2 on the Billboard Blues Album Chart 2010

#37 on the Billboard Heatseekers Chart

=== Peyton on Patton ===
On July 19, 2011, the band released Peyton on Patton, an album exclusively of Charlie Patton songs. The album was recorded by Paul Mahern with a single microphone in four hours in a single day to duplicate the methods used to create the original Patton recordings. While the recording is primarily the Reverend Peyton's guitar and vocals, Breezy Peyton contributes washboard to several songs and a vocal to Elder Green Blues, and Aaron Persinger drums on an antique tobacco barrel.

The album features three different versions of Some of These Days I'll Be Gone, one of Rev Peyton's favorite songs. The original concept was to record an album exclusively of different versions of this song.

The album's first song, Jesus Is a Dying-bed Maker was recorded inside the cotton gin at the Dockery Plantation, Patton's childhood home.

Peyton on Patton is available via digital download and CD, and also a 12" LP vinyl and a 10" 78 RPM version that includes digital download rights.

In the first week of release, the album entered the Billboard Blues Album chart at #7.

1. "Jesus Is a Dying-Bed Maker"
2. "Some of These Days I'll Be Gone" (Charley Patton Version)
3. "Mississippi Boweavil Blues"
4. "Elder Greene Blues"
5. "Tom Rushen Blues"
6. "Some Happy Days"
7. "Some of These Days I'll Be Gone" (Banjo Version)
8. "Green River Blues"
9. "Prayer of Death Pt. 1"
10. "A Spoonful Blues"
11. "You're Gonna Need Someone (When You Come to Die)"
12. "Shake It and Break It"
13. "Some of These Days I'll Be Gone" (Rev. Peyton Version)

Peyton on Patton Chart History

#7 on the Billboard Blues Album Chart

=== Between the Ditches ===
On August 7, 2012, the band released Between the Ditches on CD, LP and digital download. The packaging for the physical releases includes postcards for each of the tracks by photographer Scott Toepfer, with the lyrics for each song printed on the back of the card. On the first day of sales, the album was at the top of the iTunes Blues chart and debuted at the number 2 spot on the Billboard Blues chart, reaching number 130 on the Billboard Pop Album chart, making it the band's biggest commercial success to date.

Unlike the previous album Peyton on Patton, Between the Ditches was recorded as a traditional studio album, using separate tracks over a longer period of time.

British newspaper The Independent gave the album four stars out of five, describing it as "a peculiarly infectious blues crusade, touching on themes of money, morality and social responsibility." Barry Kerzner of American Blues Scene described the album as an "amazingly well crafted, controlled explosion of talent" and that one should "Imagine the playing of Vince Gill, Whitey Johnson, James Blood Ulmer, and Ricky Skaggs all rolled into one person."

The video for the lead single off the album Devils Look Like Angels was released on August 9, 2012. Directed by Kevin Custer, who has also directed videos for The Gaslight Anthem, Hatebreed and Lil Wayne as well as a live concert DVD for label-mates Flogging Molly. It features Elsie McNulty, an eight year old fan of the band, lip syncing the lead vocals. Peyton explained that "I thought it would be funny to have a little girl with my voice. Plus, it shows that sometimes mean things can come in pretty packages. You just never can tell."

The band released an animated music video for the song Big Blue Chevy '72 on February 14, 2013. It was produced by Terry Border of Bent Objects and features animated still images of the band's signature instruments as well as the eponymous truck.

Four of the songs from the album were used in the Showtime television series Shameless, and Something for Nothing appeared on the soundtrack album.

1. "Devils Look Like Angels"
2. "Something for Nothing"
3. "We'll Get Through"
4. "Big Blue Chevy '72"
5. "Shut the Screen"
6. "Shake 'em Off Like Fleas"
7. "Easy Come Easy Go"
8. "I Don't Know"
9. "Don't Grind It Down"
10. "The Money Goes"
11. "Move Along Mister"
12. "Between the Ditches"
13. "Brokedown Everywhere"
14. "Brown County Bound"

Between the Ditches Chart History

#1 on the iTunes Blues Chart

#2 on the Billboard Blues Album Chart

#169 on the Billboard Top 200 Records Chart

#9 on the Billboard Tastemaker Albums Chart

#49 on Billboard' Top Rock Albums

#2 on the Billboard Heatseekers Chart

#22 on Billboard's Independent Albums Chart

=== So Delicious ===
On January 17, 2015, the band released So Delicious on Yazoo Records, becoming the first contemporary band on the revived label, distributed by Shanachie. January 26, 2015, they released "Raise A Little Hell" as the first music video for the album, featuring a parade of eccentric characters through a small town.

1. "Let's Jump a Train"
2. "Pot Roast and Kisses"
3. "Dirt"
4. "Raise a Little Hell"
5. "Scream at the Night"
6. "Hell Naw"
7. "Front Porch Trained"
8. "Pickin Pawpaws"
9. "We Live Dangerous"
10. "You're Not Rich"
11. "Music and Friends"

So Delicious Chart History

#1 on the iTunes Blues Chart

#3 on the Billboard Blues Album Chart

#3 on the Billboard Heatseekers Chart

#5 on the Billboard Tastemaker Albums Chart

#22 on Billboard's Independent Albums Chart

#31 on Billboard' Top Rock Albums

AIMS top selling debut on street date

AIMS top seller release week

=== The Front Porch Sessions ===
This self-produced album was released on March 10, 2017, marking a return to their private Family Owned Records label, distributed by Thirty Tigers and consists of original songs as well as covers of the Furry Lewis song "When My Baby Left Me", a traditional gospel song first recorded by The Wiseman Quartet "Let Your Light Shine On Me" and Don Whiston's "Cornbread and Butterbeans". Featuring quieter instrumentation than the previous recording, with drummer Max Senteney occasionally playing a suitcase instead of a traditional drum kit, attempting to capture the sound of the band playing on the front porch of their home.

1. "We Deserve a Happy Ending"
2. "When My Baby Left Me"
3. "Shakey Shirley"
4. "What You Did to the Boy Ain't Right"
5. "One Bad Shoe"
6. "It's All Night"
7. "One More Thing"
8. "Flying Squirrels"
9. "Let Your Light Shine"
10. "When You Lose Your Money"
11. "Cornbread and Butterbeans"

Front Porch Sessions Chart History

#1 on the iTunes Blues Chart

#2 on the Billboard Blues Album Chart

#11 on the Billboard Heatseekers Chart

#30 on Billboard's Independent Albums Chart

=== Poor Until Payday ===
The ninth full-length album from the group, Poor Until Payday was released via the band's own Family Owned Records label through Nashville indie Thirty Tigers on October 5, 2018.

1. "You Can't Steal My Shine"
2. "Dirty Swerve"
3. "Poor Until Payday"
4. "So Good"
5. "Church Clothes"
6. "Get the Family Together"
7. "Me and the Devil"
8. "Frenchmen Street"
9. "It Is or It Ain't"

Poor Until Payday Chart History

#1 on the iTunes Blues Chart

#4 on the Billboard Blues Album Chart

#99 on the Billboard Top 200 Album Chart

=== Dance Songs for Hard Times ===
The band's tenth album, Dance Songs for Hard Times, was released on April 9, 2021, on the Family Owned label and distributed through Thirty Tigers. It reached No. 1 on Billboard magazine's Blues Albums chart for the week of April 24, 2021.

1. "Ways and Means"
2. "Rattle Can"
3. "Dirty Hustlin'"
4. "I'll Pick You Up"
5. "Too Cool to Dance"
6. "No Tellin' When"
7. "Sad Songs"
8. "Crime to Be Poor"
9. "'Til We Die"
10. "Nothing's Easy but You and Me"
11. "Come Down Angels"

=== Honeysuckle ===
The band's eleventh album Honeysuckle was released on February 21, 2025. This is the first album with Jacob Powell, playing chains and other "weird percussion". Produced and recorded by: Reverend Peyton. Mixed by: Six-time Grammy winner Vance Powell (Jack White, Chris Stapleton). Special guests include: Gospel music trio The McCrary Sisters who sing on "Looking for A Manger". Blues Music Hall of Famer and Grammy-nominated harmonica player Billy Branch plays on "Nell (Prison Cell Blues)", Grammy Award-winning fiddle player Michael Cleveland plays on "Freeborn Man" and Colton Crawford from The Dead South plays on "The Good Die Young".

1. "Honeysuckle"
2. "If I Had Possession Over Judgement Day"
3. "Looking for a Manger"
4. "Like a Treasure"
5. "One Dime Blues L Nell (Prison Cell Blues)"
6. "Freeborn Man"
7. "I Can't Sleep"
8. "Let Me Go"
9. "The Good Die Young"
10. "Keep Your Lamp Trimmed and Burning"
11. "Mama Do"
