= Swearing at Motorists =

Rock band

Swearing At Motorists
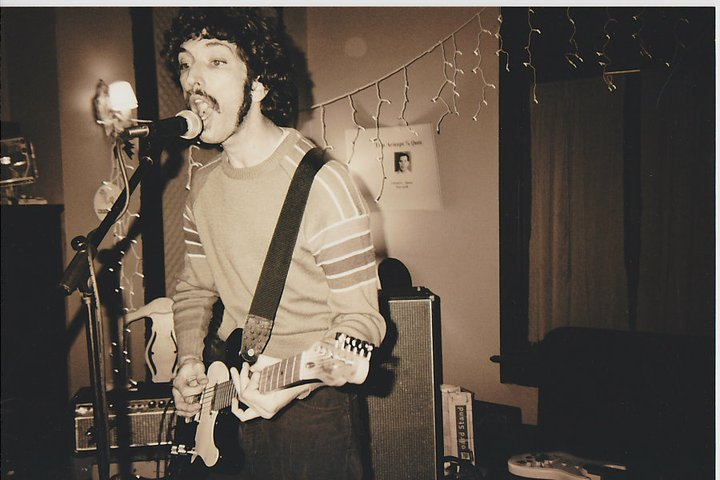
- Swearing At Motorists live in the early 2000s in Indianapolis, Indiana.

Background information
- Origin: Dayton, Ohio, United States
- Genres: Indie rock
- Years active: 1995–present
- Labels: Secretly Canadian
- Members: Dave Doughman - vocals, guitars, etc Martin Boeters - drums
- Past members: Don Thrasher - drums, tapes Joseph Siwinski - drums Timmy Taylor - drums Mike Volk - guitar Neil Blender - bass Kelley Marchal - percussion Matt Bowman - guitar W. Wright - sitar Phil Mehaffey - organ Tom Byrne - 12 string guitar, mandolin, lap steel Kelli Byrne - vocals Rodd Boggs - dulcimer, guitar, trumpet Steve Poulton - organ Warren Byrom - trumpet Nate Farley - farfisa Jim Greer - guitar Nick Chiccehitto - mandolin Brian Mctear - rhodes, banjo Noel Siwinski - guitar Todd Siwinski - percussion Kurt Wunder - trumpet Travis Nelsen - drums Jonathan Cargill - drums Michael Kapinus - trumpet Jim Zespy - organ, keyboards Joe Dilworth - drums Harrison Hayes - drums Mike Kennedy - drums Richard Coneliano - drums Ben Chamie - drums Jason Kourkounis - drums Dimitri Coats - drums Scout Niblett - drums Craig Nichols - drums Will Johnson - drums Matt "Pistol" Stoessel - pedal steel Henry Owings - vocals TC Marsh - drums Martin Boeters - drums Ludwig Jackson Doughman - vocals, drums Mike Postalakis - Deadpan Hype Man

Swearing At Motorists is a two-piece rock and roll band composed of Dave Doughman (guitar, vocals, etc.) and drummer Martin Boeters (previously Joseph Siwinski). They formed in Dayton, Ohio in 1994, releasing their self-titled debut cassette in 1995. Joseph Siwinski replaced Don Thrasher (formerly of Guided by Voices), who had originally been on drums.

Swearing At Motorists is also known as "The Two Man Who", a nickname bestowed upon the band by Cheetah Chrome of the Dead Boys. Their albums are a combination of rock and love songs "that portray a character at the mercy of his own destiny."

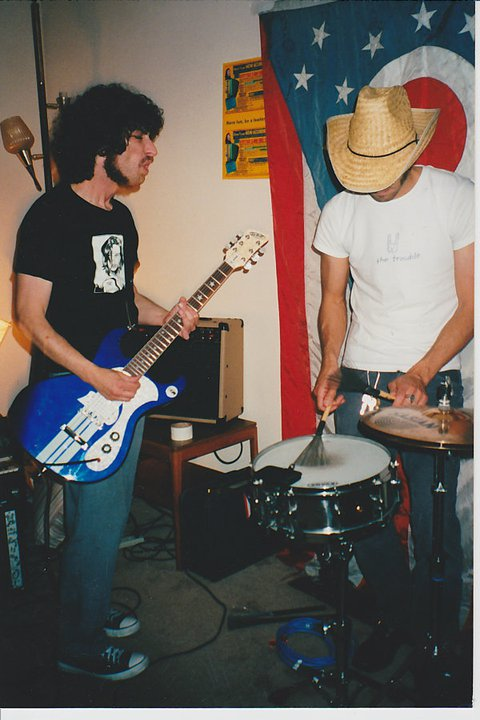
Swearing At Motorists live in Indianapolis, Indiana in the early 2000s.

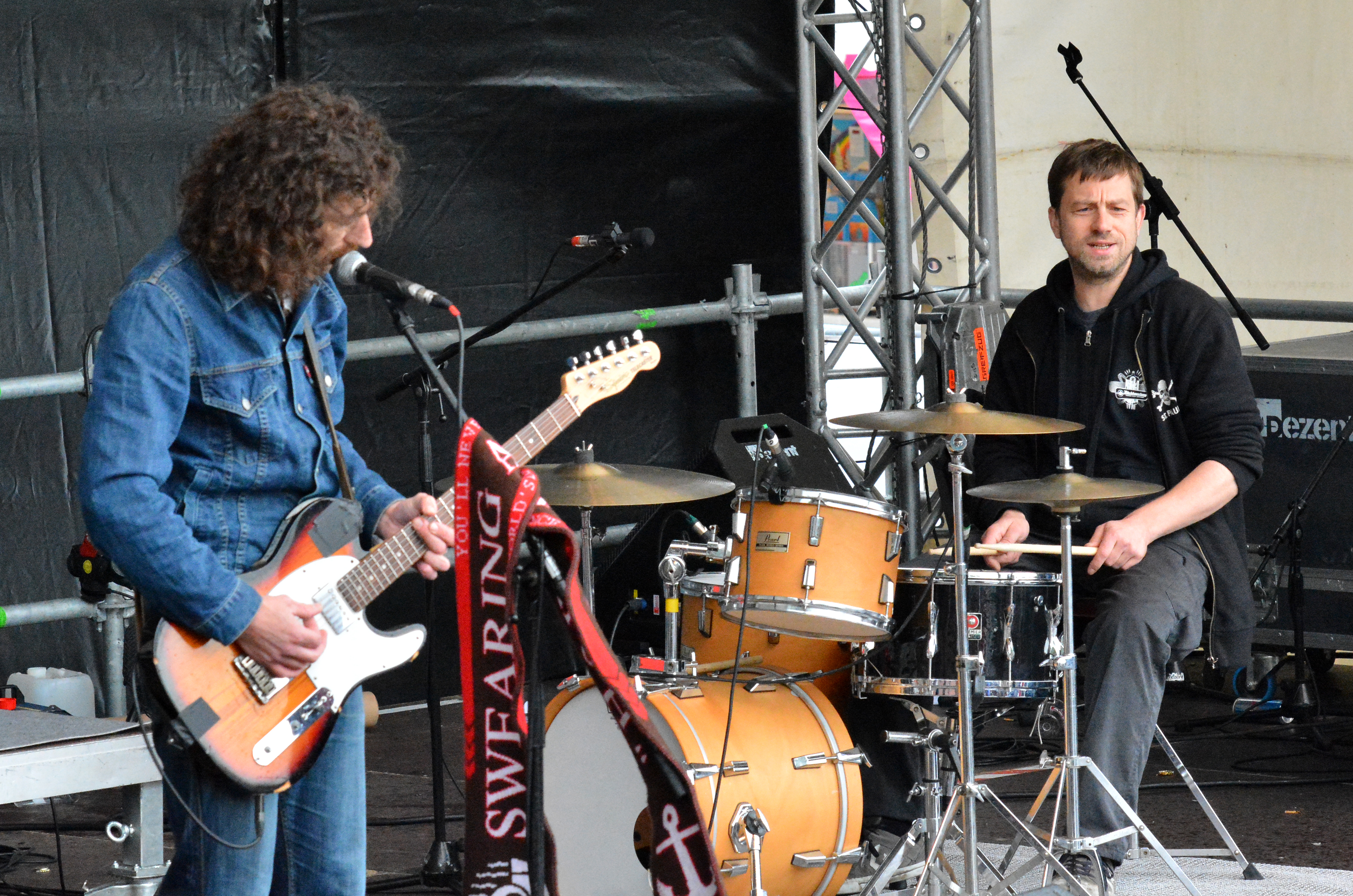
Swearing At Motorists live in Hamburg, Germany 2014.

The Swearing At Motorists song "Flying Pizza", named after a Dayton pizzeria, details an unpleasant encounter with an old acquaintance.

Swearing At Motorists' concerts have involved antics such as Doughman tearing the strings out of his guitar mid-song and jumping offstage, as well as comedic anecdotes relayed between, and sometimes within, songs.

The band has toured the United States and Europe several times. From 2000 - 2011 all of their records were released by Bloomington, Indiana label Secretly Canadian. In 2014 Austrian label Siluh Records released their 7" ep Burn Down The Wire. On February 8, 2014, the band successfully funded the production & manufacturing of their newest album, While Laughing, The Joker Tells The Truth, via Kickstarter.

Frontman Dave Doughman has challenged The White Stripes to a contest of who can put on a better show, but has never received a reply.

== Discography ==
- Swearing At Motorists (CD) - 1995
- Tuesday's Pretzel Night (EP) - 1996
- The Fear of Low-Flying Clouds (LP) - 1997
- Enough Drama and The Way Things Are (EP) - 1997
- More Songs From the Mellow Struggle (CD) - 2000
- Stumble to the Zero Hour (EP) - 2000
- Number Seven Uptown (LP) - 2000
- The Burnt Orange Heresy (EP) - 2000
- Along the Inclined Plane (EP) - 2002
- This Flag Signals Goodbye (LP) - 2002
- Last Night Becomes This Morning (LP) - 2006
- Exile on Gipsstraße (LP) - 2006
- Postcards From A Drinking Town (collected singles '96-'02) (LP) - 2011
- Burn Down The Wire (EP) - 2014
- While Laughing, The Joker Tells The Truth (LP) - 2014
