= Odawas (band) =

American rock band

Odawas is a psychedelic/ambient rock band that formed in Bloomington, Indiana, in late 2003.

== History ==
Their first EP, Vitamin City, was self-released in 2004. In 2005, Jagjaguwar Records released The Aether Eater, the band's first full-length album. While recording a follow-up record, singer and songwriter Michael Tapscott produced a home-recorded solo record under the moniker, More Animals of the Arctic. An Appendix of Whaling Terms was released in 2006 by Standard Recording Company. 2007 saw the release of Raven and the White Night on Jagjaguwar. The album found the band crafting material that blended the songwriting of Tapscott's solo work and the ambient textures developed on Odawas' Jagjaguwar debut.

In 2008 Tapscott and Edwards relocated to Chicago, IL and began recording their next album The Blue Depths, which was released in 2009. They are now in the San Francisco area where they have been playing with longtime friend and fellow Indiana musician Connor O'Sullivan [Grahame Lesh & Friends, Dem Suite, & Otto Mobile and the Moaners.)

== Discography ==
- 2004 - Vitamin City CD-R (self-released)
- 2005 - The Aether Eater CD/LP (Jagjaguwar)
- 2006 - An Appendix of Whaling Terms CD (as More Animals of the Arctic) (Standard Recording Company)
- 2007 - Raven and the White Night CD/LP (Jagjaguwar)
- 2009 - The Blue Depths CD/LP (Jagjaguwar)
- 2014 - Reflections of a Pink Laser LP (Bookmaker Records)
- 2015 - Black Harmony Limited Cassette (Bookmaker Records)
