= I Love You but I've Chosen Darkness =

Post-punk revival band from Austin, Texas

I Love You But I've Chosen Darkness
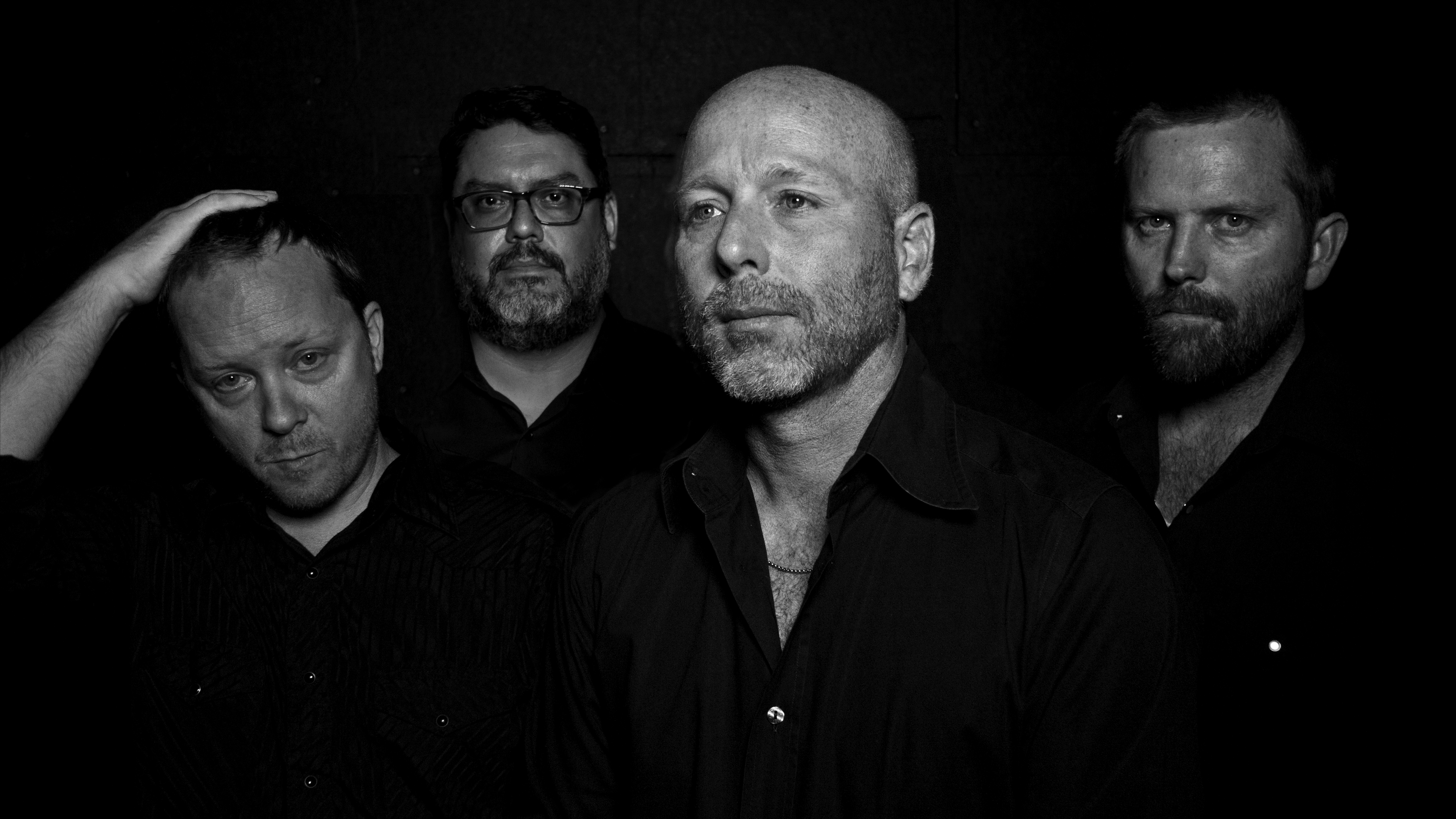

Background information
- Origin: Austin, Texas, U.S.
- Genres: Indie rock, post-punk revival
- Years active: 2003–present
- Labels: Emperor Jones, Artikal, Secretly Canadian, Monopsone
- Past members: Christian Goyer; Edward Robert; Ernest Salaz; Tim White; Daniel Del Favero; Brian Tomlin; Jason McNeely

I Love You But I've Chosen Darkness was a post-punk revival band from Austin, Texas.

== History ==
The band's eponymous debut five-song EP, released by Emperor Jones on November 18, 2003, was produced by Spoon frontman Britt Daniel.

In 2006, the band released their first studio album, Fear Is on Our Side (Secretly Canadian), which was produced by former Ministry bassist/keyboardist Paul Barker.

After a sabbatical of eight years, ILYBICD announced on August 12, 2014, that their second album, Dust (also produced by Barker) would be released by Secretly Canadian on October 28, 2014, and previewed the track "Faust".

== Discography ==
=== Studio albums ===
- Fear Is on Our Side (2006), Secretly Canadian
- Dust (2014), Secretly Canadian/Monopsone

=== Singles and EPs ===
- I Love You But I've Chosen Darkness CD/12" (2003), Emperor Jones
- "According to Plan" 12" (2005), Artikal
- "You Are Dead to Me" (2014), Secretly Canadian/Monopsone
