= Catfish Haven =

American indie rock band

- Origin: Chicago, Illinois, United States
- Genres: Indie rock, soul
- Years active: 2004-present
- Label: Secretly Canadian
- Members: George Hunter; Miguel Castillo; Ryan Farnham
- Website: www.catfishhaven.com

Catfish Haven is an indie rock band from Chicago, currently signed to Secretly Canadian Records.

Their music was described by The A.V. Club writer Kyle Ryan in 2006 as "Creedence Clearwater Revival meets Nirvana". Ryan goes on in the same article to explain that "Because [Catfish Haven] grew up playing punk, they mostly avoid acoustic-rock conventions by channeling punk’s aggression and intensity. Few similar bands match the racket Catfish Haven makes, but few bands mix elements of folk, country, rock, and punk so well." They released their debut EP, Please Come Back, in 2006. Insound described it as "akin to guitarists/vocalists like Bruce Springsteen and John Fogerty". It was followed by their debut album, Tell Me.

== Discography ==
- Please Come Back (Secretly Canadian, 2006)
- Tell Me (Secretly Canadian, 2006)
- Devastator (Secretly Canadian, 2008)
