= Bobb Trimble =

American musician (born 1958)

- Born: August 4, 1958 (age 67)
- Origin: Worcester, Massachusetts
- Genres: Psychedelic folk, psychedelic rock
- Years active: 1980–present
- Labels: Secretly Canadian; Orpheus; Vengeance; Bobb Records

Bobb Trimble (born August 4, 1958) is a psychedelic folk/outsider musician from Worcester, Massachusetts.

== Biography ==
He released two full-length albums, Iron Curtain Innocence in 1980 and Harvest of Dreams in 1982. Following the latter's release, Trimble's recording activities ceased.

Over the next two decades, he gained a cult following, which included Ariel Pink and Sonic Youth's Thurston Moore. His records, originally pressed in quantities of 500 or less, became collector's items, some selling for as much as $1,500.

During the early 1980s, he had two backing bands: The Kidds (the average age of the band members was 12 years old) and The Crippled Dog Band (average age was 15 years). "Suspicious parents" pulled the plug on both bands.

=== Reissues ===
2002 saw the release of Life Beyond the Doghouse, a vinyl-only compilation on Orpheus Records comprising unreleased recordings made by Trimble between 1983 and 1986.

Iron Curtain Innocence and Harvest of Dreams were re-released in 2007 by the Secretly Canadian label, each with a handful of bonus tracks.
