= Luxury (Iowa band) =

American power pop rock band

Luxury was a power pop rock music band from Des Moines, Iowa that played together from 1977 – 1982. It released two 7" singles and one EP.

Luxury's single "Green Hearts" has appeared on the Declaration of Independents compilation as well as the Yellow Pills: Prefill and the Buttons: Starter Kit compilations. It was also used in the soundtrack of the movie Summerhood a.k.a. Age of Summerhood directed by Jacob Medjuck.

Luxury's single "One In A Million" also appeared on the Yellow Pills: Prefill and the Buttons: Starter Kit compilations. The single "Countdown" also appeared on the Buttons: Starter Kit compilation.

== Band members ==
- Rick Swan – vocals, guitar
- Kerry Swan – lead vocals, guitar, keyboards
- Jeff Shotwell – guitar
- Bryn Ohme – bass
- Doug Taylor – drums, percussion
- Jim Willits – drums (1979)
- Don Papian – drums (1978)

== Discography ==
- Stupidest Thing / What Kind of Question's That? (Angry Young Records 1978) [7" only]
- Green Hearts / One in a Million (Angry Young Records 1979) [AYR 2479] [7" only]
- EP #1 (Angry Young Records 1981) [12" only]
