= Don Lennon =

American musician

Don Lennon is an independent musician from Massachusetts.

== Early life ==
Little personal information is known about Lennon. Several interviewers have implied that his name is a pseudonym. His style is often compared to that of Beat Happening, The Magnetic Fields and most notably fellow New Englander Jonathan Richman.

== Career ==
Lennon was the guitarist and singer of the Boston-based band The Umpteens (sometimes, incorrectly, "The Endless Upteens" ). Shortly after the group's breakup in 1997, Lennon recorded his first solo album, Maniac. Many of the songs were originally played by The Umpteens. His website states that some of these songs were written as early as 1993. Two recurring themes throughout the album are parties ("Party Coordinator," "Party In September" and "Party All The Time") and friends ("Best Friends Forever" and "I Need Friends").

Don Lennon, a quasi-autobiographical album, came in 1999. Much of the album's lyrical content spoke about the musician's trials and tribulations in previous years while playing concerts promoting Maniac.

Downtown was released in 2002 on the independent label Secretly Canadian. The record dealt with the music industry, name checking Dave Matthews Band, Lenny Kravitz, The Mekons, Bongwater and John Cale (of The Velvet Underground). Bizarrely, Secretly Canadian soon after began distancing itself from Lennon and the album, eventually removing it as a release from its catalog (although it was originally SC #62).

2005 saw the release of Lennon's fourth full-length album, Routine. The subject matter dealt primarily with stand-up comedy and the construction of a comedian's routine, but also focused on Monster.com, John Ritter and trust funds. NPR's John Brady cited the album as one of the three best records of 2005, while Sweden's prominent Digfi magazine rated it the number one.

== Discography ==
- Maniac (Martin Philip, 1997)
- Don Lennon (Martin Philip, 1999)
- Downtown (Secretly Canadian/Martin Philip, 2002)
- Routine (Martin Philip, 2005)
- Ich Heisse Don (Popfrenzy, 2005)
- Radical (Martin Philip, 2006)
- Nick and Mary (2010)
