= The Horns of Happiness =

American rock band

- Origin: Bloomington, Indiana, US
- Genres: Experimental; Psychedelic
- Years active: 2004–present
- Labels: Secretly Canadian; St. Ives; PIAPTK
- Members: Aaron Deer; Shelley Harrison; Andrew Kenower
- Past members: Elaina Morgan; Peter King; Joe Molinero; Mark Rice
- Website: Official site

The Horns of Happiness are an independent rock band formerly of Bloomington, Indiana now residents of Oakland/Los Angeles, CA. Since forming in 2004, the band has released one full-length album, one soundtrack, and two EPs on Secretly Canadian while touring extensively through the US, sharing the stage with acts such as Man Man, Silver Jews, Old Time Relijun, Danielson Famile, Joanna Newsom, and The Dirty Projectors, among others, while garnering acclaim in publications such as Magnet, Dusted and Skyscraper magazines.

== Discography ==
- A Sea As A Shore - Album - (Secretly Canadian, 2004)
- Would I Find Your Psychic Guideline - 12" - (Secretly Canadian, 2006)
- What Spills Like Thread - 12" - (Secretly Canadian, 2007)
- Weathering Alterations - 12" - (St. Ives, 2009)
- The Horns of Happiness EP - Digital Download - (Secretly Canadian, 2010)
