= Brat (band) =

Australian band

- Genres: rock
- Years active: 2002 - 2004
- Label: Mushroom
- Members: Natalie Miller; Cameron McGlinchey; Alex Lange; Matt Cornell

Brat is an Australian band fronted by Natalie Miller from Young Talent Time. The band formed in 2002 with Miller (vocals), Cameron McGlinchey (drums), Alex Lange (guitar) and Matt Cornell (bass). They released "He Said She Said" in July 2003. The song, written by Miller, Simon Austin (Frente) and Barry Palmer, debuted at number 77 on the ARIA Single chart. In February 2004 they had a listening party for their debut album but the album was not released.

== Discography ==
- "He Said She Said" (2003) - MGM Aus #77
