= Stella Donnelly =

Australian indie rock singer and guitarist (born 1992)

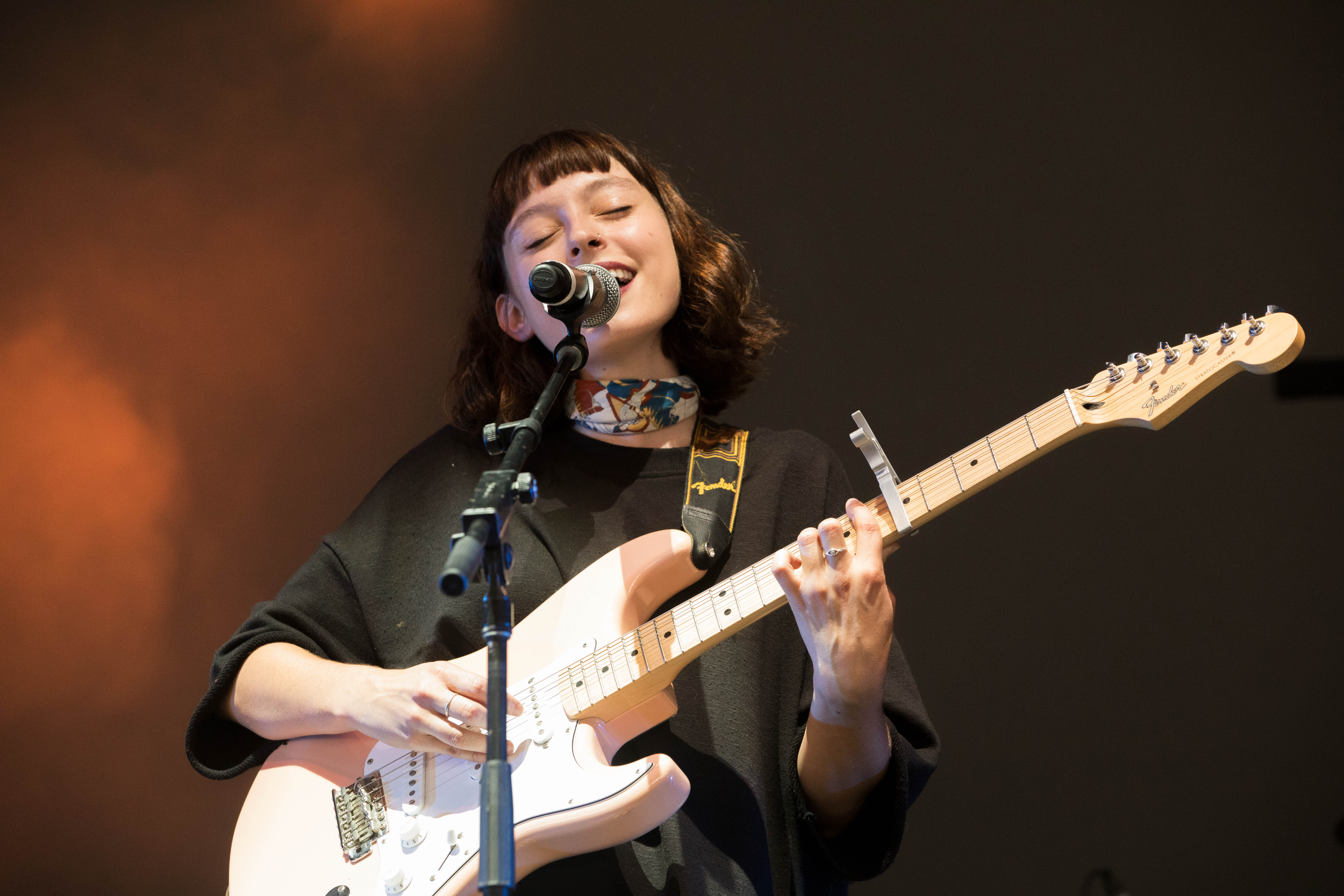
- Donnelly performing in 2018

Background information
- Born: Stella Donnelly; 10 April 1992 (age 34); Western Australia, Australia
- Genres: Indie pop; indie rock; indie folk
- Occupations: Singer-songwriter; musician
- Instruments: Vocals; guitar; bass; keyboards
- Years active: 2016–present
- Labels: Secretly Canadian; Healthy Tapes
- Formerly of: Bell Rapids, Boat Show
- Website: stelladonnelly.com

Stella Donnelly (born 10 April 1992) is a Welsh-Australian indie rock singer-songwriter and guitarist. After the success of her debut EP Thrush Metal in 2017, she signed with Secretly Canadian in 2018. She released her debut studio album Beware of the Dogs to critical acclaim in March 2019, peaking at number 15 on the ARIA Album Charts, and winning Independent Album of the Year at the AIR Awards. Her second studio album, Flood, was released in August 2022, debuting at number 29 on the ARIA Charts. Her third, Love and Fortune, was issued in November 2025.

== Early life ==
Born in Western Australia to a Welsh mother, she spent some childhood years in Morriston, Wales before moving to Perth, Western Australia with her family.

Donnelly first started singing when she joined a rock band in high school (Irene McCormack Catholic College) that performed Green Day covers. After high school, Donnelly studied contemporary and jazz music at the Western Australian Academy of Performing Arts (WAAPA). Donnelly was a part of the bands Boat Show and Bell Rapids before leaving them to pursue her solo career.

== Career ==
=== 2017–2021: Thrush Metal and Beware of the Dogs ===
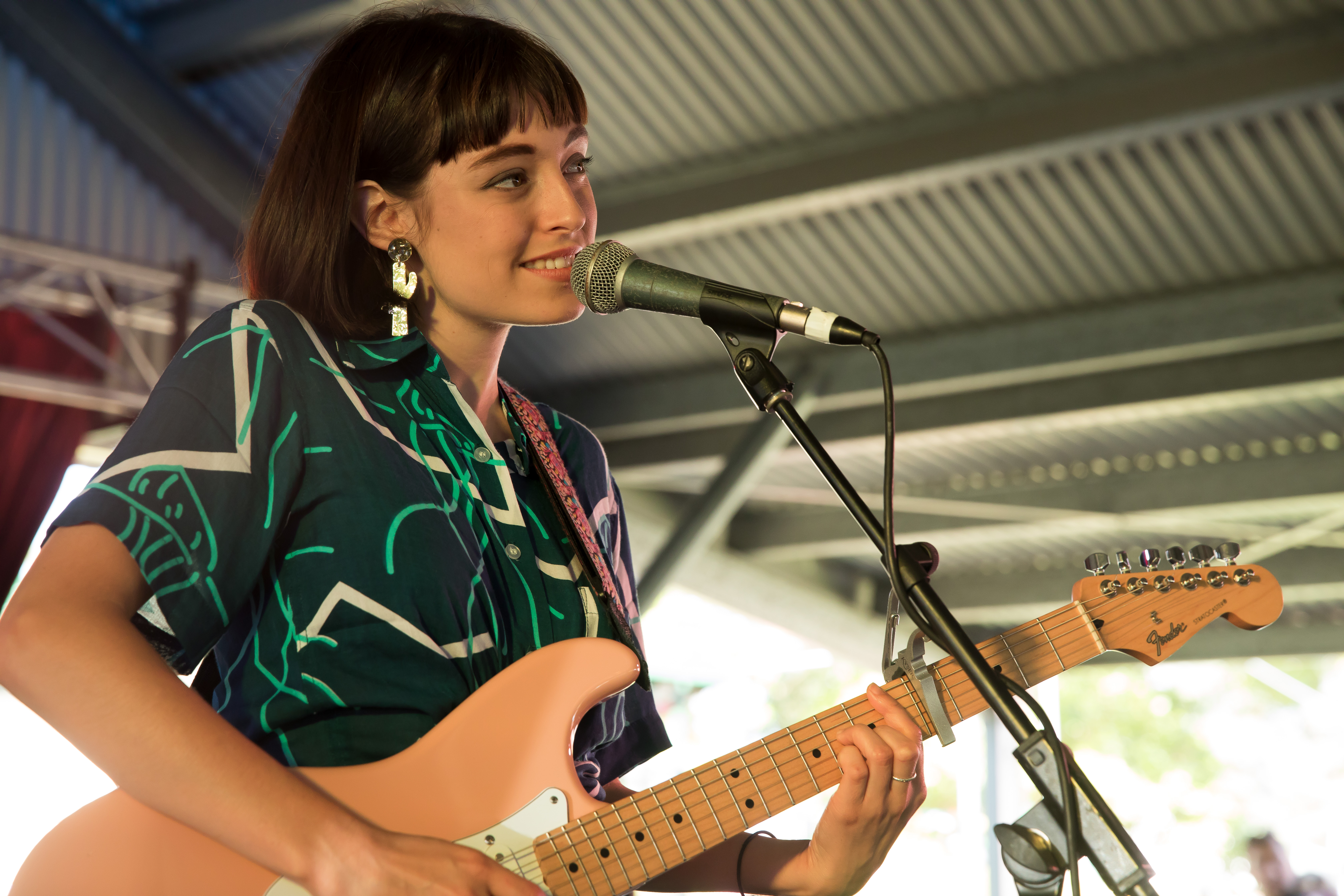
Donnelly performing in 2017

In 2017, while working two hospitality jobs and playing in a band, Donnelly released a collection of five demo tracks which formed her debut extended play (EP), Thrush Metal. It was released digitally and on cassette via Melbourne label Healthy Tapes. In 2018, the EP was reissued in the United States by the American label Secretly Canadian.

Donnelly released her debut studio album, Beware of the Dogs, on 8 March 2019 via Secretly Canadian. It received widespread acclaim from critics, including Robert Christgau, who praised it as a "musical encyclopedia of [male] assholes".

At the ARIA Music Awards of 2019, Beware of the Dogs was nominated for Breakthrough Artist. In October 2019, Donnelly was placed at number six in Happy Mag's list of the 15 Australian female artists "changing the game".

=== 2022–2024: Flood ===
In January 2022, Donnelly provided vocals for "Proof", a single from Methyl Ethel's fourth studio album, Are You Haunted? She also featured on ReWiggled, a 2022 tribute album to Australian children's music group the Wiggles, covering their song "Ba Ba Da Bicycle Ride."

On 10 May 2022, Donnelly premiered the song "Lungs" live on Triple J and announced her forthcoming second studio album, Flood. A music video for the song was also released, directed by herself and Duncan Wright. Two more singles – "Lungs" and "How Was Your Day?" – were released to promote the album before it was released on 26 August 2022. Following the release of the album, Donnelly embarked on a tour around the United Kingdom, Europe and North America that began in September.

=== 2025: Love and Fortune ===
On 11 September 2025, Stella Donnelly announced her third studio album Love and Fortune was set for release on 7 November 2025 via Dot Dash Recordings / Remote Control. She also released the single "Feel It Change".

== Personal life ==
For recreation, Donnelly enjoys playing squash, swimming at beaches, birdwatching, gardening, completing cryptic crosswords, cooking, rock climbing with her partner, and playing board games with friends. In an interview with The Line of Best Fit she said, "My version of taking a break [from recording and touring] is filling up my day with as many activities as possible."

Donnelly describes Billy Bragg and Courtney Barnett as musical influences.

=== Political views and activism ===
Donnelly is a supporter of various social and political causes. Her 2017 debut single "Boys Will Be Boys", written about societal attitudes towards women and her friend's experience of sexual assault, was dubbed a "#MeToo anthem".

Donnelly is opposed to the celebration of Australia Day. In a 2019 interview with The Guardian she said, "It's a really nationalist, white pride day... and it's actually a very historic day for Indigenous Australians – an invasion day, and a day of mourning." Donnelly supports same-sex marriage, and was "relieved", when it was legalised in Australia in 2017. Donnelly is pro-choice.

== Discography ==
=== Studio albums ===
List of studio albums with details and selected chart positions shown
| Title | Album details | Peak chart positions |
| Title | Album details | AUS |
|---|---|---|
| Beware of the Dogs | Released: 8 March 2019; Label: Stella Donnelly (SDCD001) Secretly Canadian (SC372); Formats: CD, LP, digital download, streaming, cassette | 15 |
| Flood | Released: 26 August 2022; Label: Stella Donnelly (SDCD002); Formats: CD, LP, digital download, streaming, cassette | 29 |
| Love and Fortune | Released: 7 November 2025; Label: Dot Dash Recordings; Formats: CD, LP, digital download, streaming | 31 |

=== EPs ===
List of extended plays with details shown
| Title | Details |
|---|---|
| Thrush Metal | Released: 6 April 2017; Label: Healthy Tapes (HT026); Formats: CD, 12" LP, digital download, streaming |

=== Singles ===
List of singles with year released and album name
| Title | Year | Album |
|---|---|---|
| "Mechanical Bull" | 2017 | Thrush Metal |
| "Boys Will Be Boys" (Note: "Boys Will Be Boys" is also included on Beware of the Dogs.) | 2017 | Thrush Metal |
| "Talking" (Note: "Talking" was originally a bonus track on the 2018 reissue of Thrush Metal before it was released digitally.) | 2018 | Thrush Metal |
| "Old Man" | 2019 | Beware of the Dogs |
| "Lunch" | 2019 | Beware of the Dogs |
| "Tricks" | 2019 | Beware of the Dogs |
| "Die" | 2019 | Beware of the Dogs |
| "Season's Greetings" | 2019 | Beware of the Dogs |
| "Love Is in the Air" (Triple J Like a Version) | 2020 | Non-album singles |
| "If I Could Cry (It Would Feel Like This)" | 2021 | Non-album singles |
| "Lungs" | 2022 | Flood |
| "Flood" | 2022 | Flood |
| "How Was Your Day?" | 2022 | Flood |
| "Baths" / "Standing Ovation" | 2025 | Love and Fortune |
| "Feel It Change" | 2025 | Love and Fortune |
| "Year of Trouble" | 2025 | Love and Fortune |
| "Laying Low" | 2025 | Love and Fortune |

=== Other contributions ===
List of songs contributed to other albums
| Title | Year | Album |
|---|---|---|
| "They Need Us" (with Feels) | 2018 | Non-album single |
| "Proof" (with Methyl Ethel) | 2022 | Are You Haunted? |
| "Ba Ba Da Bicycle Ride" (cover of the Wiggles) | 2022 | ReWiggled |

== Awards and nominations ==
=== AIR Awards ===
The Australian Independent Record Awards (commonly known informally as AIR Awards) is an annual awards night to recognise, promote and celebrate the success of Australia's Independent Music sector.

| Year | Nominee / work | Award | Result | Ref. |
|---|---|---|---|---|
| 2018 | Herself | Best Independent Artist | Nominated | |
| 2018 | Herself | Breakthrough Independent Artist | Nominated | |
| 2020 | Beware of the Dogs | Independent Album of the Year | Won | |
| 2020 | Beware of the Dogs | Best Independent Pop Album or EP | Won | |
| 2020 | Stella Donnelly | Breakthrough Independent Artist | Nominated | |
| 2026 | Love and Fortune | Best Independent Pop Album or EP | Nominated | |

=== APRA Awards ===
The APRA Awards are presented annually from 1982 by the Australasian Performing Right Association (APRA), "honouring composers and songwriters".

| Year | Nominee / work | Award | Result | Ref. |
|---|---|---|---|---|
| 2018 | "Boys Will Be Boys" | Song of the Year | Shortlisted | |
| 2020 | "Old Man" | Song of the Year | Shortlisted | |

=== J Awards ===
The J Awards are an annual series of Australian music awards that were established by the Australian Broadcasting Corporation's youth-focused radio station Triple J. They commenced in 2005.

| Year | Nominee / work | Award | Result | Ref. |
|---|---|---|---|---|
| 2017 | Herself | Unearthed Artist of the Year | Won | |
| 2019 | Beware of the Dogs | Australian Album of the Year | Nominated | |

=== National Live Music Awards ===
The National Live Music Awards (NLMAs) are a broad recognition of Australia's diverse live industry, celebrating the success of the Australian live scene. The awards commenced in 2016.

| Year | Nominee / work | Award | Result | Ref. |
|---|---|---|---|---|
| 2017 | Herself | Live Voice of the Year | Nominated | |
| 2017 | Herself | Best New Act of the Year | Nominated | |
| 2017 | Herself | Best Live Voice of the Year – People's Choice | Won | |
| 2017 | Herself | West Australian Live Voice of the Year | Won | |
| 2018 | Herself | Live Voice of the Year | Won | |
| 2018 | Herself | Live Pop Act of the Year | Nominated | |
| 2018 | Herself | International Live Achievement (Solo) | Nominated | |
| 2018 | Herself | Best Live Voice of the Year – People's Choice | Nominated | |
| 2018 | Herself | West Australian Live Voice of the Year | Won | |
| 2018 | Herself | West Australian Live Act of the Year | Won | |
| 2019 | Herself | Live Voice of the Year | Nominated | |
| 2019 | Herself | Live Guitarist of the Year | Nominated | |
| 2019 | Herself | International Live Achievement (Solo) | Won | |
| 2020 | Herself | Live Voice of the Year | Nominated | |
| 2020 | Herself | West Australian Live Act of the Year | Nominated | |

=== WAM Song of the Year ===
The WAM Song of the Year was formed by the Western Australian Rock Music Industry Association Inc. (WARMIA) in 1985, with its main aim to develop and run annual awards recognising achievements within the music industry in Western Australia.

| Year | Nominee / work | Award | Result (wins only) | Ref. |
|---|---|---|---|---|
| 2017/18 | "Boys Will Be Boys" | Pop Song of the Year | Won | |
| 2017/18 | "Boys Will Be Boys" | Grand Prize | Won | |
| 2018/19 | "They Need Us" (by Feels) | Electronic Song of the Year | Won | |

=== West Australian Music Industry Awards ===
The Western Australian Music Industry Awards (commonly known as WAMis) are annual awards presented to the local contemporary music industry, put on by the Western Australian Music Industry Association Inc. (WAM).

| Year | Nominee / work | Award | Result (wins only) | Ref. |
|---|---|---|---|---|
| 2017 | Herself | Best Female Vocalist | Won | |
| 2017 | Herself | Most Popular New Act | Won | |
| 2017 | Herself | Best Folk Act | Won | |
| 2017 | Thrush Metal | Best EP | Won | |
| 2017 | "Mechanical Bull" | Best Single | Won | |
| 2019 | Herself | Best Pop Act | Won | |
| 2019 | Beware of the Dogs | Best Album | Won | |
