= Marmoset (band) =

American indie rock band

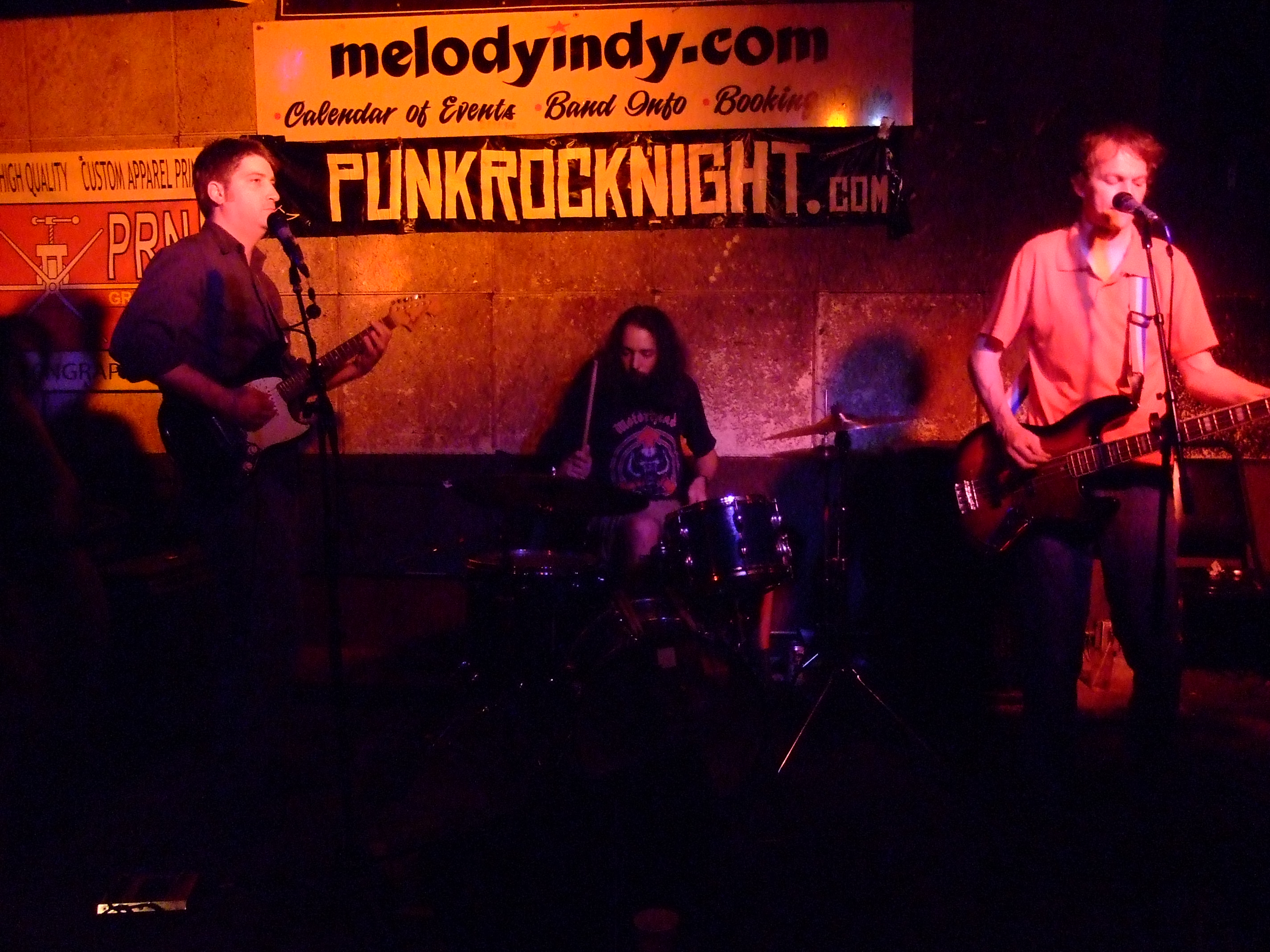
- Marmoset playing at the Melody Inn in 2008

Background information
- Origin: Indianapolis, Indiana, United States
- Genres: Indie rock; indie pop
- Years active: 1995–2015
- Labels: Secretly Canadian; Joyful Noise Recordings
- Members: Jorma Whittaker; Dave Jablonski; Jason Cavan
- Past members: LonPaul Ellrich

Marmoset is an American indie rock band based in Indianapolis, Indiana. The band was formed in 1995.

Marmoset's members are Jorma Whittaker (bass and vocals), Dave Jablonski (guitar and vocals), and Jason Cavan (drums). Frequent contributor and former full-time member LonPaul Ellrich died in 2008. The vinyl repressing of the album Record in Red is dedicated to his memory.

Marmoset has multiple releases on the Secretly Canadian label. In 2009, Marmoset signed to Joyful Noise Recordings.

== Critical reception ==
In a review of Florist Fired, Pitchfork called the band "one of Secretly Canadian's first and finest discoveries." In its 4-star review, AllMusic wrote that Today It's You is "reminiscent of indie-rock in the early 1980s -- touches of the occasionally dark, Velvet Underground-influenced jangle of the Feelies, Mission of Burma, the less cutesy work of the Television Personalities, even the later work of Wire." The Austin Chronicle wrote that "the jarring, twisted sensibilities of Indianapolis' Marmoset embody the best qualities of early Sebadoh, halting time and dissonant guitars building a teetering jungle-gym for Jorma Whitaker's odd, brown-paper-bag vocals." Tiny Mix Tapes panned Tea Torndao, writing that "no display of intellectual gymnastics can redeem a collection of pop songs as joyless as this."

Exclaim! deemed The Record In Red to be one of the best records of 2001. Indianapolis paper NUVO wrote that the band "could be considered local legends."

== Discography ==
- HiddenForbidden (1997)
- Today It's You (1999)
- The Record In Red (2001)
- Mishawaka (2002)
- Florist Fired (2007)
- Tea Tornado (2009)
