= Nightlands =

American band

- Origin: Philadelphia, Pennsylvania, U.S.
- Genres: Pop, rock
- Labels: Western Vinyl
- Members: Dave Hartley; Eliza Hardy Jones; Jesse Hale Moore; Scott Churchman
- Website: Nightlands bandcamp

Nightlands is an American band, a side-project of The War on Drugs bassist Dave Hartley.

Nightlands' 2017 album "I Can Feel the Night Around Me" received positive reviews from PopMatters, Under the Radar, Pitchfork, and other music publications.

== Members ==
- Anthony LaMarca – drums
- Eliza Hardy Jones – keys and vocals
- Jesse Hale Moore – keys and vocals
- Scott Churchman – bass

== Discography ==
- Forget the Mantra (Secretly Canadian, 2010)
- Oak Island (Secretly Canadian, 2013)
- I Can Feel the Night Around Me (Western Vinyl, 2017)
- Moonshine (Western Vinyl, 2022)
