= Bodies of Water =

American band

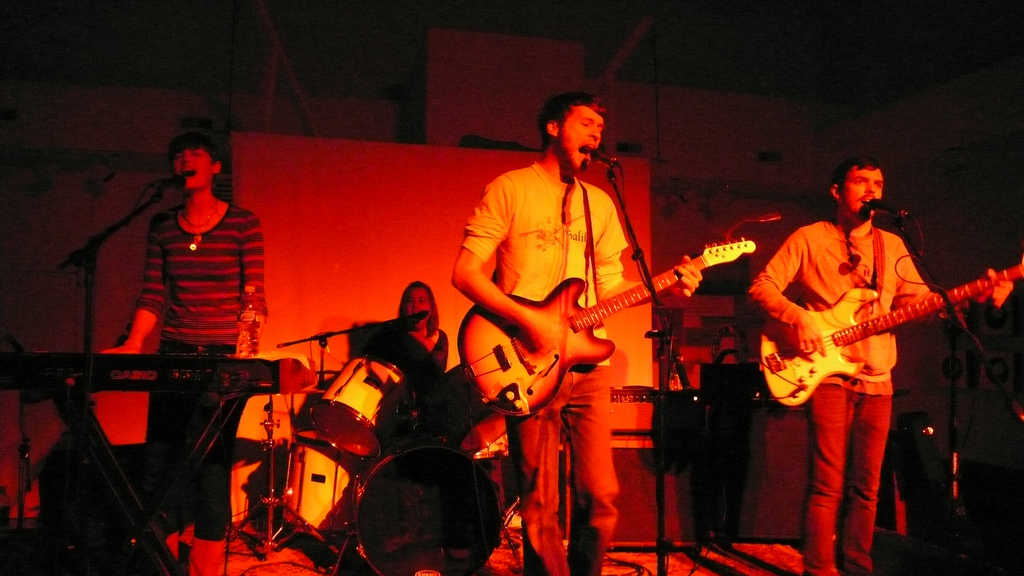
- Photo by Jennifer Jameson

Background information
- Origin: Los Angeles, California
- Genre: Indie rock
- Years active: 2003–present
- Label: Secretly Canadian
- Members: David Metcalf; Meredith Metcalf; Noah Smith
- Website: bodiesofwater.us

Bodies of Water is a band from the Highland Park neighborhood of Los Angeles, California, signed to independent record label Secretly Canadian. The core group consists of married couple David and Meredith Metcalf. However, the band often plays LA shows with five or more additional musicians, such as horn players, an additional drummer, and strings. All members of the band sing, including players added for local shows.

Bodies of Water's first EP and album were reviewed favorably by music critics such as Pitchfork Media and Rolling Stone magazine's New Music blog. Critics often compare their music to that of Ennio Morricone, Arcade Fire, The Mamas & the Papas, and label-mate Danielson. In interviews, the band lists gospel groups and Tropicalia musicians among its influences.

Bodies of Water's first full-length album Ears Will Pop & Eyes Will Blink was originally released on Bodies of Water's own Thousand Tongues label, and was only available in a few stores, at live shows, or directly from the band via their website. After Secretly Canadian signed Bodies of Water, the label re-released the album nationally on January 22, 2008.

The band's second album, titled A Certain Feeling, was released July 22, 2008 to generally favorable reviews.

== Discography ==
=== Albums ===
- Ears Will Pop & Eyes Will Blink (Secretly Canadian, 2007)
- A Certain Feeling (Secretly Canadian, 2008)
- Twist Again (Thousand Tongues, 2011)
- Spear in the City (Thousand Tongues, 2017)
- Is This What It's Like (Thousand Tongues, 2021)
- The Journey Is Our Home (Thousand Tongues, 2024)

=== EPs ===
- Bodies of Water (2005)

== Album reviews ==
=== A Certain Feeling ===
- Alarm Magazine
- Slant Magazine
- The Independent
- Pitchfork
- Crawdaddy

== Videography ==
- "I Heard It Sound" (2007, Grant Wenzlau)
- "Under the Pines" (2009, Andy Bruntel)
