= Magnet (magazine) =

American independent music magazine

Magnet Magazine
- Editor: Eric T. Miller
- Categories: Music magazine
- Frequency: Monthly
- Publisher: Alex Mulcahy
- Founded: 1993
- Country: United States
- Based in: Philadelphia
- Language: English
- Website: magnetmagazine.com
- ISSN: 1088-7806

Magnet is a music magazine that generally focuses on alternative, independent, or out-of-the-mainstream bands.

== History ==
The magazine is published four times a year, and is independently owned and edited by Eric T. Miller. Music magazines with a similar focus in the 1990s era included Option, Ray Gun, and Alternative Press. The first issue of Magnet came out in mid-1993. Examples of cover stars over the years include Yo La Tengo (1993, 2000), The Afghan Whigs (1994), Spacemen 3 (1997), Shudder To Think (1997), Tortoise/ Swervedriver (1998), Sonic Youth (1998), Sunny Day Real Estate (1998), Ween (2000), Ride (2002), Interpol (2003), Hüsker Dü (2005), and Cat Power (2007).

The magazine's content tends to focus on up-and-coming indie bands and expositions of various music scenes. Examples include long pieces on the Denton, TX psychedelic rock scene (1997), the New York City "Illbient" scene (1997), the history of power pop (2002), the Cleveland avant-punk scene of the 1970s, the Minneapolis college-rock scene of the 1980s (2005), the California "Paisley Underground" bands of the 1980s (2001), and the resurgence of the Shoegaze movement (2002). Also common is the "artists within a construct" theme—e.g., the "Eccentrics And Dreamers" issue (2003) featuring various "outsider" artists.

Beginning in early 1997, subscribers to each issue receive a sampler CD. Record labels pay the magazine to have songs put on the CDs, meaning that inclusion signified no endorsement from the staff of Magnet, although bands would claim otherwise, leading to moderate controversy over the years. The songs on the CDs sometimes have little to do with the type of music covered by the magazine.

Though the magazine's focus for the first five years or so of its existence was experimental/underground music, its focus at the turn of the century broadened to include an emphasis on covering alt-country and indie acts such as Wilco, Steve Earle, The New Pornographers, The Shins, and even more established acts such as Tom Petty. Despite this, it still maintains a section devoted to free jazz and obscure electronic-based music in each issue. It has also done long articles on jazz icons Albert Ayler, Ken Vandermark, and Ornette Coleman. The photographic style of subjects has also evolved from inventive avant-garde settings to stark, no-frills closeups of band members. Magnet has paid much less attention over the years to the metal and rap genres.

The first issue of each year features a faux-retrospective look on that year, predicting various absurdist musical occurrences; this is always penned by Phil Sheridan. More recently, Andrew Earles has written a parodic feature entitled "Where's The Street Team?" which tends to address overhyped bands and their fans.

The magazine stopped being offered in print form after the 80th edition in 2008, but continued to use the Magnet brand name on their website. In October 2011 it returned as a monthly print magazine featuring Wilco on the cover of the first of the relaunch issues. There appears to be no free CD.
