= Skyscraper (magazine) =

Skyscraper was an independent music magazine dedicated to coverage of a wide range of progressive and underground music. It was founded by Peter Bottomley and Andrew Bottomley in 1997 and published its first issue in 1998. Its headquarters was in Boulder, Colorado. The magazine covers various genres of music and is often likened to an American version of Mojo. Its format includes in-depth interviews, music reviews, and articles covering books, film, comics, and social and political issues. The quarterly print edition of Skyscraper discontinued after the Spring 2009 issue. The founders started an online magazine in 2010.
