= Secretly Canadian =

American independent record label

- Parent company: MGM Music
- Founded: 1996
- Founder: Chris Swanson; Ben Swanson; Eric Weddle; Jonathan Cargill
- Distributor: Secretly Distribution
- Genre: Various
- Country of origin: United States
- Location: Bloomington, Indiana
- Official website: secretlycanadian.com

Secretly Canadian is an American record label based in Bloomington, Indiana, part of the Secretly Group and owned by MGM Music. The Secretly Group includes record labels Dead Oceans and Jagjaguwar as well as a music publisher known as Secretly Publishing, representing artists, writers, film makers, producers, and comedians.

== History ==
Secretly Canadian was founded in 1996 by Chris and Ben Swanson, Eric Weddle, and Jonathan Cargill while they attended Indiana University. Before Secretly Canadian was founded, Chris Swanson and Eric Weddle met in 1995 in Indiana University's campus radio station, WIUX. Then Chris met Jonathan Cargill through a job at the Collins Living-Learning Center cafeteria on campus. Soon after, Chris' younger brother Ben Swanson moved to Bloomington to earn his undergraduate degree from the Jacobs School of Music in musicology.

In 1996, Secretly Canadian was founded. The label's first official release was a re-issue of an album by June Panic from Grand Forks, North Dakota; the Glory Hole CD. The second release in 1997 was Jason Molina's, under the Songs: Ohia moniker, often referred to as "The Black Album". After the Swanson brothers tracked down Molina's email address and drove hours to Molina's in-store gig at Adult Crash in New York. After signing Molina, the record label became more popular in the indie music scene. Secretly Canadian then signed Marmoset and Swearing At Motorists. Weddle soon left to form label Family Vineyard – and later followed by Cargill as well. After that, Chris Swanson and Darius Van Arman became friends in 1999 and Secretly Canadian joined forces with Van Arman's Jagjaguwar.

The early 2000s yielded reissues from Swell Maps, Nikki Sudden, and Danielson. Damien Jurado, the Seattle singer-songwriter, made his way to Secretly Canadian in 2002. Two years later, Jens Lekman joined the label's roster.

Anohni also signed to the label in the 2000s. Formerly known as Antony and the Johnsons earlier in her career, the Swanson brothers became enamored with Antony and the Johnsons’ self-titled debut from 2000. Antony and the Johnsons’ first record with Secretly Canadian, I Am a Bird Now, released in 2005, sold 100,000 copies in the first two months.

Secretly Canadian then signed The War on Drugs, the Philadelphia-based band whose third record, Lost in the Dream, struck as both a critical and commercial success in 2014. Secretly Canadian also began a partnership with Chimera Records in the form of Yoko Ono's reissues beginning in 2016, and the debut release from William Eggleston, in 2017. Secretly Canadian's roster also includes Cherry Glazerr, Whitney, Alex Cameron, Joey Dosik, Stella Donnelly, Faye Webster, and serpentwithfeet, among many others.

In 2007, the addition of Dead Oceans to Secretly Canadian and Jagjaguwar's partnership led to the formation of Secretly Group. In 2015, Secretly Group began a partnership with The Numero Group as well.

In 2018, Secretly Canadian was listed as #8 on Paste Magazine's top 10 record labels of 2018. Jagjaguwar was listed as #4 and Dead Oceans was listed as #7.

== Artists ==
- Alasdair Roberts
- Alex Cameron
- Anohni
- Anohni and the Johnsons
- Ativin
- Ben Abraham
- BLK JKS
- Bobb Trimble
- Bodies of Water
- Catfish Haven
- Cayucas
- Cherry Glazerr
- Damien Jurado
- Danielson
- Dave Fischoff
- David Vandervelde
- Don Lennon
- Dungeonesse
- Early Day Miners
- Electric Youth
- Emily Angeles
- Faye Webster
- Foreign Born
- Frida Hyvonen
- Gardens & Villa
- Havergal
- The Horns of Happiness
- I Love You But I've Chosen Darkness
- The Impossible Shapes
- Instruments of Science & Technology
- Intro to Airlift
- Jason Molina
- The Japonize Elephants
- Jens Lekman
- JJ
- Joey Dosik
- Jorma Whittaker
- June Panic
- Little Scream
- Loren Kramar
- Luke Temple
- Magnolia Electric Co.
- Major Lazer
- Makeness
- Marmoset
- Molina and Johnson
- Music Go Music
- Nightlands
- Nikki Sudden & The Jacobites
- Nite Jewel
- Normanoak
- The Panoply Academy
- Porcelain Raft
- Porridge Radio
- Racebannon
- Richard Swift
- Scout Niblett
- serpentwithfeet
- She-Devils
- Shura
- Simon Joyner
- Songs: Ohia
- Stella Donnelly
- Steven A. Clark
- Suuns
- Suzanne Langille & Loren MazzaCane Connors
- Swearing at Motorists
- Swell Maps
- Taken By Trees
- Throw Me The Statue
- Tig Notaro
- Tomas Barfod
- Tren Brothers
- The War on Drugs
- Whitney
- Windsor for the Derby
- Woman's Hour
- Yeah Yeah Yeahs
- Yeasayer
- Yoko Ono
- Zero Boys

== Notable awards and honors ==
A2IM LIBERA AWARDS (US)

- 2015, Secretly Canadian, Label of the Year (finalist)
- 2014, Secretly Canadian, Label of the Year (finalist)

AIM INDEPENDENT MUSIC AWARDS (UK)

- 2014, Secretly Group – Independent Label of the Year (nominated)
