= Her New Knife =

American shoegaze band

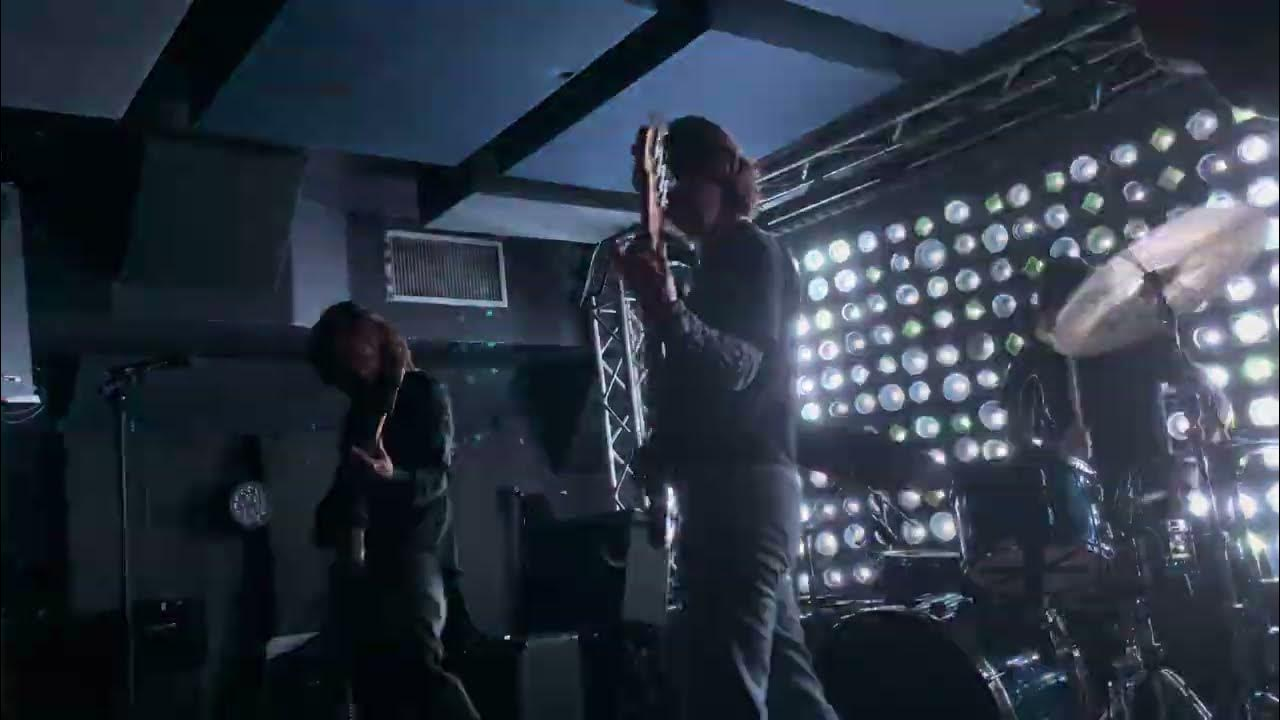
- Her New Knife in 2025

Background information
- Origin: Tallahassee, Florida, U.S.
- Genres: Shoegaze, noise rock
- Years active: 2020–present
- Labels: Many Hats; Julia's War
- Members: Edgar Atencio; Ben Kachler; Carolina Schooley; Elijah Ford

Her New Knife is an American shoegaze band formed in Tallahassee, Florida in 2020 and currently based in Philadelphia, Pennsylvania. It comprises vocalist-guitarist Edgar Atencio, drummer Elijah Ford, guitarist Ben Kachler and bassist Carolina Schooley. Their music has been variously described as shoegaze, noise rock, and indie rock.

== History ==
The quartet formed at Florida State University in 2020 and relocated to Philadelphia in 2022. In fall 2024, the band embarked on their first tour in support of Julie, during which they released the Chrome Is Lullaby EP.

In fall 2025, Her New Knife toured with Water from Your Eyes on their It's a Beautiful Place Tour.

In fall 2026, the band supported The Garden on their Bootleg Tour and Slow Pulp on their Melodie Tour.

== Musical style and influences ==
Cady Siregar of The Fader felt Her New Knife "followed in the footsteps" of other rock bands like Spirit of the Beehive and They Are Gutting a Body of Water. While Stereogum's Abby Jones commented on their song "Purepurepure", saying that it "toes the line between melodic and uneasy, driven by an eerie bassline that seems to creep along Edgar Atencio's whispery vocals." Their genre has often been classified as indie rock, shoegaze and noise rock among others. (Note: Musical styles: "shoegaze"; "post-punk"; "noise rock"; "indie rock")

== Band members ==
Current

- Edgar Atencio – vocals, guitar
- Ben Kachler – guitar
- Carolina Schooley – bassist
- Elijah Ford – drums

== Tours ==
As a co-headliner

- My Anti-Aircraft Friend Tour (with Julie) (2024)
- It's a Beautiful Place Tour (with Water from Your Eyes) (2025)

== Discography ==
=== Studio albums ===
Title	Details
Nightcore+++	Released: February 16, 2024; Label: Self-released; Format: Digital download, streaming

=== Extended plays ===
Title	Details
Destroza	Released: April 16, 2021; Label: Self-released; Format: Digital download, streaming
Lead Dreams/Flayed So Light	Released: March 17, 2023; Label: Self-released; Format: Digital download, streaming
Chrome Is Lullaby	Released: October 24, 2024; Label: Julia's War; Format: Digital download, streaming
