= Time of the Blue =

"Time Of The Blue"

Single by The Tallest Man On Earth
- Released: June 15, 2016
- Genre: Indie folk
- Length: 3:46
- Label: Dead Oceans
- Songwriter(s): Kristian Matsson

The Tallest Man On Earth singles chronology
"Dark Bird Is Home" (2015)	"Time Of The Blue" (2016)

Time Of The Blue is a single released by Swedish indie folk musician The Tallest Man On Earth. It was the first single to be released since the album Dark Bird Is Home. It shows a departure from Matsson's previous release, which featured heavy instrumentation apart from only him and his guitar. Time of The Blue is more acoustic, recalling past releases like There's No Leaving Now. The song was released on June 15, 2016.
