= Who Is the Sender? =

Studio album by Bill Fay
- Released: April 2015
- Genre: Progressive folk
- Label: Dead Oceans

Bill Fay chronology
Life Is People (2012)	Who Is the Sender? (2015)	Countless Branches (2020)

Who Is the Sender? is the fifth studio album by English singer, pianist and songwriter Bill Fay, released by Dead Oceans in April 2015 by Dead Oceans. The second album track, "War Machine", was released in February 2015. The closing track, "I Hear You Calling (Studio Reunion)", was originally recorded for Fay's 1971 album Time of the Last Persecution.

== Reception ==
Professional ratings
Aggregate scores
Source	Rating
Metacritic	76/100
Review scores
Source	Rating
AllMusic	4/5 stars
The Guardian	4/5 stars
Pitchfork Media	7.4/10.0

At Metacritic, which assigns a normalised rating out of 100 to reviews from mainstream critics, Who Is the Sender? received an average score of 76, based on 13 reviews, indicating "generally favorable reviews". AllMusic reviewer Thom Jurek said that the album contains "simple, profound songs" that "embrace the totality of earthly experience in the presence of the Divine". Dave Simpson of the Guardian called the album "beautifully hymnal" and said that "throughout, [Fay's] craft and enduring fascination with music itself is rather humbling." Pitchfork Media's Grayson Currin said that it "moves [Fay] from the category of a curiosity who returned after a four-decade absence to make a third great album to someone perhaps capable of doing so in perpetuity." In a review for the New York Times, Ben Ratliff said that Fay "means well" but that the album was "a trudge, and strangely ponderous in its smallness."

== Track listing ==
No.	Title	Length
1.	"The Geese Are Flying Westward"	2:58
2.	"War Machine"	4:12
3.	"How Little?"	6:03
4.	"Underneath the Sun"	5:40
5.	"Something Else Ahead"	3:11
6.	"Order of the Day"	3:39
7.	"Who Is the Sender?"	4:56
8.	"The Freedom to Read"	4:12
9.	"Bring It On Lord"	3:52
10.	"A Page Incomplete"	3:11
11.	"A Frail and Broken One"	4:29
12.	"World of Life"	5:02
13.	"I Hear You Calling (Studio Reunion)"	3:41
