= Countless Branches =

Studio album by Bill Fay
- Released: 17 January 2020
- Length: 47:18
- Label: Dead Oceans
- Producer: Joshua Henry

Bill Fay chronology
Who Is the Sender? (2015)	Countless Branches (2020)

Singles from Countless Branches
- 1. "Filled With Wonder Once Again" Released: 12 November 2019

Countless Branches is the sixth and final studio album by English musician Bill Fay. It was released on 17 January 2020 under Dead Oceans.

The album marks 50 years since Fay's debut self-titled album in 1970.

== Critical reception ==
Professional ratings
Aggregate scores
Source	Rating
Metacritic	84/100
Review scores
Source	Rating
AllMusic	4.5/5 stars
The Line of Best Fit	8.5/10
MusicOMH	4/5 stars

Countless Branches was met with acclaim from critics. Aggregator Album of the Year gave the album an 82 out of 100 based on 10 reviews from a critical consensus.

== Track listing ==
Countless Branches track listing
No.	Title	Length
1.	"In Human Hands"	2:19
2.	"How Long, How Long"	2:43
3.	"Your Little Face"	2:44
4.	"Salt of the Earth"	3:39
5.	"I Will Remain Here"	2:06
6.	"Filled with Wonder Once Again"	3:07
7.	"Time's Going Somewhere"	2:42
8.	"Love Will Remain"	2:24
9.	"Countless Branches"	2:20
10.	"One Life"	2:47

iTunes Deluxe Edition
No.	Title	Length
11.	"Tiny (Bonus Track)"	2:56
12.	"Don't Let My Marigolds Die (Live)"	2:17
13.	"The Rooster (Bonus Track)"	3:16
14.	"Your Little Face (Acoustic version)"	2:18
15.	"Filled with Wonder Once Again"	4:19
16.	"How Long, How Long"	2:43
17.	"Love Will Remain"	2:38

== Charts ==
Chart performance for Countless Branches
Chart (2020)	Peak position
Belgian Albums (Ultratop Flanders)	167
Scottish Albums (Official Charts)	97
UK Independent Albums (Official Charts)	16
