= Life Is People =

Studio album by Bill Fay
- Released: 21 August 2012
- Recorded: Snap, London
- Genre: Progressive folk
- Length: 58:27
- Label: Dead Oceans

Bill Fay chronology
| Still Some Light (2010) | Life Is People (2012) | Who Is the Sender? (2015) |

Life Is People is the fourth studio album by English singer, pianist and songwriter Bill Fay, released by Dead Oceans in August 2012. Fay had been without a record label after being dropped by Deram Records following the release of his second album, Time of the Last Persecution in 1971, and could not secure a release for his third album Tomorrow, Tomorrow & Tomorrow. To support himself, Fay took various jobs outside of the music industry, while continuing to record music at home. In 1998, Fay's first two albums were reissued on compact disc by British record label See for Miles Records, prompting a revival of interest in his work, and Tomorrow, Tomorrow & Tomorrow was finally released in 2005.

Fay was persuaded to return to the studio to record a new album by American record producer Joshua Henry, who was a fan of Fay's Deram albums after he had heard them played by his father. Fay and Henry assembled a group of musicians that included guitarist Ray Russell and drummer Alan Rushton, who had both played on Time of the Last Persecution. Recording took place across ten days at Snap Studios in North London with engineer Guy Massey. It was released to critical acclaim, featuring on several critic's year-end lists and reaching number 56 on the UK Albums Chart. Fay donated the proceeds from the album to the humanitarian aid organisation Médecins Sans Frontières.

== Background and recording ==
Bill Fay released his first two albums, Bill Fay (1970) and Time of the Last Persecution (1971), on the Deram Records label. The recordings did not perform well and Fay was dropped from Deram soon after the release of his second album. After failing to secure another recording contract, Fay took various jobs including fruit picking, working in a factory and in a supermarket. Fay continued to write songs and entered the studio with a group of musicians in the late 1970s and early 1980s. Tapes of the resulting album, Tomorrow, Tomorrow & Tomorrow, were sent to twelve record companies but the album did not receive a release. In 1998, British record label See for Miles Records re-issued Bill Fay and Time of the Last Persecution on compact disc, reviving interest in Fay's work. Wilco singer Jeff Tweedy, who sang Fay's "Be Not So Fearful" during the 2002 Wilco documentary I Am Trying to Break Your Heart, Current 93's David Tibet, Okkervil River's Will Sheff, R.E.M. guitarist Peter Buck, Jim O'Rourke and Nick Cave declared themselves fans of Fay's music.

In 2004, Wooden Hill Records released a collection of demos entitled From the Bottom of an Old Grandfather Clock, and Tomorrow, Tomorrow & Tomorrow was eventually released in 2005 on David Tibet's Durtro label. After Wilco began covering "Be Not So Fearful" during their live sets, Jeff Tweedy persuaded Fay to join the band onstage to sing a duet on the song at a concert at Shepherd's Bush Empire in 2007. Tweedy offered Fay an opportunity to record an album with Wilco in Chicago, but Fay declined. Another collection of demos, Still Some Light, was released in 2010 by Tibet's Coptic Cat label.

In 2012, Fay was approached by American record producer Joshua Henry, who convinced Fay to record a new album. Henry, who was familiar with Fay's work through his father's record collection, originally planned to reproduce some of Fay's unused home recordings at London's Abbey Road Studios. Fay compiled a CD of his unreleased music and sent it to Henry, who played it to Dead Oceans founder Chris Swanson. Swanson liked the songs and Fay signed a contract with the label to record and release the album. A band of musicians including guitarist Ray Russell and drummer Alan Rushton, who had both played on Time of the Last Persecution, was assembled and recording eventually took place across ten days at Snap Studios in North London with engineer Guy Massey. The first song recorded for the album was "Be at Peace With Yourself", which had previously appeared in demo form on Still Some Light.

== Music and lyrics ==
Life Is People is a singer-songwriter album that contains twelve tracks with a total running time of 58 minutes. Eleven tracks were written by Fay. The piano ballad "Jesus, Etc." is a cover version of a Wilco song originally written by Jay Bennett and Jeff Tweedy, which first appeared on their 2002 album Yankee Hotel Foxtrot. "This World", which was described by Grayson Currin of Pitchfork Media as one of the album's key songs, features additional vocals from Tweedy that were recorded at the Loft studio in Chicago. Life Is People's lyrics were described by Thom Jurek as "bittersweet reflections on wasted life, loss, death, grief, environmental apocalypse, and human frailty ... balanced by themes that affirm tolerance, healing, love, and spiritual redemption." Currin described the songs as "pleas for redemption in a world drunk on its promise, coupled with a reassuring contentment for simply having lived this life." The song "City of Dreams", the lyrics of which refer to a street sweeper, was written by Fay 15 years before it was recorded. The album's title is derived from the song "Cosmic Concerto (Life Is People)", which refers to a comment made to Fay by his father while they were observing passers-by during a childhood visit to the seaside. "Be at Peace With Yourself", which begins with "liturgical" organ and piano, features a gospel choir and was described as the album's "centerpiece".

== Release ==
News of a new Bill Fay album was announced on 31 May 2012 by Dead Oceans, and the first new song appeared when "Never Ending Happening" premiered on National Public Radio's All Songs Considered program on 26 June. A promotional video for "Be at Peace With Yourself", produced by Dan Huiting, was released on 9 July. Life Is People was made available for streaming in its entirety by Paste magazine on 20 August, and was released by Dead Oceans the following day on compact disc, double vinyl LP and digital download. A bonus track, "Home Was the Place", was included in the iTunes release. A promotional video for "This World", directed by Califone singer Tim Rutili, was premiered on 27 August. The video contained Super 8 film images projected onto people's faces, including that of Jesus Lizard frontman David Yow.

Life Is People entered the UK Albums Chart during the week ending 1 September 2012 and peaked at number 56. In the United States, the album reached number 15 on the Heatseekers Albums chart. Fay donated the proceeds of the record to the humanitarian aid organisation Médecins Sans Frontières, known for its work in war-torn regions and developing countries.

== Reception ==
Professional ratings
Aggregate scores
| Source | Rating |
|---|---|
| Metacritic | 86/100 |
Review scores
| Source | Rating |
| AllMusic | 4/5 stars |
| Consequence of Sound | 4/5 stars |
| The Daily Telegraph | 5/5 stars |
| The Independent | 5/5 stars |
| Mojo | 5/5 stars |
| musicOMH | 4/5 stars |
| Pitchfork | 8.0/10 |
| PopMatters | 7/10 |
| Record Collector | 5/5 stars |
| Uncut | 9/10 |

At Metacritic, which assigns a normalised rating out of 100 to reviews from mainstream critics, Life Is People received an average score of 86, based on 21 reviews, indicating "universal acclaim". In his review for AllMusic, Thom Jurek stated that "Fay performs these songs as if they were living things, independent of his inner world. His reverence for them makes the listening experience one of great emotional depth. Life Is People brims with compassion, vulnerability, and tenderness. It is not a comeback record but a late continuation, a great work of art." Drew Litowitz of Consequence of Sound wrote that "little has changed. Fay's songs sound as if they've simply been hanging out in the ether for all these years, just waiting to be put to tape...Life Is People makes a strong argument for why Fay deserves recognition, and not just by those in the know." The Daily Telegraph's Neil McCormick called the album a "belated triumph" which "unfolds with the assurance of an old master still burning with the desire to tell his tales", saying that it was "so much stronger than the latter-day works of many of Fay's contemporaries." Critic Tom Hughes of The Guardian was less complimentary, noting that the album was "not without a few syrupy moments, and it would be a push to recommend it over the old records" but concluded that "there are some fine songs here." Andy Gill, writing for The Independent, said that "Fay has finally created the masterpiece that will secure his reputation" and added that Life is People was "truly, the album of a lifetime."

Daniel Paton of musicOMH said that "Life Is People may not quite be the masterpiece so many people dearly want it to be...that being said, there are moments here so sublime and moving that could only have come from Fay." Pitchfork reviewer Grayson Currin remarked that "Life Is People and the tale that accompany it are strong enough...to at last make [Fay's] reputation among many match his legacy among few", saying that "at the risk of overstating the case, Life Is People—the work of a 69-year-old family man, and the work of a lifetime—confirms its maker's own thesis." Critic Maria Schurr of PopMatters wrote that "one half of Fay's Life Is People proves worthy of such a long wait...those who Life Is People touches are unlikely to hear a more inspiring album this year." Prefix magazine's Matthew Fiander stated that while it "does have its missteps...Life is People may not be the best Bill Fay, but hearing this there is no doubt about one thing: it's great to have him back. And hopefully this record is just the start of that return."

Life Is People was featured in several publications' end of year lists, ranking at number three on Mojo's list of the best albums of 2012, number six on Uncut's list and number 19 on BBC Music. Nicky Wire of Manic Street Preachers named it one of his favourite records and as an influence on the band's album Rewind the Film (2013).

== Track listing ==
All songs written by Bill Fay except where noted.

| No. | Title | Writer(s) | Length |
|---|---|---|---|
| 1. | "There Is a Valley" | | 4:16 |
| 2. | "Big Painter" | | 3:59 |
| 3. | "Never Ending Happening" | | 3:44 |
| 4. | "This World" | | 3:43 |
| 5. | "The Healing Day" | | 5:14 |
| 6. | "City of Dreams" | | 6:11 |
| 7. | "Be at Peace with Yourself" | | 5:01 |
| 8. | "Jesus, Etc." | Jay Bennett, Jeff Tweedy | 4:17 |
| 9. | "Empires" | | 3:23 |
| 10. | "Thank You Lord" | | 3:14 |
| 11. | "Cosmic Concerto (Life Is People)" | | 7:56 |
| 12. | "The Coast No Man Can Tell" | | 3:07 |
| Total length: | | | 58:27 |

iTunes bonus track
| No. | Title | Length |
|---|---|---|
| 13. | "Home Was the Place" | 4:26 |
| Total length: | | 62:53 |

== Personnel ==
Credits are adapted from the album's liner notes.

Musicians

- Bill Fay – piano, vocals
- Ray Russell – electric guitar, nylon-string guitar
- Alan Rushton – drums, percussion
- Matt Deighton — electric guitar, acoustic guitar, backing vocals
- Mikey Rowe — piano, Wurlitzer, Rhodes, mellotron, Hammond B3, celeste, vibraphone
- Matt Armstrong – bass guitar
- Tim Weller — drums, percussion
- Ian Burdge – cello
- Jeff Tweedy – vocals on "This World", acoustic guitar on "cosmic concerto"
- London Community Gospel Choir – choir
- Vulcan String Quartet – strings

Technical personnel

- Joshua Henry – record producer
- Guy Massey — recording, mixing, mastering
- Ben Mclusky – engineering assistance
- Steve Rooke — mastering
- Steve Gullick – photography
