= Sometimes the Blues Is Just a Passing Bird =

EP by the Tallest Man on Earth
- Released: 6 September 2010
- Genre: Folk
- Length: 17:20
- Label: Dead Oceans
- Producer: Kristian Matsson

The Tallest Man on Earth chronology
The Wild Hunt (2010)	Sometimes the Blues Is Just a Passing Bird (2010)	There's No Leaving Now (2012)

Professional ratings
Aggregate scores
Source	Rating
AnyDecentMusic?	7.9/10
Metacritic	84/100
Review scores
Source	Rating
AllMusic	3.5/5 stars
Alternative Press	4/5 stars
The A.V. Club	A−
Consequence of Sound	4.5/5 stars
Now	4/5 stars
Paste	9.1/10
Pitchfork	7.8/10
PopMatters	8/10
Sputnikmusic	3.5/5
Under the Radar	7/10

Sometimes the Blues Is Just a Passing Bird is an EP by Swedish musician the Tallest Man on Earth. It was released on 6 September 2010 by Dead Oceans.

It marks one of Kristian Matsson's first incorporations of electric guitar sound, on "The Dreamer". "Like the Wheel" appears as a bonus track on his 2010 album The Wild Hunt, rewritten to include nothing but piano and vocals.

== Track listing ==
All tracks are written by Kristian Matsson.

No.	Title	Length
1.	"Little River"	3:46
2.	"The Dreamer"	4:06
3.	"Like the Wheel"	3:28
4.	"Tangle in This Trampled Wheat"	3:03
5.	"Thrown Right at Me"	2:59
Total length:		17:20

== Charts ==
Chart (2010)	Peak position
US Americana/Folk Albums (Billboard)	8
US Heatseekers Albums (Billboard)	5
US Independent Albums (Billboard)	47
