= Martin Crane (disambiguation) =

Martin Crane is a character of the television series Frasier.

Martin Crane may also refer to:

- Martin Crane (bishop) (1818–1901), of the Diocese of Sandhurst, Australia
- Martin McNulty Crane (1855–1943), American politician in Texas
- Martin McNulty Crane, singer-songwriter and frontman of the band Brazos
- Martin Crane, a character in Skylark of Valeron
- Martin Crane, a character in The Masked Marvel
