= Chrome Is Lullaby =

EP by Her New Knife
- Released: October 24, 2024
- Genre: Shoegaze
- Length: 20:47
- Label: Julia's War; Many Hats
- Producer: Ian Norris; Dylan Vaisey; Adris Raal

Her New Knife chronology
| Nightcore+++ (2024) | Chrome Is Lullaby (2024) |

Alternate cover
- :re edition cover

Chrome Is Lullaby is the third extended play (EP) by American shoegaze band Her New Knife. The album was released on October 24, 2024, through Julia's War and was supported by one single. Her New Knife collaborated with the producers Ian Norris, Dylan Vaisey and Adris Raal and would begin working on new material in 2024.

== Background and release ==
During Her New Knife's tour with Julie and They Are Gutting a Body of Water, they would release Chrome Is Lullaby. The album is a six-track collection of shoegaze influences. Chrome Is Lullaby was supported by one single "purepurepure," released on October 8, 2024. The album would later release on October 24, 2024, through Julia's War Recordings. A remix version for the album would be announce and is set to release on October 31, 2025.

== Critical reception ==
Cady Siregar of The Fader felt the album incorporated "guttural instrumentation and shoegazey post-punk that calls to mind Duster." While Post-Trash's Giliann Karon felt that the EP was "dazzling" with "nuances allow their heavy drones and gloomy textures to peek through."

== Track listing ==
| No. | Title | Writer(s) | Producer(s) | Length |
|---|---|---|---|---|
| 1. | "Kittyriff" | Edgar Atencio; Ben Kachler; Carolina Schooley; Elijah Fordl | Ian Norris; Dylan Vaisey; Adris Raal | 3:02 |
| 2. | "Purepurepure" | Atencio; Kachler; Schooley; Fordl | Norris; Vaisey; Raal | 3:21 |
| 3. | "Vitamin Beauty" | Atencio; Kachler; Schooley; Fordl | Norris; Vaisey; Raal | 2:44 |
| 4. | "12r" | Atencio; Kachler; Schooley; Fordl | Norris; Vaisey; Raal | 3:16 |
| 5. | "Skinny/Baby" | Atencio; Kachler; Schooley; Fordl | Norris; Vaisey; Raal | 4:07 |
| 6. | "Vesselera" | Atencio; Kachler; Schooley; Fordl | Norris; Vaisey; Raal | 4:16 |

== Personnel ==
Credits adapted from Tidal.

- Edgar Atencio – songwriting
- Adris Raal – production
- Carolina Schooley – songwriting
- Dylan Vaisey – production
- Elijah Ford – songwriting
- Ian Norris – production
- Ben Kachler – songwriting

== Release history ==
Release dates and formats for Chrome Is Lullaby
| Region | Date | Format(s) | Version | Label | Ref. |
|---|---|---|---|---|---|
| Various | October 24, 2024 | Digital download; streaming; LP; CD | Original | Julia's War Recordings | |
