= Dark Bird Is Home =

2015 studio album by the Tallest Man on Earth

Studio album by the Tallest Man on Earth
- Released: 12 May 2015
- Genre: Folk
- Length: 41:53
- Language: English
- Label: Dead Oceans
- Producer: Kristian Matsson

The Tallest Man on Earth chronology
There's No Leaving Now (2012)	Dark Bird Is Home (2015)	I Love You. It's a Fever Dream. (2019)

Singles from Dark Bird Is Home
- 1. "Sagres" Released: 25 February 2015; 2. "Dark Bird Is Home" Released: 14 April 2015; 3. "Darkness of the Dream" Released: 10 November 2015

Dark Bird Is Home is the fourth LP by the Tallest Man on Earth. It was released on CD, digital and vinyl on 12 May 2015, through the label Dead Oceans. The album is the first in his discography to feature a full band playing on almost every track.

== Background ==
The songs of the album were recorded in various countries, studios, and barns, and are said to "carry a weather-worn quality, some dirt and some grit." BJ Burton announced via his Instagram page that production on the album had begun in July 2014 and concluded in September 2014. The album is said to be Matsson's most personal and direct piece of work, inspired by the death of a close family member and by the divorce from his wife, singer-songwriter Amanda Bergman. A trailer for the album was released on February 10, 2015, with Matsson proclaiming that "this is not the end, this is fine".

== Critical reception ==
Professional ratings
Aggregate scores
Source	Rating
Metacritic	75/100
Review scores
Source	Rating
AllMusic	3.5/5 stars
The A.V. Club	B−
Consequence of Sound	B+
Drowned in Sound	8/10
Exclaim!	8/10
The Guardian	4/5 stars
Mojo	3/5 stars
Paste	8.5/10
PopMatters	8/10
Pitchfork	6.7/10
Q	4/5 stars

Dark Bird Is Home received positive reviews from most music critics. At Metacritic, which assigns a normalized rating out of 100 to reviews from mainstream critics, the album received an average score of 75, based on 21 reviews, which indicates "generally favorable reviews".

== Commercial performance ==
The album debuted in the United States at No. 1 on Folk Albums, No. 8 on Top Rock Albums, and No. 67 on Billboard 200, with 8,000 sold in its first week.

== Track listing ==
All tracks are written by Kristian Matsson.

No.	Title	Length
1.	"Fields of Our Home"	4:29
2.	"Darkness of the Dream"	5:02
3.	"Singers"	3:09
4.	"Slow Dance"	3:39
5.	"Little Nowhere Towns"	3:30
6.	"Sagres"	5:15
7.	"Timothy"	4:19
8.	"Beginners"	3:16
9.	"Seventeen"	4:09
10.	"Dark Bird Is Home"	5:05
Total length:		41:53

== Personnel ==
- Kristian Matsson – banjo, bass guitar, clarinet, drums, acoustic guitar, electric guitar, harmonica, alto horn, omnichord, pedal steel guitar, percussion, piano, synthesizer, tape machine, tom-tom drum, vocals, backup vocals
- Oskar Bond – piano
- BJ Burton – engineer, mixing, producer
- C.J. Camerieri – French horn, trumpet
- Bird Coulter – piano
- Dan Huiting – bass guitar
- Mike Lewis – bass guitar, piano, soprano saxophone, saxophone, synthesizer
- Huntley Miller – mastering
- Niclas Nordin – drums, percussion
- Mike Noyce – electric guitar, viola, violin, vocals, backup vocals
- Mats Winkvist – bass guitar
- Cameron Wittig – photography

== Charts ==
Chart (2015)	Peak position
Australian Albums (ARIA)	98
Belgian Albums (Ultratop Flanders)	68
Dutch Albums (Album Top 100)	40
Norwegian Albums (VG-lista)	30
Scottish Albums (Official Charts)	60
Swedish Albums (Sverigetopplistan)	11
Swiss Albums (Schweizer Hitparade)	54
UK Albums (Official Charts)	69
UK Album Downloads (Official Charts)	88
UK Independent Albums (Official Charts)	11
US Americana/Folk Albums (Billboard)	1
US Top Rock Albums (Billboard)	8
US Billboard 200	67
