= The Tallest Man on Earth (EP) =

EP by The Tallest Man on Earth
- Released: December 31, 2006
- Genre: Folk
- Length: 15:46
- Label: Gravitation

The Tallest Man on Earth chronology
The Tallest Man on Earth (EP) (2006)	Shallow Grave (2008)

The Tallest Man on Earth is the self-titled five-song EP from the Swedish folk artist The Tallest Man on Earth. "Into the Stream" was later re-recorded for the album Shallow Grave.

On June 21, 2011, the EP was reissued on Gravitation and distributed by Dead Oceans. The reissue features the previously unreleased track "In the Pockets" and is exclusive to the vinyl version.

== Track listing ==
All tracks are written by Kristian Matsson.

No.	Title	Length
1.	"It Will Follow the Rain"	3:25
2.	"Walk the Line"	3:32
3.	"Steal Tomorrow"	2:40
4.	"Over the Hills"	3:20
5.	"Into the Stream"	2:51
Total length:		15:46

2011 vinyl reissue track listing
No.	Title	Length
1.	"It Will Follow the Rain"	3:25
2.	"Walk the Line"	3:32
3.	"Steal Tomorrow"	2:40
4.	"In the Pockets"	3:48
5.	"Over the Hills"	3:20
6.	"Into the Stream"	2:51
Total length:		19:34
