= Dub Thompson =

American indie rock music duo

- Origin: Agoura Hills, California
- Genres: Indie rock; neo-psychedelia; post-punk; experimental rock
- Years active: 2014–present
- Label: Dead Oceans
- Members: Matt Pulos; Evan Laffer
- Website: dubthompson.com

Dub Thompson is an American indie rock music duo consisting of Matt Pulos and Evan Laffer, originating from Agoura Hills, California. The duo plays a style of post-punk, post-rock, punk rock, alternative rock style experimental rock music. Dub Thompson was established in 2014, while they released a studio album, 9 Songs (2014), with Dead Oceans.

== Background ==
Matt Pulos, vocalist and guitarist, and Evan Laffer, drummer, become friends while attending Agoura High School in Agoura Hills, California. Their band was originally named Wolf Thompson after the Vice Principal of Lindero Canyon Middle School.

Evan Laffer is also the co-host of the Jokermen podcast with his friend - writer, Ian Grant.

== Music history ==
The duo commenced as a musical entity in 2014, with releasing a studio album, 9 Songs, on June 10, 2014, with Dead Oceans. This album got a Metascore of a 70 from seven ratings.

== Members ==
Current members

- Matthew David "Matt" Pulos (born June 24, 1995) – vocals, guitars
- Evan Benjamin Laffer (born November 30, 1994) – drums

== Discography ==
Studio albums

- 9 Songs (June 10, 2014, Dead Oceans)
