= Entertainment, Death =

Studio album by Spirit of the Beehive
- Released: April 9, 2021
- Recorded: April – July 2020
- Genres: Experimental rock; post-rock; psychedelic rock
- Length: 36:41
- Label: Saddle Creek
- Producers: Zack Schwartz; Corey Wichlin

Spirit of the Beehive chronology
Hypnic Jerks (2018)	Entertainment, Death (2021)

Singles from Entertainment, Death
- 1. "There's Nothing You Can't Do" Released: February 3, 2021; 2. "The Server is Immersed" Released: February 24, 2021

Entertainment, Death (stylized in all capitals) is the fourth studio album by American experimental rock band Spirit of the Beehive. The album was released on April 9, 2021 through Saddle Creek Records. Two singles were released ahead of the album, "There's Nothing You Can't Do", and "The Server is Immersed", which were met with critical acclaim. The album itself was met with universal critical acclaim, and appeared in numerous end of the year lists.

== Background and recording ==
Writing for the album began during the onset of the COVID-19 pandemic in April 2020, and lasted until July 2020. Recording occurred concurrently during this process, and mastering occurred during the fall of 2020 in anticipation of a Spring 2021 release.

== Critical reception ==
Professional ratings
Aggregate scores
Source	Rating
AnyDecentMusic?	7.5/10
Metacritic	84/100
Review scores
Source	Rating
AllMusic	3.5/5 stars
Beats Per Minute	84/100
Exclaim!	8/10
Flood Magazine	7/10
No Ripcord	8/10
Our Culture	4/5 stars
Paste	8.2/10
Pitchfork	8.3/10
Riot	9/10

Entertainment, Death received critical acclaim by contemporary music critics. On review aggregator, Metacritic, Entertainment, Death has an average critic review of 82 out of 100, indicating "universal acclaim based on 6 Critic Reviews". Harrison Baer, writing for Beats Per Minute wrote that "the band’s shape-shifting compositions create a forward momentum well suited to a journey through different levels of Hell on Earth." Baer gave the album an 84 out of 100. Sophie Kemp, writing for Pitchfork, gave the album a "Best New Music" designation, and an 8.3 out of 10 rating. Kemp summarized the album as "reclusive, cryptic, late-night paranoia music. Their oblique songs can evoke an entire landscape of feeling in very few words".

Paul Simpson, writing for Allmusic, gave Entertainment, Death three-and-a-half stars out of five, describing the album as difficult for casual listeners, but rewarding for patient listeners. Simpson said that on Entertainment, Death, The Spirit of the Beehive "make willfully unorthodox music and seem to dare listeners to keep up with them and make sense of their art, but those who make the effort are rewarded by the band's unbridled creativity and warped yet radiant sense of optimism and excitement".

Upon the end of the calendar year, the album was listed in at least nine major music publication's "Best of 2021" album lists. Two publications, Beats Per Minute and Paste, placed Entertainment, Death in the top 10 of their respective lists.

=== Accolades ===
Entertainment, Death on year-end lists
Publication	List	Rank	Ref.
Beats Per Minute	Top 50 Albums of 2021	7	
Exclaim!	Exclaim!'s 50 Best Albums of 2021	21	
Fader	The Best Albums of 2021	31	
Gaffa	Top 20 Albums of 2021	17	
Our Culture	The 50 Best Albums of 2021	12	
Paste	The 50 Best Albums of 2021	9	
Pitchfork	The 50 Best Albums of 2021	28	
Pitchfork	The 31 Best Rock Albums of 2021	—	
Spin	The 30 Best Albums of 2021	22	
Stereogum	The 50 Best Albums of 2021	27	

== Track listing ==
All music is composed by Zack Schwartz, Rivka Ravede, and Corey Wichlin. All track titles are stylized in upper case.

No.	Title	Length
1.	"Entertainment"	2:44
2.	"There's Nothing You Can't Do"	2:59
3.	"Wrong Circle"	2:51
4.	"Bad Son"	2:51
5.	"Give Up Your Life"	2:54
6.	"Rapid & Complete Recovery"	4:01
7.	"The Server is Immersed"	2:49
8.	"It Might Take Some Time"	2:38
9.	"Wake Up (In Rotation)"	2:56
10.	"I Suck the Devil's Cock"	6:40
11.	"Death"	3:18
Total length:		36:41
