= Greg Mendez =

American musician

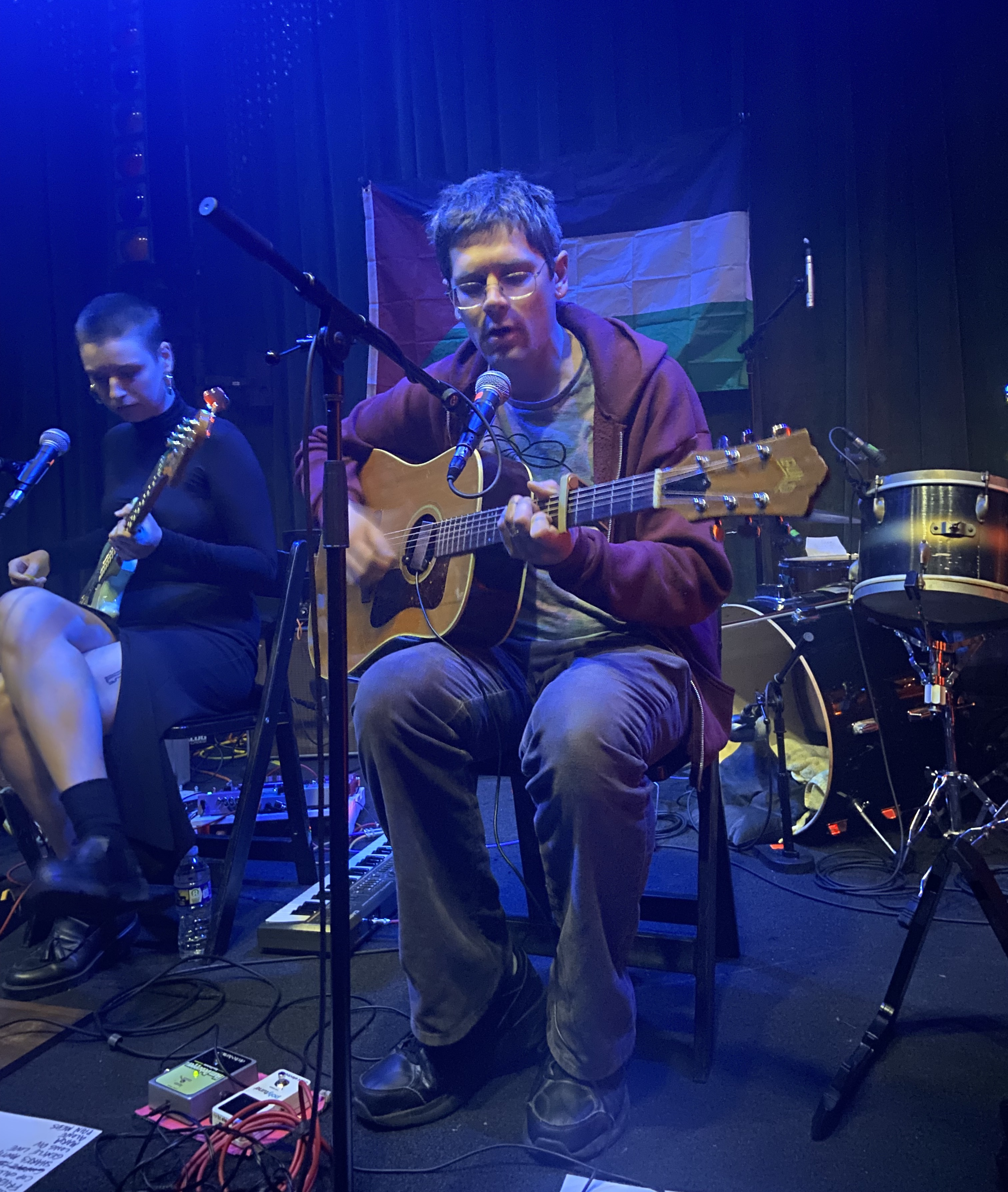
- Greg and Veronica Mendez performing in 2024

Background information
- Origin: Philadelphia, Pennsylvania, United States
- Genres: Lo-fi; Americana; indie folk
- Occupation: Singer-songwriter
- Instruments: Guitar; vocals
- Years active: 2006–present
- Labels: Devil Town Tapes; Forged Artifacts; Dead Oceans

Greg Mendez is an American indie rock musician from Philadelphia, Pennsylvania.

== History ==
Mendez began making music in 2006, but released his first full length album, Phone Records, in 2016. He released an EP, Shrug, in 2017. Mendez released an album in 2018 titled & Gum Trash. In 2023, Mendez released his latest self-titled album. Mendez's self-titled album brought him considerably more attention than prior releases. Upon its release, the album was named one of "10 New Albums You Should Listen To Now" by Pitchfork. In 2024, Mendez released the single "krillin" with They Are Gutting a Body of Water and Sun Organ. He also signed to Dead Oceans and released the EP First Time / Alone.

== Discography ==
- Early Demos (2009)
- Phone Records (2016)
- ¯\_(ツ)_/¯ (2017)
- Sleepy Freak // Greg Mendez Split (2017; with Sleepy Freak)
- & Gum Trash (2018)
- Greg Mendez // Rachel Lightner Split (2018; with Rachel Lightner)
- Home Videos (2006–2018) (2018)
- Heavy Metal High (2019)
- Cherry Hell (2020)
- Live at Purgatory (2022)
- Greg Mendez (2023)
- First Time / Alone (2024)
- Beauty Land (2026)
