= Bill Fay =

English singer, pianist and songwriter (1943–2025)

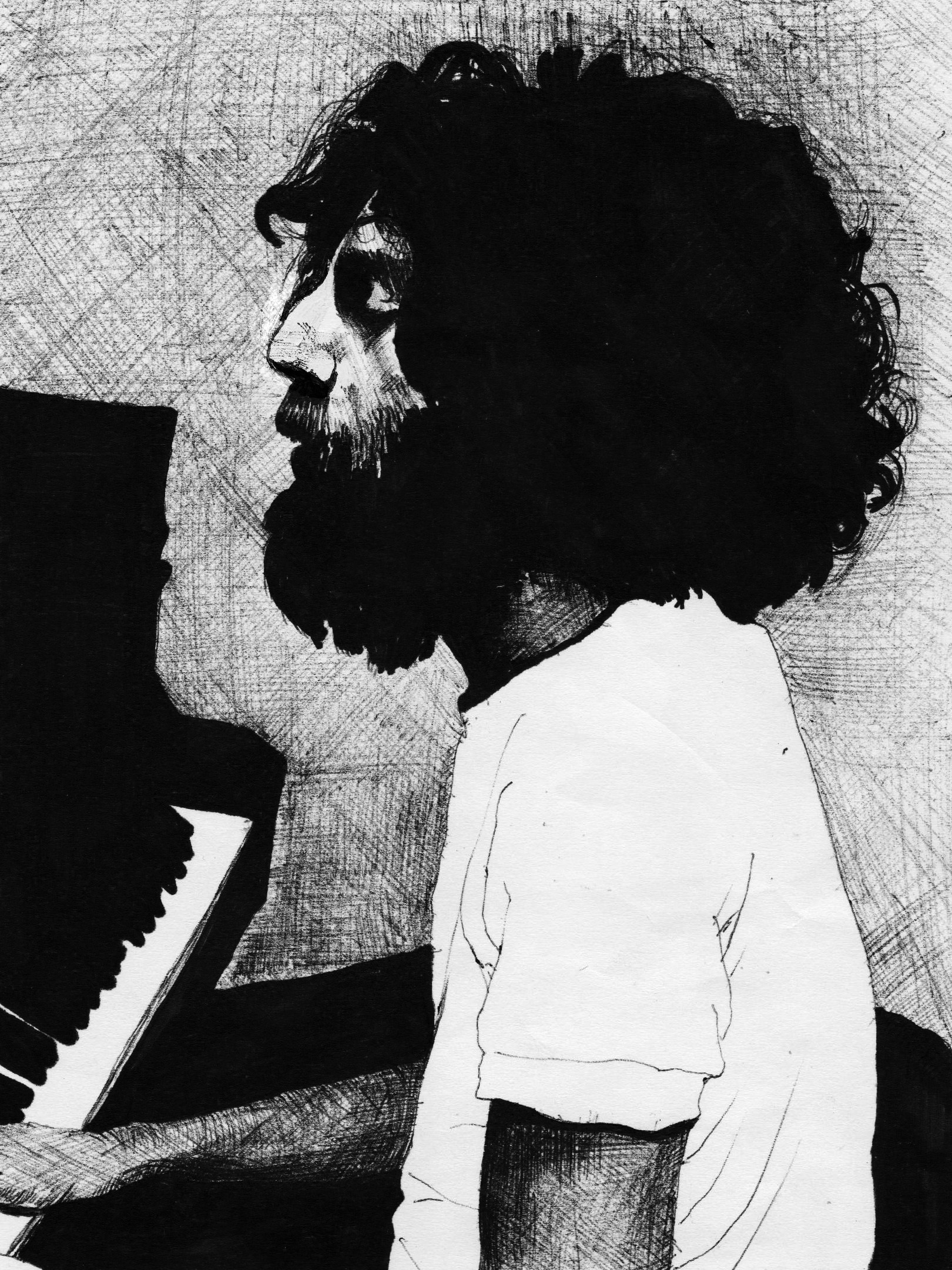
- Pen and ink portrait of Fay

Background information
- Born: William Fay; 9 September 1943; London, England
- Died: 22 February 2025 (aged 81) London, England
- Genres: Folk rock
- Occupation: Singer-songwriter
- Instruments: Vocals; piano
- Years active: 1967–2025
- Labels: Deram; Jnana; Coptic Cat; Dead Oceans

William Fay (9 September 1943 – 22 February 2025) was an English singer-songwriter. His early recordings were released by Deram, but following the release of his second album in 1971, Fay was dropped by the label. His work enjoyed a growing cult status in the 1990s, and his older works were re-issued in 1998 and 2004–2005. Fay's 2012 album Life Is People was his first album of all-new material since 1971. His last album, Countless Branches, was released on 17 January 2020.

== Biography ==
=== Early career ===
Fay was born on 9 September 1943 in north London, where he lived throughout his life. He attended college in Wales, studying electronics, where he first began writing songs on the piano and harmonium.

His first single, "Some Good Advice" / "Screams in the Ears", was issued on the Deram label in 1967, and was followed by two albums, Bill Fay in 1970 and Time of the Last Persecution in 1971. The recordings did not sell well, and Fay was dropped from Deram soon after the release of his second album. They were re-issued in 1998, and then again in 2005.

Despite returning to the recording studio in the late 1970s, Tomorrow, Tomorrow & Tomorrow, the follow-up to Time of the Last Persecution was not released until January 2005, following the reissues of his earlier works.

=== Cult status and comeback ===
Fay's work enjoyed a growing cult status in the 1990s. His first two albums were re-issued in 1998, an event which Bill Fay described in 2012 as follows:

Up until 1998, when some people reissued my albums, as far as I was concerned, I was gone, deleted. No one was listening. But then I got the shock that people remembered my music. I was doing some gardening, and listening to some of my songs on cassette, and a part of me thought they were quite good. I thought, "Maybe somebody will hear them someday." That same evening, 14 years ago, I got a call from a music writer telling me that my two albums were being reissued. A shock is not gonna get much bigger than that, David [...] It was astonishing to me. I won't ever really be able to believe that it happened. That's how I feel about it. I had come to terms with the fact that I was deleted, but that I had always kept writing songs anyway and that was good enough.

In 2004, the British label Wooden Hill released a collection of demos recorded between 1966 and 1970 entitled From the Bottom of an Old Grandfather Clock. Recordings from 1978-1981 were finally released in January 2005. Entitled Tomorrow, Tomorrow & Tomorrow, the album was credited to the Bill Fay Group, and released on the Durtro Jnana label.

The compilation album Still Some Light appeared on the Coptic Cat label in 2010, a double CD containing a mix of older material and newer, home-recorded songs.

Released on 21 August 2012 on Dead Oceans, Life is People was his first new studio LP in over 40 years.

Who Is the Sender?, a new album by Bill Fay, was released in April 2015. The second album track, "War Machine", came out as a single in February 2015.

A feature article entitled "Bill Fay Was a Hidden Gem. One Musician Made Finding Him a Mission" was published in the New York Times on 15 January 2020.

His last album, Countless Branches, was released on 17 January 2020.

Fay died from complications of Parkinson's disease in London, on 22 February 2025, at the age of 81.

== Covers and appreciation ==
The American band Wilco has played Fay's song "Be Not So Fearful" in live performances and the band's singer, Jeff Tweedy, can be heard singing it in the documentary I Am Trying to Break Your Heart: A Film About Wilco. Fay joined the band and Tweedy onstage for the rendition of the song at shows at the Shepherd's Bush Empire in 2007, and at the Union Chapel, Islington in 2010 respectively, both in London.

The English singer-songwriter and pianist John Howard recorded a cover version of the song "Be Not So Fearful" for his E.P. Songs for the Lost and Found (2008). The song "Be Not So Fearful" was also covered by Ed Harcourt on the benefit compilation album Songs to Save a Life - In Aid of Samaritans (2011).

A cover version of Fay's "Pictures of Adolf Again", by producer and musician Jim O'Rourke and Wilco drummer Glenn Kotche, can be heard in the film from Kōji Wakamatsu, United Red Army. The title track of "Time of the Last Persecution" became a live standard of the British Apocalyptic folk group, Current 93.

The band Okkervil River covered Fay's song "Plan D" on their Golden Opportunities 2 EP in 2011.

The American band The War on Drugs covered Fay's song "I Hear You Calling" at shows throughout 2014.

His song "Be Not So Fearful" was covered by A.C. Newman in 2014, and was used in the episode "Us" of The Walking Dead.

In 2008 the English singer Marc Almond recorded a live version of "Cosmic Boxer" and it was released on his album In 'Bluegate Fields': Live at Wilton's Music Hall.

In a widely available live bootleg recording of a show at The Great American Music Hall in San Francisco in February 2009, Stephen Malkmus of the band Pavement, covered Fay's "We Have Laid Here".

== Discography ==
=== Albums ===
- Bill Fay (Deram, 1970)
- Time of the Last Persecution (Deram, 1971)
- Tomorrow, Tomorrow & Tomorrow (recorded 1978–1981; Durtro, 2005; Dead Oceans, 2024 28-track re-release)
- Life Is People (Dead Oceans, 2012)
- Who Is the Sender? (Dead Oceans, 2015)
- Countless Branches (Dead Oceans, 2020)

=== Compilation albums ===
- From the Bottom of an Old Grandfather Clock (recorded 1966–1970; Wooden Hill, 2004)
- Still Some Light (2CD, recorded 1970, 1971, 2009; Coptic Cat, 2010) / new edition: Still Some Light Pt. 1 (1CD / 2LP) & Still Some Light Pt. 2 (1CD / 2LP) (Dead Oceans, 14 January 2022) (compilation of early 1970–1971 studio recordings and 2009 new material home recordings) (Note: The first CD consists of studio recordings sourced from archival 7½" tapes and cassette from 1970 and 1971. The 1970 tracks are prior to the recording of Time of the Last Persecution, and contain alternative versions of songs on that album, two tracks from Bill's first album Bill Fay as well as previously unreleased songs. There are also previously unreleased songs from 1971. The second CD is a home-recorded studio album from 2009.)
