= Lotto (album) =

Studio album by They Are Gutting a Body of Water
- Released: October 17, 2025
- Length: 27:44
- Labels: ATO; Julia's War; Smoking Room
- Producer: They Are Gutting a Body of Water

They Are Gutting a Body of Water chronology
Lucky Styles (2022)	Lotto (2025)

Singles from Lotto
- 1. "American Food" Released: May 21, 2025; 2. "Trainers" Released: July 15, 2025; 3. "The Chase" Released: August 19, 2025; 4. "RL Stine" Released: September 16, 2025

Lotto is the fourth studio album by the American shoegaze band They Are Gutting a Body of Water, released on October 17, 2025, by ATO Records, Julia's War and Smoking Room.

== Critical reception ==
Professional ratings
Aggregate scores
Source	Rating
AnyDecentMusic?	7.6/10
Metacritic	79/100
Review scores
Source	Rating
AllMusic	3.5/5 stars
Beats Per Minute	82%
Clash	8/10
Louder Than War	4/5 stars
New Noise Magazine	3.5/5 stars
Pitchfork	7.4/10
Rolling Stone	4/5 stars
The Skinny	3/5 stars
Stereoboard	4/5 stars

According to the review aggregator Metacritic, Lotto received "generally favorable reviews" based on a weighted average score of 79 out of 100 from 8 critic scores.

Writing for AllMusic, Paul Simpson called it their "attempt to create a raw, live-to-tape album rather than something engineered and assembled on a computer", noting that "While LOTTO does generally feel like more of a direct rock record than other TAGABOW releases, there's still some experimentation and incorporation of different genres", concluding "LOTTO is disorienting and messy, but there's undoubtedly something real and honest about it." In a Pitchfork review, Sue Park opined it was "the band's most hopeful work, in both its brutal honesty and its conscious pursuit of staying grounded", commenting that the band "expose the tenderness at their music's core: a refusal to anesthetize, an avowal to meet the bone where it breaks." Rob Sheffield said in a Rolling Stone review that it was "their most intensely emotional noise yet, a showdown with addiction and disease and death. It’s an exorcism of an album — heavier than heaven, hotter than hell, bold as love", concluding by noting that "it's a moment where fierce industrial brutality creates raw human emotion".

== Track listing ==
No.	Title	Length
1.	"The Chase"	3:25
2.	"Sour Diesel"	3:51
3.	"Trainers"	2:50
4.	"Chrises Head"	1:06
5.	"RL Stine"	2:30
6.	"Slo Crostic" (Fugazi cover)	2:19
7.	"Violence III"	2:05
8.	"American Food"	3:11
9.	"Baeside K"	2:50
10.	"Herpim"	3:43
Total length:		27:44

Notes

- All tracks are stylized in all lowercase.

== Credits and personnel ==
Credits are adapted from Tidal:

Musicians

- Douglas Dulgarian – vocals, guitar
- P.J. Carroll – lead guitar
- Emily Lofing – bass (except tracks 4, 8)
- Benjamin Opatut – drums (except tracks 4, 8)

Production

- Dan Angel – recording engineer (except tracks 4, 8), mixing
- Douglas Dulgarian – recording engineer (tracks 4, 8), mixing
- Scoops Dardaris – recording engineer (vocals)
- Ruairi O'Flaherty – mastering
- Brian Karlsson – album cover
- TJ Strohmer – back photos
- Sloane McCarthy – back photos
- Samuelito Cruz – layout
