= Sun Airway =

- Origin: Philadelphia, Pennsylvania
- Genres: alternative dance; indietronica; dream pop; alternative rock; indie rock; indie pop; pop rock
- Years active: 2009–Present
- Labels: Dead Oceans
- Spinoff of: The A-Sides
- Members: Jon Barthmus; Patrick Marsceill
- Website: facebook.com/sunairway

Sun Airway is an American music duo consisting of Jon Barthmus and Patrick Marsceill, formerly of The A-Sides. The duo plays a style of alternative dance, indietronica, dream pop, alternative rock, indie pop, indie rock, and pop rock music. Sun Airway was established in Philadelphia, Pennsylvania in 2009, while they disbanded in 2013. The duo released two studio albums, Nocturne of Exploded Crystal Chandelier (2010) and Soft Fall (2012), both with Dead Oceans. In 2017, they self-released their third album, Heraldic Black Cherry.

== Background ==
They formed after the disbandment of The A-Sides in 2009, where they originated from Philadelphia, Pennsylvania, being Jon Barthmus and his drummer Patrick Marsceill. There was a brief hiatus in 2013 with speculation that the band had disbanded once again, after only seeing a few posts on their Facebook page between 2012 and 2016. Speculation was put to rest with the announcement of their third album.

== Music history ==
The band commenced as a musical entity in 2009, with releasing a studio album, Nocturne of Exploded Crystal Chandelier, on October 25, 2010, with Dead Oceans. Their subsequent studio album, Soft Fall, was released on October 2, 2012, as the final release from the duo by Dead Oceans. In December 2016, Sun Airway released a single called FOAM, with an announcement of a new album, on their Facebook Page.

== Members ==
- Jonathan Ernest "Jon" Barthmus (born October 3, 1980) – lead vocals
- Patrick Marsceill (born May 16, 1983) – drums

== Discography ==
Studio albums

- Nocturne of Exploded Crystal Chandelier (October 25, 2010, Dead Oceans)
- Soft Fall (October 2, 2012, Dead Oceans)
- Heraldic Black Cherry (2017)
- Citrus Quarters (2022)
