= There's No Leaving Now =

Studio album by The Tallest Man on Earth
- Released: 11 June 2012
- Genre: Folk
- Length: 38:57
- Language: English
- Label: Dead Oceans
- Producer: Kristian Matsson

The Tallest Man on Earth chronology
| The Wild Hunt (2010) | There's No Leaving Now (2012) | Dark Bird Is Home (2015) |

Singles from There's No Leaving Now
- 1. "1904" Released: 15 May 2012

Professional ratings
Aggregate scores
| Source | Rating |
|---|---|
| Metacritic | 74/100 |
Review scores
| Source | Rating |
| Allmusic | 3.5/5 stars |
| The A.V. Club | B |
| Clash | 8/10 |
| Consequence of Sound | C− |
| Crackle Feedback | 6/10 |
| musicOMH | 5/5 stars |
| Paste | 6.4/10 |
| Pitchfork Media | 7.1/10 |
| Spin | 8/10 |
| Tiny Mix Tapes | 2/5 marks |
| Under the Radar | 7.5/10 stars |

There's No Leaving Now is the third studio album by Swedish folk artist The Tallest Man on Earth, released on 11 June 2012 on Dead Oceans. The album was preceded by the single "1904", released as a digital download on 15 May 2012. The track was also made available as a free download on Rolling Stone's official website.

== Background ==
The album was recorded during a five-month-long session in Kristian Matsson's home, where he lived with his then wife Amanda Hollingby Matsson. The release of the album was announced in March 2012, together with the record's track list and artwork. During an interview released to American magazine Rolling Stone, Matsson explained the sound of There's No Leaving Now:

"I wanted to build something that didn't sound like a rock band, but wasn't super minimalistic. I wanted a sound that had that brittle [quality], that feeling that it might just fall apart."

Lyrically, the album is focused on the willingness to confront and deal with your own weaknesses, as opposed to the theme of running away, which was recurring on his previous works.

== Commercial performance ==
The album debuted in the United States at No. 14 on Top Rock Albums, No. 2 on Folk Albums, and No. 35 on Billboard 200, with 12,000 sold in its first week. The album has sold 58,000 copies in the US as of May 2015.

== Track listing ==
All tracks are written by Kristian Matsson.

| No. | Title | Length |
|---|---|---|
| 1. | "To Just Grow Away" | 3:17 |
| 2. | "Revelation Blues" | 3:43 |
| 3. | "Leading Me Now" | 3:24 |
| 4. | "1904" | 3:59 |
| 5. | "Bright Lanterns" | 3:41 |
| 6. | "There's No Leaving Now" | 4:29 |
| 7. | "Wind and Walls" | 4:09 |
| 8. | "Little Brother" | 3:56 |
| 9. | "Criminals" | 3:29 |
| 10. | "On Every Page" | 4:50 |
| Total length: | | 38:57 |

== Personnel ==
Musicians

- Kristian Matsson - vocals, guitars, piano, various instruments
- Mats Winkvist - bass (1, 2, 4, 6 and 7)
- Niclas Nordin - drums (2 and 4)

Recording personnel

- Kristian Matsson - producer, recording, mixing
- Jakob Grundtman - mixing
- Joe Laporta - mastering

Artwork

- Amanda Matsson - picture
- Daniel Murphy - sleeve

== Charts ==
| Chart (2012) | Peak position |
|---|---|
| Belgian Albums Chart (Flanders) | 74 |
| Canadian Albums Chart | 37 |
| Dutch Albums Chart | 40 |
| Swedish Albums Chart | 14 |
| UK Independent Albums Chart | 13 |
| UK Indie Breakers Albums Chart | 1 |
| US Billboard 200 | 35 |
| US Rock Albums | 14 |
| US Independent Albums | 6 |
| US Folk Albums | 2 |

== Release history ==
| Region | Release date | Format | Label |
|---|---|---|---|
| Italy | 11 June 2012 | Download | Dead Oceans |
| United Kingdom | 11 June 2012 | CD, download | Dead Oceans |
| United States | 12 June 2012 | CD, download | Dead Oceans |
| Sweden | 13 June 2012 | CD, download | Gravitation, Border |
| Italy | 26 June 2012 | LP, CD | Dead Oceans |

== See also ==
- List of UK Indie Breakers Chart number-one albums of the 2010s
