= The Tallest Man on Earth =

Swedish singer-songwriter (born 1983)

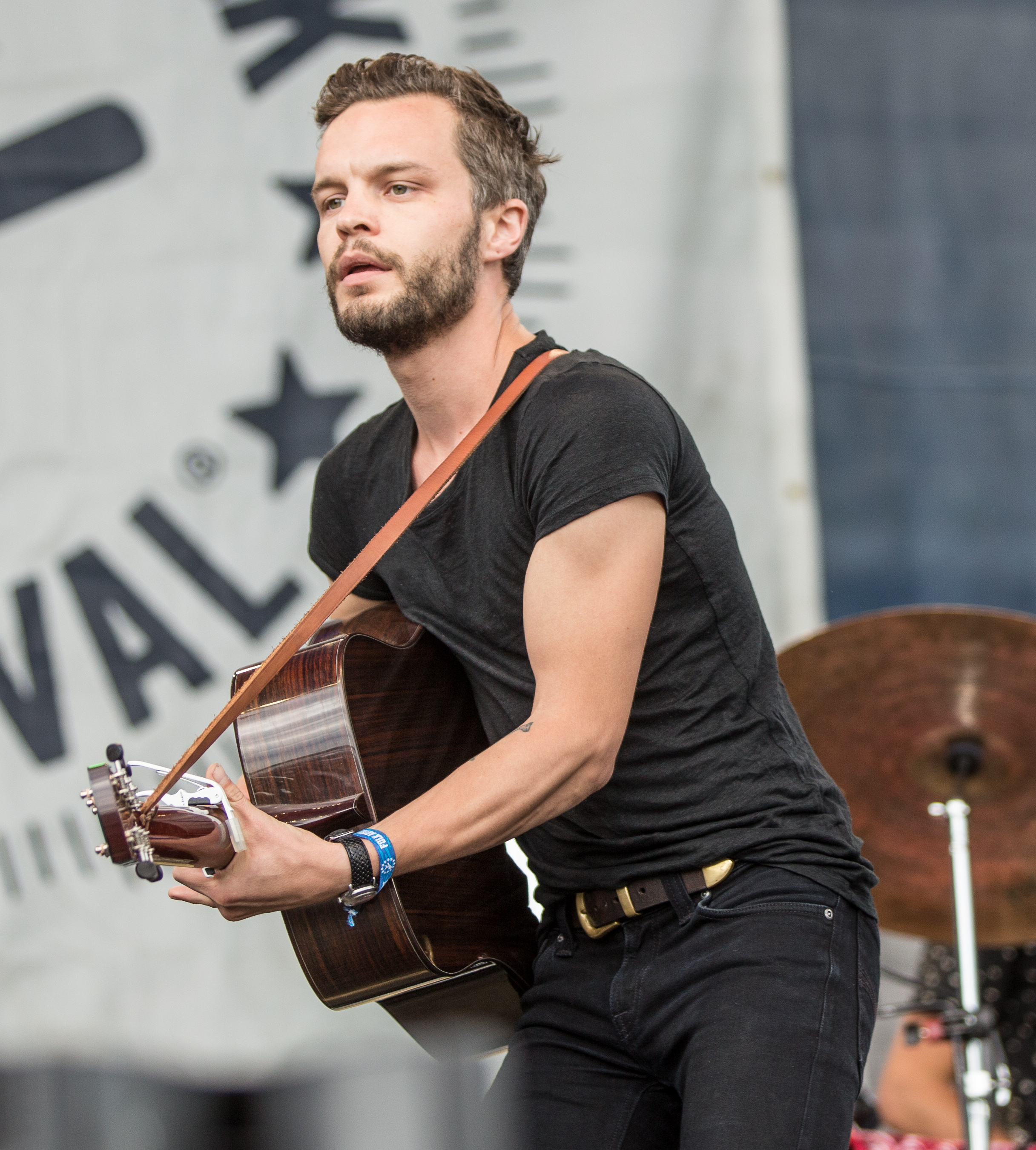
- Matsson performing at the Newport Folk Festival in July 2015

Background information
- Born: Kristian Matsson; 30 April 1983 (age 43); Leksand, Dalarna, Sweden
- Genres: Folk; indie folk
- Instruments: Vocals; guitar; banjo; piano
- Years active: 2005–present
- Labels: Gravitation; Dead Oceans; Mexican Summer; ANTI-
- Website: thetallestmanonearth.com
- Height: 5 ft 7 in (170 cm)

Kristian Matsson (born 30 April 1983) is a Swedish singer-songwriter who performs under the stage name The Tallest Man on Earth. Matsson grew up in Leksand, and began his solo career in 2006, having previously been the lead singer of the indie band Montezumas. His music has often drawn comparisons to the music of Bob Dylan.

Since 2006, Matsson has released seven full-length albums and four EPs. He records and produces these in his home, and usually records his voice and guitar together on one track. He is known for his charismatic stage presence.

He was previously married to Amanda Bergman, also known by the stage name Idiot Wind. Together, they wrote the music for the Swedish drama film Once a Year.

== Career ==
Before Matsson began his solo career, he was the lead singer of the indie band Montezumas.

His first solo release, The Tallest Man on Earth, was released in 2006. The EP received positive reviews.

At the start of his solo career, Matsson did not plan to make music full-time, and he released his music without providing personal information or photographs of himself to journalists.

To celebrate the 10-year anniversary of The Wild Hunt, Matsson released a cover of "Graceland" by Paul Simon through Dead Oceans.

=== Shallow Grave (2008–2009) ===
In 2008, Matsson released an album, Shallow Grave, which was praised by the music site Pitchfork and was listed No. 47 on Pitchfork's list of the 50 Best Albums of 2008. The album received generally favorable reviews. Following Shallow Grave's release, Matsson was chosen as the opening act for the American indie folk band Bon Iver. The resulting publicity led to a solo tour throughout the United States, Australia and Europe, where he attracted large crowds, in spite of the lack of a record deal or distribution in the United States.

The song "Pistol Dreams", also released as a single, appeared in the Swedish television serial How Soon Is Now? (Swedish: Upp till kamp).

On 9 October 2009, Matsson visited the Daytrotter studio, where he recorded four songs, including a cover of Bob Dylan's "I Want You." At that time, Matsson cited Roscoe Holcomb as an influence for his singing style and later included Emmylou Harris, Feist and Cat Power as influences.

=== The Wild Hunt (2010–2012) ===
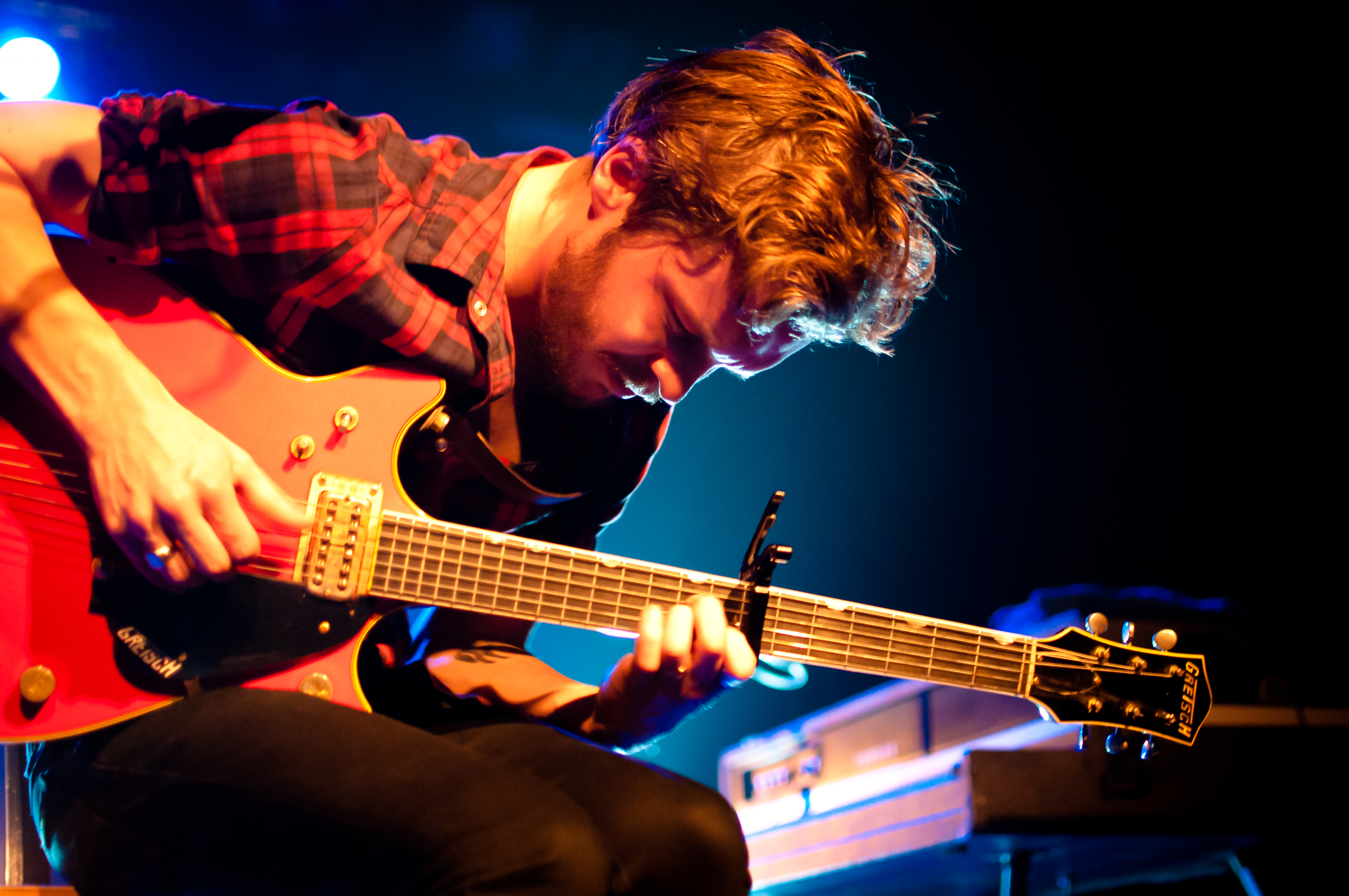
Matsson performing as The Tallest Man on Earth on 17 November 2010

Mattson signed with the American label Dead Oceans; in April 2010, he released his second album, The Wild Hunt. The album was well received. The single "King of Spain" contains, besides the title track, a cover of Paul Simon's "Graceland" and the previously unreleased track "Where I Thought I Met the Angels"; it was sold exclusively at the subsequent European tour. During the late summer and autumn of 2010 Matsson went on tour in North America and Europe.

The album was followed that same year by an EP, Sometimes the Blues Is Just a Passing Bird, which also got good reviews. The EP was released through the iTunes Store in September, and in November was published on CD, LP and MP3. The album consists of five songs, all written for The Wild Hunt; "Like the Wheel" the conclusion of many of Matsson's gigs, and "The Dreamer", was the first recording on which he plays electric guitar.

The Wild Hunt garnered Matsson several award nominations. In 2011, he was nominated in the category "Best Male Artist" in the Grammis Awards, the Swedish equivalent of the American Grammy Awards, but lost to Håkan Hellström. Matsson was also nominated in the category "pop" in the 2011 P3 Gold Awards, but lost to Malmö indie pop band This Is Head. In February 2011, Matsson won the Manifest Award in the "singer/songwriter" category; he was also nominated in the "live" category, lost to Robyn.

On 5 April 2011, Matsson participated in the BBC's program, Later... with Jools Holland, where he performed the songs "King of Spain" and "Love Is All". In June of the same year, Matsson's debut EP, The Tallest Man on Earth, was reissued with the previously unreleased track "In the Pockets" exclusive to the vinyl edition of the reissue. In July, he released the single "Weather of a Killing Kind" as part of the 2011 Adult Swim Singles program.

In August 2011, Matsson had contributed to the soundtrack of the Swedish drama film En gång om året (English: Once a Year), along with the Idiot Wind. The film premiered at the Gothenburg Film Festival on 29 January 2012 and had a theatrical release on 17 May 2013.

On 27 January 2012, Matsson took part in the Swedish TV game show, På spåret where he, backed by a studio band, performed two cover songs: Thin Lizzy's "Dancing in the Moonlight" and Cornelis Vreeswijk's "En Fattig Trubadur" (English: A Poor Troubadour). In February of that year, he re-released "King of Spain" as 12" vinyl for the event Record Store Day. the album was limited to 2000 copies.

=== There's No Leaving Now (2012–2013) ===
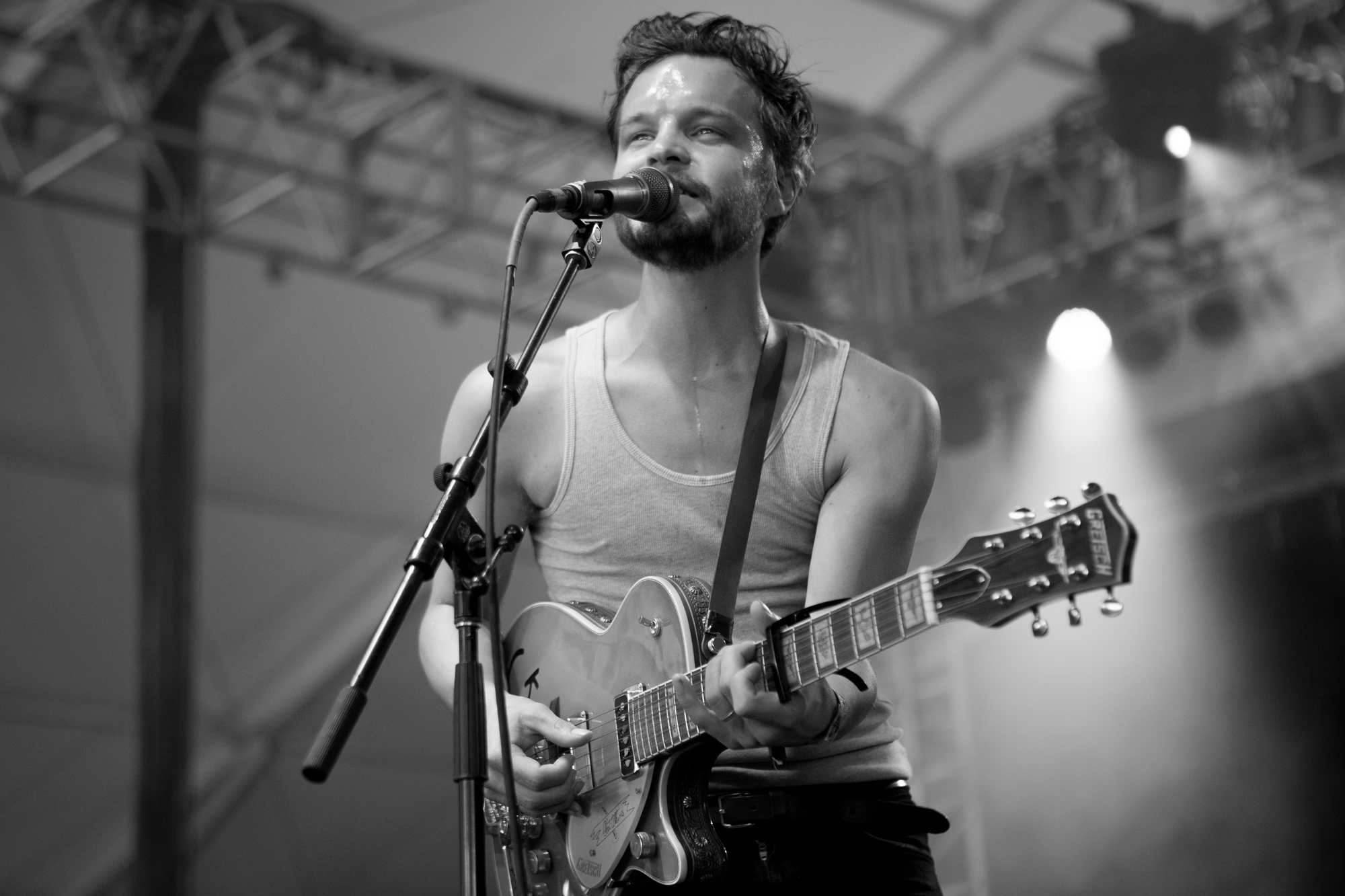
Mattsson performing as The Tallest Man on Earth at Bonnaroo 2013

On 12 June 2012 (June 11 in the UK), Matsson released his third studio album as The Tallest Man on Earth, There's No Leaving Now, on Dead Oceans. The album was recorded by Matsson himself in his home studio in Dalarna during the latter part of 2011 and early 2012. The album was streamed on Dead Oceans' website a week before its official release.

At the same time, Matsson released 1904 b/w Cycles, a 7" LP of his song "1904" as well his cover of the song "Cycles," written by Gayle Caldwell and made famous by Frank Sinatra. He has also covered this song in live performances.

Along with the album, Matsson announced a summer tour throughout Europe and the United States including two gigs in Sweden (at the Södra Teatern (English: Southern Theatre) in Stockholm) and a performance at the Newport Folk Festival in Newport, Rhode Island. Matsson also toured in Europe in October 2012.

On 28 January 2013, Matsson took part in a benefit concert for the American musician Jason Molina, who did not have health insurance and, consequently, was in debt after a hospital stay. The concert took place at the Södra Teatern (English: Southern Theatre) in Stockholm, where Matsson played alongside, among others, I'm Kingfisher and Idiot Wind. Molina died on 16 March 2013.

=== Dark Bird Is Home (2015) ===
Matsson's fourth studio album as The Tallest Man on Earth, Dark Bird Is Home, was released on 12 May 2015 on Dead Oceans. The album was largely inspired by Matsson's divorce from Amanda Bergman as well as the death of a close family member, and its more elaborate instrumentation represented a musical shift from previous albums.

Following its release, Matsson performed—with a full band—at several festivals, including the Roskilde Festival in 2015 and the Edmonton Folk Music Festival in 2016.

=== I Love You. It's a Fever Dream. (2019) ===
On 4 February 2019, Matsson revealed that a new album would be released in 2019. In late February 2019, he revealed that his new album, now titled I Love You. It's a Fever Dream., would be released sometime in April. He also released the first single, "The Running Styles of New York" the same day. The second single, "I'm a Stranger Now" was released on 27 March. The album was released on April 19 2019.

Matsson's song It Will Follow the Rain from his eponymous EP was featured in a 2019 commercial for the Infiniti QX50 automobile.

=== Too Late for Edelweiss (2022) ===
On 19 September 2022, Matsson announced a new album of covers. It was released later that week on 23 September 2022 and includes covers of songs from The National and Bon Iver, among others. The album's title, Too Late for Edelweiss, is a reference to the album För sent för Edelweiss by Swedish singer Håkan Hellström, the title track of which is the first song covered on the album.

=== Henry St. (2023) ===
On 1 February 2023, Matsson revealed that a new album titled Henry St. would be released on 14 April 2023. Henry St. is the first of Mattson's albums recorded in a band setting. The announcement of the album was followed by the release of the single "Every Little Heart". On 19 April, five days after the album's release, Pitchfork gave the album a 6.0, praising the instrumentals and full-band sound but saying that the writing was "just bad". Writing for No Depression, John Amen concluded that "While Matsson’s latest set occasionally loses traction, it certainly includes its memorable moments, most of which reiterate the confessional pitch and rougher vocal stylings of his earlier work."

== Musical style ==
Critics have compared The Tallest Man on Earth to Bob Dylan both in terms of songwriting ability and vocal style. When asked about his lyrical style, Matsson explains that he began listening to Bob Dylan at fifteen, and upon hearing Dylan's cover material, he "tried to figure out where those songs came from" and became slowly exposed to early American folk, such as Pete Seeger and Woody Guthrie. But he is careful to qualify this, saying "I don't consider my work to be a part of any tradition. This is how I play. This is how I write songs."

With regard to his guitar technique, Matsson uses a variety of open tunings, and standard tuning to a lesser degree. He had classical guitar training in his youth, but says he "never really focused on it" and that by the end of high school he "got bored playing guitar because it was like math", until he then discovered open tunings while listening to Nick Drake in his early twenties. He was drawn to this style of playing because it allowed him to focus on singing while still performing intricate music.

== Discography ==
=== Studio albums ===
List of albums, with selected chart positions, sales, and certifications
Title	Details	Peak chart positions						
Title	Details	SWE	BEL (FL)	CAN	FRA	NL	US	UK
Shallow Grave	Released: 5 March 2008; Label: Gravitation, Mexican Summer; Formats: CD, LP, download	—	—	—	—	—	—	—
The Wild Hunt	Released: 13 April 2010; Label: Dead Oceans, Gravitation; Formats: CD, LP, download	38	—	—	—	82	176	157
There's No Leaving Now	Released : 11 June 2012; Label: Dead Oceans, Gravitation; Formats: CD, LP, download	14	74	37	110	40	35	—
Dark Bird Is Home	Released: 12 May 2015; Label: Dead Oceans, Gravitation; Formats: CD, LP, download	11	68	—	—	40	67	69
I Love You. It's a Fever Dream.	Released: 19 April 2019; Label: Dead Oceans, Gravitation; Formats: CD, LP, download	52	—	—	—	—	—	—
Too Late for Edelweiss	Released: 23 September 2022; Label: Anti-; Formats: Download	—	—	—	—	—	—	—
Henry St.	Released: 14 April 2023; Label: Anti-; Formats: Download	57	—	—	—	—	—	—
Just Beyond Endless Mountain	Released: 9 October 2026; Label: Anti-; Formats: LP, download							

=== EPs ===
- The Tallest Man on Earth (2006)
- Sometimes the Blues Is Just a Passing Bird (2010)
- A Collaborative EP with yMusic (2017)
- When the Bird Sees the Solid Ground (2018)

=== Singles ===
Year	Title	Album
2008	"The Gardener"	Shallow Grave
2008	"Pistol Dreams"	Shallow Grave
2010	"The Wild Hunt"	The Wild Hunt
2010	"The King of Spain"	The Wild Hunt
2010	"The Dreamer"	Sometimes the Blues Is Just a Passing Bird
2011	"Weather of a Killing Kind"	Adult Swim Singles Program
2012	"1904"	There's No Leaving Now
2015	"Sagres"	Dark Bird Is Home
2015	"Dark Bird Is Home"	Dark Bird Is Home
2016	"Time of the Blue"	Non-album singles
2016	"Rivers"	Non-album singles
2018	"An Ocean"	When the Bird Sees the Solid Ground
2018	"Somewhere in the Mountains, Somewhere in New York"	When the Bird Sees the Solid Ground
2018	"Forever is a Very Long Time"	When the Bird Sees the Solid Ground
2018	"Down in My Heart"	When the Bird Sees the Solid Ground
2018	"Then I Won't Sing No More"	When the Bird Sees the Solid Ground
2019	"The Running Styles of New York"	I Love You. It's a Fever Dream
2019	"I'm a Stranger Now"	I Love You. It's a Fever Dream
2022	"För Sent för Edelweiss"	Too Late for Edelweiss
2022	"Metal Firecracker"	Too Late for Edelweiss
2022	"Tears Are in Your Eyes"	Too Late for Edelweiss
2022	"Lost Highway"	Too Late for Edelweiss
2023	"Every Little Heart"	Henry St.
2023	"Henry St."	Henry St.

=== Music videos ===
Year	Video	Director
2007	"It Will Follow the Rain"	Johannes Nyholm
2010	"Love Is All"	Johan Stolpe
2015	"Darkness of the Dream"	Jakob Wallin
2023	"Every Little Heart"	Jeroen Dankers
2023	"Henry St."	Jeroen Dankers
