= Glocca Morra (band) =

American emo band

- Origin: Miami, Florida, U.S.
- Genres: Midwest emo; pop punk
- Years active: 2007–2015
- Labels: Count Your Lucky Stars; Lauren; Ranch; Ice Age; Livid
- Spinoffs: Spirit of the Beehive
- Past members: Zack Schwartz; Arik Dayan; Nate Dionne; Jean-Paul Casanova; Ruben Gallego
- Website: gloccamorradied.bandcamp.com

Glocca Morra was an American Midwest emo band from Miami, Florida who relocated to Philadelphia, Pennsylvania early in their career. Along with other bands from the Philadelphia area, they spearheaded the emo revival movement during the late 2000s and early 2010s.

== History ==
Glocca Morra was formed in 2009 in Miami-Dade County, Florida by Zack Schwartz and JP Casanova, who attended high school together and played in the band Set Fire To Failure. The band released their first full-length album, The Working Bones, A Health Decline on Livid Records with Arik Dayan on drums and Ruben Gallego on second guitar and synthesizers. According to Schwartz, he and JP met Dayan because he was their substitute teacher once in high school. Before leaving Miami to move to Philadelphia in 2009, the band recorded two EPs, one titled Fucking Miami, and another titled Museum Mouth. In 2010, Glocca Morra released a split with The Greek Favourites on Make-Out Party Records called Songs in the Key of Ayyyyyy.

In 2010, the band began recording their second full-length album, Just Married, which was released in 2012. Its song "Irrevocable, Motherfucker" ranked 64 in "The 100 Greatest Emo Songs of All Time" list by Vulture.

In October 2011, Glocca Morra released an EP titled Ghoul Intentions with guitar player Nate Dionne of Snowing, who later joined the band full-time. In April 2012, Glocca Morra signed to Kind of Like Records and released an EP, An Obscure Moon Lighting An Obscure World. In 2013, Glocca Morra released a split with Summer Vacation. The band announced in March 2015 plans to release a final two song EP on Ice Age Records before breaking up. The EP songs finally released were "Wussy Pillow" and "Secret Drinker".

In January 2021, Zack Schwartz responded to a question on Spirit of the Beehive's Instagram story asking if there were any plans for a Glocca Morra reunion. Schwartz responded that the band was "never getting back together".

== Band members ==
- Zack Schwartz – vocals, guitar, keyboards (2007–2015)
- Ruben Gallego – guitar (2007–2011)
- JP Casanova – bass (2007–2015)
- Arik Dayan – drums (2007–2015)
- Nate Dionne – guitar (2011–2015)

== Discography ==
Studio albums

- The Working Bones, A Health Decline (2009)
- Just Married (2012)

EPs

- The Greek Favourites/Glocca Morra Split (2010)
- Ghoul Intentions (2011)
- An Obscure Moon Lighting An Obscure World (2012)
- Glocca Morra/Summer Vacation Split (2013)
- Wussy Pillow b/w Secret Drinker (2015)
