= Sword II =

American rock band

- Origin: Atlanta
- Genres: Rock
- Years active: 2018–present
- Members: Travis Arnold; Mari González; Certain Zuko
- Past members: José Izaguirre
- Website: swordii.com

Sword II is an American rock band composed of Mari González, Certain Zuko, and Travis Arnold. They are based in Atlanta, Georgia.

== Members ==
=== Current members ===
- Travis Arnold – (guitar, vocals, bass guitar)
- Mari González – (bass guitar, vocals, guitar)
- Certain Zuko – (guitar, vocals)

=== Former members ===
- José Izaguirre – (drums, vocals)

== Discography ==
=== Albums ===
- Spirit World Tour (2023)
- Electric Hour (2025)

=== EPs ===
- Between II Gardens (2020)

=== Singles ===
- "ana orint" with They Are Gutting a Body of Water (2024)
