= My Anti-Aircraft Friend =

Studio album by Julie
- Released: September 13, 2024
- Recorded: December 2022 – 2024
- Studios: EastWest; Panoramic House; Secret Hand; Palomino Sound; Octopus Beak
- Genres: Shoegaze; grunge; indie rock; alternative rock; nu gaze
- Length: 39:16
- Label: Atlantic
- Producers: Julie; Sonny DiPerri

Julie chronology
Pushing Daisies (2021)	My Anti-Aircraft Friend (2024)

Singles from My Anti-Aircraft Friend
- 1. "Catalogue" Released: September 29, 2023; 2. "Clairbourne Practice" Released: July 10, 2024; 3. "Very Little Effort" Released: August 21, 2024

My Anti-Aircraft Friend (stylized in all lowercase) is the debut studio album by the American rock band Julie, released on September 13, 2024, by Atlantic Records. Recorded with producer Sonny DiPerri in between the band's tours at various recording studios across California, it is a shoegaze, grunge, indie rock, alternative rock and nu gaze album whose songs feature distorted soundscapes, dynamic arrangements alternating in speed and intensity, and vocal interplay. Its lyrics explore unhealthy relationships, mental health, identity, anxiety, insecurities, uncertainty, and "existential angst".

My Anti-Aircraft Friend was well-received by critics, who praised Julie's songwriting and performances. The album was supported by three singles, "Catalogue", "Clairbourne Practice", and "Very Little Effort". Julie embarked on headlining tours of North America, Australia and Europe and performed at various festivals in 2024 and 2025.

== Background and recording ==
Julie was formed in 2019 in Orange Country, California, by guitarist and vocalist Keyan Pourzand, bassist and vocalist Alexandria Elizabeth, and drummer Dillon Lee. In April 2020, the band self-released their debut single "Flutter", which became an unexpected viral success and garnered more than 30 million streams on Spotify by 2024. Around the time of its release, the members of Julie relocated to Los Angeles, where Elizabeth and Pourzand attended the Southern California Institute of Architecture (SCI-Arc). After releasing their debut extended play (EP) Pushing Daisies in August 2021, the band signed with Atlantic Records and released their major label debut single "Pg.4 A Picture of Three Hedges/Through Your Window" in August 2022.

Julie spent two years writing My Anti-Aircraft Friend, although some of its songs date back to 2019. Recording sessions commenced in December 2022, after Pourzand and Elizabeth both dropped out of SCI-Arc to focus on Julie. The band worked in a non-linear fashion, writing and recording material at various recording studios in California in between tours. The band's contract with Atlantic gave them complete freedom, and the lack of external pressures allowed them to focus solely on the album, although their perfectionism and insistence on handling all artwork themselves would protract its conception. Recording took place at EastWest, Panoramic House, Secret Hand, Palomino Sound and Octopus Beak. Working with producer Sonny DiPerri, the band recorded their songs live, rehearsing extensively beforehand and adjusting their tones before and during recording.

== Composition and lyrics ==
My Anti-Aircraft Friend has been described as shoegaze, (Note: In contemporary interviews, the members of Julie rejected the band's categorization as shoegaze, stating that whilst their association with the label played a role in their initial success, it had become limiting. When asked by The Fader what they wanted My Anti-Aircraft Friend to instead be described as, they offered the terms "beauty," "melancholy" and "destruction".) grunge, indie rock, alternative rock, and nu-gaze. Kelsey McClure of Dork described its sound as "experimental alternative". Backed by raw, live-sounding production, its songs feature fuzzy, distorted soundscapes, dynamic arrangements alternating in speed and intensity, and vocal interplay. Danielle Chelosky of Stereogum respectively described Elizabeth and Pourzand's vocals as an "expressive soprano" and "aloof drawl". John Wohlmacher of Beats Per Minute believed the album's musical direction was heavily inspired by alternative acts from 1989 to 1993 and listed Eric's Trip, Sonic Youth, early My Bloody Valentine and Nirvana as "reference points". David Renshaw of The Fader identified Unwound as a "major influence" on "Tenebrist" and "Very Little Effort". Jonathan Garrett of NME found its emphasis on rhythm and overall "egalitarian musical approach" contrasted with other contemporary shoegaze and nu gaze acts. The album's mixing places the bass above the guitar at points, providing not so much a "counterpoint [...] as a contrapuntal bludgeoning", according to Pitchfork's Matthew Schnipper. Lyrically, the album's songs are themed around unhealthy relationships, mental health, identity, anxiety, insecurities, uncertainty, and "existential angst". Chelosky said the lyrics detail "malaise, envy, and vague evils" and considered them threatening, whilst Consequence's Paolo Ragusa described them as impressionistic.

My Anti-Aircraft Friend opens with "Catalogue", a "grunge-pop" song that drew stylistic comparisons to Sonic Youth. Elizabeth said the song is about "the never ending cycle of just wanting to get somewhere and never actually enjoying the process". Following a brief interlude, the song turns into "squall of feedback", building anticipation before abruptly ending. "Tenebrist" features unusual tempo changes and was compared to Deftones and Eric's Trip by Wohlmacher. Ondarock's Claudio Lancia compared its "half-hearted singing" to Dinosaur Jr. "Very Little Effort" opens with a bass solo by Elizabeth, and its initial "low-energy ethos" subsequently devolves into feedback and distortion. Wohlmacher described its lyrical and vocal dynamics as a "harsh observation of toxic domestic life" comparable to Sonic Youth's 1995 album Washing Machine. "Clairbourne Practice" features stop-start dynamics between speed and harmony and duelling vocals, intended by Julie to represent "two voices conflicting [...] saying the same thing and still not hearing each other". Renshaw viewed the song as decipting two people unable to make each other happy. The song ends with "thrash[ing] and halt[ing]" guitars and a distorted message for "troubled students". "Knob" is one of Julie's oldest songs, dating back to 2019, but the last to be completed for the album. Pourzand said that whilst he no longer stylistically identified with the song, he found affinity with it as a result: "It feels sort of fresh again, if that makes sense". John Bungley of Mojo compared its dynamics to Slint.

"Feminine Adornments", sung solely by Elizabeth, takes its name from a quote in Giles Deleuze and Félix Guattari's 1972 book Anti-Oedipus. She intended the song as a "sing-along" about self-confidence and self-doubt. "I'll Cook My Own Meals" features ominous, "detached intonations" from Pourzand that are subsequently "drowned out by [a] wave of menacing, aggressive guitars", per Chelosky. "Piano Instrumental" alternates between slow and fast rhythms respectively led by Pourzand and Elizabeth, and features structural "anti-climaxes". Composed from various ideas the members of Julie had, the album closer "Stuck in a Car with Angels" slowly builds up tension as it progresses and moves from a ballad at the start to a "loud grunge anthem" by its end.

== Release and promotion ==
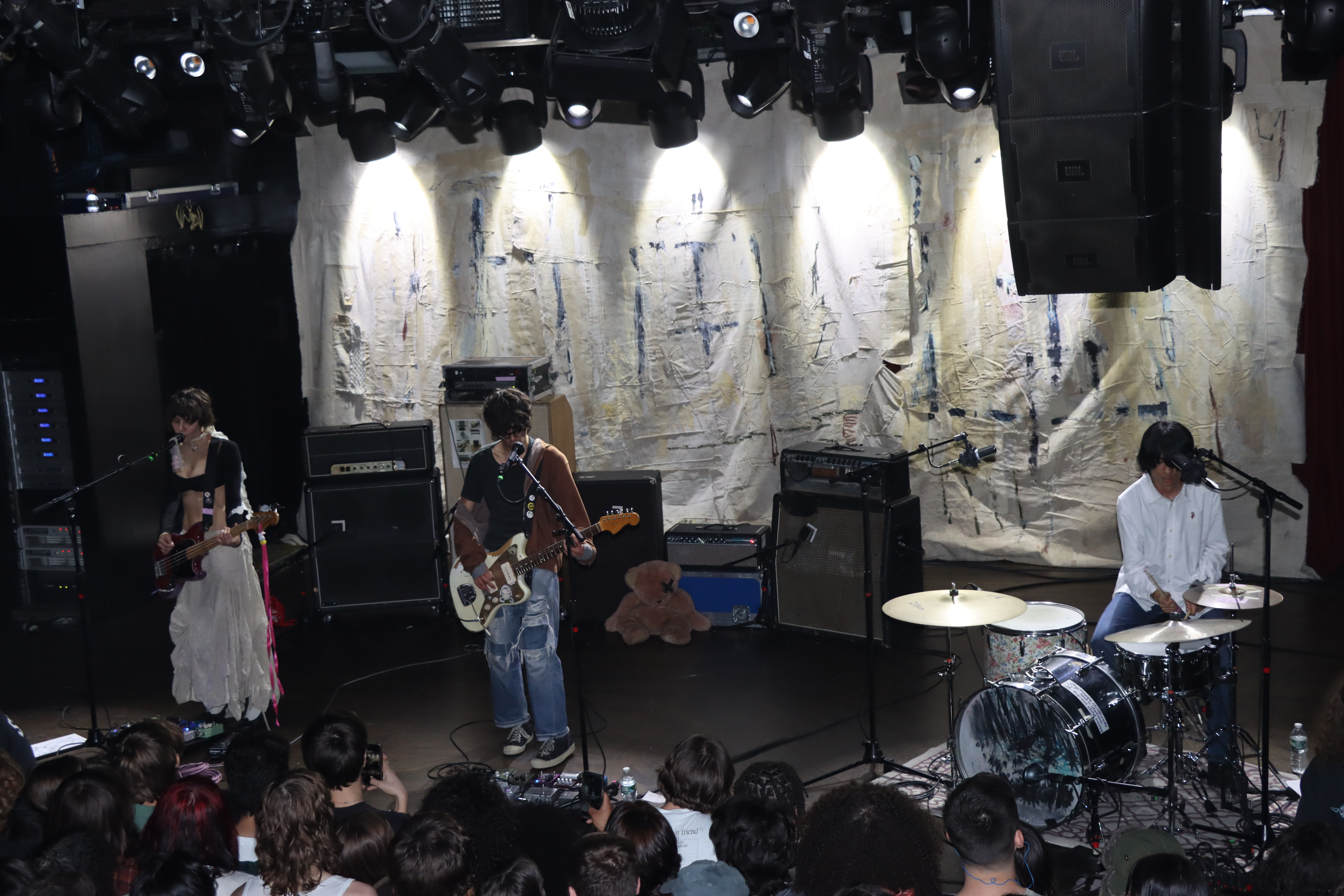
Julie performing in Boston in October 2024

On September 29, 2023, Julie released "Catalogue" as the lead single from My Anti-Aircraft Friend. The band was still working on the album at the time. On July 10, 2024, Julie announced the album and its release date and released its second single "Clairbourne Practice", alongside a music video directed by the band and Lizzie Klein. On August 21, they released the album's third and final single, "Very Little Effort". The album was released through Atlantic Records on September 13, 2024. The album's cover artwork was drawn by Lee, and features his character Macy, who appears in other Julie-related artworks. According to Renshaw, the cover decipts a woman playing guitar with her back turned to an amplifier "erupting with color". On May 5, 2025, a music video for "Feminine Adornments" was released.

Between July 22–30, 2024, Julie toured as support for Faye Webster. The band played three shows with Hello Mary before supporting Alex G on his tour of North America during August 2024. Following the album's release, Julie embarked on a headlining tour with They Are Gutting a Body of Water, Frost Children, and Her New Knife from October 8 to November 13, 2024. In February 2025, the band toured Australia, where they played two headline shows and performed at the Laneway Festival. The band commenced their debut headlining tour of Europe later that month into March 2025. On April 11, Julie performed at Coachella. In June, they performed at the Manchester edition of Outbreak, and at Primavera Sound, and appeared at the Lollapalooza and Outside Lands festivals in July and August.

== Critical reception ==
Professional ratings
Review scores
Source	Rating
Beats Per Minute	76%
Dork	4/5 stars
Mojo	4/5 stars
Ondarock	7.5/10
Pitchfork	8.1/10
Sputnikmusic	4.0/5
Tom Hull – on the Web	B+

My Anti-Aircraft Friend was well-received by critics. Upon release, Stereogum listed it as their "Album of the Week", with Chelosky calling it "the result of a young band whose vision is fully fleshed and passionately executed." Garrett of NME praised its uncompromising nature, deeming it "a welcome anomaly among major label releases in 2024." Josh Moore of Pigeons & Planes called it a "meticulously crafted" record that refines Julie's sound and "tears away at any confusion of who [the band] is, freeing them of unfitting labels". Rolling Stone's Jon Dolan highlighted the "shy, distracted passion" of Pourzand and Elizabeth's vocal performances. Bungey of Mojo praised the album's songwriting and called Lee's drumming "heroic throughout".

Pitchfork's Schnipper said that although he did not consider My Anti-Aircraft Friend to be wholly original in conception—with Julie arriving amongst other bands inspired by 1990s music—he considered them to be above their peers as they had "figured out how to absorb their influences while iterating their way into innovation". Likewise, Sputnikmusic's Artificialbox felt the band "sound more like peers than copycats" of their influences and praised their "scrupulous attention to detail". Wohlmacher of Beats Per Minute felt that Julie presented a musical and thematical "counter-position to [the] Zoomer lifestyle" contrasting with their influences and considered it a promising debut album, although he found its production and dynamics lacking compared to Pushing Daisies. Racket's Austin Gerth deemed the album "most remarkable" for its lack of major label compromise and concluded it was a "classic debut-as-advertisement-for-the-show". Tom Hull gave the album a B+ grade with a one-star "honorable mention", stating it "Fills a niche".

Ones to Watch ranked My Anti-Aircraft Friend as the 23rd best album of 2024, whilst LAist listed it as one of the best albums from the SoCal area that year. NME listed it as one of the "20 Best Debut Albums of 2024". Pitchfork ranked the album 19th on its list of the "30 Best Rock Albums of 2024", whilst Rolling Stone ranked it at number 35 on its list of the "50 Best Indie Rock Albums of 2024". Pitchfork also listed "Clairbourne Practice" as the 34th greatest song of 2024; Consequence ranked "Very Little Effort" at number 141 on its equivalent list.

== Track listing ==
All tracks are written by Julie.

My Anti-Aircraft Friend track listing
No.	Title	Length
1.	"Catalogue"	3:14
2.	"Tenebrist"	3:35
3.	"Very Little Effort"	4:16
4.	"Clairbourne Practice"	3:08
5.	"Knob"	5:03
6.	"Thread, Stitch"	4:20
7.	"Feminine Adornments"	4:13
8.	"I'll Cook My Own Meals"	3:16
9.	"Piano Instrumental"	4:30
10.	"Stuck in a Car with Angels"	3:40
Total length:		39:16

Notes

- All tracks are stylized in all lowercase.
- "I'll Cook My Own Meals" is stylized as "ill cook my own meals".

== Personnel ==
Adapted from liner notes.

Julie
- Keyan Pourzand – vocals, guitar
- Alexandria Elizabeth – vocals, bass
- Dillon Lee – drums

Artwork

- Julie – artwork, illustrations, design
Production
- Julie – production
- Sonny DiPerri – production, mixing
- Rich Costey – mixing
- Tyler Karmen – engineering
- Mike Kriebel – engineering
- Alex Prieto – engineering
- Greg Truitt – assistant engineer
- Logan Taylor – assistant engineer
- Jeremy Harris – assistant engineer
- Jeff Citron – assistant engineer
- Stephen Marcussen – mastering (at Marcussen Mastering)
