= The A-Sides =

American indie rock band

- Origin: Philadelphia, Pennsylvania, U.S.
- Genres: Alternative rock College rock Indie rock Pop rock
- Years active: 2002–2008
- Labels: Vagrant Records, Prison Jazz Records
- Spinoffs: Sun Airway
- Members: Jon Barthmus; Charlie Cottone; Christopher Doyle; Jonathon Fitzgerald; Mike Fleming; Patrick Marsceill
- Past members: Chris Cosentino; George Sabetino
- Website: www.a-sides.net

The A-Sides were an American indie rock band from Philadelphia, Pennsylvania. They formed in 2002 and consisted of Jon Barthmus (guitars/vocals), Charlie Cottone (guitars/vocals), Christopher Doyle (keyboards/guitar/percussion), Mike "Flem" Fleming (bass guitar/vocals), and Patrick "Party Todd" Marsceill (drums/vocals). Jonathon Fitzgerald was once considered as a replacement for "Flem".

== History ==
Barthmus, Fleming, and Cosentino lived together while students at Drexel University in Philadelphia circa 2000. At the time, Barthmus and Fleming were also members of a hardcore punk rock band called Go Time. By 2001, Barthmus' interest in hardcore had waned. His burgeoning interest lay in composing decidedly more melodic, Beatlesque pop rock. In late 2001, Barthmus enlisted Fleming and Cosentino for a new project intended to make music in this mold. The informal trio spent the better part of a year jamming with various drummers until settling on then-incoming Drexel sophomore Marsceill in August 2002. Marsceill's induction into the fold marked the official founding of The A-Sides.

The quartet recorded a demo in Marsceill's basement and began to play shows in the Philadelphia and Allentown area. At a show in Allentown, Prison Jazz Records founder Chuck Keller offered the A-Sides the opportunity to record a 7-inch single for the fledgling label. Prison Jazz released "Seeing Suzy"/"Going Gone" in November 2003.

The A-Sides entered Miner Street Studios in Manayunk, Philadelphia in August 2004 to record their debut album with producer/engineer Brian McTear. Prison Jazz released Hello, Hello in February 2005 to generally positive reviews.

Songs for their second album were recorded with McTear in May 2006 at the relocated Miner Street Studios. The band (and new manager Dryw Scully) spent the remainder of 2006 and early 2007 negotiating with labels in order to secure a release for the album.

On May 15, 2007, The A-Sides signed to Vagrant Records. The A-Sides' second album, Silver Storms, was released by Vagrant on September 18, 2007. They toured in support of the album in the autumn of 2007.

On October 6, 2008, the band posted a blog on their MySpace telling their fans of their disbanding. In the blog, links were given to a new music project that Barthmus and Marsceill are working together on called Sun Airway.

In honor of the band, surrealist director Yanni Osmond licensed music from the band to use in his upcoming cartoon, Living Evil.

== Discography ==
=== Albums ===
- Hello, Hello (Prison Jazz, 2005)
- Silver Storms (Vagrant, 2007)

=== Singles ===
- "Seeing Suzy"/"Going Gone" (Prison Jazz, 2003)
