= I Love You. It's a Fever Dream. =

Studio album by the Tallest Man on Earth
- Released: 19 April 2019
- Genre: Folk
- Length: 39:49
- Label: Dead Oceans
- Producer: Kristian Matsson

The Tallest Man on Earth chronology
A Collaborative EP with yMusic (2017)	I Love You. It's a Fever Dream. (2019)	Too Late for Edelweiss (2022)

Singles from I Love You. It's a Fever Dream.
- 1. "The Running Styles of New York" Released: 28 February 2019; 2. "I'm a Stranger Now" Released: 27 March 2019

Professional ratings
Review scores
Source	Rating
Consequence of Sound	B−
Pitchfork	7.3/10
Sputnikmusic	5.0/5; 2.8/5

I Love You. It's a Fever Dream. is the fifth LP by the Tallest Man on Earth. It was released digitally on 19 April 2019, and was released on CD and vinyl in June 2019, through the label Dead Oceans.

== Track listing ==
All tracks are written by Kristian Matsson.

No.	Title	Length
1.	"Hotel Bar"	4:30
2.	"The Running Styles of New York"	5:12
3.	"There's a Girl"	3:22
4.	"My Dear"	3:42
5.	"What I've Been Kicking Around"	3:29
6.	"I'm a Stranger Now"	4:21
7.	"Waiting for My Ghost"	3:56
8.	"I'll Be a Sky"	3:53
9.	"All I Can Keep Is Now"	3:46
10.	"I Love You. It's a Fever Dream."	3:38
Total length:		39:49

== Personnel ==
- Kristian Matsson – instruments and vocals

== Charts ==
Chart (2019)	Peak position
Swedish Albums (Sverigetopplistan)	52
US Independent Albums (Billboard)	31
