= Shallow Grave (album) =

Studio album by The Tallest Man on Earth
- Released: 5 March 2008
- Genre: Folk
- Length: 30:25
- Label: Gravitation

The Tallest Man on Earth chronology
| The Tallest Man on Earth (2006) | Shallow Grave (2008) | The Wild Hunt (2010) |

Professional ratings
Review scores
| Source | Rating |
|---|---|
| AllMusic | 4.5/5 stars |
| Pitchfork | 8.3/10 |
| Sputnikmusic | 4.5/5 |

Shallow Grave is the debut studio album by Swedish folk musician The Tallest Man on Earth. It was released on 5 March 2008 by the record label Gravitation.

Shallow Grave borrows heavily from American folk music and includes many references to the lyrics of such music as well as antiquated terminology of the American lexicon, albeit seen through the lens of a Northern European. "The Gardener" was released as the album's first single.

== Track listing ==
All tracks are written by Kristian Matsson.

| No. | Title | Length |
|---|---|---|
| 1. | "I Won't Be Found" | 2:47 |
| 2. | "Pistol Dreams" | 3:34 |
| 3. | "Honey Won't You Let Me In" | 2:56 |
| 4. | "Shallow Grave" | 2:37 |
| 5. | "Where Do My Bluebird Fly" | 3:17 |
| 6. | "The Gardener" | 3:56 |
| 7. | "The Blizzard's Never Seen the Desert Sands" | 2:01 |
| 8. | "The Sparrow and the Medicine" | 3:06 |
| 9. | "Into the Stream" | 2:47 |
| 10. | "This Wind" | 3:24 |
| Total length: | | 30:25 |
