= The Wild Hunt (The Tallest Man on Earth album) =

Studio album by the Tallest Man on Earth
- Released: 13 April 2010
- Genre: Folk
- Length: 34:38
- Label: Dead Oceans

The Tallest Man on Earth chronology
Shallow Grave (2008)	The Wild Hunt (2010)	Sometimes the Blues Is Just a Passing Bird (2010)

The Wild Hunt is the second studio album by Swedish folk musician the Tallest Man on Earth. It was released on 13 April 2010 by Dead Oceans.

As of 2011, the album has sold 35,524 copies in United States, according to Nielsen SoundScan.

== Critical reception ==
Professional ratings
Aggregate scores
Source	Rating
AnyDecentMusic?	7.3/10
Metacritic	79/100
Review scores
Source	Rating
AllMusic	4/5 stars
The A.V. Club	B+
Consequence of Sound	4.5/5 stars
The Guardian	4/5 stars
The Independent	4/5 stars
NME	6/10
Pitchfork	8.5/10
Q	3/5 stars
Spin	8/10
Uncut	4/5 stars

Critical reception for The Wild Hunt was generally positive. The album has a score of 79 out of 100 on the review aggregate website Metacritic based on reviews from 26 critics.

The Wild Hunt was voted the top album of 2010 by the staff of Sputnikmusic. Pitchfork placed it at number 33 on its list of the top 50 albums of 2010.

== Track listing ==
All tracks are written by Kristian Matsson.

No.	Title	Length
1.	"The Wild Hunt"	3:22
2.	"Burden of Tomorrow"	3:34
3.	"Troubles Will Be Gone"	3:02
4.	"You're Going Back"	3:05
5.	"The Drying of the Lawns"	2:54
6.	"King of Spain"	3:26
7.	"Love Is All"	4:15
8.	"Thousand Ways"	2:53
9.	"A Lion's Heart"	3:15
10.	"Kids on the Run"	4:52
Total length:		34:38

Bonus track
No.	Title	Length
11.	"Like the Wheel"	3:58
Total length:		38:36

== Charts ==
Chart (2010)	Peak position
Dutch Albums (Album Top 100)	82
Swedish Albums (Sverigetopplistan)	38
UK Albums (Official Charts)	157
UK Independent Albums (Official Charts)	30
US Billboard 200	176
US Americana/Folk Albums (Billboard)	5
US Heatseekers Albums (Billboard)	4
US Independent Albums (Billboard)	27
