= Julie (band) =

American rock band

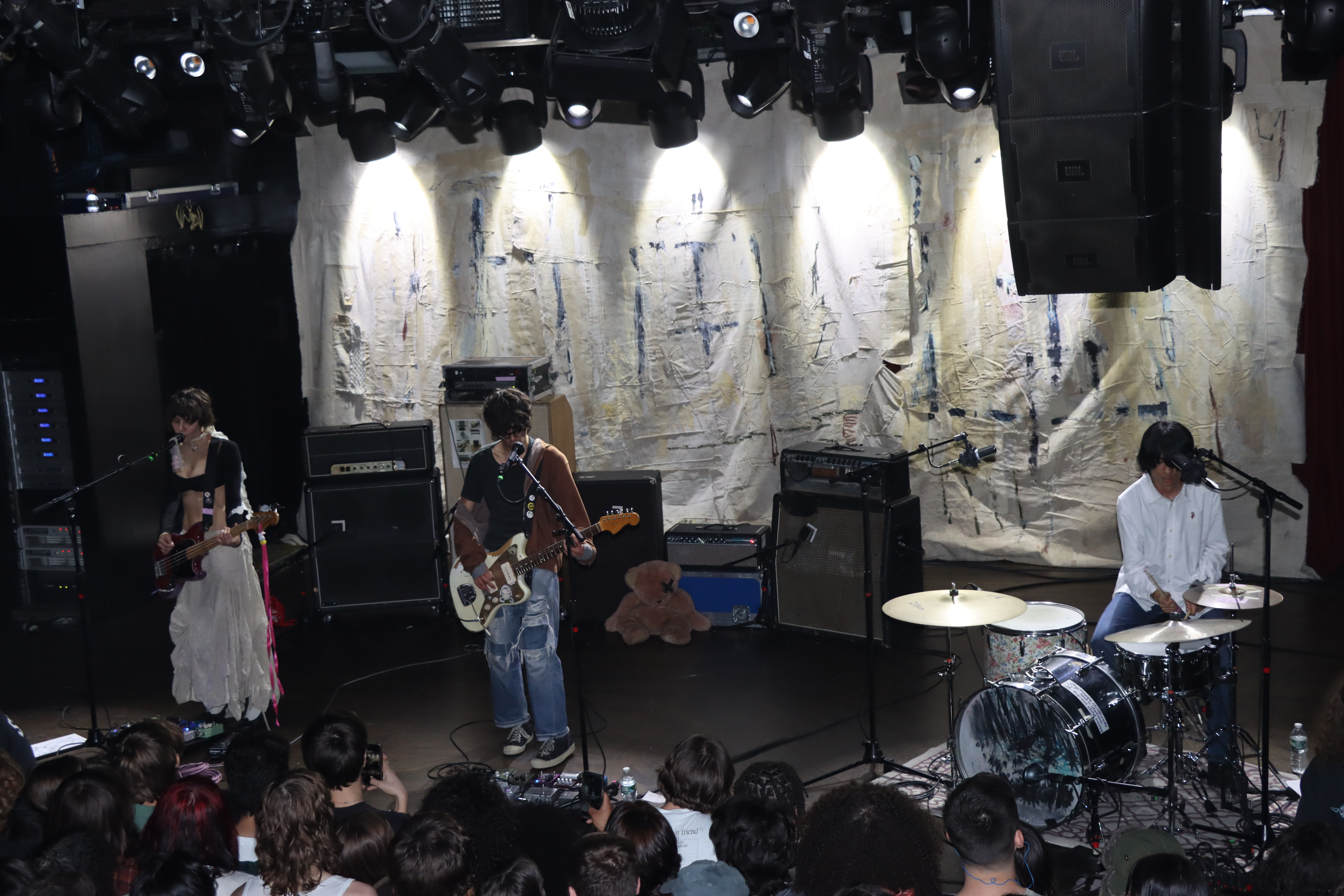
- Julie performing live in Boston, 2024

Background information
- Origin: Orange County, California, U.S.
- Genres: Noise rock; shoegaze
- Years active: 2018–present
- Label: Atlantic
- Members: Alex Brady; Dillon Lee; Keyan Pourzand
- Website: myantiaircraftfriend.com

Julie (stylized in all lowercase) is an American rock band from Los Angeles, California. The lineup consists of vocalist-guitarist Keyan Pourzand, vocalist-bassist Alex Brady, and drummer Dillon Lee. They formed in 2018 and are currently signed to Atlantic Records.

== History ==
Julie, originating in Orange County, California formed sometime in 2018, and subsequently self-released singles that created early support for the band, including "Flutter". In 2021, the group released their debut EP, Pushing Daisies. In 2022, Julie released two new songs titled "Pg.4 a Picture of Three Hedges" and "Through Your Window". In the same year, they were signed to Atlantic Records. In 2024, the group announced their debut full-length album, My Anti-Aircraft Friend, which was released on September 13 via Atlantic Records. Ahead of the album's release, singles "Catalogue," "Clairbourne Practice," and "Very Little Effort" were released. The group was named "One to Watch" by The Guardian.

== Musical style and influences ==
Julie's music has been categorised as shoegaze and noise rock. They are a major player in the 2020s wave of shoegaze. Office Magazine also calling them a part of the "canon" of 2020s noise rock, stating that much of said 2020s shoegaze is, in fact, noise rock. NME stated their music is "in stark contrast to the increasingly long list" of artists at the time playing the shoegaze and nu metal fusion nu-gaze", while Teen Vogue named them as a nu-gaze band.

They have cited influences including Henry's Dress, the Breeders, Nirvana, Sonic Youth, My Bloody Valentine and Swirlies.

== Members ==
- Keyan Pourzand – vocals, guitar (2018–present)
- Alex Brady (aka Alexandria Elizabeth) – vocals, bass (2018–present)
- Dillon Lee – drums (2018–present)

== Discography ==
=== Studio albums ===
| Title | Details |
|---|---|
| My Anti-Aircraft Friend | Released: September 13, 2024; Label: Atlantic; Formats: LP, CD, digital download, streaming |

=== EPs ===
| Title | Details |
|---|---|
| Pushing Daisies | Released: August 12, 2021; Label: Self-released; Format: 10", cassette, digital download, streaming |

=== Singles ===
| Title | Year | Album |
|---|---|---|
| "Flutter" | 2020 | Non-album singles |
| "Starjump" / "Kit" | 2020 | Non-album singles |
| "Pg.4 a Picture of Three Hedges" / "Through Your Window" | 2022 | Non-album singles |
| "Catalogue" | 2023 | My Anti-Aircraft Friend |
| "Clairbourne Practice" | 2024 | My Anti-Aircraft Friend |
| "Very Little Effort" | 2024 | My Anti-Aircraft Friend |
