= They Are Gutting a Body of Water =

American rock band

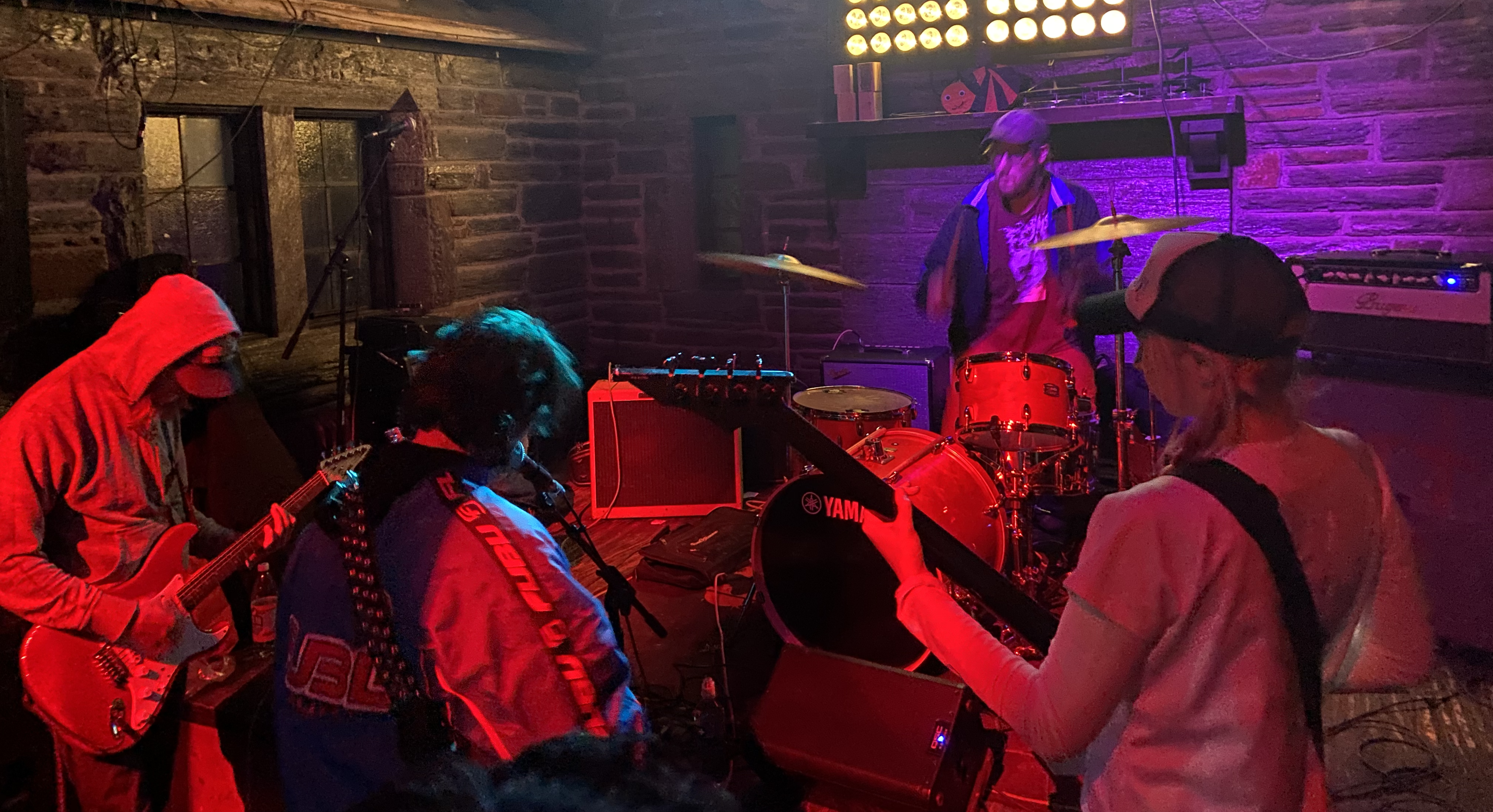
- TAGABOW performing in 2023

Background information
- Origin: Philadelphia, Pennsylvania, U.S.
- Genres: Shoegaze; electronic; experimental rock; sampledelia
- Years active: 2017–present
- Labels: ATO; Bee Side Cassettes; Citrus City; Julia's War; Topshelf; Smoking Room
- Spinoffs: FC goris; god of war
- Spinoff of: Jouska
- Members: Douglas Dulgarian; Emily Lofing; PJ Carroll; Ben Opatut
- Past members: Josh Lesser; Julia McCue; Cooper Beaupre

They Are Gutting a Body of Water (stylized in all lowercase; acronymized as TAGABOW) is an American shoegaze band from Philadelphia, Pennsylvania. The band was initially the solo project of songwriter and guitarist Douglas Dulgarian, but has expanded to a full lineup including bassist Emily Lofing, guitarist PJ Carroll, and drummer Ben Opatut.

== History ==
Douglas Dulgarian (born 1990 or 1991) grew up traveling between Middletown, New York, and North Jersey, where his father and mother lived respectively. At age 16, Dulgarian was prescribed painkillers after getting hit by a car, which led to him developing a heroin addiction. He relocated to Albany for rehab in 2010 and, while there, formed the band Jouska. In 2016, Jouska put out the album topiary. Dulgarian moved to Philadelphia and began to perform as TAGABOW with drummer Ben Opatut shortly thereafter.

TAGABOW began as a solo project by Dulgarian with the tapes they are gutting a body of water and sweater curse. The band released its first proper album, gestures been, in 2018. In 2019, TAGABOW released Destiny XL, which was recorded in a former house show venue in West Philadelphia. The album was re-released in 2021 by Citrus City Records. In 2022, the band announced their signing to California label Smoking Room and released the split EP An Insult to the Sport and the album lucky styles. (Note: Written as 's' on streaming services) That same year, Jouska released visions from the bridge, originally planned for 2018, and Dulgarian put out a rap EP under the name FC Goris. In 2023, Dulgarian contributed to seven tracks on Jane Remover's album Census Designated, and TAGABOW released the visual album Expansion Pak on YouTube. In 2024, the band released the single "Krillin" featuring Greg Mendez and Sun Organ. The band signed to ATO Records and released LOTTO, their first album for them, in 2025. On October 16, 2026, they released KOOL FAITH/LOOSIES II, a mixtape with 29 tracks and several featured artists including Hotline TNT, Spirit of the Beehive, and Her New Knife.

Dulgarian also runs Julia's War Recordings, which has put out music from acts including Feeble Little Horse, Wednesday, and MJ Lenderman. Rather than focusing on certain genres, Julia's War releases "whatever music [Dulgarian] likes, usually made by his friends".

== Reception and musical style ==
TAGABOW's music has been highly praised by critics. Philadelphia radio station WXPN wrote that "[d]espite being a sonic blur, Destiny XL has this eerie ability to elicit hyper-specific feelings that blindside you" and described the band as "a homage to the unknown, to the visceral, and to the things that haunt us." Stereogum described An Insult to the Sport as "one of the year's best EPs", called lucky styles "beautiful and fascinating", and included TAGABOW as part of a larger "new wave of American shoegaze". NPR described lucky styles as "a twisted tour of the band's every impulse". Chicago Reader praised the "loose, uninhibited creativity" of lucky styles and said the band "toy[s] with shoegaze like Van Leeuwen screws around with ice cream".

Genres besides shoegaze that have influenced the band include drum and bass, breakcore, jungle, and reggaeton. TAGABOW has been compared to the Irish/British band My Bloody Valentine and to Philadelphia contemporaries Alex G, the Spirit of the Beehive, and Blue Smiley. Dulgarian has additionally cited the Philadelphia bands Sun Organ, Cooking, Spellbinder, and Nyxy Nyx and the Baltimore band Teen Suicide as influences on TAGABOW's sound and William Gibson's book Neuromancer as an influence on Destiny XL specifically.

Original jungle, breakcore, and ambient interludes produced by Dulgarian feature prominently on both Destiny XL and lucky styles, and are played on a sampler while the band tunes during live sets. Dulgarian began producing jungle and electronic music after an injury to his left arm prevented him from playing guitar while undergoing physical therapy. TAGABOW is known to perform on the floor instead of the stage while facing away from the audience. At one point, they played a show at a Sonic Drive-In in New Jersey.

== Discography ==
=== Studio albums ===
List of studio albums, with selected details
Title	Album details
Gestures Been	Released: April 27, 2018; Label: Self-released; Format: Digital download
Destiny XL	Released: October 17, 2019; Labels: Self-released, Citrus City; Formats: Digital download, cassette
Lucky Styles	Released: October 17, 2022; Label: Smoking Room; Formats: Digital download, cassette, 12" vinyl
Lotto	Released: October 17, 2025; Label: ATO, Smoking Room, Julia's War; Formats: Digital download, cassette, LP, CD

=== Live albums ===
List of live albums, with selected details
Title	Album details
They Are Gutting a Body of Water on Audiotree Live	Released: August 16, 2022; Label: Audiotree; Format: Streaming

=== Extended plays ===
List of extended plays, with selected details
Title	EP details	Notes
Sweater Curse	Released: January 1, 2017; Label: Fuzz Records; Format: Streaming, cassette	
The Kid from a Dream Who Called It a Body Hi	Released: July 14, 2018; Label: Self-released; Format: Streaming	
Epcot	Released: November 14, 2021; Labels: Julia's War; Formats: Streaming, cassette	Split EP with Full Body 2
An Insult to the Sport	Released: September 14, 2022; Label: Topshelf; Formats: Digital download, 10" vinyl	Split EP with A Country Western
Expansion Pak	Released: October 17, 2023; Label: Self-released, Bee Side Cassettes; Formats: Digital download, DVD	Visual EP

=== Mixtapes ===
List of mixtapes, with selected details
Title	Album details
Swanlike (Loosies 2020-2023)	Released: June 18, 2024; Label: Julia's War; Format: Digital download
Kool Faith/Loosies II	Released: October 16, 2026; Label: Julia's War, ATO; Format: Digital download, LP, CD, cassette

=== Singles ===
Title	Year
"Krillin" (featuring Greg Mendez and Sun Organ)	2024
"ana orint" (featuring Sword II)	2024

=== Jouska discography ===
- This Kid Thinks Hes Sick. EP (2015)
- Topiary (2016)
- From Elson to Emmett (2018)
- Visions from the Bridge (recorded 2018, released 2022)
