= Brazos (band) =

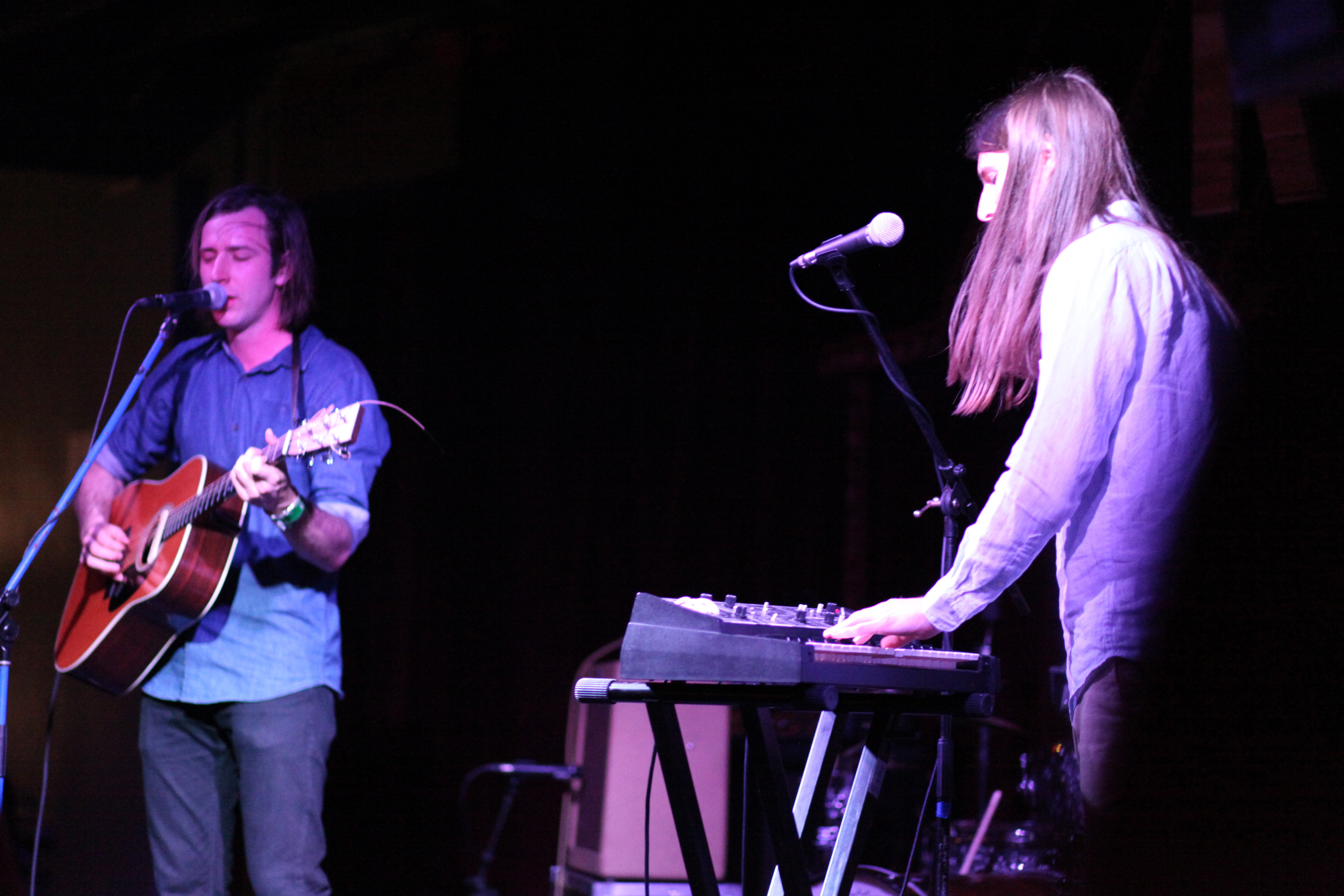

Background information
- Born: 1983 (age 42–43)
- Origin: Austin, Texas, United States
- Genres: Indie rock Indie folk
- Instruments: voice, guitar
- Years active: 2007–present
- Label: Dead Oceans
- Members: Martin McNulty Crane; Spencer Zahn; Ian Chang
- Website: brazosbrazos.com

Brazos is the moniker of Martin McNulty Crane. Originally from Austin, Texas, Brazos gained recognition in 2009 with the self-released debut album, "Phosphorescent Blues". He and the band are currently based in Brooklyn, New York.

== Overview ==
Brazos began as the solo recording project of songwriter Martin Crane, who debuted the band late 2007 with the EPs Feeding Frenzy and A City Just as Tall. Brazos, in its original incarnation, went on to open for Grizzly Bear, Shearwater, Vampire Weekend, The National, Iron & Wine, Wye Oak and Bowerbirds, as well as a national tour with local pals, White Denim.

Phosphorescent Blues was self released in 2009 to positive reviews but after touring took its toll, Crane "packed everything he owned into a 1990 Honda Civic station wagon that he'd had since he was 15 and moved to New York." and signed to Dead Oceans.

With new bandmates Spencer Zahn (bass) (who moonlights in Empress Of's band) and Ian Chang (drums) in tow, the band working on its Dead Oceans debut which ultimately became Saltwater which saw international release May 28, 2013.

== Discography ==
=== Albums ===
Year	Title	Label
2009	Phosphorescent Blues	Independent
2013	Saltwater	Dead Oceans
2022	Grab Hold of What Floats	Sudden Records

=== EP / Other Releases ===
Year	Title	Label
2007	A City Just as Tall EP	Autobus
2007	Feeding Frenzy EP	Independent
