= Time of the Last Persecution =

Studio album by Bill Fay
- Released: 1971
- Genre: Folk rock
- Length: 39:16
- Label: Deram
- Producer: Bill Fay; Ray Russell

Bill Fay chronology
Bill Fay (1970)	Time of the Last Persecution (1971)	Tomorrow Tomorrow and Tomorrow (2005)

Time of the Last Persecution is the second studio album by English singer-songwriter Bill Fay, released in 1971 by Deram Records. The album was influenced by the Biblical books of Daniel and Revelation. The album was re-released in 2005 with bonus tracks.

== Track listing ==
1. "Omega Day" – 3:14
2. "Don't Let My Marigolds Die" – 2:26
3. "I Hear You Calling" – 2:57
4. "Dust Filled Room" – 2:03
5. "'Til the Christ Come Back" – 3:08
6. "Release Is in the Eye" – 2:41
7. "Laughing Man" – 3:15
8. "Inside the Keepers Pantry" – 2:29
9. "Tell It Like It Is" – 2:32
10. "Plan D" – 3:12
11. "Pictures of Adolf Again" – 2:27
12. "Time of the Last Persecution" – 3:54
13. "Come a Day" – 2:27
14. "Let All the Other Teddies Know" – 2:31

== Personnel ==
- Bill Fay - Vocals, piano
- Ray Russell - Guitar
- Alan Rushton - Drums
- Darryl Runswick - Bass
- Nick Evans - Trombone
