= Bill Fay (album) =

Studio album by Bill Fay
- Released: 1970
- Genre: Folk rock
- Length: 34:43
- Label: Deram
- Producer: Peter Eden

Bill Fay chronology
Bill Fay (1970)	Time of the Last Persecution (1971)

Bill Fay is the debut studio album by English singer-songwriter Bill Fay, released in 1970 by Deram Records. The album was re-released in 2005 with the addition of the 1967 single "Some Good Advice" and its b-side "Screams in the Ears". The album cover features a photograph of Fay standing in water beside a lake in Hyde Park.

== Track listing ==
All tracks are written by Bill Fay

No.	Title	Length
1.	"Garden Song"	3:13
2.	"The Sun is Bored"	2:32
3.	"We Want You To Stay"	3:33
4.	"Narrow Way"	2:48
5.	"We Have Laid Here"	2:28
6.	"Sing Us One Your Songs May"	2:50
7.	"Gentle Willie"	3:15
8.	"Methane River"	2:57
9.	"The Room"	1:57
10.	"Goodnight Stan"	2:05
11.	"Cannons Plain"	2:26
12.	"Be Not So Fearful"	2:46
13.	"Down To The Bridge"	1:56

2005 Electra re-issue bonus tracks
No.	Title	Length
14.	"Screams In The Ears"	3:23
15.	"Some Good Advice"	2:21
