= The Spirit of the Beehive (band) =

American indie rock band

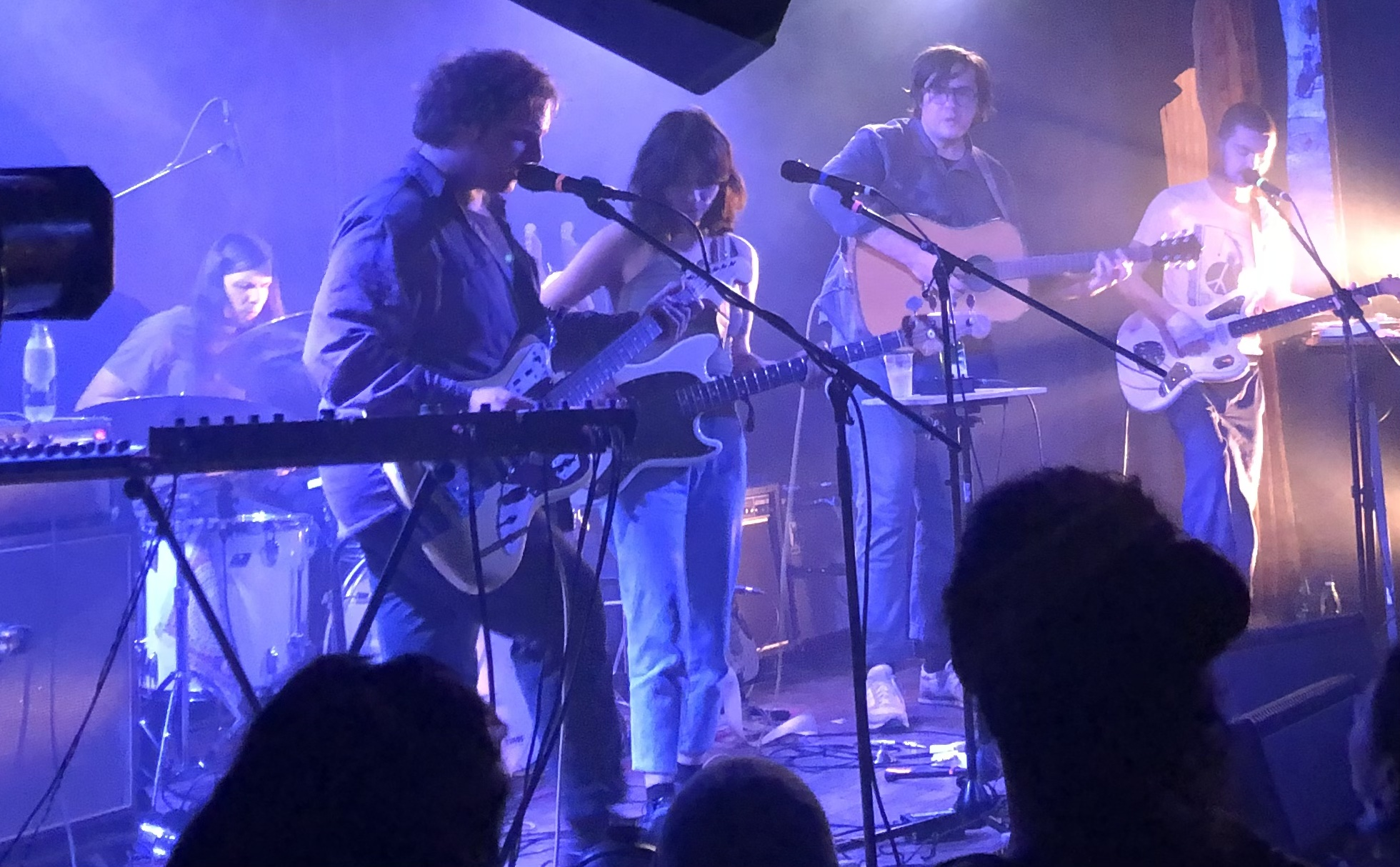
- The Spirit of the Beehive at La Sala Rossa in Montréal in 2022

Background information
- Origin: Philadelphia, Pennsylvania, U.S.
- Genres: Indie rock; psychedelic rock; neo-psychedelia; dream pop; slowcore; experimental rock
- Years active: 2014–present
- Labels: Ice Age; Ranch; Tiny Engines; Found Footage; Saddle Creek
- Spinoff of: Glocca Morra
- Members: Zack Schwartz; Rivka Ravede; Corey Wichlin
- Past members: Justin Fox; Timothy Jordan; Phil Warner; Derrick Brandon; Kyle Laganella; Pat Conaboy
- Website: Bandcamp page

The Spirit of the Beehive (often styled as SPIRIT OF THE BEEHIVE) is an American indie rock band from Philadelphia, Pennsylvania. The band name comes from the 1973 Spanish film of the same name.

The band features Zack Schwartz, formerly of the band Glocca Morra. Their debut self-titled album was released in 2014. An EP entitled You Are Arrived (But You've Been Cheated) was released in 2015. In 2017, the band released their second album, Pleasure Suck, on Tiny Engines. Their third album, Hypnic Jerks, was released through Tiny Engines in 2018. Their fourth album, Entertainment, Death, was released on April 9, 2021, on Saddle Creek Records. Their most recent EP, i'm so lucky, was released on September 1, 2023. Their fifth album, stylized in all caps, YOU'LL HAVE TO LOSE SOMETHING, was released on August 23, 2024, through Saddle Creek Records.

The band has toured with acts such as Japanese Breakfast, Pile, Ride, Dry Cleaning, Alex G and more.

== Members ==
=== Current ===
- Zack Schwartz – lead vocals, guitar, sampler, keyboards (2014–present)
- Rivka Ravede – lead vocals, bass, percussion (2014–present)
- Corey Wichlin – keyboards, sampler, guitar (2019–present), drums, vocals (2020–present)

=== Former ===
- Justin Fox – guitar, keyboards (2014–2016)
- Timothy Jordan – guitar, lead and backing vocals (2014–2016)
- Phil Warner – keyboards, guitar, percussion (2016–2018, touring 2022–present)
- Derrick Brandon – keyboards, sampler, guitar, percussion (2018–2019)
- Kyle Laganella – guitar (2018–2020, touring 2021)
- Pat Conaboy – drums, percussion (2014–2020), lead and backing vocals (2014–2016), electronic drums (2018–2020)

== Discography ==
=== Studio albums ===
- The Spirit of the Beehive (2014)
- Pleasure Suck (2017)
- Hypnic Jerks (2018)
- Entertainment, Death (2021)
- You'll Have To Lose Something (2024)

=== Extended plays ===
- You Are Arrived (But You've Been Cheated) (2015)
- i'm so lucky (2023)

=== Singles ===
- Ricky (Caught Me Tryin') (2017)
- Cops Come Looking (2017)
- Twenty First Road Trip (2017)
- can i receive the contact? (2018)
- d.o.u.b.l.e.u.r.o.n.g. (2018)
- hypnic jerks (2018)
- The Door Is Open (2020)
- THERE'S NOTHING YOU CAN'T DO (2021)
- THE SERVER IS IMMERSED (2021)
- THE DOOR IS CLOSING (2021)
- tapeworm / natural devotion 2 (2023)
- I LET THE VIRGIN DRIVE (2024)
- SOMETHING'S ENDING / I'VE BEEN EVIL (2024)
