= Dead Oceans =

American independent record label

Dead Oceans, Inc.
- Founded: June 30, 2006; 20 years ago
- Founder: Chris Swanson; Ben Swanson; Darius Van Arman; Jonathan Cargill; Phil Waldorf
- Distributor: Secretly Distribution
- Genre: Various
- Country of origin: United States
- Location: Bloomington, New York City, Los Angeles, London
- Official website: deadoceans.com

Dead Oceans, Inc., is an American independent record label founded in 2006 and based in Bloomington, Indiana. It operates as part of the Secretly Group, alongside Secretly Canadian and Jagjaguwar.

== History ==
On June 30, 2006, Phil Waldorf founded Dead Oceans with Chris Swanson. Swanson suggested the name Dead Oceans, which came from the lyrics of Bob Dylan's "A Hard Rain's a-Gonna Fall" (1963). Chris' brother Ben Swanson, Darius Van Arman, and Jonathan Cargill of Secretly Canadian and Jagjaguwar also helped to found the label. The label was officially launched in 2007, and is part of Secretly Group.

During its early years, Dead Oceans released albums by artists such as Phosphorescent, Dirty Projectors, Akron/Family, Califone and Bowerbirds. Over time, the label's roster expanded to include Mitski, Japanese Breakfast, Destroyer, and Phoebe Bridgers. The label also serves as the parent imprint for Saddest Factory Records, founded by Bridgers in 2020.

In 2012, Dead Oceans released Bill Fay's album Life Is People, his first in over forty years. In 2017, the label released shoegaze band Slowdive's first album in 22 years.

In 2018, Dead Oceans was ranked No. 7 on Paste magazine's top-10 record labels and won the Libera Award for Label of the Year.

In 2020, the label released the Bright Eyes album Down in the Weeds, Where the World Once Was. The following year, the band transferred its earlier recordings, previously released through Saddle Creek Records, to Dead Oceans.

== Artists ==
- A Place to Bury Strangers
- Akron/Family
- Alex Lahey
- Bear in Heaven
- Better Oblivion Community Center
- Bill Fay
- Bishop Allen
- Bleached
- Bowerbirds
- Brazos
- Bright Eyes
- Califone
- Cassandra Jenkins
- Citay
- Destroyer
- Dirty Projectors
- Dub Thompson
- Durand Jones & The Indications
- Evangelicals
- Fenne Lily
- Frog Eyes
- Gauntlet Hair
- Greg Mendez
- Japanese Breakfast
- Jensen McRae
- John Vanderslice
- Julianna Barwick
- Kane Strang
- Kevin Morby
- Khruangbin
- Mark McGuire
- Marlon Williams
- Mitski
- Mt. St. Helens Vietnam Band
- Nurses
- On Fillmore
- Phoebe Bridgers
- Phosphorescent
- Ryley Walker
- Scowl
- Shame
- Sloppy Jane
- Slowdive
- Strand of Oaks
- Sun Airway
- Tamino
- The Donkeys
- The Explorers Club
- The Luyas
- The Tallest Man on Earth
- These Are Powers
- Tom Rogerson
- Toro y Moi
- Wednesday
- White Hinterland
- Victoryland

== Notable releases ==
- Califone: All My Friends Are Funeral Singers (2009)
- Destroyer: Kaputt (2011)
- Bill Fay: Life Is People (2012)
- Slowdive: Slowdive (2017)
- Phoebe Bridgers: Stranger in the Alps (2017)
- Mitski: Be the Cowboy (2018)
- Bright Eyes: Down in the Weeds, Where the World Once Was (2020)
- Phoebe Bridgers: Punisher (2020)
- Khruangbin: Mordechai (2020)
- Japanese Breakfast: Jubilee (2021)
- Mitski: Laurel Hell (2022)
- Slowdive: Everything Is Alive (2023)
- Wednesday: Bleeds (2025)

== Grammy Awards (US/Global) ==
- Mitski ‘Be The Cowboy' - Best Recording Package (2019 nominated)
- Phoebe Bridgers - Best New Artist (2021 nominated)
- Phoebe Bridgers ‘Punisher' - Best Alternative Album (2021 nominated)
- Phoebe Bridgers 'Kyoto' (Phoebe Bridgers, Morgan Nagler & Marshall Vore, Songwriters) - Best Rock Song (2021 nominated)
- Phoebe Bridgers 'Kyoto' - Best Rock Performance (2021 nominated)
- Japanese Breakfast - Best New Artist (2022 nominated)
- Japanese Breakfast ‘Jubilee’ - Best Alternative Album (2022 nominated)
- Khruangbin - Best New Artist (2025 nominated)
- Japanese Breakfast - ‘For Melancholy Brunettes (& Sad Women)’ nomination best engineered non-classical album (2026 nominated)

== See also ==
- List of record labels
- Secretly Canadian
- Jagjaguwar
