= Jason Molina =

American musician (1973–2013)

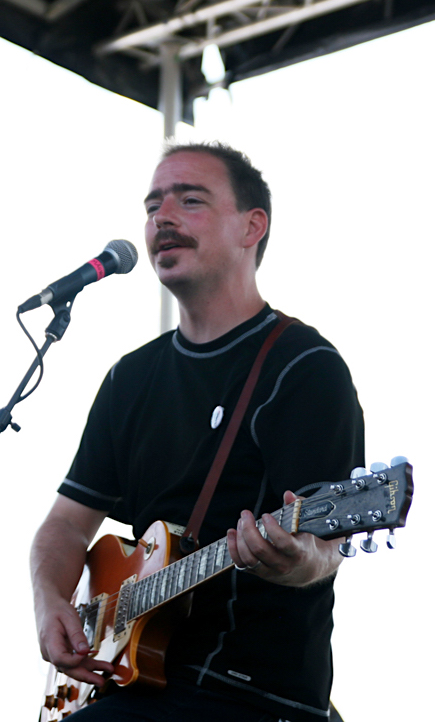
- Molina performing in 2009

Background information
- Born: Jason Andrew Molina; December 30, 1973; Oberlin, Ohio, U.S.
- Died: March 16, 2013 (aged 39) Indianapolis, Indiana, U.S.
- Genres: Indie rock; alternative country; lo-fi; slowcore; Americana
- Instruments: Vocals; guitar; bass
- Years active: 1995–2009
- Label: Secretly Canadian
- Website: songsohia.com

Jason Andrew Molina (December 30, 1973 – March 16, 2013) was an American musician, singer and songwriter. Raised in northern Ohio, he came to prominence performing and recording as Songs: Ohia, both in solo projects and with a rotating cast of musicians in the late 1990s. Beginning in 2003, he garnered a further indie following for his releases with the band Magnolia Electric Co.

Molina had a prolific career between his two musical projects and solo releases, producing a total of sixteen studio albums, eight EPs, and numerous singles. His overall discography was noted by critics for blending elements of indie rock, blues, and alternative country with his tenor vocal range.

In 2009, Molina canceled a European and U.S. tour with Will Johnson, citing health problems. He spent the next four years dealing with alcoholism, which ultimately resulted in his death from multiple organ failure in March 2013.

== Early life ==
Molina was born December 30, 1973 in Oberlin, Ohio. His father was a middle school teacher. He had one brother, Aaron, and one sister, Ashley. His paternal grandfather was a Spanish (Asturian) miner from the northern region of Asturias in Spain. Molina was raised in Lorain, Ohio, an industrial town 25 miles west of Cleveland, and grew up in a single-wide trailer on Lake Erie. He began playing guitar at age 10. Molina attended Admiral King High School, graduating in 1992. During school, he played bass guitar, most notably with the metal band Spineriders.

Molina attended Oberlin College, graduating with a Bachelor of Arts degree in art history in 1996. After playing bass guitar in various metal bands in and around Cleveland, Molina became a solo artist under an assumed band name, recruiting other musicians for each project as needed. He made several home recordings under various names, including "Songs: Albian", "Songs: Radix", and "Songs: Unitas", which he distributed himself at live performances.

== Career ==
=== Songs: Ohia: 1995–2003 ===
Songs: Ohia was largely a project of revolving musicians with Molina as its center and sole stable member. The band's genre is generally considered indie rock, lo-fi, folk, or alt-country. The second part of the name is an allusion to both the Hawaiian tree 'Ōhi'a lehua and Molina's home state of Ohio.

The first Songs: Ohia release came in 1995 as a single on Palace Records, Nor Cease Thou Never Now. This was followed by the 1997 full-length album Songs: Ohia (known among fans as The Black Album), released on the Bloomington, Indiana-based label Secretly Canadian.

In 2000, Molina released three albums: The Lioness, recorded near Glasgow by producer Andy Miller with help from Alasdair Roberts and members of Arab Strap; Ghost Tropic, recorded by Mike Mogis; and Protection Spells, a solo album sold at live shows and now out of print. By 2000, Molina had given his tenor guitar a rest in favor of a regular six-string electric guitar and put together a full band to back him, including brothers Rob and Dan Sullivan on bass and guitar, Jeff Panall on drums, and Jim Grabowski on organ. In the same year the touring band recorded a live album near Modena, Italy, released locally in 2001 as Mi Sei Apparso Come Un Fantasma.

In 2002, Molina recorded Didn't It Rain in Philadelphia with members of bluegrass band Jim & Jennie & the Pinetops. On the album, named after a Mahalia Jackson song, the band achieved an almost gospel sound that was a vast departure from the dense feel of Ghost Tropic. Constantly recording and writing new songs, Songs: Ohia released a handful of singles and EPs in 2002, including a split EP with My Morning Jacket and a collaborative EP (under the name Amalgamated Sons of Rest) with Will Oldham and Alasdair Roberts.

The 2003 release Magnolia Electric Co. marked a shift in direction for Songs: Ohia. Every song was recorded live in the studio with a full touring band plus musicians from Didn't It Rain. The album's sound draws heavily from the heartland rock and folk-rock of the 1960s/70s, as well as Molina's heavy metal roots.

=== Magnolia Electric Co.: 2003–2012 ===
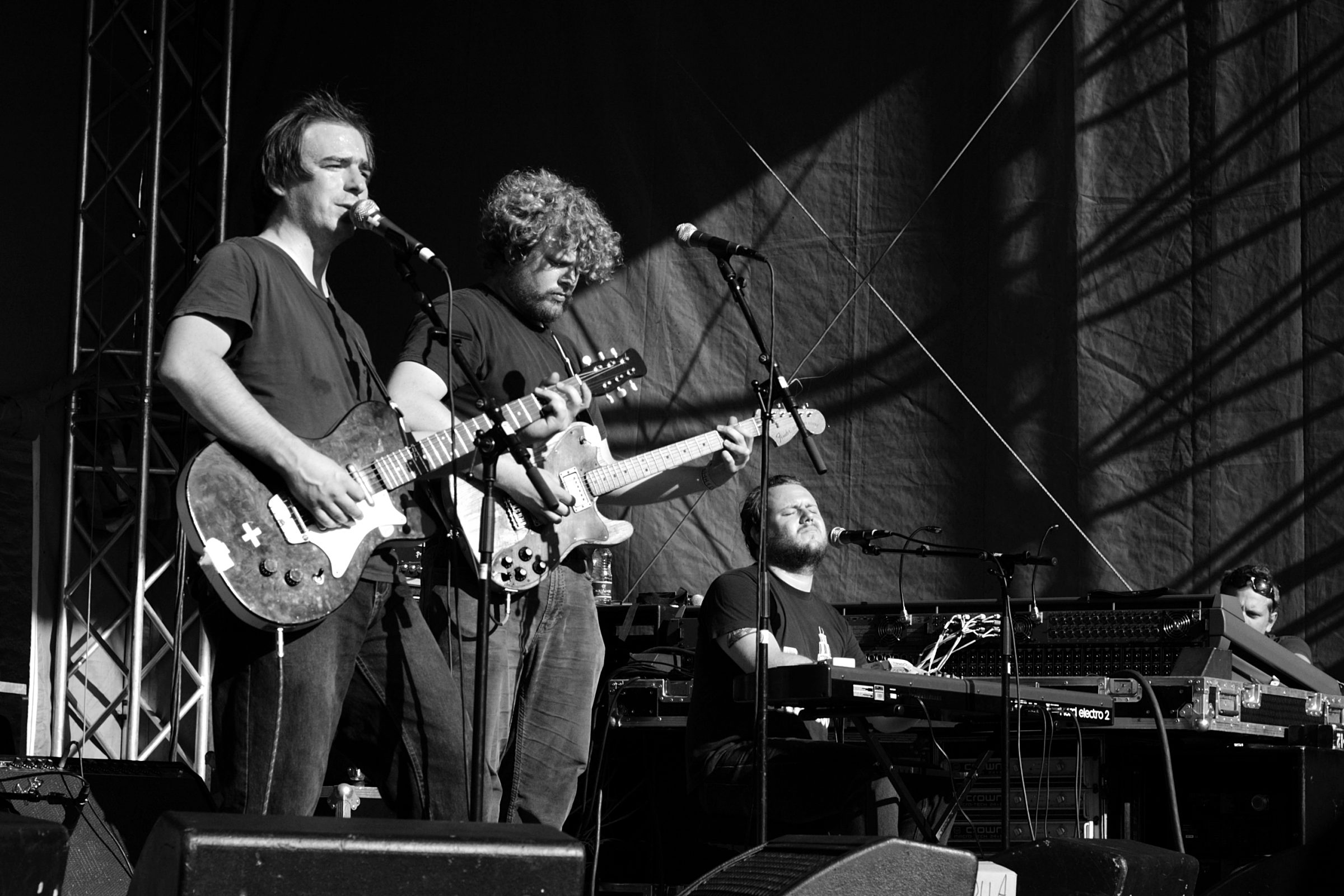
Molina (left) with his band Magnolia Electric Co. in 2005

In March 2003, while on tour, Molina announced that he would rename the band Magnolia Electric Co., retaining the stylistic direction of the album of the same name. He also continued to release solo work under his own name. The first such release came in January 2004 as the full-length vinyl release Pyramid Electric Co.

Engineered by Mike Mogis, who also engineered Ghost Tropic, Pyramid found Molina alone at the microphone with only his voice and a piano or guitar. Magnolia Electric Co.'s first official release was a live album, Trials and Errors, followed by a studio album, What Comes After the Blues, and an EP, Hard to Love a Man, all released in 2005. In 2006, Molina released two more records: the sparse solo Let Me Go, Let Me Go, Let Me Go and the more conventional Fading Trails with Magnolia Electric Co., the latter culled from three separate sessions over the previous year.

It is not entirely clear when Songs: Ohia became Magnolia Electric Co. In interviews, Molina claimed that he considered the tenure of Songs: Ohia over after Didn't It Rain, which would make Magnolia Electric Co. the self-titled debut album under the new name. The name "Songs: Ohia" appears nowhere on the artwork of the album and only a promotional sticker on the cellophane wrapping connects it with the prior name. Nevertheless, Secretly Canadian still promotes the album under the Songs: Ohia moniker. On the other hand, the Magnolia Electric Co. live album Trials and Errors was recorded on April 16, 2003, at the Ancienne Belgique club in Brussels, at a time when the band was still touring under the Songs: Ohia name. Pitchfork Media later reported that name change would be made official after the Spanish tour in October 2003.

=== Later years and illness: 2009–2013 ===
According to Magnolia Electric Co. bandmate Jason Groth, Molina "and the bottle had a complicated relationship" dating back as far as 2003. The full extent of his alcoholism was not revealed to many of his close friends until after 2009.

A European tour for Molina & Johnson in support of their self-titled album was scheduled for November and December 2009; the tour was canceled on November 23, three days before it was to begin. A brief note on the band's website blamed "health problems" (without elaborating) for the cancelations and noted, "Jason Molina is extremely disappointed but there is no way he can be on the road at the present time." A U.S. leg of the Molina & Johnson tour was scheduled for January and February 2010 but was canceled in early December with another brief note on the band's website citing Molina's "present health issues". Following this announcement, Molina effectively withdrew from public life.

On September 19, 2011, a message from Molina's family was posted on the Secretly Canadian Records website, titled "Where Is Jason Molina?", which said that over the preceding two years Molina had visited rehab facilities and hospitals in England, Chicago, Indianapolis, and New Orleans for an unnamed condition. His family wrote that he was "currently working on a farm in West Virginia raising goats and chickens for the next year or so, and is looking forward to making great music again."

On May 5, 2012, a post titled "a note from jason" was posted on the Magnolia Electric Co. website, explaining certain aspects of his situation for the first time. Saying that it had been "a long hospital year", Molina expressed gratitude and appreciation for the monetary and emotional support he had received from fans and friends. He gave a brief update on his condition, saying, "Treatment is good, getting to deal with a lot of things that even the music didn't want to. I have not given up because you, my friends have not given up on me." The note concludes optimistically, saying that there were a few music projects on the "distant radar screen".

== Death and legacy ==
Molina died on March 16, 2013, in Indianapolis of alcohol abuse-related organ failure. He was 39. His friend Henry Owings published an article in his online music magazine Chunklet that said Molina had struggled with alcoholism for most of the decade leading up to his death. Owings also wrote that Molina had "cashed out on Saturday night in Indianapolis with nothing but a cell phone in his pocket". Molina was cremated.

Following 2013, two posthumous 7-inch singles of Townes Van Zandt and Black Sabbath covers were released. In May 2013, Graveface Records released a double CD called Weary Engine Blues: A Tribute to Jason Molina. In 2015 Glen Hansard released a tribute EP It Was Triumph We Once Proposed…Songs of Jason Molina. Additionally, a biography of Molina, Jason Molina: Riding with the Ghost, was published in May 2017 by Erin Osmon. A plaque dedicated in Molina's memory was erected on the entrance of Secretly Canadian's second storage facility. In January 2018, the indie label Dead Oceans published in homage to Molina the cooperation single Farewell Transmission b/w The Dark Don't Hide It by Kevin Morby and Waxahatchee. Two posthumous albums, Live at La Chapelle and Eight Gates, were released by Secretly Canadian in 2020. In July 2025, Run for Cover Records announced that a tribute album, I Will Swim To You: A Tribute To Jason Molina, would be released in September 2025. The track list includes covers by MJ Lenderman, Hand Habits, Horse Jumper of Love, Lutalo, and Sadurn, among others.

Many artists have cited Molina as an influence, including Kevin Morby, MJ Lenderman, the Avett Brothers, My Morning Jacket, Waxahatchee, Hiss Golden Messenger, Sadurn, Wild Pink, Fust, Sparky Deathcap and Squirrel Flower, among others.

== Artistry ==
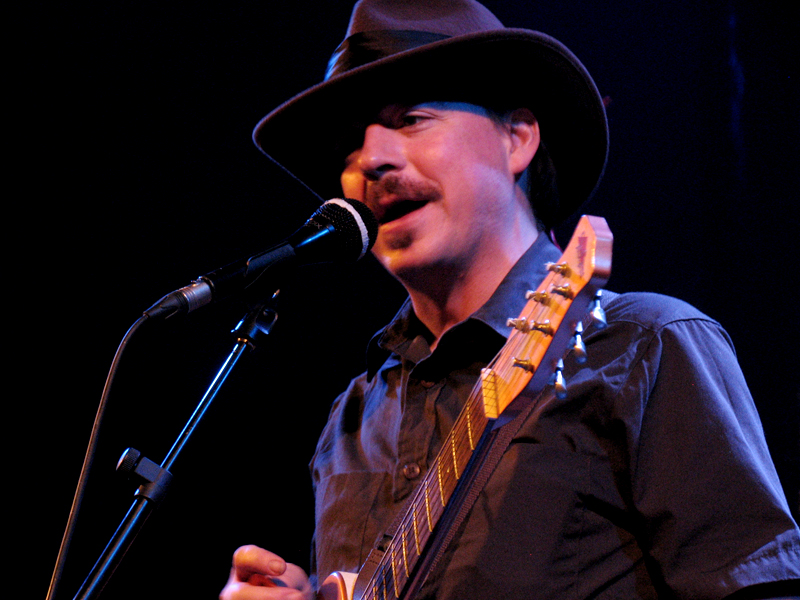
Molina performing in 2009

Music critics noted Molina's music for its unique blend of indie rock with blues, alternative country, and lo-fi music, which combined "Rust Belt grit with Americana music's pastoral imagery." The New York Times's William Yardley characterized Molina as a "balladeer of heartbreak". He possessed a tenor vocal range.

According to Molina, he treated his work as a musician like a standard job, writing music eight hours per day. "I throw away most of what I write", he said in a 2006 interview. "I feel a lot of guilt about the freedom that being an artist provides. I ask myself, 'Why am I not the guy emptying the trash, why am I the guy who is watching the guy empty the trash?'"

== Personal life ==
Molina was married to Darcie Schoenman Molina. They had no children and were estranged at the time of his death.

== Discography ==
All releases on the Secretly Canadian label, unless otherwise specified.

=== Songs: Ohia ===
Studio albums

- 1997: Songs: Ohia (also known as The Black Album)
- 1998: Impala (originally released on Happy Go Lucky)
- 1999: Axxess & Ace
- 1999: The Ghost
- 2000: The Lioness
- 2000: Ghost Tropic
- 2002: Didn't It Rain
- 2003: The Magnolia Electric Co.

Live albums

- 2001: Mi Sei Apparso Come Un Fantasma (Paper Cut Records)
- 2017: Live At WOBC October 12, 1994 (Secretly Canadian)
- 2022: Live: Vanquishers (Tilburg, Netherlands. Oct 9, 2000) (Secretly Canadian)

Tour-only releases

- 1999: The Ghost (tour-only release)
- 2000: Protection Spells (tour-only release)

EPs

- 1997: Hecla & Griper
- 1998: Our Golden Ratio (Acuarela)
- 2001: Howler (Absalom)
- 2001: Travels in Constants (Temporary Residence)

Singles

- 1996: "Nor Cease Thou Never Now" (Palace Records)
- 1996: "One Pronunciation of Glory"
- 1999: "Untitled" (Western Vinyl)
- 2002: "The Gray Tower"/"Black Link to Fire Link"
- 2002: "Keep It Steady"/"United or Lost Alone"
- 2004: "No Moon on the Water"/"In the Human World" (Chunklet)
- 2022: "VU Anxiety" (Secretly Canadian)

=== Jason Molina ===
Albums

- 2004: Pyramid Electric Co.
- 2006: Let Me Go, Let Me Go, Let Me Go
- 2012: Autumn Bird Songs (Graveface)
- 2020: Eight Gates

Live albums

- 2020: Live at La Chapelle (Secretly Canadian)

EPs

- 2012: Autumn Bird Songs

Singles

- 2004: No Moon On The Water
- 2016: The Townes Van Zandt Covers
- 2017: The Black Sabbath Covers

=== Magnolia Electric Co. ===
Albums

- 2005: Trials & Errors (live album)
- 2005: What Comes After the Blues
- 2006: Fading Trails
- 2007: Sojourner (boxset)
- 2009: Josephine

EPs

- 2005: Hard to Love a Man
- 2009: It's Made Me Cry

Singles

- 2009: Rider.Shadow.Wolf

=== Collaborations ===
Albums

- 2009: Molina and Johnson

EPs

- 2002: "Translation" on Split: My Morning Jacket / Songs: Ohia (Jade Tree)
- 2002: Amalgamated Sons of Rest with Will Oldham and Alasdair Roberts (Galaxia)

Singles

- 1998: "Nay, 'Tis Not Death" (Alternate) on split 7-inch with Appendix Out (Liquefaction Empire)
- 1999: "Journey On" on split 7-inch with Oneida (Jagjaguwar)
- 1999: "How to Be Perfect Men" on split 7-inch with Rex (Temporary Residence)
- 2000: 7-inch single with Alasdair Roberts
- 2000: "Fade St." on split 7-inch with Glen Hansard (Road Relish)
- 2001: "Lioness" (Version) on split 7-inch with Scout Niblett
