= Leave the City =

Leave the City may refer to:

- "Leave the City", a 2005 song by Magnolia Electric Co. from Trials & Errors
- "Leave the City", a 2018 song by Twenty One Pilots from Trench
