= The Magnolia Electric Co. =

2003 studio album by Songs: Ohia

- Cover art by William Schaff

Studio album by Songs: Ohia
- Released: March 4, 2003
- Recorded: Summer 2002
- Studios: Electrical Audio, Chicago
- Genres: Alternative country; Americana; Country rock; Heartland rock
- Length: 45:06
- Label: Secretly Canadian
- Producer: Steve Albini

Songs: Ohia chronology
Didn't It Rain (2002)	The Magnolia Electric Co. (2003)	Trials & Errors (2005)

The Magnolia Electric Co. is the seventh and final studio album by the American band Songs: Ohia, released by Secretly Canadian on March 4, 2003. It was recorded live over three days in the summer of 2002 by Steve Albini at Electrical Audio in Chicago. The album draws on alternative country, country rock and 1970s outlaw country, and has also been described as a defining heartland rock record. Because it shares its name with the band Jason Molina formed after its release, Magnolia Electric Co., its place in Molina's discography has been the subject of debate.

The album was acclaimed on release and again on its 2013 tenth-anniversary reissue.

== Background and title ==
The title of the album and comments by Jason Molina have led to discussion over whether it is also the debut album of Molina's subsequent band, Magnolia Electric Co.

The album's artwork does not contain the name Songs: Ohia. However, it was recorded with different musicians from the later Magnolia Electric Co. lineup, and Secretly Canadian has described it as the last Songs: Ohia LP, after which the band's Bloomington-based touring members became an official lineup under the new name. The change of name was not announced until the tour that followed the album's release in spring 2003. Former bandmate Jason Groth recalled that Molina named the record after the magnolia trees he kept noticing while traveling through the American South, which struck him as resilient yet beautiful. Molina later described Didn't It Rain (2002) as the final Songs: Ohia album, and The Magnolia Electric Co. as the first album by his new band.

== Recording ==
In the summer of 2002, about four months after the release of Didn't It Rain, Molina gathered friends and bandmates at Electrical Audio in Chicago to record the album with Steve Albini. When announcing the sessions, Molina said he was aiming for a 1950s-inspired sound, with old echo techniques on the vocals, doo-wop backing singers and dirty guitars, recorded live as much as possible. The album was recorded live in its entirety, with the same core backing band that had played on the Italian live album Mi Sei Apparso Come un Fantasma.

According to Erin Osmon's biography Jason Molina: Riding with the Ghost, the album was tracked in three days by musicians who were playing the songs for the first time; the opener "Farewell Transmission" was recorded in a single take after one quick run-through of the chords. Molina sang lead on six of the eight songs, with Jennie Benford as his main backing vocalist; Chicago country singer Lawrence Peters sang lead on "The Old Black Hen" and Scout Niblett on "Peoria Lunch Box Blues".

== Composition ==
The Magnolia Electric Co. explores alt-country and what Pitchfork called "red-blood, full-throated" country rock. Paste wrote that the band drew on both "orthodox" Americana and "otherworldly atmosphere". The album also incorporates roots rock, while its arrangements and songwriting recall 1970s outlaw country. In her 2026 book Won't Back Down, Erin Osmon called it "one of counterculture's most celebrated and defining heartland rock offerings".

== Release ==
Secretly Canadian released the album on March 4, 2003, with the catalog number SC076.

Following Molina's death in March 2013, Secretly Canadian issued a tenth-anniversary deluxe edition on November 12, 2013 (November 25 in Europe). It added a second disc of Molina's demos for the album and two studio outtakes: "Whip Poor Will", a song later re-recorded for Magnolia Electric Co.'s final album Josephine (2009), and "The Big Game Is Every Night", previously available only on the Japanese edition. The double-LP version includes the two outtakes on a 10-inch single.

== Critical reception ==
Professional ratings
Aggregate scores
Source	Rating
Metacritic	85/100
Review scores
Source	Rating
AllMusic	4/5 stars
The Boston Phoenix	3.5/4 stars
Consequence of Sound	5/5 stars
The Independent	5/5 stars
Mojo	4/5 stars
Now	4/5 Ns
Pitchfork	8.2/10 (2003); 9.0/10 (2013)
PopMatters	9/10
Record Collector	4/5 stars
Uncut	4/5 stars

The Magnolia Electric Co. received critical acclaim. At Metacritic, which assigns a normalized rating out of 100 to reviews from professional critics, the album has an average score of 85, indicating "universal acclaim". Pitchfork gave the original release a score of 8.2 out of 10, and raised it to 9.0 when reviewing the 2013 reissue. Consequence of Sound and The Independent both awarded the reissue five out of five.

Consequence of Sound singled out the reissue's previously Japan-only bonus track "The Big Game Is Every Night", a nearly ten-minute song, and noted that the stripped-down demos recalled the bare quality of early Songs: Ohia.

=== Accolades ===
In 2016, Paste ranked the album 25th on its list of the 50 best alt-country albums of all time.

== Legacy ==
The Magnolia Electric Co. is widely regarded as Molina's masterpiece and his most popular album. In a 2023 retrospective marking the album's 20th anniversary, Stereogum's Chris DeVille named it the best album of 2003 and one of the greatest albums of all time. He also noted its influence on later artists, including MJ Lenderman, and covers of its songs by Amanda Shires and by Kevin Morby with Waxahatchee.

Molina died in March 2013 of organ failure caused by alcoholism, and his reputation has grown considerably since then. Steven Hyden of Uproxx wrote that public perception of Molina's large catalog tends to be reduced to the album's opening track, "Farewell Transmission", which has become a widely covered indie-rock standard. He also traced Molina's influence to a younger generation of indie and Americana artists, among them Big Thief, Wednesday, Strand of Oaks and Lenderman. The 2014 tribute album Farewell Transmission: The Music of Jason Molina took its name from the song.

== Track listing ==
All tracks are written by Jason Molina.

No.	Title	Length
1.	"Farewell Transmission"	7:22
2.	"I've Been Riding with the Ghost"	3:20
3.	"Just Be Simple"	4:20
4.	"Almost Was Good Enough"	4:28
5.	"The Old Black Hen"	5:48
6.	"Peoria Lunch Box Blues"	5:48
7.	"John Henry Split My Heart"	6:09
8.	"Hold On Magnolia"	7:51
Total length:		45:06

=== 10th Anniversary Deluxe Edition (2013) ===
The 2013 CD reissue adds two studio outtakes to the first disc and a second disc of Molina's home demos. On the double-LP version, the two outtakes appear on a separate 10-inch single.

All tracks are written by Jason Molina.

Disc one – bonus tracks
No.	Title	Length
9.	"The Big Game Is Every Night" (previously on the Japanese edition)
10.	"Whip Poor Will" (previously unreleased)

All tracks are written by Jason Molina.

Disc two – demos
No.	Title	Length
1.	"Farewell Transmission" (demo)
2.	"I've Been Riding with the Ghost" (demo)
3.	"Just Be Simple" (demo)
4.	"The Old Black Hen" (demo)
5.	"Peoria Lunch Box Blues" (demo)
6.	"John Henry Split My Heart" (demo)
7.	"Hold On Magnolia" (demo)
8.	"The Big Game Is Every Night" (demo)
9.	"Whip Poor Will" (demo)

== Personnel ==
Credits adapted from the album's liner notes.

Musicians

- Jason Molina – vocals, guitar
- Jennie Benford – vocals, mandolin
- Mike Brenner – lap steel guitar
- Jim "Three Nickel" Grabowski – piano, organ, Wurlitzer
- Dan MacAdam – guitar, vocals, violin
- Dan Sullivan – guitar
- Rob Sullivan – bass
- Jeff Panall – drums
- Lawrence Peters – vocals on "The Old Black Hen"
- Scout Niblett – vocals on "Peoria Lunch Box Blues"

Technical

- Steve Albini – recording engineer
- William Schaff – cover art
