= Mi Sei Apparso Come Un Fantasma =

Live album by Songs: Ohia
- Released: September 15, 2001
- Genre: Indie rock, alt-country
- Label: Paper Cup

Songs: Ohia chronology
Ghost Tropic (2000)	Mi Sei Apparso Come Un Fantasma (2001)	Didn't It Rain (2002)

Professional ratings
Review scores
Source	Rating
Allmusic	3/5 stars
Pitchfork Media	(8.4)
Q	(favourable)
The Wire	(magazine)

Mi Sei Apparso Come Un Fantasma (English: You Came to Me as a Ghost) is a live album by Songs: Ohia. It was recorded at Barchessone Vecchio in Modena, Italy on September 27, 2000. The album received mixed reviews, with a Metacritic score of 60. While Pitchfork Media wrote that the album "...offers a better introduction to Songs: Ohia than the last couple of proper albums, which seemed like transitional or exploratory releases", The Wire's reviewer was underwhelmed, feeling that the disc "[s]till sounds like the work of someone desperate to gain the approval of the Drag City clique".

== Track listing ==
All songs written by Jason Molina.

1. untitled (Are We Getting Any Closer?)
2. untitled (Nobody Tries That Hard Anymore)
3. "Tigress"
4. "Being in Love"
5. untitled (Constant Change)
6. untitled (It Won't Be Easy)
7. untitled (She Came to Me as a Ghost)
8. "Cabwaylingo"
- Titles in parentheses for untitled songs taken from the Magnolia Electric Co. website.

== Recording information ==
- Jason Molina - guitar, vocals
- Dan Sullivan - guitar
- Dan MacAdam - bass
- Jeff Panall - drums
