= Pyramid Electric Co. =

Studio album by Jason Molina
- Released: 2004
- Recorded: 2001
- Genre: Folk
- Length: 41:31
- Label: Secretly Canadian
- Producer: Mike Mogis

Jason Molina chronology
Pyramid Electric Co. (2004)	Let Me Go, Let Me Go, Let Me Go (2006)

Professional ratings
Aggregate scores
Source	Rating
Metacritic	82/100
Review scores
Source	Rating
Cokemachineglow	81%
Filter	85%
Mojo	4/5 stars
Now	4/5 stars
Pitchfork	6.9/10
Stylus	9/10
Tiny Mix Tapes	4/5 stars

Pyramid Electric Co. is the first full-length solo album by Jason Molina, released in 2004 on Secretly Canadian Records. It was recorded by Mike Mogis and received universal critical acclaim according to Metacritic (with an 81 aggregate score). While critics found it hard going: "Pyramid is not Songs: Ohia but the musical equivalent of A Season in Hell, not something one can take in often, but which is beautiful for the fact that it was completed at all", they also commented on the sincerity of the delivery: "The delivery is too matter-of-fact, too genuine to evoke pity or sadness. It is lethargic, yet not dreary — it grabs you violently and lays you down so, so gently." An unusual feature of the album was that it was released as a vinyl LP only, but each copy also contains the CD version of the album in miniaturized artwork.

== Track listing ==
1. Pyramid Electric Co. – 8:49
2. Red Comet Dust – 5:05
3. Division St. Girl – 5:42
4. Honey, Watch Your Ass – 7:25
5. Song of the Road – 4:35
6. Spectral Alphabet – 3:12
7. Long Desert Train – 6:39
