= Farewell Transmission =

2003 song by Songs: Ohia

Song by Songs: Ohia

from the album The Magnolia Electric Co.
- Released: March 4, 2003
- Recorded: Summer 2002
- Studio: Electrical Audio, Chicago
- Genre: Alternative country; Country rock; Roots rock
- Length: 7:22
- Label: Secretly Canadian
- Songwriter: Jason Molina
- Producer: Steve Albini

The Magnolia Electric Co. track listing
- The Magnolia Electric Co. track listing: 1. "Farewell Transmission"; 2. "I've Been Riding with the Ghost"; 3. "Just Be Simple"; 4. "Almost Was Good Enough"; 5. "The Old Black Hen"; 6. "Peoria Lunch Box Blues"; 7. "John Henry Split My Heart"; 8. "Hold On Magnolia"

"Farewell Transmission" is a song written by Jason Molina and recorded by his band Songs: Ohia. It is the opening track of the band's seventh and final studio album, The Magnolia Electric Co., released by Secretly Canadian on March 4, 2003. The song grew out of a demo titled "Long Dark Blues" and was recorded live in a single take with producer Steve Albini at Electrical Audio in Chicago.

Though never a commercial hit, "Farewell Transmission" is widely regarded as Molina's signature song, and critics have called it his greatest. After Molina's death in 2013 it became a frequently covered indie-rock standard, recorded by My Morning Jacket, Glen Hansard, and Kevin Morby with Waxahatchee, among others. It also lent its name to the 2014 tribute album Farewell Transmission: The Music of Jason Molina.

== Background and recording ==
Molina wrote the song under the working title "Long Dark Blues"; his demo of it would eventually develop into the album version of "Farewell Transmission".

In the summer of 2002, Molina assembled a large group of friends and bandmates at Electrical Audio to record The Magnolia Electric Co. with Steve Albini. The album was recorded live in its entirety. According to Erin Osmon's biography Jason Molina: Riding with the Ghost, the musicians were playing the songs for the first time, and "Farewell Transmission" was captured in one take after only a brief run-through of its chord progression.

== Composition ==
"Farewell Transmission" runs seven minutes and twenty-two seconds and opens with a slide guitar figure before building into what Stereogum described as a slow-motion wave of drums and guitars, with a choir of backing vocalists chanting the phrase "long dark blues". Steven Hyden of Uproxx compared it to a classic-rock concert anthem and noted the band's freewheeling intensity, the product of Molina's preference for live takes and his habit of rotating backing musicians.

Lyrically, the song depicts an apocalyptic landscape of falling stars and approaching midnight. Writing for Cover Me, Matt Vadnais argued that, although the song is easily heard in hindsight as a premonition of Molina's death, it is less a prophecy of doom than a portrait of grim endurance; its images of an ending are repeatedly undercut by exhortations to keep trying.

== Critical reception and legacy ==
Stereogum has described "Farewell Transmission" as arguably Molina's greatest song, and in a 20th-anniversary retrospective on the album, Chris DeVille called it a song that "sets the rest of an album up for failure". Matt Vadnais of Cover Me called it arguably Molina's most important recording.

In a 2025 overview of Molina's career, Hyden wrote that the public perception of Molina's large catalog tends to be reduced to this one song, which he likened to a "Free Bird" for the DIY basement-show scene and called a modern indie-rock standard.

A demo version of the song was included on the tenth-anniversary deluxe reissue of The Magnolia Electric Co. in November 2013, and was released ahead of the reissue in October 2013.

== Cover versions ==
- My Morning Jacket recorded the song for the two-disc tribute album Farewell Transmission: The Music of Jason Molina, released by the nonprofit label Rock the Cause on April 22, 2014. The album, which takes its title from the song, also features covers by Wooden Wand, Murder by Death, Sarah Jaffe and others.
- Glen Hansard included the song on his 2015 tribute EP It Was Triumph We Once Proposed... Songs of Jason Molina, reshaping it with soft-to-loud crescendos. Paste placed Hansard's version at number 10 on its list of the best cover songs of 2015.
- John Vanderslice covered the original demo, "Long Dark Blues", in 2015.
- Kevin Morby and Katie Crutchfield of Waxahatchee released a cover in 2018, paired with Magnolia Electric Co.'s "The Dark Don't Hide It".
- Vundabar released a home-recorded cover in April 2020.
- Julien Baker and Torres performed the song live at the Mercury Lounge in New York in December 2024.
