= Protection Spells =

Studio album by Songs: Ohia
- Released: 2000
- Genre: Indie rock, alt-country
- Label: Secretly Canadian

Songs: Ohia chronology
Axxess & Ace (1999)	Protection Spells (2000)	The Lioness (2000)

Professional ratings
Review scores
Source	Rating
AllMusic	4/5 stars
The Encyclopedia of Popular Music	3/5 stars

Protection Spells is a tour-only album by Songs: Ohia. It is a collection of 9 improvised pieces recorded by Jason Molina whilst on tour in 1999. It was limited to 500 copies and released by Secretly Canadian in 2000.

== Track listing ==
All songs written by Jason Molina.

1. "Trouble Will Find You"
2. "The Moon Undoes It All"
3. "Darkness That Strong"
4. "Keep Only One of Us Free"
5. "The World at the End of the World"
6. "Fire on the Shore"
7. "Mighty Like Love, Mighty Like Sorrow"
8. "The One Red Star"
9. "Whenever I Have Done a Thing in Flames"

== Credits ==
- Jason Molina
- Joseph Brumley
- Daniel Burton
- Jonathan Cargill
- Chris Carothers
- Geof Comings
- Dave Fischoff
- Rory Leitch
- Microtec
- June Panic
- Alasdair Roberts
- Jochem Schouten
- Ben Swanson
- Chris Swanson
- Richard Youngs
