= Impala (disambiguation) =

An impala is an African antelope.

Impala or IMPALA may also refer to:

== Arts ==
=== Music ===
- Impala (album), an album by Songs: Ohia
- The Impalas, an American 1950s doo-wop group
- Independent Music Companies Association, European trade association for independent record labels, known as IMPALA
- Tame Impala, an Australian music project
- The Jewels, formerly the Impalas, a girl group

=== Media ===
- Impala (DC Comics), a superhero in the DC Comics universe
- Impala (Marvel Comics), a supervillain in the Marvel Comics universe

== Sport ==
- Impala Saracens, a Kenyan rugby club based in Nairobi, Kenya
- Impalas (cricket team), a cricket team representing minor South African provinces

== Other ==
- 1320 Impala, an asteroid
- Apache Impala, a modern SQL query engine for Apache Hadoop
- Chevrolet Impala, an automobile produced by General Motors
- Impala, a Spanish motorcycle manufactured by Montesa
- Impala SAS, a French company

== See also ==
- Impaler (disambiguation)
