= Didn't It Rain (Songs: Ohia album) =

Studio album by Songs: Ohia
- Released: March 5, 2002
- Genre: Indie rock, folk rock, alt-country, blues
- Length: 43:25
- Label: Secretly Canadian
- Producer: Edan Cohen

Songs: Ohia chronology
Mi Sei Apparso Come Un Fantasma (2001)	Didn't It Rain (2002)	The Magnolia Electric Co. (2003)

Professional ratings
Aggregate scores
Source	Rating
Metacritic	85/100
Review scores
Source	Rating
AllMusic	4.5/5 stars
Alternative Press	4.5/5 stars
Drowned in Sound	10/10
Mojo	4/5 stars
NME	8/10
Pitchfork	8.4/10 (2002); 8.8/10 (2014)
Uncut	9/10

Didn't It Rain is the sixth regular album by American musician Songs: Ohia.

The album is named after "Didn't It Rain", a traditional song popularized by Sister Rosetta Tharpe in 1948 and Mahalia Jackson in 1954. Written and published by Henry Thacker Burleigh (1866 - 1949).

It was recorded by Edan Cohen at Soundgun Studios in Philadelphia and released by Secretly Canadian on March 5, 2002. The Metacritic website gave the album a composite rating of 85, ranking it thirteenth among the best albums of 2002.

== Track listing ==
All songs written by Jason Molina.

1. "Didn't It Rain" — 7:49
2. "Steve Albini's Blues" — 5:51
3. "Ring the Bell" — 6:11
4. "Cross the Road, Molina" — 6:00
5. "Blue Factory Flame" — 8:29
6. "Two Blue Lights" — 2:14
7. "Blue Chicago Moon" — 6:49

The 2014 Re-release included an extra disc of demos:

1. "Didn't It Rain" — 6:57
2. "Ring the Bell", Working Title: "Depression No. 42" — 6:48
3. "Cross the Road, Molina", Working Title: "Chicago City Moon" — 5:03
4. "Blue Factory Flame" — 8:20
5. "Two Blue Lights" — 3:03
6. "Blue Chicago Moon" — 6:32
7. "The Gray Tour", Working Title: "Waiting It's Whole Life" (Later Re-Recorded for The Grey Tower 7") — 4:28
8. "Spectral Alphabet" (Later Re-Recorded for Pyramid Electric Co.) — 5:05

== Recording information ==
Didn't It Rain was recorded as a live studio album.

- Jason Molina
- Jennie Benford
- Mike Brenner
- Jim Krewson
- Recorded by Edan Cohen

The album title is a reference to the song of the same name by Sister Rosetta Tharpe.
