= Axxess & Ace =

Studio album by Songs: Ohia
- Released: March 15, 1999
- Genre: Indie rock, alt-country
- Label: Secretly Canadian
- Producer: Michael Krassner

Songs: Ohia chronology
The Ghost (1999)	Axxess & Ace (1999)	Protection Spells (2000)

Professional ratings
Review scores
Source	Rating
AllMusic	4.5/5 stars
Pitchfork	8.0/10

Axxess & Ace is the third album by Songs: Ohia. It was recorded by Michael Krassner at Truckstop Studios in Chicago, Illinois, United States, and released by Secretly Canadian on March 15, 1999.

== Track listing ==
All songs written by Jason Molina.

1. "Hot Black Silk" – 3:08
2. "Love & Work" – 3:34
3. "Love Leaves Its Abusers" – 3:47
4. "Redhead" – 4:19
5. "Captain Badass" – 7:40
6. "Come Back to Your Man" – 5:57
7. "Champion" – 2:39
8. "How to Be Perfect Men" – 4:04
9. "Goodnight Lover" – 6:58

== Recording information ==
- Jason Molina
- Geof Comings (Party Girls)
- Michael Krassner (the Lofty Pillars, Boxhead Ensemble, Edith Frost Band)
- Joe Ferguson (Pinetop Seven)
- Dave Pavkovic (Boxhead Ensemble)
- Julie Liu (Rex)
- Edith Frost
