= What Comes After the Blues =

Studio album by Magnolia Electric Co.
- Released: 2005
- Recorded: 2003
- Genre: alternative country, Folk rock, indie rock
- Length: 36:03
- Label: Secretly Canadian
- Producer: Steve Albini

Magnolia Electric Co. chronology
Trials & Errors (2005)	What Comes After the Blues (2005)	Fading Trails (2006)

Professional ratings
Aggregate scores
Source	Rating
Metacritic	74/100
Review scores
Source	Rating
AllMusic	3.5/5 stars
Pitchfork Media	6.4/10
Stylus Magazine	B−
Tiny Mix Tapes	4.5/5 stars

What Comes After the Blues is the first full-length recording by what became the Magnolia Electric Co. touring line-up, and the second album released by Jason Molina under that name. It was recorded in November 2003 by Steve Albini at his Electrical Audio studio in Chicago.

== Track listing ==
No.	Title	Writer(s)	Length
1.	"The Dark Don't Hide It"	Jason Molina	4:15
2.	"The Night Shift Lullaby"	Jennie Benford	4:33
3.	"Leave the City"	Jason Molina	4:28
4.	"Hard to Love a Man"	Jason Molina	4:18
5.	"Give Something Else Away Every Day"	Jason Molina	4:57
6.	"Northstar Blues"	Jason Molina	5:08
7.	"Hammer Down"	Jason Molina	2:41
8.	"I Can Not Have Seen the Light"	Jason Molina	5:43

== Personnel ==
- Jason Molina - electric and acoustic guitar, vocals
- Jennie Benford - acoustic guitar, vocals
- Mike Brenner - steel guitar
- Jim Grabowski - piano, mellotron
- Jason Groth - electric and acoustic guitar, vocals
- Michael Kapinus - Wurlitzer, piano, trumpet, vocals
- Dan MacAdam - violin
- Mark Rice - drums
- Pete Schreiner - bass guitar
