= Edra Soto =

Stateside Puerto Rican fine artist

- Soto at the Obama Presidential Center, 2026
- Born: Edra Soto; 1971 (age 54–55); Puerto Rico
- Education: Escuela de Artes Plásticas y Diseño de Puerto Rico [BFA]; School of the Art Institute of Chicago [MFA]

Edra Soto (born 1971, Puerto Rico) is a Chicago-based multidisciplinary artist, curator, educator, and co-director of the artist-run outdoor project space The Franklin.

== Biography ==
Edra Soto was born in Puerto Rico in 1971. She received a Bachelor of Fine Arts degree from Escuela de Artes Plasticas de Puerto Rico in 1994. After moving to Chicago, she earned a Master of Fine Arts degree from the School of the Art Institute of Chicago in 2000. She has received several awards, including the Efroymson Contemporary Arts Fellowship (2016) and the Department of Cultural Affairs and Special Events (DCASE) Individual Artists Award (2017). She has curated numerous exhibitions, including co-curating Present Standard at the Chicago Cultural Center in 2016. She is a faculty member in the Contemporary Practices Department at The School of the Art Institute of Chicago. Her work has been exhibited in solo and group shows both nationally and internationally.

== The Franklin ==
In 2012, Soto and her husband Dan Sullivan founded The Franklin, an artist-run project space in the backyard of their home in Garfield Park, featuring installations and site-specific work by Chicago and national artists.

The Franklin Collection of over 200 artworks by local, national, and international artists is also at the Garfield Park location.

== Works ==
Soto's ongoing site-specific GRAFT series, begun in 2013, incorporates the geometric designs of iron rejas screens popular throughout Puerto Rico. In 2014, Soto and Dan Sullivan were awarded a public art commission from the Chicago Transit Authority (CTA) for the Blue Line Western Station. Their work will be a large-scale installation for the stationhouse exterior.

Edra Soto was an Artist-in-Residence at Institute of Contemporary Art San Diego, California, in 2023. In 2024, Soto received the Joyce Foundation award from the Sculpture Center in Cleveland, Ohio; and was selected by the New York Public Art Fund to present a project in Central Park. Her work was included in the group show Widening the Lens: Photography, Ecology, and the Contemporary Landscape at the Carnegie Museum of Art, Pittsburgh; and acquired by the Pérez Art Museum Miami, Florida.

== Personal life ==
Soto is married to Dan Sullivan, and the two are frequent creative collaborators.

== Exhibitions (selection) ==
- 2015 DOMINODOMINO, with Dan Sullivan, Morgan Lehman Gallery, New York, NY
- 2017 Manual GRAFT, University Galleries, Illinois State University, Normal IL
- 2017 OPEN 24 HOURS, Museum of Contemporary Art of Chicago
- 2017 Traduttore, Traditore, Gallery 400, Chicago
- 2019 Forgotten Forms, Chicago Cultural Center
- 2019 Cross Currents: Intercambio Cultural, Centro de Desarrollo de las Artes Visuales, Havana, Cuba and Smart Museum, Chicago (forthcoming)
- 2023 Edra Soto: Graft, Institute of Contemporary Art, San Diego, California
- 2024 Edra Soto: Graft, Central Park (as part of Public Art Fund's exhibition programming), New York
