= The Kingsbury Manx =

- Origin: Chapel Hill, North Carolina, United States
- Genres: Folk, indie rock
- Years active: 1999–present
- Labels: Overcoat Recordings; Yep Roc Odessa

The Kingsbury Manx is an American indie rock group from Chapel Hill, North Carolina, United States.

== History ==
The original members of The Kingsbury Manx met in middle school. They then attended different colleges and reunited during the summer months to play and record together. One of their demos caught the ear of Chicago-based label Overcoat Recordings, who issued their debut self-titled album in 2000. Despite little promotional effort from the label, the album became a cult success, including recognition in UK music magazine NME 's Top 50 of 2000. A second LP (Let You Down) followed in 2001 and a third album and EP (Aztec Discipline and Afternoon Owls) in 2003. The band has toured with many indie bands of note including The Sea and Cake, Gorky's Zygotic Mynci, Iron and Wine, The Pernice Brothers, The New Pornographers, Calexico, Stephen Malkmus, Clinic, Bonnie "Prince" Billy, and Brightblack Morning Light. Over the last few years, there have been a couple lineup changes with original members Kenneth Stephenson and Scott Myers leaving while adding Clarque Blomquist and Paul Finn. In 2005, the group split with Overcoat and signed to Yep Roc, who released The Fast Rise and Fall of the South. The album was mixed by Wilco's Mikael Jorgensen.

The band are currently on Odessa Records and released their fifth album Ascenseur Ouvert! on April 21, 2009, followed by a sixth, The Bronze Age on 5 March 2013.

== Members ==
Current

- Bill Taylor (guitar/vocals/various)
- Ryan Richardson (drums/vocals/bass/various)
- Clarque Blomquist (bass/drums/various/vocals)
- Paul Finn (keys/vocals/various)

Former

- Kenneth Stephenson (guitar/vocals)
- Scott Myers (bass/keyboards)

== Discography ==
- The Kingsbury Manx (Overcoat Recordings, 2000)
- Let You Down (Overcoat, 2001)
- Afternoon Owls EP (Overcoat, 2003)
- Aztec Discipline (Overcoat, 2003)
- The Fast Rise and Fall of the South (Yep Roc, 2005)
- Ascenseur Ouvert! (Odessa, 2009)
- The Bronze Age (Odessa, 2013)
