= Josephine (album) =

Studio album by Magnolia Electric Co.
- Released: July 21, 2009
- Recorded: 2008
- Genre: Indie rock
- Length: 46:44
- Label: Secretly Canadian
- Producers: Steve Albini, Magnolia Electric Co.

Magnolia Electric Co. chronology
Sojourner (2007)	Josephine (2009)

Professional ratings
Aggregate scores
Source	Rating
Metacritic	78/100
Review scores
Source	Rating
Drowned In Sound	8/10
Rockfeedback	link
Metro	4/5 stars
PopMatters	8/10 stars
Pitchfork	5.6/10
Planet Sound	8/10

Josephine is the third and final studio album by Magnolia Electric Co. For the recording of the album, the band teamed up with frequent collaborator Steve Albini at his Electrical Audio Studios in Chicago. The record was conceived as a tribute to late Magnolia Electric Co. bassist Evan Farrell, and took two weeks to write and record. Josephine would also be the penultimate album released during frontman Jason Molina's lifetime – the last being a collaboration with Will Johnson – before his death in 2013.

== Track listing ==
All tracks are written by Jason Molina

No.	Title	Length
1.	"O! Grace"	3:27
2.	"The Rock of Ages"	2:42
3.	"Josephine"	3:22
4.	"Shenandoah"	4:36
5.	"Whip-poor-will"	4:12
6.	"Song for Willie"	2:20
7.	"Hope Dies Last"	3:15
8.	"The Handing Down"	3:32
9.	"Map of the Falling Sky"	3:41
10.	"Little Sad Eyes"	4:13
11.	"Heartbreak at Ten Paces"	2:02
12.	"Knoxville Girl"	3:50
13.	"Shiloh"	4:10
14.	"An Arrow in the Gale"	1:20

== Personnel ==
Credits adapted from the liner notes of Josephine.

Magnolia Electric Co.

- Jason Molina – acoustic guitar, electric guitar, lead vocals
- Jason Groth – acoustic guitar, electric guitar, baritone guitar, saxophone, tambourine, backing vocals
- Pete Schreiner – acoustic guitar, electric guitar, baritone guitar, bass guitar, bells, tambourine, backing vocals
- Michael Kapinus – piano, electric piano, electric organ, mellotron, cornet, vibraphone, backing vocals
- Mark Rice – drums, organ, percussion, backing vocals

Additional musicians

- Mike Brenner – lap steel guitar, dobro
- Greg Norman – trombone
- Jonathan Cargill – backing vocals

Technical personnel

- Steve Albini – engineer
- Greg Norman – assistant engineer
