= The Fiery Margin =

Studio album by Alasdair Roberts
- Released: 13 September 2019
- Length: 39:04
- Label: Drag City

Alasdair Roberts chronology
What News (2018)	The Fiery Margin (2019)

Professional ratings
Aggregate scores
Source	Rating
Metacritic	80/100
Review scores
Source	Rating
AllMusic	3.5/5 stars
The Skinny	4/5 stars

The Fiery Margin is a studio album by Scottish musician Alasdair Roberts. It was released on 13 September 2019 by Drag City Records. Monorail record shop in Glasgow released an exclusive edition featuring a bonus CD, Where the East Toucheth the West, which includes live versions of five of the album's tracks, recorded at gigs in July 2019.

In October 2019, the Fiery Margin Tour was announced for Scotland and England.

"The Untrue Womb" is a version of the song appearing on the 2011 charity album by The Fruit Tree Foundation.

== Critical reception ==
The Fiery Margin was met with generally favorable reviews from critics. At Metacritic, which assigns a weighted average rating out of 100 to reviews from mainstream publications, this release received an average score of 80, based on 5 reviews.

== Track listing ==
No.	Title	Length
1.	"False Flesh"	4:16
2.	"The Evernew Tongue"	3:02
3.	"Europe"	5:06
4.	"Comments"	3:55
5.	"A Keen"	2:55
6.	"The Stranger With the Scythe"	3:33
7.	"Actore"	3:22
8.	"Common Clay"	4:26
9.	"Learning Is Eternal"	4:46
10.	"The Untrue Womb"	3:43
