= Let Me Go, Let Me Go, Let Me Go =

Studio album by Jason Molina
- Released: August 22, 2006
- Recorded: July 2004
- Genre: Folk
- Length: 34:20
- Label: Secretly Canadian
- Producer: Jim Zespy

Jason Molina chronology
Pyramid Electric Co. (2005)	Let Me Go, Let Me Go, Let Me Go (2006)

Professional ratings
Review scores
Source	Rating
AllMusic	4/5 stars
Pitchfork Media	(7.9/10)
Slant Magazine	2.5/5 stars

Let Me Go, Let Me Go, Let Me Go is the second full-length solo album by Jason Molina, released under his own name. It was recorded in Bloomington, Indiana, at The Projects by Jim Zespy during July 2004. The record was released on August 22, 2006, on Secretly Canadian Records.

== Track listing ==
1. "It's Easier Now" – 4:01
2. "Everything Should Try Again" – 4:15
3. "Alone With the Owl" – 2:24
4. "Don't It Look Like Rain" – 3:48
5. "Some Things Never Try" – 2:11
6. "It Must Be Raining There Forever" – 3:32
7. "Get Out Get Out Get Out" – 3:27
8. "It Costs You Nothing" – 3:59
9. "Let Me Go Let Me Go Let Me Go" – 6:39
