= My Morning Jacket/Songs: Ohia Split EP =

2002 split EP by My Morning Jacket and Songs: Ohia

My Morning Jacket / Songs: Ohia

EP (Split EP) by My Morning Jacket and Songs: Ohia
- Released: March 19, 2002
- Genres: Rock, Folk
- Length: 26:08
- Label: Jade Tree

My Morning Jacket chronology
At Dawn (2001)	My Morning Jacket / Songs: Ohia Split EP (2002)	Chocolate and Ice (2002)

Songs: Ohia chronology
Didn't It Rain (2002)	My Morning Jacket / Songs: Ohia Split EP (2002)	Magnolia Electric Co. (2003)

My Morning Jacket / Songs: Ohia is a split EP issued by Jade Tree in 2002.

== Reception ==
PopMatters noted, "All in all, this split EP acts as a good introduction to both bands," and Pitchfork rated it 8.5 out of ten.

== Track listing ==
Tracks 1, 2, 3, and 4 by My Morning Jacket. Track 5 by Songs: Ohia.

1. "O Is the One That Is Real" (Jim James) – 3:39
2. "How Do You Know" (Jim James) – 4:48
3. "Come Closer" (Jim James) – 4:59
4. "The Year in Review" (Jim James) – 2:34
5. "Translation" (A.S.of R.) – 10:08
