= Sojourner (album) =

Box set by Magnolia Electric Co.
- Released: 2007
- Recorded: 2005–2007
- Genre: Alt-country
- Length: 119:15
- Label: Secretly Canadian
- Producers: Steve Albini; David Lowery; Jason Molina

Magnolia Electric Co. chronology
Fading Trails (2005)	Sojourner (2007)	Josephine (2009)

Professional ratings
Aggregate scores
Source	Rating
Metacritic	82/100
Review scores
Source	Rating
AllMusic	4.5/5 stars
Cokemachineglow	68%
Mojo	4/5 stars
Pitchfork	7.7/10
PopMatters	8/10
Spin	6/10
Stylus	B
Uncut	4/5 stars
Under the Radar	7/10

Sojourner is Magnolia Electric Co.'s 2007 box-set release, comprising: three full-length albums, one four-song EP, one documentary movie on DVD called The Road Becomes What You Leave; a celestial map and a medallion; all within a wooden box. The band's 2006 album, Fading Trails, was compiled from the four recording sessions included in their entirety on Sojourner.

== Track listings ==
=== Nashville Moon ===
(Produced by Steve Albini)

1. "Lonesome Valley"
2. "Montgomery"
3. "Don't Fade on Me"
4. "Hammer Down"
5. "No Moon on the Water"
6. "Nashville Moon"
7. "What Comes After the Blues"
8. "Don't This Look Like the Dark"
9. "North Star"
10. "Bowery"
11. "Texas 71"
12. "Down the Wrong Road Both Ways"

=== Black Ram ===
(Produced by David Lowery)

1. "In the Human World"
2. "The Black Ram"
3. "What's Broken Becomes Better"
4. "Will-O-the-Wisp"
5. "Kanawha"
6. "A Little at a Time"
7. "Blackbird"
8. "And the Moon Hits the Water"
9. "The Old Horizon"

=== Sun Session ===
(Engineered by James Lott)

1. "Talk to Me Devil, Again"
2. "Memphis Moon"
3. "Hold on Magnolia"
4. "Trouble in Mind"

=== Shohola ===
(Recorded by Jason Molina)

1. "Steady Now"
2. "Spanish Moon Fall and Rise"
3. "Night Country"
4. "Shiloh Temple Bell"
5. "The Spell"
6. "Take One Thing Along"
7. "The Lamb's Song"
8. "Roll the Wheel"
1. One Thin Dime (iTunes bonus track)
2. Lonesome Valley (Alternate) (iTunes bonus track)
