= Fading Trails =

Studio album by Magnolia Electric Co.
- Released: 2006
- Recorded: 2005–2006
- Genre: Indie rock
- Length: 28:24
- Label: Secretly Canadian
- Producer: Steve Albini

Magnolia Electric Co. chronology
What Comes After the Blues (2005)	Fading Trails (2006)	Sojourner (2007)

Professional ratings
Aggregate scores
Source	Rating
Metacritic	73/100
Review scores
Source	Rating
AllMusic	4/5 stars
Pitchfork Media	(7.4/10)
PopMatters	5/10 stars
Slant Magazine	4/5 stars

Fading Trails is the second studio album by Magnolia Electric Co., a project of indie musician Jason Molina. It is a compilation of tracks from four different recording sessions, including recordings at Electrical Audio in Chicago, engineered by Steve Albini, Sound of Music Studio in Richmond, Virginia, produced by David Lowery, and Sun Studios in Memphis, Tennessee, engineered by James Lott. All of Fading Trails' songs are featured on the boxset Sojourner.

== Track listing ==
1. "Don't Fade on Me" – 4:15
2. "Montgomery" – 1:48
3. "Lonesome Valley" – 3:36
4. "A Little at a Time" – 3:05
5. "The Old Horizon" – 3:13
6. "Memphis Moon" – 3:16
7. "Talk to Me Devil, Again" – 3:28
8. "Spanish Moon Fall and Rise" – 2:44
9. "Steady Now" – 2:53
