= Songs: Ohia (album) =

Studio album by Songs: Ohia
- Released: April 1, 1997
- Genre: Indie rock, Alt-country
- Label: Secretly Canadian

Songs: Ohia chronology
Songs: Ohia (1997)	Impala (1998)

Professional ratings
Review scores
Source	Rating
AllMusic	4/5 stars

Songs: Ohia (also known as The Black Album) is the debut studio album by Songs: Ohia. It was released by Secretly Canadian on April 1, 1997.

== Track listing ==
All songs written by Jason Molina. The writings on the cover of the album are not the titles of the songs but are included here in parentheses for completeness.

1. "Vanquisher" (Cabwaylingo) – 2:19
2. "Oriole" (Crab Orchard) – 3:18
3. "(G+T) Constant" (Gauley Bridge) – 2:07
4. "Sin & Death" (Blue Jay) – 1:41
5. "Citadel" (Tenskwatawa) – 3:04
6. "930" (White Sulfur) – 2:48
7. "Republic" (Our Republic) – 3:16
8. "Texas" (Big Sewell Mt.) – 4:43
9. "One" (Cotton Hill) – 1:39
10. "Sailor" (Dogwood Gap) – 2:37
11. "Fortunate Man" (Little Beaver) – 2:07
12. "Runs For It" (Blue Stone) – 2:17
13. "Hayfoot" (U.M.W. Pension) – 3:24

The vinyl edition of the album also contains "For You" (Greenbrier) between Dogwood Gap & Little Beaver.
