= Overcoat Recordings =

Overcoat Recordings is an American record label specializing in alt country and indie rock music. It is based in Chicago, Illinois, and its owner is Howard Greynolds, who was formerly an employee of Thrill Jockey.

== Artists who have released material on Overcoat Recordings ==
- Richard Buckner
- Calexico with Iron and Wine
- Catalystics & Confessionals
- The Duck Boat Series
- Nicolai Dunger
- The Frames
- GoGoGo Airheart
- Glen Hansard & Marketa Irglova
- Micah P. Hinson
- Jim & Jennie and the Pinetops
- Kingsbury Manx
- Knife in the Water
- Pit Er Pat
- Sparrow
- The Swell Season
- Tortoise with Bonnie Prince Billy

== See also ==
- List of record labels
