= Impaler =

An impaler is a person who inflicts impalement.

Impaler may also refer to:

== People ==
- The Impaler, nickname of Jonathon Sharkey (born 1964), American professional wrestler and politician
- Vlad the Impaler (1431–c. 1476), posthumous name given to Vlad III, Prince of Wallachia

== Entertainment ==
- Impaler (band), horror punk band from Minnesota
- Lex the Impaler, American pornographic film series starring Lexington Steele
- Nikos the Impaler, 2003 American splatter film
- "Impaler", a song by Sabaton from the 2025 album Legends

== Sports ==
- Impaler, the finishing move of professional wrestler Gangrel

== See also ==
- Impala (disambiguation)
