= Songs: Ohia =

American indie rock band led by Jason Molina

- Origin: Ohio, U.S.
- Genres: Alternative country; indie rock; indie folk; slowcore
- Years active: 1996–2003
- Labels: Secretly Canadian; Palace
- Spinoffs: Magnolia Electric Co.
- Past members: Jason Molina

Songs: Ohia was an American indie rock and alt-country band led by singer-songwriter Jason Molina, active from 1996 to 2003. Molina was the only constant member; he recorded and toured with a constantly changing group of collaborators. After a debut single on Will Oldham's Palace label, the project became the flagship act of the Bloomington, Indiana, label Secretly Canadian, which released all of its albums.

Songs: Ohia's early records were spare and raw, drawing frequent comparisons to Oldham. The project's sound broadened over seven studio albums, from the Arab Strap collaboration The Lioness (2000) through the hushed Didn't It Rain (2002) to the full-band country rock of The Magnolia Electric Co. (2003). In 2003 Molina retired the name and continued as Magnolia Electric Co. He died in 2013, and his work as Songs: Ohia has since gained a substantially larger audience.

== History ==
=== Formation and early releases (1996–1999) ===
Molina grew up in Lorain, Ohio, and played bass in heavy metal bands around Cleveland before turning to indie rock and performing solo. As a student at Oberlin College, he recorded songs onto cassettes labeled with the prefix "Songs:" followed by a word describing their sound, among them Songs: Albian, Songs: Radix and Songs: Unitas, which he sold at local shows. Friends passed one tape, Songs: Ohia, to Will Oldham at a Palace Brothers show in Cleveland; Oldham suggested Molina use the name for the project, and it stuck. The name was taken from a phonetic rendering of the word "Ohio".

In 1996 Palace released the single "Nor Cease Thou Never Now", the first official Songs: Ohia release. Secretly Canadian, then a small label in Bloomington, released the debut album Songs: Ohia (often called "the Black Album") and the Hecla & Griper EP in 1997, followed by Impala in 1998. These early records drew constant comparisons to Oldham for their sparse production and Molina's plain, untrained voice.

Axxess & Ace (1999) was recorded in just over two days. Its critical success allowed Molina to tour and record full-time, usually alone or with local pick-up bands, partly because a full touring band was too expensive.

=== The Lioness to Didn't It Rain (2000–2002) ===
On the European tour for Axxess & Ace, Molina was joined by Alasdair Roberts of Appendix Out and Aidan Moffat of the Scottish band Arab Strap. Members of Arab Strap played on The Lioness, released in January 2000, which moved away from Molina's sparse acoustic style toward the band's analog-electronic sound. Ghost Tropic and the compilation Protection Spells followed the same year. Molina later collaborated with Oldham and Roberts as Amalgamated Sons of Rest.

Didn't It Rain (2002) was largely recorded in single takes with a group of Molina's musician friends over a few days. Stereogum wrote that it took his hushed balladry to a minimalist extreme.

=== The Magnolia Electric Co. and the end of Songs: Ohia (2002–2003) ===
In the summer of 2002, about four months after Didn't It Rain was released, Molina gathered friends and bandmates at Steve Albini's Electrical Audio studio in Chicago and recorded The Magnolia Electric Co., a loud, full-band country-rock record unlike anything he had made before. Released in March 2003, it received the strongest critical response of Molina's career.

The album was the last released under the Songs: Ohia name. Afterwards, the band's touring members became an official lineup under the name Magnolia Electric Co. Molina later said he considered Didn't It Rain the final Songs: Ohia album, and The Magnolia Electric Co. the new band's first. He had wanted the band format partly to take the focus off himself and give his players more credit.

=== After Songs: Ohia ===
Molina recorded as Magnolia Electric Co. and under his own name until 2009, when his alcoholism forced him to cancel a tour and enter rehab. He died in Indianapolis in March 2013, at age 39, of organ failure related to alcohol use.

After his death, Secretly Canadian began a series of reissues. The Hecla & Griper EP was reissued in 2013, followed in November 2013 by a tenth-anniversary deluxe edition of The Magnolia Electric Co. with a disc of Molina's demos and two outtakes. In November 2018 the label released Love & Work: The Lioness Sessions, a box set pairing The Lioness with eleven unreleased recordings: seven outtakes from the Scotland sessions and four songs recorded weeks earlier in London.

== Musical style ==
Songs: Ohia's early work was spare, raw folk and indie rock. Molina later described his working-class upbringing as shaping every word he wrote. Stereogum described his pre-Magnolia records as peculiar folk-rock with traces of slowcore and post-hardcore, raw and quiet even when loud. Molina's heroes included Neil Young; he had his band study After the Gold Rush before recording Didn't It Rain.

Molina favored live takes and spontaneity over overdubs, and rotated musicians so that some combinations of players backed him only once. His lyrics drew on downbeat small-town life, ghosts, and his lifelong fascination with American history, folklore and nature.

== Legacy ==
Molina's catalog sold modestly in his lifetime. Since his death he has come to be seen as a cult hero for a younger generation of indie and Americana musicians, among them Big Thief, Wednesday, Strand of Oaks and MJ Lenderman. The Magnolia Electric Co. is widely regarded as his masterpiece, and its opening track, "Farewell Transmission", has become an indie-rock standard, covered by My Morning Jacket, Glen Hansard, and Kevin Morby with Waxahatchee, among others.

== Members ==
Songs: Ohia had no fixed lineup. Molina was its only permanent member. Collaborators on its records included:

- Jason Molina – vocals, guitar (1996–2003)
- Jennie Benford – vocals, mandolin
- Alasdair Roberts
- Members of Arab Strap, including Aidan Moffat
- Scout Niblett – vocals on The Magnolia Electric Co.

== Discography ==
All released by Secretly Canadian unless noted.

=== Studio albums ===
- Songs: Ohia (1997)
- Impala (1998)
- Axxess & Ace (1999)
- The Lioness (2000)
- Ghost Tropic (2000)
- Didn't It Rain (2002)
- The Magnolia Electric Co. (2003)

=== EPs and compilations ===
- Hecla & Griper (EP, 1997)
- Protection Spells (2000)
- My Morning Jacket/Songs: Ohia Split EP (split EP with My Morning Jacket, 2002)

=== Singles ===
- "Nor Cease Thou Never Now" (Palace, 1996)

=== Reissues ===
- The Magnolia Electric Co. – 10th Anniversary Deluxe Edition (2013)
- Love & Work: The Lioness Sessions (2018)
