= Amalgamated Sons of Rest =

EP by Amalgamated Sons of Rest
- Released: September 1, 2002
- Genre: Folk
- Label: Galaxia

Professional ratings
Review scores
Source	Rating
AllMusic	2.5/5 stars
Pitchfork Media	(5.9/10)

Amalgamated Sons of Rest is the name of a one-off project by American songwriters Will Oldham and Jason Molina, along with Scottish colleague Alasdair Roberts. The collaboration yielded an eponymous EP, released in 2002 on Galaxia Records, and two singles, "Translation", released by Jade Tree Records, and "September 11, 2001", later released in 2015. "Translation" was not released under the Amalgamated Sons of Rest moniker, but under Molina's then-usual band name, Songs: Ohia, on a split EP with My Morning Jacket, though the songwriter credit is to "A.S. of R."

== Track listing ==
1. "Maa Bonny Lad"
2. "My Donal"
3. "The Gypsy He-Witch"
4. "The Last House"
5. "Major March"
6. "Jennie Blackbird’s Blues"
7. "I Will Be Good"

The last track, "I Will Be Good", is unlisted.
