= The Lioness (album) =

Studio album by Songs: Ohia
- Released: January 17, 2000
- Recorded: 1999
- Genres: Indie rock, alt-country
- Length: 39:36
- Label: Secretly Canadian
- Producer: Andrew Miller

Songs: Ohia chronology
Protection Spells (2000)	The Lioness (2000)	Ghost Tropic (2000)

Professional ratings
Aggregate scores
Source	Rating
Metacritic	74/100
Review scores
Source	Rating
AllMusic	3/5 stars
The Encyclopedia of Popular Music	3/5 stars
NME	2.5/5 stars
Pitchfork	7.6/10 (2000); 8.7/10 (2018)
Reno Gazette-Journal	4/4 stars

The Lioness is the fourth studio album by Songs: Ohia. It was released by Secretly Canadian on January 17, 2000. A reissue of the album, Love & Work: The Lioness Sessions, was released on November 23, 2018.

== Production ==
The album was recorded by Andy Miller at Chem 19 Studios in Hamilton, near Glasgow, Scotland, with Alasdair Roberts, Geof Comings, Jonathan Cargill, and members of Arab Strap.

== Critical reception ==
The Lioness was met with "generally favorable" reviews from critics. At Metacritic, which assigns a weighted average rating out of 100 to reviews from mainstream publications, this release received an average score of 74, based on 4 reviews.

Exclaim! thought that "the transatlantic recording session inspired Molina to produce what is both his darkest and cheerful record to date." The Austin Chronicle called the album "quiet and reflective, numbing and resolute, with writing as simple and straightforward as an ice pick under the ribs." The Sunday Times wrote that "Songs: Ohia's slug- paced folk-blues owe an obvious debt to the spectral yowling of Will Oldham's Palace Brothers, but The Lioness still has the power to turn the most brightly lit room a delicate shade of blue."

== Track listing ==
All songs written by Jason Molina.

=== Original release ===
1. "The Black Crow" – 7:16
2. "Tigress" – 3:20
3. "Nervous Bride" – 2:43
4. "Being in Love" – 5:41
5. "Lioness" – 6:37
6. "Coxcomb Red" – 4:05
7. "Back on Top" – 4:22
8. "Baby Take a Look" – 3:06
9. "Just a Spark" – 2:19

=== Love & Work: The Lioness Sessions ===
1. "The Black Crow" – 7:16
2. "Tigress" – 3:20
3. "Nervous Bride" – 2:43
4. "Being in Love" – 5:41
5. "Lioness" – 6:37
6. "Coxcomb Red" – 4:05
7. "Back on Top" – 4:22
8. "Baby Take a Look" – 3:06
9. "Just a Spark" – 2:19
10. "On My Way Home" (Lioness sessions outtake) – 3:01
11. "Never Fake It" (Lioness sessions outtake) – 3:10
12. "From the Heart" (Lioness sessions outtake) – 4:28
13. "It Gets Harder Over Time" (Lioness sessions outtake) – 2:12
14. "I Promise Not to Quit" (Lioness sessions outtake) – 5:44
15. "Neighbors of Our Age" (Lioness sessions outtake) – 2:43
16. "Pyrate II (Even Now)" (Lioness sessions outtake) – 4:08
17. "Velvet Marching Band" (Lissy's sessions) – 3:00
18. "Raw" (Lissy's sessions) – 3:46
19. "Already Through" (Lissy's sessions) – 4:00
20. "Wonderous Love" (Lissy's sessions) – 2:20

== Personnel ==
- Jason Molina
- Jonathan Cargill
- Geof Comings
- David Gow
- Aidan Moffat
- Alasdair Roberts
- Engineered by Andy Miller
