= Ghost Tropic =

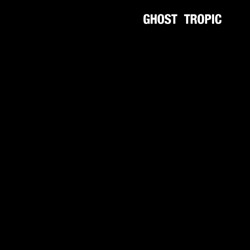

Studio album by Songs: Ohia
- Released: November 13, 2000
- Genre: Indie folk; post-rock; experimental
- Label: Secretly Canadian
- Producer: Mike Mogis

Songs: Ohia chronology
The Lioness (2000)	Ghost Tropic (2000)	Mi Sei Apparso Come Un Fantasma (2001)

Professional ratings
Review scores
Source	Rating
AllMusic	2.5/5 stars
Pitchfork	7.5/10

Ghost Tropic is the fifth regular studio album by Songs: Ohia. It was recorded by Mike Mogis at Dead Space Recording Studio in Lincoln, Nebraska.

The album features two short instrumental title tracks that are surrounded by six vocal tracks of at least five and up to twelve minutes length. In its critical evaluation upon release, reviewers noted the somber and dark mood permeating the album.

== Critical reception ==
According to Pitchfork, "Ghost Tropic (...) sounds as though it were recorded live in a haunted hut somewhere in an Ecuadorian rainforest. At night." AllMusic was less sanguine: "Everything moves as slowly as a three-legged dog, and anyone neither patient enough nor attuned to Molina's style of songcraft (imagine Neil Young doing very mellow gypsy folk music) might very well be put to sleep."

== Track listing ==
1. "Lightning Risked It All" – 5:39
2. "The Body Burned Away" – 5:35
3. "No Limits on the Words" – 5:21
4. "Ghost Tropic" – 2:36
5. "Ocean's Nerves" – 5:03
6. "Not Just a Ghost's Heart" – 12:02
7. "Ghost Tropic" – 3:09
8. "Incantation" – 11:53

== Recording information ==
- Jason Molina
- Shane Aspegren
- Mike Mogis
- Alasdair Roberts
- Songs by Jason Molina
- Recorded by Mike Mogis
