= Trials & Errors =

Live album by Magnolia Electric Co.
- Released: January 18, 2005
- Recorded: April 16, 2003
- Genre: Indie rock
- Length: 72:22
- Label: Secretly Canadian

Magnolia Electric Co. chronology
The Magnolia Electric Co. (2003)	Trials & Errors (2005)	What Comes After the Blues (2005)

Professional ratings
Aggregate scores
Source	Rating
Metacritic	79/100
Review scores
Source	Rating
AllMusic	3.5/5 stars
Pitchfork Media	5.7/10
Tiny Mix Tapes	3.5/5 stars

Trials & Errors is a live album by Magnolia Electric Co., released on Secretly Canadian in 2005. It was recorded on April 16, 2003, at Club Ancienne Belgique in Brussels.

It was the first Magnolia Electric Co. album released under that name, even though at the time of recording the band still toured under the Songs: Ohia moniker. The album received generally favorable reviews according to Metacritic, with multiple reviewers noticing the homage to Neil Young and Crazy Horse, but offering mixed opinions on its success: "[It is] hard to avoid thinking of Neil Young and Crazy Horse at the peak of their '70s powers" (Mojo, Feb 2005). "Magnolia Electric Co. is no Crazy Horse, and Molina's vocabulary on the guitar doesn't yet have the presence to carry such extended interpretations of his material." (Pitchfork Media, February 1, 2005). The album itself is made up of ten original songs, all but three of which were at the time unreleased, but contains three fragments of Neil Young songs, including the show-closing chorus of "Tonight's the Night" at the end of the song "The Big Beast", as well as the Young tunes "Out on the Weekend" and "Walk On". The fragments are technically uncredited, but the liner notes contain the information "Songs written by J.M. (Jason Molina) and there are ones that clearly have not[,] they're included here respectfully. Thank you."

== Track listing ==
1. "The Dark Don't Hide It" – 5:51
2. "Don't This Look Like the Dark" – 5:50
3. "Such Pretty Eyes for a Snake" – 8:49
4. "Almost Was Good Enough" – 9:13
5. "North Star" – 8:26
6. "Ring the Bell" – 6:01
7. "Cross the Road" – 6:38
8. "Leave the City" – 6:21
9. "The Last 3 Human Words" – 7:11
10. "The Big Beast" – 7:58

== Recording information ==
- Jason Groth – guitar
- Pete Schreiner – drums
- Mike Kapinus – bass, trumpet
- Jason Molina – guitar, singing
- Jochem Schouten – sound, driving
- Recorded by Stef van Alsenoy

Physical copies were limited to 10,000 per version (vinyl and CD), and the album is now available digitally via iTunes and Spotify.
