= Emily Portman =

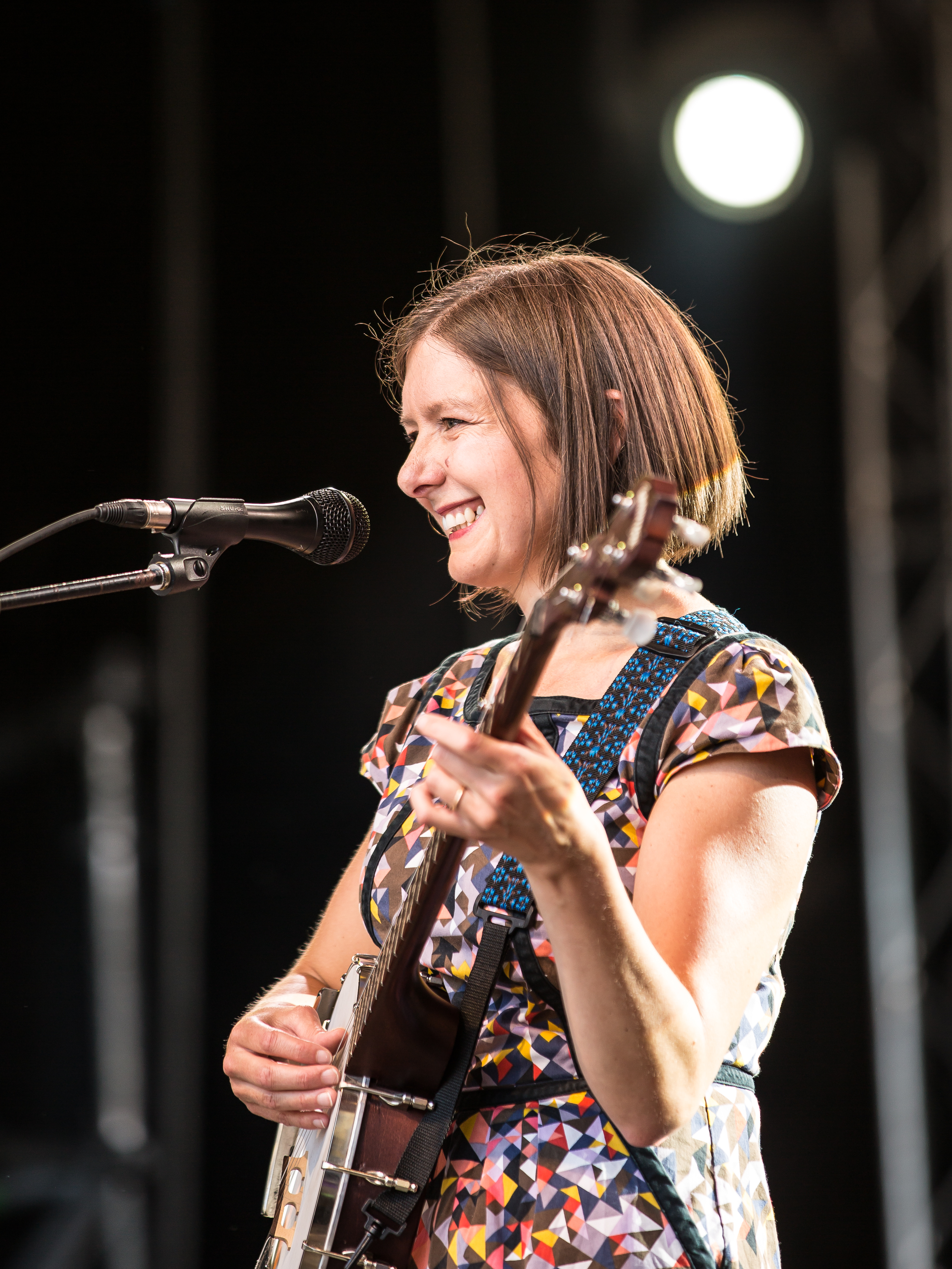
- Portman in 2016

Background information
- Origin: Glastonbury
- Genre: folk music
- Years active: 2010-present
- Website: www.emilyportman.co.uk

Emily Portman is an English folk singer, songwriter and musician. She is also a banjo and concertina player, an educator and a workshop leader.

== Early life and education ==
Emily Portman was born in Glastonbury, England. Her interest in folk music was prompted by her college tutor, Howard Harrison, while she was studying in Taunton. She subsequently studied folk music at Newcastle University. She has also since written about folk music for fRoots magazine.

== Career ==
Emily Portman began her music career in the early 2000s as a member of various bands and ensembles, including the acoustic trio Devil's Interval. In 2010, she released her debut solo album, The Glamoury, which was inspired by fairy tales and received critical acclaim.

In 2012, Portman released her second album, Hatchling. The album was praised for its ethereal and dreamlike quality, and earned Portman a nomination for the BBC Radio 2 Folk Award for Best Original Song ('Hatchlings').

Portman's third album, Coracle, was released in 2015 and featured new compositions drawing on British ballads and folktales. The album explored themes of motherhood, death, and other worlds, and received widespread critical acclaim.

The duo album with Rob Harbron, Time Was Away, was released in 2022. It comprised eight English folk songs and two 20th Century poems set to music.

In May 2026, Portman released a new album of original songs Dominion of Spells, her first solo album in over a decade.

In addition to her solo work, Portman is also a member of the traditional song band the Furrow Collective, which won the BBC Folk Award for Best Band in 2017. She has collaborated with a number of other musicians, including Martin Simpson and the Waterson family.

== Artificial intelligence impersonation ==
In July 2025 Portman received press interest after becoming aware that music distribution platforms including Spotify and iTunes were distributing music developed by artificial intelligence under her name that appeared to impersonate her. The impersonation included an AI-generated album with songs that convinced some of her fans of its authenticity with how realistic and similar the vocals, instrumentation, song titles, and overall presentation of the music was. She was unable to ascertain who put the album up or why, but noted that as none of the songs had more than 2,000 plays whoever uploaded them did not receive much money for the hoax. In investigating the matter, she discovered the impersonation is part of a contemporary trend where AI impersonates musicians on a platform.
