= Dan Sullivan (musician) =

American musician

Dan Sullivan is an American indie rock musician based in Chicago, Illinois. He started his musical career with self-titled (albeit mirrored) folk rock band Nad Navillus, (also styled NadNavillus), releasing three albums from March 1999 to November 2002, then reviving the project again in 2021. He was also a member of the short-lived post-rock project A-Z Consolidated, releasing one EP.

Sullivan was also known as a guitarist in Jason Molina's band Songs: Ohia from 2000 to 2003 and plays on the seminal "Magnolia Electric Company" LP. He founded metal band Arriver in 2005 but left the group in 2025.

He is a designer and woodworker and his company Navillus Woodworks was selected to provide chairs, stools and tables for the restaurant at the center of The Bear.

== Personal life ==
He is married to Puerto Rican artist Edra Soto, and the two are frequent creative collaborators.

== Discography ==
- NadNavillus, "Here All Long/First Light" (released February 2026)
- NadNavillus, "Upper Constant" (released April 2025)
- NadNavillus, "Forgotten Portraits" (released June 2023)
- Arriver, "Azimuth" (released May 2023)
- Arriver, "Emeritus" (released May 2016)
- Arriver, "TSUSHIMA" Bloodlust 170 (released February 2012)
- Rabid Rabbit "Czarny Sen" Bloodlust 169 (released January 2012)
- Arriver, "Center Down" Nodak 006 split 7-inch (released June 2011)
- Arriver, "Simon Mann EP" BecRec (released February 2010)
- Arriver, "Vanlandingham and Zone" Proshop (released 2006)
- The American Pringles "1968-1970" Proshop (released June 2006)
- The American Pringles "The Pringles Are Coming!" ProShop 015 (released June 2005)
- The Butchershop Quartet "The Rite of Spring" G4CD7701 (released April 2004)
- Nad Navillus "Iron Night" Jag51 (released November 2002)
- Nad Navillus "Show Your Face" Jagjaguwar (released November 2001)
- A-Z Consolidated s/t ProShop 008 (released October 1999)
- Nad Navillus s/t ProShop 005 (released March 1999)
- Cockpokalypse "C'est Cockpokalypse" (cassette release 1996)
- Cockpokalypse "Big Gun Party Fun" (cassette release 1995)
- Yakamashi "Shot Out Your Asshole" (cassette release 1995)
- Cockpokalypse "Answer Lies" (cassette release 1993)
- Wrektomb s/t (cassette release 1993)
- Nad Navillus "On the Ground" (cassette release 1993)

=== On other releases ===
- Songs: Ohia "Live: Vanquishers" SC454 (released October 2024)
- Dylan Posa and Three Cheers For One Dead Man "Executive Shirts '79/The Nairu Report" 7-inch Northern Varieties NV03 (2006)
- Dave LaCrone and the Mistletones "The New Old-Fashioned Way" (December 2003)
- Songs: Ohia "The Magnolia Electric Company" SC76 (released February 2003)
- Parker Paul "Wingfoot" Jag28 (released October 2001)
- Songs: Ohia “Mi Sei Apparso Come Un Fantasma” Paper Cup/White and Black (released September 2001)
- Joan of Arse "Distant Hearts A Little Closer" slab4 (released September 2001)
- Steve Fanagan "There is Hope" mango010 (released July 2001)
- Songs: Ohia/Glen Hansard split 7-inch RR7-006 (released December 2000)
- Skeeter Pete & the Sullivan Mountain Boys s/t Bert 012 (released April 2000)

=== Compilations ===
- An International Compilation "Performance #1" ITC 8 (released July 2002)
- Tract Records "Eye of the Beholder II" TR002 (released October 2002)
