= Impala (album) =

Studio album by Songs: Ohia
- Released: April 1, 1998
- Genre: Indie rock, alt-country
- Label: Happy-Go-Lucky (CD); Secretly Canadian (LP)

Songs: Ohia chronology
Songs: Ohia (1997)	Impala (1998)	The Ghost (1999)

Professional ratings
Review scores
Source	Rating
AllMusic	4/5 stars

Impala is the second album by Songs: Ohia. It was released in 1998 via Happy-Go-Lucky and Secretly Canadian.

== Critical reception ==
AllMusic called Impala "a lovely, peeling, chipped record of emotional decay." Tucson Weekly deemed it "spare, organ-based melancholy pop."

== Track listing ==
All songs written by Jason Molina.

1. "An Ace Unable to Change" (Gambling Song) – 7:45
2. "Easts Heart Divided" (45 Degrees) – 2:13
3. "This Time Anything Finite at All" (Trans Am) – 3:58
4. "Hearts Newly Arrived" (Revellie) – 3:32
5. "Till Morning Reputations" (Travel) – 2:52
6. "One of Those Uncertain Hands" (Anchors) – 1:17
7. "A Humble Cause Again" (Bath) – 2:08
8. "The Rules of Absence" (Spaniel) – 2:24
9. "Just What Can Last" (All Friends Leave You) – 4:34
10. "Program: The Mask" (Angel Anthem) – 2:15
11. "Structuring: Necessity" (The Eagle) – 2:44
12. "Separations: Reminder" (Sept. 17) – 2:46
13. "Program and Disjunction" (Ours the Armada) – 3:10

== Recording information ==
- Jason Molina
- Geof Comings (Party Girls)
