= Alasdair Roberts (musician) =

Scottish folk musician (born 1977)

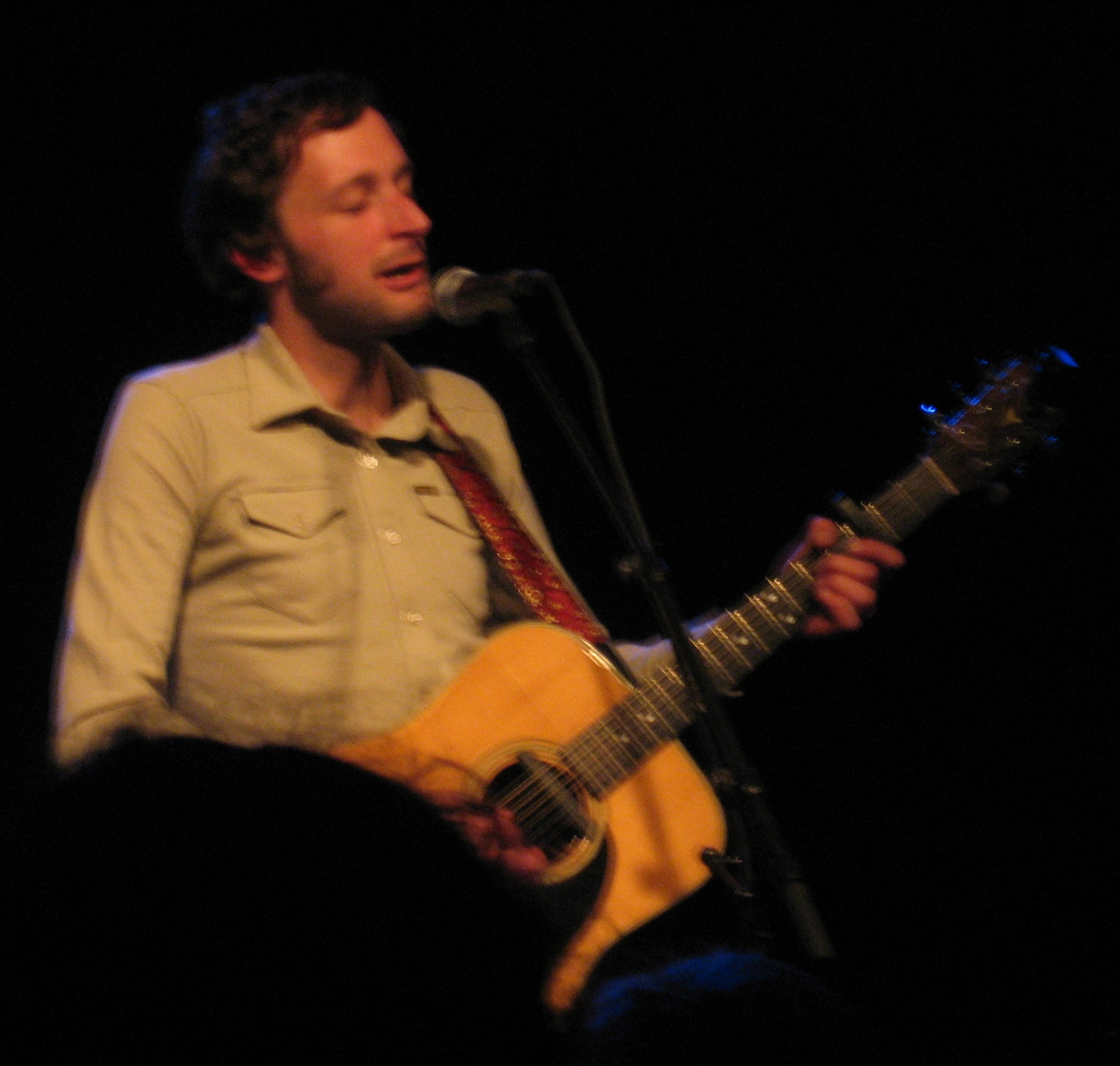
- Alasdair Roberts at a concert in Berlin, May 2008

Background information
- Also known as: Appendix Out
- Born: 8 August 1977 (age 49); Geislingen an der Steige, West Germany
- Origin: Kilmahog, Stirling, Scotland
- Genres: Folk, indie folk, indie rock
- Years active: 1994–present
- Labels: Drag City; Secretly Canadian; Rough Trade; Room40; Rif Mountain
- Website: alasdairroberts.com

Alasdair Roberts (born 8 August 1977) is a Scottish folk musician. He released a number of albums under the name Appendix Out and, following the 2001 album The Night Is Advancing, under his own name. Roberts is also known for his frequent collaborations with other musicians and writers, as well as for being a member of the folk supergroup The Furrow Collective.

== Early life ==
Roberts was born in Geislingen an der Steige, Germany, the son of former folk guitarist (and partner of Dougie MacLean) Alan Roberts (1946–2001) and his German wife Annegret. He has two sisters. He was raised in Kilmahog, a hamlet close to the small town of Callander, near Stirling in central Scotland, where he started playing the guitar and writing music. He has long been based in Glasgow.

== Appendix Out ==
In 1994 Alasdair Roberts formed Appendix Out with school friends Dave Elcock and Kenny McBride and started playing small venues. Roberts was also a classmate of Ladytron's Helen Marnie. While attending a Will Oldham concert in 1995, he offered a demo tape to the American singer, and a contract with US label Drag City soon followed. The band's first release was a double A-side single, "Pissed With You/Ice Age", and the band released its first album around a year later.

Between 1997 and 2001, Appendix Out released three albums, two EPs and some limited-edition recordings that were never widely distributed. They recorded a session for John Peel's BBC radio show in 2001. The line up of the band changed frequently, with Roberts the only constant member.

== Solo career ==
After three full-length albums with Appendix Out, Roberts recorded his first solo album, The Crook of My Arm. This album consisted almost entirely of solo vocals and guitar in marked contrast to the occasionally experimental sound of the Appendix Out records. All the songs are traditional, and Roberts credited the singers from whose performances he'd learnt the songs (these included his father, Alan Roberts, and Alan's sometime musical partner, Dougie MacLean).

Since then, Roberts has released two further albums of traditional folk songs – No Earthly Man and Too Long in This Condition – plus three albums of original songs: Farewell Sorrow, The Amber Gatherers and Spoils. A fourth, A Wonder Working Stone, was released in January 2013, credited to Alasdair Roberts and Friends, a group of musicians which includes among others Stevie Jones, Rafe Fitzpatrick, Olivia Chaney and Alex Neilson. In 2015 Roberts released a self-titled album, a return to relative sparseness of earlier albums, and in 2017 Pangs, which was again a more collaborative album, featuring musicians with whom Roberts has previously worked – Stevie Jones, Tom Crossley and Alex Neilson – and backing vocals from Debbie Armour.

Each album has a distinct character, and Roberts songwriting has shifted in recent years from the relative economy of Farewell Sorrow and The Amber Gatherers to a much denser wordplay, filled with allusions to mythology, esoteric spirituality and gnosticism, on Spoils and other recent releases.

In 2012, musician Steve Adey covered "Farewell Sorrow" on his The Tower of Silence album.

== Collaborations ==
Roberts is quoted as saying "Collaboration is extremely important to me. I reiterate – extremely". His collaborations have taken many forms.

=== Accompanying musicians ===
A large number of musicians have played with Alasdair Roberts when recording or performing under his own name. These include:

- Electric bass: Gerard Love, Gareth Eggie, Bill Lowman, Will Oldham, Paul Oldham
- Stand-up bass: Stevie Jones
- Fiddle: Rafe Fitzpatrick, Alastair Caplin, Elle Osborne, John McCusker
- Drums: Alex Neilson, Shane Connolly, Rian Murphy, Tom Crossley
- Guitar: Gordon Ferries, Gareth Eggie, RM Hubbert
- Cello: Isobel Campbell, Christine Hanson
- Piano: Tom Crossley, Isobel Campbell, Emily MacLaren
- Vocals: Emily Portman, Will Oldham, Tom Crossley, Niko-Matti Ahti, Debbie Armour
- Jouhikko: Pekko Käppi
- Viol: Alison McGillivray
- Harpsichord, harmonium: David McGuiness
- Harp: Kirsten Koppel, Bill Lowman
- Pipes: Donald Lindsay

=== Group, ensemble and duo work ===
- In 2001, Roberts collaborated with friends and label-mates Will Oldham and Jason Molina, both playing on their albums and on the one-off album, Amalgamated Sons of Rest.
- With members of the Second Hand Marching Band, Roberts is part of The Robert Tannahill Project, dedicated to performing the songs of Scots poet Robert Tannahill.
- Roberts took part in a week-long residency in Aldeburgh, titled "Revenge of the Folksingers" and led by Concerto Caledonia's David McGuinness, in December 2010. Other participants included the members of Concerto Caledonia, Jim Moray and Olivia Chaney. Roberts contributed an original song, as well as singing songs by Ivor Cutler, Benjamin Britten, Hamish Henderson and from the traditional repertoire. An album with the same title and selection of songs was released in 2011.
- In 2010, Roberts performed a suite of songs written by the Icelandic artist Benni Hemm Hemm as part of the Reykjavik Arts Festival
- Roberts collaborated with Karine Polwart on a series of performances in Stirling, London and Sidmouth Folk Week in 2010 and 2011 (also joined by Corrina Hewat in Stirling and London). The pair released a recording of the traditional song, Captain Wedderburn's Courtship, as a 7" single in 2011.
- Roberts collaborated with Mairi Morrison, a Glasgow-based Gaelic singer from the Isle of Lewis, on an album of traditional songs, Urstan, released in March 2012.
- The Fruit Tree Foundation is a mental health initiative featuring nine Scottish songwriters, writing mainly in pairs. Roberts contributed songs with James Yorkston and Rod Jones to the resulting album, First Edition.
- Roberts contributed to Pumajaw's Curiosity Box album (2008), and, as writer and performer, to Jackie Oates' Hyperboreans album.
- With Alex Neilson, Lavinia Blackwall and Michael Flower – under the group name Black Flowers – Roberts played on the album I Grew From a Stone to a Statue.
- Roberts sang the lead vocals on Draughty Old Fortress on David Rotheray's album The Life of Birds.
- Roberts collaborated with RM Hubbert on a version of The False Bride for Hubbert's 2012 album, Thirteen Lost & Found (Chemikal Underground, CHEM166).
- Roberts appeared on tracks of the 2013 album by Lisa Knapp, Hidden Seam.
- Along with Emily Portman, Lucy Farrell and Rachel Newton, Roberts is part of The Furrow Collective. They have released three albums: At Our Next Meeting (2014), Wild Hog (2016) and Fathoms (2018).

=== Theatre, film and literary work ===
- Roberts played hurdy-gurdy on the soundtrack of the 2003 film Young Adam. This was later released under the title Lead Us Not into Temptation by David Byrne.
- Roberts contributed a newly written song, Dighty Burn, as soundtrack to Edward Summerton and Michael Windle's 2011 short film Dighty.
- In early 2011, Roberts took part in a three-month residency at the School of Scottish Studies, under the title "Archive Trails". He collaborated with puppet maker and puppeteer Shane Connolly on two short pieces of musical theatre: The Secret Society of Horsemen and a reworking of the Scots mummers play Galoshins for puppets.
- Roberts has collaborated with the artist and filmmaker Luke Fowler on a video for his song "Under No Enchantment (But My Own)" and by contributing music to the soundtrack of Fowler's 2011 film about R.D. Laing, All Divided Selves.
- Roberts first worked with the Scots poet Robin Robertson on a song for the 2007 album of musician-poet collaborations Ballads of the Book. The two went on to collaborate on a song cycle based upon the archipelago of St Kilda.

=== Testimonials and additional contributions ===
Roberts has contributed to the following:

- Lal Waterson – performance at Cecil Sharp House, London, in October 2007, as part of BBC Electric Proms, plus a recording of Waterson's The Bird for the tribute album Migrating Bird, curated by Charlotte Greig
- The Incredible String Band – performance at the Barbican Centre, London, in July 2009, curated by Joe Boyd and also featuring Robyn Hitchcock, Trembling Bells, Dr Strangely Strange and others.
- Neil Young – performance at the Queen Elizabeth Theatre, Vancouver, in February 2010, curated by Hal Wilner as part of the Cultural Olympiad.
- Alistair Hulett – Roberts recorded a version of Hulett's The Dark Loch for the tribute album Love, Loss and Liberty: The Songs of Alistair Hulett, released in 2011 after the latter's death.
- Jason Molina – Roberts recorded a version of Molina's Being in Love for the benefit album Do I Have to be Alright, All of the Time?, released for download in 2012 and performed at a benefit concert in London in September 2012.
- Alan Lomax – Roberts was asked by Nathan Salsburg of the Alan Lomax Archive to curate an album of the recordings of traditional Scottish songs that Alan Lomax collected, resulting in the compilation album Whaur The Pig Gaed on the Spree (2011).

== Discography ==
=== Appendix Out ===
- The Rye Bears a Poison – Drag City, 1997

Lineup: Alasdair Roberts, Eva Peck, Dave Elcock, Louise D

- Well Lit Tonight – Creeping Bent, 1997 (Split single with The Leopards – Cutting a Short Dog)
- Daylight Saving – Drag City, 1999

Lineup: Alasdair Roberts, Gareth Eggie, Dave Elcock, Tom Crossley, Kate Wright

- The Night Is Advancing – Drag City, 2001

Lineup: Alasdair Roberts, Gareth Eggie, Tom Crossley. Also featuring Dave Elcock, Annabel Wright, Mark Harvey, Donald Lindsay, Rian Murphy, Sheryl Norquay, Sean O'Hagan

- A Warm and Yeasty Corner (EP) – Shingle Street, 2001

Lineup: Alasdair Roberts, Brad Gallagher, Lindsay Anderson, Bill Lowman

(The group also recorded a Christmas album in 2000, consisting of home recordings of traditional Christmas carols. This album was only available as a gift from band members and on sale at a handful of gigs around that time.)

=== As Alasdair Roberts ===
- Crook of My Arm – Secretly Canadian, 2001
- Farewell Sorrow – Drag City and Rough Trade, 2003
- No Earthly Man – Drag City, 2005
- You Need Not Braid Your Hair for Me: I Have Not Come A-Wooing (EP) – originally given away at a concert at Cecil Sharp House, 2005
- The Amber Gatherers – Drag City, 2007
- Spoils – Drag City, 2009
- The Wyrd Meme (EP) – Drag City, 2009
- The Ayrtime EP (EP) – Ayrtime, Alloway (produced by Chris Dooks), 2009
- Too Long in This Condition – Drag City, 2010 (as Alasdair Roberts & Friends)
- A Wonder Working Stone – Drag City, 2013 (as Alasdair Roberts & Friends)
- Alasdair Roberts – Drag City, 2015
- Pangs – Drag City, 2017
- What News – Drag City, 2018 (as Alasdair Roberts, Amble Skuse & David McGuinness)
- The Fiery Margin – Drag City, 2019
- The Songs of My Boyhood (digital only) – fresh reworkings of Appendix Out tracks – Drag City, 2020
- Fretted and Indebted (EP) – Infinite Greyscale, 2020
- The Old Fabled River - Drag City, 2021 (as Alasdair Roberts og Völvur)
- Grief in the Kitchen and Mirth in the Hall - - Drag City, 2023

=== Further contributions to compilations and collaborative releases ===
Roberts has contributed performances and recordings exclusive to the following releases:

- Amalgamated Sons of Rest – Galaxia, 2002, with Will Oldham and Jason Molina
- I Grew From a Stone to a Statue – Bo Weavil, 2009, as a member of the Black Flowers group with Alex Neilson, Lavinia Blackwall and Michael Flower
- A Selection of Marches, Quicksteps, Laments, Strathspeys Reels and Country Dances – Room40, 2010, with Jackie Oates
- Horses and Hangings, Homicide and Hellfire – Leigh Folk Festival compilation, 2010, on which Roberts performs the traditional song The Bonnie Banks o' the Airdrie
- Revenge of the Folksingers – Delphian Records, 2011, Concerto Caledonia album, for which Roberts wrote and performed the original song The Sacred Nine and the Primal Horde and performed the traditional songs False Lover John, The Freedom Come All Ye and Bonnie Susie Cleland
- First Edition – Chemikal Underground, 2011, Fruit Tree Foundation mental health project, for which contributed to the original songs Beware Beware and The Untrue Womb
- Captain Wedderburn's Courtship – Drag City, 2011, with Karine Polwart (and b/w Dowie Dens O' Yarrow by Drew Wright)
- Urstan – Drag City, 2012, album of traditional and original songs with Mairi Morrison
- Wrecks, Rucks, Riots and Resurrection – Leigh Folk Festival compilation, 2012, on which Roberts performs the traditional jig Smash the Windows
- Weirdlore – Folk Police, 2012, compilation for which Roberts wrote and performed the original song Haruspex of Paradox
- Folk Songs II – Static Caravan, 2012, Big Eyes Family Players album on which Roberts performed the traditional songs The Coast o' Spain and Maureen from Gippursland
- Harbour of Songs – Stables Trading, 2012, songs Inspired by The Lone Twin Boat Project for which Roberts wrote and performed the original song My Rola-Bola Board
- Weary Engine Blues: Crossroads – Graveface Records, 2013, benefit compilation in remembrance of Jason Molina for which Roberts covered Songs: Ohia's Erie Canal.
- Hirta Songs – Stone Tape Recordings, 2013, with Robin Robertson
- Solo Man – Jinnwoo featuring Alasdair Roberts, 2014
- Green Ribbons – an unaccompanied voice project with Frankie Armstrong, Jinnwoo and Burd Ellen – since 2018
