= Jim & Jennie and the Pinetops =

American bluegrass group

- Origin: Philadelphia, Pennsylvania, United States
- Genres: Bluegrass
- Years active: 1998–present
- Labels: Overcoat Recordings; Bloodshot Records

Jim & Jennie and the Pinetops is an American bluegrass group from Philadelphia, Pennsylvania, United States.

== History ==
Jim Krewson first played bluegrass in a group called the Slobber Mountain Boys; Jennie Benford learned bluegrass from her father, a banjo player. The two first met in New York City in 1998 and began playing together with banjo player Brad Hutchison and bassist Brendan Skwire. They recorded their first album under the name Jim & Jennie and the Pine Barons, released in 1999; two further albums would follow on Overcoat Recordings before landing an album on Bloodshot Records in 2005, touring the US all the while (including dates with Neko Case) and encountering significant media exposure.

== Members ==
- Jim Krewson - vocals, guitar
- Jennie Benford - vocals, mandolin
- Brendan Skwire - bass
- Brad Hutchison - banjo
- Matt Downing - bass

== Discography ==
- Jim & Jennie and the Pine Barons (Phovsho Records, 1999)
- Little Birdie (Overcoat Recordings, 2000)
- One More in the Cabin (Overcoat, 2002)
- Rivers Roll On By (Bloodshot Records, 2005)
