= List of 2025 albums =

The following is a list of albums, EPs, and mixtapes released in 2025. These albums are (1) original, i.e. excluding reissues, remasters, and compilations of previously released recordings, and (2) notable, defined as having received significant coverage from reliable sources independent of the subject.

For additional information about bands formed, reformed, disbanded, or on hiatus, for deaths of musicians, and for links to musical awards, see 2025 in music.

== First quarter ==
=== January ===
List of albums released in January 2025
Go to: January | February | March | April | May | June | July | August | September | October | November | December | Back to top
| Release date | Artist | Album | Genre | Label | Ref. |
| January 1 | Edward Skeletrix | Museum Music | Hip-hop, rage | Edward Skeletrix | |
| January 3 | Boldy James and RichGains | Murder During Drug Traffic | | Boldy James & RichGains | |
| January 3 | Lil Baby | WHAM | Hip-hop | Glass Window Entertainment, Quality Control, Motown | |
| January 3 | Paleface Swiss | Cursed | Deathcore, nu metalcore | Blood Blast | |
| January 5 | Bad Bunny | Debí Tirar Más Fotos | Reggaeton, plena, jíbaro | Rimas | |
| January 8 | Ethel Cain | Perverts | Dark ambient, slowcore, drone | Daughters of Cain | |
| January 10 | Franz Ferdinand | The Human Fear | | Domino | |
| January 10 | Lambrini Girls | Who Let the Dogs Out | Punk rock | City Slang | |
| January 10 | Moonchild Sanelly | Full Moon | | Transgressive | |
| January 10 | Ringo Starr | Look Up | Country | UMe | |
| January 10 | Rio da Yung OG | Rio Free | | #Boyz Entertainment, Empire | |
| January 10 | Tremonti | The End Will Show Us How | Alternative metal, hard rock | Napalm | |
| January 10 | Xhosa Cole | On a Modern Genius Vol 1 | | Stoney Lane Records | |
| January 15 | Silent Siren | More Than Pink | | Youthful Tune | |
| January 15 | SixTones | Gold | | SME Japan | |
| January 17 | Alessi Rose | For Your Validation | | AWAL | |
| January 17 | Børns | Honeybee | | | |
| January 17 | David Gray | Dear Life | | Laugh a Minute Records | |
| January 17 | Dear Seattle | Toy | | Domestic La La | |
| January 17 | Delivery | Force Majeure | Garage rock, punk | Heavenly | |
| January 17 | Eidola | Mend | | Rise, Blue Swan | |
| January 17 | Ela Minus | Dia | | Domino | |
| January 17 | Ex-Void | In Love Again | Indie rock | Tapete | |
| January 17 | Knock2 | Nolimit | | 88rising | |
| January 17 | Mac Miller | Balloonerism | Neo soul, jazz, experimental | Warner | |
| January 17 | Parchman Prison Prayer | Another Mississippi Sunday Morning | Gospel, blues | Glitterbeat Records | |
| January 17 | Rose Gray | Louder, Please | Dance-pop | PIAS | |
| January 17 | Songhoy Blues | Héritage | | Transgressive | |
| January 17 | Tokyo Blade | Time Is the Fire | | | |
| January 17 | Victoria Canal | Slowly, It Dawns | | Parlophone | |
| January 17 | The Weather Station | Humanhood | | Fat Possum | |
| January 20 | Got7 | Winter Heptagon | | Kakao | |
| January 22 | Nemophila | Apple of My Eye | | Master Works | |
| January 24 | Anna B Savage | You & I Are Earth | | City Slang | |
| January 24 | Avatarium | Between You, God, the Devil and the Dead | | AFM | |
| January 24 | Benjamin Booker | Lower | | Fire Next Time Records, Thirty Tigers | |
| January 24 | Björk | Apple Music Live: Björk (Cornucopia) | | One Little Independent | |
| January 24 | Boldy James | Permanent Ink | | Royal House Recordings | |
| January 24 | Bumblefoot | Bumblefoot ...Returns! | | | |
| January 24 | C Duncan | It's Only a Love Song | | Bella Union | |
| January 24 | Central Cee | Can't Rush Greatness | UK drill | CC4L, Columbia | |
| January 24 | Dax Riggs | 7 Songs for Spiders | | | |
| January 24 | Ditz | Never Exhale | | Alcopop! | |
| January 24 | Ellie Holcomb and Drew Holcomb | Memory Bank | | | |
| January 24 | FKA Twigs | Eusexua | Avant-pop, techno | Young, Atlantic | |
| January 24 | Ghais Guevara | Goyard Ibn Said | Hardcore hip-hop, alternative hip-hop | Fat Possum | |
| January 24 | Harakiri for the Sky | Scorched Earth | | AOP Records | |
| January 24 | Hunxho | For Us | | 300 | |
| January 24 | Iggy Pop | Live at Montreux Jazz Festival 2023 | | earMUSIC | |
| January 24 | JoJo | NGL | | Clover Music | |
| January 24 | Jordan Adetunji | A Jaguar's Dream | | 300, Warner UK | |
| January 24 | Kane Brown | The High Road | Country | RCA Nashville | |
| January 24 | Kathryn Mohr | Waiting Room | Ambient pop | The Flenser | |
| January 24 | Labyrinth | In the Vanishing Echoes of Goodbye | Power metal, progressive metal | Frontiers | |
| January 24 | Larkin Poe | Bloom | | Tricki-Woo Records | |
| January 24 | Mary Chapin Carpenter, Julie Fowlis and Karine Polwart | Looking for the Thread | | Thirty Tigers | |
| January 24 | Matt Berry | Heard Noises | Psychedelic rock, psychedelic pop | Acid Jazz | |
| January 24 | Mogwai | The Bad Fire | Post-rock | Rock Action, TRL | |
| January 24 | Novulent | Before Evolution | | Capitol | |
| January 24 | OsamaSon | Jump Out | Rage | Atlantic | |
| January 24 | Rose City Band | Sol y Sombra | | Thrill Jockey | |
| January 24 | Sam Amidon | Salt River | Folk, country | River Lea Records | |
| January 24 | Teddy Swims | I've Tried Everything but Therapy (Part 2) | | Warner | |
| January 24 | Tunng | Love You All Over Again | | Full Time Hobby | |
| January 24 | Vukovi | My God Has Got a Gun | | SharpTone | |
| January 24 | Young Knives | Landfill | | Gadzook Records | |
| January 27 | Pink Siifu | Black'!Antique | Experimental hip-hop | Dynamite Hill | |
| January 29 | Zerobaseone | Prezent | | WakeOne, Lapone | |
| January 31 | All That Remains | Antifragile | Metalcore | | |
| January 31 | Ambrose Akinmusire | Honey from a Winter Stone | | Nonesuch | |
| January 31 | Bonnie "Prince" Billy | The Purple Bird | Folk, country | Domino | |
| January 31 | Brooke Combe | Dancing at the Edge of the World | | Modern Sky Records | |
| January 31 | Circa Waves | Death & Love Pt.1 | | Lower Third, PIAS | |
| January 31 | Cymande | Renascence | | BMG | |
| January 31 | Damon Locks | List of Demands | Jazz, hip-hop, spoken word | International Anthem | |
| January 31 | Ebo Taylor | Ebo Taylor JID022 | | Jazz Is Dead | |
| January 31 | Eddie Chacon | Lay Low | Pop, R&B | Stones Throw | |
| January 31 | EST Gee | I Aint Feeling You | | CMG, Interscope | |
| January 31 | Geologist & D.S. | A Shaw Deal | | Drag City | |
| January 31 | Grayscale | The Hart | Alternative rock, pop-punk | Infield Records | |
| January 31 | The Hellacopters | Overdriver | | Nuclear Blast | |
| January 31 | Joe McPhee | I'm Just Say'n | | Smalltown Supersound | |
| January 31 | L.S. Dunes | Violet | Post-hardcore | Fantasy | |
| January 31 | Lilly Hiatt | Forever | Alternative rock | New West | |
| January 31 | Ludovico Einaudi | The Summer Portraits | | Decca | |
| January 31 | Maribou State | Hallucinating Love | | Ninja Tune | |
| January 31 | Michael Medrano | The Penthouse | | Snafu Records | |
| January 31 | Mike | Showbiz! | Hip-hop | 10k | |
| January 31 | Moe | Circle of Giants | | | |
| January 31 | Pentagram | Lightning in a Bottle | Doom metal, heavy metal | Heavy Psych Sounds Records | |
| January 31 | Røry | Restoration | | Sadcøre Records | |
| January 31 | The Weeknd | Hurry Up Tomorrow | R&B, synth-pop | XO, Republic | |

=== February ===
List of albums released in February 2025
Go to: January | February | March | April | May | June | July | August | September | October | November | December | Back to top
| Release date | Artist | Album | Genre | Label | Ref. |
| February 3 | Ive | Ive Empathy | | Starship | |
| February 5 | Creepy Nuts | Legion | | Onenation, Sony Music Associated | |
| February 7 | Adwaith | Solas | | Libertino Records | |
| February 7 | Biig Piig | 11:11 | | Sony Music | |
| February 7 | Chlothegod | I Feel Different Every Day | | EQT Recordings | |
| February 7 | Dream Theater | Parasomnia | Progressive metal | Inside Out | |
| February 7 | Drop Nineteens | 1991 | Shoegaze | Wharf Cat Records | |
| February 7 | Guided by Voices | Universe Room | | Guided by Voices, Inc. | |
| February 7 | Heartworms | Glutton for Punishment | | Speedy Wunderground | |
| February 7 | Inhaler | Open Wide | | Polydor | |
| February 7 | James Brandon Lewis Trio | Apple Cores | | Anti- | |
| February 7 | Jinjer | Duél | Progressive metal | Napalm | |
| February 7 | Larry June, 2 Chainz and the Alchemist | Life Is Beautiful | Hip-hop | The Freeminded, ALC Records, Empire | |
| February 7 | Nadia Reid | Enter Now Brightness | | Chrysalis | |
| February 7 | Obscura | A Sonication | Progressive death metal, technical death metal | Nuclear Blast | |
| February 7 | Oklou | Choke Enough | Synth-pop, bedroom pop | True Panther Sounds | |
| February 7 | Olly Alexander | Polari | Electropop | Polydor | |
| February 7 | Real Bad Man and Zelooperz | Dear Psilocybin | | Real Bad Man | |
| February 7 | Sharon Van Etten & the Attachment Theory | Sharon Van Etten & the Attachment Theory | Rock | Jagjaguwar | |
| February 7 | Squid | Cowards | Post-rock | Warp | |
| February 7 | Tyga | NSFW | | Last Kings, Empire | |
| February 7 | Wafia | Promised Land | | Heartburn Records | |
| February 7 | Wilder Woods | Curioso | | Dualtone | |
| February 7 | Yung Fazo | Zo | Rage, trap | | |
| February 11 | 88:88 (Boldy James and the Flaurist) | The Exorcism | | | |
| February 11 | Kelela | In the Blue Light | | Warp | |
| February 11 | The Velveteers | A Million Knives | | Easy Eye Sound | |
| February 14 | Alessia Cara | Love & Hyperbole | | Def Jam | |
| February 14 | Bartees Strange | Horror | | 4AD | |
| February 14 | Bill Medley | Straight from the Heart | Country | Curb | |
| February 14 | Bleeding Through | Nine | | SharpTone | |
| February 14 | Brother Ali and Ant | Satisfied Soul | Hip-hop | Mello | |
| February 14 | Horsegirl | Phonetics On and On | | Matador | |
| February 14 | Jisoo | Amortage | Pop | Blissoo, Warner | |
| February 14 | John Glacier | Like a Ribbon | | Young | |
| February 14 | Lacuna Coil | Sleepless Empire | Gothic metal, metalcore | Century Media | |
| February 14 | The Lumineers | Automatic | | Dualtone | |
| February 14 | Mallrat | Light Hit My Face Like a Straight Right | | Dew Process | |
| February 14 | Manic Street Preachers | Critical Thinking | | Columbia | |
| February 14 | Marshall Allen | New Dawn | | Mexican Summer, Week-End | |
| February 14 | Mereba | The Breeze Grew a Fire | Soul, folk-pop | Secretly Canadian | |
| February 14 | Neil Young | Oceanside Countryside | Country | Warner, Reprise | |
| February 14 | PartyNextDoor and Drake | Some Sexy Songs 4 U | R&B | OVO, Santa Anna, Republic | |
| February 14 | Richard Dawson | End of the Middle | | Weird World, Domino | |
| February 14 | Saint Motel | Symphony in the Sky | | Elektra Entertainment | |
| February 14 | Shirin David | Schlau aber Blond | | Juicy Money Records | |
| February 14 | SM Town | 2025 SM Town: The Culture, the Future | | SM | |
| February 14 | Twiztid | Welcome to Your Funeral | | Majik Ninja Entertainment | |
| February 14 | Venturing | Ghostholding | Indie rock, emo, shoegaze | DeadAir | |
| February 14 | The War and Treaty | Plus One | | Mercury Nashville | |
| February 14 | Westside Gunn | 12 | | Griselda | |
| February 14 | Winter and Hooky | Water Season | | Julia's War | |
| February 14 | The Wombats | Oh! The Ocean | Indie rock | AWAL | |
| February 16 | Melvins with Napalm Death | Savage Imperial Death March | | Amphetamine Reptile, Ipecac | |
| February 17 | Eem Triplin | Melody of a Memory | | RCA | |
| February 18 | A Day to Remember | Big Ole Album Vol. 1 | | Fueled by Ramen | |
| February 18 | Durand Bernarr | Bloom | R&B, funk | DSing Records | |
| February 21 | Basia Bulat | Basia's Palace | | Secret City | |
| February 21 | Baths | Gut | Indie rock, electropop | Basement's Basement | |
| February 21 | Dirty Honey | Mayhem and Revelry Live | | Dirt Records | |
| February 21 | Ider | Late to the World | | Nettwerk | |
| February 21 | Jesse Welles | Middle | | | |
| February 21 | Killswitch Engage | This Consequence | Metalcore | Metal Blade | |
| February 21 | Motorpsycho | Motorpsycho | Psychedelic rock, progressive rock, alternative rock | Det Nordenfjeldske, Grammofonselskab | |
| February 21 | The Murder Capital | Blindness | | Human Seasons | |
| February 21 | Nao | Jupiter | | | |
| February 21 | Nardo Wick | Wick | Hip-hop, trap | RCA, Flawless Entertainment | |
| February 21 | One Ok Rock | Detox | | Fueled by Ramen | |
| February 21 | Patterson Hood | Exploding Trees & Airplane Screams | | ATO | |
| February 21 | Porridge Radio | The Machine Starts to Sing | | Secretly Canadian | |
| February 21 | The Reverend Peyton's Big Damn Band | Honeysuckle | | Family Owned Records, Amplified Distribution | |
| February 21 | Saint Jhn | Festival Season | | Godd Complexx | |
| February 21 | Sam Fender | People Watching | | Polydor | |
| February 21 | Saya Gray | Saya | | Dirty Hit | |
| February 21 | Silverstein | Antibloom | | UNFD | |
| February 21 | Sunny War | Armageddon in a Summer Dress | | New West | |
| February 21 | Tate McRae | So Close to What | Pop, R&B | RCA | |
| February 21 | Tim Hecker | Shards | Ambient, experimental | Kranky | |
| February 21 | Youth Lagoon | Rarely Do I Dream | | Fat Possum | |
| February 25 | G-Dragon | Übermensch | | Galaxy Corporation, Empire | |
| February 25 | Senidah | Sen i Dah | | Bassivity Digital | |
| February 25 | Various artists | Is This What We Want? | | VMG | |
| February 27 | Boldy James and Chuck Strangers | Token of Appreciation | | | |
| February 27 | Mae Martin | I'm a TV | | Universal Music Canada | |
| February 27 | Rebecca Black | Salvation | Pop | Rebecca Black | |
| February 28 | 1900Rugrat | Porch 2 the Pent | Hip-hop | 300 | |
| February 28 | Aloe Blacc | Stand Together | | Grand Scheme Productions | |
| February 28 | Andy Bell | Pinball Wanderer | | Sonic Cathedral | |
| February 28 | Antony Szmierek | Service Station at the End of the Universe | | Mushroom Music | |
| February 28 | Architects | The Sky, the Earth & All Between | Metalcore, alternative metal | Epitaph | |
| February 28 | Avantasia | Here Be Dragons | | Napalm | |
| February 28 | Banks | Off with Her Head | Alternative pop, R&B | ADA Worldwide | |
| February 28 | Bdrmm | Microtonic | Electronic | Rock Action | |
| February 28 | Brainstorm | Plague of Rats | Heavy metal, power metal | Reigning Phoenix | |
| February 28 | Brett Kissel | Let Your Horses Run – The Album | Country | Big Star Recordings | |
| February 28 | Constant Follower | The Smile You Send Out Returns to You | Neofolk, slowcore | Last Night from Glasgow, Golden Hum Recordings | |
| February 28 | The Chills | Spring Board: The Early Unrecorded Songs | | Flying Nun | |
| February 28 | Darkside | Nothing | Electronic, art rock | Matador | |
| February 28 | Deep Sea Diver | Billboard Heart | Dream pop, indie rock | Sub Pop | |
| February 28 | The Devil Makes Three | Spirits | Americana | New West | |
| February 28 | Doves | Constellations for the Lonely | | EMI North | |
| February 28 | Eric Bass | I Had a Name | | | |
| February 28 | Everything Is Recorded | Temporary | | XL | |
| February 28 | Hirax | Faster than Death | | Armageddon Label | |
| February 28 | Hope Tala | Hope Handwritten | R&B, bossa nova, pop | PMR | |
| February 28 | Ichiko Aoba | Luminescent Creatures | | Hermine | |
| February 28 | John Lee Hooker | The Standard School Broadcast | | BMG | |
| February 28 | The Lathums | Matter Does Not Define | | Modern Sky UK | |
| February 28 | Lisa | Alter Ego | | Lloud, RCA | |
| February 28 | Marie Davidson | City of Clowns | Techno, experimental pop | Deewee | |
| February 28 | Max Cooper | On Being | | | |
| February 28 | Mdou Moctar | Tears of Injustice | | Matador | |
| February 28 | Miya Folick | Erotica Veronica | | Nettwerk | |
| February 28 | Panda Bear | Sinister Grift | Psychedelic pop, tropical rock | Domino | |
| February 28 | serpentwithfeet | Grip Sequel | | Secretly Canadian | |
| February 28 | Shygirl | Club Shy Room 2 | | Because | |
| February 28 | Split Dogs | Here to Destroy | Rock | Venn Records | |
| February 28 | Tori Amos | The Music of Tori and the Muses | | Universal, Faerie Workshop Rekords | |
| February 28 | Yazz Ahmed | A Paradise in the Hold | | Night Time Stories | |

=== March ===
List of albums released in March 2025
Go to: January | February | March | April | May | June | July | August | September | October | November | December | Back to top
| Release date | Artist | Album | Genre | Label | Ref. |
| March 7 | Alabaster DePlume | A Blade Because a Blade Is Whole | | International Anthem | |
| March 7 | Astropical (Bomba Estéreo and Rawayana) | Astropical | | Sony Music | |
| March 7 | Bob Mould | Here We Go Crazy | Power pop | Granary, BMG | |
| March 7 | Circuit des Yeux | Halo on the Inside | | Matador | |
| March 7 | Clara Mann | Rift | | state51 | |
| March 7 | Daniel Seavey | Second Wind | | | |
| March 7 | Destruction | Birth of Malice | | Napalm | |
| March 7 | Divorce | Drive to Goldenhammer | Alternative country, garage rock | Gravity, Capitol | |
| March 7 | Hamilton Leithauser | This Side of the Island | Pop | Glassnote | |
| March 7 | HotWax | Hot Shock | Rock and roll | Marathon Artists | |
| March 7 | Jason Isbell | Foxes in the Snow | | Southeastern | |
| March 7 | JB Dunckel and Jonathan Fitoussi | Mirages II | | Prototyp Recording | |
| March 7 | Jennie | Ruby | Pop, hip-hop, R&B | Odd Atelier, Columbia | |
| March 7 | Jethro Tull | Curious Ruminant | | Inside Out Music | |
| March 7 | Lady Gaga | Mayhem | Pop | Streamline Records, Interscope | |
| March 7 | Mike Farris | The Sound of Muscle Shoals | | Fame Records | |
| March 7 | Sasami | Blood on the Silver Screen | | Domino | |
| March 7 | Spiritbox | Tsunami Sea | Metalcore, alternative metal, progressive metal | Pale Chord, Rise | |
| March 7 | Tokimonsta | Eternal Reverie | | Young Art Records | |
| March 7 | Tory Lanez | Peterson | | One Umbrella Records | |
| March 7 | The Tubs | Cotton Crown | Jangle pop, punk rock | Trouble in Mind | |
| March 7 | Vundabar | Surgery and Pleasure | | Loma Vista | |
| March 7 | Whitechapel | Hymns in Dissonance | Deathcore | Metal Blade | |
| March 7 | The Wiggles | Wiggle Up, Giddy Up | Country | ABC | |
| March 7 | The Wildhearts | Satanic Rites of the Wildhearts | | Snakefarm | |
| March 7 | Will Stratton | Points of Origin | | Ruination Record Co., Bella Union | |
| March 10 | Yeji | Air | K-pop | JYP, Republic | |
| March 13 | Huremic | Seeking Darkness | Post-rock, noise rock, experimental rock | Huremic | |
| March 14 | Anoushka Shankar | Chapter III: We Return to Light | | | |
| March 14 | Bambara | Birthmarks | | Bella Union, Wharf Cat | |
| March 14 | The Body and Intensive Care | Was I Good Enough? | | Closed Casket Activities | |
| March 14 | Charley Crockett | Lonesome Drifter | Country blues | Island | |
| March 14 | Clipping | Dead Channel Sky | | Sub Pop | |
| March 14 | Coheed and Cambria | Vaxis – Act III: The Father of Make Believe | | Virgin | |
| March 14 | Courting | Lust for Life, Or: 'How to Thread the Needle and Come Out the Other Side to Tell the Story' | Electronica, proto-punk | Lower Third Records, PIAS | |
| March 14 | Dorothy | The Way | | Roc Nation | |
| March 14 | Edwyn Collins | Nation Shall Speak Unto Nation | Pop | AED | |
| March 14 | Eisbrecher | Kaltfront | | Metropolis | |
| March 14 | Envy of None | Stygian Wavz | | Kscope | |
| March 14 | Kronos Quartet and Mary Kouyoumdjian | Witness | | Phenotypic Recordings | |
| March 14 | The Loft | Everything Changes, Everything Stays the Same | | Tapete | |
| March 14 | Mia Wray | Hi, It's Nice to Meet Me | | Mushroom | |
| March 14 | Nels Cline | Consentrik Quartet | | Blue Note | |
| March 14 | Playboi Carti | Music | Trap | AWGE, Interscope | |
| March 14 | Rose Cousins | Conditions of Love - Vol 1 | | Nettwerk | |
| March 14 | Steven Wilson | The Overview | | Fiction | |
| March 14 | Throwing Muses | Moonlight Concessions | | Fire | |
| March 14 | Warbringer | Wrath and Ruin | Thrash metal | Napalm | |
| March 14 | Whatever the Weather | Whatever the Weather II | Ambient | Ghostly International | |
| March 14 | ZZ Ward | Liberation | | Sun | |
| March 17 | Nmixx | Fe3O4: Forward | | JYP, Republic | |
| March 18 | Saba and No I.D. | From the Private Collection of Saba and No I.D. | | From the Private Collection, LLP | |
| March 19 | Flying Lotus | Ash (Original Motion Picture Soundtrack) | | Milan | |
| March 19 | Kevin Gates | I'm Him 2 | | Bread Winner's Alumni, APG | |
| March 19 | Men I Trust | Equus Asinus | | | |
| March 19 | Weatherday | Hornet Disaster | | Topshelf | |
| March 20 | Brian D'Addario | Till the Morning | | Headstack Records | |
| March 20 | Brian D'Addario | Till the Morning | | Headstack Records | |
| March 20 | Brian Eno | Aurum | | Opal Records | |
| March 21 | Annie and the Caldwells | Can't Lose My (Soul) | Gospel, soul | Luaka Bop | |
| March 21 | Benefits | Constant Noise | | Invada | |
| March 21 | Cradle of Filth | The Screaming of the Valkyries | | Napalm | |
| March 21 | Deacon Blue | The Great Western Road | | Cooking Vinyl | |
| March 21 | Dutch Interior | Moneyball | Country rock | Fat Possum | |
| March 21 | Gotthard | Stereo Crush | Hard rock | Reigning Phoenix | |
| March 21 | Greentea Peng | Tell Dem It's Sunny | | AWAL | |
| March 21 | The Horrors | Night Life | Post-punk | Fiction | |
| March 21 | Imperial Triumphant | Goldstar | Avant-garde metal, blackened death metal | Century Media | |
| March 21 | Japanese Breakfast | For Melancholy Brunettes (& Sad Women) | Indie pop | Dead Oceans | |
| March 21 | Jeffrey Lewis | The Even More Freewheelin' Jeffrey Lewis | | Don Giovanni | |
| March 21 | Kyle M | The Real Me | | Stones Throw | |
| March 21 | Lonnie Holley | Tonky | | Jagjaguwar | |
| March 21 | Lordi | Limited Deadition | | Reigning Phoenix | |
| March 21 | Lucio Corsi | Volevo essere un duro | | Sugar Music | |
| March 21 | Macie Stewart | When the Distance Is Blue | | International Anthem | |
| March 21 | More Eaze and Claire Rousay | No Floor | | Thrill Jockey | |
| March 21 | My Morning Jacket | Is | | ATO | |
| March 21 | Old Mervs | Old Mervs | | Dew Process | |
| March 21 | Pictoria Vark | Nothing Sticks | Indie rock | Get Better | |
| March 21 | Pop Evil | What Remains | | MNRK | |
| March 21 | Psyclon Nine | And Then Oblivion | Industrial metal | Metropolis | |
| March 21 | Selena Gomez and Benny Blanco | I Said I Love You First | Pop | Interscope, SMG Music, Friends Keep Secrets Records | |
| March 21 | Stray Kids | Mixtape: Dominate | | JYP, Republic | |
| March 21 | Tamino | Every Dawn's a Mountain | | Communion | |
| March 21 | Tauren Wells | Let the Church Sing | | Sparrow, Capitol CMG | |
| March 21 | Vijay Iyer and Wadada Leo Smith | Defiant Life | | ECM | |
| March 21 | YHWH Nailgun | 45 Pounds | Post-punk, punk funk, experimental rock | AD 93 | |
| March 22 | KRS-One | Temple of Hip Hop Global Awareness | | R.A.M.P Ent Agency | |
| March 22 | Los Thuthanaka (Chuquimamani-Condori and Joshua Chuquimia Crampton) | Los Thuthanaka | | Los Thuthanaka | |
| March 26 | @onefive | More Than Kawaii | J-pop, hip-hop | Avex Trax | |
| March 28 | Alien Weaponry | Te Rā | | Napalm | |
| March 28 | Alison Krauss & Union Station | Arcadia | | Down the Road Records | |
| March 28 | Arch Enemy | Blood Dynasty | | Century Media | |
| March 28 | Backxwash | Only Dust Remains | Conscious hip-hop, alternative hip-hop | Ugly Hag Records | |
| March 28 | The Blue Stones | Metro | | New Weapon Records | |
| March 28 | Boldy James and Antt Beatz | Hommage | | Empire | |
| March 28 | Branford Marsalis Quartet | Belonging | | Blue Note | |
| March 28 | Brkn Love | The Program | | Spinefarm | |
| March 28 | Bryan Ferry and Amelia Barratt | Loose Talk | | Dene Jesmond | |
| March 28 | Butcher Brown | Letters from the Atlantic | | | |
| March 28 | Chloe Moriondo | Oyster | Glitch pop, hyperpop | Public Consumption, Atlantic | |
| March 28 | CocoRosie | Little Death Wishes | | Joyful Noise | |
| March 28 | The Darkness | Dreams on Toast | | Cooking Vinyl | |
| March 28 | Deafheaven | Lonely People with Power | Blackgaze, black metal | Roadrunner | |
| March 28 | Dean Wareham | That's the Price of Loving Me | | Carpark | |
| March 28 | Destroyer | Dan's Boogie | | Merge | |
| March 28 | Great Grandpa | Patience, Moonbeam | Indie rock | Run for Cover | |
| March 28 | Grentperez | Backflips in a Restaurant | | Fast Friends | |
| March 28 | Hannah Cohen | Earthstar Mountain | | Bella Union, Congrats Records | |
| March 28 | Jessie Reyez | Paid in Memories | | FMLY, Island | |
| March 28 | Kevin Drumm | Sheer Hellish Miasma II | | Erstwhile | |
| March 28 | Lil Durk | Deep Thoughts | | Alamo | |
| March 28 | Liz Stringer | The Second High | | Dot Dash | |
| March 28 | Lucy Dacus | Forever Is a Feeling | Indie rock | Geffen | |
| March 28 | Maya Delilah | The Long Way Round | | Blue Note, Capitol | |
| March 28 | Memphis May Fire | Shapeshifter | | Rise | |
| March 28 | Ministry | The Squirrely Years Revisited | | Cleopatra | |
| March 28 | Mumford & Sons | Rushmere | Folk rock | Island, Glassnote | |
| March 28 | Nav | OMW2 Rexdale | | XO, Republic | |
| March 28 | Perfume Genius | Glory | | Matador | |
| March 28 | Peter Capaldi | Sweet Illusions | Rock | Last Night from Glasgow | |
| March 28 | Polo & Pan | 22:22 | | Hamburger Records | |
| March 28 | Sacred Paws | Jump Into Life | Pop, indie rock | Merge | |
| March 28 | Sandwell District | End Beginnings | Techno | The Point of Departure Recording Company | |
| March 28 | Snapped Ankles | Hard Times Furious Dancing | | The Leaf Label | |
| March 28 | Spellling | Portrait of My Heart | | Sacred Bones | |
| March 28 | Underoath | The Place After This One | | MNRK Heavy | |
| March 28 | Unknown Mortal Orchestra | IC-02 Bogotá | | Jagjaguwar | |
| March 28 | Will Smith | Based on a True Story | | Slang Recordings | |
| March 28 | Yukimi | For You | | Ninja Tune | |
| March 31 | Marina Sena | Coisas Naturais | MPB | Sony Music | |
| March 31 | Nine Vicious | Tumblr Music | | | |

== Second quarter ==
=== April ===
List of albums released in April 2025
Go to: January | February | March | April | May | June | July | August | September | October | November | December | Back to top
| Release date | Artist | Album | Genre | Label | Ref. |
| April 1 | Skrillex | Fuck U Skrillex You Think Ur Andy Warhol but Ur Not!! <3 | Dubstep, drum and bass, UK garage | Owsla, Atlantic | |
| April 2 | Duckwrth | All-American Fuckboy | | Them Hellas, The Blind Youth | |
| April 3 | Barker | Stochastic Drift | Pop | Smalltown Supersound | |
| April 3 | Black Sherif | Iron Boy | Hip-hop, Afrobeats, highlife | Blacko Management, Empire | |
| April 4 | 2hollis | Star | EDM, electropop, trap | Polydor, Interscope | |
| April 4 | Allegaeon | The Ossuary Lens | | Metal Blade | |
| April 4 | Anika | Abyss | | Sacred Bones | |
| April 4 | Babe Rainbow | Slipper Imp and Shakaerator | | p(doom) | |
| April 4 | Ball Park Music | Like Love | | Prawn Records | |
| April 4 | Black Country, New Road | Forever Howlong | Alternative rock, folk, baroque pop | Ninja Tune | |
| April 4 | Bleed from Within | Zenith | Metalcore, melodic death metal, groove metal | Nuclear Blast | |
| April 4 | Boldy James and V Don | Alphabet Highway | | RRC Music Co., Serious Soundz | |
| April 4 | Brown Horse | All the Right Weaknesses | Country rock | Loose | |
| April 4 | Craig Finn | Always Been | | Tamarac Records | |
| April 4 | Dirty Projectors and Stargaze | Song of the Earth | | Nonesuch, New Amsterdam, Transgressive | |
| April 4 | DJ Koze | Music Can Hear Us | Electropop, house, techno | Pampa Records | |
| April 4 | Djo | The Crux | Pop rock, indie rock | AWAL, Djo Music | |
| April 4 | Elton John and Brandi Carlile | Who Believes in Angels? | | Interscope | |
| April 4 | Florist | Jellywish | Folk | Double Double Whammy | |
| April 4 | Grace VanderWaal | Childstar | Indie pop | Pulse Records | |
| April 4 | Infinity Knives with Brian Ennals | A City Drowned in God's Black Tears | | Phantom Limb Records | |
| April 4 | Jane Remover | Revengeseekerz | Hyperpop | DeadAir | |
| April 4 | John Williamson | How Many Songs | | Warner Music Australia | |
| April 4 | L.A. Guns | Leopard Skin | | Cleopatra | |
| April 4 | L.A. Witch | Doggod | | Suicide Squeeze | |
| April 4 | Lily Seabird | Trash Mountain | | Lame-O | |
| April 4 | Magnolia Park | Vamp | | Epitaph | |
| April 4 | Malcolm Todd | Malcolm Todd | Alternative R&B, indie pop | Columbia | |
| April 4 | Marlon Williams | Te Whare Tīwekaweka | | Universal Music New Zealand | |
| April 4 | The Mekons | Horror | | Fire | |
| April 4 | Miki Berenyi Trio | Tripla | Shoegaze, dream pop | Bella Union | |
| April 4 | Momma | Welcome to My Blue Sky | | Polyvinyl, Lucky Number | |
| April 4 | The Ophelias | Spring Grove | Indie rock, indie folk | Get Better | |
| April 4 | Panchiko | Ginkgo | Indie rock, art rock, neo-psychedelia | Nettwerk | |
| April 4 | Pigs Pigs Pigs Pigs Pigs Pigs Pigs | Death Hilarious | Sludge metal | Missing Piece Records | |
| April 4 | Rachel Chinouriri | Little House | | Parlophone | |
| April 4 | Scowl | Are We All Angels | | Dead Oceans | |
| April 4 | Shoreline Mafia | Back in Bidness | | 300, Atlantic | |
| April 4 | Sleigh Bells | Bunky Becky Birthday Boy | Pop-punk, pop metal | Mom + Pop | |
| April 4 | Smith/Kotzen | Black Light/White Noise | Hard rock, blues rock | BMG | |
| April 4 | Thornhill | Bodies | | UNFD | |
| April 4 | The Waterboys | Life, Death and Dennis Hopper | | Sun | |
| April 4 | Xikers | House of Tricky: Spur | | KQ Entertainment | |
| April 4 | Yann Tiersen | Rathlin from a Distance | The Liquid Hour | | Mute | |
| April 9 | Cold Specks | Light for the Midnight | | Mute | |
| April 11 | Bliss n Eso | The Moon (The Light Side) | | Flight Deck, Mushroom Music | |
| April 11 | Bon Iver | Sable, Fable | R&B, soft rock, pop | Jagjaguwar | |
| April 11 | Bootsy Collins | Album of the Year #1 Funkateer | | Bootzilla Records | |
| April 11 | Daughter of Swords | Alex | Indie pop | Psychic Hotline | |
| April 11 | Dream Evil | Thunder in the Night | Power metal, heavy metal | Century Media | |
| April 11 | The Driver Era | Obsession | Rock, electropop | Too Records | |
| April 11 | Epica | Aspiral | | Nuclear Blast | |
| April 11 | Flummox | Southern Progress | | Needlejuice | |
| April 11 | Galactic and Irma Thomas | Audience with the Queen | | Tchuop-Zilla Records | |
| April 11 | Jon Pardi | Honkytonk Hollywood | Country | Capitol Nashville | |
| April 11 | Ken Carson | More Chaos | Rage, trap | Opium, Interscope | |
| April 11 | Mamalarky | Hex Key | | Epitaph | |
| April 11 | The Mars Volta | Lucro Sucio; Los Ojos del Vacio | | Clouds Hill | |
| April 11 | Nell Smith | Anxious | Psychedelic pop, indie pop | Bella Union | |
| April 11 | OK Go | And the Adjacent Possible | | Paracadute | |
| April 11 | Röyksopp | True Electric | | Dog Triumph | |
| April 11 | Sign Crushes Motorist and KayCyy | Saddest Truth | | BuVision Entertainment, Columbia | |
| April 11 | Spin Doctors | Face Full of Cake | | Capitol | |
| April 11 | Teen Mortgage | Devil Ultrasonic Dream | | Roadrunner | |
| April 11 | Valerie June | Owls, Omens and Oracles | Pop | Concord | |
| April 11 | Within Destruction | Animetal | Nu metal, metalcore, death metal | Sumerian | |
| April 12 | Elton John | Live from the Rainbow Theatre | | Universal | |
| April 12 | Jeff Bridges | Slow Magic: 1977-1978 | | Light in the Attic | |
| April 12 | Sly and the Family Stone | The First Family: Live at Winchester Cathedral 1967 | | High Moon | |
| April 12 | Wu-Tang Clan and Mathematics | Black Samson, the Bastard Swordsman | | Ruffnation Entertainment | |
| April 16 | Real Lies | We Will Annihilate Our Enemies | | Tonal Records | |
| April 18 | Beddy Rays | Do What Ya Wanna | | Beddy Rays | |
| April 18 | Beirut | A Study of Losses | Orchestral pop | Pompeii | |
| April 18 | Dave Blunts | You Can't Say That | | Listen to the Kids | |
| April 18 | Davido | 5ive | Afropop | DMW, Columbia | |
| April 18 | Divide and Dissolve | Insatiable | | Bella Union | |
| April 18 | Hawkwind | There Is No Space for Us | | Cherry Red | |
| April 18 | Isabel LaRosa | Raven | | RCA, Slumbo Labs | |
| April 18 | Julien Baker & Torres | Send a Prayer My Way | Country | Matador | |
| April 18 | Keri Hilson | We Need to Talk: Love | | Audible Art Club, Create | |
| April 18 | Mayday Parade | Sweet | | Many Hat Endeavors | |
| April 18 | Melvins | Thunderball | Sludge metal, alternative metal, doom metal | Ipecac | |
| April 18 | Quickly, Quickly | I Heard That Noise | Art pop, indie folk, indie pop | Ghostly International | |
| April 18 | Stela Cole | I Die Where You Begin | | Stelavision Records | |
| April 18 | Superheaven | Superheaven | | Blue Grape Music | |
| April 18 | That Mexican OT and Sauce Walka | Chicken & Sauce | | STB Entertainment | |
| April 18 | Too Short | Sir Too Short, Vol. 1 (Freaky Tales) | | Empire | |
| April 18 | Tunde Adebimpe | Thee Black Boltz | | Sub Pop | |
| April 18 | Westside Gunn | Heels Have Eyes | | Griselda, Roc Nation | |
| April 18 | Wiz Khalifa | Kush + Orange Juice 2 | | Taylor Gang, BMG | |
| April 19 | Idris Ackamoor | Artistic Being | | Strut | |
| April 19 | Sault | 10 | | Forever Living Originals | |
| April 23 | Alexandros | Provoke | Alternative rock, pop-punk, experimental rock | Polydor, RX-Records, Universal Japan | |
| April 23 | Ave Mujica | Completeness | Anime song | Bushiroad Music | |
| April 23 | Javiera Mena | Inmersión | Dream pop, Latin pop | Géiser Discos | |
| April 24 | Adrianne Lenker | Live at Revolution Hall | | 4AD | |
| April 24 | Natalia Lafourcade | Cancionera | | Sony Music Mexico | |
| April 25 | Amy Irving | Always Will Be | | Queen of the Castle Records, Missing Piece Records | |
| April 25 | Beach Bunny | Tunnel Vision | Indie pop, indie rock | AWAL | |
| April 25 | Big Brave | OST | | Thrill Jockey | |
| April 25 | Billy Idol | Dream Into It | Punk rock, new wave | Dark Horse, BMG | |
| April 25 | Broncho | Natural Pleasure | Shoegaze, indie rock | Kung Fu | |
| April 25 | Caliban | Back from Hell | Metalcore | Century Media | |
| April 25 | Candice Night | Sea Glass | earMUSIC | Pop rock, folk rock | |
| April 25 | Cloth | Pink Silence | | Rock Action | |
| April 25 | Coco Jones | Why Not More? | R&B | High Standardz, Def Jam | |
| April 25 | Colin Miller | Losin' | | Mtn Laurel Recording Co. | |
| April 25 | Conan | Violence Dimension | | Heavy Psych Sounds | |
| April 25 | D4vd | Withered | Alt-R&B, indie pop, bedroom pop | Darkroom, Interscope | |
| April 25 | DeathbyRomy | Hollywood Forever | | DeathbyRomy | |
| April 25 | Deerhoof | Noble and Godlike in Ruin | Experimental rock | Joyful Noise | |
| April 25 | Destin Conrad | Love on Digital | Alternative R&B | Empire | |
| April 25 | Djrum | Under Tangled Silence | Electronic | Houndstooth | |
| April 25 | Eluveitie | Ànv | Folk metal, melodic death metal, Celtic metal | Nuclear Blast | |
| April 25 | Emma-Jean Thackray | Weirdo | | Brownswood, Parlophone | |
| April 25 | Femi Kuti | Journey Through Life | | Partisan | |
| April 25 | Fly Anakin | The Forever Dream | Hip-hop | Lex | |
| April 25 | Ghost | Skeletá | | Loma Vista | |
| April 25 | Gigi Perez | At the Beach, in Every Life | | Island, Universal Music Ireland | |
| April 25 | Goose | Everything Must Go | | No Coincidence Records | |
| April 25 | Heart Attack Man | Joyride the Pale Horse | | | |
| April 25 | Inhuman Nature | Greater Than Death | Death metal, thrash metal | Church Road | |
| April 25 | James Arthur | Pisces | Pop rock | Columbia | |
| April 25 | Jeff Goldblum & the Mildred Snitzer Orchestra | Still Blooming | Jazz | Decca | |
| April 25 | Jensen McRae | I Don't Know How but They Found Me! | | Dead Oceans | |
| April 25 | Joe Lovano | Homage | Jazz | ECM | |
| April 25 | Landmvrks | The Darkest Place I've Ever Been | | Arising Empire | |
| April 25 | Ledisi | The Crown | R&B | Listen Back Entertainment | |
| April 25 | Lyn Lapid | Buzzkill | Indie pop | Mercury | |
| April 25 | Machine Head | Unatoned | Groove metal, alternative metal | Nuclear Blast, Imperium Recordings | |
| April 25 | Maria Somerville | Luster | Shoegaze, folk, dream pop | 4AD | |
| April 25 | Marina Satti | Pop Too | | Minos EMI | |
| April 25 | The Moonlandingz | No Rocket Required | Pop | Transgressive | |
| April 25 | Night Move | Double Life | | Domino | |
| April 25 | Nikolija | Sila | | Made In BLKN | |
| April 25 | Prima Queen | The Prize | Indie pop | Submarine Cat | |
| April 25 | The Raveonettes | Pe'ahi II | | Beat Dies Records | |
| April 25 | Rialto | Neon & Ghost Signs | | Fierce Panda | |
| April 25 | Samantha Fish | Paper Doll | | Rounder | |
| April 25 | Samia | Bloodless | | Grand Jury Music | |
| April 25 | SB19 | Simula at Wakas | | Sony Music Philippines | |
| April 25 | Self Esteem | A Complicated Woman | | Polydor | |
| April 25 | Smokey Robinson | What the World Needs Now | | Gaither Music Company | |
| April 25 | Southern Avenue | Family | | Alligator | |
| April 25 | Stereophonics | Make 'Em Laugh, Make 'Em Cry, Make 'Em Wait | | EMI | |
| April 25 | Sumac and Moor Mother | The Film | Heavy metal | Thrill Jockey | |
| April 25 | Sunflower Bean | Mortal Primetime | Indie pop, alternative rock | Lucky Number Records | |
| April 25 | Tennis | Face Down in the Garden | | Mutually Detrimental | |
| April 25 | Uwade | Florilegium | | Ehiose Records, Thirty Tigers | |
| April 25 | Various artists | Heart of Gold: The Songs of Neil Young Vol. 1 | | Cinema Music Group, Killphonic Records | |
| April 25 | Viagra Boys | Viagr Aboys | | Shrimptech Enterprises | |
| April 25 | Wednesday 13 | Mid Death Crisis | | Napalm | |
| April 25 | William Tyler | Time Indefinite | | Psychic Hotline | |
| April 25 | Willie Nelson | Oh What a Beautiful World | Country | Legacy | |
| April 25 | Wishy | Planet Popstar | | Winspear | |
| April 26 | DaBaby | Please Say DaBaby, Vol. 1 | | LiveMixtapes | |
| April 27 | Snoop Dogg | Altar Call | | Death Row | |
| April 30 | Lali | No Vayas a Atender Cuando el Demonio Llama | Pop, rock, electropop | Sony Argentina | |
| April 30 | Lloyd Banks | A.O.N. 3: Despite My Mistakes | | Money by Any Means, Inc. | |
| April 30 | Sakurazaka46 | Addiction | | Sony Music Japan | |

=== May ===
List of albums released in May 2025
Go to: January | February | March | April | May | June | July | August | September | October | November | December | Back to top
| Release date | Artist | Album | Genre | Label | Ref. |
| May 2 | Tha Alkaholiks | Daaam! | | Cleopatra | |
| May 2 | Aly & AJ | Silver Deliverer | | Aly & AJ Music | |
| May 2 | Andy Bell | Ten Crowns | Eurodisco, gospel | Crown Recordings | |
| May 2 | Anthony Naples | Scanners | | ANS Records | |
| May 2 | Benny the Butcher | Excelsior | | Black Soprano Family | |
| May 2 | Blondshell | If You Asked for a Picture | Indie rock | Partisan | |
| May 2 | Boldy James and Real Bad Man | Conversational Pieces | | Real Bad Man | |
| May 2 | Briston Maroney | Jimmy | | Atlantic | |
| May 2 | Car Seat Headrest | The Scholars | | Matador | |
| May 2 | DDG | Blame the Chat | | Epic | |
| May 2 | Dope Lemon | Golden Wolf | | BMG | |
| May 2 | Eric Church | Evangeline vs. the Machine | | EMI Nashville | |
| May 2 | Esther Rose | Want | Alternative country rock, pop | New West | |
| May 2 | The Farm | Let the Music (Take Control) | | Modern Sky Records | |
| May 2 | The Flower Kings | Love | Progressive rock | Inside Out Music | |
| May 2 | Flume and JPEGMafia | We Live in a Society | | Flume | |
| May 2 | Fuerza Regida | 111xpantia | Regional Mexican, country, reggaeton | Rancho Humilde, Street Mob Records, Sony Music Latin | |
| May 2 | Hate | Bellum Regiis | | Metal Blade | |
| May 2 | I-dle | We Are I-dle | | Cube | |
| May 2 | Isaiah Falls | LVRS Paradise | R&B | LVRS Only, Roc Nation | |
| May 2 | James Krivchenia | Performing Belief | | Planet Mu | |
| May 2 | Jenny Hval | Iris Silver Mist | Art pop | 4AD | |
| May 2 | Key Glock | Glockaveli | | Paper Route Empire, Republic | |
| May 2 | Lael Neale | Altogether Stranger | Rock | Sub Pop | |
| May 2 | Låpsley | I'm a Hurricane I'm a Woman in Love | | Her Own Recordings | |
| May 2 | Lights | A6 | | Lights Music Inc. | |
| May 2 | Loscil | Lake Fire | | Kranky | |
| May 2 | Lucius | Lucius | | Fantasy | |
| May 2 | Maddie & Tae | Love & Light | | Mercury Nashville | |
| May 2 | Mei Semones | Animaru | J-pop, bossa nova, indie | Bayonet | |
| May 2 | Model/Actriz | Pirouette | Dance-punk, noise rock | True Panther | |
| May 2 | Pet Symmetry | Big Symmetry | | Storm Chasers LTD, Asian Man | |
| May 2 | The Pharcyde | Timeless | | 88rising | |
| May 2 | Press Club | To All the Ones That I Love | | | |
| May 2 | Propagandhi | At Peace | | Epitaph | |
| May 2 | Puddle of Mudd | Kiss the Machine | | Pavement Entertainment | |
| May 2 | PUP | Who Will Look After the Dogs? | | Rise, Little Dipper | |
| May 2 | Sally Potter | Anatomy | | Bella Union | |
| May 2 | Samantha Crain | Gumshoe | Folk rock | Real Kind Records | |
| May 2 | Sextile | Yes, Please. | | Sacred Bones | |
| May 2 | Suzanne Vega | Flying with Angels | | Cooking Vinyl | |
| May 2 | Wretch 32 | Home? | | AWAL | |
| May 2 | Yung Lean | Jonatan | Indie rock, art pop, electronica | World Affairs | |
| May 5 | André 3000 | 7 Piano Sketches | Instrumental, lo-fi | Epic | |
| May 6 | Men I Trust | Equus Callabus | | | |
| May 7 | Mike and Tony Seltzer | Pinball II | Hip-hop | 10k Records | |
| May 8 | Erika de Casier | Lifetime | Trip hop | Independent Jeep Music | |
| May 9 | The Amazons | 21st Century Fiction | Alternative rock, hard rock | Nettwerk | |
| May 9 | Arcade Fire | Pink Elephant | | Columbia | |
| May 9 | Behemoth | The Shit Ov God | Black metal | Nuclear Blast | |
| May 9 | Billy Woods | Golliwog | Horrorcore | Backwoodz Studioz | |
| May 9 | Blake Shelton | For Recreational Use Only | Country | Wheelhouse | |
| May 9 | Counting Crows | Butter Miracle, The Complete Sweets! | | BMG | |
| May 9 | Cuco | Ridin' | | | |
| May 9 | Deradoorian | Ready for Heaven | Pop | Fire | |
| May 9 | Forrest Frank | Child of God II | | River House Records | |
| May 9 | Ghost Bath | Rose Thorn Necklace | Metal | Nuclear Blast | |
| May 9 | The Head and the Heart | Aperture | | Verve Forecast | |
| May 9 | Hedvig Mollestad Trio | Bees in the Bonnet | | Rune Grammofon | |
| May 9 | Holy Holy | Sweet Bitter Sweet | | Wonderlick, Sony Music Australia | |
| May 9 | I'm with Her | Wild and Clear and Blue | | Rounder, Universal | |
| May 9 | John McKay | Sixes and Sevens | Post-punk | Tiny Global Productions | |
| May 9 | Kali Uchis | Sincerely | Neo soul, dream pop, R&B | Capitol | |
| May 9 | Kara-Lis Coverdale | From Where You Came | | Smalltown Supersound | |
| May 9 | The Kooks | Never/Know | | VMG | |
| May 9 | Lefty Gunplay and JasonMartin | Can't Get Right | | OTR Records, 50million, Empire | |
| May 9 | Little Feat | Strike Up the Band | | Hot Tomato Records | |
| May 9 | M83 | A Necessary Escape | | Other Suns | |
| May 9 | Maren Morris | Dreamsicle | | Columbia | |
| May 9 | Mark Pritchard and Thom Yorke | Tall Tales | Electronic | Warp | |
| May 9 | Mclusky | The World Is Still Here and So Are We | | Ipecac | |
| May 9 | Nils Frahm | Night | | Manners McDade Music Publishing Ltd | |
| May 9 | Peter Murphy | Silver Shade | | Metropolis | |
| May 9 | PinkPantheress | Fancy That | | Warner UK | |
| May 9 | Preoccupations | Ill at Ease | | Born Losers Records | |
| May 9 | Sailorr | From Florida's Finest | | BuVision | |
| May 9 | Sleep Token | Even in Arcadia | Alternative metal, alternative R&B, djent | RCA | |
| May 9 | Spacey Jane | If That Makes Sense | Indie rock | AWAL | |
| May 9 | Tetrarch | The Ugly Side of Me | | Napalm | |
| May 12 | Meovv | My Eyes Open VVide | | The Black Label | |
| May 15 | Psychedelic Porn Crumpets | Carpe Diem, Moonman | | What Reality?, Marathon Artists | |
| May 15 | Snoop Dogg | Iz It a Crime? | | Death Row | |
| May 16 | Alexandra Savior | Beneath the Lilypad | Chamber pop, art pop | RCA | |
| May 16 | Aminé | 13 Months of Sunshine | Hip-hop | 10K | |
| May 16 | Arm's Length | There's a Whole World Out There | | Pure Noise | |
| May 16 | Billy Nomates | Metalhorse | | Invada | |
| May 16 | Bury Tomorrow | Will You Haunt Me, with That Same Patience | Metalcore | Music for Nations | |
| May 16 | Carolyn Wonderland | Truth Is | | Alligator | |
| May 16 | The Callous Daoboys | I Don't Want to See You in Heaven | Metalcore | MNRK Heavy | |
| May 16 | Charlie Musselwhite | Look Out Highway | | Forty Below Records | |
| May 16 | Chuck D | Radio Armageddon | | Def Jam | |
| May 16 | Damiano David | Funny Little Fears | Pop, pop rock | Sony Music Italy, Arista | |
| May 16 | Dan Mangan | Natural Light | Indie folk, indie rock | Arts & Crafts | |
| May 16 | Death Before Dishonor | Nowhere Bound | Hardcore punk | Bridge 9 | |
| May 16 | Ezra Furman | Goodbye Small Head | | Bella Union | |
| May 16 | Friendship | Caveman Wakes Up | Indie rock | Merge | |
| May 16 | Grails | Miracle Music | | Temporary Residence | |
| May 16 | Guitarricadelafuente | Spanish Leather | | Sony Music Spain | |
| May 16 | Jin | Echo | Pop rock | Big Hit | |
| May 16 | Lido Pimienta | La Belleza | R&B | Anti- | |
| May 16 | Lucy Bedroque | Unmusique | Rage, digicore | DeadAir | |
| May 16 | M(h)aol | Something Soft | | Merge | |
| May 16 | Matt Maltese | Hers | Chamber pop | The Orchard | |
| May 16 | MØ | Plæygirl | Pop | Sony Music | |
| May 16 | Morgan Wallen | I'm the Problem | | Big Loud | |
| May 16 | Novelists | Coda | Progressive metalcore | ACKOR Music | |
| May 16 | Pelican | Flickering Resonance | Post-metal | Run for Cover | |
| May 16 | Peter Doherty | Felt Better Alive | | Strap Originals | |
| May 16 | Rico Nasty | Lethal | Rap rock | Fueled by Ramen | |
| May 16 | Robin Trower | Come and Find Me | | Provogue | |
| May 16 | Sleep Theory | Afterglow | Alternative metal, hard rock, nu metal | Epitaph | |
| May 16 | Sofi Tukker | Butter | | | |
| May 16 | Spill Tab | Angie | | Because Music | |
| May 16 | Tarja Turunen | Circus Life | | earMUSIC | |
| May 16 | Tee Grizzley | Forever My Moment | | 300 | |
| May 16 | Tune-Yards | Better Dreaming | | 4AD | |
| May 16 | Tyne-James Organ | The Other Side | | Dew Process | |
| May 16 | Xzibit | Kingmaker | West Coast hip-hop | Greenback Records | |
| May 18 | Mora | Lo Mismo de Siempre | | Rimas | |
| May 19 | Baekhyun | Essence of Reverie | R&B, K-pop | INB100 | |
| May 19 | I-dle | We Are | | Cube | |
| May 19 | Shamir | Ten | | Kill Rock Stars | |
| May 22 | El Cuarteto de Nos | Puertas | | | |
| May 23 | Anton Westerlin | Godaften | Dance, hip-hop, house | Universal Music Denmark | |
| May 23 | Boldy James and Your Boy Posca | Magnolia Leflore | | Near Mint | |
| May 23 | Don Felder | The Vault – Fifty Years of Music | | Frontiers | |
| May 23 | The Grogans | Stagger | | Cousin Will Record | |
| May 23 | Hinder | Back to Life | | Evil Teen Records | |
| May 23 | Home Is Where | Hunting Season | | Wax Bodega | |
| May 23 | Joe Jonas | Music for People Who Believe in Love | | Republic | |
| May 23 | Julia Wolf | Pressure | | Girls in Purgatory | |
| May 23 | Louise | Confessions | | | |
| May 23 | Marc Ribot | Map of a Blue City | | New West | |
| May 23 | Moonlight Haze | Beyond | Symphonic metal, power metal | Scarlet | |
| May 23 | Morcheeba | Escape the Chaos | | 100% Records | |
| May 23 | MSPaint | No Separation | Synth-punk | Convulse Records | |
| May 23 | Onslaught | Origins of Aggression | Thrash metal | Reigning Phoenix | |
| May 23 | Polish Club | Pound Cake | | Polish Club Music | |
| May 23 | Robert Forster | Strawberries | | Tapete | |
| May 23 | Sarah Connor | Freigeistin | Pop | Polydor | |
| May 23 | Skunk Anansie | The Painful Truth | | FLG Records | |
| May 23 | Smerz | Big City Life | Dream pop | Escho | |
| May 23 | Sparks | Mad! | Art rock, synth-pop | Transgressive | |
| May 23 | Sports Team | Boys These Days | | Bright Antenna, Distiller Records | |
| May 23 | Stereolab | Instant Holograms on Metal Film | | Duophonic UHF Disks, Warp | |
| May 23 | Taj Mahal and Keb' Mo' | Room on the Porch | Blues | Concord | |
| May 23 | These New Puritans | Crooked Wing | Post-rock | Domino | |
| May 26 | Red Velvet – Irene & Seulgi | Tilt | | SM | |
| May 26 | Seventeen | Happy Burstday | | Pledis | |
| May 27 | IU | A Flower Bookmark 3 | | EDAM | |
| May 28 | Gloria Estefan | Raíces | Latin pop | Crescent Moon Records, Sony Music Latin | |
| May 28 | Tash Sultana | Return to the Roots | | | |
| May 30 | Aesop Rock | Black Hole Superette | Hip-hop | Rhymesayers | |
| May 30 | Aitana | Cuarto Azul | Pop, synth-pop, electropop | Universal Music Spain | |
| May 30 | Alan Sparhawk & Trampled by Turtles | Alan Sparhawk with Trampled by Turtles | | Sub Pop | |
| May 30 | Anderson East | Worthy | | Rounder | |
| May 30 | Anyma | The End of Genesys | | Interscope | |
| May 30 | Ben Kweller | Cover the Mirrors | | The Noise Company | |
| May 30 | The Budos Band | VII | | Diamond West | |
| May 30 | Caroline | Caroline 2 | | Rough Trade | |
| May 30 | Civic | Chrome Dipped | | ATO | |
| May 30 | Cwfen | Sorrows | Post-punk | New Heavy Sounds | |
| May 30 | Desolated | Finding Peace | | MLVLTD | |
| May 30 | Dylan Scott | Easy Does It | | | |
| May 30 | Garbage | Let All That We Imagine Be the Light | | BMG | |
| May 30 | Goddess | Goddess | | Bella Union | |
| May 30 | GoldLink | Enoch | | | |
| May 30 | Grace Potter | Medicine | | Hollywood | |
| May 30 | Grateful Dead | Enjoying the Ride | Rock | Rhino | |
| May 30 | The Haunted | Songs of Last Resort | | Century Media | |
| May 30 | Heidi Montag | Heidiwood | Pop, dance | Pratt Productions | |
| May 30 | Illuminati Hotties | Nickel on the Fountain Floor | | Hopeless | |
| May 30 | Jacob Alon | In Limerence | | Island, EMI | |
| May 30 | Kathryn Joseph | We Were Made Prey | | Rock Action | |
| May 30 | Luh Tyler | Florida Boy | | | |
| May 30 | Matt Berninger | Get Sunk | | Book's Records, Concord | |
| May 30 | Miley Cyrus | Something Beautiful | Pop, progressive pop | Columbia | |
| May 30 | The Minus 5 | Oar On, Penelope! | College rock | Yep Roc | |
| May 30 | Obongjayar | Paradise Now | | September Recordings | |
| May 30 | Pearl Charles | Desert Queen | | | |
| May 30 | Planning for Burial | It's Closeness, It's Easy | | The Flenser | |
| May 30 | Rome Streetz and Conductor Williams | Trainspotting | | | |
| May 30 | Sally Shapiro | Ready to Live a Lie | | Italians Do It Better | |
| May 30 | Shura | I Got Too Sad for My Friends | Art pop | PIAS | |
| May 30 | Stray from the Path | Clockworked | | SharpTone | |
| May 30 | Swans | Birthing | | Mute, Young God | |
| May 30 | Trivax | The Great Satan | Black metal | Osmose | |
| May 30 | Ty Segall | Possession | | Drag City | |
| May 30 | Vildhjarta | Där skogen sjunger under evighetens granar | Progressive metal, djent | Century Media | |
| May 30 | Watchhouse | Rituals | | Tiptoe Tiger Music, Thirty Tigers | |
| May 30 | Will Epstein and Dave Harrington | Wine Picture | | Maximum Overdub | |
| May 30 | Wolves at the Gate | Wasteland | Christian metal, metalcore, post-hardcore | Solid State | |
| May 30 | Yeule | Evangelic Girl Is a Gun | | Ninja Tune | |

=== June ===
List of albums released in June 2025
Go to: January | February | March | April | May | June | July | August | September | October | November | December | Back to top
| Release date | Artist | Album | Genre | Label | Ref. |
| June 4 | Jon Bellion | Father Figure | | Beautiful Mind Records | |
| June 5 | Enhypen | Desire: Unleash | | Belift Lab | |
| June 6 | Addison Rae | Addison | Pop, dance-pop | Columbia, As Long As I'm Dancing | |
| June 6 | Azymuth | Marca Passo | | Far Out | |
| June 6 | Ben LaMar Gay | Yowzers | | International Anthem | |
| June 6 | Black Moth Super Rainbow | Soft New Magic Dream | | Rad Cult Records | |
| June 6 | Born Ruffians | Beauty's Pride | | Wavy Haze Records | |
| June 6 | Brian Eno and Beatie Wolfe | Lateral | | Verve | |
| June 6 | Brian Eno and Beatie Wolfe | Luminal | | Verve | |
| June 6 | Comet Gain | Letters to Ordinary Outsiders | Indie pop, jangle pop | Tapete | |
| June 6 | Cynthia Erivo | I Forgive You | R&B, gospel, folk | Verve, Republic | |
| June 6 | Death in Vegas | Death Mask | Techno | Drone Records | |
| June 6 | Destroy Lonely | See U Soon </3 | | | |
| June 6 | The Doobie Brothers | Walk This Road | Folk rock | Rhino | |
| June 6 | Eric Benét | The Co-Star | | JBR Creative Group | |
| June 6 | Finn Wolfhard | Happy Birthday | Indie rock, garage punk | AWAL | |
| June 6 | Frankie and the Witch Fingers | Trash Classic | | Greenway Records | |
| June 6 | Hayden Pedigo | I'll Be Waving as You Drive Away | American primitivism | Mexican Summer | |
| June 6 | Jane Paknia | Millions of Years of Longing | | Eat Your Own Ears Recordings | |
| June 6 | Jimmy Barnes | Defiant | | Mushroom | |
| June 6 | Joanne Shaw Taylor | Black & Gold | | Journeyman Records | |
| June 6 | Katatonia | Nightmares as Extensions of the Waking State | | Napalm | |
| June 6 | Lifeguard | Ripped and Torn | | Matador | |
| June 6 | Lil Wayne | Tha Carter VI | Hip-hop | Young Money, Republic | |
| June 6 | Little Simz | Lotus | Hip-hop | AWAL | |
| June 6 | Lucy Gooch | Desert Window | | Fire | |
| June 6 | Marianne Faithfull | Burning Moonlight | | Decca | |
| June 6 | Marina | Princess of Power | Dance-pop, eurodisco, synth-pop | Queenie Records, BMG | |
| June 6 | Mary Chapin Carpenter | Personal History | | Lambent Light Records | |
| June 6 | McKinley Dixon | Magic, Alive! | Jazz rap, conscious hip-hop | City Slang | |
| June 6 | Mother Mother | Nostalgia | | Parlophone, Warner | |
| June 6 | North Mississippi Allstars | Still Shakin' | | New West | |
| June 6 | Orthodox | A Door Left Open | | Century Media | |
| June 6 | Pulp | More | | Rough Trade | |
| June 6 | Rascal Flatts | Life Is a Highway: Refueled Duets | Country | Big Machine | |
| June 6 | Sabrina Claudio | Fall in Love with Her | | Empire | |
| June 6 | Seth MacFarlane | Lush Life: The Lost Sinatra Arrangements | | Verve, Republic | |
| June 6 | The Ting Tings | Home | | | |
| June 6 | Tracy Bonham | Sky Too Wide | | A Woody Hollow | |
| June 6 | Turnstile | Never Enough | Hardcore punk, alternative rock | Roadrunner | |
| June 6 | Various artists | Anthems: A Celebration of Broken Social Scene's You Forgot It in People | | Arts & Crafts | |
| June 6 | Volbeat | God of Angels Trust | | Republic | |
| June 6 | Wavves | Spun | | Ghost Ramp | |
| June 9 | Feid | Ferxxo Vol. X: Sagrado | | Universal Music Latino | |
| June 9 | Itzy | Girls Will Be Girls | | JYP, Republic | |
| June 11 | Calva Louise | Edge of the Abyss | | Mascot | |
| June 12 | Duo Ruut | Ilmateade | | | |
| June 12 | Emina Jahović | Svitanje | | | |
| June 12 | Pixel Grip | Percepticide: The Death of Reality | | | |
| June 13 | AJ Tracey | Don't Die Before You're Dead | | Revenge Records | |
| June 13 | Annahstasia | Tether | | Drink Sum Wtr | |
| June 13 | Ateez | Golden Hour: Part.3 | | KQ, RCA | |
| June 13 | Brandee Younger | Gadabout Season | | Impulse! | |
| June 13 | Byzantine | Harbingers | | | |
| June 13 | Buckcherry | Roar Like Thunder | Rock | Round Hill | |
| June 13 | The Bug Club | Very Human Features | | Sub Pop | |
| June 13 | Calum Hood | Order Chaos Order | | EMI | |
| June 13 | Cosey Fanni Tutti | 2t2 | | Conspiracy International | |
| June 13 | Crow Black Chicken | Ghost Dance | | | |
| June 13 | The Cure | Mixes of a Lost World | | Fiction, Capitol | |
| June 13 | Dee Dee Bridgewater and Bill Charlap | Elemental | Jazz | Mack Avenue | |
| June 13 | Dierks Bentley | Broken Branches | Country, bluegrass, alternative | Capitol Nashville | |
| June 13 | Draugveil | Cruel World of Dreams and Fears | Black metal | | |
| June 13 | EST Gee | My World | | CMG, Interscope | |
| June 13 | Fairyland | The Story Remains | Symphonic power metal | Frontiers | |
| June 13 | Fallujah | Xenotaph | Technical death metal | Nuclear Blast | |
| June 13 | Graham Hunt | Timeless World Forever | | Run for Cover | |
| June 13 | Half Man Half Biscuit | All Asimov and No Fresh Air | Post-punk | R. M. Qualtrough | |
| June 13 | Holden & Zimpel (James Holden & Waclaw Zimpel) | The Universe Will Take Care of You | | Border Community Recordings | |
| June 13 | James Marriott | Don't Tell the Dog | Alternative rock, indie pop, indie rock | AWAL | |
| June 13 | Juicy J and Logic | Live and in Color | | Trippy Music, Stem Distribution | |
| June 13 | King Gizzard & the Lizard Wizard | Phantom Island | | p(doom) | |
| June 13 | Leikeli47 | Lei Keli ft. 47 / For Promotional Use Only | | Thirty Tigers | |
| June 13 | Lil Tecca | Dopamine | | Galactic Records, Republic | |
| June 13 | Lyra Pramuk | Hymnal | | 7K!, Pop.soil | |
| June 13 | Marko Perković Thompson | Hodočasnik | | Croatia | |
| June 13 | Mary Halvorson | About Ghosts | Avant-garde jazz | Nonesuch | |
| June 13 | Mister Romantic | What's Not to Love? | | Eternal Magic Records | |
| June 13 | Neil Young and the Chrome Hearts | Talkin to the Trees | | Reprise, Other Shoe Records | |
| June 13 | Onefour | Look at Me Now | | Onefour | |
| June 13 | Patrick Wolf | Crying the Neck | Baroque pop, indie pop | Apport, Virgin Music | |
| June 13 | Slick Rick | Victory | Hip-hop | Mass Appeal, 7Wallace Records | |
| June 13 | The Swell Season | Forward | | Plateau Records, Masterkey Sounds Records | |
| June 13 | Van Morrison | Remembering Now | | Virgin | |
| June 13 | Witch | Sogolo | Zamrock | Partisan | |
| June 16 | Illit | Bomb | | Belift Lab | |
| June 17 | Bas and the Hics | Melanchronica | | The Fiends, Dreamville | |
| June 17 | Ghais Guevara | The Other 2/5ths or: The Absolutely True Diary of a Part-Time Trench Baby | | Ghais Guevara | |
| June 18 | Gang Parade | Gang Rise | | Fueled by Mentaiko | |
| June 18 | Goat Girl | Below the Waste – Orchestrated | | | |
| June 18 | Stray Kids | Hollow | | Epic Japan | |
| June 20 | Aitch | 4 | Hip-hop | NQ Records, The Orchard | |
| June 20 | Alestorm | The Thunderfist Chronicles | | Napalm | |
| June 20 | Badflower | No Place Like Home | | Big Machine | |
| June 20 | Benson Boone | American Heart | Pop rock | Warner | |
| June 20 | Brett Young | 2.0 | Country | Big Machine | |
| June 20 | Cryptopsy | An Insatiable Violence | | Season of Mist | |
| June 20 | Death Pill | Sologamy | | New Heavy Sounds | |
| June 20 | EsDeeKid | Rebel | | XV Records, Lizzy Records | |
| June 20 | Florence Road | Fall Back | Indie rock, alternative rock | Warner | |
| June 20 | GoGo Penguin | Necessary Fictions | | XXIM | |
| June 20 | Gregg Allman Band | One Night in DC: May 15, 1984 | Rock | Sawright | |
| June 20 | Haim | I Quit | Soft rock | Columbia, Polydor | |
| June 20 | Hotline TNT | Raspberry Moon | Shoegaze, alternative rock, power pop | Third Man | |
| June 20 | James McMurtry | The Black Dog and the Wandering Boy | | New West | |
| June 20 | Joshua Redman | Words Fall Short | Jazz | Blue Note | |
| June 20 | Karol G | Tropicoqueta | | Bichota Records, Interscope | |
| June 20 | Keke Palmer | Just Keke | | | |
| June 20 | Loyle Carner | Hopefully! | Hip-hop | Virgin EMI | |
| June 20 | Malevolence | Where Only the Truth Is Spoken | | MLVLTD Music, Nuclear Blast | |
| June 20 | Matmos | Metallic Life Review | | Thrill Jockey | |
| June 20 | Midwxst | Archangel | | | |
| June 20 | S.G. Goodman | Planting by the Signs | | Slough Water Records, Thirty Tigers | |
| June 20 | The Sick Man of Europe | The Sick Man of Europe | | The Leaf Label | |
| June 20 | Tropical Fuck Storm | Fairyland Codex | | Fire | |
| June 20 | U.S. Girls | Scratch It | Country | 4AD | |
| June 20 | University | McCartney, It'll Be Ok | | Transgressive | |
| June 20 | Various artists | KPop Demon Hunters (Soundtrack from the Netflix Film) | K-pop, electropop | Republic | |
| June 20 | Willie Nile | The Great Yellow Light | Pop | River House Records | |
| June 20 | Yaya Bey | Do It Afraid | R&B | Drink sum wtr | |
| June 20 | Yungblud | Idols | Rock | Locomotion Recordings, Capitol | |
| June 23 | Cravity | Dare to Crave | | Starship | |
| June 24 | Madison McFerrin | Scorpio | | | |
| June 25 | Charles Kelley | Songs for a New Moon | | | |
| June 25 | Daz Dillinger | Retaliation, Revenge and Get Back 2 | | Daz Dillinger | |
| June 27 | Adrian Quesada | Boleros Psicodélicos II | | ATO | |
| June 27 | Armin van Buuren | Breathe | | Armada | |
| June 27 | Barbra Streisand | The Secret of Life: Partners, Volume Two | Vocal pop | Columbia | |
| June 27 | BC Camplight | A Sober Conversation | Pop | Bella Union | |
| June 27 | Blonde Redhead and Brooklyn Youth Chorus | The Shadow of the Guest | | Section1 | |
| June 27 | Blood Vulture | Die Close | | Pure Noise | |
| June 27 | Bruce Springsteen | Tracks II: The Lost Albums | | Columbia | |
| June 27 | Charlotte Lawrence | Somewhere | | | |
| June 27 | Cole Swindell | Spanish Moss | Country | Warner Music Nashville | |
| June 27 | Deadguy | Near-Death Travel Services | | Relapse | |
| June 27 | Durand Jones & The Indications | Flowers | | Dead Oceans | |
| June 27 | Fishbone | Stockholm Syndrome | Ska, punk rock, funk | | |
| June 27 | Frankie Cosmos | Different Talking | Indie rock | Sub Pop | |
| June 27 | Frankie Grande | Hotel Rock Bottom | Dance-pop | Casablanca | |
| June 27 | Fred Hersch | The Surrounding Green | | ECM | |
| June 27 | Gelli Haha | Switcheroo | Alternative dance | Innovative Leisure | |
| June 27 | Greet Death | Die in Love | | Deathwish Inc. | |
| June 27 | Heaven Shall Burn | Heimat | | Century Media | |
| June 27 | Higher Power | There's Love in This World if You Want It | | Nuclear Blast | |
| June 27 | Isabella Lovestory | Vanity | | Giant Music | |
| June 27 | Jakko M. Jakszyk | Son of Glen | | Inside Out | |
| June 27 | Juan Wauters | Mvd Luv | Folk-pop | Captured Tracks | |
| June 27 | Katseye | Beautiful Chaos | Pop | Hybe, Geffen | |
| June 27 | Kevin Abstract | Blush | Hip-hop | Virgin, X8 Music, Juno | |
| June 27 | Laura Stevenson | Late Great | | Really Records | |
| June 27 | Lightheaded | Thinking, Dreaming, Scheming | Indie pop | Slumberland | |
| June 27 | Lizzo | My Face Hurts from Smiling | | Nice Life, Atlantic | |
| June 27 | Lorde | Virgin | Synth-pop, dance-pop | Republic, Universal Music New Zealand | |
| June 27 | Motörhead | The Manticore Tapes | Rock | Sanctuary | |
| June 27 | Moving Mountains | Pruning of the Lower Limbs | | Wax Bodega | |
| June 27 | Pan American | Interior of an Edifice Under the Sea | Ambient | Shimmy-Disc | |
| June 27 | Parker McCollum | Parker McCollum | Country | UMG Nashville | |
| June 27 | Pi'erre Bourne | Made in Paris | | SossHouse, Interscope | |
| June 27 | Public Enemy | Black Sky Over the Projects: Apartment 2025 | | Public Enemy | |
| June 27 | Robert Randolph | Preacher Kids | Blues | Sun | |
| June 27 | Royale Lynn | Black Magic | Alternative metal | Epitaph | |
| June 27 | Russ | Wild | | Diemon Records | |
| June 27 | Sara Storer | Worth Your Love | Country | Compass Brothers | |
| June 27 | Shadow of Intent | Imperium Delirium | Deathcore | Shadow of Intent | |
| June 27 | Sodom | The Arsonist | Thrash metal | Steamhammer | |
| June 27 | Various artists | F1 the Album | | Atlantic, Apple Video Programming | |
| June 27 | Willi Carlisle | Winged Victory | | Signature Sounds | |

== Third quarter ==
=== July ===
List of albums released in July 2025
Go to: January | February | March | April | May | June | July | August | September | October | November | December | Back to top
| Release date | Artist | Album | Genre | Label | Ref. |
| July 2 | Nilüfer Yanya | Dancing Shoes | | Ninja Tune | |
| July 4 | Big Special | National Average | Punk, funk | SO Recordings | |
| July 4 | Dropkick Murphys | For the People | | Dummy Luck Music, PIAS | |
| July 4 | JID | GDLU (Preluxe) | Southern hip-hop, trap | Dreamville, Interscope | |
| July 4 | Jonathan Richman | Only Frozen Sky Anyway | | Blue Arrow Records | |
| July 4 | Kae Tempest | Self Titled | Spoken word, conscious hip-hop | Island | |
| July 4 | Katie Gregson-MacLeod | Love Me Too Well, I'll Retire Early | | Last Recordings on Earth | |
| July 4 | Kesha | Period | Pop | Kesha Records | |
| July 4 | Merpire | Milk Pool | | Merpire | |
| July 4 | Nine Vicious | For Nothing | | | |
| July 4 | Paul Carrack | The Country Side of Paul Carrack Vol. 1 | Country | Carrack-UK | |
| July 4 | Rival Consoles | Landscape from Memory | | Erased Tapes | |
| July 4 | Shouse | Collective Ecstasy | | Hell Beach, OneLove | |
| July 4 | Warkings | Armageddon | Power metal | Napalm | |
| July 11 | 360 | Out of the Blue | | | |
| July 11 | Allo Darlin' | Bright Nights | | Slumberland, Fika | |
| July 11 | Amy Macdonald | Is This What You've Been Waiting For? | | Infectious Music, BMG | |
| July 11 | Ava Mendoza, Gabby Fluke-Mogul and Carolina Pérez | Mama Killa | | Burning Ambulance | |
| July 11 | Barry Can't Swim | Loner | Dance | Ninja Tune | |
| July 11 | Boldy James and Nicholas Craven | Late to My Own Funeral | | | |
| July 11 | Born of Osiris | Through Shadows | Progressive metalcore, djent | Sumerian | |
| July 11 | Brent Cobb & the Fixin's | Ain't Rocked in a While | | Ol' Buddy Records, Thirty Tigers | |
| July 11 | Burna Boy | No Sign of Weakness | | Spaceship, Bad Habit Records, Atlantic | |
| July 11 | Chris Lake | Chemistry | | Black Book Records | |
| July 11 | Clipse | Let God Sort Em Out | Hip-hop | Clipse, Roc Nation | |
| July 11 | Flooding | Object 1 | Slowcore | | |
| July 11 | Gina Birch | Trouble | | Third Man | |
| July 11 | Giveon | Beloved | R&B, soul | Epic, Not So Fast | |
| July 11 | Gwenno | Utopia | Psychedelic pop | Heavenly | |
| July 11 | Jessica Winter | My First Album | Alternative pop, synth-pop | Lucky Number Music | |
| July 11 | Justin Bieber | Swag | Synth-pop, R&B | Def Jam | |
| July 11 | Kokoroko | Tuff Times Never Last | | Brownswood | |
| July 11 | Larry June and Cardo Got Wings | Until Night Comes | | The Freeminded Records, Empire | |
| July 11 | Matt Jencik and Midwife | Never Die | | Relapse | |
| July 11 | MF Tomlinson | Die to Wake Up from a Dream | | PRAH | |
| July 11 | Noah Cyrus | I Want My Loved Ones to Go with Me | | Records Label, Columbia | |
| July 11 | Ólafur Arnalds and Talos | A Dawning | | Opia Community, Mercury KX | |
| July 11 | Open Mike Eagle | Neighborhood Gods Unlimited | | Auto Reverse Records | |
| July 11 | Poor Creature | All Smiles Tonight | Psychedelic folk | River Lea Recordings | |
| July 11 | Twice | This Is For | | JYP, Republic | |
| July 11 | Vylet Pony | Love & Ponystep | EDM | Horse Friends Music / 32.7 The Creek | |
| July 11 | Wet Leg | Moisturizer | | Domino | |
| July 13 | JackBoys and Travis Scott | JackBoys 2 | | Cactus Jack, Epic | |
| July 17 | Nancy Ajram | Nancy 11 | Arabic pop, dance-pop | In2Musica | |
| July 18 | Above & Beyond | Bigger Than All of Us | Trance | Anjunabeats | |
| July 18 | Alex G | Headlights | | RCA | |
| July 18 | Alex Warren | You'll Be Alright, Kid | | Atlantic | |
| July 18 | Billie Marten | Dog Eared | English folk, indie folk | Fiction | |
| July 18 | Bush | I Beat Loneliness | Alternative metal, hard rock | earMusic | |
| July 18 | Cam | All Things Light | | RCA | |
| July 18 | Che | Rest in Bass | Rage | 10K | |
| July 18 | Daron Malakian and Scars on Broadway | Addicted to the Violence | Alternative metal, nu metal | Scarred for Life Records | |
| July 18 | DJ Haram | Beside Myself | Electronic | Hyperdub | |
| July 18 | Fletcher | Would You Still Love Me If You Really Knew Me? | | Capitol | |
| July 18 | Gelo | League of My Own | | Def Jam | |
| July 18 | Jade Bird | Who Wants to Talk About Love? | | Glassnote | |
| July 18 | Jessie Murph | Sex Hysteria | R&B, pop-trap, pop rap | Columbia | |
| July 18 | Jim Legxacy | Black British Music (2025) | | XL | |
| July 18 | Joe Bonamassa | Breakthrough | Blues rock | J&R Adventures | |
| July 18 | Joyner Lucas | ADHD 2 | | Twenty Nine Music | |
| July 18 | Laura Jane Grace in the Trauma Tropes | Adventure Club | Punk rock | Polyvinyl | |
| July 18 | Lord Huron | The Cosmic Selector Vol. 1 | | Mercury | |
| July 18 | Madeline Kenney | Kiss from the Balcony | | Carpark | |
| July 18 | Natalie Bergman | My Home Is Not in This World | | Third Man | |
| July 18 | Panic Shack | Panic Shack | | Brace Yourself Records | |
| July 18 | Raekwon | The Emperor's New Clothes | Hip-hop | Mass Appeal | |
| July 18 | Silkmoney | Who Waters the Wilting Giving Tree Once the Leaves Dry Up and Fruits No Longer Bear? | | DB$B Records and Lex | |
| July 18 | Slaughter to Prevail | Grizzly | | Sumerian | |
| July 18 | Styx | Circling from Above | | UMe | |
| July 18 | Trisha Yearwood | The Mirror | | MCA Nashville | |
| July 18 | We Are Scientists | Qualifying Miles | Rock | Grönland | |
| July 18 | Zac Farro | Operator | | Congrats Records | |
| July 21 | Tomorrow X Together | The Star Chapter: Together | | Big Hit | |
| July 21 | Tyler, the Creator | Don't Tap the Glass | | Columbia | |
| July 25 | Alessi Rose | Voyeur | | Capitol, Polydor | |
| July 25 | Alice Cooper | The Revenge of Alice Cooper | Hard rock, shock rock | earMusic | |
| July 25 | The Band Camino | NeverAlways | | Atlantic | |
| July 25 | Black Magnet | Megamantra | | Federal Prisoner | |
| July 25 | Bruce Dickinson | More Balls to Picasso | | | |
| July 25 | Buddy Guy | Ain't Done with the Blues | | Silvertone, RCA | |
| July 25 | Cory Hanson | I Love People | Pop | Drag City | |
| July 25 | The Dirty Nil | The Lash | | Dine Alone | |
| July 25 | Enuff Z'Nuff | Xtra Cherries | | Cleopatra | |
| July 25 | Fever Ray | The Year of the Radical Romantics | | Mute | |
| July 25 | Fitz and the Tantrums | Man on the Moon | | Atlantic | |
| July 25 | Folk Bitch Trio | Now Would Be a Good Time | Indie folk, indie rock | Jagjaguwar | |
| July 25 | Freddie Gibbs and the Alchemist | Alfredo 2 | Hip-hop | ESGN Records, Virgin | |
| July 25 | The Haunt | New Addiction | | Nettwerk Music Group | |
| July 25 | Hudson Westbrook | Texas Forever | Country | Warner Music Nashville, River House Artists | |
| July 25 | Indigo De Souza | Precipice | Pop | Loma Vista | |
| July 25 | Kurt Vile | Classic Love | | Verve | |
| July 25 | Mabel | Mabel | | Polydor | |
| July 25 | Made Kuti | Chapter 1: Where Does Happiness Come From? | | LegacyPlus Records | |
| July 25 | Madonna | Veronica Electronica | | Warner | |
| July 25 | Mahotella Queens | Buya Buya: Come Back | Mbaqanga | Umsakazo Records | |
| July 25 | Michael Clifford | Sidequest | Electronic, pop-punk | Hopeless | |
| July 25 | Nick Drake | The Making of Five Leaves Left | Contemporary folk | Island | |
| July 25 | Patty Griffin | Crown of Roses | | PGM Recordings, Thirty Tigers | |
| July 25 | Paul Weller | Find El Dorado | | Parlophone | |
| July 25 | Post Animal | Iron | | Polyvinyl | |
| July 25 | Quadeca | Vanisher, Horizon Scraper | Art pop, folktronica, ambient | X8 Music | |
| July 25 | Ryan Davis & the Roadhouse Band | New Threats from the Soul | | Sophomore Lounge, Tough Love | |
| July 25 | Tim Minchin | Time Machine | | Navel Enterprises, BMG | |
| July 25 | Tyla | WWP | Amapiano | FAX, Epic, | |
| July 25 | Tyler Childers | Snipe Hunter | Country | Hickman Holler Records, RCA | |
| July 25 | Winston Surfshirt | Winston | | Sweat It Out | |
| July 25 | YoungBoy Never Broke Again | MASA | Hip-hop | Motown, Never Broke Again | |
| July 31 | Modola | New Light | | PG Records Entertainment, Base World | |

=== August ===
List of albums released in August 2025
Go to: January | February | March | April | May | June | July | August | September | October | November | December | Back to top
| Release date | Artist | Album | Genre | Label | Ref. |
| August 1 | AraabMuzik | Electronic Dream 2 | | Genre Defying Entertainment, D Productions | |
| August 1 | The Armed | The Future Is Here and Everything Needs to Be Destroyed | Post-hardcore | Sargent House | |
| August 1 | BabyTron | Luka Troncic 2 | | The Hip Hop Lab, Empire | |
| August 1 | Boosie Badazz | Words of a Real One | | Badazz Syndicate | |
| August 1 | Chris Janson | Wild Horses | | Harpeth 60 Records, Warner Nashville | |
| August 1 | Cian Ducrot | Little Dreaming | | Polydor | |
| August 1 | Desiigner | II | | LOD Entertainment | |
| August 1 | Fit for a King | Lonely God | Metalcore, alternative metal, djent | Solid State | |
| August 1 | Hilltop Hoods | Fall from the Light | Australian hip-hop | Island Australia, Universal Music Australia | |
| August 1 | Homixide Gang | Homixide Lifestyle 2 | | Opium, Interscope | |
| August 1 | Juicy J | Head on Swivel | | Trippy Music | |
| August 1 | Metro Boomin | A Futuristic Summa | | Boominati Worldwide, Republic | |
| August 1 | Morgan Wade | The Party Is Over (Recovered) | | | |
| August 1 | The New Eves | The New Eve Is Rising | | Transgressive | |
| August 1 | OT Tha Real and 38 Spesh | Possession with Intent | | T.C.F. Music Group | |
| August 1 | Reneé Rapp | Bite Me | Pop, R&B | Interscope | |
| August 1 | Sex Week | Upper Mezzanine | | Grand Jury | |
| August 1 | Slow Crush | Thirst | | Pure Noise | |
| August 1 | Suicideboys | Thy Kingdom Come | Southern hip-hop, horrorcore, trap | G*59 Records | |
| August 1 | Swanee | Believe | | Songland Records | |
| August 1 | The Vanns | All That's in My Head | | Upper River Records | |
| August 1 | Wisp | If Not Winter | Nu gaze | Music Soup, Interscope | |
| August 1 | Xaviersobased | Once More | Hip-hop | Surf Gang, Atlantic | |
| August 1 | Yeat | Dangerous Summer | Hip-hop, trap, pop rap | Capitol | |
| August 8 | Ada Lea | When I Paint My Masterpiece | Indie folk, indie rock | Saddle Creek | |
| August 8 | Amaarae | Black Star | Pop, dancehall | Interscope | |
| August 8 | Anamanaguchi | Anyway | Indie rock | Polyvinyl | |
| August 8 | Ashley Monroe | Tennessee Lightning | | | |
| August 8 | Attack Attack! | Attack Attack! II | Metalcore | Oxide Records | |
| August 8 | Babymetal | Metal Forth | Kawaii metal | Capitol | |
| August 8 | Bad Suns | Accelerator | | | |
| August 8 | Bailey Zimmerman | Different Night Same Rodeo | Country, country pop, country rock | Warner Nashville, Elektra | |
| August 8 | Big Freedia | Pressing Onward | | | |
| August 8 | The Black Keys | No Rain, No Flowers | Blues rock, garage rock | Easy Eye Sound, Warner | |
| August 8 | Blackbraid | Blackbraid III | | | |
| August 8 | Bryson Tiller | Solace & The Vices | | TrapSoul Records, RCA | |
| August 8 | Charley Crockett | Dollar a Day | Country | Island | |
| August 8 | Craig David | Commitment | | Believe | |
| August 8 | Dropout Kings | Yokai | | Napalm | |
| August 8 | Ethel Cain | Willoughby Tucker, I'll Always Love You | Americana | Daughters of Cain | |
| August 8 | Field Medic | Surrender Instead | | | |
| August 8 | For Those I Love | Carving the Stone | | September Recordings | |
| August 8 | Good Charlotte | Motel Du Cap | Pop-punk | Atlantic, MDDN | |
| August 8 | Google Earth (John Vanderslice and James Riotto) | Mac OS X 10.11 | | Tiny Telephone | |
| August 8 | Gunna | The Last Wun | | YSL, 300 | |
| August 8 | Guy Sebastian | 100 Times Around the Sun | | Sony Music Australia | |
| August 8 | Halestorm | Everest | Hard rock, heavy metal | Atlantic | |
| August 8 | Hayes Carll | We're Only Human | Country | 87 Records, Thirty Tigers | |
| August 8 | Humour | Learning Greek | | So Young Records | |
| August 8 | JID | God Does Like Ugly | Southern hip-hop, trap | Dreamville | |
| August 8 | Jonas Brothers | Greetings from Your Hometown | | Republic | |
| August 8 | Lydia Night | Parody of Pleasure | | Warner | |
| August 8 | Mechatok | Wide Awake | | Young | |
| August 8 | Meg Washington | Gem | | ORiGiN Recordings | |
| August 8 | MGK | Lost Americana | | Interscope | |
| August 8 | Mozzy | Intrusive Thoughts 2 | | Mozzy Records, Empire | |
| August 8 | Ninajirachi | I Love My Computer | EDM, trance, complextro | NLV Records | |
| August 8 | No Joy | Bugland | Shoegaze | Hand Drawn Dracula, Sonic Cathedral | |
| August 8 | Osees | Abomination Revealed at Last | | Death God | |
| August 8 | Phil Elverum and Arrington de Dionyso | Giant Opening Mouth on the Ground | | P.W. Elverum & Sun | |
| August 8 | Remble | Juco | | Warner | |
| August 8 | Roc Marciano and DJ Premier | The Coldest Profession | Hip-hop | To the Top | |
| August 8 | The Royston Club | Songs for the Spine | Indie rock, guitar pop | Modern Sky | |
| August 8 | Wombo | Danger in Fives | | Fire Talk Records | |
| August 8 | Young Nudy | Paradise | | RCA | |
| August 9 | As December Falls | Everything's on Fire but I'm Fine | | ADF Records, Virgin | |
| August 13 | AtHeart | Plot Twist | | Titan, Republic | |
| August 13 | Kevin Gates | Luca Brasi 4 | | Bread Winner's Alumni | |
| August 13 | Radiohead | Hail to the Thief (Live Recordings 2003–2009) | | XL | |
| August 15 | The Aces | Gold Star Baby | Disco-pop | The Aces Music | |
| August 15 | Alison Goldfrapp | Flux | Electropop | A.G. Records | |
| August 15 | Audrey Hobert | Who's the Clown? | Pop, alternative pop | RCA | |
| August 15 | Babyface Ray | Codeine Cowboy | | Wavy Gang, Empire | |
| August 15 | Big Noble | It's Later Than You Think | | | |
| August 15 | Black Honey | Soak | | | |
| August 15 | Bret McKenzie | Freak Out City | | Sub Pop | |
| August 15 | Cass McCombs | Interior Live Oak | | Domino | |
| August 15 | Cassandra Jenkins | My Light, My Massage Parlor | | Dead Oceans | |
| August 15 | Chance the Rapper | Star Line | Hip-hop | Chance the Rapper | |
| August 15 | Chevelle | Bright as Blasphemy | Alternative metal, hard rock, alternative rock | Alchemy Recordings | |
| August 15 | Chicago Underground Duo | Hyperglyph | Jazz | International Anthem | |
| August 15 | Conan Gray | Wishbone | Pop, pop rock | Republic | |
| August 15 | Dijon | Baby | R&B | Warner | |
| August 15 | Doc Pomus | You Can't Hip a Square: The Doc Pomus Songwriting Demos | | Omnivore | |
| August 15 | Gavin Adcock | Own Worst Enemy | Country | Thrivin' Here, Warner Nashville | |
| August 15 | Jerry Garcia Band | Live at the Warfield | | Garcia Family Provisions | |
| August 15 | Joey Valence & Brae | Hyperyouth | | RCA | |
| August 15 | Jordan Davis | Learn the Hard Way | | MCA Nashville | |
| August 15 | Kaytranada | Ain't No Damn Way! | House | RCA | |
| August 15 | Marissa Nadler | New Radiations | | Sacred Bones | |
| August 15 | Maroon 5 | Love Is Like | Pop, R&B, hip-hop | 222, Interscope | |
| August 15 | Molly Tuttle | So Long Little Miss Sunshine | Pop, bluegrass | Nonesuch | |
| August 15 | Panopticon | Laurentian Blue | | Birdrune Recordings | |
| August 15 | Panopticon | Songs of Hiraeth | | Birdrune Recordings | |
| August 15 | Pile | Sunshine and Balance Beams | Rock | Sooper | |
| August 15 | Pool Kids | Easier Said Than Done | Pop | Epitaph | |
| August 15 | Racing Mount Pleasant | Racing Mount Pleasant | Folk rock, post-rock, baroque pop | R&R | |
| August 15 | Rich Brian | Where Is My Head? | Hip-hop | 88rising | |
| August 15 | Rise Against | Ricochet | | Loma Vista | |
| August 15 | She's Green | Chrysalis | | Photo Finish | |
| August 15 | Stephen Bishop | Thimk | | | |
| August 15 | Steve Gunn | Music for Writers | | Three Lobed Records | |
| August 15 | That Mexican OT | Recess | | Manifest, GoodTalk, Capitol | |
| August 15 | Tom Grennan | Everywhere I Went, Led Me to Where I Didn't Want to Be | | Insanity Records | |
| August 15 | Unleashed | Fire Upon Your Lands | | Napalm | |
| August 15 | Warmen | Band of Brothers | Melodic death metal | Reaper Entertainment | |
| August 21 | Mushvenom | Earl | K-pop, pop rap | Kakao | |
| August 22 | 2 Chainz | Red Clay (Official Motion Picture Soundtrack) | | Gamebread, Empire | |
| August 22 | Adrian Sherwood | The Collapse of Everything | | On-U Sound | |
| August 22 | Ava Max | Don't Click Play | | Atlantic | |
| August 22 | BigXthaPlug | I Hope You're Happy | | UnitedMasters | |
| August 22 | Carla Patullo | Nomadica | | The Soundry | |
| August 22 | Case Oats | Last Missouri Exit | | Merge | |
| August 22 | Ciara | CiCi | | Beauty Marks Entertainment | |
| August 22 | Deftones | Private Music | | Reprise, Warner | |
| August 22 | Dinosaur Pile-Up | I've Felt Better | | Mascot | |
| August 22 | Dominic Fike | Rocket | | Columbia | |
| August 22 | Earl Sweatshirt | Live Laugh Love | Hip-hop | Tan Cressida Records, Warner | |
| August 22 | Emma Louise and Flume | Dumb | | Flume | |
| August 22 | Eric Alexander and Vincent Herring | Split Decision | Jazz | Smoke Sessions | |
| August 22 | Ghostface Killah | Supreme Clientele 2 | | Mass Appeal | |
| August 22 | Greg Freeman | Burnover | | Canvasback Music | |
| August 22 | Hand Habits | Blue Reminder | Indie folk | Fat Possum | |
| August 22 | Hot Mulligan | The Sound a Body Makes When It's Still | Emo | Wax Bodega | |
| August 22 | Hunx and His Punx | Walk Out on This World | | Get Better | |
| August 22 | James Yorkston | Songs for Nina and Johanna | | Domino | |
| August 22 | Jim Bob | Automatic | | Cherry Red | |
| August 22 | Jim Bob | Stick | | Cherry Red | |
| August 22 | John Fogerty | Legacy: The Creedence Clearwater Revival Years | | Concord | |
| August 22 | Jon Batiste | Big Money | | Verve, Interscope | |
| August 22 | Kaitlyn Aurelia Smith | Gush | | Nettwerk | |
| August 22 | Kalan.FrFr | California Player | | Roc Nation | |
| August 22 | Karan Aujla | P-Pop Culture | | Warner Music Canada, Warner Music India | |
| August 22 | Kathleen Edwards | Billionaire | Americana | Dualtone | |
| August 22 | Kid Cudi | Free | | Wicked Awesome, Republic | |
| August 22 | Kingfishr | Halcyon | Indie folk | B-Unique, Atlantic | |
| August 22 | Laufey | A Matter of Time | | AWAL | |
| August 22 | Lila Iké | Treasure Self Love | | Wurl Ike Records, In.DiggNation Collective Records | |
| August 22 | Linda May Han Oh | Strange Heavens | | Biophilia | |
| August 22 | Mac DeMarco | Guitar | | Mac's Record Label | |
| August 22 | Mariah the Scientist | Hearts Sold Separately | | Buckles Laboratories, Epic | |
| August 22 | Nourished by Time | The Passionate Ones | Pop, R&B | XL | |
| August 22 | Offset | Kiari | Pop rap | Motown | |
| August 22 | Old Dominion | Barbara | Country | Columbia Nashville, Sony Nashville | |
| August 22 | Pendulum | Inertia | Drum and bass, electronic rock, alternative metal | Mushroom | |
| August 22 | Quannnic | Warbrained | | DeadAir | |
| August 22 | Royel Otis | Hickey | | Ourness Record, Capitol | |
| August 22 | Rudimental | Rudim3ntal | | Rudimental | |
| August 22 | Signs of the Swarm | To Rid Myself of Truth | Deathcore | Century Media | |
| August 22 | Sir Chloe | Swallow the Knife | | OneRPM | |
| August 22 | Sombr | I Barely Know Her | Pop, indie rock | Warner | |
| August 22 | Soulja Boy | Draco Season | | | |
| August 22 | Stray Kids | Karma | | JYP, Republic | |
| August 22 | Superchunk | Songs in the Key of Yikes | | Merge | |
| August 22 | Teenage Dads | My Memento | | Chugg | |
| August 22 | Teyana Taylor | Escape Room | | Taylormade Enterprises, Def Jam | |
| August 22 | Three Days Grace | Alienation | | RCA | |
| August 22 | Tops | Bury the Key | | Ghostly | |
| August 22 | Touch Sensitive | In Paradise | | Future Classic | |
| August 22 | Walker Hayes | 17 Problems | | RCA | |
| August 22 | The Warning | Live from Auditorio Nacional, CDMX | | Lava, Republic | |
| August 22 | Water from Your Eyes | It's a Beautiful Place | Alternative pop, alternative rock | Matador | |
| August 22 | We Came as Romans | All Is Beautiful... Because We're Doomed | Metalcore | SharpTone | |
| August 22 | The Who | Live at the Oval 1971 | Rock | UMe | |
| August 22 | Winter | Adult Romantix | | Winspear Records | |
| August 22 | Woe, Is Me | Daybreak | | SBG Records | |
| August 22 | Wolf Alice | The Clearing | Soft rock | RCA | |
| August 22 | The World Is a Beautiful Place & I Am No Longer Afraid to Die | Dreams of Being Dust | Metalcore, progressive emo | Epitaph | |
| August 25 | Ive | Ive Secret | | Starship | |
| August 26 | The Casket Lottery | Feel the Teeth | | Iodine | |
| August 26 | Runnner | A Welcome Kind of Weakness | | Run for Cover | |
| August 27 | Twice | Enemy | J-pop | Warner Music Japan | |
| August 28 | Gaby Amarantos | Rock Doido | | | |
| August 28 | Hayley Williams | Ego Death at a Bachelorette Party | | Post Atlantic Records | |
| August 28 | Westside Gunn | Heels Have Eyes 2 | | Griselda, Roc Nation | |
| August 29 | Anna Tivel | Animal Poem | | Fluff & Gravy Records | |
| August 29 | The Beaches | No Hard Feelings | | AWAL | |
| August 29 | Belinda Carlisle | Once Upon a Time in California | New wave, pop rock, soft rock | Edsel Records | |
| August 29 | The Berries | The Berries | | | |
| August 29 | The Beths | Straight Line Was a Lie | Indie rock | Anti- | |
| August 29 | Blood Orange | Essex Honey | | RCA | |
| August 29 | Brad Mehldau | Ride into the Sun | Chamber pop, indie folk, jazz | Nonesuch | |
| August 29 | Bryan Adams | Roll with the Punches | Rock | Bad Records | |
| August 29 | Christian McBride Big Band | Without Further Ado, Vol 1 | Neo-bop, post-bop, straight-ahead jazz | Mack Avenue | |
| August 29 | CMAT | Euro-Country | Indie pop, country | AWAL | |
| August 29 | Drapht | A Beautiful Day to Be Lonely | | | |
| August 29 | Eiko Ishibashi and Jim O'Rourke | Pareidolia | Electronic | Drag City | |
| August 29 | Flyte | Between You and Me | | Nettwerk | |
| August 29 | Fun Lovin' Criminals | A Matter of Time | | | |
| August 29 | Helloween | Giants & Monsters | Power metal | Reigning Phoenix | |
| August 29 | The Hives | The Hives Forever Forever the Hives | | PIAS | |
| August 29 | Jehnny Beth | You Heartbreaker, You | Dance-punk, art pop, industrial | Fiction | |
| August 29 | John Oates | Oates | | | |
| August 29 | Joey Badass | Lonely at the Top | | Columbia | |
| August 29 | Joseph Shabason, Nicholas Krgovich, and Tenniscoats | Wao | | Western Vinyl | |
| August 29 | Lowheaven | Ritual Decay | | MNRK | |
| August 29 | Margo Price | Hard Headed Woman | Neotraditional country | Loma Vista | |
| August 29 | Modern Nature | The Heat Warps | | Bella Union | |
| August 29 | Nghtmre | Mindfull | | Gud Vibrations, BMG | |
| August 29 | Nova Twins | Parasites & Butterflies | Alternative rock, punk rock, rap rock | Marshall | |
| August 29 | Pinkshift | Earthkeeper | | Hopeless | |
| August 29 | Prolapse | I Wonder When They're Going to Destroy Your Face | | Tapete | |
| August 29 | Rob Simonsen | Caught Stealing (The Original Motion Picture Soundtrack) | | | |
| August 29 | Rodney Crowell | Airline Highway | | New West | |
| August 29 | Ron Sexsmith | Hangover Terrace | | Cooking Vinyl, Pheromone Recordings | |
| August 29 | Sabrina Carpenter | Man's Best Friend | Pop, soft rock | Island | |
| August 29 | Skepta and Fred Again | Skepta .. Fred | | | |
| August 29 | Stephen Wilson Jr. | Blankets | | Big Loud | |
| August 29 | Tift Merritt | Time and Patience | | One Riot Records | |
| August 29 | Tiwa Savage | This One Is Personal | R&B, Afrobeats | Empire | |
| August 29 | Vicious Rumors | The Devil's Asylum | | SPV/Steamhammer | |
| August 29 | X Ambassadors | VHS(X) | | Virgin | |
| August 29 | Zach Top | Ain't in It for My Health | Neotraditional country | Leo33 | |

=== September ===
List of albums released in September 2025
Go to: January | February | March | April | May | June | July | August | September | October | November | December | Back to top
| Release date | Artist | Album | Genre | Label | Ref. |
| September 1 | Monsta X | The X | K-pop | Starship, Kakao | |
| September 1 | Treasure | Love Pulse | | YG, Columbia | |
| September 1 | Zerobaseone | Never Say Never | | Wake One | |
| September 3 | Asca | 28 | | | |
| September 3 | Non | Renarrate | | | |
| September 5 | Anne Murray | Here You Are | | Universal Music | |
| September 5 | Big Thief | Double Infinity | Indie rock, folk rock | 4AD | |
| September 5 | Blessthefall | Gallows | Metalcore | Rise | |
| September 5 | Cody | Pilot | | Fake Reality | |
| September 5 | Curtis Harding | Departures & Arrivals: Adventures of Captain Curt | | | |
| September 5 | Cut Copy | Moments | Alternative dance | Cutters Records | |
| September 5 | Dark Angel | Extinction Level Event | | Reversed Records | |
| September 5 | David Byrne | Who Is the Sky? | Art pop | Matador | |
| September 5 | La Dispute | No One Was Driving the Car | | Epitaph | |
| September 5 | El Michels Affair | 24 Hr Sports | | Big Crown Records | |
| September 5 | Faithless | Champion Sound | | | |
| September 5 | Fleshwater | 2000: In Search of the Endless Sky | | Closed Casket Activities | |
| September 5 | FM | Brotherhood | | Frontiers | |
| September 5 | Fujii Kaze | Prema | | Hehn, Universal Sigma, Republic | |
| September 5 | G Flip | Dream Ride | | AWAL | |
| September 5 | Glenn Hughes | Chosen | | Frontiers Music | |
| September 5 | Grandson | Inertia | | XX Records, Create | |
| September 5 | Grant-Lee Phillips | In the Hour of Dust | | Yep Roc | |
| September 5 | Harold López-Nussa | Nueva Timba | | Blue Note | |
| September 5 | Ivy | Traces of You | | Bar/None | |
| September 5 | James Barker Band | One of Us | Country | Universal Canada | |
| September 5 | Justin Bieber | Swag II | Synth-pop, R&B, indie rock | Def Jam | |
| September 5 | Lucrecia Dalt | A Danger to Ourselves | | RVNG Intl. | |
| September 5 | Max Richter, Louisa Fuller and Max Ruisi | Sleep Circle | | Deutsche Grammophon | |
| September 5 | Modern Life Is War | Life on the Moon | | Deathwish Inc., Iodine | |
| September 5 | Rob Thomas | All Night Days | | UMG | |
| September 5 | Saint Etienne | International | | Heavenly | |
| September 5 | SG Lewis | Anemoia | | Forever Days Records | |
| September 5 | Shame | Cutthroat | Post-punk | Dead Oceans | |
| September 5 | Suede | Antidepressants | Post-punk, gothic rock | BMG | |
| September 5 | Tallah | Primeval: Obsession // Detachment | Nu metal, alternative metal, metalcore | Earache | |
| September 5 | Tom Odell | A Wonderful Life | | UROK | |
| September 8 | Haechan | Taste | R&B, soul | SM, Kakao | |
| September 9 | Ho99o9 | Tomorrow We Escape | | Deathkult, Last Gang | |
| September 12 | 4Batz | Still Shinin | R&B | BuVision | |
| September 12 | Algernon Cadwallader | Trying Not to Have a Thought | | Saddle Creek | |
| September 12 | Baxter Dury | Allbarone | Electronic, pop | Heavenly | |
| September 12 | Between the Buried and Me | The Blue Nowhere | | Inside Out | |
| September 12 | Chaeyoung | Lil Fantasy Vol. 1 | K-pop | JYP, Republic | |
| September 12 | The Chameleons | Arctic Moon | | | |
| September 12 | Dance Gavin Dance | Pantheon | Post-hardcore, progressive rock, funk rock | Rise | |
| September 12 | Demon Hunter | There Was a Light Here | | Weapons MFG | |
| September 12 | Die Spitz | Something to Consume | Doom metal | Third Man | |
| September 12 | Ed Sheeran | Play | | Gingerbread Man, Atlantic | |
| September 12 | Emma Swift | The Resurrection Game | | Tiny Ghost Records | |
| September 12 | Frost Children | Sister | | True Panther, Dirty Hit | |
| September 12 | Fruit Bats | Baby Man | | Merge | |
| September 12 | Gruff Rhys | Dim Probs | | Rock Action | |
| September 12 | Guerilla Toss | You're Weird Now | | Sub Pop | |
| September 12 | Helstar | The Devil's Masquerade | | Massacre | |
| September 12 | The Hidden Cameras | Bronto | | Mixed Up Records | |
| September 12 | I See Stars | The Wheel | | Sumerian | |
| September 12 | Jade | That's Showbiz Baby! | Pop | RCA | |
| September 12 | Jens Lekman | Songs for Other People's Weddings | | Secretly Canadian | |
| September 12 | John Carter Cash | Pineapple John | | | |
| September 12 | Josh Ritter | I Believe in You, My Honeydew | | Thirty Tigers | |
| September 12 | Kassa Overall | Cream | | Warp | |
| September 12 | King Princess | Girl Violence | | Columbia, Section1 | |
| September 12 | Liquid Mike | Hell Is an Airport | Powerpop | AWAL | |
| September 12 | Lorna Shore | I Feel the Everblack Festering Within Me | Deathcore, symphonic deathcore, extreme metal | Century Media | |
| September 12 | Maruja | Pain to Power | | Music for Nations | |
| September 12 | Michael Hurley | Broken Homes and Gardens | | No Quarter Records | |
| September 12 | Mimi Webb | Confessions | | Epic, RCA | |
| September 12 | Nevertel | Start Again | | Epitaph | |
| September 12 | Not Enough Space | Weaponize Your Rage | | Thriller | |
| September 12 | Parcels | Loved | Electropop, funk, R&B | Because Music | |
| September 12 | Phil Wickham | Song of the Saints | | Fair Trade Services, Columbia | |
| September 12 | The Rasmus | Weirdo | | Better Noise | |
| September 12 | Rezz | As the Pendulum Swings | Electronic | | |
| September 12 | Ruston Kelly | Pale, Through the Window | | | |
| September 12 | Silverstein | Pink Moon | | UNFD | |
| September 12 | Sister Nancy | Armageddon | | | |
| September 12 | Sophie Ellis-Bextor | Perimenopop | Disco, pop | Decca, Casablanca | |
| September 12 | Spinal Tap | The End Continues | | Interscope | |
| September 12 | Starset | Silos | | Fearless | |
| September 12 | Tav Falco | Desire on Ice | Rock and roll, psychedelic rock | Frenzi Records, Org Music | |
| September 12 | Teenage Bottlerocket | Ready to Roll | | Pirates Press | |
| September 12 | Twenty One Pilots | Breach | | Fueled by Ramen | |
| September 12 | Der Weg einer Freiheit | Innern | | Season of Mist | |
| September 17 | Orbit | Roar | | Present Label | |
| September 18 | Yasmine Hamdan | I Remember I Forget | | | |
| September 19 | 38 Special | Milestone | | 38 Special | |
| September 19 | Atmosphere | Jestures | | Rhymesayers | |
| September 19 | Benny Sings | Beat Tape III | | Stones Throw | |
| September 19 | Black Lips | Season of the Peach | | Fire | |
| September 19 | Cardi B | Am I the Drama? | Hip-hop | Atlantic | |
| September 19 | Cardiacs | LSD | Progressive rock | Alphabet Business Concern | |
| September 19 | Cécile McLorin Salvant | Oh Snap | Jazz | Nonesuch | |
| September 19 | Chase Rice | Eldora | | | |
| September 19 | Currensy | 9/15 | | Jet Life Recordings | |
| September 19 | Ded | Resent | | UNFD | |
| September 19 | Destroy Lonely | Broken Hearts 3 | | Opium, Interscope | |
| September 19 | The Divine Comedy | Rainy Sunday Afternoon | Chamber pop | Divine Comedy Records | |
| September 19 | Evan Greer | AMAB/ACAB | | Get Better | |
| September 19 | The Favors (Finneas and Ashe) | The Dream | | Darkroom | |
| September 19 | The Happy Fits | Lovesick | Indie rock | | |
| September 19 | Hunxho | For Her 2 | | 300 | |
| September 19 | I Prevail | Violent Nature | Metalcore | Fearless | |
| September 19 | Igorrr | Amen | | Metal Blade | |
| September 19 | Jay Electronica | A Written Testimony: Leaflets | | Roc Nation | |
| September 19 | Jay Electronica | A Written Testimony: Power at the Rate of My Dreams | | Roc Nation | |
| September 19 | Joan Shelley | Real Warmth | | No Quarter Records | |
| September 19 | Joanne Robertson | Blurrr | Experimental | AD 93 | |
| September 19 | Johnny Marr | Look Out Live! | | BMG | |
| September 19 | Josh Ross | Later Tonight | Country | Core, Universal Canada, Mercury Nashville | |
| September 19 | Kieran Hebden and William Tyler | 41 Longfield Street Late '80s | | Eat Your Own Ears Recordings | |
| September 19 | Kittie | Spit XXV | | Sumerian | |
| September 19 | Kojey Radical | Don't Look Down | Hip-hop | Asylum, Atlantic | |
| September 19 | Lazer Dim 700 | Gangway | | Lazer Dim 700 | |
| September 19 | Lefty Gunplay | Ghetto Heisman | | OTR Records | |
| September 19 | Leith Ross | I Can See the Future | | Republic | |
| September 19 | Leon Vynehall | In Daytona Yellow | | Ooze Inc. | |
| September 19 | Lola Young | I'm Only F**king Myself | | Island | |
| September 19 | Motion City Soundtrack | The Same Old Wasted Wonderful World | | Epitaph | |
| September 19 | Múm | History of Silence | Chamber pop | Morr Music | |
| September 19 | Nation of Language | Dance Called Memory | Pop | Sub Pop | |
| September 19 | NewDad | Altar | | Fair Youth, Atlantic | |
| September 19 | Nine Inch Nails | Tron: Ares (Original Motion Picture Soundtrack) | Industrial rock | Interscope, Walt Disney, The Null Corporation | |
| September 19 | Novembers Doom | Major Arcana | Death-doom, progressive death metal, gothic metal | Prophecy Productions | |
| September 19 | Ocean Alley | Love Balloon | Indie rock, surf rock | Community Music | |
| September 19 | Paradise Lost | Ascension | | Nuclear Blast | |
| September 19 | Sammy Virji | Same Day Cleaning | | Capitol | |
| September 19 | Sarah McLachlan | Better Broken | | Concord | |
| September 19 | Wednesday | Bleeds | | Dead Oceans | |
| September 19 | Wicca Phase Springs Eternal | Mossy Oak Shadow | | Run for Cover | |
| September 19 | Wilder Maker | The Streets Like Beds Still Warm | | Western Vinyl | |
| September 19 | Zaz | Sains et saufs | | Tôt ou Tard | |
| September 21 | Jay Electronica | A Written Testimony: Mars, the Inhabited Planet | | Roc Nation | |
| September 25 | BGYO | Headlines | Pop, R&B, dance-pop | ABS-CBN Music | |
| September 25 | Milo J | La Vida Era Más Corta | | Sony Music | |
| September 26 | Amanda Shires | Nobody's Girl | Americana | ATO | |
| September 26 | Amorphis | Borderland | | Reigning Phoenix Music | |
| September 26 | Automatic | Is It Now? | | Stones Throw | |
| September 26 | Biffy Clyro | Futique | | 14th Floor, Warner | |
| September 26 | Bitchin Bajas | Inland See | | Drag City | |
| September 26 | Cameron Whitcomb | The Hard Way | | Atlantic | |
| September 26 | Cate Le Bon | Michelangelo Dying | | Mexican Summer | |
| September 26 | Christone "Kingfish" Ingram | Hard Road | Blues | Red Zero | |
| September 26 | Coach Party | Caramel | | Chess Club Records | |
| September 26 | Colbie Caillat | This Time Around | | Blue Jean Baby Records | |
| September 26 | Delilah Bon | Princeless Princess | | Trash Queen Records | |
| September 26 | Doja Cat | Vie | | RCA | |
| September 26 | Dying Wish | Flesh Stays Together | Metalcore | SharpTone | |
| September 26 | Fred Armisen | 100 Sound Effects | | Drag City | |
| September 26 | Geese | Getting Killed | Art rock, indie rock, experimental rock | Partisan | |
| September 26 | Glaive | Y'all | | Broke, Slowsilver03 | |
| September 26 | Hardy | Country! Country! | | Big Loud | |
| September 26 | Hunny | Spirit! | | | |
| September 26 | Jeff Tweedy | Twilight Override | | dBpm | |
| September 26 | Joy Crookes | Juniper | Jazz, R&B, pop | Speakerbox Records, Insanity | |
| September 26 | Kaylee Bell | Cowboy Up | | Kaylee Bell | |
| September 26 | Lady A | On This Winter's Night Vol. 2 | | | |
| September 26 | Lady Wray | Cover Girl | | Big Crown | |
| September 26 | The Living End | I Only Trust Rock n Roll | | BMG | |
| September 26 | The Marcus King Band | Darling Blue | | American, Republic | |
| September 26 | Mariah Carey | Here for It All | R&B | Gamma | |
| September 26 | Mulatu Astatke | Mulatu Plays Mulatu | | Strut | |
| September 26 | Neko Case | Neon Grey Midnight Green | | Anti- | |
| September 26 | Olivia Dean | The Art of Loving | Pop, neo-soul | Capitol | |
| September 26 | Perrie | Perrie | Pop | Columbia | |
| September 26 | President | King of Terrors | | | |
| September 26 | Purity Ring | Purity Ring | | The Fellowship | |
| September 26 | Rachel Platten | Fight Song (Rachel's Version) | | | |
| September 26 | Rage | A New World Rising | | SPV/Steamhammer | |
| September 26 | Rainbow Kitten Surprise | Bones | | Atlantic | |
| September 26 | Revocation | New Gods, New Masters | Technical death metal, thrash metal | Metal Blade | |
| September 26 | Robert Plant with Suzi Dian | Saving Grace | | Nonesuch | |
| September 26 | Rochelle Jordan | Through the Wall | House, alternative R&B, dance-pop | Empire | |
| September 26 | Sam Prekop | Open Close | | Thrill Jockey | |
| September 26 | Sarz | Protect Sarz at All Costs | Afro fusion | 1789 | |
| September 26 | Shiner | Believeyoume | | Spartan | |
| September 26 | Sloan | Based on the Best Seller | Power pop | Murderecords, Yep Roc | |
| September 26 | Sprints | All That Is Over | | City Slang, Sub Pop | |
| September 26 | Tom Skinner | Kaleidoscopic Visions | | Brownswood, International Anthem | |
| September 26 | Vlure | Escalate | | Music for Nations | |
| September 26 | White Reaper | Only Slightly Empty | | Blue Grape Music | |
| September 26 | Young Thug | UY Scuti | | YSL, 300, Atlantic | |
| September 26 | Zara Larsson | Midnight Sun | Electropop, dance-pop | Sommer House, Epic | |
| September 29 | Molly Nilsson | Amateur | Synth-pop, electropop, synthwave | Dark Skies Association, Night School Records | |

== Fourth quarter ==
=== October ===
List of albums released in October 2025
Go to: January | February | March | April | May | June | July | August | September | October | November | December | Back to top
| Release date | Artist | Album | Genre | Label | Ref. |
| October 1 | Kelly Moran | Don't Trust Mirrors | Experimental | Warp | |
| October 1 | Peel Dream Magazine | Taurus | | Topshelf | |
| October 2 | Bryson Tiller | Solace & The Vices | Hip-hop, trap, drill | TrapSoul Records, RCA | |
| October 2 | Haifa Wehbe | Mega Haifa | | | |
| October 3 | Adekunle Gold | Fuji | Afrobeats | Somtin Different, Believe Recordings | |
| October 3 | AFI | Silver Bleeds the Black Sun... | Post-punk, gothic rock | Run for Cover | |
| October 3 | Agriculture | The Spiritual Sound | Black metal | The Flenser | |
| October 3 | Arthur Buck (Peter Buck and Joseph Arthur) | Arthur Buck 2 | | Lonely Astronaut | |
| October 3 | Ash | Ad Astra | | Fierce Panda | |
| October 3 | Author & Punisher | Nocturnal Birding | | Relapse | |
| October 3 | Bendik Giske | Remixed | | Smalltown Supersound | |
| October 3 | Bliss n Eso | The Moon (The Dark Side) | | Flight Deck, Mushroom | |
| October 3 | Boy Soda | Soulstar | | Warner Music Australia | |
| October 3 | Cory Marks | Sorry for Nothing Vol. 2 | | Better Noise | |
| October 3 | Dodie | Not for Lack of Trying | Bedroom pop, folk-pop | Decca | |
| October 3 | Good Neighbours | Blue Sky Mentality | | Polydor | |
| October 3 | Idlewild | Idlewild | | V2 | |
| October 3 | James Morrison | Fight Another Day | Pop | Cooking Vinyl | |
| October 3 | Jamie Woon | 3, 10, Why, When | | | |
| October 3 | Jennifer Lopez, Diego Luna and Tonatiuh | Kiss of the Spider Woman (Original Motion Picture Soundtrack) | | Lakeshore, Center Stage | |
| October 3 | Kara Grainger | That's How I Got to Memphis | Blues, soul | Red Parlor, Station House Records | |
| October 3 | Kettama | Archangel | | Steel City Dance Discs | |
| October 3 | Kino | Molnii Indry | | | |
| October 3 | Lovejoy | One Simple Trick | | | |
| October 3 | Michael Schenker Group | Don't Sell Your Soul | | earMusic | |
| October 3 | The Midnight | Syndicate | Synthwave | Ultra | |
| October 3 | Orbit Culture | Death Above Life | Death metal | Century Media | |
| October 3 | Pete Murray | Longing | | Community Music | |
| October 3 | Rachael Yamagata | Starlit Alchemy | | | |
| October 3 | The Rions | Everything Every Single Day | Pop rock | Community Music | |
| October 3 | Rocket | R Is for Rocket | | Transgressive | |
| October 3 | Say She She | Cut & Rewind | | Colemine Records | |
| October 3 | Snõõper | Worldwide | | Third Man | |
| October 3 | Sparks | Madder! | | Transgressive | |
| October 3 | Stay Inside | Lunger | | Tiny Engines Records | |
| October 3 | Taylor Swift | The Life of a Showgirl | Pop, soft rock | Republic | |
| October 3 | Thrice | Horizons/West | Rock and roll | Epitaph | |
| October 3 | Today Is the Day | Never Give In | | Supernova Records | |
| October 3 | Upchuck | I'm Nice Now | Punk | Domino | |
| October 3 | Waylon Jennings | Songbird | Country, outlaw country | Son of Jessi Records, Thirty Tigers | |
| October 3 | Wet Wet Wet | Strings Attached | | | |
| October 3 | The Wiggles | The Tree of Wisdom | | | |
| October 9 | Radwimps | Anew | Alternative rock | EMI | |
| October 10 | Amber Mark | Pretty Idea | | PMR, Interscope | |
| October 10 | The Antlers | Blight | | Transgressive | |
| October 10 | The Autumn Defense | Here and Nowhere | | Yep Roc | |
| October 10 | Baker Boy | Djandjay | | Island Australia, Universal Music Australia | |
| October 10 | Bernie Leadon | Too Late to Be Cool | | | |
| October 10 | The Besnard Lakes | The Besnard Lakes Are the Ghost Nation | | | |
| October 10 | Bia | Bianca | | Epic | |
| October 10 | Black Eyes | Hostile Design | | Dischord | |
| October 10 | Blawan | SickElixir | | XL | |
| October 10 | Brian Eno and Beatie Wolfe | Liminal | Avant-pop | Verve | |
| October 10 | Calum Scott | Avenoir | Pop | Capitol | |
| October 10 | Charles Lloyd | Figure in Blue | | Blue Note | |
| October 10 | Ele A | Pixel | Pop rap, jazz rap, boom bap | EMI, Universal Music Italy | |
| October 10 | English Teacher | This Could Be a Remix Album | | Island | |
| October 10 | Flock of Dimes | The Life You Save | Folk | Sub Pop | |
| October 10 | HAAi | Humanise | Techno-pop | Mute | |
| October 10 | Harvey Sutherland | Debt | | Clarity Records | |
| October 10 | Jacob Collier | The Light for Days | Folk | | |
| October 10 | Jay Som | Belong | | Polyvinyl | |
| October 10 | Jerskin Fendrix | Once Upon a Time... in Shropshire | | Untitled (Recs) | |
| October 10 | John 5 | Ghost | | | |
| October 10 | Josh Levi | Hydraulic | | Raedio | |
| October 10 | Khalid | After the Sun Goes Down | R&B | Right Hand Music Group, RCA | |
| October 10 | LANY | Soft | | Sunset Garden, Virgin | |
| October 10 | Madi Diaz | Fatal Optimist | | Anti- | |
| October 10 | Madison Cunningham | Ace | Chamber pop, folk | Verve Forecast | |
| October 10 | Mobb Deep | Infinite | Hip-hop | Mass Appeal | |
| October 10 | Nemo | Arthouse | | Better Now Records | |
| October 10 | The Orb | Buddhist Hipsters | | Cooking Vinyl | |
| October 10 | OsamaSon | Psykotic | Rage | Atlantic | |
| October 10 | Perturbator | Age of Aquarius | | Nuclear Blast | |
| October 10 | PinkPantheress | Fancy Some More? | UK garage | Warner | |
| October 10 | Princess Nokia | Girls | | Artist House | |
| October 10 | Rhett Miller | A Lifetime of Riding by Night | | ATO | |
| October 10 | Richard Ashcroft | Lovin' You | | Virgin | |
| October 10 | Robert Finley | Hallelujah! Don't Let The Devil Fool Ya | | Easy Eye Sound | |
| October 10 | Sanguisugabogg | Hideous Aftermath | Death metal | Century Media | |
| October 10 | Tanita Tikaram | LIAR (Love Isn't a Right) | Pop rock | Cooking Vinyl | |
| October 10 | Testament | Para Bellum | Thrash metal, blackened death metal | Nuclear Blast | |
| October 10 | The Wytches | Talking Machine | | Alcopop! | |
| October 10 | Twice | Ten: The Story Goes On | | JYP | |
| October 10 | Vanessa Mai | Traumfabrik | Dance, pop, schlager | Warner | |
| October 10 | Yellowcard | Better Days | | Better Noise Music | |
| October 10 | Youth Group | Big Whoop | | Impressed Recordings | |
| October 13 | Nmixx | Blue Valentine | | JYP, Republic | |
| October 16 | Daddy Yankee | Lamento en Baile | | DY Records | |
| October 17 | All Time Low | Everyone's Talking! | | Basement Noise Records, Photo Finish, Virgin | |
| October 17 | Andrew Swift | Lucky Stars | | ABC | |
| October 17 | Ashnikko | Smoochies | Hyperpop | Parlophone | |
| October 17 | Bar Italia | Some Like It Hot | | Matador | |
| October 17 | bbno$ | bbno$ | | Republic | |
| October 17 | Biohazard | Divided We Fall | | BLKIIBLK Records | |
| October 17 | Boz Scaggs | Detour | Jazz, blues, soul | Concord | |
| October 17 | Bryant Barnes | Solace | | | |
| October 17 | Casey Dienel | My Heart Is an Outlaw | | Jealous Butcher Records | |
| October 17 | Chris Young | I Didn't Come Here to Leave | | Black River | |
| October 17 | Chrissie Hynde | Duets Special | | Parlophone | |
| October 17 | Coroner | Dissonance Theory | | Century Media | |
| October 17 | C.Y.M. (Chris Baio and Fort Romeau) | C.Y.M. | | | |
| October 17 | Fionn | Scum | | 604 | |
| October 17 | Good Luck | Big Dreams, Mister | | Lauren | |
| October 17 | Grailknights | Forever | Power metal | Reigning Phoenix | |
| October 17 | Gucci Mane | Episodes | | | |
| October 17 | Immortal Disfigurement | Hell Is Right in Front of Us | | Seek and Strike | |
| October 17 | The Last Dinner Party | From the Pyre | Baroque pop, art pop | Island | |
| October 17 | The Lemonheads | Love Chant | | Fire | |
| October 17 | Miles Kane | Sunlight in the Shadows | Indie rock | Easy Eye Sound | |
| October 17 | Militarie Gun | God Save the Gun | Melodic hardcore, post-hardcore | Loma Vista | |
| October 17 | Of Monsters and Men | All Is Love and Pain in the Mouse Parade | Indie rock, indie folk | Skarkali Records | |
| October 17 | Paz Lenchantin | Triste | | Hideous Human Records | |
| October 17 | Poliça | Dreams Go | | Memphis Industries | |
| October 17 | Rick Wakeman | Melancholia | | Madfish Records | |
| October 17 | Robin Zander | Robin Zander | | Confidential Records | |
| October 17 | Ruel | Kicking My Feet | | Giant Music | |
| October 17 | Ruen Brothers | Awooo | | Yep Roc | |
| October 17 | Sabaton | Legends | | Better Noise Music | |
| October 17 | Sam Ryder | Heartland | | Artist Theory Records | |
| October 17 | Silvana Estrada | Vendrán Suaves Lluvias | | Glassnote | |
| October 17 | Skullcrusher | And Your Song Is Like a Circle | | Dirty Hit | |
| October 17 | Soulwax | All Systems Are Lying | | Deewee, Because Music | |
| October 17 | Steve Martin and Alison Brown | Safe, Sensible and Sane | | Compass | |
| October 17 | Sudan Archives | The BPM | Dance | Stones Throw | |
| October 17 | Suzie True | How I Learned to Love What's Gone | | Get Better | |
| October 17 | Tame Impala | Deadbeat | Electronic, dance, psychedelia | Columbia | |
| October 17 | They Are Gutting a Body of Water | Lotto | | Smoking Room Records, ATO | |
| October 17 | Todd Snider | High, Lonesome and Then Some. | | Aimless Records | |
| October 17 | Tombs | Feral Darkness | | Redefining Darkness Records | |
| October 17 | Ty Dolla Sign | Tycoon | Hip-hop, R&B | Atlantic | |
| October 17 | William Prince | Further from the Country | | Six Shooter | |
| October 20 | Tomorrow X Together | Starkissed | | | |
| October 22 | Mitski | The Land: The Live Album | | Dead Oceans | |
| October 23 | Miguel | Caos | Alternative R&B | ByStorm Records, RCA | |
| October 24 | The Acacia Strain | You Are Safe from God Here | Metalcore, deathcore | Rise | |
| October 24 | The Alchemist and Hit-Boy | Goldfish | West Coast hip-hop | Empire | |
| October 24 | Amadou & Mariam | L'amour à La Folie | | Because | |
| October 24 | Antibalas | Hourglass | | | |
| October 24 | Artemas | Lovercore | | | |
| October 24 | Big Wreck | The Rest of the Story | | Sonic Unyon | |
| October 24 | Billy Currington | King of the World | | MCA Nashville | |
| October 24 | Brandi Carlile | Returning to Myself | Synth rock, Americana | Interscope, Lost Highway Records | |
| October 24 | Björk | Cornucopia Live | | One Little Independent | |
| October 24 | Bnyx | Loading... | | Data Club, Field Trip, Capitol | |
| October 24 | Catty | Bracing for Impact | | AWAL | |
| October 24 | Circa Waves | Death & Love | Indie rock | Lower Third, PIAS | |
| October 24 | Conjurer | Unself | | Nuclear Blast | |
| October 24 | Couch | Big Talk | | | |
| October 24 | Daniel Caesar | Son of Spergy | R&B, neo soul, gospel | Republic | |
| October 24 | Dave | The Boy Who Played the Harp | | Neighbourhood Recordings | |
| October 24 | Dayseeker | Creature in the Black Night | Metalcore, post-hardcore, melodic metalcore | Spinefarm | |
| October 24 | Demi Lovato | It's Not That Deep | Dance-pop | DLG Records, Island | |
| October 24 | Dion | The Rock 'n' Roll Philosopher | | KTBA Records | |
| October 24 | Eliza McLamb | Good Story | | Royal Mountain | |
| October 24 | Halle | Love?... or Something Like It | | Parkwood, Columbia | |
| October 24 | Hannah Jadagu | Describe | | Sub Pop | |
| October 24 | Henry Moodie | Mood Swings | | | |
| October 24 | Horace Silver | Silver in Seattle: Live at the Penthouse | | Blue Note | |
| October 24 | Ian | 2005 | | BuVision, Columbia | |
| October 24 | James Johnston | Where You'll Find Me | | Warner Music Australia | |
| October 24 | Jim White | Inner Day | | Drag City | |
| October 24 | Just Mustard | We Were Just Here | | Partisan | |
| October 24 | Leon Thomas | Pholks | | Ezmny Records, Motown | |
| October 24 | Lily Allen | West End Girl | Pop | BMG | |
| October 24 | Machine Girl | Psycho Warrior (MG Ultra X) | | Future Classic | |
| October 24 | Mammoth | The End | Rock, post-grunge | BMG | |
| October 24 | Mon Laferte | Femme Fatale | Jazz, bolero, Latin soul | Sony Music Latin | |
| October 24 | Monte Booker | Noise / Meaning | | EQT Records | |
| October 24 | Sadie Jean | Early Twenties Torture | Indie pop, alternative pop, soft pop | | |
| October 24 | Sean Mason | A Breath of Fresh Air | Jazz | Taylor Christian Records | |
| October 24 | Serj Tankian | Collaborations & Collages | | Serjical Strike Records, Create | |
| October 24 | Sigrid | There's Always More That I Could Say | | EMI Norway | |
| October 24 | Skye Newman | SE9 Part 1 | | Columbia | |
| October 24 | Soulfly | Chama | Groove metal, nu metal | Nuclear Blast | |
| October 24 | Spiritual Cramp | Rude | Punk rock | Blue Grape Music | |
| October 24 | Steve Tibbetts | Close | | ECM | |
| October 24 | Sumo Cyco | Neon Void | | Cyco City Records | |
| October 24 | Tortoise | Touch | Post-rock | International Anthem, Nonesuch | |
| October 27 | Aesop Rock | I Heard It's a Mess There Too | Hip-hop | Rhymesayers | |
| October 30 | Icewear Vezzo | Purple Passion | | Iced Up Records | |
| October 30 | Saba | Coffee! | | Saba Pivot LLC | |
| October 31 | Anna von Hausswolff | Iconoclasts | | Year0001 | |
| October 31 | Armani White | There's a Ghost in My House | | Legendbound, Def Jam | |
| October 31 | Avatar | Don't Go in the Forest | | Black Waltz Records | |
| October 31 | The Belair Lip Bombs | Again | Indie rock | Third Man | |
| October 31 | Big L | Harlem's Finest: Return of the King | | Mass Appeal | |
| October 31 | Cat Burns | How to Be Human | Pop, indie pop | Since '93, RCA | |
| October 31 | The Charlatans | We Are Love | | BMG | |
| October 31 | Chat Pile and Hayden Pedigo | In the Earth Again | Alternative rock | Computer Students Records, The Flenser | |
| October 31 | Claire Rousay | A Little Death | | Thrill Jockey | |
| October 31 | Creeper | Sanguivore II: Mistress of Death | Gothic rock, glam metal | Spinefarm | |
| October 31 | Daniel Avery | Tremor | | Domino | |
| October 31 | Despised Icon | Shadow Work | | Nuclear Blast | |
| October 31 | DJ Premier and Ransom | The Reinvention | | To the Top | |
| October 31 | Florence and the Machine | Everybody Scream | | Polydor | |
| October 31 | Greensky Bluegrass | XXV | | | |
| October 31 | Guided by Voices | Thick Rich and Delicious | | Guided by Voices, Inc. | |
| October 31 | Keiyaa | Hooke's Law | | XL | |
| October 31 | Kodak Black | Just Getting Started | Hip-hop | Vulture Love, Capitol | |
| October 31 | Laura Cox | Trouble Coming | | earMusic | |
| October 31 | Lil Gotit and Lil Keed | Fraternal: Keed Edition | | ONErpm | |
| October 31 | Lloyd Banks | HHVI: The Six of Swords | | Money by Any Means, Inc. | |
| October 31 | Lunatic Soul | The World Under Unsun | | Inside Out Music | |
| October 31 | Luvcat | Vicious Delicious | | AWAL | |
| October 31 | Lydia Luce | Mammoth | | | |
| October 31 | Makaya McCraven | Techno Logic | | XL | |
| October 31 | Makaya McCraven | The People's Mixtape | | XL | |
| October 31 | Makaya McCraven | Hidden Out! | | XL | |
| October 31 | Makaya McCraven | PopUp Shop | | XL | |
| October 31 | Offset | Haunted by Fame | | Motown | |
| October 31 | Saintseneca | High Walllow & Supermoon Songs | | Lame-O | |
| October 31 | Sevdaliza | Heroina | Latin pop | Broke, Create Music | |
| October 31 | Shlohmo | Repulsor | | | |
| October 31 | Snocaps | Snocaps | Indie rock, indie folk | Anti- | |
| October 31 | Westside Gunn | Heels Have Eyes 3 | | Griselda, Roc Nation | |

=== November ===
List of albums released in November 2025
Go to: January | February | March | April | May | June | July | August | September | October | November | December | Back to top
| Release date | Artist | Album | Genre | Label | Ref. |
| November 5 | Juana Molina | Doga | Experimental, electronfic | Sonamos | |
| November 5 | Slayr | Half Blood | Trap | Columbia | |
| November 6 | Khruangbin | The Universe Smiles Upon You II | | | |
| November 7 | 1900Rugrat | Big Ah Kidz | Rage, trap | 300 | |
| November 7 | Agnostic Front | Echoes in Eternity | Hardcore punk | Reigning Phoenix | |
| November 7 | Allie X | Happiness Is Going to Get You | | | |
| November 7 | Armand Hammer and the Alchemist | Mercy | Hip-hop | Backwoodz Studioz, Rhymesayers | |
| November 7 | Astronoid | Stargod | | | |
| November 7 | Benee | Ur an Angel I'm Just Particles | | Republic | |
| November 7 | Brad Paisley | Snow Globe Town | | | |
| November 7 | Caskets | The Only Heaven You'll Know | | SharpTone | |
| November 7 | Charlotte de Witte | Charlotte de Witte | | KNTXT | |
| November 7 | Clark | Steep Stims | Electronic, IDM, experimental | Throttle Records | |
| November 7 | Danny Brown | Stardust | | Warp | |
| November 7 | The Dears | Life Is Beautiful! Life Is Beautiful! Life Is Beautiful! | Indie rock | Next Door Records | |
| November 7 | Del Water Gap | Chasing the Chimera | | Mom + Pop Music | |
| November 7 | DJ Snake | Nomad | | Interscope | |
| November 7 | Drain | ...Is Your Friend | | Epitaph | |
| November 7 | Esprit D'Air | Aeons | Alternative metal, nu metal, electronicore | Starstorm Records | |
| November 7 | Fickle Friends | Fickle Friends | | Palmeira Music | |
| November 7 | Finger Eleven | Last Night on Earth | Alternative rock, post-grunge, hard rock | Better Noise | |
| November 7 | Giorgia | G | Pop, R&B, neo soul | Epic, Sony Music | |
| November 7 | Hatchie | Liquorice | Dream pop, shoegaze | Secretly Canadian | |
| November 7 | Jake Owen | Dreams to Dream | | Good Company | |
| November 7 | Jordana | Jordanaland | | Grand Jury | |
| November 7 | Kali Malone and Drew McDowall | Magnetism | | Ideologic Organ | |
| November 7 | Mavis Staples | Sad and Beautiful World | | Anti- | |
| November 7 | Midlake | A Bridge to Far | | Believe | |
| November 7 | The Mountain Goats | Through This Fire Across from Peter Balkan | Indie folk | Cadmean Dawn | |
| November 7 | Omnium Gatherum | May the Bridges We Burn Light the Way | Melodic death metal | Century Media | |
| November 7 | Paul Kelly | Seventy | | EMI | |
| November 7 | Portugal. The Man | Shish | | KNIK Records, Thirty Tigers | |
| November 7 | Pupil Slicer | Fleshwork | | Prosthetic | |
| November 7 | Rosalía | Lux | Classical, experimental pop | Columbia | |
| November 7 | Sam Gellaitry | Anywhere Here Is Perfect | | Major Recordings | |
| November 7 | Set It Off | Set It Off | Alternative metal, nu metal, post hardcore | | |
| November 7 | Sorry | Cosplay | | Domino | |
| November 7 | Stella Donnelly | Love and Fortune | | Dot Dash, Remote Control | |
| November 7 | Teen Jesus and the Jean Teasers | Glory | | Mom + Pop | |
| November 7 | Tiny Vipers | Tormentor | | | |
| November 7 | Trisha Yearwood | Christmastime | | Virgin, Gwendolyn Records | |
| November 7 | White Lies | Night Light | Indie rock, new wave, post-punk revival | PIAS | |
| November 7 | Whitney | Small Talk | | AWAL | |
| November 7 | Willie Nelson | Workin' Man: Willie Sings Merle | Country | Legacy | |
| November 7 | Young Miko | Do Not Disturb | | Capitol | |
| November 11 | Jowee Omicil | Smiles | | | |
| November 11 | Navy Blue | The Sword & the Soaring | Hip-hop | Freedom Sounds | |
| November 14 | 1914 | Viribus Unitis | Blackened death metal, death-doom | Napalm | |
| November 14 | 5 Seconds of Summer | Everyone's a Star! | | Republic | |
| November 14 | Austra | Chin Up Buttercup | | Domino | |
| November 14 | AVTT/PTTN (The Avett Brothers and Mike Patton) | AVTT/PTTN | | Thirty Tigers, Ipecac | |
| November 14 | Bell Witch and Aerial Ruin | Stygian Bough Vol. II | | Profound Lore | |
| November 14 | Bill Orcutt | Another Perfect Day | | Palilalia Records | |
| November 14 | Celeste | Woman of Faces | Jazz, soul, pop | Polydor | |
| November 14 | Chad Taylor Quintet | Smoke Shifter | | Otherly Love Records | |
| November 14 | Cheap Trick | All Washed Up | | BMG | |
| November 14 | Colter Wall | Memories and Empties | Country | La Honda Records, RCA | |
| November 14 | The Devil Wears Prada | Flowers | Metalcore | Solid State | |
| November 14 | FKA Twigs | Eusexua Afterglow | | Atlantic, Young | |
| November 14 | Thee Headcoatees | Man-Trap | | Damaged Goods | |
| November 14 | Home Front | Watch It Die | | La Vida Es Un Mus | |
| November 14 | Ina Müller | 6.0 | | | |
| November 14 | Jake Xerxes Fussell and James Elkington | Rebuilding | | Fat Possum | |
| November 14 | Juvenile | Boiling Point | | DNA Music Group, Hitmaker Distro | |
| November 14 | Kelsea Ballerini | Mount Pleasant | | Black River | |
| November 14 | Men Without Hats | On the Moon | | | |
| November 14 | The Neighbourhood | Ultrasound | | Warner | |
| November 14 | Of Mice & Men | Another Miracle | Metalcore, hard rock | Century Media | |
| November 14 | Orville Peck | Appaloosa | | Warner | |
| November 14 | Picture Parlour | The Parlour | | | |
| November 14 | Ragana and Drowse | Ash Souvenir | | | |
| November 14 | Runo Plum | Patching | | Winspear | |
| November 14 | Summer Walker | Finally Over It | R&B | Interscope | |
| November 14 | Tony Molina | On This Day | Folk pop, power pop, baroque pop | Slumberland | |
| November 14 | Wale | Everything Is a Lot | Hip-hop, Afrobeats | Def Jam | |
| November 14 | Winterpills | This Is How We Dance | | Signature Sounds | |
| November 14 | XO | Fashionably Late | Dance-pop, electropop | Polydor | |
| November 19 | NiziU | New Emotion | | Epic Japan | |
| November 20 | Bini | Flames | | Star | |
| November 20 | María Becerra | Quimera | | Warner Music Latina | |
| November 21 | Aerosmith and Yungblud | One More Time | | Capitol | |
| November 21 | Alamat | Destino | | Viva | |
| November 21 | Bloodbound | Field of Swords | | Napalm | |
| November 21 | Danko Jones | Leo Rising | | Sonic Unyon, Perception Records | |
| November 21 | De La Soul | Cabin in the Sky | Hip-hop | Mass Appeal | |
| November 21 | Ella Eyre | Everything, in Time | | PIAS | |
| November 21 | Glitterer | Erer | | Purple Circle Records | |
| November 21 | Haley Heynderickx and Max García Conover | What of Our Nature | | Fat Possum | |
| November 21 | The Hellp | Riviera | | Anemoia Records, Atlantic | |
| November 21 | Kara-Lis Coverdale | Changes in Air | | | |
| November 21 | Keaton Henson | Parader | | PIAS | |
| November 21 | No Angels | It's Christmas | | | |
| November 21 | Oneohtrix Point Never | Tranquilizer | | Warp | |
| November 21 | R.A.P. Ferreira and Kenny Segal | The Night Green Side of It | | Ruby Yacht, Alpha Pup | |
| November 21 | The Smith Street Band | Once I Was Wild | | | |
| November 21 | SoFaygo | Mania | | | |
| November 21 | Spock's Beard | The Archaeoptimist | | Madfish Records | |
| November 21 | Stray Kids | Do It | | JYP, Republic | |
| November 21 | Stryper | The Greatest Gift of All | Christian rock, heavy metal | Frontiers | |
| November 21 | Tems | Love Is a Kingdom | Alternative R&B, Afrobeats | Since '93, RCA | |
| November 21 | Tommy Richman | Worlds Apart | | | |
| November 21 | Wicked movie cast, Cynthia Erivo and Ariana Grande | Wicked: For Good – The Soundtrack | | Republic, Verve | |
| November 22 | G22 | The Dissection of Eve | | Cornerstone Entertainment | |
| November 25 | Mavi | The Pilot | Hip-hop | Loma Vista | |
| November 26 | Lazer Dim 700 | Stikkz n Stonez | | | |
| November 28 | Blut Aus Nord | Ethereal Horizons | | | |
| November 28 | Corpus Delicti | Liminal | | | |
| November 28 | Equilibrium | Equinox | | Nuclear Blast | |
| November 28 | Ikonika | Sad | | Hyperdub | |
| November 28 | Jessie J | Don't Tease Me with a Good Time | | | |
| November 28 | Kraftklub | Sterben in Karl-Marx-Stadt | | | |
| November 28 | The Saints | Long March Through the Jazz Age | Rock, blues rock, punk blues | Fire | |
| November 28 | South Arcade | Play! | | LAB | |
| November 28 | These New South Whales | Godspeed | | | |

=== December ===
List of albums released in December 2025
Go to: January | February | March | April | May | June | July | August | September | October | November | December | Back to top
| Release date | Artist | Album | Genre | Label | Ref. |
| December 3 | Lil Baby | The Leaks | | Glass Window Entertainment, Quality Control, Motown | |
| December 4 | Redveil | Sankofa | | Fashionably Early | |
| December 5 | Alison Wonderland | Ghost World | | EMI Australia | |
| December 5 | Anna of the North | Girl in a Bottle | | PIAS | |
| December 5 | Daniel Knox | Mercado 48 | | H. P. Johnson Presents | |
| December 5 | Depeche Mode | Memento Mori: Mexico City | | Columbia | |
| December 5 | Dove Ellis | Blizzard | | Black Butter, AMF Records | |
| December 5 | Melody's Echo Chamber | Unclouded | | Domino | |
| December 5 | Nick Cave and the Bad Seeds | Live God | | Bad Seed Ltd., PIAS | |
| December 5 | NOFX | A to H | | Fat Wreck Chords | |
| December 5 | Seeming | The World | | Artoffact Records | |
| December 5 | TEED | Always with Me | | Nice Age | |
| December 5 | Tom Smith | There Is Nothing in the Dark Which Isn't There in the Light | | | |
| December 5 | Tourist | Music Is Invisible | | | |
| December 5 | Upon a Burning Body | Blood of the Bull | | | |
| December 5 | Zac Brown Band | Love & Fear | | | |
| December 10 | Lilas Ikuta | Laugh | J-pop | Echoes, Sony Japan | |
| December 11 | Health | Conflict DLC | Electro-industrial, industrial metal | Loma Vista | |
| December 12 | 21 Savage | What Happened to the Streets? | | Slaughter Gang, Epic | |
| December 12 | Boy & Bear | Tripping Over Time | | Boy & Bear | |
| December 12 | Conway the Machine | You Can't Kill God with Bullets | East Coast hip-hop | Drumwork Music Group | |
| December 12 | Fucked Up | Grass Can Move Stones Part 1: Year of the Goat | | Tankcrimes | |
| December 12 | Juliana Hatfield | Lightning Might Strike | Indie rock | American Laundromat | |
| December 12 | Lord of the Lost | Opve Noir Vol 2 | | | |
| December 12 | Nas and DJ Premier | Light-Years | Hip-hop | Mass Appeal | |
| December 12 | Pebe Sebert | Pebe Sebert | | Kesha Records | |
| December 12 | Rotten Sound | Mass Extinction | | | |
| December 12 | Snow tha Product | Before I Crashout | | | |
| December 12 | This Is Lorelei | Holo Boy | Rock | Double Double Whammy | |
| December 12 | Volumes | Mirror Touch | | Fearless | |
| December 19 | Peter Criss | Peter Criss | | Silvercat Records | |
| December 23 | Max B | Public Domain 7: The Purge | | | |
| December 24 | Chance the Rapper and Jeremih | Secret Santa | | | |
| December 31 | Ulver | Neverland | | House of Mythology Records | |
