= Thinking, Dreaming, Scheming =

Studio album by Lightheaded
- Released: June 27, 2025
- Genre: Indie pop
- Length: 28:24
- Label: Slumberland

Lightheaded chronology
Combustible Gems (2024)	Thinking, Dreaming, Scheming (2025)

Thinking, Dreaming, Scheming is the studio album by American indie pop band Lightheaded. It was released on June 27, 2025, via Slumberland in LP, CD and digital formats.

== Background ==
Consisting of tracks ranging between one and four minutes, with a total runtime of approximately twenty-eight minutes, including five songs from the band's Good Good Great! EP, the album was noted as an indie pop album.

== Reception ==
Professional ratings
Review scores
Source	Rating
AllMusic	4/5 stars
Record Collector	4/5 stars
Spill	4/5 stars

AllMusic described the album as "indie pop at its life-affirming best, guaranteed to break hearts and lift spirits at the same time while delivering one hummable tune after another."

Record Collector's Johnnie Johnstone rated the album four stars and referred to it as a "cracker" and "lovely". Spill assigned it a rating of four out of five, noting it encompassing "a great sense of melody, great guitar lines, and excellent vocals to match."

== Track listing ==
Thinking, Dreaming, Scheming track listing
No.	Title	Length
1.	"Same Drop"	3:14
2.	"The Lindens, the Lindens, the Lindens!"	1:48
3.	"Me and Amelia Fletcher"	1:28
4.	"The View from Your Room"	1:59
5.	"Crash Landing of the Clod"	3:51
6.	"Mercury Girl"	3:52
7.	"Orange Creamsicle Head"	3:27
8.	"The Garden"	1:56
9.	"Patti Girl"	2:19
10.	"Love Is Overrated"	4:30
Total length:		28:24
