= Something Soft =

Studio album by M(h)aol
- Released: May 16, 2025
- Length: 29:54
- Label: Merge
- Producers: Jamie Hyland; Sean Nolan

M(h)aol chronology
Attachment Styles (2023)	Something Soft (2025)

Singles from Something Soft
- 1. "DM:AM" Released: 6 March 2025

Something Soft is the second studio album by Irish post-punk group M(h)aol. It was released on Merge Records on 16 May 2025.

== Background ==
Featuring eleven songs with a total runtime of approximately thirty-minutes, each with a length between one and two minutes excluding the opening and closing tracks. The album incorporates the theme of feminism, and was produced by Jamie Hyland and Sean Nolan.

The first single of the album, "DM:AM", was released on 6 March 2025.

== Reception ==
Professional ratings
Review scores
Source	Rating
AllMusic	3.5/5 stars
DIY	4/5 stars
Dork	4/5 stars
Hot Press	8/10 stars
Paste	8/10 stars

AllMusic rated the album three and a half stars out of five and stated, "While the distinctive Ghearailt may be missed, Keane holds her own, and it's good to hear M(h)aol's too-underrepresented take on the zeitgeist continue on." Hot Press gave it a rating of eight out of ten and noted it as showing "impressive growth" from its predecessor, describing it as "brimming with intelligent and incisive lyrics, Something Soft is also sure to get heads banging."

Paste remarked, "It's a testament to Hyland's talent that the noisier moments—and the album is full of them, rendering the title Something Soft another droll joke—feel notably distinct from each other," assigning the album a rating of 8.0 out of ten. DIY, rating Something Soft four stars, commented that it "becomes clear that the record is very much antithetical to its namesake" and "refuses to let up from its scorching ferocity, showcasing M(h)aol as an out-and-out force." It was referred to as "a record with absolutely nothing soft about it," by Dork reviewer Ciaran Picker, who gave it a score of four out of five.

== Track listing ==
Something Soft track listing
No.	Title	Length
1.	"Pursuit"	3:26
2.	"I Miss My Dog"	2:30
3.	"You Are Temporary, the Internet Is Forever"	2:30
4.	"DM:AM"	2:11
5.	"E8/N16"	1:50
6.	"Vin Diesel"	2:53
7.	"Clementine"	2:57
8.	"Snare"	3:29
9.	"IBS"	1:27
10.	"1-800-Call-Me-Back"	2:41
11.	"Coda"	4:00
Total length:		29:54

== Personnel ==
Credits for Something Soft adapted from Bandcamp.

- Constance Keane – drums, vocals, lyrics
- Jamie Hyland – bass, vocals, recording, production, mixing, mastering, lyrics, photography
- Sean Nolan – guitar
- Sarah Deegan – bass
- Zoë Greenway – bass, vocals (tracks 1, 7, 11)
- Dara Kiely – vocals (track 7)
