= Runo Plum =

American musician

Runo Plum is an American indie rock musician from Minneapolis. She is currently signed to the record label Winspear.

== History ==
In early 2025, Plum released a song with the Austin, Texas-based band Hovvdy. In July 2025, Plum announced she had signed to the record label Winspear and released a new song titled "Lemon Garland". In August 2025, Plum announced her debut album, Patching, to be released on November 14, 2025. Alongside the announcement, Plum released the single "Sickness". Since the announcement of the album, Plum has released the singles "Halfway up the Lawn" and "Pond".

== Discography ==
Studio albums

- Patching (2025, Winspear)
