= The Hearth and Circle Round Fire =

2025 single by the English rock band Squid

Single by Squid
- Released: 23 April 2025
- Genre: Art-rock; punk
- Length: 6:14; 3:41 (edit)
- Label: Warp
- Producers: Dan Carey, Marta Salogni, Grace Banks

Squid singles chronology
"Cro-Magnon Man" (2025)	"The Hearth and Circle Round Fire" (2025)

"The Hearth and Circle Round Fire" is a song by British band Squid. It was released on 23 April 2025 through Warp Records. Originating as an outtake from their third studio album, Cowards, the song was released on a 10" included with the deluxe edition of the album on 7 February, and later on streaming services on 23 April. Critics responded positively to the song, noting its art-rock and punk influences.

== Background ==
Squid is a British band made up of Ollie Judge, Louis Borlase, Arthur Leadbetter, Laurie Nankivell and Anton Pearson. The band would release EPs and singles throughout 2017 to 2020 such as Lino, "The Dial" and Town Centre. Their debut album, Bright Green Field, would arrive in 2021, followed by O Monolith in 2023. Their third studio album, Cowards, would release on 7 February 2025 to critical acclaim.

== Music and lyrics ==
Musically, "The Hearth and Circle Round Fire" has been described as art-rock and punk. The song originated as an outtake from Cowards. According to the band's lead vocalist and drummer Ollie Judge, the song came together "quite easily" but the band were dissatisfied, so they "decided to record it as a 15 minute jam, rip it apart and tape it back together".

The song's lyrics were inspired from the "dystopian worlds of Ray Bradbury's Fahrenheit 451 and Kay Dick's They". More specifically, the track discusses themes of censorship and propaganda, with "only a small amount of people willing to fight against it". Robin Murray of Clash noted how the track was "glued together by the band's live ferocity" which lent the song a "tenacious punk energy".

== Release and reception ==
"The Hearth and Circle Round Fire" was originally released on 7 February through Warp, as part of a bonus 10" for the deluxe edition of Cowards. The deluxe edition was only available from independent retailers and the band's website. The song was officially released on streaming services on 23 April, three days before the band played at the Roundhouse.

Critics responded positively to the song. In an article for Clash, Robin Murray said the song "retains aspects of the potent DNA that drove Cowards to such heights, with the cut 'n' paste methodology acting as a disruptive force". Danielle Chelosky of Stereogum called the song "another amazing art-rock epic".

== Track listing ==
The Hearth and Circle Round Fire track listing
No.	Title	Length
1.	"The Hearth and Circle Round Fire"	6:14
2.	"The Hearth and Circle Round Fire (edit)" ( (Note: The edited version of the song is not present on physical editions; only on streaming services.))	3:41
Total length:		9:56

== Personnel ==
Credits are adapted from the physical deluxe edition of Cowards.

=== Squid ===
- Louis Borlase – guitar, bass guitar, vocals
- Ollie Judge – drums, lead vocals
- Arthur Leadbetter – keyboards
- Laurie Nankivell – bass guitar, brass, percussion
- Anton Pearson – guitar, bass, vocals, percussion

=== Technical ===
- Marta Salogni – production, recording, additional engineering
- Grace Banks – engineering, additional production
- Dan Carey – additional production
- Heba Kadry – mastering
- John McEntire – mixing
- Chiara Ferracuti – additional engineering

=== Additional musicians ===
- Zands Duggan – additional percussion
