= Marta Salogni =

Background information
- Origin: Capriolo, Italy
- Genres: Alternative rock, electronic, experimental, pop
- Occupations: Record producer, audio engineer
- Years active: 2010–present
- Website: martasalogni.com

Marta Salogni is an Italian record producer, mixer and recording engineer.

== Background ==
Salogni's musical background was cultivated in her native Italy between the small town of Capriolo, Brescia, where she spent her formative years, collaborating with musical acts of all styles.

She started working as a live sound engineer for the local social centre Magazzino 47 and independent radio station Radio Onda D'Urto, non-profit left-wing venues and counterculture organizations for a variety of gigs, festivals, and theatre productions. After moving to London in 2010, she took a 9-month course at Alchemea College of Audio Engineering to learn Pro Tools, and shortly after began her career working as a recording engineer across major recording studios both nationally and internationally.

== Production career ==
As a producer and mixer, Salogni has worked with Björk, Depeche Mode, Gorillaz, Sharon Van Etten, English Teacher, Romy, M.I.A., Groove Armada, Animal Collective, Black Midi, Squid, HAAi, Lucrecia Dalt, Bar Italia, Westerman, Philip Selway, Jayda G, Circuit Des Yeux, Dream Wife, Holly Herndon, Porridge Radio, Anna Meredith, Ela Minus, Kim Deal, Subsonica, Methyl Ethyl, Lafawndah, Puma Blue, KÁRYYN, Planningtorock, Daniel Avery, Duval Timothy, Emel Mathlouthi, Factory Floor, Kelela, Liars, Alex Cameron, Daniel Blumberg, Little Boots, Temples, Grimm Grimm, the Orielles, HMLTD, and Django Django.

As an engineer, Salogni worked with producers such as Danton Supple, James Ford and David Wrench. Alongside Wrench, she has worked on projects with Frank Ocean, the xx, Goldfrapp, FKA Twigs, Blossoms, Glass Animals, Shura, Bloc Party, and LA Priest. She also worked on Tracey Thorn's 2018 Record alongside producer Ewan Pearson.

Salogni has worked with the record labels XL Recordings, Young, Mute, DFA Records, Virgin EMI Records, 4AD, Polydor Records, Domino Recording Company, Heavenly Recordings, Sony Music, Universal Music and One Little Independent Records.

Marta was awarded the MPG (Music Producer's Guild) Breakthrough Engineer of the Year 2018, Breakthrough Producer of the Year 2020 and UK Music Producer of the Year 2022.

She recorded and mixed the 2023 Depeche Mode album Memento Mori with James Ford, who had produced the band's previous album Spirit.

In September 2024, English Teacher's album This Could Be Texas won the Mercury Prize which was produced and mixed by Salogni and she was honoured with the Producer of the Year at the Billboard Italia Women in Music.

== Live shows ==
Salogni creates both composed and improvised live sets using tape machines, loops, and feedback. She has performed at several notable events, including Le Guess Who? in 2023, curated by Heba Kadry, where she played alongside Valentina Magaletti on drums. In her second performance at Le Guess Who?, Salogni presented a solo set dedicated to the works of Pauline Anna Strom. At the Linecheck Festival 2023, she performed "Music for Open Spaces", a project she collaborated on with Tom Relleen. This marked the project's second live performance, following its debut at Cafe Oto in London during the LP release.

In 2024, Salogni performed at the Meakusma Festival with Melos Kalpa, showcasing music from their album, Melos Kalpa. She also participated in the Robot Festival with Francesco Fonassi, where they premiered their collaborative work, Orafiroe.

== Free Youth Orchestra ==
Salogni founded and actively runs a charity called Free Youth Orchestra. This organisation provides free access to musical equipment and lessons through workshops led by local musicians. The charity's ethos focuses on learning through play and experimentation, welcoming all children regardless of their socio-economic background. It was established in memory of Tom Relleen. To support fundraising for the charity, Salogni collaborated with Floating Points on a remix of the Tomaga track "Intimate Intensity". This remix was released on Bandcamp through the Free Youth Orchestra site and accompanied by an original track titled "A Call from the Eaves", which was included in a special edition vinyl released by Phonica in 2023.

== Production and mixing credits ==
| Year | Artist | Release | Credit |
|---|---|---|---|
| 2014 | These New Puritans | Album EXPANDED Live At The Barbican | Additional Engineer |
| 2014 | Philip Selway | Album Weatherhouse | Engineer - Vocals |
| 2014 | Cristobal And The Sea | EP Peach Bells | Engineer |
| 2014 | Beth Ditto | Track 'Cerrone's Supernature' | Engineer |
| 2015 | FKA Twigs | EP M3LL155X | Mix Assistant & Additional Vocal Engineering |
| 2015 | M.I.A | Single 'Swords' | Mix Engineer |
| 2015 | LA Priest | Album Inji | Engineer |
| 2015 | LE1F | Single 'Rage' | Engineer |
| 2015 | Dave Gahan & Soulsavers | Album Angels & Ghost | Mix assistant |
| 2016 | Frank Ocean | Track ‘Self Control’ from album Blonde | Engineer |
| 2016 | Glass Animals | Album How To Be A Human Being | Engineer |
| 2016 | M.I.A | Album AIM | Recording Engineer |
| 2016 | Blossoms | Album Blossoms | Engineer |
| 2016 | Hero Fisher | Album Glue Moon | Production & Mix |
| 2016 | Georgia Ruth | Album Fossil Scale | Co-production & Mix |
| 2016 | Shura | Single The Space Tapes | Additional Mix |
| 2016 | Shura | Album Nothing’s Real | Engineer |
| 2016 | Petrol Girls | EP Some Thing | Co-production, Engineer & Mix |
| 2016 | TwoMonkeys | Album WHATT? | Production & Mix |
| 2016 | Factory Floor | Album 25 25 | Engineer |
| 2016 | Bloc Party | Album Hymns | Mix assistant |
| 2016 | TOY | Album Clear Shot | Engineer |
| 2017 | Björk | Album Utopia | Mix |
| 2017 | Kelela | Track ‘Take Me Apart’ from album Take Me Apart | Additional Mix |
| 2017 | Sampha | Album Process | Mix assistant |
| 2017 | Alex Cameron | Single ‘Runnin’ Outta Luck’ | Mix |
| 2017 | The xx | Album I See You | Engineer |
| 2017 | Goldfrapp | Album Silver Eye | Engineer |
| 2017 | Liars | Album Tfcf B-Sides | Mix |
| 2017 | Sampha | Single 'Plastic 100°C (Live Performance)' | Mix |
| 2017 | Tomaga | EP Memory In Vivo Exposure | Mix |
| 2017 | White Lies | Track ‘Right Place’ from album Friends | Mix |
| 2017 | Temples | Album Volcano | Engineer |
| 2018 | Daniel Blumberg | Track ‘Minus’ from album Minus | Mix |
| 2018 | Sampha | Beautiful Boy Soundtrack Album Track ‘Treasure’ | Mix |
| 2018 | Factory Floor | Double A-Side Heart of Data/Babel 12” | Mix |
| 2018 | David Byrne | Album American Utopia | Engineer |
| 2018 | Let's Eat Grandma | Album I'm All Ears | Engineer |
| 2018 | Planningtorock | Album Powerhouse | Mix |
| 2018 | Tracey Thorn | Tracks from album Record | Recording engineer |
| 2018 | Django Django | Album Marble Skies | Mix |
| 2018 | Iwan Huws | Album Mis Mêl | Production & Mix |
| 2019 | Bon Iver | Album i,i | Engineer |
| 2019 | Holly Herndon | Album PROTO | Mix |
| 2019 | Daniel Blumberg | EP Liv | Mix |
| 2019 | Anna Meredith | Album Fibs | Mix |
| 2019 | Lafawndah | Album Ancestor Boy | Mix |
| 2019 | Shura | Album Forevher | Mix |
| 2019 | No Bra | Album Love & Power | Mix |
| 2019 | CHAI | Tracks ‘Fashionista’ & ‘Curly Haired Adventure’ | Mix |
| 2019 | YAK | Album Pursuit of Momentary Happiness | Production |
| 2019 | Methyl Ethel | Album Triage | Mix |
| 2019 | Emel Mathlouthi | Single ‘Footsteps’ | Mix |
| 2019 | Stealing Sheep | Album Big Wows | Mix |
| 2020 | Dream Wife | Album So When You Gonna… | Production & Mix |
| 2020 | Romy | Single ‘Lifetime’ | Co-production |
| 2020 | Erland Cooper & Marta Salogni | Album Landform | Mix |
| 2020 | The Orielles | Album Disco Volador | Production & Mix |
| 2020 | Puma Blue | Singles ‘Sunflower’ & ‘Velvet Leaves’ | Mix |
| 2020 | Ela Minus | Album Acts of Rebellion | Mix |
| 2020 | Daniel Avery | Album Light + Love | Mix |
| 2020 | Daniel Avery & Alessandro Cortini | Album Illusion of Time | Mix |
| 2020 | Charlotte Dos Santos | Tracks ‘Harvest Time’ & ‘Helio’ | Mix |
| 2020 | El Hardwick | Album 8 | Mix |
| 2020 | Groove Armada | Track ‘Tripwire’ (feat. Nick Littlemore) from album Edge of the Horizon | Mix |
| 2020 | The Orielles | Album Silver Dollar Moment | Production & Mix |
| 2020 | Mica Levi | Album Ruff Dog | Master |
| 2020 | MOHIT | Album Preface | Production & Mix |
| 2021 | Circuit des Yeux | Album -io | Mix |
| 2021 | Animal Collective | Album Time Skiffs | Mix |
| 2021 | Duval Timothy and Rosie Lowe | Album Son | Mix |
| 2021 | Daniel Avery | Album Together In Static | Mix |
| 2021 | Gazelle Twin & NYX | Album Deep England | Co-production & Mix |
| 2021 | Floating Points and Marta Salogni | Single ‘Intimate Immensity (Remix)’ & 'A Call From The Eaves' | Co-production & Mix |
| 2021 | Lady Gaga | Remix Single ‘1000 Doves planningtorock’ | Mix |
| 2021 | Tomaga | Album Intimate Immensity | Mix |
| 2021 | Erland Cooper | Album Holm (Variations & B-Sides) | Production & Mix |
| 2021 | Isobel Waller-Bridge | Single 'Illuminations' | Mix |
| 2021 | Mica Levi | Album Blue Alibi | Master |
| 2022 | Depeche Mode | Album Memento Mori | Mix |
| 2022 | Daniel Avery | Album Ultra Truth | Mix |
| 2022 | Lucrecia Dalt | Album ¡Ay! | Mix |
| 2022 | EDEN | Album ICYMI | Mix |
| 2022 | Lucrecia Dalt | Album Ay | Mix |
| 2022 | HAAi | Album Baby We’re Ascending | Mix |
| 2022 | Nik Void | Album Bucked Up Space | Mix |
| 2023 | Marta Salogni & Tom Relleen | Album Music For Open Spaces | Writing, Co-production & Mix |
| 2023 | Bar Italia | Album Tracey Denim | Mix |
| 2023 | Westerman | Album An Inbuilt Fault | Mix |
| 2023 | Jayda G | Album Guy | Mix |
| 2023 | Desire Marea | Album On The Romance of Being | Mix |
| 2023 | Philip Selway | Album Strange Dance | Production & Mix |
| 2024 | Kim Deal | Album Nobody Loves You More | Mix |
| 2024 | Gazelle Twin | Track 'A Door Opens' from album Shadow Dogs | Tape remix / Production & Mix |
| 2024 | Circuit des Yeux | Singles 'God Dick' | Mix |
| 2024 | Melos Kalpa | Album Melos Kalpa | Writing, Production & Mix |
| 2024 | Alessandro Cortini | Album NATI INFINITI | Mix & Master |
| 2024 | Martha Skye Murphy | Album Um | Mix |
| 2024 | Bar Italia | EP The Tw*ts | Mix |
| 2024 | English Teacher | Album This Could Be Texas | Production & Mix |
| 2024 | Subsonica | Album Realtà Aumentata | Mix |
| 2024 | Erland Cooper | Single 'Magnus' | Mix |
| 2024 | Erland Cooper | Album Carve The Runes Then Be Content With Silence | Recording & Mix |
| 2025 | Björk | Concert film & album Cornucopia Live | Mix |
| 2025 | NYX | Album NYX | Co-production & Mix |
| 2025 | Squid | Album Cowards | Production |
| 2025 | Sharon Van Etten | Album Sharon Van Etten & The Attachment Theory | Production & Mix |
| 2025 | Circuit des Yeux | Album Halo On The Inside | Mix |
| 2025 | Ela Minus | Album DIA | Mix |
| 2025 | Shura | Singles 'Recognise', 'World's Worst Girlfriend' & 'I Wanna Be Loved By You' from album I Got Too Sad For My Friends | Mix |
| 2025 | Guedra Guedra | Album MUTANT | Mix |
| 2025 | The New Eves | Singles 'Red Brick' & 'Whale Station' | Production & Mix |
| 2025 | Sally Potter | Album ANATOMY | Mix |
| 2025 | Depeche Mode | Concert film and album Depeche Mode: M | Mix |
| 2025 | Austra | Album Chip Up Buttercup | Mix |
| 2025 | Westerman | Album A Jackal’s Wedding | Production & Mix |
| 2025 | bar italia | Album Some Like It Hot | Mix |
| 2025 | Sorry | Tracks from album Cosplay | Mix |
| 2025 | Daphne Oram, Marta Salogni | Track ‘An Individual Note’ | Writing, Production & Mix |
| 2026 | Gorillaz | Album The Mountain | Mix |
| 2026 | Various artists / War Child Records | Tracks 'Flags', 'Strangers' & 'Universal Soldier' from album HELP(2) | Production & Mix |
| 2026 | Courtney Barnett | Tracks ‘Wonder’, ‘Mantis’, ’Same’, ‘Great Advice’ & ‘Another Beautiful Day’ from album Creature of Habit | Co-production |
| 2026 | KÁRYYN | Album PHYSICS UNIVERSAL LOVE LANGUAGE (PULL) | Mix |
| 2026 | Chelsea Wolfe | Singles ‘Death Is Not The End’ & ’The Dark’ | Mix |
| 2026 | Murex | Singles ‘Hardness Of A Silverspoon’ & ‘Massacre & 'Flock of swans fly in V’s' | Mix |
| 2026 | Chelsea Wolfe | Singles ‘Death Is Not The End’ & ’The Dark’ | Mix |
