= Narrator (disambiguation) =

A narrator is a person who tells a story to the audience.

Narrator may also refer to:

- Unreliable narrator, a narrator whose credibility is compromised
- The Narrator (Fight Club), the narrator of the 1996 novel Fight Club and its adaptations
- Narrator (The War of the Worlds), the narrator of the 1898 novel The War of the Worlds and its adaptations
- The Narrator (Pushing Daisies), the narrator of the ABC television series, Pushing Daisies
- The Narrator, the narrator of the PBS television series, WordGirl voiced by Chris Parnell
- "Narrator" (song), a song by British band, Squid
- Narrator (Windows), a screen reader in Microsoft Windows
