= Acts of Rebellion =

Studio album by Ela Minus
- Released: 23 October 2020
- Length: 33:48
- Label: Domino
- Producer: Ela Minus

Ela Minus chronology
Acts of Rebellion (2020)	Día (2025)

Singles from Acts of Rebellion
- 1. "They Told Us It Was Hard, but They Were Wrong" Released: 15 April 2020; 2. "Megapunk" Released: 30 July 2020

Acts of Rebellion (stylized in all lowercase) is the debut studio album by Colombian musician Ela Minus. It was released on 23 October 2020 through Domino Recording Company. It received universal acclaim from critics.

== Background ==
Eli Minus wrote, recorded, and produced Acts of Rebellion in her Brooklyn apartment. On the album, she sings the lyrics in both English and Spanish. The album includes the previously released songs: "They Told Us It Was Hard, but They Were Wrong" and "Megapunk". The album's final song "Close" features guest vocals from Helado Negro. The album's title is inspired by Chuck Palahniuk's novel Diary.

Music videos were released for the songs "They Told Us It Was Hard, but They Were Wrong", "Megapunk", "El cielo no es de nadie", "Dominique", and "N19 5NF".

== Critical reception ==
Professional ratings
Aggregate scores
Source	Rating
Metacritic	86/100
Review scores
Source	Rating
AllMusic	4/5 stars
Beats Per Minute	84%
The Guardian	4/5 stars
NME	5/5 stars
Paste	8.4/10
Pitchfork	7.2/10

According to the review aggregator Metacritic, Acts of Rebellion received "universal acclaim" based on a weighted average score of 86 out of 100 from 6 critic scores.

Heather Phares of AllMusic stated, "On every track, Minus gives listeners a clear sense of her worldview and balances all the elements of her music with an organic sophistication remarkable for a debut album." Aimee Cliff of The Guardian commented that "the record shares messages of self-love and resistance which, integrated in its DIY approach, punch through with real resonance." Max Freedman of Paste stated, "On her debut LP, Ela Minus explores the role of community in subverting both fascist governments and oppressive everyday expectations." He added, "It's a prophetic, vital message, and it's wrapped in some of the best electronic and pop music of the year." Chase McMullen of Beats Per Minute commented that "She preaches simplicity, reveling in the individual power within all of us, but the music layered and complex, full of bubbling and whirring elements behind every danceable beat."

The album was nominated for the Best Dance/Electronic Record award at the 2021 Libera Awards.

=== Accolades ===
Year-end lists for Acts of Rebellion
Publication	List	Rank	Ref.
Beats Per Minute	Top 50 Albums of 2020	42	
NME	The 50 Best Albums of 2020	36	
Paste	The 50 Best Albums of 2020	31	
Under the Radar	Top 100 Albums of 2020	99	

== Track listing ==
All tracks are written by Ela Minus.

Acts of Rebellion track listing
No.	Title	Length
1.	"N19 5NF"	2:05
2.	"They Told Us It Was Hard, but They Were Wrong"	6:00
3.	"El cielo no es de nadie"	4:21
4.	"Megapunk"	3:12
5.	"Pocket Piano"	2:12
6.	"Dominique"	3:54
7.	"Let Them Have the Internet"	1:54
8.	"Tony"	3:54
9.	"Do Whatever You Want, All the Time"	2:40
10.	"Close" (featuring Helado Negro)	3:36
Total length:		33:48

Notes

- All track titles are stylized in all lowercase, except for "N19 5NF".

== Personnel ==
Credits adapted from liner notes.

- Ela Minus – vocals, production, engineering
- Helado Negro – vocals (10)
- Marta Salogni – additional programming, mixing
- Heba Kadry – mastering
- Dr.Me – design, layout
- Teddy Fitzhugh – photography
