= The Twits (album) =

Studio album by Bar Italia
- Released: 3 November 2023
- Recorded: February–March or April 2023
- Studio: Bar Italia's home studio (Mallorca)
- Length: 47:16
- Label: Matador
- Producer: Bar Italia

Bar Italia chronology
Tracey Denim (2023)	The Twits (2023)

The Twits is the fourth studio album by British alternative rock band Bar Italia, released on 3 November 2023 through Matador Records. It is their second album of 2023, following Tracey Denim. The album received positive reviews from critics. The album title comes named after the Roald Dahl's book of the same name.

== Release ==
On 19 September 2023, Bar Italia announced the release of their fourth studio album, along with the first single "My Little Tony".

== Critical reception ==
Professional ratings
Aggregate scores
Source	Rating
Metacritic	75/100
Review scores
Source	Rating
AllMusic	4/5 stars
Clash	8/10
The Line of Best Fit	9/10
Mojo	3/5 stars
Pitchfork	6.9/10
The Skinny	3/5 stars

The Twits received a score of 75 out of 100 on review aggregator Metacritic based on twelve critics' reviews, indicating "generally favorable" reception. Mojo stated that "a queasy heat seeps into the Sonic Youth hiss and clang of My Little Tony, Jelsy's Bad Seeds metallic thrum and Shoo's slow, high plains drift". Reviewing the album for Clash, Sam Eeckhout found there to be a "profoundly plentiful amount of ideas bouncing around on The Twits, from the uptempo 'straight-ahead' rock songs to eerie-country to the slanted and driving post-punk rhythms powering songs like 'World's Greatest Emoter'".

Skye Butchard of The Skinny wrote that "a few more spins reveal a rare and exciting dynamic between the three members" as "they trade verses, taking songs in new directions, revelling in the tension where their individual ideas intersect". She felt that "the album works in short bursts of adrenaline", which "can leave midtempo ballads like Shoo feeling aimless". The Line of Best Fit's Joshua Mills opined that the band have "thicken[ed] the sound since May's Tracey Denim", which "has paid dividends for The Twits, an album of great texture and detail" as well as "creativity and invention". Samuel Hyland of Pitchfork called it "an attempt to expand on a tried-and-true formula. It's bookish, looking-out-the-window music: foot-tappy and slightly unnerving, best consumed through faulty earbuds you have to hold at precisely the right angle to operate".

== Track listing ==
All tracks are written by Nina Cristante, Jezmi Fehmi, and Sam Fenton.

The Twits track listing
No.	Title	Length
1.	"My Little Tony"	2:59
2.	"Real House Wibes (Desperate House Vibes)"	3:37
3.	"Twist"	4:29
4.	"Worlds Greatest Emoter"	2:54
5.	"Calm Down with Me"	3:21
6.	"Shoo"	4:25
7.	"Que Surprise"	3:13
8.	"Hi Fiver"	3:54
9.	"Brush w Faith"	3:46
10.	"Glory Hunter"	3:38
11.	"Sounds Like You Had to Be There"	3:13
12.	"Jelsy"	3:48
13.	"Bibs"	3:59
Total length:		47:16

== Personnel ==
Bar Italia

- Nina Cristante – production, engineering
- Jezmi Fehmi – production, engineering
- Samuel Fenton – production, engineering

Additional contributors

- Matt Colton – mastering
- Marta Salogni – mixing

== Charts ==
Chart performance for The Twits
Chart (2023)	Peak position
UK Independent Albums (Official Charts)	15
