= Narrator (song) =

Song by the British band Squid

Single by Squid

from the album Bright Green Field
- Released: January 27, 2021
- Recorded: 2020
- Studio: Mr. Dan's Studio (London)
- Genre: Post-punk; art rock
- Length: 8:29
- Label: Warp
- Songwriters: Louis Borlase; Ollie Judge; Arthur Leadbetter; Laurie Nankivell; Anton Pearson
- Producer: Dan Carey

Squid singles chronology
"Broadcaster" (2020)	"Narrator" (2021)	"Paddling" (2021)

"Narrator" is a song by British post-punk band Squid. It is the first single from their debut album, Bright Green Field. The song was released on January 27, 2021, under Warp. It features vocals from Martha Skye Murphy. Narrator is eight minutes long and was released along with an edited version. The song is a buildup, initially beginning calm. By the end, there is a "scream-ridden finale" with "shrieking instrumentals".

== Background ==
"Narrator" was inspired by a 2019 film, Long Day's Journey Into Night. The lyrics of the song describe a man who is unable to distinguish dreams from reality. Because of this, he becomes his own narrator. Squid said this about the song in a press release:

"The song follows a man who is losing the distinction between memory, dream, and reality, and how you can often mold your memories of people to fit a narrative that benefits your ego."

Martha Skye Murphy takes the role of the "woman wanting to break free" from the "dominating story the male has set". This is based on the band's idea that unreliable male narrators "portray women as submissive characters in their story".

== Track listing ==
All tracks are written by Squid, Martha Skye Murphy.

Narrator
No.	Title	Length
1.	"Narrator"	8:29
2.	"Narrator" (Edit)	4:31
Total length:		13:00
