= Town Centre (EP) =

2019 EP

EP by Squid
- Released: 9 September 2019
- Genre: Post-punk; indie rock; post-rock
- Length: 23:03
- Label: Speedy Wunderground
- Producer: Dan Carey

Squid chronology
Houseplants (2019)	Town Centre (2019)	Sludge (2020)

Singles from Town Centre
- 1. "The Cleaner" Released: 15 July 2019; 2. "Match Bet" Released: 29 August 2019

Town Centre is the second EP from British band Squid. The EP was released on 6 September 2019 through Speedy Wunderground. It marked the band's last release before signing to Warp Records. Critics responded positively to the EP. Town Centre was promoted with two singles; "The Cleaner", released on 15 July, and "Match Bet", released on 29 August.

== Background ==
Squid is a band made up of Ollie Judge, Louis Borlase, Arthur Leadbetter, Laurie Nankivell and Anton Pearson. Their first release was released on Bandcamp in 2016, titled Perfect Teeth. Their "atmospheric" debut EP, Lino, would release in 2017. They would release a new single, "The Dial" in 2018, before moving to London to work on Town Centre.

== Music and lyrics ==
Town Centre has been described as post-punk, indie rock and post-rock. Critics noted the EP borrowed influences from bands such as Talking Heads, ESG, and LCD Soundsystem. Opener "Savage" is a "slow, winding" intro track with "tell-tale brass". One critic noted its similarities to and Talk Talk's Spirit of Eden. "Match Bet" is a "hurtling indie rock tune" which "builds over a throttling motorik beat with intricate guitar work". Vocalist and drummer Ollie Judge said the track takes place in the same universe as "The Cleaner", with the song being told from the perspective of "a Sonic Youth super fan living with mental illness".

"The Cleaner" is a "jittery seven-minute duet between Judge and [Louis] Borlase". The band said the song is about "a lost acquaintance, one that we've spent the last year trying to get to know... tirelessly working and turning up whenever needed". Closer "Rodeo" is a "freeform, languid" outro with made up of a "morass of Neu! ambience, shuddering cello, and elliptical spoken-word".

== Release ==
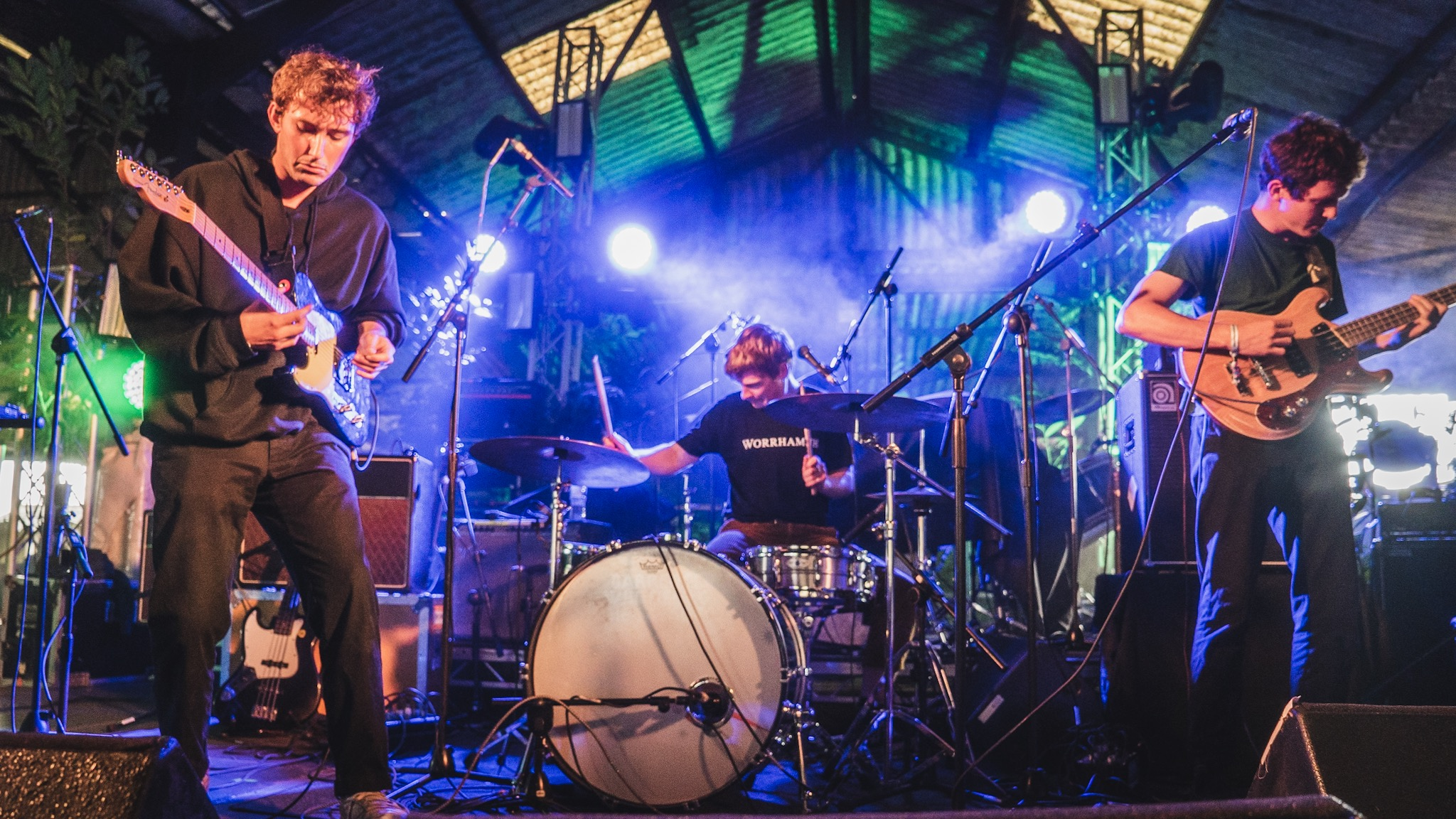
Squid in 2019

The first single, "The Cleaner", was released on 15 July 2019. The release of the single came the same day as the album's announcement. The second single, "Match Bet", was released on 29 August 2019.

Town Centre was released on 6 September 2019 through Speedy Wunderground. The EP marked the band's last release before signing to Warp Records in 2020. The band would go on to release two non-album singles, "Sludge" and "Broadcaster" in 2020 and their debut album, Bright Green Field in 2021 under Warp.

== Reception ==
Professional ratings
Review scores
Source	Rating
DIY	4.5/5 stars
NME	4/5 stars
Pitchfork	7.7/10

Town Centre received positive reviews from critics. Reviewing the EP for DIY, James Bentley called it a "richly musical and completely addictive listen" that showed why the band were "one of the most exciting bands in the country at this moment". Will Richards of NME said the EP "pushes Squid forwards with yet more evidence of what a fascinating young band they are" and called the EP "excellent". Writing for Pitchfork, Jazz Monroe said the EP "sounds like a declaration of limitlessness".

== Track listing ==
Town Centre track listing
No.	Title	Length
1.	"Savage"	4:58
2.	"Match Bet"	4:18
3.	"The Cleaner"	7:33
4.	"Rodeo"	6:13
Total length:		23:03

== Personnel ==
Credits adapted from liner notes.

- Squid – music, writing
- Michael Cox – painting
- Annelise Keestra – design
- Dan Carey – production, mixing
- Alexis Smith – engineering
- Jason Mitchell – mastering
