= Halo on the Inside =

Studio album by Circuit des Yeux
- Released: March 14, 2025
- Length: 40:46
- Label: Matador
- Producer: Andrew Broder; Haley Fohr

Circuit des Yeux chronology
| -io (2021) | Halo on the Inside (2025) |

Singles from Halo on the Inside
- 1. "Megaloner" Released: January 22, 2025; 2. "Canopy of Eden" Released: February 12, 2025; 3. "Truth" Released: March 11, 2025

Halo on the Inside is the seventh studio album by American vocalist Haley Fohr, under the stage name Circuit des Yeux. It was released on March 14, 2025, by Matador Records.

== Background ==
Consisting of nine songs, Halo on the Inside centers on the themes of Greek mythology, rebirth and self-embracing. "Megaloner", the first single, was released on January 22, 2025, and the second single, "Canopy of Eden" was released on February 12, 2025. The music video for "Megaloner" was directed by Dana Trippe. The album's third and final single "Truth" was released on March 11, 2025, with a music video directed by Cuan Roche. The album, incorporating the use of synths and electronics, was produced by Andrew Broder and Fohr.

== Reception ==
AllMusic's Paul Simpson reviewed the album and stated "Both introspective and commanding, Halo on the Inside charts a path between the club and the cosmos." London-based online music magazine MusicOMH described it as a "harsh, often claustrophobic record that draws you into the emotional whirlpool of its sound and won’t let you go," giving it a rating of five stars out of five. Pitchfork remarked "As Halo on the Inside gestures at eldritch change, it neither soothes nor shows the light. It instead becomes an enveloping cocoon of helplessness, with only Fohr’s voice cutting through to serve as a guide." British pop culture magazine The Quietus wrote "Halo on the Inside is an album that could only be made well into an established career, by an artist given the time to explore and the budget to pull off their lofty ambition." Paste Magazine's Devon Chodzin called the album "a bold, nocturnal take on the folksy experimentalism that has become the project’s modus operandi." Writing for PopMatters, John Amen commented that "[Fohr's] work, including her singular voice, conjures the grand epics, the metamorphoses that the ancients whispered and sang about". He concluded, "Fohr is grounded in timeless magic, functioning as a modern-day alchemist."

Professional ratings
Review scores
| Source | Rating |
|---|---|
| AllMusic | 4/5 stars |
| MusicOMH | 5/5 stars |
| Pitchfork | 7.7/10 |
| Paste | 8.5/10 |
| PopMatters | 8/10 |

== Track listing ==
All lyrics are written by Haley Fohr; all music is composed by Fohr and Andrew Broder, except "Anthem of Me" with music composed by Fohr.

| No. | Title | Length |
|---|---|---|
| 1. | "Megaloner" | 4:14 |
| 2. | "Canopy of Eden" | 4:58 |
| 3. | "Skeleton Key" | 6:02 |
| 4. | "Anthem of Me" | 4:42 |
| 5. | "Cosmic Joke" | 2:38 |
| 6. | "Cathexis" | 3:41 |
| 7. | "Truth" | 5:06 |
| 8. | "Organ Bed" | 4:24 |
| 9. | "It Takes My Pain Away" | 5:01 |

== Personnel ==
- Haley Fohr – vocals, production (all tracks); electric guitar (track 3), synthesizer (7)
- Andrew Border – production, piano, programming
- Heba Kadry – mastering
- Marta Salogni – mixing
- Nat Harvie – engineering
- Nick Broste – engineering
- Tom Herbers – engineering
- Melvin Gibbs – bass guitar (tracks 2, 3, 6, 7)
- David Tulles – percussion (tracks 2, 3, 7, 8)
- Cole Pulice – saxophone (tracks 2, 8, 9)
- Alistair Sung – cello (tracks 3, 6)
- Jason Stein – bass clarinet (track 3)
- Alan Sparhawk – electric guitar (track 3)
- Mayah Kadish – violin (track 3)
- Ashley Guerrero – drums (track 4), percussion (7)
- J. R. Bohannon – guitar (track 6)
- Whitney Johnson – viola (track 6)
- Lee Ranaldo – vocals (track 6)
- SemiraTruth – vocals (track 7)
- Alison Chesley – cello (track 9)

== Charts ==
Chart performance for Halo on the Inside
| Chart (2025) | Peak position |
|---|---|
| UK Album Downloads (OCC) | 78 |
| UK Independent Albums (OCC) | 40 |
