= Anatomy (Sally Potter album) =

Studio album by Sally Potter
- Released: 2 May 2025
- Length: 45:40
- Label: Bella Union
- Producer: Sally Potter; Marta Salogni

Sally Potter chronology
Pink Bikini (2023)	Anatomy (2025)

Singles from Anatomy
- 1. "Coming Home" Released: 12 February 2025

Anatomy is the second studio album by English film director and screenwriter Sally Potter. It was released on 2 May 2025, by Bella Union.

== Background ==
Anatomy, preceded by Potter's debut album in 2023, Pink Bikini, features a total runtime of approximately forty-five minutes. The opening title track is performed with the guitar, violin, and piano, while "Carmageddon" incorporates elements of garage rock and blues. Potter described the theme of the album as "what we are doing to the earth." The album's lead single is "Coming Home", released on 12 February 2025.

== Reception ==
Professional ratings
Review scores
Source	Rating
AllMusic	4/5 stars
Clash	7/10
Uncut	7/10 stars

Terry Staunton of Uncut rated the album seven out of ten and described it as encompassing "poetical ruminations largely accompanied by sparse piano and string quartet." Clash's Nick Roseblade also rated the album seven out of ten, describing it as "powerful" and "an album that reminds up not to keep things held inside." Thom Jurek of AllMusic referred to Anatomy as "masterful" and noted it as "perfectly paced, gorgeously orchestrated and produced."

== Track listing ==
All tracks are written by Sally Potter.

Anatomy track listing
No.	Title	Length
1.	"Anatomy"	3:02
2.	"Coming Home"	4:18
3.	"Words"	4:55
4.	"My Earth"	4:14
5.	"Carmageddon"	1:53
6.	"Walk Away"	2:29
7.	"Time to Go"	2:12
8.	"Come Back"	5:39
9.	"Honey"	3:01
10.	"Oh Daughter"	2:44
11.	"Elegy"	5:02
12.	"The Fall"	6:11
Total length:		45:40

== Personnel ==
Credits adapted from Tidal.

- Sally Potter – vocals, production
- Marta Salogni – production
- Kieran Leonard – bodhran
- Matthew Barley – cello
- Dave Brown – double bass
- Gwen Reed – double bass
- Toby Hughes – double bass
- Valentina Magaletti – drums
- Ben Reed – electric bass
- Paul Cott – French horn
- Phillippa Koush-Jalali – French horn
- Richard Bayliss – French horn
- Fred Frith – guitar
- Liam Dunachie – piano
- David Geoghegan – trumpet
- Sasha Koushk Jalali – tuba
- Misha Mullov-Abbado – upright bass
- Viktoria Mullova – violin
