= O Monolith =

Studio album by Squid
- Released: 9 June 2023
- Studio: Real World, England
- Genre: Post-punk, art punk
- Length: 41:00
- Label: Warp
- Producer: Dan Carey

Squid chronology
Bright Green Field (2021)	O Monolith (2023)	Cowards (2025)

Singles from O Monolith
- 1. "Swing (In a Dream)" Released: 8 February 2023; 2. "Undergrowth" Released: 18 April 2023; 3. "The Blades" Released: 25 May 2023

O Monolith is the second studio album by British band Squid, released on 9 June 2023 on Warp Records. Produced by Dan Carey, the album was preceded by three singles: "Swing (In a Dream)", "Undergrowth" and "The Blades".

Written and recorded in rural Wiltshire, the band described the album as a "musical evocation of environment, domesticity and self-made folklore". Several of the album's eight tracks were debuted and workshopped in front of live audiences while touring in support of their debut album, Bright Green Field.

== Background ==
Within two weeks of the release of Squid's debut studio album, Bright Green Field, the band began writing new material for its follow-up, using their 2021 tour in support of the album to improvise and "workshop" ideas for O Monolith's eight tracks. The bulk of the album's material was written in rural Wiltshire, at the Writing Room in Peter Gabriel's Real World Studios, the recording studio complex at which the band ultimately recorded the album.

Lead vocalist and drummer Ollie Judge stated that he was trying to make a "spiritual" record despite his "inherent cynicism". Prior to landing on the title, O Monolith, the album had the working title of Moonrakers. Regarding the album's eventual title, the band noted: "We're leaving it open to interpretation. We don't know why it's called that... yet. We were keen for things surrounding this album not to make too much sense. We were quite attracted to the way that the word monolith does that; it can have ancient and modern connotations quite easily."

Musically, the band were influenced by These New Puritans, Talk Talk, and Gazelle Twin and NYX's 2021 album, Deep England.

== Recording ==
O Monolith was recorded at Peter Gabriel's Real World Studios, with Dan Carey; Carey had previously produced the band's debut album, Bright Green Field. The band praised the scale, size and location of Real World Studios, which is based in rural Wiltshire: "Just being in a space where you can see the countryside from the big windows was huge. Naturally when playing acoustic instruments with the choir and orchestral components, being in that space allows for it to feel like the music is singing back to you to a certain extent, and you also have some space to write things individually and having another room to work on different pieces was brilliant too."

Regarding the differences between recording at Real World and Dan Carey's home studio, the band noted: "It's, er, very different! Real World is a James Bond baddie base from which Peter Gabriel is planning on taking over the world. Dan's studio is an old Post Office room in south London."

== Writing and composition ==
The album's opening track and first single, "Swing (In a Dream)", is "inspired by a nocturnal vision" of the painting The Swing by Jean-Honoré Fragonard. "Devil's Den" is named after The Devil's Den, a local burial chamber in Wiltshire that is said to be visited by demons in the night. The song is also in part influenced by ancient witch trials: "There's a feminist play called Vinegar Tom written by Caryl Churchill in the 70s, which I thought was interesting. And then I decided to load the song with as much supernatural imagery as possible."

The lyrics to "Undergrowth" were inspired by lead vocalist and drummer Ollie Judge's insular experiences during COVID-19 lockdowns: "I developed this obsession with animism. I was going for weeks without seeing anyone walking past my window. I was just looking out at things that hadn't moved in weeks, like the bins and found myself wondering if there were spirits living in them. Then I started having these thoughts all the time: 'What if I die, what will I come back as? Maybe I'll come back as furniture... I was going pretty crazy and had to get out to talk to other people. I got a job at the Rough Trade warehouse, doing mail order, simply so I could interact with other people a few times a week. Yeah, "Undergrowth" is about dying really."

"The Blades" references police brutality, which inspired the "Kill the Bill" protests in Bristol in 2021. Guitarist, vocalist and multi-instrumentalist Anton Pearson wrote the lyrics to the album's final track, "If You Had Seen the Bull's Swimming Attempts You Would Have Stayed Away", about a fictionalised account of rats arriving in the United Kingdom alongside Roman colonisers: "We know that when the Romans came here it led to the destruction of some languages in different places, so I wrote a story about rats rubbing out dictionaries. But it was also inspired by Theo Anthony's documentary Rat Film about the red-lining of different urban populations in America and how poverty relates to rodent populations."

== Critical reception ==
Professional ratings
Aggregate scores
Source	Rating
AnyDecentMusic?	7.9/10
Metacritic	82/100
Review scores
Source	Rating
AllMusic	4/5 stars
Clash	8/10
DIY	4.5/5 stars
The Line of Best Fit	9/10
MusicOMH	4/5 stars
NME	4/5 stars
Pitchfork	7.3/10
PopMatters	7/10
The Skinny	4/5 stars
Under the Radar	7/10

O Monolith received a score of 82 out of 100 on review aggregator Metacritic based on 14 critics' reviews, indicating "universal acclaim". Ryan Leas of Pitchfork wrote that Squid's "core sound remains, with flares of distortion and full-throated freakouts erupting from wiry rhythms" and "for a band that has always been adventurous, Squid now seek a different kind of freedom: They no longer surge forward, but wander". Leas also felt that the album's subject matter is "characteristically dense and far-flung". Rob Moura of PopMatters called it "a tighter, leaner, more refined version of what predecessor Bright Green Field brought to the table [...] with quiet parts building into loud parts that then drop back into gulfs of atmosphere". Moura also felt that it is "hard to be unpredictable for long, and for a group that benefits from unpredictability, O Monolith can't help but suffer from the weight of expectations".

Reviewing the album for AllMusic, Timothy Monger described O Monolith as "a more streamlined, though still Squid-like sophomore set that nurtures their innate curiosity while still feeding their appetite for chaos", and found that the "most immediate shift in their sound is an increased emphasis on melody and harmonic structure". Robin Murray of Clash felt that the album "is less of a second chapter, and more of a completely distinct book", one that "allows Squid to truly inter-connect, the band's inherently democratic means of music-making storming across eight vivid tracks". Murray also remarked that producer Carey "once more coaxes out some feral performances from the band", concluding that it is "no less inviting than their debut, while asserting its own identity at every corner".

Max Pilley of NME commented that Squid's "hungry curiosity, combined with a desire to push their own boundaries, comes to fruition on O Monolith to create an album that is ripe for discovery across multiple listens", finding that "there is now patience and a sense of self-confidence that allows Squid to develop their ideas across time and space". Elvis Thirlwell of DIY pointed out the album's "otherworldly folk cultishness, with group chants and woodwind figures adding pastoral flair", concluding that it "retains that signature post-punk flex – guitars interlocking in askew time signatures" and is "an album of immense power and conviction".

Jo Higgs of The Skinny described O Monolith as "a torn-up patchwork of terrain; scorching sands sutured violently into haunting forestry, sprawling ocean scapes tidally enveloping dense metropolitan high-rises", highlighting the final track as "most worthy of being considered monolithic in its own right" due to the fact it "provides three distinct sonic variations in its first minute alone, and does not rest on its laurels from thereon out. It encapsulates O Monolith, and elevates it". Writing for musicOMH, Ross Horton opined that the album "showcases a band capable of creating a unique fusion of old and new(ish)" and "finds them delving even deeper into denser and more whimsical themes". Horton highlighted "Siphon Song" as a "skilful manipulation of dynamics [that] creates a thrilling and unpredictable sonic journey, further cementing the album's prowess".

John Amen of The Line of Best Fit summarised the album as "triumphant on its own terms" and "stylistically far-ranging" yet "less radically individual than Field, a still distinct yet replicable template from a band with enormous potential". Ben Jardine of Under the Radar found O Monolith to be "vast, and it both benefits and suffers from this vastness. While it has plenty of memorable moments, paired with an unfettered desire to explore and innovate in the studio, it lacks the immediate throughline of its successor. It's still Squid at their most experimental, but it has more bark than bite".

== Track listing ==
O Monolith track listing
No.	Title	Length
1.	"Swing (In a Dream)"	4:29
2.	"Devil's Den"	3:05
3.	"Siphon Song"	5:58
4.	"Undergrowth"	6:35
5.	"The Blades"	6:28
6.	"After the Flash"	5:34
7.	"Green Light"	4:23
8.	"If You Had Seen the Bull's Swimming Attempts You Would Have Stayed Away"	5:14
Total length:		41:00

== Charts ==
Chart performance for O Monolith
Chart (2023)	Peak position
Belgian Albums (Ultratop Flanders)	78
German Albums (Offizielle Top 100)	99
Scottish Albums (OCC)	13
UK Albums (OCC)	34
UK Independent Albums (OCC)	6
