= Narrator (The War of the Worlds) =

Fictional character

The narrator
- The War of the Worlds character
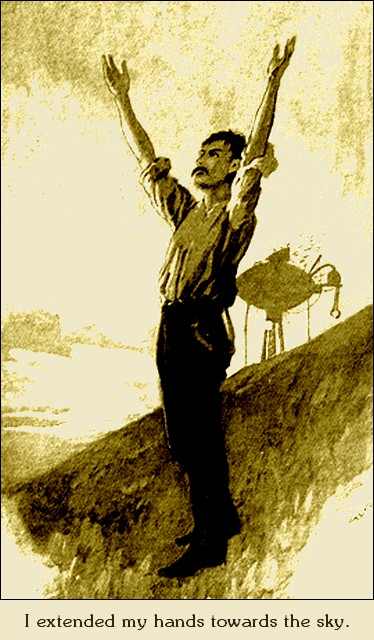
- The narrator, as illustrated by Warwick Goble
- First appearance: The War of the Worlds
- Created by: H. G. Wells

In-universe information
- Aliases: The Journalist (Jeff Wayne's Musical Version of The War of the Worlds); The Writer (H. G. Wells' The War of the Worlds (Pendragon Pictures film)); Walter Jenkins (The Massacre of Mankind)
- Gender: Male
- Occupation: Writer
- Family: The narrator's wife The narrator's cousin
- Nationality: British

The narrator is the unnamed protagonist of the 1898 science fiction novel The War of the Worlds by H. G. Wells. He is said to be a writer of "professed and recognized writer on philosophical themes," and finds himself in the midst of the Martian invasion due to living near Horsell Common, where the first Martian cylinder lands.

There have been various academic interpretations of the character; Wells scholar Patrick Parrinder considers the narrator a foil to the Victorian hero, a trope popular at the time of the novel's release. Critics like John Reider and Robert Crossley have frequently interpreted the narrator as a way to push an anti-imperialist interpretation.

== Biography ==
The Narrator describes himself as "professed and recognized writer on philosophical themes." He lives in a house on Putney Hill, Woking, Surrey, England, near Horsell Common, where the first cylinder lands. After the Martians emerge and prove to be hostile, he flees with his wife to Leatherhead with the intention of staying with extended family, asking the landlord of the local pub to borrow a dogcart and a horse to carry supplies. When he reaches Leatherhead, he decides to return the dogcart to the landlord, leaving his wife with his cousin. While heading back to Woking, the Narrator encounters a fighting machine for the first time and, in panic, crashes the dogcart, killing the horse. He leaves the dogcart behind, fleeing for his house. He meets an Artilleryman, seeking shelter after the Martians annihilated Army units deployed to Horsell Common. Venturing out the next morning, they are separated by a Martian attack on Weybridge and Shepperton.

After surviving the battle, the Narrator encounters a traumatised Curate in Walton. The two move towards London, sheltering in abandoned houses in the countryside as they go. From the shelter of one house, they witness the Martians deploy the "Black Smoke", a chemical weapon used to smother possible ambush points. Moving on to try to avoid discovery, the pair become trapped after a cylinder lands on the house they are hiding in, in the village of Sheen.

From the wreckage of the house, the two are able to observe the Martians at close quarters, including the assembly of a handling machine and autonomous embankment machine, and the Martians using humans as a source of food. After two weeks of rationing the food in the house, the Curate suffers a nervous breakdown and begins yelling, revealing their position to the Martians. The panicked narrator tries to silence the Curate by knocking him unconscious, but the noise has already attracted a handling machine. The narrator manages to hide in the house's coal cellar, but the Martian takes the Curate and all the remaining food. After remaining hidden with no food and little water for several more days, the narrator eventually emerges to find that the Martians have abandoned the cylinder.

Walking towards London, in the hope of finding transport back to Leatherhead, he meets the Artilleryman again at Putney Hill. The Artilleryman boasts about his plan to create an underground society that will eventually rise against the Martians, and the rest of the day the two men work on a tunnel he is digging under a well-to-do house towards the sewer system. However, it is clear that the man's ambition outstrips his ability and, when the Artilleryman falls asleep after drinking most of a bottle of champagne, the narrator leaves and heads into London in search of other survivors and, hopefully, transport.

The Narrator finds a city largely empty of people, occasionally finding areas where the Martians have used their Black Smoke or heat-ray. Most of the humans he encounters are already dead, but he finds at least one living man, insensibly drunk. As he ventures further east, the Narrator becomes aware of a droning mechanical wail he describes as "ulla" coming from the direction of Primrose Hill and begins following it in a sort of trance. As night descends, he discovers that the sound is coming from one of three fighting machines standing on Primrose Hill, completely motionless. He comes across an overturned handling machine, unable to tell in the darkness that its Martian pilot is dead and partially eaten by stray dogs.

The call abruptly cuts off as the Narrator approaches Primrose Hill. He spends the remainder of the night in a cabman's shelter on the roadside, finding the Martian machines still in place as the sun rises. Feeling "an insane resolve" come over himself, the Narrator decides to end his life and storms towards the Martians, trying to attract their attention so that they will fire on him and save him the trouble of taking his own life. As he gets closer, he notices that flocks of crows have gathered around the fighting machines, pecking and tearing at shreds of bloody flesh that are hanging from the cockpits. He realises that the Martians are all dead and suffers a breakdown himself, later being found by other survivors in a delirious state, wandering the streets and yelling about being "the last man alive".

The Narrator is taken in by a family of survivors and rests for several days, learning that the Martians destroyed Leatherhead while he and the Curate were trapped under the fallen house. Heartbroken, he travels back to Woking once the railways are running again. The Narrator goes to his house on Maybury Hill, finding it much as he left it, but encountering his wife and cousin that had managed to flee Leatherhead before the town was destroyed.

== Adaptations and unofficial sequels ==
The narrator is not typically adapted in adaptations of The War of the Worlds; however, there are a few minor exceptions.

=== Jeff Wayne's Musical Version of The War of the Worlds ===
In Jeff Wayne's Musical Version of The War of the Worlds, the narrator is renamed to The Journalist. He is a combination of the narrator as well as the narrator's brother; for he is there to witness the destruction of Thunder Child.

=== Pendragon Pictures film ===
Pendragon Pictures's version of the narrator is mostly the same, as the film is a direct adaptation of Wells' novel. He is directly referred to as "The Writer" in this version.

=== The Asylum film ===
In The Asylum film, the narrator is named George Herbert, in reference to H. G. Wells' initials. Herbert is an astronomer and doctor in this version, as opposed to a philosophical writer. The narrator also has two children in this version.

=== The Massacre of Mankind ===
In The Massacre of Mankind, the narrator is identified as Walter Jenkins, the writer of the in-universe Narrative, which is the first novel. He is one of the people who is notified of the second Martian invasion portrayed in the book; alongside famed historical figures Thomas Edison, Albert Einstein, and the author of the "Year Million Man,"––whom he takes as rival author. He is evaluated by then-upcoming psychatirist Sigmund Freud, who evaluates that Jenkins suffers from post-traumatic stress disorder.

Jenkins is also who creates the plan for the main character, Julia Elphinstone, to communicate with key military figures to change the Martian's conquering sigils to Jovian sigils, in order to allow the Jovians to see, from space, of the invasion. The Jovians push back the Martians in an implied telepathic manner; though Jenkins and Elphinstone speculate that the war is not yet over. As they approach the next Earth-Mars opposition, waiting as it strikes midnight––a historical sign of when the Martians will launch another wave of cylinders––Elphinstone and Jenkins wait in Jenkins' old home, Elphinstone having received incentive from Jenkin's wife (renamed Caroline in this version) to see if Jenkins is okay. At the end of the night, the Martians do not fire.

== Interpretations ==
=== As a universal symbol of the English everyman ===
And before we judge of them too harshly we must remember what ruthless and utter destruction our own species has wrought, not only upon animals, such as the vanished bison and the dodo, but upon its own inferior races. The Tasmanians, in spite of their human likeness, were entirely swept out of existence in a war of extermination waged by European immigrants, in the space of fifty years. Are we such apostles of mercy as to complain if the Martians warred in the same spirit?

— H. G. Wells

Critics have frequently interpreted the narrator's lack of name as a way for readers to transpose themselves onto him.

In his 2008 monograph Colonialism and the Emergence of Science Fiction, John Reider states that The War of the Worlds is "the experience of colonial subjugation brought home to the metropolitian readers," arguing that because the narrator is inherently void of any significant character traits, that he can be likened to the average middle class man in England. He states that the narrator's occupation as a philosophical thinker is used as a vehicle in the book that "inverts the structure of imperial ideology."

Robert Crossley stated in his book, Imagining Mars: A Literary History, that "Wells asks the English to imagine themselves as the victims of empire." [sic]

=== As a psychological case study ===
It is a curious thing that I felt angry with my wife; I cannot account for it, but my impotent desire to reach Leatherhead worried me excessively.

— H. G. Wells

Wells scholar Patrick Parrinder suggests that the book is "a confessional text written by a traumatised survivor who remains understandably demoralised and disoriented by his experiences."

Yoonjoung Choi and Richard Law discuss how the narrative is from two different perspectives; one of a rational philosopher writing from the future, and the other of an irrational man trying to survive. They suggest that these two perspectives are in constant clash with each other. After the curate dies, the narrator confesses that the death "gave me no sensation of horror or remorse to recall; I saw it simply as a thing done, a memory infinitely disagreeable but quite without the quality of remorse." Despite the fact that the narrator was safer with his wife in Leatherhead, he decides to charge back into the heat of the war. At the end of the book, finding his new reality hopeless, he charges head first into what he thinks are the Martians. His "war-fever" and desire to check out the Martians overrides the desire to find his wife to the point of self-destruction; making the text, as Choi writes, "the narrator's attempt at self justification. . .construed as the confession of his ambiguous morality."
