= Cowards (album) =

Studio album by Squid
- Released: 7 February 2025
- Genre: Post-rock; art rock
- Length: 44:59
- Label: Warp
- Producer: Marta Salogni; Grace Banks; Dan Carey

Squid chronology
O Monolith (2023)	Cowards (2025)

Singles from Cowards
- 1. "Crispy Skin" Released: 12 November 2024; 2. "Building 650" Released: 8 January 2025; 3. "Cro-Magnon Man" Released: 4 February 2025

Cowards is the third studio album by the English post-punk band Squid. It was released by Warp Records on 7 February 2025, and was met with widespread acclaim by music critics.

== Background ==
Cowards was recorded after the completion but before the release of the band's second album, O Monolith, with recording finishing on 9 June 2023. It was inspired by traveling to different countries and reading books about the countries to create what lead singer and drummer Ollie Judge described as a "book of dark fairy tales." Some of these books included Agustina Bazterrica's Tender Is the Flesh and Ryū Murakami's In the Miso Soup.

The lyrics touch on a variety of topics within the overall topic of "evil itself", with "Crispy Skin" being about cannibalism and "Blood on the Boulders" about the Manson murders.

== Composition ==
Cowards has been described as both post-rock and art rock, with influences from a diverse set of other genres, including electronica, folk music, and psych rock. The album was seen as a continuation of the band's distancing from their earlier post-punk sound. Writing for The Quietus, Cal Cashin described Cowards as "A Pet Sounds, except all of the pets are scorpions, and tarantulas, and maybe some stick insects too".

== Release and reception ==
Professional ratings
Aggregate scores
Source	Rating
AnyDecentMusic?	8.2/10
Metacritic	85/100
Review scores
Source	Rating
AllMusic	4/5 stars
Clash	8/10
DIY	4.5/5 stars
The Line of Best Fit	8/10
MusicOMH	4/5 stars
NME	4/5 stars
Paste	8.2/10
Pitchfork	7.6/10
The Skinny	5/5 stars
Under the Radar	9/10

Cowards was released by Warp Records on 7 February 2025. It follows Squid's 2023 album O Monolith.

According to the review aggregator Metacritic, Cowards received "universal acclaim" based on a weighted average score of 85 out of 100 from 17 critic scores. In a review for Paste, Alli Dempsey wrote that "Sonically, Cowards might be Squid's most actualized and in-depth venture yet." Writing for Under the Radar, Nick Roseblade felt that Cowards was "the strongest album Squid has released to date".

== Track listing ==
All tracks are written by Louis Borlase, Ollie Judge, Arthur Leadbetter, Laurie Nankivell, and Anton Pearson.

No.	Title	Length
1.	"Crispy Skin"	6:19
2.	"Building 650"	3:51
3.	"Blood on the Boulders"	5:46
4.	"Fieldworks I"	2:23
5.	"Fieldworks II"	3:19
6.	"Cro-Magnon Man"	4:07
7.	"Cowards"	5:51
8.	"Showtime!"	5:08
9.	"Well Met (Fingers Through the Fence)"	8:15
Total length:		44:59

== Personnel ==
=== Squid ===
- Louis Borlase – guitar, bass guitar, vocals
- Ollie Judge – drums, lead vocals
- Arthur Leadbetter – keyboards
- Laurie Nankivell – bass guitar, brass, percussion
- Anton Pearson – guitar, bass, vocals, percussion

=== Additional musicians ===
- Ruisi Quartet – strings (tracks 1–6, 8, 9)
  - Alessandro Ruisi – violin
  - Venetia Jollands – violin
  - Luba Tunnicliffe – viola
  - Max Ruisi – cello
- Zands Duggan – additional percussion (tracks 1–3, 5–9)
- Rosa Brook – additional voices (tracks 1, 3, 5, 7, 9)
- Tony Njoku – additional voices (tracks 1, 3, 5, 7, 9)
- Clarissa Connelly – additional voices (track 9)
- Chris Dowding – flugelhorn (tracks 7, 9)

=== Technical ===
- Marta Salogni – production, recording, additional engineering
- Grace Banks – engineering, additional production
- Dan Carey – additional production
- Heba Kadry – mastering
- John McEntire – mixing
- Chiara Ferracuti – additional engineering

=== Visuals ===
- Ben Sifel – design
- Tonje Tielsen – photography

== Charts ==
Chart performance for Cowards
Chart (2025)	Peak position
Belgian Albums (Ultratop Flanders)	172
Scottish Albums (OCC)	17
UK Albums (OCC)	92
UK Independent Albums (OCC)	5
