= Bar Italia (band) =

British indie rock band

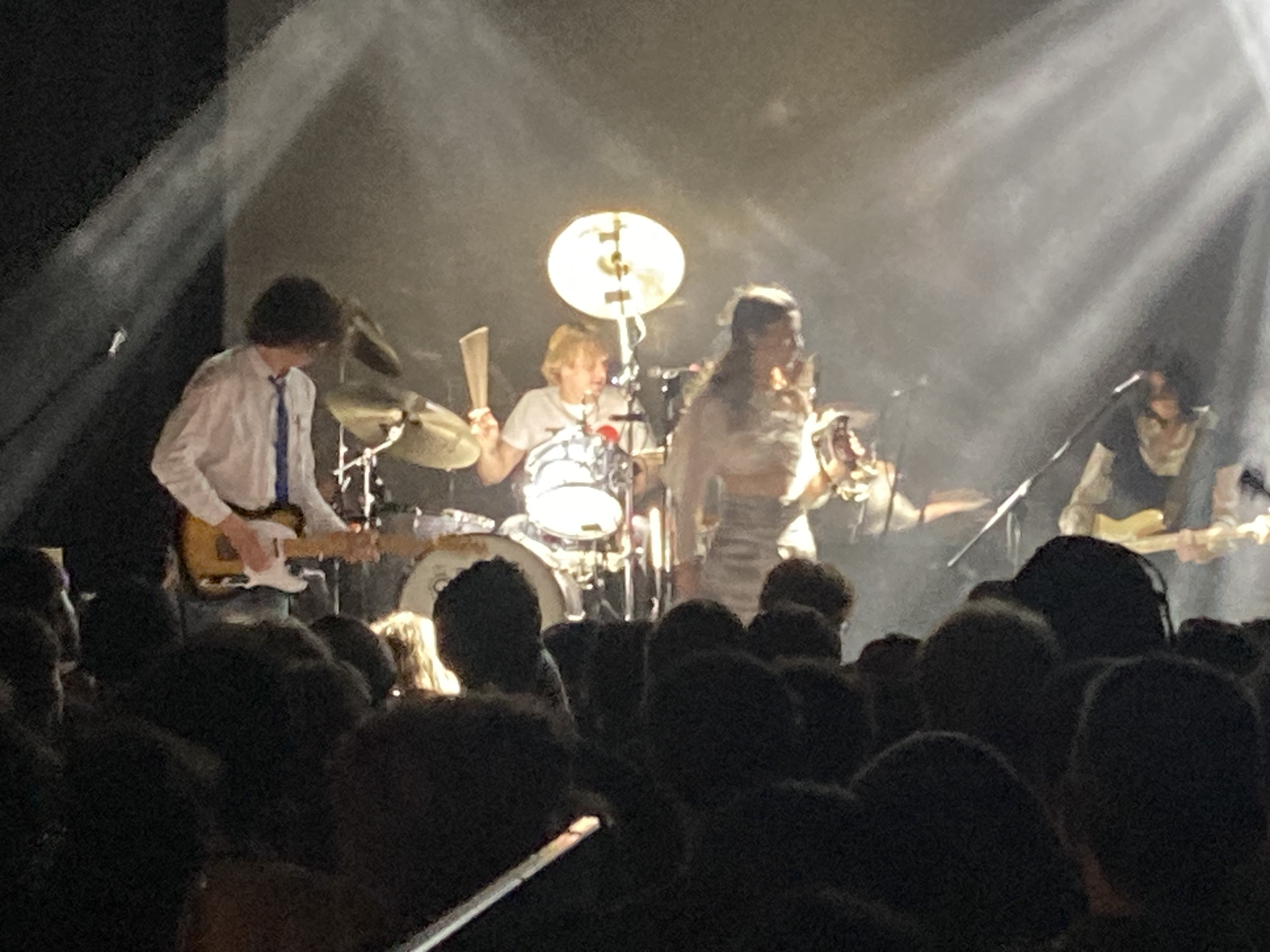

Background information
- Origin: London, England
- Genres: Indie rock; post-rock
- Years active: 2019–present
- Labels: World Music; Matador Records
- Members: Nina Cristante; Sam Fenton; Jezmi Tarik Fehmi
- Website: https://baritaliaa.com

Bar Italia (stylized in lowercase) are a British indie rock band formed in London in 2019. The band consists of members Nina Cristante (vocals), Sam Fenton (vocals, guitar), and Jezmi Tarik Fehmi (vocals, guitar). Their name is derived from the Soho café Bar Italia.

== Biography ==
The Italian-born Cristante grew up in Rome but moved to London in 2007. Fenton and Fehmi lived in a flat below Cristante in Peckham, where they met. In 2019, they began making music together. The band's sound is often associated with indie sleaze, shoegaze, and lo-fi pop influences.

From 2020 onwards, the band released five albums, three EPs and multiple singles through World Music, the record label founded by London musicians Dean Blunt and Inga Copeland.

They were noted as a "new act to watch" by The Face magazine and the number one "rising star to look out for in 2023" by The Times. Their 2022 EP CDR was placed at number one on Gorilla vs. Bear's list of the best EPs of 2022, and their track "Miracle Crush" was placed at number 13 on Crack's list of the 25 best songs of 2022.

In March 2023, it was announced they had signed with Matador Records. They released Tracey Denim in May 2023, while their second album of the year, The Twits, released in November and was supported by European and North American tour dates. Both albums received "generally favorable" reviews according to rating aggregator Metacritic, with French cultural magazine Les Inrocks placing the two projects collectively at number 10 in their list of the best albums of the year. AllMusic called The Twits a reflection of the group's growth "into an increasingly singular, expressive band", and the record debuted at No. 36 on the UK Albums Chart, the band's highest placement as of 2023.

In October 2025, Bar Italia released their album Some Like It Hot through Matador Records. The record, described as a culmination of the group’s collaborative songwriting, blends rock, folk pop and ballads, and follows their 2023 releases. Ahead of the album, the singles "Cowbella," "Fundraiser," "rooster," and "omni shambles" were issued, with Fundraiser accompanied by a video featuring actor Matt King. The band began a tour following the release of Some Like It Hot, playing at venues across Europe and North America, including a sold-out release show at The Dome in London.

== Other projects ==
Fehmi and Fenton also make music as a duo under the name Double Virgo, a reference to their shared astrological star sign. Since 2020, they have created a number of indie rock and shoegaze records together, produced by Vegyn and released via his label, PLZ Make It Ruins.

Nina Cristante has created lo-fi pop music under the alias Nina (stylized in all caps), often collaborating with producer and former label mate, Dean Blunt.

== Members ==
Current members

- Nina Cristante – vocals, percussion, piano, keyboards
- Sam Fenton – vocals, guitar
- Jezmi Tarik Fehmi – guitar, vocals

Current touring musicians

- Liam Toon – drums (2024–present)
- Mathilde Bataille – bass (2025–present)

== Discography ==
=== Studio albums ===
- Quarrel (World Music, 2020)
- Bedhead (World Music, 2021)
- Tracey Denim (Matador, 2023)
- The Twits (Matador, 2023)
- Some Like It Hot (Matador, 2025)

=== EPs ===
- Angelica Pilled (World Music, 2020)
- CDR (self-released, 2022)
- The Tw*ts (Matador, 2024)

=== Singles ===
List of singles, showing year released, album name and label
Title	Year	Album	Label
"Banks"	2022	CDR	World Music
"Miracle Crush"	2022	CDR	World Music
"Polly Armour"	2022	CDR	self-released
"Nurse!"	2023	Tracey Denim	Matador
"Punkt!"	2023	Tracey Denim	Matador
"Changer"	2023	Tracey Denim	Matador
"My Little Tony"	2023	The Twits	Matador
"Jelsy"	2023	The Twits	Matador
"World's Greatest Emoter"	2023	The Twits	Matador
"Cowbella"	2025	Some Like It Hot	Matador
"Fundraiser"	2025	Some Like It Hot	Matador

== Awards and nominations ==
Year	Award	Category	Nominated work	Result	Ref.
2024	Libera Awards	Breakthrough Artist	N/A	Nominated	
