= Ela Minus =

Colombian singer-songwriter and producer

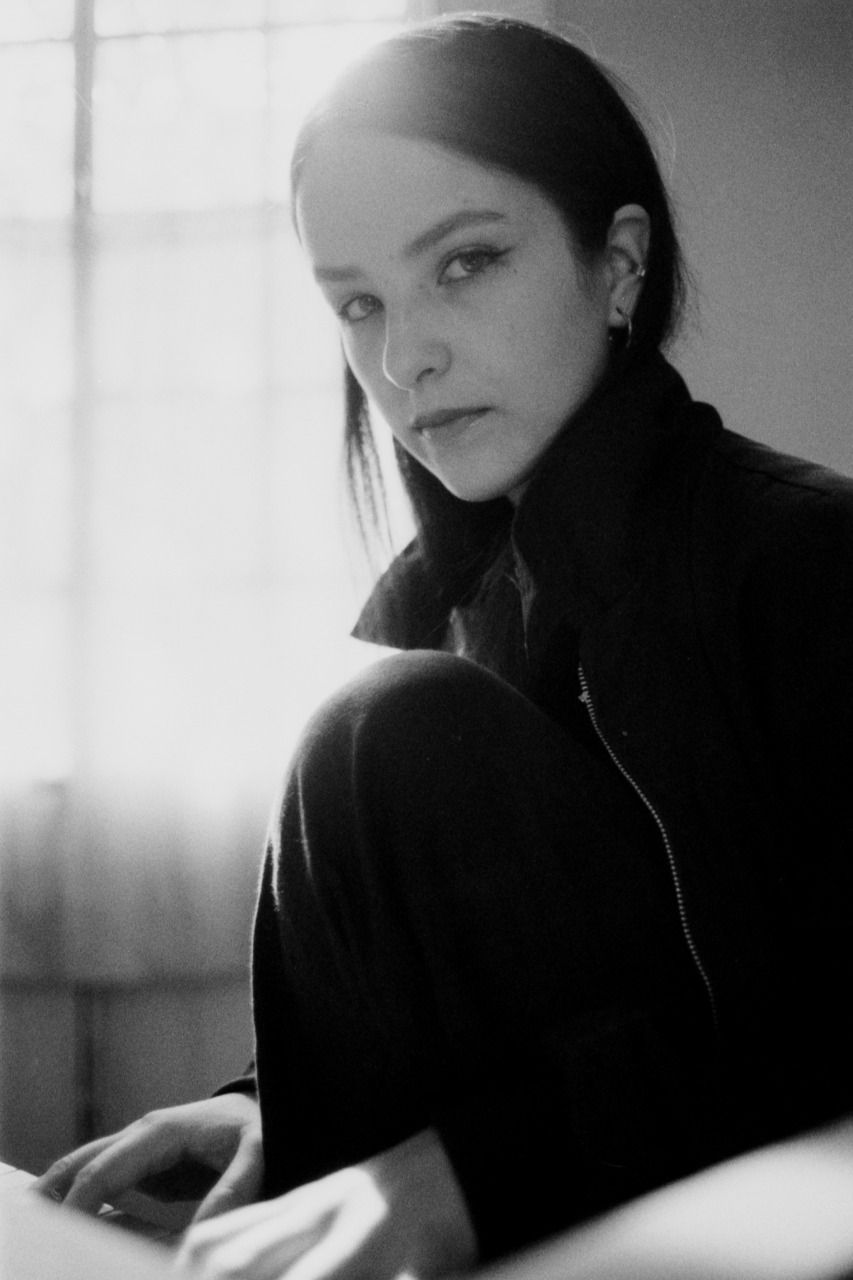
- Ela Minus in Mexico, 2021

Background information
- Also known as: Gabriela Jimeno
- Born: Gabriela Jimeno Caldas; 11 February 1990 (age 36); Bogotá, Colombia
- Genres: Electronic; dance pop
- Occupations: Singer-songwriter; record producer
- Years active: 2015–present
- Label: Domino
- Formerly of: Ratón Perez
- Website: elaminus.com

Gabriela Jimeno Caldas (born 11 February 1990), professionally known as Ela Minus, is a Colombian singer-songwriter, multi-instrumentalist, and producer.

== Biography ==
=== Early life and education ===
Jimeno was born in the city of Bogotá. From the age of 11 to 18, she was a drummer for Ratón Perez, a local hardcore rock band that toured Colombia. Her stint as a drummer allowed Caldas to gain considerable recognition in the national independent music scene.

Jimeno left Colombia at the age of 19 for the United States to attend the Berklee College of Music in Boston. Moved by the city's nightclub scene, she shifted to electronic music, double majoring in jazz drumming and music synthesis. She continued playing for bands during her studies, and after graduating, she worked on building and designing synthesizers at Critter & Guitari in New York.

=== Career ===
Before she began her solo career under the name Ela Minus, Jimeno-Caldas was a prominent drummer for her own projects, playing for bands Balancer and Ratón Perez, and as a hired musician in studio and on tour. She accompanied bands like Austra and Dams of the West as a drummer on a number of tours.

In 2015, Jimeno released her first song as a solo artist titled "Jamaica" under the moniker of Ela Minus, an alter ego in which Jimeno writes, records and produces everything herself. The project differentiated itself immediately by the motto of only using analog synthesizers and producing outside of the computer, using computers solely to record audio. Unlike other electronic music acts, Minus started by only playing live shows, refusing to DJ; she quickly gained recognition by playing clubs and festivals around the world exclusively as a live electronic act, with only analog gear with her on stage.

From 2015 onwards, Jimeno released a number of extended plays independently. In 2019, she signed with Domino Recording Company, becoming the first Latin American artist to be signed to the label. On 23 October 2020, Jimeno released her debut studio album, Acts of Rebellion (Domino Recording Company). The LP was conceived entirely on analog machines (synthesizer, drum machine, sequencer, sampler) in Jimeno's home studio in Brooklyn. The Guardian described the album as "a record that shares messages of self-love and resilience that, embedded in her DIY approach, cut through with real resonance." It was largely praised by critics internationally, was playlisted on the BBC, and topped Radiónica's charts several times.

In 2021, Jimeno was a resident for BBC1. In July 2021, she performed live at the Chanel Haute Couture Winter 2021/22 show and dinner. Her music has been featured on multiple Chanel campaigns. She has also collaborated with Prada.

In September 2021, Jimeno performed at the Pitchfork Music Festival.

In February 2022, Jimeno began her North American tour and toured with Caribou. In April 2022, she performed at Coachella. Later in June, she played at Primavera Sound. Also that year, Jimeno played at festivals including III Points, Portola Festival, FORMAT, Festival Estereo Picnic, Fauna Otoño, and Sideways Festival.

In May 2023, Jimeno performed at Cruel World Festival in Pasadena, California. Later in 2023, on April 15 and 22, she performed again on opening day in Coachella, Indio California along with other industry artists such as Bad Bunny and Harry Styles.

On 17 January 2025, she released her second studio album, Día. It received universal acclaim from critics. She is scheduled to release Qué les pasó a mis amigos?, a collaborative EP with Nick León, on 7 August 2026.

=== Personal life ===
Jimeno is based in Brooklyn, New York.

== Style ==
Jimeno's compositions can be categorized mainly as electronic, with her main genres of influence including improvisational jazz and techno. She is musically inspired by Kraftwerk and early Daft Punk. When vocals are included in her music, she sings in both English and Spanish. The majority of her work is done with analog synthesizers and drum machines.

== Discography ==
Studio albums

- Acts of Rebellion (Domino Recording Company, 2020)
- Día (Domino Recording Company, 2025)

EPs

- First Words (self-released, 2015)
- Grow (self-released, 2016)
- Adapt (self-released, 2017)

Singles

- "OK.../So" (2018)
- "they told us it was hard, but they were wrong" (Domino Recording Company, 2020)
- "megapunk" (Domino Recording Company, 2020)
- "el cielo no es de nadie" (Domino Recording Company, 2020)
- "dominique" (Domino Recording Company, 2020)
- "Kiss U" featuring DJ Python (Domino Recording Company, 2022)
- "Combat" (Domino Recording Company, 2024)
- "Broken" (Domino Recording Company, 2024)
- "Upwards" (Domino Recording Company, 2024)
- "QQQQ" (Domino Recording Company, 2025)
- "Ghost Orchid" (Domino Recording Company, 2025)
