= Tracey Denim =

Studio album by Bar Italia
- Released: 19 May 2023
- Genre: Hypnagogic pop; post-punk; shoegaze
- Length: 43:44
- Language: English
- Label: Matador
- Producer: Bar Italia

Bar Italia chronology
eartH CD-R (2022)	Tracey Denim (2023)	The Twits (2023)

Tracey Denim is the third studio album by British alternative rock band Bar Italia, released on 19 May 2023, by Matador Records. It has received positive reviews from critics.

== Reception ==
Professional ratings
Aggregate scores
Source	Rating
AnyDecentMusic?	7.3/10
Metacritic	76/100
Review scores
Source	Rating
AllMusic	4/5 stars
Clash Music	9/10
The Line of Best Fit	8/10
Loud and Quiet	7/10
Mojo	3/5 stars
NME	4/5 stars
No Ripcord	7/10
Pitchfork	6.9/10
The Skinny	4/5 stars

Tracey Denim received generally positive reviews from music critics. At Metacritic, which assigns a normalized rating out of 100 to reviews from professional publications, the album received an average score of 76, based on 12 reviews, indicating "generally favorable reviews". Aggregator AnyDecentMusic? gave it 7.3 out of 10, based on 14 reviews.

Editors at AllMusic rated Tracey Denim 4 out of 5 stars, with critic Heather Phares writing that "it's an album that's complex enough for fans of the band's previous work, and just welcoming enough for a wider audience". Phillip Pyle of Clash Music gave the album a 9 out of 10 for lyrics that create rich mental images, a range of emotions, and being able to unravel "unravels sprawling and playful, yet concerted, development of [the band's] sound". At The Line of Best Fit, Joe Creely rated the album an 8 out of 10, calling it "an album that feels like a self-contained world without losing sight of songs that really work in and of themselves" that is "a natural development from the trio and one that points to an exciting future". For Loud and Quiet, Sam Walton rated Tracey Denim a 7 out of 10, stating that "despite working fairly tightly within the confines of idiomatic post-punk throughout, it doesn’t really sound like anything else in that bracket". With 3 stars out of 5 in Mojo, Stevie Chick praised the "terse honesty" of the band's lyrics and writes that this release sees "no monkeying with the formula: bedsit pop enervated by minor-key guitar chugs and sparse synths which are often over before you've unravelled their riddles".

Erica Campbell of NME rated Tracey Denim 4 out of 5 stars, with "15 impressively arranged tracks" that "chart a promising and imaginative course with their first release on Matador Records". No Ripcord's Juan Edgardo Rodriguez scored Tracey Denim a 7 out of 10 calling it a work that "mostly screams avant-garde in its minimalism, sometimes to its detriment". Philip Sherburne of Pitchfork gave the album a 6.9 out of 10, characterizing it as a "moody, moth-eaten record-collector rock that gets by on moody insouciance" and "a finely calibrated tribute to the evergreen sounds that have fueled underground rock for decades". Zara Hedderman of The Quietus writes that "thematically, Tracey Denim vacillates between the desire to “lose control”, navigating new realities [...] and the ensuing fear of what will happen in the process of letting someone go, of being alone [...] particularly [in the] excellent closing suite of songs". Patrick Gamble of The Skinny called the release "complex and seductive, without ever feeling pretentious", rating it 4 out of 5 stars. Editors at Stereogum chose Tracey Denim for Album of the Week, with critic Ted Davis remarking that "the album contains multitudes" and recommends that if listeners want to understand the elusive band, "it all comes down to getting lost in Tracey Denim's wonderfully understated racket".

Mojo ranked Tracey Denim the 69th best album of 2023. Gorilla vs. Bear rated it the 17th best album of 2023. Editors at The Fader chose it as the 48th best album of the year. Editors at Clash Music listed it as the 41st best album of the year. Editors at AllMusic included it on their list of favorite alternative and indie albums of 2023. The album was included in the 40 best independent albums of 2023 in BrooklynVegan's Indie Basement, along with the band's follow-up The Twits. Critics at Rolling Stone included it among the 40 best indie rock albums of 2023. At Under the Radar, it was rated the 97th best album of 2023.

== Track listing ==
1. "guard" – 2:23
2. "Nurse!" – 3:48
3. "punkt" – 2:26
4. "my kiss era" – 3:32
5. "F.O.B." – 2:16
6. "Missus Morality" – 4:12
7. "yes i have eaten so many lemons yes i am so bitte" – 2:59
8. "changer" – 3:29
9. "Horsey Girl Rider" – 2:44
10. "NOCD" – 2:56
11. "best in show" – 2:44
12. "Clark" – 2:24
13. "harpee" – 3:14
14. "Friends" – 1:52
15. "maddington" – 2:45

== Personnel ==
Bar Italia

- Nina Cristante
- Jezmi Fehmi
- Sam Fenton

Additional personnel

- Marta Salogni – mixing

== See also ==
- List of 2023 albums
