= The Dial (song) =

2018 single

Single by Squid
- Released: 21 September 2018
- Genre: Post-punk
- Length: 5:10; 3:49 (radio edit)
- Label: Speedy Wunderground
- Producer: Dan Carey

Squid singles chronology
"Terrestrial Changeover Blues (2007–2012)" (2018)	"The Dial" (2018)	"Houseplants" (2019)

"The Dial" is a song by British band Squid. It was released on 21 September 2018 through Speedy Wunderground on 7" and streaming services. The song saw the band get "much bolder and louder" than their debut EP, Lino. The song is about a loved one suffering from illness. Critics reviewed the song positively.

== Background ==
Squid is a British band made up of Ollie Judge, Louis Borlase, Arthur Leadbetter, Laurie Nankivell and Anton Pearson. The band would release their debut EP, Lino, in 2017 and a debut single, "Terrestrial Changeover Blues (2007–2012)" in 2018.

== Music and lyrics ==
"The Dial" has been described as post-punk. The track was produced by Dan Carey and recorded in under 24 hours. According to the band, the song's lyrics revolve around "a dear loved one suffering a horrible illness in hospital". While the patient's blood is being taken, the nurses turn into vampires and suck the blood from the other patients. The track begins with "a tight drum beat and relatively taut, funky guitar strut". As the songs continues, the instrumentation grows more intense. Judge's vocals "plunge in and out of a forceful, rasping screech" throughout.

== Release ==
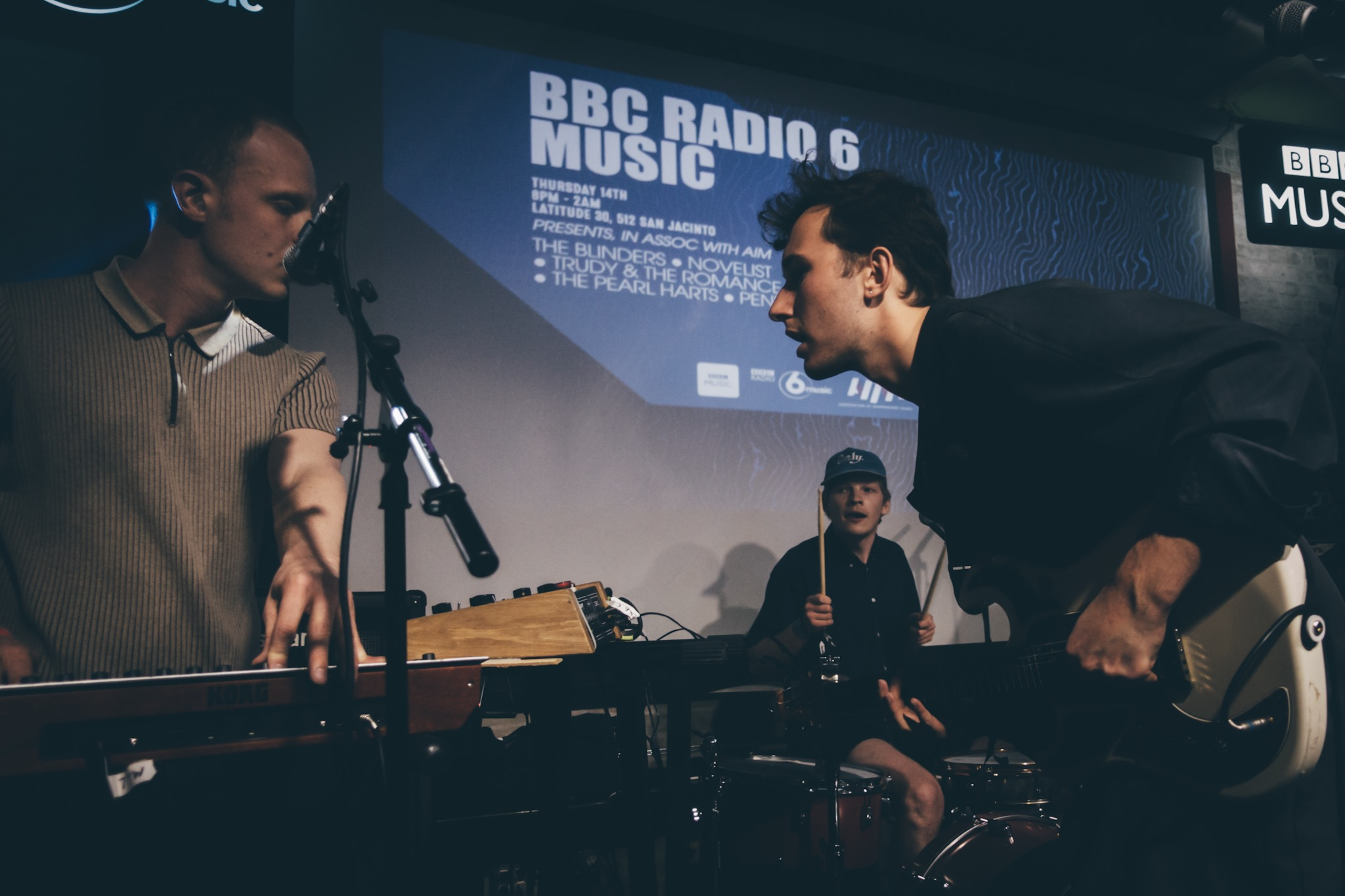
Squid in 2019

"The Dial" was released on 21 September 2018 through Speedy Wunderground. The song was released on streaming services and on a limited edition 7" vinyl record. In June 2019, before the release of Town Centre, Judge called the song a "big, massive step" in their music, and that "everything before ["The Dial"] was more us finding our feet."

On 1 December 2020, as part of an effort to prevent the Windmill from closing, the band put up a signed copy of "The Dial" for auction in order to raise funds.

== Reception ==
Critics responded positively to "The Dial". Reviewing the song for The Line of Best Fit, Amelia Maher called it "another electrifying offering" from the band that "shuns predictability in favour of exhilarating energy and excitement". A review of the song for DIY said the band had "shown themselves to be something really special" and called the track "as funky as it is heavy". Gil Green of Stereogum said the song had a "playful yet anarchist darkness" and an "angular groove that explodes into a spacey crash". In a review for Clash, Robin Murray called the song a "fantastic piece of minimalist guitar music". Jude Rogers of The Guardian said "The Dial" saw Squid "getting much bolder and louder" and that it saw them "siphoning the energy of early 00s groups such as the Rapture".

== Track listing ==
The Dial track listing
No.	Title	Length
1.	"The Dial"	5:10
2.	"The Dial (radio edit) (Note: Denoted as "Part 2" on the physical edition. Denoted as "Radio Edit" on streaming platforms.)"	3:49
Total length:		8:59
