= Bright Green Field =

Studio album by Squid
- Released: 7 May 2021
- Recorded: March – October 2020
- Studio: Mr. Dan's Studio (London)
- Genres: Post-punk; krautrock; new wave
- Length: 54:41
- Label: Warp
- Producer: Dan Carey

Squid chronology
| Natural Resources (2020) | Bright Green Field (2021) | O Monolith (2023) |

Singles from Bright Green Field
- 1. "Narrator" Released: 27 January 2021; 2. "Paddling" Released: 16 March 2021; 3. "Pamphlets" Released: 27 April 2021

Bright Green Field is the debut studio album by British band Squid. The album was recorded throughout 2020, and was released on 7 May 2021 through Warp Records. Three singles accompanied the album: "Narrator", released on 27 January; "Paddling", released on 16 March; and "Pamphlets", released on 27 April.

The album received widespread praise from critics, who enjoyed its energetic sound and blending of genres such as new wave, Krautrock, and post-punk revival characteristic of the Windmill scene. Some were more critical, stating that the album lacked innovation.

== Background and recording ==
Recorded throughout 2020, the album was produced by Dan Carey, who had been associated with many of the band's affiliated acts, including Black Midi, Fontaines D.C., and Black Country, New Road.

In an interview with Exclaim!, frontman Ollie Judge stated that the record's tracks "illustrate the places, events, and architecture that exist within (the album). Previous releases were playful and concerned with characters, whereas this album is darker and more concerned with the place — the emotional depth of the music has deepened."

The title of the album comes from a surrealist short story by Anna Kavan titled "Bright Green Field", in which the narrator is pursued by grass enveloping everything she sees. The ninth song on the album, "Peel St.," gets its name from the street Kavan lived on, and its lyrics mirror her novel Ice.

== Release and promotion ==
=== Singles ===
The band signed with Warp Records in March 2020 and, later that spring, released two standalone singles with the label, "Sludge" and "Broadcaster". In January 2021 the lead single off the album, "Narrator", was released, which corresponded with the album's announcement. According to the band, there was an extensive list of recordings undertaken for the production and mastering of the album, including a 30-person choir, a horn and string ensemble, and field recordings of bees.

=== Music videos ===
On 27 January 2021, the corresponding music video for the lead single "Narrator" was released. The music video was directed by Felix Geen and features the band playing in a broken 3D-rendered space. Geen said that he "wanted to make a video about the virtual creation process. For example, showing the components and processes behind virtual environment construction and looking closely at those small rocks, pieces of terrain and chunks of regolith that slot together to build something bigger. I often think this 'behind the digital curtain' part of 3D design looks more interesting than the final finished product since it conveys a process and an authorship".

On 18 May 2021, a music video for the album's third single, "Pamphlets", was premiered and released on the band's YouTube channel. It was created and directed by Raman Djafari, while Barney Abrahams did the rigging and character animation. Of the video, the band stated that "when planning the music videos for the album, we wanted to make sure we covered a few different mediums, so we're super happy to have a freaky animation crossed off the list."

== Critical reception ==
Professional ratings
Aggregate scores
| Source | Rating |
|---|---|
| AnyDecentMusic? | 8.5/10 |
| Metacritic | 89/100 |
Review scores
| Source | Rating |
| AllMusic | 4.5/5 stars |
| Clash | 9/10 |
| Exclaim! | 9/10 |
| The Independent | 4/5 stars |
| The Line of Best Fit | 10/10 |
| NME | 5/5 stars |
| The Observer | 3/5 stars |
| Paste | 8.0/10 |
| Pitchfork | 8.0/10 |
| The Skinny | 3/5 stars |

Bright Green Field received widespread acclaim from critics. At Metacritic, which assigns a normalised rating out of 100 to reviews from mainstream publications, the album received a weighted average score of 89, based on 19 reviews, indicating "universal acclaim".

NME gave the album a perfect-score rave review, with Will Richards calling it "[a]n uncompromising debut that fulfils every ounce of the band's potential". He wrote that "(across) the album, which tops 50-minutes in length, the band veer between genres, styles and moods with abandon, mirroring the frightening, ever-changing political and cultural landscape it was created in." In another perfect-score review, Alice Jenner of The Line of Best Fit hailed the album as "a debut for the ages" and praised its "perfect blend of calm and chaos [...] they stitch together moments of quintessential jazz and soul harmony with cacophonous punk impulse."

US publications like Paste found that the band's "utter disregard for rock convention elevates Bright Green Field's paranoid, vaguely dystopian universe". Timothy Monger of AllMusic called the "much-anticipated debut album" an "energetic shouting match of vivid new wave, Krautrock, and post-punk influences". He went on to note that "[i]n some ways, their debut carries the absurdist lineage [of] 'Houseplants' and 'The Cleaner', two of the Squid's [sic] best-known singles, though it's also clearly its own monster. Like an avalanche gathering up everything in its path, Squid seem to thrive on evolution and an inherent sense of danger." He concluded that as "(truly) a band for the times, Squid feels like a wild jumble of thoughts come to life, effusing anger, confusion, humor, detachment, and even joyfulness in their pursuit of true creative freedom." Meanwhile, Mojo's Andrew Perry called the album a "thrilling post-punk/Krautrock collision", also directing praise toward Carey's production and Judge's vocals.

A mixed review came from The Skinny whose Tony Inglis called the group "the guitar boys' buzz band of the moment". He noted that the album "follows in the footsteps of their best track The Cleaner – supercharging the banal and mundane with vigour and purpose – it rips, mixing genres like straight-ahead indie-rock with funk and jazz, and exploring ambient and textural backdrops which make their now-home Warp apt." Writing for The Observer, Emily Mackay was also critical of the album, claiming that "Nothing here is truly experimental or innovative – it's more the kind of music that gets labelled as such because of the influences it shows."

=== Accolades ===
Bright Green Field on year-end lists
| Publication | Country | List | Rank | Ref. |
|---|---|---|---|---|
| Bleep | UK | Top 10 Albums of the Year 2021 | 2 | |
| Far Out Magazine | UK | The five best post-punk albums of 2021 | 2 | |
| Les Inrockuptibles | FR | Carole Boinet's Top 10 Albums of 2021 | 4 | |
| Les Inrockuptibles | FR | Théo Dubreuil's Top 10 Albums of 2021 | 3 | |
| NRC Handelsblad | NL | Jan Vollaard's best music of 2021 | 1 | |
| Paste | US | The 50 Best Albums of 2021 | 18 | |
| Rough Trade | UK | Albums of the Year 2021 | 6 | |

== Track listing ==
Bright Green Field track listing
| No. | Title | Length |
|---|---|---|
| 1. | "Resolution Square" | 0:40 |
| 2. | "G.S.K." | 3:10 |
| 3. | "Narrator" (featuring Martha Skye Murphy) | 8:28 |
| 4. | "Boy Racers" | 7:34 |
| 5. | "Paddling" | 6:15 |
| 6. | "Documentary Filmmaker" | 4:55 |
| 7. | "2010" | 4:28 |
| 8. | "The Flyover" | 1:10 |
| 9. | "Peel St." | 4:52 |
| 10. | "Global Groove" | 5:06 |
| 11. | "Pamphlets" | 8:03 |
| Total length: | | 54:41 |

Japanese edition (bonus tracks)
| No. | Title | Length |
|---|---|---|
| 12. | "Sludge" | 5:00 |
| 13. | "Broadcaster" | 5:56 |
| Total length: | | 65:37 |

== Personnel ==
- Ollie Judge – lead vocals, drums
- Louis Borlase – guitar, bass guitar, vocals
- Arthur Leadbetter – keyboards, cello, percussion
- Laurie Nankivell – bass guitar, cornet, percussion
- Anton Pearson – guitar, bass, vocals, percussion
- Nataly Corolscaia – violin
- Lewis Evans – alto saxophone
- Georgia Hannington – cello
- Charlie Keen – trombone
- Yulia Knowles – viola
- Emma-Jean Thackray – trumpet
- Martha Skye Murphy – vocals on "Narrator"

== Charts ==
Chart performance for Bright Green Field
| Chart (2021) | Peak position |
|---|---|
| Belgian Albums (Ultratop Flanders) | 31 |
| Belgian Albums (Ultratop Wallonia) | 153 |
| Dutch Albums (Album Top 100) | 80 |
| Irish Albums (IRMA) | 93 |
| Scottish Albums (Official Charts) | 5 |
| UK Albums (Official Charts) | 4 |
| UK Independent Albums (Official Charts) | 1 |
