= Circuit des Yeux =

American musician

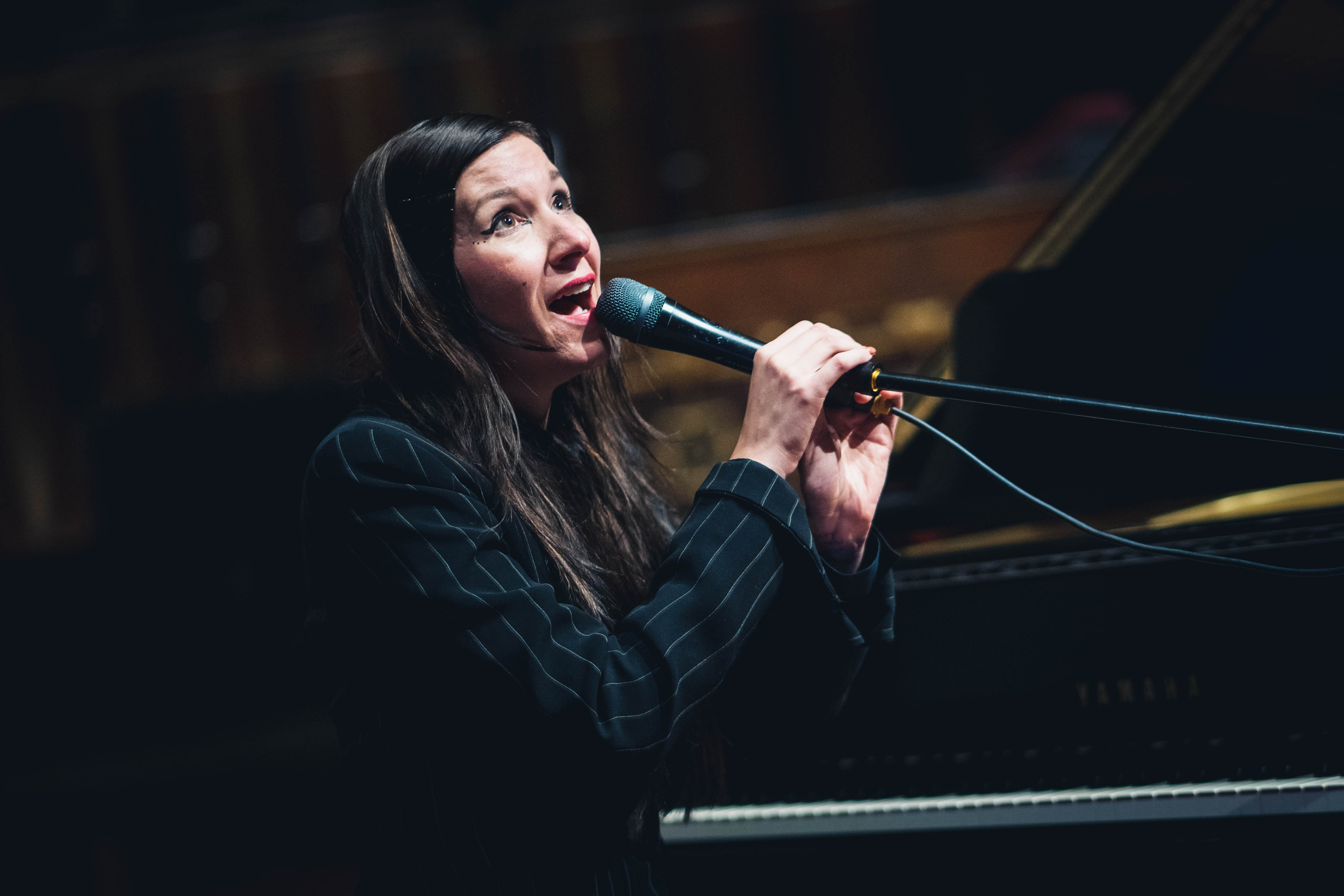
- Circuit des Yeux in the UK in 2022

Background information
- Also known as: Jackie Lynn
- Born: Haley Fohr; December 16, 1988 (age 37); Lafayette, Indiana
- Genres: Avant-garde; art pop; folk
- Instruments: Vocals; keyboards; guitar; bass
- Years active: 2007–present

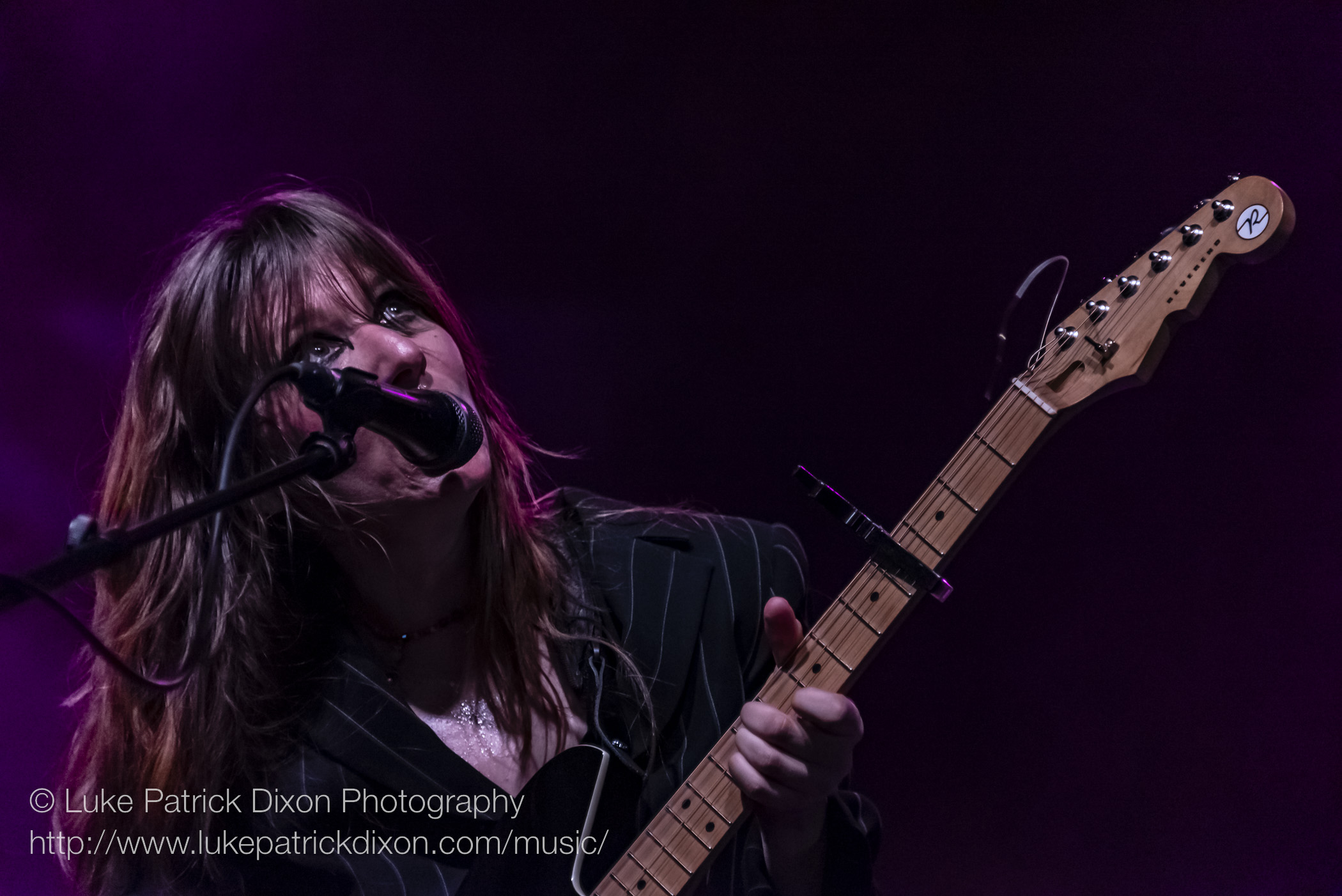
Circuit des Yeux performing at End of the Road festival in 2022

Circuit des Yeux ((/ˈsɜːrkɪt ˈdeɪ ju/); born December 16, 1988) is the stage name of American vocalist, composer, and singer-songwriter Haley Fohr, based in Chicago. Her music is characterized by her 4-octave vocal range and 12-string guitar playing. Fohr also makes music under the name Jackie Lynn.

== History ==
Fohr was born in Lafayette, Indiana. She began releasing music as Circuit des Yeux in 2007. The following year, she released her debut album, Symphone. This debut LP was released in a limited edition by De Stijl. In 2009, Fohr released her sophomore album, titled Sirenum, on the same label. In the same year, Fohr released a 7-inch single on Dull Knife Records. In 2010, Fohr released a three-song 7-inch EP on De Stijl, titled Ode to Fidelity, and this release signified Fohr's transition to more song-based music. In 2011, Fohr released her third full-length album, Portrait, on the label De Stijl, and this album had cleaner recording quality than previous releases.

Fohr graduated from college in 2012 and relocated from Bloomington, Indiana, to Chicago, where she became involved in the city's music scene and began collaborating and recording with other artists in the area. In 2013, Fohr self-released her fourth full-length album, titled Overdue.

In 2014, Circuit des Yeux toured and played more than 100 shows with other folk and experimental musicians, including Loren Connors, Sir Richard Bishop, and Bill Callahan. Later in the same year, Fohr contributed vocals to the album The Voice Rolling by Mind Over Mirrors, an experimental ambient project by musician Jaime Fennelly. The album was released by Immune Recordings in early 2015, and Fohr and Fennelly toured together.

In 2015, Fohr released her first album with the Chicago-based indie/experimental label Thrill Jockey, In Plain Speech. In August 2016, Fohr was featured on the cover of The Wire for her work under the pseudonym Jackie Lynn. In 2017, Fohr released her sixth album and first with Drag City, titled Reaching For Indigo. Meg Remy of U.S. Girls edited the video for the track "Paper Bag," a single on Reaching for Indigo.

In 2021, Fohr signed to Matador Records and released her seventh full-length album, -io, on October 22. She created -io during the COVID-19 pandemic, and regarding the album, said "I was haunted by memories in the pandemic... As someone with PTSD, memories are all twisted up inside of me in a way that doesn't help my higher self. Making this album was once again an exercise of trying to relieve myself of some of that darkness in a way that music has always done for me."

Fohr released a single titled "The Manatee (A Story of This World pt. III)" in February 2022 and she appeared at the End of the Road Festival in the UK in September "with a baritone that could beach a pod of whales and a falsetto that could calve icebergs".

Fohr released her seventh studio album, Halo on the Inside, on March 14, 2025, via Matador Records.

== Musical styles and influences ==
Fohr's music under her primary alias (Circuit des Yeux) is described as "haunting, emotionally complex music that relates to the human condition." She began releasing experimental indie folk music in 2007 as a part of this project. Fohr began writing and self-recording music that was described as "nightmare-like atonal pieces caked in distortion and tape hiss." Her earlier releases have a noisy, lo-fi sound that later evolved into "exquisite" arrangements on her critically acclaimed albums In Plain Speech (2015) and Reaching for Indigo (2017). Fohr's 2021 album -io features grand orchestral arrangements that required more than a dozen musicians to record. These local collaborators brought together Chicago's jazz, classical, and experimental music scenes to create the sounds of -io. Fohr is a contralto.

Jackie Lynn is a fictional persona of Haley Fohr, who releases music under the pseudonym. Fohr's work as Lynn is more playful and fantasy-driven than her more introspective work as Circuit des Yeux and combines influences from country, disco, and synth pop. Fohr has created a narrative backstory for Lynn, beginning with her birth in Franklin, Tennessee in 1990, and including her move to Chicago just before her 20th birthday, meeting a man named Tom Strong, and beginning a multi-million dollar cocaine business with him. Fohr's 2016 album Jackie Lynn contains songs related to this fictional backstory, and the album contains contributions from members of the bands Bitchin Bajas and Cave. The "self"-titled album features minimalistic arrangements, acoustic guitars, drum machines, and songwriting that is more "straightforward" than Fohr's releases as Circuit des Yeux. The fictional narrative continues in Fohr's second album as Lynn, Jacqueline (2020), which incorporates disco beats and string arrangements into Lynn's sound.

== Discography ==
=== Albums ===
- Symphone (2008)
- Sirenum (2008)
- Portrait (2011)
- Overdue (2013)
- In Plain Speech (2015)
- Reaching For Indigo (2017)
- -io (2021)
- Halo on the Inside (2025)

=== EPs ===
- Reaching for Indigo: Gaia Infinitus (2019)
- Live from Chicago (2022)

=== Singles ===
- "Circuit Des Yeux" (2009)
- "Ode to Fidelity" (2010)
- "CDY3" (2013)
- "Stranger" (2015)
- "Dogma" (2021)
- "Sculpting the Exodus" (2021)
- "Vanishing" (2021)
- "The Manatee (A Story of This World Pt. III)" (2022)
- "God Dick" (2024)

=== Releases as Jackie Lynn ===
- Jackie Lynn - LP (2016)
- "Casino Queen" - Single (2020)
- "Shugar Water" - Single (2020)
- "Dream St." - Single (2020)
- Jaqueline - LP (2020)
- "Traveler's Code of Conduct (Acoustic)" b/w "Dream St. (Acoustic)" - Single (2022)
