= Martha Skye Murphy =

21st-century British musician and actress

Martha Skye Murphy is a British musician and actress.

== History ==
In 2020, Murphy released the EP Heal. In 2022, Murphy released an electronic opera titled Postcards Home which she premiered at the Southbank Centre, London. Murphy's debut album, Um, was released in 2024 to critical acclaim with the label AD93. Murphy has collaborated with Roy Montgomery, Squid, LEYA, Nick Cave and Warren Ellis.
