= Squid (band) =

British post-punk band

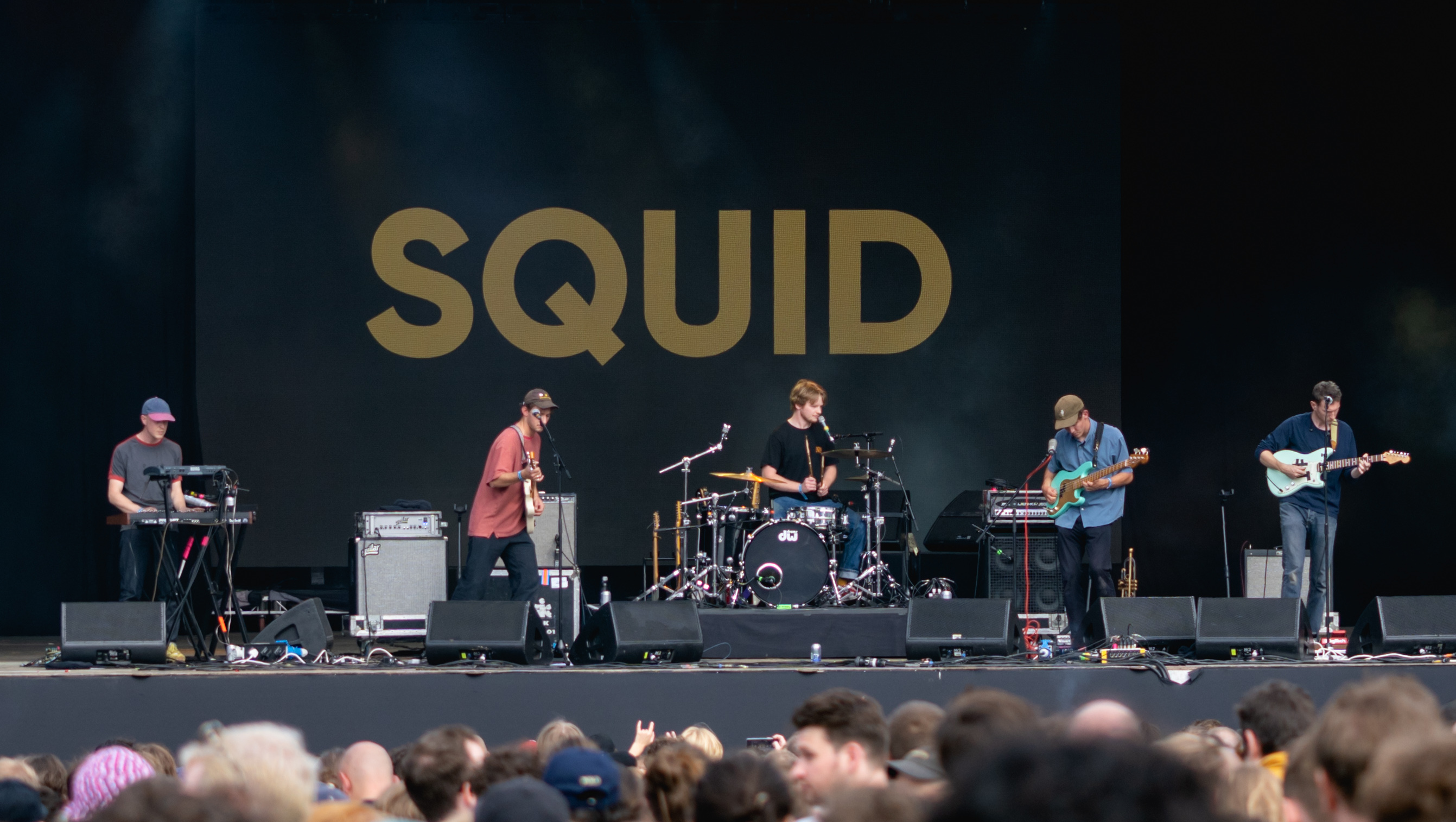
- Squid performing at Wide Awake Festival, 2021

Background information
- Origin: Brighton, England
- Genres: Post-punk; crank wave; experimental rock; art punk; art rock
- Years active: 2016–present
- Labels: Speedy Wunderground; Warp
- Members: Ollie Judge; Louis Borlase; Arthur Leadbetter; Laurie Nankivell; Anton Pearson
- Website: squidband.uk

Squid are an English rock band formed in Brighton in 2016. The band consists of Ollie Judge (vocals, drums), Louis Borlase (guitar, vocals), Anton Pearson (guitar, vocals), Laurie Nankivell (bass, brass) and Arthur Leadbetter (keyboards). They are currently based in Bristol.

A Windmill scene band, Squid independently released their debut EP, LINO, in 2017, which was followed by several stand-alone singles and the EP Town Centre in 2019 on Speedy Wunderground. Their debut album, Bright Green Field, was released by Warp Records on 7 May 2021. It received widespread critical acclaim and debuted at No. 4 on the UK Albums Chart. Their second album, O Monolith, was released in 2023 to similar acclaim. Their third album, Cowards, was released in 2025. The band released their first live album CROWDS in 2026.

== History ==
Squid formed in Brighton, England, in 2016. They have cited Neu! and This Heat as influences. In 2019, they released their second EP, titled Town Centre, to critical acclaim. Town Centre was produced by Dan Carey and released on Speedy Wunderground. In March 2020, Squid signed to Warp Records and have released five singles with them as of April 2021. They were planning on touring Europe throughout 2020 before the COVID-19 pandemic.

Taking advantage of lockdown, the band spent most of 2020 recording what would be their debut album, Bright Green Field, again working with producer Dan Carey. The album was released on 7 May 2021 and was promoted by three singles, "Narrator", "Paddling" and "Pamphlets".

Squid appeared at the Glastonbury Festival in June 2022, and appeared at the Rock en Seine and Paredes de Coura festivals in August 2022. They replaced Viagra Boys at La Route Du Rock festival in August 2023.

Squid recorded their second album, O Monolith, in Wiltshire in early 2022, before releasing it on 9 June 2023, once again with Warp Records.

In November 2024, Squid announced their third album, Cowards. It was released on 7 February 2025 through Warp Records.

== Members ==
Current

- Ollie Judge – lead vocals, drums
- Louis Borlase – guitar, bass, backing and occasional lead vocals
- Arthur Leadbetter – keyboards, strings, percussion
- Laurie Nankivell – bass, brass, percussion
- Anton Pearson – guitar, bass, backing and occasional lead vocals, percussion
Squid performing at Wide Awake Festival 2021

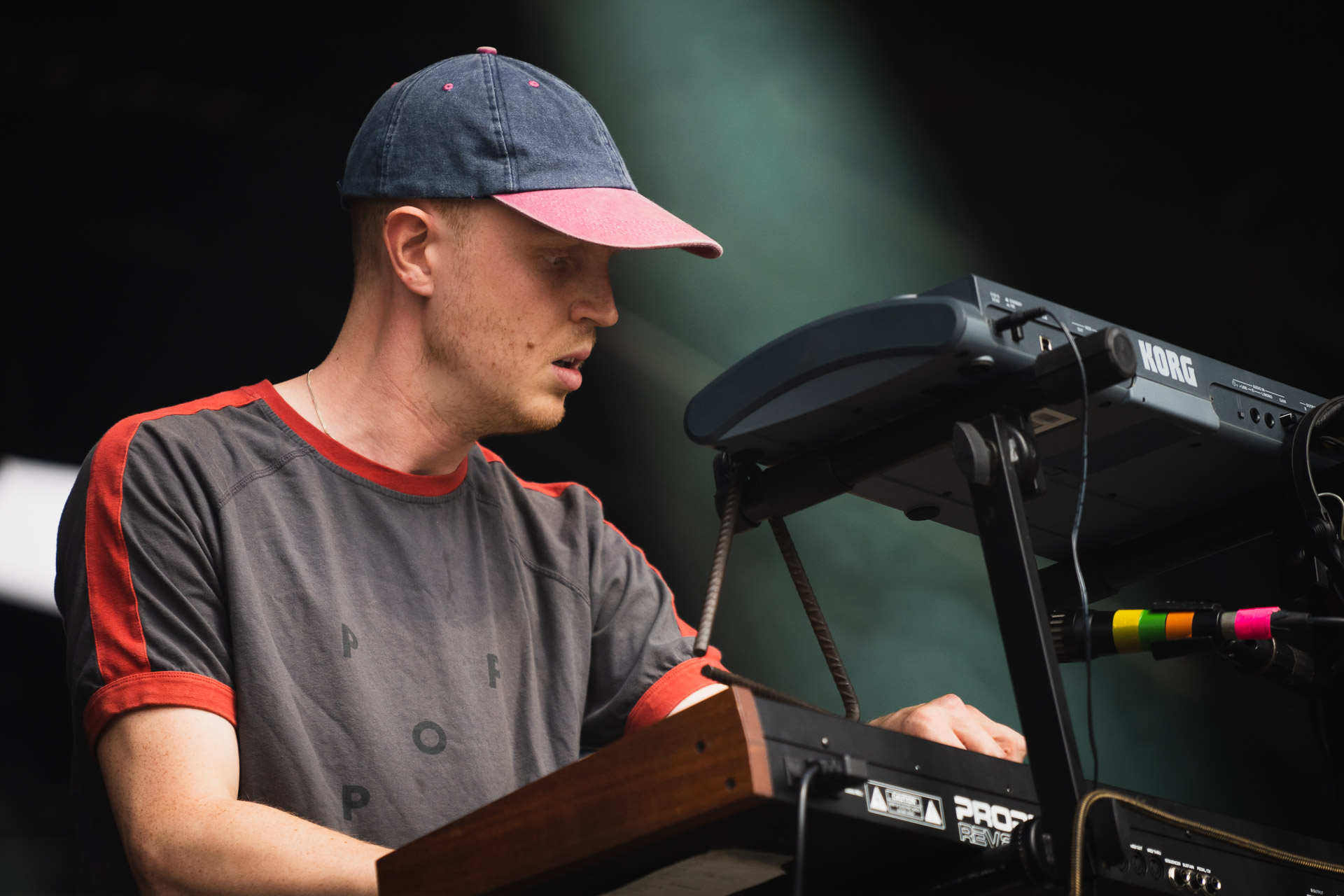
Arthur Leadbetter

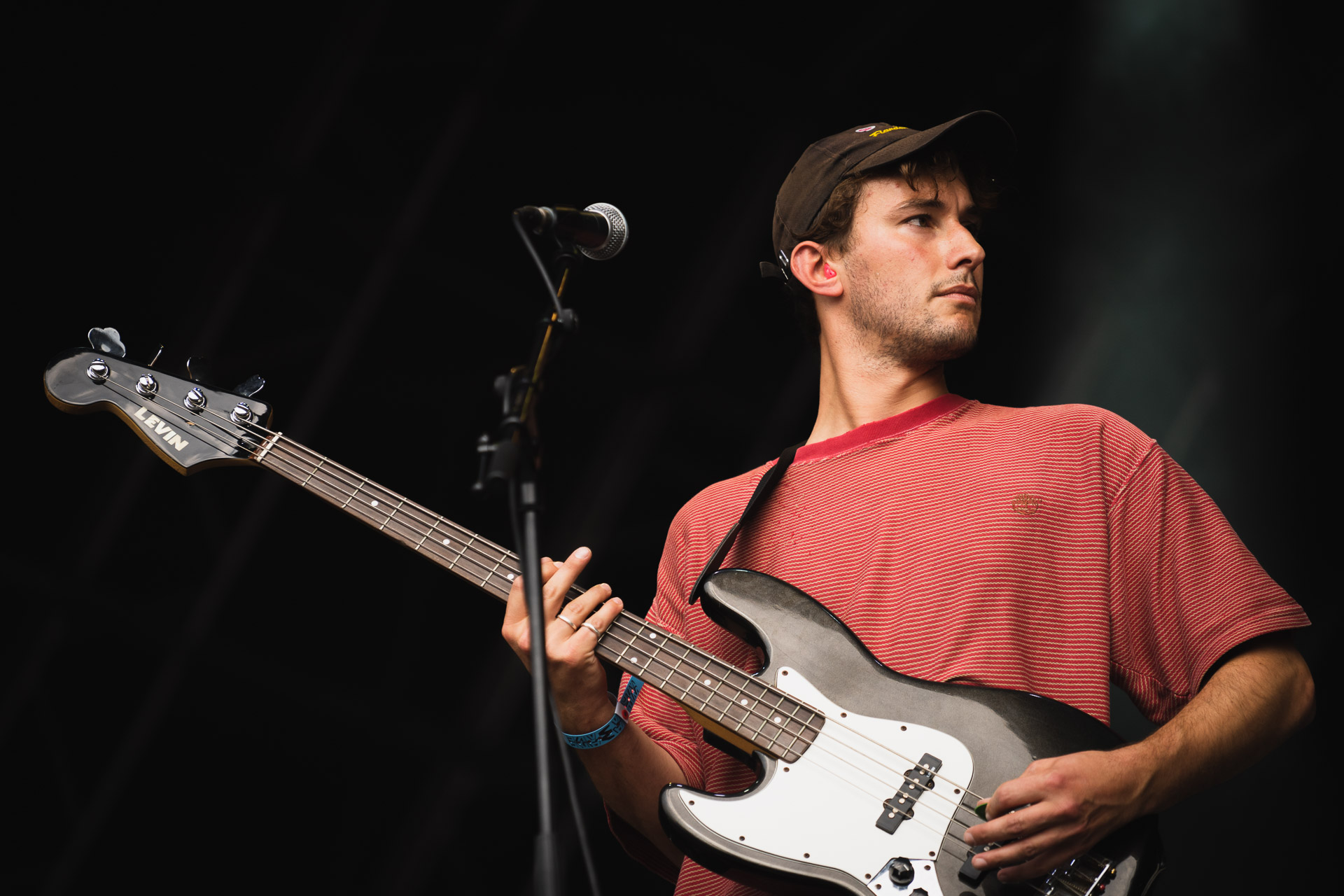
Louis Borlase

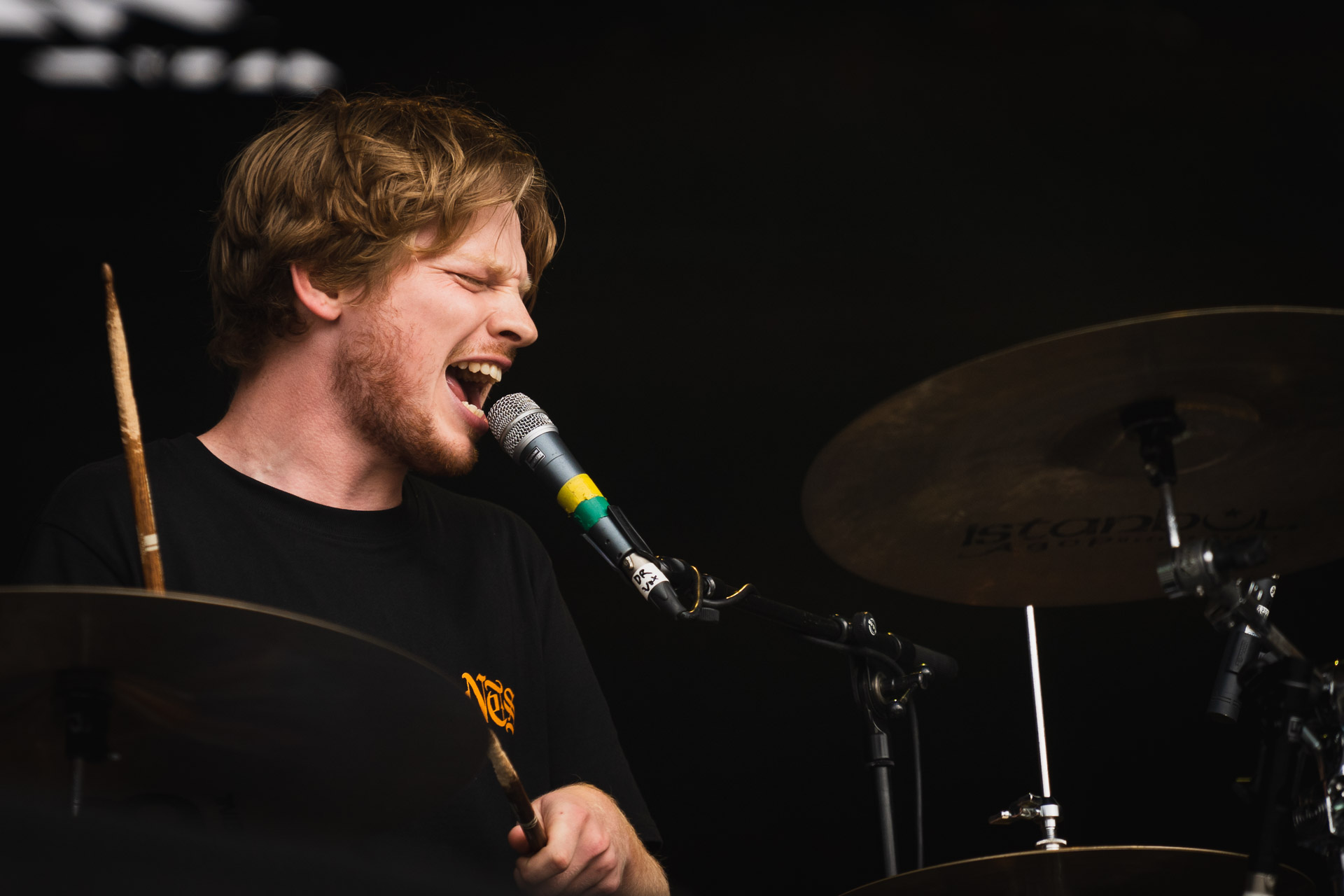
Ollie Judge

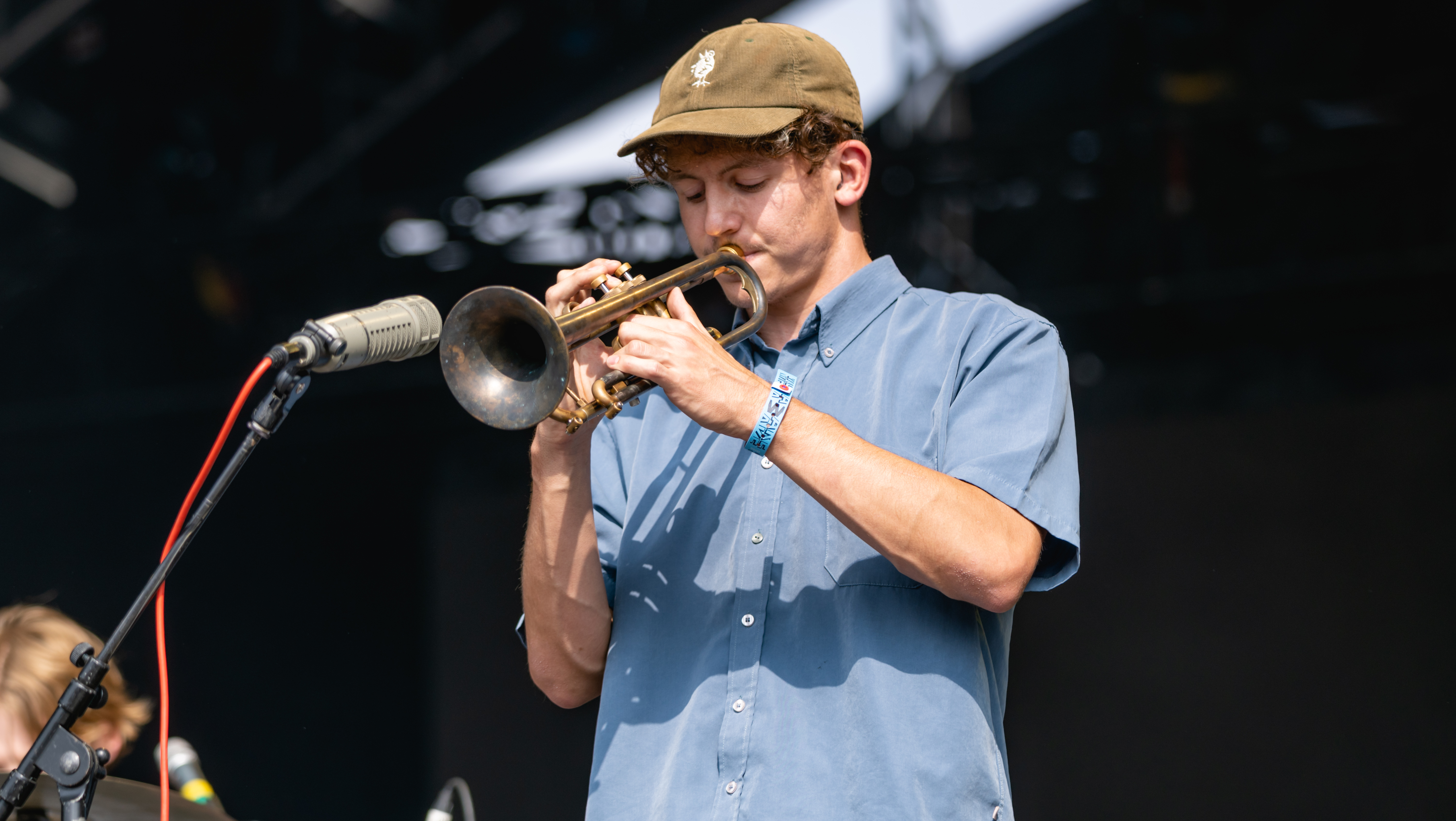
Laurie Nankivell

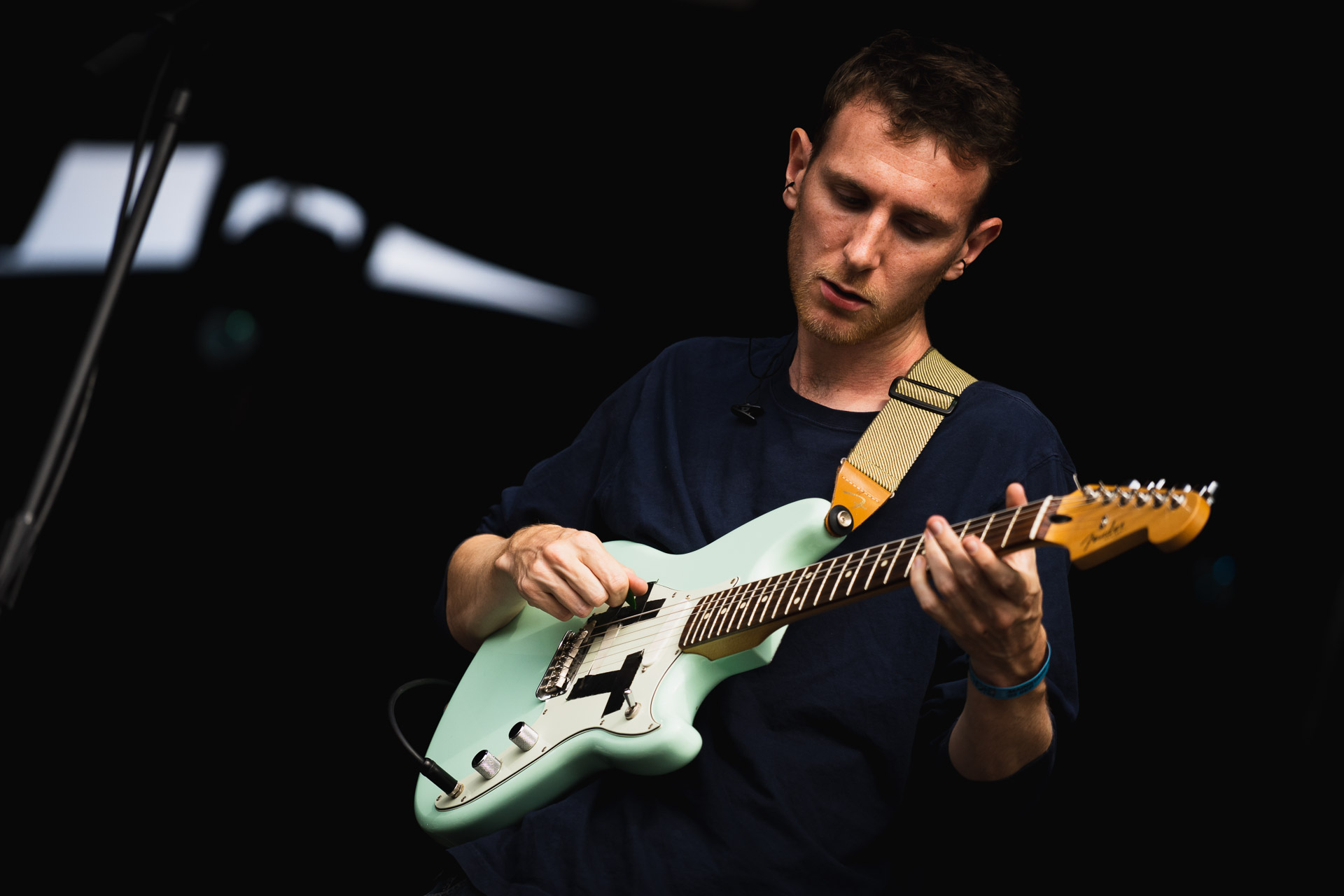
Anton Pearson

== Discography ==
=== Studio albums ===
List of studio albums, with selected chart positions
Title	Album details	Peak chart positions			
Title	Album details	UK	UK Indie	IRL	SCO
Bright Green Field	Released: 7 May 2021; Label: Warp	4	1	93	5
O Monolith	Released: 9 June 2023; Label: Warp	34	6	—	13
Cowards	Release date: 7 February 2025; Label: Warp	92	5	—	17
"—" denotes a recording that did not chart or was not released in that territory.

=== Extended plays ===
- LINO (2017, Bear on a Bicycle)
- Town Centre (2019, Speedy Wunderground)
- Natural Resources (2020, Warp)
- Near the Westway (2021, Warp)

=== Singles ===
List of singles, showing year released and album or EP released on
Title	Year	Album
"Perfect Teeth"	2016	Non-album singles
"Terrestrial Changeover Blues (2007–2012)"	2018	Non-album singles
"The Dial"	2018	Non-album singles
"Houseplants"	2019	Non-album singles
"The Cleaner"	2019	Town Centre
"Match Bet"	2019	Town Centre
"Sludge"	2020	Non-album singles
"Broadcaster"	2020	Non-album singles
"Narrator"	2021	Bright Green Field
"Paddling"	2021	Bright Green Field
"Pamphlets"	2021	Bright Green Field
"America!"	2021	Non-album singles
"Swing (In a Dream)"	2023	O Monolith
"Undergrowth"	2023	O Monolith
"The Blades"	2023	O Monolith
"Fugue (Bin Song)"	2024	Non-album singles
"Crispy Skin"	2024	Cowards
"Building 650"	2025	Cowards
"Cro-Magnon Man"	2025	Cowards
"The Hearth and Circle Round Fire"	2025	Cowards (Deluxe Edition)

=== Music videos ===
List of music videos, showing year released and director
Title	Year	Album	Director(s)
"Perfect Teeth"	2016	Non-album singles	Ollie Judge
"Clapping Music"	2019	Non-album singles	Rutare Savage
"Sludge"	2020	Non-album singles	Ali Amiri
"Broadcaster"	2020	Non-album singles	Wieslawa Ruta
"Narrator"	2021	Bright Green Field	Felix Geen
"Pamphlets"	2021	Bright Green Field	Raman Djafari
"Swing (In a Dream)"	2023	O Monolith	Yoonha Park
"Undergrowth"	2023	O Monolith	Louis Borlase
"The Blades"	2023	O Monolith	Kasper Haggstrom
"Crispy Skin"	2024	Cowards	Takashi Ito
"Building 650"	2025	Cowards	Felix Geen, Daisuke Hasegawa & Kuya Tatsujo
"Cro-Magnon Man"	2025	Cowards	Rory Alexander Stewart
