= Everything Perfect Is Already Here =

Studio album by Claire Rousay
- Released: April 22, 2022
- Genre: Ambient
- Length: 30:16
- Label: Shelter Press

Claire Rousay chronology
Never Stop Texting Me (2022)	Everything Perfect Is Already Here (2022)	Sentiment (2024)

Everything Perfect Is Already Here is a studio album by Canadian-American musician Claire Rousay. It was released on April 22, 2022, through Shelter Press. It received universal acclaim from critics.

== Background ==
Everything Perfect Is Already Here is a proper follow-up to A Softer Focus (2021). The album consists of two 15-minute pieces: "It Feels Foolish to Care" and "Everything Perfect Is Already Here". It features contributions from Alex Cunningham (on violin), Mari Maurice (on electronics and violin), Marilu Donovan (on harp), and Theodore Cale Schafer (on piano).

The album was released on April 22, 2022, through Shelter Press.

== Critical reception ==
Professional ratings
Aggregate scores
Source	Rating
Metacritic	82/100
Review scores
Source	Rating
The Guardian	4/5 stars
Mojo	4/5 stars
Pitchfork	7.5/10
Uncut	7/10

According to the review aggregator Metacritic, Everything Perfect Is Already Here received "universal acclaim" based on a weighted average score of 82 out of 100 from 5 critic scores.

Tayyab Amin of The Guardian stated, "Between Rousay's drones and disruptions, melodics and arguments, the album becomes a place for feeling in the present, untethered by time, as familiar as a memory and as placeless as a dream." Stephen Worthy of Mojo wrote, "Everything Perfect Is Already Here avoids emotional overload, instead offering solace and a loving embrace, a haven of calm and normality." Sam Richards of Uncut described the album as "the sound of everyday thoughts and routines magnified into an engrossing deep listen."

=== Accolades ===
Year-end lists for Everything Perfect Is Already Here
Publication	List	Rank	Ref.
Loud and Quiet	Loud and Quiet Albums of the Year 2022	15	
The Quietus	Quietus Albums of the Year 2022	15	

== Track listing ==
Everything Perfect Is Already Here track listing
No.	Title	Length
1.	"It Feels Foolish to Care"	15:05
2.	"Everything Perfect Is Already Here"	15:11
Total length:		30:16

Notes

- All track titles are stylized in all lowercase.

== Personnel ==
Credits adapted from liner notes.

- Claire Rousay – music
- Alex Cunningham – violin
- Mari Maurice – electronics, violin
- Marilu Donovan – harp
- Theodore Cale Schafer – piano
- Stephan Mathieu – mastering
- Katie Fuller – artwork
- Bartolomé Sanson – layout
