= A Little Death (album) =

Studio album by Claire Rousay
- Released: October 31, 2025
- Genres: Field recordings; musique concrète; minimalism
- Length: 31:05
- Label: Thrill Jockey

Claire Rousay chronology
No Floor (2025)	A Little Death (2025)

Singles from A Little Death
- 1. "Just" Released: August 19, 2025; 2. "Somewhat Burdensome" Released: September 16, 2025

A Little Death is a studio album by Canadian-American musician and composer Claire Rousay. It was released on October 31, 2025, via Thrill Jockey.

== Background ==
On August 19, 2025, Rousay announced A Little Death and released the lead single from the album, "Just", featuring ambient musician M. Sage. She released the second single from the album, "Somewhat Burdensome", on September 16, 2025. A Little Death is the third of a trilogy of albums by Rousay, the first two being A Heavenly Touch in 2020 and A Softer Focus in 2021. The album is named for a wine bar in San Antonio called Little Death, where Rousay made the first recordings for the album in 2021.

== Composition ==
A Little Death is a departure from her 2024 album Sentiment, which was more pop-oriented. The album is based on field recordings that Claire Rousay took at night. Rousay called the album "a return to what I see as my core solo practice" and "a re-dedication to those methods of working which I've found most align with what I envision my music or sound to be." Sharon O'Connell of Uncut described A Little Death as "a combination of field recordings, musique concrète, minimalism and experi-tronics."

== Critical reception ==
Professional ratings
Aggregate scores
Source	Rating
Metacritic	78/100
Review scores
Source	Rating
AllMusic	4/5 stars
The Skinny	4/5 stars
Uncut	7/10

According to the review aggregator Metacritic, A Little Death received "generally favorable reviews" based on a weighted average score of 78 out of 100 from 9 critic scores.

=== Accolades ===
Year-end lists for A Little Death
Publication	List	Rank	Ref.
AllMusic	Favorite Electronic Albums	—	

== Track listing ==
A Little Death track listing
No.	Title	Length
1.	"I Couldn't Find the Light"	0:54
2.	"Conditional Love"	2:52
3.	"Just" (featuring M. Sage)	3:29
4.	"Somehow"	5:44
5.	"Night One"	1:17
6.	"Doubt"	3:35
7.	"Somewhat Burdensome"	5:20
8.	"A Little Death"	7:54
Total length:		31:05

Notes

- All tracks are stylized in lower case.
