= Zoom H4n Handy Recorder =

Digital recording device manufactured by Zoom

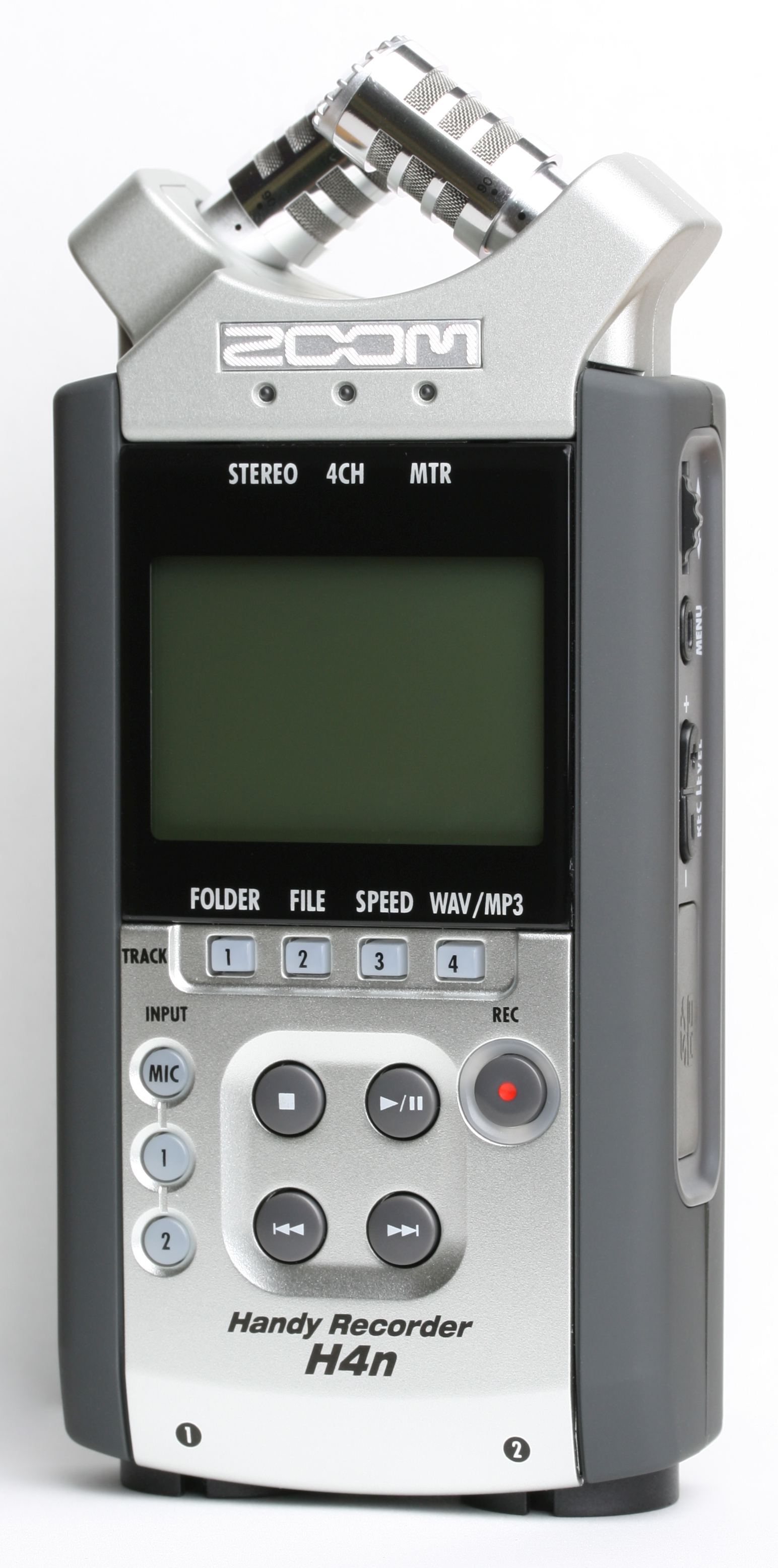
A Zoom H4n digital recorder

The Zoom H4n is a digital recording device manufactured by Zoom. It is the successor of the Zoom H4 recorder. Both models have two built-in condenser mics arranged in X/Y stereo position and two XLR microphone inputs that double as 1/4 inch phono jacks for musical instruments. Musical applications for the H4N include the ability to use the device as a multi-track (four-channel) recorder; the device also includes tools like a built-in tuner, metronome and effects processor for line-level instruments like guitars.

The H4n has a rubberized casing, a larger screen and buttons that differ from the H4. The H4n (with firmware version 1.01) was released in February 2009. A firmware update to version 1.9 was released in October, 2015.

The recorder has become very popular as an audio add on to DSLR video cameras, as well as with podcasters.

In 2015, the Zoom H4n Pro, the successor to the H4n, was introduced. It features improved preamps and a new rubberized case design.

== Gallery ==
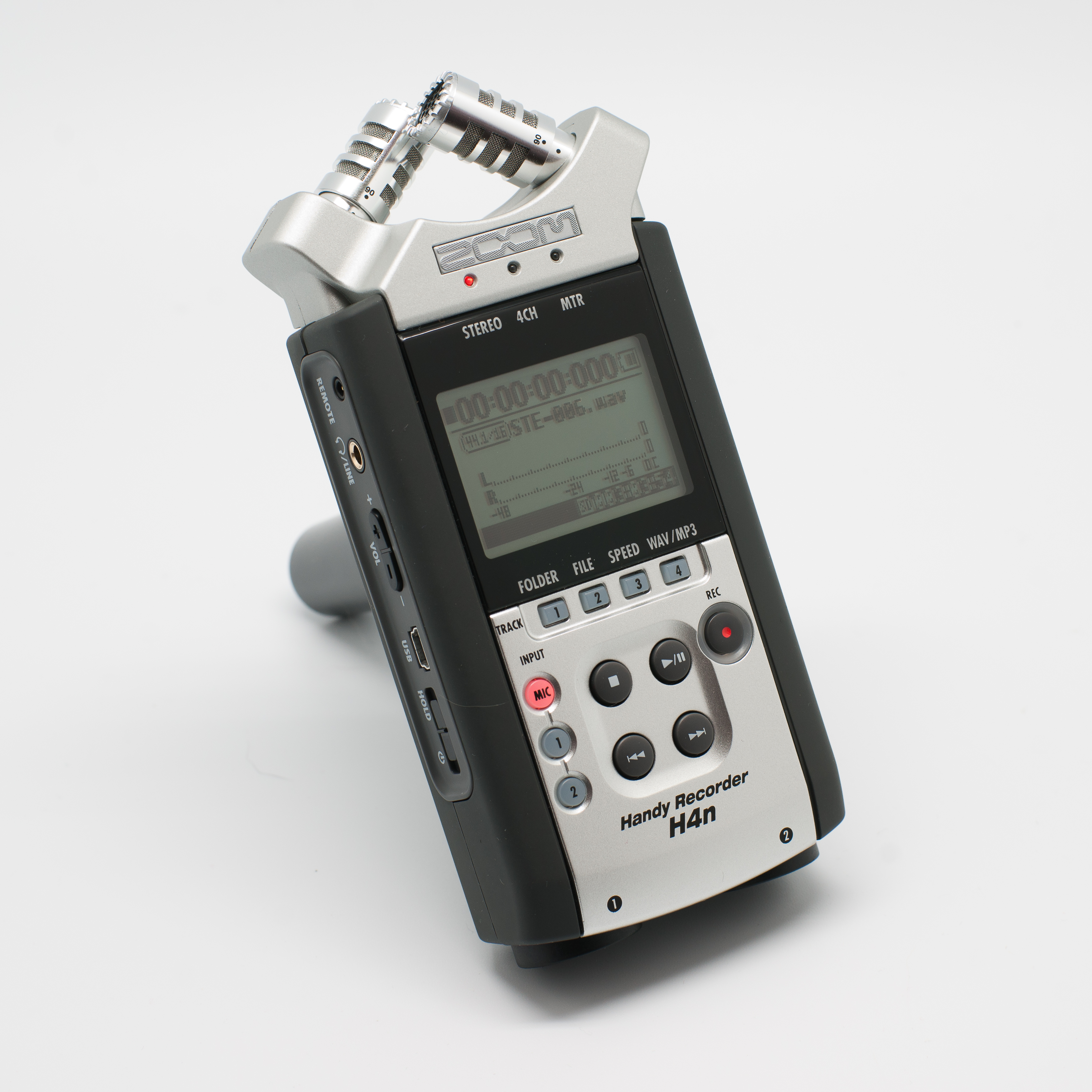
The recorder's front side

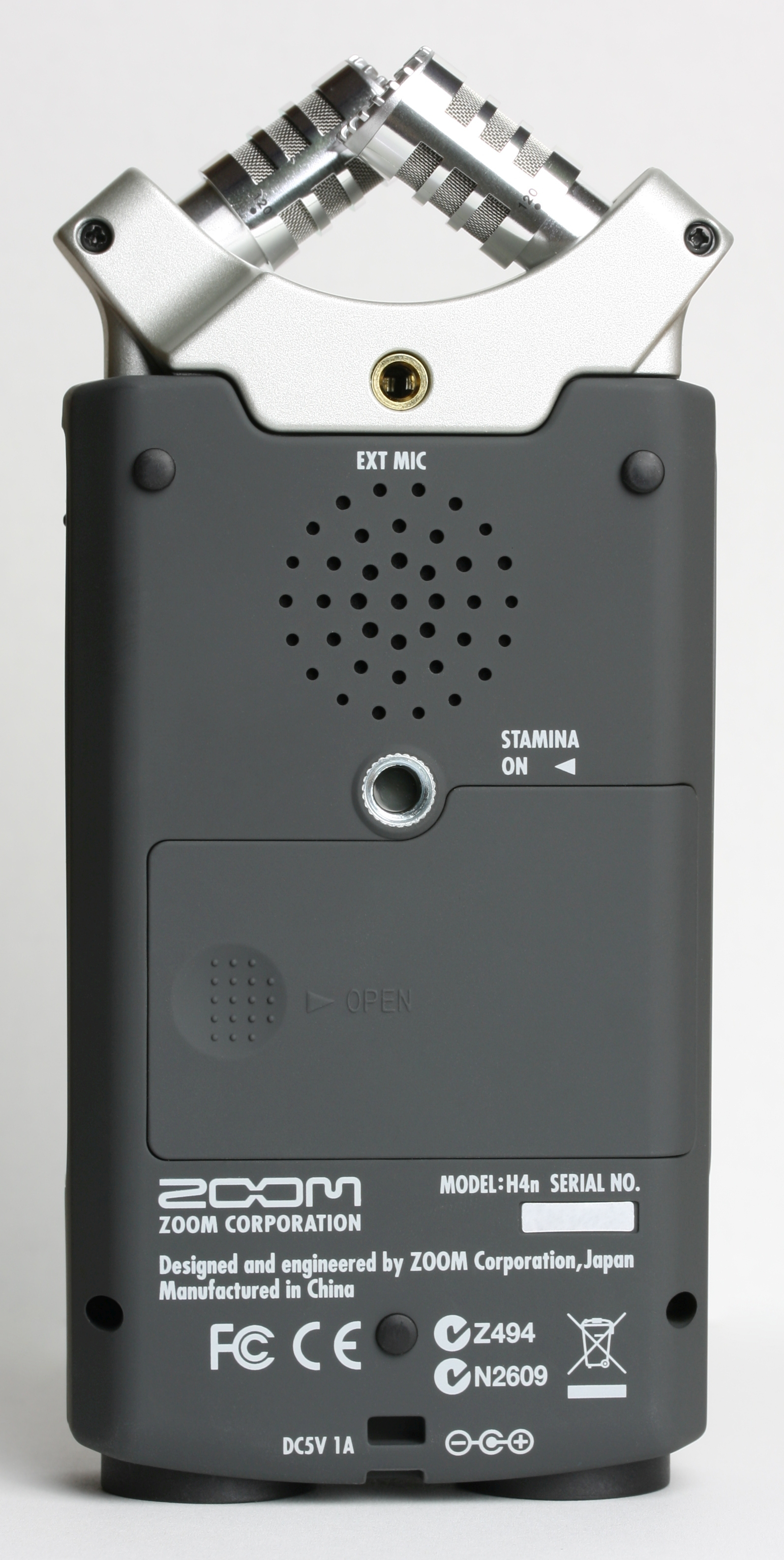
The recorder's back side

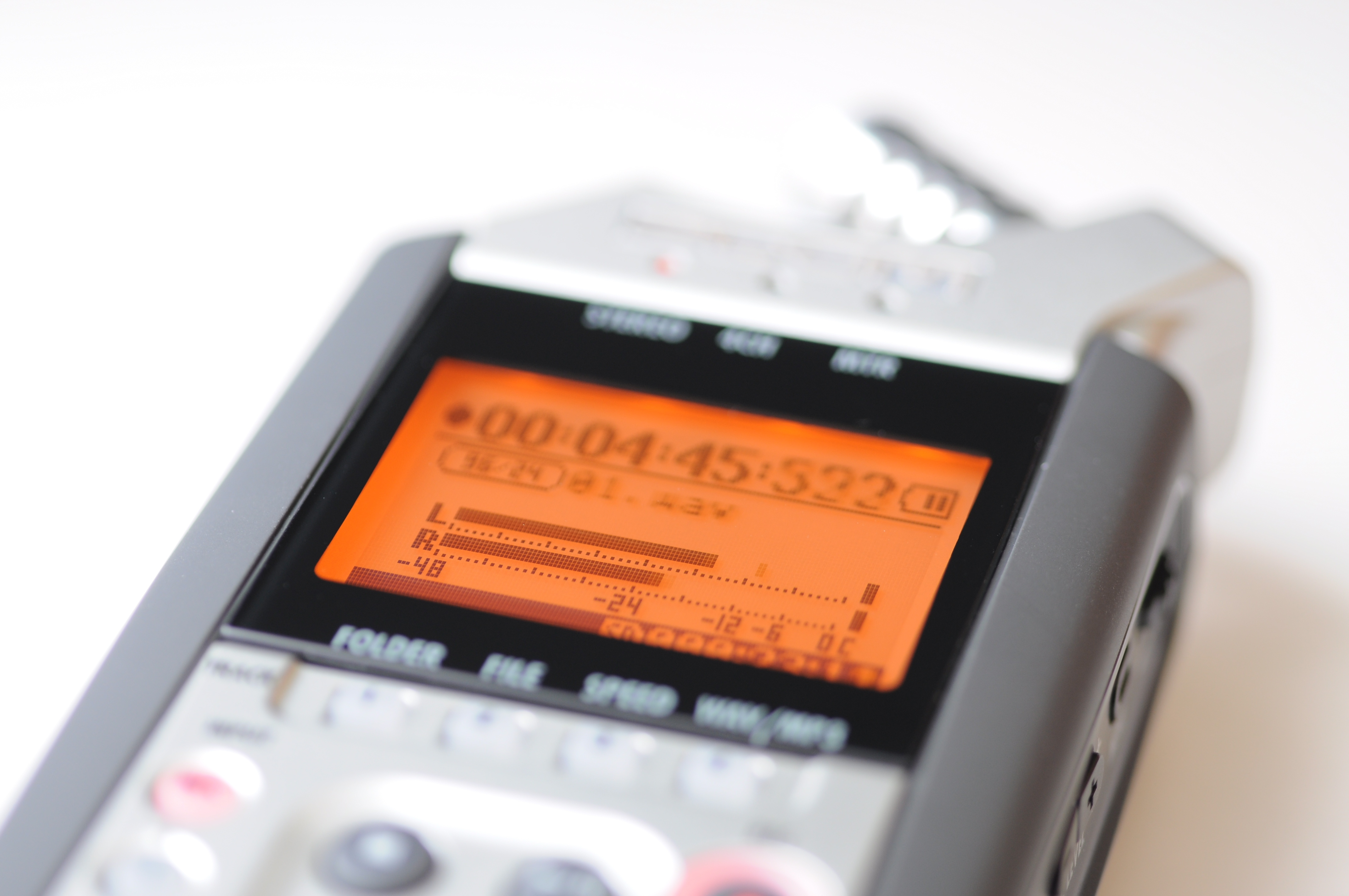
A closeup of the Zoom H4n with its interface

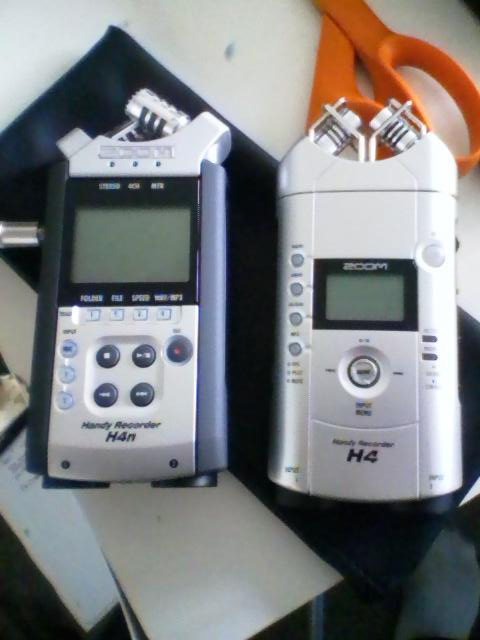
The Zoom H4n on the left and the older Zoom H4 on the right

A video for the Wikimedia Foundation, audio recorded using the Zoom H4n (visible at 1:34)

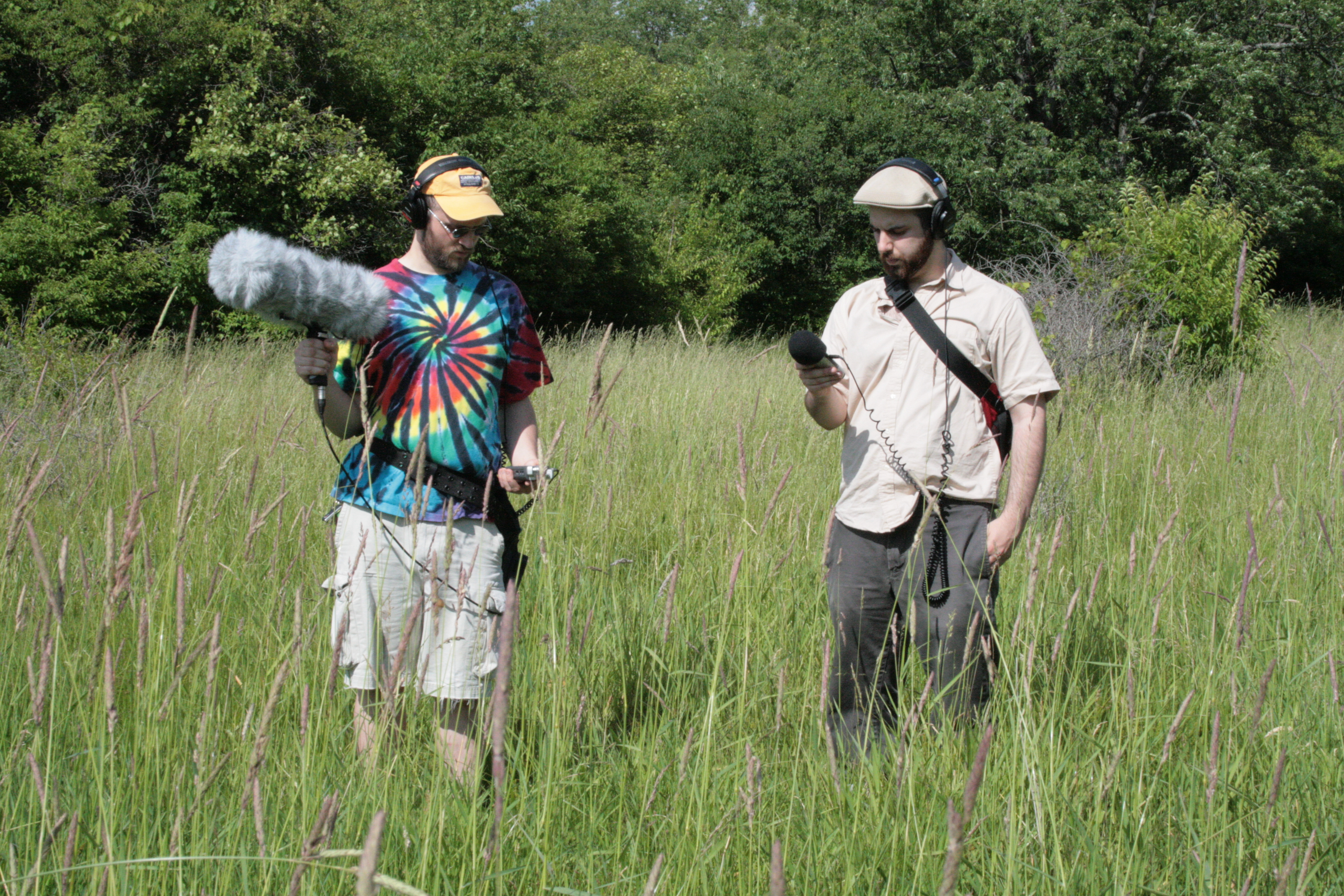
Two individuals recording. The one on the left is using a Zoom H4n with an external mic (and windscreen) plugged into one of the XLR inputs. The one on the right is using a Zoom H4.

== See also ==
- Zoom H2n
- Zoom H5
- Zoom H2 Handy Recorder
