= H2N =

The molecular formula H_{2}N may refer to:

- Amino group (H_{2}N–)
- Amino radical (H_{2}N^{•})
- Azanide (H_{2}N^{−})
- Nitrenium ion (H_{2}N^{+}), or aminylium ion

H2N may also refer to the Zoom H2n Handy Recorder
