= Leya (musicians) =

New York based musical group

Leya, stylized as LEYA, is the New York based collaboration of harpist Marilu Donovan and violin/vocalist Adam Markiewicz.

== Career ==
LEYA have released two full-length albums. The Fool (2018) and Flood Dream (2020) were released on New York-based label NNA Tapes.

LEYA's work has earned acclaim from notable publications including Pitchfork, Document Journal, i-D, Noisey, and The New York Times. Reviewing their second album for Pitchfork, contributor Jonathan Williger described the project: "The duo traverses the art world and DIY noise scenes, and their music revels in the tension between elegance and disquiet, subverting the stereotypes associated with their chosen instruments. It can sound equally gorgeous or unsettling, depending on mindset and circumstance; it asks more questions than it answers."

In 2018, the group wrote and performed a full-length soundtrack to "I Love You," a PornHub-produced erotic film directed by American rapper Brooke Candy that also features the duo as actors. In 2019, LEYA released Angel Lust, a collaborative EP with Eartheater via PAN. In 2022, LEYA released a collaborative mixtape project called Eyeline, which featured contributions from Julie Byrne, Eartheater, Okay Kaya, Actress, Claire Rousay, James K, Deli Girls, Sunk Heaven, and Martha Skye Murphy. Previous singles and remixes have seen the group paired with Liturgy, Drew McDowall (Coil, Psychic TV), and Christina Vantzou.

LEYA have collaborated with fashion labels including Louis Vuitton, Acne Studios, Hood by Air, and CFDA Emerging Artist Winner Elena Velez. In dance they have collaborated with choreographer Lonnie Landon at Jacob’s Pillow. In visual art they have worked on a number of projects ranging from scoring work to a number of public art installations around the US.

== Discography ==
Studio Albums

- The Fool (NNA Tapes, 2018)
- Flood Dream (NNA Tapes, 2020)

EPs

- Angel Lust (PAN, 2019) (with Eartheater)
- I Forget Everything (NNA Tapes, 2024)
- I Remember Nothing (NNA Tapes, 2025)

Mixtapes

- Eyeline (NNA Tapes, 2022)

Collaborations & Remixes

- "Antigone" (with Liturgy) (2020)
- "Wave" (Actress Remix) (2020)
- "First Way" (Drew McDowall Remix) (2020)
- "barriers to love" (with Deli Girls) (2020)
- "ABBA/Mary" (Christina Vantzou Remix) (2021)
- "Concrete" (with Martha Skye Murphy) (2021)
- "Rorschach" (with Okay Kaya) (2022)
