= Claire Rousay =

Canadian-American musician and composer

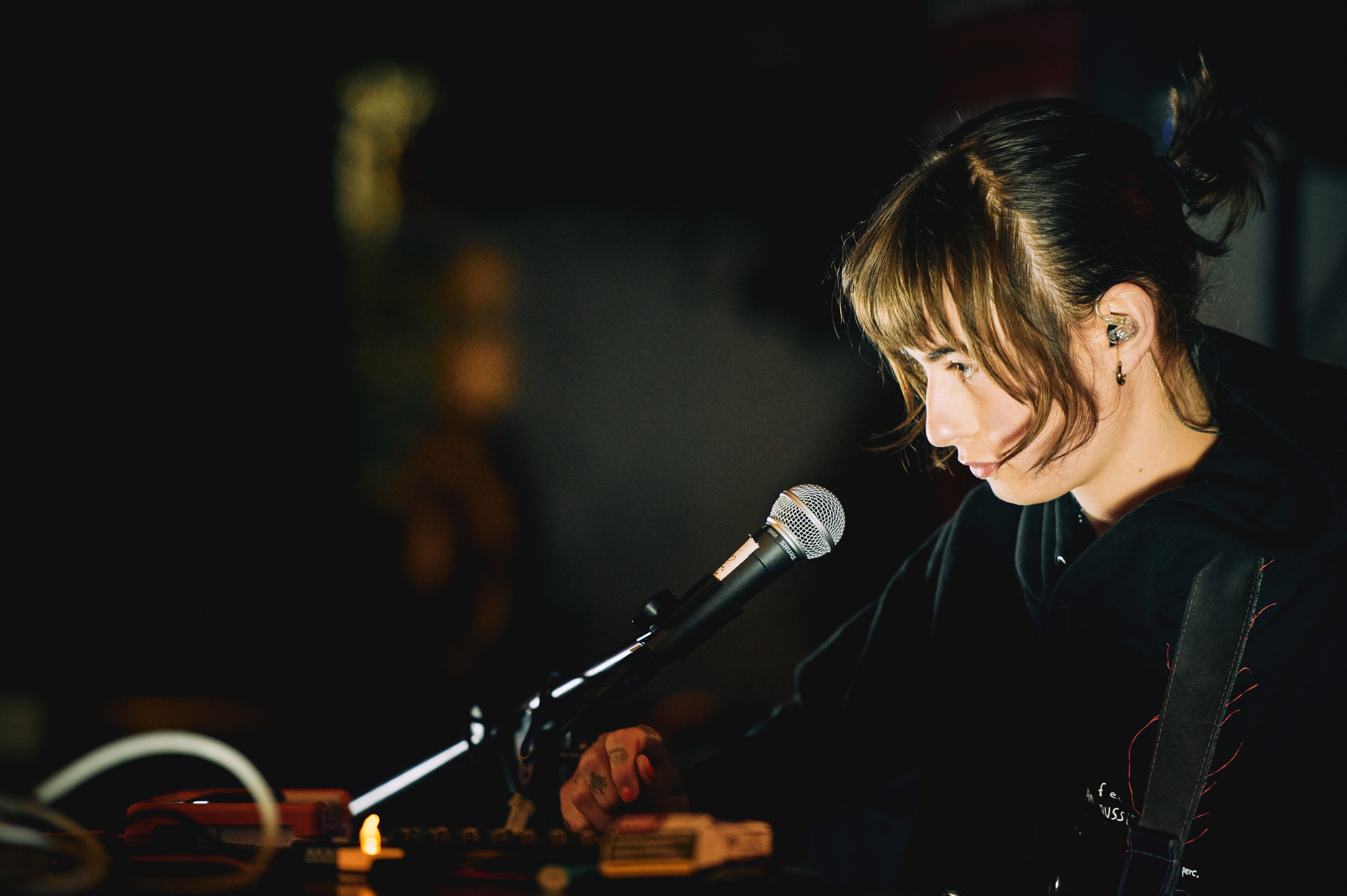
- Claire Rousay in 2023

Background information
- Born: Winnipeg, Manitoba, Canada
- Genres: Ambient; emo; experimental; musique concrète
- Years active: 2010s–present
- Labels: Astral Spirits; Shelter Press; Thrill Jockey
- Website: clairerousay.com

Claire Rousay (styled as claire rousay) is a Canadian-American experimental musician and composer based in Los Angeles. Rousay, who is currently signed with Thrill Jockey, is known for using field recordings to create musique concrète pieces.

== Early life ==
Rousay was born in Winnipeg, Manitoba, and moved to San Antonio, Texas, with her family when she was ten years old. Rousay's interest in music began at the age of three when she began piano lessons with her mother, a professional pianist. Rousay grew up in an Evangelical Christian household and played drums during church events until she distanced herself from Christianity. She dropped out of high school at the age of 15 and became a solo percussionist.

== Career ==
In 2020, Rousay released the album It Was Always Worth It via Longform Editions.

In 2021, she released A Softer Focus via American Dreams. The album was a collaboration with San Antonio-based visual artist Dani Toral, who first met Rousay in middle school. She also released Everything Perfect Is Already Here (2022).

Rousay has also collaborated with her best friend and fellow Texas-based experimental musician Mari Maurice, who performs under the name More Eaze. They have released numerous collaborative albums together.

In 2023, Rousay signed with American record label Thrill Jockey and released the album Sentiment in April 2024.

== Musical style ==
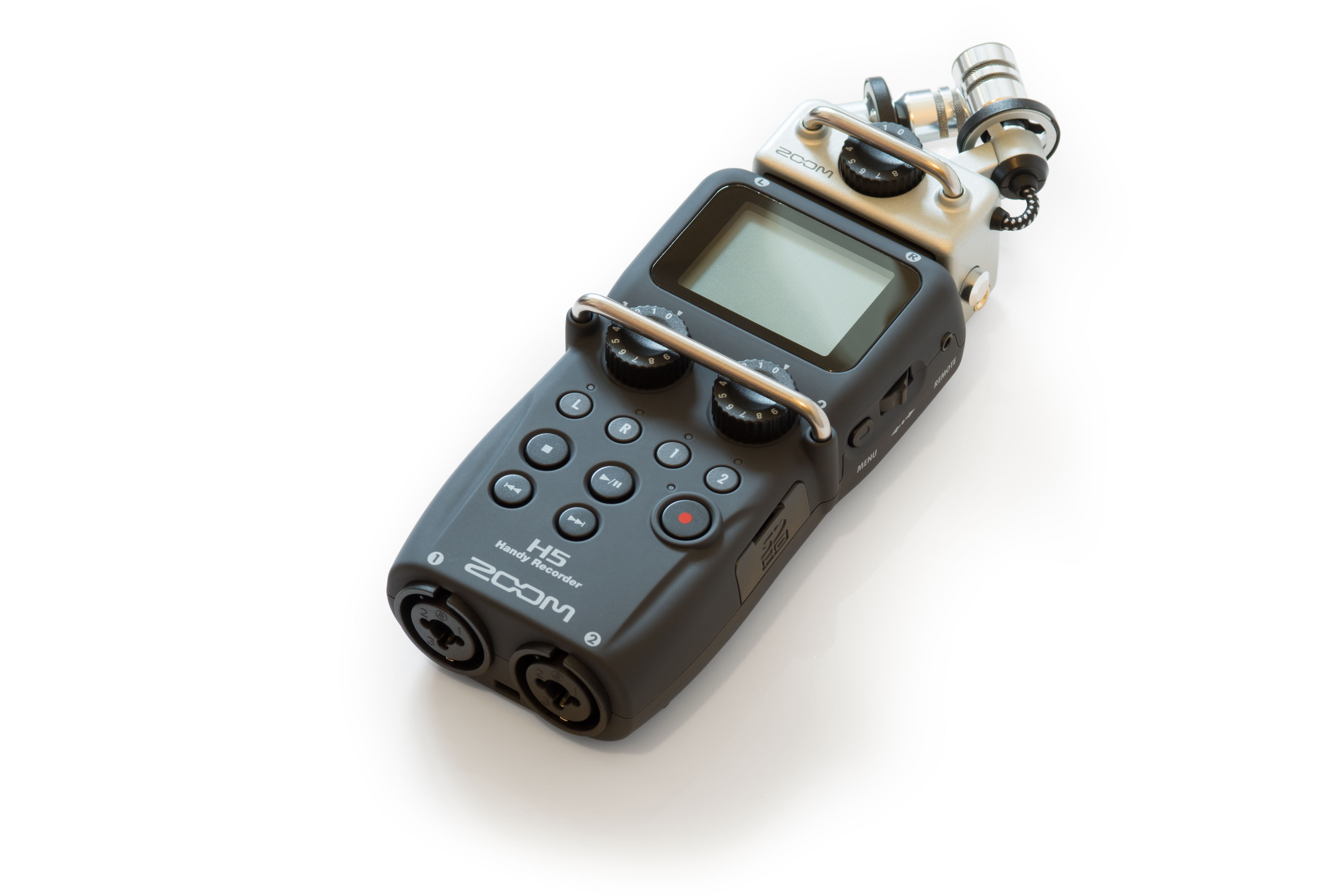
Zoom H5 Handy Recorder

Rousay uses a Zoom H5 Handy Recorder to record everyday sounds and uses them to create musique concrète pieces. Her music has been described as experimental and "emo ambient".

== Personal life ==
Rousay, who moved from San Antonio to Los Angeles in 2022, still maintains her Canadian citizenship. She hosts a weekly online show on NTS Radio.

In 2019, Rousay came out as a trans woman. The proceeds of her 2022 album Wouldn't Have to Hurt were donated to The Trevor Project. She also has a dog named Banana.

== Discography ==
=== Studio albums ===
Title	Album details
Blip	Released: April 13, 2017; Label: Mended Dreams; Formats: Digital download, streaming
Several Erasures	Released: April 19, 2019; Label: Already Dead; Formats: Digital download, streaming
Aerophobia	Released: June 21, 2019; Label: Astral Spirits; Formats: Digital download, streaming
T4t	Released: October 22, 2019; Label: No Rent; Formats: Digital download, streaming
Friends	Released: November 17, 2019; Label: Mended Dreams, Never Anything; Formats: Cassette, digital download, streaming
If I Don't Let Myself Be Happy Now Then When? (with More Eaze)	Released: March 13, 2020; Label: Mondoj; Formats: LP, cassette, digital download, streaming
Specifically the Water (with Alex Cunningham)	Released: April 17, 2020; Label: Monofonus Press, Astral Spirits; Formats: CD, cassette, digital download, streaming
A Heavenly Touch	Released: April 17, 2020; Label: Already Dead, Mended Dreams; Formats: LP, cassette, digital download, streaming
I'll Give You All of My Love	Released: May 1, 2020; Label: Mended Dreams; Formats: Digital download, streaming
Both	Released: August 28, 2020; Label: Second Editions; Formats: LP, digital download, streaming
A Softer Focus	Released: April 9, 2021; Label: American Dreams; Formats: LP, digital download, streaming
An Afternoon Whine (with More Eaze)	Released: July 23, 2021; Label: Ecstatic Recordings; Formats: LP, digital download, streaming
Never Stop Texting Me (with More Eaze)	Released: February 11, 2022; Label: Orange Milk; Formats: LP, cassette, digital download, streaming
Everything Perfect Is Already Here	Released: April 22, 2022; Label: Shelter Press; Formats: LP, CD, digital download, streaming
Wouldn't Have to Hurt	Released: September 14, 2022; Label: Mended Dreams; Formats: Cassette, digital download, streaming
A Very Busy Social Life (with Anne-F Jacques)	Released: December 16, 2022; Label: Mended Dreams; Formats: Cassette, digital download, streaming
Anything You Can Do... (with Jacob Wick)	Released: December 16, 2022; Label: Mended Dreams; Formats: Digital download, streaming
Sentiment	Released: April 19, 2024; Label: Thrill Jockey; Formats: LP, CD, digital download, streaming
The Bloody Lady	Released: November 8, 2024; Label: Thrill Jockey; Formats: LP, CD, digital download, streaming
No Floor (with More Eaze)	Released: March 21, 2025; Label: Thrill Jockey; Formats: LP, digital download, streaming
A Little Death	Released: October 31, 2025; Label: Thrill Jockey; Formats: LP, CD, digital download, streaming
Hotel Room (with Martyna Basta)	Released: September 25, 2026; Label: Unsound; Formats: LP, digital download, streaming

=== EPs ===
Title	EP details
Divide	Released: April 20, 2018; Label: Mended Dreams
Neuter	Released: November 2, 2018; Label: Mended Dreams
It Is Just So Much More Difficult	Released: April 15, 2019; Label: Falt, Mended Dreams
A Moment in St Louis and a Moment at the Beach	Released: July 17, 2019; Label: Mended Dreams
Live at Elastic Arts (with Carol Genetti)	Released: July 3, 2020; Label: Astral Editions
</3 (with More Eaze)	Released: July 17, 2020; Label: New Computer Girls
It Was Always Worth It	Released: October 14, 2020; Label: Longform Editions
Split (with More Eaze and Wind Tide)	Released: November 16, 2020; Label: Full Spectrum
Live	Released: July 2, 2021; Label: American Dreams
A Crying Poem (with More Eaze and Bloodz Boi)	Released: August 5, 2022; Label: Orange Milk
17 Roles (All Mapped Out)	Released: September 29, 2022; Label: Shelter Press
Distance Therapy	Released: October 12, 2022; Label: Longform Editions
Claire Rousay (Audiotree Live)	Released: September 12, 2024; Label: Audiotree

=== Singles ===
Title	Year	Album
"Tuufuhhoowaah / Bday Shots"	2020	Non-album single
"Kyle" (with More Eaze)	2020	Never Stop Texting Me
"Peak Chroma"	2021	A Softer Focus
"Discrete (The Market)"	2021	A Softer Focus
"Same" (with More Eaze)	2022	Never Stop Texting Me
"Hands" (with More Eaze)	2022	Never Stop Texting Me
"Stairs" (with More Eaze)	2022	Never Stop Texting Me
"Overcoast" (with More Eaze & Bloodz Boi)	2022	A Crying Poem
"Deceiver" (with Helena Deland)	2023	Non-album singles
"Sigh In My Ear"	2023	Non-album singles
"Head"	2024	Sentiment
"Ily2" (featuring Hand Habits)	2024	Sentiment
"It Could Be Anything"	2024	Sentiment
"Lover's Spit Plays in the Background"	2024	Sentiment
"III"	2024	The Bloody Lady
"VIII"	2024	The Bloody Lady
"How Sweet I Roamed" (with Jeff Tweedy)	2024	Transa
"Limelight, Illegally" (with More Eaze)	2024	No Floor
"Kinda Tropical" (with More Eaze)	2025	No Floor
"Lowcountry" (with More Eaze)	2025	No Floor
