= No Floor =

Studio album by More Eaze and Claire Rousay
- Released: March 21, 2025
- Length: 30:55
- Label: Thrill Jockey
- Producers: More Eaze; Claire Rousay

More Eaze chronology
Paris Paris, Texas Texas (2024)	No Floor (2025)

Claire Rousay chronology
The Bloody Lady (2024)	No Floor (2025)	A Little Death (2025)

Singles from No Floor
- 1. "Limelight, Illegally" Released: December 19, 2024; 2. "Lowcountry" Released: February 26, 2025

No Floor is a collaborative album by American composer Mari "More Eaze" Maurice and Canadian-American experimental musician Claire Rousay. It was released March 21, 2025, by Thrill Jockey.

== Background ==
Consisting of five songs, No Floor is the first joint album by long-time collaborators, Eaze and Rousay, since their debut project in 2020, If I Don't Let Myself Be Happy Now Then When.

It was first announced on December 19, 2024, followed by the release of its lead single, "Limelight, Illegally". The second single, "Lowcountry", was released on February 26, 2025.

== Reception ==
Professional ratings
Aggregate scores
Source	Rating
Metacritic	83/100
Review scores
Source	Rating
AllMusic	4/5 stars
Pitchfork	7.6/10
PopMatters	8/10

According to the review aggregator Metacritic, No Floor received "universal acclaim" based on a weighted average score of 83 out of 100 from 6 critic scores.

In its review of No Floor, AllMusic wrote "Though most of the album doesn't feature the manipulated field recordings and found sounds often used in both artists' music, it still feels very localized and personal, as if they're interpreting various environments and locations through their instruments rather than direct sampling."

Clash described it as "a five-track exploration of ethereal Americana atmospheres, a dose of audio painting that combines two very distinctive artists." British online magazine The Quietus noted that "the album as a whole feels like a dream that’s always at risk of being interrupted by reality, where pure bliss is just out of reach."

Theatrical website BroadwayWorld commented about the theme of the album, stating "Eschewing the auto-tune inflected pop-psychedelia and found sounds of their previous collaborations, No Floor is collage music as pastoral melancholia, a lush tour into their own version of Americana." Pitchfork gave the album a rating of 7.6 out of 10, and described it as "an instrumental record built around collaged electro-acoustic sounds that tells the story of their friendship through portraits of bars and venues—memorialized in the track titles—that they’ve visited."

=== Accolades ===
Year-end lists for No Floor
Publication	List	Rank	Ref.
AllMusic	Favorite Electronic Albums	—	

== Track listing ==
All tracks are written by More Eaze and Claire Rousay.

No Floor track listing
No.	Title	Length
1.	"Hopfields"	8:16
2.	"Kinda Tropical"	3:16
3.	"The Applebees Outside Kalamazoo, Michigan"	5:57
4.	"Limelight, Illegally"	6:38
5.	"Lowcountry"	6:48
Total length:		30:55

== Personnel ==
- More Eaze – performance, production, mixing
- Claire Rousay – performance
- Andrew Weathers – mastering
- Grace Herndon – photography
- Daniel Castrejón – design
