= Zoom H4 Handy Recorder =

Digital recording device

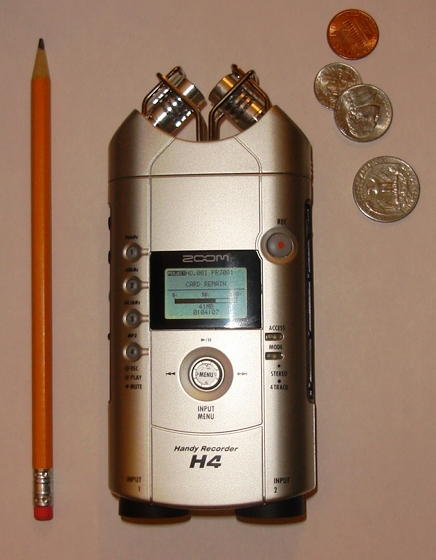
The H4 is shorter than a pencil

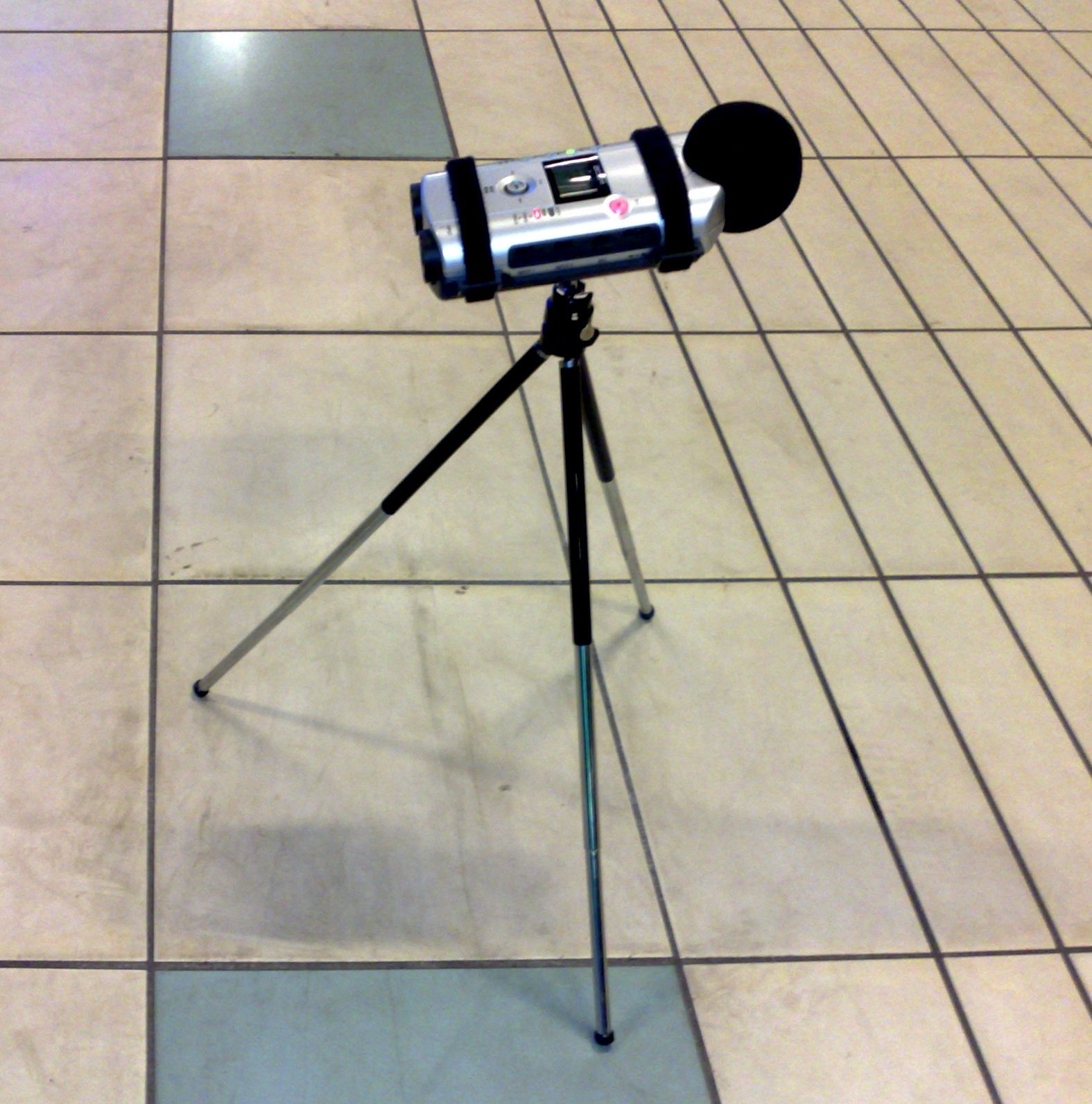
Field recording with H4 on a simple tripod

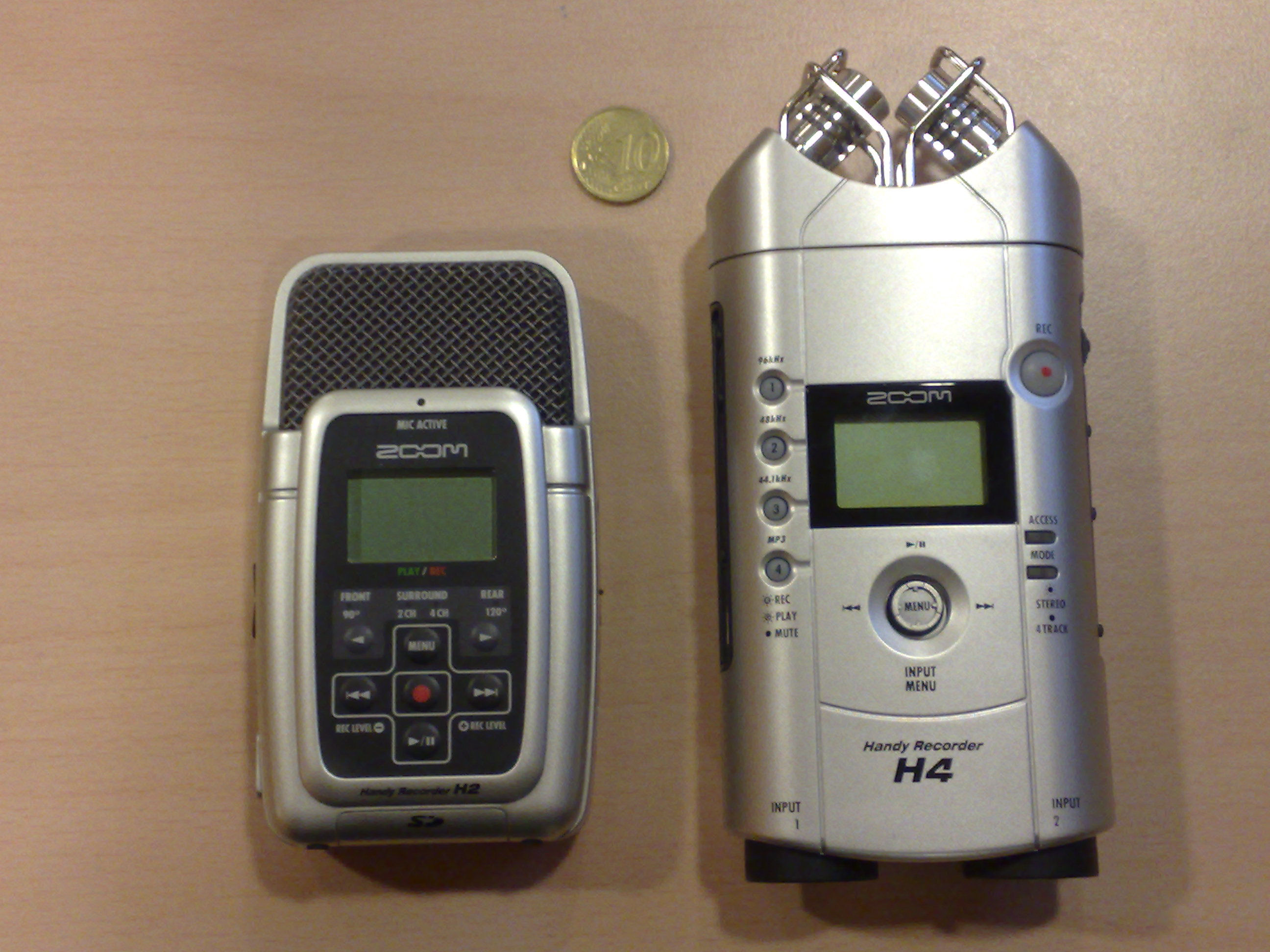
H2 and H4 with 10 eurocents for scale

The H4 Handy Recorder is a handheld digital audio recorder from Zoom, featuring built-in condenser microphones in an X-Y stereo pattern, priced from around US$280 depending upon memory capacity as of 2011.

Recordings are stored on an SD card (128 MB supplied), or via a USB cable to a computer running digital audio workstation software (Cubase LE supplied).

== Applications and recording formats ==
The H4 can record in stereo or four-track mode. In stereo mode WAV or compressed (MP3) files may be made. A 2 GB card will store 95 hours of speech-quality or 3 hours of CD-quality recording. With device firmware from version 2.0, SDHC cards up to 32 GB in size are supported, storing 16 hours at the highest-quality setting (uncompressed PCM WAV, 24 bit, 96 kHz, stereo).

Basic four-track recordings can be made in the field with the built-in microphones and two additional input ports which accept external signal sources via XLR or 1/4-inch connectors.

== Stereo mode ==
In stereo mode, the user has a wide choice of sound quality, with lower quality requiring less storage space. Only 44.1 kHz 16-bit recordings can be imported into four-track mode. All stereo recordings share a single folder, and on playback are sequenced as one continuous output stream with no pause between files.

Stereo recording can use the built-in microphones or external input via 1/4-inch or XLR plugs.

== 4-track mode ==
Four-track recordings can be made of one or two tracks at a time. When recording in stereo, only tracks 1 and 2, or 3 and 4, can be chosen. Four-track recordings are limited to 16-bit/44.1 kHz WAV files. WAV recordings made in stereo mode can be imported into a project folder.

When recording on one or two tracks, the other tracks may be played back simultaneously (see multi-track recording). Each track can be individually panned, to create a stereo image.

Any or all tracks can be mixed down to a stereo bounce file. This can be the last step in mixing, or an intermediate step to free up other tracks.

== Effects ==
The H4 incorporates a 32-bit DSP that provides various effects as well as modelling of different types of microphone and guitar amplifiers. Up to 60 effects patches can be stored.

== Internal clock issue ==
It has been reported that all H4 recorders have a serious flaw: the internal clock is not precise, with a typical error of a few seconds per hour. As a result, recorded audio is out of sync with other devices (e.g., camcorders) and has to be stretched in order to achieve synchronization.

== See also ==
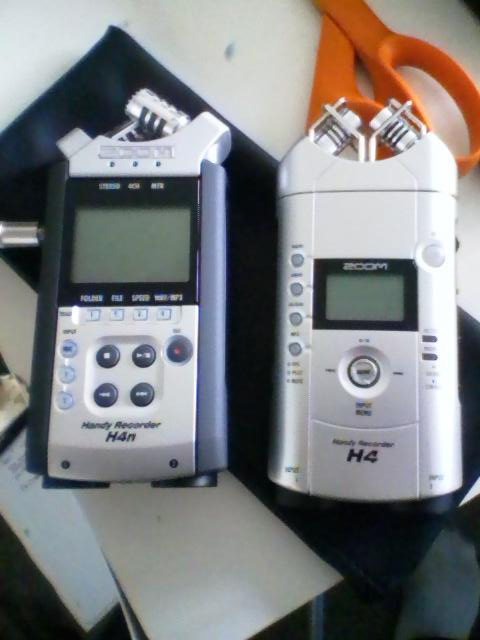
The Zoom H4 on the right and the newer Zoom H4n on the left

- Zoom H2 Handy Recorder
- Zoom H4n
