= Zoom HD8 and HD16 =

Zoom HD8 and HD16 are digital multitrack recording devices manufactured by Zoom Corporation. HD8 and HD16 were presented at the Winter NAMM Show in 2007 as the successor of MRS-1608. The HD8 and HD16 models have been discontinued in December 2009.

== Differences between HD8 and HD16 ==
HD8 and HD16 have similar technical characteristics. The main differences between the models are:

- HD8 has 8 tracks (6 mono and 1 stereo faders), HD16 has 16 tracks (8 mono and 4 stereo faders).
- HD8 can record 2 track at once, while HD16 can record 8 tracks at once.
- HD16 has an effect send bus.

== File Formats ==
HD8/16 stores digital audio as monaural Waveform Audio File Format files. Stereo tracks are recorded as two monaural files.

Digital audio can be imported into HD8/16 in Audio Interchange File Format (AIFF) or Waveform Audio File Format (WAV).

MIDI files can be imported as Format 0 Standard MIDI File (SMF), then the unit can play the file with internal instruments or drive an external MIDI unit.
