= Zoom Corporation =

Japanese audio company

- Native name: 株式会社ズーム
- Romanized name: Zoom Corporation
- Type: Public
- Traded as: TYO: 6694
- Industry: Audio Equipment
- Founded: September 9, 1983 (43 years ago)
- Headquarters: Kanda-Surugadai, Chiyoda, Tokyo, Japan
- Key people: Shunsuke Kudoh (Representative Director and CEO)
- Products: Electronic devices for music
- Website: zoom.co.jp

Zoom Corporation is a Japan-based audio company whose main business is the design and development of electronic devices for music. The company’s products are sold worldwide. Established in 1983, the company is listed on the JASDAQ market of the Tokyo Stock Exchange.

== Corporate history ==
Zoom Corporation was founded in Tokyo in 1983 and in 2004, established ZOOM HK LTD as a logistics base in Hong Kong. In 2009, it set up ZOOM Dongguan Corporation (China) as a quality control operation; 2013, formed ZOOM North America, LLC (US) as a distribution base; 2017, listed on Tokyo Stock Exchange JASDAQ (Standard); In 2018, acquired shares of Mogar Music S.p.A. (Italy) (current consolidated subsidiary Mogar Music S.r.l.), making it a subsidiary as a distribution center; and in 2020, acquired all shares of ZOOM North America, LLC (US), making it a wholly owned subsidiary; 2020, ZOOM UK Distribution LTD excluded as equity method affiliate; 2021, acquired all shares of Hook Up, Inc. in Japan, making it a wholly owned subsidiary.

== Major Product Categories ==
In the fiscal year ended December 31, 2020, Zoom Corporation's main product categories accounted for the following percentages of sales: Handy Audio Recorders (HAR), 43%; Digital Mixers / Multitrack Recorders (DMX/MTR), 13%; Multi Effects (MFX), 12%; Handy Video Recorders (HVR), 10%; Professional Field Recorders (PFR) 7%; other 15%.

== Products ==
=== Effect processors ===
==== Guitar effect processors ====
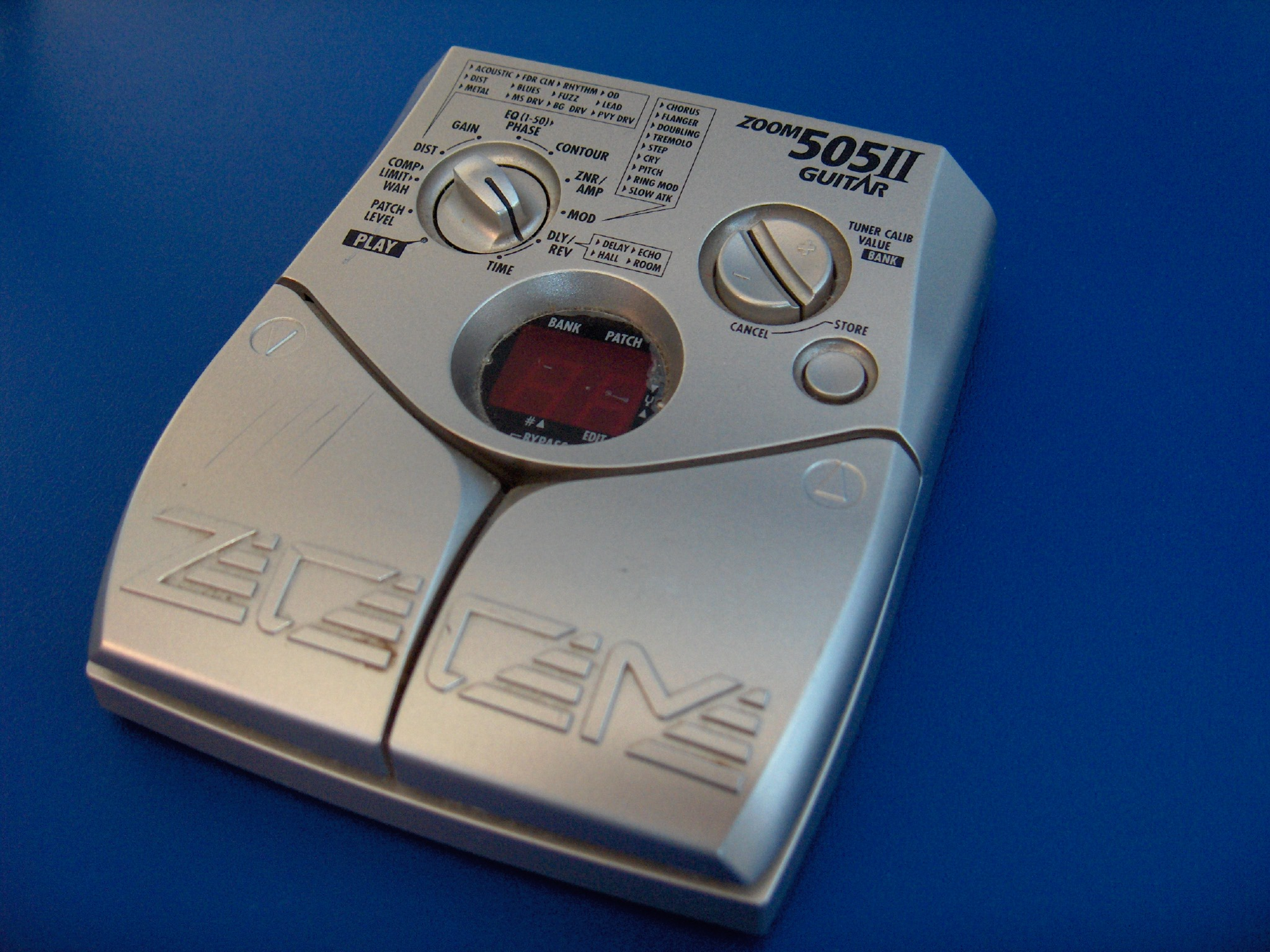
Zoom 505 II

- G1
- G1X
- G1Next
- G1XNext
- G1 Four
- G1X Four
- G1u
- G1on
- G1Xon
- G2
- G2.1u
- G2Nu
- G2.1Nu
- G3/G3X
- G5
- G7.1ut
- G9.2tt
- G11
- GFX-1
- GFX-3
- GFX-4
- GFX-5
- GFX-8
- GM-200
- MS-100BT
- MS-50G
- MS-70CDR
- ZFX
- 503
- 505
- 505II
- 508
- 606
- 606II
- 707
- 707II
- 1010
- 2020
- 3000S
- 3030
- 4040
- 8080
- 9000s
- 9002
- 9002 Artist's Edition
- 9030
- 9050S
- 9120
- 9150

===== GFX-8 =====
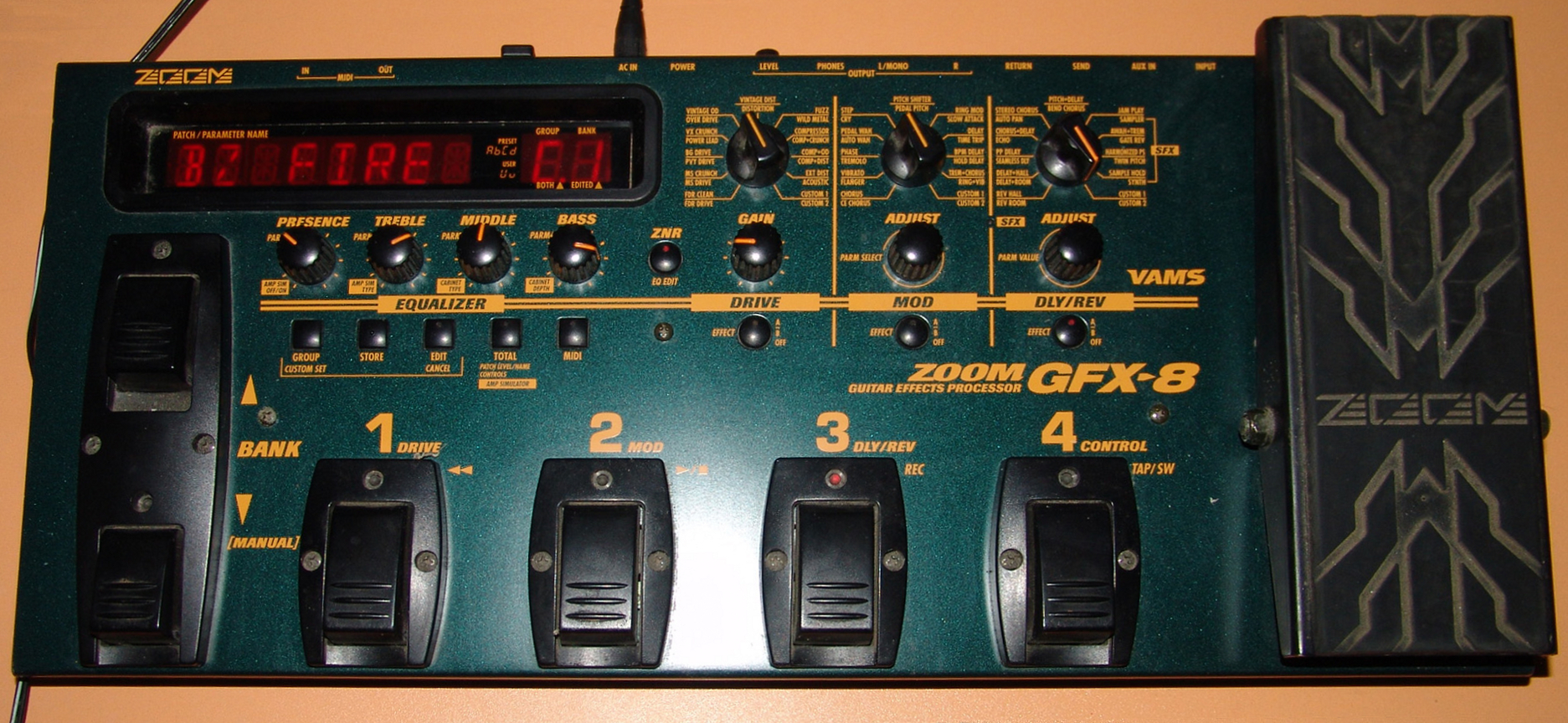
Zoom GFX-8

At the time it was released, the GFX-8 was the flagship of the Zoom GFX series.

It has a solid steel dark green body with an opto-based pedal on the right and red LED display on the top left. It uses the Variable Architecture Modeling System (V.A.M.S) technology. In general, there are three main internal modules: for drive, for modulation and for delay. The unit allows a high level of distortion customization by using specialized software. It also allows the use of external distortion. The technology used in the unit does not allow full reordering of the effects but allows some of modulation effects like wah and phaser to be connected before or after the drive module. The drive module implements dynamic related effects like compressor, overdrive, distortion and fuzz. After the drive module, the noise gate module called ZNR (ZOOM Noise Reduction) is connected, followed by a parametric equalizer (presence, treble, middle, bass). The amp simulation module is connected next and allows various types of guitar amplifier simulations. The modulation module implements effects like wah, phaser, chorus, ring modulator, tremolo, vibrato, flanger and pitch shifter. The delay module is used to implement delay and reverb effects. Effects that require high processing power use modulation and delay module together. One such effect is the jam play effect, which allows, for example, a guitar player to play a rhythm guitar part and then play a solo part over it. The unit design is oriented toward ease of use by providing more knobs than usually found on such units, thus making the unit look more like a chain of effect boxes instead of the typical effect processor with a "few knobs many functions" type design. The unit has mature MIDI capabilities, allowing both control from an external sequencer or using the unit as a MIDI controller. The MIDI OUT can be configured to act as MIDI THRU.

==== Bass guitar effect processors ====
- 506
- 506II
- 607
- 708II
- B1
- B1x
- B1on
- B1Xon
- B2
- B2.1u
- B2 Four
- B3
- B3n
- B6
- B9.1ut
- MS-60B
- MS-60B+

==== Acoustic guitar effect processors ====
- 504
- 504II
- A2
- A2.1u
- A3

==== Studio rack mountable effect processors ====
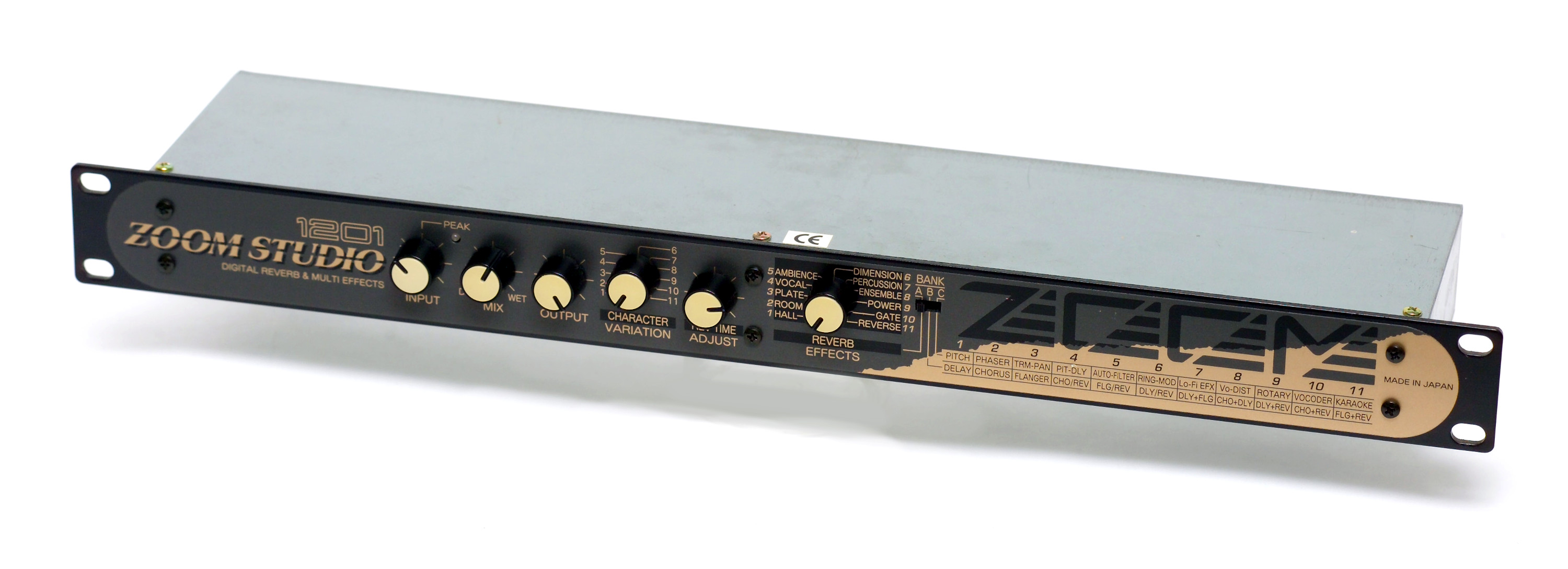
Zoom Studio 1201

- RFX-2200
- RFX-2000
- RFX-1100
- RFX-1000
- Zoom Studio 1201
- Zoom Studio 1202
- Zoom Studio 1204
- 9010
- 9200

=== Digital recorders ===
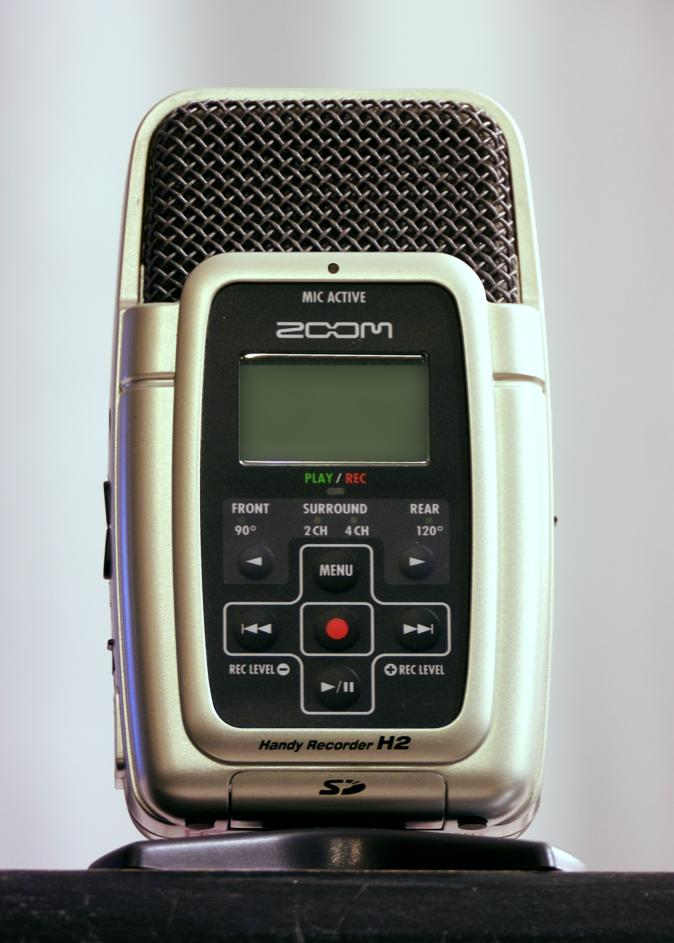
Zoom H2 digital recorder

- H1 Handy Recorder
- H1n Handy Recorder
- H2 Handy Recorder
- H2n Handy Recorder
- H3-VR
- H4 Handy Recorder
- H4n Handy Recorder
- H5 Handy Recorder
- H6 Handy Recorder
- F1-SP / F1-LP Field Recorder
- F2 / F2-BT Field Recorder

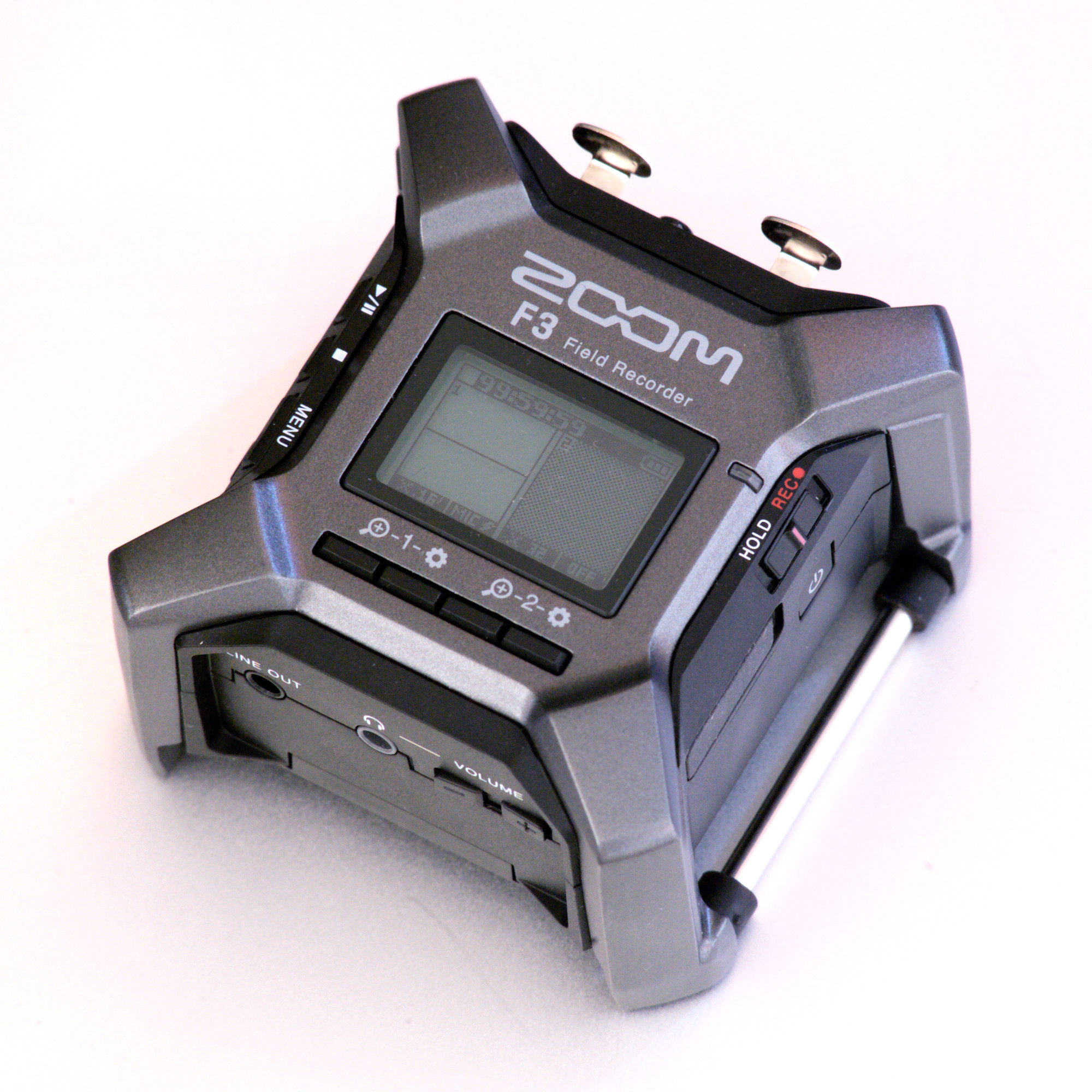
Zoom F3 digital recorder

- F3 Field Recorder
- F4 Field Recorder
- F6 Field Recorder
- F8 Field Recorder
- F8n Field Recorder
- MRS-1608
- MRS-1266
- MRS-1044
- MRS-802
- MRS-8
- MRS-4
- PS-04
- PS-02
- HD8 / HD8CD
- HD16 / HD16CD
- R8
- R16
- R24
- Q2HD
- Q3
- Q3HD
- Q4
- Q4n
- Q8HD

=== Rhythm machines ===
- RT-123
- RT-223
- RT-323
- RT-234
- MRT-3
- MRT-3b
- SB-246
- ST-224

a Zoom ARQ AR-48 being used

- ARQ AR-48
- ARQ AR-96

=== Guitar amplifiers ===
- FIRE-36M
- FIRE-18M
- FIRE-36
- FIRE-18
- FIRE-7010

=== Audio interfaces ===
- TAC-2
- TAC-2R
- TAC-8
- UAC-2
- UAC-8
- AMS-22
- AMS-24
- AMS-44
