= Never Stop Texting Me =

Studio album by Claire Rousay and More Eaze
- Released: February 11, 2022
- Genres: Hyperpop; emo; pop
- Length: 30:24
- Label: Orange Milk

Claire Rousay chronology
An Afternoon Whine (2021)	Never Stop Texting Me (2022)	Everything Perfect Is Already Here (2022)

More Eaze chronology
The Heart Pumps Kool-Aid (2021)	Never Stop Texting Me (2022)	Oneiric (2022)

Singles from Never Stop Texting Me
- 1. "Kyle" Released: November 27, 2020; 2. "Same" / "Hands" Released: January 1, 2022; 3. "Stairs" Released: January 28, 2022

Never Stop Texting Me is a collaborative studio album by experimental musicians Claire Rousay and More Eaze. It was released on February 11, 2022, by Orange Milk Records. Described as a hyperpop, emo, and pop album, it was noted as a stylistic departure from Eaze and Rousay's traditional ambient and drone music. During production, Eaze and Rousay took alternating roles, and Eaze described it as "for every part of the fucking [LGBTQ] acronym." The album also heavily utilizes Auto-Tune and lyrically revolves around repeatedly making futile attempts at connection. Upon its release, Never Stop Texting Me received generally positive reviews from critics.

== Background and production ==
The Texas-based experimental musicians Eaze, from Austin, and Rousay, then based in San Antonio, first met as bandmates after the band's prospective drummer left and suggested Rousay as a replacement. They soon after began frequently collaborating; their previous collaborative album, An Afternoon Whine, was released in summer of 2021. (Note: The Fader describes An Afternoon Whine as Eaze and Rousay's first collaborative studio album, while Bandcamp Daily states it is their second. Pitchfork also names the duo's 2020 album If I Don't Let Myself Be Happy Now Then When as their first.)

The album is dominated by rugged production and quality, which Zhang noted was a large part of the album's appeal. According to Eaze, she and Rousay wanted Never Stop Texting Me "to sound beamed in by aliens" and made it "for every part of the fucking [LGBTQ] acronym." The album was inspired by The Black Eyed Peas and The Ann Steel Album, a sound collage record layered with saxophones and various field recordings. Eaze and Rousay took alternating roles in producing songs; one would start the song, and the other would finish it. They would also write their lyrics separately and later combine them to create a narrative structure. The cover of Never Stop Texting Me was designed by Orange Milk co-founder Seth Graham.

== Composition ==
=== Overview ===
Never Stop Texting Me is a hyperpop emo, and pop album with influences of emo rap, Midwest emo, pop-punk, chiptune, and art pop. The album contains power ballads and maudlin sing-alongs. As well, it heavily uses synthesizers likened to the art collective PC Music by Miloš Hroch of The Quietus, distorted guitars, and forceful percussion. Vocals throughout the album heavily utilize Auto-Tune; Cat Zhang of Pitchfork compared Rousay's voice to that of a Minion from the Despicable Me franchise, while Eaze maintains an airy falsetto throughout the album. Ted Davis of Stereogum described the songs as "exuberant." Never Stop Texting Me was considered a stylistic shift from both Eaze and Rousay, who traditionally made ambient and drone; however, Zhang felt that the switch was not "ultimately that jarring." The overarching theme of the album revolves around repeatedly making futile attempts at connection, with much of the lyrical content discussing infatuations, breakups, and leisure time.

=== Tracks ===
The opening track of Never Stop Texting Me is "Same", which begins with grumbling static and dripping water, sounds that Zhang likened to a spa. The sounds then fade away and are replaced by a robotic voice asking questions while digitized chimes play sporadically. It is followed with "Hands", which contains electric guitar strumming layered with dense synthesizers. The third track, "Kyle", is a hyperpop song featuring trap instrumentation and bright synthesizers. "iPhone2" contains acoustic plucking and intensifying chords; its lyrical content consists of humorous dialogue between two people who own different generations of smartphones. One expresses the desire to one day be able to afford a new phone, while the other displays insecurity about owning a newer-generation phone, fearing that having one would isolate themselves. The song was compared to Lil Peep and Bladee by Ted Davis of Stereogum. The keys on "iPhone2" were compared to Justin Bieber ballads by J. Edward Keyes of Bandcamp Daily.

"Stairs" is an electronica song; Matt Mitchell of Paste described it as "poetic" and "uber-consumable." The sixth track, "Camille", utilizes the sound of crinkling wrappers. It is followed with "Missed", contains guest appearances from Chinese rapper Bloodz Boi and How to Dress Well, the album's only features and coordinated through Instagram. The track begins with a minute of static and deep rumbling before the melody fades in. The eighth track "Art" was described by Zhang as "a Lonely Island parody for ambient hotshots." The track's instrumental contains guitar and flutes with melodramatic production. The lyrical content of "Art" describes Eaze and Rousay's creative process and lifestyle as niche musicians, making a reference to organist Kali Malone in the chorus ("We're on that Kali Malone shit") and boasting about their routine ("Cashing out PayPal because we just got paid / Ordering Uber Eats with cash from Bandcamp Day"). The ninth track, "Arms", contains waves of cordial synthesizers. The closing track of Never Stop Texting Me is "Floor Pt2", which combines trap percussion with arpeggiated keys.

== Release and reception ==
Professional ratings
Review scores
Source	Rating
Pitchfork	6.7/10

The third track, "Kyle", was released as a single on November 27, 2020, through Eaze and Rousay's label New Computer Girls Ltd. On January 1, coinciding with the album's announcement, Rousay and Eaze released the lead singles: "Same" and "Hands". The fifth track, "Stairs", was released as a single on January 28. Never Stop Texting Me was released on February 11, 2022, through Orange Milk Records.

Never Stop Texting Me received generally positive reviews from critics. Hroch, in a review for The Quietus, felt that hyperpop's stylistic maximalism meshed with the minimalism of Eaze and Rousay, despite their inherit contrast. Ted Davis of Stereogum described the album as Eaze and Rousay's "most fun endeavor to date." Keyes, writing for Bandcamp Daily, called it "a start-to-finish blast" and "inventive." In a review for Pitchfork, Zhang stated that although the album had "an indisputable charm," the individual tracks lacked "audaciousness and velocity," describing the production as "stiff and blocky." She also felt that the album was targeted more towards Millennials, in contrast to the Generation Z-dominated atmosphere of hyperpop. In September 2026, Paste included "Stairs" on their mid-decade list of the best songs of the 2020s and described it as the "centerpiece" to Never Stop Texting Me.

== Track listing ==
Never Stop Texting Me track listing
No.	Title	Length
1.	"Same"	3:39
2.	"Hands"	2:59
3.	"Kyle"	1:56
4.	"iPhone2"	2:36
5.	"Stairs"	3:21
6.	"Camille"	2:35
7.	"Missed" (featuring Bloodz Boi and How to Dress Well)	3:01
8.	"Art"	2:39
9.	"Arms"	4:23
10.	"Floor Pt2"	3:15
Total length:		30:24

== Credits ==
Credits adapted from Bandcamp.

- More Eaze – recording, audio mixing
- Claire Rousay – recording
- Alessio Natalizia – audio mastering
- Seth Graham – art, layout

== Notes and references ==
Notes
