= Zoom H5 Handy Recorder =

Digital recording device manufactured by Zoom Corporation

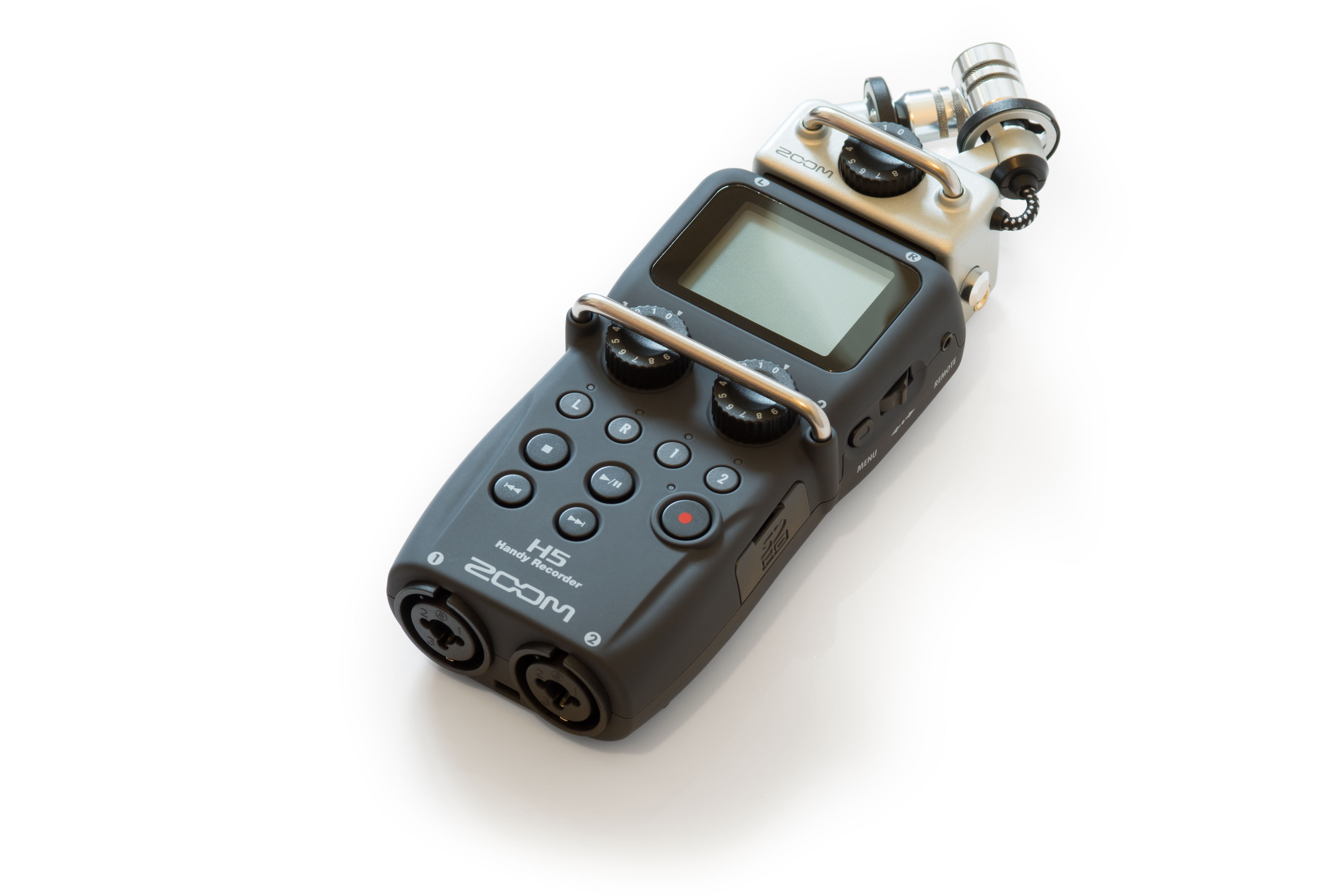
The H5 Handy Recorder

Zoom H5 Handy Recorder is a handheld digital audio recorder from Zoom Corporation, introduced in January 2014. A successor to the Zoom H4n, the new model features interchangeable input capsules with microphones (as does the Zoom H6), allowing the recording of up to four tracks simultaneously, both internal and external.

== Features ==
The H5 can record in WAV format up to 24-bit/96kHz as well as MP3. Sound can be recorded with up to four separate channels through the inputs. Several built-in effects are available, including a low-cut filter, input compressor and limiter, or a playback speed and pitch control.

Two XLR/TRS combo connectors are provided with an adjustable gain and phantom power.

Both SD and SDHC memory cards are supported with a capacity of up to 32 GB.

== Peripherals ==
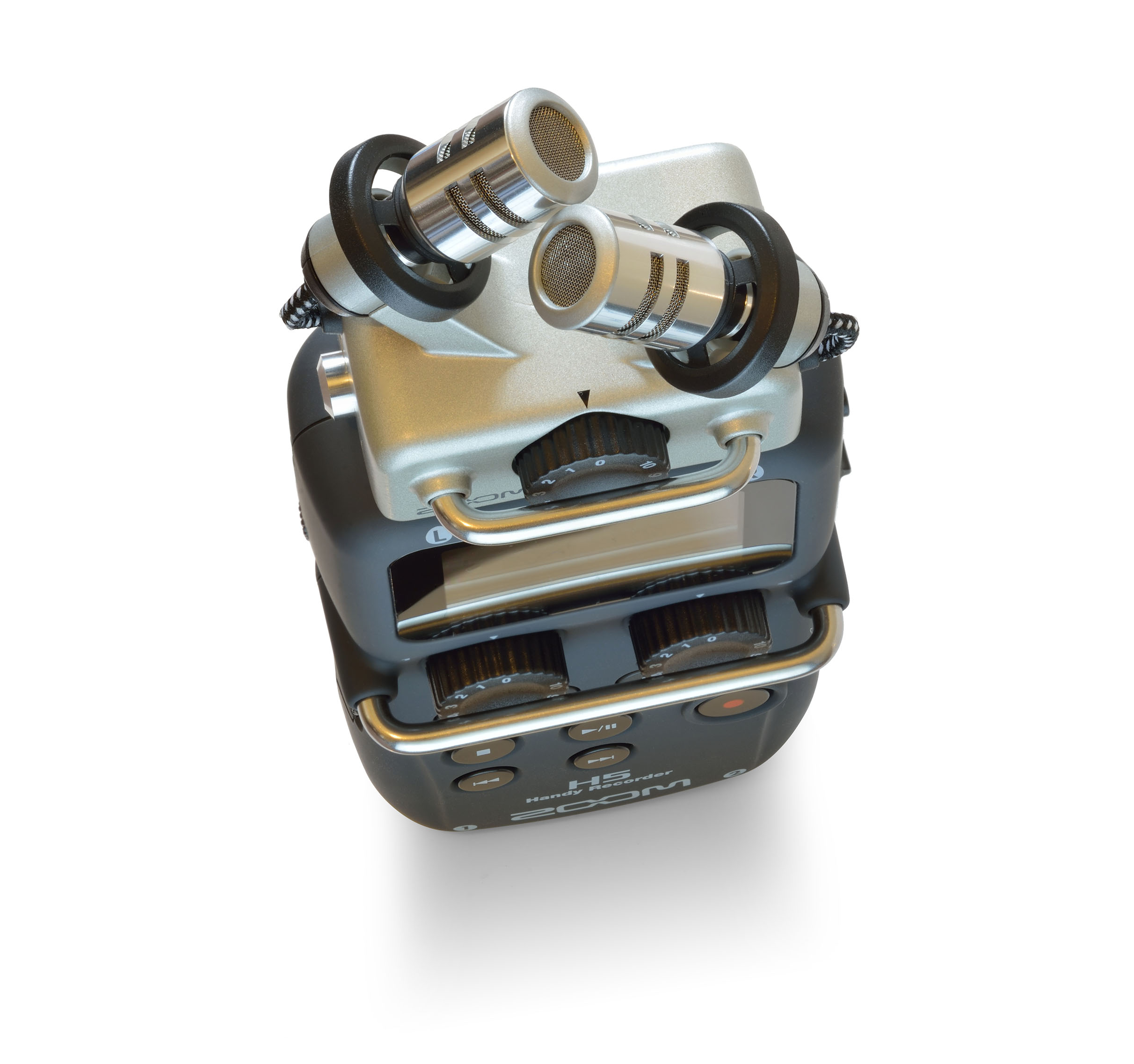
X-Y Microphone capsule XYH-5 on the H5 Handy Recorder

The retail box includes several accessories, such as an X-Y Microphone capsule, rubber-foam windshield, plastic case, two AA batteries and a manual.

== Reception ==
Overall the reception for the Zoom H5 Handy Recorder since its release has been positive.

Transom called the H5 a worthy successor to the H4n, though they found that the optional microphone modules were of mixed quality. Ty Ford praised the recorder for the number of features available for the price. Audio Media International called the H5 a "capable and straightforward portable recorder". ProPhoto magazine was impressed with the versatility and recording quality of the device.

In January 2015 H5 won the TEC Award in the Recording Devices category.
