= Zoom H2n Handy Recorder =

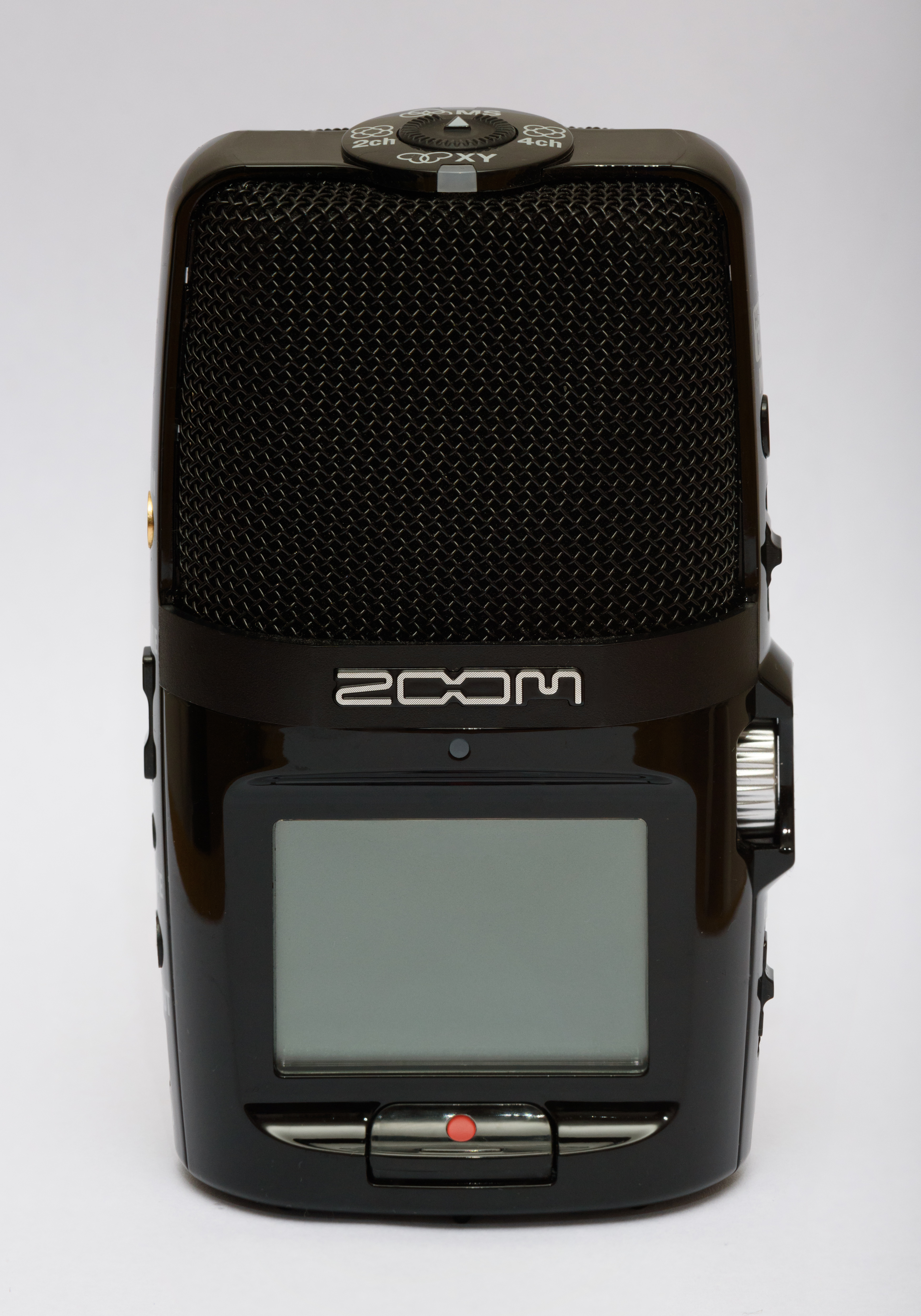
Zoom H2n

The Zoom H2n is a portable digital sound recording device manufactured by Zoom and was introduced in 2011. It is the successor of the Zoom H2 recorder. The Zoom H2n has four microphone capsules (including one bidirectional) built inside it. Musical applications for the H2n include the ability to use the device as a stereo or multi-track (four-channel) recorder; the device also includes built-in editor for some minor editing works within the device.

== Operation ==
The Zoom H2n is capable of more than 20 hours of operation using two standard AA batteries. The device weighs 130g without batteries and has a reference speaker for listening to the recordings.

== Key features ==
It can record in WAV format up to 24-bit/96 kHz and MP3 up to 320 kbit/s. It has additional functions like Lo-cut Filter, Compressor/Limiter, Auto Gain, Pre-Rec, Auto-Rec, Tuner, Metronome, Variable Speed Playback built into it.

== Recording modes ==
Zoom H2n sound recording test

The device can record in MS (mid-side), XY, MS+XY (two-channel) and MS+XY (four-channel) modes. If the 2.00 firmware update has been applied, it can also record in the 360-degree ambisonic format, along a horizontal plane. The 3.00 firmware update also added support for four-channel input multitrack mode when connected as a USB audio interface, and the function that accepts input in spatial audio format when used in multitrack mode. The device can record in Directional (XY, MS mid mics) and Bidirectional (MS side mic) modes.
