= Sentiment (Claire Rousay album) =

Studio album by Claire Rousay
- Released: April 19, 2024
- Genres: Pop; ambient
- Length: 37:29
- Label: Thrill Jockey

Claire Rousay chronology
Anything You Can Do... (2022)	Sentiment (2024)	The Bloody Lady (2024)

Sentiment is an album by Canadian-American musician Claire Rousay, released on April 19, 2024, through Thrill Jockey.

== Background and release ==
Rousay characterized Sentiment as more pop-oriented than her previous work. In an interview with Stereogum to promote the album, she described her sound as "emo ambient".

Released on April 19, 2024, Sentiment marked Rousay's debut on the Thrill Jockey record label. The album was the first of three records Rousay completed ahead of signing to the label.

== Critical reception ==
Professional ratings
Aggregate scores
Source	Rating
Metacritic	80/100
Review scores
Source	Rating
The Guardian	4/5 stars
Pitchfork	7.6/10

According to the review aggregator Metacritic, Sentiment received "generally favorable reviews" based on a weighted average score of 80 out of 100 from 11 critic scores.

== Track listing ==
Sentiment track listing
No.	Title	Length
1.	"4pm"	2:48
2.	"Head"	4:43
3.	"It Could Be Anything"	4:41
4.	"Asking for It"	1:52
5.	"III"	4:36
6.	"Lover's Spit Plays in the Background"	4:02
7.	"Sycamore Skylight"	5:07
8.	"Please 5 More Minutes" (featuring Lala Lala)	4:50
9.	"W Sunset Blvd"	1:17
10.	"ILY2" (featuring Hand Habits)	3:33
Total length:		37:29

== Personnel ==
- Claire Rousay – vocals, production, mixing
- Bennett Littlejohn – bass guitar (track 3), mixing
- Julia Brüssel – violin (tracks 1, 2, 5)
- Theodore Cale Schafer – vocals (track 1)
- Mari Maurice – electronics (tracks 4, 6), violin (tracks 4, 6, 7)
- Emily Wittbrodt – cello (track 5)
- Lillie West – guitar, synthesizer, voice (track 8)
- Meg Duffy – guitar (track 10)
- Andrew Weathers – mastering
