= A Softer Focus =

2021 Claire Rousay album

Studio album by Claire Rousay
- Released: April 9, 2021
- Genre: Ambient
- Length: 33:21
- Label: American Dreams

Claire Rousay chronology
Both (2020)	A Softer Focus (2021)	An Afternoon Whine (2021)

A Softer Focus is a 2021 studio album by Canadian-American musician Claire Rousay released on April 9, 2021, via American Dreams.

== Background and composition ==
Rousay conceived of A Softer Focus in collaboration with longtime friend and artist Dani Toral, who created the album cover, music videos, and other visual materials. Toral, a ceramicist, also crafted ceramic whistles included with the special edition vinyl record of the album.

With the album's more traditional instrumentation and melodic structures, A Softer Focus marked a creative departure from Rousay's previous works, more experimental compositions which drew heavily from field recordings.

== Critical reception ==
Professional ratings
Aggregate scores
Source	Rating
Metacritic	82/100
Review scores
Source	Rating
Beats Per Minute	82%
Exclaim!	8/10
Pitchfork	7.6/10
PopMatters	8/10
Under the Radar	7.5/10

According to the review aggregator Metacritic, A Softer Focus received "universal acclaim" based on a weighted average score of 82 out of 100 from 7 critic scores. Critics including Tom Piekarski of Exclaim! and Chris Ingalls of PopMatters characterized the album as a successful venture into more "accessible" material for Rousay. Robert Barry of The Quietus praised A Softer Focus as "a singular meditation on life and memory that never falls into the traps of nostalgia."

In addition to naming the album among the best jazz and experimental releases of 2021, Pitchfork recognized A Softer Focus as one of that year's 50 best albums overall.

=== Year-end lists ===
Select year-end rankings of A Softer Focus
Critic/Publication	List	Rank	Ref.
Pitchfork	The 50 Best Albums of 2021	30	

== Track listing ==
All tracks are written by Claire Rousay.

A Softer Focus track listing
No.	Title	Length
1.	"Preston Ave"	1:36
2.	"Discrete (The Market)"	6:34
3.	"Peak Chroma"	8:48
4.	"Diluted Dreams"	8:35
5.	"Stoned Gesture"	4:49
6.	"A Kind of Promise"	2:59
Total length:		33:21

== Personnel ==
Credits adapted from the American Dreams website.

- Claire Rousay – composition, production, recording
- Lia Kohl – cello (tracks 2, 3, 6)
- Ben Baker Billington – vocals (track 4)
- Macie Stewart – violin (track 4)
- Alex Cunningham – violin (track 5)
- Andrew Weathers – mastering

== Release history ==
Release dates and formats for A Softer Focus
Region	Date	Label(s)	Format(s)	Ref.
Various	April 9, 2021	American Dreams	CD; digital download; streaming; vinyl	
