= Zoom H2 Handy Recorder =

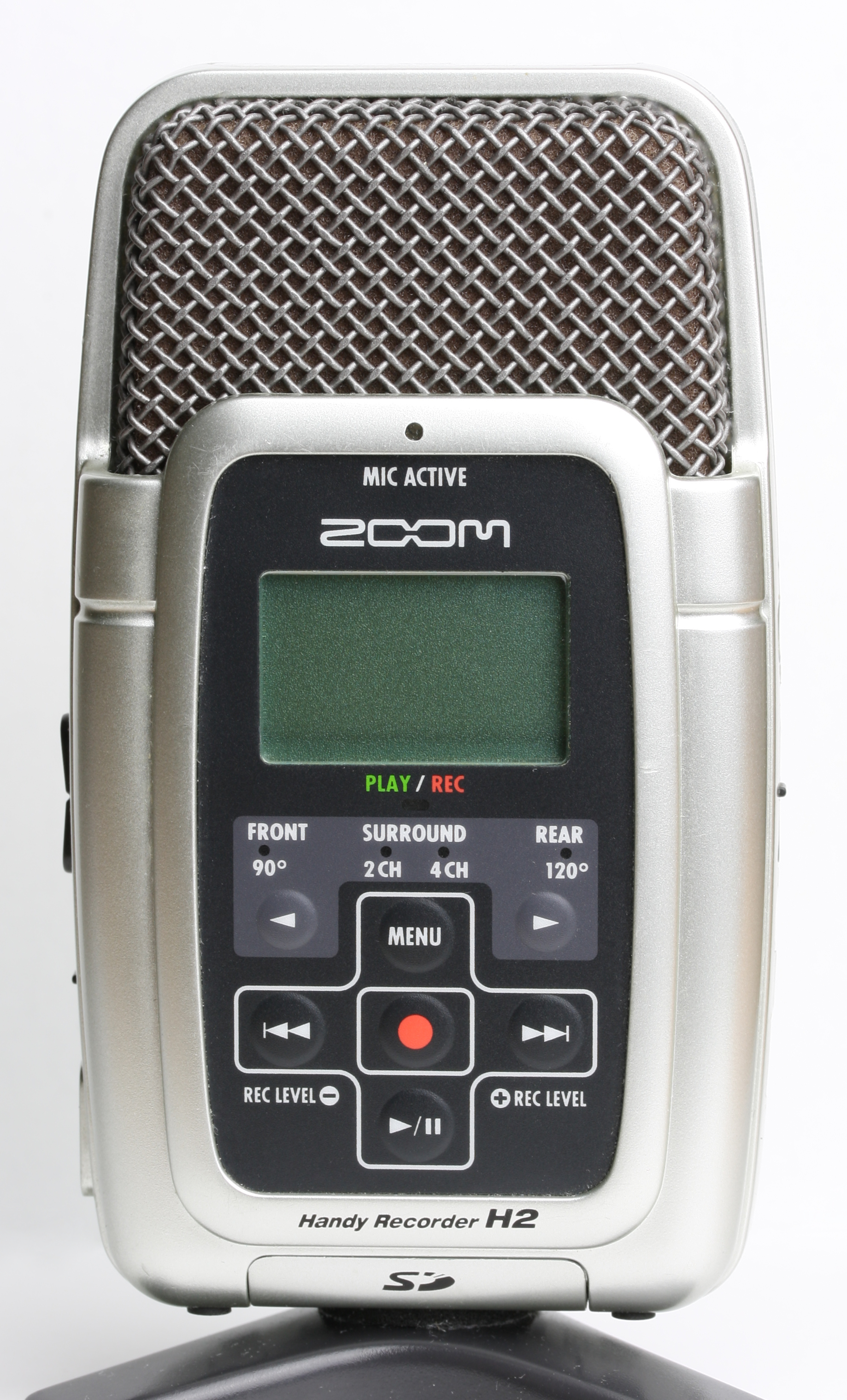
The H2 Digital Handy Recorder

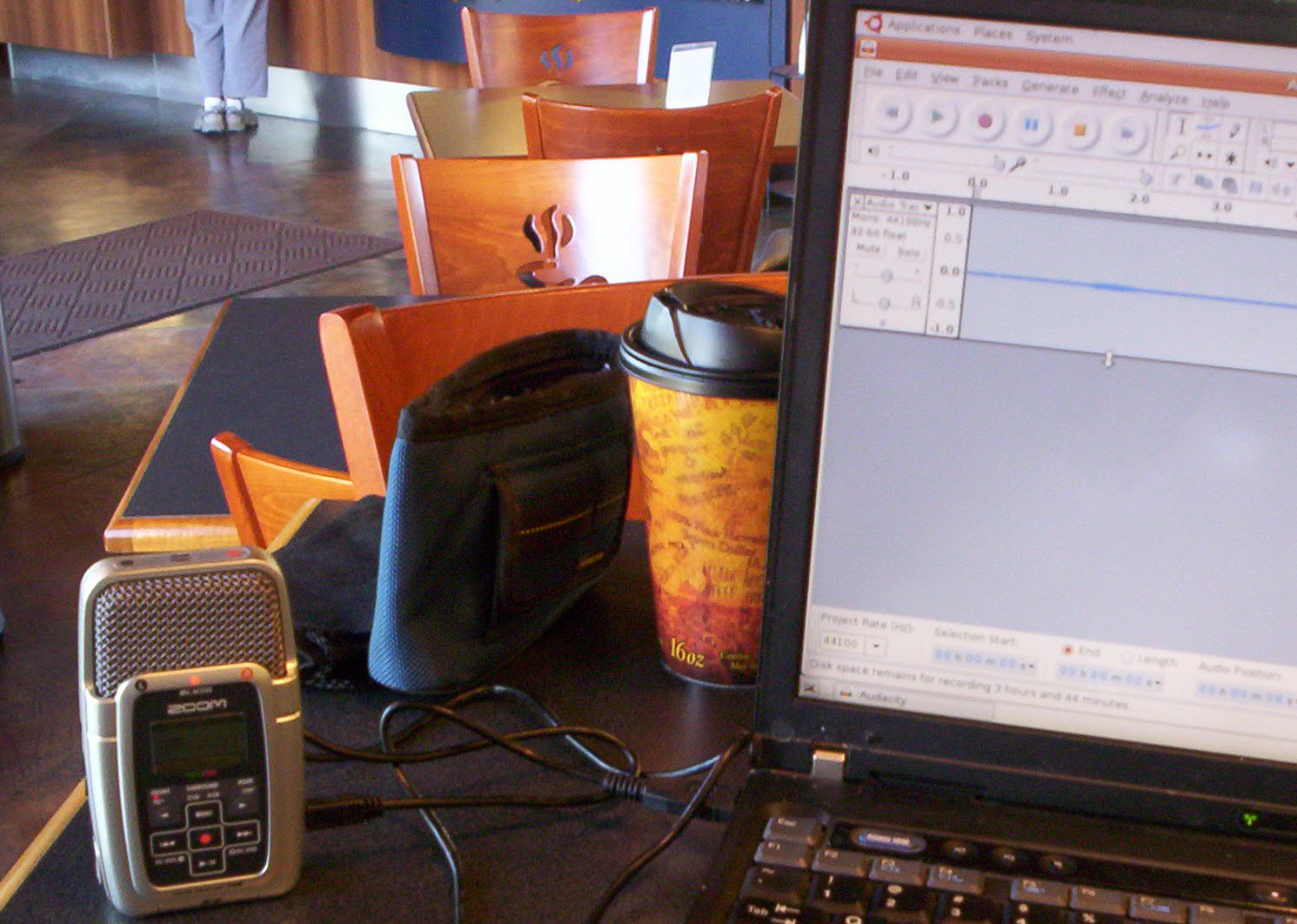
H2 in use as a USB audio input device

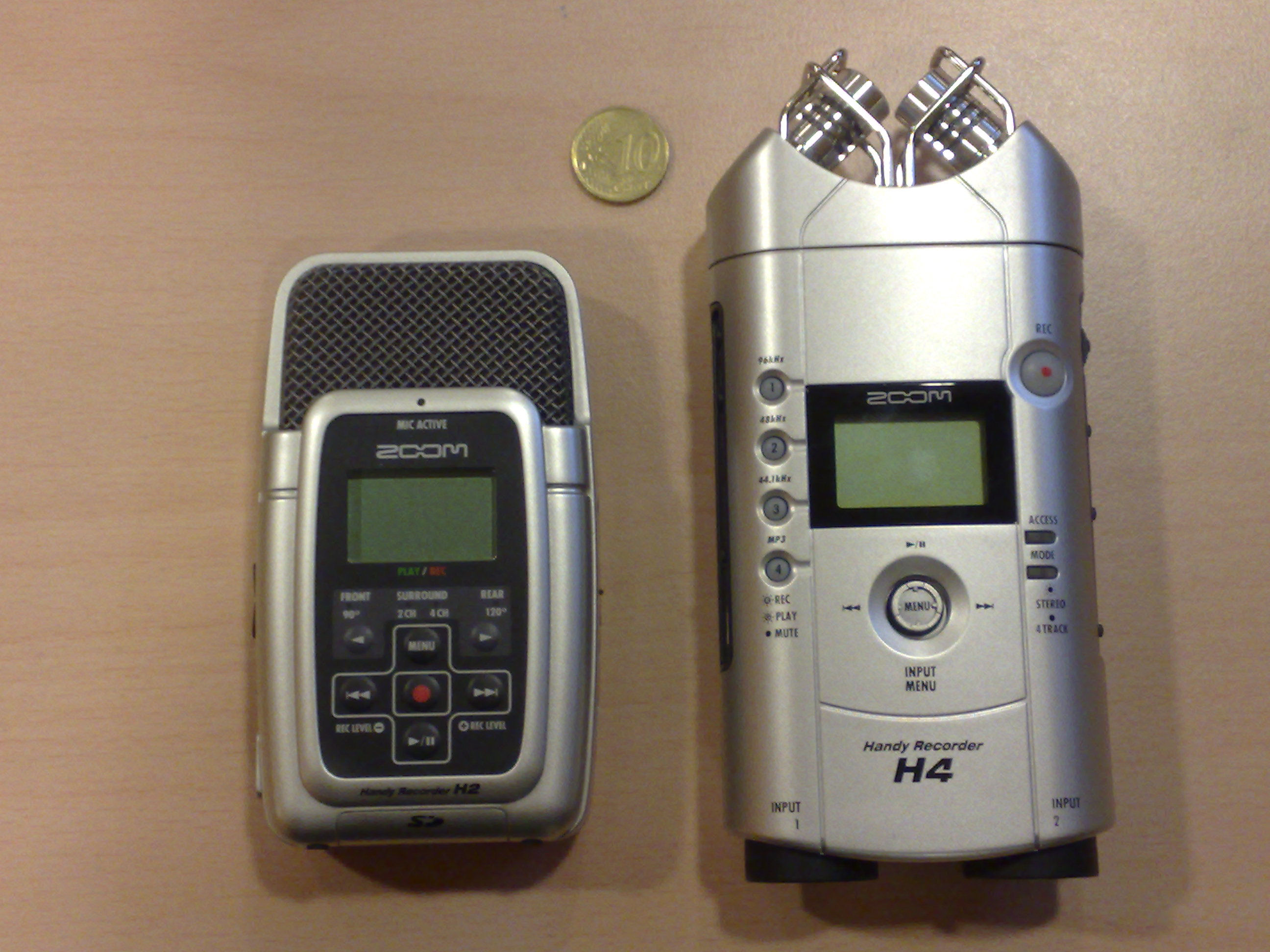
H2 and H4 with 10 eurocents for scale

The H2 Handy Recorder is a handheld digital audio recorder from Zoom first announced at the NAMM Show in February 2007. It records very high quality digital stereo or 4-channel audio on a hand-held unit, and has been called "the studio on a stick."

== Peripherals and uses ==
Included in the retail box are an SD card, desk stand, handle for putting the H2 in a microphone stand, wind screen, 3.5mm TRS to RCA cable, earbud headphones, USB cable and power adapter.

The H2's microphones, functionality, and use of standard USB and SD interfaces make it suitable both for recording high-quality sound and in many speech applications. The H2 has been cited by various oral history associations, such as Oral History Association and Vermont Folklife Center as an affordable option for recording narrator interviews.

The H2's rate of data transfer via the USB 2.0 port is "full speed" of up to 12 Mbit/s, the same as USB 1.1 and much slower than the widely available USB 2.0 Hi-Speed of 60 Mbit/s.

The H2 can be powered either by two standard AA batteries or a power adapter. Recording time with low self-discharge 2000 mAh NiMH batteries is about 6 hours for mp3 bitrate set to 128 kbit/s.

== Recorder features ==
The H2 can record in WAV format (at 96, 48, or 44.1 kHz in either 16 or 24 bit depth). Recording to compressed MP3 format at up to 320 kbit/s or VBR is supported in the 2-channel recording mode. Officially the H2 supports SD flash memory cards, but some SDHC cards of up to 32 GB capacity have been confirmed by Zoom to work.

The H2 has a three-way gain input switch, with settings for low (useful for loud sounds, such as a live rock band), medium, and high (useful for speech, such as one or two people podcasting in a quiet room.)

Other features of the recorder are:
LCD
Four internal microphones
2-Channel Stereo recording up to 24bit/96 kHz
4-Channel Stereo recording up to 24bit/48 kHz (Creates two sound files)
W-XY mic patterns with 4 mic capsules and signal processing allows Front 90° cardioid, Rear 120° cardioid and 360° polar patterns
Time Stamp and Track Marker functions in Broadcast WAV Format (BWF)
Auto Gain Control
Auto Start function
Low-cut filter to remove wind noise
On-board chromatic Guitar/Bass tuner
1/8 External Mic In
1/8 Line Level In

== Comparison with Zoom H4 recorder ==
Unlike the larger H4 Handy Recorder which succeeded it, the H2 does not include ports to accept XLR or 1/4-inch connectors, but has standard 1/8-inch (3.5mm) external microphone and line level inputs. The input jack for external stereo microphones supports plug-in power. The H2 has built-in microphones, but allows external ones to be used if different characteristics are required.

Unlike the H4, the H2 makes no provision for multi-track recording, but its 360-degree polar sound recording can record in 4 channel audio, which can later be converted to 5.1 channel audio using computer software.

The H2 and the H4 can be used as audio interfaces to a computer. When connected to a host computer via USB, the H2 can act as a microphone, audio input (with microphone or line input) and output device with stereo line output. It can also be used as a USB file storage device.

Typical prices in the United States as of 2011 were around US$350 for the H4n and around $200 for the H2 and H2n.

== Design changes and delays ==
The H2 began shipping on August 21, 2007. This was delayed from the original May 2007 shipping date as an additional microphone was added; the original three-microphone Mid-Side design was lacking in some respects, and was abandoned in favor of the four-microphone W-X/Y design. The built-in high-fidelity electret condenser microphone capsules are arranged to allow stereo recording and have user-selectable parameters to allow for either a 90- or 120-degree pickup angle. The H2 can also be used to record a 360-degree soundfield.
