= The Ivy House =

Pub in Nunhead, London

Coordinates: 51°27′30″N 0°03′08″W

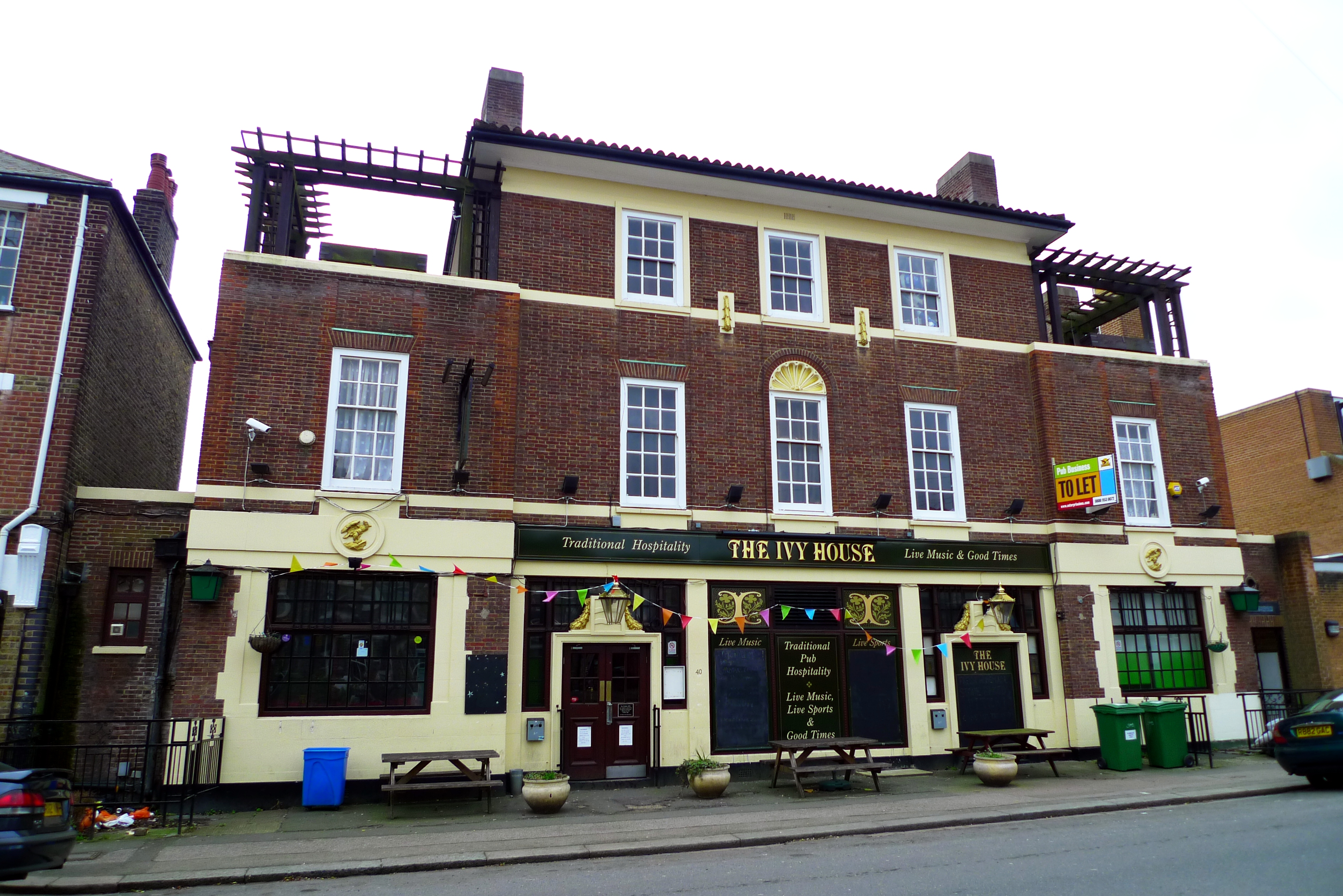
- The front of the pub in early 2008.

General information
- Location: 40 Stuart Road, Nunhead, London, SE15
- Year built: 1938
- Opened: 1860s as Newlands Tavern, 1990s as The Ivy House

Design and construction
- Designations

Listed Building – Grade II
- Designated: 20 Apr 2012
- Reference no.: 1408530

The Ivy House is a Grade II listed public house at 40 Stuart Road, Nunhead, London. It is London's first co-operatively owned pub, and the first in the UK purchased on behalf of a community using the right to bid provisions in the Localism Act 2011.

== History ==
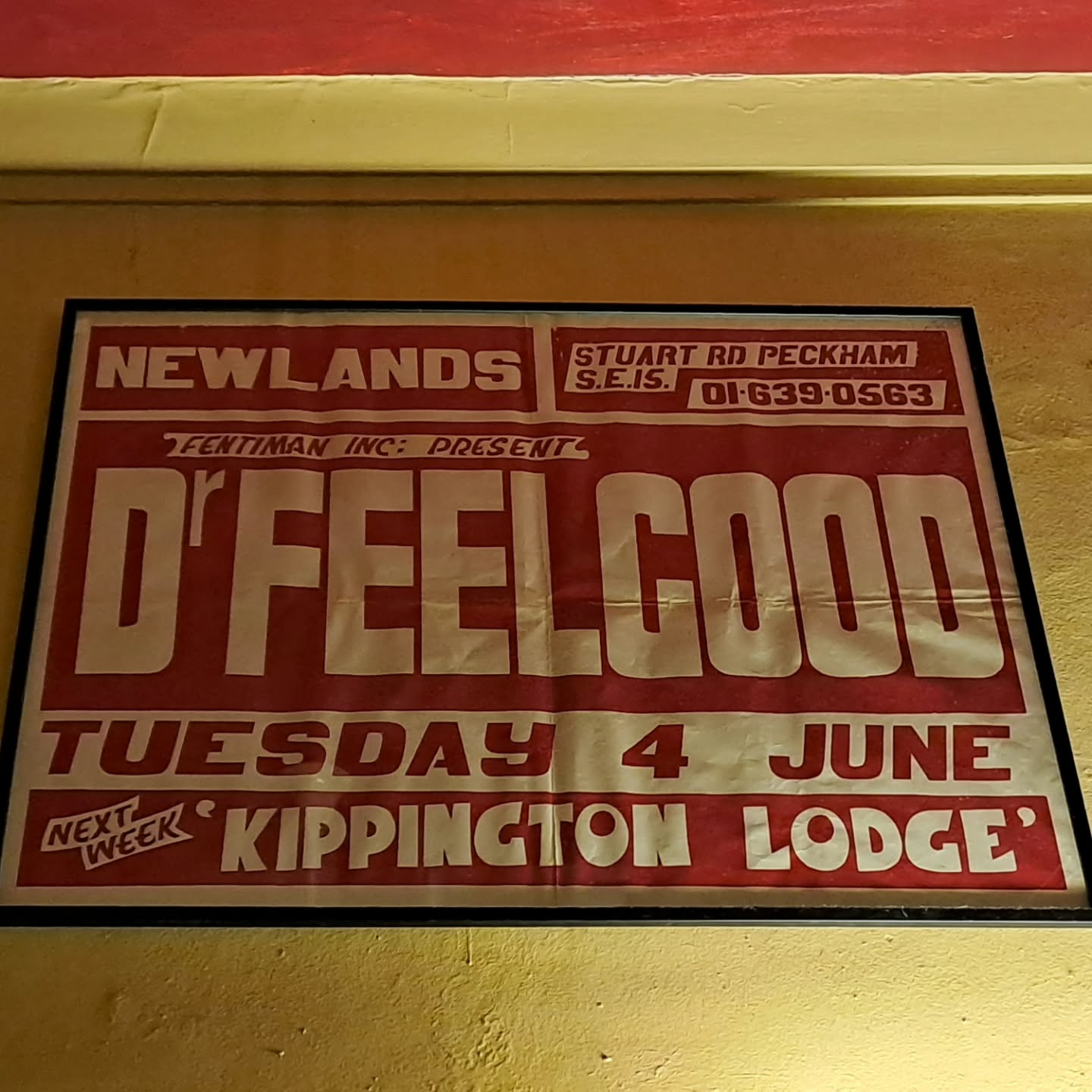
A poster of a Dr. Feelgood concert at the pub when it was Newlands Tavern. The poster is currently framed in the pub.

It was originally known as the Newlands Tavern, and was designed by the architect A. E. Sewell in the 1930s for Truman's Brewery. Opening on 4 October 1938, the new building replaced an earlier pub which had existed since the 1860s. It still contains many original features including a curved bar, timber panels, and a concert hall in the back that recalls early Victorian music halls. The hall was used for dances and parties, including on VE Day. The pub was narrowly missed by a V1 rocket in 1944 that destroyed much of the street around it.

It was a venue for bands since at least the 1960s. Newlands Tavern was one of the major pub music venues in South London during the mid-1970s pub rock boom, with acts and performers including Ian Dury (in Kilburn and the High Roads), Elvis Costello (in Flip City), Joe Strummer (in The 101ers), Eddie and The Hot Rods, Graham Parker, Jeff Beck, and Dr. Feelgood.

The pub was later renamed the Stuart Arms in the 1980s, before becoming The Ivy House upon purchase by Enterprise Inns in the 1990s.

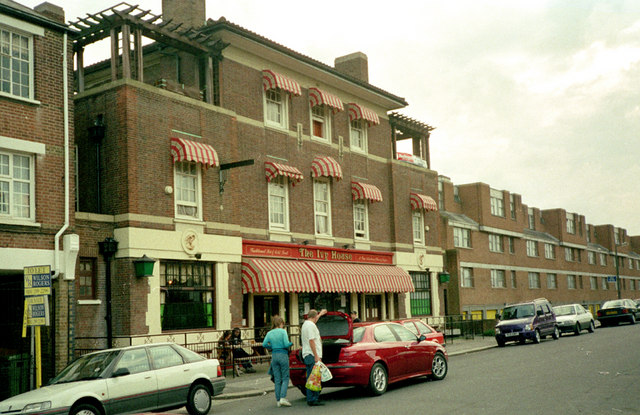
The front of the pub in 1998.

In April 2012 Enterprise Inns evicted the tenants with only a week's notice and announced their intention to sell it for redevelopment into flats. A group of locals, with the support of CAMRA, campaigned to get the pub its Grade II listing and also listed as an asset of community value (ACV) by Southwark London Borough Council. It was the first in London to receive the latter designation under the Localism Act 2011. Ivy House Community Pub Limited bought the freehold of the pub on 15 March 2013, upon which it became the first ACV to be purchased on behalf of a community using the right to bid provisions contained in the aforementioned act, and the city's first co-operatively owned pub. An arthouse documentary film Public House by Sarah Turner follows the pub's development into a co-op. The day-to-day of the pub is run by co-managers, above which are the management committee, consisting of eight shareholders who are residents of the local area that oversee operations.

In 2018 bar staff at the pub went on strike over zero hours contracts and working conditions, arguing that workers (separate from the board and shareholders) should "genuinely be included as equal beneficiaries of [the] community project". The staff are members of the BFAWU union.

The Ivy House has been used as a set for films and television, including Legend, the 2015 biopic of the Kray twins, and the 2025 Netflix series, Too Much.

In recent years the Ivy House has once again emerged as a grassroots live music venue, with notable acts such as Goat Girl, caroline, Kiran Leonard, Darren Hayman and The Monochrome Set taking to the stage, as well as "raucous" monthly live band karaoke nights.

The Ivy House made Time Out's list of The 50 Best Pubs in London, in both 2023 and 2025.

== Notable artists to play The Ivy House or Newlands Tavern ==
- The 101ers
- Ace
- Alabama 3
- Alessi's Ark
- Angeline Morrison
- The Band of Holy Joy
- Brinsley Schwarz as their Pop group Kippington Lodge
- The Burning Hell
- Café Society
- The Cardiacs
- Caroline
- Charles Hayward
- Childhood
- Chilli Willi and the Red Hot Peppers
- Chorusgirl
- Chris Wood
- Darren Hayman
- Dave Swarbrick
- David Cronenberg's Wife
- Dr. Feelgood
- Eddie and The Hot Rods
- Euros Childs
- Eliza Carthy
- Ewan McLennan
- Ex-Void
- Fat White Family
- Fatso featuring Neil Innes
- Fightmilk
- Flip City featuring Elvis Costello
- Florence Welch
- Geraint Watkins
- Goat Girl
- Graham Parker and The Rumour
- Hank Dogs
- Jeff Beck
- John Kirkpatrick
- John Otway and Wild Willy Barrett
- Jonathan Kelly's Outside
- Johnny Sox featuring future members of The Stranglers
- The June Brides
- Kilburn and the High Roads
- Kiran Leonard
- The Kursaal Flyers
- Laura J Martin
- Los Pacaminos featuring Paul Young
- Martin Carthy
- McGuinness Flint
- Me Rex
- Mica Paris
- Mick Clarke with SALT
- Mikey Georgeson
- The Monochrome Set
- Naima Bock
- O'Hooley & Tidow
- Richard Dawson
- Rory Gallagher
- Ryley Walker
- Shingai Shoniwa of The Noisettes
- Thomas Truax
- The Tiger Lillies
- Trust Fund
- Wizz Jones
