= Dead meat =

Dead meat or Deadmeat can refer to:

- Dead Meat (album), a 2023 album by The Tubs
- Dead Meat (film), a 2004 Irish zombie film
- Dead Meat (YouTube channel), an American YouTube channel
- Dead Meat: 10 Years of Blood, Feathers & Lipstick, a 2014 album by Wednesday 13
- Deadmeat (film), British thriller film
- Deadmeat Disciples, a 2003 album by Deathchain
