= The Royal Oak, Bethnal Green =

Pub in Bethnal Green, London

Coordinates: 51.529581°N 0.0693760°W

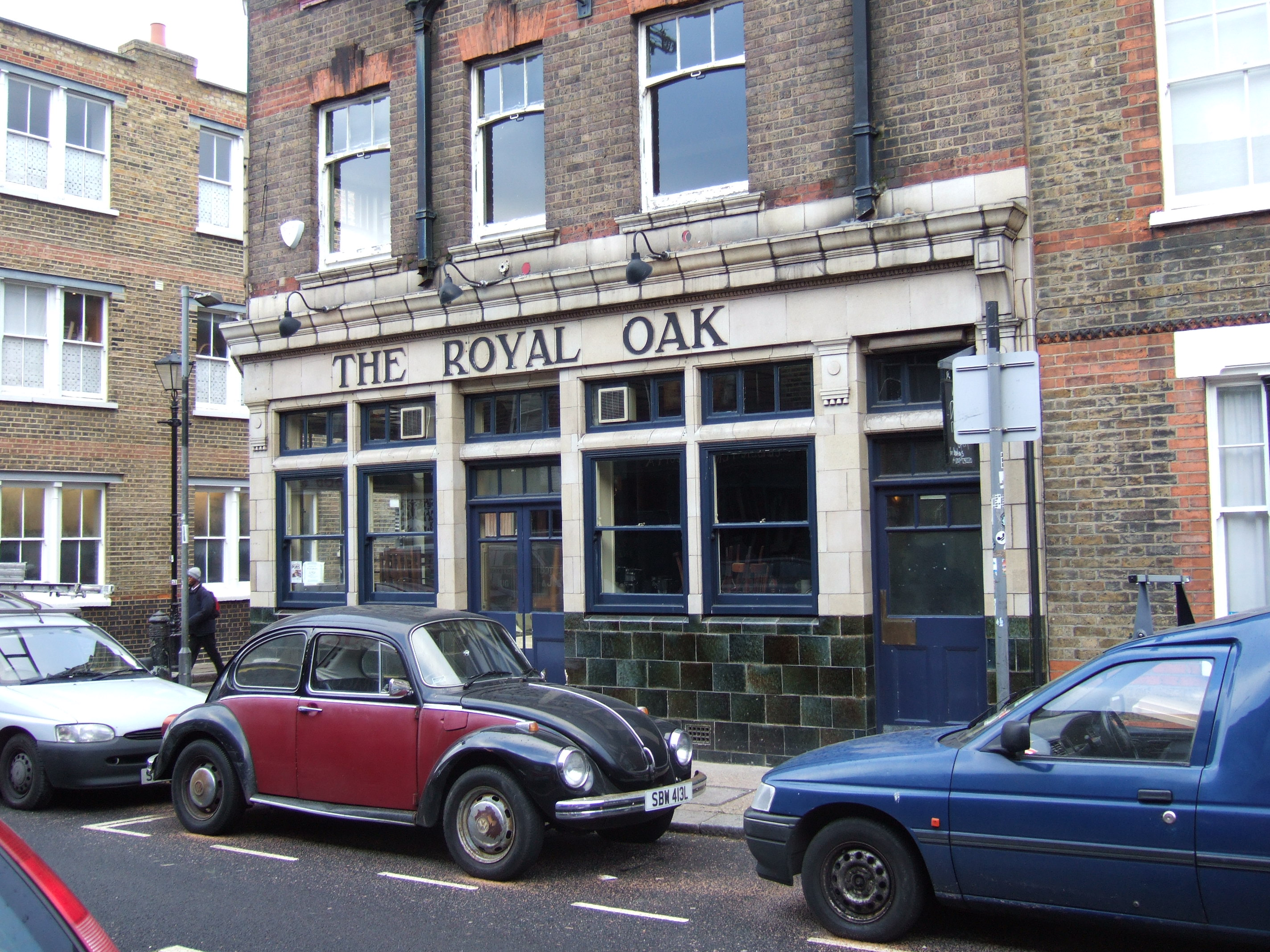
The Royal Oak, 2007

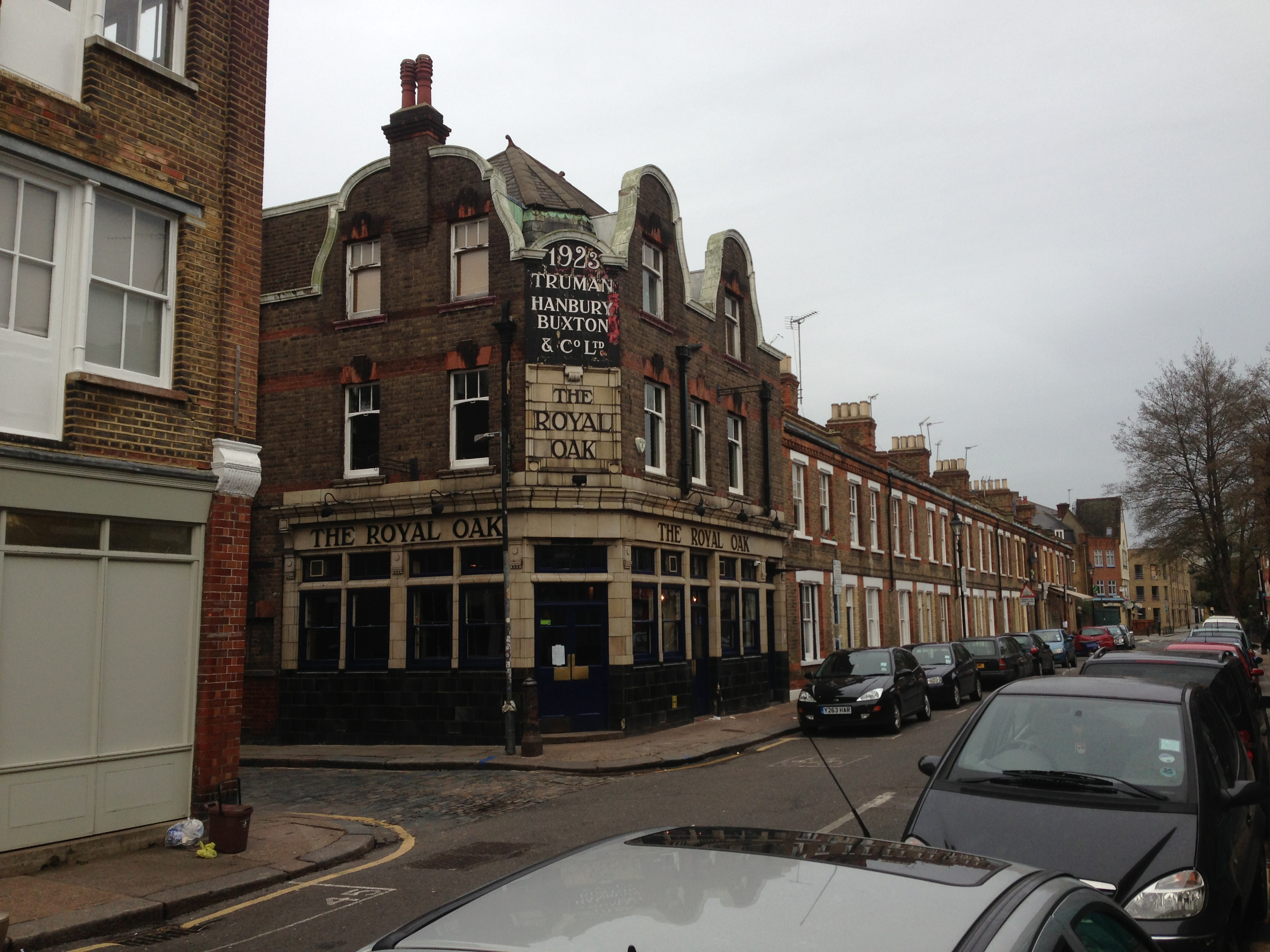
The Royal Oak, 2013

The Royal Oak is a Grade II listed public house at 73 Columbia Road, Bethnal Green, London, E2.

It was built in 1923 for Truman's Brewery, and probably designed by their in-house architect A. E. Sewell.

It was Grade II listed in 2015 by Historic England.

The pub has appeared in the TV series Goodnight Sweetheart, the 1998 film Lock, Stock and Two Smoking Barrels, and the 2015 film Legend.

In July 2020, the previously independently ran pub was bought by the chain Young's.
