= Peanut Butter (disambiguation) =

Peanut butter is a food paste or spread made from ground dry roasted peanuts.

Peanut butter may also refer to:

- Peanut Butter & Co., a peanut butter brand founded in 1998
- "Peanut Butter" (song), a 1961 single by The Marathons
- "Peanut Butter" (Twennynine song), 1979
- Peanut Butter (album), a 2015 album by Joanna Gruesome
- Mr. Peanutbutter, a character in the adult animated series BoJack Horseman
