= Bringing the Backline =

Studio album by Trust Fund
- Released: 2 July 2018
- Recorded: March 2017
- Studio: JT Soar, Nottingham
- Length: 34:57
- Producer: Patrick Hyland

Trust Fund chronology
We Have Always Lived in the Harolds (2016)	Bringing the Backline (2018)	Has It Been a While? (2024)

Singles from Bringing the Backline
- 1. "Carson McCullers" Released: 17 May 2018

Bringing the Backline is the fourth studio album by British band Trust Fund. It was released on 2 July 2018. Following the album's release, the band announced it would be their last.

== Background and release ==
Trust Fund released their first two albums No One's Coming for Us and Seems Unfair in 2015, and their third album We Have Always Lived in the Harolds in 2016.

Bringing the Backline was mostly recorded in Nottingham in March 2017. The single "Carson McCullers", named after the author Carson McCullers, was released on 17 May 2018. Bringing the Backline was released on 2 July 2018 on LP, cassette (sold by DIY record label Hidden Bay Records), and as a digital download under the Creative Commons BY-NC-ND 3.0 license.

Following the release of the album, band leader Ellis Jones announced that it would be Trust Fund's last, for "various non-dramatic reasons." Trust Fund went on to release another album Has It Been a While? in 2024.

== Critical reception ==
Professional ratings
Review scores
Source	Rating
Clash	8/10
No Ripcord	7/10
Pitchfork	6.9/10

Emma Garland of Vice wrote that "on the surface, Bringing The Backline feels like a mic drop from someone who has absolutely had it – someone who kind of hates music and has responded by making a really, really, really good album about it." In a 6.9/10 review for Pitchfork, Calum Marsh wrote that "If these songs have an overarching theme, it's how deeply disenchanted Jones feels with making music...Occasionally his lyrics convey nothing short of despair."

Clash compared Bringing The Backline to Trust Fund's previous album We Have Always Lived in the Harolds, calling it "another future classic." No Ripcord wrote that the album "does suffer from throwing in too many ideas at once."

== Track listing ==
No.	Title	Length
1.	"Blue X"	3:05
2.	"Jonathan"	3:40
3.	"embarrassing!"	2:29
4.	"Carson McCullers"	3:00
5.	"a song"	3:25
6.	"King of CM"	3:10
7.	"Alexandra"	3:37
8.	"Wipe it down"	4:14
9.	"Abundant"	4:57
10.	"The mill"	3:14
Total length:		34:57

== Personnel ==
- Patrick Hyland – production, mixing, mastering
