= Rose and Crown, Stoke Newington =

Pub in Stoke Newington, London

Coordinates: 51.561011°N 0.083713°W

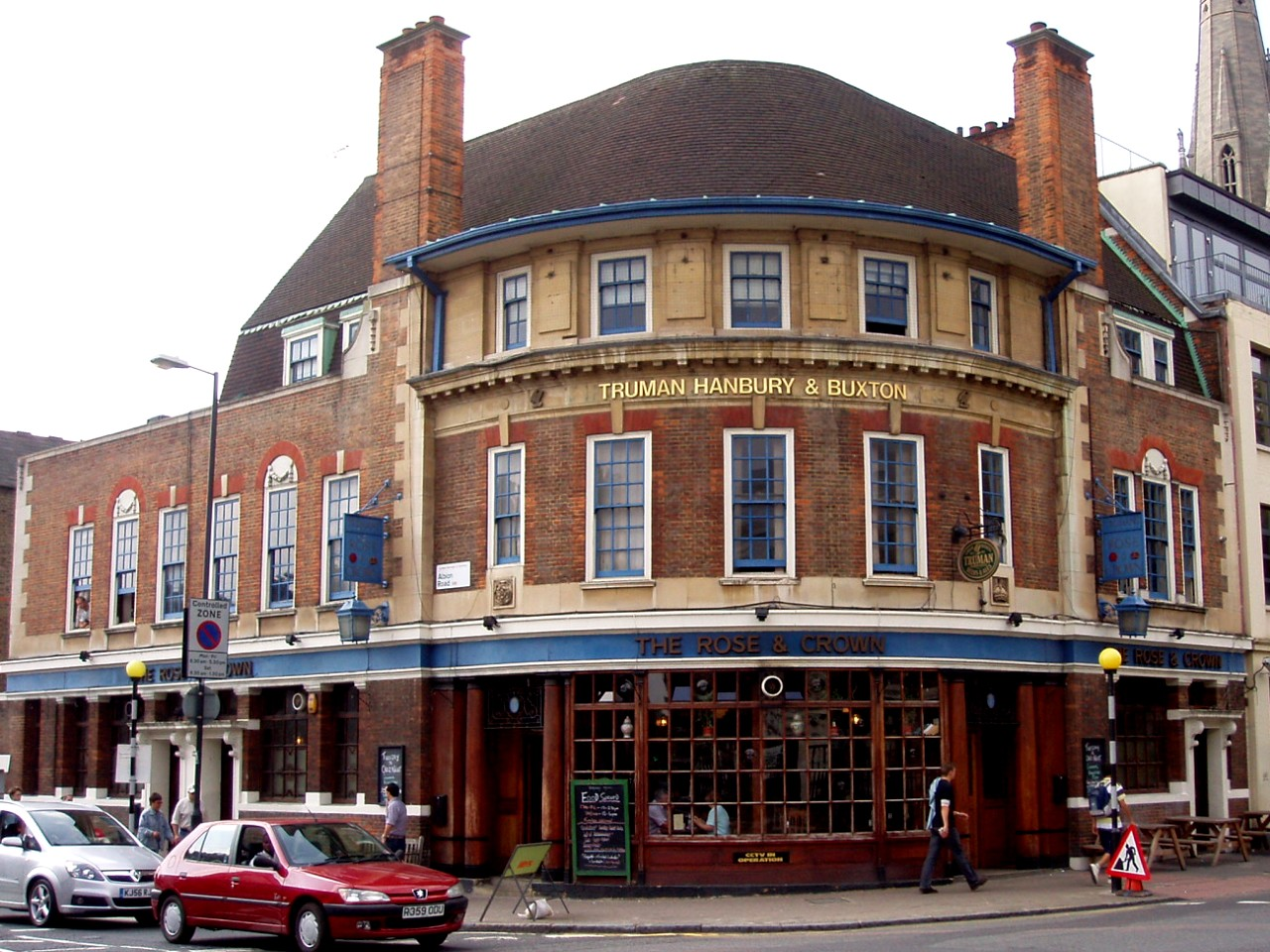
The Rose and Crown, 2007

The Rose and Crown is a Grade II listed public house at 199 Stoke Newington Church Street, Stoke Newington, Hackney, London, N16 9ES.

It was built in 1930–32 for Truman's Brewery, and designed by their in-house architect A. E. Sewell.

It was Grade II listed in 2015 by Historic England.

== See also ==
- List of pubs in London
