= Trust Fund =

Trust Fund refers to funds in a Trust.

It may also refer to:

- Trust Fund (band), English band
- Trust Fund (film), 2016 American film
