= A. E. Sewell =

British architect (1872–1946)

Arthur Edward Sewell (1872–1946) was an English architect, particularly known for the public houses he designed whilst working as the in-house architect for Truman's Brewery. His career peaked in the 1920s and 1930s, and at least five pubs that he designed in that period are now listed buildings with Historic England. In all, he designed around 50 pubs.

== Career ==
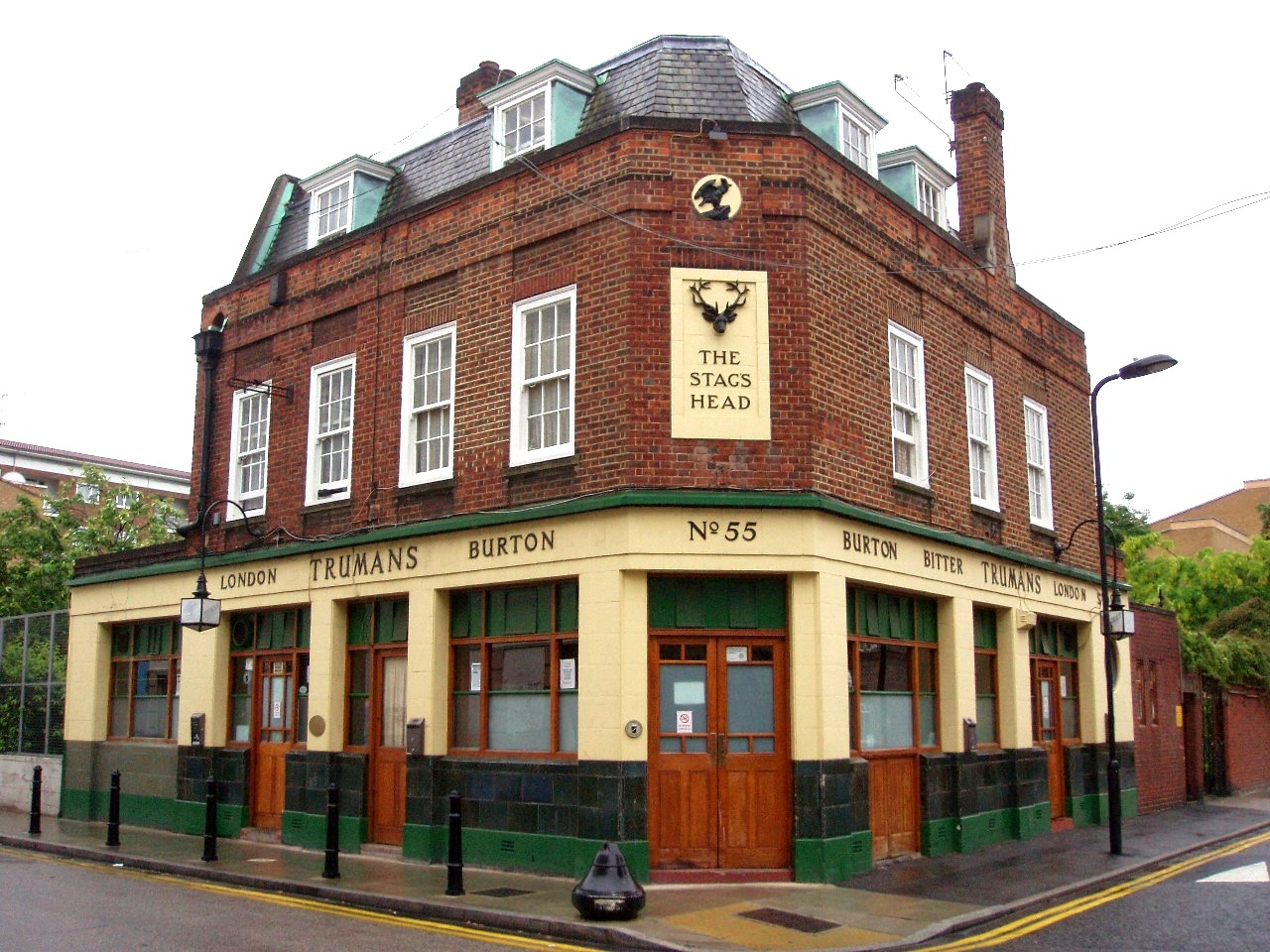
The Stags Head, Hoxton. Typical of the neo-Georgian pubs designed by Sewell between the World Wars.

Sewell was the lead in-house architect for Truman's Brewery between 1910 and 1939, and he designed around 50 pubs during his lifetime. His career peaked in the 1920s and 1930s when English brewers were trying to shed the Victorian sawdust-on-the-floor image of their pubs for a less rowdy atmosphere with a greater appeal to women—a concept termed the "improved pub". His pub designs generally eschewed the then fashionable modernism in favour of nostalgic neo-Georgian or neo-Tudor designs that presented a dignified front that celebrated Englishness. According to Nikolaus Pevsner in The Buildings of England, Sewell's pubs "usually sport attractive faience decoration and domestic architectural motifs". The last known pub designed by Sewell was the Royal George, near Euston (c. 1939).

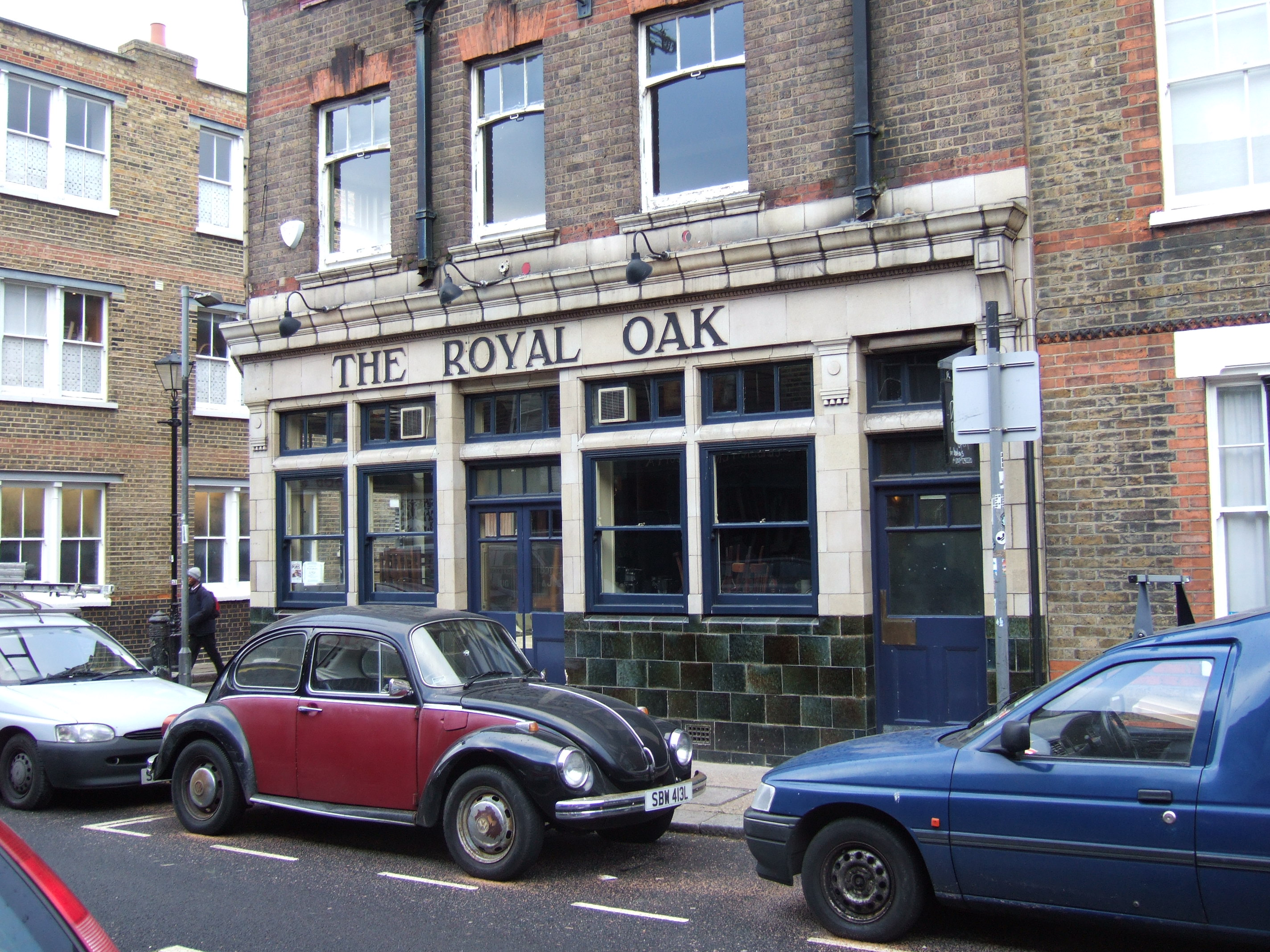
The Royal Oak, Bethnal Green.

=== 1920s ===
In 1923, Sewell designed The Royal Oak, a Grade II listed public house at 73 Columbia Road, Bethnal Green, London, E2, for Truman's Brewery.

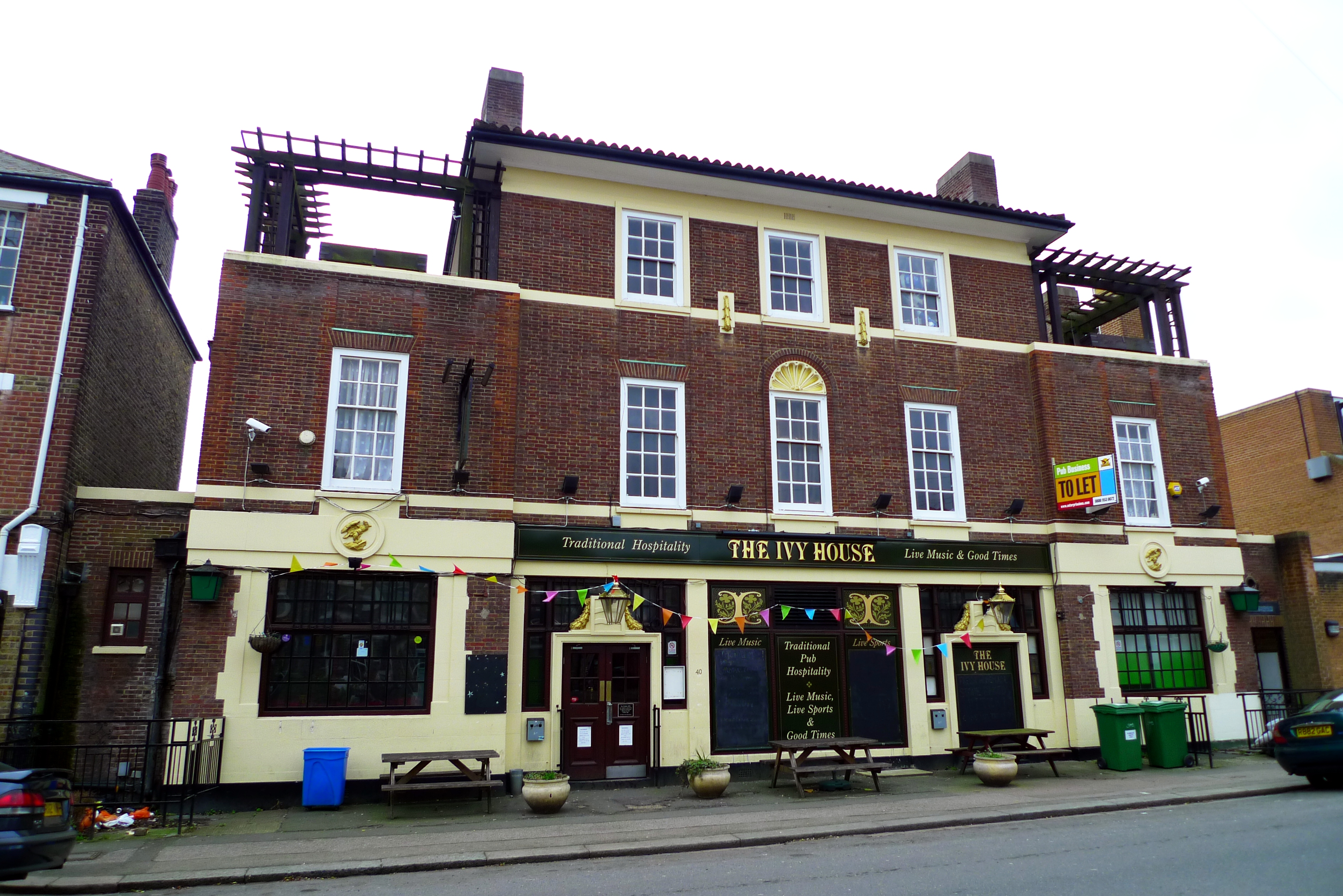
The Ivy House, Nunhead.

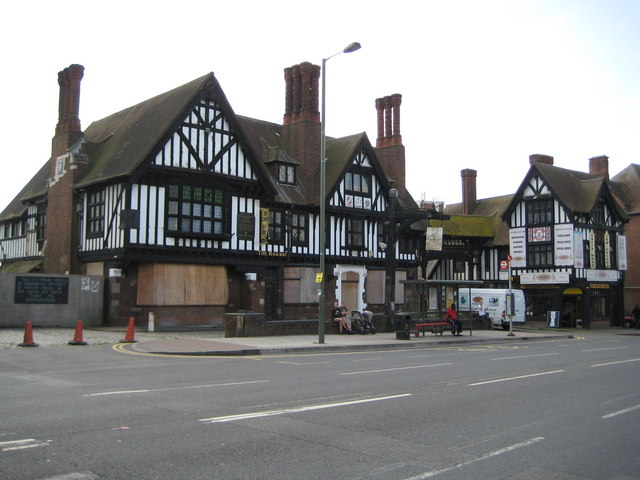
The Railway Hotel

=== 1930s ===
In the 1930s, he designed The Ivy House, a Grade II listed pub at 40 Stuart Road, Nunhead, London, and also for Truman's Brewery.

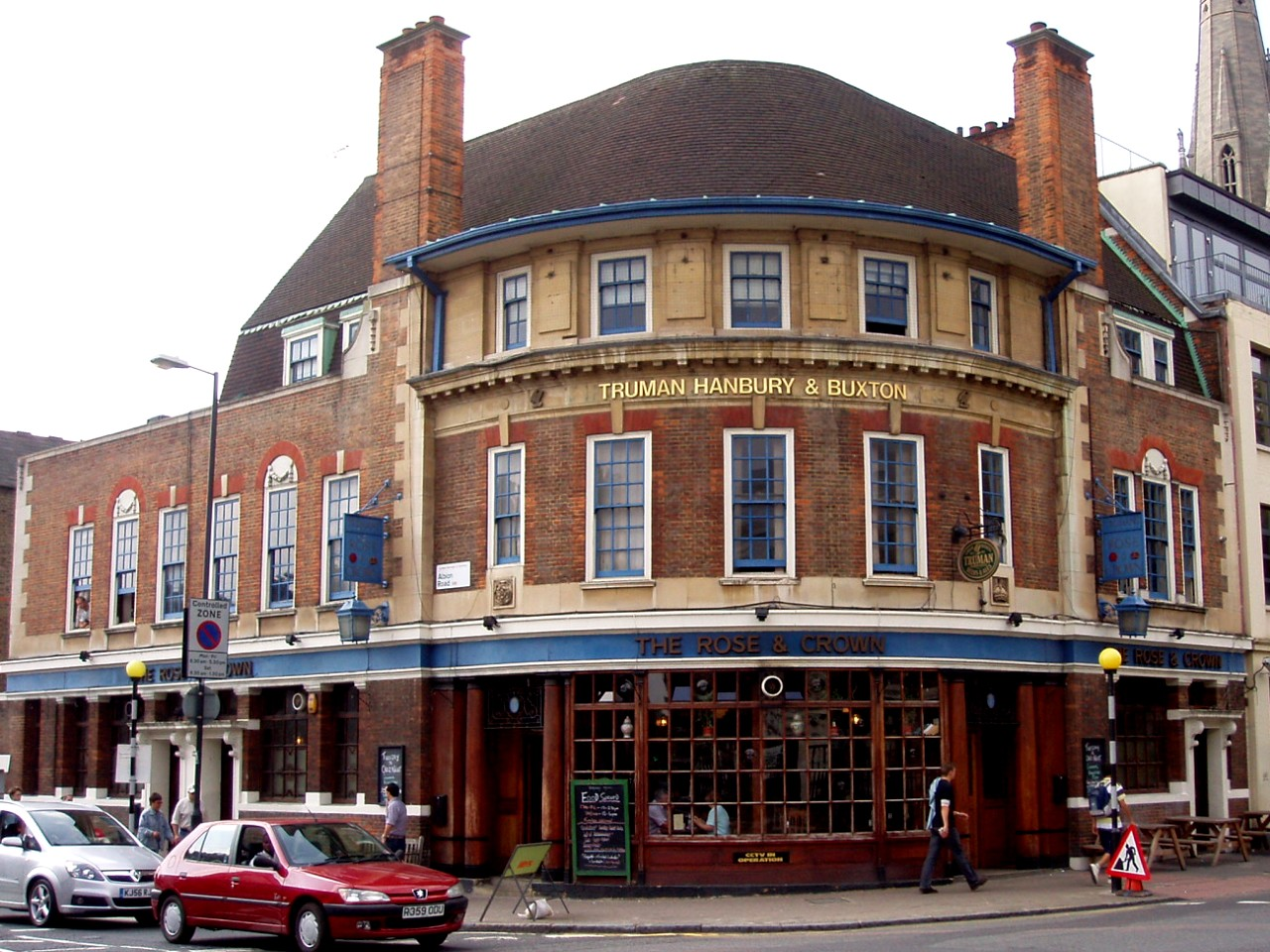
The Rose and Crown, Stoke Newington.

In 1930–32, he designed the Rose and Crown, Stoke Newington, a Grade II listed pub at 199 Stoke Newington Church Street, Stoke Newington, for Truman's Brewery.

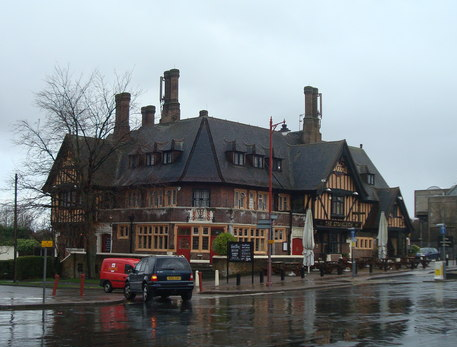
The Station, Stoneleigh. A neo-Tudor design.

In 1931, he designed The Railway Hotel in Station Road, Edgware, for Truman Hanbury Buxton, which Pevsner described as "the most exuberant of their neo-Tudor inns, complete with half-timbering, clustered brick-stacks, carved bargeboards and decorative rainwaterheads".

The Goat, Forty Hill, Enfield, (1932) was a neo-Tudor design with "picturesque chimneystacks and intricately carved bargeboards".

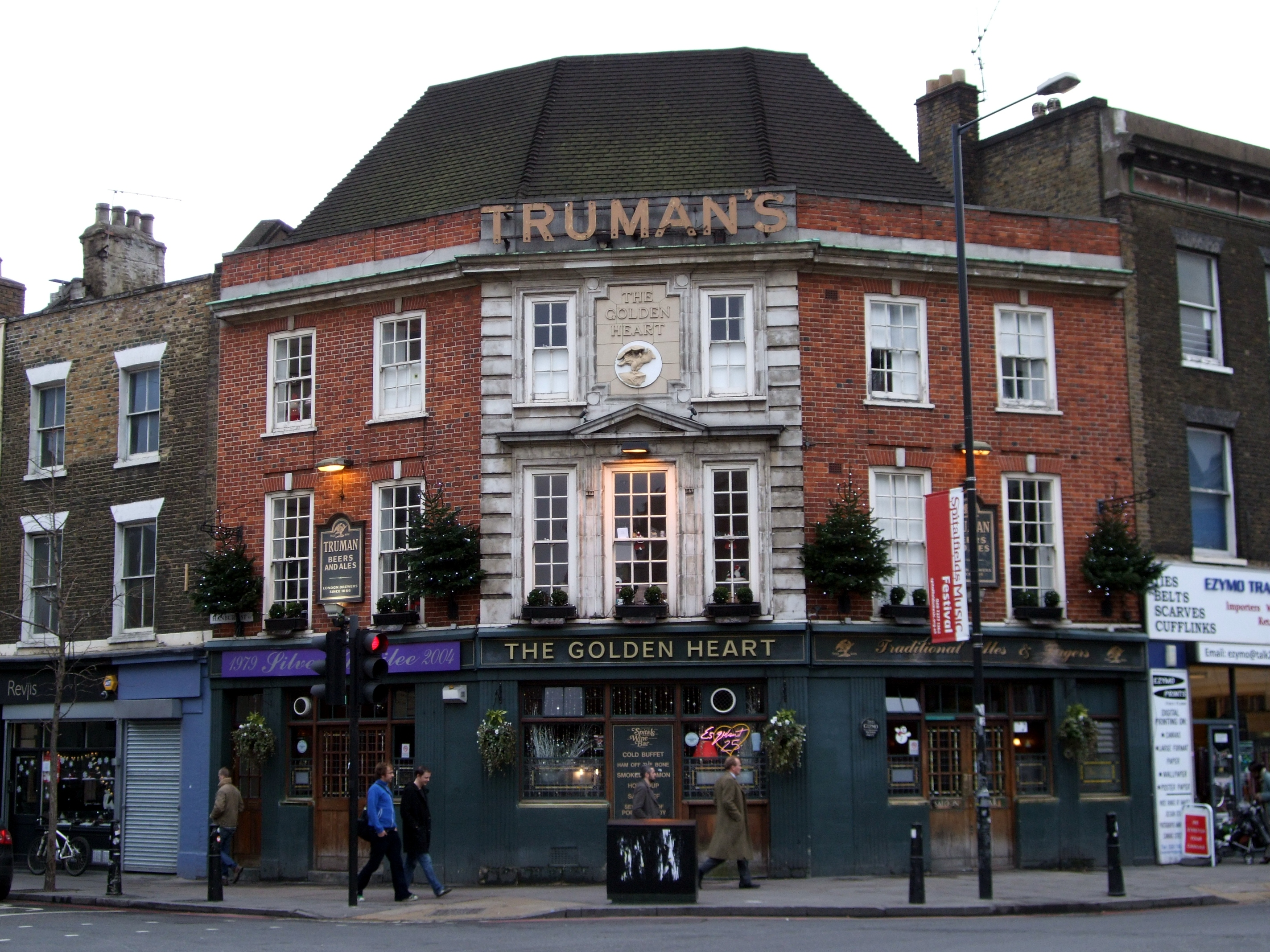
The Golden Heart, Spitalfields.

In 1934–35, he designed The Station, Stoneleigh, a Grade II listed pub at Stoneleigh Broadway, Stoneleigh, Epsom, Surrey.

In 1935–36, he designed The Stag's Head in Hoxton, London.

In 1936, he designed the Golden Heart, Spitalfields, a Grade II listed public house at 110 Commercial Street, London, E1 6LZ, for Truman's Brewery.

In 1936–37, he designed The Green Man in Kingsbury, north London.

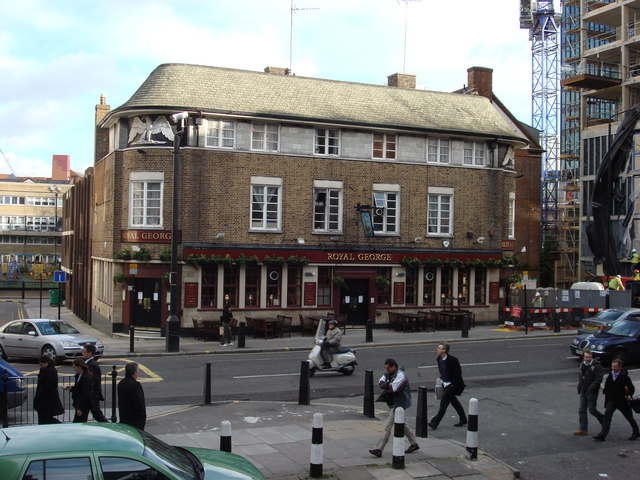
The Royal George, Euston (Sewell's last known pub design)

In 1937, he designed the Duke of Edinburgh at Brixton.

== Legacy ==
Several of the pubs designed by Sewell have been listed by Historic England and four pubs designed by him were included in the 19 inter-war pubs listed in August 2015.
