= Golden Heart (disambiguation) =

Golden Heart is the debut solo studio album by British singer-songwriter and guitarist Mark Knopfler.

Golden Heart may also refer to:

- Golden Heart trilogy, three film by Lars von Trier
- Order of the Golden Heart of Kenya
- Order of the Golden Heart, Philippines
- Golden Heart, Spitalfields, London, UK
- Golden Heart award
- Golden Heart Tour
- Golden Heart trigger, a fish
- Golden Heart Farm, New York, USA
