= Stoke Newington Church Street =

Street in the London Borough of Hackney

Coordinates: 51°33′40″N 0°04′57″W

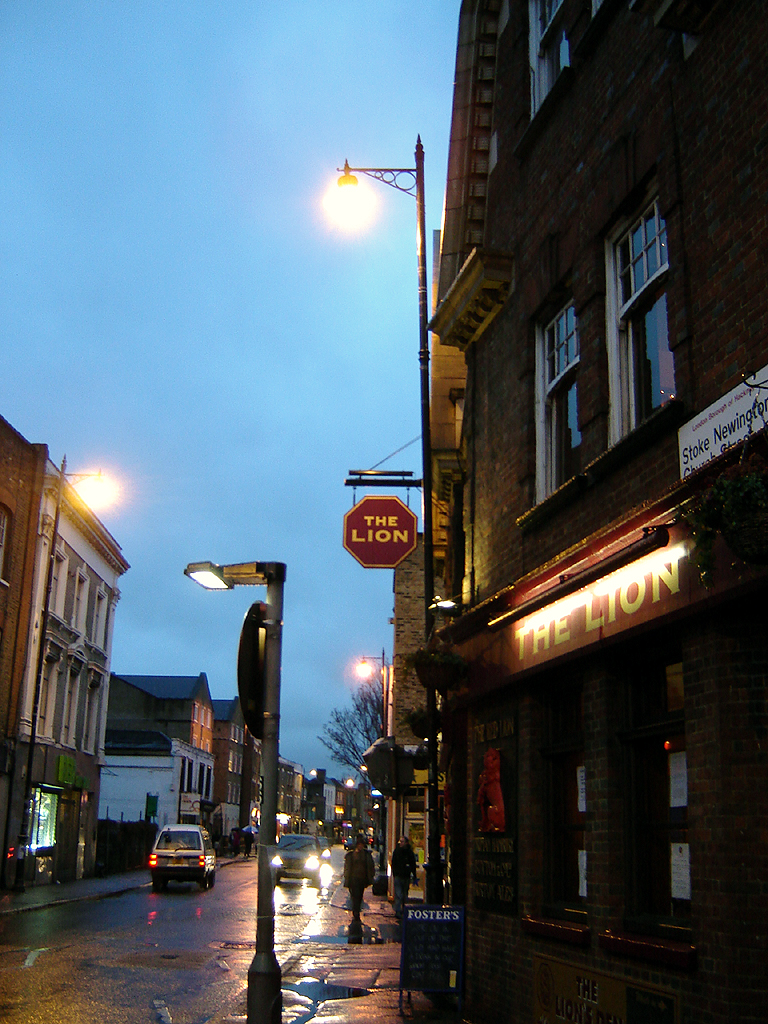
Stoke Newington Church Street, looking west. (March 2006)

Stoke Newington Church Street is a road in north London of the borough of Hackney. The road links Green Lanes (A105) in the west to Stoke Newington High Street (the A10, formerly Ermine Street), in the east. Stoke Newington is one of the villages swallowed by the growth of London in the 19th century, and Church Street retains some of this neighbourhood feel, with many restaurants, pubs, and independent (non-chain) shops.

== History and naming ==
First noted in 1329, what is now Stoke Newington Church Street was recorded as Newington or Newton Lane in 1403, then Church Street in 1576 and as the current name from 1937, making it the longest-used street name in Greater London.

Various parts of the street have had different names in the past. On the south side and starting in the west at Green Lanes, the section up to Clissold Crescent was the site of Newington Hall. The next section, occupying almost all of the street from Clissold Crescent to Clissold Road, was known as Paradise Row (now 229-249 Stoke Newington Church Street). A large part of this is occupied today by Kennaway Estate: Garland House (built 1953) is on the site of The Willows, while Millington House (built 1937) is on the site of Paradise House. Paradise House had a long association with the Quaker community, being the birthplace of Samuel Hoare Jr and later occupied by William Allen. The abolitionist Thomas Clarkson described it as "The very first house in the country, about London, in which I was received and encouraged, in my early pursuits in the cause of the Abolition of the Slave Trade...". One of its final incarnations before demolition was as Paradise House School.

Continuing east from Paradise Row to Clissold Road, the next property was Glebe Place. This is now occupied by Gaskin House, Manton House, Thoresby House and Lloyd House, built by the London County Council around the same time as Millington House. (All of these blocks of flats are named after former rectors of Stoke Newington.) The current Spensley Walk was previously Park Crescent. The section from Albion Road to Woodlea Road was Sister's Place and beyond Defoe Road were Abney Place and Langel Place.

== Description ==
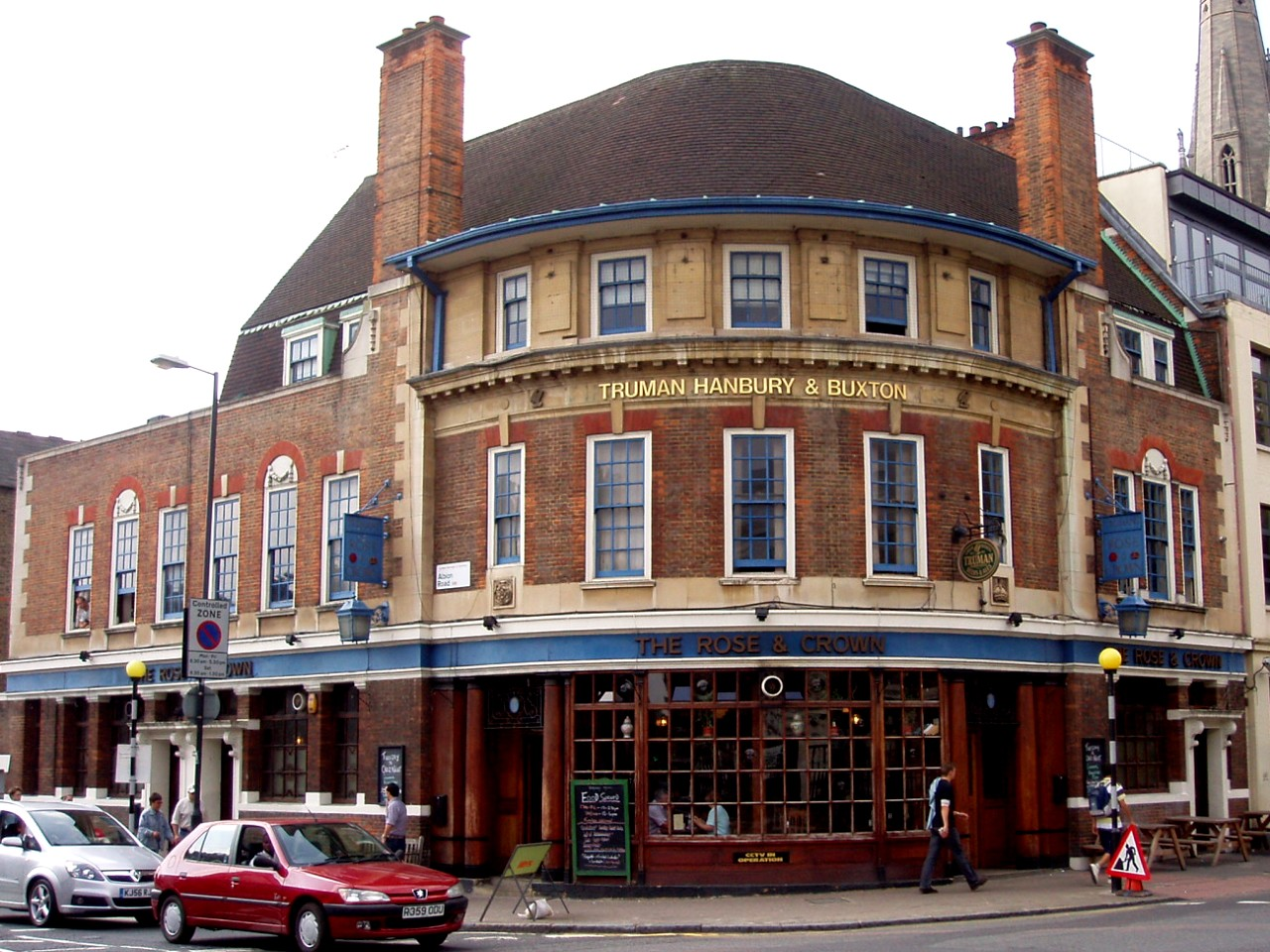
The Rose and Crown, 2007

Clissold Park marks one end of Church Street. Near to it, at the junction with Albion Road, is the municipal town hall and assembly hall of the old Borough of Stoke Newington, refurbished during 2009-10. Abney Park Cemetery, set up as a non-conformist cemetery and arboretum in 1840 on the site of parkland of the same name and now run as a nature reserve, has an entrance on the street. This is next to the fire station, which was built on the site of Fleetwood House and Abney House, where Newington Academy for Girls, an innovative Quaker girls' school, ran from 1824. It commissioned the world's first school bus, which ran from Church Street to Gracechurch Street meeting house in the City, taking the pupils to worship.

There are two churches on the street, both known as Saint Mary’s. The first, St Mary's Old Church, was built in 1563 and was partially rebuilt in the 19th century and then again in the 1950s after heavy bomb damage during World War II. The second church is the impressive mid-Victorian St Mary's New Church with its 250-foot steeple. This church, designed by Sir George Gilbert Scott, was built in 1858, and completed in 1890.

The street has become famous for its large number of public houses and restaurants providing a wide range of food, drink and entertainment. There are a number of licensed venues serving alcohol and hosting live music. For entertainment Ryan’s Bar and the Auld Shillelagh have live music licences. The Daniel Defoe pub (named after the author of Robinson Crusoe, who lived nearby) offers a good range in real ales and has a passable beer garden. The Rose and Crown is a Grade II listed pub built in 1930-32, and designed for Truman's Brewery by their in-house architect A. E. Sewell. For dining, the two Rasa restaurants offer Kerala cuisine (Rasa Travancore not being vegetarian), Il Bacio and Il Bacio Express specialise in Italian cuisine. Other popular places include the Spence bakers for a good range of breads.

In addition to public houses and restaurants, the street is also home to a wide range of independent shops and boutiques offering unusual craft items, jewellery, cutlery, musical instruments, and clothes.

== Notable residents ==
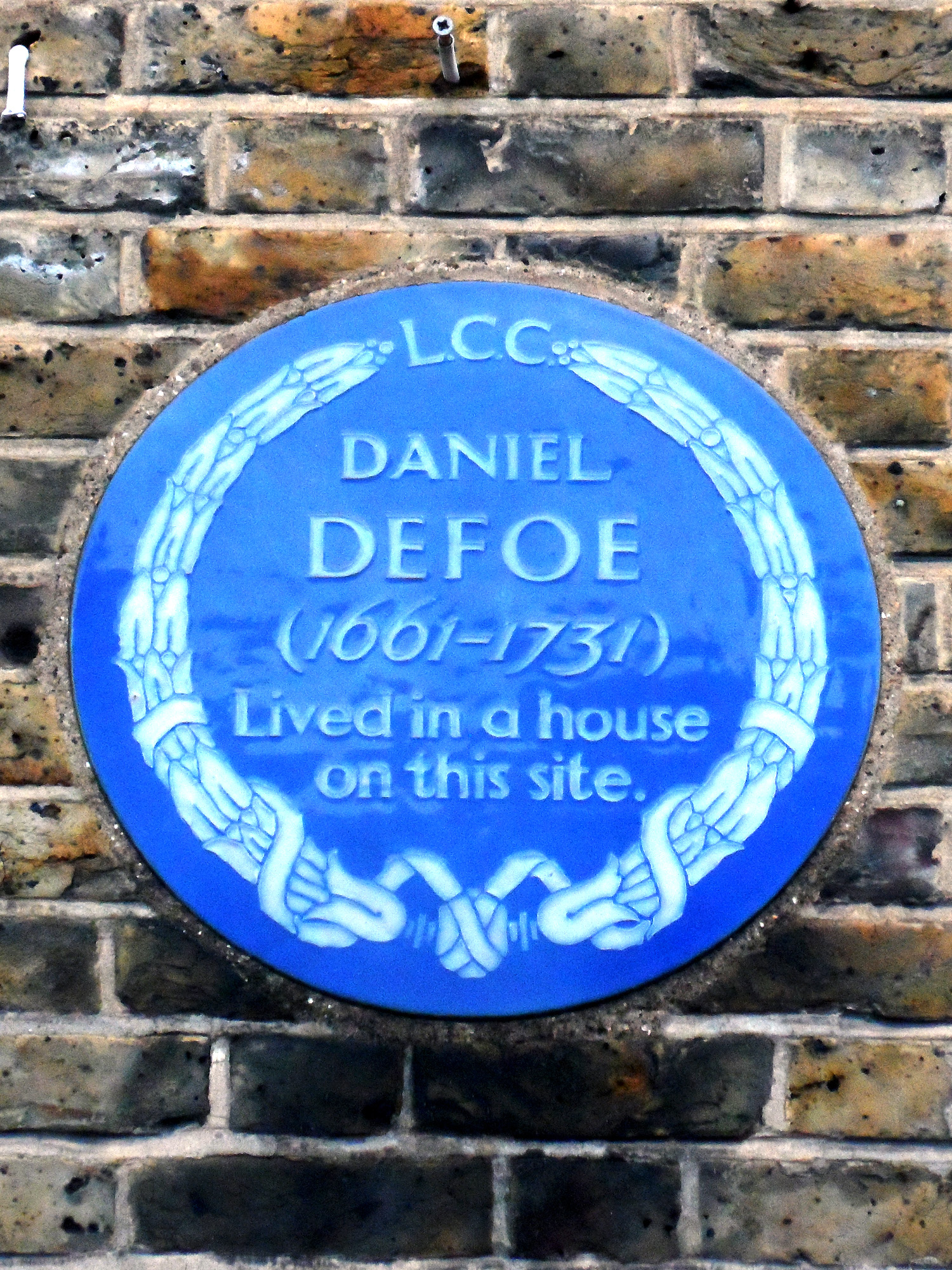
Blue plaque erected in 1932 by London County Council at 95 Stoke Newington Church Street commemorating Daniel Defoe

- William Allen Quaker abolitionist, scientist, and Fellow of the Royal Society
- Daniel Defoe author
- Anna Laetitia Barbauld English poet, essayist, literary critic and author
- John Young architect
- Thurston Moore guitarist and founding member of rock band Sonic Youth
