= Railway Hotel, Edgware =

Building in Edgware, London

Coordinates: 51°36′40.61″N 0°16′40.36″W

Railway Hotel
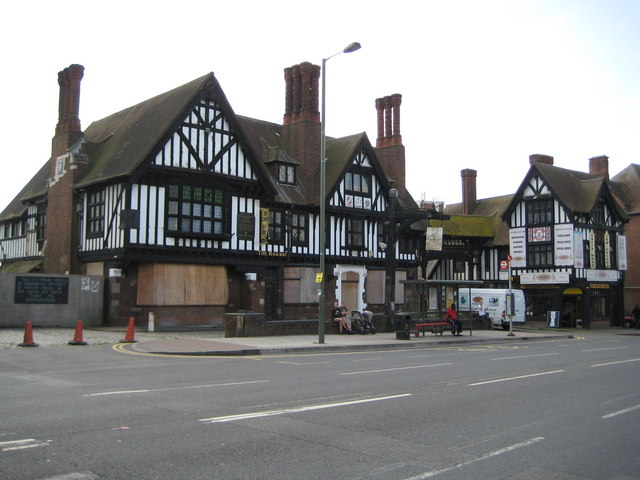
- Interactive map of the Railway Hotel area

General information
- Location: 38-40 Station Rd, Edgware HA8 7AB, London
- Opening: 1932
- Closed: 2006

Design and construction
- Architect: A. E. Sewell

The Railway Hotel is a former pub and hotel in Station Road, Edgware and a Grade II listed building with Historic England.

== History ==
The Railway Hotel was built and designed in 1931 by the architect A. E. Sewell for Truman Hanbury Buxton, brewers, and opened in 1932.

The historic building closed in 2006 after not reaching health and safety standards. In 2013, the building was added to Historic England's Heritage At Risk register. On 11 July 2016, having been empty, the building caught fire in the early morning.

== Damage and uncertainty ==
Through the 2010s there were several owners, none making any significant progress. In 2016 an arson attack left a portion of the ground floor destroyed, and the public began to fear developers would build new apartments after a lack of support from the council.

A petition was launched in 2016 to Historic England in an attempt to try to restore the building, and received 2,287 signatures.

Announced in 2017, the building was listed for public auction with a minimum value of £2 million.

== Renovation ==
In September 2018, it was announced that the building would be renovated and turned into a restaurant. Work on this was reported to be underway, although it has yet to be completed as of 2026.

== Replacement by new developments ==
A development planning application for the Railway Hotel and Forumside site was submitted in September 2026 (Barnet Planning portal application 26/0536/FUL). Five buildings, up to 26 storeys, and 767 housing units, as well as some commercial, are to be developed at the site. The closing date for comments was 24 September 2026.
