= In Love Again (Ex-Void album) =

Studio album by Ex-Void
- Released: 17 January 2025
- Genre: Indie rock
- Length: 36:07
- Label: Tapete

Ex-Void chronology
Bigger Than Before (2022)	In Love Again (2025)

In Love Again is the second studio album by London-based indie rock band Ex-Void. It was released on 17 January 2025, via Tapete Records.

== Background ==
The album was announced in September 2024 by the band together with the first single "Swansea".

"Lonely Girls" is a cover of a song by American alternative country musician Lucinda Williams.

== Reception ==
Professional ratings
Review scores
Source	Rating
AllMusic	4/5 stars
New Noise Magazine	4/5 stars

AllMusic described In Love Again as "a buzzy indie pop delight, full of surprises that pay off handsomely." The Guardian stated about the album "In Love Again, meanwhile, was born out of the principals' two recent breakups and occupies itself with all that pain, all those feelings. All of indie rock seems to be contained within these 10 tracks, alchemised into buzzy, saturated, melodic gold," while New Noise Magazine wrote "This may not be the record fans of Joanna Gruesome expected to hear from two of their alumni, but it’s certainly one they should be grateful for," giving it four out of five stars.

Mojo reviewed the album, stating "One of those bracing, snarky, crafted and fun records that reminds you of a bunch of old favourites while simultaneously exerting its own personality," while Uncut wrote "They take a clear delight in topping their scrappy indie-pop tunes with folk-rock vocal harmonies."

== Track listing ==
All tracks are written by Alanna McArdle and Owen Williams, except "Lonely Girls" (written by Lucinda Williams).

No.	Title	Length
1.	"Swansea"	3:29
2.	"In Love Again"	4:06
3.	"July"	4:09
4.	"Nightmare"	4:11
5.	"Pinhead"	2:37
6.	"Lonely Girls"	2:45
7.	"Sara"	3:14
8.	"Strange Insinuation"	3:21
9.	"Down the Drain"	3:50
10.	"Outline"	4:25
Total length:		36:07

== Personnel ==
Credits adapted from Tidal.

=== Ex-Void ===
- Lan McArdle – guitar, vocals
- Owen Williams – guitar, vocals
- Laurie Foster – bass
- George Rothman – drums

=== Additional contributors ===
- Joe Caithness – mastering
- Rachel Kenedy – engineering
- Sam Ayres – engineering
- J.M.K.E. – artwork
