= Cotton Crown =

Studio album by The Tubs
- Released: 7 March 2025
- Genre: Jangle pop; punk rock
- Length: 29:55
- Language: English
- Label: Trouble in Mind

The Tubs chronology
Dead Meat (2023)	Cotton Crown (2025)

Cotton Crown is the second studio album by British indie rock and punk rock band the Tubs, released by Trouble in Mind on 7 March 2025. The album's cover is composed mostly of a photograph of the band's songwriter Owen Williams' musician mother Charlotte Greig breastfeeding him in a graveyard as a baby. It had originally been used as on the cover of a single she released in 1992 called Crow Country.

== Reception ==
Kitty Empire of The Observer gave the album a very positive review, calling it "superb" and "exceptional". Paste's Jeff Yerger stated that the album was moving and never dour despite its subject matter. Ryan Dillon of Glide magazine believes that with the sophomore album the band solidifies their position in the "modern rock lexicon". Patrick Gill of PopMatters expressed that "despite dealing with some heavy issues, Cotton Crown chooses cheerful sounds over any lingering discomfort". BrooklynVegan's Bill Pearis felt that the album was very similar to the bands first, but also expressed that it was not an issue as the songs are so catchy. Stevie Chick of Mojo praised Williams' "self-lacerating introspection [...] often characterised by bleak wit" as compelling, and said album closer "Strange" "showcases an insight and maturity that promises much for his future as a songwriter".

== Track listing ==
1. "The Thing Is" – 3:26
2. "Freak Mode" – 2:12
3. "Illusion" – 2:02
4. "Narcissist" – 3:57
5. "Chain Reaction" – 2:51
6. "Embarrassing" – 3:24
7. "One More Day" – 4:14
8. "Fair Enough" – 3:38
9. "Strange" – 4:16

== Charts ==
Chart performance for Cotton Crown
Chart (2025)	Peak position
Scottish Albums (Official Charts)	73
UK Album Downloads (Official Charts)	34
UK Independent Albums (Official Charts)	16
