= Golden Heart, Spitalfields =

Pub in Spitalfields, London

Coordinates: 51.520146°N 0.074215°W

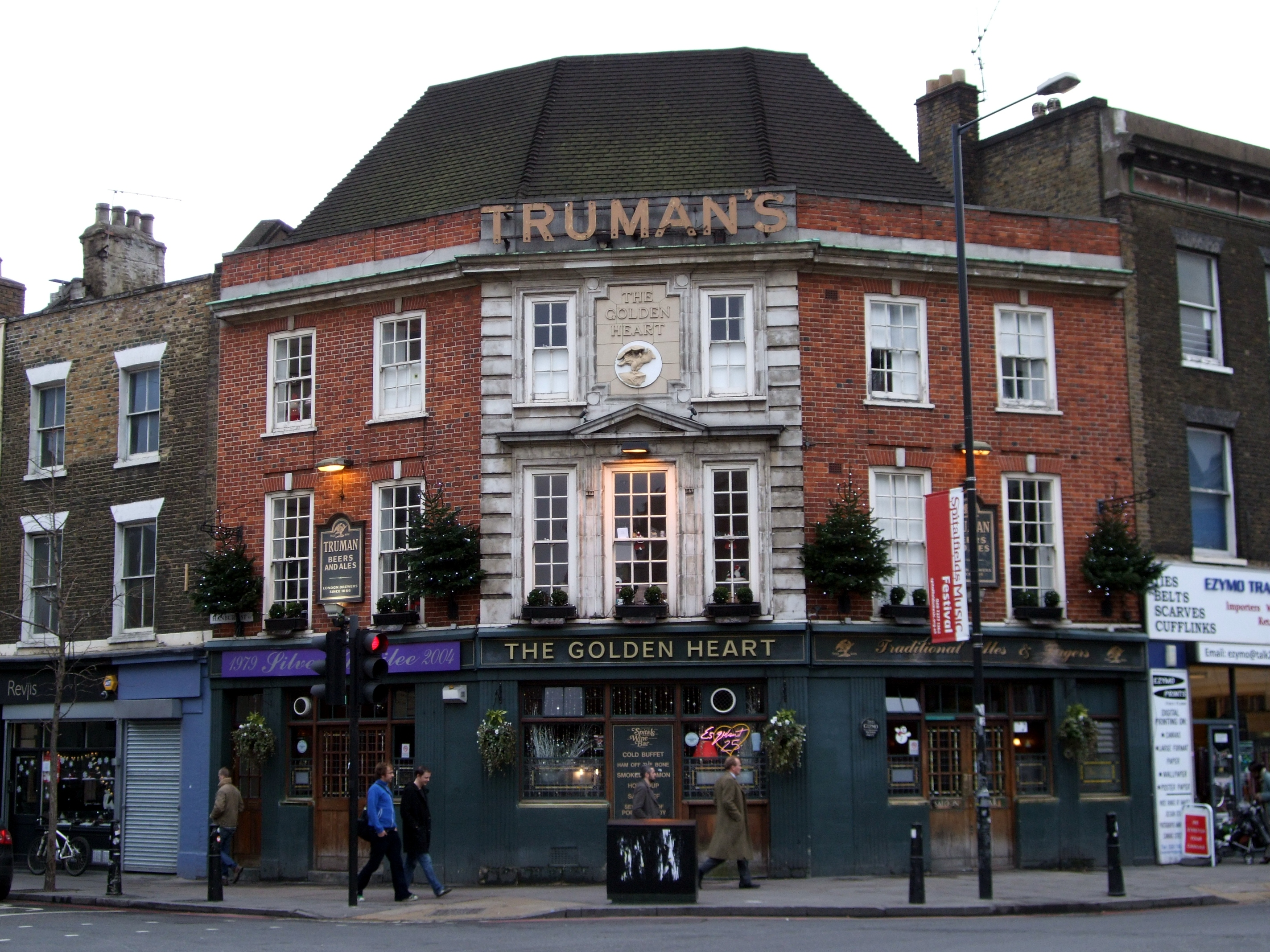
The Golden Heart, 2007

The Golden Heart is a Grade II listed public house in Spitalfields in the London Borough of Tower Hamlets, at 110 Commercial Street, London E1 6LZ. It was built in 1936 for Truman's Brewery, and designed by their in-house architect A. E. Sewell. In 2015, Historic England gave it a Grade II listing, saying that "its largely unaltered interior is one of the best surviving examples of Truman’s in-house style of the 1930s, illustrating many facets of an ‘improved’ pub".
