= The Tubs =

British indie rock band

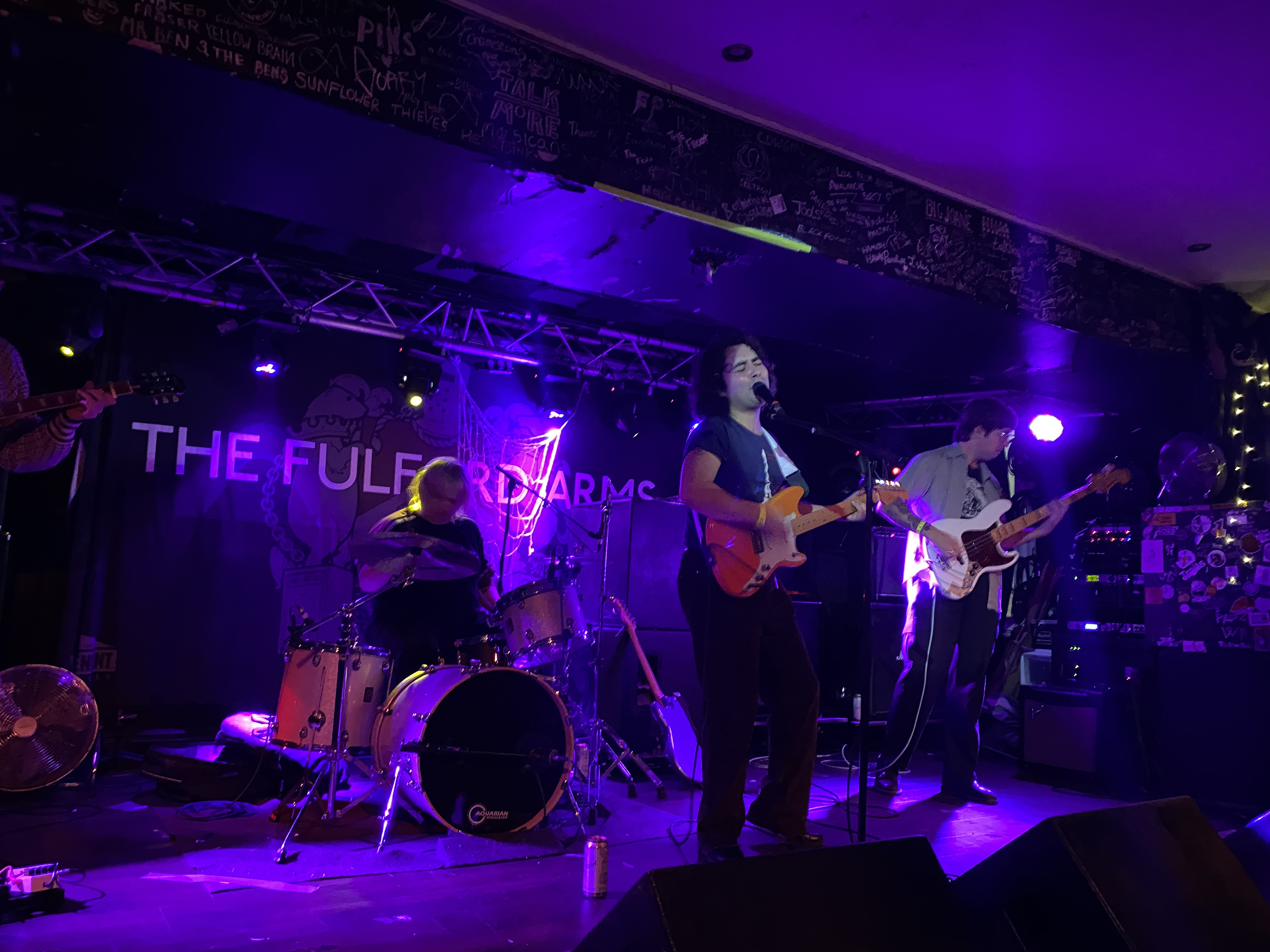
- The Tubs at Fulford Arms, York in October 2023

Background information
- Origin: Cardiff, Wales
- Years active: 2018–present
- Spinoff of: Joanna Gruesome
- Members: Owen Williams; Dan Lucas; Max Warren; Taylor Stewart
- Past members: George Nicholls; Matthew Green; Steve Stonholt

The Tubs are a Welsh indie rock band from Cardiff, formed in 2018. The band was founded by Owen Williams (vocals, guitar) and original guitarist George Nicholls. Along with Max Warren (bass) they were previously members of Joanna Gruesome. The current lineup is completed by Dan Lucas (guitar) and Taylor Stewart (drums).

They have released two full-length albums, and two EPs, all on independent record labels.

== History ==
Owen Williams and George Nicholls were long time friends who formed the indie noise band Joanna Gruesome in 2010 and achieved some cult success. The band split up in 2017 and Williams went on to form the band Ex Vöid with singer Lan McArdle. They continued to work together in the GN Band and Sniffany & The Nits.

The duo initially claimed that they formed The Tubs in 2018 after Williams and Nicholls were trapped in a Welsh caravan park in a storm and started writing songs to pass the time, but later admitted this wasn't true. The band was fleshed out with additional guitarist Steve Stonholt, drummer Matthew Green and (also ex-Joanna Gruesome) bassist Max Warren. They released their debut single I Don't Know How It Works in February 2020 and followed it up with an EP Names in July 2021.

The band slimmed to a four piece and their debut album Dead Meat was released in January 2023 on Trouble In Mind records, receiving generally positive reviews. According to the review aggregator Metacritic, Dead Meat received "generally favorable reviews" based on a weighted average score of 78 out of 100 from five critic scores. and featuring on several year end lists including Mojo, Stereogum and The Observer’s Kitty Empire's top 10.

Comedian and actor Mark Proksch appeared in a video for their 2023 track Round the Bend.

In October 2024 the band announced their second album, Cotton Crown, would be released on 7 March 2025 on Trouble In Mind. This album, like the last, features backing vocals from Williams' Ex-Vöid bandmate Lan McArdle. In December 2024 Nicholls left the band to focus on his career. The band announced via Instagram in January 2025 that Dan Lucas of the band Bull had joined on guitar in replacement.

== Musical style ==
Their music has been described as influenced by 1980s college rock bands such as R.E.M., Pylon and The Chills and British folk rock, with Williams' voice having been likened to that of Richard Thompson.

== Gob Nation ==
The Tubs are part of a loose collective of groups, collectively known as Gob Nation. As well as playing in The Tubs, members play in other bands such as Ex-Vöid, The Snivellers, The GN Band, Garden Centre, PC World and Sniffany & the Nits. The collective's work extends to running a music studio, video production and even a publishing imprint for poetry and lyrics.

== Discography ==
=== Albums ===
- Dead Meat (Trouble in Mind, 2023)
- Cotton Crown (Trouble in Mind, 2025)
- Hard Life (Merge, 2026)

=== Singles ===
- I Don't Know How It Works (Prefect, 2020)
- Names EP (Prefect, 2021)
