= Seems Unfair =

Studio album by Trust Fund
- Released: 30 October 2015
- Recorded: March 2015
- Studio: MJ's Suburban Home studio, Leeds
- Length: 29:36
- Label: Turnstile

Trust Fund chronology
| No One's Coming for Us (2015) | Seems Unfair (2015) | We Have Always Lived in the Harolds (2016) |

Seems Unfair is the second studio album by English band Trust Fund, released in October 2015 on Turnstile Records.

== Background and release ==
In 2014 Trust Fund signed to Bristolian record label Turnstile Records, and the band released their debut studio album No One's Coming For Us in February 2015. Before their debut had been released, Jones had started writing the songs for Seems Unfair. He was concurrently writing a PhD on the DIY scene in the UK.

Seems Unfair was recorded in Leeds in March 2015 and was released by Turnstile on 30 October that same year. Trust Fund also published the album for download on their Bandcamp page under a creative commons license.

== Themes ==
Jones told DIY that "There's nothing in your face about the politics of this record, but the idea of having individuality and even free will next to the stronghold of capitalism is there in the background...No-one's lives are that explicitly political, but you sort of feel the tensions in quite an emotional and human way. I'm trying to write about that."

== Critical reception ==
Professional ratings
Aggregate scores
| Source | Rating |
|---|---|
| AnyDecentMusic? | 7.2/10 |
| Metacritic | 77/100 |
Review scores
| Source | Rating |
| DIY | 4/5 stars |
| Drowned in Sound | 8/10 |
| The Line of Best Fit | 8.5/10 |
| Pitchfork | 6.8/10 |
| Record Collector | 4/5 stars |
| Rolling Stone | 3.5/4 stars |
| The Skinny | 4/5 stars |

On review aggregator Metacritic the album holds a score of 77/100, based on 6 reviews, indicating a "generally favorable" reception. Grace Birnstengel of Stereogum called the album "perfectly nostalgic and under-produced". Drowned in Sound rated the album 8/10 and called Trust Fund "a band that know exactly where they want to go, and more importantly, how to get there."

Several reviewers compared Seems Unfair favourably to Trust Fund's debut album No One's Coming For Us, which was also released in 2015. Nick Roseblade of Drowned in Sound wrote that "Seems Unfair not only trumps No One's Coming for Us lyrically, but musically too," and DIY called the album "a rather more distinctive step forward." Dave Beech of the Line of Best Fit said that "the band's songwriting has come on leaps and bounds in the eight months between releases" and that "Seems Unfair manages [to] exceed its predecessor in every way whilst never shedding any of the DIY charm that made their debut so endearing to begin with." Pitchfork attributed the change in sound partly to the production work of MJ from Hookworms.

== Track listing ==
| No. | Title | Length |
|---|---|---|
| 1. | "Michal's Plan" | 1:31 |
| 2. | "Football" | 2:56 |
| 3. | "4th August" | 3:10 |
| 4. | "Mother's Day" | 2:00 |
| 5. | "Seems Unfair" | 3:56 |
| 6. | "Dreams" | 2:11 |
| 7. | "Dreamers" | 3:10 |
| 8. | "Scared II" | 3:48 |
| 9. | "Big Asda" | 2:32 |
| 10. | "Can You Believe" | 4:23 |
| Total length: | | 29:36 |

== Personnel ==
- Trust Fund – "ellis, roxy, stefano, and dan"
- Alanna McArdle – vocals on "Dreams"
