= Ex-Void =

British indie pop band

Ex-Vöid
- Origin: London, England
- Genres: Indie rock; indie pop; power pop; punk rock
- Years active: 2018–2025
- Labels: Prefect Records; Don Giovanni Records; Tapete Records
- Spinoff of: Joanna Gruesome
- Past members: Lan McArdle; Owen Williams; Laurie Foster; George Rothman; Jonny Coddington

Ex-Void, often stylised as Ex-Vöid, was a London-based indie rock band formed by songwriters Lan McArdle and Owen Williams in 2018. The pair had both previously been in the band Joanna Gruesome. They released two full-length albums and one EP on independent record labels before announcing their split in 2025.

== History ==
As with their previous band, and Williams' other band The Tubs, a humorous and fictional formation story was given to the music press. This time involving Williams and McArdle running into each other at a contemporary dance class, beginning to write songs during breaks there, and assembling a band out of other students. The band's name was influenced partly by The Raincoats' song 'The Void,' Black Sabbath's 'Into The Void,' and the punk band Void.

On 11 May 2018 the band released their self-titled debut EP on Don Giovanni Records. This had been preceded by the single "Boyfriend" on 8 May. That June they supported Waxahatchee on her tour of the UK.

On 25 March 2022 Ex-Void released their debut album Bigger Than Before on Don Giovanni Records in the US and Prefect Records in the UK. This was preceded by single "Churchyard" on 25 January.

In 2023 The Guardian wrote about the band as being part of the Gob Nation music collective.

In September 2024 the band released the single "Swansea", and announced their second album In Love Again would be released in January 2025 on Tapete Records.

On 6 October 2025 the band announced they would be breaking up following one final performance on 25 October at The Dome, in Tufnell Park, North London.

== Musical style ==
Their music has been described as indie rock, "scrappy indie-pop" with "folk-rock vocal harmonies", and "shoegazey power-pop".

== Discography ==
=== Albums ===
- Bigger Than Before (2022)
- In Love Again (2025)

=== Singles ===
- "Only One" (2018)
- "Swansea" (2024)

=== Extended plays ===
- Ex-Vöid (2018)
