= Joanna Gruesome =

Welsh band

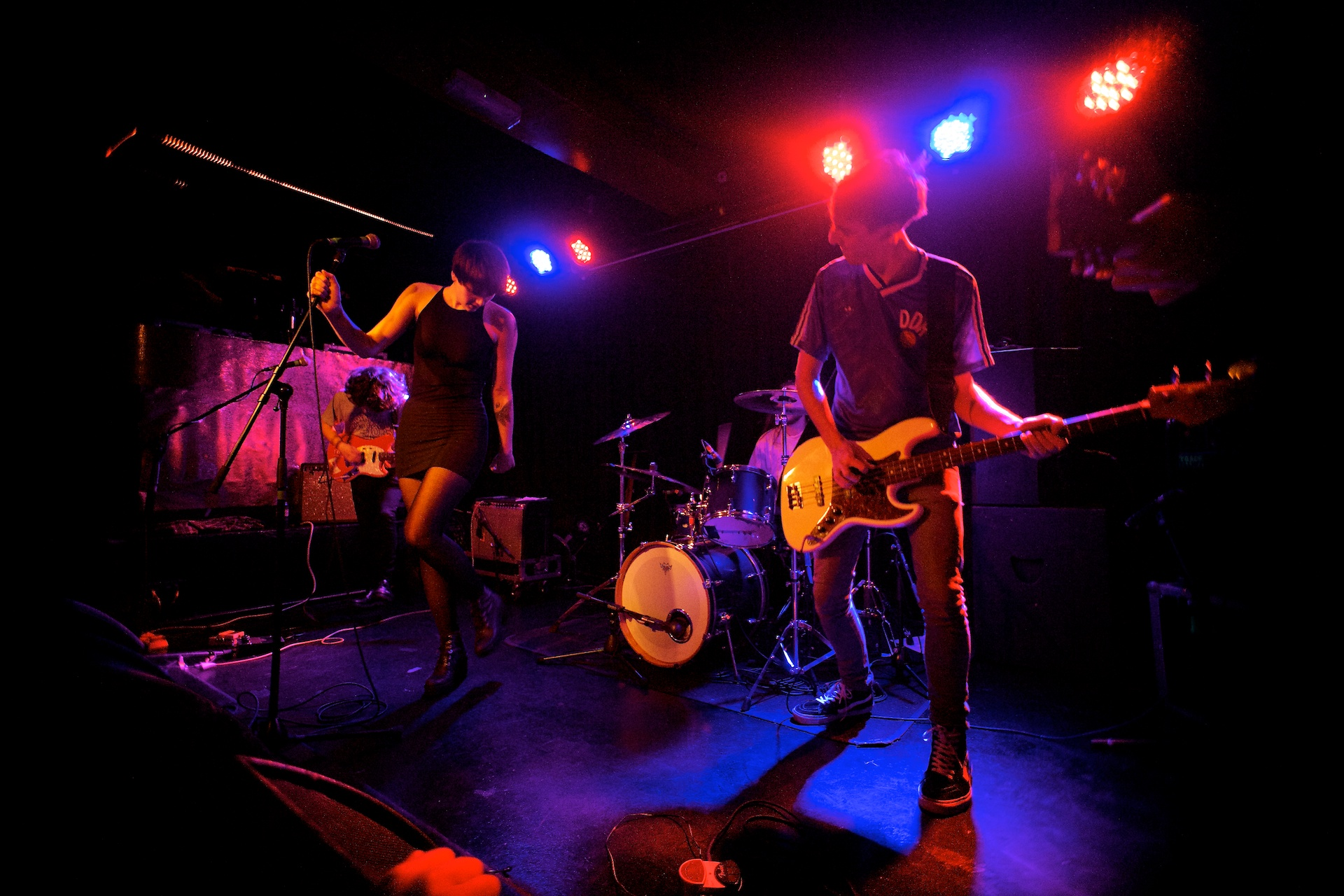

Background information
- Origin: Cardiff, Wales
- Genres: Noise pop; punk rock; indie pop
- Years active: 2010–2017
- Labels: Slumberland Records; Fortuna Pop!
- Spinoffs: Ex-Vöid; The Tubs
- Members: Lan McArdle; Owen Willams; Max Warren; George Nicholls; Dave Sandford; Ciara Killick; Ciara Cohen-Ennis; Matthew Green; Kane Stonestreet; Roxy Brennan
- Website: joannagruesome.bandcamp.com

Joanna Gruesome were a five-piece noise pop band from Cardiff, Wales. The name of the group is a reference to musician Joanna Newsom. They released two albums and a number of singles, were known for their energetic live shows, as well as their forthright feminist and anti-homophobic views.

== History ==
Joanna Gruesome were formed in 2010 in Cardiff by Owen Willams (guitar and vocals), Max Warren (bass), and George Nicholls (guitar). Their core line-up solidified with the addition of Lan McArdle (lead vocals) and Dave Sandford (drums) in 2012. The band would include in their (largely fabricated) press releases that they had met and formed in anger management sessions. Each member adopted the surname 'Gruesome' as a nod to bands like Ramones.

Their debut album, Weird Sister, received praise from Pitchfork, This is fake DIY, and Rough Trade. On 28 November 2014, the band won the Welsh Music Prize for that record. They released their second album, Peanut Butter, on 11 May in the UK via Fortuna Pop!, and on 2 June in the US via Slumberland Records.

In June 2015, the band announced Lan McArdle would depart from the band. They were replaced by Kane Stonestreet from the bands Pennycress and Roxy Brennan from Two White Cranes, Grubs and TOWEL. This lineup released one single, "Pretty Fucking Sick (of It All)." They played their final show in 2017.

Lan McArdle and Owen Williams formed a new band Ex-Vöid in 2018 and Williams and Nicholls formed The Tubs the same year.

== Discography ==
=== LPs ===
| Year | Title | Label | Format |
|---|---|---|---|
| 2013 | Weird Sister | Fortuna Pop! (UK), Slumberland Records (US) | 12-inch vinyl LP / CD / DD |
| 2015 | Peanut Butter | Fortuna Pop! (UK), Slumberland Records (US) | 12-inch vinyl LP / CD / DD |

=== EPs ===
- E.P. – Self Release, MP3 (2011)
- Family Portrait – Art Is Hard Records, 7-inch (2012)
- Cream Soda Grrrl – E.P. reissue – Reeks Of Effort, tape (2012)
- Split (with Trust Fund) – Reeks Of Effort (UK) & Happy Happy Birthday To Me Records (US), 12-inch EP (2014)
- Astonishing Adventures! "The Captured Crusader" (split with Perfect Pussy) – Captured Tracks, Slumberland Records, Fortuna Pop!, 7-inch EP (2014)

=== Singles ===
- Do You Really Wanna Know Why Yr Still In Love With Me – Happy Happy Birthday To Me Records, 7-inch (2012)
- Sugarcrush – Slumberland/Fortuna Pop!, 7-inch Single (2013)
- Pretty Fucking Sick (of it All) - Fortuna Pop!, 7-inch Single (2016)
