= Dead Meat (album) =

Studio album by The Tubs
- Released: 13 January 2023
- Recorded: 2022
- Studio: The Soapworks, South Bermondsey, London, England, United Kingdom
- Genre: Jangle pop; punk rock
- Length: 26:02
- Language: English
- Label: Trouble in Mind

The Tubs chronology
| Names (2021) | Dead Meat (2023) | Cotton Crown (2025) |

Dead Meat is the debut studio album by British indie rock and punk rock band the Tubs, release by Trouble in Mind on 27 January 13, 2023. The album was supported by a tour of British record stores by the band.

== Reception ==
According to the review aggregator Metacritic, Dead Meat received "generally favorable reviews" based on a weighted average score of 78 out of 100 from five critic scores. Editors at AllMusic rated this album 3.5 out of 5 stars, with critic Fred Thomas writing that "the Tubs' neat presentation of their first batch of deceptively complex and solidly constructed tunes" defies strict genre categorization. A feature from BrooklynVegan investigating the band's influences by Bill Pearis characterizes this album as made up of "thrilling two-minute guitar earworms that mash together a few different simpatico genres: punk, post punk, power-pop and British folk". Joey Willis of Glide Magazine called this album "a solid effort that showcases the band's energy, attitude, and ability to blend punk aggression with melodic hooks". In a profile for Mojo, Stevie Chick wrote that the songs on Dead Meat "lay [vocalist Owen Williams'] personality bare, as Williams documents obsession, doomed love and self-loathing with unsparing honesty, over buzzsaw folk rock" and compared the band to Richard Thompson. Evan Rytlewski of Pitchfork rated this release a 7.0 out of 10, summing up that "Dead Meat's sound may be a throwback, but it's so tunefully crafted that it charms the way it did the first time around".

Editors at Stereogum chose this as the 18th best album of 2023. Paste included this among the 30 best rock albums of 2023. Editor-in-chief of Louder Sound Briony Edwards chose this for his album of the year. This was included in the 40 best independent albums of 2023 in BrooklynVegan's Indie Basement.

== Track listing ==
1. "Illusion, Pt. II" – 4:36
2. "Two Person Love" – 2:19
3. "I Don't Know How It Works" – 2:14
4. "Dead Meat" – 1:30
5. "Sniveller" – 4:18
6. "Duped" – 2:09
7. "That's Fine" – 2:33
8. "Round the Bend" – 2:14
9. "Wretched Lie" – 4:09

== Personnel ==
The Tubs

- Matt "Chicken Burger" Green – drums
- George "GN" Nicholls – guitar
- Max "Wozza" Warren – bass guitar
- Owen "O" Williams – guitar, vocals

Additional personnel

- Gus Beamish – synthesizer
- Jonny Coddington – recording, mixing
- J. M. K. E. – illustration
- Alanna McArdle – backing vocals
- Maria Cecilia Tedemalm – photography
- Mikey Young – mastering

== See also ==
- 2023 in British music
- List of 2023 albums
