= Peanut Butter (album) =

Studio album by Joanna Gruesome
- Released: 4 May 2015
- Genre: Noise pop
- Length: 21:38
- Labels: Fortuna Pop! (UK), Slumberland Records (US)

Joanna Gruesome chronology
Weird Sister (2013)	Peanut Butter (2015)

Peanut Butter is the second and final album by Welsh noise-pop band Joanna Gruesome, released in the spring of 2015. It received favorable reviews from critics and is the last album recorded with the lead singer Alanna McArdle before her departure from the band.

== Reception ==
In general, critics praised Peanut Butter as musically tighter, more self-aware, and more stylistically developed than their previous album, Weird Sister. Their distinctive blend of harsh guitar riffs and "bubblegum" vocal harmonies with unexpected chords and progressions is a key feature of this album. The lyrics have been praised for playfully blending "the abstract and the concrete" and for their "hyper-specificity" that pulls from personal experiences to create engaging and enigmatic songs.

== Track listing ==
All tracks are written by Owen Williams, Alanna McArdle, George Nicholls, Max Warren, and David Sandford.

No.	Title	Length
1.	"Last Year"	2:52
2.	"Jamie (Luvver)"	1:41
3.	"Honestly Do Yr Worst"	1:51
4.	"There Is No Function Stacy"	1:58
5.	"Crayon"	3:10
6.	"I Don't Wanna Relax"	2:15
7.	"Jerome (Liar)"	1:39
8.	"Separate Bedrooms"	1:59
9.	"Psykick Espionage"	2:08
10.	"Hey! I Wanna Be Yr Best Friend"	2:01
Total length:		21:38
