= Trust Fund (band) =

British musical project

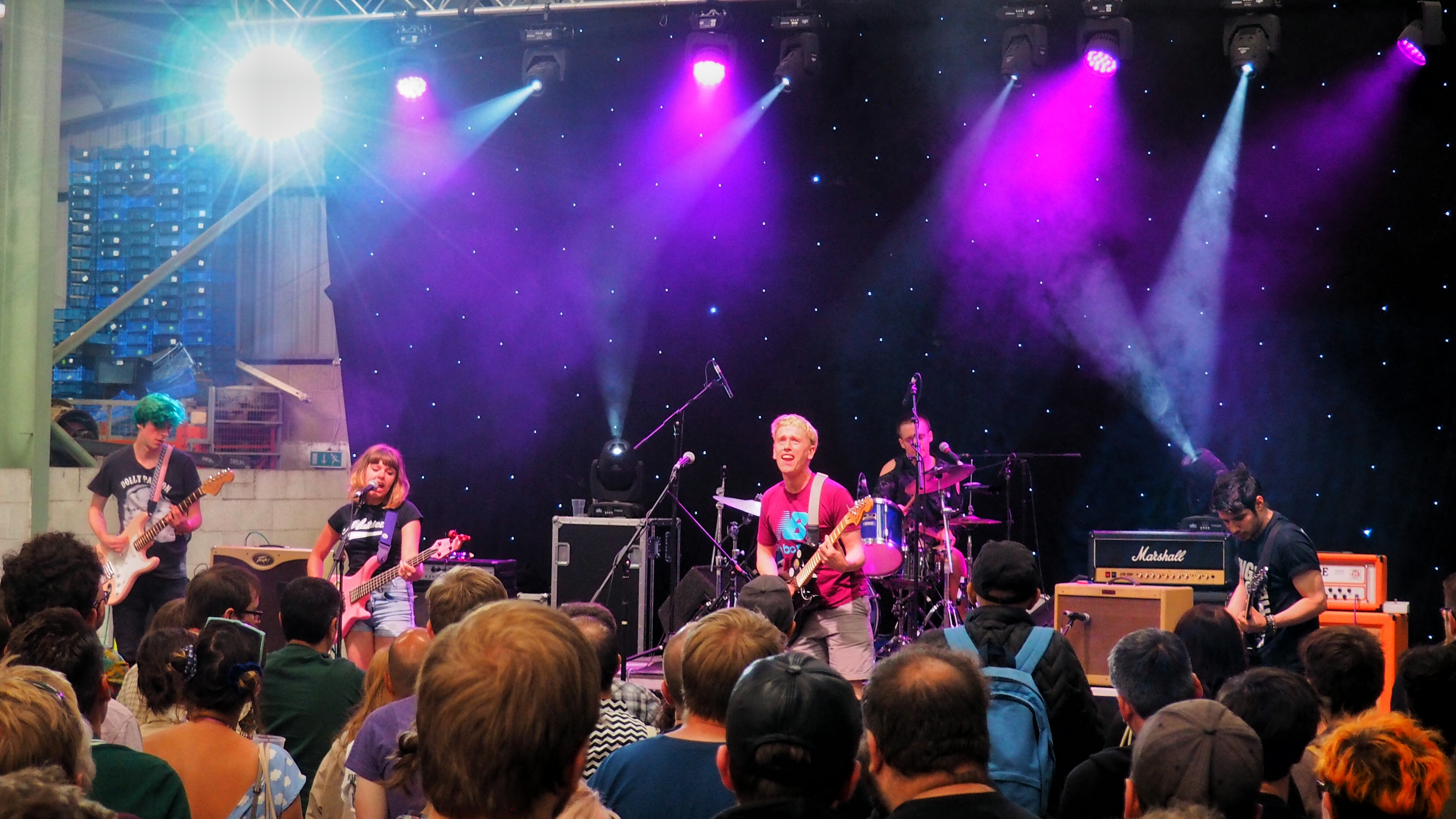
- Trust Fund performing in 2016

Background information
- Origin: Bristol, UK
- Genres: Indie rock; indie pop; folk
- Years active: 2011–2018; 2022–present
- Labels: Turnstile; Reeks of Effort
- Members: Ellis Jones
- Past members: Roxy Brennan; Stefano Belli; Dan Howard; Bert Clark; Grace Denton; Rosie Smith; Alanna McArdle; Libby Clark; O Jones; Robin Gatt; Andrew Stephenson
- Website: trustfund.fun

Trust Fund is a musical project founded and led by Ellis Jones while living in Bristol in the southwest of England. Until 2018, both on recordings and live, the band featured a rotating lineup of musicians. They released four full-length albums, the final of which roughly coincided with the decision to disband. In March 2022, Jones revived the Trust Fund moniker and began releasing new singles under the name, followed by a fifth album in 2024.

== History ==
The band self-released an EP titled I've Been Ages, followed by a second, Don't Let Them Begin, and a split EP with Joanna Gruesome, the latter two issued by Reeks of Effort. In early 2015, they signed to Turnstile Records for the release of their first full-length album, "No One's Coming for Us".

Their next album, Seems Unfair, followed shortly after on the same label in the autumn of 2015.

After a relocation to Leeds, a third album, We Have Always Lived in the Harolds, was released in June 2016. Reverting to home recording, it was also released without a record label. The title is a reference to Shirley Jackson's 1962 novel We Have Always Lived in the Castle, substituting in a group of streets in Leeds collectively known as the Harolds, where Jones lived.

In July 2018, Trust Fund released what was intended to be their fourth and final full-length album, Bringing the Backline.

During their initial period of activity, Trust Fund toured with Los Campesinos!, Speedy Ortiz, and Mitski.

In March 2022, Jones revived the Trust Fund moniker and began releasing new singles under the name. In 2023, Trust Fund again supported Mitski on a tour of cities in the UK and the EU.

On 22 August 2024, Jones announced that Trust Fund would release a new album, Has It Been a While, on 1 November 2024, through Tapete Records.

== Discography ==
=== Albums ===
- No One's Coming for Us (2015)
- Seems Unfair (2015)
- We Have Always Lived in the Harolds (2016)
- Bringing the Backline (2018)
- Has It Been a While (2024)

=== EPs ===
- I've Been Ages (2012)
- Don't Let Them Begin (2013)

=== Split releases ===
- Split EP with Joanna Gruesome (2014)
