= Truman's Brewery =

Large East London brewery

Former Truman pub The Duke of Sussex in Waterloo

Truman's Brewery was a large East London brewery and one of the largest brewers in the world at the end of the 19th century. Founded around 1666, the Black Eagle Brewery was established on a plot of land next to what is now Brick Lane in London, E1. It grew steadily until the 18th century when, under the management of Benjamin Truman, and driven by the demand for porter, it expanded rapidly and became one of the largest brewers in London. Its growth continued into and through the 19th century with the expansion of its brewery and pub estate. In 1873, it purchased Philips Brewery in Burton and became the largest brewery in the world.

The situation changed for Truman's in the 20th century as it had to come to terms with the rise of lager, cheaper competition from imports and the consolidation of the biggest names in British brewing through mergers. Attempts to come to terms with these changes through management restructures and rebranding did not succeed, and in 1989 the brewery was closed.

The Truman's brand was revived in 2010 and, since 2013, beer is again being brewed in East London under the Truman's name. “Black Eagle Brewery” aka Truman’s Brewery has shut down and was bought by Big Penny.

== History ==
=== Early years ===
The original Truman's brew house is generally claimed to have been founded in 1666. However, the historical evidence is not conclusive, with dates ranging from 1663 to 1669. What is clear is that the name came from Joseph Truman, who having previously worked in the brew house, took control of it in the 1680s. Truman's grew under his stewardship, leading to the purchase of more land around the original site and Truman's becoming a fully-fledged brewery. When he died in 1719, his eldest son, also called Joseph, initially succeeded Joseph Truman. However, within a few years control of Truman's passed to the younger son Benjamin Truman.

=== Growth years ===
Truman's flourished under Benjamin Truman, a shrewd businessman blessed with good luck. The latter led to Truman's becoming the drink of the Royal Family. "When the Duchess of Brunswick was born in 1737, the Prince of Wales ordered four loads of faggots and a number of tar barrels to be burned before Carlton House to celebrate the event, and directed the Brewery to his household to place four barrels of beer near it for the use of those who chose to partake in the beverage, which certain individuals had no sooner done than they pronounced the liquid of inferior quality. This declaration caused a revolt: the mob threw the beer in each other’s faces and the barrels into the fire. The Prince had the good nature to order a second bonfire on the succeeding night and procured four barrels of beer from Truman ‘with which the populace was pleased and satisfied’".

Up to this point, breweries had always been relatively small operations. That changed with the development of porter, a heavily hopped beer produced from dark brown malts. It reputedly gained its present name when the landlord of the Old Blue Last in Shoreditch, London (a former Truman's pub) requested that his brewer Harwood, supply the beer ready mixed. The landlord then named the beer after his customers, who were mainly market porters.

Porter was the first beer that could be mass-produced, leading to the rapid expansion of many London breweries. Benjamin Truman invested heavily to increase brewing capacity, and by 1760 Truman's was the third largest brewer of porter in London.

When he died in 1780, Benjamin Truman left no male heir. He left most of the brewery to his grandsons, with the rest going to his head clerk James Grant, who took over the running of the brewery. After Grant's death in 1788, his share was purchased by Sampson Hanbury, who went on to run Truman's for the next 46 years.

Hanbury was one of the most important figures in Truman's history, responsible for bringing in new levels of professionalism and efficiency. He purchased the brewery's first steam engine in 1805, greatly increasing Truman's ability to supply the rest of the country. Renowned for demanding high quality raw materials, under his control Truman's expansion continued apace – porter production doubled between 1800 and 1820 from 100,000 to 200,000 brewers barrels a year.

In 1808, Hanbury's nephew Thomas Fowell Buxton joined the firm and went on to play a big role in Truman's future, as well as leaving his mark on national history. Fresh from a brilliant career at Trinity College, Dublin, the young Buxton was handed control of the ledgers, later taking on responsibility for reorganising the brewery to improve efficiency, which he achieved with great success.

Truman's also proved to be a platform for his work as a social reformer: “He gave much attention to improving the working conditions of his employees. This he did by the simple expedient of employing a school master to teach them and telling his men: ‘This day six weeks I shall discharge every man who cannot read and write’. Not a single man was dismissed”.

Buxton became an MP in 1818, actively working for social reform in many areas of society, most notably working closely with William Wilberforce as one of the chief campaigners for the abolition of slavery.

Buxton was also responsible for one of the most famous events in Truman's history, hosting the Cabinet Dinner of 1831, when 23 members of the cabinet including the Lord Chancellor, Henry Brougham, and the Prime Minister, Charles Grey, had dinner at the brewery.

“T.F.Buxton had provided a banquet to do justice to such guests, but the Lord Brougham who was always something of an innovator, suggested that the occasion demanded rather steaks and porter. He had his way, and so the meal consisted largely of beef steaks cooked on the furnace of the brewery boiler house.”

This was also a time when Truman's was doing a lot of exporting, primarily to the Netherlands, Denmark and Sweden. It was also supplying the East India Company and the British Army. Export beers were usually specifically made, some of which were later deemed suitable for the domestic market, such as the ‘Export Imperial Stout’ a beer originally brewed for the Russian Court in Saint Petersburg.

The opening of the railway in 1839, connected Burton (the source of the best pale ale) to the rest of the country. During the second half of the 19th century, pale ale became more popular than porter.

Unable to brew pale ale to the same standard (due to the difference in water properties), Truman's looked to strike an agency agreement with one of the Burton brewers. When these approaches were rejected, Truman's bought Phillips brewery outright in 1873. They hired the nation's most renowned brewery architects and engineers to entirely reconstruct the Burton plan, the acquisition of which had made Truman's the world's largest brewer.

The Burton brewery struggled in its first years, but by 1880 it had begun to turn a profit. However, the tide was already starting to turn against Truman's. Though sales and assets continued to grow, financing the business was proving increasingly difficult due to the huge sums of money they had tied up in public houses, as well as the restrictive licensing laws of Gladstone. The need to modernise the brewery created further financial strain as the old porter vats had to be dismantled and replaced equipment more suitable for running pale ales.

In 1888, as part of a bid to raise finance, Truman's became a public limited company.

=== 20th century ===
Truman's continued to grow during the first half of the 20th century, increasing its pub estate and buying up suppliers (especially during the war years when supply of raw materials become particularly important to control). It also invested heavily in motorized vehicles to improve distribution, a development lamented by many as it meant the end for Truman's celebrated draymen.

However, as the century progressed, Truman's began to struggle in the face of competition from imported lagers, as well as from the trend for mergers amongst British breweries. The 1960s proved to be very turbulent years for the British brewing industry, but Truman's took decisive steps that meant by the end of the decade they were the last major independent brewery left in London. During the 1960s they restructured the entire business, which included closing their Burton brewery, rationalised their pub estate and invested heavily in improving their Brick Lane brewery. The measures had the desired effect as profits grew by a third in the last four years of the decade.

However, in 1971 Truman's became the centre of a bidding war between Grand Metropolitan and Watney Mann. Eventually, Grand Metropolitan won and then immediately turned its attention to Watney Mann. Upon taking over Watney Mann, Grand Metropolitan then merged it with Truman's.

Grand Metropolitan made many changes to the company, including changing the name to Truman, creating a new brand, switching to kegs and changing the beer - all decisions that proved to the detriment of the company. These mistakes were realised in the 1980s when casks were brought back along with the traditional Truman's eagle, but the damage had been done and the brewery was shut in 1989.

=== 21st century revival ===
In 2010, the Truman's brand was purchased from Scottish & Newcastle by two London businessmen. After several years of planning, with trial brews produced under contract by Everards Brewery in Leicester and Nethergate Brewery in Essex, a new brewery in Hackney Wick was completed in August 2013. The brewery officially opened in September 2013, and Truman's beer is currently stocked by a number of London pubs. After operating for 9 years in London the brewery became known as Big Penny Beer and the rights to the Truman brand were once again sold, this time to the owners of the original brewing site in Brick Lane.

== Beers ==
Label for Truman's Eagle Ale

The brewery had become successful by brewing porter, and when the popularity of that beer waned in the later part of the 19th century they moved into producing pale ale. In the 20th century they produced brands such as Eagle Ale, Eagle Stout, Light Ale, and Trubrown.
