= Tolka Park =

Football stadium in Dublin, Ireland

Coordinates: 53°22′03″N 6°15′07″W

- Tolka
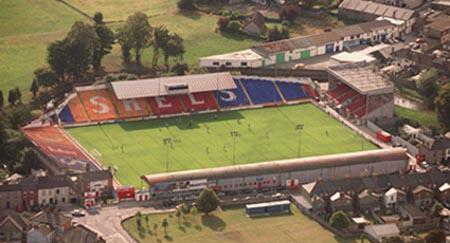

- Location within Dublin
- Full name: Tolka Park
- Location: Drumcondra, Dublin, Ireland
- Capacity: 6,450
- Field size: 110 by 75 yards (101 by 69 m)
- Public transit: Drumcondra railway station

Construction
- Opened: 1924
- Renovated: 2000

Tenants
- Drumcondra F.C. (1950s–1972); Home Farm (1972–1989); Shelbourne (1957-1974, 1976-1982, 1989–); Shamrock Rovers (1987–1988, 2005–2006); Ireland national rugby league team (1998–2006)

Tolka Park (Irish: Páirc na Tulchann) is an Irish association football ground located in the north Dublin suburb of Drumcondra, on the northern banks of the River Tolka. It is the home ground of League of Ireland club Shelbourne men's and women's senior sides with a capacity of 6,450.

The stadium formerly held 9,680 people, but this has been scaled down in recent times due to health and safety regulations in the venue, mainly concerning the 'New' and Ballybough stands. Tolka Park has hosted national cup finals along with international matches, inter-league games, Champions League qualifiers, UEFA Cup Winners' Cup, UEFA Cup, UEFA Conference League, UEFA Youth League ties, Setanta Sports Cup finals and was a host venue for the 1994 UEFA European Under-16 Championship, the 2000 Rugby League World Cup, and the 2019 UEFA European Under-17 Championship. The ground has also in the past been used for boxing championships and basketball.

Shelbourne secured a 250-year lease from Dublin City Council in 2024, which was formally agreed in October 2025. Uncertainty began with the sale of the ground by Shelbourne to businessman Ossie Kilkenny in 2006, the purchase of the ground by Dublin City Council in 2015, and a proposal to redevelop Dalymount Park as a shared home for Shelbourne and Bohemians.

== History ==
Over the years, seven different League of Ireland clubs have used Tolka Park for home league matches on a regular basis. They are Drumcondra, Shelbourne, Dolphin, Home Farm, Dublin City, Shamrock Rovers and St James's Gate.

=== Home Farm Drums ===
Tolka Park was originally home to Drumcondra. When Drumcondra were first elected to the League of Ireland in 1928, the club's home ground was Tolka Park — although it was then known as Richmond Road. Tolka's first League of Ireland game was held on the opening day of the 1928–29 League of Ireland season on 26 August 1928 when newly elected Drumcondra hosted Shamrock Rovers.

In 1929, over 30 people were injured at the ground when a hoarding collapsed at a Leinster Senior Cup tie between Drumcondra and Shelbourne.

The ground hosted the first floodlit fixture in the Republic of Ireland on 30 March 1953 when Drums beat St Mirren. The same year, the reserved stand beside Richmond Road was lengthened and a roof was added at a cost of £2,600. A loan of £1,000 was sought from the FAI to help with construction costs and £750 was granted. The lower grant meant that the stand was lengthened in stages, and a phased construction of the Richmond Road expansion took place. Running from the Drumcondra End to the halfway line, the shape and structure of the roof was largely unchanged as of 2020. On 26 January 1958 Tolka was the venue for the first all-ticket match to be played in the League of Ireland when Drums hosted Shamrock Rovers. Due to crowd issues the match was subsequently abandoned with the points awarded to Rovers. That same year, the first advertising hoardings appeared in Tolka Park which were for Guinness.

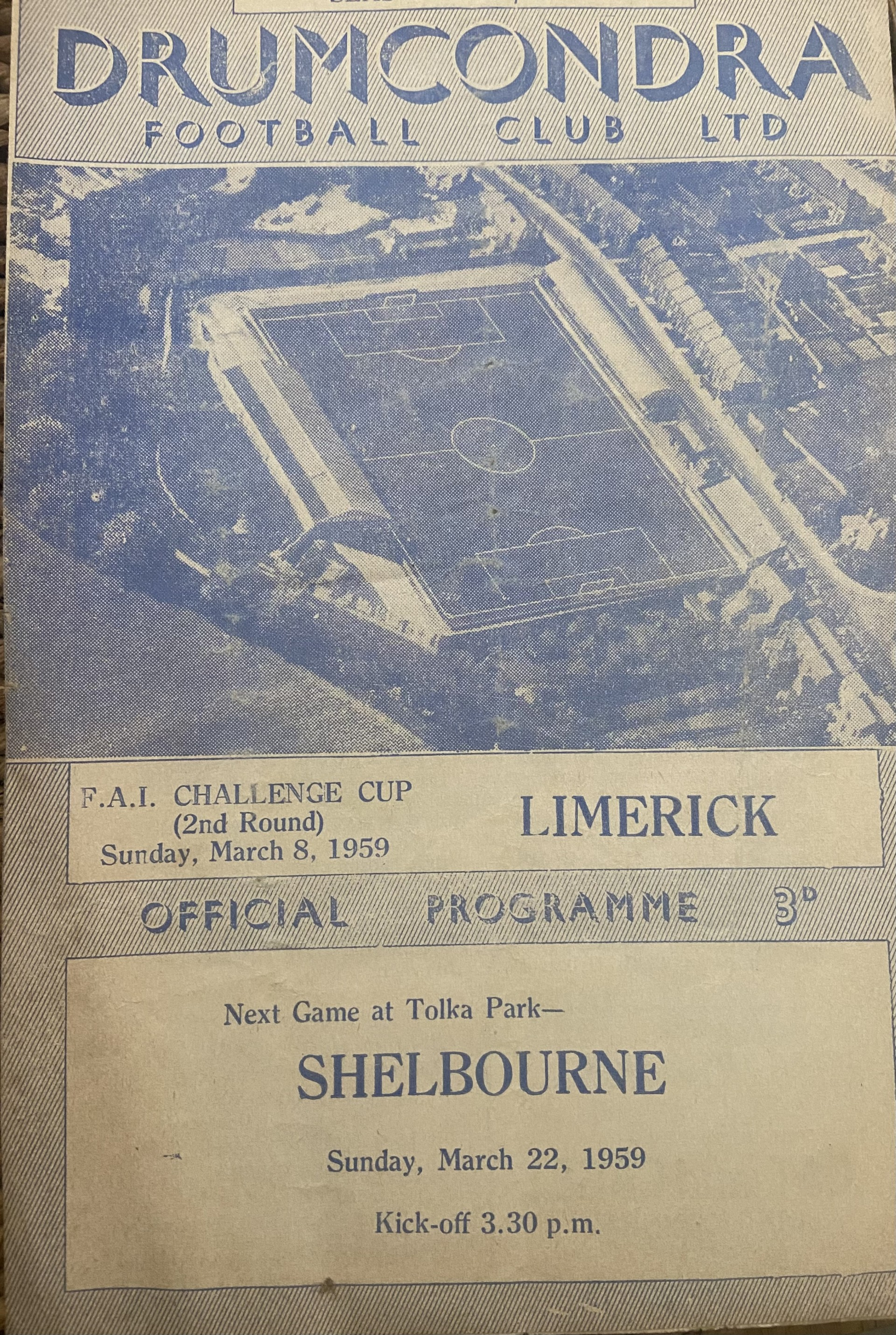
Drumcondra FC match programme with contemporary aerial view of Tolka Park from 1959

In the 1962–63 Inter-cities Fairs Cup, Tolka Park was the venue when Drumcondra beat Bayern Munich 1–0 with a goal from Billy Dixon. However Drums merged with local team Home Farm in 1972, and after the demise of Drumcondra, Home Farm moved into the ground. During Drums' time in Tolka they won both the League of Ireland and FAI Cup on five occasions.

However, Home Farm never drew large crowds and Tolka fell into disrepair (though it did host the replay of the 1984 FAI Cup final). After a shock FAI Cup final win over Shels, Home Farm played their only ever home European tie in Tolka Park against French side Lens in the 1975–76 European Cup Winners' Cup first round.

=== Shelbourne F.C. ===
In 1989, Shelbourne, who had played home games regularly in Tolka during the fifties, sixties, seventies, and early eighties, acquired Home Farm's long term lease from the Dublin Corporation on the ground. Home Farm moved to their own ground in nearby Whitehall Stadium. Shelbourne invested heavily in the stadium, converting it into Ireland's first all-seater stadium and building a new stand behind the Drumcondra end goal in 1999.

During the 1990s and early 2000s, Shels would regularly host top Premier League sides in high-profile friendly games. Manchester United, Liverpool, Leeds United, and Celtic were regular visitors, along with more rare guests such as Club Universidad Nacional of Mexico, FC Dnipro of Ukraine, and Brøndby.

The first League of Ireland match to be broadcast live on television was a fixture between Shelbourne and Derry City, staged at Tolka Park during the 1996–97 season.

On 7 April 1998, an FAI Cup semi-final replay against Finn Harps was delayed due to a bomb scare.

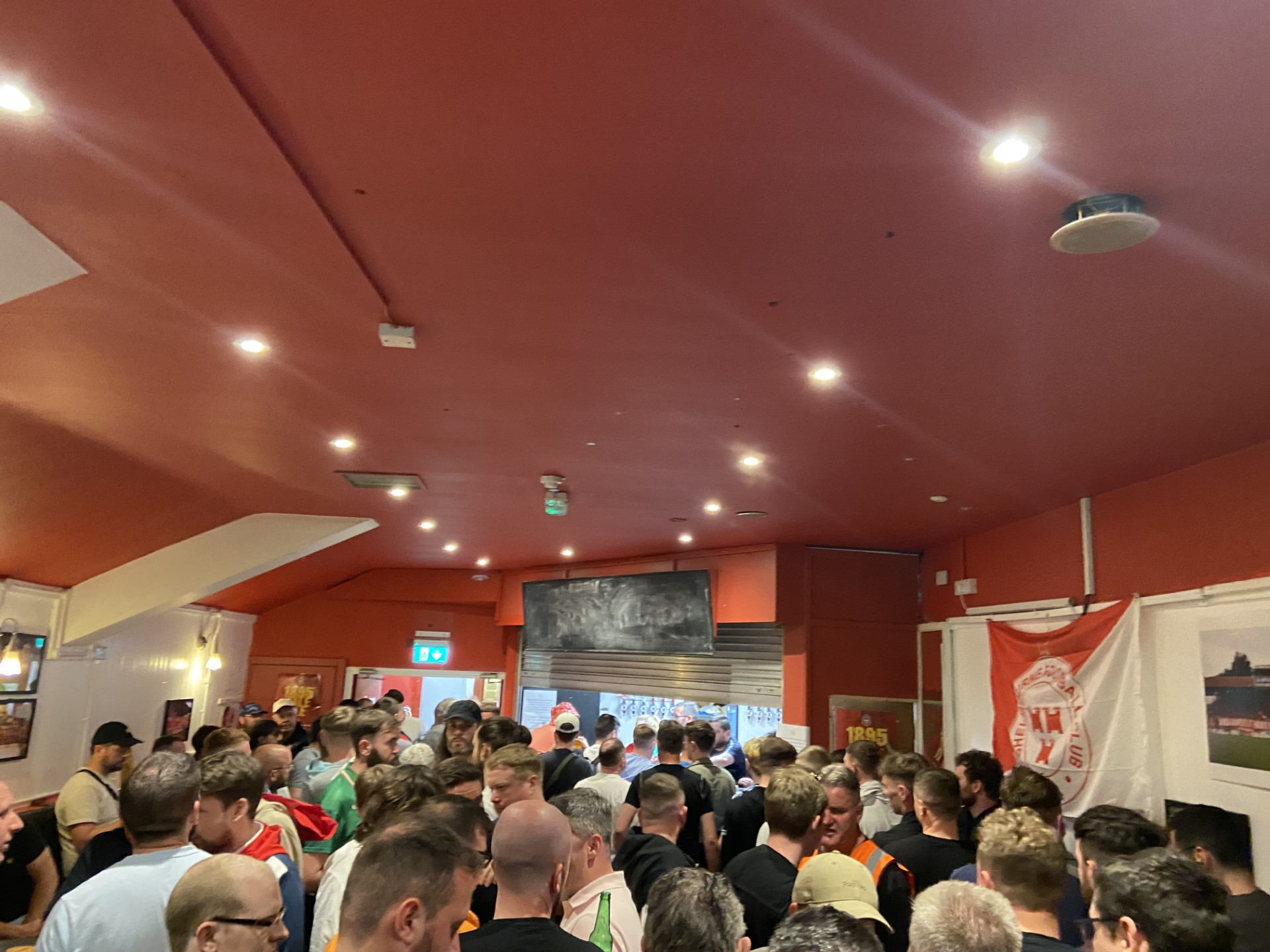
Home fans in the Tolka Bar prior to the Shelbourne v Sligo Rovers League of Ireland Premier Division game 9 June 2023

However, Shelbourne FC ran into several severe problems that had put the future of Tolka Park in doubt. One problem was a flood in 2002 that caused extensive damage to the pitch and greatly increased the club's insurance costs. Ronnie Drew's band The Celtic Tenors played a fundraising gig free of charge to help the club get Tolka Park back in operation. But a far more serious long-term problem was caused by the club's getting into severe debt through overspending on playing staff. In 2006, Ollie Byrne, Shelbourne Chief Executive sold the ground to property developer Ossie Kilkenny to help repay the club's debts. Legal action between the parties who bought the ground delayed its demolition and development, as had a slowdown in the Irish property market. By 2011, the club were reporting that the ground was in need of maintenance.

In June 2022, legendary Italian Dj Mauro Picotto played an exclusive set in the club bar after a Shelbourne home match.

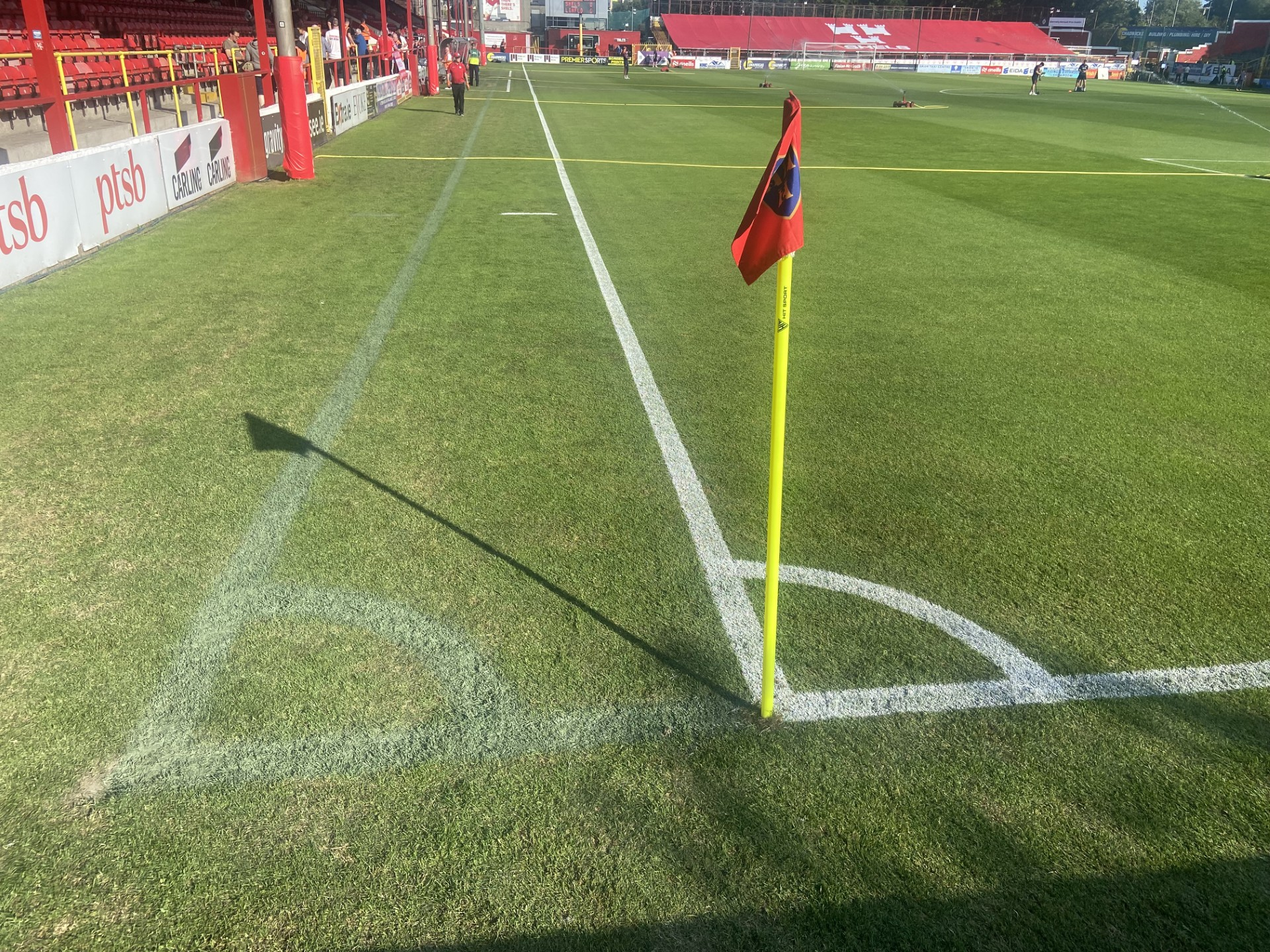
Narrowed pitch at Tolka Park for Champions League qualifier to comply with UEFA regulations 9 July 2025

Over 1,000 Shels fans watched their side win the 2024 League of Ireland Premier Division on three big screens on the final day of the season as the club was officially only allocated 300 tickets for the final match in Derry.

On the opening day of the 2025 League of Ireland Premier Division season, the Tolka Park floodlights failed at half-time against Derry City. The issue was eventually resolved with the second half starting approximately 50 minutes late. In November 2025, Shelbourne announced that they had agreed on a 250-year lease for Tolka Park with Dublin City Council.

In September 2025, Tolka Park staged a UEFA Youth League tie for the first time when Shelbourne defeated North Macedonia side Rabotnicki 5:0.

While Shelbourne's senior teams have been playing at Tolka Park, they have won 8 League of Ireland Men's Premier Division titles, 6 FAI Cups, 2 League of Ireland Women's Premier Divisions and 2 FAI Women's Cups. The 2026 season is the men's side sixty-second season and the women's side eighth season playing home league games in Tolka Park. The men's side have played 26 home UEFA club competition games in Tolka.

=== Shamrock Rovers F.C. ===
In 1987, the then owners of Shamrock Rovers, the Kilcoyne family, attempted to move the club to Tolka Park. Rovers played there for a season, but the games were boycotted by some of their fans, who were trying to save Glenmalure Park from demolition.

Rovers returned to the ground in 1996 which they rented for a time from Shelbourne on and off (1996–1999, 2001–2002, 2004–2005 and 2006–2008) while Tallaght Stadium was being developed. They eventually moved into the Tallaght Stadium in 2009. Rovers' home tie against Sligo Rovers during the 2009 season was moved to Tolka Park amid safety concerns due to construction on-site at Tallaght before the club friendly against Real Madrid. During their time in Tolka, the Hoops played three European ties at the venue, against Omonia Nicosia in the 1987–88 European Cup, against Altay in the 1998 UEFA Intertoto Cup, and against Djurgården in the 2002–03 UEFA Cup.

=== Other clubs ===
Down the years, several other League of Ireland clubs have used Tolka Park for domestic and European games. Dolphin used Tolka during their final two seasons (1935–36 and 1936–37) in the league for some games, St James's Gate during the mid-1990s, and Dublin City during their short existence in the early 2000s.

In the 1984–85 European Cup Winners' Cup, U.C.D. hosted eventual tournament winners Everton at Tolka and drew 0:0 in front of 10,000 fans. In 1990, Bray Wanderers played Trabzonspor in the European Cup Winners' Cup in Tolka. St Patrick's Athletic played two European ties in Tolka during the 1990s, against Dinamo București and Celtic. In 1999 Bohemians played home league games for two months in Tolka due to redevelopment work at Dalymount Park and in 2000, two UEFA Cup ties against Aberdeen and Kaiserslautern. Dundalk played their 2002–03 UEFA Cup tie against Varteks in Tolka.

In March 1993, Drogheda United hosted Aston Villa in a friendly match in Tolka Park.

=== Ireland Football ===
Tolka Park has staged two full internationals for the Republic of Ireland men in 1981 and 1993. Both matches were friendlies against Wales.

Ireland International Football Matches
Date	Home	Score	Opponent	Competition	Attendance
24 February 1981	Republic of Ireland	1–3	Wales	Friendly	15,000
17 February 1993	Republic of Ireland	2–1	Wales	Friendly	9,500

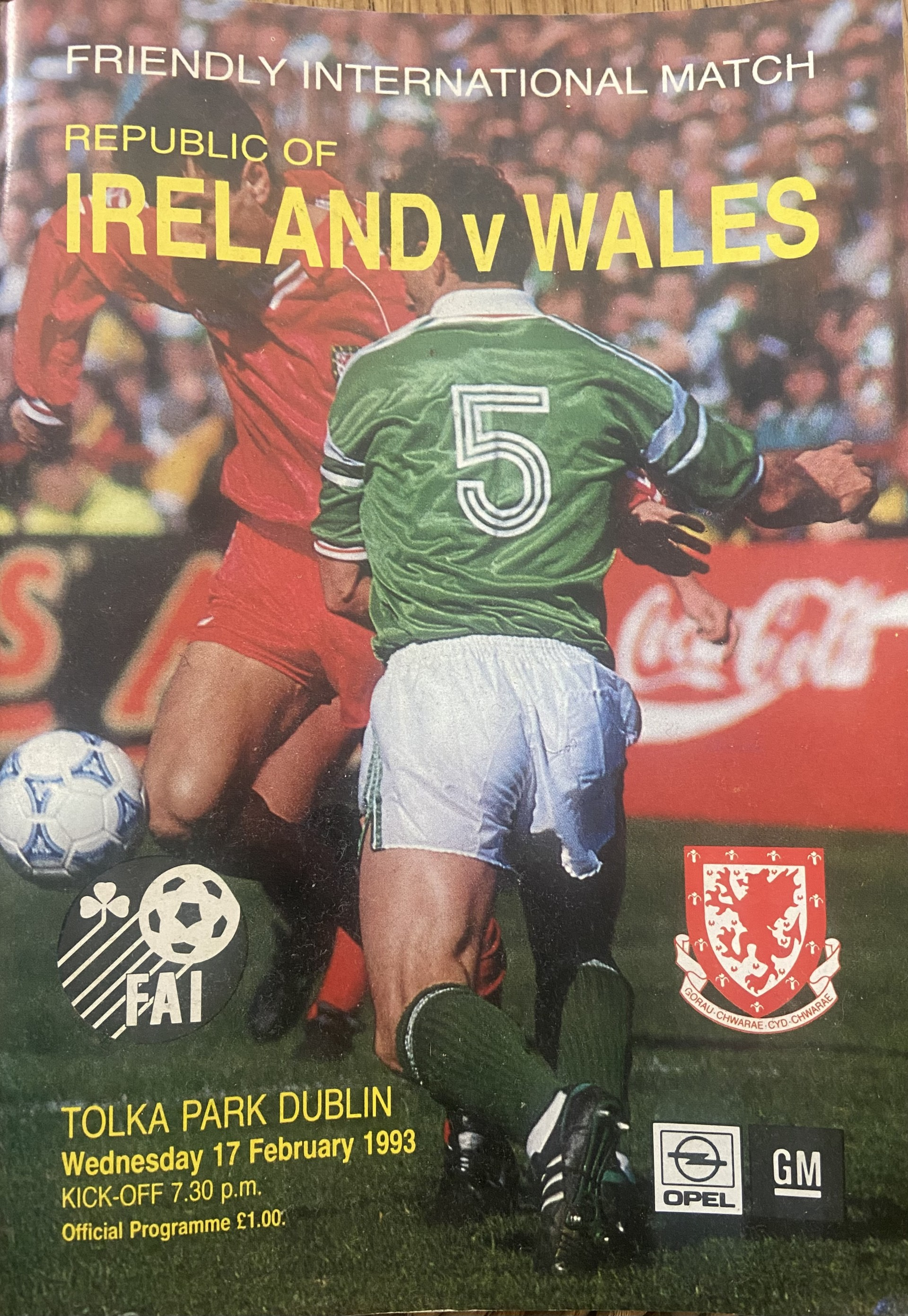
Match programme from Republic of Ireland v Wales full international in 1993

=== Women's football ===
Anne O'Brien scored a hat-trick at Tolka Park in 1971, as her Vards team beat St John Bosco 3–2 in the final of the Drumcondra Cup. Tolka Park hosted the 2010 FAI Women's Cup final, in which Áine O'Gorman scored a hat-trick to help Peamount United beat Salthill Devon 4–2. The Republic of Ireland women have sporadically played games at Tolka Park including a 0–0 friendly draw against France in September 1978 and a 1–0 1999 FIFA Women's World Cup qualification (UEFA) defeat by Poland in November 1997.

In March 2019 Shelbourne's women's team announced that they would play their home fixtures at Tolka Park, instead of the isolated AUL Complex. In October 2021 the TG4 Irish language television network broadcast the first ever Women's National League match. Alex Kavanagh scored the goal in Shelbourne's 1–0 win over DLR Waves at Tolka Park.

=== Rugby League ===
The Irish Rugby League Team have also played home games at the ground and hosted two games of the 2000 Rugby League World Cup.

International Rugby League Matches
Date	Home	Score	Opponent	Competition	Attendance
4 November 1998	Ireland	22–24	France	European Tri Nations Championship	1,511
31 October 1999	Ireland	31–10	Scotland	Triangular Series	385
1 November 2000	Ireland	18–6	Scotland	2000 Rugby League World Cup	1,782
4 November 2000	Ireland	30–16	(Māori people) Maori	2000 Rugby League World Cup	3,164
5 November 2006	Ireland	18–18	Lebanon	2008 RLWC qualifying	450

=== Other uses ===
The venue hosted the 1984 FAI Cup final replay and hosted the final from 1999 until the second final in 2002 then the fixture was shifted back to Lansdowne Road. Play in the second final in 2002 was temporarily halted following the outbreak of a fire. The stadium hosted the first Setanta Cup Final when Linfield defeated Shelbourne in 2005 and hosted the final in 2006. Tolka hosted two games in the 2011 UEFA Regions' Cup. The venue has also hosted numerous FAI Intermediate Cup and FAI Junior Cup finals as well as League of Ireland Cup finals.

Tolka Park has also hosted 15 games for the League of Ireland XI representative side, the first being against the Irish League representative team in 1960.

=== Other sports ===
In August 1938, September 1939 and April 1947 it held boxing championship bouts.

On 8 June 1951, Jack Doyle faced "Two Ton" Tony Galento in a professional wrestling match in front of 22,500 attendees.

In 1959, the world famous Harlem Globetrotters played two basketball matches in Tolka Park on a specially imported court.

== Current layout ==
=== Richmond Road ===
The Richmond Road Stand or "Main Stand" runs the length of the north side of the pitch. The stand is named after Richmond Road which is directly behind the stand. The technical area is located at the stand as well as the Directors' Box, Box office and First aid area. The club bar is situated underneath Section E, which is at the eastern end of the stand.

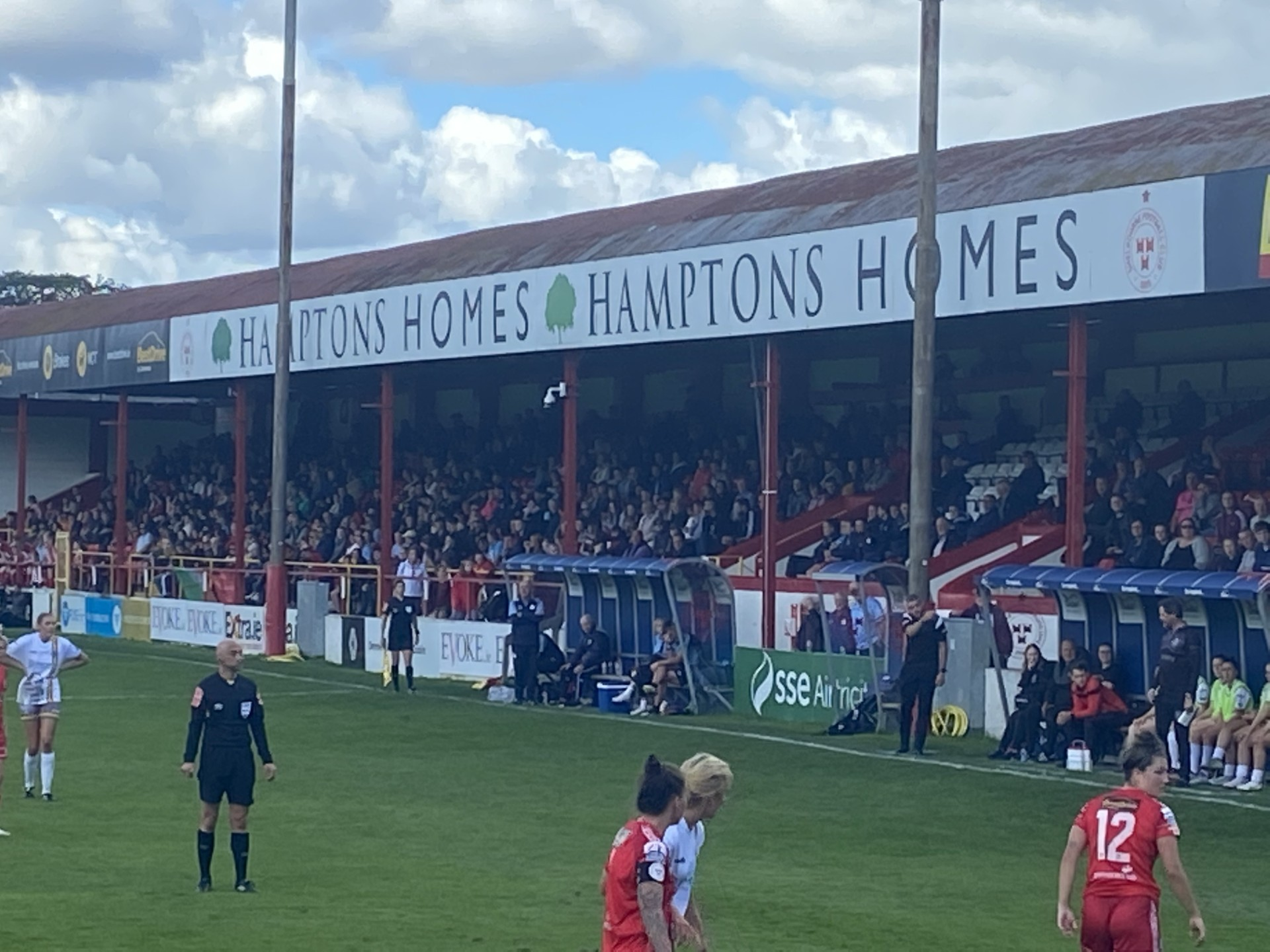
Main Stand during the Shelbourne v Bohemians FAI Women's Cup semi-final 24 September 2022

=== Riverside Stand ===
The Riverside Stand runs the length of the south side of the pitch. Today it is mainly used for Broadcasting and seating home fans. It is named after the River Tolka which runs behind the stand. The stand is mainly used by the club’s ultras and is the loudest and most vocal stand in the ground.

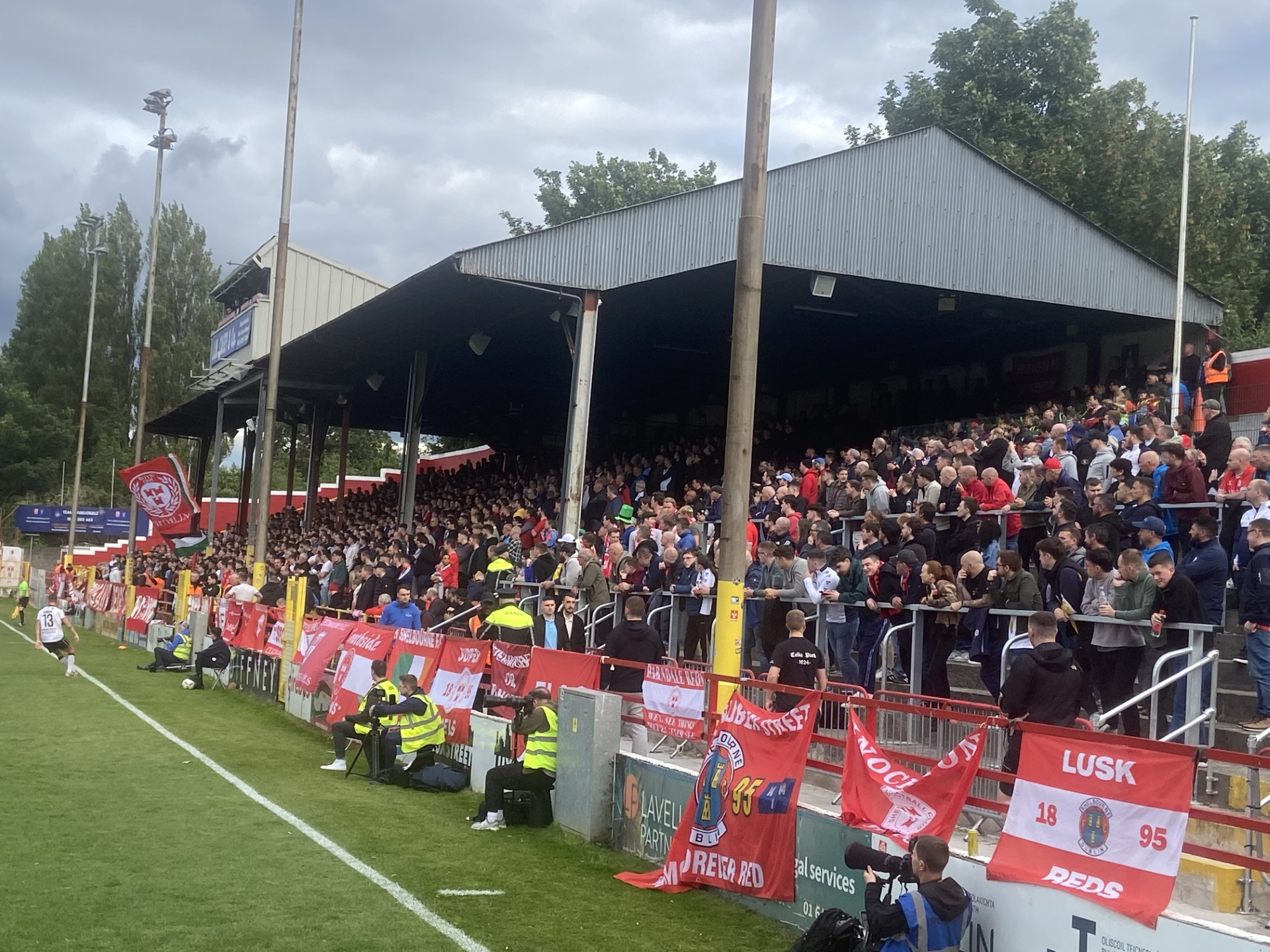
Shelbourne fans in the Riverside Stand for a League of Ireland Premier Division match versus Dundalk on 7 June 2024

In 2013, the seated capacity of the stand was 2,500. In 2024, the stand was renovated with the replacement of damaged seats and the addition of safe standing sections.

=== Drumcondra End ===
The Drumcondra End is home to the "New Stand" also known as the Drumcondra Stand. The stand is located behind the goal at the west end of the ground and is the most recently built stand, having opened in 2000. The stand is named after the town of Drumcondra which is located behind the stand. The ultras within the club's support base formerly congregated in the Drumcondra Stand until it was closed in 2019 due to major structural issues with the roof. The seats were removed in 2021 and used to renovate the Ballybough End.

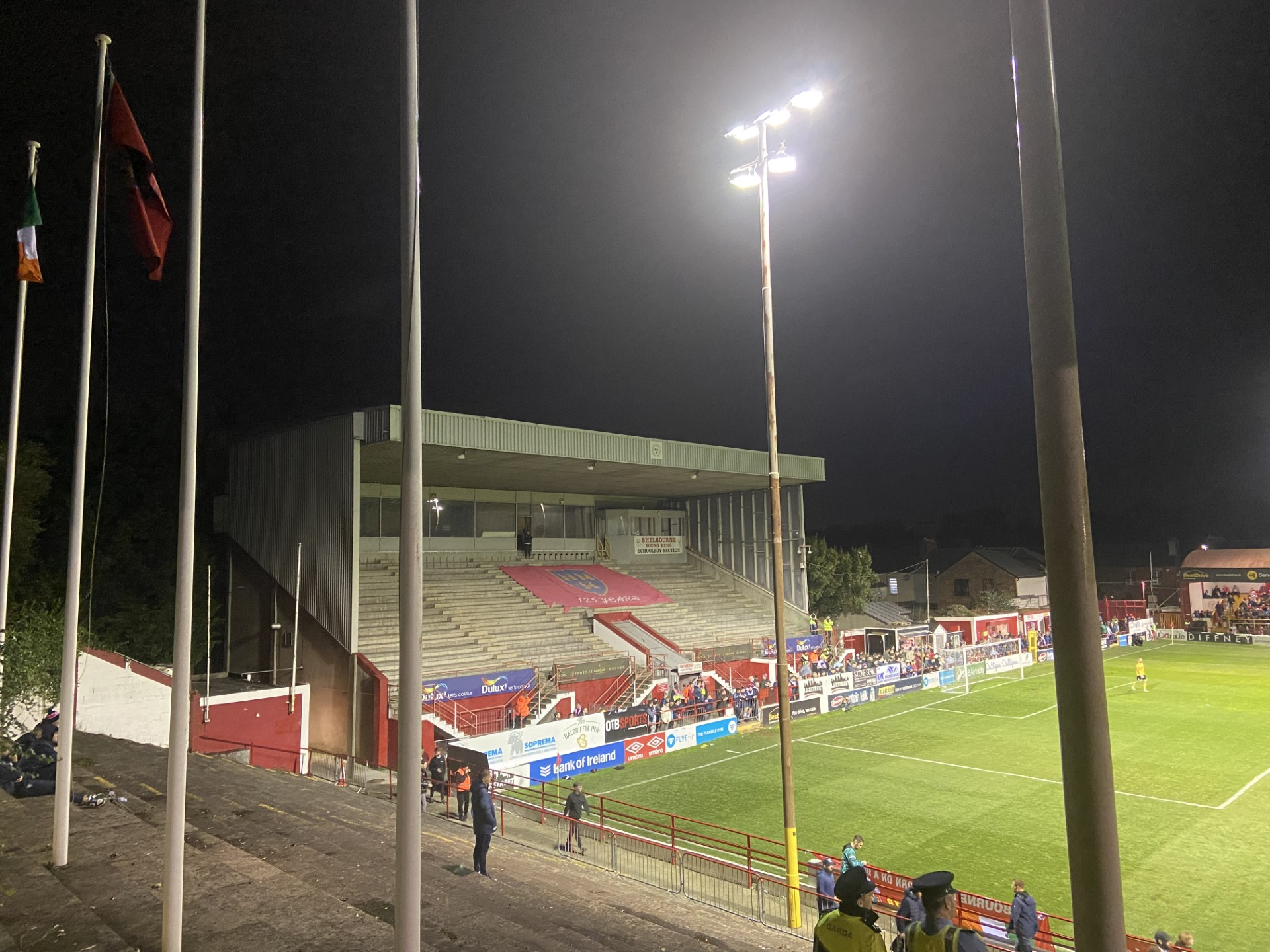
Drumcondra Stand with seats removed in October 2023

The Drumcondra Stand also houses the stadium's dressing rooms, which were renovated by a club sponsor in 2025. The club shop is located beside the stand. A new fanzone opened behind the stand in May 2025, the Rockshore Bar which is open pre-match and at half-time with a capacity for 150 fans.

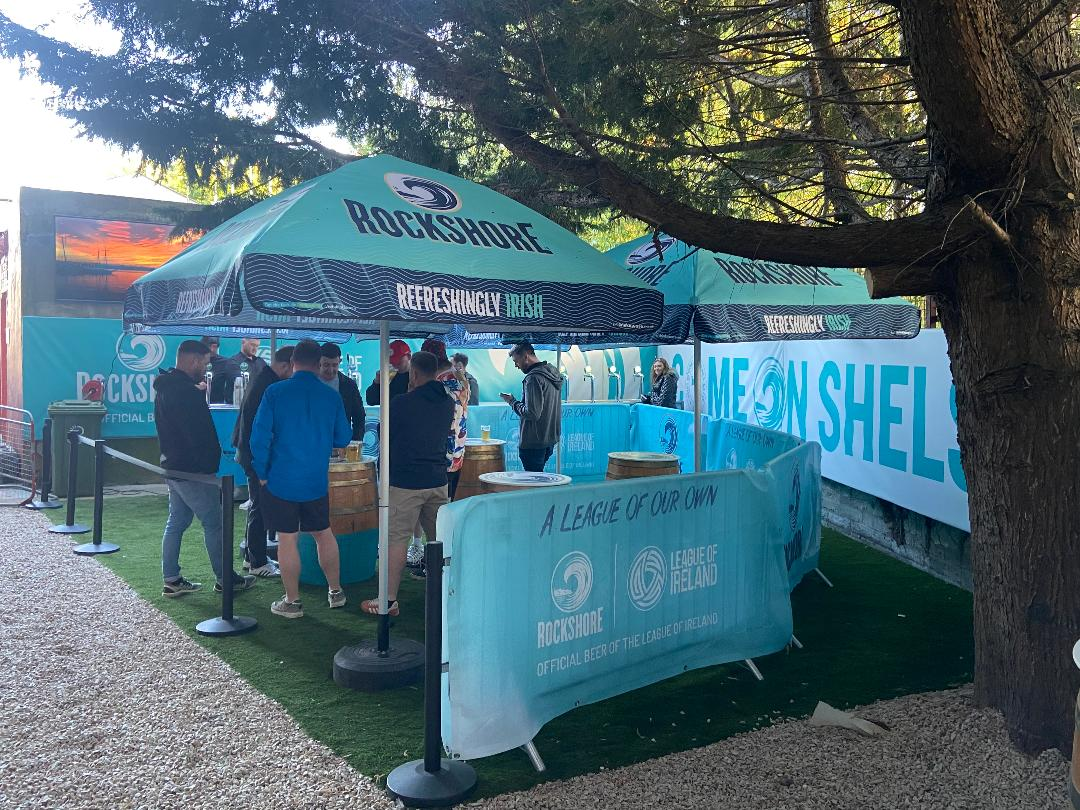
Tolka Park Fanzone behind Drumcondra Stand on 19 May 2025

After undergoing redevelopment work, the Drumcondra Stand reopened on 3 April 2026 with a seating capacity of 800.

=== Ballybough End ===
The Ballybough End is located behind the goal at the east end of the ground. It is named after the neighbourhood of Ballybough which is located behind the stand. Away fans enter the stadium through the Ballybough turnstiles. The Ballybough stand became neglected over the years due to the decreased attendance of Shelbourne. It was deemed unsafe and closed by the Dublin Fire Brigade Health and Safety Unit in 2010. The stand was reopened in time for the 2022 season to house away fans. The broken seats that formerly occupied the stand were removed and replaced with standing barriers, transforming the lower half of the stand into a terrace with a capacity of 800. This may be increased in the future pending other infrastructural improvements. In July 2023, the away allocation for visiting clubs in the Ballybough End increased by 250, for a total capacity of 1,050.

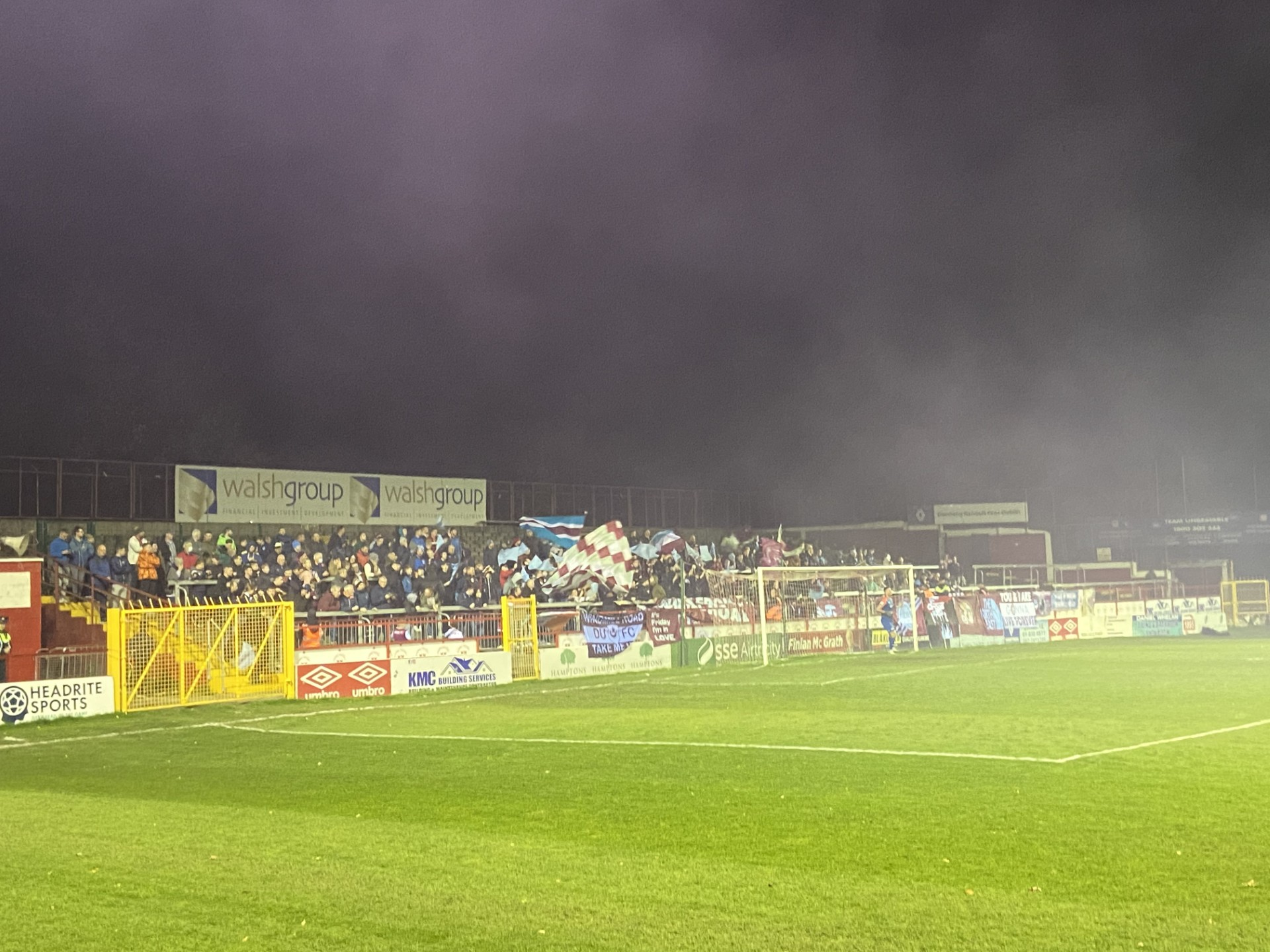
Away fans in the Ballybough End during a League of Ireland Premier Division game between Shelbourne and Drogheda United 28 October 2022

== References in popular culture ==
- Scenes for a Lucozade Sport ad in 1992 featuring then Republic of Ireland national football team star Niall Quinn were shot in Tolka Park.
- A chapter of Dermot Bolger's novel, A Second Life, takes place in Tolka Park, during a European competition match in which Shelbourne overturn a first-leg defeat over Ukrainian side, Karpaty Lvov, and the novel's narrator and his young son are ushered off the pitch by Ollie Byrne during a celebratory pitch invasion.
- Scenes from the 2000 movie Mad About Mambo were shot in Tolka Park.
- The ground has appeared in the Sky tv fictional football drama Dream Team when Harchester United were drawn to play Shelbourne in the UEFA Cup in 2001.
- The ground appeared in the football comedy movie Fran where Fran's club St Peter's United lost a cup final held at Tolka Park.
- The promotional music video for the 2021 song To Have You by For Those I Love was recorded in Tolka Park.

== Proposed developments ==
Following the sale of Tolka Park in 2006, Shelbourne had been trying to relocate to a new ground. Plans for a new stadium in Finglas and Swords came to nothing, as has an FAI-backed proposed ground-share with North Dublin neighbours Bohemians. Plans were underway in March and April 2015 for the Council to take back ownership of the land, and for Shelbourne to groundshare Bohemians in (newly Council-owned) Dalymount Park. On 4 October 2016 Shelbourne announced that they would leave Tolka Park for a newly refurbished Dalymount Park. In April 2021, the Dalymount redevelopment was expected to conclude by 2025.

A local campaign called 'Save Tolka Park' was set up with the aim to secure the future of the stadium and prevent the stadium from being demolished. In February 2022, the city council agreed to examine the feasibility of the sale of the stadium back to Shelbourne. The council granted the club a 250-year lease in November 2025.

On 28 May 2026, it was announced that Shelbourne and the Tolka Park Community Hub project would receive €9.2M in funding from the state's Immigrant Investor Programme.

== Transportation ==
Tolka Park is served by Irish Rail commuter services that stop at Drumcondra, on routes to and from Dublin Connolly serving M3 Parkway, Maynooth, and Hazelhatch/Celbridge. Most services to/from Longford and Sligo also serve Drumcondra. The stadium is also served by Clontarf Road DART station which is approximately a 2 km walk away.

Dublin Bus routes 1, 16, 19, 33, 41, 41b, 41c and 44 also stop near the stadium on the Drumcondra Road. Routes H1, H2, H3, 15, 27, 27X and 42 serve nearby Fairview, while the N2 stops on Griffith Avenue.

== See also ==
- List of rugby league stadiums by capacity

Preceded by None	Host of the Setanta Sports Cup Final; 2005; 2006	Succeeded by Windsor Park
