= Carving the Stone =

Studio album by For Those I Love
- Released: 8 August 2025
- Length: 45:18
- Label: September
- Producer: David Balfe

For Those I Love chronology
| For Those I Love (2021) | Carving the Stone (2025) |

Singles from Carving the Stone
- 1. "Of the Sorrows" Released: 20 May 2025; 2. "No Scheme" Released: 30 June 2025; 3. "Mirror" Released: 25 July 2025

Carving the Stone is the second studio album by the Irish musician For Those I Love. It was released on 8 August 2025, via September Recordings in LP, CD and digital formats.

== Background ==
The album succeeds Balfe's 2021 eponymous debut project, For Those I Love. The title originated from Balfe's regular use of the phrase "carving the stone".

The first single, "Of the Sorrows" was released on 20 May 2025. It was followed by "No Scheme", the second single of the album on 30 June 2025. "Mirror" was released as the third single on 25 July 2025.

== Reception ==
Professional ratings
Review scores
| Source | Rating |
|---|---|
| Clash | 8/10 |
| The Guardian | 4/5 stars |
| Hot Press | 9/10 |
| Narc | 4.5/5 stars |
| NME | 5/5 stars |

The album received a five-star rating from NME reviewer Alastair Shuttleworth, who remarked, "Throughout the Dublin poet-producer's new album Carving the Stone, he is trapped between those two states of mind: his love of home paralyses his impulse to leave, while the problems he observes – crime, skyrocketing rents, boredom – make a future there just as unthinkable." Ben Broyd of Clash rated the album eight out of ten and described it as "an honest, yet occasionally brutal, portrait of modern life in Dublin, it's raw, poetic, and politically charged. With the album being centered around the concept of time, Carving the Stone feels like it will stand the test of it."

The Guardian assigned the album a rating of four stars out of five. Writing for the publication, Rachel Aroesti noted, "Carving the Stone's portraits of new kinds of poverty are too depressing – and depressingly accurate – to be beautiful, although the music offers occasional bursts of strange joy, while Balfe's heartfelt, hyper-focused social commentary means it's rare to find an album this rich in meaning." It was given a nine-out-of-ten score by Hot Press reviewer Peter McGoran, who praised the production, stating it gives the album "a pulsating edge, ensuring its razor-sharp polemic stays focused and virulent."

Narc assigned the album a rating of 4.5 out of five, stating that "There are reflections on national identity, the passage of time and explosions of searing anger, yet this remarkable record's tone sees empowerment overcome despondency, fuelled by unyielding resistance and a burning thirst for justice." Rolling Stone UK described Carving the Stone as "a gorgeously rich and multi-faceted album" and stated, "While For Those I Love introduced him as a songwriter able to transmit deeply personal stories, the new album sees him equally adept at zooming out and connecting the personal and political as an incisive cultural commentator." BrooklynVegan referred to the album as "another stunner—maybe not a record you'll want on repeat—but one that rewards every time you do" and "a record that demands your full attention".

== Track listing ==
All tracks are written by David Balfe.

| No. | Title | Length |
|---|---|---|
| 1. | "Carving the Stone" | 3:51 |
| 2. | "No Quiet" | 3:51 |
| 3. | "No Scheme" | 3:47 |
| 4. | "The Ox / The Afters" | 5:13 |
| 5. | "Civic" | 5:37 |
| 6. | "Mirror" | 4:00 |
| 7. | "This Is Not the Place I Belong" | 5:50 |
| 8. | "Of the Sorrows" | 5:33 |
| 9. | "I Came Back to See the Stone Had Moved" | 7:36 |
| Total length: | | 45:18 |

== Personnel ==
Credits adapted from Tidal.

- David Balfe – vocals, instrumentation, production, engineering
- Ben Baptie – mixing
- Matt Colton – mastering
- Peter Ashmore – additional engineering

== Charts ==
Chart performance for For Those I Love
| Chart (2025) | Peak position |
|---|---|
| Irish Albums (OCC) | 11 |
| Irish Independent Albums (IRMA) | 2 |
| Scottish Albums (OCC) | 84 |
| UK Albums Sales (OCC) | 52 |
| UK Dance Albums (OCC) | 6 |
| UK Independent Albums (OCC) | 18 |
