= For Those I Love =

Irish musician, producer and visual artist

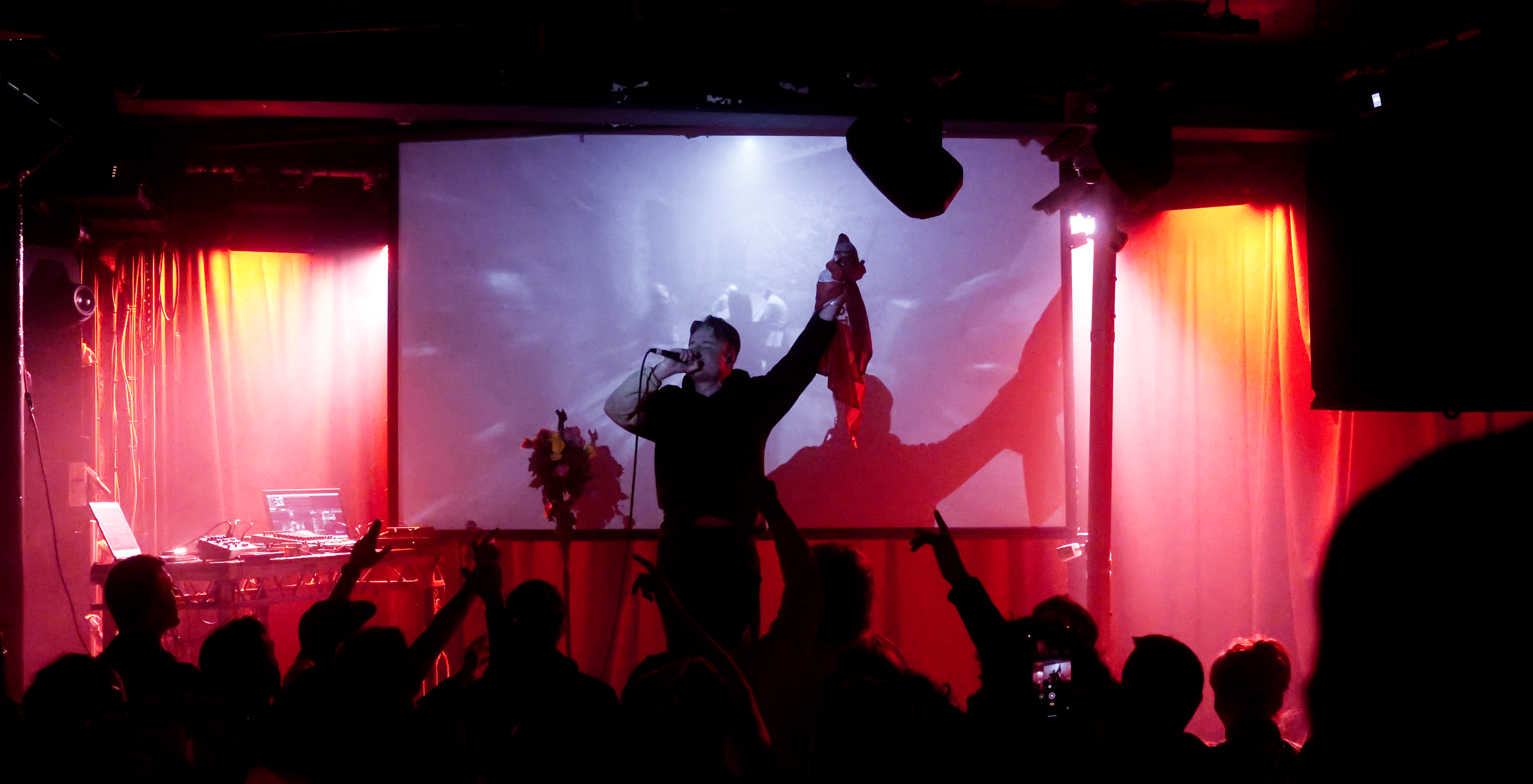
- For Those I Love performs at Limelight 2 in Belfast

Background information
- Born: David Andrew Balfe
- Origin: Dublin, Ireland
- Genres: Electronic
- Occupations: Musician; record producer
- Years active: 2019–present
- Label: September Recordings
- Website: forthosei.love

For Those I Love is the musical project of David Andrew Balfe from Dublin, whose 2021 debut album For Those I Love was met with critical acclaim.

== Career ==
Balfe is a former band member of the Blind and Mothers & Fathers with Pamela Connolly of Pillow Queens.

In 2019, his debut self-titled record was released independently on Bandcamp. However, it was later pulled from the platform to make room for its 2021 reissue on September Recordings. The album was themed around the suicide of his late friend, spoken word musician Paul Curran, and won the 2021 Choice Music Prize.

In December 2020, For Those I Love performed the project's first extended live performance as part of the Irish music festival and the TV show Other Voices.

Balfe's second album, Carving The Stone, was released in 2025 on September Recordings. The album focussed on life in Dublin following the end of the Celtic Tiger period and during the Great Recession.

== Personal life ==
Balfe lives in Dublin. He spent a period of time in County Leitrim to look for inspiration for his second album, however did not find this helpful and returned to Dublin.

== Discography ==
=== Studio albums ===
- For Those I Love (2019)
- Carving the Stone (2025)

=== Extended plays ===
- Into a World That Doesn't Understand it, Unless You're from It (2020)
