= Case Oats =

American alternative country band

Case Oats is an American alternative country band based in Chicago, Illinois. The band consists of vocalist Casey Walker, guitarist Max Subar, bassist Jason Ashworth, fiddle player Scott Daniel, and drummer Spencer Tweedy.

== History ==
The group began in Chicago, performing live all around the city. In March 2025, the group signed to North Carolina based record label Merge Records. The group also performed at the South by Southwest festival, and received praise for their performances. The group announced their debut album Last Missouri Exit in May 2025, which was released on August 22 through Merge Records. In addition to the album announcement, the group released the single "Bitter Root Lake".

== Discography ==
Studio albums

- Last Missouri Exit (2025, Merge Records)
