= Max Subar =

American musician

Max Subar is an American musician based in Chicago, Illinois. Subar is currently signed to the record label Merge Records. Subar is also a member of the band Case Oats.

== History ==
Subar grew up in Chicago's northwest suburbs and began performing at local house shows and open mics, including at Uncommon Ground and the Elbo Room, before self-releasing his debut EP. Subar released his debut EP in 2018 titled In a Dream. Subar released his self-titled second EP in 2020.

Subar began writing much of the material for Anything Could Be during 2020 and started recording it at a lake house near Milwaukee, drawing on a network of Chicago-area musicians including Case Oats drummer Spencer Tweedy, Chet Zenor, Jason Ashworth, Sarah Weddle, and his brother Sam Subar. In 2026, Subar will release his debut album titled Anything Could Be.

== Discography ==
Studio albums

- Anything Could Be (2026, Merge Records)

EPs

- In a Dream (2018, self-released)
