= List of 2018 albums =

The following is a list of albums, EPs, and mixtapes released in 2018. These albums are (1) original, i.e. excluding reissues, remasters, and compilations of previously released recordings, and (2) notable, defined as having received significant coverage from reliable sources independent of the subject.

For additional information about bands formed, reformed, disbanded, or on hiatus, for deaths of musicians, and for links to musical awards, see 2018 in music.

== First quarter ==
=== January ===
List of albums released in January 2018
Go to: January | February | March | April | May | June | July | August | September | October | November | December | Back to top
Release date	Artist	Album	Genre	Label	Ref.
January 1	Jeff Rosenstock	Post-	Punk rock, indie rock, power pop	Quote Unquote Records, Polyvinyl	
January 5	Cupcakke	Ephorize	Hip-hop		
January 5	Watain	Trident Wolf Eclipse	Black metal	Century Media	
January 12	The Academic	Tales from the Backseat	Indie rock, indie pop	Room 6 Records, Downtown	
January 12	Anderson East	Encore	Southern soul	Elektra	
January 12	Avatar	Avatar Country	Groove metal, melodic death metal, heavy metal	eOne, Century Media	
January 12	Black Rebel Motorcycle Club	Wrong Creatures	Alternative rock	Abstract Dragon, Vagrant, PIAS Cooperative	
January 12	Black Veil Brides	Vale	Glam metal, hard rock, nu metal	Lava, Republic	
January 12	Børns	Blue Madonna	Pop	Interscope	
January 12	Camila Cabello	Camila	Pop	Epic, Syco Music, Sony Music	
January 12	Corrosion of Conformity	No Cross No Crown	Stoner rock, sludge metal, Southern metal	Nuclear Blast	
January 12	Francesca Michielin	2640	Pop, indie pop	Sony Music Italy	
January 12	Joe Satriani	What Happens Next	Instrumental rock	Sony Music	
January 12	Maxo Kream	Punken	Hip-hop	TSO Music Group, Kream Clicc	
January 12	Meghan Patrick	Country Music Made Me Do It	Country	Warner Music Canada	
January 12	Panda Bear	A Day with the Homies		Domino	
January 12	Shame	Songs of Praise	Post-punk, indie rock	Dead Oceans	
January 12	Sylvan LaCue	Apologies in Advance		WiseUp & Co	
January 12	Tonight Alive	Underworld	Alternative rock, pop rock, pop-punk	Hopeless, UNFD	
January 12	Typhoon	Offerings	Indie rock	Roll Call	
January 19	Anvil	Pounding the Pavement	Heavy metal	Steamhammer	
January 19	The Bad Plus	Never Stop II	Jazz	Legbreaker Records	
January 19	Black Label Society	Grimmest Hits	Heavy metal, hard rock	Entertainment One	
January 19	Caitlyn Smith	Starfire	Country pop	Monument	
January 19	Cane Hill	Too Far Gone	Nu metal, grunge, groove metal	Rise	
January 19	Drake	Scary Hours		Young Money, Cash Money, Republic	
January 19	Eden	Vertigo	Alternative rock, indie pop, Electronic	MCMXCV, Astralwerks	
January 19	Fall Out Boy	Mania	Pop rock, electronic rock, electropop	Island, DCD2	
January 19	First Aid Kit	Ruins	Folk, indie folk	Columbia	
January 19	Glen Hansard	Between Two Shores		Anti-	
January 19	The Go! Team	Semicircle	Indie pop	Memphis Industries	
January 19	Joe Perry	Sweetzerland Manifesto	Hard rock, blues rock	Roman Records	
January 19	John Surman	Invisible Threads	Jazz	ECM	
January 19	JPEGMafia	Veteran	Experimental hip-hop, industrial hip-hop, avant-garde	Deathbomb Arc	
January 19	Magnum	Lost on the Road to Eternity	Rock	Steamhammer Records/SPV	
January 19	Moon Taxi	Let the Record Play	Alternative rock	RCA	
January 19	Mudhoney	LiE		Sub Pop	
January 19	Of Mice & Men	Defy	Metalcore, nu metal	Rise	
January 19	Porches	The House	Synth-pop	Domino	
January 19	Ron Gallo	Really Nice Guys	Indie rock, comedy rock	New West	
January 19	Shopping	The Official Body	Post-punk	FatCat	
January 19	Starcrawler	Starcrawler	Garage rock, punk rock	Rough Trade	
January 19	They Might Be Giants	I Like Fun	Alternative rock	Idlewild	
January 19	Tune-Yards	I Can Feel You Creep Into My Private Life	Indie pop, alternative dance, art pop	4AD	
January 19	The Xcerts	Hold On to Your Heart		Raygun Music	
January 19	Xylouris White	Mother	Indie folk	Bella Union, Universal Music Australia	
January 23	Jonghyun	Poet | Artist	R&B, soul, electronic	SM	
January 24	iLoveMakonnen and Ronny J	iLoveMakonnen x Ronny J			
January 26	Beth Hart and Joe Bonamassa	Black Coffee	Soul, blues	J&R Adventures	
January 26	Burna Boy	Outside	Afrobeats, dancehall, reggae	Spaceship Entertainment, Bad Habit, Atlantic	
January 26	Calexico	The Thread That Keeps Us		Anti-	
January 26	Craig David	The Time Is Now	R&B, tropical house	Speakerbox, Insanity, Sony Music	
January 26	The Dangerous Summer	The Dangerous Summer		Hopeless	
January 26	Dream Wife	Dream Wife	Punk rock, indie rock, indie pop	Lucky Number	
January 26	Elliot Galvin	The Influencing Machine		Edition	
January 26	Evidence	Weather or Not	Alternative hip-hop	Rhymesayers	
January 26	Hollie Cook	Vessel of Love	Reggae	Merge	
January 26	Khruangbin	Con Todo el Mundo	Psychedelic rock	Dead Oceans, Night Time Stories	
January 26	Loudness	Rise to Glory	Heavy metal	Ward Records, earMUSIC	
January 26	Machine Head	Catharsis	Groove metal, nu metal, alternative metal	Nuclear Blast	
January 26	Marmozets	Knowing What You Know Now	Alternative rock, post-hardcore, math rock	Roadrunner	
January 26	Migos	Culture II	Hip-hop, trap	Quality Control, Motown, Capitol	
January 26	Nils Frahm	All Melody		Erased Tapes	
January 26	No Age	Snares Like a Haircut	Noise rock, noise pop, art punk	Drag City	
January 26	Orphaned Land	Unsung Prophets & Dead Messiahs	Oriental metal, progressive metal, symphonic metal	Century Media	
January 26	Payroll Giovanni and Cardo	Big Bossin, Vol. 2		Def Jam	
January 26	Pestilence	Hadeon	Technical death metal	Hammerheart	
January 26	Portal	Ion		Profound Lore	
January 26	The Spook School	Could It Be Different?		Fortuna Pop!	
January 26	Therion	Beloved Antichrist	Symphonic metal	Nuclear Blast	
January 26	Tiny Moving Parts	Swell		Triple Crown, Big Scary Monsters	
January 26	Tribulation	Down Below	Gothic metal, heavy metal, black 'n' roll	Century Media	
January 26	Ty Segall	Freedom's Goblin		Drag City	
January 26	Waterparks	Entertainment	Pop-punk, rock, pop rock	Equal Vision	

=== February ===
List of albums released in February 2018
Go to: January | February | March | April | May | June | July | August | September | October | November | December | Back to top
Release date	Artist	Album	Genre	Label	Ref.
February 2	47Soul	Balfron Promise		Cooking Vinyl	
February 2	Awolnation	Here Come the Runts	Alternative rock, pop rock, indie rock	Red Bull	
February 2	Bat Fangs	Bat Fangs		Don Giovanni	
February 2	Don Broco	Technology	Hard rock, electronic rock	SharpTone	
February 2	Efrim Menuck	Pissing Stars		Constellation	
February 2	Field Music	Open Here	Indie rock	Memphis Industries	
February 2	Hookworms	Microshift	Rock	Domino	
February 2	Kyle Craft	Full Circle Nightmare	Indie rock	Sub Pop	
February 2	Justin Timberlake	Man of the Woods	Pop, R&B	RCA	
February 2	Mélissa Laveaux	Radyo Siwèl		No Format!	
February 2	Mike and the Moonpies	Steak Night at the Prairie Rose			
February 2	Rae Morris	Someone Out There	Art pop, electronic	Atlantic	
February 2	Rhye	Blood	R&B	Loma Vista	
February 2	Rich Brian	Amen	Hip-hop	Empire, 88rising	
February 2	Saxon	Thunderbolt	Heavy metal	Silver Lining Music	
February 2	Shannon Noll	Unbroken	Pop rock	Warner Music Australia	
February 2	The Soft Moon	Criminal	Industrial	Sacred Bones	
February 9	Alela Diane	Cusp		AllPoints	
February 9	The Atlas Moth	Coma Noir		Prosthetic	
February 9	Brigid Mae Power	The Two Worlds	Folk	Tompkins Square	
February 9	Dashboard Confessional	Crooked Shadows	Pop, alternative rock	Fueled by Ramen	
February 9	Don Diablo	Future	Future house	Hexagon	
February 9	Ezra Furman	Transangelic Exodus	Alternative pop	Bella Union	
February 9	Franz Ferdinand	Always Ascending	Indie rock, dance-punk, new wave	Domino	
February 9	Fu Manchu	Clone of the Universe	Stoner rock	At the Dojo Records	
February 9	Joan as Police Woman	Damned Devotion		PIAS	
February 9	Kendrick Lamar and various artists	Black Panther: The Album	Hip-hop, gqom, trap	TDE, Aftermath, Interscope	
February 9	Melody Gardot	Live in Europe	Jazz	Decca	
February 9	MGMT	Little Dark Age	Synth-pop, psychedelic pop	Columbia	
February 9	Mist	Diamond in the Dirt	Synth-pop, psychedelic pop	Warner Bros.	
February 9	Natalia Lafourcade and Los Macorinos	Musas, Vol. 2	Folk	Sony Music Mexico, RCA	
February 9	Palm	Rock Island	Avant rock, art rock, indie rock	Carpark	
February 9	Ravyn Lenae	Crush	R&B, neo soul	Atlantic, Three Twenty Three	
February 9	Son Lux	Brighter Wounds	Experimental, avant-garde	City Slang	
February 9	Wade Bowen	Solid Ground			
February 9	The Wombats	Beautiful People Will Ruin Your Life	Indie pop, indie rock, synth-pop	14th Floor, Bright Antenna	
February 14	Band-Maid	World Domination	Hard rock, heavy metal	Crown Stones, JPU	
February 14	Kodak Black	Heart Break Kodak	R&B	Atlantic	
February 14	Moneybagg Yo	2 Heartless	Hip-hop	CMG, Bread Gang Entertainment, Interscope	
February 14	Riri	Riri	R&B, EDM	Sony Music Associated Records	
February 15	Lonzo Ball	Born 2 Ball			
February 16	Alva Noto and Ryuichi Sakamoto	Glass	Ambient	NOTON	
February 16	Brandi Carlile	By the Way, I Forgive You	Americana	Low Country Sound, Elektra	
February 16	Car Seat Headrest	Twin Fantasy (Face to Face)	Indie rock	Matador	
February 16	Dabrye	Three/Three		Ghostly International	
February 16	Dita Von Teese	Dita Von Teese	Synth-pop	Record Makers	
February 16	Evan Parker, Barry Guy, and Paul Lytton	Music for David Mossman: Live at Vortex London	Free improvisation	Intakt	
February 16	Everything is Recorded	Everything Is Recorded by Richard Russell		XL	
February 16	Felix Jaehn	I	Dance, tropical house, EDM	L'Agentur	
February 16	Fischerspooner	Sir		Ultra	
February 16	For the Fallen Dreams	Six	Metalcore	Rise	
February 16	Geowulf	Great Big Blue		37 Adventures	
February 16	I'm with Her	See You Around	Progressive bluegrass	Rounder	
February 16	ionnalee	Everyone Afraid to Be Forgotten	Synth-pop, dance-pop, electropop	To whom it may concern.	
February 16	Kronos Quartet and Laurie Anderson	Landfall		Nonesuch, WEA	
February 16	Loma	Loma		Sub Pop	
February 16	Marlon Williams	Make Way for Love		Caroline Australia	
February 16	Nipsey Hussle	Victory Lap	West Coast hip-hop	All Money In, Atlantic	
February 16	Onra	Nobody Has to Know		All City Records	
February 16	Onyx	Black Rock	East Coast hip-hop, hardcore hip-hop, rap rock	X-Ray	
February 16	The Orielles	Silver Dollar Moment	Indie pop, indie rock	Heavenly	
February 16	Ought	Room Inside the World	Post-punk, art punk, punk rock	Merge	
February 16	Pianos Become the Teeth	Wait for Love	Post-hardcore, post-rock, emo	Epitaph	
February 16	The Plot in You	Dispose	Post-hardcore, pop rock	Fearless	
February 16	Poliça and Stargaze	Music for the Long Emergency		Transgressive	
February 16	Pop Evil	Pop Evil	Rock	eOne	
February 16	Rejjie Snow	Dear Annie		300	
February 16	Senses Fail	If There Is Light, It Will Find You	Screamo, pop-punk	Pure Noise	
February 16	Shannon and the Clams	Onion		Easy Eye Sound	
February 16	Superchunk	What a Time to Be Alive	Indie rock, punk rock	Merge	
February 16	Tyga	Kyoto	R&B	Last Kings, Empire	
February 16	U.S. Girls	In a Poem Unlimited	Psychedelic pop, art pop, synth-pop	4AD	
February 17	Against All Logic	2012–2017	Electronic, deep house, house	Other People	
February 20	Kero Kero Bonito	TOTEP			
February 23	6ix9ine	Day69	Trap	ScumGang, TenThousand Projects, Interscope	
February 23	Bad Gyal	Worldwide Angel	Dancehall, reggaeton, trap	Puro Records, Canada	
February 23	Black Milk	Fever	Hip-hop	Mass Appeal	
February 23	Caroline Rose	Loner	Indie rock, indie pop	New West	
February 23	Carpenter Brut	Leather Teeth		No Quarter Prod, Caroline	
February 23	Danielle Nicole	Cry No More		Concord	
February 23	Dessa	Chime	Alternative hip-hop, avant-pop	Doomtree	
February 23	EarthGang	Royalty	Conscious hip-hop, southern hip-hop, jazz rap	Spillage Village, Empire	
February 23	Grant-Lee Phillips	Widdershins	Americana, indie rock	Yep Roc	
February 23	Hailu Mergia	Lala Belu	Jazz, funk	Awesome Tapes From Africa	
February 23	Imarhan	Temet	Desert blues, world	City Slang	
February 23	Keiji Haino and Sumac	American Dollar Bill – Keep Facing Sideways, You're Too Hideous to Look at Face On	Free improvisation, post-metal	Thrill Jockey	
February 23	Milestones	Red Lights	Pop-punk, pop rock, pop	Fearless	
February 23	Our Lady Peace	Somethingness	Alternative rock, art rock		
February 23	Ryan Porter	The Optimist		World Galaxy Records	
February 23	Ronny J	OMGRONNY			
February 23	Screaming Females	All at Once	Rock, punk rock	Don Giovanni	
February 23	Shawn Colvin	The Starlighter	Children's music, folk	SLC Recordings	
February 23	SOB X RBE	Gangin		Empire	
February 23	Turnstile	Time & Space	Hardcore punk	Roadrunner	
February 23	Vance Joy	Nation of Two	Indie folk, indie pop	Liberation Music	
February 24	Mick Jenkins	Or More; the Frustration			
February 27	Roc Marciano	RR2: The Bitter Dose	Hip-hop, gangsta rap	Marci Enterprises	

=== March ===
List of albums released in March 2018
Go to: January | February | March | April | May | June | July | August | September | October | November | December | Back to top
Release date	Artist	Album	Genre	Label	Ref.
March 1	Peter Zummo	Frame Loop			
March 1	Ruby Fields	Your Dad's Opinion for Dinner		Ruby Fields	
March 2	Alma	Heavy Rules Mixtape		PME	
March 2	Andrew W.K.	You're Not Alone	Hard rock	RED, Sony Music	
March 2	Anna von Hausswolff	Dead Magic		City Slang	
March 2	Black Moth	Anatomical Venus		Candlelight	
March 2	The Breeders	All Nerve	Alternative rock	4AD	
March 2	Buffalo Tom	Quiet and Peace	Alternative rock, indie rock	Banquet	
March 2	Camp Cope	How to Socialise & Make Friends		Poison City	
March 2	Damien Done	Charm Offensive	Gothic rock, post-punk	Mind Over Matter	
March 2	Embrace	Love Is a Basic Need	Alternative rock	Cooking Vinyl	
March 2	Gwenno	Le Kov	Electropop, psychedelic pop	Heavenly	
March 2	Joan Baez	Whistle Down the Wind	Folk	Proper	
March 2	Jonathan Wilson	Rare Birds		Bella Union	
March 2	Keith Jarrett	After the Fall	Jazz	ECM	
March 2	Lucy Dacus	Historian	Indie rock, alternative country, rock and roll	Matador	
March 2	The Men	Drift		Sacred Bones	
March 2	Moby	Everything Was Beautiful, and Nothing Hurt	Electronica, trip hop	Little Idiot, Mute	
March 2	Phonte	No News Is Good News			
March 2	Rolo Tomassi	Time Will Die and Love Will Bury It	Mathcore, post-rock, experimental rock	Holy Roar	
March 2	Soccer Mommy	Clean	Indie rock, lo-fi, indie pop	Fat Possum	
March 2	Superorganism	Superorganism	Art pop, indie pop, psychedelic pop	Domino	
March 2	Suuns	Felt		Secretly Canadian	
March 2	Titus Andronicus	A Productive Cough	Punk rock, indie rock, heartland rock	Merge	
March 2	Tory Lanez	Memories Don't Die	Hip-hop, R&B, dancehall	Mad Love Records, Interscope	
March 2	Tracey Thorn	Record	Synth-pop	Merge	
March 2	Valee	GOOD Job, You Found Me		GOOD Music	
March 5	Pouya	Five Five		Buffet Boys	
March 9	03 Greedo	The Wolf of Grape Street		Alamo	
March 9	Albert Hammond Jr.	Francis Trouble	Indie rock, garage rock, post-punk revival	Red Bull	
March 9	August Greene	August Greene	Alternative hip-hop, jazz rap		
March 9	Between the Buried and Me	Automata I	Progressive metal, technical death metal	Sumerian	
March 9	Brad Mehldau	After Bach	Classical	Nonesuch	
March 9	Calum Scott	Only Human	Pop	Capitol	
March 9	Datarock	Face the Brutality		Young Aspiring Professionals	
March 9	David Byrne	American Utopia	Art pop, art rock	Todo Mundo, Nonesuch	
March 9	Dorothy	28 Days in the Valley	Hard rock, psychedelic rock, blues rock	Roc Nation	
March 9	Editors	Violence	Alternative rock, electronic rock, new wave	PIAS	
March 9	George FitzGerald	All That Must Be		Double Six	
March 9	Haley Heynderickx	I Need to Start a Garden	Indie rock	Mama Bird Recording Co.	
March 9	Judas Priest	Firepower	Heavy metal	Epic	
March 9	Kraus	Path	Shoegaze	Terrible	
March 9	Lil Yachty	Lil Boat 2	Hip-hop	Quality Control, Capitol, Motown	
March 9	Logic	Bobby Tarantino II	Hip-hop	Def Jam	
March 9	Ministry	AmeriKKKant	Industrial metal	Nuclear Blast	
March 9	Myles Kennedy	Year of the Tiger		Napalm	
March 9	Nathaniel Rateliffe & the Night Sweats	Tearing at the Seams	Soul, roots rock	Stax	
March 9	The Neighbourhood	The Neighbourhood	Electropop, ambient	Columbia	
March 9	Ocean Alley	Chiaroscuro	Reggae rock	UNFD, Sony Music Australia	
March 9	of Montreal	White Is Relic/Irrealis Mood	Neo-psychedelia, progressive pop, electropop	Polyvinyl	
March 9	Oneida	Romance		Joyful Noise	
March 9	Remo Drive	Pop Music		Epitaph	
March 9	Suicidal Tendencies	Get Your Fight On!		Suicidal Records	
March 9	Teenage Wrist	Chrome Neon Jesus	Alternative rock, shoegaze, emo	Epitaph	
March 9	Three Days Grace	Outsider	Post-grunge, hard rock, alternative metal	RCA	
March 9	Young Fathers	Cocoa Sugar	Indietronica, neo soul	Ninja Tune	
March 14	Shonen Knife	Alive! In Osaka	Pop-punk	Good Charamel, P-Vine	
March 16	Bantu Continua Uhuru Consciousness	Emakhosini			
March 16	Bill Frisell	Music IS	Jazz	Okeh	
March 16	Bishop Nehru	Elevators: Act I & II		Nehruvia	
March 16	Chuck Strangers	Consumers Park		Nature Sounds	
March 16	The Decemberists	I'll Be Your Girl	Folk rock, synth-pop	Capitol, Rough Trade	
March 16	Fickle Friends	You Are Someone Else		Polydor	
March 16	The Fratellis	In Your Own Sweet Time	Alternative rock	Cooking Vinyl	
March 16	Hot Snakes	Jericho Sirens	Post-hardcore	Sub Pop	
March 16	Laura Pausini	Fatti sentire	Pop	Warner Music	
March 16	The Magic Gang	The Magic Gang		Warner Music UK	
March 16	Meshell Ndegeocello	Ventriloquism	R&B, pop	Naïve	
March 16	Mount Eerie	Now Only		P.W. Elverum & Sun Ltd.	
March 16	PRhyme	PRhyme 2	Hip-hop	PRhyme Records, INgrooves	
March 16	Rich Homie Quan	Rich as in Spirit	Hip-hop	RAIS, Motown	
March 16	Rivers of Nihil	Where Owls Know My Name	Technical death metal, progressive death metal	Metal Blade	
March 16	Scotty McCreery	Seasons Change	Country	Triple Tigers	
March 16	Snoop Dogg	Bible of Love	Gospel, Christian hip-hop, R&B	RCA Inspiration, All the Time Entertainment	
March 16	Stone Temple Pilots	Stone Temple Pilots	Alternative rock, hard rock	Rhino	
March 16	Various artists	Love, Simon	Indie pop	RCA, Sony Music	
March 16	XXXTentacion	?	Hip-hop, alternative rock, emo	Bad Vibes Forever, Caroline, Capitol	
March 16	Yo La Tengo	There's a Riot Going On	Indie rock	Matador	
March 22	The Ex	27 passports	Post-punk, art punk	Norman Records, Ex Records	
March 23	At Wendys	We Beefin?	Hip-hop	Six Course, Inc.	
March 23	Blessthefall	Hard Feelings	Metalcore, post-hardcore, alternative rock	Rise	
March 23	Bonny Doon	Longwave		Woodsist	
March 23	Courtney Marie Andrews	May Your Kindness Remain	Americana, indie folk	Fat Possum	
March 23	Dami Im	I Hear a Song		Sony Music Australia	
March 23	Diplo	California	Hip-hop, electronic	Mad Decent	
March 23	Erland Cooper	Solan Goose			
March 23	George Ezra	Staying at Tamara's	Folk pop	Columbia	
March 23	Guided by Voices	Space Gun	Indie rock	Rockathon Records	
March 23	Jack White	Boarding House Reach	Blues rock	Third Man, Columbia, XL	
March 23	Mark Pritchard	The Four Worlds	Electronic, ambient	Warp	
March 23	The Messthetics	The Messthetics	Rock	Dischord	
March 23	Preoccupations	New Material		Jagjaguwar, Flemish Eye	
March 23	Sunflower Bean	Twentytwo in Blue	Glam rock, indie rock, pop	Mom + Pop	
March 23	Toni Braxton	Sex & Cigarettes	R&B, soul	Def Jam	
March 23	Waka Flocka Flame, Zaytoven and Big Bank Black	Brick House Boyz		Brick Squad Monopoly	
March 30	Amen Dunes	Freedom	Indie rock, folk, psychedelic folk	Sacred Bones	
March 30	Bettye LaVette	Things Have Changed	R&B, Americana	Verve	
March 30	Czarface and MF Doom	Czarface Meets Metal Face	Hip-hop	Get On Down, Silver Age	
March 30	deadmau5	Where's the Drop?	Classical, electronica, ambient	mau5trap	
March 30	Doja Cat	Amala	Hip-hop, dancehall, R&B	Kemosabe, RCA	
March 30	Escape the Fate	I Am Human	Pop-metal, post-hardcore	Eleven Seven	
March 30	Frankie Cosmos	Vessel	Indie pop	Sub Pop	
March 30	The Garden	Mirror Might Steal Your Charm		Epitaph	
March 30	Hayley Kiyoko	Expectations	Electropop	Empire, Atlantic	
March 30	Jean Grae and Quelle Chris	Everything's Fine	Experimental hip-hop, jazz rap	Mello Music	
March 30	Kacey Musgraves	Golden Hour	Country	MCA Nashville	
March 30	Kate Nash	Yesterday Was Forever	Indie rock, garage punk, punk rock	Girl Gang	
March 30	Lindi Ortega	Liberty	Country	Shadowbox Records	
March 30	Red Sun Rising	Thread	Alternative rock, hard rock	Razor & Tie	
March 30	Rich the Kid	The World Is Yours	Hip-hop	Interscope, Rich Forever	
March 30	Sons of Kemet	Your Queen Is a Reptile	Avant-garde jazz	Impulse!	
March 30	Steffany Gretzinger	Blackout	Worship, pop	Bethel Music	
March 30	Tiësto	I Like It Loud		Musical Freedom, Spinnin'	
March 30	Trembling Bells	Dungeness		Tin Angel	
March 30	U-God	Venom	Hip-hop	Babygrande	
March 30	The Vaccines	Combat Sports	Indie rock, garage rock	Columbia	
March 30	The Voidz	Virtue	Neo-psychedelia, new wave, psychedelic pop	Cult, RCA	
March 30	The Weeknd	My Dear Melancholy	Alternative R&B, R&B, electropop	XO, Republic	

== Second quarter ==
=== April ===
List of albums released in April 2018
Go to: January | February | March | April | May | June | July | August | September | October | November | December | Back to top
Release date	Artist	Album	Genre	Label	Ref.
April 4	BTS	Face Yourself	J-pop, hip-hop	Big Hit, Universal Music Japan, Def Jam	
April 5	The Caretaker	Everywhere at the End of Time - Stage 4	Ambient, dark ambient, drone	History Always Favours the Winners	
April 5	Saba	Care for Me	Hip-hop, jazz rap	Saba Pivot, LLC.	
April 6	Alina Baraz	The Color of You		Mom + Pop	
April 6	Blackberry Smoke	Find a Light	Southern rock, country rock	3 Legged Records	
April 6	Cardi B	Invasion of Privacy	Hip-hop	Atlantic	
April 6	CNCO	CNCO	Latin pop, reggaeton	Sony Latin	
April 6	Daniel Avery	Song for Alpha		Mute, Phantasy Sound	
April 6	Dr. Octagon	Moosebumps: An Exploration Into Modern Day Horripilation	Hip-hop	Bulk Recordings	
April 6	E-40 and B-Legit	Connected and Respected	Hip-hop	Heavy on the Grind	
April 6	Eels	The Deconstruction	Indie rock	E Works, PIAS	
April 6	En Vogue	Electric Café	R&B	eOne	
April 6	Famous Dex	Dex Meets Dexter	Hip-hop, trap	Rich Forever, 300	
April 6	Flatbush Zombies	Vacation in Hell	Hip-hop	Glorious Dead Recordings, ADA	
April 6	Gin Wigmore	Ivory	Alternative rock, blues, blue-eyed soul	Island Records Australia	
April 6	Goat Girl	Goat Girl	Post-punk	Rough Trade	
April 6	Joe Lovano and Dave Douglas Sound Prints	Scandal		Greenleaf	
April 6	Kali Uchis	Isolation	R&B, neo soul, bossa nova	Rinse, Virgin, Universal	
April 6	King Crimson	Live in Vienna	Progressive rock	Discipline Global Mobile	
April 6	Hinds	I Don't Run	Garage rock	Lucky Number Music, Mom + Pop	
April 6	Hop Along	Bark Your Head Off, Dog	Indie rock	Saddle Creek	
April 6	Kamelot	The Shadow Theory	Symphonic metal, progressive metal, power metal	Napalm	
April 6	Kylie Minogue	Golden	Country pop	Darenote, BMG	
April 6	Lil Xan	Total Xanarchy	Hip-hop, trap, emo rap	Columbia	
April 6	Mastersystem	Dance Music		Physical Education Recordings	
April 6	Panopticon	The Scars of Man on the Once Nameless Wilderness	Black metal, Americana		
April 6	Ross from Friends	Aphelion		Brainfeeder	
April 6	Sloan	12	Rock, power pop	Murderecords, Yep Roc	
April 6	Thirty Seconds to Mars	America	Electronica, art pop	Interscope	
April 6	Tina Arena	Quand tout Recommence	Pop	Play Two	
April 6	Tom Misch	Geography		Beyond the Groove	
April 6	Underoath	Erase Me	Alternative rock, post-hardcore	Fearless	
April 6	Unknown Mortal Orchestra	Sex & Food	Funk, rock, folk	Jagjaguwar	
April 6	Various artists	Revamp: Reimagining the Songs of Elton John & Bernie Taupin		Island	
April 6	Various artists	Restoration: Reimagining the Songs of Elton John and Bernie Taupin		Universal Nashville	
April 6	The Wonder Years	Sister Cities	Alternative rock, emo	Hopeless	
April 6	Wye Oak	The Louder I Call, the Faster It Runs		Merge	
April 9	Twice	What Is Love?	K-pop, bubblegum pop, dance	JYP, Republic	
April 11	Haru Nemuri	Haru to Shura			
April 12	Bazzi	Cosmic	Pop, R&B	iamcosmic, Atlantic	
April 13	Beth Hart	Front and Center – Live from New York	Jazz, soul blues, piano blues	Provogue	
April 13	Black Dresses	Wasteisolation	Electro-industrial, noise		
April 13	Brazilian Girls	Let's Make Love		Six Degrees	
April 13	Breaking Benjamin	Ember	Post-grunge, nu metal, hard rock	Hollywood	
April 13	Carnage	Battered Bruised & Bloody	Trap, hip-hop	Heavyweight Records, BMG	
April 13	Confidence Man	Confident Music for Confident People	Dance-pop	Heavenly	
April 13	The Damned	Evil Spirits	Punk rock	Search and Destroy, Spinefarm	
April 13	Gurrumul	Djarimirri (Child of the Rainbow)	World, classical crossover	SkinnyFish Music	
April 13	John Prine	The Tree of Forgiveness	Country folk, Americana	Oh Boy	
April 13	Josh T. Pearson	The Straight Hits!		Mute	
April 13	Juliana Hatfield	Juliana Hatfield Sings Olivia Newton-John	Alternative rock, indie rock	American Laundromat	
April 13	King Tuff	The Other	Rock	Sub Pop	
April 13	Laura Veirs	The Lookout	Indie folk	Bella Union, Raven Marching Band Records	
April 13	Loski	Call Me Loose		Since '93	
April 13	Manic Street Preachers	Resistance Is Futile	Alternative rock	Columbia, Sony Music	
April 13	Mouse on Mars	Dimensional People	Electronic	Thrill Jockey	
April 13	Mr. Fingers	Cerebral Hemispheres	Electronic	Alleviated Records	
April 13	Nothing,Nowhere	Ruiner	Emo rap, indie rock, emo	Fueled by Ramen	
April 13	Novelist	Novelist Guy			
April 13	A Place to Bury Strangers	Pinned		Dead Oceans	
April 13	Princess Nokia	A Girl Cried Red		Rough Trade	
April 13	Prof	Pookie Baby		Rhymesayers	
April 13	Rival Consoles	Persona		Erased Tapes	
April 13	Sarah Davachi	Let Night Come on Bells End the Day		Recital	
April 13	Smokepurpp and Murda Beatz	Bless Yo Trap	Hip-hop, trap	Alamo, Interscope	
April 13	Sofi Tukker	Treehouse	House	Ultra Music	
April 13	Tinashe	Joyride	Alternative R&B	RCA	
April 13	War on Women	Capture the Flag		Bridge 9	
April 20	Alexis Taylor	Beautiful Thing		Domino	
April 20	Bishop Briggs	Church of Scars	Indie pop	Island, Teleport Records	
April 20	Brothers Osborne	Port Saint Joe	Country	EMI Nashville	
April 20	Bullet	Dust to Gold	Heavy metal	SPV/Steamhammer	
April 20	Denmark Vessey	Sun Go Nova	Conscious hip-hop, underground hip-hop, instrumental hip-hop	Mello	
April 20	Drinks	Hippo Lite	Avant-pop	Drag City	
April 20	J. Cole	KOD	Conscious hip-hop, jazz rap	Dreamville, Roc Nation, Interscope	
April 20	John Maus	Addendum		Ribbon	
April 20	Kimbra	Primal Heart	Pop	Warner Bros.	
April 20	Martin Speake	Intention		Ubuntu Music	
April 20	Melvins	Pinkus Abortion Technician	Alternative rock, psychedelic rock, experimental rock	Ipecac	
April 20	My Indigo	My Indigo	Indie pop	BMG	
April 20	Mýa	T.K.O. (The Knock Out)	R&B	Planet 9, MGM, The Orchard	
April 20	Nines	Crop Circle	British hip-hop	XL	
April 20	Pennywise	Never Gonna Die		Epitaph	
April 20	A Perfect Circle	Eat the Elephant	Progressive rock, hard rock	BMG	
April 20	Samantha Jade	Best of My Love	Pop, dance-pop, disco	Sony Music Australia	
April 20	Sleep	The Sciences	Doom metal, stoner metal, space rock	Third Man	
April 20	Sting and Shaggy	44/876	Reggae	A&M, Interscope, Cherrytree Records	
April 20	Stryper	God Damn Evil	Christian metal	Frontiers	
April 20	Terence Blanchard	Live	Jazz	Blue Note	
April 20	Tesseract	Sonder	Progressive metal, djent	Kscope	
April 21	Czarface and MF Doom	Man's Worst Enemy		Silver Age	
April 21	Raury	The Woods		Raury	
April 26	Autechre	NTS Sessions 1–4	Electronic	Warp	
April 27	Anne-Marie	Speak Your Mind	Pop, EDM	Major Tom's, Asylum	
April 27	The Armed	Only Love			
April 27	Blossoms	Cool Like You	Indie pop, pop rock	Virgin EMI	
April 27	Catrin Finch and Seckou Keita	SOAR			
April 27	Dr. Dog	Critical Equation	Indie rock, blues rock	Thirty Tigers	
April 27	Elohim	Elohim	Electropop	BMG	
April 27	Forth Wanderers	Forth Wanderers		Sub Pop	
April 27	Hawthorne Heights	Bad Frequencies	Post-hardcore, emo, pop-punk	Pure Noise	
April 27	God Is an Astronaut	Epitaph	Post-rock	Napalm	
April 27	Godsmack	When Legends Rise	Hard rock	BMG	
April 27	Grouper	Grid of Points	Ambient, dream pop	Kranky	
April 27	Janelle Monáe	Dirty Computer	Pop, funk, hip-hop	Wondaland, Bad Boy, Atlantic	
April 27	Kasey Chambers and the Fireside Disciples	Campfire	Country	Warner Music Australasia	
April 27	Keith Urban	Graffiti U	Country pop	Capitol Nashville	
April 27	Matt Cardle	Time to Be Alive		Sony Music	
April 27	Missy Higgins	Solastalgia	Pop	Eleven: A Music Company	
April 27	Ms Banks	The Coldest Winter Ever			
April 27	Okkervil River	In the Rainbow Rain	Indie pop, art rock	ATO	
April 27	Poo Bear	Poo Bear Presents Bearthday Music		Capitol	
April 27	Post Malone	Beerbongs & Bentleys	Pop, hip-hop, R&B	Republic	
April 27	Saara Aalto	Wild Wild Wonderland	Pop	Warner Music	
April 27	Speedy Ortiz	Twerp Verse	Indie rock	Carpark	
April 27	Steve Angello	Human	Progressive house, electro, synthwave	Size Records	
April 27	Titãs	Doze Flores Amarelas: Act I	Rock	Universal Music Brasil	
April 27	Van Morrison	You're Driving Me Crazy	Jazz	Sony Legacy	
April 27	Wiley	Godfather II		Chasing The Art	
April 27	Willie Nelson	Last Man Standing	Country	Legacy	
April 27	YoungBoy Never Broke Again	Until Death Call My Name	Gangsta rap, trap	Never Broke Again, Atlantic	

=== May ===
List of albums released in May 2018
Go to: January | February | March | April | May | June | July | August | September | October | November | December | Back to top
Release date	Artist	Album	Genre	Label	Ref.
May 4	Belly	Dove	Alternative rock	Belly Touring	
May 4	Black Moth Super Rainbow	Panic Blooms	Electronic	Rad Cult	
May 4	BlocBoy JB	Simi	Hip-hop, trap	Bloc Nation	
May 4	Cut Worms	Hollow Ground	Indie pop	Jagjaguwar	
May 4	DJ Koze	Knock Knock	House, deep house, techno	Pampa Records	
May 4	Eleanor Friedberger	Rebound	Soft rock, pop	Frenchkiss	
May 4	Frank Turner	Be More Kind	Indie rock, indie folk	Xtra Mile, Polydor	
May 4	Gaz Coombes	World's Strongest Man	Rock	Caroline International, Hot Fruit Records	
May 4	Ghastly	The Mystifying Oracle	Dubstep, bass		
May 4	Grailknights	Knightfall	Power metal, heavy metal, melodic death metal	Intono Records	
May 4	Iceage	Beyondless	Post-punk	Matador	
May 4	Ihsahn	Ámr	Progressive metal, post-black metal	Candlelight	
May 4	Jack Ladder and the Dreamlanders	Blue Poles		Terrible	
May 4	Joe Armon-Jones	Starting Today		Brownswood	
May 4	Jon Hopkins	Singularity	Electronic, ambient	Domino	
May 4	Kenny Barron	Concentric Circles	Jazz	Blue Note	
May 4	Lake Street Dive	Free Yourself Up	Pop, indie pop	Nonesuch	
May 4	Laura Jurd and Dinosaur	Wonder Trail		Edition	
May 4	Leon Bridges	Good Thing		Columbia	
May 4	Lucrecia Dalt	Anticlines		RVNG	
May 4	Middle Kids	Lost Friends		EMI, Universal Music Australia, Domino	
May 4	Plan B	Heaven Before All Hell Breaks Loose	Soul, R&B, hip-hop	Atlantic	
May 4	Preme	Light of Day		RCA	
May 4	Rae Sremmurd	SR3MM	Hip-hop	Ear Drummer, Interscope	
May 4	Royce da 5'9"	Book of Ryan	Hip-hop	Heaven Studios, eOne	
May 4	Shinedown	Attention Attention	Hard rock, pop rock, alternative rock	Atlantic	
May 4	Skating Polly	The Make It All Show	Punk rock, indie pop	El Camino	
May 4	Titãs	Doze Flores Amarelas: Act II	Rock	Universal Music Brasil	
May 4	Tove Styrke	Sway	Electropop	RCA	
May 4	Tropical Fuck Storm	A Laughing Death in Meatspace	Punk blues, art punk, glam rock	Mistletone, Joyful Noise	
May 4	Venetian Snares and Daniel Lanois	Venetian Snares x Daniel Lanois		Timesig, Planet Mu	
May 4	Yonatan Gat	Universalists	Punk rock, free jazz, psychedelic rock	Joyful Noise	
May 8	Little Big	Antipositive, Pt. 1	Dance, rave	Little Big Family	
May 11	Arctic Monkeys	Tranquility Base Hotel & Casino	Psychedelic pop, lounge, space rock	Domino	
May 11	Bad Wolves	Disobey	Groove metal, heavy metal, hard rock	Eleven Seven	
May 11	Beach House	7	Dream pop, shoegaze, psychedelic pop	Sub Pop, Bella Union, Mistletone	
May 11	Bladee	Red Light	Cloud rap	Year0001	
May 11	The Body	I Have Fought Against It, but I Can't Any Longer.	Noise, power electronics	Thrill Jockey	
May 11	Brent Cobb	Providence Canyon		Elektra	
May 11	Carla Bozulich	Quieter		Constellation	
May 11	Charlie Puth	Voicenotes	Pop, R&B	Atlantic	
May 11	Dave Holland	Uncharted Territories	Free jazz	Dare2 Records	
May 11	Idris Ackamoor	An Angel Fell		!K7	
May 11	Illuminati Hotties	Kiss Yr Frenemies	Rock	Tiny Engines	
May 11	Jess Williamson	Cosmic Wink	Indie folk	Mexican Summer	
May 11	Junglepussy	JP3			
May 11	Loreena McKennitt	Lost Souls	Folk, world, Celtic	Quinlan Road	
May 11	La Luz	Floating Features		Hardly Art	
May 11	Mark Kozelek	Mark Kozelek		Caldo Verde	
May 11	Playboi Carti	Die Lit	Hip-hop, trap	AWGE, Interscope	
May 11	Ry Cooder	The Prodigal Son	American roots, blues rock	Perro Verde, Concord	
May 11	Sevendust	All I See Is War	Alternative metal, hard rock	Rise	
May 11	Simian Mobile Disco	Murmurations		Wichita	
May 11	Ski Mask the Slump God	Beware the Book of Eli	Hip-hop, psychedelic rap	Victor Victor, Republic	
May 11	Tee Grizzley	Activated	Hip-hop, trap	300	
May 11	Titãs	Doze Flores Amarelas: Act III	Rock	Universal Music Brasil	
May 15	Lil B	Platinum Flame			
May 15	Skee Mask	Compro		Ilian Tape	
May 18	Amorphis	Queen of Time	Progressive metal, melodic death metal	Nuclear Blast	
May 18	Ash	Islands	Power pop	Infectious, BMG	
May 18	At the Gates	To Drink from the Night Itself	Melodic death metal	Century Media	
May 18	Big Ups	Two Parts Together		Exploding in Sound	
May 18	BTS	Love Yourself: Tear	K-pop, hip-hop, alternative R&B	Big Hit, iriver	
May 18	Burn the Priest	Legion: XX	Crossover thrash, hardcore punk, sludge metal	Epic, Nuclear Blast	
May 18	Courtney Barnett	Tell Me How You Really Feel	Indie rock, alternative rock	Milk!, Mom + Pop, Marathon Artists	
May 18	Elza Soares	Deus é Mulher		Deckdisc	
May 18	Fatoumata Diawara	Fenfo (Something to Say)			
May 18	Five Finger Death Punch	And Justice for None	Heavy metal, hard rock, nu metal	Prospect Park	
May 18	Gas	Rausch	Ambient, ambient techno	Kompakt	
May 18	Half Man Half Biscuit	No-One Cares About Your Creative Hub So Get Your Fuckin' Hedge Cut	Post punk	Probe Plus	
May 18	James Bay	Electric Light	Rock, pop, R&B	Virgin EMI	
May 18	James Ferraro	Four Pieces for Mirai (Overture)	Electronic, experimental		
May 18	Kyle	Light of Mine	Pop rap	Independently Popular, Atlantic	
May 18	Lil Baby	Harder Than Ever	Hip-hop, trap	4 Pockets Full, Wolfpack Music Group, Quality Control	
May 18	Maluma	F.A.M.E.	Latin pop	Sony Music Latin	
May 18	Mary Lattimore	Hundreds of Days		Ghostly International	
May 18	Nav	Reckless	Hip-hop, trap	XO, Republic	
May 18	Now, Now	Saved	Indie pop	Trans- Records	
May 18	Parquet Courts	Wide Awake!	Indie rock, punk rock, dance-punk	Rough Trade	
May 18	Ryley Walker	Deafman Glance	Psychedelic folk, folk rock	Dead Oceans	
May 18	Stephen Malkmus and the Jicks	Sparkle Hard	Indie rock	Matador, Domino	
May 18	TT	LoveLaws	Downtempo	LoveLeaks	
May 19	Brad Mehldau	Seymour Reads the Constitution!	Jazz	Nonesuch	
May 22	Christeene	Basura			
May 22	Parliament	Medicaid Fraud Dogg	Funk, hip-hop, R&B	C Kunspyruhzy	
May 23	Juice Wrld	Goodbye & Good Riddance	Emo rap	Grade A, Interscope	
May 23	Niki	Zephyr	R&B	88rising, Empire	
May 24	G-Eazy	The Vault		RCA	
May 25	ASAP Rocky	Testing	Experimental hip-hop, psychedelic	ASAP Worldwide, Polo Grounds, RCA	
May 25	The Beat	Here We Go Love	Reggae rock, ska	Here We Go	
May 25	Chvrches	Love Is Dead	Synth-pop	Goodbye, Virgin	
May 25	Dear Nora	Skulls Example	Indie folk, indie pop, indie rock	Orindal Records	
May 25	J Balvin	Vibras	Pop, reggaeton	Universal Latin	
May 25	Jenny Hval	The Long Sleep		Sacred Bones	
May 25	Jessie J	R.O.S.E.		Republic	
May 25	Jonathan Davis	Black Labyrinth	Alternative metal, alternative rock, electronic rock	Sumerian	
May 25	Joshua Redman, Ron Miles, Scott Colley and Brian Blade	Still Dreaming	Jazz	Nonesuch	
May 25	Kamaal Williams	The Return		Black Focus	
May 25	Lordi	Sexorcism		AFM	
May 25	Prefuse 73	Sacrifices		Lex	
May 25	Pusha T	Daytona	Hip-hop	GOOD, Def Jam	
May 25	Shawn Mendes	Shawn Mendes	Pop	Island	
May 25	Shygirl	Cruel Practice		Nuxxe	
May 25	Snow Patrol	Wildness	Alternative rock, indie pop, pop rock	Polydor	
May 25	Svalbard	It's Hard to Have Hope	Post-hardcore, post-metal	Holy Roar	
May 25	Wooden Shjips	V.		Thrill Jockey	
May 28	Shinee	The Story of Light	K-pop, R&B, tropical house	SM, iRiver	
May 29	Thou	The House Primordial		Robotic Empire	
May 30	Tierra Whack	Whack World	Hip-hop	Interscope	
May 31	Thou	Inconsolable		Robotic Empire	
May 31	Waka Flocka Flame	Big Homie Flocka		Brick Squad Monopoly	

=== June ===
List of albums released in June 2018
Go to: January | February | March | April | May | June | July | August | September | October | November | December | Back to top
Release date	Artist	Album	Genre	Label	Ref.
June 1	Ben Howard	Noonday Dream	Indie folk, psychedelic folk	Island	
June 1	Black Thought	Streams of Thought, Vol. 1	Hip-hop	Human Re Sources	
June 1	Bodega	Endless Scroll		What's Your Rupture?	
June 1	The Brian Jonestown Massacre	Something Else		A Records	
June 1	Father John Misty	God's Favorite Customer	Soft rock, folk rock, baroque pop	Sub Pop, Bella Union	
June 1	Ghost	Prequelle	Hard rock, arena rock, heavy metal	Loma Vista	
June 1	Jamie Isaac	(04:30) Idler	Bossa nova, electronic, jazz	Marathon Artists	
June 1	Kanye West	Ye	Hip-hop	GOOD, Def Jam	
June 1	Kara Grainger	Living with Your Ghost	Roots, blues, soul	Station House Records	
June 1	Maps & Atlases	Lightlessness Is Nothing New	Indie pop	Barsuk	
June 1	Mazzy Star	Still	Psychedelic rock	Rhymes of an Hour	
June 1	Natalie Prass	The Future and the Past		ATO	
June 1	Neko Case	Hell-On	Alternative country	Anti-	
June 1	Norma Waterson, Eliza Carthy and the Gift Band	Anchor		Topic	
June 1	Oneohtrix Point Never	Age Of	Electronic, avant-garde, baroque pop	Warp	
June 1	Owl City	Cinematic	Synth-pop, dream pop	Sky Harbor Records	
June 1	The Presets	Hi Viz	Electronic	Modular, EMI	
June 1	Roger Daltrey	As Long as I Have You		Polydor	
June 1	Ski Mask the Slump God	Get Dough Presents Ski Mask the Slump God		Get Dough	
June 1	Slapshot	Make America Hate Again	Hardcore	Bridge 9	
June 1	Susheela Raman	Ghost Gamelan			
June 1	Tancred	Nightstand		Polyvinyl	
June 2	Joan of Arc	1984	Indie rock	Joyful Noise	
June 6	Lovebites	Battle Against Damnation	Power metal	Victor	
June 8	Angélique Kidjo	Remain in Light			
June 8	Busdriver	Electricity Is on Our Side	Hip-hop	Temporary Whatever	
June 8	Chancha Vía Circuito	Bienaventuranza		Wonderwheel Recordings	
June 8	Dance Gavin Dance	Artificial Selection	Post-hardcore, pop-punk, experimental rock	Rise	
June 8	Dave Matthews Band	Come Tomorrow	Rock	RCA	
June 8	Dierks Bentley	The Mountain	Country	Capitol Nashville	
June 8	Eartheater	Irisiri	Experimental, electronica	PAN	
June 8	Flasher	Constant Image	Post-punk, indie rock	Domino	
June 8	Future and various artists	Superfly	Hip-hop, trap	Freebandz, A1, Epic	
June 8	The Get Up Kids	Kicker	Emo, pop-punk	Polyvinyl	
June 8	Gruff Rhys	Babelsberg		Rough Trade	
June 8	Howlin Rain	The Alligator Bride		Silver Current Records	
June 8	Joana Marte	De Outro Lugar	Alternative rock, psychedelic rock, progressive rock	Urtiga	
June 8	Jorja Smith	Lost & Found	R&B, soul, trip hop	FAMM	
June 8	Kadhja Bonet	Childqueen		Fat Possum	
June 8	Kids See Ghosts	Kids See Ghosts	Hip-hop	GOOD, Def Jam	
June 8	Lily Allen	No Shame	Electropop	Parlophone, Regal	
June 8	Lykke Li	So Sad So Sexy	Pop, R&B	RCA	
June 8	Matt Maltese	Bad Contestant		Atlantic Records UK	
June 8	Michael Franks	The Music in My Head	Jazz, vocal jazz, smooth jazz	Shanachie	
June 8	Proc Fiskal	Insula		Hyperdub	
June 8	Serpentwithfeet	Soil		Secretly Canadian, Tri Angle	
June 8	Sheppard	Watching the Sky	Indie pop, indie rock	Empire of Song	
June 8	Snail Mail	Lush	Indie rock	Matador	
June 8	Spiritual Cramp	Police State		Deranged	
June 8	Sugarland	Bigger	Country	Big Machine	
June 8	Tomb Mold	Manor of Infinite Forms		20 Buck Spin	
June 8	Uniform and the Body	Mental Wounds Not Healing		Sacred Bones	
June 8	Yob	Our Raw Heart	Doom metal, stoner metal, post-metal	Relapse	
June 8	Zeal & Ardor	Stranger Fruit	Avant-garde metal, black metal, soul	MVKA Records	
June 15	5 Seconds of Summer	Youngblood	Pop	Capitol, Hi or Hey	
June 15	Buddy Guy	The Blues Is Alive and Well	Blues	RCA, Silvertone	
June 15	Christina Aguilera	Liberation	Hip-hop, R&B	RCA	
June 15	Chromeo	Head over Heels	Funk	Big Beat, Atlantic	
June 15	DNCE	People to People		Republic	
June 15	Gin Blossoms	Mixed Reality	Alternative rock	Cleopatra	
June 15	Jay Rock	Redemption	West Coast hip-hop	Top Dawg, Interscope	
June 15	Jess & Matt	Songs from the Village	Pop	Sony Music Australia	
June 15	Johnny Marr	Call the Comet	Indie rock	New Voodoo, Warner Bros.	
June 15	Leon Vynehall	Nothing Is Still		Ninja Tune	
June 15	Madball	For the Cause	Hardcore	Nuclear Blast	
June 15	Marisa Anderson	Cloud Corner	Ambient, American folk, Tuareg music	Thrill Jockey	
June 15	Mayday Parade	Sunnyland	Pop-punk, emo	Rise	
June 15	Melody's Echo Chamber	Bon Voyage	Psychedelic pop, tropicália	Domino, Fat Possum	
June 15	Mike Shinoda	Post Traumatic	Hip-hop, rock, electropop	Warner Bros., Machine Shop	
June 15	Nas	Nasir	Hip-hop	Mass Appeal, Def Jam	
June 15	Olivia Chaney	Shelter		Nonesuch	
June 15	Onyx Collective	Lower East Suite Part Three		Big Dada	
June 15	Orange Goblin	The Wolf Bites Back	Heavy metal, stoner metal, blues rock	Candlelight	
June 15	Protomartyr	Consolation	Post-punk, art punk, noise rock	Domino	
June 15	Rico Nasty	Nasty	Trap	Atlantic, Sugar Trap	
June 15	Rolling Blackouts Coastal Fever	Hope Downs	Indie rock	Sub Pop	
June 15	Sophie	Oil of Every Pearl's Un-Insides	Avant-pop, hyperpop, experimental pop	MSMSMSM, Future Classic, Transgressive	
June 15	State Champs	Living Proof	Pop-punk	Pure Noise	
June 16	The Carters	Everything Is Love	Hip-hop	Parkwood, Roc Nation	
June 18	Blawan	Wet Will Always Dry	Techno	Ternesc	
June 20	Pasocom Music Club	Dream Walk			
June 22	Bebe Rexha	Expectations	Pop, electropop	Warner Bros.	
June 22	Binker and Moses	Alive in the East?		Gearbox	
June 22	Dan + Shay	Dan + Shay	Country pop	Warner Nashville	
June 22	Dawes	Passwords	Folk rock, pop rock	Hub Records	
June 22	Death Grips	Year of the Snitch	Punk rap, noise rock	Third Worlds, Harvest	
June 22	Fantastic Negrito	Please Don't Be Dead	Blues rock	Cooking Vinyl, Blackball Universe	
June 22	Freddie Gibbs	Freddie	Hip-hop, R&B	ESGN, Empire	
June 22	Gang Gang Dance	Kazuashita		4AD	
June 22	Impending Doom	The Sin and Doom Vol. II	Deathcore	EOne	
June 22	Jack River	Sugar Mountain		I Oh You	
June 22	Kamasi Washington	Heaven and Earth	Jazz, jazz-funk, orchestral jazz	Young	
June 22	Marshmello	Joytime II	Future bass, trap	Joytime Collective	
June 22	Martyn	Voids		Ostgut Ton	
June 22	Nine Inch Nails	Bad Witch	Industrial rock	The Null Corporation, Capitol	
June 22	The Orb	No Sounds Are Out of Bounds	Ambient house	Cooking Vinyl	
June 22	Panic! at the Disco	Pray for the Wicked	Pop	Fueled by Ramen, DCD2	
June 22	Priscilla Renea	Coloured	Americana, country soul, R&B	Thirty Tigers	
June 22	Teyana Taylor	K.T.S.E.	R&B	GOOD Music	
June 22	Vein	Errorzone	Metalcore, hardcore punk, nu metal	Closed Casket Activities	
June 22	Westside Gunn	Supreme Blientele	Hip-hop	Griselda, Empire	
June 27	03 Greedo	God Level		Alamo, Sony Music	
June 27	Hikaru Utada	Hatsukoi	J-pop, soul, R&B	Epic Records Japan, Sony Music Japan	
June 29	Bullet for My Valentine	Gravity	Alternative metal, nu metal, post-hardcore	Spinefarm	
June 29	Charles Lloyd, the Marvels, and Lucinda Williams	Vanished Gardens	Jazz	Blue Note	
June 29	Drake	Scorpion	Hip-hop, R&B, pop	OVO Sound, Young Money, Cash Money	
June 29	Florence and the Machine	High as Hope	Indie pop, art pop, orchestral rock	Virgin EMI, Republic	
June 29	Gorillaz	The Now Now	Funk, synth-pop, new wave	Parlophone, Warner Bros.	
June 29	The Innocence Mission	Sun on the Square	Folk pop, chamber folk	Badman Recording Co., Bella Union, P-Vine	
June 29	Jim James	Uniform Distortion	Indie rock	ATO	
June 29	John Coltrane	Both Directions at Once: The Lost Album	Jazz	Impulse!	
June 29	K-Trap	The Re-Up			
June 29	Let's Eat Grandma	I'm All Ears	Avant-pop, synth-pop	Transgressive	

== Third quarter ==
=== July ===
List of albums released in July 2018
Go to: January | February | March | April | May | June | July | August | September | October | November | December | Back to top
Release date	Artist	Album	Genre	Label	Ref.
July 2	Trust Fund	Bringing the Backline			
July 3	Mom Jeans	Puppy Love		Counter Intuitive, Big Scary Monsters	
July 4	Red Velvet	Cookie Jar	K-pop, electropop, synth-pop	Avex Trax	
July 6	Ana Silvera	Oracles		Gearbox	
July 6	DevilDriver	Outlaws 'til the End: Vol. 1	Groove metal, melodic death metal	Napalm	
July 6	Future and Zaytoven	Beast Mode 2	Hip-hop, trap	Freebandz, Epic	
July 6	HMLTD	Hate Music Last Time Delete		RCA	
July 6	Immortal	Northern Chaos Gods	Black metal	Nuclear Blast	
July 6	Meek Mill	Legends of the Summer		Maybach Music, Atlantic	
July 6	Notaker	Erebus I	New beat, wonky, ambient	Mau5trap	
July 6	Odette	To a Stranger		EMI Music Australia	
July 6	Okzharp and Manthe Ribane	Closer Apart		Hyperdub	
July 6	Years & Years	Palo Santo	Dance-pop, electropop	Polydor	
July 9	Smino	4sport			
July 9	Twice	Summer Nights	K-pop, dance	JYP Entertainment, iriver	
July 13	Amy Shark	Love Monster	Indie pop, Alternative rock	Wonderlick Entertainment, Sony Music Australia	
July 13	Anna Meredith	Eighth Grade	Electronic, pop, indie rock	Columbia	
July 13	Armand Hammer	Paraffin	Hip-hop	Backwoodz Studioz	
July 13	Between the Buried and Me	Automata II	Progressive metal, technical death metal	Sumerian	
July 13	Body/Head	The Switch		Matador	
July 13	Capitol K	Goatherder			
July 13	Chief Keef	Mansion Musick			
July 13	Cowboy Junkies	All That Reckoning	Alternative country, rock	Latent, Proper	
July 13	Deafheaven	Ordinary Corrupt Human Love	Blackgaze, post-metal	Anti-, Republic	
July 13	Dirty Projectors	Lamp Lit Prose	Progressive pop	Domino	
July 13	DonChristian	Where There's Smoke			
July 13	Imperial Triumphant	Vile Luxury	Avant-garde metal, blackened death metal, jazz fusion	Gilead Media	
July 13	Lotic	Power	Electronic	Tri Angle	
July 13	Luluc	Sculptor	Indie folk	Sub Pop	
July 13	Marlowe	Marlowe		Mello	
July 13	Nef the Pharaoh and 03 Greedo	Porter 2 Grape		KILFMB, Sick Wid It, Empire	
July 13	Rick Astley	Beautiful Life	Pop, soul	BMG	
July 13	Sylvan LaCue	Florida Man			
July 13	Taco Hemingway	Café Belga	Hip-hop	Taco Corps, Asfalt	
July 13	The Vamps	Night & Day (Day Edition)	Pop	Mercury, Virgin EMI	
July 13	Various artists	Mamma Mia! Here We Go Again		Capitol, Polydor	
July 13	Wet	Still Run	Indie pop	Columbia	
July 13	Wiz Khalifa	Rolling Papers 2	Trap	Taylor Gang, Atlantic	
July 18	DRAM	That's a Girls Name	Soul, funk, hip-hop	Empire, Atlantic	
July 20	88rising	Head in the Clouds	R&B	88rising Records, 12Tone Music	
July 20	Adolescents	Cropduster	Punk rock	Concrete Jungle Records	
July 20	Daron Malakian and Scars on Broadway	Dictator	Hard rock, punk metal	Scarred for Life	
July 20	The Internet	Hive Mind	R&B, funk, hip-hop	Columbia	
July 20	Julian Argüelles	Tonadas		Edition	
July 20	Lori McKenna	The Tree	Americana, country folk	CN Records	
July 20	Meg Myers	Take Me to the Disco	Alternative rock, pop rock	300 Entertainment	
July 20	Ovlov	Tru	Indie rock	Exploding in Sound	
July 20	Powerwolf	The Sacrament of Sin	Power metal, heavy metal, symphonic metal	Napalm	
July 20	Pram	Across the Meridian		Domino	
July 20	Punch Brothers	All Ashore	Progressive bluegrass	Nonesuch	
July 20	Ryan Beatty	Boy in Jeans			
July 20	Skeletonwitch	Devouring Radiant Light	Melodic black metal	Prosthetic	
July 20	Trash Boat	Crown Shyness	Punk rock, melodic hardcore	Hopeless	
July 20	Ty Segall and White Fence	Joy		Drag City	
July 27	Boz Scaggs	Out of the Blues	Blues, rock, R&B	Concord	
July 27	Cody Jinks	Lifers		Rounder	
July 27	Daughtry	Cage to Rattle	Pop rock	RCA	
July 27	Denzel Curry	Ta13oo	Hip-hop	PH, Loma Vista	
July 27	Gaika	Basic Volume	Alternative R&B, electronic	Warp	
July 27	Gia Margaret	There's Always Glimmer	Indie folk	Dalliance Recordings, Orindal Records	
July 27	Halestorm	Vicious	Hard rock, alternative metal, glam metal	Atlantic	
July 27	Iggy Pop	Teatime Dub Encounters	Electronic	Caroline International	
July 27	Jarren Benton	Yuck Fou		Roc Nation	
July 27	Kenny Chesney	Songs for the Saints	Country	Blue Chair Records, Warner Bros. Nashville	
July 27	Niki & Gabi	Individual	Electropop		
July 27	Ross from Friends	Family Portrait	Electronic	Brainfeeder	
July 27	Santigold	I Don't Want: The Gold Fire Sessions	Dancehall	Downtown	
July 27	The Screaming Jets	Gotcha Covered		Dinner for Wolves	
July 27	Thou	Rhea Sylvia		Deathwish	
July 27	Tim Campbell	Electrifying 80s	Pop, pop rock	Encore Records	
July 27	Tony Molina	Kill the Lights		Slumberland	
July 27	Willie Nile	Children of Paradise	Indie rock	River House Records	
July 31	Mid-Air Thief	Crumbling	Folktronica	Mid-Air Thief	

=== August ===
List of albums released in August 2018
Go to: January | February | March | April | May | June | July | August | September | October | November | December | Back to top
Release date	Artist	Album	Genre	Label	Ref.
August 3	Amanda Shires	To the Sunset	Country, Americana	Silver Knife Records	
August 3	Anavitória	O Tempo É Agora		Forasteiro, Universal	
August 3	Choker	Honeybloom		Jet Fuzz	
August 3	Deaf Havana	Rituals		So Recordings	
August 3	Diesel	30: The Greatest Hits		Bloodlines, Universal Music Australia	
August 3	Helena Hauff	Qualm	Techno, acid house, EBM	Ninja Tune	
August 3	Iggy Azalea	Survive the Summer	Hip-hop	Island	
August 3	James	Living in Extraordinary Times	Indie rock	Infectious Music	
August 3	Lovelytheband	Finding It Hard to Smile	Indie pop, pop rock	Another Century	
August 3	Mac Miller	Swimming	Hip-hop, jazz rap	REMember Music, Warner Bros.	
August 3	Moneybagg Yo	Bet on Me		CMG, Bread Gang Entertainment, Interscope	
August 3	Travis Scott	Astroworld	Hip-hop, psychedelic rap	Grand Hustle, Epic, Cactus Jack	
August 3	Trophy Eyes	The American Dream	Pop-punk, punk rock, melodic hardcore	Hopeless	
August 3	YG	Stay Dangerous	Gangsta rap	4Hunnid, CTE, Def Jam	
August 3	YNW Melly	I Am You	Hip-hop	300	
August 8	Iglooghost	Clear Tamei	Wonky, glitch hop, drill 'n' bass	Brainfeeder	
August 8	Iglooghost	Steel Mogu		Brainfeeder	
August 10	As It Is	The Great Depression		Fearless	
August 10	The Coral	Move Through the Dawn	Psychedelic, folk rock	Ignition	
August 10	Foxing	Nearer My God	Indie rock, ambient, electronic	Triple Crown	
August 10	Jake Shears	Jake Shears	Pop, rock, funk	Freida Jean Records	
August 10	Jason Eady	I Travel On		Old Guitar Records	
August 10	Jason Mraz	Know	Pop rock	Atlantic	
August 10	Kathryn Joseph	From When I Wake the Want Is		Rock Action	
August 10	Kollegah and Farid Bang	Platin war gestern		Banger Musik, Alpha Music Empire	
August 10	Lali	Brava	Latin pop	Sony Argentina	
August 10	Louis Cole	Time	Funk	Brainfeeder	
August 10	Moses Sumney	Black in Deep Red, 2014		Jagjaguwar	
August 10	Nef the Pharaoh	The Big Chang Theory		KILFMB, Sick Wid It, Empire	
August 10	Nicki Minaj	Queen	Hip-hop	Young Money, Cash Money	
August 10	Shooter Jennings	Shooter		Elektra	
August 10	The Proclaimers	Angry Cyclist	Country folk, rock	Cooking Vinyl	
August 10	Tirzah	Devotion	Pop	Domino	
August 10	Tomberlin	At Weddings		Saddle Creek	
August 10	Trippie Redd	Life's a Trip	Emo rap, pop-punk	TenThousand Projects, Caroline	
August 14	The Necks	Body		Northern Spy	
August 15	Aminé	OnePointFive	Hip-hop, trap	Republic, CBLN	
August 15	Ayumi Hamasaki	Trouble	J-pop, rock	Avex Trax, Avex Music Creative Inc.	
August 17	Animal Collective	Tangerine Reef	Ambient	Domino	
August 17	Anna Meredith	Anno		Moshi Moshi	
August 17	Ariana Grande	Sweetener	Pop, R&B, trap	Republic	
August 17	Black Tusk	T.C.B.T.	Sludge metal, hardcore punk, stoner metal	Season of Mist	
August 17	Blue October	I Hope You're Happy	Rock	Up/Down Records, Brando Records	
August 17	Bugzy Malone	B. Inspired	Grime, hip-hop		
August 17	Cole Swindell	All of It	Country	Warner Nashville	
August 17	Cory Wong	The Optimist		Cory Wong	
August 17	Death Cab for Cutie	Thank You for Today	Alternative rock, indie pop	Atlantic	
August 17	Doro	Forever Warriors, Forever United	Heavy metal	Nuclear Blast	
August 17	Gabrielle	Under My Skin	Pop, R&B	BMG	
August 17	George Clanton	Slide	Vaporwave, chillwave, synth-pop	100% Electronica	
August 17	Miles Kane	Coup de Grâce	Indie rock, alternative rock	Virgin EMI	
August 17	Mitski	Be the Cowboy	Pop, art pop, indie rock	Dead Oceans	
August 17	Ninja Sex Party	Cool Patrol	Comedy rock		
August 17	Oh Sees	Smote Reverser	Progressive metal, progressive rock, psychedelic rock	Castle Face	
August 17	Slaves	Acts of Fear and Love	Punk rock	Virgin EMI	
August 17	Stefflon Don	Secure	Hip-hop	54 London, Quality Control Music	
August 17	Trevor Powers	Mulberry Violence	Ambient pop	Baby Halo	
August 17	Uniform	The Long Walk	Industrial metal	Sacred Bones	
August 17	Young Thug	Slime Language	Hip-hop, trap	YSL, 300	
August 18	Hermit and the Recluse	Orpheus vs. the Sirens	Abstract hip-hop	Obol for Charon Records	
August 23	Fall Out Boy	Lake Effect Kid	Pop rock, pop-punk	Island, Decaydance	
August 24	Alexander Tucker	Don't Look Away		Thrill Jockey	
August 24	Alice in Chains	Rainier Fog	Doom metal, sludge metal, hard rock	BMG	
August 24	The Amity Affliction	Misery	Metalcore, electronicore	UNFD, Roadrunner	
August 24	Bas	Milky Way	Hip-hop, afrobeats	Dreamville, Interscope	
August 24	Beccy Cole	Lioness	Country	Beccy Cole Music, ABC Music	
August 24	Blood Orange	Negro Swan		Domino	
August 24	The Devil Makes Three	Chains Are Broken	Bluegrass, country, folk	New West	
August 24	Honne	Love Me / Love Me Not		Atlantic	
August 24	Interpol	Marauder	Indie rock	Matador	
August 24	Jain	Souldier	Pop	Spookland, Columbia, Sony Music	
August 24	The Lemon Twigs	Go to School		4AD	
August 24	Liam Payne	First Time		Capitol	
August 24	Nonpoint	X	Alternative metal	Spinefarm	
August 24	Nothing	Dance on the Blacktop	Shoegaze, alternative rock	Relapse	
August 24	Ohmme	Parts	Experimental pop	Joyful Noise	
August 24	Ozuna	Aura	Reggaeton	VP, Dimelo VI, Sony Latin	
August 24	Steady Holiday	Nobody's Watching		Barsuk	
August 24	Tunng	Songs You Make at Night	Folktronica	Full Time Hobby	
August 24	White Denim	Performance		City Slang	
August 28	Danny Brown	Twitch EP	Hip-hop		
August 29	Haru Nemuri	Kick in the World			
August 31	Agent Sasco	Hope River		Epitaph	
August 31	Alkaline Trio	Is This Thing Cursed?	Punk rock	Epitaph	
August 31	Anna Calvi	Hunter		Domino	
August 31	Big Red Machine	Big Red Machine		Jagjaguwar	
August 31	D Double E	Jackuum!		Bluku Music	
August 31	Eminem	Kamikaze	Hip-hop	Aftermath, Interscope, Shady	
August 31	Emma Blackery	Villains	Pop	RWG Records	
August 31	Idles	Joy as an Act of Resistance	Punk rock	Partisan	
August 31	KEN Mode	Loved			
August 31	Madeleine Peyroux	Anthem	Vocal jazz	Decca	
August 31	Mogwai	Kin	Post-rock	Rock Action, TRL	
August 31	Tash Sultana	Flow State		Lonely Lands, Sony Music Australia, Mom + Pop Music	
August 31	Thou	Magus	Sludge metal	Sacred Bones	
August 31	Tord Gustavsen Trio	The Other Side	Jazz	ECM	
August 31	Troye Sivan	Bloom	Pop, dance-pop, synth-pop	EMI Australia, Capitol	
August 31	Why Don't We	8 Letters	Pop	Atlantic, Warner	
August 31	Wild Nothing	Indigo	Dream pop, indie pop, space rock	Captured Tracks	

=== September ===
List of albums released in September 2018
Go to: January | February | March | April | May | June | July | August | September | October | November | December | Back to top
Release date	Artist	Album	Genre	Label	Ref.
September 5	Yves Tumor	Safe in the Hands of Love	Electronic, experimental, plunderphonics	Warp	
September 7	Amnesia Scanner	Another Life	Experimental	PAN	
September 7	The Blaze	Dancehall		Animal 63	
September 7	Boston Manor	Welcome to the Neighbourhood	Alternative rock, grunge, emo	Pure Noise	
September 7	Clutch	Book of Bad Decisions	Stoner rock, blues rock	Weathermaker Music	
September 7	Estelle	Lovers Rock	Reggae	VP Records, Established 1980 Records	
September 7	Hozier	Nina Cried Power		Columbia	
September 7	Joey Purp	Quarterthing	Hip-hop	Caroline	
September 7	Korpiklaani	Kulkija	Folk metal	Nuclear Blast	
September 7	Lauren Daigle	Look Up Child	CCM	Centricity	
September 7	Lenny Kravitz	Raise Vibration	Rock	Roxie, BMG	
September 7	Mark Turner and Ethan Iverson	Temporary Kings	Jazz	ECM	
September 7	MNEK	Language	Pop, dance pop, R&B	Virgin EMI	
September 7	Mothers	Render Another Ugly Method		Anti-	
September 7	Oliver Coates	Shelley's on Zenn-La		RVNG	
September 7	Paul McCartney	Egypt Station	Rock	Capitol	
September 7	Paul Simon	In the Blue Light	Pop	Legacy	
September 7	Pig Destroyer	Head Cage	Metalcore, grindcore	Relapse	
September 7	Russ	Zoo	Hip-hop, R&B	Diemon, Columbia	
September 7	Ruston Kelly	Dying Star	Folk rock, alternative country, indie folk	Rounder	
September 7	Satan	Cruel Magic		Metal Blade	
September 7	Spiritualized	And Nothing Hurt	Space rock	Fat Possum, Bella Union	
September 7	Suicideboys	I Want to Die in New Orleans	Trap, hardcore hip-hop	G*59, Caroline	
September 7	Suicidal Tendencies	Still Cyco Punk After All These Years	Hardcore punk	Suicidal Records	
September 7	Teleman	Family of Aliens		Moshi Moshi	
September 7	YBN	YBN: The Mixtape			
September 10	Octavian	Spaceman	Grime	Black Butter	
September 14	6lack	East Atlanta Love Letter	Alternative R&B, soul	LVRN, Interscope	
September 14	Ana Popović	Like It on Top		ArtisteXclusive Records	
September 14	Ann Wilson	Immortal		BMG	
September 14	Aphex Twin	Collapse EP	Electronic, footwork, jungle	Warp	
September 14	Arcane Roots	Landslide		Easy Life Records	
September 14	Bosse-de-Nage	Further Still		The Flenser	
September 14	Brant Bjork	Mankind Woman	Stoner rock, desert rock, psychedelic rock	Heavy Psych Sounds Records	
September 14	Crippled Black Phoenix	Great Escape		Season of Mist	
September 14	Carrie Underwood	Cry Pretty	Country pop, R&B	Capitol Records Nashville	
September 14	The Chills	Snow Bound	Indie pop, indie rock	Fire	
September 14	David Guetta	7	Dance, house, pop	Parlophone, Big Beat, Atlantic	
September 14	Deicide	Overtures of Blasphemy	Death metal	Century Media	
September 14	Dilly Dally	Heaven	Alternative rock, indie rock	Partisan	
September 14	The Dirty Nil	Master Volume	Punk rock, rock and roll	Dine Alone	
September 14	Emma Louise	Lilac Everything		Liberation	
September 14	Emma Ruth Rundle	On Dark Horses	Post-rock, indie rock	Sargent House	
September 14	Fit for a King	Dark Skies	Metalcore	Solid State	
September 14	Good Charlotte	Generation Rx	Pop-punk, alternative rock	MDDN, BMG	
September 14	The Goon Sax	We're Not Talking	Indie pop, rock	Chapter Music, Wichita	
September 14	Grace Petrie	Queer as Folk			
September 14	Guerilla Toss	Twisted Crystal		DFA	
September 14	Jungle	For Ever	Disco, neo soul, R&B	XL	
September 14	Low	Double Negative	Ambient, noise, electronic	Sub Pop	
September 14	Noname	Room 25	Jazz rap, neo soul		
September 14	Orbital	Monsters Exist		ACP Recordings	
September 14	Pale Waves	My Mind Makes Noises	Indie pop, synth-pop, pop	Dirty Hit, Interscope	
September 14	Paul Weller	True Meanings	Folk rock	Parlophone	
September 14	Phronesis	We Are All		Edition	
September 14	Richard Thompson	13 Rivers	Folk rock	New West, Proper	
September 14	Sarah Davachi	Gave in Rest		Ba Da Bing	
September 14	Sleaford Mods	Sleaford Mods		Rough Trade	
September 14	Slothrust	The Pact		Dangerbird	
September 14	Thrice	Palms	Post-hardcore, alternative rock, hard rock	Epitaph	
September 14	Tony Bennett and Diana Krall	Love Is Here to Stay	Jazz	Verve, Columbia	
September 14	Tori Kelly	Hiding Place	Gospel, R&B	Capitol, Schoolboy	
September 14	Wayne Shorter	Emanon	Jazz	Blue Note	
September 15	Fred Frith Trio	Closer to the Ground	Experimental, free improvisation	Intakt	
September 18	Bhad Bhabie	15	Hip-hop, trap	Atlantic	
September 18	Roc Marciano	Behold a Dark Horse	East Coast hip-hop, mafioso rap	Marci Enterprises	
September 19	MHD	19		Artside	
September 20	The Caretaker	Everywhere at the End of Time - Stage 5	Ambient, dark ambient, drone	History Always Favours the Winners	
September 21	Avenged Sevenfold	Black Reign	Heavy metal	Warner Bros.	
September 21	Beak	Beak 3		Temporary Residence Limited	
September 21	Black Honey	Black Honey	Indie rock, alternative rock	Foxfive Records	
September 21	Brockhampton	Iridescence	Hip-hop	Question Everything, RCA	
September 21	Christine and the Queens	Chris		Because Music	
September 21	The Field	Infinite Moment	Techno, ambient house	Kompakt	
September 21	Frontperson	Frontrunner	Indie pop, folk	Oscar St.	
September 21	Gazelle Twin	Pastoral	Electronic, avant-pop	Anti-Ghost Moon Ray Records	
September 21	Jim Allchin	Prime Blues	Blues rock	Sandy Key Music	
September 21	JMSN	Velvet		White Room Records	
September 21	Josh Groban	Bridges	Operatic pop, classical, classical crossover	Reprise	
September 21	Joyce Manor	Million Dollars to Kill Me	Indie rock, pop-punk, punk rock	Epitaph	
September 21	Liars	Titles With the Word Fountain		Mute	
September 21	Lonnie Holley	MITH		Jagjaguwar	
September 21	Lupe Fiasco	Drogas Wave	Hip-hop	1st & 15th, Thirty Tigers, The Orchard	
September 21	Machine Gun Kelly	Binge	Trap	Bad Boy, Interscope	
September 21	Macy Gray	Ruby	R&B	Mack Avenue	
September 21	Metric	Art of Doubt	Indie rock, new wave, synth-pop	Metric Music International	
September 21	Milo	Budding Ornithologists Are Weary of Tired Analogies		Ruby Yacht	
September 21	Mount Eerie	After	Indie folk	P.W. Elverum & Sun	
September 21	Noah Cyrus	Good Cry	R&B, pop soul, electropop	RECORDS, Columbia	
September 21	Prince	Piano and a Microphone 1983		Warner Bros.	
September 21	Slash	Living the Dream	Hard rock	Snakepit Records, Roadrunner	
September 21	St. Lucia	Hyperion		Columbia	
September 21	The Story So Far	Proper Dose	Pop-punk	Pure Noise	
September 21	Suede	The Blue Hour	Alternative rock, art rock	Warner Music UK	
September 21	Sumac	Love in Shadow	Post-metal, sludge metal	Thrill Jockey	
September 21	Therapy?	Cleave	Alternative metal	Marshall Records	
September 21	Villagers	The Art of Pretending to Swim	Indie pop, indie folk	Domino	
September 21	Voivod	The Wake	Thrash metal, progressive metal	Century Media	
September 25	Tomb Mold	Cerulean Salvation			
September 26	Kyary Pamyu Pamyu	Japamyu	J-pop, electropop, EDM	Unborde, Warner Music Japan	
September 28	Alt-J	Reduxer		Infectious, Atlantic	
September 28	All Them Witches	ATW	Psychedelic rock, blues rock	New West	
September 28	Aurora	Infections of a Different Kind (Step 1)	Pop, electropop, art pop	Decca, Glassnote	
September 28	Beartooth	Disease	Hardcore punk, metalcore, pop-punk	Red Bull, UNFD	
September 28	Cécile McLorin Salvant	The Window	Jazz	Mack Avenue	
September 28	Cher	Dancing Queen	Pop	Warner Bros.	
September 28	Chief Keef	The Cozart			
September 28	Cypress Hill	Elephants on Acid	Alternative hip-hop, hardcore hip-hop	BMG	
September 28	Eves Karydas	Summerskin	Pop rock, Alternative rock	Dew Process, Universal Music Australia	
September 28	Getter	Visceral	Experimental, bass, hip-hop	Mau5trap	
September 28	Gouge Away	Burnt Sugar	Hardcore punk, post-hardcore	Deathwish	
September 28	Hippo Campus	Bambi	Indie rock, indie pop, experimental rock	Grand Jury Music, Transgressive	
September 28	Horrendous	Idol		Season of Mist	
September 28	JK Flesh	New Horizon	Techno	Electric Deluxe	
September 28	Kodaline	Politics of Living		B-Unique, Sony Music	
September 28	Lala Lala	The Lamb		Hardly Art	
September 28	Lil Wayne	Tha Carter V	Hip-hop	Young Money, Republic, Universal	
September 28	Logic	YSIV	Hip-hop	Visionary, Def Jam	
September 28	Loretta Lynn	Wouldn't It Be Great	Country, Americana	Sony Legacy	
September 28	Marissa Nadler	For My Crimes	Indie rock, indie folk, country	Sacred Bones, Bella Union	
September 28	Moses Boyd	Displaced Diaspora		Exodus Records	
September 28	Mudhoney	Digital Garbage	Alternative rock	Sub Pop	
September 28	Nick Cave and the Bad Seeds	Distant Sky: Live in Copenhagen		Bad Seed Ltd.	
September 28	Nile Rodgers and Chic	It's About Time	R&B, disco	Virgin EMI	
September 28	Palaye Royale	Boom Boom Room (Side B)	Art rock, garage rock, glam rock	Sumerian	
September 28	Pigs Pigs Pigs Pigs Pigs Pigs Pigs	King of Cowards	Doom metal, sludge metal	Rocket Recordings	
September 28	Rod Stewart	Blood Red Roses		Republic, Decca	
September 28	Sigala	Brighter Days		Ministry of Sound, Columbia	
September 28	SOB X RBE	Gangin II		Empire	
September 28	Tim Hecker	Konoyo		Kranky	
September 28	Viagra Boys	Street Worms	Post-punk	Year0001	

== Fourth quarter ==
=== October ===
List of albums released in October 2018
Go to: January | February | March | April | May | June | July | August | September | October | November | December | Back to top
Release date	Artist	Album	Genre	Label	Ref.
October 1	Kero Kero Bonito	Time 'n' Place	Indie rock, noise, shoegaze	Polyvinyl	
October 3	Tofubeats	Run	J-pop	Unborde	
October 4	Clarence Clarity	Think: Peace	R&B, synth-pop, new wave	Deluxe Pain	
October 4	Pabllo Vittar	Não Para Não	Pop, axé, forró	Sony Music, Matadeiros	
October 5	Adrianne Lenker	Abysskiss	Folk	Saddle Creek	
October 5	Angèle	Brol		Angèle VL	
October 5	Atmosphere	Mi Vida Local		Rhymesayers	
October 5	Behemoth	I Loved You at Your Darkest	Blackened death metal	Nuclear Blast, Metal Blade, Mystic	
October 5	Black Peaks	All That Divides		Rise	
October 5	Cat Power	Wanderer	Country blues	Domino	
October 5	Coheed and Cambria	Vaxis – Act I: The Unheavenly Creatures	Progressive rock	Roadrunner	
October 5	Cursive	Vitriola	Emo, indie rock, post-hardcore	15 Passenger, Big Scary Monsters	
October 5	Echo & the Bunnymen	The Stars, the Oceans & the Moon	Alternative rock	BMG	
October 5	Eric Church	Desperate Man	Outlaw country	EMI Nashville, Snakefarm	
October 5	Estrons	You Say I'm Too Much, I Say You're Not Enough	Alternative rock, punk rock, post-punk	Gofod, Roll Call, The Orchard	
October 5	For King & Country	Burn the Ships	Contemporary Christian	Word	
October 5	Fucked Up	Dose Your Dreams		Merge	
October 5	Gunship	Dark All Day		Horsie in the Hedge	
October 5	High on Fire	Electric Messiah	Stoner metal, sludge metal, thrash metal	eOne	
October 5	Ice Nine Kills	The Silver Scream	Metalcore, heavy metal, post-hardcore	Fearless	
October 5	KT Tunstall	Wax	Pop rock, indie rock	Virgin, Rostrum	
October 5	Lady Gaga and Bradley Cooper	A Star Is Born	Country, rock, pop	Interscope	
October 5	LANY	Malibu Nights	Pop, soft rock, R&B	Side Street, Polydor	
October 5	Last Dinosaurs	Yumeno Garden	Indie rock, dance-punk, synth-pop	Dew Process, Universal Music Australia	
October 5	Lil Baby and Gunna	Drip Harder	Hip-hop, trap	YSL, Quality Control, Motown	
October 5	Little Big	Antipositive, Pt. 2	Rave, pop, happy hardcore	Little Big Family, Warner Music Russia	
October 5	Marie Davidson	Working Class Woman	Electronic, techno, house	Ninja Tune	
October 5	Mario	Dancing Shadows		New Citizen, Empire	
October 5	MewithoutYou	Untitled	Indie rock, post-hardcore, art rock	Run for Cover, Big Scary Monsters	
October 5	Molly Burch	First Flower	Indie pop, indie rock, country	Captured Tracks	
October 5	Monuments	Phronesis	Progressive metal, djent	Century Media	
October 5	Petite Noir	La Maison Noir / The Black House		Roya Records	
October 5	Phosphorescent	C'est La Vie	Indie rock, indie pop, indie folk	Dead Oceans	
October 5	Poets of the Fall	Ultraviolet	Alternative rock	Insomniac	
October 5	Ron Gallo	Stardust Birthday Party		New West	
October 5	Shaboozey	Lady Wrangler		Republic	
October 5	Sheck Wes	Mudboy	Hip-hop, trap, punk rap	Cactus Jack, GOOD Music, Interscope	
October 5	T.I.	Dime Trap	Hip-hop, trap	Grand Hustle, Epic	
October 5	Tokyo Police Club	TPC	Indie rock	Dine Alone	
October 5	Twenty One Pilots	Trench	Alternative hip-hop, alternative rock, electronic rock	Fueled by Ramen	
October 5	We Are the City	At Night		Light Organ	
October 5	Windhand	Eternal Return	Doom metal	Relapse	
October 5	You Me at Six	VI	Pop, rock	Underground Records, AWAL	
October 10	Ghostemane	N/O/I/S/E			
October 11	Edie Brickell & New Bohemians	Rocket	Rock	Verve Forecast	
October 12	Ambrose Akinmusire	Origami Harvest	Jazz, avant-garde	Blue Note	
October 12	Atreyu	In Our Wake	Alternative metal, melodic metalcore	Spinefarm	
October 12	Basement	Beside Myself	Alternative rock, emo	Fueled by Ramen	
October 12	Belly	Immigrant		Roc Nation, XO	
October 12	Beyond Creation	Algorythm		Season of Mist	
October 12	Carmouflage Rose	Taste		Carmouflage Rose, Sony Music Australia	
October 12	Colter Wall	Songs of the Plains	Americana, folk, country	Thirty Tigers	
October 12	Ella Mai	Ella Mai	R&B	10 Summers, Interscope	
October 12	Elvis Costello and the Imposters	Look Now		Concord	
October 12	Eric Clapton	Happy Xmas	Christmas, blues rock	Brushbranch/Surfdog	
October 12	Jess Glynne	Always In Between	Pop, dance-pop, R&B	Atlantic	
October 12	John Grant	Love Is Magic	Synth-pop	Bella Union	
October 12	Kurt Vile	Bottle It In	Indie rock	Matador	
October 12	Matthew Dear	Bunny		Ghostly International	
October 12	Morgan Evans	Things That We Drink To	Country	Warner Music Nashville	
October 12	Odunsi the Engine	Rare			
October 12	Paul Kelly	Nature		EMI Music Australia	
October 12	Polyphia	New Levels New Devils		Equal Vision	
October 12	Quavo	Quavo Huncho	Trap	Capitol, Motown, Quality Control	
October 12	Sister Sparrow	Gold	Soul, rock	Thirty Tigers	
October 12	Tom Morello	The Atlas Underground		Mom + Pop	
October 12	Le Trio Joubran	The Long March		Cooking Vinyl	
October 12	Usher and Zaytoven	A	R&B, trap	Brand Usher, RCA	
October 12	WSTRN	Dou3le 3ak		Atlantic	
October 12	Young the Giant	Mirror Master	Indie rock	Elektra	
October 12	Yowler	Black Dog in My Path		Double Double Whammy	
October 13	Current 93	The Light Is Leaving Us All		The Spheres, House of Mythology	
October 15	DJ Muggs and Roc Marciano	Kaos	East Coast hip-hop		
October 17	Lil B	Options			
October 19	Ace Frehley	Spaceman	Hard rock	Entertainment One Music	
October 19	Cloud Nothings	Last Building Burning	Indie rock, emo, noise rock	Carpark, Wichita	
October 19	Disturbed	Evolution	Hard rock, alternative metal	Reprise	
October 19	Elle King	Shake the Spirit	Blues rock, Americana, alternative country	RCA	
October 19	Empress Of	Us		Terrible, XL	
October 19	Esperanza Spalding	12 Little Spells	Jazz	Concord	
October 19	Greta Van Fleet	Anthem of the Peaceful Army	Hard rock, blues rock	Republic	
October 19	Hatesphere	Reduced to Flesh	Thrash metal, melodic death metal	Scarlet	
October 19	How to Dress Well	The Anteroom	Experimental pop, Electronic, R&B	Domino	
October 19	Juice Wrld and Future	Wrld on Drugs	Hip-hop, trap	Epic	
October 19	Keith Jarrett	La Fenice	Jazz	ECM	
October 19	Khalid	Suncity	R&B	RCA	
October 19	King Crimson	Meltdown: Live in Mexico City	Progressive rock	Discipline Global Mobile	
October 19	Lil Yachty	Nuthin' 2 Prove	Hip-hop, trap, pop	Capitol, Motown, Quality Control	
October 19	MØ	Forever Neverland	Pop	Columbia	
October 19	Neneh Cherry	Broken Politics	Trip hop, soul, experimental	Smalltown Supersound	
October 19	Nothing but Thieves	What Did You Think When You Made Me This Way?	Alternative rock, stoner rock, hard rock	RCA	
October 19	Novo Amor	Birthplace		All Points	
October 19	Open Mike Eagle	What Happens When I Try to Relax	Indie rap		
October 19	R.E.M.	R.E.M. at the BBC	Alternative rock	Craft	
October 19	Richard Ashcroft	Natural Rebel	Alternative rock, pop rock	BMG, Righteous Phonographic Association	
October 19	Rüfüs Du Sol	Solace	Alternative dance	Rüfüs Du Sol	
October 19	Saliva	10 Lives		Megaforce	
October 19	Smoke Boys	Don't Panic II			
October 19	Soulfly	Ritual	Thrash metal, groove metal, death metal	Nuclear Blast	
October 22	Normani and Calvin Harris	Normani x Calvin Harris	R&B, club	RCA	
October 24	Yoko Ono	Warzone	Rock, pop	Sony Music	
October 26	Allie X	Super Sunset	Synthwave, dance-pop, electropop	Twin Music	
October 26	Andrea Bocelli	Sì		Sugar	
October 26	Baxter Dury, Étienne de Crécy, and Delilah Holliday	B.E.D	Electronic	Heavenly, PIAS Le Label	
October 26	Black Eyed Peas	Masters of the Sun Vol. 1	Political hip-hop	Interscope	
October 26	Bloodbath	The Arrow of Satan Is Drawn	Blackened death metal	Peaceville	
October 26	Boygenius	Boygenius	Rock, folk rock	Matador	
October 26	Boy George and Culture Club	Life	Indie rock, reggae, soul	BMG	
October 26	Charlie Haden and Brad Mehldau	Long Ago and Far Away		Impulse!	
October 26	Christian McBride	Christian McBride's New Jawn	Jazz	Mack Avenue	
October 26	Daughters	You Won't Get What You Want	Noise rock, no wave, industrial rock	Ipecac	
October 26	David Crosby, Michael League, Becca Stevens, and Michelle Willis	Here If You Listen	Pop rock, folk, jazz	BMG	
October 26	Elisa	Diari aperti	Pop	Universal Music Italia	
October 26	Gang of Youths	MTV Unplugged (Live in Melbourne)		Mosy Recordings, Sony Music Australia	
October 26	Gaye Su Akyol	İstikrarlı Hayal Hakikattir		Glitterbeat Records	
October 26	Georgia Anne Muldrow	Overload	R&B, pop	Brainfeeder	
October 26	Haken	Vector	Progressive metal, progressive rock	Inside Out	
October 26	Homeboy Sandman and Edan	Humble Pi	Alternative hip-hop	Stones Throw	
October 26	Ingrid Michaelson	Songs for the Season		Cabin 24 Records, Mom + Pop	
October 26	Jessie J	This Christmas Day	Christmas	Republic	
October 26	John Legend	A Legendary Christmas	Christmas	Columbia	
October 26	Joji	Ballads 1	Pop, R&B	88rising, 12Tone	
October 26	Julia Holter	Aviary	Experimental pop	Domino	
October 26	KMFDM	Live in the USSA		earMUSIC	
October 26	Lukas Graham	3 (The Purple Album)		Copenhagen, Then We Take the World, Warner Bros.	
October 26	Makaya McCraven	Universal Beings	Jazz	International Anthem	
October 26	Måneskin	Il ballo della vita	Alternative rock	Sony Music, RCA	
October 26	Mick Jenkins	Pieces of a Man	Alternative hip-hop, conscious hip-hop, spoken word	Free Nation, Cinematic	
October 26	MihTy	MihTy	R&B, hip-hop	Def Jam, Atlantic	
October 26	Miya Folick	Premonitions	Pop	Interscope, Terrible	
October 26	Nao	Saturn	R&B, jazz	Little Tokyo, Sony Music, RCA	
October 26	Nicole Dollanganger	Heart Shaped Bed		Crystal Math, Eerie Organization	
October 26	Pentatonix	Christmas Is Here!	Christmas, A cappella	RCA	
October 26	Ray BLK	Empress		Island	
October 26	Robyn	Honey	Electropop, post-disco, dance-pop	Konichiwa, Interscope	
October 26	Say Lou Lou	Immortelle		á Deux, Cosmos Music	
October 26	Shad	A Short Story About a War	Canadian hip-hop, alternative hip-hop, jazz rap	Secret City	
October 26	Soap&Skin	From Gas to Solid / You Are My Friend		PIAS	
October 26	SRSQ	Unreality	Ethereal dark wave	Dais	
October 26	Stand Atlantic	Skinny Dipping		Hopeless	
October 26	The Struts	Young & Dangerous	Glam rock, hard rock	Interscope	
October 26	Thom Yorke	Suspiria		XL	
October 26	Tory Lanez	Love Me Now?	R&B, trap	Mad Love, Interscope	
October 26	Unknown Mortal Orchestra	IC-01 Hanoi	Experimental jazz, psychedelic rock	Jagjaguwar	
October 26	Vera Blue	Lady Powers Live at the Forum		Universal Music Australia	
October 31	Currensy, Freddie Gibbs, the Alchemist	Fetti	Hip-hop	Jet Life, ESGN, ALC, Empire	
October 31	Chief Keef	Back from the Dead 3			
October 31	Poppy	Am I a Girl?	Synth-pop, dance-pop, electropop	I'm Poppy, Mad Decent	

=== November ===
List of albums released in November 2018
Go to: January | February | March | April | May | June | July | August | September | October | November | December | Back to top
Release date	Artist	Album	Genre	Label	Ref.
November 1	Action Bronson	White Bronco	Hip-hop	Empire	
November 1	Sun Kil Moon	This Is My Dinner		Caldo Verde	
November 2	Andrew Cyrille	Lebroba	Jazz	ECM	
November 2	Arsis	Visitant		Nuclear Blast, Agonia	
November 2	Barbra Streisand	Walls	Pop	Columbia	
November 2	Bill Ryder-Jones	Yawn		Domino	
November 2	David Archuleta	Winter in the Air	Christmas	Shadow Mountain	
November 2	Dead Can Dance	Dionysus	World music, worldbeat, neoclassical dark wave	PIAS	
November 2	Drug Church	Cheer	Post-hardcore, hardcore punk, alternative rock	Pure Noise	
November 2	H.E.R.	I Used to Know Her: Part 2		RCA	
November 2	Hollywood Undead	Psalms			
November 2	Kelly Moran	Ultraviolet	Contemporary classical, electronic, experimental	Warp	
November 2	Maisie Peters	Dressed Too Nice for a Jacket	Folk-pop	Atlantic	
November 2	Marianne Faithfull	Negative Capability	Rock, folk		
November 2	Metro Boomin	Not All Heroes Wear Capes	Trap	Boominati, Republic	
November 2	Molly Nilsson	2020	Synth-pop	Dark Skies Association, Night School Records	
November 2	Moneybagg Yo	Reset	Hip-hop, Memphis rap	CMG, N-Less Entertainment, Interscope	
November 2	Mulamba	Mulamba	Rock music, MPB	Máquina Discos	
November 2	The Ocean	Phanerozoic I: Palaeozoic	Progressive metal, post-metal, sludge metal	Metal Blade	
November 2	Opeth	Garden of the Titans: Live at Red Rocks Amphitheater	Progressive death metal, progressive rock	Moderbolaget, Nuclear Blast,	
November 2	Pistol Annies	Interstate Gospel	Country, Americana	RCA Nashville	
November 2	The Prodigy	No Tourists	Big beat	Take Me to the Hospital, BMG	
November 2	Rosalía	El mal querer	New flamenco, experimental pop, Latin R&B	Columbia	
November 2	Rosanne Cash	She Remembers Everything	Americana, country folk	Blue Note	
November 2	Samantha Jade	The Magic of Christmas	Christmas	Sony Music Australia	
November 2	Sick of It All	Wake the Sleeping Dragon!	Hardcore punk	Fat, Century Media	
November 2	Takeoff	The Last Rocket	Trap	Capitol, Motown, Quality Control	
November 2	Tenacious D	Post-Apocalypto		Columbia	
November 2	Vince Staples	FM!	Hip-hop	Blacksmith, Def Jam	
November 2	Yung Lean	Poison Ivy		Year0001	
November 5	Twice	Yes or Yes	K-pop, dance-pop	JYP, Republic	
November 8	Smino	Noir	Hip-hop, neo soul, electro-funk	Zero Fatigue, Downtown, Interscope	
November 9	Alex Henry Foster	Windows in the Sky		Hopeful Tragedy, Sony Music, The Orchard	
November 9	Architects	Holy Hell	Progressive metalcore	Epitaph, UNFD	
November 9	Charles Bradley	Black Velvet	Soul	Daptone, Dunham	
November 9	Crowder	I Know a Ghost	CCM	Sixstepsrecords, Sparrow	
November 9	Cult Leader	A Patient Man	Metalcore, sludge metal	Deathwish	
November 9	Cupcakke	Eden	Hip-hop		
November 9	Gabe Lopez	God Bless the Queens		Spectra Music Group	
November 9	IDK	IDK & Friends :)			
November 9	I Dont Know How but They Found Me	1981 Extended Play	Indie pop, new wave, alternative rock	Fearless	
November 9	Imagine Dragons	Origins	Pop, pop rock	Kidinakorner, Polydor, Interscope	
November 9	J Mascis	Elastic Days		Sub Pop	
November 9	Jon Bellion	Glory Sound Prep	Pop, R&B	Visionary, Capitol	
November 9	Jonas Blue	Blue	Dance	Positiva, Virgin EMI	
November 9	Larkin Poe	Venom & Faith			
November 9	Laura Jane Grace and the Devouring Mothers	Bought to Rot	Punk rock, indie rock, heartland rock	Bloodshot, Red Scare	
November 9	Lil Durk	Signed to the Streets 3	Hip-hop, drill	Only the Family, Alamo, Interscope	
November 9	Lil Peep	Come Over When You're Sober, Pt. 2	Emo rap, pop-punk	AUTNMY, Columbia	
November 9	Little Dragon	Lover Chanting		Ninja Tune	
November 9	Muse	Simulation Theory	Electronic rock, pop rock, synth-pop	Warner Bros.	
November 9	Olly Murs	You Know I Know		RCA, Sony Music	
November 9	Phish	Kasvot Växt: í rokk	Progressive rock	JEMP	
November 9	Planningtorock	Powerhouse		DFA	
November 9	Sabrina Carpenter	Singular: Act I	Dance-pop	Hollywood	
November 9	Sarah Brightman	Hymn		Decca	
November 9	Steven Lee Olsen	Timing Is Everything	Country	SLO Circus	
November 9	Ted Nugent	The Music Made Me Do It	Rhythm and blues, rock and roll	Round Hill 19	
November 9	Tee Grizzley	Still My Moment	Hip-hop, trap	300	
November 9	Trippie Redd	A Love Letter to You 3	Emo rap	10K, Caroline	
November 9	Various artists	Dr. Seuss' The Grinch: Original Motion Picture Soundtrack	Hip-hop, rock, Christmas	Columbia	
November 9	Various artists	Songs That Saved My Life	Alternative rock post-hardcore, pop-punk	Hopeless, Sub City	
November 9	Ziggy Alberts	Laps Around the Sun		CommonFolk Records	
November 16	Anderson Paak	Oxnard	Funk, soul, hip-hop	Aftermath, 12Tone, ADA	
November 16	Boyzone	Thank You & Goodnight	Pop	Warner Music	
November 16	Conan Gray	Sunset Season	Indie pop, indie rock, synth-pop	Republic	
November 16	Giorgia	Pop Heart	Pop	Microphonica, Sony Music	
November 16	The Good, the Bad & the Queen	Merrie Land	Folk, rock, dub	Studio 13	
November 16	Hen Ogledd	Mogic		Domino	
November 16	Karise Eden	Born to Fight		Island Australia, Universal	
November 16	Lil Gotit	Hood Baby	Hip-hop	Alamo Records	
November 16	Little Mix	LM5	Pop, hip-hop, R&B	RCA UK, Columbia	
November 16	Mariah Carey	Caution	Pop, R&B, hip-hop	Epic	
November 16	Mark Knopfler	Down the Road Wherever		British Grove, Universal, Virgin EMI	
November 16	Michael Bublé	Love	Vocal jazz, traditional pop	Reprise	
November 16	Mumford & Sons	Delta	Folk rock, electronic rock, alternative rock	Gentlemen of the Road, Island, Glassnote	
November 16	P.O.D.	Circles	Hard rock, nu metal	Mascot	
November 16	Ryley Walker	The Lillywhite Sessions	Folk	Dead Oceans	
November 16	The Smashing Pumpkins	Shiny and Oh So Bright, Vol. 1 / LP: No Past. No Future. No Sun.	Hard rock	Napalm	
November 16	Tyler, the Creator	Music Inspired by Illumination & Dr. Seuss' The Grinch	Christmas	Columbia	
November 17	Jaden Smith	The Sunset Tapes: A Cool Tape Story		MSFTSMusicRoc, Roc Nation, Interscope	
November 21	Alexandros	Sleepless in Brooklyn	Alternative rock, pop-punk, pop rock	Universal Japan, RX-Records	
November 23	Art Brut	Wham! Bang! Pow! Let's Rock Out!		Alcopop!	
November 23	Christoph de Babalon	Exquisite Angst		A Colourful Storm	
November 23	Eros Ramazzotti	Vita ce n'è		Polydor	
November 23	In the Woods...	Cease the Day	Progressive metal, doom metal, gothic metal	Debemur Morti Productions	
November 23	Laibach	The Sound of Music	Electronic	Mute	
November 23	Rita Ora	Phoenix	Dance-pop, pop, R&B	Atlantic	
November 23	Unearth	Extinction(s)	Metalcore	Century Media	
November 26	Black Thought	Streams of Thought, Vol. 2	Hip-hop	Human Re Sources, Passyunk	
November 26	JID	DiCaprio 2	Hip-hop	Dreamville, Interscope, Spillage Village	
November 26	Posthuman	Mutant City Acid		Balkan Vinyl	
November 27	6ix9ine	Dummy Boy	Hip-hop	Scumgang, 10K, Create	
November 30	The 1975	A Brief Inquiry into Online Relationships	Pop, rock, electropop	Dirty Hit, Polydor	
November 30	Alessia Cara	The Pains of Growing	Pop, R&B	Def Jam	
November 30	Beth Hart	Live at the Royal Albert Hall	Rock, jazz, blues	Provogue	
November 30	Bryan Ferry and His Orchestra	Bitter-Sweet		BMG	
November 30	Clean Bandit	What Is Love?	EDM, pop, R&B	Atlantic	
November 30	Dolly Parton	Dumplin'	Country	Dolly Records, RCA	
November 30	Earl Sweatshirt	Some Rap Songs	Hip-hop	Tan Cressida Records, Columbia	
November 30	Foxwarren	Foxwarren		Anti-, Arts & Crafts	
November 30	Ho99o9	Cyber Cop [Unauthorized MP3.]			
November 30	Jeff Tweedy	Warm		dBpm	
November 30	Lil Baby	Street Gossip	Hip-hop	Quality Control, Motown, Capitol	
November 30	Mae	Multisensory Aesthetic Experience		Tooth & Nail	
November 30	Marco Mengoni	Atlantico		Sony Music Italy	
November 30	Meek Mill	Championships	Hip-hop	Atlantic, Maybach Music	
November 30	Mel Parsons	Glass Heart	Indie folk, Americana	Cape Road Recordings, Native Tongue Music	
November 30	Ski Mask the Slump God	Stokeley		Victor Victor, Republic	
November 30	Tommy Cash	¥€$		PC Music	

=== December ===
List of albums released in December 2018
Go to: January | February | March | April | May | June | July | August | September | October | November | December | Back to top
Release date	Artist	Album	Genre	Label	Ref.
December 5	Chick Corea	Trilogy 2	Jazz	UMG, Concord	
December 5	Lovebites	Clockwork Immortality	Power metal	Victor	
December 7	Gucci Mane	Evil Genius	Hip-hop, trap	GUWOP Enterprises, Atlantic	
December 7	Ice Cube	Everythang's Corrupt	Hip-hop	Lench Mob, Interscope	
December 7	Kollegah	Monument	Jazz	Alpha Music Group, Warner	
December 7	LP	Heart to Mouth	Pop rock	BMG, Vagrant	
December 7	Metal Church	Damned If You Do	Heavy metal, thrash metal	Rat Pak Records, Nuclear Blast, King	
December 7	Van Morrison	The Prophet Speaks	Jazz	Exile Productions, Caroline	
December 7	Vulfpeck	Hill Climber		Vulf Records	
December 7	XXXTentacion	Skins	Hip-hop, trap, emo rap	Bad Vibes Forever, Empire	
December 12	Infected Mushroom	Head of NASA and the 2 Amish Boys	Psychedelic trance	Monstercat	
December 14	Alan Walker	Different World	Electro house, progressive house	MER, Sony Music	
December 14	Bruce Springsteen	Springsteen on Broadway	Acoustic rock	Columbia	
December 14	The Chainsmokers	Sick Boy	EDM, future bass, trap	Disruptor, Columbia	
December 14	Kodak Black	Dying to Live		Atlantic	
December 14	Method Man	Meth Lab Season 2: The Lithium	Hip-hop	Hanz On Music Entertainment	
December 14	Mitchell Tenpenny	Telling All My Secrets	Country pop	Columbia Nashville, Riser House Records	
December 14	Sjava	Umqhele	Afro-pop, trap, R&B	Ambitiouz Entertainment	
December 14	Various artists	Aquaman		WaterTower	
December 14	Zayn	Icarus Falls	Pop, R&B	RCA	
December 20	Trisha Yearwood	Let's Be Frank	Jazz	Gwendolyn Records	
December 21	21 Savage	I Am > I Was	Hip-hop	Epic, Slaughter Gang	
December 21	A Boogie wit da Hoodie	Hoodie SZN	Trap	High Bridge, Atlantic	
December 21	Reel Big Fish	Life Sucks...Let's Dance!	Ska punk	Rock Ridge	
December 24	Bad Bunny	X 100pre	Latin hip-hop, Latin trap, reggaeton	Rimas	
December 25	Waka Flocka Flame	I Can't Rap Vol. 2			
December 26	Jolin Tsai	Ugly Beauty	Pop	Sony Music	
