= You, Whom I Have Always Hated =

Studio album by the Body and Thou
- Released: January 27, 2015
- Genre: Sludge metal; doom metal
- Length: 27:42
- Label: Thrill Jockey

The Body chronology
Released from Love (2014)	You, Whom I Have Always Hated (2015)	xoroAHbin (2015)

Thou chronology
The Sacrifice (2014)	You, Whom I Have Always Hated (2015)	You Only Deserve Conceit (2015)

You, Whom I Have Always Hated is a collaborative album by American sludge metal bands the Body and Thou. Released on January 27, 2015 through Thrill Jockey record label, the album was included on the reissue of bands' first collaborative effort, Released from Love EP (2014).

== Critical reception ==
Professional ratings
Aggregate scores
Source	Rating
Metacritic	78/100
Review scores
Source	Rating
AllMusic	4/5 stars
Pitchfork	7.6/10
PopMatters	9/10
Spin	8/10
Tiny Mix Tapes	3/5 stars

Upon its release, You, Whom I Have Always Hated received positive reviews from music critics. At Metacritic, which assigns a normalized rating out of 100 to reviews from critics, the album received an average score of 78, which indicates "generally favorable reviews", based on 10 reviews. Allmusic critic Fred Thomas wrote: "The crushing intensity on this collection is commonplace for both bands, but comes together with more swampy layers than either can muster on their own." Pitchfork stated: "Though it shows signs of both responsible parties, it also proves their inherent restlessness, as they’re both willing to bend toward one another to create something richer than they might have rendered themselves." PopMatters's Austin Price described the record as "a monolithic album, so massive and so black and often so much of a piece that to try to take it in at a glance or to distinguish certain elements seems either imposing or impossible."

The Quietus' Dean Brown thought that the release "highlights the bleak force that these bands can channel and how impactful it is when united as one." Kelly Kim of Spin praised the album, stating: "Every note sounds instinctual, every moment fluid; this is what happens when good friends come together to watch the world burn." Nevertheless, Tiny Mix Tapes was more mixed in their review of the album, describing it as "a fucking heavy record, an absolute destroyer in fact." They added: "With thunderous riffs and gargantuan bass lines that come wrapped in noise and effects, the album certainly has moments of genuine terror."

== Track listing ==
1. "Her Strongholds Unvanquishable" – 7:22
2. "The Devils of Trust Steal the Souls of the Free" – 2:08
3. "Terrible Lie" (Nine Inch Nails cover) – 4:11
4. "Beyond the Realms Of Dream, That Fleeting Shade Under the Corpus of Vanity" – 5:11
5. "He Returns to the Place of His Iniquity" – 2:15
6. "Lurking Fear" – 6:35

== Personnel ==
The Body

- Chip King – guitars, vocals
- Lee Buford – drums, programming

Thou

- Bryan Funck – vocals
- Andy Gibbs – guitar
- Matthew Thudium – guitar
- Mitch Wells – bass guitar
- Josh Nee – drums

Other personnel

- Keith Souza – recording, additional percussion
- Seth Manchester – recording, additional percussion
- Chrissy Wolpert – additional vocals
- Reba Mitchell – additional vocals
