= Rhea Sylvia (EP) =

EP by Thou
- Released: July 27, 2018
- Recorded: 2017
- Studio: Hightower Studios
- Length: 30:36
- Label: Deathwish (DW203)
- Producer: James Whitten

Thou chronology
Inconsolable (2018)	Rhea Sylvia (2018)	Magus (2018)

Alternative cover art

Rhea Sylvia is an extended play (EP) by the American metal band Thou. It was released on July 27, 2018 through the independent hardcore punk label Deathwish Inc. Except for the cover of "The Lasting Dose", (from sludge metal band Crowbar's 2001 album Sonic Excess in Its Purest Form) the songs on Rhea Sylvia are Thou versions of band member Matthew Thudium's solo material. The EP's musical style is a mix of the band's signature sludge metal sound and grunge artists such as Alice in Chains.

== Background and recording ==
Rhea Sylvia one release in a four-part recording project. Leading up to the release of Thou's 2018 fifth studio album, Magus—their first full-length studio album since 2014's Heathen—the band decided to release three EPs, each with its own sonic theme and released through a different label. In May 2018, Thou released the drone music EP, The House Primordial, through the label Raw Sugar; followed the acoustic EP, Inconsolable, released through Community Records in June 2018; followed by the grunge music EP Rhea Sylvia in July 2018; and ultimately released the studio album Magus through Sacred Bones Records in August 2018, which is said to incorporate elements from all three EPs. Throughout Thou's history, the band has been noted for releasing EPs, split albums and collaborative albums around the release of major solo studio albums.

Work for all four related 2018 releases began in 2015 and were all released with minimal promotion. According to the band, the nature of the surprise release caused some fans to believe all releases were written and recorded fairly quickly. When in fact, Rhea Sylvia was recorded in secret about a year prior to its official release.

== Release and promotion ==
Rhea Sylvia was released on July 27, 2018. Digital and 12" vinyl copies were released through Deathwish Inc., and some digital copies were sold with alternate cover art. A CD-format compilation album title Ceremonies of Consolidation released through Gilead Media will include all three pre-Magus EPs (The House Primordial, Inconsolable and Rhea Sylvia).

Thou promoted the release of Rhea Sylvia with an online stream of "The Only Law" on May 31, 2018. Lars Gotrich of NPR said, when compared to the material of the other two related EPs, (The House Primordial and Inconsolable) the track "sounds like the most natural extension of Thou's sound, but more refined." Revolver described the track as, "part industrial, part goth, part black metal, part sludge, all Thou." Two days before the release of Rhea Sylvia, Thou released the EP's closing track, a cover of Crowbar's "The "Lasting Dose". Revolver described the track as "particularly filthy [and] feedback-ridden" while MetalSucks said it "pays due homage to their fellow Louisana [sic] doom brethren while still holding up as an incredible track in its own right."

== Reception ==
Professional ratings
Review scores
Source	Rating
Allmusic	3.5/5 stars
Metal Injection	8/10

Rhea Sylvia was generally well received by music critics. Several critics lauded Thou's incorporation of grunge music into their sound, Bryan Funck's vocal range, and the band's sonic experimentation that diversifies their existing and expansive discography. In Paul Simon's review for Allmusic, he concluded: "Rhea Sylvia is one of Thou's more accessible offerings, but it's no less boundary-pushing, and it makes a welcome, fitting addition to the group's catalog." In Kevin Stewart-Panko's review for Metal Injection, he said: "In lieu of a proper grunge revival—which will likely, or hopefully, never happens—Rhea Sylvia offers not only an expansion of the blueprint but also shows just how deep Thou’s capacity for diversity runs."

== Track listing ==
1. "The Only Law" – 4:43
2. "Unfortunate Times" – 7:56
3. "Non-Entity" – 3:50
4. "Deepest Sun" – 3:50
5. "Restless River" – 4:34"
6. "The Lasting Dose" (originally written and performed by Crowbar) – 5:43
