= Umbilical (Thou album) =

Studio album by Thou
- Released: May 31, 2024
- Recorded: December 2023
- Studio: Hightower (New Orleans, Louisiana)
- Genre: Sludge metal; doom metal
- Length: 48:46
- Label: Sacred Bones
- Producer: Thou

Thou chronology
Myopia (2022)	Umbilical (2024)

Alternate cover art

Umbilical is the sixth studio album by American sludge metal band Thou, released on May 31, 2024, through Sacred Bones Records. Recording sessions took place in December 2023 at Hightower Recording in New Orleans.

== Critical reception ==
Professional ratings
Aggregate scores
Source	Rating
Metacritic	87/100
Review scores
Source	Rating
AllMusic	4/5 stars
Beats Per Minute	78%
Distorted Sound	10/10
The Guardian	5/5 stars
Kerrang!	4/5
Louder Than War	4.5/5
Pitchfork	7.9/10
Sputnikmusic	4/5

Umbilical was met with positive reviews from music critics. According to the review aggregator Metacritic, Umbilical received "universal acclaim" based on a weighted average score of 87 out of 100 from 7 critic scores.

Harry Sword of The Guardian praised the album, saying "what results is the most maximalist and invigoratingly cathartic exercise in introspection you could possibly imagine – and one of the finest metal albums of the past decade". Olly Thomas of Kerrang! resumed: "this is simultaneously both the most pulverising and the most memorable release the band have put their name to in years". Sputnikmusic staff Sunnyvale concluded: "Umbilical unleashes a different side of the band's signature blend of bone-crunching riffs and ear-splitting screeching, but it's characteristically well-crafted and certain to satisfy music fans previously seduced by Thou's grim and imposing style". Patrick Lyons of Pitchfork stated: "Thou are a blast even when Funck is digging into esoteric philosophy over the slowest riff you've ever heard, but it's refreshing to hear them get real with themselves, jogging their music out of the enthralling but insular world they've created over the past 15-plus years". John Amen of Beats Per Minute concluded, "with Umbilical, Thou toe the doom-metal line re the inevitability of suffering/the urgent need for defiance while rummaging in an expanded playbook. The band flirt with songs and song structures, writhing, per usual, in a hellish din, Bryan Funck exuding immeasurable discontent".

Reviewing the album for AllMusic. Fred Thomas called it, "a nightmarish depiction of destroyed emotions and blind rage, its combination of production subtleties and light nods to '90s influences" and claimed that the band "peel away just enough intensity to make the album Thou's most coherent and engaging work yet."

== Track listing ==
Umbilical track listing
No.	Title	Length
1.	"Narcissist's Prayer"	6:12
2.	"Emotional Terrorist"	4:07
3.	"Lonely Vigil"	3:04
4.	"House of Ideas"	6:43
5.	"I Feel Nothing When You Cry"	3:52
6.	"Unbidden Guest"	3:43
7.	"I Return as Chained and Bound to You"	6:38
8.	"The Promise"	4:30
9.	"Panic Stricken, I Flee"	4:39
10.	"Siege Perilous"	5:18
Total length:		48:46

== Personnel ==
Thou

- Andy Gibbs – guitar, production
- Matthew Thudium – guitar, production
- Benjamin Wells – bass, production
- Tyler Coburn – drums, production
- KC Stafford – guitar, vocals, production
- Bryan Funck – vocals, production

Additional contributors

- James Plotkin – mastering
- James Whiten – mixing, recording
- Rob Lovell – mixing assistance, recording assistance
- Mercy Correll – design, layout
- Derek Zimmer – additional vocals on "Narcissist's Prayer"
- Michael Berdan – additional vocals on "House of Ideas"
- Emily McWilliams – additional vocals on "The Promise" and "Panic Stricken, I Flee"

== Charts ==
Chart performance for Umbilical
Chart (2024)	Peak position
UK Album Downloads (OCC)	34
UK Independent Albums (OCC)	32
UK Rock & Metal Albums (OCC)	12
