= May Our Chambers Be Full =

Studio album by Emma Ruth Rundle and Thou
- Released: October 30, 2020
- Recorded: August 2019
- Studio: Hightower Studios (New Orleans, LA)
- Genre: Sludge metal, doom metal
- Length: 36:12
- Label: Sacred Bones

Emma Ruth Rundle chronology
On Dark Horses (2018)	May Our Chambers Be Full (2020)	Engine of Hell (2021)

Thou chronology
Magus (2018)	May Our Chambers Be Full (2020)	Umbilical (2024)

May Our Chambers Be Full is a collaborative studio album by American singer-songwriter Emma Ruth Rundle and sludge metal band Thou. It was released on October 30, 2020, through Sacred Bones Records as a part of the label's 'Alliance Series'.

The collaboration was brought together by the Dutch experimental music Roadburn Festival, and the album's material was first performed there in April 2019. Recording sessions took place in August 2019 at Hightower Studios in New Orleans. In January 2021, a companion EP named The Helm of Sorrow was released.

== Background ==
The Roadburn Festival in Tilburg, Netherlands named Thou its "artist in residence" for the 2019 edition, with four separate sets scheduled across the four days of the festival. One of the sets was a collaboration with the singer-songwriter Emma Ruth Rundle, at the suggestion of festival artistic director Walter Hoeijmakers. The collaboration was debuted at the festival on April 12, 2019, and the album was recorded in New Orleans in August 2019.

Rundle praised Roadburn for highlighting metal without "the toxic masculinity aspects", while Thou guitarist Andy Gibbs said, "Aggressiveness pointed in the wrong direction is something that I hate, and something that Roadburn doesn’t usually have. Even people that don’t like metal could go to Roadburn and see some bands, meet some other people, and wouldn’t think it was just a bunch of dude idiots getting drunk."

=== The Helm of Sorrow ===
The Helm of Sorrow is the companion extended play included on 'diehard' edition to May Our Chambers Be Full. It was recorded during the same 2019 sessions that yielded the album, and it includes the project's cover of The Cranberries' "Hollywood". It was officially released on January 15, 2021, via Sacred Bones Records.

== Critical reception ==
Professional ratings
Aggregate scores
Source	Rating
AnyDecentMusic?	7.8/10
Metacritic	85/100
Review scores
Source	Rating
AllMusic	4/5 stars
The Arts Desk	4/5 stars
Beats Per Minute	78%
Kerrang!	5/5
Loud and Quiet	8/10
Metal Hammer	4/5 stars
musicOMH	4.5/5 stars
Pitchfork	6.9/10
Spectrum Culture	3.5/5 stars

Metacritic, which assigns a normalized rating out of 100 to reviews from mainstream publications, the album received an average score of 85 based on six reviews. The aggregator AnyDecentMusic? has the critical consensus of the album at a 7.8 out of 10, based on eight reviews.

Luke Morton of Kerrang! gave the album excellent 5 out of 5, saying: "There’s plenty to latch onto, whether it's the neck-rending riffs, the snarling/soaring vocals or just wanting to vibe out and let the darkness envelope you; it's a display of artistry". Sam Shepherd of musicOMH claimed: "Both artists possess in spades the ability to make affecting, heavyweight emotional music. This emotional intensity and willingness to continuously explore the possibilities of sound (heavy or otherwise) is what May Our Chambers Be Full pivots around over the course of these seven incredible songs". AllMusic's James Christopher Monger stated: "for all of its epic grandiosity, May Our Chambers Be Full only clocks in at a mere 37 minutes, but in doing so leaves a more indelible impression". Guy Oddy of The Arts Desk wrote: "Dramatic but melodic tunes that are relatively mellow and laidback one minute and then screaming and visceral the next". Dafydd Jenkins of Loud and Quiet said: "The whole LP would be a great release for either artist, but it's the brilliant convergence of sensibilities that sets it apart in the landscape of alternative metal". Todd Dedman of Beats Per Minute said: "it's the document of two beloved alt-metal worlds colliding to head-shuddering effect; a record of skull crushing intensity in places, with merciless riffs conjured up from the deepest abyss, which are counterpoised with quiet, ethereal dark-folk introspection – a mix that shouldn't really work but absolutely does". Grayson Haver Currin of Pitchfork said: "However exhilarating its discrete peaks, May Our Chambers Be Full is one of those common collaborations that's more notable for what it says about those who made it than for the new material itself".

=== Accolades ===
Publications' year-end list appearances for May Our Chambers Be Full
Critic/Publication	List	Rank	Ref
Consequence of Sound	Top 30 Metal/Hard Rock Albums of 2020	29	
Kerrang!	Top 50 Greatest Albums of 2020	10	
Metal Hammer	The 50 Best Metal Albums of 2020	25	
Stereogum	Top 50 Albums of 2020	47	
Treble Magazine	Top 25 Metal Albums of 2020	1	
Treble Magazine	Top 50 Albums of 2020	1	

== Track listing ==
May Our Chambers Be Full
No.	Title	Length
1.	"Killing Floor"	6:47
2.	"Monolith"	3:23
3.	"Out of Existence"	3:43
4.	"Ancestral Recall"	3:55
5.	"Magickal Cost"	4:10
6.	"Into Being"	5:16
7.	"The Valley"	8:58
Total length:		36:12

The Helm of Sorrow
No.	Title	Length
1.	"Orphan Limbs"	5:24
2.	"Crone Dance"	5:57
3.	"Recurrence"	4:57
4.	"Hollywood" (The Cranberries cover)	5:15
Total length:		21:33

== Personnel ==
- Louis Michot – fiddle (track 7)
- James Whitten – mixing, recording
- Adam Tucker – mastering
- Craig Mulcahy – layout, photography
- David Correll – layout
