= Two Parts Together =

Studio album by Big Ups
- Released: May 18, 2018
- Length: 30:17
- Label: Exploding in Sound

Big Ups chronology
Before a Million Universes (2016)	Two Parts Together (2018)

Professional ratings
Aggregate scores
Source	Rating
Metacritic	85/100
Review scores
Source	Rating
DIY	4/5 stars
Dork	4/5 stars
The Line of Best Fit	9/10
Loud and Quiet	7/10

Two Parts Together is the third and final studio album by American post-hardcore band Big Ups. It was released on May 18, 2018 under Exploding in Sound.

In support for the album, the band went on a US and Europe tour in May−July 2018.

== Critical reception ==
Two Parts Together was met with universal acclaim reviews from critics. At Metacritic, which assigns a weighted average rating out of 100 to reviews from mainstream publications, this release received an average score of 85, based on 4 reviews.

== Track listing ==
Two Parts Together track listing
No.	Title	Length
1.	"Two Parts Together"	4:06
2.	"In the Shade"	3:30
3.	"Trying to Love"	5:10
4.	"PPP"	2:35
5.	"Tenmile"	1:55
6.	"Fear"	4:43
7.	"Tell Them"	3:08
8.	"Imaginary Dog Walker"	5:10
