= Thou (American band) =

Louisiana sludge metal band

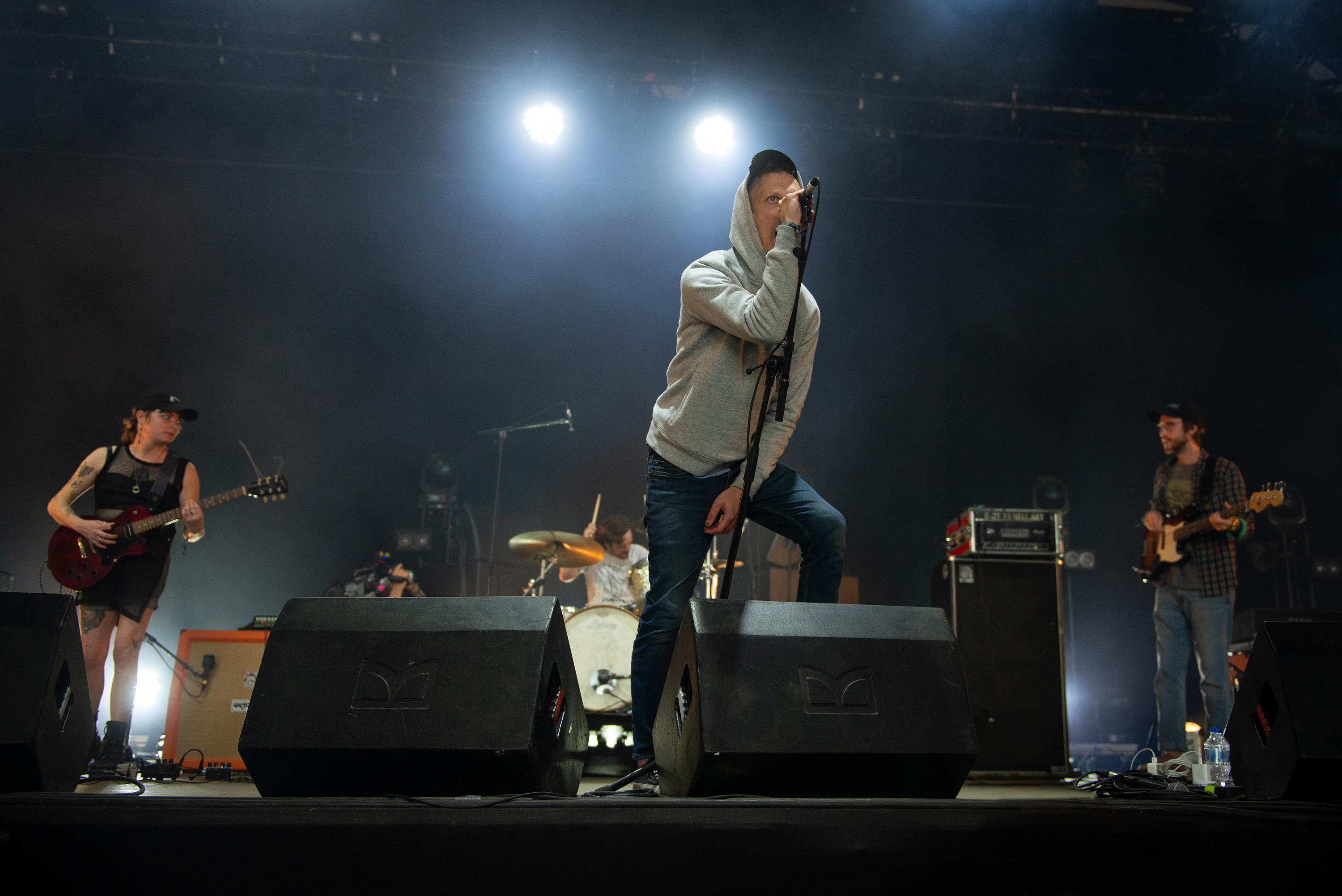
- Thou, Hellfest 2022.

Background information
- Origin: Baton Rouge, Louisiana, U.S.
- Genres: Sludge metal; doom metal
- Years active: 2005–present
- Labels: Robotic Empire; Thrill Jockey; Southern Lord; Get Better; Sacred Bones
- Members: Andy Gibbs; Matthew Thudium; Mitch Wells; Bryan Funck; Tyler Coburn; KC Stafford
- Past members: Terry Gulino; Josh Nee
- Website: noladiy.org/thou/

Thou is an American sludge metal band formed in Baton Rouge, Louisiana, in 2005. The current lineup of the band consists of Bryan Funck (vocals), Andy Gibbs (guitar), Matthew Thudium (guitar and vocals), Mitch Wells (bass), KC Stafford (guitar and vocals), and Tyler Coburn (drums).

== History ==
The band was formed by guitarists Andy Gibbs and Matthew Thudium, bassist Mitch Wells, and drummer Terry Gulino. Thou released their first full-length effort, Tyrant, in 2007 after the arrival of vocalist Bryan Funck. These were followed by their second studio album Peasant in 2008 and a string of EPs, including Malfeasance – Retribution (2008), The Retaliation of the Immutable Force of Nature (2008), Through the Empires of the Eternal Void (2009) and Baton Rouge/You Have Much to Answer For (2010). Their third full-length album, Summit was released in 2010.

The band's fourth studio album, Heathen, released in 2014, was met with critical acclaim. This album marked the first time in the band's career that the band had featured cleanly sung vocals from collaborator Emily McWilliams. The album was named the best metal album of 2014 by music website Pitchfork. Thou has toured with and collaborated frequently with fellow sludge metal band The Body, whom they most recently collaborated with on the album entitled, You, Whom I Have Always Hated.

On October 30, 2020, they released a collaboration album called May Our Chambers Be Full with Emma Ruth Rundle, which originated from a live collaboration between the two for the 2019 Roadburn Festival. 2024 saw the release of the sixth studio album Umbilical.

== Style and artistry ==
Thou's style has been labeled as "experimental doom", stoner metal and sludge metal. On the band's style, AllMusic critic Gregory Heaney stated that "the band's sound blends the shuddering heaviness of doom with the oppressive atmospherics of black metal, giving the band a monolithic sound that feels, at times, inescapable."

Thou has taken a 'do it yourself' approach to touring which has become a defining characteristic of the band and its aesthetic. Thou's lyrics often espouse anarchist views. Thou also has covered artists from various rock music genres, including Nine Inch Nails' "Terrible Lie" (with The Body), "Suck", and a full album of Nirvana covers titled Blessings of the Highest Order.

== Band members ==
Current members

- Bryan Funck – vocals (2007–present)
- Andy Gibbs – guitar (2005–present)
- Matthew Thudium – guitar (2005–present)
- Mitch Wells – bass (2005–present)
- Tyler Coburn – drums (2018–present)
- KC Stafford – guitar/bass/vocals (2018–present)

Former members

- Terry Gulino – drums (2005–2010)
- Josh Nee – drums (2010–2018)

== Discography ==
Studio albums

- Tyrant (2007, One Eye Records)
- Peasant (2008, Level Plane Records)
- Summit (2010, Gilead Media)
- Heathen (2014, Gilead Media)
- Magus (2018, Sacred Bones)
- Umbilical (2024, Sacred Bones)

Collaborative releases

- Released from Love (collaborative EP with The Body) (2014)
- You, Whom I Have Always Hated (collaborative album with The Body) (2015)
- May Our Chambers Be Full (collaborative album with Emma Ruth Rundle (2020)
- The Helm of Sorrow (collaborative EP with Emma Ruth Rundle (2021)
- Myopia (collaborative album with Mizmor) (2022)

Splits

- Thrive and Decay (Split 7" with Black September) (2008)
- We Pass Like Night... From Land to Land (Split-LP with Leech) (2008)
- Reincarnation Prayer (Split 7" with Haarp) (2009)
- Our Enemy Civilization (Split-LP with Salome) (2009)
- Degradation of Human Life (Split-LP with Mohoram Atta) (2009)
- Dwell in the Darkness of Thought and Drink the Poison of Life (Split EP with The City is the Tower) (2010)
- Tears That Soak a Callous Heart) (Split EP with Moloch) (2010)
- A Faire Quarrell (Split 7" with Human Intruder) (2010)
- War Is the Force That Gives Us Meaning: A Two Part Analysis of Personal and Inter-Personal Conflict (Split-LP with Cower) (2011)
- 4th of July (Split 7" with Kowloon Walled City) (2012)
- Resurrection Bay (Split 7" with Hell) (2012)
- Wingwalker/Prayer to God (Split 7" with Great Falls) (2015)
- Eyehatethou (Split EP with Barghest) (2015)
- I Have Become Your Pupil (Split with The HIRS Collective) (2018)
- Let Our Names Be Forgotten (Split EP with Ragana) (2018)

Demos

- Call No Man Happy Until He Is Dead (2005)
- Demo (2007)

Singles and EPs

- Malfeasance-Retribution (10") (2008)
- To Carry a Stone (7") (2008)
- The Retaliation of the Immutable Force of Nature (EP) (2008)
- Through the Empires of Eternal Void (2009)
- Baton Rouge, You Have Much to Answer For (EP) (2010)
- Big City (2011)
- To the Chaos Wizard Youth (EP) (2011)
- The Archer & The Owle (EP) (2011)
- The Sacrifice (EP) (2014)
- Only You Deserve Conceit (7") (2015)
- The House Primordial (2018)
- Inconsolable (2018)
- Rhea Sylvia (EP) (2018)

Compilation albums

- Oakland (2010)
- Rendon (2010)
- Ceremonies of Humiliation (2014)
- Algiers (2014)
- Blessings of the Highest Order (Nirvana covers) (2020, Robotic Empire)
- A Primer of Holy Words (covers) (2020, Robotic Empire)
- Hightower (2021, Robotic Empire)

Compilation contributions

- "Well Fed Fuck" (originally by Born Against; Compilation "Clone – Play Slow, Die Fast, Vol. II" (2009, Blind Date Records)
- "Milk It" (originally by Nirvana; tribute album In Utero, in Tribute, in Entirety) (2014, Robotic Empire)
- "Endless, Nameless"/"Even In His Youth" (originally by Nirvana; tribute album Whatever Nevermind) (2015, Robotic Empire)
- "Eyehatethou" (Adult Swim Singles 2015) (2015, Adult Swim)
- "Floyd the Barber" (originally by Nirvana; tribute album Doused in Mud, Soaked in Bleach) (2016, Robotic Empire)
- "Don't Let It Bring You Down" (originally by Neil Young; Compilation "Many Waters: Baton Rouge Flood Relief 2017" (2017, Thrill Jockey)
- "Maps" (originally by Yeah Yeah Yeahs); Compilation "Save Stereogum: An 00's Covers Compilation"
- "Them Bones" (originally by Alice In Chains); tribute album "Dirt Redux" (2020, Magnetic Eye Records)
- "Suck" (originally by Nine Inch Nails); tribute album " Best Of Nine Inch Nails (Redux)" (2025, Magnetic Eye Records)
