= All That Reckoning =

Studio album by Cowboy Junkies
- Released: July 13, 2018
- Studios: The Hangar, Toronto
- Genres: Alternative country, rock
- Length: 46:20
- Labels: Latent, Proper
- Producers: Michael Timmins, Alan Anton

Cowboy Junkies chronology
Notes Falling Slow (2015)	All That Reckoning (2018)	Ghosts (2020)

Professional ratings
Aggregate scores
Source	Rating
AnyDecentMusic?	7.3/10
Metacritic	83/100
Review scores
Source	Rating
AllMusic	3.5/5 stars
American Songwriter	4/5 stars
Exclaim!	7/10
Flood Magazine	7/10
The Guardian	3/5 stars
Financial Times	4/5 stars
Metro	7/10
Paste Magazine	6.6/10
The Times	4/5 stars
Uncut	8/10

All That Reckoning is an album by the Canadian alt-country band Cowboy Junkies, released in 2018. The album features eleven new songs to focus on "empty hearts, empty nests, lost paths, lost lives, and all the reckoning that brings about the end of things, and the beginnings of something else. [The] songs are about reckoning on a personal level and reckoning on a social level," as stated by Michael Timmins.

== Album development ==
The Junkies last recorded an album together in 2012, the final album of their Nomad series. Since then they worked on different projects, such as The Kennedy Suite, and other things, and just remained busy. According to Michael Timmins, they had released plenty of albums, and in the current business climate, the reasoning for releasing more music became more for the art than other factors. One "can get that part of one's personality massaged by doing live shows and small projects. A whole album is a lot of work. You sort of begin to think, 'Does anybody care anymore?' But it's hard for us to think about singles or whatever format people are purporting to be the new way of putting out music. So if we're going to record, for us, it's going to be an album."

Timmins accumulated songs that reached into the personal and political sides, songs that try to figure out where people are headed in the world, where society is heading, what the end results may look like. According to Michael Timmns, "There's a lot of pressures and a lot of crumbling of institutions, very little foundation to put one's feet on again, especially at an older age. You sort of expect things to be there and realize, 'My God, what I thought was a standard, whether it be an institution or a way of dealing with people in our society, is disappearing.'". After accumulating the songs, it was time to shape them artistically, and the Junkies went to their home studio to hammer All That Reckoning into shape. The poetry of William Blake provided inspiration for some of the songs, specifically, "The Angel" inspired "Mountain Stream", and "The Tyger" inspired "Missing Children". The music that Michael Timmins produces has a lot of input from the band these days. The songwriting part is Michael, a guitar, and solitude. After creating the lyrics, Michael mixes in the other band members voices and instruments to create the Junkie sound. Anton would display some elaborate bass lines, which Michael would write songs around, and then Margo and Peter would add her voice and his drums and fill out the songs. Then the songs would be played live before recording them, to clean up and round off the songs.

Michael Timmins goal when writing the album was to not just write about the current politics of the day, because that risks becoming irrelevant a few years later. The album has an internal dialogue, showing a reflection of the exterior world on the interior world and vice versa. In addition, the Junkies aimed to avoid a hard viewpoint, to not push a view, so as to include a large spectrum of viewpoints as held by their audience. One example of the album's internal and external voice is the two versions of the album's title track "All That Reckoning Part 1" and "All That Reckoning Part 2", with the first part displaying an unspoken dread of a relationship in crisis, and the second part a jagged psychedelic song full of anger. According to Michael Timmins, "[The songs] kind of fed into the title — the way we relate to each other, and the personal and the social — so it made sense in a high-concept way. But in a very basic way, we just liked the way both of them put the song across."

== Track listing ==
All tracks are written by Michael Timmins except where noted.

No.	Title	Writer(s)	Length
1.	"All That Reckoning (Part 1)"	Michael Timmins, Alan Anton	3:52
2.	"When We Arrive"	Michael Timmins, Anton	4:31
3.	"The Things We Do to Each Other"	Michael Timmins, Anton	3:56
4.	"Wooden Stairs"		4:22
5.	"Sing Me a Song"	Michael Timmins, Anton	4:20
6.	"Mountain Stream"		4:51
7.	"Missing Children"		3:40
8.	"Shining Teeth"		4:41
9.	"Nose Before Ear"		4:15
10.	"All That Reckoning (Part 2)"	Michael Timmins, Anton	4:29
11.	"The Possessed"		3:23
Total length:			46:20

== Personnel ==
Cowboy Junkies

- Margo Timmins – vocals
- Michael Timmins – guitar, ukulele
- Alan Anton – bass, keyboards
- Peter Timmins – drums, percussion

Additional musicians

- Bill Dillon – guitar solo (track 1, 10), backwards guitar (track 6, 9), lead guitar (track 7)
- Aaron Goldstein – lead guitar (track 1, 5, 10), leslie guitar (track 2)
- Jesse O'Brien – Organ (track 2, 9), piano (track 2–4, 9)
- James McKie – Fiddle (track 4, 7, 9)

Production

- Michael Timmins – producer, recorder, mixed by
- Alan Anton – co-producer
- Peter J. Moore – mastering
- Peter Timmins – artwork
- Jonny DeSilva – graphic design
- Viktor Jakovlev – photography
- Tiago dos Santos – photography
- Maheko Ciao – photography

== Charts ==
Chart	Peak position
US Americana/Folk Albums (Billboard)	24
Belgian Albums (Ultratop Flanders)	79
German Albums (Offizielle Top 100)	87
Dutch Albums (Album Top 100)	143
Belgian Albums (Ultratop Wallonia)	124
UK Albums (Official Charts)	78
