= Big Ups (band) =

American post-hardcore band

- Origin: Brooklyn, New York, United States
- Genres: Post-hardcore; post-punk; indie rock
- Years active: 2010–2019
- Labels: Dead Labour; Tough Love; Exploding In Sound
- Members: Brendan Finn; Joe Galarraga; Amar Lal; Carlos Salguero
- Website: bigups.bandcamp.com

Big Ups was an American post-hardcore band formed in Brooklyn, New York, in 2010. It was founded by lead singer Joe Galarraga, guitarist Amar Lal, bassist Carlos Salguero and drummer Brendan Finn.

== History ==
=== Eighteen Hours of Static (2014–2015) ===
On January 13, 2014 Big Ups released their debut album Eighteen Hours of Static through Dead Labour and Tough Love Records for North America and the UK/Europe respectively. The album received reviews from mainstream websites such as Pitchfork and Stereogum. Paul Thompson of Pitchfork gave the album a positive review, saying "Throughout Eighteen Hours of Static, arty Brooklyn post-punkers Big Ups' howling debut LP, vocalist Joe Galarraga and company put the world on notice. For 28 minutes, no grievance goes unaired, and no blood's left unlet."

=== Before a Million Universes (2016–2017) ===
On March 4, 2016 Big Ups released their sophomore album Before a Million Universes through Exploding in Sound Records and Tough Love Records for North America and the UK/Europe respectively.

=== Two Parts Together and hiatus (2018–2019) ===
On May 18, 2018 Big Ups released their third album Two Parts Together through Exploding in Sound Records.

In November, 2018 Big Ups announced an indefinite hiatus, stating “Since 2010, the four of us have dedicated ourselves to this project in a way that often neglects other aspects and dimensions of ourselves and our lives,” they wrote in a statement. “It’s time for us to branch out and grow.” They played their final show on January 18, 2019 at New York City's Bowery Ballroom.

== Musical style ==
The band have primarily been described as post-hardcore, post-punk and indie rock.

== Band members ==
- Brendan Finn – drums
- Joe Galarraga – lead vocals
- Amar Lal – guitar
- Carlos Salguero – bass guitar

== Discography ==
Studio albums

List of studio albums
Title	Album details
Eighteen Hours of Static	Released: January 13, 2014; Label: Dead Labour / Tough Love; Formats: CD, LP, Cass
Before a Million Universes	Released: March 4, 2016; Label: Exploding In Sound / Tough Love / Brace Yourself; Formats: CD, LP
Two Parts Together	Released: May 18, 2018; Label: Exploding In Sound; Formats: LP

Singles

Song	Year	Album
"Goes Black"	2013	Eighteen Hours of Static
"Justice"	2014	Eighteen Hours of Static
"Rash" / "Not Today"	2014	Non-album single
"Capitalized"	2015	Before a Million Universes
"National Parks"	2016	Before a Million Universes
"Hope for Someone"	2016	Before a Million Universes
"PPP"	2018	Two Parts Together
"Fear"	2018	Two Parts Together
"Imaginary Dog Walker"	2018	Two Parts Together

Music videos

List of music videos, showing year released and directors
Title	Year	Director(s)
"Goes Black"	2013	TerrorEyes
"Justice"	2014	Stephen Tringali
"National Parks"	2016	Robert Kolodny
"Fear"	2018	Brendan Finn
