= On Dark Horses =

Studio album by Emma Ruth Rundle
- Released: September 14, 2018
- Recorded: 2018
- Studio: LA LA Land (Louisville, KY)
- Genre: Post-rock; indie rock; alternative rock; folk rock
- Length: 42:03
- Label: Sargent House
- Producer: Kevin Ratterman

Emma Ruth Rundle chronology
Marked for Death (2016)	On Dark Horses (2018)	May Our Chambers Be Full (2020)

On Dark Horses is the fourth solo studio album by American singer-songwriter Emma Ruth Rundle. It was released on September 14, 2018 through Sargent House. Recording sessions took place in March 2018 at La La Land in Louisville, Kentucky. Production was handled by Kevin Ratterman.

== Critical reception ==
Professional ratings
Aggregate scores
Source	Rating
Metacritic	82/100
Review scores
Source	Rating
AllMusic	4/5 stars
Exclaim!	8/10
Metal Hammer	4/5 stars
Q	4/5 stars

On Dark Horses was met with universal acclaim from music critics. At Metacritic, which assigns a normalized rating out of 100 to reviews from mainstream publications, the album received an average score of 82 based on six reviews.

AllMusic's James Christopher Monger called the album "a far more collaborative affair, and while it still looks inward, it does so with the kind of steely warmth that can only come from somebody who has seen the light at the end of the tunnel as clearly as they've seen the oncoming train".

Matt Yuyitung of Exclaim! stated: "While Marked For Death felt more cathartic and Some Heavy Ocean felt more plaintive, there's no denying the emotional heft of On Dark Horses. This is another confident step forward by an artist who continues to dazzle us with new sides of herself". Victoria Segal of Q said: "There's an emotional spark here that never goes out".

A music critic from The Wire wrote: "Rundle explores shadowy dreams and gothic fantasies through a series of precariously balanced electrified compositions that hover around her—light as a feather one minute, heavy as lead the next. On Dark Horses rides headlong into the singer's psyche as she pulls us into the darkest corners of her imagination and breathes out fevered secrets".

A reviewer from The 405 said: "There’s no denying how incredibly dark and ominous Rundle's latest comes across, but as she slowly unearths hope, On Dark Horses offers a powerful reminder to take back control of your life, even when its crippling grasp clenches with fatal intent".

In a mixed review, Classic Rock magazine writer said, "the quiet/loud dynamic is an elegant partnership here".

Revolver ranked the album at No. 23 on its '30 Best Albums of 2018' list.

== Track listing ==
All tracks are written by Emma Ruth Rundle.

No.	Title	Length
1.	"Fever Dreams"	4:49
2.	"Control"	4:10
3.	"Darkhorse"	6:12
4.	"Races"	5:34
5.	"Dead Set Eyes"	4:58
6.	"Light Song"	5:50
7.	"Apathy on the Indiana Border"	4:46
8.	"You Don't Have to Cry"	5:44
Total length:		42:03

== Personnel ==
- Emma Ruth Rundle – lyrics, vocals, guitars, flute, percussion, artwork, photography
- Evan Patterson – vocals, guitar, piano, layout
- Todd Cook – bass
- Dylan Naydon – drums, percussion
- Kevin Ratterman – mixing, mastering, producer
- Ann Gauthier – assistant engineering

== Charts ==
Chart (2018)	Peak position
UK Record Store (OCC)	38
