= Heathen (Thou album) =

Studio album by Thou
- Released: March 25, 2014
- Genre: Doom metal; sludge metal
- Length: 74:21
- Label: Gilead Media
- Producer: James Whitten

Thou chronology
The Archer & The Owle EP (2011)	Heathen (2014)	Released from Love EP (2014)

Heathen is the fourth studio album by American metal band Thou. It was released on March 25, 2014 through Gilead Media.

== Critical reception ==
Professional ratings
Review scores
Source	Rating
Allmusic	4.5/5 stars
CraveOnline	10/10
Pitchfork	8.4/10

The album generally received rave reviews from music critics. Allmusic critic Gregory Heaney praised the album, writing that it "rewards repeat listens with new surprises, giving anyone with the fortitude to wade through the muck and sludge even more glimpses at the warm, shoegaze center that lives at the heart of this doomy juggernaut." Iann Robinson of CraveOnline awarded the album with a perfect score, stating: "Heathen leaves you breathless, stammering for a way to process everything you’ve just heard." Robinson also added that the band "are able to translate the darkest parts of the human soul into music, and for that we should all be grateful." Pitchfork's Kim Kelly described the album as "a portrait of a band that is in complete harmony with itself, if not the world it inhabits." Michael Nelson of Stereogum regarded the record as "a dark, bombastic, hugely ambitious album of great sorrow, but perhaps even greater beauty," while Spin magazine described it as "the culmination of all that perspiration, almost cinematic in the scope of the suffering and seething anger it portrays." The Quietus' Robin Smith thought the record as "doom metal siren song – its beauty is incidental to a forever kind of pain."

=== Accolades ===
Publication	Country	Accolade	Rank
Decibel	US	Top 40 Albums of 2014	6
NPR	US	10 Favorite Metal Albums Of 2014	–
Pitchfork	US	The Best Metal Albums of 2014	1
Spin	US	The 20 Best Metal Albums of 2014	6
Stereogum	US	The 50 Best Metal Albums Of 2014	9
Treblezine	US	Top 10 Metal Albums of 2014	8

== Track listing ==
No.	Title	Length
1.	"Free Will"	14:35
2.	"Dawn"	1:18
3.	"Feral Faun"	9:26
4.	"Into the Marshland"	6:58
5.	"Clarity"	0:45
6.	"At the Foot of Mt. Driskill"	11:19
7.	"In Defiance of the Sages"	5:32
8.	"Take off Your Skin and Dance in Your Bones"	2:12
9.	"Immorality Dictates"	10:30
10.	"Ode to Physical Pain"	11:46

== Personnel ==
Thou

- Bryan Funck – vocals
- Andy Gibbs – guitar
- Matthew Thudium – guitar
- Mitch Wells – bass guitar
- Josh Nee – drums

Guest contributions

- Emily McWilliams – vocals
- Derek Zimmer – vocals

Technical personnel

- James Whitten – mixing, recording, production
- Adam Tucker – mastering
- Mike Jones – layout
