= Magus (album) =

Studio album by Thou
- Released: August 31, 2018
- Genre: Sludge metal
- Length: 75:38
- Label: Sacred Bones

Thou chronology
| Rhea Sylvia (2015) | Magus (2018) | May Our Chambers Be Full (2020) |

Professional ratings
Aggregate scores
| Source | Rating |
|---|---|
| Metacritic | 83/100 |
Review scores
| Source | Rating |
| AllMusic | 4/5 stars |
| Drowned in Sound | 8/10 |
| Pitchfork | 7.8/10 |
| Sputnikmusic | 4.5/5 stars |

Magus is the fifth studio album by American sludge metal band Thou. It was released on August 31, 2018 through Sacred Bones Records.

== Accolades ==
| Publication | Accolade | Rank | Ref. |
|---|---|---|---|
| BrooklynVegan | Top 50 Albums of 2018 | 15 | |
| Decibel | Top 40 Albums of 2018 | 34 | |
| Noisey | Top 100 Albums of 2018 | 12 | |
| No Ripcord | Top 50 Albums of 2018 | 20 | |
| NPR | Top 50 Albums of 2018 | 43 | |
| PopMatters | Top 20 Metal Albums of 2018 | 19 | |
| Sputnikmusic | Top 50 Albums of 2018 | 9 | |
| Treble | Top 23 Metal Albums of 2018 | 1 | |

== Track listing ==
| No. | Title | Length |
|---|---|---|
| 1. | "Inward" | 10:08 |
| 2. | "My Brother Caliban" | 1:04 |
| 3. | "Transcending Dualities" | 8:52 |
| 4. | "The Changeling Prince" | 6:29 |
| 5. | "Sovereign Self" | 10:15 |
| 6. | "Divine Will" | 1:34 |
| 7. | "In the Kingdom of Meaning" | 9:33 |
| 8. | "Greater Invocation of Disgust" | 5:59 |
| 9. | "Elimination Rhetoric" | 7:53 |
| 10. | "The Law Which Compels" | 2:58 |
| 11. | "Supremacy" | 10:53 |

== Charts ==
| Chart | Peak position |
|---|---|
| US Independent Albums (Billboard) | 18 |
| US Vinyl Albums (Billboard) | 8 |
