= Platinum & Gold Collection (Cowboy Junkies album) =

Compilation album by Cowboy Junkies
- Released: September 9, 2003
- Genre: Alternative country, blues rock
- Length: 53:15
- Label: RCA

Cowboy Junkies chronology
Open Road (2002)	Platinum & Gold Collection (2003)	In the Time Before Llamas (2003)

Professional ratings
Review scores
Source	Rating
AllMusic	4/5 stars
Encyclopedia of Popular Music	3/5 stars

Platinum & Gold Collection is a 2003 compilation of Cowboy Junkies songs recorded for RCA Records. The album is the second compilation of the band's singles released by RCA in just three years, following 2001's Best of the Cowboy Junkies, and is part of the label's Platinum & Gold Collection series of discount-priced singles anthologies. All songs are drawn from the band's RCA Records albums: The Trinity Session, The Caution Horses, Black Eyed Man and Pale Sun, Crescent Moon.

== Track listing ==
All tracks are written by Michael Timmins, except where noted.

No.	Title	Writer(s)	From the album	Length
1.	"Sweet Jane"	Lou Reed	The Trinity Session, 1988	3:37
2.	"Blue Moon Revisited (Song for Elvis)"	Michael Timmins, Margo Timmins, Richard Rodgers, Lorenz Hart	The Trinity Session	4:30
3.	"Anniversary Song"		Pale Sun, Crescent Moon, 1993	3:13
4.	"This Street, That Man, This Life"		Black Eyed Man, 1992	3:16
5.	"Misguided Angel"		The Trinity Session	4:55
6.	"A Horse in the Country"		Black Eyed Man	3:52
7.	"The Post"	J Mascis	Pale Sun, Crescent Moon	4:39
8.	"Murder, Tonight, in the Trailer Park"		Black Eyed Man	4:32
9.	"I'm So Lonesome I Could Cry"	Hank Williams	The Trinity Session	5:27
10.	"Seven Years"		Pale Sun, Crescent Moon	4:56
11.	"Dreaming My Dreams with You"		The Trinity Session	4:33
12.	"Powderfinger"	Neil Young	The Caution Horses, 1990	5:45
Total length:				53:15

== Fan reception ==
RCA assembled this greatest hits album without participation with the band, using the albums in the RCA catalog. Junkies fan sites suggest boycotting the album, and support the purchasing Waltz Across America instead.
