= Best of the Cowboy Junkies =

Greatest hits album by Cowboy Junkies
- Released: August 21, 2001
- Genre: Alternative country, blues rock
- Length: 1:07:42
- Label: RCA
- Producer: Paul Williams

Cowboy Junkies chronology
Open (2001)	Best of the Cowboy Junkies (2001)	The Radio One Sessions (2002)

Alternative Cover

Professional ratings
Review scores
Source	Rating
AllMusic	4/5 stars
Encyclopedia of Popular Music	4/5 stars

Best of the Cowboy Junkies is a 2001 greatest hits compilation of Cowboy Junkies' songs recorded for RCA Records. All songs are drawn from the band's RCA Records albums: The Trinity Session, The Caution Horses, Black Eyed Man and Pale Sun, Crescent Moon.

== Track listing ==
All tracks are written by Michael Timmins, except where noted.

No.	Title	Writer(s)	From the album	Length
1.	"Blue Moon Revisited (Song for Elvis)"	Michael Timmins, Margo Timmins, Richard Rodgers, Lorenz Hart	The Trinity Session, 1988	4:31
2.	"Sweet Jane"	Lou Reed	The Trinity Session	3:37
3.	"Misguided Angel"	Michael Timmins, Margo Timmins	The Trinity Session	4:55
4.	"I'm So Lonesome I Could Cry"	Hank Williams	The Trinity Session	5:28
5.	"Rock and Bird"		The Caution Horses, 1990	3:32
6.	"Sun Comes Up, It's Tuesday Morning"		The Caution Horses	3:59
7.	"Escape Is So Simple"		The Caution Horses	5:18
8.	"Cause Cheap Is How I Feel"		The Caution Horses	4:17
9.	"To Live Is to Fly"	Townes Van Zandt	Black Eyed Man, 1992	4:27
10.	"Murder, Tonight, in the Trailer Park"		Black Eyed Man	4:33
11.	"Southern Rain"		Black Eyed Man	4:53
12.	"Cowboy Junkies Lament"	Townes Van Zandt	Black Eyed Man	3:10
13.	"Anniversary Song"		Pale Sun, Crescent Moon, 1993	3:13
14.	"Cold Tea Blues"		Pale Sun, Crescent Moon	2:48
15.	"Ring on the Sill"		Pale Sun, Crescent Moon	4:24
16.	"Hard to Explain"	Ray Agee	Pale Sun, Crescent Moon	4:37
Total length:				67:42

Bonus track on UK version
No.	Title	From the album	Length
17.	"A Horse in the Country"	Black Eyed Man	3:50

== Fan reception ==
RCA assembled this greatest hits album without participation with the band, using the albums in the RCA catalog. Junkies fan sites suggest boycotting the album, and support the purchasing Waltz Across America instead.
