= Songs of the Recollection =

Studio album by Cowboy Junkies
- Released: March 25, 2022
- Genre: Rock
- Length: 43:07
- Language: English
- Label: Latent Recordings
- Producer: Michael Timmins
- Compiler: Cowboy Junkies

Cowboy Junkies chronology
Ghosts (2020)	Songs of the Recollection (2022)	Sharon (2022)

Songs of the Recollection is a 2022 studio album from Canadian rock band Cowboy Junkies, mostly made up of cover versions of songs from the band's formative years. It has received positive reviews for the band's ability to transform the originals to match their strengths as performers.

== Recording and release ==
Several of the songs ("Ooh Las Vegas", "The Way I Feel", "Marathon", and "Seventeen Seconds") on this collection were previously on B-sides or various artists compilations. Cowboy Junkies have a history of incorporating covers into their repertoire, going back to their debut album, Whites Off Earth Now!! By focusing on music from the late 1960s and early 1970s, the band wanted to recreate their experience listening to music as fans before they were ever professional performers themselves.

== Critical and commercial reception ==
The editorial staff of AllMusic Guide scored this album 3.5 out of five stars, with reviewer Mark Deming pointing out the excellence of each band member and noting that they "have maintained a creative vision that's served them beautifully" that allows them to "find unexplored landscapes in the work of other tunesmiths". Liz Thomson of The Arts Desk gave it five out of five stars, pointing out the care the band exercised in choosing the songs and how "each is carefully thought-out and reworked". In Hot Press, Pat Carty noted the ability of Cowboy Junkies to reinterpret all of the songs and calls this album "a worthy endeavour". Sarah Bea Milner of Exclaim! rated Songs of the Recollection a seven out of 10 for the band putting "their stamp on iconic songs, transforming the music to match their signature style", calling it a "joy to listen to", but noting that "existing fans will love this about the album, but newcomers might be turned off by the uniform approach throughout". Mojo's Sylvie Simmons gave this album four out of five stars, noting that this album is not filler and wonderful to listen to. Writing for Uncut, Nick Hasted rated this album a seven out of 10, noting the diversity of sounds on the recordings. Lee Zimmerman of American Songwriter scored Songs of the Recollection three out of five for the band's ability to have good taste in music and an ability to make the songs their own, summing up that they have "corralled another winner".

The album spent one week on the German charts at 86.

== Track listing ==
1. "Five Years" (David Bowie) – 4:25
2. "Ooh Las Vegas" (Gram Parsons, Ric Grech) – 5:19
3. "No Expectations" (Jagger/Richards) – 4:13
4. "Don't Let It Bring You Down" (Neil Young) – 4:28
5. "Love in Mind" (Young) – 3:44
6. "The Way I Feel" (Gordon Lightfoot) – 4:13
7. "I've Made Up My Mind to Give Myself to You" (Bob Dylan) – 6:33
8. "Marathon" (Vic Chesnutt) – 5:22
9. "Seventeen Seconds" (Simon Gallup, Matthieu Hartley, Robert Smith, Laurence Tolhurst) – 4:46

== Personnel ==
Cowboy Junkies

- Alan Anton – bass guitar, keyboards
- Margo Timmins – vocals
- Michael Timmins – guitar; ukulele; recording; mixing on "Five Years", "No Expectations", "Don't Let It Bring You Down", "Love in Mind", "I've Made Up My Mind to Give Myself to You", "Marathon", and "Seventeen Seconds"; production
- Peter Timmins – drums, artwork

Additional personnel

- Jeff Bird – electric mandolin on "Five Years", "Don't Let It Bring You Down", and "Love in Mind"
- Jonny DeSilva – graphic design
- Aaron Goldstein – dobro and pedal steel guitar on "No Expectations")
- Chris Lord-Alge – mixing on "Ooh Las Vegas"
- Andy Maize – vocals on "Marathon"
- Peter J Moore – mastering
- Jesse O'Brien – piano on "No Expectations"
- Jeff Wolpert – mixing on "The Way I Feel"

== See also ==
- Lists of 2022 albums
