= Notes Falling Slow =

Box set by Cowboy Junkies
- Released: October 30, 2015
- Genre: Alternative country, country rock, folk rock
- Length: 3:01:02
- Label: Latent, Razor & Tie, Diverse Records
- Producer: Michael Timmins

Cowboy Junkies chronology
The Nomad Series (2012)	Notes Falling Slow (2015)	All That Reckoning (2018)

Notes Falling Slow is a box set by the Canadian alt-country band Cowboy Junkies, containing remastered version of the 2001 album Open, the 2004 album One Soul Now, and the 2007 album At the End of Paths Taken on the first three discs, plus songs worked on during the creation of the three albums but not included. Some of the tracks were not previously completed, some were not demoed, and others were cut but did not make the final set. All these tracks have been newly recorded for this box set and included on the final disc, effectively creating a new Cowboy Junkies album.

== Track listing ==
All tracks are written by Michael Timmins, except where noted

Disc 1 - Open
No.	Title	Writer(s)	Length
1.	"I Did It All for You"		5:07
2.	"Dragging Hooks (River Song Trilogy, Part III)"	Michael Timmins, Alan Anton, Peter Timmins	7:49
3.	"Bread and Wine"		4:36
4.	"Upon Still Waters"		3:23
5.	"Dark Hole Again"		7:43
6.	"Thousand Year Prayer"		4:17
7.	"I'm So Open"		4:09
8.	"Small Swift Birds"		3:47
9.	"Beneath the Gate"		4:08
10.	"Close My Eyes"		4:20
Total length:			49:19

Disc 2 - One Soul Now
No.	Title	Length
1.	"One Soul Now"	4:54
2.	"Why This One"	3:47
3.	"My Wild Child"	3:52
4.	"From Hunting Ground to City Street"	4:41
5.	"The Stars of Our Stars"	4:19
6.	"Notes Falling Slow"	5:56
7.	"No Long Journey Home"	4:17
8.	"He Will Call You Baby"	5:47
9.	"Simon Keeper"	5:52
10.	"The Slide"	3:49
Total length:		47:14

Disc 3 - At the End of Paths Taken
No.	Title	Writer(s)	Length
1.	"Brand New World"		5:31
2.	"Still Lost"		4:45
3.	"Cutting Board Blues"		4:05
4.	"Spiral Down"		3:33
5.	"My Little Basquiat"	Michael Timmins, Alan Anton	3:51
6.	"Someday Soon"		3:17
7.	"Follower 2"		6:18
8.	"It Really Doesn't Matter Anyway"	Michael Timmins, Alan Anton	4:42
9.	"Blue Eyed Saviour"		2:37
10.	"Mountain"	Michael Timmins, Alan Anton	7:07
11.	"My Only Guarantee"		3:29
Total length:			49:15

Disc 4 - previously unreleased material
No.	Title	Length
1.	"Also One"	3:50
2.	"Shrike"	2:53
3.	"Morning Cried"	5:10
4.	"Cold Evening Wind"	4:32
5.	"So They Say"	3:58
6.	"Three Wishes"	3:37
7.	"The Slide"	3:03
8.	"Done Your Time"	3:36
9.	"Ikea Parking Lot"	4:35
Total length:		35:14
