= Such Ferocious Beauty =

Studio album by Cowboy Junkies
- Released: June 2, 2023
- Recorded: 2022
- Studios: The Hangar, Toronto, Ontario, Canada
- Genre: Americana
- Length: 39:05
- Language: English
- Label: Cooking Vinyl/Latent Recordings
- Producers: Alan Anton; Michael Timmins

Cowboy Junkies chronology
Sharon (2022)	Such Ferocious Beauty (2023)

“This record is connected to All That Reckoning. I see our recent work in a cycle: Reckoning, Ghosts, Such Ferocious Beauty. They were all done in very violent and tumultuous times. The violent side is so much a part of our society now; not just the physical, but the way we relate to each other. It’s hard to escape.”

— Guitarist and songwriter Michael Timmins on themes in Such Ferocious Beauty.

Such Ferocious Beauty is a 2023 studio album by Canadian rock band Cowboy Junkies. Exploring themes of grief, the work has received positive reviews from critics.

== Recording and release ==
Most members of Cowboy Junkies are siblings and when their father was diagnosed with dementia in 2021, guitarist and songwriter Michael Timmins accelerated his songwriting with music that grappled with the emotions around this event and their mother's 2018 death. Due to COVID-19 restrictions to avoid gathering together, he rented a barn as a practice space where he workshopped songs on solo acoustic guitar. The Timmins children assisted in their parents' dying process as they both died at home and the lyrics explored issues of impermanence, grief, and the tension between beautiful and emotionally difficult parts of life. Timmins also used mythology and Judeo-Christian religious themes to discuss his personal life. He mixed the album twice, but was displeased with the sound and brought in Joby Baker to finalize it.

== Reception ==
According to the review aggregator Metacritic, Such Ferocious Beauty received "generally favorable reviews" based on a weighted average score of 75 out of 100 from seven critic scores. Editors at AllMusic rated this album 3.5 out of 5 stars, with critic Mark Deming writing that "these ten songs are open in their contemplation of death and its aftermath, the gnawing sense of loss, the anger and confusion brought on after losing a loved one, and the not-always-comforting contemplation of the afterlife" and summing up that "fans who have developed a taste for the sweet sadness of the Cowboy Junkies' best work may find Such Ferocious Beauty a bit strong and confrontational for their taste, but that's very much the point of this music; this isn't rooted in solace, but in exorcising the demons that come from losing loved ones, and it's a difficult but eloquent act of public mourning". Hal Horowitz of American Songwriter scored this album 4 out of 5 stars, stating that these songs "carve a distinctive sonic side road into a generally darker off-ramp of Americana" that "is provocative, artsy, but never pretentious, stuff". John Moore of Glide Magazine called this work "moody, sweet, sad, and strongly affecting sketches about growing older" and sums up that "though they’ve grown as musicians and songwriters over the decades, the core of the band’s sound is the same as it ever was".

In Mojo, John Aizlewood scored Such Ferocious Beauty 3 out of 5 stars, stating that "there's real evolution" from the band's songwriting template. No Depression's John Amen wrote that this album "spotlights the Canadian quartet breaking new ground" and that "as a whole, is decidedly plaintive, though the band adeptly sidesteps fatalism, instead expressing adrenalized grief and engaging in philosophic inquiry". Tony Stuart of Spill Magazine rated this work 4 out of 5 for being "an album that requires careful listening to be appreciated". Writing for Under the Radar, Ian Rushbury scored this album 8 out of 10, characterizing this as a "superb" album "that takes the most heartbreaking and difficult subject matter and weaves it into something strangely uplifting".

== Track listing ==
1. "What I Lost" (Alan Anton and Michael Timmins) – 3:47
2. "Flood" (Anton and Timmins) – 4:23
3. "Hard to Build. Easy to Break" (Anton and Timmins) – 4:18
4. "Circe and Penelope" (Timmins) – 3:36
5. "Hell Is Real" (Timmins) – 3:33
6. "Shadows 2" (Timmins) – 3:40
7. "Knives" (Anton and Timmins) – 4:29
8. "Mike Tyson (Here It Comes)" (Anton and Timmins) – 4:02
9. "Throw a Match" (Timmins) – 3:44
10. "Blue Skies" (Timmins) – 3:33

== Personnel ==
Cowboy Junkies

- Alan Anton – bass guitar, keyboards, piano, production
- Margo Timmins – vocals
- Michael Timmins – guitar, six-string bass guitar, ukulele, engineering, production
- Peter Timmins – drums, percussion, artwork

Additional personnel

- Joby Baker – mixing
- Cameron Hagreen – graphic design
- James McKie – fiddle, electric guitar
- Peter J. Moore – mastering
- Christine Peterson – photography
- Kyle Sullivan – drums

== Chart performance ==
Chart (2024)	Peak position
UK Country Albums Chart	1

== See also ==
- 2023 in Canadian music
- List of 2023 albums
