= One Soul Now =

Studio album by Cowboy Junkies
- Released: June 8, 2004
- Recorded: October 2002 – October 2003
- Genre: Alternative country
- Length: 47:14
- Label: Latent, Zoë
- Producer: Michael Timmins

Cowboy Junkies chronology
In the Time Before Llamas (2003)	One Soul Now (2004)	Early 21st Century Blues (2005)

Professional ratings
Review scores
Source	Rating
AllMusic	2.5/5 stars
Encyclopedia of Popular Music	3/5 stars

One Soul Now is a 2004 album by the Canadian alt-country band Cowboy Junkies. It is their first album of new material since Open in 2001. It was released on Latent Recordings in Canada, and Zoë Records internationally.

== Album development ==
The album title emerged from a quote from John Steinbeck's novel, The Grapes of Wrath: "Maybe it's all men and all women we love; maybe that's the Holy Sperit – the human sperit – the whole shebang. Maybe all men got one big soul ever'body’s a part of." The idea behind One Soul Now is that everyone is interconnected.

While the Cowboy Junkies was touring to support Open, the band members started collecting second-hand recording equipment without a plan or purpose, just a need. When the band was back home, they looked at all the recording studios, and decided to set up the recording equipment in their rehearsal area, eventually turning their space into a recording studio, The Clubhouse. One Soul Now is the first album the band made in their new studio. Having their rehearsal space become their recording studio changed the process of creating their tracks. Previously, they would start in the rehearsal space, determine how the songs would work, then go to a studio when ready. Now, the band recorded everything as they worked through the rehearsal process. Later, when they listened to the recordings, the Junkies could pick out the recording where the songs were most vibrant. Per the band, "For example "He Will Call You Baby" was recorded as the band was learning the arrangement and still unsure; "No Long Journey Home" was a trial run through with embellishments added later; "The Stars of Our Stars" was broken down into individual instruments and recorded piece by piece over the course of many weeks..." The band's ninth studio album is their first album recorded without an outside producer or engineer. One song, "Simon Keeper", was recorded much earlier, during the Open sessions at Daryl Smith's recording studio, Chemical Sound.

The Cowboy Junkies also recorded a 5-song bonus EP of cover songs that they labeled 'neath your covers, part 1. They gave away the bonus CD free with every purchase of the One Soul Now CD while supplies lasted.

== Track listing ==
All tracks are written by Michael Timmins.

No.	Title	Length
1.	"One Soul Now"	4:54
2.	"Why This One"	3:47
3.	"My Wild Child"	3:52
4.	"From Hunting Ground to City"	4:41
5.	"The Stars of Our Stars"	4:19
6.	"Notes Falling Slow"	5:56
7.	"No Long Journey Home"	4:17
8.	"He Will Call You Baby"	5:47
9.	"Simon Keeper"	5:52
10.	"The Slide"	3:49
Total length:		47:14

'neath Your Covers, Part 1 (bonus EP)
No.	Title	Writer(s)	Length
11.	"Thunder Road"	Bruce Springsteen	5:05
12.	"Seventeen Seconds"	Robert Smith, Simon Gallup, Laurence Tolhurst, Matthieu Hartley	4:46
13.	"Lungs"	Townes Van Zandt	3:10
14.	"Darkness, Darkness"	Jesse Colin Young	4:56
15.	"Helpless"	Neil Young	5:27

== Personnel ==
Cowboy Junkies

- Margo Timmins – vocals
- Michael Timmins – guitar
- Alan Anton – bass
- Peter Timmins – drums

Additional musicians

- Jeff Bird – percussion, electronic mandolin (track 9), melodica (track 5)
- Jaro Czerwinec – accordion (track 9)
- Linford Detweiler – organ (track 9)
- Richard Bell – organ, piano

Production

- Michael Timmins – producer, engineer, mixing
- Peter Moore – mastering
- Jeff Wolpert – mixing
- Daryl Smith – engineer, mixing
- Michael Sponarski – engineer
- David Houghton – art direction
- Open Circle – cover design
