= Sing in My Meadow =

Studio album by Cowboy Junkies
- Released: October 17, 2011
- Genre: Alternative country
- Length: 40:16
- Labels: Latent, Diverse Records
- Producer: Michael Timmins

Cowboy Junkies chronology
Demons (2011)	Sing in My Meadow (2011)	The Wilderness (2012)

Sing in My Meadow is an album by the Canadian alt-country band Cowboy Junkies, released in 2011. It is Volume Three of the Nomad Series. The album was recorded at The Clubhouse in Toronto, Ontario. This volume of the Nomad Series brings the band's live shows into the studio, employing their touring musicians as the only recording musicians for the sessions.

== Development ==
The album was recorded in four days, showcasing the free-wheeling energy of the band's live concerts.

== Track listing ==
All tracks are written by Michael Timmins except where noted.

Sing in My Meadow
No.	Title	Writer(s)	Length
1.	"Continental Drift"		5:06
2.	"It's Heavy Down Here"		5:09
3.	"3rd Crusade"	Michael Timmins, Alan Anton	4:13
4.	"Late Night Radio"		4:59
5.	"Sing in My Meadow"		4:28
6.	"Hunted"		4:29
7.	"A Bride's Price"	Michael Timmins, Alan Anton	5:51
8.	"I Move On"		6:01
Total length:			40:16

Digital Bonus Tracks
No.	Title	Writer(s)	Length
1.	"Mountain"		5:57
2.	"My Little Basquiat"		5:50
3.	"Spiral Down"		3:37
4.	"Lay It Down"	Michael Timmins	11:35
5.	"Follower 2"		6:27

== Personnel ==
Cowboy Junkies

- Margo Timmins – lead vocals
- Michael Timmins – guitar
- Alan Anton – bass
- Peter Timmins – drums

Additional musician

- Jeff Bird – harmonica, electric mandolin

Production

- Michael Timmins – producer, engineer, mixed by
- Peter Moore – mastered at the E Room
- Alice Phieu – graphics design
- Enrique Martinez Celaya – cover images
