= The Wilderness (Cowboy Junkies album) =

Studio album by Cowboy Junkies
- Released: March 27, 2012
- Genre: Alternative country
- Length: 42:33
- Labels: Latent, Razor & Tie, Diverse Records

Cowboy Junkies chronology
Sing in My Meadow (2011)	The Wilderness (2012)	The Nomad Series (2012)

The Wilderness is an album by the Canadian alt-country band Cowboy Junkies, released in 2012. It is Volume Four of the Nomad Series. This volume is the introspection of winter after Sing in My Meadow's joyful visitation of spring.

== Background ==
The album is a return to the folk vibe the band played with in the late 80s and early 90s. The songwriter, Michael Timmins, "started to think in terms of an album of songs reflecting on the lives of characters I'd written about early in the band’s career and bringing those characters 20 years into the future to see where their lives were at now. Some of those songs have little touch points where, if you're a real freak and analyze the music, you can see how they connect to earlier songs -- even character's names and stuff pops into them, and that's intentional. It was fun to sit and go over those older songs and some of the ideas I was thinking about and exploring and believed in and seeing 20 years later where I sit with some of those ideas. It's always fascinating to do that with yourself and with the songs. It's a treat for me, anyway." The style of the songs on the album resemble earlier Cowboy Junkies music more than the other albums in the Nomad series. The Cowboy Junkies had turned their back on major labels, which gave them the independence to explore various themes for the Nomad series, to experiment with their music.

== Track listing ==
All tracks are written by Michael Timmins except where noted.

No.	Title	Writer(s)	Length
1.	"Unanswered Letter (for JB)"		5:21
2.	"Idle Tales"		4:06
3.	"We Are the Selfish Ones"		2:39
4.	"Angels in the Wilderness"		4:45
5.	"Damaged from the Start"		3:48
6.	"Fairytale"		4:23
7.	"Staring Man"	Michael Timmins, Elizabeth Bishop	4:01
8.	"The Confession of Georgie E"		6:00
9.	"I Let Him In"		4:13
10.	"Fuck, I Hate the Cold"		3:17
Total length:			42:33

Digital bonus tracks
No.	Title	Length
1.	"Demons"	3:42
2.	"Girl Behind the Man the Gun"	5:37
3.	"Lo"	2:56
4.	"My Boy Burns"	4:47
5.	"Punching Holes Through"	4:30

== Personnel ==
Cowboy Junkies

- Margo Timmins – lead vocals
- Michael Timmins – guitar
- Alan Anton – bass
- Peter Timmins – drums

Additional musicians

- Jeff Bird – mandolin
- Matt Bailey – guitar
- Miranda Mulholland – violin
- Joby Baker – bowed bass, drums, organ, piano, Wurlitzer, background vocals
- Michael Davidson – vibraphone
- Jesse O'Brien – organ, piano, Wurlitzer

Production

- Michael Timmins – producer, engineer, mixed by
- Peter J. Moore – mastered at the E Room
- Alice Phieu – graphics design
- Enrique Martinez Celaya – cover image
