= Ghosts (Cowboy Junkies album) =

Studio album by Cowboy Junkies
- Released: March 30, 2020
- Length: 30:41
- Label: Latent
- Producer: Michael Timmins, Alan Anton

Cowboy Junkies chronology
All That Reckoning (2018)	Ghosts (2020)	Songs of the Recollection (2022)

Ghosts is an album by the Canadian alt-country band Cowboy Junkies, released digitally on March 30, 2020. The album features eight songs that process the loss of the Timmins siblings' mother who died in 2018. The album was also released on vinyl as a limited edition combined package with All That Reckoning on March 10, 2021.

== Album development ==
Two months after the release of All That Reckoning, Barbara Timmins, the mother of Michael, Margo, and Peter, died. As the band toured to support their 2018 album, the Cowboy Junkies worked on the collection of songs that grew into Ghosts. The band had planned in 2020 to re-release a remastered version of All That Reckoning as a vinyl double album with Ghosts being the second disc. The COVID-19 pandemic delayed the project. The Junkies chose to release the album digitally in early 2020. The combined vinyl double album was finally released in 2021.

The album reprises "The Possessed" from All That Reckoning, where it serves as a sparse ukulele break in the middle of songs with fuller instrumentation such as the guitars on "Grace Descends" and "(You Don't Get to) Do It Again" on the front half and "Misery" and the fiddle filled "This Dog Barks" on the back half.

== Critical reception ==
The editorial staff of AllMusic Guide gave Ghosts four out of five stars, with reviewer Mark Deming calling it "a brave and impressive effort that's as effective as it was necessary".

== Track listing ==
Ghosts track listing
No.	Title	Writer(s)	Length
1.	"Desire Lines"	Michael Timmins	5:58
2.	"Breathing"	Alan Anton, Timmins	3:24
3.	"Grace Descends"	Anton, Timmins	3:48
4.	"(You Don't Get to) Do It Again"	Anton, Timmins	4:32
5.	"The Possessed"	Timmins	3:22
6.	"Misery"	Timmins	2:51
7.	"This Dog Barks"	Timmins	3:25
8.	"Ornette Coleman"	Timmins	3:21
Total length:			30:41

== Personnel ==
Cowboy Junkies

- Margo Timmins – vocals
- Michael Timmins – guitar, ukulele
- Alan Anton – bass, keyboards
- Peter Timmins – drums, percussion

Production

- Michael Timmins – producer, engineer, mixed by
- Alan Anton – producer
- Peter Timmins – artwork
