= Whites Off Earth Now!! =

Studio album by Cowboy Junkies
- Released: October 2, 1986
- Recorded: June 28, 1986
- Genre: Blues, blues rock
- Length: 42:20
- Label: Latent
- Producer: Peter Moore

Cowboy Junkies chronology
Whites Off Earth Now!! (1986)	The Trinity Session (1988)

Professional ratings
Review scores
Source	Rating
AllMusic	3.5/5 stars
Encyclopedia of Popular Music	3/5 stars
Q Magazine	3/5 stars

Whites Off Earth Now!! is a 1986 studio album by Cowboy Junkies. It was the band's debut album, and is composed almost entirely of rock and blues covers. Only one song, "Take Me", is an original song by the band.

== Album development ==
The Cowboy Junkies formed as a band when Michael Timmins and Alan Anton returned to Canada from England in 1985 and started assembling a new band and a new sound. They rented a house on 547 Crawford Street in Toronto and insulated the garage to form their own rehearsal space, later referred to as Studio 547. They recruited Michael's younger brother Pete Timmins for drums and started exploring new sounds, drawing improvisation from jazz musicians Cecil Taylor, Ornette Coleman, and John Coltrane while applying the sound to the early blues of Lightnin' Hopkins, John Lee Hooker, Bukka White, and Robert Johnson. They recruited Michael's older brother John, but he left before the group coalesced. Instead, they recruited Michael's younger sister, Margo, who was working as a social worker and not interested in pursuing music and was considering going to graduate school. The musicians developed their languid tempos and whispery tones of their early works by necessity. Their rehearsal space bordered right on their neighbors, and during their first jam session, the neighbors called the police complaining about the noise. The band toned down their sound, and Margo realized that her voice was more effective when sung quiet. The musicians felt if they could get under her quiet voice, the sound was more effective. Pete started using brushes for his drum work, learning to play drums as they went. The band learned to play with less volume.

The band's first gig was in 1986 at The Rivoli, a restaurant on Toronto's Queen Street bar strip. The music was a rhythmic groove while Margo improvised melodies and sang portions of old blues songs. In the audience was Peter Moore. He states that "The very first show, people weren't paying attention to them, because they were playing so softly and quietly. Margo had her back to the audience a lot of the time". Peter Moore and the band met again later at a dinner party held by Blue Rodeo's Greg Keelor, and when they got talking about recording equipment and techniques, Moore found that his interest in single-mic recording meshed with their desire of capturing the intimate sound of their rehearsal garage. Moore had just purchased a high-end Calrec Ambisonic microphone at the wholesale price of $9,000, and would soon have it delivered. The Cowboy Junkies and Moore came together at the Crawford Street house and rehearsal space on June 26, 1986 and turned the garage into a recording studio. Moore arranged the group around his Calrec, jury-rigged a control room in the kitchen, and started recording. Except for a bad moment when the microphone got knocked on the floor, the recording session went smoothly, recording the sound on standard Betamax tapes. Moore placed a mattress in front of the drums to prevent them from over-powering the other instruments. He had Margo sing through a PA to have an electrified voice go with the electric guitars.

The Cowboy Junkies shopped their material around for a bit, but were unable to find a label to distribute their work, so they created their own indie label, Latent Recordings, to release the recording in October 1986.

== Reception ==
The Cowboy Junkies had to distribute the album themselves, but managed to sell four thousand copies, and started to develop a cult following in Toronto. Their audience continued to grow in southern Ontario, and they started getting gigs throughout southern Canada and reaching into southern US by 1987.

Whites Off Earth Now!! establishes the sparse country blues sound that took the band to international fame with their next album, 1988's The Trinity Session. Due to the success of The Trinity Session, this album has received far less critical attention over the years.

The album was released on Latent Recordings in 1986, and re-released internationally on RCA Records in 1991. Paul Davies in Q Magazine called the album "a shadow X-ray of the blues, haunting and mesmeric".

On March 27, 2007, audiophile label Mobile Fidelity reissued the album on SACD and high density vinyl.

== Track listing ==
No.	Title	Writer(s)	Length
1.	"Shining Moon"	Lightnin' Hopkins	4:09
2.	"State Trooper"	Bruce Springsteen	4:34
3.	"Me and the Devil Blues"	Robert Johnson	4:30
4.	"Decoration Day"	John Lee Hooker	3:59
5.	"Baby Please Don't Go"	Big Joe Williams	5:06
6.	"I'll Never Get Out of These Blues Alive"	John Lee Hooker	6:34
7.	"Take Me"	Michael Timmins, Margo Timmins	2:32
8.	"Forgive Me"	John Lee Hooker	5:32
9.	"Crossroads"	Robert Johnson	6:16
Total length:			42:20

== Personnel ==
Cowboy Junkies

- Margo Timmins – vocals
- Michael Timmins – guitar
- Alan Anton – bass
- Peter Timmins – drums

Production

- Peter Moore – Producer, Recorded live at Studio 547, Lacquered by
- Simon Less – Mastered by and Edited by
- George Graves – Lacquered by
- Martha Robinson – Cover layout
- Jim Cuddy – Front photos
