= Graham Henderson (Canadian lawyer) =

Canadian lawyer

Graham Henderson is a Canadian lawyer, and, since March 2021, the CEO of the London Chamber of Commerce in London, Ontario, Canada. As of 2011 his law license was suspended administratively, implying not alleged wrongdoing but rather failure to renew one’s license.

Prior to 2021, he was the president of Music Canada (formerly the Canadian Recording Industry Association), a lobby group for a number of major record labels in Canada.

Henderson also spent time working at Universal Music Canada, was a partner at the law firm of McCarthy Tetrault, and operated a boutique entertainment law firm.

He is married to Margo Timmins of Cowboy Junkies.
