= Black Eyed Man =

Studio album by Cowboy Junkies
- Released: February 11, 1992
- Recorded: Winter 1991
- Genre: Alternative country, gospel, rock
- Length: 46:06
- Label: RCA
- Producer: Michael Timmins

Cowboy Junkies chronology
The Caution Horses (1990)	Black Eyed Man (1992)	Pale Sun, Crescent Moon (1993)

Singles from Black Eyed Man
- 1. "Southern Rain" Released: 1992; 2. "A Horse in the Country" Released: 1992; 3. "Murder, Tonight, in the Trailer Park" Released: 1992; 4. "If You Were the Woman and I Was the Man" Released: 1992

Professional ratings
Review scores
Source	Rating
AllMusic	3/5 stars
The Encyclopedia of Popular Music	3/5 stars
Entertainment Weekly	C
Rolling Stone	4/5 stars
The Rolling Stone Album Guide	4/5 stars

Black Eyed Man is the fourth studio album by Cowboy Junkies, released in 1992. The album continues the band's evolution from a spare country blues style (exemplified by the 1988 album The Trinity Session) to a more mainstream country rock style.

== Album development ==
The Cowboy Junkies approach each album looking to see where they can change or improve. With Black Eyed Man Michael Timmins wanted to explore music structure, specifically time shifts and tempo shifts. Margo wanted to expand her singing style and her range. Michael states "We also wanted to approach each song individually rather than the whole album being one long song. I wanted this one to have different perspectives in each song." Another change the band made was to record the album over several months instead of in one session. They also decided to try using a new mixture of musicians, instruments, and recording personnel. The band concentrated on two or three songs at a time instead of the album as a whole. Each month they would write and arrange song ideas for the first three weeks, and then on the final week would head into the studio at Grant Avenue Studios in Hamilton, Ontario. One musical choice was to make the album diverse in its arrangements, unlike The Caution Horses. Each song would have its own unique collection of musicians. The theme to hold the album together was "the lyrical theme of love found, love lost and love betrayed - it was to be the journey of the faceless, nameless and haunted Black Eyed Man," according to Michael Timmins.

The band experimented with each track. Several musicians from previous albums showed up during the rehearsal sessions, along with about twenty five other Toronto players that were known to the band, or recruited because of their skills with instruments the band wanted to consider including in the album. Many of the songs were minimally rehearsed if at all, in an attempt to capture the freshness and spontaneity. Several musical ideas did not work, but some of the rejected attempts led the band to try different sounds and directions. One example is "Murder, Tonight, in the Trailer Park", which blended the jazz guitar sensibilities of Tony Quarington with the guitar work of Ken Mhyr to develop a song that was different than was first envisioned.

When the Cowboy Junkies were touring for The Caution Horses in 1990, they invited American singer/songwriter Townes Van Zandt to tour with them. During the tour, Van Zandt wrote "Cowboy Junkies Lament" especially for the band. Michael Timmins returned the favor, penning "Townes' Blues" as a tribute to Van Zandt. The band also cover Van Zandt's "To Live is to Fly" at the end of the album.

John Prine appears as a guest vocalist on "If You Were the Woman and I Was the Man." The band had initially asked Jimmie Dale Gilmore to duet with Margo, but although he showed up and recorded with the band, his voice was never able to mesh with Margo's.

== Track listing ==
All tracks are written by Michael Timmins except where noted.

No.	Title	Writer(s)	Length
1.	"Southern Rain"		4:49
2.	"Oregon Hill"		4:53
3.	"This Street, That Man, This Life"		3:13
4.	"A Horse in the Country"		3:48
5.	"If You Were the Woman and I Was the Man" (Duet with John Prine)		3:11
6.	"Murder, Tonight, in the Trailer Park"		4:31
7.	"Black Eyed Man"		3:14
8.	"Winter's Song"		2:57
9.	"The Last Spike"		4:22
10.	"Cowboy Junkies Lament"	Townes Van Zandt	3:06
11.	"Townes' Blues"		3:10
12.	"To Live Is to Fly"	Townes Van Zandt	4:52
Total length:			46:06

Japanese bonus tracks
No.	Title	Writer(s)	Length
13.	"Lost My Driving Wheel"	David Wiffen	6:26
14.	"If You Gotta Go, Go Now"	Bob Dylan	3:08

== Personnel ==
Cowboy Junkies

- Margo Timmins – vocals
- Michael Timmins – guitar
- Alan Anton – bass
- Peter Timmins – drums

Additional Musicians

- Dave Allen – fiddle (tracks 1, 8 & 12)
- Jeff Bird – harmonica (tracks 2, 7 & 8), mandolin (tracks 8 & 12)
- Colin Couch – tuba (track 2)
- Jaro Czerwinec – accordion (tracks 1, 2, 7 & 8)
- Bob Doidge – acoustic guitar (track 7), cello (track 8)
- The Maureen Doidge Tambourine Orkestrah – tambourine (track 2)
- Spencer Evans – piano (tracks 2 & 3), clarinet (track 5)
- David Houghton – percussion (tracks 1, 2, 3, 7, 9 & 12)
- Lewis Melville – banjo (track 9)
- Ken Myhr – lead guitar (tracks 1, 6, 7 & 11)
- John Prine – vocals (track 5)
- Tony Quarrington – lead guitar (track 6)
- Don Rook – lap steel (track 7)
- Rob Summerville – trombone (track 2)
- Tom Walsh – trombone (track 2)

Production

- Produced by Michael Timmins
- Mixed by Peter Moore, Tom Henderson
- Mastering by Peter Moore
- Engineered by Bob Doidge and John Oliveira
- Assistant Engineer – Kathy Robinson
- Art Direction by David Houghton
- Photos by Rex Miller
