= At the End of Paths Taken =

Studio album by Cowboy Junkies
- Released: April 9, 2007
- Recorded: June–November, 2006
- Genre: Alternative country
- Length: 49:15
- Labels: Latent, Zoë
- Producer: Michael Timmins

Cowboy Junkies chronology
Long Journey Home (2006)	At the End of Paths Taken (2007)	Trinity Revisited (2007)

Professional ratings
Review scores
Source	Rating
AllMusic	3.5/5 stars
Pitchfork	(3.1/10)
PopMatters	7/10 stars
Q	2/5 stars

At the End of Paths Taken is the tenth studio album by the Canadian alt-country band Cowboy Junkies, released in 2007.

== Track listing ==
All tracks are written by Michael Timmins, except where noted.

No.	Title	Writer(s)	Length
1.	"Brand New World"		5:31
2.	"Still Lost"		4:45
3.	"Cutting Board Blues"		4:05
4.	"Spiral Down"		3:33
5.	"My Little Basquiat"	Michael Timmins, Alan Anton	3:51
6.	"Someday Soon"		3:17
7.	"Follower 2"		6:18
8.	"It Doesn't Really Matter Anyway"	Michael Timmins, Alan Anton	4:42
9.	"Blue Eyed Saviour"		2:37
10.	"Mountain" (Narration by John A. Timmins)	Michael Timmins, Alan Anton	7:07
11.	"My Only Guarantee"		3:29
Total length:			49:15

== Reception ==
Per PopMatters, the album's emphasis is on family. The musicians are at the point in their lives where their time is divided between their children and their aging parents. One example of At the End of Paths Taken showcasing family is by having the Timmins' father narrate a segment from his book on "Mountain". Per No Depression, the album does not have a coherent style, with lilting ballads, junkyard clang, gloomy experimentalism, folk, and hymn-like music. Despite the disparate styles, the album is held together by the distinctive voice of Margo Timmins, and somehow the different styles feed off each other, making the album feel like a full and fated journey. Per exclaim!, the album's theme is of slowly unravelling family ties. Margo's voice continues to be the centerpiece of the sound, but on this album it is augmented by the addition of strings to make the sound even more melancholy.

== Personnel ==
Cowboy Junkies

- Margo Timmins – vocals
- Michael Timmins – guitar, backing vocals
- Alan Anton – bass, percussion, keyboards
- Peter Timmins – drums, percussion, congas

Additional musicians

- Jeff Bird – percussion, electronic mandolin
- Joby Baker – piano, keyboards, bass
- Henry Kucharczyk – digital kalimba, string arrangement & conducting
- Benjamine Bowman, Sandra Baron, Rebecca Vanderpost, Sarah Fraser-Raff – violin
- Amy Laing, Richard Armin – cello
- The Sara J. Ratzlaff / Madeleine Wiener Youth Choir – choir (track 11)
- John A.Timmins – narration (track 10) – read from his book I Don't Know Where I Am But I'm Making Good Time

Production

- Michael Timmins – producer, engineer
- Peter Moore – mastering
- Ian Bodzasi – recorded by (strings)
- Jeff Wolpert – mixing (tracks 1, 3, 4, 7, 11)
- Joby Backer – supplemental recorded by, mixing (tracks 2, 5, 6, 8 – 10)
- Matt Evees – assistant
- David Houghton – cover concept, art direction
- Alice Phieu – art direction assist, cover concept
- Angus MacPherson – cover photo
