= 200 More Miles: Live Performances 1985–1994 =

Live album by Cowboy Junkies
- Released: October 10, 1995
- Recorded: 1985–1994
- Genres: Alternative country, country rock, blues rock, folk rock
- Length: 1:43:55
- Label: RCA
- Producer: Michael Timmins

Cowboy Junkies chronology
Pale Sun, Crescent Moon (1993)	200 More Miles: Live Performances 1985–1994 (1995)	Lay It Down (1996)

Professional ratings
Review scores
Source	Rating
AllMusic	2.5/5 stars
Encyclopedia of Popular Music	4/5 stars

200 More Miles: Live Performances 1985–1994 is a 1995 album by the Canadian alt-country band Cowboy Junkies.

The album is a compilation of live performances by the band, dating from the band's earliest years as a local independent band in Toronto to their 1990s tours as international rock stars.

== Track listing ==
All tracks are written by Michael Timmins, except where noted.

Disc 1
No.	Title	Writer(s)	Length
1.	"Blue Moon Revisited (Song for Elvis)"	Michael Timmins, Margo Timmins, Richard Rodgers, Lorenz Hart	6:46
2.	"200 More Miles"		6:05
3.	"Me and the Devil Blues"	Robert Johnson	5:15
4.	"State Trooper"	Bruce Springsteen	4:07
5.	"Sun Comes Up, It's Tuesday Morning"		4:06
6.	"Oregon Hill"		4:53
7.	"Where Are You Tonight?"		5:19
8.	"Spoken Intro"		2:33
9.	"Cause Cheap Is How I Feel"		4:06
10.	"Floorboard Blues"		4:22
11.	"Murder, Tonight, in the Trailer Park"		7:37

Disc 2
No.	Title	Writer(s)	Length
12.	"Sweet Jane"	Lou Reed	3:50
13.	"If You Were the Woman and I Was the Man"		3:58
14.	"Pale Sun"		4:36
15.	"Hunted"		4:07
16.	"Lost My Driving Wheel"	David Wiffen	6:32
17.	"Forgive Me"	John Lee Hooker	7:14
18.	"Misguided Angel"	Michael Timmins, Margo Timmins	5:03
19.	"I'm So Lonesome I Could Cry"	Hank Williams	5:54
20.	"Walkin' After Midnight"	Don Hecht, Alan Block	7:32
21.	"Bad Boy" (hidden track)	Larry Williams	4:19
