= The Radio One Sessions (Cowboy Junkies album) =

Compilation album by Cowboy Junkies
- Released: July 29, 2002
- Recorded: July 3, 1989, February 27, 1992 and February 27, 1996
- Genre: Alternative country
- Length: 48:37
- Label: Strange Fruit, Latent
- Producer: Peter Watts, Pat Coupe

Cowboy Junkies chronology
Best of the Cowboy Junkies (2001)	The Radio One Sessions (2002)	Open Road (2002)

Professional ratings
Review scores
Source	Rating
AllMusic	3/5 stars
Encyclopedia of Popular Music	3/5 stars

The Radio One Sessions is a 2002 album by the Canadian alt-country band Cowboy Junkies. The compilation album was released only in Canada and the United Kingdom, and compiles tracks that the band recorded for BBC Radio One in the UK. The Radio One Sessions was released on Strange Fruit Records in the UK, and Latent Recordings in Canada.

== BBC sessions ==
The Cowboy Junkies promoted their music when touring by performing radio sessions, like most other bands. They have performed sessions by squeezing three or four bodies in DJ booths that are designed for one person, and in state of the art recording studios where there is room for several band members. Radio One is BBC's premier station for contemporary pop music, and has been hosting sessions with almost every touring band for over 40 years, setting the standard for radio sessions, hosting the like of the Beatles, Led Zeppelin, Jimi Hendrix, Cream, Captain Beefheart, and others. The Cowboy Junkies were invited to perform at Radio One on various tours when they were in the UK. Each visit to the recording studio had a different line-up of players. For their first session in 1989, only Michael and Margo Timmins from the Junkies, plus two members of their touring band, Jeff Bird and Jano Czerwinec performed, for the 1992 session, Michael, Margo, and Jeff Bird performed, and for the 1996 session, only the core members of the Cowboy Junkies were present.

== Track listing ==
All tracks are written by Michael Timmins, except where noted.

No.	Title	Writer(s)	Length
1.	"Sun Comes Up, It's Tuesday Morning"		4:00
2.	"Thirty Summers"		4:03
3.	"You Will Be Loved Again"	Mary Margaret O'Hara	3:08
4.	"Cause Cheap Is How I Feel"		4:20
5.	"Powderfinger"	Neil Young	5:21
6.	"Black Eyed Man"		3:14
7.	"The Last Spike"		4:15
8.	"Townes' Blues"		2:49
9.	"A Common Disaster"		3:51
10.	"Just Want to See"		4:24
11.	"Lonely Sinking Feeling"		4:43
12.	"Lay It Down"		4:29
Total length:			48:37

- Tracks 1 to 5 were recorded on July 3, 1989, for Saturday Sequence. Tracks 6 to 8 were recorded on February 27, 1992, for Nicky Horne. Tracks 9 to 12 were recorded on February 27, 1996, for Mark Radcliffe.

== Personnel ==
Cowboy Junkies

- Margo Timmins – vocals
- Michael Timmins – guitar, backing vocals
- Alan Anton – bass (tracks 9–12)
- Peter Timmins – drums (tracks 9–12)

Additional musicians

- Jeff Bird – harmonica (tracks 1–8), mandolin, tambourine (tracks 1–5)
- Jaro Czerwinec – accordion (tracks 1–5)

Production

- Peter Watts – producer (tracks 1–5)
- Pat Coupe – producer (tracks 9–12)
- Ted de Bono – engineer (tracks 1–5)
- Chris Lee – engineer (tracks 9–12)
