= Open Road (Cowboy Junkies album) =

Live album by Cowboy Junkies
- Released: June 25, 2002
- Recorded: 2001
- Genre: Alternative country
- Length: 59:38
- Label: Latent, Zoë

Cowboy Junkies chronology
The Radio One Sessions (2002)	Open Road (2002)	Platinum & Gold Collection (2003)

Professional ratings
Review scores
Source	Rating
AllMusic	3.5/5 stars

Open Road is a DVD release by the Canadian band Cowboy Junkies, with a bonus CD. It is a four-hour DVD/CD documentary of performances from 2001.

== Track listing ==
=== DVD ===
Cowboy Junkies Live from the Quebec City Summer Festival

All tracks are written by Michael Timmins, except where noted.

No.	Title	Writer(s)	Length
1.	"Lay It Down"
2.	"Hard to Explain"
3.	"Bread and Wine River Song Trilogy"
4.	"River Waltz"
5.	"Bea's Song"
6.	"Dragging Hooks"	Michael Timmins, Alan Anton, Peter Timmins
7.	"Blue Moon Revisited (Song for Elvis)"	Michael Timmins, Margo Timmins, Richard Rodgers, Lorenz Hart
8.	"Anniversary Song"
Total length:			47:00

A Documentary in Music, Ones and Zeroes

No.	Title	Length
9.	"A Documentary in Music, Ones and Zeroes" (A Behind the Scenes Look At the Open Road Tour with Video, Stills and Music)	55:00

Margo and Michael Timmins Live from the Temple

All tracks are written by Michael Timmins, except where noted.

No.	Title	Writer(s)	Length
10.	"Anniversary Song"
11.	"Sun Comes Up, It's Tuesday Morning"
12.	"Misguided Angel"
13.	"I'm So Open"	Michael Timmins, Alan Anton, Peter Timmins
14.	"Small Swift Birds"
15.	"Thousand Year Prayer"
16.	"Hollow As a Bone"
Total length:			30:00

An Open Conversation with Margo and Michael Timmins

No.	Title	Length
17.	"An Open Conversation with Margo and Michael Timmins" (Margo and Michael Discuss the Writing and Recording of Open and Perform a Few Songs from the Album)	35:00

- Total DVD length is 2hrs, 47min

=== CD ===
All tracks are written by Michael Timmins, except where noted.

No.	Title	Writer(s)	Length
1.	"Murder, Tonight, In the Trailer Park"		6:27
2.	"Lay It Down"		10:48
3.	"This Street, That Man, This Life"		3:42
4.	"Thousand Year Prayer"		4:24
5.	"Bread and Wine"		5:22
6.	"Witches"	Michael Timmins, Margo Timmins	3:33
7.	"Something More Besides You"		4:00
8.	"Escape Is So Simple"		4:09
9.	"Dragging Hooks"	Michael Timmins, Alan Anton, Peter Timmins	12:00
10.	"Anniversary Song"		5:13
Total length:			59:38
