= Long Journey Home (Live in Liverpool) =

Live album by Cowboy Junkies
- Released: October 24, 2006
- Recorded: October 7, 2004
- Genre: Alternative country, country rock, folk rock
- Length: 1:10:41
- Label: Zoë (CD), Latent (DVD)
- Producer: Katrina Aust, Tom Grimshaw

Cowboy Junkies chronology
Early 21st Century Blues (2005)	Long Journey Home (Live in Liverpool) (2006)	At the End of Paths Taken (2007)

Long Journey Home (Live in Liverpool) is an album by the Canadian alt-country band Cowboy Junkies, recorded in Liverpool, England in 2004 and released in 2006. The release includes a concert DVD along with a CD. Only 11 tracks of the 18 that are on the DVD appear on the CD.

== Track listing ==
CD

All tracks are written by Michael Timmins, except where noted.

No.	Title	Writer(s)	Length
1.	"32-20 Blues"	Robert Johnson	13:58
2.	"Cause Cheap Is How I Feel"		4:20
3.	"Pale Sun"		7:12
4.	"He Will Call You Baby"		6:34
5.	"A Horse in the Country"		4:06
6.	"The Slide"		3:31
7.	"I Don't Get It"		4:02
8.	"Good Friday"		5:04
9.	"Helpless"	Neil Young	6:11
10.	"Misguided Angel"	Michael Timmins, Margo Timmins	5:29
11.	"Sweet Jane"	Lou Reed	10:14
Total length:			1:10:41

DVD

All tracks are written by Michael Timmins, except where noted.

No.	Title	Writer(s)	Length
1.	"Sweet Jane"	Lou Reed	8:26
2.	"Cause Cheap Is How I Feel"		6:18
3.	"200 More Miles"		5:22
4.	"Why This One"		4:31
5.	"Pale Sun"		7:15
6.	"He Will Call You Baby"		8:36
7.	"Sun Comes Up It's Tuesday Morning"		3:52
8.	"32-20 Blues"	Robert Johnson	14:39
9.	"Black Eyed Man"		3:42
10.	"1000 Year Prayer"		5:23
11.	"A Horse in the Country"		4:16
12.	"Notes Falling Slow"		7:23
13.	"The Slide"		4:37
14.	"I Don't Get It"		4:03
15.	"Good Friday"		9:53
16.	"Helpless"	Neil Young	8:15
17.	"Isn't It a Pity"	George Harrison	6:31
18.	"Misguided Angel"	Michael Timmins, Margo Timmins	6:49
Total length:			1:59:51

DVD bonus features

- Interview with Mike Timmins and Margo Timmins
- Interview with Jaro Czerwinec and Jeff Bird
- Interview with Alan Anton and Peter Timmins
- Soundcheck and behind-the-scenes footage
