= Latent Recordings =

Canadian record label

- Parent company: Cowboy Junkies
- Founded: 1981
- Founder: Michael Timmins; Alan Anton; Geoff Railton; Brett Wickens
- Distributor(s): MapleMusic (Canada); Zoë (U.S.); Strange Fruit (international)
- Genre: Rock, alternative rock
- Country of origin: Toronto, Ontario, Canada
- Official website: http://www.latentrecordings.com/

Latent Recordings is a Canadian independent record label founded in 1981. It was dormant in the 1990s while the Cowboy Junkies were signed to American labels, but began to release independently produced albums in the 2000s. By the late 2000s, it sold downloads and CDs online.

== History ==
The label was formed in London by Michael Timmins, Alan Anton, Geoff Railton, and Brett Wickens to produce and distribute their music. After their first three releases, they returned to Canada, where Timmins and Anton formed Cowboy Junkies with Timmins' siblings Margo and Peter.

In Toronto, the label distributed Cowboy Junkies' first two albums before the band signed with RCA, which re-released The Trinity Session internationally. For the next few years the label's releases were sporadic offerings produced by Michael Timmins and/or Peter Moore.

After Cowboy Junkies was released from their record contract—by then with Geffen Records— following their 1998 album Miles from Our Home, they revived Latent Recordings and have released their subsequent albums on that label in Canada. The records have been licensed to other independent labels, such as Zoë Records in the United States and Strange Fruit Records in the UK, for international release.

In recent years, the label has again become active in releasing work by other artists as well, including Ivy Mairi, Finlayson/Maize, Jerry Leger, Lee Harvey Osmond and Huron.

== Catalogue ==
Most of Latent Recordings releases have been numbered, with the number preceded by "LATEX" (#s 1–5, V14), or "LATEX CD" (#s >5).

#	Album title	Artist	Recorded
1	Germinal 1 (chrome cassette)	Germinal	1983 Aug.
2	DIN (LP)	Germinal	1984
3	Hunger Project (LP)	Hunger Project	1984 Nov.
4	Whites Off Earth Now!! (LP)	Cowboy Junkies	1986 Oct.
5	The Trinity Session (LP)	Cowboy Junkies	1988 Nov.
CD6	Tell Your Friends There's Friends Around	The Corndogs	1989 Apr.
CD7	Stone Boat	Pat Temple and the High Lonesome Players	1990
CD8	Library of the Sun	John Bottomley	1990
CD9	What the Hell is Going On?	The Corndogs	1991
CD10	Connecting Lines	Pat Temple and the High Lonesome Players	1991 Jan.
CD11	Rarities, B-Sides and Slow, Sad Waltzes	Cowboy Junkies	1999 Oct.
CD12	Rabbit (2-disc)	The Corndogs	2000 May
CD13	Waltz Across America	Cowboy Junkies	2000 Oct.
CD14	The Radio One Sessions	Cowboy Junkies	2002 July
V14	Live in Toronto (VHS)	Cowboy Junkies	2000 Oct.
CD15	Open	Cowboy Junkies	2001 May
DVD15	Open Road (DVD/CD)	Cowboy Junkies	2002 June
CD16	In the Time Before Llamas	Cowboy Junkies	2003 Nov.
CD17	One Soul Now	Cowboy Junkies	2004 June
CD18	Early 21st Century Blues	Cowboy Junkies	2005 May
DVD19	Long Journey Home	Cowboy Junkies	2005
CD20	At the End of Paths Taken	Cowboy Junkies	2007 Apr.
CD21	Well You	Ivy Mairi	2007 Apr.
DVD22	Trinity Revisited (DVD)	Cowboy Junkies	2007 Oct.
CD23	City of Sirens	Skydiggers	2008 Jun.
CD24	A Quiet Evil	Lee Harvey Osmond	2010 Mar.
CD25	Acoustic Junk	Cowboy Junkies	2009
CD26	Huron	Huron	2010
CD27	The History of Forgetting	Andy Maize	2010 June
CD28	Renmin Park (The Nomad Series Vol. 1)	Cowboy Junkies	2010 June
CD29	Demons (The Nomad Series Vol. 2)	Cowboy Junkies	2011 Feb.
CD30	Trail of Smoke	Cootes Leland	2011 Aug.
CD31	Sing in My Meadow (The Nomad Series Vol. 3)	Cowboy Junkies	2011 Oct.
CD32	No Talker	Ivy Mairi	2011 Sept.
CD33	The Wilderness (The Nomad Series Vol. 4)	Cowboy Junkies	2012 Mar.
CD34	The Nomad Series	Cowboy Junkies	2012 Apr.
CD35	Northern Shore	Skydiggers	2012 Apr.
CD36	Northern Shore (Deluxe box set)	Skydiggers	2012 Apr.
CD37	The Folk Sinner	Lee Harvey Osmond	2013 Jan.
CD38	Legion	The Potion Kings	2013 Feb.
CD39	The Good Family Album	The Good Family	2013 Apr.
CD40	All of our Dreaming: Skydiggers Live, 1988, 2000 & 2012	Skydiggers	2013 Mar.
CD41	No. 1 Northern	Skydiggers	2013 July
CD42	The Kennedy Suite	Various artists	2013 Nov.
CD43	She Comes into the Room	Skydiggers	2013 Oct.
CD44	Angels (EP)	Skydiggers	2013
CD45	Early Riser	Jerry Leger	2014 Apr.
CD46	Angels (album)	Skydiggers	2014 Nov.
CD47	Beautiful Scars	Lee Harvey Osmond	2015 Apr.
CD48	Notes Falling Slow	Cowboy Junkies	2015 Oct.
CD49	Here Without You (The Songs of Gene Clark)	Skydiggers	2016 May
CD50/LP50	Lamps	HarpAcash & the Morals	2016 Sept.
CD51/LP51	Nonsense and Heartache	Jerry Leger	2017 Mar.
CD52	A Short History of Decay	John Murry	2017 July
CD53/LP53	Warmth of the Sun	Skydiggers	2017 Oct.
Di54	Live from Latent Lounge (Digital only)	Lee Harvey Osmond	2017 Nov.
CD55/LP55	All That Reckoning	Cowboy Junkies	2018 July
CD56/LP56	Major Love	Major Love	2018 Aug.
CD57/LP57	Mohawk	Lee Harvey Osmond	2019 Jan.
CD58/LP58	Time Out for Tomorrow	Jerry Leger	2019 Nov.
LP59	All That Reckoning / Ghosts	Cowboy Junkies	2021 Mar.
CD63/LP63	Songs of the Recollection	Cowboy Junkies	2022 Mar.
CD65/LP65	Nothing Pressing	Jerry Leger	2022 Mar.
LP66	Such Ferocious Beauty	Cowboy Junkies	2023 Jun.
CD72/LP72	Donlands	Jerry Leger	2023 Oct.

- Hunger Project: Alan Anton (guitar), Geoff Railton (drums), Michael Timmins (guitar), & English born Liza Dawson-Whisker (vocals)
- Germinal: Alan Anton (bass), Geoff Railton (drums), Michael Timmins (guitar), & Richard O’Callaghan (soprano and tenor saxophone)
- Cowboy Junkies: Alan Anton (bass), Michael Timmins (guitar), Peter Timmins (drums), & Margo Timmins (vocals)
- The Corndogs: Brodie Lodge (drums, guitar, voice), & Greg Clarke (guitar, bass, voice). Produced by Peter Moore and Michael Timmins
- Pat Temple and the High Lonesome Players ."Canadian Artists". New World Records. Produced by Michael Timmins

== See also ==
- Lists of record labels
