= Ray Agee =

American singer-songwriter

- Born: Raymond Clinton Agee; April 10, 1921; Dixons Mills, Alabama, United States
- Died: April 15, 1989 (aged 68) Los Angeles, California
- Genres: Blues, R&B
- Occupation(s): Singer, songwriter
- Instrument: Vocals
- Years active: Late 1940s–mid-1970s
- Labels: R.K., Modern, Aladdin, Elko, Spark, Ebb, Shirley, Celeste, Soultown, Jewel, Krafton, White Enterprises

Raymond Clinton "Ray" Agee (April 10, 1921 – April 15, 1989) was an American blues and R&B singer and songwriter who recorded over a hundred tracks between the early 1950s and mid-1970s, and is described at AllMusic as "a fine, versatile blues singer whose work deserves a wider audience".

== Biography ==
Agee was born in Dixons Mills, Alabama, in 1921 according to most official records, though some sources give 1930. He was the eighth child out of 17 in the family. By the age of four, he developed polio, which left him with a permanent disability. He moved to Los Angeles with his parents and family in the 1930s, and with his brothers formed a gospel singing group, the Agee Brothers, who performed in local churches.

By the early 1950s, Agee had started performing secular R&B music, often in the relaxed style of Charles Brown. He made his first recordings as vocalist with the Richard Brown Orchestra, on the R.K. label, in 1952. He recorded in the early and mid-1950s for a variety of labels in Los Angeles, including Modern, Aladdin, Elko, Spark and Ebb, with musicians including Maxwell Davis and Chuck Norris.

In 1960 he recorded with guitarist Johnny Heartsman on Shirley Records, one of his best-remembered tracks being a version of "Tin Pan Alley", a song written by Bob Geddins and first recorded in 1953 by Jimmy Wilson. Most of Agee's songs were self-written. As a writer, his songs included "I've Been Wrong So Long", recorded by Bobby Bland in 1960; "I Say I Love You", co-written with Johnny Otis and recorded by Johnny "Guitar" Watson in 1963; "Let's Talk About Love", a song recorded by Agee in 1963 which became the title track of Lurrie Bell's 2007 album; and "It's Hard To Explain", recorded by Agee in 1971 and by Cowboy Junkies on their 1993 album Pale Sun, Crescent Moon.

Agee continued to record prolifically through the 1960s, for small labels including Shirley, Celeste, Soultown, Jewel, and Krafton, but with little recognition outside his local area. His only LP, Love Is A Gamble, was issued on the White Enterprises label in 1971. His last recordings were released soon afterwards.

Two compilations of his recordings, Black Night Is Gone (1984), and I'm Not Looking Back (1985) were released in Sweden by Mr. R & B Records. A new CD compilation An Introduction to the Blues of Ray Agee: Another Fool Sings the Blues was released in 2023 on Jasmine Records.

Agee died in Los Angeles in 1989.
