= Open (Cowboy Junkies album) =

Studio album by Cowboy Junkies
- Released: May 15, 2001
- Recorded: December 1999 – December 2000
- Genre: Alternative country, rock, blues
- Length: 49:20
- Label: Latent, Zoë
- Producer: Michael Timmins

Cowboy Junkies chronology
Waltz Across America (2000)	Open (2001)	Best of the Cowboy Junkies (2001)

Professional ratings
Review scores
Source	Rating
AllMusic	3/5 stars
Encyclopedia of Popular Music	4/5 stars
Pitchfork	7.4 stars on a 10 point scale

Open is an album by the Canadian band Cowboy Junkies, released in 2001. It was the band's third independent release after the end of their contract with Geffen Records, and the first of those to feature new material. The album was released on Latent Recordings in Canada, and on Zoë Records internationally.

== Album development ==
While the Cowboy Junkies were touring to support their live album Waltz Across America, they began working on new material for what would become Open. The Waltz Across America tour lasted nine months, with many breaks in the schedule. During the breaks, sometimes Michael Timmins retreated to his hide-a-way to work on new song material. The band would then add two to three new songs a month into their performances, allowing them to evolve on stage. During other breaks, the Cowboy Junkies would go to sound engineer Daryl Smith's studio, Chemical Sound, to live record the material they had created that month. The band had worked in several studios that were sterile and impersonal, and always were on the look-out for a comfortable studio they could relax in, especially one where they could set up the whole band. The Junkies had discovered Chemical when they contributed a song for a Gram Parsons tribute album, and they returned there to record "Highway Kind" for a Townes Van Zandt tribute album. They found they could set up in a couple hours, record some tracks, and be done by the end of the day, which took away the pressure of trying to complete the songs in a set recording period. Each visit to the studio, the band would record two or three songs at most, and they took the opportunity to re-record songs later as needed. After the band had recorded about fifteen tracks, they listened to their material, and decided they had the songs for their next album.

Not all the songs were recorded in Chemical. Two of the songs were recorded at Peter Moore's home studio. Those two songs required a greater amount of technical control, which is why the Cowboy Junkies turned to Moore. When the band had captured all the tracks for the album, they edited and sequenced the tracks into a cohesive whole, starting very dark with "I Did It All for You", rising throughout the album to end with a glimmer of hope with "Close My Eyes", only to bring back some of the dark with a reprise of the opening feedback.

The title of the album, Open, has dual meanings. One meaning is being open in a way that is dangerous, and the other meaning is the beneficial idea of open arms, open smile. Perennial art director David Houghton used an image of a venus flytrap to express both meanings. The plant is wide open, ready to catch its prey, being both open and threatening. The Cowboy Junkies also explore, defining and re-defining the meaning of open through their music.

== Track listing ==
All tracks are written by Michael Timmins, except where noted

No.	Title	Writer(s)	Length
1.	"I Did It All for You"		5:07
2.	"Dragging Hooks (River Song Trilogy: Part III)"	Michael Timmins, Alan Anton, Peter Timmins	7:49
3.	"Bread and Wine"		4:36
4.	"Upon Still Waters"		3:23
5.	"Dark Hole Again"		7:43
6.	"Thousand Year Prayer"		4:17
7.	"I'm So Open"	Michael Timmins, Alan Anton, Peter Timmins	4:10
8.	"Small Swift Birds"		3:47
9.	"Beneath the Gate"		4:08
10.	"Close My Eyes"		4:20
Total length:			49:20

Japanese bonus tracks
No.	Title	Writer(s)	Length
11.	"Blue Guitar" (Live)	Michael Timmins, Townes Van Zandt	11:09
12.	"Hollow as a Bone (Revisited)" (Live)		3:43
13.	"Dark Hole Again" (Live)		6:39

== Personnel ==
Cowboy Junkies

- Margo Timmins – vocals
- Michael Timmins – guitar
- Alan Anton – bass
- Peter Timmins – drums

Additional musicians

- Jeff Bird – 8-string bass, harmonica, mandolin, electronic mandolin, percussion
- Karin Bergquist – background vocals
- Linford Detweiler – organ, piano, wurlitzer

Production

- Michael Timmins – producer, engineer, mixing
- Peter Moore – engineer, mastering, mixing
- James Heidebricht – engineer (track 2), assistant engineer
- Rudy Rempel – assistant engineer
- Daryl Smith – engineer, mixing
- David Houghton – art director
