= In the Time Before Llamas =

Live album by Cowboy Junkies
- Released: November 18, 2003
- Recorded: May 1, 1990; March 6, 1992
- Genre: Alternative country
- Length: 1:17:50
- Label: Strange Fruit
- Producer: Anthony Pugh, Mark Radcliffe, Pete Ritzema

Cowboy Junkies chronology
Platinum & Gold Collection (2003)	In the Time Before Llamas (2003)	One Soul Now (2004)

Professional ratings
Review scores
Source	Rating
Encyclopedia of Popular Music	3/5 stars

In the Time Before Llamas is an album by the Canadian alt-country band Cowboy Junkies, released in 2003. It is a live album, compiling tracks from two concerts in the United Kingdom. It was released only in the UK, where the 2000 live album Waltz Across America was not released, but is available as an import in other countries.

== Track listing ==
All tracks are written by Michael Timmins, except where noted

No.	Title	Writer(s)	Length
1.	"You Will Be Loved Again"	Mary Margaret O'Hara	3:39
2.	"Thirty Summers"		4:09
3.	"Blue Moon Revisited (Song for Elvis)"	Michael Timmins, Margo Timmins, Richard Rodgers, Lorenz Hart	5:44
4.	"Cause Cheap is How I Feel"		4:13
5.	"200 More Miles"		5:43
6.	"Me and the Devil Blues"	Robert Johnson	5:12
7.	"Whalers/Mariner's Song"	traditional	7:10
8.	"Sun Comes Up, It's Tuesday Morning"		3:59
9.	"Five Room Love Story"		5:30
10.	"Sweet Jane"	Lou Reed	3:34
11.	"To Love is to Bury"	Margo Timmins	4:27
12.	"Southern Rain"		5:02
13.	"Townes' Blues"		3:56
14.	"If You Gotta Go, Go Now"	Bob Dylan	2:52
15.	"Black Eyed Man"		3:16
16.	"Murder, Tonight, in the Trailer Park"		5:07
17.	"Hot Burrito No. 1"	Gram Parsons, Chris Ethridge	4:17
Total length:			1:17:50

- Tracks 1–11 were recorded at the Royal Exchange Theatre in Manchester on May 1, 1990. Tracks 12–17 were recorded at the Royal Albert Hall in London on March 6, 1992.
