= Pale Sun, Crescent Moon =

Studio album by Cowboy Junkies
- Released: November 23, 1993
- Recorded: April 1993
- Genres: Country rock, blues rock
- Length: 45:00
- Labels: RCA, BMG
- Producer: Michael Timmins

Cowboy Junkies chronology
| Black Eyed Man (1992) | Pale Sun, Crescent Moon (1993) | 200 More Miles: Live Performances 1985–1994 (1995) |

Singles from Pale Sun, Crescent Moon
- 1. "Hard to Explain" Released: 1993; 2. "Anniversary Song" Released: 1994

Professional ratings
Review scores
| Source | Rating |
|---|---|
| AllMusic | 4.5/5 stars |
| The Encyclopedia of Popular Music | 4/5 stars |

Pale Sun, Crescent Moon is the fifth studio album by Canadian country rock band Cowboy Junkies, released in 1993. It was the band's last album of new material for RCA Records, although a live album and a greatest hits compilation were subsequently released on the label. Canadian guitarist Ken Myhr appears on every track on this album.

== Album development ==
The Cowboy Junkies created the album within months of getting off the road from the Black Eyed Man tour. While touring, Michael Timmins started work on several new songs, and after getting home he cleaned up and finished the tracks. Ken Myhr, who had been on the last tour with the band, was invited to join the band in working out arrangements for the songs. In April over the Easter weekend, the four band members and Ken went to Studio 306 in Toronto, operated by Bob Cobban, to record the basic tracks in three very long sessions. The band had previously worked with Cobban at Studio 306 when recording "Lost My Driving Wheel". After the initial sessions, the band started working on the overdub sessions, which were spread out over the next few weeks. In this cycle, Michael Timmins and Myhr added more guitar, Margo added some harmonies, Jeff Bird added embellishments, and Richard Bell added a keyboard. Richard Bell had been in the industry for a while, working with The Band, Big Brother and the Holding Company, and can be heard on Janis Joplin's album Pearl. He added a classic style of rock with his piano and organ work during the recording sessions. The album from conception to final mixing is one of the quickest the band created. One goal with the album was to raise the volume a bit from the Junkies' earlier albums. With every album, they try to add a different element, and for this album, they opened the album with a power chord.

Pale Sun, Crescent Moon is about male–female relationships. The track show different faces of relationships, showcasing mystical with "Crescent Moon", reality with "First Recollection" and "Ring on the Sill", romantic with "Anniversary Song" and "White Sail", investigates dark corners with "Seven Years", "Pale Sun", and "The Post", moves on to metaphysical with "Cold Tea Blues", delves into the unexplainable with "Hard to Explain" and "Hunted", and finally ends with a song showcasing the distrust between one man and one woman in "Floorboard Blues". Margo Timmins describes the theme of the album "is that there is love and there is all that conspires to steal love away."

== Track listing ==
All tracks are written by Michael Timmins except where noted.

| No. | Title | Writer(s) | Length |
|---|---|---|---|
| 1. | "Crescent Moon" | | 5:02 |
| 2. | "First Recollection" | | 4:16 |
| 3. | "Ring on the Sill" | | 4:22 |
| 4. | "Anniversary Song" | | 3:11 |
| 5. | "White Sail" | | 3:45 |
| 6. | "Seven Years" | | 4:54 |
| 7. | "Pale Sun" | | 3:39 |
| 8. | "The Post" | J Mascis | 4:40 |
| 9. | "Cold Tea Blues" | | 2:47 |
| 10. | "Hard to Explain" | Ray Agee | 4:37 |
| 11. | "Hunted" | | 4:03 |
| 12. | "Floorboard Blues" | | 2:04 |
| Total length: | | | 45:00 |

== Personnel ==
Cowboy Junkies

- Margo Timmins – vocals
- Michael Timmins – guitar
- Alan Anton – bass
- Peter Timmins – drums

Additional Musicians

- Jeff Bird – harmonica, mandolin, 8-string bass, percussion
- Ken Myhr – lead guitar
- Richard Bell – piano, organ

Production

- Michael Timmins – producer
- Bob Ludwig – mastered
- Robert Cobban – engineer, mixed by
- Colin Caddies – assistant engineer
- Open Circle Design – design
- David Houghton – art direction
- Juan Sánchez Cotán – cover illustration
