= Waltz Across America =

Live album by Cowboy Junkies
- Released: October 2000
- Genre: Alternative country
- Length: 1:04:55
- Label: Latent
- Producer: Michael Timmins

Cowboy Junkies chronology
| Rarities, B-Sides and Slow, Sad Waltzes (1999) | Waltz Across America (2000) | Open (2001) |

Professional ratings
Review scores
| Source | Rating |
|---|---|
| AllMusic | 3/5 stars |
| Encyclopedia of Popular Music | 3/5 stars |

Waltz Across America is a 2000 album by the Canadian alt-country band Cowboy Junkies.

A live album, it was released on the band's independent label, Latent Recordings. Unlike most of the band's albums, it was not released in the United Kingdom. Another live album, In the Time Before Llamas, was released there in 2003.

== Track listing ==
All tracks are written by Michael Timmins, except where noted.

| No. | Title | Writer(s) | Length |
|---|---|---|---|
| 1. | "Good Friday" | Michael Timmins, Margo Timmins, Richard Rodgers, Lorenz Hart | 5:20 |
| 2. | "Southern Rain" | | 5:30 |
| 3. | "Bea's Song (River Song Trilogy, Part II)" | | 4:05 |
| 4. | "Townes' Blues" | | 3:40 |
| 5. | "Five Room Love Story" | | 5:25 |
| 6. | "I Saw Your Shoes" | | 4:15 |
| 7. | "Misguided Angel" | Michael Timmins, Margo Timmins | 4:55 |
| 8. | "Sweet Jane" | Lou Reed | 5:45 |
| 9. | "Hunted" | | 5:30 |
| 10. | "Blue Guitar" | Michael Timmins, Townes Van Zandt | 11:00 |
| 11. | "Hollow as a Bone (Revisited)" (encore) | | 3:45 |
| 12. | "Dark Hole Again" (encore) | | 5:45 |
| Total length: | | | 1:04:55 |

== Personnel ==
Cowboy Junkies

- Margo Timmins – vocals
- Michael Timmins – guitar
- Alan Anton – bass
- Peter Timmins – drums

Additional musicians

- Jeff Bird – mandolin, electric mandolin, harmonica, 8 string bass, melodica, percussion
- Linford Detweiler – piano, Hammond B3 organ
- Karin Bergquist – backup vocals, acoustic guitar
