= The Trinity Session =

Studio album by Cowboy Junkies
- Released: November 15, 1988
- Recorded: November 27, 1987
- Studio: Church of the Holy Trinity (Toronto)
- Genre: Alternative country; country rock; folk blues
- Length: 52:36
- Label: Latent; RCA
- Producer: Peter Moore

Cowboy Junkies chronology
Whites Off Earth Now!! (1986)	The Trinity Session (1988)	The Caution Horses (1990)

Singles from The Trinity Session
- 1. "Sweet Jane" Released: 1989; 2. "Misguided Angel" Released: 1989; 3. "Blue Moon Revisited" Released: 1989

Professional ratings
Review scores
Source	Rating
AllMusic	4.5/5 stars
Chicago Sun-Times	3.5/4 stars
NME	8/10
Orlando Sentinel	5/5 stars
The Philadelphia Inquirer	4/4 stars
Record Mirror	4/5
Rolling Stone	4/5 stars
The Rolling Stone Album Guide	4/5 stars
Spin Alternative Record Guide	8/10
The Village Voice	C+

The Trinity Session is the second studio album by Canadian alternative country band Cowboy Junkies, released in early 1988 by Latent Recordings in Canada, and re-released worldwide later in the year on RCA Records.

The music was recorded inside Toronto's Church of the Holy Trinity on November 27, 1987, with the band circled around a single microphone. The album includes a mixture of original material by the band and covers of classic folk, rock and country songs. Notable among the songs is the band's most famous single, a cover of the Velvet Underground's "Sweet Jane", based on the version found on 1969: The Velvet Underground Live (1974) rather than the later studio version from Loaded (1970). Also included is "Blue Moon Revisited (Song for Elvis)", which is both a cover and an original, combining a new song by the band with the pop standard "Blue Moon".

In 2007, the album was performed live in its entirety as part of the All Tomorrow's Parties' Don't Look Back series. Also that year, the band returned to the Church of the Holy Trinity to record a new version of the Trinity Session with guest musicians Natalie Merchant, Vic Chesnutt and Ryan Adams. This new set of recordings was released as Trinity Revisited to commemorate the 20th anniversary of The Trinity Session.

== The recording sessions ==
According to the band's website, the direction of The Trinity Session was influenced by music they had heard while touring the southern United States in support of their debut studio album Whites Off Earth Now!! (1986). The album's lyrics and instrumentation were lifted from the classic country groups to which the band was exposed, and the song "200 More Miles" was written in reference to the band's life on the road.

As they had done on Whites, Cowboy Junkies wanted to record live with one stereo microphone direct to tape. Although it is stated on the album cover that the recording was made on two-track R-DAT, according to recording engineer Peter J. Moore, it was actually recorded on a Sony Betamax SL-2000 video cassette deck connected to a Sony PCM-F1 analog/digital converter, using one single Calrec ambisonic microphone.

Moore suggested the Church of the Holy Trinity in Toronto for its natural reverb. To better persuade the officials of the historic church, the band claimed to be the Timmins Family Singers and said they were recording a Christmas special for radio. The session began on the morning of November 27, 1987. The group first recorded the songs with the fewest instruments and then the songs with gradually more complex arrangements. In this way, Moore and the band were able to solve acoustic problems one by one. To better balance Margo Timmins' vocals against the electric guitars and drums, she was recorded through a PA system that had been left behind by a previous group. By making subtle changes in volume and placement relative to the microphone over six hours, Moore and the band had finally reached the distinctive sound of the album by the time the last of the guest musicians arrived at the church.

The band was unable to rehearse with most of the guest musicians before the day of the session. Considering the method of recording and time constraints, this could have been disastrous for the songs that required seven or more musicians, but after paying a security guard $25 for an extra two hours of recording time, the band was able to finish, recording the final song of the session, "Misguided Angel", in a single take.

Contrary to popular myth, the album was not entirely recorded in one day. In the hustle of the first recording session, the band did not have time to record Margo Timmins' a cappella chanting on "Mining for Gold". She and Moore recorded the song a few days later during the Toronto Symphony Orchestra's lunch break.

Sleeve notes state that the recording was not mixed, overdubbed or edited in any way.

The band followed this recording with a three-day session in April 1989 at a Quaker meeting house, but decided against releasing those songs until 2022, when they put out Sharon – The Lost Album.

"Working on a Building" and "Blue Moon Revisited (Song for Elvis)" did not appear on the Latent Records release. "Blue Moon Revisited" was originally released on It Came from Canada, Vol. 4 (1988), a compilation of Canadian independent bands.

== Accolades ==
In 2000, it was ranked number 999 in the third edition of the book All Time Top 1000 Albums. It was listed as the 42nd best album of the 1980s by Pitchfork in 2002. In Bob Mersereau's 2007 book The Top 100 Canadian Albums, The Trinity Session was included at number 62. In 2015, the album was named the winner in the 1980s category of the inaugural Slaight Family Polaris Heritage Prize, an annual Canadian music award for classic albums released prior to the creation of the Polaris Music Prize. It was also included in the book 1001 Albums You Must Hear Before You Die (2005).

== Track listing ==
No.	Title	Writer(s)	Length
1.	"Mining for Gold"	Traditional, arranged by James Gordon	1:34
2.	"Misguided Angel"	Margo Timmins; Michael Timmins	4:58
3.	"Blue Moon Revisited (Song for Elvis)" (not included on the original vinyl release)	Margo Timmins; Michael Timmins; Richard Rodgers; Lorenz Hart	4:31
4.	"I Don't Get It"	Margo Timmins; Michael Timmins	4:34
5.	"I'm So Lonesome I Could Cry"	Hank Williams	5:24
6.	"To Love Is to Bury"	Margo Timmins; Michael Timmins	4:47
7.	"200 More Miles"	Michael Timmins	5:29
8.	"Dreaming My Dreams with You"	Allen Reynolds	4:28
9.	"Working on a Building" (not included on the original vinyl release)	Traditional	3:48
10.	"Sweet Jane"	Lou Reed	3:41
11.	"Postcard Blues"	Michael Timmins	3:28
12.	"Walkin' After Midnight"	Don Hecht; Alan Block	5:54
Total length:			52:36

== Personnel ==
Cowboy Junkies

- Margo Timmins – lead vocals
- Michael Timmins – guitar
- Alan Anton – bass
- Peter Timmins – drums

Additional musicians

- John Timmins – guitar, backing vocals
- Kim Deschamps – pedal steel guitar, dobro, bottleneck slide guitar
- Jeff Bird – fiddle, harmonica, mandolin
- Steve Shearer – harmonica
- Jaro Czerwinec – accordion

Technical personnel

- Peter Moore – producer, mixing engineer, mastering engineer

== Chart performance ==
Chart (1988)	Peak position
Canadian RPM Top Albums	28
Canadian RPM Country Albums	30
U.S. Billboard 200	26

== Sales certifications ==
Organization	Level	Date
CRIA – Canada	Gold	March 31, 1989
RIAA – U.S.	Gold	July 19, 1989
CRIA – Canada	Platinum	September 27, 1989
RIAA – U.S.	Platinum	March 15, 1996
CRIA – Canada	2× Platinum	March 13, 1996

== Other media ==
- "Blue Moon Revisited" is heard in the background in the bar scene near the end of the 2004 film Silver City.
- The album's version of Lou Reed's "Sweet Jane" is featured on the soundtrack of Oliver Stone's 1994 movie Natural Born Killers.
