= Cowboy Junkies =

Canadian band

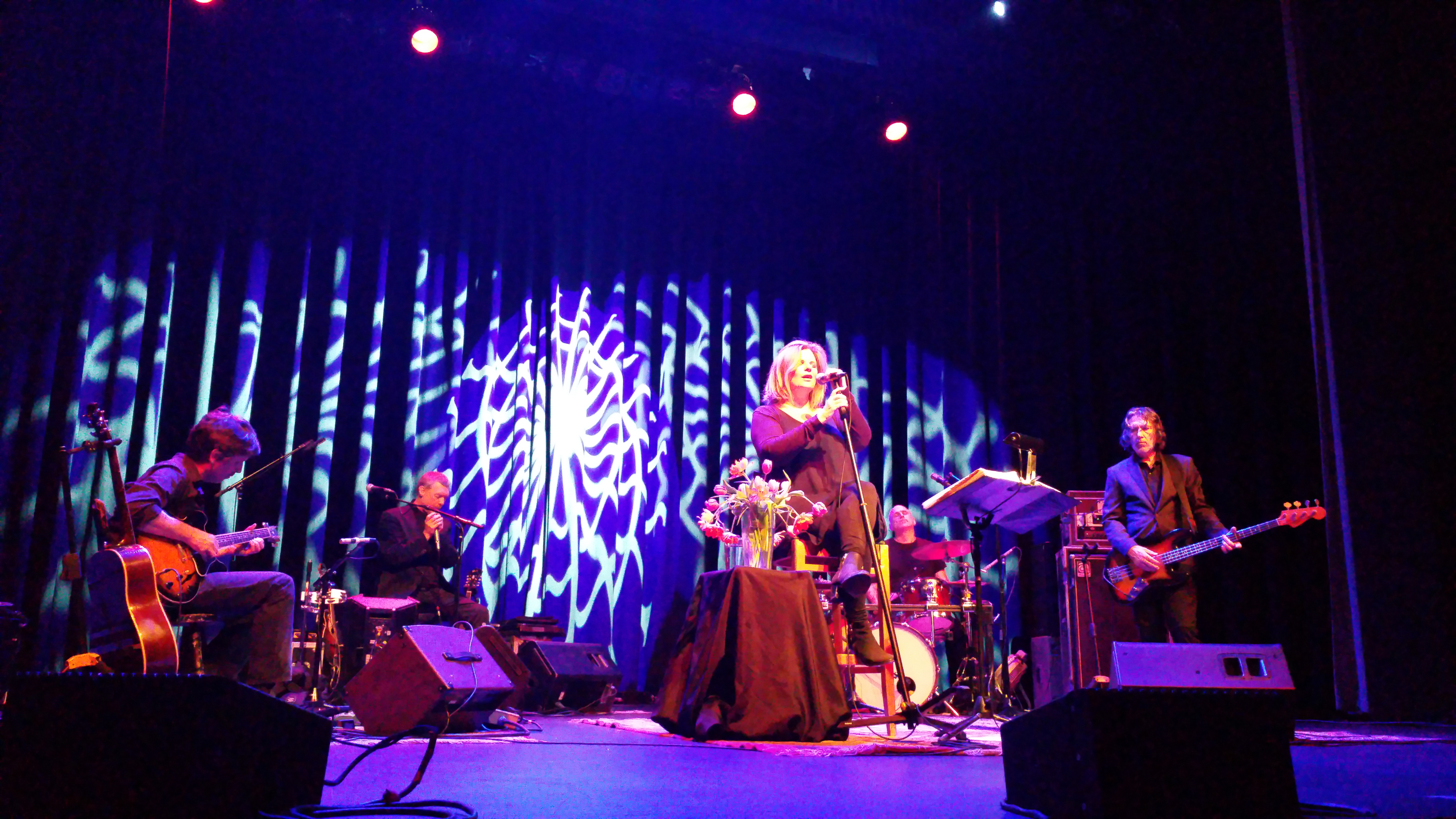
- Cowboy Junkies performing in 2015

Background information
- Origin: Toronto, Ontario, Canada
- Genres: Americana; alternative country; country rock; folk rock; slow core; blues rock
- Years active: 1986–present
- Labels: RCA; Geffen; Latent; Zoë; Strange Fruit; Cooking Vinyl
- Members: Alan Anton; Margo Timmins; Michael Timmins; Peter Timmins
- Past members: John Timmins
- Website: cowboyjunkies.com

Cowboy Junkies are an alternative country and folk rock band formed in Toronto, Ontario, Canada in 1985 by Alan Anton (bassist), Michael Timmins (songwriter, guitarist), Peter Timmins (drummer) and Margo Timmins (vocalist). The three Timminses are siblings, and Anton worked with Michael Timmins during their first couple of bands. John Timmins was a member of the band but left the group before the recording of their debut studio album. The band line-up has never changed since, although they use several guest musicians on many of their studio albums, including multi-instrumentalist Jeff Bird who has performed on every album except the first.

Cowboy Junkies' 1986 debut studio album, produced by Canadian producer Peter Moore, was the blues-inspired Whites Off Earth Now!!, recorded in the family garage using a single ambisonic microphone.

The band gained wide recognition with their second studio album, The Trinity Session (1988), recorded in 1987 at Toronto's Church of the Holy Trinity. Their sound, again with Peter Moore using the ambisonic microphone, and their mix of blues, country, folk, rock and jazz earned them both critical attention and a strong fan base. The Los Angeles Times named the recording one of the 10 best albums of 1988.

Cowboy Junkies have gone on to record 16 studio albums and five live albums, with tour dates booked into late 2026.

== History ==
=== Early history ===
Alan Anton and Michael Timmins, lifelong friends who met in kindergarten, formed their first band in high school. In 1979, influenced by post-punk bands such as Siouxsie and the Banshees and Joy Division, they recruited drummer Geoff Railton and vocalist Liza Dawson-Whisker, and formed Hunger Project in Toronto. They moved to Manhattan's Lower East Side and performed at a variety of clubs. In early 1981, the Hunger Project embarked on a multi-city tour of the United States. After that, Hunger Project moved to the United Kingdom, where they toured for three months and released the single "The Same Inside/Assembly" on their independent label, Latent Recordings.

When Hunger Project disbanded, Alan Anton and Michael Timmins remained in London and started an improvisational band named Germinal. The members – Michael Timmins on guitar, Alan Anton on bass, a drummer, and a saxophonist, played whatever they wished on their instruments at the same time. Germinal released two studio albums: Germinal 1 (1983) and Din (1984). The music newspaper New Musical Express said Germinal "ranks among the most innovative and aggressive sounds to emerge from the independent scene this year." Alan Anton and Michael Timmins had a somewhat different take, saying, "It was the ultimate release for us. But for the audience, it was quite a chore." In London, they developed journeyman skills as musicians, and expanded their knowledge of music history — Michael Timmins worked in a record store for a year to make ends meet while with Germinal. Among those who were to influence Michael Timmins and Alan Anton were jazz musicians Cecil Taylor, Ornette Coleman, and John Coltrane, along with the sound of early blues musicians Lightnin' Hopkins, John Lee Hooker, Bukka White, and Robert Johnson. Germinal broke up after three years in autumn of 1984. Alan Anton moved to Berlin and Michael Timmins returned to New York City.

Upon their return to Toronto in 1985, Alan Anton and Michael Timmins rented a house, insulated the tiny garage, and, with younger brother Pete Timmins sitting in on drums, began exploring a new musical direction. Margo was drafted to join and recalls, "I was contemplating going on to graduate school, staying in school. That was safe. I never wanted to be a musician or be onstage." Nevertheless, Michael Timmins began to hear something in what they were doing with their initial jams, realizing that a female voice was what the band needed. Michael Timmins said, "I thought if you had this female voice on top of it, you could do anything you wanted."

However, the slow musical tempos and whispery, hushed tones that defined their early work was not just musical inspiration, but came about by necessity. Their recording studio was their repurposed garage, which was just behind the house and bordered closely with their neighbours. On their first jam session, the police showed up due to a noise complaint from the neighbour. According to Michael Timmins, "We realized we had to tone down. One thing fed into the other: Margo began to realize that her singing voice was more effective quiet. We began to realize, if we can get down underneath Margo, the sound will be more effective. Pete picked up brushes – he was just learning to play drums at that point. Everything sort of came down. We learned to play with less volume."

When the unnamed band was preparing for its first gig, the members considered various names before choosing Cowboy Junkies. During their early gigs the band would perform at The Rivoli which had a small space in the back. The group would perform a rhythmic groove while Margo sang improvised vocal melodies and portions of old blues songs. Many times the Junkies entire performance would be a single jam session.

Peter Moore, a recording enthusiast who had ambitions of becoming a producer, was at their first show. According to Moore, "I was mesmerized by Margo. The very first show, people weren't paying attention to them, because they were playing so softly and quietly. Margo had her back to the audience a lot of the time."

=== 1980s ===
When the Cowboy Junkies were ready to record a studio album the band sought a like-minded recording engineer. They met Peter Moore at a dinner party, and when they began talking about recording equipment and techniques, they found that Moore's interest in single-microphone recording meshed with their desire to capture the intimate sound of their rehearsal garage. Moore had just purchased a Calrec Ambisonic microphone at the wholesale price of $9,000. The Cowboy Junkies and Moore came together at the rehearsal space on June 26, 1986, and turned the garage into a recording studio. Moore arranged the group around his Calrec, jerry-rigged a control room in the kitchen, and started recording.

The Cowboy Junkies shopped their material but were unable to find a label to distribute their work, so they revived the indie label Latent Recordings that Michael Timmins and Anton had used for their Hunger Project and Germinal works, and released Whites Off Earth Now!! in October 1986. They sold 3,000 copies. The band then toured the US. Michael Timmins described the experience: "While touring Whites we had spent a lot of time in the Southern states, especially Virginia, Georgia and the Carolinas. For some reason the club owners down there took a liking to what we were doing so we spent a lot of time crossing the kudzu choked highways that ran through the heart of the old Confederacy. Those were the days when having to spend a night in a hotel room would mean the difference between eating the next day or paying for the gas to get us to the next town, so we spent a lot of our time sleeping on the floors of friendly promoters, fans, waitresses and bartenders."

The band's next project, The Trinity Session (1988), became their breakthrough. Peter Moore again produced the album. They approached the project as a reaction against the MIDI–dominated musical styles of the '80s. Moore said, "I was angry that music had gotten into drum machines and MIDI. No humanity, no nothing. I'm listening to these recordings from the '50s with two or three mics and I'm going, 'Man that's real music.'" He chose the Church of the Holy Trinity in Toronto for its natural reverb. To better persuade the officials of the historic church, Moore claimed "The Timmins Family Singers" were recording a Christmas special. The session began early on November 27, 1987. Songs with the fewest instruments were recorded first, and then the songs with gradually more complex arrangements. In this way Moore was able to solve acoustic problems one by one. To better balance Margo's vocals against the electric guitars and drums, she was recorded through a PA system left behind by a previous group. By making subtle changes in volume and placement relative to the microphone over six hours, Moore and the band finally reached the distinctive sound of the album.

Music critic for Rolling Stone magazine, Anthony DeCurtis, summed up the result of the group's efforts in a four-star review of the album: "The Trinity Session is in the great tradition of albums that establish a mood and sustain it so consistently that the entire record seems like one continuously unfolding song. The mood in this instance is hypnotic and introspective – an intense, melancholic longing that blends the elemental emotions of country music and the blues with the poetic world-weariness of the Velvet Underground. [...] Having good songs, the skill to convey what they have to say and, most important, a vision, the Cowboy Junkies dispensed with high-tech trumpery and made their record simply and seriously. That attitude helped make the album as important as it is inspiring."

The album was included in the book 1001 Albums You Must Hear Before You Die (2006).

=== 1990s ===
The band's third studio album was more challenging, requiring three attempts to get the sound the band desired. Yet despite the problems with the making of it, the band considers it a very exciting and turbulent time in their career and state that The Caution Horses (1990) remains one of their favourite albums. The band rented a small recording studio in the docklands of Toronto with the intention of using the room like the garage their debut studio album was recorded in, instead of a room with live acoustics like the church room they used for The Trinity Session (1988). The session went badly because the group had just come off the road after a gruelling tour and were tired, particularly Margo Timmins who had a terrible head cold. After a few hours they realized the session wasn't working out, and they left.

The second attempt was made on April 21 of 1987 when Peter Moore rented the Sharon Temple, an historic landmark located in the village of Sharon, Ontario. Michael Timmins recalls, "The arrangements that we had developed for this new set of songs were at times so full and lush, unlike the spareness of most of Trinity's songs, that we were immediately confronted with the problem of how to control this swirl of sound so that it didn't just turn to mush on tape. Another problem was that the Temple was a lot more acoustically lively than any of us had imagined. As a result when the music swelled it would often spill over into Margo's vocal mic and feedback." At the end of three days during which the temperature would drop below freezing, Michael Timmins states, "When we packed up and left Sharon that day I don't think that any of us felt that we had captured anything special. It had been a difficult three days and I think that we were all just happy that on that third day we had at least made some decent recordings of the songs if not necessarily memorable ones." Over the next several months the band were touring and playing songs on the Sharon tape. As the band listened, new ideas for them evolved. They also wrote additional songs. Although the band truly loved the recordings, the songs continued to develop on stage, and they believed the session no longer accurately represented where they were as a band. In 2022, however, they released the Sharon session as a special edition vinyl album as well as in streaming formats.

At the end of the tour, they decided to go into Eastern Studios in downtown Toronto and reinvent how they recorded themselves. The Caution Horses sessions went quickly and smoothly, and were recorded over several days in December 1989. Michael Timmins believes: "The beauty of the recording and one of the reasons it remains one of our favourites is that it captures the essence of the band which magically fell together during the recording of The Trinity Session and which forged its own voice, under the glare of a very intense spotlight, in the clubs and concert halls of the world."

With their next studio album, Black Eyed Man (1992), Michael Timmins wanted to explore music structure, specifically time shifts and tempo shifts; while Margo Timmins wanted to expand her singing style and her range. Several musicians from previous albums showed up during the rehearsal sessions, along with about twenty five other Toronto players that were known to the band, or recruited because of their skills with instruments the band wanted to include in the album. Realizing he needed a theme to hold the album together what Michael Timmins decided upon was "love found, love lost and love betrayed - it was to be the journey of the faceless, nameless and haunted Black Eyed Man."

The band's fifth studio album, Pale Sun, Crescent Moon (1993) is a song cycle about male-female relationships. Margo Timmins describes the theme of the album as "there is love and there is all that conspires to steal love away." Michael Timmins says, "It is a very dense and complex work both lyrically and musically." Music critic, Mike Boehm, summed the album up this way: "By the album's end, Margo Timmins, the singer known for her preternatural hush, can be heard declaring herself with assertive bite: 'It's a (expletive) ole world, but this ole girl, well she ain't giving in.' While it hasn't exactly turned into a hard-rock band (the closely drawn, highly literate, mood-conscious internal monologue remains the signature of the band's style), those aggressive opening and closing moments do signal a desire to avoid being typecast as that whispering band that found success by recording in an echoing church."

The Cowboy Junkies' sixth studio album, Lay It Down (1996), was one in which the group wanted to make the music outside of Toronto and away from usual routines, so they searched for a place that was a comfortable drive away from Toronto, but would feel remote. Alan Anton recalls, "We found Rock Island, named not for music but for geology. It is actually one big rock with stuff growing on it and has one small house with a great stone fireplace. We went there for a week at a time and between chopping wood, cooking, boating, whittling, hiking and staring into the fire, worked up some songs that were as laid back and sparse as the setting." When the Junkies went to record the songs, they felt that their chosen songs would come together if they could "find a studio which would approximate the vibe of Rock Island in the sense of a relaxed but focused mood and its remoteness from the music industry mainland." They found a big-porched southern house in Athens, Georgia that fit their needs. The Junkies moved into the rented home in the suburbs of Athens in June 1995. The producer and engineer John Keane had built a homey but state-of-the-art studio, and the band settled in quickly.

The Cowboy Junkies' last studio album of the decade is an alternative country album, Miles from Our Home (1998). Wanting to repeat the process of writing and creating used for Lay It Down, Michael Timmins found a house near a gristmill on a pond, a couple hours drive from Toronto, where he spent six months writing songs. During that time, Margo and Peter Timmins and Alan Anton would come down to work on songs. Then Michael wrote more, until the songs were worked out and ready to record. On New Year's Day in 1997, just as Timmins was planning the album, the band heard that Townes Van Zandt had died. Van Zandt was a friend of the band, had toured with them in their bus in 1990, and was perhaps the biggest influence as a songwriter on Michael. On the day that Michael Timmins had heard that Van Zandt had died he wrote the first draft of "Blue Guitar", "as a tribute to the man who had the bluest guitar that I had ever heard."

=== 2000s ===
Throughout their career, Cowboy Junkies have approached each studio album to see where they can change or improve. Open, which was released on May 15, 2001, follows in that tradition. While they were on a tour to support their live album Waltz Across America, which lasted nine months and had many breaks in the schedule, they began working on new material. They added two to three new songs a month into their performances, allowing the songs to evolve on stage. During breaks, they would go to sound engineer Daryl Smith's studio, Chemical Sound, to live record material they had created. Being able to set up in a couple hours, record some tracks, and be done by the end of the day was a departure from their habit of trying to complete an album's worth of songs in a set recording period. On each visit, they would record two or three songs. They also took the opportunity to re-record songs. After the band had recorded fifteen tracks, they listened and decided they had the songs they needed, with two additional songs recorded at Peter Moore's home studio.

One Soul Now (2004) was recorded over the course of a year, from October 2002 to October 2003. Its central idea is that everyone is interconnected. When the band returned home after their Open Tour, they decided to turn their rehearsal area into a recording studio which they dubbed The Clubhouse. This new arrangement changed the process of how they created their tracks. Previously, they would start in the rehearsal space, determine how the songs would work, then go to a studio. Now, the band recorded everything as they worked through the rehearsal process.

The Cowboy Junkies next project was Early 21st Century Blues, which was recorded February through March 2005, and released in August of that year. It was begun a few months after their previous tour. The theme for the album was war, violence, fear, greed, ignorance, or loss, and everybody had to bring two or three songs written by other people. This album was unique in that John Timmins recorded with his siblings, playing guitar.

At the End of Paths Taken was released on April 9, 2007. Michael Timmins wrote songs that "reflect the complex, frustrating, edifying, and conflict-ridden web of relationships that constitute the family, from nuclear to extended to global. He is a parent, and a son with aging parents. He plays with his siblings in the Cowboy Junkies." Timmins blends his alternative country music sound with ferocious guitar work on "My Little Basquiat" and "Mountain". At times Timmins sounds as if he has lost control of his guitar playing, "until you realize there's not a stray note to be found. . . . Timmons' [sic] guitar playing has grown more aggressive over the years."

For the twentieth anniversary of their breakthrough studio album, The Trinity Session (1988), the Cowboy Junkies reinterpreted the album to highlight what twenty years of performing experience brought to the songs. In order to expand upon the goal of reinterpreting, the Cowboy Junkies invited three guest musicians whose work has affected the Cowboy Junkies, and whose work and lives were affected by the album. Guest musicians on the 2007 album include Natalie Merchant, Vic Chesnutt, and Ryan Adams. Each does lead vocal on one of the album's songs (Merchant on "To Love Is to Bury", Chesnutt on "Postcard Blues", and Adams on "200 More Miles"). They also perform on other tracks. Jeff Bird, a session musician who has appeared on virtually every Cowboy Junkies album, is also included in the project. In order to create the same atmosphere, they kept rehearsal to a minimum, getting together for a few hours a day before the recording. The guest musicians worked with the band to re-imagine the songs, making suggestions, trying out fresh nuances. The album contains a performance film, Trinity Revisited, and a documentary film, Trinity Session Revisited. Directors Pierre and François Lamoureux, produced and recorded the album and the films. Although the album was not recorded with a single microphone like the original album, the directors placed the musicians in a circle and used a surround microphone, augmented the recording with ten close-mics to record them.

=== 2010s ===
The Nomad Series (2017) is a set of four studio albums that was released over three years from 2010 to 2012. The Nomad Series is not based on a particular theme regarding music, but are based on a set of paintings by their friend, artist Enrique Martinez Celaya. The group found the name appropriate, since they have been touring for over 30 years. The Junkies had no recording contract when they created the Nomad Series, which freed them up to be experimental with their music, to avoid categorizing the planned releases.

The first album in the series is Renmin Park (2010), which is based on ideas the band's principal songwriter, Michael Timmins, got while living in China for three months with his wife and three children. Two of his children were adopted from China, and during their stay they visited the birth village of his adopted daughters. Most of their time was spent in Jingjiang, situated on the Yangtze River about two hours' drive from Shanghai. The music that inspired Timmins most during the visit was found at Renmin Park, where a variety of musicians would gather throughout the day, bringing their erhus, pipas, shangxians, various percussion instruments; and a mix of singers performed. Timmins found most of the musicians outstanding, he thought the singers were good because they all performed with passion. About halfway through the visit, Timmins was introduced to Eric Chen, who was passionate about music, and became Timmins' friend. Chen brought Timmins a variety of CDs and videos that showcased the Chinese rock scene.

Michael asked his brother, Peter Timmins, to send him a high-end portable recorder, which he carried everywhere he went, and recorded music, conversations, exercise classes, badminton games, traffic, students chatter in classrooms, street hawkers, and more. He sent the recordings to Joby Baker in British Columbia with instructions to create loops of the sounds, and to use his imagination. The core of the album is built around a fictional love story between two people who live in different worlds that always keep them apart. Renmin Park is also a thank-you letter to the people of the city that so kindly welcomed him and his family.

On December 25, 2009, at the age of 45, Cowboy Junkies friend, Vic Chesnutt, died from an overdose of muscle relaxants. Chesnutt was generally a friendly and cheerful man, but he sometimes suffered bouts of severe depression. Demons, released January 18, 2011, is the Cowboy Junkies tribute to him. The band had included him in their twentieth anniversary celebration of The Trinity Session when they made Trinity Revisited (2007). Chesnutt sang lead vocals on the song, "Postcard Blues." He had also toured with the group several times, starting with the tour supporting Lay It Down (1996). Michael Timmins stated, "One of the hopes of this album is that it inspires people to seek out the originals and keep his music alive. We had intended to do an album where he would write the songs, and we would be the band. Now we're trying to fulfil a bit of that desire." The Cowboy Junkies managed to turn an album born from grief into an assertion of life.

On October 14, 2011, music critic Jason Lent began his review of Sing in My Meadow with this observation, "When R.E.M. called it quits, the band talked about walking away having maintained their artistic integrity throughout a 30-year career. As Cowboy Junkies pass the quarter century mark, the Toronto band must rest well at night. The band's consistent work flies under the radar more times than not and the band sounds content with keeping it that way." He continues, "One of the band's live staples in recent years is "Hunted" from 1994's Pale Sun Crescent Moon. Revisiting the song here, the original sounds frail and timid in comparison. Margo belts out the lyrics with the dry bitterness of someone who has witnessed first-hand the arrows that fly between men and women. As the band shakes the rafters, Bird delivers a mandolin solo that redefines the possibilities of the instrument."

The Wilderness was released on March 27, 2012, and is the fourth and final entry of The Nomad Series. The album reflects the introspective nature of winter. The album is a return to the folk vibe the band played with in the late 80s and early 90s. Songwriter Michael Timmins states: "I started to think in terms of an album of songs reflecting on the lives of characters I'd written about early in the bands career and bringing those characters . . . into the future to see where their lives were at now." About his lyrics, Timmins says: "Some of those songs have little touch points where . . . you can see how they connect to earlier songs -- even character's names and stuff pops into them, and that's intentional." The style of the songs on the album comes closer to the typical Cowboy Junkies music, more than the other albums in The Nomad series.

The Cowboy Junkies studio album, All That Reckoning, was released on July 13, 2018. In an interview about the upcoming album with Billboard, guitarist and songwriter Michael Timmins said, "There's a lot of pressures and a lot of crumbling of institutions, very little foundation to put one's feet on again, especially at an older age. You sort of expect things to be there and realize, 'My God, what I thought was a standard, whether it be an institution or a way of dealing with people in our society, is disappearing." In 2019, they joined the Canadian Music Hall of Fame.

=== 2020s ===
The Cowboy Junkies' eighteenth studio album, Ghosts, was released digitally on March 30, 2020.

The band contributed a cover version of Bob Dylan's 2020 song "I've Made Up My Mind to Give Myself to You" to the Dylan Revisited compilation album in 2021. Variety ranked it the 17th best Dylan cover of all time the month after it premiered.

Their nineteenth studio album, a cover album, Songs of the Recollection, was released on March 25, 2022. Such Ferocious Beauty followed in 2023.

=== Concerts and television performances ===
Michael Timmins states that "By the Spring of 1990 we had been on the road for close to two years straight, trying to stay right-side-up in the whirlwind of attention that was created by the release of The Trinity Session (1988) and the subsequent release of The Caution Horses (1990). We had accumulated, literally, trunks full of press clippings from around the world, but most importantly we had built up our confidence on stage. Margo was emerging as a true front-person and we were gelling as band. In May of that year we landed in the London for our first full fledge UK tour and were greeted with much adulation and interest. The tour was a tremendous success on all levels and thankfully the BBC was there to record one of the shows at The Royal Exchange Theatre in Manchester."

The Cowboy Junkies have performed on The Tonight Show Starring Johnny Carson, The Tonight Show with Jay Leno, The David Letterman Show, The Tonight Show Starring Jimmy Fallon, Late Night with Conan O'Brien, Later... with Jools Holland, Saturday Night Live, at Canadian Songwriters Hall of Fame, when they were inducted in 2015, and many other venues. Among their recorded and commercially available concerts is the June 25, 2002 documentary Open Road, a four-hour DVD/CD documentary of performances from 2001. The DVD contains their Quebec City Summer Festival concert. In June 2007, they performed alongside the Boston Pops at Boston Symphony Hall conducted by Keith Lockhart. On January 1, 2017, Cowboy Junkies were part of CBC's The Strombo Show's Hip 30. Canadian bands covered songs from the Tragically Hip to commemorate the Hip's 30th anniversary. Including the compilation albums Open Road and The Radio One Sessions (both 2002), the Junkies have published seven of their live performances.

== Personnel ==
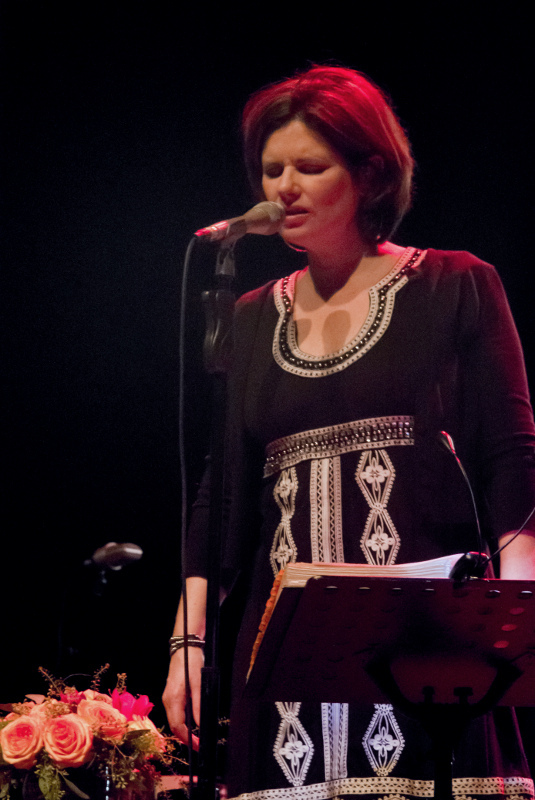
Margo Timmins, in a 2012 Philadelphia concert

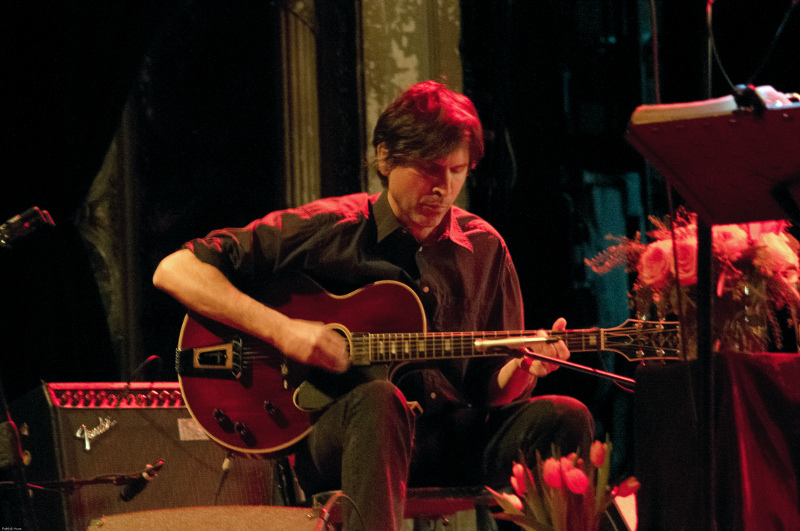
Guitarist Michael Timmins in concert in 2012

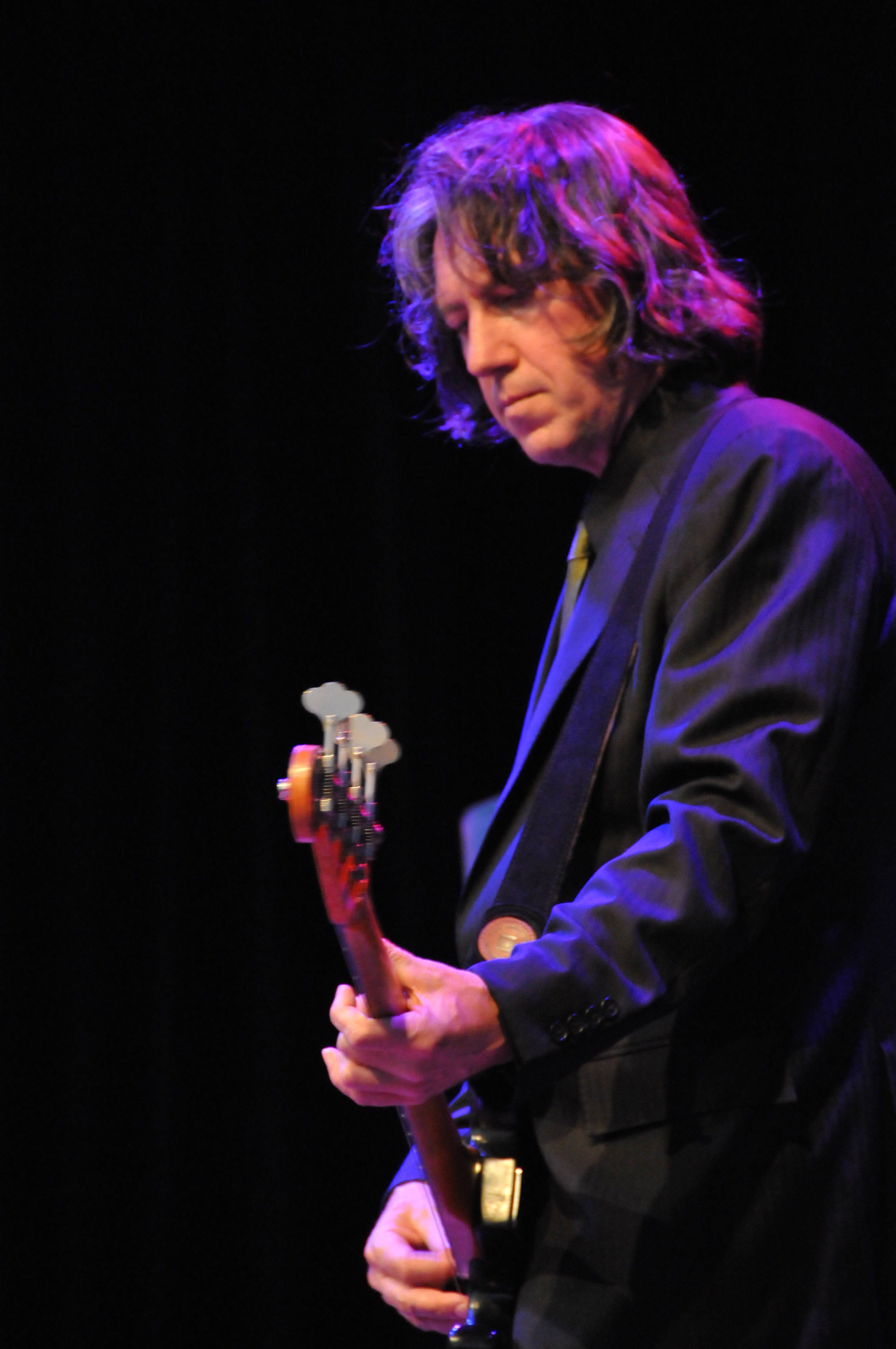
Alan Anton at a 2008 concert in Guelph, Ontario

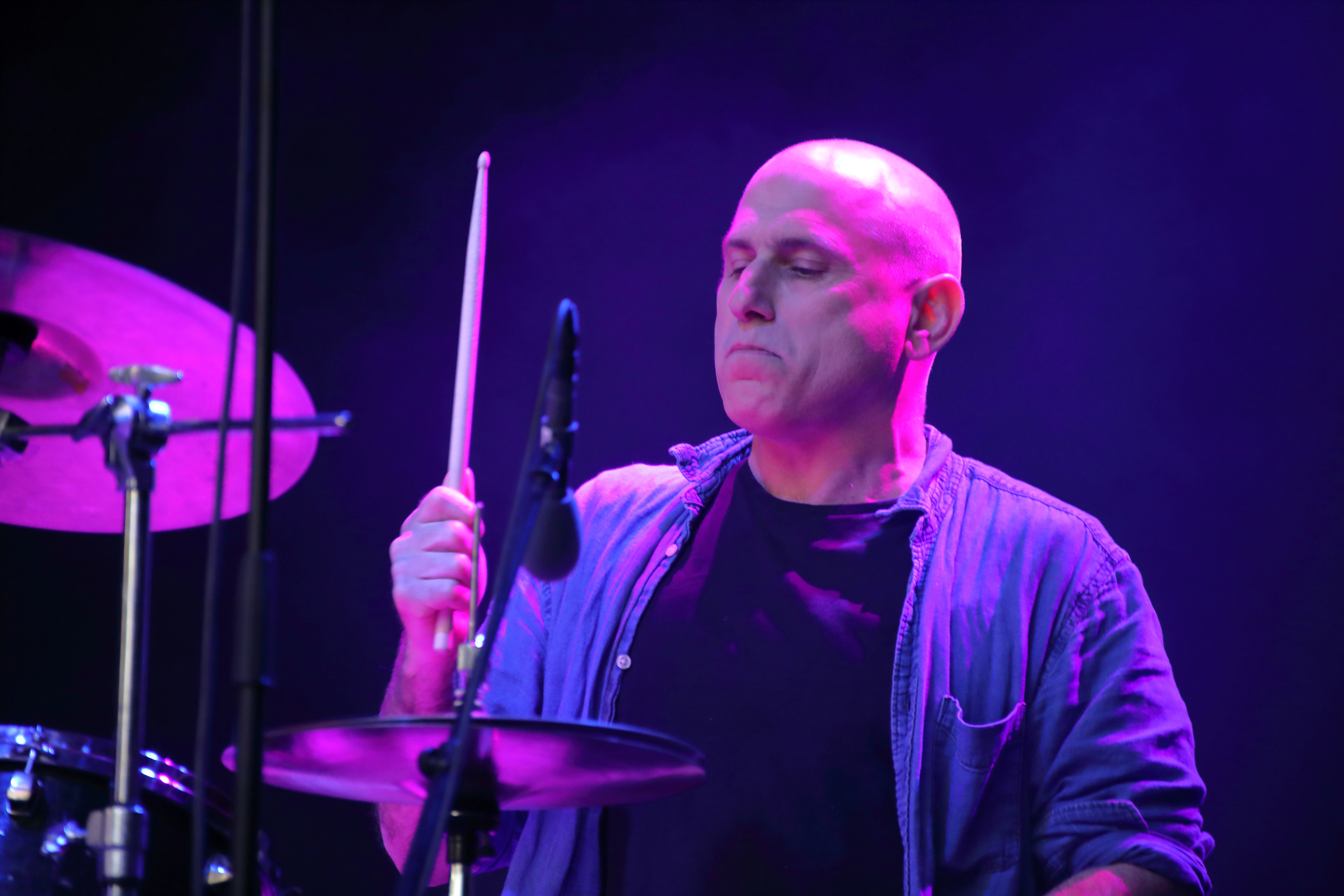
Peter Timmins in concert, 2019

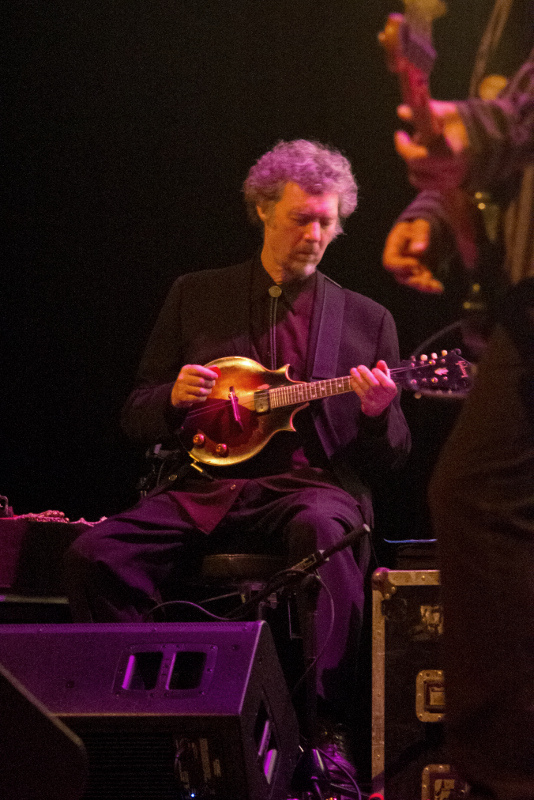
Jeff Bird, in a 2012 Philadelphia concert
- Margo Timmins (vocals, born January 27, 1961, Montreal)
- Michael Timmins (guitar and chief songwriter, born April 21, 1959, Montreal)
- Peter Timmins (drums, born October 29, 1965, Montreal)
- Alan Anton (bass, born June 22, 1959, Montreal)

Though not an official member, multi-instrumentalist Jeff Bird has recorded and toured regularly with the band since 1988. He mainly plays mandolins and harmonica, but has also performed on violin, percussion, bass guitar, guitar and keyboards.

== Discography ==
=== Albums ===
==== Studio albums ====
Year	Album	Chart positions									Certifications	
Year	Album	CAN	CAN Country	AUS	NED	NZ	NOR	SWE	UK	US	CAN	US
1986	Whites Off Earth Now!!											
1988	The Trinity Session	28	30	73		26				26	2× Platinum	Platinum
1990	The Caution Horses	11		77	79	27	10	40	33	47	Platinum	
1992	Black Eyed Man	8		88	69	32		42	21	76	Gold	
1993	Pale Sun, Crescent Moon	25		181						114	Gold	
1996	Lay It Down	20		92		43				55	Gold	
1998	Miles from Our Home			174					184	98		
2001	Open	104								107		
2004	One Soul Now									127		
2005	Early 21st Century Blues											
2007	At the End of Paths Taken											
2007	Trinity Revisited (CD/DVD)	94										
2010	Nomad Series, Vol.1 Renmin Park									169		
2011	Nomad Series, Vol.2 Demons											
2011	Nomad Series, Vol.3 Sing in My Meadow											
2012	Nomad Series, Vol.4 The Wilderness											
2018	All That Reckoning								78			
2020	Ghosts											
2022	Songs of the Recollection											
2022	Sharon											
2023	Such Ferocious Beauty											

==== Live albums ====
Year	Album
1995	200 More Miles: Live Performances 1985–1994
2000	Waltz Across America
2002	Open Road (CD/DVD)
2003	In the Time Before Llamas
2006	Long Journey Home (CD/DVD)
2009	Acoustic Junk (limited release)
2020	Music Is the Drug (limited release)

==== Compilation albums ====
Year	Album
1996	Studio: Selected Studio Recordings 1986–1995
1999	Rarities, B-Sides and Slow, Sad Waltzes
2001	Best of the Cowboy Junkies
2002	The Radio One Sessions
2003	Platinum & Gold Collection
2012	The Nomad Series (Box set)
2015	Notes Falling Slow (Box set)
2021	All That Reckoning / Ghosts (Combined LP release)
2025	More Acoustic Junk (5 new tracks, 5 from Acoustic Junk)

=== EPs ===
Year	Album
1992	Live!
2004	'Neath Your Covers, Part 1

=== Singles ===
Year	Title	Peak chart positions							Album
Year	Title	CAN	CAN AC	CAN Country	AUS	UK	US Modern Rock	US Radio	Album
1989	"Sweet Jane"	75	—	—	81	—	5	—	The Trinity Session
1989	"Misguided Angel"	24	—	39	—	—	—	—	The Trinity Session
1989	"Blue Moon Revisited"	—	—	—	—	87	—	—	The Trinity Session
1990	"Sun Comes Up, It's Tuesday Morning"	22	5	78	—	90	11	—	The Caution Horses
1990	"'Cause Cheap Is How I Feel"	68	15	30	—	93	—	—	The Caution Horses
1990	"Rock and Bird"	34	11	—	—	—	—	—	The Caution Horses
1992	"Southern Rain"	20	6	—	—	—	—	—	Black Eyed Man
1992	"A Horse in the Country"	52	23	—	—	—	—	—	Black Eyed Man
1992	"Murder, Tonight, in the Trailer Park"	—	—	—	—	—	25	—	Black Eyed Man
1992	"If You Were the Woman and I Was the Man"	—	31	—	—	—	—	—	Black Eyed Man
1993	"Hard to Explain"	22	19	—	—	—	—	—	Pale Sun, Crescent Moon
1994	"Anniversary Song"	10	3	—	—	—	28	—	Pale Sun, Crescent Moon
1994	"Sweet Jane" (re-release)	—	—	—	—	—	9	52	Natural Born Killers
1996	"A Common Disaster"^{A}	11	12	—	130	180	20	75	Lay It Down
1996	"Angel Mine"	7	18	—	—	—	—	—	Lay It Down
1996	"Speaking Confidentially"	34	—	—	—	—	—	—	Lay It Down
1997	"Come Calling"	67	35	—	—	—	—	—	Lay It Down
1998	"Miles from Our Home"	64	28	—	—	—	—	—	Miles from Our Home
2001	"I'm So Open"	—	—	—	—	—	—	—	Open
2004	"Stars of Our Stars"	—	—	—	—	—	—	—	One Soul Now
"—" denotes releases that did not chart

- ^{A}"A Common Disaster" also peaked at No. 11 on the Canadian Rock Singles chart.

=== Music videos ===
Year	Video
1989	"Sweet Jane"
1989	"Misguided Angel"
1989	"Blue Moon Revisited"
1990	"Sun Comes Up, It's Tuesday Morning"
1990	"Cause Cheap Is How I Feel"
1990	"Rock and Bird"
1992	"A Horse in the Country"
1994	"Anniversary Song"
1994	"The Post"
1994	"Sweet Jane"
1996	"A Common Disaster"
1996	"Angel Mine"
1998	"Miles from Our Home"
2001	"I'm So Open"

=== Compilation appearances ===
- It Came from Canada, Vol. 4, 1988 ("Blue Moon Revisited (Song for Elvis)")
- Pump Up the Volume, 1990 ("Me and the Devil Blues")
- The Cities' Sampler Vol. 2: Collectibles, 1990 ("Decoration Day")
- Deadicated 1991 ("To Lay Me Down")
- Born to Choose, 1993 ("Lost My Driving Wheel")
- Upfront! Canadians Live from Mountain Stage, 1994 ("Misguided Angel")
- Natural Born Killers, 1994 ("Sweet Jane")
- Borrowed Tunes: A Tribute to Neil Young, 1994 ("Tired Eyes")
- Oh What a Feeling: A Vital Collection of Canadian Music, 1996 ("Misguided Angel")
- The Truth About Cats & Dogs, 1996 ("Angel Mine")
- Cities' Sampler Vol. 10, 1998 ("Miles from Our Home")
- WXRV Presents: Live from the River Music Hall Vol. 1, 1998 ("Come Calling")
- Return of the Grievous Angel: A Tribute to Gram Parsons, 1999 ("Ooh Las Vegas")
- Poet: A Tribute to Townes Van Zandt, 2001 ("Highway Kind")
- 107.1 KGSR Radio Austin - Broadcasts Vol.10, 2002 ("Something More Besides You")
- WYEP Live and Direct: Volume 4 - On Air Performances, 2002 ("Thousand Year Prayer")
- Beautiful: A Tribute to Gordon Lightfoot, 2003 ("The Way I Feel")
- This Bird Has Flown – A 40th Anniversary Tribute to the Beatles' Rubber Soul, 2005 ("Run for Your Life")
- Northern Songs: Canada's Best and Brightest, 2008 ("Sweet Jane")
- The Rounder Records Story, 2010 ("Small Swift Birds")
- Flight, 2012 ("Sweet Jane")
- The Kennedy Suite, 2013 ("Disintegrating")
- God Don't Never Change: The Songs of Blind Willie Johnson, 2016 ("Jesus is Coming Soon")

== See also ==
- Rock music of Canada
- Music of Canada
- List of Canadian musicians
- List of bands from Canada

== Bibliography ==
- XX: Lyrics and Photographs of the Cowboy Junkies, with Watercolors by Enrique Martinez Celaya. 2007. Santa Monica: Whale and Star.
- The Nomad Series: Lyrics and Photographs of the Cowboy Junkies. 2012. Miami: Whale and Star.
