= The Caution Horses =

Studio album by Cowboy Junkies
- Released: March 1, 1990
- Recorded: December 1989
- Genre: Alternative country, blues rock
- Length: 44:32
- Label: RCA
- Producer: Peter Moore, Michael Timmins

Cowboy Junkies chronology
The Trinity Session (1988)	The Caution Horses (1990)	Black Eyed Man (1992)

Professional ratings
Review scores
Source	Rating
AllMusic	3/5 stars
The Encyclopedia of Popular Music	3/5 stars
Entertainment Weekly	B−
Rolling Stone	3/5 stars
The Rolling Stone Album Guide	3.5/5 stars

The Caution Horses is the third studio album by the Canadian alt-country band Cowboy Junkies, released in 1990.

The first album following their 1988 breakthrough The Trinity Session, The Caution Horses features a more conventional, polished sound than the earlier album's spare, haunting country blues. As a consequence, the album received average reviews from music critics, who said that the band had sacrificed their distinctive style.

== Reception ==
However, the album's accessibility to mainstream pop and rock audiences also meant that it received more radio airplay and spawned bigger chart hits ("Sun Comes Up, It's Tuesday Morning" and "Rock and Bird", which featured Bruce Hornsby on the piano on the single version) than The Trinity Session had. A number of critics have also noted that while the album is undeniably a disappointment when compared to its predecessor, when taken on its own merits it is a better album than its initial reception would suggest. The album focuses on the band's slow, languorous style, a style that has been called simplistic, or narcoleptic, or uncategorizable. Margo states "It's not country, it's not blues, it's not rock, we just do what we do." The album peaked at number 47 on the U.S. Billboard 200 and number 33 on the UK Charts.

== Album development ==
=== The Sharon Temple sessions ===
The band decided to record in a live setting as they had on The Trinity Session. This time they chose the Sharon Temple, a National Historic Site north of Toronto, as their studio. The recording proved challenging, as they had to adapt to the unique acoustics of the Sharon Temple and also the cool temperatures of a Canadian spring (they were not allowed to bring heaters into this unheated building due to its heritage designations). The cover of the album shows the band outside of this historic building. The intent of the recording was to use a single ambisonic mic like the one used for The Trinity Session, but this time Peter Moore was unfamiliar with the building, and the songs the band had written were more lush, which created recording problems, such as the music spilling over into Margo's vocal mic and causing feedback. Of the three days for the recording, the first two days were spent solving the musical challenges, and fighting the cold temperatures. Moore explained to the band why cold temperatures were perfect to record in, and the band explained to Moore that cold temperatures negatively affected human anatomy, and prolonged exposure caused extremities such as fingers to stop working.

On the third day, the sound problems were resolved, both by configuring the band around the microphone, and also by banishing Margo to a far corner of the building in a small makeshift sound booth made of baffles and sound blankets which they named the "witches hut". For the rest of their last day there, they made and recorded their music, and when the closed up, they were happy that they had some decent recordings, if not anything special. A few days later, they listened to the recordings, and decided to call it good. The band called the record company, and told them their album was finished. The record company executives told the band that the results were not what they were hoping for. However the company was patient with the band, and everyone agreed to live with the material for a while before deciding anything. While the Cowboy Junkies were touring Europe, they worked the new songs into their sets. As they played the songs, the songs changed and matured. When they came back they re-listened to the Sharon tapes and agreed that the tracks were not what they wanted to release, and they decided to re-record the music.

These songs were released in 2022, when Cowboy Junkies put out Sharon. The recordings were mastered for the musicians' benefit, but there were no serious plans to release it until 2010, when renewed interest in The Trinity Sessions made them reconsider putting out a finalized version of these sessions.

== Original Track listing ==
No.	Title	Writer(s)	Length
1.	"Sun Comes Up, It's Tuesday Morning"		3:51
2.	"Cause Cheap Is How I Feel"		4:15
3.	"Escape So Simple"		5:06
4.	"Farewell To London Town"		4:54
5.	"Powderfinger"	Neil Young	5:26
6.	"Where Are You Tonight"		5:04
7.	"Mariner's Song"	Michael Timmins, Margo Timmins	6:15
8.	"Thirty Summers"		3:58
9.	"Dead Flowers"		4:57

== iTunes Track listing ==
No.	Title	Writer(s)	Length
1.	"Sun Comes Up, It's Tuesday Morning"		3:48
2.	"Cause Cheap Is How I Feel"		4:16
3.	"Escape So Simple"		5:07
4.	"Captain Kidd"		4:40
5.	"Thirty Summers"		4:00
6.	"Where Are You Tonight"		5:09
7.	"Mariner's Song"	Michael Timmins, Margo Timmins	6:11
8.	"Dead Flowers"		4:51
9.	"Powderfinger"		5:53

=== The Caution Horses sessions ===
When the band returned to Toronto, they made a decision to go to Eastern Studios in downtown Toronto, and find a new way to record their sound. The band really liked the one-mic sound, but wanted to take advantage of the multi-track equipment at the studio. Moore arranged the group around a mic, and spent a fair amount of time balancing the sound, but at the same time they placed individual mics on each instrument to capture each individual performance on a separate track, allowing them to augment the sound of the central mic as needed. The recording arrangement allowed them to capture the intimacy of live recordings. The sessions went relatively smoothly, they just rolled tape and played over a handful of days in December. Because of using multiple mics and tracks, for the first time the band had created an album which had to be mixed. The band felt they were too close to the material, so they brought in an outsider to mix the music. When they listened to the results, they trashed the mixes and decided to redo them themselves, spending a couple of weeks in the studio with Moore and their engineer, Tom Henderson.

== Track listing ==
All tracks are written by Michael Timmins except where noted.

No.	Title	Writer(s)	Length
1.	"Sun Comes Up, It's Tuesday Morning"		3:56
2.	"Cause Cheap Is How I Feel"		4:13
3.	"Thirty Summers"		4:15
4.	"Mariner's Song"		6:20
5.	"Powderfinger"	Neil Young	5:46
6.	"Rock and Bird"		3:30
7.	"Witches"	Michael Timmins, Margo Timmins	2:44
8.	"Where Are You Tonight?"		5:07
9.	"Escape Is So Simple"		5:15
10.	"You Will Be Loved Again"	Mary Margaret O'Hara	3:26
Total length:			44:32

== Personnel ==
Cowboy Junkies

- Margo Timmins – vocals
- Michael Timmins – guitar
- Alan Anton – bass
- Peter Timmins – drums

Additional Musicians

- Jeff Bird – mandolin, harmonica, fiddle
- Jaro Czerwinec – accordion
- Kim Deschamps – pedal steel guitar, lap steel guitar
- David Houghton – percussion

Production

- Produced by Peter Moore and Michael Timmins
- Mixed by Peter Moore and Cowboy Junkies
- Engineered by Peter Moore and Tom Henderson
- Assisted by Jeff Ham and Martin Lee
- Studio Monitor Mix by Ricardo Caltagirone
- Digitally Mastered by Peter Moore
- Artwork Concept – Cowboy Junkies
- Art Direction by David Houghton
- Cover Photo by Graham Henderson
