= Peter J. Moore =

Canadian record producer (1956–2023)

- Born: August 6, 1956; Hamilton, Ontario, Canada
- Died: November 11, 2023 (aged 67) Toronto, Ontario, Canada
- Occupation: Producer

Peter Joseph Moore (August 6, 1956 – November 11, 2023) was a Canadian music producer who was first recognized for his innovative recordings of the Cowboy Junkies, produced on a shoestring budget.

== Early life ==
In 1976, Peter, and a few other students, started the campus radio broadcast station CHRW-FM, while at the University of Western Ontario ("UWO") in London, Ontario. He was the on-air DJ for the new music program covering the punk rock and new wave scene.

== Radio DJ ==
At that time most records from the current artists were imported from England, which created a problem fulfilling the radio's "33% Canadian content" obligation. Since there were very few Canadian releases, Moore started recording the live shows of local and touring Canadian punk rock bands at his own expense and playing them on his radio show, "The Simon Less Radio Program". In 1979, while still studying for a degree in anthropology, Peter founded a record label called Silent Head Records and provided a rehearsal space in his own rented house for the local punk scene.

== Producer ==
By 1981, his self-taught producing/engineering skills had reached a professional level and he branched out into other forms of music such as jazz and classical. After graduating UWO in 1982, he founded MDI Productions (incorporated in 1986) and moved his operation to Toronto.

In Toronto, Moore continued to produce rock, jazz, and classical recordings as well as film and TV scores. In 1985, he was approached by Adcom Electronics, Canada’s largest professional video supplier, to create and manage a new audio division. His duties included designing and outfitting professional music, film, and television studios throughout Canada such as Film House, CBC Toronto, Pathe, Manta, CBC Montreal, Sounds Interchange, Eastern, PFA, Sound House, CBC Vancouver (exceeding sales 1.8 million in his last year, 1989).

In 1988, Moore produced the now famous one-microphone recording The Trinity Session by the Cowboy Junkies. The album was released in early 1988 on Latent Records in Canada, and re-released worldwide in 1989 by RCA New York City. It was recorded at Toronto, Ontario's Church of the Holy Trinity on November 27, 1987, using one ambisonic stereo microphone connected to a Beta VCR. It became an international success story selling more than 1.5 million copies in the first year. He left his employment at Adcom and has been producing, mastering and restoring music full-time ever since.

In 1993, he produced Willie P. Bennett's album Take My Own Advice. He was the music producer/engineer/mixer for the 1996 movie Hard Core Logo. He wrote three of the songs and co-wrote with Swamp Baby the rest of the songs acted out by Hard Core Logo to playback. His work on Hard Core Logo won him, and his co-writers, the Genie Award for Best Original Song at the 17th Genie Awards in 1996, for the song "Who the Hell Do You Think You Are?". He later appeared in the role of a recording engineer in the sequel Hard Core Logo 2.

Moore was later noted as a Master at re-mastering analog media for the digital age. When a long-lost tape of Joni Mitchell's was found, her Amchitka benefit concert for the birth of Greenpeace, it was brought to Moore who "painstakingly restored each minute of the 40-year-old tapes."

A similar challenge was brought to Moore in 2013 when Garth Hudson of The Band decided it was time to digitalize the Basement Tapes which he had recorded throughout 1967 while Bob Dylan was recuperating at Big Pink after his 1966 motorcycle accident. Many poor, unofficial copies of these recordings have been released over the years but never an authoritative edition. Twenty reels of quarter-inch tape contained 138 separate performances. Moore "mastered the set, transferring the originals." Garth Hudson reported that "Peter Moore with his incredible talent .... assembled and revived tape that had been crinkled, stretched." "Several reels were mouldy and Moore had to delicately unwind and re-spool some 1,800 feet of 'very, very thin' reel-to-reel tape by hand on a few others to 'flatten them out.'" The resulting product won wide critical acclaim and Moore won a Grammy Award for Best Historical Album in February 2016.

Moore died on November 11, 2023, at the age of 67. Singer-songwriter John Borra, Moore's friend and frequent collaborator, has announced the release of the Moore tribute album Last Dance at the E Room in fall 2025.
