= Margo Timmins =

Canadian singer (born 1961)

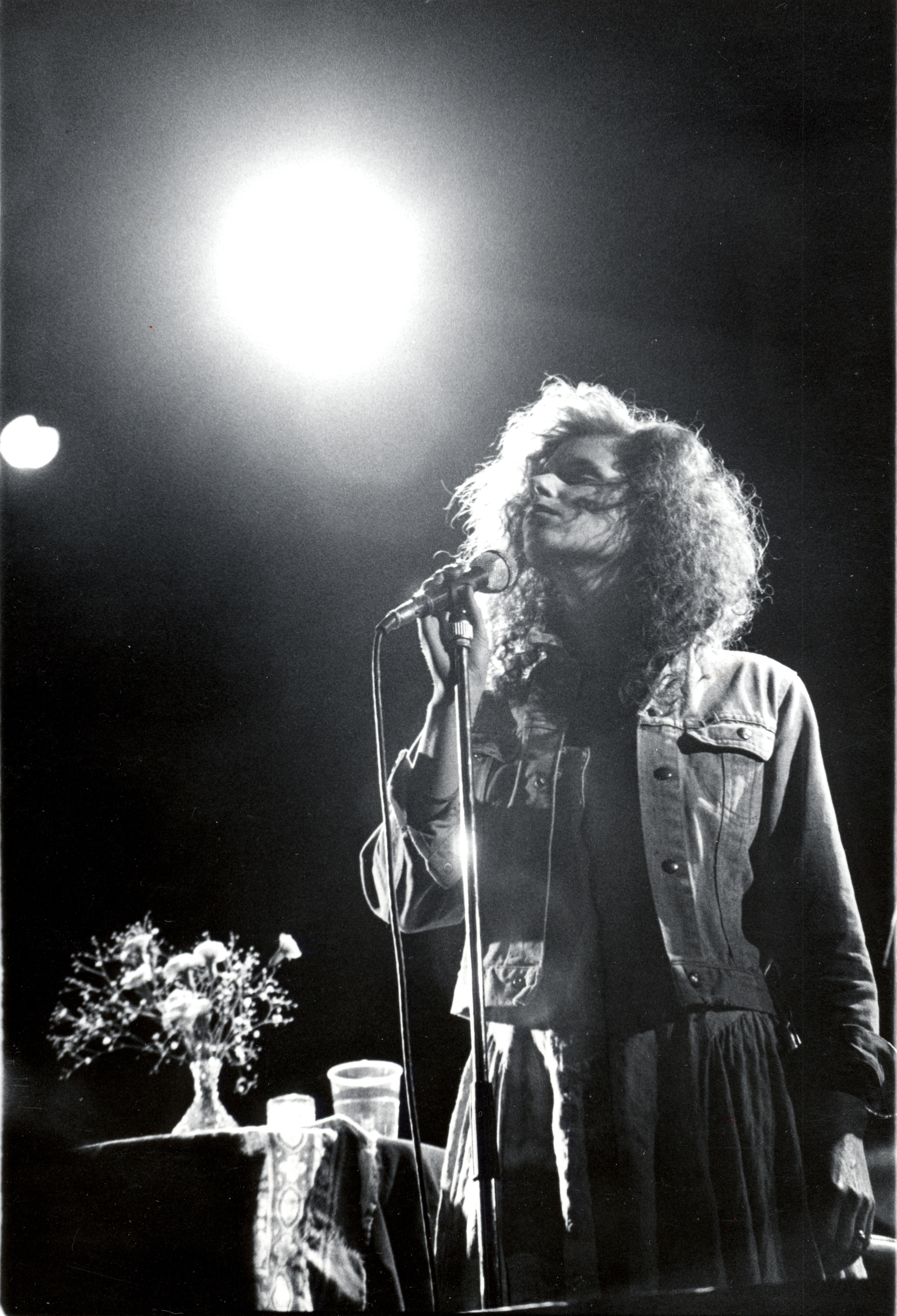
- Timmins performing with Cowboy Junkies in Japan

Background information
- Born: Montreal, Quebec, Canada
- Origin: Toronto, Ontario, Canada
- Occupations: Singer; composer
- Instrument: Vocals
- Years active: 1985–present
- Label: Latent Recordings
- Member of: Cowboy Junkies

Margo Timmins (born January 27, 1961) is a Canadian singer and songwriter. She is the lead vocalist of the folk rock band Cowboy Junkies. Her brothers Michael Timmins and Peter Timmins are the band's lead guitarist and drummer.

== Early life ==
Margo Timmins was born and spent most of her childhood in Montreal, one of six children of Barbara and John Timmins. Timmins' mother was a critical influence on her life and attitudes.

Timmins' father, who worked in aviation sales and marketing, was a jazz lover who passed this on to his daughter.

Timmins went through her brother Michael's record collection. Influences were: Highway 61 Revisited (1965); Blonde on Blonde (1966); Nashville Skyline (1969), by Bob Dylan; Nebraska (1982) by Bruce Springsteen; Harvest (1972) by Neil Young; Townes Van Zandt's Flyin' Shoes (1978).

In 1977, the Timmins family moved from Montreal to Toronto. They lived in the west of Etobicoke. Timmins went to Richview Collegiate Institute.

After graduating from high school, Timmins and her brother Michael explored the punk music scene in Toronto on Queen Street West. When Michael started his first band, the Hunger Project, she would hang out with the band, take the tickets, and carry the equipment.

Timmins earned money by doing clerical work for her father and performing chores around the house.

In her mid-20s, Timmins studied social work at university. In an interview with People she said, "As a kid I was always mistaken for a boy. I didn't get long hair until my early 20s. That's when I discovered hair was important."

== Cowboy Junkies ==
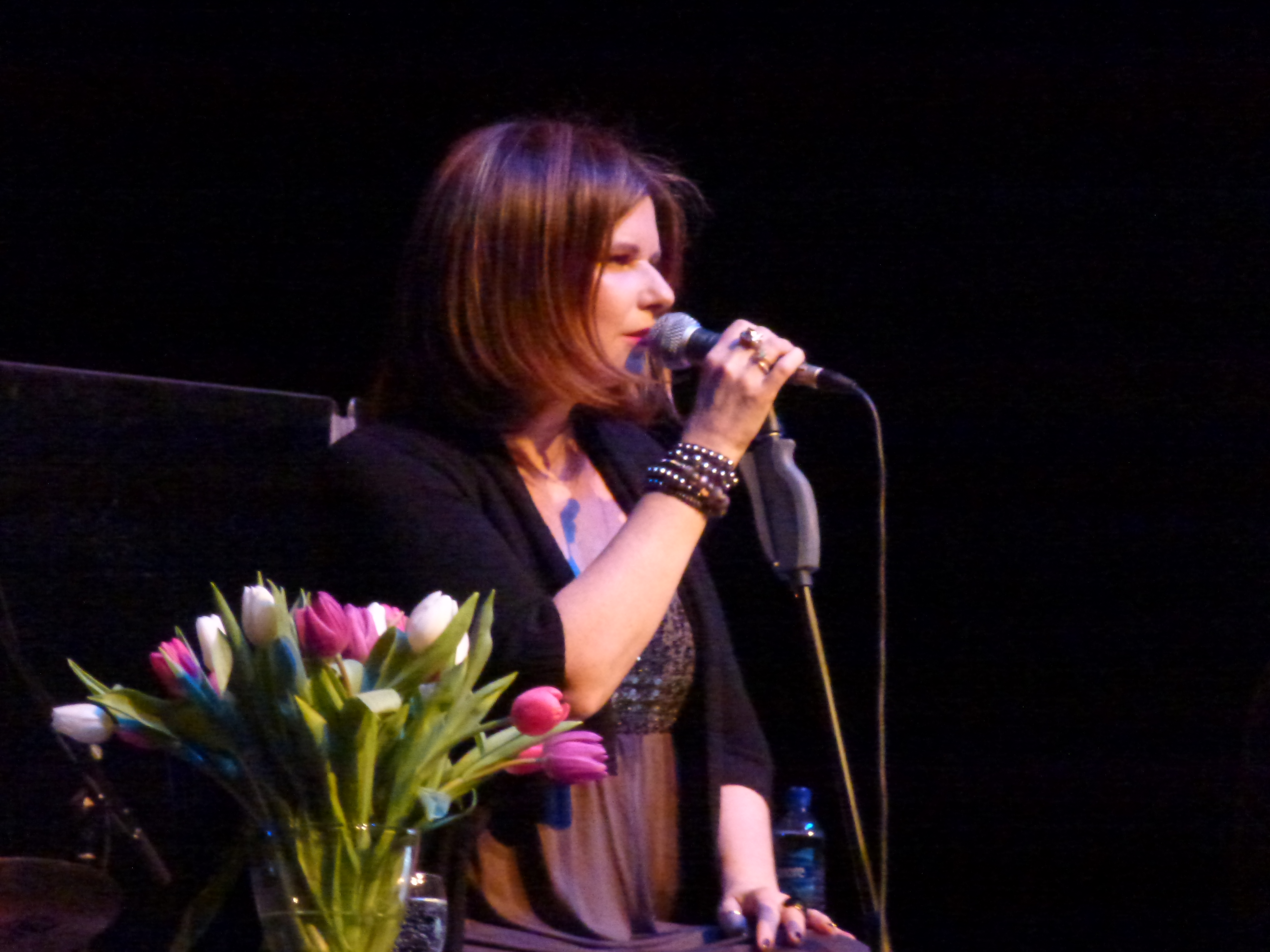
Timmins in a 2013 concert at Barbican; visible are the flowers she arranged before the concert to mitigate her stage fright

Michael Timmins, Margo's brother, formed the band Cowboy Junkies, with Margo's voice as a distinctive feature. Steve Leggett of AllMusic describes her voice as "ethereal". In 1985, her brother Michael recruited Margo as the lead vocalist for Cowboy Junkies even though she had never sung publicly before. Initially Margo would not sing in front of the other band members, she would only sing in front of Michael. Eventually, Michael convinced Margo to sing in front of the other band members and they liked her performance.

Margo Timmins has said about that time, "So when he asked me I was freaked out, but I said 'Okay, so long as if I don't do a good job, you fire me.' I didn't want to hurt his music, because his music is so important to him." It took a long time for her to get comfortable singing in front of an audience. In fact, many of the early shows had Margo singing with her back to the audience.

Timmins has stated that it took her ten years to get comfortable singing in front of an audience, and she suffers from stage fright.

== Personal life ==
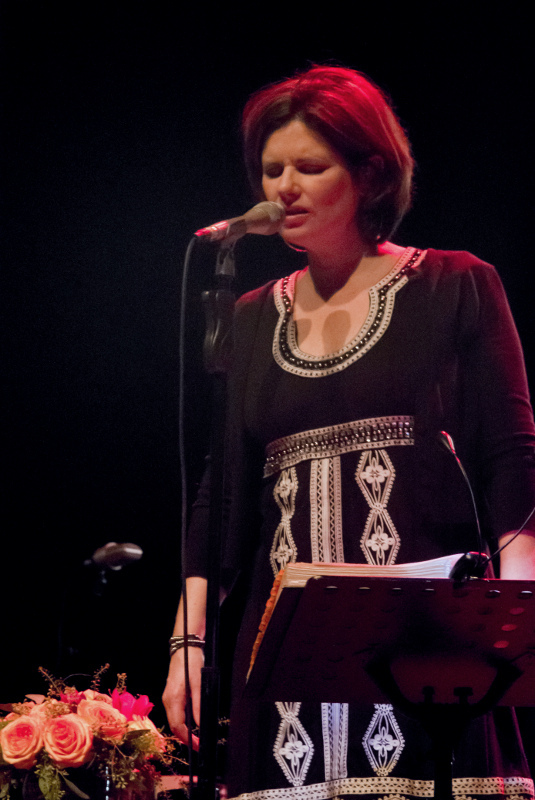
Timmins performing with Cowboy Junkies in Philadelphia, 2012

She lived in Toronto with her husband attorney Graham Henderson and their son as of 2004. However, the family also owned a 100-year-old farmhouse in Grey County, Ontario where they enjoyed much of their time. Henderson has represented Cowboy Junkies in legal matters.

She is a fan of Bruce Springsteen.

In 2009, she released a solo studio album of cover versions, Margo's Corner: Ty Tyrfu Sessions, Volume 1.

== Honours ==
In 2016, she was made a member of the Order of Ontario.
