= To Add One Meter to an Anonymous Mountain =

Work of art by Zhang Huan in 1995

To Add One Meter to an Anonymous Mountain (Chinese: 为无名山增高一米; pinyin: wèi wú míng shān zēng gāo yì mǐ) is a collective performance art work done by Chinese artist Zhang Huan in 1995. Ten Beijing East-Village artists, Wang Shihua, Cang Xin, Gao Yang, Zuoxiao Zuzhou, Ma Zongyin, Duan Yingmei, Zhu Ming, Ma Liuming, Zhang Binbin and Zhang Huan himself, laid their naked body on top of each other until they added another meter to the Miaofeng Mountain, which is on the outskirts of Beijing.

The work was originally photographed by Lv Nan. The ten artists involved in the work each kept a photographic negative that slightly differs from the other artists' negatives—either a participant faced a different direction or someone's leg lifted up a little.

== Social context ==
In the mid-1980s, under the influence of western modernist and postmodernist art forms which were introduced to China after the reform and opening up, a group of Chinese visual artists started to experiment with conceptual performance art. Through such art form, they showed their intention to “move out of the state-controlled gallery system” and "act out" their art in the public sphere.

In the early 1990s, an avant-garde artistic community called “the Beijing East-Village” emerged on the urban edge of Beijing. Living in shelters built up for migrant workers, the small group of artists from different parts of China gathered and created collaborative performance work in and around the area. Zhang Huan, Zhu Ming and Ma Liuming, the leading artists of the community, mainly focused their works on exploring and reflecting “gender, sexuality, and physical and psychological endurance.” To Add One Meter to an Anonymous Mountain is one of the performance works done by Zhang Huan during this time period.

== Creation ==
To Add One Meter to an Anonymous Mountain was created on May 11, 1995. According to Zhang Huan's associate Kong Bu, the project began at 13:00 with two surveyors, Jin Kui and Xiong Wen, setting up their equipment to measure the height of the Miaofeng Mountain, which was 86.393 meters. Then the ten naked artists lined up by ascending weight, and with the heaviest at the very bottom, they lay on top of each other in the form of a pyramid. The artists eventually constituted five layers: three people in the bottom layer, two people in each of the three middle layers, and one person lying at the top. In the meantime, the surveyors kept tracking the total height. Between 13:26 and 13:38 that afternoon, their measurement came to 87.394 meters, precisely one meter higher than the original height.

== Ideology ==
To Add One Meter to an Anonymous Mountain gains its meaning in the discussion of body art in modern China. According to Zhang Huan, the work explored a new approach to "feel and experience the existence of the body under the pressures of environment."

In a conversation with Art Journal, Zhang Huan said that the form of performance art is closely associated with his earlier life experience, in which he often found himself in physical conflict with the external world around him, both in terms of behaviors and dressing style. As a result, human body is used as the basic medium and language in the creation of To Add One Meter to an Anonymous Mountain. Through the physical contact of naked body and the environment, the inescapable nature of external pressure is embodied and the existence of "self" is emphasized. And such experience goes beyond a certain kind of personal feeling. As art historian Qian Zhijian said, the work also forced the audiences to be aware of the cruel reality as witnessed in Zhang Huan's performance.

== Public Reception ==
There are political readings about Zhang Huan's performance art. An audience of SFMOMA’s exhibition “Art and China after 1989” commented that To Add One Meter to an Anonymous Mountain reminded her of "the piles of dead, naked Jewish people in the Holocaust." After the 1989 Tiananmen Square protests, exhibitions of contemporary art were completely banned by Chinese officials until the late 1990s. From her point of view, the work captured Chinese people at their worst situation as they were under the oppression opinions that could happen to anybody, anywhere.

Many people also understand Zhang Huan’s work in a more spiritual manner. According to Yu Yeon Kim, an independent curator of many distinguished international exhibitions of contemporary art, To Add One Meter to an Anonymous Mountain deals with complex issues of identity, spiritualism, vulnerability, and transgression. She commented that "the spectrum of Zhang Huan’s performance art spans subjecting his flesh to extreme hardships to sly poetic alchemy." Zhuang Huan’s associate Kong Bu said that “the works of this period were extremely masochistic, showing Zhang Huan's abnormally excited posture and a wisdom and romanticism hinted at by his extreme bodily language.”

From 1996, Zhang Huan’s work continued to gain international attention and had chance to be displayed in various places overseas. To Add One Meter to an Anonymous Mountain received international acclaim at the 48th Venice Biennial in 1999 and is still considered "a monumental work in the history of Chinese performance art."

== Response ==
External image
- I Love Contemporary Art Too

Zuoxiao Zuzhou, one of the Beijing East-Village artists involved in To Add One Meter to an Anonymous Mountain, reproduced the performance art work in 2007 by replacing the nudity with pigs. The work is named I Love Contemporary Art Too (我也爱当代艺术), and is used as the cover of his 2008 album You Know Where the East Is.

In 2015, Zhang Huan and his associate Kong Bu were interviewed about their reflection on To Add One Meter to an Anonymous Mountain 20 years after the creation of the work. They told the interviewer that over the years, they found another layer of meaning contained in the work, which is the limitation of life: "when we left the mountain, it looked the same way before our arrival. We tried to add one meter to its height, but our effort turned out to be useless."
