= The Nomad Series =

Box set by Cowboy Junkies
- Released: April 17, 2017
- Genre: Alternative country, country rock, folk rock
- Length: 3:48:41
- Label: Latent, Razor & Tie, Diverse Records
- Producer: Michael Timmins

Cowboy Junkies chronology
The Wilderness (2012)	The Nomad Series (2017)	Notes Falling Slow (2015)

Professional ratings
Review scores
Source	Rating
AllMusic	4/5 stars
The Absolute Sound	4.5/5 stars

The Nomad Series is a box set by the Canadian alt-country band Cowboy Junkies, collecting the four individual albums of the Nomad series, Renmin Park, Demons, Sing in My Meadow, and The Wilderness on the first four discs, and, on the final disc, six of the seven songs from the Demons digital bonus disc plus four previously unreleased songs worked on during the creation of the series.

== Contents ==
Each individual album is unique, but tied together by the Nomad paintings series by Enrique Martinez Celaya, the maelstrom of creativity of creating four albums in eighteen months, and the unifying voice of Margo Timmins. The box set also includes a 50-page booklet containing the ephemera that makes up a recording, such as photos and lyrics. The box set was released as a digital release from the Junkies website, as a CD set, and as a vinyl set by Diverse Records, with a bonus 12" record that includes live tracks from At the End of Paths Taken which are not included in the CD box set, although those tracks along with one other were sold digitally as a bonus disc for Sing in My Meadow.

== Track listing ==
All tracks are written by Michael Timmins, except where noted.

Disc 1 - Renmin Park
No.	Title	Writer(s)	Length
1.	"Intro"		1:09
2.	"Renmin Park"		3:59
3.	"Sir Francis Bacon at the Net"	Michael Timmins, Alan Anton, Joby Baker	3:59
4.	"Stranger Here"		3:17
5.	"A Few Bags of Grain"	Michael Timmins, Alan Anton, Joby Baker	3:40
6.	"I Cannot Sit Sadly by Your Side"	Zuoxiao Zuzhou	4:59
7.	"(You've Got to Get) A Good Heart"	Michael Timmins, Alan Anton, Joby Baker	4:27
8.	"Cicadas"	Michael Timmins, Alan Anton, Joby Baker	5:17
9.	"Interlude"		0:48
10.	"My Fall"	Xu Wei	4:37
11.	"Little Dark Heart"		4:08
12.	"A Walk in the Park" (featuring Zuoxiao Zuzhou)	Alan Anton, Joby Baker, Zuoxiao Zuzhou	5:51
13.	"Renmin Park (Revisited)"		3:16
14.	"Coda"		0:54
Total length:			50:21

All tracks are written by Vic Chesnutt.

Disc 2 - Demons
No.	Title	Length
1.	"Wrong Piano"	4:30
2.	"Flirted with You All My Life"	3:46
3.	"See You Around"	5:53
4.	"Betty Lonely"	5:00
5.	"Square Room"	4:56
6.	"Ladle"	4:35
7.	"Supernatural"	3:37
8.	"West of Rome"	5:06
9.	"Strange Language"	2:51
10.	"We Hovered with Short Wings"	4:46
11.	"When the Bottom Fell Out"	2:53
Total length:		49:15

All tracks are written by Michael Timmins except where noted.

Disc 3 - Sing in My Meadow
No.	Title	Writer(s)	Length
1.	"Continental Drift"		5:06
2.	"It's Heavy Down Here"		5:09
3.	"3rd Crusade"	Michael Timmins, Alan Anton	4:13
4.	"Late Night Radio"		4:59
5.	"Sing in My Meadow"		4:28
6.	"Hunted"		4:29
7.	"A Bride's Price"	Michael Timmins, Alan Anton	5:51
8.	"I Move On"		6:01
Total length:			40:16

All tracks are written by Michael Timmins except where noted.

Disc 4 - The Wilderness
No.	Title	Writer(s)	Length
1.	"Unanswered Letter (for JB)"		5:21
2.	"Idle Tales"		4:06
3.	"We Are the Selfish Ones"		2:39
4.	"Angels in the Wilderness"		4:45
5.	"Damaged from the Start"		3:48
6.	"Fairytale"		4:23
7.	"Staring Man"	Michael Timmins, Elizabeth Bishop	4:01
8.	"The Confession of Georgie E"		6:00
9.	"I Let Him In"		4:13
10.	"Fuck, I Hate the Cold"		3:17
Total length:			42:33

Disc 5 - Extras
No.	Title	Writer(s)	Length
1.	"My Boy Burns"	Michael Timmins	4:47
2.	"The Girl Behind the Man Behind the Gun"	Michael Timmins	5:36
3.	"Old Hotel"	Vic Chesnutt	4:18
4.	"Marathon"	Vic Chesnutt	5:26
5.	"Punching Holes Through"	Michael Timmins	4:31
6.	"Sad Peter Pan"	Vic Chesnutt	3:51
7.	"Demons"	Michael Timmins	3:41
8.	"Guilty by Association"	Vic Chesnutt	3:26
9.	"Forthright"	Vic Chesnutt	7:11
10.	"Stay Inside"	Vic Chesnutt	4:51
Total length:			47:38

All tracks are written by Michael Timmins.

12" Vinyl bonus disc
No.	Title	Length
1.	"Spiral Down"	3:37
2.	"Follower 2"	6:27
3.	"My Little Basquiat"	5:50
4.	"Mountain"	5:57
Total length:		21:51
