= Aaron Goldstein (musician) =

Canadian musician, songwriter and record producer

- Born: May 8, 1983 (age 43); Toronto, Ontario, Canada
- Occupations: Musician, songwriter, producer
- Instruments: Pedal steel guitar, guitar, vocals
- Label: Latent

Aaron Goldstein (born May 8, 1983) is a Canadian musician, songwriter and record producer, best known for his performance on the pedal steel guitar.

Born in Toronto, Ontario, Goldstein first began playing the instrument in 2006 with encouragement of his bandmates in the Surly Young Bucks, which included member Max Kerman and Mike DeAngelis (currently of Arkells). His first recorded appearance on pedal steel was the 2007 LP Stars & Satellites by his former Surly Young Bucks bandmate Dan Griffin. In 2008, Goldstein toured the Canadian East Coast in Griffin's band The Regrets.

He is a member of the Tom Wilson-led collective Lee Harvey Osmond, playing on all three Polaris Prize-nominated studio releases, including the Juno-nominated Folk Sinner, and frequently touring as a member of the live band. In 2008, while recording with Lee Harvey Osmond, Goldstein formed his own band Huron. In Huron, Goldstein shared writing and singing duties with bandmate Cam Malcolm. Ian Blurton produced Huron's self-titled début and later toured with the group as the quintet Happy Endings.

Goldstein toured with Lee Harvey Osmond in 2010 opening for Cowboy Junkies in the Northeast US, and later joined Cowboy Junkies on the road to play pedal steel for three US tours in 2010. He also appears on two Cowboy Junkies records from that year, Renmin Park and Demons.

In 2010, Goldstein produced Harlan Pepper's self titled debut which was eventually released on Six Shooter Records. Other notable production works are Gleneagle's National Classic EP, Torero's self titled album, and Oxford Blue's Introducing (co-produced with Daniel Romano). Production projects which are complete but not yet released: Matt Paxton Let Me Rock and Roll Tonight EP.

He was named Guitarist of the Year at the 2010 Hamilton Music Awards. In 2011, he began his tenure in Daniel Romano's live band The Trilliums as Romano prepared to release Sleep Beneath the Willow.

In 2011, Goldstein began performing with City and Colour, joining Daniel Romano as a touring member. During a European tour he appeared on the limited release City and Colour Europe 2011. During City and Colour's downtime from touring, Goldstein was featured on Romano's Come Cry With Me record and subsequent tour.

Goldstein last performed with City and Colour in 2012. He spent much of the next two years touring for Come Cry With Me with Romano and working with Lee Harvey Osmond. Another Romano LP, If I've Only One Time Askin, was recorded in this period and was eventually released July 31, 2015.

In 2014, Goldstein began performing in Bry Webb's band, The Providers. He appears on the LP Free Will and live recording Live at Massey Hall and completed a national tour. Also in 2014, he recorded pedal steel on the Elliott Brood album Work and Love, produced by Ian Blurton, and toured with the band extensively.

== Selected discography ==
Release date	Artist	Album	Role
March 2007	Dan Griffin	Stars and Satellites	pedal steel
April 2, 2007	Foreign Films	Distant Star	pedal steel
May 11, 2009	Junior Boys	Begone Dull Care	pedal steel
June 9, 2009	Nick Rose	Oxbow Lake	pedal steel
September 8, 2009	Julie Fader	Outside In	pedal steel
September 15, 2009	Lee Harvey Osmond	A Quiet Evil	pedal steel
November 2009	Ian Blurton	Happy Endings	pedal steel
March 2010	Huron	Huron	guitar, vocal, pedal steel, songwriting
April 5, 2010	C'mon	Beyond the Pale Horse	pedal steel
May 3, 2010	Cowboy Junkies	Renmin Park	pedal steel
January 18, 2011	Cowboy Junkies	Demons	pedal steel
August 2011	Harlan Pepper	Young and Old	producer
September 13, 2011	Terra Lightfoot	Terra Lightfoot	pedal steel
October 2011	Arkells	Book Club (alternate version)	pedal steel
October 31, 2011	Slipfish	Beyond the Edge	pedal steel
September 25, 2012	Jenn Grant	The Beautiful Wild	pedal steel
October 2, 2012	Grey Kingdom	Light I'll Call Your Name Out Darkness	pedal steel
January 15, 2013	Lee Harvey Osmond	The Folk Sinner	pedal steel
January 22, 2013	Daniel Romano	Come Cry With Me	pedal steel
July 16, 2013	Eons	Arctic Radio	pedal steel
September 17, 2013	Zachary Lucky	Ballad of Losing You	pedal steel
May 20, 2014	Bry Webb	Free Will	pedal steel
September 16, 2014	Spencer Burton	Don't Let the World See Your Love	pedal steel
October 14, 2014	Weather Station	What Am I Going To Do With Everything I Know	pedal steel
October 21, 2014	Elliott Brood	Work And Love	pedal steel
April 7, 2015	Lee Harvey Osmond	Beautiful Scars	pedal steel
April 2015	The Sadies	Rarities, Oddities & Radio 1995-2015	pedal steel
May 26, 2015	Bry Webb	Live at Massey Hall	pedal steel
June 1, 2015	Torero	Torero	producer, pedal steel
July 31, 2015	Daniel Romano	If I've Only One Time Askin'	pedal steel
February 26, 2016	Donovan Woods	Hard Settle, Ain't Troubled	pedal steel
May 6, 2016	Joana Serrat	Cross The Verge	pedal steel
June 24, 2016	Adam Baldwin	No Telling When (Precisely Nineteen-Eighty-Five)	pedal steel
September 9, 2016	July Talk	Touch	pedal steel
September 23, 2016	Donovan Woods	They Are Going Away (EP)	pedal steel
October 7, 2016	Zachary Lucky	Everywhere A Man Can Be	producer, pedal steel
October 31, 2016	Ivan Rivers	Confidante (EP)	pedal steel
March 10, 2017	Richard Laviolette	Taking The Long Way Home	pedal steel
April 7, 2017	Wooden Sky	Swimming in Strange Waters	pedal steel
May 19, 2017	Andrew Hyatt	Iron and Ashes	pedal steel
May 19, 2017	Daniel Romano	Modern Pressure	pedal steel
