= Demons (Cowboy Junkies album) =

Studio album by Cowboy Junkies
- Released: January 18, 2011 (digital)
- Genre: Alternative country
- Length: 47:53
- Labels: Latent, Razor & Tie, Diverse Records
- Producer: Michael Timmins

Cowboy Junkies chronology
Renmin Park (2010)	Demons (2011)	Sing in My Meadow (2011)

Professional ratings
Review scores
Source	Rating
AllMusic	3.5/5 stars
Cover Me	3.5/5 stars
The Telegraph	3.5/5 stars
Rolling Stone	3/5 stars
PopMatters	9/10 stars

Demons is an album by the Canadian alt-country band Cowboy Junkies, released digitally on January 18, 2011 and physically on February 14, 2011. It contains eleven Vic Chesnutt covers. It is Volume Two of the Nomad Series.

== Album development ==
Vic Chesnutt died at age 45 on December 25, 2009, and Demons is the Junkies tribute album to him. The band had previously shown their respect for Chesnutt by including him in their twentieth anniversary celebration of The Trinity Session when they redid the album as Trinity Revisited, which included Chesnutt as one of the musicians, including taking the lead on one song, "Postcard Blues". He had also previously toured with the Cowboy Junkies several times, starting with the tour supporting Lay It Down. Michael Timmins stated about this album "One of the hopes of this album is that it inspires people to seek out the originals and keep his music alive. We had intended to do an album where he would write the songs, and we would be the band. Now we're trying to fulfill a bit of that desire." Chesnutt and the Junkies were planning on doing a collaborative album together, but Chesnutt died shortly before they could start recording. The Junkies then mined his previous work to showcase Chesnutt's personal demons that he laid out in his very honest song writing. The album may also be exorcising some of the Cowboy Junkies' demons as well. The Junkies turn an album born out of the death of their friend into an assertion of life. According to Michael Timmins, they approached the recording of the album with the same spirit that they felt Vic Chesnutt approached his. They let accidents happen, investing the "songs with the same spirit and the adventure with which they were written, at the same time investing them with our own Northern spin". Fifteen years earlier, the band had tried to cover one of Chestnutt's song, "West of Rome", but scrapped the project when they could not capture the sound they needed to give the song what it required. After Chestnutt's death, in the middle of their Nomad project, the Junkies were kicking around ideas of cover songs, and it occurred to them that Chestnutt was who they wanted to cover. The band did not want to just recreate Chestnutt's songs, but bring something to them. Margo got deep into the songs and figured out how to represent Chestnutt's voice. Michael Timmins believes that having fifteen more years to mature and gain insight allowed the band to grasp Chestnutt's work.

== Track listing ==
All tracks are written by Vic Chesnutt.

No.	Title	Length
1.	"Wrong Piano"	4:30
2.	"Flirted with You All My Life"	3:46
3.	"See You Around"	5:53
4.	"Betty Lonely"	5:00
5.	"Square Room"	4:56
6.	"Ladle"	4:35
7.	"Supernatural"	3:37
8.	"West of Rome"	5:06
9.	"Strange Language"	2:51
10.	"We Hovered with Short Wings"	4:46
11.	"When the Bottom Fell Out"	2:53
Total length:		49:15

Bonus digital tracks
No.	Title	Length
1.	"Stay Inside"	4:51
2.	"Old Hotel"	4:18
3.	"Withering"	2:43
4.	"Marathon"	5:26
5.	"Forthright"	7:11
6.	"Sad Peter Pan"	3:51
7.	"Guilty by Association"	3:26
Total length:		31:46

== Personnel ==
Cowboy Junkies

- Margo Timmins – vocals
- Michael Timmins – guitar, backing vocals
- Alan Anton – bass
- Peter Timmins – drums, percussion

Additional musicians

- Jeff Bird – mandolin
- Joby Baker – organ, piano, Wurlitzer, horn arrangement
- Aaron Goldstein – guitar
- Tania Elizabeth – fiddle
- Dave Henry – cello
- Henry Kucharzyk – woodwind arrangement
- Alfons Fear, Nick Lariviere, Roy Styffe – horn
- Bob Stevenson – clarinet
- Andy Maize – backing vocals

Production

- Michael Timmins – producer, engineer, mixed by
- Peter J. Moore – mastered at the E Room
- Peter Timmins – assistant
- Joby Baker – engineer, mixing
- Dave Henry – engineer
- Alice Phieu – graphics design
- Enrique Martinez Celaya – cover image
