= Bussiere Garden =

Coordinates: 40.061153°N 116.103216°E

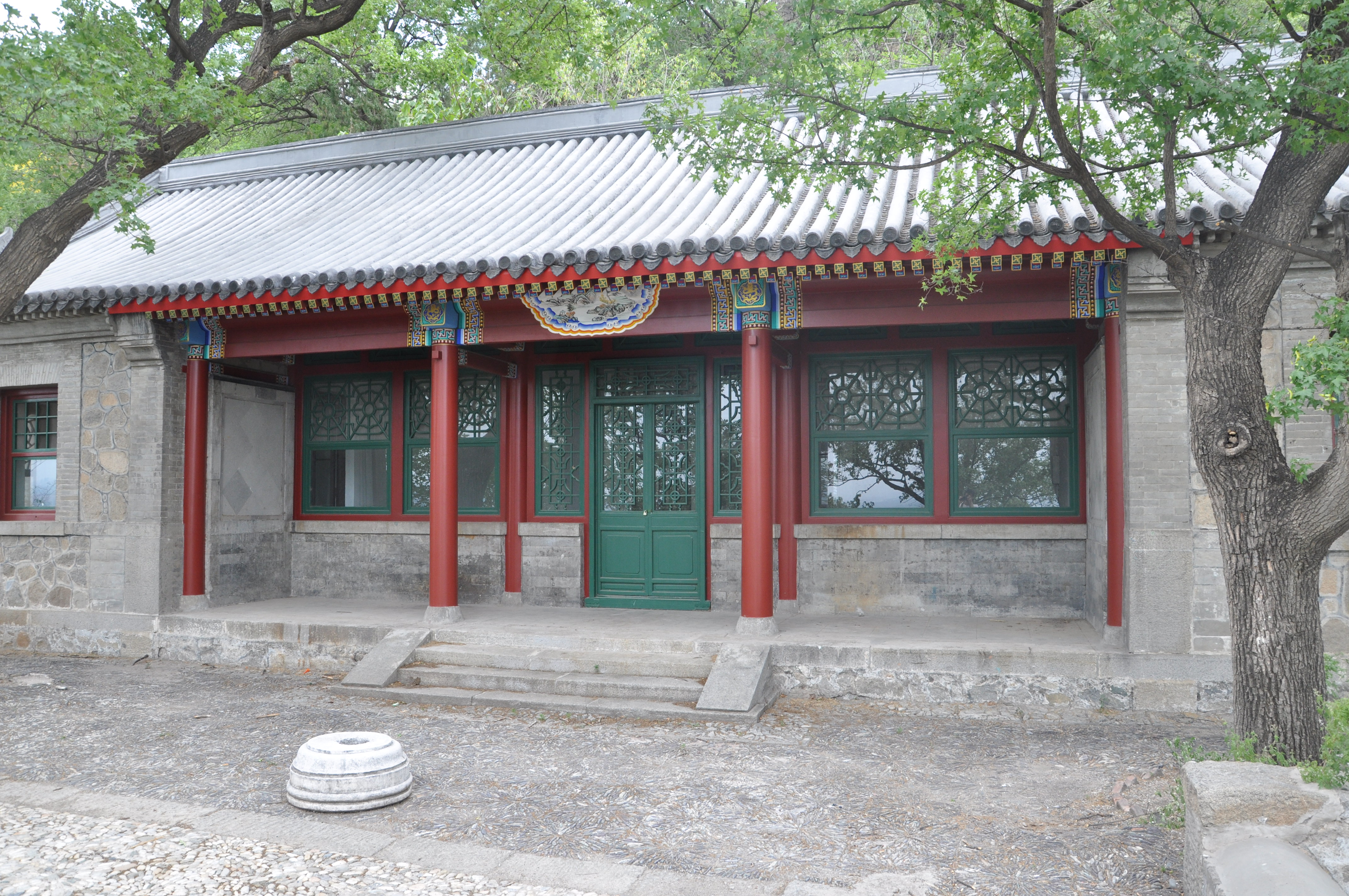
Bussiere Garden

Bussiere Garden, also called Jardin Bussière, located in the north of Sujiaguo Town, Haidian District of Beijing, was constructed by Doctor Jean-Augustin Bussière of Peking Union Medical College during the years in the Republic of China.

== History ==
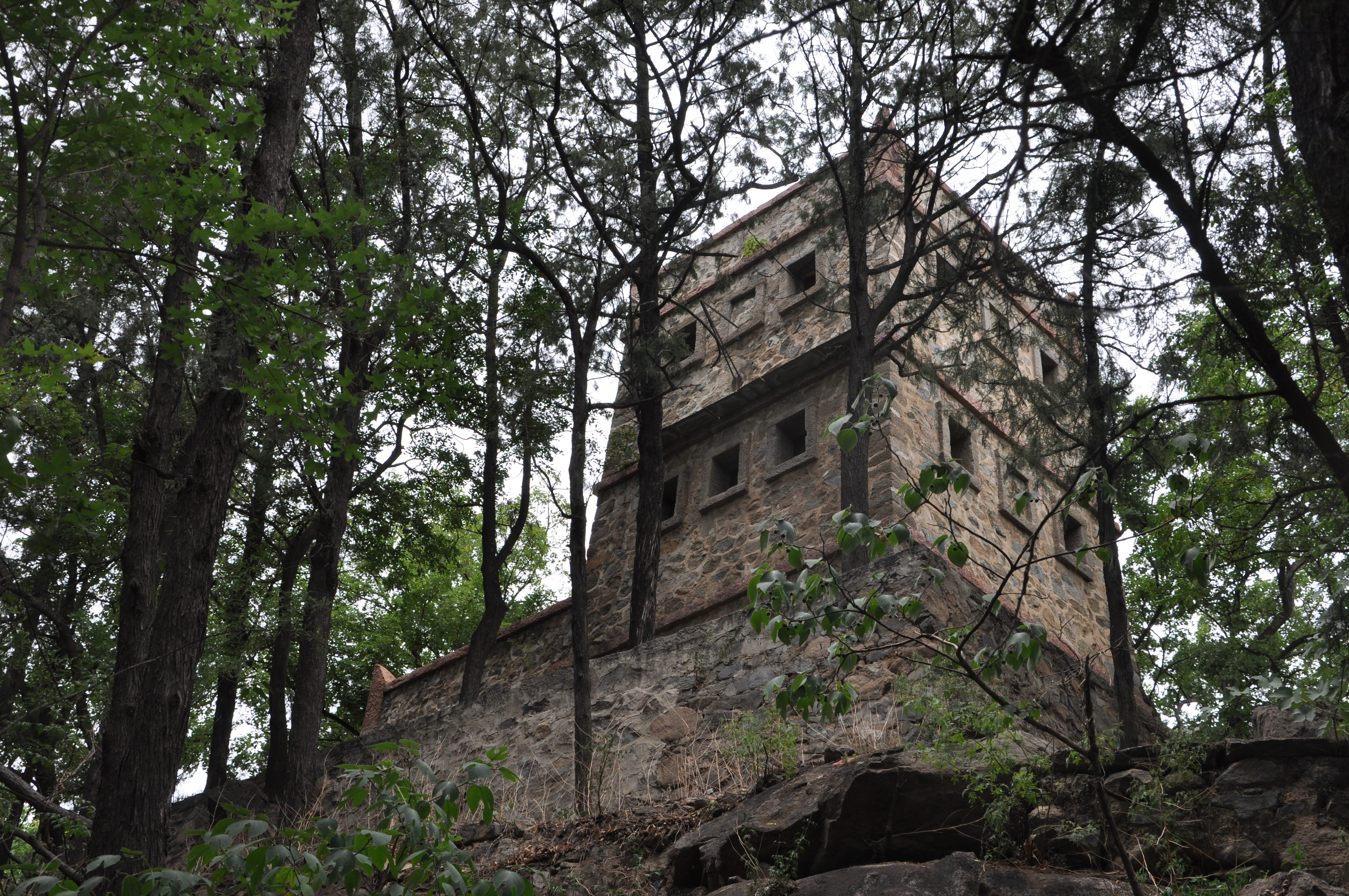
Bussiere Garden

Jean-Augustin Bussière (1872-1958), the owner of Bussiere Garden, came to Beijing in 1913 and practiced medicine there for 41 years. His aim was to purchase medical equipment from France and introduce advanced medical experience to China. He built a watchtower in his own villa Bussiere Garden as a place for local people to rest. His patients were of varied professions and social classes.

Bussière was a central figure in the French community in China and Bussiere Garden served as a social place for the French elite. The French poet Saint-John Perse, who later received the Nobel Prize in Literature, visited China accompanied by Bussiere. His long expressionist poem Anabase was written on the background of the desert and Mount Miaofeng. André d'Hormon, who had been proofreading the Chinese novel Dream of Red Mansions for more than ten years, was also a visitor of the mansion.

Bussiere Garden was once one of the Chinese Communist Party (CCP)'s underground intelligence interface locations of Pingxi. Before the Japanese invasion, Bussière's British friends delivered two high-power telegraph transmitters to Yan'an through Bussiere Garden. The CCP's headquarter of guerrilla forces in Mount Miaofeng was located than 100 meters from Bussiere Garden.

== Architecture ==
Bussiere Garden is a private garden with a combination of Chinese and Western elements. It comprises three parts: the barbican, the northern wing and the southern wing. Shade is provided by horse chestnut trees, Sophora japonica, ginkgo, elm, and other trees.

- The barbican: located outside the garden, it is a western style castle made of stones with three floors and sits toward the east. The walls of the castle were built with granite. By the main entrance there is a stone plaque that was made in 1936, which is inscribed with the message "To Practice Medicine to Save People". On the back of plaque is the year made and the statement, "Mr. Bussiere, outstanding in medical science, is famous across the world and is ready to help others. He was devoted to social affairs, which was known in the Wenquan Town if not everywhere. The words in Ode to Wenquan: to practice medicine to save people’s lives. Though taken out of the context, it fits Mr. Bussiere very well." This plaque was presented by Yao Tongyi and Li Shizeng (a couple)”. The barbican is used as a place for the treatment of local people.
- The northern wing: located on the mountainside and surrounded by hills, it is a Chinese style two-floor building with five rooms and East Asian hip-and-gable roof. On the front, there are a pond, wisteria, a fountain, and a stone bridge that is used as a resting and meeting place.
- The southern wing s the residence for Bussière’s daughter. Located on the hillside of south mountain and built with black brick, it faces east and has five rooms, three of which are exposed to the sun. There are also some outbuildings.

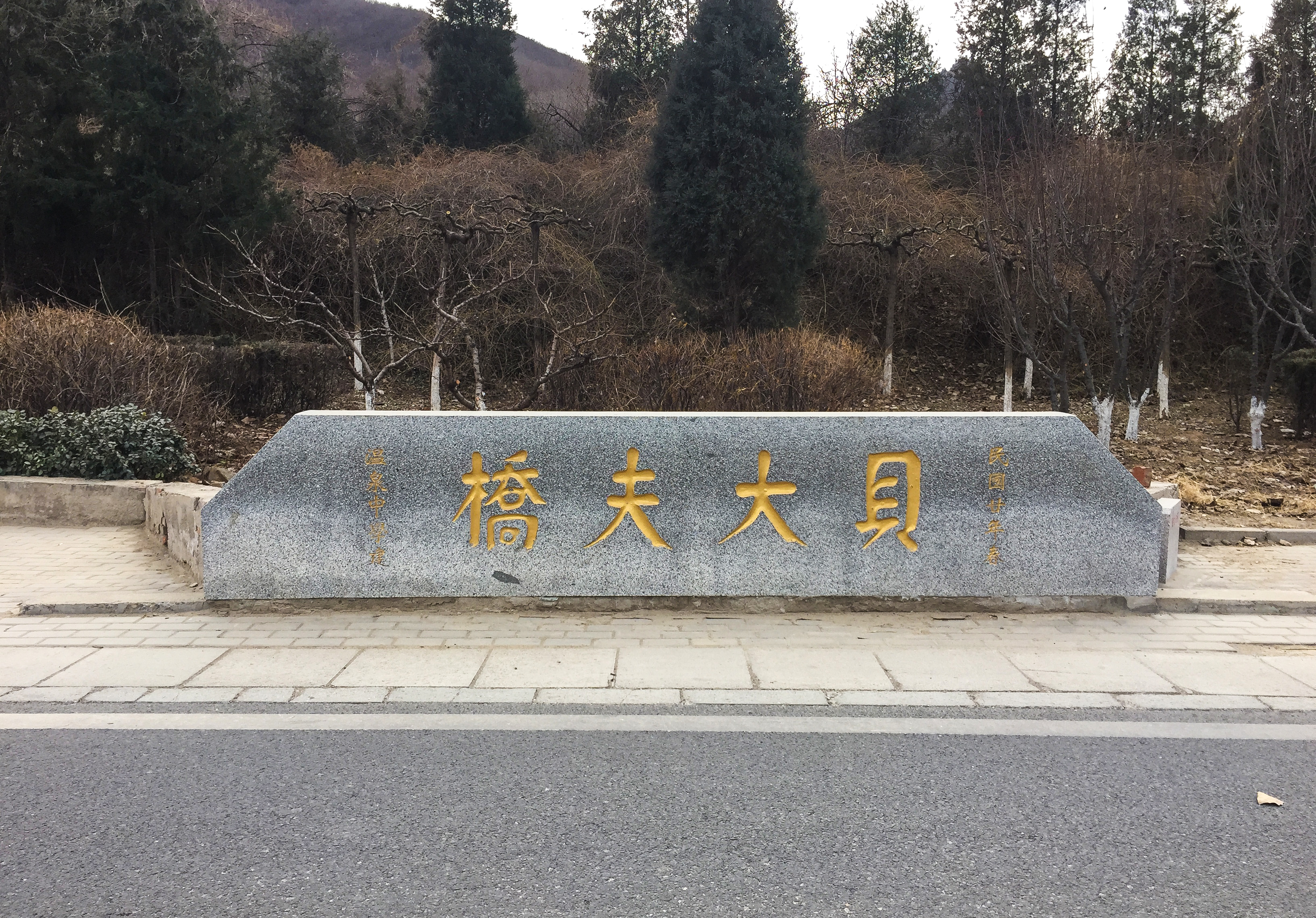
The Doctor Bussiere Bridge is located east of Nan'anhe Village

In addition, on the way from Wenquan to Bei’anhe, was a stone arch bridge that built in the spring of 1931 in the memory of Bussière. The words “Doctor Bussiere Bridge” were inscribed on the stone henge. During the highway expansion at the end of the 20th century, the stone henge was abandoned and lost. At the end of 2013, the local government reconstructed the stone henge on its original site. But the original small river was filled up as roadbed in the reconstruction.

In 2001, Bussiere Garden was announced as a key cultural relics protection unit by the Haidian District Government. In 2011, it was also published as the Beijing municipal historical and cultural sites under government protection. In 2014, on the 50th anniversary of diplomatic relations between China and France, the renovation of Bussiere Garden complex was completed.

== Jean-Augustin Bussière ==
Bussière (1872-1958) was a doctor of the French legation in Beijing, which also serving as the trustee and president of the branch college of Aurora University. Bussiere married a Chinese woman named Wu Sidan and embraced the Chinese culture. He often wore robes and spent time learning Chinese, eating Chinese food and studying painting and calligraphy.

During the Second Sino-Japanese War, Bussière, was the president of a hospital in China and made his way to the battle front as a volunteer to treat the wounded Eighth Route Army soldiers and the local rural people. He also delivered medical supplies to the front. Once, starting from Peking city, he rode a bicycle loaded with medicinal materials for more than 30 kilometers to the area near Western Hills. Later, he also purchased cars for the transportation of medicinal materials and equipment from Japanese-occupied areas to the Shanxi-Chahar-Hebei border area occupied by the Eighth Route Army.

Su Yi said: "Mr. Bussière is a true hero of the international anti-fascist movement and is a true friend of the Chinese people. His story shall be remembered by us and the generations to come." In April, 2014, the General Secretary of the Chinese Communist Party Xi Jinping gave a speech during his visit to France: "We will never forget that countless French friends have made an important contribution to our cause. Some of them, with the risk of their lives, opened up a 'The Hump', though which precious medicine was transported to the anti-Japanese base areas in China by people like Mr. Bussière……"

In 1954, Bussière, who was 82 years old, returned to France. The following year, his wife gave birth to a son named Jean Louis Bussière. Just like his father, he is also a doctor and later become a Cardiologist and was called “Bussiere Junior” by the Chinese people. At the end of April 2014, Bussiere Junior had visited Beijing and attended the opening ceremony of the documentary series The history of Bussiere Garden, which was held in Bussiere Garden. On November 8, 2014, Bussiere Garden—A French doctor in Beijing exhibition and Bright Light—The Old Summer Palace cultural exhibition were held in Paris simultaneously, which were presented as a gift to the 50th anniversary of diplomatic relations between China and France.Bussiere Garden—A French doctor in Beijing exhibition was launched by Beijing Media and Communications Department and the International Communication Office on the background of Bussiere Garden. It consists of three parts：Doctor, Neighbor and Friend and displays the 41 years’ life experience of Dr. Bussière in China. The exhibition lasted to November 16.
