= Majoros =

Majoros is a Hungarian surname that may refer to the following notable people:

- Árpád Majoros (born 1983), Hungarian football midfielder
- Bill Majoros, Canadian rock musician
- István Majoros (born 1974), Hungarian wrestler
- Jozef Majoroš (born 1970), Slovak football coach and former player
- Jozef Majoroš (footballer, born 1978), Slovak football coach
- Majka (rapper) (born Péter Majoros in 1979), Hungarian rapper, songwriter and television host

== See also ==
- Majoro
