= Huron (Canadian band) =

Canadian rock band

- Origin: Hamilton, Ontario, Canada
- Genres: Rock
- Years active: 2008–present
- Labels: Latent
- Members: Cam Malcolm; Aaron Goldstein; Adam Melnick; Peter Hall
- Website: latentrecordings.com/huron

Huron is a Canadian rock band from Hamilton, Ontario. Members include pedal-steel player/guitarist Aaron Goldstein, known for his session work with Cowboy Junkies, and Cam Malcolm, who was previously in the band Sweet Homewreckers, bassist Adam Melnick, and drummer Pete Hall who was also a founding member of A Northern Chorus.

== History ==
Huron was formed in January 2008 in Hamilton. The band worked with record producer Ian Blurton for their debut album, which was released on Latent Recordings in March 2010. The album received positive reviews from Exclaim magazine and Metro News.

Huron was also the backup band for Blurton's solo album Happy Endings, They performed with him at live shows to promote the album, including participation in Canada Music Week.

== Members ==
- Cam Malcolm – guitar, stripping
- Aaron Goldstein – guitar, vocals, pedal steel guitar
- Adam Melnick – bass guitar, organ, vocals
- Peter Hall – drums, moaning

== Discography ==
- 2010 – Huron
- 2010 – Happy Endings (Ian Blurton)
