= Lee Harvey Osmond =

Canadian band

LeE HARVeY OsMOND
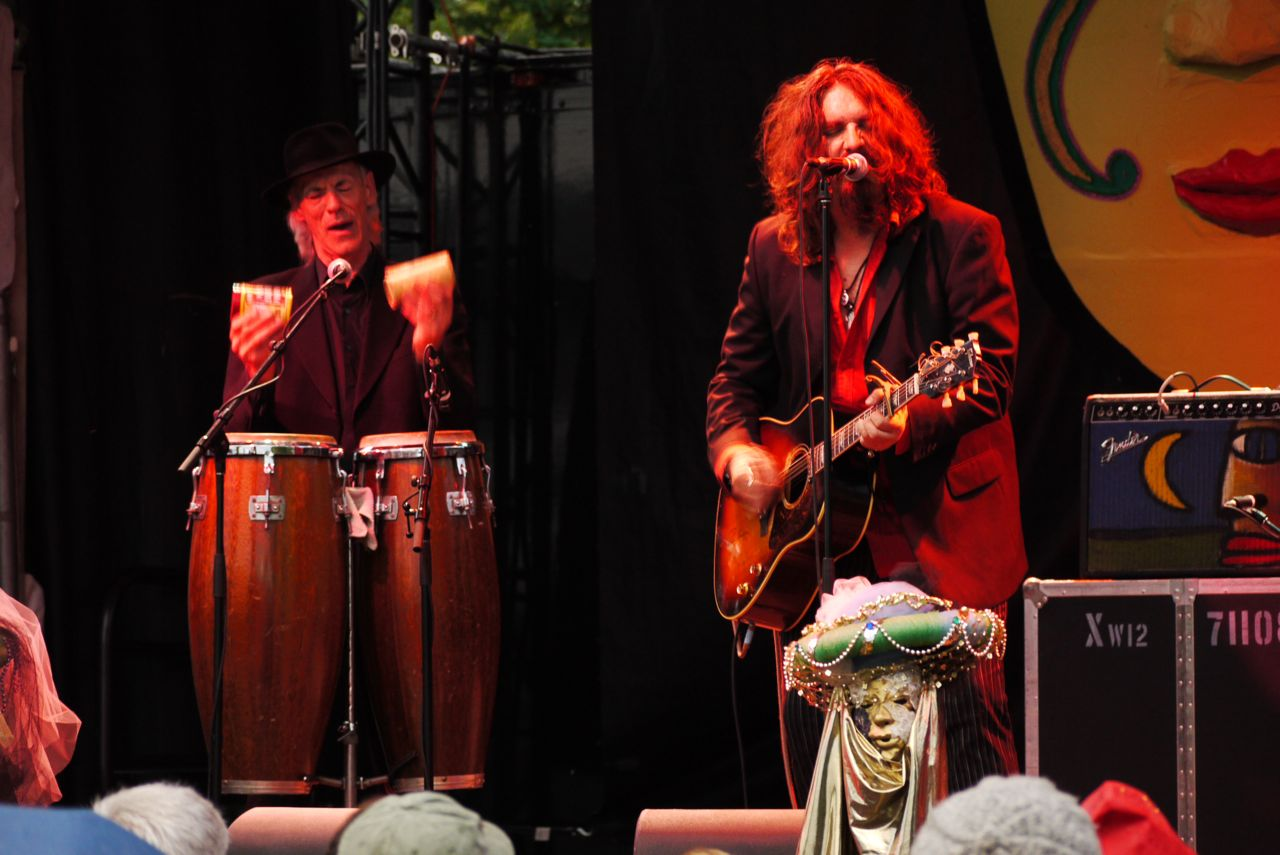
- Lee Harvey Osmond performing in 2009

Background information
- Born: Thomas Cunningham Wilson
- Origin: Ontario, Canada
- Genres: Psychedelic folk
- Years active: 2009–present
- Label: Latent

Lee Harvey Osmond, stylized as LeE HARVeY OsMOND, is a Canadian psychedelic folk project fronted by musician Tom Wilson.

== History ==
The act first took shape with Wilson in his LeE HARVeY OsMOND persona, backed by Michael Timmins of Cowboy Junkies and Josh Finlayson of Skydiggers. They wrote, recorded and released the debut album, A Quiet Evil, in 2009 on Latent Recordings. Margo Timmins, Andy Maize and Suzie Vinnick also contributed to the album. The band's current touring configuration consists of Wilson on lead vocals and guitar, Aaron Goldstein on guitar and pedal steel (who also contributed to A Quiet Evil), Cam Malcolm on bass guitar, Brent Titcomb on percussion and vocals and Ray Farrugia on drums.

A Quiet Evil was a long-listed nominee for the 2010 Polaris Music Prize.

Their second album, The Folk Sinner, was released on January 15, 2013. In June 2013, the album was long-listed for the 2013 Polaris Music Prize. The Folk Sinner was nominated for a Juno Award in the Roots & Traditional Album of the Year – Group category at the Juno Awards of 2014.

A third album, Beautiful Scars, was released on April 7, 2015. Many of the songs on the album were co-written and performed with other musicians. It was longlisted for the 2015 Polaris Music Prize.

The band's fourth studio album, Mohawk, was released in 2019. The album was longlisted for the 2019 Polaris Music Prize. It won a 2020 Juno Award for Juno Award for Contemporary Roots Album of the Year.

== Discography ==
- A Quiet Evil (2010)
- The Folk Sinner (2013)
- Beautiful Scars (2015)
- Live from Latent Lounge (digital only) (2017)
- Mohawk (2019)
