= Majoro =

Majoro is an African surname. Notable people with the surname include:

- Lehlohonolo Majoro (born 1986), South African footballer
- Moeketsi Majoro (born 1961), Lesotho economist and politician

== See also ==
- Majoros
