= Ma Liuming =

Chinese painter

Ma Liuming (Chinese: 马六明, born 1969 in Huangshi, Hubei province) is a contemporary Chinese painter active in performance art. He is known most of all for his exploration of the power and poetry of public nudity in China, where such behavior was strictly forbidden. As a result, he has been the target of government censorship, unable to perform in his own country for most of his career.

In 1981, Ma Liuming started to study oil painting with tutor Cai Erhe. He graduated from Hubei Institute of Fine Arts in 1991 (MFA) in the Oil Painting Department. Two years later, he was one of the founders of Beijing East Village, an artists colony on the outskirts of Beijing. In the early 1990s it became a nexus for experimental art forms. One of Ma Liuming's first performances was called "Fen-Ma Liuming's Lunch 1", a collaboration with Zhang Huan and Zhu Ming in 1994. He sat, completely nude, sucking a plastic tube that was attached to his penis. In 1994 Ma Liuming was arrested for a period of two months because of works like this. Many of the artists of the Beijing East Village fled in response to this police action.

In order to match his own uniquely androgynous appearance Ma Liuming developed his own performance persona – Fen-Ma Liuming, a hybrid figure of male and female components.

Next to performances painting is a key component in his works. Since 2000, he has developed his "Baby series", in which the face of Fen-Ma Liuming appears on infant's bodies. It is a surrealistic image that is both disturbing and laughable. Through different mediums such as performance, painting and photography Ma Liuming continues to investigate the limits of provocation, seducing his audience into considering more intriguing matters.

== Fen-Ma Liuming ==
Fen-Ma Liuming (芬-马六明) was the name Ma Liuming gave to distinguish his performance from himself. Fen-Ma Liuming was a transgender creation with woman's face and dresses but has a man's body. The initial idea of Fen-Ma Liuming was born in the 1990s when Ma was still an undergraduate in Hubei Academy of Fine Arts. Ma used to wrap his naked body with plastic wrap while modeling for student to do the life drawing, later on, Ma considered this as his first performance.

In 1993, Ma quit his job and moved to the Beijing artists' colony known as the East Village to start his career as a contemporary Chinese painter and pioneer of Chinese performance art. Although the living condition in the East Village was tough, Ma and his colleagues expressed their passion and creativity to contemporary art during this time period. At the end of Ma's first year in the East Village, two British visitors came to the village and had huge impact on Ma, perhaps changed the current of his life. The openly gay artistic couple, Gilbert and George, inspired Ma to turn to performance art as the main medium of his artistic expression.

One night, Ma was persuaded by his friends to wear woman's make-up and clothes. When the time Ma saw the sight of himself in the mirror, he was shocked. According to his words: I felt frightened, but also felt that I was ready for a bigger change. So I changed my clothes, and dressed in a girl's long skirt. I had the idea to create art using only make-up and my body. This was the birth of Fen-Ma Liuming.

Since that was the early time period of the 1990s, nude performance was appalling for the public. In 1994, Ma was arrested by police when he was doing the performance in the East Village. During the time Ma was in prison, he became famous in the Chinese contemporary art world and his work- Fen Ma Liuming was interpreted as a political symbol. After two months, Ma was released and sent back to Beijing.

This event changed Ma's performing style in a dramatic way. Before his arrest, Fen-Ma Liuming expressed the duality of pleasure with cruelness, and mercy following tragedy. But after Ma was released, the expression of the performance became the concern of the life and society, which is the unsafe and dangerous emotion he had at that time.

In 1996, Fen-Ma Liuming had its first show outside China at the 1996 Tokyo International Performance Art Festival. In a dark performance hall, Fen-Ma Liuming lit matches one by one to illuminate different parts of his body. When the theatre lights came finally came up, he presented himself fully with a woman's face and a man's body. According to his own word: In China, performance art was underground, and the conditions were simple and rough. In art festivals outside China, the partners were professional, and we went over every detail. After talking with some overseas artists, my views and thoughts changed.

After the show in Tokyo, Fen-Ma Liuming executed "Fen-Ma Liuming Walks the Great Wall", a performance in which the artist walked along an unspecified segment of the Great Wall without any clothes on. Shing-Kwan Chan argues that the performance was staged on a historical site constructed to divide and segregate, which, in a way, symbolically represents the dichotomous gender division of male and female.

After the late 1990s, Fen-Ma Liuming was welcomed by most performance art festivals and art exhibitions. In a performance in Lyon, France in 2001, Ma took some sleeping pills and rendered himself motionless. Then the audiences were invited to come on stage and take photo with Fen-Ma Liuming. The idea of this sleeping version of Fen-Ma Liuming is to blur the boundary between man and woman, self and non-self. The final performance of Fen-Ma Liuming was at the 2002 Asia Performance Art Festival in Fukuoka, Japan. Ma said: I hope Fen-Ma Liuming will remain in a kind of beautiful permanent, ageless state. But now my body language no longer has the characteristics of Fen-Ma Liuming.

== Oil painting ==
Oil Painting

Most of Ma Liuming's oil paintings are all about Fen-Ma Liuming. In the canvases, Fen-Ma Liuming was portrayed as an infant with big head and fat baby hands. After Ma stopped his performance, he started a new series of works. In Ma's new works, a contorted human being appears against a dark color background. Concerning this series of painting, Ma explained: When my son opened his eyes at the very first time, if he saw my paintings, this is what he would have seen.

== Selected exhibitions and performances ==
- 2008
  - Avant-Garde China: Twenty Years of Chinese Contemporary Art The National Art Center, Tokyo/The National Museum of Art, Osaka/Aichi Prefectural Museum of Art Japan
- 2007
  - Marella Gallery, 798 Factory, Beijing, China (solo)
  - A Brief Introduction of Ma Liuming, Galería Dolores de Sierra, Madrid, Spain (solo)
  - Art Taipei 2007, Star 85 Art Space, Taipei, Taiwan
  - Three Language Three Colors, UM Gallery, Korea
  - Political Art, The State Tretyakov Gallery, Moscow
  - Timerol, Intimacy, Triennale, Milan, Italy
  - Dragon's Evolution, New York China-Square Art Center, USA
  - Art Now – Shanghai, Beijing Art Now Gallery (Shanghai Station)
  - Photography of Performance in China, Ying Gallery, 798 Factory, Beijing, China
- 2006
  - The Great Performance, Max Protech Gallery, New York, USA (group)
  - Long March Capital, Long March Space, Factory 798, Beijing, China (group)
  - 2006 China Contemporary Art Festival, Korea (group)
  - A Point in Time, Wuhan City Fine Arts Literature, Wuhan, China (group)
  - Ma Liuming, Marella Gallery, Milan, Italy (solo)
  - Ma Liuming, Ma Liuming in Seoul, South Korea (solo)
  - Jiang Hu, Tilton Gallery, New York, U.S.A (group)
  - Re-Excavate the Contemporary Realism, Soka Art Center, Beijing, China (group)
  - Process & Expression, Star 85 Gallery, Taipei, Taiwan (group)
  - Unclear and Clearness – Contemporary Chinese Art, Korea
  - Artside Gallery, Seoul, Korea (solo)
  - Marella Gallery, Milan, Italy (solo)
  - Art Taipei 2006, Taipei, Taiwan
- 2004–2006
  - Between Past and Future: New Photography and Video From China, The Venice Biennale, Venice, Italy; Seattle Art Museum, Seattle, USA; Smart Museum of Art, Chicago, USA; Museum of Contemporary Art, Chicago, USA; International Center for Photography, New York, USA
- 2005
  - Ma Liuming: Chosen Images, Aura Gallery, Shanghai, China
  - Mahjong, Kunstmuseum Bern, Bern, Switzerland
  - China, Palazzo Saraceni and San Giogio in Poggiale, Bologna, Italy
  - Dream Producers (II/VI): The Imaginary Museum of Chinese
  - Contemporary Art, Xin Dong Cheng Space for Contemporary Art, Factory 798, Beijing
  - Prague Biennale 2, Prague
  - The Gesture. A Visual Library in Progress, Macedonian Museum of Contemporary Art, Greece
  - The Strange Heaven-Contemporary Chinese photography, Finland
  - Ma Liuming, Gallery Albert, Paris, France (solo)
  - Ma Liuming, Beijing Art Now Gallery, Beijing, China (solo)
  - Ma Liuming Performance Chosen Images, Aura Gallery, Shanghai, China (solo)
  - Modern Art of China- Sigg Collection, Berne, Switzerland (group)
  - The Wall, Beijing, USA (group)
  - Mayfly, Beijing Commune, Beijing, China (group)
  - Gallery Albert, Paris, France
  - Beijing Art Now Gallery, Beijing, China
- 2004
  - "No Body's Fool No Body's Hurt" Aura Gallery, Shanghai, China
  - "If You are Collector" Aura Gallery Shanghai, China
  - "Illusion" Aura Gallery Shanghai, China
  - "Me Me Me! – Part I"Ccourtyard Gallery, Beijing, China
  - "Face to Face" Aura Gallery, Shanghai, China
  - China, The body Everywhere, Museum of Contemporary Art, Marseille, France (group)
  - Forbidden Senses ? Espace Culturel François Mitterrand de Périgueux, Ancien Eveche de Sarlat, France (group)
  - Examining My Own Practice, London, UK (group)
  - Camera / Action : Performance and Photography, Museum of Contemporary Photography, Chicago, USA (group)
  - Fen-Ma Liuming, Top Space, Tai Kang Life Building, Beijing, China (solo)
  - Me, Me, Me: Courtyard Gallery, Beijing, China
  - Top Space, Tai Kang Life Building, Beijing, China (solo)
  - "Ten Years Review of Ma Liuming's Works", Top Space, Tai Kang Life Building, Beijing, ChinaChina
- 2003
  - Ma Liuming, Soobin Art Gallery, Singapore
  - "Any Day", performance at Fukuoka Asian Art Museum, Fukuoka, Japan
  - Ma Liuming, Chinese Contemporary Gallery, London, UK (solo)
  - "China Art Now-out of the Red" Marella Arte Contemporanea, Milano, Italy (photographs and video of performances) Traveling exhibition: Trevi Flash Art Museum
  - "Summer 03" Chinese Contemporary Art Gallery, London
  - Corps de Chine, Gallery Anne Lettree, Paris
  - Femmes de Chine, Gallery Veronique Maxe, Paris
  - Entre de Chine _ Chine et mutations, |uvres vidéo d'artistes contemporains chinois . au Palais de l'Ile – Annecy, magespassages, France
  - The Reencounters d'Arles Festival, Arles, France
  - The Strange Heaven-Contemporary Chinese photography, Gallery Rudolfinum, Prague
  - Peripheries Become the Center, Prague Biennale 1 2003
  - Bare Androgyny, Beijing, China
- 2002
  - International Exhibitionist, Curzon Soho Cinema, London, England
  - Reinterpretation: A Decade of Experimental Chinese Art 1990–2000 The First Guangzhou Triennial, Guangzhou, China
  - Ma Liuming Zeit-Foto Salon, Japan (solo)
  - Translated Acts Museo de Arte Carrillo Gil (Carrillo Gil Museum), Mexico City
  - The 2nd Pingyao International Photography Festival: Chinese's New Photography, China
  - When It Rains It Pours, DDM, Shanghai, China
  - Art Moscow, Moscow, Russia
  - Paris-Pekin, Paris, France
  - New Photography from China, CourtYard Gallery, Beijing, China
  - New Expression of Korean and Chinese Painting 2002
  - Seoul Arts Center, Seoul, Korea
  - Chinese Modernity, Fondation Armando Alvares Penteada, São Paulo, Brazil
  - Ma Liuming, Soobin Art Gallery, Singapore (solo)
  - New photography from China, CourtYard Gallery, Beijing
  - "Photographs and Videos of Performances", Soobin Art Gallery, Singapore
- 2001
  - Queens Museum of Art, New York, USA
  - Art Moscow, Moscow, Russia
  - New Expression of Korean and Chinese Painting 2002, Seoul Arts Center, Seoul, Korea
  - Chinese Modernity, Foundation Armando Alvares Penteada, São Paulo, Brazil
  - Performance at Les Subsistancestm, Part of festival Polysonneries, Lyon, France
  - Performance at Dilston Grove Church, Part of Span 2 International Performance Art, London
  - Ma Liuming, Tensta Konsthalll, Sweden (solo)
  - Fen-Ma Liuming in Montreal, Performance at Studio 303, Part of Festival Art Action Actual, Montreal, Canada (solo)
  - Performance at Studio 303, Part of Festival Art Action Actual, Montreal, Canada
  - Haus der Kulturen der Welt, Berlin, Germany; travelled to Queens Museum of Art, New York, NY, USA
  - On Boys and Girls, Upriver Loft, Kunming, Yunnan, China
  - Ma Liuming, Gallery Q, Tokyo, Japan (solo)
  - Translated Acts, Haus der Kulturen der Welt, Berlin
  - Traveling exhibition: Translated Acts, 16 October----1 February 2002 Queens Museum of Art, New York
  - Hot Pot, Kunstnernes Hus, Oslo, Norway
  - EGOFUGAL, The 7th International Istanbul Biennial, Istanbul
  - Naked, Wood Street Gallery, Pittsburgh, U.S.A
- 2001–1996
  - Series of performances entitled "(Fen-)Ma Liuming in …", all over the worldChina
- 2000
  - Man and Place, Kwangju Biennial 2000, Korea
  - Time of Reviving, Exhibition of Contemporary Chinese Art in 2000, UPRIVER GALLERY, China
  - Utopia, International Exhibition at Rogaland Kunst Museum, Norway (group)
  - The Figure: Another Side of Modernism, Snug Harbor Cultural Center, New York, USA
  - Our Chinese Friends, ACC Gallery Weimar / Neudeli-Gallerie der Bauhaus (in collaboration with Gallerie Urs Meile Lucerne), Germany
  - Chinese Performance, JGM Gallery, Paris, France
  - Manly, Art in General, New York, USA
- 1999
  - Pink for Boys / Blue for Girls, NGBK, Berlin, Germany
  - Aperto over All, The 48th Venice Biennale, Venice, Italy
  - Fen-Ma Liuming in London – Chinese Contemporary Gallery, London, United Kingdom
  - Chinese Contemporary Gallery, London, UK (solo)
  - Fen-Ma Liuming, part of "Inside Out: New Chinese Art" at the San Francisco Museum of Modern Art, San Francisco, USA
  - San Francisco Museum of Modern Art, part of 'Inside Out: New Chinese Art,' San Francisco, CA, USA (solo)
  - Jack Tilton Gallery, New York, USA (solo)
- 1998
  - Gallery Q, Tokyo, Japan (solo)
  - "Chaos and Birth / Ma Liuming '98", Gallery Q, Tokyo, Japan
  - P.S.1 Contemporary Art Center, New York, USA
  - Inside Out: New Chinese Art, P.S.1 Contemporary Art Center, New York, USA
  - Video of performances, Autonomous Action, The large Glass. Auckland, New Zealand (group)
  - Tamavivant '98, Tama Art University, Tokyo, Japan (group)
  - "Fen-Ma Liuming Walks the Great Wall", performance, Beijing, China
- 1997
  - Photographs of Performances, Jack Tilton Gallery, New York, USA
  - Max Protetch Gallery, New York, USA
  - Fen-Ma Liuming at the Setagaya Art Museum (solo)
  - Setagaya Art Museum, Tokyo, Japan (solo)
  - Degenderism, Setagaya Art Museum, Tokyo, Japan (group)
  - Another Long March, Breda, Netherlands (group)
  - "Thirty-six Self Taken Photographs by Ma Liuming II", Performance at Setagaya Art Museum, Tokyo, Japan
  - "Photographs of Performances", Jack Tilton Gallery, New York, USA
- 1996
  - Ma Liuming, Chinese Contemporary Gallery, London, UK (solo)
  - "Fish Child", performance, Beijing, China
- 1995
  - "Fen-Ma Liuming and the Fish", Performance, Beijing, China (solo)
  - "Fen-Ma Liuming's lunch I & II", Performances, Beijing East Village, Beijing, China (solo)
  - To Raise an Anonymous Mountain by One Meter
- 1994
  - Fen-Ma Liuming's Lunch I, Beijing, China (solo)
- 1993
  - "Dialogue with Gilbert and George", performance, Beijing East Village, Beijing, China
  - "Ma Liuming I, Woman's face and Man's body", performance, Beijing East Village, Beijing, China
- 1992
  - Guangzhou Biennial, China (group)
