= Bill Majoros =

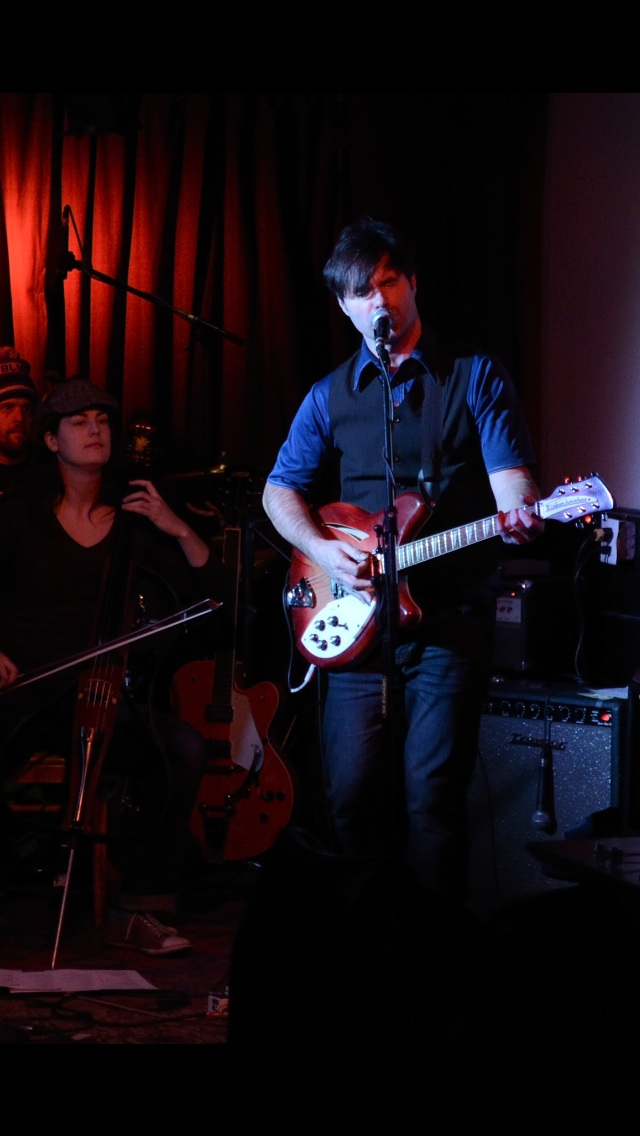

Background information
- Born: Hamilton, Ontario, Canada
- Genres: Psychedelic rock, indie rock, baroque pop
- Occupations: Singer, Songwriter, Producer
- Instruments: Guitar, drums, keyboards, bass
- Website: www.theforeignfilms.com

Bill Majoros is a Canadian musician, currently a songwriter, lead vocalist and multi-instrumentalist for the psychedelic pop act The Foreign Films.

Born in Hamilton, Ontario, Majoros has toured and recorded with many Canadian acts including The Nines, Flux A.D., Universal Honey, The Paper Airplane Company, Altogether Morris and The Cloudsmen.

From 1997 to 2004, he worked as main writer & guitarist in Flux A.D., winning a Hamilton Music Award in 2004 for "Best Alternative Album of the Year". Fellow members in Flux A.D. included Julie Fader, and Graham Walsh from Holy Fuck. Majoros's songs gained support from music luminaries Daniel Lanois, Robbie Robertson and Giles Martin. After Flux AD splintered into various projects Majoros began to release new music as The Foreign Films.

The Foreign Films' debut double length CD Distant Star was released in 2007. The 22 song LP was nominated for "Album of the Year" at the Hamilton Music Awards in 2007. He was also nominated as guitar player of the year.

The Foreign Films released a seven-song follow-up EP in November 2011. He has since released several follow-up singles, including "Glitter"/"Night Without the Day", "Sweet Sorrow"/"You Were My Summer Sun" and "Fall of the Summer Heart".

Again, under the name The Foreign Films, Bill Majoros recorded a 31-song, six-sided vinyl LP "The Record Collector", releasing one "side" at a time. The triple LP deluxe vinyl edition was released in 2018 to critical acclaim, topping many "best of the year lists".

"Epic" Jeff Elbel (Chicago-Sun Times and Illinois entertainer)

Guest musicians include Kori Pop Aaron Goldstein, City and Colour, Joel Stouffer, Dragonette and Rebecca Everette. In the same timeframe, he also collaborated with Steve Eggers, (The Nines). Four albums (Night Surfer and the Cassette Kids, Alejandro's Visions, Circles in the Snow and Colour Radio-American Transistor have emerged. They have received positive critical feedback from such legendary musicians as Andy Partridge (XTC), Michael Nesmith (Monkees) and Jason Falkner (Paul McCartney, Beck).

In 2017 and 2018 Bill Majoros was nominated for musician of the year for the Hamilton Ontario Arts Awards.

Majoros has toured with and played support shows for artists such as Alanis Morissette, The Tragically Hip, Echo and the Bunnymen, Jewel, Ron Sexsmith, 5440, Fountains of Wayne, Big Sugar, Blue Rodeo, Robyn Hitchcock, The Goo Goo Dolls and Pete Best etc.

As well as recording and playing live with The Foreign Films, Majoros produced Mary Avery's album The Fire and S.G Sinnicks. He also plays guitar with Rebecca Everette.

== Discography ==
=== Albums/EPs ===
The Foreign Films

- Distant Star (2007)
- The Foreign Films
- Fire from Spark EP(2010)
- The Record Collector (31 songs, triple vinyl LP and short story) (2018)
- Ocean Moon (New Songs and Hidden Gems) (2020)
- Starlight Serenade (2021)

The Nines

- Night Surfer and the Cassette kids (2015)
- Circles in the Snow EP (2016)
- Alehandro's Visions (2016)
- Colour Radio-American Transistor (2017)

=== Singles ===
- "Glitter/Night Without the Day"
- "Sweet Sorrow/You Were My Summer Sun"
- "Fall of the Summer Heart"
- Teardrop Town
- Epire of the Night
- Girl by the River
- Shadow in the Light
- Junior Astronomer's Club
- The Sun Will Shine Again
