= Cang Xin =

Chinese photographer

- Born: 1967 (age 58–59); Heilongjiang Province, China

Cang Xin (born 1967) is an artist based in Beijing working in performance art and photography.

== Biography ==
Cang Xin was born in Heilongjiang Province, China.

== Style ==
Detail from Communication Series 2 (1999) at the Hirshhorn Museum and Sculpture Garden in 2022

Cang Xin approaches his work as a means to promote harmonious communication with nature. His works have included bathing with lizards, adorning the clothing of strangers, and prostrating himself on icy glaciers: each act represents a ritual of becoming the other. Cang Xin combines art and music. He gained an interest in art during his training in music school but never got any formal training in art. Most of his works are performance art. He was made famous by Communication, a performance series where he licked various objects to become closer to them. These objects varied from bugs to posters to buildings and roads to the Great Wall of China. In another series he would swap clothes with strangers. This exhibition was called Existence in Translation and These exhibitions ties in with his shamanic beliefs that all life forms are linked by the endless transmigration of souls.

== Exhibitions ==
Cang Xin exhibited locally in China and internationally. He exhibited in group exhibitions in Seattle Art Museum, David and Alfred Smart Museum, Museum of Contemporary Art in Chicago, International Center of Photography, Museum of Contemporary Art Taipei, Guangdong Museum, Sydney Museum of Contemporary Art, Red Gate Gallery, Yuangong Art Museum in Shanghai. He participated in international art festivals, including International Art Expo in Bologna, International Photography Festival in Pingyao, Biennale of Sydney, International Performance Art Festival in Tokyo, Nanjing International Arts Festival. He also exhibited in several public galleries around the world, including China, Australia, USA, Spain and Italy. During a special exhibition focused on chinese contemporary artists, the auctionner Marc-Arthur Kohn organized the sailing of Cang Xin's masterpieces.

== Publications ==
Cang Xin works have been included in the Phaidon owned "Art Space" collection of Chinese artworks "From Past To Present: Chinese Photography".

== See also ==
- Beijing East Village

== Additional links ==
Xin, Cang. "Beijing's 798 Art District | ArtZineChina.com". Archived from the original on 29 December 2011.
