= Zhang Huan =

Chinese visual artist (born 1965)

- Born: Dong Ming; 1965 (age 60–61); Anyang, Henan Province, China
- Education: Henan University, Kaifeng (BA, 1988); China Central Academy of Fine Arts, Beijing (MA, 1993)
- Known for: Sculpture, photography, performance art
- Movement: Contemporary art
- Children: 1

Zhang Huan (Chinese: 張洹; born 1965) is a Chinese artist based in Shanghai and New York City. He began his career as a painter and then transitioned to performance art before making a comeback to painting. He is primarily known for his performance work, but also makes photographs and sculptures.

== Early life and education ==
Zhang was born in Anyang, Henan Province and named Dong Ming (Chinese: 東明; pinyin: Dōng Míng) as a tribute to Chairman Mao. At the age of one, he was sent to live in rural Tangyin County for eight years with his grandmother.

He received his B.A. from Henan University in Kaifeng (1988) and his M.A. from the China Central Academy of Fine Arts in Beijing (1993); he changed his name to Zhang Huan in the 1990s when he started his studies at the Central Academy.

== Career ==
=== Performance art ===
Zhang Huan helped to establish a small artistic community known as the Beijing East Village, located on the margins of the city. The group of friends from art school pioneered this particular brand of performance in China and Zhang was often reprimanded by officials for the perceived inappropriateness of his actions.

Zhang's performance art always involves his body in one way or another, usually naked, occasionally involving masochistic actions. For example, for 12 Square Meters (1994), the accompanying photography exhibit showed him as "a naked man, his head half-shaved, sitting in a prison-like space. His skin was wet and covered with flies, having been smeared with honey and fishy liquid. His face looked blank but tough, as if he were trying to meditate his way through pain."

In a piece titled To Add One Meter to an Anonymous Mountain (1995), he and nine other artists climbed a mountain near Beijing, stripped and lay down on top of one another to create a second, mini-peak. In another group performance called To Raise the Water Level in a Fishpond (1997), he asked 40 migrant laborers to stand in a pond so that their physical presence would raise the water level.

He moved to New York City in 1998. Zhang continued his naked performance art in the United States with Pilgrimage — Wind and Water in New York (1998) and My America (Hard to Acclimatize) (1999).

=== Sculpture ===
Zhang returned to China in 2006 and took up sculpture after converting to Buddhism. He also involves the body in his sculptures; his earliest sculptures were giant copper hands and feet, magnified versions of fragments of broken Buddhist figures that he found in Tibet.

By using quasi-religious ritual, he seeks to discover the point at which the spiritual can manifest via the corporeal. He uses simple repetitive gestures, usually regarded as meaningless work-for-work's-sake chores. Buddhism, with its temple music, sculptures and philosophy is a prevalent theme in Zhang Huan's work.

His sculpture Long Ear Ash Head (2007), for example, consists of a massive head made of incense ash and steel. It fuses the artist's image with the lengthened earlobes representing happiness and good fortune in the Buddhist religion.

He continued to explore Buddhism with the sculpture Sydney Buddha (2015), an exhibition in which two Buddha sculptures were positioned facing each other: "One, a headless metal statue. The other, a crumbling sculpture made from over 20 tonnes of incense ash, which was collected from Buddhist temples in Shanghai and across China's Jiangsu and Zhejiang provinces."

Of Sydney Buddha, the artist said: "The piece conveys the collective memory, soul, thoughts and prayers, and collapse of mankind. It implies a collective ineffectiveness, arising from taking action when none should be taken, upsetting the natural order of things."

He has exhibited at shows including the 2002 Whitney Biennial and Rituals at the Akademie der Künste in Berlin.

== Zhang Huan’s Performance Art ==
Among the topics [Zhang] has addressed, in some 40 performances, are the power of unified action to challenge oppressive political regimes; the status and plight of the expatriate in the new global culture; the persistence of structures of faith in communities undermined by violent conflict; and the place of censorship in contemporary democracy.

— Thom Collins, Witness (Museum of Contemporary Art, Sydney)

=== Angel (1993) ===
Angel, one of Zhang Huan's first performance art pieces, dates back to 1993 at the National Art Gallery located in Beijing, China. Zhang placed a giant white canvas on the floor of the exhibition space, then stepped out of the exhibition area and had a jar of red liquid (supposed to represent blood) and mangled doll parts poured over him. Afterwards, Zhang picked up the doll pieces and walked back to the exhibition space and onto the canvas, where he then tried to reassemble the doll back together on the canvas.

Thom Collins described the piece in a biographical writeup for the 2004 group exhibition Witness at the Museum of Contemporary Art, Sydney: "This work, a startling and visceral commentary on the Chinese government mandate of abortions for women conceiving more than the legal limit of one child, led to a quick closure of the exhibition and serious censure of the artist."

=== 12 Square Meters (1994) ===
Zhang Huan grew up with the experience of living in a crowded village area. He did not have much space for himself, which impressed the idea of China's overpopulation on him at young age. In 1994, Zhang Huan was in a small village in China and needed to use a restroom after lunch. He found a public restroom just off the street and went on in. Because of a lot of rain the village had been receiving, the restroom wasn't cleaned recently due to "weather precautions". As Zhang entered the restroom he found that it reeked with awful smells and flies were everywhere in the room. This experience reminded him of his childhood and the small crowded, unclean restrooms he used when he was growing up. "Once I stepped in, I found myself surrounded by thousands of flies that seemed to have been disturbed by my appearance. I felt as if my body was being devoured by the flies." This experience served as inspiration for the piece 12 Square Meters.

"Zhang Huan spread on his body a visceral liquid of fish and honey to attract the flies in the public restroom in the village. He sat on the toilet, almost immobile for an hour." In a matter of minutes, flies covered his body seeking the treat he slathered on himself.

=== Foam (1998) ===
Foam 6 (1998) at the Hirshhorn Museum and Sculpture Garden in 2022

Foam is one of Zhang Huan's non-performance pieces, of which he has not done many. The piece consists of 15 photographs of his face where he is covered in what appears to be sea foam. In his mouth is his wife's family.

=== Family Tree (2000) ===
Family Tree consists of nine sequential images of Zhang Huan's face. The photographs are taken in a chronological order, from dusk to dawn. This performance piece is supposed to be a representation of Zhang's lineage. During the work, Zhang would have three calligraphers write a combination of names known to him, personal stories, learned tales and random thoughts. The calligraphers worked on his face, adding more and more during the chronological period. Eventually, his face was covered by so much calligraphy, it was hard to make out what was actually written.

=== Peace (2003) ===
Peace is another non-performance art work that Zhang Huan did in order to create a symbolic self-portrait of himself. Again, in order to pay respect to his ancestors, Huan had the bell inscribed with names from eight generations of his ancestors. The bell itself is Tibetan inspired by small bells used in ritual practices. In order to ring the bell, Zhang had a real-life cast made of himself, and hung just a few feet from the bell. The cast version of himself is supposed to represent the compassion that is the necessary counterpart for wisdom. The actual act of ringing the bell is supposed to represent the "artistic struggle with the circumstances of and inheritance from family is both necessarily violent and richly generative."

== Selected solo exhibitions ==
- 1988 Henan University, Kaifeng
- 1999 Max Protetch Gallery, New York
- 2000 Cotthem Gallery, Barcelona
- 2001 Galerie Albert Benamou, Paris
- 2002 Kunstverein in Hamburg
- 2003 Bochum Museum, Bochum
- 2004 Norton Museum of Art, Florida
- 2005 Museum of Fine Arts, Boston
- 2006 Sherman Galleries, Sydney
- 2007 Haunch of Venison, London
- 2008 Shanghai Art Museum, Shanghai
- 2009 Haunch of Venison, Zürich
- 2011 Blum & Poe, Los Angeles
- 2012 Art Gallery of Ontario, Toronto
- 2013 Palazzo Vecchio, Forte di Belvedere, Firenze
- 2014 Pace London, Spring Poppy Fields
