= Joana Serrat =

Spanish singer

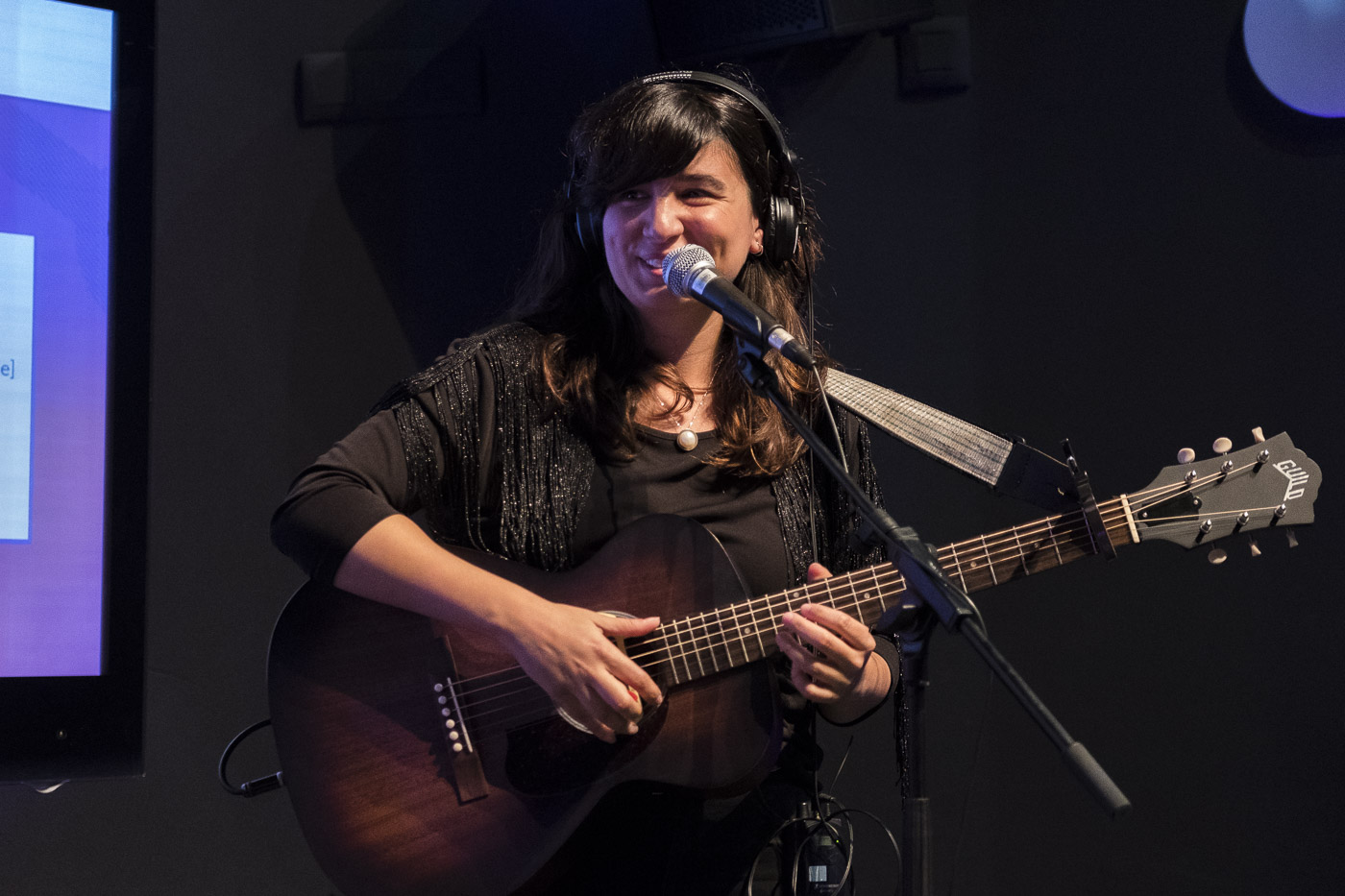

Joana Serrat i Tarré (born 1983 in Vic) is a Catalan folk and americana singer, best known for her albums The Relief Sessions (2012), Dear Great Canyon (2014), Cross The Verge (2016), Dripping Springs (2017), and Hardcore from the Heart (2021), released in English and Catalan.
