= Beijing East Village =

Artistic community in Beijing, China

The Beijing East Village (Chinese: 北京东村; pinyin: Běijīng Dōng Cūn) was an avant-garde artistic community of the early 1990s located in the eastern part of Beijing, just past the Third Ring Road on what was then the city's margins. It was formed in 1993 when a group of like-minded artists took up residence together in a "village" of low-quality migrant worker housing, fixing at the entrance a handwritten sign. Their community's name was inspired by the East Village of Manhattan, with which they felt an affinity in their experimental aesthetics. Only the year after its founding, following the arrest of Ma Liuming for cooking naked in a courtyard, the community was closed by the police, though former residents continued to collaborate.

== Residents ==
The residents of the Beijing East Village comprised, most significantly, the first generation of Chinese performance artists, as well as the photographers who would document their works. They had come to Beijing from different provinces: Ma Liuming, for example, was from Huangshi (Hubei), Zhang Huan from Anyang (Henan), Cang Xin from Baotou (Inner Mongolia), Duan Yingmei from Daqing (Heilongjiang). Their aesthetic was decidedly avant-garde; they ignored the goings-on in the then-influential Yuanmingyuan artistic community across the city, rather choosing to cultivate a distance from their peers. They frequently collaborated on performances, which the photographers among them documented. Manuela Lietti points out that this sort of community collaboration, though less frequent in the West, has not been uncommon in China:

In many places in the world, particularly the 'West', artistic practice has frequently been carried out on an individual basis. In China, however, artistic practice has often been undertaken within the realm of a community of individuals bound by a precise common trait, be it of a political, social or creative nature. In a country whose history and cultural agenda have often been characterized by collective movements, the bond between individual expression and communal practice has always been tight and at certain moments even obliterated the individual's voice.

=== Partial list of residents ===
- Cang Xin
- Duan Yingmei
- Gao Yang
- Kong Bu
- Li Guomin
- Ma Liuming
- Ma Zongyin
- Rong Rong
- Tan Yeguang
- Wang Shihua
- Xing Danwen
- Xu Shan
- Zhang Binbin
- Zhang Huan
- Zhu Ming
- Zuoxiao Zuzhou

Sources for list:

== Performances ==
Two of Zhang Huan's most famous performances, 65 Kilograms and 12 Square Meters, were staged in the Beijing East Village, 65 Kilograms in his own combination living space and studio, 12 Square Meters in a public toilet not far from there.

In 1995, after the community had been disbanded, many of the Beijing East Village artists collaborated on the performance To Add One Meter to an Anonymous Mountain in Mentougou District, including Wang Shihua, Cang Xin, Gao Yang, Zuoxiao Zuzhou, Ma Zongyin, Zhang Huan, Ma Liuming, Zhang Binbin and Zhu Ming.

== Photography vs. performance art ==
As Gaby Wood writes, the Beijing East Village photographers' practice of documenting the performance artists resulted in "a curious aesthetic difficulty":

When the photographers documented the performers, whose work was it? As recently as 1998, the New York exhibition of contemporary Chinese art, Inside Out, credited the photographic records of performance works by Ma Liuming and Zhang Huan to the performer, not the photographer. In Between Past and Future, the new show of Chinese photography and video at the V&A, some of the same images are listed as artworks by the photographer. 'I got very confused,' Xing Danwen says of this tussle. 'I had to go to an expensive copyright lawyer in New York. She said: "These are your photographs, they are your copyright." I still wondered if they were my own artwork - in a way it's not, but they are my photographs.' She resolved the issue by publishing a book entitled A Personal Diary of Chinese Avant-Garde Art in the 1990s. In a similar vein, Rong Rong's limited-edition hardback is called Rong Rong's East Village.
