= Trinity Revisited =

Studio album by Cowboy Junkies
- Released: October 8, 2007
- Recorded: November 4, 2006
- Genre: Alternative country, country blues
- Length: 59:14
- Label: Cooking Vinyl, Strobosonic (Canada)
- Producer: François Lamoureux

Cowboy Junkies chronology
At the End of Paths Taken (2007)	Trinity Revisited (2007)	Renmin Park (2010)

Professional ratings
Review scores
Source	Rating
AllMusic	3.5/5 stars
Pitchfork	3.8 of 10

Trinity Revisited is an album and a film by the Cowboy Junkies, released on October 8, 2007. It is a remake of the Junkies' most famous album, The Trinity Session. The new album was recorded in the fall of 2006 at Toronto's Church of the Holy Trinity, the same venue where the original album was recorded.

== Album production ==
In order to celebrate the twentieth anniversary of the Junkies defining album, The Trinity Session, the band decided to revisit and reinterpret the album, seeing what twenty years of performing experience would bring to the songs. In order to expand upon the goal of reinterpreting, the Cowboy Junkies invited three guest musicians whose work and lives were affected by the Trinity Session, and whose work has affected the Cowboy Junkies. Guest musicians on the 2007 album include Natalie Merchant, Ryan Adams and Vic Chesnutt. Each takes the lead vocal on one of the album's songs (Adams on "200 More Miles", Merchant on "To Love Is to Bury" and Chesnutt on "Postcard Blues"), and shares vocal and musical duties on other tracks. Jeff Bird, a session musician who has appeared on virtually every Cowboy Junkies album but has never been credited as an official band member, also appears. In order to create the same atmosphere, they kept rehearsal to a minimum, getting together for a few hours a day before the recording. The guest musicians worked with the band to re-imagine the songs, making suggestions, trying out fresh nuances.

The album was also packaged with a performance film, Trinity Revisited, and a documentary film, Trinity Session Revisited, both by directors Pierre and François Lamoureux of FogoLabs, who produced and recorded the album and the films. Although the album was not recorded with a single microphone like the original album, François Lamoureux aimed to be faithful to the idea, so he got a Holophone H2-Pro surround microphone and put the musicians in a circle, and augmented the recording with close-miking using ten Shure KSM141 mics. The Holophone surround mic picked up too much ambient sound from the church, and after mixing, only about 10 to 15 percent of the sound came from the surround mic.

In 2008, Trinity Revisited was nominated for 5 Gemini Awards and won 2: Best Sound in a Comedy, Variety or Performing Arts Program or Series and Best Performance in a Performing Arts Program or Series. The same year, it was nominated for Music DVD of the Year at the Juno Awards.

In Canada, the album and DVD were released on Strobosonic.

In concerts to support the album, singer Thea Gilmore substituted for Merchant in some shows.

== Track listing ==
CD
No.	Title	Writer(s)	Length
1.	"Mining for Gold"	Traditional, arranged by James Gordon	1:36
2.	"Misguided Angel" (Duet with Natalie Merchant, featuring Ryan Adams)	Margo Timmins, Michael Timmins	4:49
3.	"Blue Moon Revisited (Song for Elvis)" (Duet with Vic Chesnutt)	Margo Timmins, Michael Timmins, Richard Rodgers, Lorenz Hart	5:38
4.	"I Don't Get It" (Featuring Ryan Adams)	Margo Timmins, Michael Timmins	3:54
5.	"I'm So Lonesome I Could Cry" (Featuring Vic Chesnutt, Ryan Adams)	Hank Williams	6:16
6.	"To Love Is to Bury" (Lead vocals by Natalie Merchant)	Margo Timmins, Michael Timmins	3:32
7.	"200 More Miles" (Lead vocals by Ryan Adams)	Michael Timmins	5:18
8.	"Dreaming My Dreams with You" (Featuring Vic Chesnutt)	Allen Reynolds	3:52
9.	"Working on a Building"	Traditional	6:38
10.	"Sweet Jane" (Featuring Ryan Adams)	Lou Reed	8:45
11.	"Postcard Blues" (Lead vocals by Vic Chesnutt)	Michael Timmins	3:36
12.	"Walkin' After Midnight"	Don Hecht, Alan Block	5:20
Total length:			59:14

DVD
No.	Title	Length
1.	"Trinity Revisited"	1:02:31
2.	"The Trinity Session Revisited – A Documentary"	48:02
Total length:		1:50:33

== Personnel ==
Cowboy Junkies

- Margo Timmins – vocals
- Michael Timmins – guitar
- Alan Anton – bass
- Peter Timmins – drums

Additional Musicians

- Jeff Bird – mandolin, harmonica, violin, fiddle
- Ryan Adams – lead vocals (tracks 7 & 10), backing vocals (track 2), guitar, drums
- Natalie Merchant – lead vocals (tracks 2 & 6), backing vocals, piano
- Vic Chesnutt – lead vocals (tracks 3 & 11)

Production

- Francois Lamoureux – producer, director, mixing, DVD mastering at FogoLabs
- Pierre Lamoureux – producer, director
- Peter J. Moore – audio mastering at the E Room
- Denis Normandeau – mixing
- Eugene O'Connor – director of photography, lighting
- Johnny McCullagh – lighting
- Yves Dion – editing
