= Zachary Lucky =

- Born: January 4, 1989 (age 37); Saskatoon, Saskatchewan, Canada
- Genres: Folk, country, Americana
- Instrument: Acoustic guitar
- Years active: 2008–present
- Labels: Missed Connection Records, Nordvis Records, Wroxton Recordings
- Website: www.zacharylucky.com

Zachary Lucky (born January 4, 1989) is a Canadian songwriter, folk and Country artist based in Saskatoon, Saskatchewan. He is the grandson of Canadian country music artist John "Smilin Johnnie" Lucky.

== Career ==
To date Lucky has nine releases: three EPs and six full-length albums Come and Gone, Saskatchewan, The Ballad of Losing You,Everywhere a Man Can Be, "Midwestern", "Songs for hard times", and "The Wind".

== Discography ==
=== Albums ===
- Come and Gone (August 5, 2010)
- Saskatchewan (March 6, 2012)
- The Ballad of Losing You (September 17, 2013)
- Everywhere a Man Can Be (October 7, 2016)
- Midwestern (October 18, 2019)
- Songs for Hard Times (November 5, 2021)
- The Wind (November 1, 2024)

=== EPs ===
- Common Dialogue (March 2, 2008)
- Maps and Towns (April 14, 2009)
- In the Fields, in the Hills (October 2, 2009)
