= Mount Miaofeng =

Mountain in Beijing, China

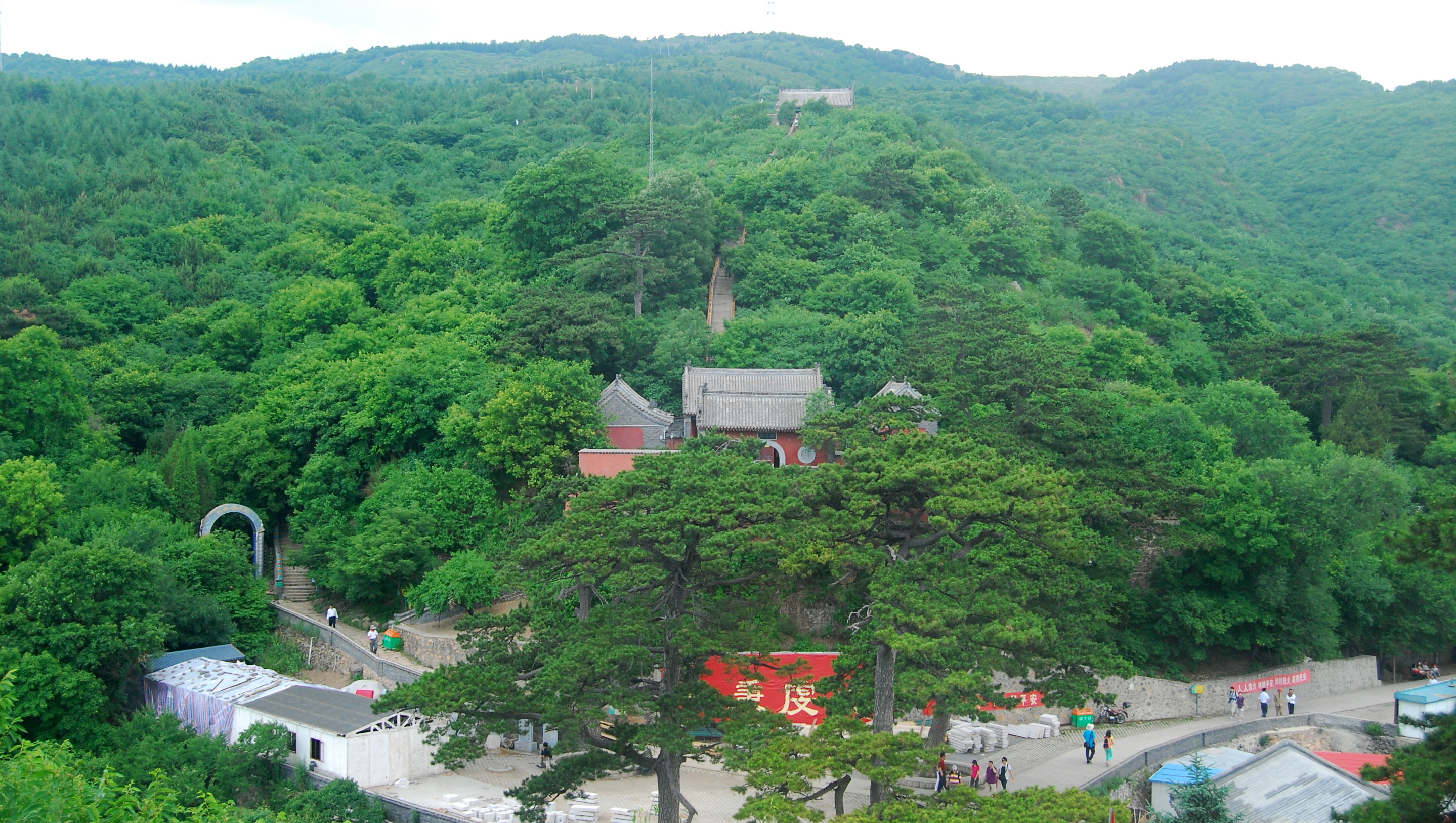
- View of the Mount Miaofeng

Highest point
- Elevation: 1,330 m (4,360 ft)
- Coordinates: 40°4′5.59″N 116°1′31.48″E

Geography
- Location within China
- Location: Mentougou District, Beijing, China
- Parent range: Western Hills

Mount Miaofeng (Chinese: 妙峰山; pinyin: Miàofēng Shān; lit. 'Marvelous Peak Mountain') is a mountain in the northwestern Beijing, an extension of the Taihang Mountains. It is located in the Mentougou District of Beijing about 70 kilometers to the northwest of downtown Beijing.

Mount Miaofeng is culturally significant as a site of worship for the Taoist goddess Bixia Yuanjun (Chinese: 碧霞元君; pinyin: Bìxiá Yuánjūn) also known as the "Heavenly Jade Maiden" (Chinese: 天仙玉女; pinyin: Tiānxian Yùnǚ) who is associated with Mount Tai ("Empress of Mount Tai", Chinese: 泰山娘娘; pinyin: Tàishān Niangniang). Mount Miaofeng is the western terminus of a pilgrimage route from Beijing. The pilgrimage and the temple fair were held during the fourth month of the Chinese lunar calendar.
