= Zuoxiao Zuzhou =

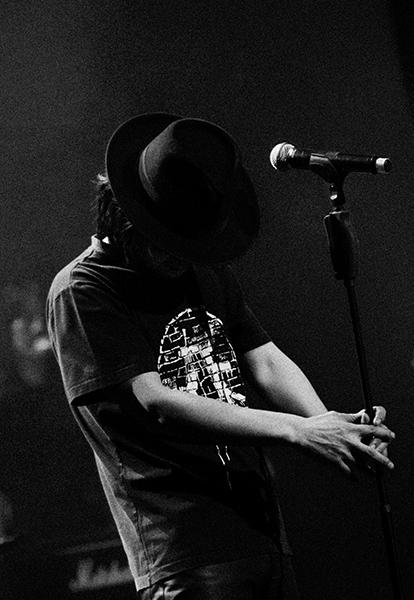
- Zuoxiao Zuzhou performing at Beijing in March 2010

Background information
- Born: Wu Hongjin; March 4, 1970 (age 55); Jianhu, Jiangsu, China
- Genres: Folk, Rock, country, experimental, blues, Folk rock
- Occupations: Musician, Artist
- Instruments: Vocals, Guitar, Violin
- Years active: 1993–present
- Website: Zuoxiao Zuzhou Official Website

Zuoxiao Zuzhou (Chinese: 左小祖咒; born 4 March 1970), is a Chinese musician and artist.

He produced and arranged famous Chinese artist Ai Weiwei's first rock album, The Divine Comedy. The soundtracks from the album are featured prominently in Ai Weiwei's documentary films.

Growing up, he founded the rock band No and was a member of the Beijing East Village art collective. He has also contributed to the Huayi Chinese Festival of Arts at the Esplanade, Singapore, and provided vocals for the song "A Walk in the Park" on Cowboy Junkies 2010 album Renmin Park. In 2008, he released the two-disc You Know Where the East Is.

The meaning of Zuoxiao (左 "left", 小 "little") Zuzhou (祖 "ancestor", 咒 "curse") reflects that everyone called him "unclear" or "unreliable" (没谱, méipǔ). or, that it is just for sound and has no meaning.

== Early life and career ==
=== Early life ===
He was born on March 4, 1970 in Jianhu County, originally named Wu Hongjin. He grew up in a waterman family. He experienced usual life on the street when he was young. In 1993, he came to Beijing after living in Shanghai. He later established “Beijing East Village” along with some other artists in Eastern suburbs which had a far-reaching impact on Chinese contemporary art. During this time, he founded the band NO with Ye Qian, and later changed his name to Zuoxiao Zuzhou as the vocal, guitarist, violinist and composer for the group.

=== Early albums ===
His first album, The Missing Master was distributed in 1998. The second album Trip To The Temple Fair was distributed 2 years later. These two albums obtained the top album in the Rock magazine at that time. The third album, Zuoxiaozuzhou At Di'anmen won the Chinese music market, making him a very popular artist. In 1999, his work Increased To Famous Mountains One Meter was presented in the 48th Venice International Biennale which was collectively created by Zuoxiao Zuzhou and several other artists from Beijing East. After releasing The Missing Master and The Trip to Temple Fair he signed a contract with Modern Sky Music Company in 2004.

In 2005, he self-published the album I can not sit sadly by your side. In 2007, The U.S.A, a film soundtrack album was released, sold for $25 each, which set a new record in Chinese music album. In 2009, the double disc You Know Where The East Side Is was published, selling for $85 each, which makes it the most expensive album record.

On March 19, 2010, Zuoxiao Zuzhou held his first solo concert "All The Best" in Beijing Century Theatre. His entire lineup included bandmates Ai Weiwei, Ning Hao, Meng Jinghui, Jia Zhangke, Zhu Wen, Li Yanliang, and Fang Wuxing. The concert DVD version was released in March 2012.

You Know Where The East Is was awarded Southern Weekly annual culture original music in 2009. Big Deal has awarded nine nominations of Chinese Music Media Award in 2010, he obtained The Best Mandarin Male Singer, and Best Composer Award.

=== Controversy ===
On August 12, 2009, Ai Weiwei was invited by the lawyer of Tan Zuoren up to the court in Chengdu, and Zuoxiao Zuzhou and others went to Sichuan together. In the early morning, Chengdu Police broke into door and hit Ai Weiwei on the head. Then, Ai was illegally detained till the end of the case to trial. The story was made into a documentary "Lao Ma Ti Hua", whom Zuoxiao Zuzhou was the main soundtrack producer. On June 6, 2011, after Ai was released by the authorities after illegal detention for 81 days, Zuoxiao Zuzhou begin to produce Ai’s rock album The Divine Comedy. The album was finished in 2013, and was published in the United States.

On April 24, 2011, when Zuoxiao Zuzhou as the grand finale artists who performed in ZhouZhuang folk poetry festival, some audience members screamed the name of Ai Weiwei and on the background Weibo screen screened content related to Ai Weiwei. Thus, he has prohibited to participate in any commercial performance in China, including KAMA LOVE music festival in June.

On Sep 23, 2014, album We Need A Troublemaker was published. The same year, he participated in music festivals in Wuhan, Beijing, Shanghai, Shenzhen, Chengdu, Kunming, Changsha, Xiamen, Dali and Son on include Strawberry, Lebao music festival in succession which means his ban has been removed.

During Double Nine Festival 2012, The house of Zouzhou’s father-in-law was located in Qianjiatang, Wunjin District, Hangzhou had a forced demolition. The news triggered great attention in society; many celebrities posted Weibo message to support including Li Chengpeng, Yao Chen, Li Kaifu, Han han, Hong Huang, Murong Xuecun, Han Zhiguo, Yu Jianrong, and Luo Yonghao. Zuoxiao Zuzhou went back home immediately to stop the demolition. Afterwards, Ling Guangyao, the secretary of Changzhou Wujin Hi-Tech Development District stated that before any negotiation with his family, the house will not be demolished. Moreover, the neighboring house also will not be demolished in order to avoid trouble. However, rumors on the internet about the famous nail household has never stopped.

=== Popularity growth ===
In 2010, Zuzhou contributed music, lyrics and vocal in Cowboy Junkies’ song, "A Walk in The Park" in their album Renmin Park. In the same album, Cowboy Junkies covered Zuzhou’s song, "I Cannot Sit Sadly By Your Side". The band member Michael Timmins called Zuoxiao Zuzhou “China’s Leonard Cohen” in an interview with the National Public Radio.

In 2013, Zuzhou was invited to deliver a speech at the University of California, Berkeley, titled “China” in Zuoxiao Zuzhou’s Music and Art. Cowboy Junkies’ member Michael Timmins joined the event as the discussant.

In February 2014, German newspaper Süddeutsche Zeitung and Swiss newspaper Tages-Anzeiger carried a cover story about Zuoxiao Zuzhou. His photos was chosen by several famous magazine in China as their cover photos including GQ, ELLE MAN, Esquire, City Magazine and FHM magazine.

On February 28, 2015, Zuzhou performed PM2.5 in the animated session PM2.5’s Confession of Chai JIng’s documentary film Under the Dome. Hitting over 10 million views 24 hours after its release, the film successfully called for public attention to the air pollution in China before the National People’s Congress and the Chinese People’s Political Consultative Conference.

== Discography ==
- The lost master 《走失的主人》1998
- Trip to temple fair 《庙会之旅》1999
- Zuoxiao Zuzhou at Di'anmen 《左小祖咒在地安门》 2001
- I cannot Sit Sadly by Your Side 《我不能悲伤地坐在你身旁》2005
- The USA《美国》2006
- You Know Where the East Is 《你知道东方在哪一边》2008
- Big deal 《大事》2009
- Zuoxiao Zuzhou OST For Ai Weiwei Works No.1 《左小祖咒原声配乐No.1》 2010
- Trip to temple fair II《庙会之旅II》2011
- You Know The Enemy Is Over There《你知道对方在那一边》2011
- Zuoxiao Zuzhou Head to Naizifang《左小祖咒去奶子房》2012
- Love for Life《最爱》2012
- I Never Tasted This Kind of Little Grape 《这小小的葡萄我从来没吃过》2013
- The Ideal City 《一座城池》2013
- We Need A Troubadour 《我们需要个歌手》2014
- 2010-2013 Beijing Live 《2010-2013北京现场》2015
- I Have Never Eaten These Tiny Grapes Live 《这小小的葡萄我从来没吃过发布Live》2015
- Flore 《花神》 2016
- The Shanghai Days《上海岁月》2016
- Farewell Kanas《再见喀纳斯》2017
- Zuoxiao Zuzhou 2016 Xi'an Unplugged Live《左小祖咒2016西安不插电Live》2017
- The Soul and Flesh in Taipei《风月情色在台北》2017
- Never Sorry 《非常抱歉》2018
- Grapes Ripe 《葡萄熟了》2018
- The Artist In Artists 《艺术家中的艺术家》2018
- The lost master 20 anniversary 《走失的主人20周年》2018
- The Power of Belief is Endless 《相信的力量是无穷的》2018
- Chongqing Woman 《重庆女人》2018
- The Live of Three Nights in Ulanbator 《乌兰巴托的三个夜晚实况》2019

== Art events and exhibitions ==
2017

- Contemporary Chinese Works on Paper, Ipswich Art Gallery
- Crystal - The Momentum of Contemporary Art, Museum Of Art Without Boundaries

2016

- ‘Art Farmer’ Personal painting Exhibition by Zuoxiao Zuzhou, One S, Shenzhen
- Murakami Takashi & Zuoxiao Zuzhou ‘I Can't Look at Your Gigglish Face When I Sad’, D.House Life Hall, Xiamen
- ‘Wrong Version’ Personal painting Exhibition by Zuoxiao Zuzhou, Vision Hill Arts Center, Tianjin

2015

- ‘Their Nursery Rhyme’ Personal painting Exhibition by Zuoxiao Zuzhou, Ai Yike Art Gallery, Changsha
- ‘Tell Me That Story Again’ Personal painting Exhibition by Zuoxiao Zuzhou, Pipal Gallery, Guangzhou
- ‘Life Experience of Aesthetic’ The Momentum of Contemporary Art, Sichuan University of Culture and Arts
- ‘Cube Of Intuition’ Personal painting Exhibition by Zuoxiao Zuzhou, Cao Chang Di, Beijing, ARTASTE
- ‘A Beautiful New World’ International Contemporary Art Exhibition - The 2nd Nanjing International Art Festival, Nanjing International Exhibition Centre
- Mortal Beings&Little Things - Zuoxiao Zuzhou's Small Paintings, No.55 Art Space, Beijing
- Not On Site: Absolute Threshold and a Type of Site-Specific Drift, AMNUA, Nanjing

2014

- ‘Switch’, First Contemporary Art Exhibition of Xi'an, Xi'an Museum of Contemporary Art
- ‘Integration’, T-Museum Opening Exhibition, Hangzhou T-Museum, Zhejiang

2013

- Spectacle Reconstruction –Chinese Contemporary Art, MODEM Centre for Modern and Contemporary Arts, Hungary
- Voice of the Unseen, Collateral event of the 55th International Art Exhibition - La Biennale Di Venezia
- Walking with Pigs, Arthur M. Sackler Museum of Art and Archeology at Peking University
- Individual Growth—the Momentum of Contemporary Art, Tianjin Art Museum, Shijiazhuang Art Museum
- Fuck off 2, The Groninger Museum, the Netherlands

2012

- ‘Baptized - Art Under the Disaster’, CCD300 Contemporary Art and Design Center
- ‘Down to earth’, Contemporary Art Collection Exhibition in Guangxi, You Ming Tang Art Center of MIXC, Nanning

2011

- ‘Slap’, Invitation Exhibition of Young Artists, Beijing Sanlitun four five Art Center, China
- ‘Red Prescription’, Huangjueping Independent Image Art Space, Chongqing
- ‘Elite Exhibition of Contemporary Art’, Dalian Zhongshan Museum of Art

2010

- ‘Interconnected’, Three Shadows Art Documentary, Beijing Three Shadows Photography Art Centre, China
- ‘San Sheng Wan Wu’, Comprehensive Art Exhibition, Shanghai Zhengda Contemporary Art Exhibition Hall, China
- ‘Museum on Paper’, Art & Investment Magazine, Beijing, China
- ‘Get It Louder-Sharism’, Beijing Sanlitun Soho, Shanghai 800Show Creative Park, China
- ‘Transition’, Contemporary Art Exhibition, Wenzhou Seventh Art Center, China
- ‘Nature of China’, Contemporary Art Documentary, Suzhou True Color Museum, China
- ‘Arles in Beijing’, The First Annual Caochangdi PhotoSpring, China
- ‘The 4th China Independent Film Festival’, Institute of Drama and Film Studies, Nanjing University, China
- ‘Passing China’, Contemporary Chinese Photography, Gallery Sanstorium, Istanbul, Turkey.
- ‘3+X People And Things Around’, Contemporary Art Exhibition, China Art Archives and Warehouse, Beijing, China
- ‘3+X/B Asks B Answers’, H.J.Y Contemporary Art Center, Beijing, China
- ‘3+X Can Be More Poetic’, Contemporary Art Exhibition, Nanjing Shangdong Contemporary Art, China
- ‘3+X’, Contemporary Art Exhibition, Arthur M. Sackler Museum of Art and Archeology at Peking University, China
- ‘Contemporary Artist Photo Exhibition’, Today Art Gallery, Beijing, China
- ‘You West, Me East’, Chinese Contemporary Art Exhibition, Chengdu K Gallery, China
- ‘You West, Me East’, Chinese Contemporary Art Exhibition, Shenzhen Art Museum, China
- ‘You West, Me East’, Chinese Contemporary Art Exhibition, Wuhan Art Museum, China
- ‘You West, Me East’, Chinese Contemporary Art Exhibition, Xi’an Art Museum, China
- ‘Dong Gallery New Art Show’, Dong Gallery, 798 Art District, Beijing, China

2009

- ‘New Art Revolution-Chinese Contemporary Art in Cuba’, National Museum of Fine Art, Havana, Cuba
- ‘Yan Gerber International Arts Festival(1st)’, Yan Gerber Museum of Modern Art, Weichang County, Hebei Province, China
- ‘Passing By China’, Contemporary Chinese Photography, Eli Klein Fine Art Gallery, New York, U.S
- ‘So Sorry’, Ai Weiwei, Haus der Kunst, Munich, Germany
- ‘Polar Region Tension’, Exhibition of Artists from Beijing, Shanghai and Chengdu, Qisheng Gallery, Luodai Town, China
- ‘China Imagery, City Flag’, Xi'an Qujiang International Contemporary Art Season, China
- ‘Zhi Dong Da Xi’, Yuangong＆Zuoxiao Zuzhou Exhibition, Shanghu Gallery, China
- ‘Fluid Community’, Constellations, The First Beijing 798 Biennale, China
- ‘Crap’, Chengdu Contemporary Art Exhibition, China
- ‘2nd Mary Inn Media Clippings, Art Meets Rock’ n Roll’, Yugong Yishan Club, Beijing, China
- ‘19 Games’, Chinese Contemporary Art Exhibition, T. Art Center, Beijing, China
- ‘13 No Kaos’, Duffy Cigar Art Gallery, Kunming, Yunnan, China
- ‘Reflection’-2009 New Art World Invitation Exhibition, Wall Art Museum, The Central Academy of Arts & Design, Beijing, China
- ‘Reflection’-2009 New Art World Invitation Exhibition, West Lake Gallery, Zhejiang, China

2008

- ‘Chinese Complex’, Contemporary Art Exhibition, Huamao Center, Beijing, China
- Hypallage, the Post-Modern Mode Of Chinese Contemporary Art, The OCT Art & Design Gallery, Shenzhen, China
- ‘Maze II’, Asian Contemporary Art Center, Beijing, China
- Palm Beach 3 Art Fair, Florida, U.S.
- Art Basel Miami-China Art in the Beach, Florida, U.S.
- ‘You Know Where the East is’, Imperial City Art Museum, Beijing, China
- ‘Sky’ Famed Artists Gallery Show, Red Space Gallery, 798 Art District, Beijing, China
- ‘Academy and Non-Academy’ Gallery Show, Yibo Gallery, Shanghai, China
- Art Exhibition, Chongqing Art Festival
- Sculpture Show, Loft, 798 Art District, Beijing China,
- International Contemporary Art Exhibition, Shanghai Expo
- Contemporary Art Exhibition, Beijing Expo, China
- Art Exhibition, Yuangong Modern Art Gallery, Shanghai, China

2007

- ‘A Retrospective of Unnamed Art Group’, Shanghai Zendai Museum of Modern Art, China
- Pingyao International Photography Festival, Shanxi, China
- ‘Convection’ Retrospective of Collections at Three Shadows Contemporary Photography Center, Beijing, China
- ‘I Love Contemporary Art Also’, Miao Feng Mountain, Beijing, China

2006

- ‘Seven’ Contemporary Art Exhibition, National Museum of Singapore
- ‘A Retrospective of Contemporary Photography’, at Season Gallery, 798 Art District, Beijing, China
- ‘Lianzhou International Photography Festival’, Guangdong, China
- The 30th Hong Kong International Film Festival, Hong Kong

2005

- ‘The Amsterdam China Festival’, Amsterdam, Netherlands
- ‘Art Forum Berlin’, Alexander Ochs Galleries, Berlin

2004

- ‘What’ Art Exhibition, Shanxi Art Museum, China

2003

- ‘Crusoe-Exhibition of Contemporary Art’, Post-Modern City, Beijing, China

2002

- Signboard, China Tour In Six Major Cities

2000

- Mad Dog Crying Over Graveyard, Sonic Factory, Hong Kong

1999

- 48th Venice Biennale, Italy

1997

- ‘Methodology’, song based on Jiang Zemin’s report on the 15th NPC, China

1995

- ‘Sound of Origin’ Behavioral Art at a Fly-over, Dongbianmen, Beijing
- ‘Add One Meter to Unnamed Mountain’, Behavioral Art, Miao Feng Mountain, Beijing
- ‘New Year’s Voice’, Maxim’s Restaurant at Chongwenmen, Beijing

1993

- Founded the avant-garde artists commune ‘East Village’ of Beijing, as one of the masterminds

== Film scores ==
2018

- Hello Mr. Billionaire By Yan Fei/Peng Damo

2016

- Goodbye Mr. Loser By Yan Fei/Peng Damo
- Crosscurrent By Yang Chao
- The Wasted Times By Cheng Er

2013

- The Ideal City (Based on a Han Han Novel)

2011

- Life Is A Miracle By Gu Changwei
- Very Sorry By Ai Weiwei

2010

- An Isolated Man By Ai Weiwei
- Beautiful Life By Ai Weiwei
- Hua Hao Yue Yuan By Ai Weiwei
- San Hua By Ai Weiwei

2009

- 4851—May 12 Earthquake Student Victims List By Ai Weiwei
- Old Mom Pettitoes By Ai Weiwei
- Turtle's Road to Homeland By Dong Wensheng

2008

- Stab Me By Liu Jian

2007

- Fairy Tale By Ai Weiwei
- Tale of Stone By Dong Wensheng
- Seven Sages in Bamboo Forest By Yang Fudong
- Golden Week By Li Hongqi
- End Credit Music for Useless By Jia Zhangke

2005

- Too Much Rice By Li Hongqi
- The World By Jia Zhangke
- On Darkness Does Not Exist (Play) By Zhu Xiuyang

2004

- South of Cloud By Zhu Wen
- Ru Meng Ling By Jin Feng

2003

- Channel Cave By Zhou Xiaohu
- Eat Drink Play Joy By Ai Dan & Ai Weiwei

2002

- Mr. Honey By Zhou Xiaohu

2001

- Beautiful Mushroom Cloud By Zhou Xiaohu

1995

- Season of Taxi By Ma Yingli

== Publications ==
- Mad dog barks at the tomb《狂犬吠墓》, 2001
- The Sad Boss 《忧伤的老板》 2010
- Zuoxiao Zuzhou Guitar Tabs《左小祖咒有谱》, 2011
- Mad dog barks at the tomb(second edition)《狂犬吠墓》（再版）, 2013
- Che Pi 《扯皮》 2017
- Che Pi II 《扯皮II》 2018

== Works of art ==
- ‘Add One Meter to Unnamed Mountain’, Behavioral Art, Miao Feng Mountain, Beijing, 1995
- ‘Methodology’, song based on Jiang Zemin’s report on the 15th NPC, China 1997
- ‘I Love Contemporary Art Also’, Miao Feng Mountain, Beijing, China 2007
