= Enrique Martinez Celaya =

Cuban-born American artist

Enrique Martínez Celaya
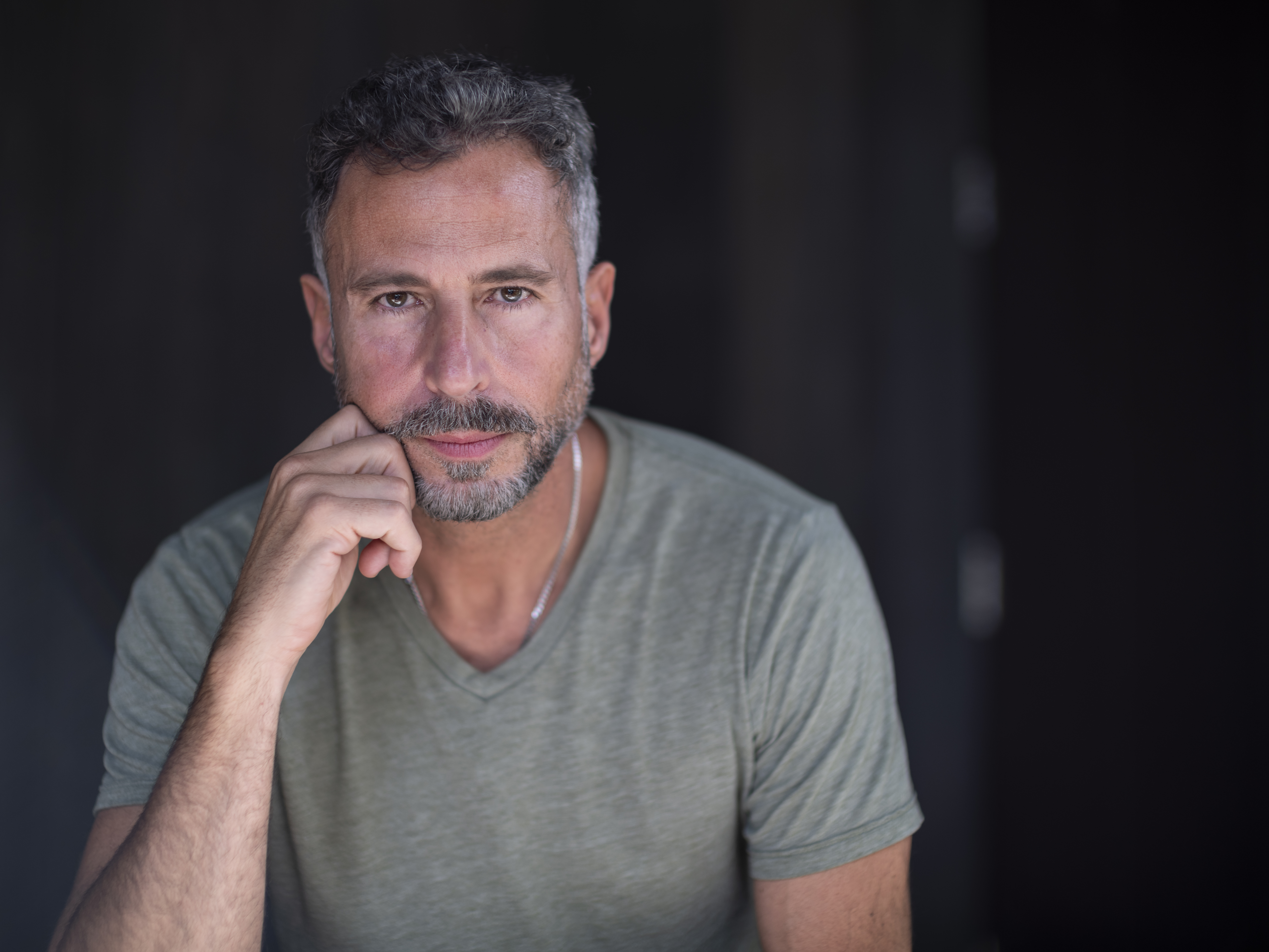
- Martínez Celaya in 2020
- Born: June 9, 1964 (age 62); Havana, Cuba
- Education: Cornell University (B.S. 1986); University of California, Berkeley (M.S. 1988); University of California, Santa Barbara (M.F.A. 1994)
- Known for: Painter, sculptor, author, educator
- Style: Contemporary
- Spouse: Alexandra Williams (m. 1999; div. 2015) Dr. Stacy A. Cohen (m. 2023; div. 2026)
- Website: martinezcelaya.com

Enrique Martínez Celaya (born June 9, 1964) is a Cuban-born American painter, sculptor, and author whose work examines the conditions of individual experience, particularly the nature of memory, exile, and the relationship between consciousness and the passage of time. Working across painting, sculpture, immersive installation, and writing, his practice resists the boundaries between disciplines, posing questions of authenticity, attachment, and loss without proposing answers. Before devoting himself to art, Martinez Celaya trained as a laser physicist at Cornell University and the University of California, Berkeley, and patented several devices before leaving science to pursue painting full-time. His work is held in the permanent collections of the Metropolitan Museum of Art, the Whitney Museum of American Art, the State Hermitage Museum, and more than sixty institutions worldwide.

== Early life and education ==
Martínez Celaya was born on June 9, 1964, in Havana, Cuba, and spent his early childhood in Nueva Paz and Los Palos, Cuba. His family relocated to Madrid, Spain in 1972. While there, he took up drawing at the age of eight. In 1975, the family relocated again, this time to Puerto Rico. He initiated his formal training as an apprentice to a painter at the age of 12 and developed his early interest in writing and philosophy.

In 1982, he enrolled at Cornell University. He graduated magna cum laude with a Bachelor of Science in applied physics and a minor in electrical engineering in 1986. He was selected as a Regent's Fellow at the University of California, Berkeley, and earned a Master of Science degree with a specialization in Quantum Electronics While there, he patented several laser devices. He later enrolled in the M.F.A. program at the University of California, Santa Barbara and graduated with highest honors in 1994. After graduation, he attended the Skowhegan School of Painting and Sculpture in Maine.

== Career ==
About his interest in literature, Martínez Celaya states, “Reading is a primary source for my work." I read philosophy and literature and that is the universe I see my work in, even though I'm a visual artist. ... Often when artists talk about writers, they're talking about them as source of content. I'm reading them for a moral stance in the world.”

Martínez Celaya has created solo museum exhibitions for the Hispanic Society Museum & Library in New York City (2024), the Museo Nacional de Bellas Artes in Havana, Cuba (2023), and the Marino Marini Museum in Florence, Italy (2023). He has also created projects for the Huntington Library, Art Museum, and Botanical Gardens in San Marino, California (2021), The Phillips Collection in Washington, D.C. (2016), and the State Hermitage Museum in St. Petersburg, Russia (2012). In 2025, The Huntington acquired eight major works spanning twenty-five years of his career, making the institution the most significant collection of the Cuban-born American artist's work. In 2026, Martínez Celaya was commissioned by LA Opera to create The Things We Know, an approximately 70-foot-wide curtain work for the Dorothy Chandler Pavilion during the company's 2026–27 season.

From 2007 to 2009, Martínez Celaya wrote a blog on his website with a selection of entries published as The Blog: Bad Time for Poetry (Whale & Star, 2010). Since 2012, the blog has continued in the form of journal entries on the artist's website. The University of Nebraska Press published a twenty-year survey of his writings in 2011, entitled Collected Writings and Interviews, 1990-2010, which was more recently followed by a second volume, Collected Writings and Interviews, 2010-2017. Martínez Celaya published a selection of lecture notes from his popular workshops, entitled On Art and Mindfulness: Notes from the Anderson Ranch (Whale & Star, 2015), in collaboration with the Anderson Ranch Art Center in Snowmass, Colorado. Martínez Celaya founded Whale and Star in 1998, an imprint specializing in art and its relationship to other intellectual and creative fields, especially literature, philosophy, and critical theory.

=== Academia ===
Martínez Celaya is currently Provost Professor of Humanities and Arts at USC (2017–present) in Los Angeles and, since 2014, a Montgomery Fellow at Dartmouth College in Hanover, New Hampshire. He was the Roth Family Distinguished Visiting Scholar at Dartmouth (2016–2017). He was Visiting Presidential Professor in the history of art at University of Nebraska–Lincoln (2007–2010), and an associate professor of art at Pomona College and the Claremont Graduate University (1993–2003). He has taught painting workshops and given lectures at Anderson Ranch Arts Center for over a decade.

In 2010, Martínez Celaya inaugurated The Lecture Project, funded with assistance from the Knight Foundation. The original programming presented lectures from academics and art critics until late 2012. In 2019, in collaboration with USC Dornsife The Lecture Project was re-launched and is currently hosting programming from Martínez Celaya's Los Angeles Studio.

== Awards and honors ==
Martínez Celaya was awarded the Brookhaven National Laboratory Fellowship (1986–1988) and was an Interdisciplinary Humanities Fellow and Regents Fellow from the University of California (1992–94). He received Los Angeles County Museum of Art's Young Talent Award (1998), the Hirsch Grant (2002), the Rosa Blanca Award from the Cuban Community (2002), and the California Community Foundation Fellowship, Getty Foundation Award (2004). He was honored with the Inaugural Colorado Contemporary Arts Collaborative Artist Residency at the CU Art Museum, sponsored by Kent and Vicki Logan (2004), and received the Anderson Ranch Arts Center's International Artist Award (2007). In 2020, Martínez Celaya was awarded a Doctor Honoris Causa from Otis College of Art and Design. He was invited to give the college's commencement address the same year, and in 2021 joined the Otis College Board of Governors. In 2021, Martínez Celaya also became the inaugural fellow of the Robinson Jeffers Tor House Foundation. In 2025, Martínez Celaya received the USC Associates Award, the highest honor the University of Southern California faculty bestows for distinguished intellectual and artistic achievement.

== Personal life ==
Martínez Celaya spent his early life with his brothers, Carlos and Fernando early life in Cuba, Spain, Puerto Rico, and the United States which were formative to his outlook and work.

He has maintained a private life outside his work. Martínez Celaya has also designed and remodeled homes and studios as part of his artistic practice, including his Bel Air home and his Jefferson Park studio in Los Angeles.

Martínez Celaya has participated in athletics since childhood. In his youth, he competed as an 800-meter runner and practiced taekwondo, and he has continued to train in boxing as an adult.

Martínez Celaya has maintained friendships and collaborations with figures in the arts, sciences, and academia including Martin Brest, Roald Hoffmann, James Hollis, Leon Golub and J. B. Milliken.

Curator Klaus Ottmann, who paired Martínez Celaya's work with paintings by Albert Pinkham Ryder at The Phillips Collection in Washington, D.C., described him as having "an encyclopedic curiosity." Collector and philanthropist Jorge Pérez said of him, "He is not static. He is always growing."

Martínez Celaya lives and works in Los Angeles, California.

Martínez Celaya married Alexandra Williams, the daughter of American journalist Christian Williams, in 1999. They have four children together. They later divorced in 2015. In 2023, he married the psychiatrist Stacy A. Cohen. The couple divorced in 2026.
