= Cities 97 Sampler =

Compilation album series

The Cities 97.1 Sampler (also titled Cities Sampler and The Cities' Sampler) was a series of albums, cassette tapes and CDs containing "live in studio" recordings from Studio C located at radio station Cities 97.1, KTCZ-FM in Minneapolis at 97.1 MHz. It occasionally contained live tracks recorded from local concerts in the Twin Cities. It was released annually during the holidays from 1989 to 2018. New volumes would appear each November at local Target stores in time for Christmas gifts. In later years the sampler was also available on Target.com. Proceeds benefited Minnesota charitable organizations. The albums, cassettes and CDs usually generated over $500,000 every year for Minnesota charities. In the last several years, the recordings sold quickly, disappearing within minutes in many stores.

The 16th volume, released on November 11, 2004, had a print run of about 35,000 copies. In Forest Lake, Minnesota, the local Target store ran out of its shipment of discs in seven minutes.

On October 1, 2018, KTCZ-FM announced that the upcoming sampler (volume 30) would be the last. It sold out in stores the same day and online later that night after a technical glitch was resolved freeing the remaining copies for online purchase. Throughout the 30 years of its run, the sampler raised over $13 million for Minnesota non-profits and charities.

== Cities 97 Sampler Vol. 1: The Cities' Sampler (1989) ==
Pressings: 10,000 Format: Cassette tape & CD

1. Bruce Cockburn – "If a Tree Falls"
2. Yanni – "Street Level"
3. Al Stewart – "Year of the Cat"
4. Leo Kottke – "Mona Ray"
5. Oceans – "Second Chance"
6. Peter Himmelman – "It's Not in Vain"
7. Chris Daniels – "When You're Cool (the Sun Shines All the Time)"
8. Marti Jones – "Tourist Town"
9. Richard Souther – "Cross Currents"
10. 'Til Tuesday – "J For Jules"
11. Kenny G – "Silhouette"
12. David Lanz / Paul Speer – "Behind The Waterfall"
13. Bruce Hornsby – "Till the Dreaming's Done"

== The Cities' Sampler Vol. 2: Collectibles (1990) ==
Pressings: 10,000 Format: Cassette tape & CD

1. U2 – "Hallelujah Here She Comes"
2. Mannheim Steamroller – "Skateboard"
3. Stan Meissner – "One Chance"
4. Melissa Etheridge – "You Can Sleep While I Drive"
5. Bobby Schnitzer – "Summer Samba"
6. David Wilcox – "Four Lane Dance / Saturday They'll Be Back Again"
7. Bob Marley – "Waiting in Vain"
8. Ottmar Liebert – "Surrender 2 Love"
9. Gregson & Collister – "This Tender Trap"
10. Shawn Colvin – "Steady On"
11. Eric Tingstad and Nancy Rumbel – "Immigrant"
12. Cowboy Junkies – "Decoration Day"
13. Ralf Illenberger – "Marimba (Rain Dance)"

== The Cities' Sampler Vol. 3: Songs for the Earth (1991) ==
Pressings: 10,000 Format: Cassette tape & CD

1. Sting – "We Work the Black Seam"
2. Merl Saunders featuring Jerry Garcia – "Blues from the Rainforest"
3. Chris Rea – "The Road to Hell"
4. Nils Lofgren – "Silver Lining"
5. Edie Brickell and the New Bohemians – "A Hard Rain's a-Gonna Fall"
6. Hoopsnakes – "The River Trail"
7. 10,000 Maniacs – "Poison in the Well"
8. Hothouse Flowers – "Giving It All Away"
9. Ann Reed – "Styrofoam"
10. Vinnie James – "Here Goes Tomorrow"
11. Roger McGuinn – "The Trees Are All Gone"
12. Midnight Oil – "Antarctica"
13. David Arkenstone – "Yosemite"

== The Cities' Sampler Vol. 4: Keepsakes (1992) ==
Pressings: 12,000 Format: Cassette tape & CD

1. Gary Moore – "Story of the Blues"
2. James Taylor – "Pretty Boy Floyd"
3. Del Amitri – "This Side of the Morning"
4. Wailing Souls – "Shark Attack"
5. Sarah McLachlan – "The Path of Thorns (Terms)"
6. Modern Relics – "Blue House"
7. Chris Isaak – "Wicked Game"
8. The Rembrandts – "Just The Way It Is, Baby"
9. Holiday Ranch – "Separation"
10. Crash Test Dummies – "Superman's Song"
11. Lowen and Navarro – "We Belong"
12. Peter Buffett – "Jenny C"
13. The BoDeans – "Good Things"

== The Cities' Sampler Vol. 5: Rarities (1993) ==
Pressings: 12,000 Format: Cassette tape & CD

1. Bruce Hornsby – "Passing Through (Live)"
2. Melissa Etheridge – "Yes I Am (Live)"
3. Sonia Dada – "You Ain't Thinkin' (About Me)"
4. Judybats – "Being Simple"
5. Big Head Todd and the Monsters – "Bittersweet"
6. Widespread Panic – "Wondering"
7. 4 Non Blondes - "What's Up"
8. Jeff Arundel – "No Escape"
9. Dada – "Dog"
10. Zachary Richard – "Come on Sheila"
11. David Baerwald – "China Lake"
12. Marc Cohn – "The Rainy Season"
13. David Lanz / Paul Speer – "Out of the Shadows"

== The Cities' Sampler Vol. 6: Gems (1994) ==
Format: Cassette tape & CD

1. Gin Blossoms – "Allison Road"
2. Indigo Girls – "Three Hits"
3. Billy Pilgrim – "Get Me out of Here"
4. Freddy Jones Band – "In a Daydream"
5. October Project – "Bury My Lovely"
6. Bruce Cockburn – "Tie Me at the Crossroads"
7. Kenny Loggins – "Return to Pooh Corner"
8. Sam Phillips – "Baby I Can't Please You"
9. The Delilahs – "Who's Gonna Stop Me"
10. Ben Harper – "Walk Away"
11. David Arkenstone – "Under the Canopy"
12. Peter Himmelman – "Dixie the Tiny Dog"

== The Cities' Sampler Vol. 7: Essentials (1995) ==
Format: Cassette tape & CD

1. Little Feat – "Romance Without Finance"
2. Freedy Johnston – "Bad Reputation"
3. Dave Matthews Band – "Ants Marching"
4. Shawn Colvin – "Window to the World"
5. Martin Zellar – "East Side Boys"
6. Sonny Landreth – "South of I-10"
7. Paula Cole – "Happy Home"
8. Billy Pilgrim – "Sweet Louisiana Sound"
9. Todd Snider – "Alright Guy"
10. The Jayhawks – "Waiting for the Sun"
11. Tina and the B-Side Movement - "Paper Doll"
12. Big Mountain – "Fruitful Days"
13. James McMurtry – "Melinda"

== Cities 97 Sampler Vol. 8 (1996) ==
Format: Cassette tape & CD

1. The Wallflowers – "6th Avenue Heartache"
2. Keb' Mo' – "That's Not Love"
3. The Why Store – "Lack of Water"
4. Amanda Marshall – "Birmingham"
5. Del Amitri – "Tell Her This"
6. Anders Osborne – "Pleasin' You"
7. Bob Dylan – "A Hard Rain's a-Gonna Fall"
8. Edwin McCain – "Alive"
9. The Badlees – "Fear of Falling"
10. Brian Setzer and His Orchestra – "Rumble in Brighton"
11. Paul Cebar & the Milwaukeeans – "Bright Night Train"
12. Lyle Lovett – "Private Conversation"
13. Jackopierce – "Trials"
14. The Freddy Jones Band – "Hold on to Midnight"
15. Golden Smog – "Ill Fated"
16. Dog's Eye View – "Everything Falls Apart"
17. Jeff Arundel – "Harmon Killebrew"

== Cities 97 Sampler Vol. 9 (1997) ==
Format: CD

1. Sister Hazel – "All for You"
2. Widespread Panic – "Hope in a Hopeless World"
3. Duncan Sheik – "Barely Breathing"
4. Jonny Lang – "Lie to Me"
5. Storyville – "Bitter Rain"
6. Corey Stevens – "It's Over"
7. Ugly Americans – "Vulcan Death Grip (Of Love)"
8. Tim Mahoney – "Talk to Me"
9. Chalk Farm – "Lie on Lie"
10. Luther Allison – "Move from the Hood"
11. Abra Moore – "Four Leaf Clover"
12. The Honeydogs – "Your Blue Door"
13. Semisonic – "FNT"

== Cities Sampler Vol. 10 (1998) ==
Format: CD

1. Marc Cohn – "Walking in Memphis"
2. Sister 7 – "Know What You Mean"
3. Eagle-Eye Cherry – "Save Tonight"
4. Kenny Wayne Shepherd – "Blue on Black"
5. Shawn Colvin – "Sunny Came Home"
6. Everything – "Hooch"
7. Semisonic – "Closing Time"
8. Cowboy Junkies – "Miles from Our Home"
9. Barenaked Ladies – "Break Your Heart"
10. The Connells – "Crown"
11. Susan Tedeschi – "You Need to Be with Me"
12. Fastball – "The Way"
13. Martin Zellar and the Hardways – "Time and Time Again"
14. Alana Davis – "Crazy"
15. Agents of Good Roots – "Smiling up the Frown"
16. Patty Griffin – "One Big Love"
17. Grant Lee Buffalo – "Truly, Truly"
18. Sonia Dada – "You Don't Love Me Anymore"

== Cities Sampler Vol. 11 Radio Playlist Collection (1999) ==
Pressings: 27,000 Format: CD

1. Natalie Merchant – "Break Your Heart"
2. Jeremy Toback – "You Make Me Feel"
3. Shawn Mullins – "Shimmer"
4. Kim Richey – "Come Around"
5. The Push Stars – "Minnesota"
6. Sheryl Crow – "Anything but Down"
7. Los Lobos – "Oh Yeah"
8. Julian Lennon – "It's Good to Be Lonely"
9. Sinéad Lohan – "No Mermaid"
10. Fastball – "Fire Escape"
11. David Wilcox – "Never Enough"
12. Shannon Curfman – "I Don't Make Promises (I Can't Break)"
13. Old 97's – "Murder (or a Heart Attack)"
14. The Gufs – "Surrounded"
15. Joe Henry – "She Was a Hammer"
16. Mick Sterling – "Soul of a Woman"
17. Tangletown – "See Right Through"

== Cities 97 Sampler Vol. 12 New Names + New Music (2000) ==
Pressings: 27,000 Format: CD

1. Jonny Lang – "Breakin' Me"
2. The Pretenders – "Human"
3. Train – "I Am"
4. Melissa Etheridge – "Angels Would Fall"
5. Counting Crows – "A Long December"
6. Daniel Cage – "Sleepwalking"
7. Beth Hart – "L.A. Song"
8. Sister Hazel – "Change Your Mind"
9. The Jayhawks – "I'm Gonna Make You Love Me"
10. Tracy Chapman – "Three Little Birds"
11. Lyle Lovett – "What Do You Do"
12. Kevin Bowe – "Sweeter World"
13. Bruce Cockburn – "Last Night of the World"
14. Pat McGee Band – "Runaway"
15. Shelby Lynne – "Life Is Bad"
16. Martin Zellar – "Blown Kisses"
17. John Hiatt – "Before I Go"
18. Cracker – "Be My Love"

== Cities 97 Sampler Vol. 13 (2001) ==
Pressings: 30,000 Format: CD

1. David Gray – "Babylon"
2. Blues Traveler – "Run-Around"
3. Five for Fighting – "Easy Tonight"
4. Dido – "Here with Me"
5. The Wallflowers – "Sleepwalker"
6. Semisonic – "Chemistry"
7. The BoDeans – "Fadeaway"
8. Travis – "Sing"
9. Bob Schneider – "Metal and Steel"
10. Tonic – "If You Could Only See"
11. Coldplay – "Yellow"
12. Iffy – "Double Dutch"
13. The Cranberries – "Analyse"
14. Josh Joplin Group – "Camera One"
15. Lifehouse – "Hanging by a Moment"
16. John Hiatt – "Ridin' with the King"

== Cities 97 Sampler Vol. 14 (2002) ==
Pressings: 30,000 Format: CD

1. John Mayer – "No Such Thing"
2. Shannon McNally – "Now That I Know"
3. The Calling – "Wherever You Will Go"
4. Dishwalla – "Somewhere in the Middle"
5. Five for Fighting – "Superman (It's Not Easy)"
6. Natalie Merchant – "Just Can't Last"
7. Big Head Todd and the Monsters – "Again and Again"
8. David Gray – "Sail Away"
9. Rubyhorse – "Sparkle"
10. Indigo Girls – "Moment of Forgiveness"
11. Coldplay – "Trouble"
12. Nickelback – "How You Remind Me"
13. David Pirner – "Never Recover"
14. Gin Blossoms – "Til I Hear It from You"
15. Pete Yorn – "Strange Condition"
16. Suzanne Vega – "Widow's Walk"
17. Bob Schneider – "Big Blue Sea"
18. Bonnie Raitt – "Fool's Game"
19. Elvis Costello – "45"

== Cities 97 Sampler Vol. 15 15th Anniversary (2003) ==
Pressings: 30,000 Format: CD

1. Jason Mraz – "The Remedy (I Won't Worry)"
2. Counting Crows – "Miami"
3. Kathleen Edwards – "Six O'Clock News"
4. Coldplay – "Clocks"
5. Nickel Creek – "Smoothie Song"
6. Tori Amos – "Strange"
7. Matchbox Twenty – "Push"
8. Jack Johnson – "The Horizon Has Been Defeated"
9. The Thorns – "I Can't Remember"
10. Ben Harper – "She's Only Happy in the Sun"
11. Ziggy Marley – "True to Myself"
12. John Hiatt – "Memphis In the Meantime"
13. Alice Peacock – "Bliss"
14. Guster – "Amsterdam"
15. The Suburbs – "Life Is Like"
16. Eastmountainsouth – "You Dance"
17. The BoDeans – "Good Things"
18. Peter Himmelman – "Dixie the Tiny Dog"

== Cities 97 Sampler Vol. 16 (2004) ==
Pressings: 35,000 Format: CD

1. Sting – "Fields of Gold"
2. Sarah McLachlan – "Angel"
3. Finn Brothers – "Won't Give In"
4. John Mayer – "Clarity"
5. Jonny Lang – "Red Light"
6. The Jayhawks – "Save It for a Rainy Day"
7. Dido – "White Flag"
8. Five for Fighting – "100 Years"
9. Damien Rice – "Volcano"
10. Alanis Morissette – "Ironic"
11. Maroon 5 – "This Love"
12. Keri Noble – "Talk to Me"
13. Guster – "Careful"
14. Trip Shakespeare – "Snow Days"
15. R.E.M. – "Electrolite"
16. Bob Schneider – "Come With Me Tonight"
17. Big Head Todd and the Monsters – "Bittersweet"
18. Jason Mraz – "You and I Both"

== Cities 97 Sampler Vol. 17 (2005) ==
Pressings: 35,000 Format: CD

1. Howie Day – "Collide"
2. Rachael Yamagata – "Worn Me Down"
3. Snow Patrol – "Chocolate"
4. Los Lonely Boys – "Heaven"
5. Joss Stone – "Right to Be Wrong"
6. Lenny Kravitz – "Believe"
7. David Gray – "The One I Love"
8. Mike Doughty – "Looking at the World..."
9. Anna Nalick – "Breathe (2 AM)"
10. Blue Merle – "Burning in the Sun"
11. Jamie Cullum – "All at Sea"
12. Ben Lee – "Catch My Disease"
13. Ringside – "Tired of Being Sorry"
14. Mindy Smith – "Come to Jesus"
15. Better Than Ezra – "A Lifetime"
16. Carbon Leaf – "Life Less Ordinary"
17. Mark Knopfler – "Brothers in Arms"

== Cities 97 Sampler Vol. 18 (2006) ==
Pressings: 35,000 Format: CD

1. Amos Lee – "Keep It Loose, Keep It Tight"
2. The Fray – "Over My Head (Cable Car)"
3. Katie Melua – "Just Like Heaven"
4. Dave Matthews Band – "Dreamgirl"
5. Mat Kearney – "Nothing Left to Lose"
6. Bonnie Raitt – "I Will Not Be Broken"
7. Shawn Mullins – "Beautiful Wreck"
8. Snow Patrol – "Chasing Cars"
9. KT Tunstall – "Black Horse and the Cherry Tree"
10. Death Cab for Cutie – "Soul Meets Body"
11. Sia – "Breathe Me"
12. Dan Wilson– "Baby Doll"
13. Goo Goo Dolls – "Better Days"
14. Sonya Kitchell – "Let Me Go"
15. James Blunt – "High"
16. Guster – "One Man Wrecking Machine"
17. Honeydogs – "I Miss You"
18. Train – "Cab"

== Cities 97 Sampler Vol. 19 I-35W Bridge Collapse (2007) ==
Pressings: 30,000 Format: CD

1. Shawn Colvin – "Crazy"
2. Ryan Adams – "Two"
3. John Mayer – "Your Body Is a Wonderland"
4. Augustana – "Boston"
5. Colin Hay – "Overkill"
6. Colbie Caillat – "The Little Things"
7. Lifehouse – "First Time"
8. Sarah McLachlan – "Push"
9. Plain White T's – "Hey There Delilah"
10. Corinne Bailey Rae – "Put Your Records On"
11. Gomez – "See The World"
12. Patty Griffin – "Heavenly Day"
13. G. Love – "Beautiful"
14. Mozella – "Amnesia"
15. Damien Rice – "9 Crimes"
16. Brandi Carlile – "The Story"
17. Romantica – "Fiona"
18. Keane – "Nothing In My Way"
19. Counting Crows – "Anna Begins"

== Cities 97 Sampler Vol. 20 20th Anniversary (2008) ==
Pressings: 30,000 Format: CD

Disc One

1. Jason Mraz – "I'm Yours"
2. Needtobreathe – "More Time"
3. Ingrid Michaelson – "The Way I Am"
4. David Gray – "Twilight"
5. Matt Nathanson – "Come On Get Higher"
6. Duffy – "Mercy"
7. Matchbox Twenty – "3AM"
8. A Fine Frenzy – "Almost Lover"
9. Gavin Rossdale – "Love Remains The Same"
10. Bell X1 – "Eve the Apple of my Eye"
11. Darius Rucker – "Let Her Cry"
12. Jeremy Messersmith – "7:02"
13. Sara Bareilles – "Love Song"
14. Brett Dennen – "Ain't No Reason"
15. Landon Pigg – "Falling in Love at a Coffee Shop"
16. Lowen and Navarro – "We Belong"

Disc Two

1. Missy Higgins – "Where I Stood"
2. Jack Johnson – "Times Like These"
3. Sheryl Crow – "Love Is Free"
4. BoDeans – "Hearing"
5. OneRepublic – "Stop and Stare"
6. Brandi Carlile – "Turpentine"
7. Eric Hutchinson – "Rock and Roll"
8. Augustana – "Sweet and Low"
9. Tristan Prettyman – "Madly"
10. The Waterboys – "Fisherman's Blues"
11. Dave Barnes – "Until You"
12. Brendan James – "Hero's Song"
13. Newton Faulkner – "Teardrop"
14. The Glad Version – "Can't Wait For October"
15. Paolo Nutini – "Everybody's Talkin'"

Album artwork designed by Jenny Plott at Spangler Design Team

== Cities 97 Sampler Vol. 21 Road Trip Tunes (2009) ==
Pressings: 30,000 Format: CD

1. Jason Mraz – "1,000 Things"
2. Ingrid Michaelson – "Maybe"
3. Rob Thomas – "Her Diamonds"
4. Donavon Frankenreiter – "Life, Love and Laughter"
5. Erin McCarley – "Pitter Pat"
6. Eric Hutchinson – "OK, It's Alright With Me"
7. Snow Patrol – "Crack the Shutters"
8. Matt Nathanson – "All We Are"
9. The Fray – "You Found Me"
10. Cary Brothers – "Blue Eyes"
11. Adele – "Right as Rain"
12. Jakob Dylan – "Something Good This Way Comes"
13. Parachute – "She Is Love"
14. James Morrison – "Nothing Ever Hurt Like You"
15. Tyrone Wells – "More"
16. Amos Lee – "What's Been Goin' On"
17. The Jayhawks – "Two Hearts"
18. Mat Kearney – "Closer To Love"
19. Meredith Fierke – "Train's Song"
20. Ray LaMontagne – "You Are The Best Thing"

Album artwork designed by Jenny Plott at Spangler Design Team

== Cities 97 Sampler Vol. 22 Live From Studio C (2010) ==
Pressings: 33,000 Format: CD Retail: $24.97

1. One eskimO – "Kandi"
2. Lifehouse – "Halfway Gone"
3. Brandi Carlile – "That Year"
4. David Gray – "Fugitive"
5. Five For Fighting – "Chances"
6. Sara Bareilles – "King of Anything"
7. Amos Lee – "Learned A Lot"
8. The Avett Brothers – "I & Love & You"
9. Sarah McLachlan – "Forgiveness"
10. Rogue Valley – "Rope Swing Over Rogue Valley"
11. Guster – "Do You Love Me"
12. Keane – "My Shadow"
13. Colbie Caillat – "Fallin' for You"
14. Big Head Todd & The Monsters – "Broken Hearted Savior"
15. Court Yard Hounds – "The Coast"
16. Cedar Avenue – "7 Years"
17. John Mayer – "Heartbreak Warfare"
18. Ingrid Michaelson – "Ode to Mexican Food"

Bonus tracks for Frequent Listener Club Members (free digital download):

1. Cedar Avenue – "After All"
2. Big Head Todd & The Monsters – "Beautiful"
3. One eskimO – "Amazing"
4. Train – "Hey, Soul Sister"

Album artwork designed by Melissa Schmitt at Spangler Design Team

== Cities 97 Sampler Vol. 23 (2011) ==
1. Adele – "Someone Like You"
2. Amos Lee – "Windows Are Rolled Down"
3. Matt Nathanson – "Faster"
4. The Head & The Heart – "Lost In My Mind"
5. Sara Bareilles – "Uncharted"
6. Fitz and the Tantrums – "We Don't Gotta Work It Out"
7. Ray LaMontagne & The Pariah Dogs – "For the Summer"
8. Lissie – "When I'm Alone"
9. Mat Kearney – "Hey Mama"
10. Neon Trees – "Animal"
11. Scars on 45 – "Heart on Fire"
12. O.A.R. – "Heaven"
13. David Gray – "Only the Wine"
14. Farewell Milwaukee – "Always Be Your Man"
15. Mumford & Sons – "The Cave"
16. Ellie Goulding – "Lights"
17. The Civil Wars – "Poison & Wine"
18. Florence + The Machine – "Dog Days Are Over"
19. Michael Franti & Spearhead – "Say Hey (I Love You)"

Album artwork designed by Melissa Schmitt at Spangler Design Team

== Cities 97 Sampler Vol. 24 (2012) ==
1. Brandi Carlile – "That Wasn't Me"
2. Tyrone Wells – "Freedom"
3. Tristan Prettyman – "My Oh My"
4. The Fray – "Heartbeat"
5. Mayer Hawthorne – "The Walk"
6. Haley Reinhart – "Free"
7. Eric Hutchinson – "Watching You Watch Him"
8. Ed Sheeran – "The A Team"
9. Imagine Dragons – "It's Time"
10. Gavin DeGraw – "Not Over You"
11. The Lumineers – "Ho Hey"
12. Meiko – "Stuck On You"
13. Grouplove – "Tongue Tied"
14. Foster the People – "Pumped Up Kicks"
15. Dessa – "Dixon's Girl"
16. Jason Mraz – "I Won't Give Up"
17. Graffiti6 – "Free"
18. Missy Higgins – "Hello Hello"
19. Of Monsters and Men – "Little Talks"

Bonus tracks for Frequent Listener Club Members (free digital download):

1. Ingrid Michaelson – Ghost
2. Meiko – Leave the Lights On
3. Ben Howard – Black Flies

Album artwork designed by Jeff Kaphingst at Spangler Design Team

== Cities 97 Sampler Vol. 25 25th Anniversary (2013) ==
Pressings: 40,000 Retail: $32.97

Disc One

1. Capital Cities – "Safe and Sound"
2. Tristan Prettyman – "Say Anything"
3. Alpha Rev – "Sing Loud"
4. Amos Lee – "The Man Who Wants You"
5. Bomba De Luz – "Starting to Choke II"
6. Phillip Phillips – "Home"
7. ZZ Ward – "Put the Gun Down"
8. Passenger – "Let Her Go"
9. Neon Trees – "Everybody Talks"
10. Vicci Martinez – "Come Along"
11. Charlie Mars – "I Do I Do"
12. The Airborne Toxic Event – "Timeless"
13. Atlas Genius – "If So"
14. The Wild Feathers – "The Ceiling"
15. Chastity Brown – "Slow Time"
16. Fun – "Carry On"

Disc Two

1. Family of the Year – "Hero"
2. Matt Nathanson – "Mission Bells"
3. Keri Noble – "Make Me Crazy"
4. Walk Off the Earth – "Red Hands"
5. Serena Ryder – "Stompa"
6. The Unlikely Candidates – "Follow My Feet"
7. Delta Rae – "If I Loved You"
8. The Mowgli's – "San Francisco"
9. Farewell Milwaukee – "Can't Please You, Can't Please Me"
10. Grace Potter & The Nocturnals – "Stars"
11. Matt Hires – "Restless Heart"
12. Tegan and Sara – "Closer"
13. Walk the Moon – "Anna Sun"
14. Lissie – "They All Want You"
15. The Kopecky Family Band – "Heartbeat"
16. Matchbox Twenty – "Overjoyed"
17. Fitz and the Tantrums – "Out of My League"

Album artwork designed by Melissa Schmitt at Spangler Design Team

== Cities 97 Sampler Vol. 26 (2014) ==
Pressings: 35,000 Retail: $25.97

1. The 1975 – "Chocolate"
2. Delta Rae – "Bottom of the River"
3. Ben Rector – "Beautiful"
4. Sleeper Agent – "Waves"
5. American Authors – "Believer"
6. Ingrid Michaelson – "Girls Chase Boys"
7. Bleachers – "I Wanna Get Better"
8. Neon Trees – "Sleeping With a Friend"
9. Jillette Johnson – "Torpedo"
10. Phillip Phillips – "Gone, Gone, Gone"
11. Scars on 45 – "Crazy For You"
12. Echosmith – "Cool Kids"
13. Eric Hutchinson – "Tell the World"
14. Ed Sheeran – "Sing"
15. ZZ Ward – "Last Love Song"
16. Brett Dennen – "Out of My Head"
17. Birdy – "Skinny Love"
18. Aloe Blacc – "Wake Me Up"
19. Mary Lambert – "Secrets"

Album artwork designed by Melissa Schmitt at Spangler Design Team

== Cities 97 Sampler Vol. 27 (2015) ==
Pressings: 30,000 Retail: $22.97

1. Rachel Platten – "Fight Song"
2. Matt Hires – "Hold You Up"
3. Vance Joy – "Rip Tide"
4. ZZ Ward – "Love 3X"
5. WALK THE MOON – "Shut Up and Dance"
6. O.A.R. – "Peace"
7. Andrew McMahon in the Wilderness – "Cecilia and the Satellite"
8. Jamie Scott – "Story of My Life"
9. Colbie Caillat – "Try"
10. Sheppard – "Geronimo"
11. Elle King – "Ex's & Oh's"
12. Matt Kearney – "Billion"
13. Echosmith – "Bright"
14. Nate Ruess – "Great Big Storm"
15. Meiko – "Be Mine"
16. Nick Fradiani – "Beautiful Life"
17. Leona Lewis – "Thunder"

Album artwork designed by Melissa Schmitt at Schmitt Creative

== Cities 97 Sampler Vol. 28 (2016) ==
1. Ben Rector - "Brand New"
2. Mary Lambert - "She Keeps Me Warm"
3. X Ambassadors - "Renegades"
4. Jamie Lawson - "Wasn't Expecting That"
5. Andy Grammer - "Honey, I'm Good"
6. High Dive Heart - "Vintage"
7. Andra Day - "Rise Up"
8. Johnny Rzeznik - "So Alive"
9. Dessa - "Skeleton Key"
10. Blue October - "Home"
11. Ingrid Michaelson - "Hell No"
12. Brendan James - "Bring My Love Home"
13. American Authors - "What We Live For"
14. Rachel Platten - "Better Place"
15. Cobi - "Don't You Cry For Me"
16. Charlie Puth - "One Call Away"
17. Hailey Knox - "Awkward"
18. O.A.R. - "I Go Through"
19. LÉON - "Tired of Talking"
20. George Ezra - "Budapest"

Album artwork designed by Melissa Schmitt at Schmitt Creative

== Cities 97 Sampler Vol. 29 (2017) ==
1. Ocean Park Standoff - "Good News"
2. Joseph - "White Flag"
3. Andy Grammer Feat LunchMoney Lewis - "Give Love"
4. Maggie Rogers - "Alaska"
5. Andrew McMahon - "Fire Escapes"
6. Tom Walker - "Just You and I"
7. Judah and the Lion - "Take It All Back"
8. The Revivalists - "Wish I Knew You"
9. Alternate Routes - "Safe Haven"
10. James Blunt - "OK"
11. LP - "Lost on You"
12. James Arthur - "Say You Won't Let Go"
13. Muna - "I Know a Place"
14. John Rzeznik - "Use Me"
15. Julia Brennan - "Inner Demons"
16. Fitz and the Tantrums - "HandClap"
17. Tom Odell - "Magnetised"
18. Shawn Hook - "Reminding Me"
19. Phillip Phillips - "Miles"

Album artwork designed by Melissa Schmitt at Schmitt Creative

== Cities 97 Sampler Vol. 30 The Final Chapter (2018) ==
A dedication to all of the Minnesota charities that have been helped by Sampler sales over the past 30 years.

Retail: $14.97

1. Leon Bridges - "Beyond"
2. Matt Nathanson – "Used to Be"
3. Echosmith – "Over My Head"
4. Ocean Park Standoff – "If You Were Mine"
5. Portugal. The Man – "Live in the Moment"
6. ZZ Ward – "Domino"
7. Ben Rector – "Drive"
8. Andy Grammer – "Fresh Eyes"
9. Alana Davis – "32 Flavors"
10. Tim Mahoney – "Lucky Ones"
11. Bad Wolves – "Zombie"
12. Jade Bird – "Lottery"
13. Plain White T's – "Your Body"
14. Blue October – "I Hope You're Happy"
15. Rozzi – "Never Over You"
16. Judah & the Lion – "Suit and Jacket"
17. A Great Big World – "Younger"
18. Amy Shark – "I Said Hi"
19. Imagine Dragons – "Destination"

Album artwork designed by Melissa Schmitt at Schmitt Creative
