= Studio: Selected Studio Recordings 1986–1995 =

Greatest hits album by Cowboy Junkies
- Released: November 12, 1996
- Recorded: June 28, 1986 – June 1995
- Genres: Alternative country, indie rock, blues rock
- Length: 1:00:19
- Label: RCA

Cowboy Junkies chronology
Lay It Down (1996)	Studio: Selected Studio Recordings 1986–1995 (1996)	Miles from Our Home (1998)

Professional ratings
Review scores
Source	Rating
AllMusic	4.5/5 stars
Encyclopedia of Popular Music	4/5 stars

Studio: Selected Studio Recordings 1986–1995 is an album by the Canadian alt-country band Cowboy Junkies, released in 1996.

== Album information ==
It is a greatest hits compilation of singles from the band's albums on RCA Records, and their last official release for that label. (Two compilations, Best of the Cowboy Junkies and Platinum & Gold Collection, were released later by the label in the 2000s without the band's participation.) The band's first studio album on Geffen Records, Lay It Down, was released earlier the same year, however Studio also includes the song "A Common Disaster" from Lay it Down. Studio is also the only official Cowboy Junkies album to include the band's studio version of David Wiffen's "Lost My Driving Wheel", which the band recorded for the 1993 benefit album Born to Choose. The song does, however, appear on some import versions of Black Eyed Man.

== Track listing ==
All tracks are written by Michael Timmins, except where noted.

No.	Title	Writer(s)	Length
1.	"Shining Moon"	Lightnin' Hopkins	4:08
2.	"Misguided Angel"	Michael Timmins, Margo Timmins	4:56
3.	"Blue Moon Revisited (Song for Elvis)"	Michael Timmins, Margo Timmins, Richard Rodgers, Lorenz Hart	4:29
4.	"Sweet Jane"	Lou Reed	3:36
5.	"Sun Comes Up, It's Tuesday Morning"		3:56
6.	"Cause Cheap Is How I Feel"		4:15
7.	"Powderfinger"	Neil Young	5:46
8.	"Southern Rain"		4:50
9.	"A Horse in the Country"		3:49
10.	"This Street, That Man, This Life"		3:13
11.	"Anniversary Song"		3:11
12.	"Ring on the Sill"		4:22
13.	"A Common Disaster"		3:22
14.	"Lost My Driving Wheel"	David Wiffen	6:26
Total length:			1:00:19
