= Alright with Me (disambiguation) =

"Alright with Me" is a 2015 song by British rapper Wretch 32, featuring vocals from Anne-Marie and PRGRSHN.

Alright with Me may also refer to:

- "Alright with Me", a 2010 single by Kris Allen from his self-titled 2009 album
- "Alright With Me (Taking It Easy)", a 2002 single by Carly Binding
- "Alright with Me", a 2006 single by Terri Walker
- "Alright with Me", a song by Ian McNabb on his 2001 self-titled album
- "Alright with Me", a song by KRS-One from his 2003 album Kristyles
- "Alright with Me", a song by The Jacksons from their 1989 album 2300 Jackson Street

== See also ==
- "It's All Right with Me", a popular song written by Cole Porter for his 1953 musical Can-Can
- It's Alright with Me (disambiguation)
- "That's Alright with Me", a 1965 single by the Modern Folk Quartet
- "OK, It's Alright With Me", a song by Eric Hutchinson on his 2008 album Sounds Like This
- "He's Alright With Me", a 1988 single by Carter Cornelius
- "The Girl's Alright with Me", a 1964 song recorded by The Temptations
