= It's Alright with Me (disambiguation) =

It's Alright with Me is a 1979 album, or the title song, by Patti LaBelle.

It's Alright with Me may also refer to:

- "It's Alright with Me", a song written by Dave Torbert for New Riders of the Purple Sage on their 1973 album The Adventures of Panama Red
- "It's Alright with Me", a song written by Rod Argent for The Zombies on their 1964 self-titled EP
- "It's Alright with Me", a song written by Jackson Leap for George Strait on his 1992 album Holding My Own
- "It's Alright with Me", a song written by Jorma Kaukonen for Hot Tuna on their 1990 album Pair a Dice Found

== See also ==
- "It's All Right with Me", a popular song written by Cole Porter and first sung by Peter Cookson in Porter's 1953 musical Can-Can
- "It's Alright With Me Girl", a song by Clarence Clemons on his 1985 album Hero
- Alright with Me (disambiguation)
- "OK, It's Alright With Me", a song by Eric Hutchinson on his 2008 album Sounds Like This
