= The Galaxy Kings =

Studio album by Bob Schneider
- Released: August 8, 2002
- Genre: Rock
- Length: 43:15
- Label: Vanguard
- Producer: Mark Addison

Bob Schneider chronology
Lonelyland (2001)	The Galaxy Kings (2002)	I Have Seen the End of the World and It Looks Like This (2003)

The Galaxy Kings is an album by Austin, Texas, singer-songwriter Bob Schneider, released in a limited edition of 1000 copies by Vanguard Records in 2002.

== Track listing ==
All songs written by Bob Schneider.

No.	Title	Length
1.	"Tumblin" Dice"	2:14
2.	"Candyman"	5:02
3.	"Sunkist"	2:21
4.	"Things My Head Heard"	3:29
5.	"Montana"	3:15
6.	"Corn Flakes and Sodium Penethol"	5:10
7.	"Good Luck"	3:52
8.	"Napoleon's Palace"	6:09
9.	"Funky Weather"	2:36
10.	"Ooey Gooey Chocolate"	2:12
11.	"Blood"	2:19
12.	"Brand New Life"	4:39
