= Mix It Up (disambiguation) =

Mix It Up is a 2004 album by Jump5, or the title song.

Mix It Up may also refer to:

- Mix It Up, a reality television lifestyle show by Coquette Productions
- Mix It Up, a 2015 album by Minoti Vaishnav

== Songs ==
- "Mix It Up", a 1965 single by Allison Durbin
- "Mix It Up", a 1968 single by The Kingstonians
- "Mix It Up", a 1991 single by Dan Reed Network
- "Mix It Up", a song by 311 from Uplifter
- "Mix It Up", a song by The Marvelettes from Playboy
- "Mix It Up", a song by Big Hawk Lil' Keke Wreckin' 2004
- "Mix It Up", a song by Bob Schneider from The Californian

== See also ==
- Mixin' It Up, a 1980 album by The Trammps
- Mix Up (disambiguation)
