= Christmastime (Bob Schneider EP) =

EP by Bob Schneider
- Released: November 24, 2009
- Genre: Christmas
- Label: Shockorama

Bob Schneider chronology
Lovely Creatures (2009)	Christmastime (2009)

Professional ratings
Review scores
Source	Rating
Popdose.Com	(not rated)

Christmastime is a Christmas-themed EP extended play by American rock musician Bob Schneider, originally released on November 24, 2009. It was converted to a full-length album and rereleased December 1, 2017 with three additional tracks ("Jingle Bells", "As Happy As We Can Be", and "Silent Night") and a vinyl pressing.

== Track listing ==
1. "Winter Wonderland" – 2:41
2. "Jingle Bells" – 4:22
3. "I'll Be Home for Christmas" – 2:48
4. "Christmas Time is Here" – 4:01
5. "The Most Wonderful Day of the Year" – 3:51
6. "As Happy As We Can Be" – 3:31
7. "Christmas (Baby Please Come Home)" – 2:59
8. "White Christmas" – 2:47
9. "Silent Night" – 3:12
10. "Fairytale of New York" – 3:28
11. "Have Yourself a Merry Little Christmas" – 4:04
