= King Kong Vol. 1 =

EP by Bob Schneider
- Released: February 10, 2015
- Genre: Americana
- Length: 20:24
- Label: Shockorama Music Publishing
- Producer: Dwight A. Baker

Bob Schneider chronology
Burden of Proof (2013)	King Kong Vol. 1 (2015)

King Kong Vol. 1 is an EP by American rock music artist Bob Schneider, released on February 10, 2015.

== Track listing ==
1. "Dirty Feeling" – 4:02
2. ”King Kong” – 3:46
3. "Magic Wand" – 3:12
4. "Montgomery" – 5:03
5. "The Fools" – 4:21
