= Sad Songs and Waltzes =

Sad Songs and Waltzes may refer to:

- "Sad Songs and Waltzes", a song by Willie Nelson from his 1973 album Shotgun Willie
- Sad Songs and Waltzes, a 1982 album by Keith Whitley, posthumously published in 2000; its title track is a cover of the Willie Nelson song

== See also ==
- Fashion Nugget, a 1996 album by Cake, featuring a cover of the Willie Nelson song
- Rarities, B-Sides and Slow, Sad Waltzes, a 1999 album by Cowboy Junkies
