= Mix Up =

Mix Up may refer to:

- Mix Up (radio show), an Australian dance music program
- Mix-Up, a 1979 album by Cabaret Voltaire
- The Mix-Up, a 2007 album by the Beastie Boys
- Mix Up, a 1984 album by Annie Whitehead
- Mix-Up, a 1990 album by Patrick O'Hearn
- "Mix Up", a song by The Gladiators from Trenchtown Mix Up, 1976
- "Mix Up", a song by Bunny Wailer from Hall of Fame: A Tribute to Bob Marley's 50th Anniversary, 1995

== See also ==
- Mixed Up (disambiguation)
- Mix It Up (disambiguation)
