= El Rey Theatre (Los Angeles) =

Los Angeles Historic-Cultural Monument

- El Rey Theatre
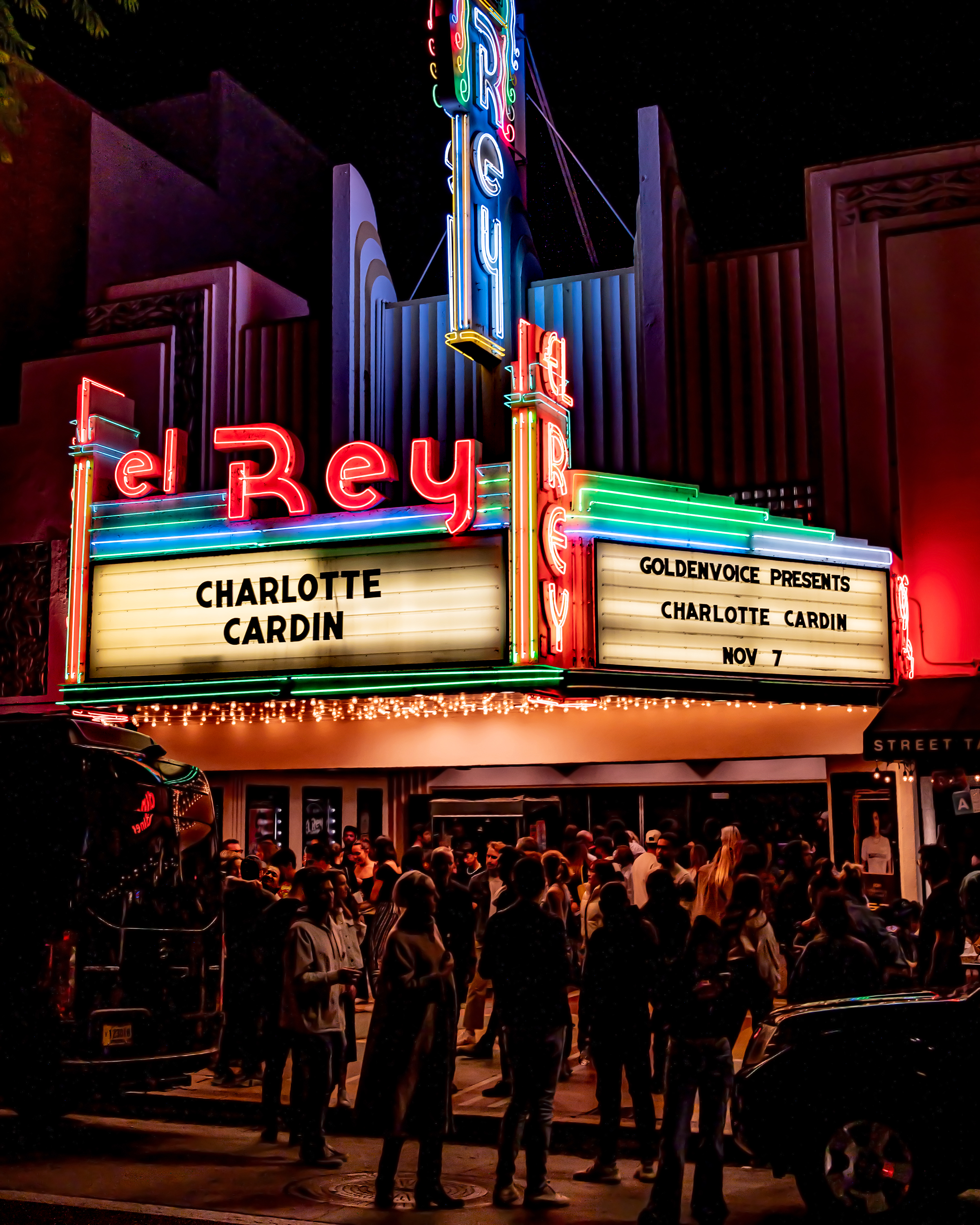
- The marquee of El Rey Theatre, 2023
- Interactive map of El Rey Theatre
- Location: 5515 Wilshire Blvd., Los Angeles, California
- Coordinates: 34°3′45″N 118°20′56″W
- Owner: AEG Live
- Capacity: 771
- Type: Theatre
- Events: Pop, rock, jazz, crossover

Construction
- Built: 1936
- Opened: 1936

Website
- www.theelrey.com

Los Angeles Historic-Cultural Monument
- Designated: February 26, 1991
- Reference no.: 520

The El Rey Theatre is a live music venue in the Miracle Mile area of the Mid-Wilshire region in Los Angeles, California.

This art deco building was designed by Clifford A. Balch (who designed over twenty classic art deco movie theatres around Southern California). Much of the theatre, including the lobby, still retains its art deco roots, and is admired for its Zigzag and Streamline Moderne design.

== History ==
El Rey was built in 1936 as a single-screen movie theatre and functioned as a cinema for nearly 50 years.

From the 1980s to the early 1990s, El Rey Theatre was a dance-music club called Wall Street, but since 1994 this theatre has been a live music venue which is now exclusively booked through Goldenvoice. The capacity is for 771 audience members and it also has a balcony for the VIPs at the back.

The theatre was designated as Los Angeles Historic-Cultural Monument No. 520 on February 26, 1991.

In 1995, it was featured as the main setting of the music video for the Cowboy Junkies' song "Angel Mine" from the Lay It Down album, featuring Janeane Garofalo.

The exterior of the theatre can be seen in the 1984 film Night of the Comet and serves as the location where main character Regina (played by Catherine Mary Stewart) works.

The theatre's exterior is a central plot point of the link segments of the 1986 horror compilation film Zombiethon.

In January 2008, comedy rock band The Aquabats shot part of the pilot for their television series The Aquabats! Super Show! in the theater as part of an exclusive partial concert for members of the band's fan club.

== Notes ==
- Theatres designed by Clifford A. Balch
