= Revival (Judah & the Lion album) =

Studio album by Judah & the Lion
- Released: June 10, 2022
- Genre: Alternative rock
- Length: 42:32
- Label: Cletus the Van Records, Virgin Music

Judah & the Lion chronology
Pep Talks (Live) (2020)	Revival (2022)	The Process (2024)

Professional ratings
Review scores
Source	Rating
Alt Revue	4.9/5 stars
American Songwriter	4/5 stars
One Spin Music	2.5/5 stars

Revival is the fourth studio album by American folk and rock band Judah & the Lion, released on June 10, 2022, through Cletus the Van Records & Virgin Music.

== Background ==
Following time apart during the COVID-19 pandemic and the departure of founding band member and banjo player Nate Zuercher, Judah & the Lion released Revival in 2022.

== Promotion ==
The band announced the "Happy Again Tour" on April 22, 2022. The tour visited 26 US cities in September and October 2022, and a second leg of the tour was announced on December 6, 2022. The second leg of the "Happy Again Tour" made 19 stops in US cities, in March and April 2023.

== Track listing ==
All tracks are written by Brian MacDonald, Judah Akers except where noted.

Standard edition
No.	Title	Length
1.	"Open Your Eyes"	4:40
2.	"Take A Walk"	3:46
3.	"scream!"	3:19
4.	"HAPPY LIFE"	3:57
5.	"Blue Eyes"	6:13
6.	"Landslide" (written by Stevie Nicks)	4:11
7.	"make me a kid again"	0:50
8.	"Revival"	4:29
9.	"Find Another Reason Why"	3:19
10.	"Be Here Now"	4:25
11.	"Things Are Looking Up"	3:17
Total length:		42:32
