= Miles from Our Home =

Studio album by Cowboy Junkies
- Released: June 30, 1998
- Recorded: January 1997 – January 1998
- Genre: Alternative country
- Length: 48:09
- Label: Geffen
- Producer: John Leckie

Cowboy Junkies chronology
Studio: Selected Studio Recordings 1986–1995 (1996)	Miles from Our Home (1998)	Rarities, B-Sides and Slow, Sad Waltzes (1999)

Professional ratings
Review scores
Source	Rating
AllMusic	3/5 stars
Encyclopedia of Popular Music	3/5 stars
Music Box	4/5 stars

Miles from Our Home is the seventh studio album by Canadian alt-country band Cowboy Junkies, which was released in 1998. It was their second and final album for Geffen Records. The title track was a significant hit in their native Canada. Following this album, the Junkies were dropped from the Geffen record label. The Junkies moved to an independent label, Latent Recordings, for their subsequent albums.

== Album development ==
Prior to writing new material, Michael Timmins spent a month collecting various segments of lyrical and musical ideas that were accumulated over the past year. At the start of the intended writing process, The Cowboy Junkies heard the news that Townes Van Zandt had died. Van Zandt was perhaps the biggest influence as a songwriter on Michael, showcasing songs that were peep-holes into the soul. Michael wrote the first draft of "Blue Guitar" the day that he heard Van Zandt died, "as a tribute to the man who had the bluest guitar that I had ever heard." However, the song wasn't finished at the time, and was put away for a while. The following month, Michael came into possession of some of Van Zandt's unpublished and unfinished lyrics, including one titled "Screams from the Kitchen" which had lyrics that just popped out. With permission from Van Zandt's widow, Jeanene Van Zandt, he incorporated the lyrics into the song "Blue Guitar" which managed to finish off the song, completing the tribute to Van Zandt, and becoming Michael Timmins favorite on the album.

The Cowboy Junkies wanted to repeat the process of writing and creating that they used for Lay It Down. Michael Timmins found a house near a gristmill on a pond, a couple hours from Toronto called Maiden's Mill. Michael spent six months at the house writing the songs, and during that period, Margo and Peter Timmins and Alan Anton would come down at times to work on a few songs, then let Michael write some more, and then revisit and create some more, until the Junkies were ready to record. The bands plan for the album was to develop the songs minimally at this point, and to use a studio and a good producer to help finish up the work. They searched out a producer, and selected John Leckie who impressed the band with his love of music and his resume of other bands he had worked with. Leckie came over from England and joined the band at Maiden's Mill and spent a few days listening to the songs the band had assembled. Leckie found a recording studio in Toronto called McClear that he liked for its large room and for being well-equipped. In September 1997, the basic tracks were recorded, along with guitar overdubs, and the vocals. Michael Timmins managed to record seven or eight overdubs for the title track, which was his career high for overdubs. Leckie recommended Vince Jones of The Grapes of Wrath for the keyboard work, and he flew in from Vancouver to add piano and organ work for ten tracks in one day. Some of the overdub work was done at another Toronto studio, Chemical, which eventually became one of the Cowboy Junkies favorite studios. When the recording was complete, Leckie took the tracks to London to mix the tracks at Abbey Road. Leckie and the Junkies mixed for three weeks in Studio One, and recorded strings in Studio Two. During this period, the band were constantly reminded of the Beatles previous occupancy of the studios, and somewhat awed by it. At one point, the band ran into Robert Plant and Jimmy Page in the basement cafeteria and shared a brief greeting. Craig Leon wrote out the string arrangements, and Gavyn Wright and a small string orchestra created the music, all the while overseen in a small control room which was crowded with the band, Leckie, two engineers, an agent, and a writer, which added up to a very expensive three hours of a recording session. After a few weeks of mixing, the Cowboy Junkies returned to Canada with a CD. However, after taking a break from all music for a period, the band decided a few of the mixes could be different, so they had Michael Timmins sit with Chris Lord-Alge (Mr. Mixer) at his Los Angeles studio and re-mix several of the tracks for a few days.

The theme for Miles from Our Home is 'why?' The tracks deal with the repercussions of the question differently, such as "Someone Out There" which deals with anger, "New Dawn Coming" with hope, "Miles from Our Home" with dignity, and "Darkling Day" which supplies some answers.

== Track listing ==
All tracks are written by Michael Timmins except where noted

No.	Title	Writer(s)	Length
1.	"New Dawn Coming"		4:12
2.	"Blue Guitar"	Michael Timmins, Townes Van Zandt	6:09
3.	"Miles from Our Home"	Michael Timmins, Greg Clarke, Brodie Lodge	4:35
4.	"Good Friday"		4:02
5.	"Darkling Days"	Michael Timmins, Clarke	4:21
6.	"Hollow as a Bone"		3:26
7.	"Someone Out There"	Michael Timmins, Clarke	3:00
8.	"The Summer of Discontent"	Michael Timmins, Clarke, Lodge	4:35
9.	"No Birds Today"		4:19
10.	"Those Final Feet" (CD shows track 10 as 9:30, hides track 11)		4:58
11.	"At the End of the Rainbow" (hidden track, after 35 seconds of silence)		3:57
Total length:			48:09

== Personnel ==
Cowboy Junkies

- Margo Timmins – vocals
- Michael Timmins – guitar
- Alan Anton – bass
- Peter Timmins – drums

Additional Musicians

- Jeff Bird – harmonica
- David Houghton – percussion
- Vince Jones – organ, piano, harmonium
- Lewis Melville – pedal steel guitar
- Greg Clarke – ambient guitars (track 5)
- Craig Leon – string arrangements
- Gavyn Wright – orchestra leader

Production

- John Leckie – producer, engineer, mixing
- Greg Calbi – mastered
- Peter Moore – sequencing
- Chris Lord-Alge – mixed by (tracks 1 – 3, 5 – 8 & 10)
- Robert Cobban – additional engineering at Studio 306
- John Biodich, Mike Dy, Darryl Smith, Guy Massey – assistant engineers
- Chris Brown – string session engineer
- Russell Monk, Douglas Walker – photography
- Open Circle Design – design
- David Houghton – Art Direction
