= Driving Wheel (David Wiffen song) =

Song by David Wiffen, popularized by Tom Rush

"Driving Wheel", sometimes recorded as "Lost My Driving Wheel", is a song written by British-born Canadian folk singer David Wiffen. The song was popularized by Tom Rush, and has been performed and recorded by many well-known musicians.

== History ==
Wiffen included "Driving Wheel" on his 1971 self-titled album which was released on Fantasy Records. The album received spotty promotion, and the song was not widely known until it appeared on Tom Rush's self-titled album in 1970. Soon after it was recorded by Whitney Sunday.

"Driving Wheel" was included on Roger McGuinn's self-titled 1973 album, released by Columbia Records. It was also recorded by the Cowboy Junkies, originally for the 1993 charity compilation album Born to Choose, later appearing in a live performance on their 1995 concert album 200 More Miles: Live Performances 1985–1994, and in the original studio rendition on their 1999 rarities compilation Rarities, B-Sides and Slow, Sad Waltzes.

In 2000, "Driving Wheel" was included as a bonus track on the CD reissue of the Byrd's eleventh album Father Along.

In 2007 Chris and Rich Robinson of The Black Crowes included the song on their live album Brothers of a Feather: Live at the Roxy. Chris included yet another rendition of it on his Chris Robinson Brotherhood live album Betty's Blends Volume Two in 2015.

Years later, in 2013, Americana singer David Bromberg included the song on his album Only Slightly Mad. Many musicians also continue to include the song in their live sets.
