= Mixed Up =

Mixed Up may refer to:

- Mixed Up (film), a 1984 Hong Kong film
- Mixed Up (The Cure album), 1990
- Mixed Up (Praga Khan album), 2001
- Mixed Up (I've Sound album), 2004

== See also ==
- Mix Up (disambiguation)
