= The Californian (Bob Schneider album) =

Studio album by Bob Schneider
- Released: August 8, 2006
- Studio: Texas Treefort Studios, Austin, Texas
- Genre: Rock
- Length: 40:43
- Label: Shockorama
- Producer: Bob Schneider

Bob Schneider chronology
I'm Good Now (2001)	The Californian (2006)	When the Sun Breaks Down on the Moon (2007)

The Californian is the 5th solo studio album (and 7th released project) from Bob Schneider, released on August 8, 2006.

Originally planned as a double-disc set, The Californian was produced, in part, as the culmination of Schneider’s collaborations with rock guitarist Billy Harvey, who had been touring as a part of the band.

The album was recorded in four days.

== Track listing ==
1. "Holding in the World" – 5:03
2. "Game Plan" – 2:30
3. "Party At the Neighbors" – 2:09
4. "Miss Oblivion" – 2:27
5. "Flowerparts" – 4:22
6. "Blauu" – 2:03
7. "Get Up On It" – 2:29
8. "Mix It Up" – 2:21
9. "Superpowers" – 2:28
10. "Everything I Have Means Nothing to Me Now" – 3:26
11. "Boombox" – 1:38
12. "The Californian" – 3:54
13. "Mudhouse" – 3:37
14. "The Sons of Ralph" – 2:16

== Disc 2 ==
While never formally released, The Californian Disc 2 was intended to be a “live” album of songs with a raw feel, and was recorded in studio, with an audience track to be mixed in later. Schneider eventually made most of these tracks available (sans audience track) as a reward for backers of his album King Kong, through PledgeMusic.

Tracks included "Assknocker", "Hillbilly Elephant", "Still Life", "Trouble Down The Line", "Run Away With The Sun", "Murder", "C'mon Baby", "New Warrior", "Hell Yeah", "A Sweet Sound", "June", "Long Way Down", "Ventilation" and "Wicked Little Man".
