= Born to Choose =

Compilation album by various artists
- Released: 1993
- Length: 48:01
- Label: Rykodisc

Professional ratings
Review scores
Source	Rating
AllMusic	3/5 stars
Robert Christgau	A−

Born to Choose is a compilation album, released in 1993 on Rykodisc. It was released as a benefit album, with proceeds going to support NARAL, the Brooklyn Women's Anti-Rape Exchange, and Women's Health Action and Mobilization.

== Track listing ==
1. R.E.M. with Natalie Merchant, "Photograph" (Natalie Merchant, Michael Stipe, Mike Mills, Peter Buck, Bill Berry)
2. Matthew Sweet, "She Said She Said" [Live] (Lennon–McCartney)
3. Sugar, "Running Out of Time" [Live]
4. Mekons, "Born to Choose"
5. John Trudell, "Rant 'n Roll"
6. Tom Waits, "Filipino Box Spring Hog"
7. Lucinda Williams,"Pancakes"
8. Pavement, "Greenlander"
9. NRBQ, "Don't Talk About My Music"
10. Cowboy Junkies, "Lost My Driving Wheel" (Wiffen)
11. Soundgarden, "HIV Baby"
12. Helmet, "Distracted" [Live]
