= Take It All Back =

Single by Judah & the Lion

from the album Folk Hop N' Roll
- Released: August 9, 2016
- Recorded: 2016
- Genre: Hip hop, bluegrass, folk
- Length: 4:14; 3:38 (radio edit)
- Label: Cletus the Van
- Songwriter(s): Judah Akers; Brian Macdonald; Timothy Vita; Nate Zuercher; Spencer Cross
- Producer(s): Dave Cobb

Judah & the Lion singles chronology
"Insane" (2016)	"Take It All Back" (2016)	"Suit & Jacket" (2017)

Music video
- "Take It All Back" on YouTube

"Take It All Back" is a song written and recorded by American folk band Judah & the Lion, released as a single from their second studio album Folk Hop N' Roll. It was released by the band's label, Cletus the Van Records.

== Music video ==
The first music video for the song was released on July 28, 2016. A second music video was uploaded on the band's VEVO channel on January 17, 2017.

== Chart performance ==
"Take It All Back" was the band's first entry on the Alternative Songs chart in the United States, reaching number one.

=== Charts ===
Chart (2016–17)	Peak position
Canada Rock (Billboard)	10
US Bubbling Under Hot 100 (Billboard)	19
US Adult Pop Airplay (Billboard)	14
US Hot Rock & Alternative Songs (Billboard)	6
US Rock & Alternative Airplay (Billboard)	4

=== Year-end charts ===
Chart (2016)	Position
US Hot Rock Songs (Billboard)	83
US Rock Airplay (Billboard)	48
Chart (2017)	Position
US Adult Top 40 (Billboard)	49
US Hot Rock Songs (Billboard)	15
US Rock Airplay (Billboard)	12

== Certifications ==
Region	Certification	Certified units/sales
United States (RIAA)	Platinum	1,000,000^{‡}
^{‡} Sales+streaming figures based on certification alone.
