= Bob Schneider =

American musician (born 1965)

- Born: Robert Schneider; October 12, 1965 (age 61); Ypsilanti, Michigan, U.S.
- Genres: Pop, rock, folk, country
- Occupation: Musician
- Years active: 1990s–present
- Labels: Shockorama, Universal, Vanguard, Kirtland
- Website: www.bobschneider.com

Robert Schneider (born October 12, 1965) is an American musician based in Austin, Texas. He is the former lead singer of the rock band Ugly Americans. He has recorded and officially released over 20 studio albums and EPs, many on his own Shockorama Records label. He also regularly releases additional demos, live recordings, and other projects through various platforms. His first major record Lonelyland (2001) was licensed through Universal Records, which, along with a subsequent distribution deal through Vanguard Records, made his early releases widely available.

Schneider's primary musical style centers on an acoustic singer-songwriter presentation, with experimentations in electronic sounds, rock, and other cross-genre combinations. He is known to perform live as both a solo act, and also with various musical groups, including his own Lonelyland and Texas Bluegrass Massacre bands, and has developed a reputation for improvisation and audience involvement. He continues to have a long-standing Monday night residency at the Saxon Pub in Austin.

He is married to Laura Moore-Schneider, with whom he has a daughter, Scarlet. He has a son, Luc, from his previous marriage.

== Early life ==
Schneider was born to Robert Sr. and Katie Schneider (an opera singer/musician and teacher respectively) in Ypsilanti, Michigan. He was raised with his sister in El Paso, Texas, as well as Munich, Germany, where he moved with his family at the age of 2 so his father could receive vocal training. Schneider later recalled the experience as a marginal existence, stating that his parents "had this big plan, but my dad just didn’t have the voice". He learned guitar and piano at an early age, and often performed at his parents' parties.

Before turning to a solo career, Schneider spent years performing in various bands, often as the loud and energetic front-man. He dropped out of the University of Texas at El Paso, where he studied art while also performing in his first major band, a local funk-rock outfit called Joe Rockhead. The band independently released three albums before disbanding. Schneider subsequently performed with the Ugly Americans, sometimes as an opening act for the Dave Matthews Band, and signed with the revived Capricorn Records. In 1997, Schneider co-founded The Scabs, a funk ensemble that regularly played local Austin venues, and was described as "inspired by The Rugburns (right down to the suits and ties) [with] bawdy show tunes and puerile blues".

Schneider briefly dated actress Sandra Bullock between the years 1999 and 2001. While the relationship did not last, his songs have continued to appear in films from throughout the actress's career.

== Solo career ==
In 1999 Schneider was convinced to record and release Songs Sung & Played on Guitar at the Same Time, a short collection of acoustic songs, which inspired him to officially form his own solo act, initially under the name "Lonelyland". Lonelyland went on to become the title of his first major studio album, which sold over 10,000 copies at Waterloo Records alone, and eventually led to a nationwide re-release after signing with Universal Records in 2001. The track "Big Blue Sea" in particular received significant radio play, and garnered some national attention. He was eventually dropped by Universal, but went on to record I'm Good Now in 2004, which was distributed by Vanguard Records, garnering further national attention and some critical acclaim.

During this time, Schneider began a long-running weekly songwriting game with a rotating group of friends (including names like Jason Mraz, Patty Griffin, and Matt Nathanson), which saw him creating many new songs, sometimes at a rate of one per week or more. His contracts with Universal and Vanguard provided him the freedom to develop "side projects" under his Shockorama label, which allowed him to release many of these creations. Side projects from this period included Underneath The Onion Trees, The Galaxy Kings, and I Have Seen The End of the World and It Looks Like This. These projects initially received limited releases of approximately 10,000 copies each, though Vanguard eventually agreed to re-release some in 2006, to coincide with his next major album The Californian.

Schneider went on to sign with Kirtland Records in 2009, releasing his next major album Lovely Creatures, which featured the single "40 Dogs (Like Romeo and Juliet)", as well as Patty Griffin on the track "Changing Your Mind". It peaked at #14 on the AAA Radio Chart. Schneider released a second album with Kirtland Records in 2011 entitled "A Perfect Day", featuring the single "Let The Light In." 2013's Burden of Proof was his third and final project with the label, before he moved back to Shockorama with 2015's King Kong, the result of a crowdsourcing campaign through PledgeMusic.

Schneider continued to build on his prolific songwriting output during his tenure with Kirtland Records, organizing his ongoing songwriting and demo recordings into collections labeled by year. Many of these recordings were shared through online platforms such as Myspace, SoundCloud, and Snocap, while others were officially released through various side projects.

In 2017, Schneider began formally making his extensive catalog of previously unreleased recordings available to fans through Patreon, with subsequent albums also made available to subscribers as bonus content.. Blood and Bones was officially released on June 8, 2018, followed by In A Roomful Of Blood With A Sleeping Tiger on August 27, 2021. The Human Torch was initially released as a series of individual tracks between December 8 and 31, 2023, before receiving a full album release on May 3, 2024.

Starting in 2025, Schneider officially released several previously unreleased projects from his back catalog. Texas Bluegrass Massacre, originally recorded with the intention of an early 2010s release, saw an official public release on November 18, 2025. This was followed by FAYM, Schneider's long-running rock opera project, which was released on April 14, 2026. Originally developed as a collection of demos in 2009, the released album featured a combination of original demo recordings and reworked or updated material, with one track omitted entirely. Its release followed the 2023 publication of a crowd-funded graphic novel of the same name, illustrated by Justin Barker. The Bullet and the Gun, a fully produced but previously unreleased album recorded from 2008, subsequently received an official release on September 25, 2026.

== Soundtrack contributions ==
- 2000 – "Blue Skies for Everyone" was played during the opening sequence of the movie "Gun Shy," starring Liam Neeson and Sandra Bullock.
- 2000 – "Bullets" was used in the movie "Miss Congeniality," starring Sandra Bullock.
- 2001 – "Bullets" also appeared on the "Jay & Silent Bob Strike Back" soundtrack
- 2002 – "Big Blue Sea" was used in the movie "40 Days and 40 Nights," starring Josh Hartnett
- 2002 – "The World Exploded Into Love" appeared in the movie "Secrets of the Ya-Ya Sisterhood," starring Sandra Bullock
- 2006 – "The World Exploded Into Love" closed out the first episode of the television sitcom "Men in Trees," starring Anne Heche.
- 2009 – "Love Is Everywhere" is featured in the film and soundtrack of the movie "All About Steve," starring Sandra Bullock
- 2009 – "Changing Your Mind" is featured in the indie film "Harmony and Me," where he also has a role as a wedding singer
- 2019 - “Bombanaza” (instrumental version) is featured during the closing credits for the Quentin Tarantino documentary, QT8: The First Eight.
- 2020 - "Wish the Wind Would Blow Me" and "The World Exploded Into Love" are both featured in the film "The Lost Husband," starring Josh Duhamel

== Awards ==
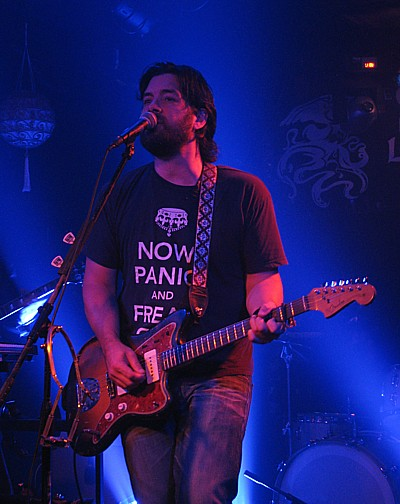
Bob Schneider during live recording session at The Saint, May 2011

Bob Schneider has won 55 Austin Music Awards, to date, for multiple different projects ranging from 1992 to 2017.

=== Austin Music Awards ===
- 1992: Best Funk Band, Joe Rock Head
- 1993: Best New Band, Ugly Americans; Best Funk Band, Ugly Americans
- 1994: Best Funk Band, Ugly Americans
- 1995: Best Funk Band, Ugly Americans
- 1996: Best Pop Band, Ugly Americans; Best Soul/Funk Band, Ugly Americans
- 1998: Best Funk Band, The Scabs; Best None of the Above Band, Bob Schneider and Lonelyland
- 1999: Musician of the Year, Best Male Vocals, Best Songwriter, Band of the Year – The Scabs; Best Alternative/Punk Band, The Scabs; Best Funk Band, The Scabs; Best Concert Poster, Bob Schneider/Joe Rockhead
- 2000: Musician of the Year, Album of the Year, Lonelyland; Best Male Vocals, Best Songwriter, Best Singer-Songwriter, Best Funk Band – The Scabs; Best Concert Poster, Bob Schneider/The Scabs; Best Album Artwork, Lonelyland
- 2001: Musician of the Year, Best Male Vocals, Best Songwriter, Best Singer-Songwriter
- 2003: Musician of the Year
- 2004: Album of the Year, I'm Good Now; Song of the Year, "Cap'n Kirk"
- 2007: Best Bluegrass Band, Bob Schneider and Texas Bluegrass Massacre
- 2008: Band of the Year, Bob Schneider and Lonelyland; Best Male Vocals, Best Bluegrass Band – Bob Schneider and Texas Bluegrass Massacre
- 2009: Musician of the Year, Album of the Year – Lovely Creatures; Song of the Year, "40 Dogs"; Band of the Year, Bob Schneider and Lonelyland; Best Male Vocals, Best Songwriter
- 2010: Best Male Vocals
- 2013: Musician of the Year, Album of the Year – Burden of Proof; Best Songwriter
- 2015: Musician of the Year, Best Songwriter, Best Male Vocals, Album of the Year – King Kong; Song of the Year, "Stars Over Your House"; Best Residency, Bob Schneider's Lonelyland; Best Album Artwork,King Kong; Best Poster, Bob Schneider/King Kong
- 2016: Best Residency, Bob Schneider's Lonelyland; Best Rock Band, Bob Schneider and Lonelyland

== Discography ==
=== Solo albums ===
- Songs Sung and Played on Guitar at the Same Time (1998)
- Lonelyland (2000-Shockorama) & (2001-Universal)
- Underneath the Onion Trees (2000)
- The Galaxy Kings (2002)
- I Have Seen the End of the World and It Looks Like This (2003)
- I'm Good Now (2004)
- The Californian (2006)
- Greatest Hits Live (2006)
- Songs Sung & Played at the Same Time with People in the Room (2007)
- When the Sun Breaks Down on the Moon (2007)
- Love Is Everywhere (2009 EP)
- Lovely Creatures (2009)
- Live At The Paramount Theatre (2009)
- Christmastime (2009)
- A Perfect Day (2011)
- Burden of Proof (2013)
- King Kong (2015)
- I Will Find You No Matter What: The Songs of Luc & Bob Schneider (2016) (Released as "The L")
- Blood and Bones (2018)
- In A Roomful Of Blood With A Sleeping Tiger (2021)
- The Human Torch (2023)
- Texas Bluegrass Massacre (2025)
- FAYM (2026)
- The Bullet And The Gun (2026)
- Bob Schneider and the Moonlight Trio (Live) (2026)

=== The Scabs ===
- Freebird (1998)
- Bombtracks (1998)
- More Than a Feeling (1999)
- Destroyer (2000)

=== Ugly Americans ===
- Ugly Americans (1993)
- Ugly Americans (Live) (1994)
- Stereophonic Spanish Fly (1996)
- Boom Boom Baby (1998)

=== Joe Rockhead ===
- Party Till You're Dead (1990)
- Crazy (1992)
- No Going Back (1993)

== Unreleased projects ==
Schneider has many unpublished musical projects that, while never officially released, have been made available to fans (either partially or in full) via Patreon and similar platforms. Many more unlisted projects and older demos are simply uncategorized, or grouped under a legacy "Anthology" label.

=== Known albums ===
- Uncocked (1996)
- The Cassette Demos (1998)
- Downloads Vol. 1 (2004)
- The Californian - Disc 2 (2006)
- The Electric Monkey (2007)
- The Ever Increasing Need To Succeed (2010)
- Supershit (2012)

=== Yearly demo collections ===
- FAYMF (2007)
- Supershit (2009)
- Here’s The Deal (2012)
- Copy That Dude (2013)
- Mental Problems (2014)
- Into The Great Unknown (2015)
- Practical Guide To Everything (2016)
- Brave New World (2017)
- Outside The Bocks (2018)
- Facing The Sun (2019)
- Bricks (2020)
- Everything Is Super Easy (2021)
- Breaking The Legs Of Despair (2022)
- Diamonds (2023)
- Souvenirs From The Storm (2024)
- Mr. Control (2025)
- whatever (2026)

== Live recordings ==
Since the 2000s, Schneider has recorded almost all of his live performances, making the recordings available for purchase as show souvenirs (which he labels "Frunk") for the audience. Originally available only as physical double-disc CD sets, Schneider began to phase out physical media around 2010 in favor of USB drives and digital online purchasing. While the majority of recordings prior to 2012 are no longer available, the current archive is maintained on his Bandcamp.

== Books ==
- Lonelyland Comic #3. Shockorama Books. 2026
- Lonelyland Comic #2. Shockorama Books. 2026
- Lonelyland Comic #1. Shockorama Books. 2026
- Collected Poems. Shockorama Books. 2025
- Song Bible. Shockorama Books. 2025
- The Lunatic Asylum. Shockorama Books. 2023.
- FAYM (Graphic Novel). 2023.
- Falling Into A Living Room. Shockorama Books. 2023.
- The Poetry Machine Vol. 3. Shockorama Books. 2023.
- The Poetry Machine Vol. 2. Shockorama Books. 2022.
- The Poetry Machine Vol. 1. Shockorama Books. 2020.
- Nightingales. Shockorama Books. 2020.
- Father Of A Rockstar. Shockorama Books. 2016.
- Translations. Shockorama Books. 2015.
- We Invented Love Somehow And Without Mercy Or Instruction. 2013.
- Selected Poems. 2013.
- The Wild Melancholy. Shockorama Books. 2009.
- I Have Seen the End of the World and It Looks Like This. Shockorama Books. 2003.

== See also ==
- Music of Austin
