= Eric Hutchinson =

American musician (born 1980)

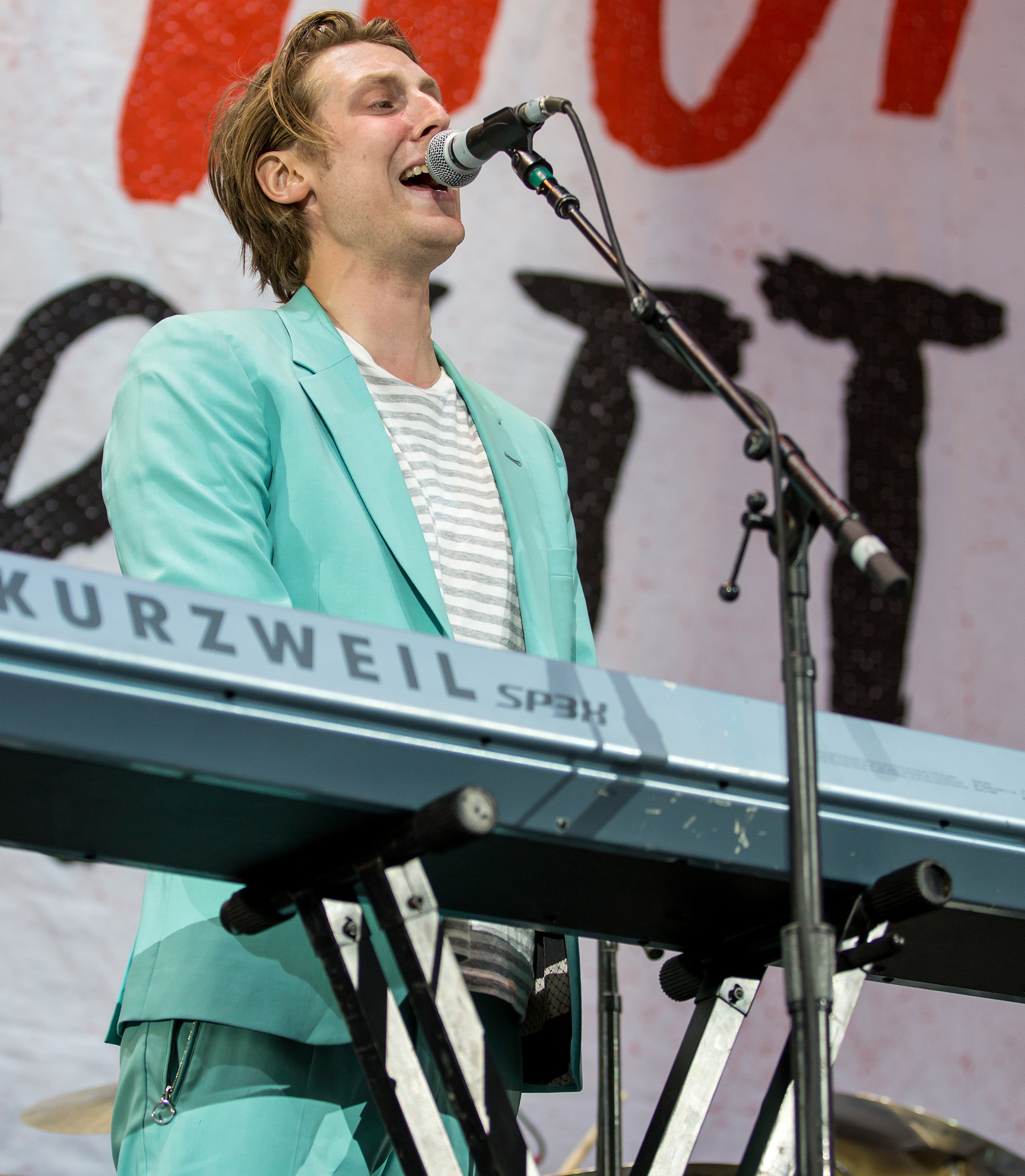
- Hutchinson performing at the Piece by Piece Tour in 2015

Background information
- Born: September 8, 1980 (age 45)
- Origin: Takoma Park, Maryland, U.S.
- Genres: Pop, pop rock, rock, folk, power pop
- Occupations: Singer-songwriter, guitarist
- Instruments: Singing, guitar, piano
- Years active: 2003–present
- Labels: Let's Break Records, Warner Bros. Kobalt
- Website: www.erichutchinson.com/

Eric Hutchinson (born September 8, 1980) is an American singer-songwriter best known for his songs "Rock & Roll", "OK, It's Alright with Me", "Not There Yet", "Watching You Watch Him", and "Tell the World". Hutchinson was named an AOL "About to Pop" artist, Yahoo! Who's Next Artist, MSN "One to Watch" Artist and a "VH1 You Oughta Know" Artist. Hutchinson also wrote and performed the theme song for ESPN's Fantasy Focus podcast.

Hutchinson tours extensively and has performed at venues across the U.S., Canada, Australia, New Zealand, Norway, England, and Dubai. He has toured with such artists as Kelly Clarkson, Jason Mraz, OneRepublic, O.A.R., Pentatonix, Hanson, Tristan Prettyman, John Mulaney and G. Love & Special Sauce.

Hutchinson is also known for the sharp, often colorful suits he wears on stage and on his album covers.

== Biography ==
=== Early life ===
Hutchinson grew up in Takoma Park, Maryland, the son of Royal Hutchinson (1945–2019), who was of Scottish ancestry, and Jean Hutchinson (née Engel), who is of German ancestry. He graduated from Montgomery Blair High School and then attending Emerson College in Boston.

=== 2005–2007: Sounds Like This ===
In 2005, Hutchinson signed with Madonna's Maverick Records, but the label shut down before his album was released. He independently recorded and released the album Sounds Like This in 2007. The album won praise from gossip blogger Perez Hilton, which sent it to the top ten on the iTunes Store, where it peaked at number five in September 2007 and debuted at No. 1 on the Billboard Heatseekers chart. It became the highest-charting album by an unsigned artist in iTunes history.

The album was picked up by Warner Bros. Records, who released it in May 2008. Hutchinson's 2008 single "Rock & Roll" earned him his first gold record in the United States. "Rock and Roll" also appeared in the series finale episode of the Australian-produced Packed to the Rafters. The single reached No. 1 in Australia in April 2009. In addition, "Rock and Roll" reached No. 9 on the ARIA Australian Singles Chart and has been certified Platinum in Australia. "Rock and Roll" has also reached Gold in New Zealand, the U.S. and Norway.

=== 2012: Moving Up, Living Down ===
Moving Up, Living Down, Hutchinson's second album, was released on April 17, 2012, by Warner Bros. Records. The first single, "Watching You Watch Him" debuted on the season premiere of Grey's Anatomy. Hutchinson also returned to the Late Show with David Letterman on February 21, 2012, to perform "Watching You Watch Him". Hutchinson wrote "Watching You Watch Him" as a joke about his wife, Jill's obsession with tennis star Roger Federer.

Allmusic.com's review said of the album said: "Hutchinson is a bell tone of a crooner with a knack for writing a catchy hook, and imbues his songs with just enough positive swagger and rhythmic grit to bring to mind a kind of contemporary take on Hall & Oates."

=== 2014: Pure Fiction ===
Hutchinson released his third album titled Pure Fiction on April 8, 2014, via Kobalt Label Services. The first song on the album, "Tell the World", was chosen as the theme song for the 2014 mid-season NBC sitcom Growing Up Fisher, and also the song for the first Microsoft Windows 10 commercial.

Allmusic.com's review of the album said: "Pure Fiction, finds him delivering more of his passionate, melodic, and imminently likable songs. Ultimately, the truth of Pure Fiction is that Hutchinson remains an impressive, resonant-voiced singer and a vibrant conduit for catchy, radio-ready pop."

=== 2015: Easy Street ===
Eric's album, Easy Street, released on August 26, 2016. The album is produced by Hutchinson himself and features the power ballad "Anyone Who Knows Me", which Eric has said is "the song I've been trying to write my whole career."

=== 2018: Modern Happiness ===
Modern Happiness was released in its entirety October 5, 2018. This was the first album to be released under the name Eric Hutchinson and the Believers with songwriting credits belonging to him and his band. In late 2017, Hutchinson announced that he would release one song per month starting in January 2018 to members of his Patreon only, eventually leading to the album's full release.

=== 2019: Before & After Life ===
Before & After Life was released one track at a time to members of Patreon. The album includes multiple tracks written for and about his wife Jill and their daughter Zelda, plus several tracks about the death of his mother-in-law. The full album was released on February 14, 2019.

=== 2020: Class of 98 ===
Hutchinson's next album, Class of 98 was originally scheduled for release April 17, but was delayed until June 12 due to the 2020 Coronavirus Outbreak. It was then further delayed in the wake of the George Floyd protests. On September 11, he released a deluxe edition of the album, which included most of the tracks' acoustic versions.

=== 2022: Sing Along! ===
Hutchinson's six-track album Sing Along! was inspired by 1960s-era protest songs in the folk and gospel genres, featuring more political and social messages than much of his previous work. The album was released on August 5, 2022.

== Touring ==
In the winter of 2015, Hutchinson embarked on his "Almost Solo" tour. In the spring of 2016, Hutchinson joined Rachel Platten on her "Wildfire Tour" in many cities.

Hutchinson's regular touring band, The Believers, consists of Elliott Blaufuss (Guitars, Keys & Vocals), Ian Allison (Bass & Vocals) and Bryan Taylor (Drums, Percussion & Vocals). The band also sometimes features Jessie Payo on Backup Vocals. Eric Hutchinson & The Believers are known for a nonstop show that is high energy, funny, and full of soul.

On October 24, 2016, Hutchinson announced that he would be taking an indefinite break from touring after his "Anyone Who Knows Me" tour. The tour ended at the 9:30 Club in the U Street district of Washington, D.C., on November 2, 2016.

On February 7, 2020, Hutchinson announced the "Class of 98 Tour".

In fall 2023, Hutchinson toured in celebration of the 15th anniversary of his 2008 album Sounds Like This, which he performed in its entirety.

== Reception ==
Emerson College's student-run radio station WERS called him "one of the most talented singer-songwriters that Boston has to offer", and he has been compared to Jason Mraz, Stevie Wonder, Cat Stevens, Billy Joel and The Beatles. Journalist James Campion calls Hutchinson "a major talent with nary a trace of pretension" and "a sure thing."

Hutchinson's music is a combination of rock, folk pop, and power pop. It has been called "intelligent pop" with "painstakingly placed lyrics, brimming with sarcasm and wit," and "sunshine pop" with "feel-good playfulness" and a "plucky demeanor."

Hutchinson placed second at the 2002 Los Angeles Songwriter's Grand Slam.

== Personal life ==
Hutchinson is married to Jilian Bream, a costume designer. They have a daughter.

== Discography ==
Album	Tracks
That Could've Gone Better: Released: March 25, 2003; Label: Let's Break Records; ASIN: B000CAEI9	1. "Subtitles"; 2. "Rock and Roll"; 3. "Jettison"; 4. "Breakdown More"; 5. "All Used Up"; 6. "Same Mistakes"; 7. "Please"
...Before I Sold Out: Released: March 14, 2006; Label: Let's Break Records; ASIN: B000FTL0A0	1. "Modern Age"; 2. "All Over Now"; 3. "Outside Villanova"; 4. "Breakdown More"; 5. "Don't Hold Back"; 6. "Call Me Back"; 7. "Rock and Roll"
Sounds Like This: Released: May 20, 2008; Label: Let's Break Records / Warner Bros. Records; Songwriting credits: All songs written by Eric Hutchinson	1. "OK, It's Alright with Me"; 2. "You Don't Have to Believe Me"; 3. "Outside Villanova"; 4. "Food Chain"; 5. "Rock and Roll"; 6. "Oh!"; 7. "All Over Now"; 8. "It Hasn't Been Long Enough"; 9. "Back to Where I Was"; 10. "You've Got You"
Moving Up Living Down: Released: April 17, 2012; Label: Let's Break Records / Warner Bros. Records	1. "Talk Is Cheap"; 2. "Best Days"; 3. "The Basement"; 4. "Watching You Watch Him"; 5. "Breakdown More"; 6. "The People I Know"; 7. "Living in the Afterlife"; 8. "In the First Place"; 9. "I'm Not Cool"; 10. "Not There Yet"; 11. "Lisa" [Bonus Track]
Pure Fiction: Released: April 8, 2014; Label: Let's Break Records / Kobalt	1. "Tell the World"; 2. "A Little More"; 3. "Forever"; 4. "I Got the Feelin Now"; 5. "Goodnight Goodbye"; 6. "Love Like You"; 7. "I Don't Love U"; 8. "Sun Goes Down"; 9. "Forget About Joni" (Acoustic); 10. "Shine on Me" (Acoustic); 11. "Tell the World" (Acoustic) [Bonus Track]
Almost Solo in NYC (Live): Released: October 7, 2014; Label: Let's Break Records / Kobalt	1. "OK It's Alright with Me" – Live; 2. "I'm a Foot Stomper" – Live; 3. "Watching You Watch Him" – Live; 4. "Watching You Eat Shrimp" – Live; 5. "Every Little Thing She Does Is Magic" – Live; 6. "Emo in College" – Live; 7. "Breakdown More" – Live; 8. "Outside Villanova" – Live; 9. "Amsterdam" – Live; 10. "Shine on Me" – Live; 11. "Rock & Roll" – Live; 12. "Love Like You" – Live; 13. "A Little More" – Live
Easy Street: Released: August 26, 2016; Label: Let's Break Records / Kobalt	1. "Dear Me"; 2. "Good Rhythm (feat. G. Love)"; 3. "Anyone Who Knows Me"; 4. "Lost in Paradise"; 5. "Alcatraz"; 6. "American Princess"; 7. "Bored to Death"; 8. "Same Old Thing"; 9. "Anyone Who Knows Me (feat. Kevin 'K.O' Olusola)"; 10. "Dear Me (feat. Kevin 'K.O' Olusola)"
Modern Happiness: Released: October 5, 2018; Label: Let's Break Records / Kobalt	1. "Miracle Worker"; 2. "New Religion"; 3. "I’ll Always Be the One Who Makes You Cry"; 4. "Happy Like a Chicken With His Head Cut Off"; 5. "Hands"; 6. "Can’t Stop What’s Coming"; 7. "She Could Be the One"; 8. "Take It Easy On Me"; 9. "For the First Time"; 10. "A Million Bucks On a Queen Motel Bed"
Before & After Life: Released: February 14, 2019; Label: Self-Release	1. "The Best Part"; 2. "Ultrasound"; 3. "I Hope She's Just Like You"; 4. "Why I Love Your Mom"; 5. "Right Where I'm Supposed to Be"; 6. "Born in the Dark"; 7. "Life After Life"; 8. "Hell or Something Like It"; 9. "Postcards from the Other Side"
Class of 98 - Deluxe & Unplugged: Released: September 11, 2020; Label: Let's Break Records; ASIN: LBR500LP	1. "Rock Out Tonight"; 2. "Cooler than You"; 3. "My Old Man"; 4. "Ann Marie"; 5. "Good Things Come"; 6. "Sweet Little Baby Rock N Roller"; 7. "If They Don't Care (Then We Don't Either)"; 8. "Drunk at Lunch"; 9. "Lovely Lori"; 10. "Whether I Like It or Not"; 11. "Never Ever Over You - Unplugged"; 12. "Cooler than You - Unplugged"; 13. "Ann Marie - Unplugged"; 14. "Rock Out Tonight - Unplugged"; 15. "Good Things Come - Unplugged"; 16. "Lovely Lori - Unplugged"; 17. "Drunk at Lunch - Unplugged"; 18. "My Old Man - Unplugged"; 19. "Sweet Little Baby Rock N Roller - Unplugged"
Sing Along! with Eric Hutchinson: Released: August 5, 2022; Label: Let's Break Records; ASIN: B09Z7BLQGX	1. "Everybody’s Gotta Beating Heart"; 2. "Hey Look I Found It! (My Inner Peace)"; 3. "Right Side of History"; 4. "The Littlest Candle"; 5. "Pick Up The Pace"; 6. "Sing Along With Me"

== Other ventures ==
Hutchinson is the creator of "Songversations", a music listening card game released by Abrams Books in 2017.
