= Saxon Pub =

Music venue in Austin, Texas

- Interactive map of Saxon Pub
- Address: 1320 S. Lamar Blvd. Austin, Texas
- Coordinates: 30°15′13″N 97°45′49″W
- Seating type: 150

Construction
- Opened: 1990

Website
- thesaxonpub.com

Saxon Pub is a music venue in Austin, Texas.

== History ==
The Saxon Pub was founded by Joe Ables and Craig Hillis in 1990. Prior to opening, the location on Lamar Boulevard in had been the location of several clubs. It was originally launched as a folk music club, featuring musicians such as Steve Fromholz and Stephen Doster, but later began hosting blues, country, and rock musicians. The venue planned to move locations in 2014 due to rising rent prices but it was purchased by Keller Williams Realty co-founder Gary Keller in 2016. It was the subject of the 2019 documentary Nothing Stays the Same, The Story of The Saxon Pub.

== Venue ==
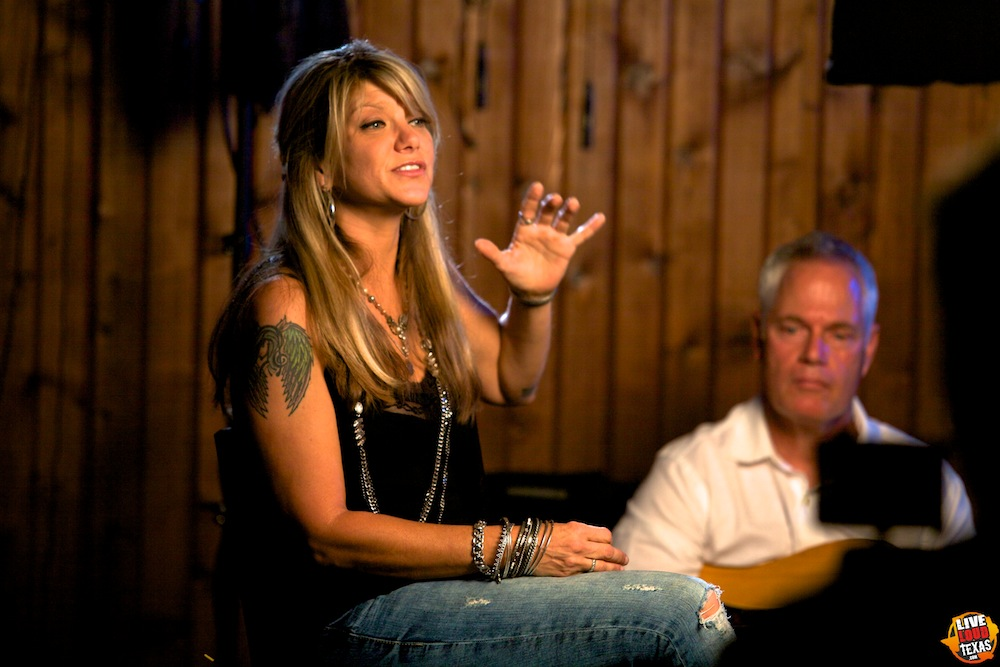
Paula Nelson at the Saxon Pub in 2011.

The Saxon Pub has an approximate 150 person occupancy. Musicians performing in the pub have included Monte Montgomery, Hayes Carll, Los Lonely Boys, Carolyn Wonderland, Parker McCollum and W.C. Clark. Musician Rusty Wier has performed and also has a statute on display at the venue.
