= Rock & Roll (Eric Hutchinson song) =

Single by Eric Hutchinson

from the album Sounds Like This
- Released: October 14, 2008
- Length: 3:58 (album version); 3:35 (radio/video version)
- Label: Warner Bros.
- Songwriter: Eric Hutchinson
- Producer: Will Golden

Eric Hutchinson singles chronology
| "Rock & Roll" (2008) | "OK, It's Alright with Me" (2009) |

Music video
- "Rock & Roll" on YouTube

"Rock & Roll" is a song by American singer-songwriter Eric Hutchinson, released as the first single from his major-label debut album, Sounds Like This. It became a hit, reaching the top 10 in Australia, the top five in New Zealand and Norway, and number one on the US Billboard Adult Alternative Songs chart. The song's music video was released in early 2008.

== Charts ==
=== Weekly charts ===
| Chart (2008–2009) | Peak position |
|---|---|
| Australia (ARIA) | 9 |
| New Zealand (Recorded Music NZ) | 4 |
| Norway (VG-lista) | 2 |
| US Bubbling Under Hot 100 (Billboard) | 7 |
| US Adult Alternative Airplay (Billboard) | 1 |
| US Adult Pop Airplay (Billboard) | 15 |

=== Year-end charts ===
| Chart (2008) | Position |
|---|---|
| US Adult Alternative Songs (Billboard) | 30 |

| Chart (2009) | Position |
|---|---|
| Australia (ARIA) | 54 |
| New Zealand (RIANZ) | 44 |
| US Adult Alternative Songs (Billboard) | 16 |
| US Adult Top 40 (Billboard) | 49 |

== Certifications ==
| Region | Certification | Certified units/sales |
|---|---|---|
| Australia (ARIA) | Platinum | 70,000^{^} |
| New Zealand (RMNZ) | Gold | 7,500^{*} |
| United States (RIAA) | Gold | 500,000^{*} |
^{*} Sales figures based on certification alone.^{^} Shipments figures based on certification alone.

== Release history ==
| Region | Date | Format(s) | Label | Ref. |
|---|---|---|---|---|
| United States | October 14, 2008 | Digital download | Warner | |
| United States | February 17, 2009 | Contemporary hit radio | Warner | |
| Australia | April 24, 2009 | CD single | Warner | |
