= Lay It Down (Cowboy Junkies album) =

Studio album by Cowboy Junkies
- Released: February 27, 1996
- Recorded: June–July 1995
- Genre: Indie rock, pop rock alternative country
- Length: 50:52
- Label: Geffen
- Producer: John Keane

Cowboy Junkies chronology
| 200 More Miles: Live Performances 1985–1994 (1995) | Lay It Down (1996) | Studio: Selected Studio Recordings 1986–1995 (1996) |

Singles from Lay It Down
- 1. "A Common Disaster" Released: 1996; 2. "Angel Mine" Released: 1996; 3. "Speaking Confidentially" Released: 1996; 4. "Come Calling" Released: 1997

Professional ratings
Review scores
| Source | Rating |
|---|---|
| AllMusic | 3/5 stars |
| The Encyclopedia of Popular Music | 3/5 stars |

Lay It Down is the sixth studio album by the Canadian alt-country band Cowboy Junkies. Released on February 27, 1996, it was the group's first album for Geffen Records after the end of their contract with RCA Records. It was the band's first album that could be described as straight-ahead rock, rather than country rock, country or blues. It was also their first album consisting entirely of original material, with no covers. "A Common Disaster" and "Speaking Confidentially" were notable hits for the band on Canadian radio.

The album also includes two versions of the track "Come Calling", which is presented in male and female versions representing two sides of a relationship of an elderly couple, dealing with the pain and anguish of Alzheimer's disease. The "Angel Mine" music video, featuring Janeane Garofalo, was filmed at the El Rey Theatre in Los Angeles. The song "Hold on to Me" was used in the soundtrack of the 1998 film Homegrown.

== Album development ==
The Junkies chose to step outside of Toronto to make Lay It Down. They looked for a location that was remote, but a comfortable drive from Toronto, and found Rock Island on Lake Kashabog, which was an island with one house on it. The Junkies visited the house one week at a time, spending time chopping wood, cooking, boating, and hiking, and also working on songs that had the same laid back feeling that the location had. A local person who ferried supplies and equipment over to the island was a gentleman that they knew as Zolt. Zolt had fought in the Korean war on the communist side, flying MIGs for the Bulgarian Air Force. He and his wife came over to the west in the 60s, and settled at Lake Kashabog. Unfortunately, latter in life, Zolt's wife developed Alzheimer's and had to be hospitalized. Their story became the basis for the song "Come Calling", one performed uptempo from the man's perspective as the survivor, and one performed more subdued, from the woman's perspective as the stricken.

When the band was ready to record the music, they looked for a studio that had the same vibe as Rock Island, with a sense of relaxed but focused mood, and a remoteness from the music industry. In Athens, Georgia, they found John Keane and his studio in a big-porched southern house. Keane was selected by the band for his laid-back, independent approach to recording, and also for an impressive resume of artists he had previously worked for. After touring with an expanded cast for the last three albums, the Cowboy Junkies felt a desire to pare back down to a foursome for their next work. The Junkies decided to focus on recording as a four-piece for this album, with Michael Timmins doing all the guitar work. Additional instrumentation was kept to a minimum, although the band introduced strings for the first time, on four of the tracks. Keane's assistant David Henry also played cello who recorded solo tracks and with the string quartet. Henry also toured with the band after the album's release. With the band's history of recording as a whole instead of individually, they wanted to record the strings in the same manner, in order to create a sound of playing with the band instead of just adding more sound. Andy Carlson wrote the arrangements and led the quartet with him on violin, Henry on Cello, Carl Schab also on violin, and Peter Schab on viola. The Junkies kind of let the quartet take over on "Speaking Confidentially". After the basic tracks were done, Michael Timmins spent a week doing guitar overdubs, and Margo followed up by doing vocal doubling and accompaniments, with Keane mixing the tracks into a whole.

== Track listing ==
All tracks are written by Michael Timmins except where noted

| No. | Title | Writer(s) | Length |
|---|---|---|---|
| 1. | "Something More Besides You" | | 4:15 |
| 2. | "A Common Disaster" | | 3:21 |
| 3. | "Lay It Down" | | 4:22 |
| 4. | "Hold On to Me" | | 3:22 |
| 5. | "Come Calling (His Song)" | | 3:33 |
| 6. | "Just Want to See" | | 4:23 |
| 7. | "Lonely Sinking Feeling" | | 4:24 |
| 8. | "Angel Mine" | | 3:59 |
| 9. | "Bea's Song (River Song Trilogy, Part II)" | | 3:33 |
| 10. | "Musical Key" | Michael Timmins, Margo Timmins | 3:55 |
| 11. | "Speaking Confidentially" | | 4:27 |
| 12. | "Come Calling (Her Song)" | | 5:00 |
| 13. | "Now I Know" | | 2:18 |
| Total length: | | | 50:52 |

== Personnel ==
Cowboy Junkies

- Margo Timmins – vocals
- Michael Timmins – guitar
- Alan Anton – bass
- Peter Timmins – drums

Additional musicians

- Jeff Bird – organ
- Tim White – organ
- John Keane – pedal steel guitar; arpeggiated guitar (track 5)
- Dave Henry – cello
- Andy Carlson – violin, string arrangement, horn arrangement
- Carl Schab – viola
- Peter Schab – violin

Production

- John Keane – producer, engineer, recorded by, mixed by
- Michael Timmins – producer
- Bob Ludwig – mastered
- Peter Moore – sequencing
- Dale Morningstar – additional recorded at The Gas Station, engineering
- Robert Cobban – additional recording at Studio 306, engineering
- Dave Henry – assistant engineer
- Guzman – photography
- Open Circle Design – design
- David Houghton – art direction
