= Ugly Americans (band) =

American rock band

Ugly Americans was an American rock band from Austin, Texas consisting of former members of Cracker, Mojo Nixon, and Poi Dog Pondering.

== History ==
Ugly Americans was founded in 1993 by musicians who played together at jam sessions organized by bassist Sean McCarthy at Antone's in Austin. The group played the HORDE Tour in 1994 and then supported Dave Matthews Band and Big Head Todd & the Monsters on tour in 1995. They released a live album in 1995 and a studio album in 1996; a sophomore studio effort arrived in 1998 before the band's breakup. Lead singer and songwriter Bob Schneider went on to a successful solo career.

== Members ==
- Bob Schneider - vocals
- Sean McCarthy - bass
- David Robinson - drums
- Max Evans - guitar
- Bruce Hughes - guitar
- Corey Mauser - Keyboards
- David Boyle - Keyboards

== Discography ==
- Ugly Americans (What Are Records, 1995)
- Stereophonic Spanish Fly (Capricorn Records, 1996)
- Boom Boom Baby (Capricorn records, 1998)
