= When the Sun Breaks Down on the Moon =

Album by Bob Schneider

Studio album by Bob Schneider
- Released: 2007
- Genre: Rock
- Length: 42:28
- Label: Shokorama
- Producer: Bob Schneider

Bob Schneider chronology
Greatest Hits Live (2006)	When the Sun Breaks Down on the Moon (2007)	Lovely Creatures (2009)

When the Sun Breaks Down on the Moon is the fourth solo studio album by Austin, Texas, singer-songwriter Bob Schneider, released in a limited edition in winter 2007.

While Schneider was on the road on his fall/winter US tour, he looked through all the latest demos that he had been working on, becoming more and more excited about this collection of songs which became When the Sun Breaks Down on the Moon.

"...most of these songs are pretty new. Recorded in the last couple of months and there is a cohesiveness to it that I really like and also, a fragility that usually doesn't end up on the more polished CD's that I've put out in the past." – Bob Schneider

== Track listing ==
No.	Title	Length
1.	"Changing Your Mind"	4:55
2.	"Slower Dear"	4:13
3.	"When the Sun Breaks Down on the Moon"	3:09
4.	"The Way We Roll"	3:45
5.	"The Stick Up"	2:51
6.	"Fist City"	3:41
7.	"Brown"	2:09
8.	"Best Laid Plans"	3:24
9.	"Blue Mountain"	4:13
10.	"Long Way Down"	2:57
11.	"Confessor"	5:08
12.	"How Do You Live Your Life"	3:03
Total length:		42:28
