= Judah & the Lion =

American band

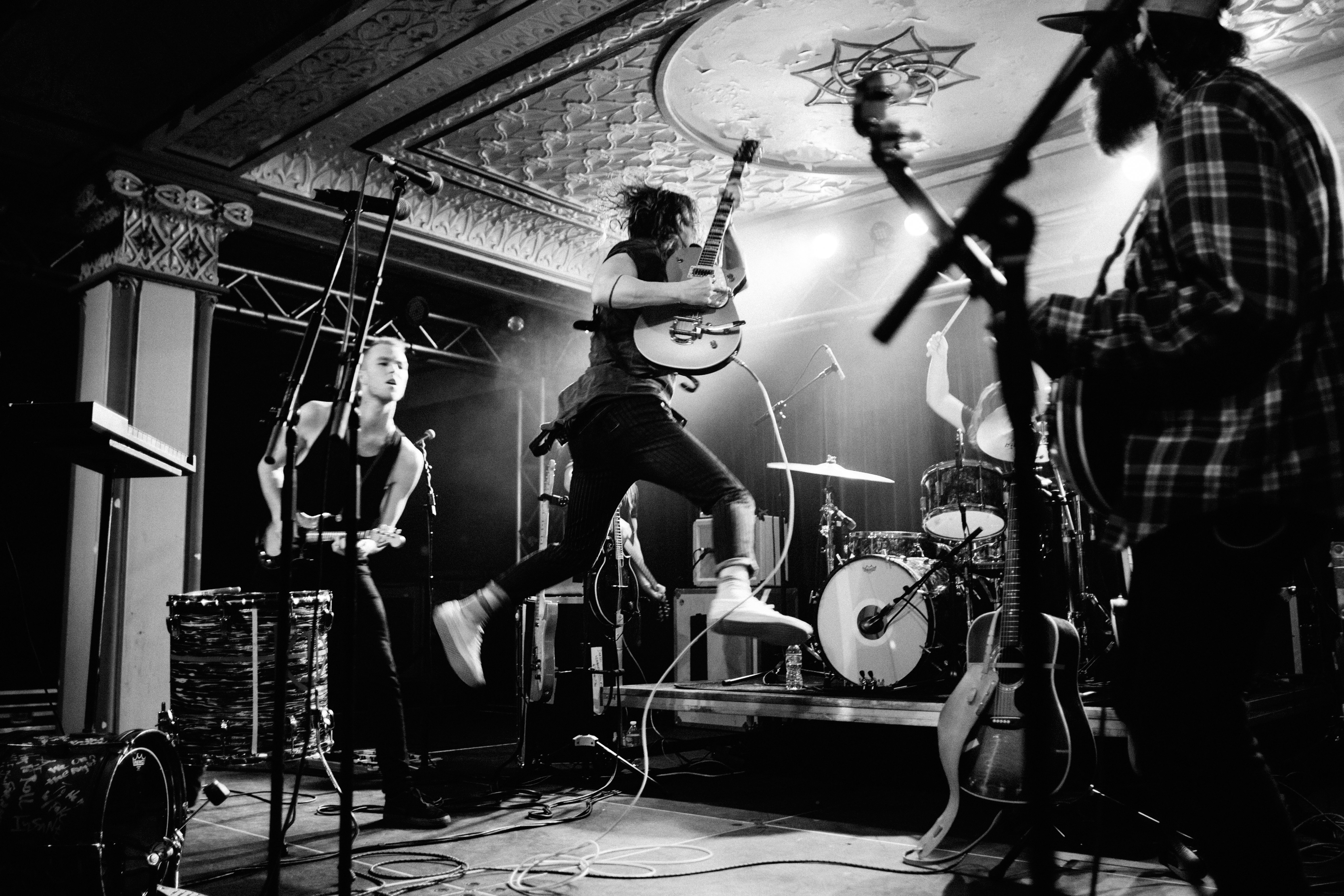
- Judah & the Lion performing in 2017

Background information
- Origin: Nashville, Tennessee, U.S.
- Genres: Americana; bluegrass; folk; rock; electropop
- Years active: 2011–present
- Label: Independent
- Members: Judah Akers; Brian Macdonald
- Past members: Spencer Cross; Nate Zuercher
- Website: judahandthelion.com

Judah & the Lion are an American rock and roll band from Nashville, Tennessee, formed in 2011. They have released five studio albums and five EPs. Currently the band consists of Judah Akers (vocals, guitar) and Brian Macdonald (mandolin, vocals).

== History ==
The original members of the band met while attending Belmont University in Nashville. At Belmont, Akers was a baseball player, Nate Zuercher was studying the banjo, and Macdonald was studying the mandolin. The band won Belmont's 2012 Best of the Best competition. The band released their first EP, First Fruits, on June 19, 2012.

Judah & the Lion released the EP Sweet Tennessee on April 16, 2013. It reached No. 2 on the Billboard Bluegrass Albums chart, No. 9 on the Heatseekers Albums chart, and No. 15 on the Folk Albums chart. In 2014, the band opened for Drew Holcomb and the Neighbors.

The band released their debut full-length studio album, Kids These Days, on September 9, 2014; it entered Billboard's Heatseekers chart at No. 2 and the Folk Albums chart at No. 4 in its debut week. During their touring schedule in support of Kids These Days, Judah & the Lion opened for Mat Kearney and Ben Rector. During their headlining tour, they performed for the first time in Sweden in 2015 and wrote a song for their fans titled "Stockholm", which would be included on their next album Folk Hop n’ Roll. They performed on Late Show with David Letterman on February 20, 2015.

Judah & the Lion released their second studio album, Folk Hop n' Roll, on March 4, 2016, putting them at No. 3 on the Alternative New Artist Chart. The album reached No. 2 on the Billboard Heatseekers Albums chart, No. 7 on the Billboard Americana/Folk Albums chart, and No. 17 on the Billboard Independent Albums chart. The album's sound was a mix of Americana, club pop, and hip-hop, which was polarizing to some of their longtime fans. In November 2016, Judah & the Lion released the Take It All Back 2.0 + Stockholm EP. The single "Take It All Back" reached No. 19 on the Hot AC Chart and No. 1 on Billboard's Alternative Songs chart for three consecutive weeks. The single was certified gold in September 2017 and platinum in October 2019. Like Kids These Days, Folk Hop n' Roll was produced by Dave Cobb. Cobb recorded the songs in a series of quick takes, aiming for performances that sounded real and raw rather than polished and perfect. The recording was completed in two weeks. The songs on Folk Hop n' Roll incorporate fuzz bass, hip hop percussion and distorted banjo riffs.

In January 2017, Billboard magazine named Judah & the Lion their first "Chartbreaker" artist. The same month, on January 12, 2017, the band made an appearance on Conan. Other television appearances in 2017 included The Late Late Show with James Corden on March 14, Good Morning America on June 5, and Jimmy Kimmel Live! on September 18.

The band toured the US, Canada and Europe in support of Folk Hop n' Roll. They made festival appearances at Bonnaroo, SunFest, Firefly, Governors Ball, Music Midtown, and Hangout Fest. They opened for Twenty One Pilots on their Emotional Roadshow Tour, Incubus and Jimmy Eat World on the 8 Tour in the US, and Kaleo's Express Tour in Canada and Europe.

Judah & the Lion headed back into the studio in early 2017 to record four new songs dubbed the Going to Mars Collection, which, when combined with Folk Hop n' Roll, make up Folk Hop n' Roll Deluxe. On March 10, 2017, Folk Hop n' Roll Deluxe was released. The rebooted version of the album includes the band's string quartet arrangement of "Take It All Back", "Suit and Jacket", which peaked at No. 4 on the Alternative Radio charts, and "Going to Mars", which peaked at No. 17 on the Alternative Radio charts.

The band released their third album, Pep Talks, on May 3, 2019. The album's seventeen songs explore thematic elements such as divorce and alcoholism intermixed with tracks covering lighter topics. It peaked at No. 18 on the Billboard 200 and No. 3 on the Alternative Albums chart, and features tracks with Kacey Musgraves and Jon Bellion. The single "Over My Head" reached No. 10 on the Billboard Alternative Songs chart, and "Why Did You Run?" reached No. 11 on Alternative Songs. The majority of the songs were written while the band was on the road touring on their previous album. The style of the album includes elements of folk, hip-hop, pop, and EDM. Leading up to the album's release, the band played it on tour, also telling stories about its creation. The album was produced by the band, alongside Drew Long and Daniel James. Nashville Lifestyles Magazine praised Pep Talks, with writer Luke Levenson commenting, "The record is intensely personal, remitting lyrics and sensibilities born out of Akers' family struggles, but it's also typically innovative—giving folk instruments new latitude through hip-hop-leaning beat and avant-pop accessibility."

On August 8, 2019, the band added an eighteenth song, "Let Go", which was simultaneously announced as ESPN's College Football Anthem for the 2019 season. "Why Did You Run?" was included on the EA Sports FIFA 20 soundtrack, and "Alright" was included on the EA Sports NHL 20 soundtrack. The single "Never Give Up on You" was released on February 21, 2020, as the official club anthem of the Major League Soccer team Nashville SC.

The band performed on Today in May 2019, Late Night with Seth Meyers on May 2, 2019, and Jimmy Kimmel Live! on March 19, 2019. From July to November 2019, the band toured the US, Canada, and the UK. They performed at Lollapalooza, Hangout Music Festival, Forecastle Festival, Outside Lands, and Austin City Limits.

The band announced the exit of member Nate Zuercher on November 8, 2021, although he continued to tour with the band.

Judah and the Lion released their fourth album, Revival, on June 10, 2022. Akers called the album their "pandemic record," as the band, after touring consistently for 8 years, took a hiatus due to the COVID-19 pandemic. Macdonald spent a year in Sweden, as he and Akers rested and wrote on their own. In the fall of 2021, they began recording the new album in Asheville, North Carolina, their first time recording outside of Tennessee. In support of the album, the band went on the 2022 Happy Again Tour, headlining 35 dates across the US. In 2023 and 2024, the band supported Needtobreathe on The Caves World Tour.

Judah and the Lion's fifth studio album, The Process, was released on May 10, 2024. Described as being about the five stages of grief, the album was announced on January 11, 2024, with the release of the single "Is What It Is". It includes appearances from Ruston Kelly and K.Flay.

In June 2026, Judah and the Lion announced their upcoming sixth album, I Am the Prism, would be released in August 2026. They also announced The Boys Are Back Tour, beginning in September 2026.

== Members ==
Current members

- Judah Akers – guitar, lead vocals
- Brian Macdonald – mandolin, backing vocals

Past members

- Spencer Cross – drums
- Nate Zuercher – banjo, backing vocals

== Discography ==
=== Studio albums ===
List of albums, with selected chart positions
Title	Details	Peak chart positions		
Title	Details	US	US Indie	US Rock
Kids These Days	Released: September 9, 2014; Label: Good Time Inc.; Formats: CD, digital download	102	20	34
Folk Hop n' Roll	Released: March 4, 2016; Label: Cletus the Van; Formats: CD, digital download, LP	— (Note: Folk Hop n' Roll did not enter the US Billboard 200, but peaked at No. 2 on the US Heatseekers Albums Chart.)	17	33
Pep Talks	Released: May 3, 2019; Label: Cletus the Van; Format: Digital download, streaming	18	3	2
Revival	Released: June 10, 2022; Label: Cletus the Van; Format: Digital download, streaming	—	—	2
The Process	Released: May 10, 2024; Label: Cletus the Van; Format: CD, LP, digital download, streaming	—	—	—
I Am a Prism	Releasing: August 14, 2026; Label: Dualtone Records; Formats: CD, LP, digital download, streaming	To be released		
"—" denotes a recording that did not chart or was not released in that territory.

=== Live albums ===
List of live albums
Title	Details
Pep Talks Live	Released: December 11, 2020; Label: Cletus the Van

=== Extended plays ===
List of extended plays, with selected chart positions
Title	Details	Peak chart positions	
Title	Details	US Heat	US Folk
First Fruits	Released: June 19, 2012; Label: Judah & the Lion; Formats: Digital download	—	—
Sweet Tennessee	Released: April 16, 2013; Label: Judah & the Lion; Formats: CD, digital download	9	15
Take It All Back (Remix EP)	Released: August 31, 2017; Label: Cletus the Van Records; Formats: Digital download	—	—
Pep Talks (Remix EP)	Released: March 20, 2020; Label: Cletus the Van Records; Formats: Digital download	—	—
Judah & The Lion (Unplugged)	Released: September 25, 2020; Label: Cletus the Van Records; Formats: Digital download	—	—
"—" denotes a recording that did not chart or was not released in that territory.

=== Singles ===
List of singles, with showing year released, peak chart positions and album name
Title	Year	Peak chart positions						Certifications	Album
Title	Year	US Bub.	US Adult	US Alt.	US Rock	CAN Rock	CZ Rock	Certifications	Album
"Rich Kids"	2014	—	—	—	—	—	—		Kids These Days
"Mason-Dixon Line"	2014	—	—	—	—	—	—		Kids These Days
"Graffiti Dreams"	2016	—	—	—	—	—	—		Folk Hop n' Roll
"Take It All Back"	2016	19	14	1	6	10	7	RIAA: Platinum	Folk Hop n' Roll
"Suit and Jacket"	2017	—	—	4	16	45	—	RIAA: Gold	Folk Hop n' Roll
"Going to Mars"	2018	—	—	17	— (Note: "Going to Mars" did not enter the Hot Rock & Alternative Songs chart, but peaked at No. 32 on the Rock Airplay chart.)	—	—		Folk Hop n' Roll
"Over My Head"	2019	—	—	10	30	40	—		Pep Talks
"Pictures" (featuring Kacey Musgraves)	2019	—	—	— (Note: "Pictures" did not enter the Alternative Airplay chart, but peaked at No. 12 on the Alternative Digital Songs chart.)	44	—	—		Pep Talks
"Why Did You Run?"	2019	—	—	11	22	—	—		Pep Talks
"Alright"	2019	—	—	—	—	—	—		Pep Talks
"Don't Mess with My Mama"	2019	—	—	—	—	—	—		Pep Talks
"Never Give Up On You"	2020	—	—	—	—	—	—		Judah & The Lion (Unplugged)
"Only To Be With You (Unplugged)"	2020	—	—	—	—	—	—		Judah & The Lion (Unplugged)
"human." / "Best is Yet to Come"	2020	—	—	—	—	—	—		non-album singles
"Beautiful Anyway"	2020	—	—	10	— (Note: "Beautiful Anyway" did not enter the Hot Rock & Alternative Songs chart, but peaked at No. 24 on the Rock Airplay chart.)	—	—		non-album singles
"Spirit"	2020	—	—	—	—	—	—		non-album singles
"Help Me to Feel Again"	2021	—	—	—	—	—	—		non-album singles
"Find Another Reason Why"	2021	—	—	—	—	—	—		Revival
"Take a Walk"	2022	—	—	—	—	—	—		Revival
"Happy Life"	2022	—	—	—	—	—	—		Revival
"Scream!"	2022	—	—	—	—	—	—		Revival
"Heart Medicine"	2023	—	—	—	—	—	—		The Process
"Only Want the Best"	2023	—	—	—	—	—	—		The Process
"Son of a Gun" (feat. K.Flay)	2023	—	—	—	—	—	—		The Process
"Leave It Better Than You Found It" (feat. Ruston Kelly)	2023	—	—	—	—	—	—		The Process
"Is What It Is"	2024	—	—	—	—	—	—		The Process
"Great Decisions"	2024	—	—	—	—	—	—		The Process
"Long Dark Night"	2024	—	—	23	—	—	—		The Process
"Floating In the Night"	2024	—	—	22	—	—	—		The Process
"Maybe the Best is Now"	2026	—	—	37	—	—	—		I Am a Prism
"—" denotes a recording that did not chart or was not released in that territory.

== Awards and nominations ==
Year	Award	Nominated work	Category	Result	Ref.
2018	iHeartRadio Music Awards	Judah & the Lion	Alternative Rock Artist of the Year	Nominated	
2018	iHeartRadio Music Awards	Judah & the Lion	Best New Artist	Nominated	
2018	iHeartRadio Music Awards	Judah & the Lion	Best New Rock/Alternative Rock Artist	Won	
