= I'm Good Now =

Album by Bob Schneider

Studio album by Bob Schneider
- Released: April 13, 2004
- Genre: Rock
- Length: 50:10
- Label: Universal
- Producer: Billy Harvey

Bob Schneider chronology
Lonelyland (2001)	I'm Good Now (2004)	The Californian (2006)

I'm Good Now is the sixth solo (and 4th studio) album from Bob Schneider, released April 13, 2004 through Shockorama Records and distributed by Vanguard. It was described by Allmusic.com as ' quite varied, echoing several singer/songwriter traditions', while popmatters found it 'an impressive batch of songs'. On the lyrics Schneider explained that 'none of them are autobiographical. They are all different narrators, they are all different personas'. No Depression magazine found the collection of song perhaps too eclectic and saying that 'even the most patient listener's endurance has been sorely, and possibly fatally, tested' towards the end. The album was awarded 'Album of the Year' at the Austin Music Awards of 2004. The album was produced by Billy Harvey, and featured contributions by Rafael Gayol and the Tosca String Quartet. The song "Love Is Everywhere" was featured in the film All About Steve.

== Track listing ==
All songs written by Bob Schneider.

No.	Title	Length
1.	"Come With Me Tonight"	4:29
2.	"Medicine"	3:20
3.	"A Long Way to Get"	2:19
4.	"The Way Life Is Supposed to Be"	4:08
5.	"I'm Good Now"	2:52
6.	"God Is My Friend"	3:03
7.	"C'mon Baby"	4:04
8.	"The Bridge Builders"	4:09
9.	"Captain Kirk"	3:11
10.	"Gold in the Sunset"	4:11
11.	"Piggyback"	5:04
12.	"Getting Better"	6:04
13.	"Love Is Everywhere"	3:07
Total length:		50:01

== Personnel ==
- Bob Scheider - vocals, guitars, bass, keyboards, drums and percussion.
- Billy Harvey - guitars, bass, keyboards, drums and percussion.
- Adam Temple - guitar
- Charles Reiser - guitar
- Dave McNair - guitar
- Bruce Hughes - bass, vocals
- Derek Morris - piano
- Kevin Lovejoy - organ
- David Boyle - keyboards
- David Robinson - drums
- Michael Longoria - drums
- Rafael Gayol - drums and percussion
- Danny Levin - cello and arrangement on "Love Is Everywhere".
- Tosca String Quartet - strings

Technical

- Billy Harvey - production/engineering
- Bob Schneider - production
- Dave McNair - engineering/mixing
- Jay Hudson - assistant engineering
- Max Crace - assistant engineering
- Noah Simon - assistant engineering
- Rafael Laski - assistant engineering
