= Lovely Creatures =

Studio album by Bob Schneider
- Released: September 29, 2009
- Length: 41:10
- Label: Kirtland Records
- Producer: Dwight Baker

Bob Schneider chronology
When the Sun Breaks Down On the Moon (2007)	Lovely Creatures (2009)	Live at the Paramount Theatre (2009)

Professional ratings
Review scores
Source	Rating
Allmusic	2.5/5 stars

Lovely Creatures is the eleventh solo album by Bob Schneider, released on September 29, 2009, through Kirtland Records. It was produced by Dwight Baker. A vinyl version of the album appeared in 2012. It features a duet with Patty Griffin and the single "40 Dogs (Like Romeo and Juliet)", supported by a video directed by Robert Rodriguez featuring Kat Dennings. A music video for the track "The Bringdown" was directed by Joey Boukadakis.

The Austin Chronicle called the album 'easily Schneider's most promising output' while the Victoria Advocate described it as Schneider's 'most polished, studio-centric collection yet'. The album charted at #140 in the Billboard 200.

== Track listing ==
1. "Trash" – 3:09
2. "Realness of Space" – 2:24
3. "40 Dogs (Like Romeo and Juliet)" – 4:13
4. "Till Somebody Catches A Feeling" – 2:16
5. "Changing Your Mind (featuring Patty Griffin)" – 5:11
6. "The Bringdown" – 3:44
7. "Slower Dear" – 3:41
8. "Everybody's Doing It" – 2:47
9. "Bombananza" – 3:15
10. "Your Head Holds Gold, Your Heart Holds Diamonds" – 3:15
11. "Tarantula" – 4:09
12. "Bicycle Vs. Car" – 3:12

=== Bonus tracks ===
All bonus tracks were made available for preorders from Bob Schneider's official website, along with early downloads from the album and two preview tracks from the "Live at the Paramount" recording.

1. "Gimme Gimme Gimme" (Amazon.com exclusive) – 3:58
2. "June" (Waterloo pre-order exclusive) – 3:39
3. "Ghosts" (iTunes exclusive) – 2:34
