= Lonelyland =

Studio album by Bob Schneider
- Released: March 13, 2001
- Genre: Rock
- Length: 59:54
- Label: Universal
- Producer: Carl Thiel

Bob Schneider chronology
Underneath the Onion Trees	Lonelyland (2001)	I'm Good Now (2004)

Professional ratings
Review scores
Source	Rating
Allmusic	3/5 stars

Lonelyland is the first studio album (and second ever solo project) by Bob Schneider, released March 13, 2001. It was distributed through Universal and produced by Carl Thiel. A limited "Texas Edition" also appeared with three additional tracks. In 2020 Bob Schneider announced via Twitter that a vinyl pressing would officially be released in 2021.

== Track listing ==
All songs written by Bob Schneider except as indicated.

1. "Metal and Steel" – 3:01
2. "Big Blue Sea" – 4:07
3. "Jingy" – 4:01
4. "Bullets" – 4:24
5. "The World Exploded into Love" – 3:01
6. "Round and Round" – 3:53
7. "Moon Song" – 4:14
8. "Madeline" (Schneider, David Boyle) – 7:37
9. "Tokyo" – 4:22
10. "Under My Skin" – 3:19
11. "Blue Skies for Everyone" – 3:33
12. "Better" – 2:54
13. "2002" – 4:11
14. "Oklahoma" – 7:15

== Texas Edition additional tracks ==
1. "The King of the World" – 10:06
2. "The World Passes You By" – 2:29
3. "The Grave of Señor Corizo" – 2:23
