= Rarities, B-Sides and Slow, Sad Waltzes =

Compilation album by Cowboy Junkies
- Released: October 12, 1999
- Genre: Alternative country
- Length: 47:04
- Label: True North, Latent (Canada); Valley (United States)
- Producer: Michael Timmins

Cowboy Junkies chronology
Miles from Our Home (1998)	Rarities, B-Sides and Slow, Sad Waltzes (1999)	Waltz Across America (2000)

Professional ratings
Review scores
Source	Rating
AllMusic	2.5/5 stars
Encyclopedia of Popular Music	3/5 stars

Rarities, B-Sides and Slow, Sad Waltzes is an album by the Canadian alt-country band Cowboy Junkies, released in 1999. It was the band's first independent release after the end of their contract with Geffen Records. The album is a compendium of tracks that the band had recorded but not previously released on an album. Two tracks have been released earlier as B-sides on Cowboy Junkies' singles, "If You Gotta Go, Go Now" on "Southern Rain" and "Leaving Normal" on "Anniversary Song". It was released on both True North Records and Latent Recordings in Canada, and on Valley Records in the United States.

== Album background ==
Rarities, B-Sides and Slow, Sad Waltzes was developed after the tour for Miles from Our Home. Geffen Records had gone through a merger, and in the process had stomped and squished Miles from Our Home, which caused the Cowboy Junkies to stand back and start making changes to take control of their music. They revived their early label, Latent Recordings, and set up a web-site for the label to share their music and thoughts with their fans. One of the first things they did was gather up several of their "orphaned" songs to release them to the world. The compilation album of rare and never before heard tracks, Rarities, B-Sides and Slow, Sad Waltzes, became the first release on Latent Recordings since The Trinity Session.

The hidden track on the album, My Father's House, is an a capella rendition of a Bruce Springsteen song that the band occasionally performed live. The version on the album was recorded during the Sharon Temples recordings sessions. As Michael Timmins states, "Margo was singing to help Peter Moore find his mic placement. The rest of us had obviously been sitting around too long and were getting bored so we spontaneously joined in. Just one of those weird, beautiful moments...and the tape was running."

== Track listing ==
All tracks are written by Michael Timmins, except where noted.

No.	Title	Writer(s)	Length
1.	"I Saw Your Shoes"		3:15
2.	"Five Room Love Story"		5:19
3.	"Sad to See the Season Go"		5:15
4.	"If You Gotta Go, Go Now"	Bob Dylan	3:07
5.	"Love's Still There"	Michael Timmins, Margo Timmins	3:32
6.	"To Lay Me Down"	Jerry Garcia, Robert Hunter	5:16
7.	"A Few Simple Words"	Michael Timmins, Margo Timmins	3:39
8.	"River Waltz"		4:04
9.	"Leaving Normal"		3:59
10.	"The Water is Wide"	Traditional	5:15
11.	"My Father's House" (Hidden track)	Bruce Springsteen	4:23
Total length:			60:19

== Personnel ==
Cowboy Junkies

- Margo Timmins – vocals
- Michael Timmins – guitar
- Alan Anton – bass
- Peter Timmins – drums

Additional musicians

- Ken Myhr – guitar (track 4, 5 & 10)
- Richard Bell – piano (track 5)
- Jeff Bird – harmonica, mandolin (tracks 1, 2, 4–6 & 10)
- Jaro Czerwinec – accordion (tracks 2, 5, 6 & 8)
- Kim Deschamps – dobro, pedal steel guitar (track 6)
- Spencer Evans – piano (track 2 & 4)
- Dave Houghton – percussion (tracks 1 & 9)

Production

- Michael Timmins – producer; engineer (track 3)
- Bob Cobban – engineer (tracks 4, 5 & 10)
- Bob Doidge, John Oliviera – engineer (tracks 2 & 6)
- Dale Morningstar – engineer (tracks 7 & 8)
- Tom Heron – engineer (tracks 1 & 9)
- Michael Halbwachs – digital imaging
- Dave Houghton – art direction
- Peter Moore – mastering at the E Room
