= Sounds Like This =

Studio album by Eric Hutchinson
- Released: May 20, 2008
- Recorded: 2007
- Genre: Pop, rock
- Length: 36:00
- Label: Warner Music Group
- Producer: Paul Q. Kolderie

Eric Hutchinson chronology
Before I Sold Out (2006)	Sounds Like This (2008)	Moving Up, Living Down (2012)

Professional ratings
Review scores
Source	Rating
AllMusic	link

Sounds Like This is the third studio album by singer/songwriter Eric Hutchinson. It was released on May 20, 2008. In the United States, the album is available as a single release in most retail and online stores. The album began at No. 1 on Billboard's Heatseekers chart in September 2007. This was helped greatly by a recommendation from blogger Perez Hilton.

== Track listing ==
All tracks are written by Eric Hutchinson.

No.	Title	Length
1.	"OK, It's Alright with Me"	2:30
2.	"You Don't Have to Believe Me"	3:45
3.	"Outside Villanova"	4:15
4.	"Food Chain"	3:41
5.	"Rock & Roll"	3:58
6.	"Oh!"	3:54
7.	"All Over Now"	3:44
8.	"It Hasn't Been Long Enough"	4:20
9.	"Back to Where I Was"	3:10
10.	"You've Got You"	4:38

== Personnel ==
- Eric Hutchinson – vocals, piano, acoustic guitar, keyboards, Moog bass, percussion
- Will Golden – drum programming, vibes, xylophone, guitar, harmonium, B-3, percussion
- Chris Chaney – bass
- Gary Novak – drums
- Deron Johnson – Wurlitzer, synths, piano solo on "Food Chain"
- Jason Gonzalez – electric guitars, lap steel guitar
- Theo Deacon – percussion
- Jamie Wollam – drums on "All Over Now"
- Jerome Deupree – drums on "It Hasn't Been Long Enough"
- Billy Hulting – congas on "Outside Villanova" and "You've Got You"
- Paul Pate – saxophone
- Mike Armstrong – saxophone, solo on "It Hasn't Been Long Enough"
- Paul Kolderie – electric sitar on "It Hasn't Been Long Enough"
- Fil Kroengold – clavinet and Wurlitzer on "All Over Now"
- Dave Yaden – clavinet on "Outside Villanova" and "Rock & Roll"
- The Oakwoods Clappers – Todd Strauss-Schulson, Steve Basilone, Dan Levy, James Kirkland, Jen Zaborowski and Robert Cappadona

== Charts ==
Chart (2007–09)	Peak position
Australian Albums (ARIA)	42
Norwegian Albums (VG-lista)	29
US Billboard 200	134
US Independent Albums (Billboard)	17
