= Clarín Awards =

Award sponsored by the Argentine newspaper Clarín

Clarín Entertainment Awards
- Native name: Premios Clarín Espectáculos
- Description: Excellence in Argentine entertainment, sports, literature, and advertising
- Sponsored by: Clarín
- Country: Argentina
- First award: 1998
- Website: http://www.premios.clarin.com/

The Clarín Entertainment Awards (Spanish: Premios Clarín Espectáculos) or simply the Clarín Awards (Premios Clarín) is an award program that has taken place in Argentina since 1998. Sponsored by the Argentine newspaper Clarín, the event honors Argentine achievements in entertainment, sports, literature, and advertising.

== Awards for best Argentine film ==
Year	Film	Director(s)
1998	Pizza, birra, faso	Bruno Stagnaro & Israel Adrián Caetano
1999	Mundo grúa Garage Olimpo	Pablo Trapero Marco Bechis
2000	Nueve reinas	Fabián Bielinsky
2001	El hijo de la novia	Juan José Campanella
2002	Historias mínimas	Carlos Sorín
2003	El fondo del mar	Damián Szifron
2004	El abrazo partido	Daniel Burman
2005	El aura	Fabián Bielinsky
2006	Crónica de una fuga	Israel Adrián Caetano
2007	XXY	Lucía Puenzo
2008	Aniceto	Leonardo Favio
2009	El secreto de sus ojos	Juan José Campanella

== Awards for best novel ==
FULL ARTICLE: Premio Clarín de Novela

Year	Title	Author
1998	Una noche con Sabrina Love	Pedro Mairal
1999	Inglaterra, una fábula	Leopoldo Brizuela
2000	Se esconde tras los ojos	Pablo Toledo
2001	Memorias del río inmóvil	Cristina Feijóo
2002	Las ingratas	María Guadalupe Henestrosa
2003	Perdida en el momento	Patricia Suárez
2004	El lugar del padre	Ángela Pradelli
2005	Las viudas de los jueves	Claudia Piñeiro
2006	Arte menor	Betina González
2007	Composición (Published as El lugar perdido)	Norma Huidobro
2008	Perder	Raquel Robles
2009	Más liviano que el aire	Federico Jeanmaire
2010	La otra playa	Gustavo Nielsen
2011	Lloverá sobre nosotros	Luis Lozano
2012	Sobrevivientes	Fernando Monacelli
2013	Bestias afuera	Fabián Martínez Siccardi
2014	Rebelión de los oficios inútiles	Daniel Ferreira
2015	¿Qué se sabe de Patricia Lukastic?	Manuel Soriano
2016	El canario	Carlos Bernatek
2017	Cadáver exquisito	Agustina Bazterrica
2018	Tú eres para mí	José Niemetz
2019	Negro el dolor del mundo	Marcelo Caruso
2020	Asomados a un pozo	Ignacio Arabehety
2021	Donde retumba el silencio	Agustina Caride
2022	El desierto invisible	Miguel Gaya
2023	Para hechizar a un cazador	Luciano Lamberti
2024	Si sintieras bajo los pies las estructuras mayores	Roberto Chuit Roganovich
2025	Cuaderno inglés	Daniel Morales

== See also ==
- Latin American television awards
