= Worthy =

Worthy can refer to:

== People ==
- Worthy (surname)
- Worthington "Worthy" Patterson (1931–2022), American basketball player
- F. F. Worthington, nicknamed "Worthy"

== Places ==
- Worthy, see List of generic forms in place names in Ireland and the United Kingdom
- Worthy, Somerset, a hamlet near Porlock

== Companies ==
- Worthy Book, a Malaysian voucher booklet publisher
- Worthy.com, an online marketplace for pre-owned luxury goods

== Arts and entertainment ==
- Worthy (Bettye LaVette album), 2015
- Worthy (India Arie album), 2019
- "Worthy" (song), by San Holo
- Worthy, a 2017 album by Beautiful Eulogy
- Worthy, a 2019 album by India Arie
- The Worthy, a group of fictional characters in Marvel comics - see Fear Itself (comics)
- The Worthy, a 2016 movie by Ali F. Mostafa
- Worthy, a song in Elevation Worship's Hallelujah Here Below album

== Other uses ==
- USNS Worthy (T-AGOS-14), a Missile Range Instrumentation Ship operated by the United States Army
- Worthy Hotel, Springfield, Massachusetts, on the National Register of Historic Places
- Worthy FM, the onsite radio station of The Glastonbury Festival

== See also ==
- Nine Worthies, a group of nine figures considered paragons of chivalry
- The Worthys, a cluster of four villages in the City of Winchester district, Hampshire, England
