= Slow Decay =

Studio album by the Acacia Strain
- Released: July 24, 2020
- Recorded: 2020
- Genre: Metalcore; sludge metal; deathcore
- Length: 43:00
- Label: Rise
- Producer: Randy LeBoeuf

The Acacia Strain chronology
It Comes in Waves (2019)	Slow Decay (2020)	Step Into the Light / Failure Will Follow (2023)

Singles from Slow Decay
- 1. "D (Feed a Pigeon Breed a Rat/Seeing God)" Released: February 28, 2020; 2. "E (Solace And Serenity/The Lucid Dream)" Released: March 20, 2020; 3. "C (I Breathed in the Smoke Deeply It Tasted Like Death and I Smiled/Crossgates)" Released: April 17, 2020; 4. "A (Inverted Person/Chhinnamasta)" Released: May 15, 2020; 5. "Y (One Thousand Painful Stings/EARTH WILL BECOME DEATH)" Released: June 12, 2020; 6. "Slow (Crippling Poison/Birds of Paradise, Birds of Prey)" Released: July 26, 2020

Slow Decay is the tenth studio album by American metalcore band the Acacia Strain. It was released on July 24, 2020, through Rise Records, though originally scheduled for release a week earlier, on July 17.

The songs in the album were all released as six two-track singles, the first five of which were released in the months leading up to the album's release with one-letter titles spelling out the word "DECAY". Guest vocalists in the album include Aaron Heard (Jesus Piece), Jess Nyx (Mortality Rate), Zach Hatfield (Left Behind), and Courtney LaPlante (Spiritbox).

The album went on to have over 12,000 copies sold within a week after its release, over 9,000 of which being pure copies, selling more than their previous albums such as Coma Witch and Gravebloom had in their respective initial weeks of release. The album peaked in the Billboard charts at #87 in the Top 200 chart and #3 in the Hard Rock Albums chart, along with #5 in Current Albums, Top Album Sales, and Vinyl Albums.

== Track listing ==
Slow Decay track listing
No.	Title	Length
1.	"Feed a Pigeon, Breed a Rat"	3:39
2.	"Crippling Poison"	2:34
3.	"Seeing God" (featuring Aaron Heard)	2:48
4.	"Solace and Serenity"	4:37
5.	"The Lucid Dream" (featuring Jess Nyx)	4:05
6.	"I Breathed In the Smoke Deeply, It Tasted Like Death and I Smiled" (featuring Zach Hatfield)	4:44
7.	"Crossgates"	1:08
8.	"Inverted Person"	3:23
9.	"Chhinnamasta"	3:50
10.	"One Thousand Painful Stings" (featuring Courtney LaPlante)	4:29
11.	"Birds of Paradise, Birds of Prey"	3:46
12.	"Earth Will Become Death"	3:57
Total length:		43:00

== Personnel ==
=== The Acacia Strain ===
- Vincent Bennett – vocals
- Kevin Boutot – drums
- Devin Shidaker – guitar
- Tom Smith, Jr. – guitar
- Griffin Landa – bass

=== Additional personnel ===
- Aaron Heard (Jesus Piece) – vocals on "Seeing God"
- Jess Nyx (Mortality Rate) – vocals on "The Lucid Dream"
- Zach Hatfield (Left Behind) – vocals on "I Breathed in the Smoke Deeply, It Tasted like Death and I Smiled"
- Courtney LaPlante (Spiritbox) – vocals on "One Thousand Painful Stings"

== Charts ==
Chart performance for Slow Decay
Chart (2017)	Peak position
US Billboard 200	87
US Independent Albums (Billboard)	12
US Top Hard Rock Albums (Billboard)	3
US Top Rock Albums (Billboard)	11
