= Unworthy =

Unworthy may refer to:

== Music ==
- Unworthy, a 1976 album by The Clark Sisters
- "Unworthy", a 1992 single by Thieves
  - Unworthy, a 1993 album by David McAlmont, formerly of Thieves
- Unworthy, a 2013 EP by Convictions
- "Unworthy", a song by Commissioned from the 2006 album Praise & Worship
- "Unworthy", a song by DJ Casper from the 2000 album Cha Cha Slide
- "Unworthy", a song by Godflesh from the 2004 EP Merciless
- "Unworthy", a 2017 single by Vancouver Sleep Clinic

== Other uses ==
- Nalayak ('Unworthy'), a 1978 Bollywood film
- The Unworthy, a 2023 horror novel by Argentine author Agustina Bazterrica

== See also ==
- Worthless (disambiguation)
- Worthy (disambiguation)
- Humility, the quality of being humble
- Life unworthy of life, a Nazi designation for segments of the population
- Parable of the Master and Servant in the Bible, from which comes the liturgical phrase "unworthy servants"
- The Unworthy Thor, in the Marvel comics universe
- Unworthy Republic, a 2020 book by Claudio Saunt
