= Premio Clarín de Novela =

- Awarded for: Unpublished novels written in the Spanish language
- Sponsored by: Grupo Clarín
- Date: Annually
- Country: Argentina
- First award: 1998

The Premio Clarín de Novela is a prize for literature in the Spanish language awarded annually by Grupo Clarín. It was created in 1998 and its first awardee was Pedro Mairal. The winner receives 300,000 pesos ($) and the publication of their novel by the Clarín Alfaguara label. It is one of the most prestigious literary contests in Latin America. Writers from all over the world participate every year with unpublished works written in Spanish.

== List of winners ==
- 1998 Pedro Mairal, Una noche con Sabrina Love
- 1999 Leopoldo Brizuela, Inglaterra, una fábula
- 2000 Pablo Toledo, Se esconde tras los ojos
- 2001 Cristina Feijóo, Memorias del río inmóvil
- 2002 María Henestrosa, Las ingratas
- 2003 Patricia Suárez, Perdida en el momento
- 2004 Ángela Pradelli, El lugar del padre
- 2005 Claudia Piñeiro, Las viudas de los jueves
- 2006 Betina González, Arte Menor
- 2007 Norma Huidobro, El lugar perdido
- 2008 Raquel Robles, Perder
- 2009 Federico Jeanmaire, Más liviano que el aire
- 2010 Gustavo Nielsen, La otra playa
- 2011 Luis Lozano, El imitador de Dios
- 2012 Fernando Monacelli, Sobrevivientes
- 2013 Fabián Martínez Siccardi, Bestias afuera
- 2014 Daniel Ferreira, Rebelión de los oficios inútiles
- 2015 Manuel Soriano, ¿Qué se sabe de Patricia Lukastic?
- 2016 Carlos Bernatek, El canario
- 2017 Agustina María Bazterrica, Cadáver exquisito
- 2018 José Niemetz, Tú eres para mí
- 2019 Marcelo Caruso, Negro el dolor del mundo
- 2020 Ignacio Arabehety, Asomados a un pozo
- 2021 Agustina Caride, Donde retumba el silencio
- 2022 Miguel Gaya, El desierto invisible
- 2023 Luciano Lamberti, Para hechizar a un cazador
- 2024 Roberto Chuit Roganovich, Si sintieras bajo los pies las estructuras mayores
- 2025 Daniel Morales, Cuaderno inglés
