= The Most Unknown =

The Most Unknown may refer to:

- The Most Unknown (film)
- The Most Known Unknown -- DVD recorded by The Acacia Strain
