= Worthless =

Worthless or The Worthless may refer to:

- The Worthless, a 1908 play by Jacob Gordin
- The Worthless (film), a 1982 Finnish film

== Music ==
- Worthless, a 2011 album by Weekend Nachos
- "Worthless", a song by A Thorn for Every Heart from It's Hard to Move You
- "Worthless", a song by Agoraphobic Nosebleed from Bestial Machinery (Discography Volume 1)
- "Worthless", a song by Bosnian Rainbows from Bosnian Rainbows
- "Worthless", a song by Bullet for My Valentine from Venom
- "Worthless", a song by Buried Alive from The Death of Your Perfect World
- "Worthless", a song by Charon from A-Sides, B-Sides & Suicides and Tearstained
- "Worthless", a song by Chimaira from Resurrection
- "Worthless", a song by Colossus from Badlands
- "The Worthless", a song by Dååth from The Concealers
- "Worthless", a song by Dido from Odds & Ends
- "Worthless", a song by Doomriders from Black Thunder
- "Worthless", a song by Faithless from Faithless – Renaissance 3D
- "Worthless", a song by Home Grown from That's Business
- "Worthless", a song by Lost Society from No Absolution
- "Worthless", a song by Ministry from Adios... Puta Madres, Houses of the Molé, and MiXXXes of the Molé
- "Worthless", a song by No Secrets, leftover track from No Secrets
- "Worthless", a song by Point of Grace from I Choose You
- "Worthless", a song by Pretty Maids from Planet Panic
- "Worthless", a song by The Acacia Strain from Gravebloom
- "Worthless", a song by The Exit from New Beat
- "Worthless", a song by Whitehouse from Mummy and Daddy
- "Worthless", a song by X Marks the Pedwalk from The Killing Had Begun
- "Worthless", a song by Young Fresh Fellows from Because We Hate You
- "Worthless", a song by Your Demise from The Golden Age
- "Worthless", a song from the film The Brave Little Toaster

== See also ==
- Unworthy (disambiguation)
