= IPawn =

iPawn
- Company type: Pawnbroker
- Founded: 2011
- Headquarters: Tyler, Texas, United States
- Area served: United States
- Services: Secured loans, luxury goods reseller
- Website: www.ipawn.com

iPawn is a company that specializes in providing financial solutions through the acquisition of gold items. They offer a service that allows individuals to sell gold articles for cash, such as jewelry and coins. The company primarily serves individuals looking to convert their gold into cash quickly and securely. It is based in Tyler, Texas. iPawn raised over $4 million in investment in 2013.

== Services ==
Non-recourse loans against valuables, also referred to as pawn loans or asset-based loans, and buying and selling previously owned valuables, are the two primary services offered by iPawn.

Consumers and small enterprises can receive lending and retail services. iPawn offers its services in exchange for high-end products like jewelry, diamonds, gemstones, precious metals and expensive watches.

== History ==
iPawn was established with the purpose of utilizing the latest technologies and internet for the veteran pawnbroking industry and to serve as a high-end pawn broker, delivering a simple, private way to get loans or sell high end goods through the internet. The idea came after learning about the high interest rates charged by pawn shops. The company launched its services to the public in July 2012. In March 2013 iPawn closed $4 million in its second round of financing from a group of angel investors led by Dr. Rafi Gridron. On May 12, 2014 iPawn announced the launch of a new brand called Worthy dealing only in after-market sales.

== Brick & Mortar Pawn Shop Vs. Online Pawn Shop ==
While services provided by a brick and mortar pawn shop are similar to those provided by the online ones, there are few main differences: most notably, the means by which services are rendered. In a brick and mortar pawn shop, the process of receiving a loan or selling a valuable is done in person while in an online pawn shop the process is conducted through the internet and a courier of choice. The low inventory overhead results in the ability to provide higher value and lower interest rates. Another notable difference is the appraisal process of the submitted valuables: in a brick and mortar pawn shop, the appraisal is done in the local shop itself while in an online pawn shop, all items are shipped to a central facility where the appraisal is made.

== Licenses and Accreditation ==
iPawn is a licensed pawn shop certified by the Texas Office of Consumer Credit Commissioner (OCCC). Additionally, iPawn holds a precious dealer certificate, also granted by the Texas OCCC. iPawn is accredited by the Better Business Bureau.

== Partnerships ==
iPawn has partnered in 2012 with FedEx and ParcelPro to provide insured shipping services. iPawn also partnered with Delta Lloyd in the same year to provide insurance to its facilities.

== In the Media ==
In August 2013, MSN Money Watch discussed how iPawn caters to affluent individuals and families that don't need money immediately but want a more sizable loan to help their cash flow. In an article published in July 2013, Reuters discusses the benefits of the purely online transactions carried out by iPawn, focusing on the desired discretion amidst the negative stigma of pawn shops.

In May 2013, LearnVest brought into focus the story of a dentist who chose to use iPawn to sell family jewelry instead of a traditional bank loan.

Yahoo New Zealand published an article in March 2013 shedding light on the new world of online pawn shops and what to expect when utilizing their services.

South Coast Today Describes in an article published January 2013 how small business are turning to pawn shops for short-term loans, a better suited alternative to traditional bank loans.

Early in 2013, TIME Business and Finance discussed the reinvention of the pawn industry and its transition to the internet.

KETK NBC Sits down with iPawn COO in December 2012 to talk about bringing the pawn shop online.

In December 2012, NuWire Investor provided a detailed layout of the upscale online pawn industry and its move away from the originally bad stigma attached to pawn shops.

Later in December 2012, the New York Post wrote about the appeal of high-end online pawn shops from small business owners to wealthy celebrities.

== See also ==
- Pawnbroker
- Arrowhead Pawn Shop
