= The Most Known Unknown =

Video by The Acacia Strain
- Released: February 16, 2010
- Recorded: Worcester, Massachusetts
- Genre: Metalcore
- Label: Prosthetic

The Acacia Strain chronology
Continent (2008)	The Most Known Unknown (2010)	Wormwood (2010)

The Most Known Unknown is a DVD recorded by The Acacia Strain on December 28, 2008, in Worcester, Massachusetts at The Palladium. The band shared the stage with The Red Chord, Whitechapel, Shipwreck AD, Cruel Hand, and Thy Will Be Done.

It was given a rating of three stars by AllMusic.

== Disc 1 – Live At The Palladium ==
1. "Whoa! Shut It Down!"
2. "See You Next Tuesday"
3. "3750"
4. "4x4"
5. "Skynet"
6. "Brown Noise"
7. "As If Set Afire"
8. "Dr. Doom"
9. "Baby Buster"
10. "Cthulhu"
11. "Burnface"
12. "The Combine"
13. "Angry Mob Justice"
14. "The Behemoth (Intermission)"
15. "Demolishor"
16. "Balboa Towers"
17. "Passing The Pencil Test"
18. "Forget-Me-Now"
19. "Sun Poison And Skin Cancer"
20. "JFC"
21. "Carbomb"

== Disc 2 – Live At The Waterfront + Extras ==
1. "Whoa! Shut It Down!"
2. "See You Next Tuesday"
3. "3750"
4. "4x4"
5. "Brown Noise"
6. "Angry Mob Justice"
7. "As If Set Afire"
8. "Dr. Doom"
9. "Burnface"
10. "Sun Poison And Skin Cancer"
11. "Carbomb"

The Acacia Strain: A Retrospective
Ten Seconds of Fame (The Golden Ticket Holders)
Music Videos: Skynet, Angry Mob Justice, Smoke Ya Later
