= Bernatek =

Bernatek is a Polish surname. Notable people with the surname include:

- Carlos Bernatek (born 1955), Argentine writer
- Mateusz Bernatek (born 1994), Polish Greco-Roman wrestler
