= ...So Unknown =

Studio album by Jesus Piece
- Released: April 14, 2023
- Recorded: 2021
- Studio: The Machine Shop (Belleville)
- Genre: Metalcore
- Length: 27:46
- Language: English
- Label: Century Media
- Producer: Randy Leboeuf

Jesus Piece chronology
Only Self (2018)	...So Unknown (2023)

Between being in the world of fashion and electronic music and seeing how DJs run things, getting to work with some of the biggest artists in any capacity helped me look at the limitations of what we can and can't do. Now that I was able to be in those areas, we can go any way and I'll have a really good context on how we can handle ourselves. It's not "what we can't do," but more... should we be taking these things? Should we be handling ourselves this way? You gotta understand, I always prefer quality over quantity, so do we have to take every tour? No. Do we have to say yes to every single thing? It gave me a way of planning things in a different way.

— Drummer Luis Aponte on genre experimentation on ...So Unknown

...So Unknown is the second and final studio album by American metalcore band Jesus Piece. Released on April 14, 2023, it comes five years after debut Only Self and has received positive reviews from critics.

== Reception ==
Professional ratings
Aggregate scores
Source	Rating
Metacritic	77/100
Review scores
Source	Rating
Kerrang!	4/5
Metal.de	5/10
MetalSucks	4.5/5 stars
Pitchfork	7.3/10
Rock Hard	7.5/10
Rolling Stone	4/5 stars
Slant Magazine	3.5/5 stars

According to the review aggregator Metacritic, ...So Unknown received "generally favorable reviews" based on a weighted average score of 77 out of 100 from five critic scores. Olly Thomas of Kerrang! rated this album 4 out of 5, pointing out the attention to detail and stating that it results in "an involving listen, but emphatically doesn't detract from the band's primary intention of rearranging your skeletal structure through elastic, chugging riffs and neck-snapping beats". Metal Injection's Max Heilman gave ...So Unknown an 8.5 out of 10, calling it "exciting, emotive, and ball-busting hardcore taken to the next level by smart writing". Mandy Scythe of MetalSucks scored this 4.5 out of 5, exhorting readers, "If you're a fan of hardcore, or if you're just looking for something a little outside of your usual metal menu that still delivers the riffs, check out ...So Unknown. It's an album that will change the way you think about hardcore music."

Pitchfork editors chose ...So Unknown as one of the 10 albums of the week for readers to hear and critic Matthew Ismael Ruiz scored it a 7.3 out of 10 as a band that "boast a unique mix of aggressive East Coast grooves and call-and-response vocals, offsetting metal's melodic and theatrical tendencies with hardcore's propulsive energy" and particularly noting the virtuosity of drummer Luis Aponte. Rolling Stone critic Ian Blau awarded the album four stars out of five, stating that the band "avoid the repetitive and rough aspects of their debut by growing exponentially as musicians, focusing their songwriting, and becoming more capable of translating the energy of their live show into nuanced studio performances". In Slant Magazine, Steve Erickson gave this release 3.5 out of 5 stars, characterizing it as "the album feels more defined by genre than the band's past work, but the anger running through it is contagious" and summing up that the music "creates a stark contrast to the majority of recent pop-rock, which carries a mood of depressed resignation". This was an Editor's Pick at Spill Magazine, where Ryan Ruple scored it a 9 out of 10, predicting, "as far as metal records go this year, encompassing all sub genres, ...So Unknown is going to be in several End Of The Year lists for fans". Writing for Sputnikmusic, YoYoMancuso scored this work a 3.0 out of 5, summing up that it is "a flawed record, but still a worthwhile one to check out".

=== Accolades ===
On June 23, Alternative Press published an unranked list of the top 25 albums of the year to date and included this release, calling it "a chaotic listen from start to end, brimming with metallic aggression, savage breakdowns, and smart songcraft".

...So Unknown on year-end lists
Publication	List	Rank
Alternative Press	50 best albums of 2023	—N/a
Consequence	30 Best Metal and Hard Rock Albums of 2023	7
Decibel	Top 40 Albums of 2023	4
Invisible Oranges	20 Best Metalcore Albums of 2023	2
Kerrang!	The 50 best albums of 2023	8
Loudwire	The 25 Best Rock + Metal Albums of 2023	—N/a
MetalSucks	Top Albums of 2023	—N/a
PopMatters	The 20 Best Metal Albums of 2023	14
Rolling Stone	The 11 Best Metal Albums of 2023	4
Revolver	30 Best Albums of 2023	17
Revolver	10 Best Hardcore Albums of 2023	3

== Track listing ==
1. "In Constraints" – 2:19
2. "Fear of Failure" – 3:06
3. "Tunnel Vision" – 3:23
4. "FTBS" – 2:12
5. "Silver Lining" – 3:55
6. "Gates of Horn" – 2:18
7. "Profane" – 2:11
8. "An Offering to the Night" – 2:13
9. "Stolen Life" – 3:20
10. "The Bond" – 2:48

== Personnel ==
Jesus Piece

- John Distefano – guitar
- Luis Aponte – drums
- Aaron Heard – vocals
- Anthony Marinaro – bass guitar
- David Updike – guitar

Additional personnel

- Randy Leboeuf – production

== See also ==
- 2023 in American music
- List of 2023 albums
