= María Henestrosa =

Argentine writer

Maria Guadalupe Henestrosa is an Argentine writer. A trained biologist, she worked as a science journalist. She won the Premio Clarin de Novela in 2002 for her novel Las ingratas, the story of five sisters who migrated from Europe to Argentina in the 1920s.
