= Only Self =

Studio album by Jesus Piece
- Released: August 24, 2018
- Recorded: Bricktop Recording Studio (Chicago, Illinois)
- Genre: Metalcore; sludge metal
- Length: 29:23
- Label: Southern Lord
- Producer: Andy Nelson

Jesus Piece chronology
Jesus Piece (2015)	Only Self (2018)	...So Unknown (2023)

Only Self is the debut studio album from American metalcore band Jesus Piece. It was released through Southern Lord Records on August 24, 2018, and produced by Andy Nelson of Weekend Nachos.

== Critical reception ==
Professional ratings
Review scores
Source	Rating
Exclaim!	7/10
Metal Hammer	4/5 stars
Metal Injection	8.5/10
New Noise Magazine	4/5 stars
Pitchfork	7.6/10
Stereogum	positive

The album has received positive reviews from critics.

Writing for Pitchfork Andy O'Connor stated: "They're part of a new metalcore movement that proves that experimentation and succinct, clobbering riffs can not only coexist but make for natural partners. On their first full-length, Only Self, they make the case that such should be the new tradition."

== Track listing ==
Only Self track listing
No.	Title	Length
1.	"Lucid"	3:14
2.	"Workhorse"	1:58
3.	"Punish"	2:57
4.	"Curse of the Serpent"	2:08
5.	"In the Silence"	4:15
6.	"Adamant"	2:04
7.	"Neuroprison"	2:04
8.	"Dog No Longer"	3:18
9.	"I"	3:00
10.	"II"	4:20
Total length:		29:23

== Personnel ==
Jesus Piece

- Aaron Heard – lead vocals
- David Updike – guitars
- John Distefano – guitars
- Anthony Marinaro – bass
- Luis Aponte – drums

Production

- Brad Boatright – mastering
- Andy Nelson – producer
- Dom Pabon – album artwork
