= Death Is the Only Mortal =

Studio album by The Acacia Strain
- Released: October 9, 2012
- Recorded: January – July 2012 at DLR Studios, Chicopee, Massachusetts / Stillwork Studios, Holyoke, Massachusetts
- Genre: Deathcore; metalcore
- Length: 45:04
- Label: Rise
- Producer: Daniel Laskiewicz

The Acacia Strain chronology
Wormwood (2010)	Death Is the Only Mortal (2012)	Coma Witch (2014)

Singles from Death Is the Only Mortal
- 1. "Victims of the Cave" Released: September 6, 2012; 2. "The Mouth of the River" Released: September 24, 2012

Professional ratings
Review scores
Source	Rating
Metal Injection	9/10
MetalSucks	3.5/5 stars

Death Is the Only Mortal is the sixth studio album by American deathcore band The Acacia Strain. It was released on October 9, 2012. It is the band's first release on Rise Records and their final album with Daniel "DL" Laskiewicz as their guitarist before leaving the band in May 2013. The opening track, “Doomblade”, contains a sample from the 2012 horror film, The Devil Inside.

The first single, "Victims of the Cave", was released on September 6, 2012. The second single, "The Mouth of the River", was released on September 24, 2012.

== Track listing ==
No.	Title	Length
1.	"Doomblade"	4:17
2.	"Our Lady of Perpetual Sorrow"	4:30
3.	"Go to Sleep" (featuring Kirk Windstein)	4:12
4.	"Brain Death"	4:16
5.	"The Mouth of the River"	4:27
6.	"Dust & the Helix"	2:10
7.	"Victims of the Cave"	4:08
8.	"Time & Death & God"	5:47
9.	"The Chambered Nautilus"	4:29
10.	"House of Abandon"	6:58
Total length:		45:04

== Personnel ==
- Vincent Bennett - lead vocals
- Daniel "DL" Laskiewicz - guitars, programming, bass, backing vocals, string arrangements
- Kevin Boutot - drums

Production

- Daniel "DL" Laskiewicz - production, engineering, mixing
- Joey Sturgis - mastering
- Angrblue - Art direction, design, illustrated

== Production ==
- Produced, Engineered & mixed by Daniel «DL» Laskiewicz, January – July 2012, @ DLR Studios, Chicopee / Stillwork Studios, Holyoke, Massachusetts
- Mastered by Joey Sturgis, @ The Foundation Recording Studio, Connersville, Indiana
- Drum engineering by Daniel «DL» Laskiewicz & Benjamin Jon
- Additional guitar by Antonio Diaz
- Management by Leah Urbano & Scott Lee (Crimson Management)
- Art direction, Design & illustration by Justin Kamerer (angryblue.com)
