= It Comes in Waves =

Studio album by the Acacia Strain
- Released: December 26, 2019
- Recorded: 2019
- Genre: Deathcore; post-metal; black-doom
- Length: 30:11
- Label: Closed Casket Activities

The Acacia Strain chronology
Gravebloom (2017)	It Comes in Waves (2019)	Slow Decay (2020)

Professional ratings
Review scores
Source	Rating
Exclaim!	9/10
KillYourStereo	4.5/5 stars
Metal Injection	9/10

It Comes in Waves is the ninth studio album by American metal band The Acacia Strain. It was released on December 26, 2019, through Closed Casket Activities. The track titles spell out the phrase "Our Only Sin Was Giving Them Names". The band announced a February 2020 tour in support of the album with Rotting Out, Creeping Death, Chamber and Fuming Mouth.

== Track listing ==
It Comes in Waves track listing
No.	Title	Length
1.	"Our"	3:44
2.	"Only"	2:43
3.	"Sin"	3:59
4.	"Was"	5:45
5.	"Giving"	2:54
6.	"Them"	2:19
7.	"Names"	8:47
Total length:		30:11

== Personnel ==
=== The Acacia Strain ===
- Vincent Bennett – lead vocals
- Kevin Boutot – drums
- Devin Shidaker – guitar, backing vocals
- Tom Smith, Jr. – guitar
- Griffin Landa – bass

=== Production and design ===
- Mix and mastered by Steve Seid (Graphic Nature Audio)
- Cover art by MFAXII
