= The Dead Walk =

Studio album by The Acacia Strain
- Released: June 13, 2006
- Recorded: December 2005 – February 2006, April 2006
- Studio: Zing Studios
- Genres: Metalcore; deathcore
- Length: 31:57
- Label: Prosthetic
- Producers: The Acacia Strain, Adam D.

The Acacia Strain chronology
3750 (2004)	The Dead Walk (2006)	Continent (2008)

Singles from The Dead Walk
- 1. "Angry Mob Justice" Released: August 3, 2006

Professional ratings
Review scores
Source	Rating
allmusic.com	4/5 stars

The Dead Walk is the third studio album by the American metalcore band The Acacia Strain. It was produced by the band and Adam D. of Killswitch Engage. The album was released through Prosthetic Records. This is the band's first with drummer Kevin Boutot and last with bassist Seth Coleman and guitarist Daniel Daponde.

The album was originally titled Victims and was set to be released on March 21, 2006. The album title was eventually changed to its current title and the release date for the album was pushed back to June 13, 2006.

== Track listing ==
All tracks are written by Daponde, Laskiewicz, Bennett.

No.	Title	Length
1.	"Sarin: The End"	0:28
2.	"Burnface"	2:33
3.	"4X4"	2:25
4.	"As If Set Afire"	3:14
5.	"Angry Mob Justice"	2:50
6.	"Whoa! Shut It Down!"	2:58
7.	"See You Next Tuesday"	3:15
8.	"The Demolishor"	3:11
9.	"Pity"	3:45
10.	"Predator; Never Prey"	3:31
11.	"The Dead Walk"	3:47
Total length:		31:57

== Personnel ==
The Acacia Strain

- Vincent Bennett – lead vocals
- Daniel "DL" Laskiewicz – guitar, programming
- Daniel “Outhouse” Daponde – guitar, bass, backing vocals
- Seth Coleman – bass
- Kevin Boutot – drums

Production

- Adam D. – producer, mixing
- Wayne Krupa – mixing
- Alan Douches – mastering
- Paul A. Romano – art direction, artwork, design

Guest musicians

- Mike DC (Damnation AD) – vocals on "See You Next Tuesday", gang vocals
- Lou Tanuis (On Paths of Torment) – vocals on "Predator; Never Prey", gang vocals
- Phil Labonte (All That Remains) – vocals on "Predator; Never Prey", gang vocals
- Keith Holuk (Ligeia) – vocals on "Predator; Never Prey", gang vocals
- Nate Johnson (ex-Fit For An Autopsy) – vocals on "Predator; Never Prey", gang vocals
- Mitch Lucker (ex-Suicide Silence) – vocals on "Predator; Never Prey", gang vocals
- Rusty Asunder (Torn Asunder) – vocals on "The Dead Walk", gang vocals
- Tyler Schienost – gang vocals
- "Doofy" – gang vocals

== Charts ==
Chart (2006)	Peak position
US Heatseekers Albums (Billboard)	40
US Independent Albums (Billboard)	47
