= Daniel Ferreira (writer) =

Colombian writer and blogger

Daniel Ferreira (born 1981) is a Colombian writer and blogger. He was born in San Vicente de Chucuri in the mountainous province of Santander, and moved to Bogotá to study linguistics at the National University. He is the author of several award-winning novels such as La balada de los bandoleros baladíes, Viaje al interior de una gota de sangre. Ferreira won the Premio Clarin de Novela for Rebelión de los oficios inútiles in 2014.

In 2017, he was named as one of the Bogota39, a selection of the best young writers in Latin America.
