= The Unworthy =

2023 horror novel by Agustina Bazterrica

- First edition cover art
- Author: Agustina Bazterrica
- Original title: Las indignas
- Translator: Sarah Moses
- Language: Spanish
- Genre: Horror
- Publisher: Alfaguara (Spanish), Scribner (English)
- Publication date: 5 December 2023 (Spanish); 4 March 2025 (English)
- Publication place: Argentina
- Pages: 192 (Spanish paperback)
- ISBN: 9798890980137

The Unworthy (Spanish: Las indignas) is a 2023 horror novel by Agustina Bazterrica. It was translated into English by Sarah Moses in 2025. The novel received critical praise for its exploration of religion and feminism in a post-apocalyptic setting.

== Plot ==
A woman writes about her life as a member of the Sacred Sisterhood. She uses scrap paper, berries, discarded ink, and sometimes her own blood to record her story. The narrative is fragmented, often cutting off mid-sentence as she hides her writing from the other women. (Note: Every time the narrator writes the word "woods", she scratches it out and replaces it with a synonym.)

The sisterhood is a cult that has taken over an abandoned Catholic monastery. The unnamed narrator is a member of the "unworthy," a caste within the sisterhood. Ranked below the unworthy are the servants, who are physically deformed. Above the unworthy, there are the Chosen, who are all ritually mutilated. Members of the highest rank are Enlightened; they live separately and are never seen. The convent is led by the Superior Sister and a mysterious man known only as "Him." The unnamed narrator dreams of advancement to become Enlightened. To do this, she must follow the strict and often violent rules of the order. She and Lourdes, another unworthy, have frequent petty conflicts due to jealousy and desire for advancement.

The narrative progresses as the protagonist writes about day-to-day activities within the convent. More information about the outside world is gradually revealed. The world has experienced a climate apocalypse, leading to famines, flooding, and the collapse of modern society. The narrator cannot recall much of her past life. She writes about arriving at the convent and being let inside by Helena, an unworthy. Helena was later discovered to worship the Christian God, who is considered a false god by the Sisterhood. As punishment, she was buried alive.

One of the Chosen is murdered. Mariel, an unworthy who was supposed to care for the Chosen, is whipped and burned alive. At the Chosen's funeral, the narrator begins to recall memories from her past life. She remembers her mother, who taught her to read and died when the narrator was young. She also remembers her time among a group of orphans who called themselves the tarantula children. They taught each other survival skills and formed a small community, but eventually they were murdered by adults. The narrator was the only survivor.

In the present, a wanderer named Lucía arrives at the convent. The narrator becomes infatuated with Lucía and the two begin a forbidden romance. They begin meeting inside a hollow tree, hiding their romance from the other women of the convent. Simultaneously, the narrator begins writing about a friend named Circe, whom she met after the deaths of the tarantula children. Circe is implied to be human, but is later revealed to be the narrator's pet cat. The narrator tells Lucía about a traumatic part of her past. During her wanderings, the narrator entered some woods, where she was attacked and raped by a group of men. These men also killed Circe. (Note: This event explains why the narrator never writes the word "woods". However, after confiding in Lucía, she is able to write the word freely.) After these events, the traumatized narrator wandered alone until she found the Sisterhood.

Lucía and the narrator return from a tryst to find a Chosen murdered in the convent's garden. Lourdes starts a rumor that Lucía was the culprit. The narrator poisons Lourdes with amanita mushrooms, causing her to behave erratically. During another romantic encounter, the narrator and Lucía watch as the Superior Sister assaults Lourdes and begins to strangle her. Hidden by veils, they attack the Superior Sister and rescue Lourdes. However, the next morning, they find that Lourdes has been executed by hanging, blamed for the death of the Chosen.

Lucía is chosen to become Enlightened and is taken to a separate area of the convent. The narrator picks the lock to rescue her. She witnesses Lucía being raped by Him, learning that this is the fate of all the Enlightened. The narrator attacks the Superior Sister but is stabbed during the fight. The wounded narrator and Lucía escape into the woods, along with several other women from the convent. The narrator, dying of her wounds, stays behind while the others escape. The bleeding narrator finishes her writings and leaves them in the hollow of the tree where she and Lucía often met. The narrative ends as she hears bells approaching her.

== Major themes ==
=== Treatment of women ===
Kirkus Reviews compared the book to The Handmaid's Tale, writing that "no matter how the world dies, women always seem to end up with the same sorry fortune." Madeline Schultz stated that the characters "encouraged to inflict physical punishments on themselves and the nuns around them," simply for the crime of existing. Additionally, Bazterrica sets the novel in a monastery, which is a holy place twisted to evil purposes. In this way, the author examines the way in which "women bear the brunt of shame and sacrifice while being painted as sinister and sly." Melissa A. Watkins of Lightspeed wrote that the novel examines women oppressing other women in service to a man.

Mahvesh Murad of Reactor praised Bazterrica's ability to sustain the reader's attention despite the unlikeable cast. Murad notes that the narrator "does some awful things; out of fear, out of spite, out of frustration..." The review concludes that, just as in her previous novel, Bazterrica presents women as "as nuanced, complicated, fallible and ultimately human."

=== Religion ===
One of the Sisterhood's mottos is that "without faith, there is no refuge." In this way, Bazterrica ties the narrator's survival to her faith, which is filled with cruelty and violence. Mahvesh Murad writes that the novel is "a brutal look at exploitation and the dissolution of bodily autonomy under the guise of religion." Melissa A. Watkins wrote that the novel explores the perceived failures of the Catholic Church during a worldwide societal collapse. According to this review, the Sisterhood represents the disavowal of one belief system, replacing one system for an even more oppressive alternative.

Cory Oldweiler of the Los Angeles Review of Books wrote about the Sisterhood and its formation. In a world of climate catastrophe, the Sisterhood promises safety by stating that its rituals can protect its members. Though the narrator participates in the violence to the extent required, her diary reveals that she is "relatively clear-eyed" about the Sisterhood's true nature. Oldweiler writes that the reader can immediately see the true nature of the Sisterhood, which is "a cult that exists for no other purpose than the horrifying gratification of its founders via the subjugation, manipulation, and abuse of young women." According to the same review, Bazterrica's narrative "skewers the means that organized religions employ to exert control over their flocks."

== Style ==
The book is an epistolary novel. It is presented as a first-person diary written by the unnamed narrator. The writing is often interrupted mid-thought or even in the middle of words. John Mauro writes that this style reveals the "quick evolution" of the narrator's thoughts as she writes them down.

== Reception and awards ==
Writing for Locus, Gabino Iglesias praised the way in which Bazterrica throws the reader into the story with minimal exposition, allowing the reader to uncover the outside world's secrets as the novel progresses. Iglesias wrote that the author is "a fantastic writer with a unique voice" and praised the work as some of Bazterrica's best writing to date. Melissa A. Watkins of Lightspeed also commented on the exposition, writing that the narrator "gives us hundreds of creepy little details that make things worse the more you think about them." Watkins concluded that the "downer ending" was not surprising given the story's premise, but praised the book for "the little keyhole glimmer of hope it leaves behind."

In a starred review, Becky Spratford of Library Journal stated that the book has wide appeal than Tender Is the Flesh, calling it "even more immersive and disquieting, as the apocalyptic climate it describes hits closer to home." Spratford praised the "engaging and humanizing voice" of the unreliable narrator. Publishers Weekly wrote that the book "examines religious devotion and the search for tenderness in a world torn apart by climate collapse." The review praised the translation by Sarah Moses, writing that it captures the "lush lyricism" with which Bazterrica describes the "harrowing" events of the novel. Madeline Schultz of Chicago Review of Books stated that the book "balances fable, fiction, and fearlessness in a truly unforgettable fashion." Schultz awarded the book five stars out of a possible five, praising it for its timely exploration of women's rights in a world full of "rampant misogyny."

Kirkus Reviews review stated that the narrative could be tough to follow because of the narrator's fragmented memory, and that the denouement could be unsatisfying. Nevertheless, the review called the work "caustically original" as well as "unflinching and provocative." John Mauro of Grimdark Magazine wrote that the novel contains many great ideas, but that none of them feel fully fleshed out. Mauro felt that the love story was the best part of the novel, but that the other subplots never fully developed beyond the book's synopsis. Mauro praised the "clipped" writing style and noted that fans of Tender Is the Flesh would likely enjoy it. However, he concluded that the novel was "scant" and may leave readers wanting more.

The novel was a finalist for the 2026 Locus Award for Best Translated Novel.
