= Step into the Light / Failure Will Follow =

- Step into the Light cover

Studio album by the Acacia Strain
- Released: May 12, 2023
- Recorded: 2022
- Genre: Step Into the Light: Deathcore, metalcore Failure Will Follow: Sludge metal, doom metal
- Length: 23:33 (Step Into the Light); 38:42 (Failure Will Follow); 62:15 (total)
- Label: Rise
- Producer: Randy LeBoeuf

The Acacia Strain chronology
Slow Decay (2020)	Step into the Light / Failure Will Follow (2023)	You Are Safe from God Here (2025)

Additional cover
- Failure Will Follow cover

Singles from Step into the Light
- 1. "Untended Graves" Released: December 14, 2022; 2. "Chain" Released: April 20, 2023

Step into the Light and Failure Will Follow are the eleventh and twelfth studio albums by American extreme metal band the Acacia Strain. They were released on May 12, 2023, through Rise Records. They are the band's first albums to feature rhythm guitarist Mike Mulholland, replacing Tom Smith who left the band in 2022, and the last to feature longtime drummer Kevin Boutot.

Step into the Light features 10 tracks of the band's usual deathcore/metalcore style that are mostly each under three minutes long, and it features guest vocals from Jacob Lilly (Chamber) and Josef Alfonso (Sunami). Failure Will Follow consists of three tracks that are each over 10 minutes long that show "the sludgier side of the band".

== Track listing ==
Step into the Light track listing
No.	Title	Length
1.	"Flourishing"	1:17
2.	"Calf's Blood"	1:40
3.	"Chain" (featuring Jacob Lilly)	1:12
4.	"Fresh Bones"	2:29
5.	"Teeth of the Cursed Dog"	2:40
6.	"Open Wound"	1:54
7.	"Sinkhole" (featuring Josef Alfonso)	3:50
8.	"Is This Really Happening?"	2:57
9.	"Untended Graves"	2:17
10.	"None of Us Asked to Be Here"	3:17
Total length:		23:33

Failure Will Follow track listing
No.	Title	Length
1.	"Pillar of Salt" (featuring Dylan Walker and iRis.EXE)	11:32
2.	"Bog Walker" (featuring Sam Sawyer)	17:00
3.	"Basin of Vows" (featuring Ethan McCarthy and Abra Bigham)	10:10
Total length:		38:42

== Personnel ==
=== The Acacia Strain ===
- Vincent Bennett – lead vocals
- Devin Shidaker – lead guitar, backing vocals
- Mike Mulholland – rhythm guitar, backing vocals
- Griffin Landa – bass
- Kevin Boutot – drums

=== Additional personnel ===
- Jacob Lilly – vocals on "Chain"
- Josef Alfonso – vocals on "Sinkhole"
- Dylan Walker - vocals on "Pillar of Salt"
- iRis.EXE - vocals on "Pillar of Salt"
- Sam Sawyer - vocals on "Bog Walker"
- Ethan McCarthy - vocals on "Basin of Vows"
- Abra Bigham - spoken word on "Basin of Vows"

=== Production ===
- Produced by Randy Leboeuf
