= You Are Safe from God Here =

Studio album by the Acacia Strain
- Released: October 24, 2025
- Recorded: 2025
- Genres: Metalcore, deathcore
- Length: 37:50
- Label: Rise
- Producer: Randy LeBoeuf

The Acacia Strain chronology
Step into the Light / Failure Will Follow (2023)	You Are Safe from God Here (2025)

You Are Safe from God Here is the thirteenth studio album by American deathcore/metalcore band the Acacia Strain, released on October 24, 2025, through Rise Records. The album continues the band's signature dark aesthetic, delving into themes of existential dread, misanthropy, cosmic judgement and metaphysical escape.

== Background ==
In July 2025 the band officially announced the release of their upcoming album titled You Are Safe From God Here, set to be released October 26, 2025 through Rise Records. The group noted in a joint statement that the record is “unapologetically the Acacia Strain. It's angry, it's sad, it's us,” they further clarified. “We made a record that made us feel uncomfortable. We hope it makes you feel the same way.”

The announcement was accompanied by the release of the first single off their new album, titled “A CALL BEYOND”, along with a music video for the song. The music video has a comedic tone and consists of the band in a game show setting, with various contestants spinning a wheel landing on various forms of torture. Lead vocalist Vincent Bennett acts as game show host, with the band seen performing live as well as participating in the game show itself.

The band commented on the song and music video with Heaviest of Art in July 2025:

"We had a hard time landing on one song to release first over all the others — it gets more difficult to pick 'one song' every time we put out a new record. We felt 'A CALL BEYOND' was a good introduction to this era of TAS. We all have about 1,000 ideas for music videos we want to use, and we basically picked this one out of a hat! Devin came up with the idea of a game show, and Mike titled it. We all had a hand in coming up with the different 'misfortunes,' and Matt and Eric took the reins on the rest. We are really happy to make a video featuring a bunch of our friends, and realize Matt and Devin's artistic vision."

The second single released in support of You Are Safe From God was released on August 15, 2025 titled “HOLY MOONLIGHT” along with its music video. The video was directed and edited by Stu “Muffins” Mcdonald and features the song being played over footage of the band performing live.

The album’s third single, titled “SWAMP MENTALITY”, was released along with its music video on September 26, 2025. The music video is a spoof on B-movie science fiction and horror movies, intentionally emphasizing on low-budget aesthetics and campy effects. The video features the band being “created” by two hooded creatures in an underground laboratory. However, when the band are finally shown, they are revealed to be bloody skeleton versions of themselves. Regarding the concept of the new single, The Acacia Strain would state:

“The swamp is a place of rot, death, and decay, but it is also ripe with life and regeneration. You are safe from God in the points of darkness and decomposition. Seek your sanctuary. No one leaves the swamp.”

=== Artwork ===
The artwork for You Are Safe From God Here was done by visual artist C. Williams, better known as Filthgarden. In an interview with Metal Insider in October 2025, The Acacia Strain guitarist Devin Shidaker said of the origin of the album’s artwork:

“Our manager, Dog, was like, ‘Hey, I know this guy who is a tattoo artist and he does a lot of artwork that kind of fits that style.’ And I am, of course, completely spacing on his name at the moment, but he sent it our way and we were like, ‘Yeah, let’s give this guy a shot,’ and he nailed it. I’m in love with this artwork.”

== Track listing ==
You Are Safe from God Here track listing
No.	Title	Length
1.	"Eucharist I: Burnt Offering"	2:04
2.	"A Call Beyond"	2:13
3.	"Swamp Mentality"	1:50
4.	"The Machine That Bleeds" (featuring Brody King & Colin Young of God's Hate)	1:55
5.	"Mourning Star"	2:01
6.	"I Don't Think You Are Going to Make It"	2:04
7.	"Acolyte of the One"	2:45
8.	"Aeonian Wrath"	1:13
9.	"Holy Moonlight"	2:14
10.	"Sacred Relic"	2:49
11.	"World Gone Cold"	2:50
12.	"Eucharist II: Blood Loss" (featuring Sunny Faris of Blackwater Holylight)	13:47
Total length:		37:50

== Personnel ==
The Acacia Strain

- Vincent Bennett - vocals
- Matt Guglielmo - drums
- Griffin Landa - bass
- Mikael Mulholland - guitar
- Devin Shidaker - guitar

Additional personnel

- Colin Young and Brody King of God’s Hate - vocals on track 4
- Sunny Faris of Blackwater Holylight - vocals on track 12

Production

- Randy LeBoeuf - mastering, mixing, production, recording

== Reception ==
Professional ratings
Review scores
Source	Rating
Blabbermouth	8.5/10
Sputnikmusic	4.5/5
Boolin Tunes	10/10
Angry Metal Guy	3.5/5
The Alternative	5/5

Reviews for You Are Safe From God Here have been generally positive, with many critics calling it one of the band's best and heaviest albums to date. Reviewers praise its cohesive, suffocating sound that blends deathcore, doom, and sludge, as well as its focused and uncompromisingly heavy vision. The album is noted for its brutal heaviness, atmospheric production, and powerful vocal performance from Vincent Bennett.

Blabbermouth gave the album an 8.5/10, and described the album as “ Warped and crushing, but somehow eerily beautiful” while also hailing it as, “…one of the most original and affecting metal moments of the year. A triumph for intelligence and individuality, but also an album that will cheerfully smash your skull in.”

Writer Shane C. of music website Boolin Tunes gave the record a perfect 10/10 score, writing “If there exists any essential listen in a year that has been rife with career-defining releases, it is You Are Safe From God Here.” He went on to describe the album as “not just a blueprint for how to architect a generational album, but a gleaming pretense for how heavy music should be universally approached going forward.”

In a positive review, Jordeana Bell for Metal Insider praised the band saying “Instead of ‘reinventing themselves,’ The Acacia Strain doubles down on being the heaviest, ugliest, and most relentlessly bleak band in the room.” Online music blog The Alternative also praised the album, citing it as one of the best metal albums of 2025. In their review of the album, The Alternative wrote “You Are Safe From God Here is not only my favorite record to be released in 2025; it’s one of the best albums The Acacia Strain has ever released, and it’s a standout in an excellent year for heavy music as a whole.”

In an extremely positive review, Sputnikmusic gave the album a 4.5/5, praising The Acacia Strain’s growth and intensity; “You Are Safe From God Here feels like the final culmination of everything the band has been slowly building toward. The album is a perfect amalgamation of all of their influences throughout the years, forged into one cohesive package[...] They’ve stayed true to their roots while naturally expanding their sonic palate with different influences.” They also praised the album’s musical scope and dark, thematic direction, saying “It’s a perfect way to satisfy old fans while bringing in brand new ones.”

The Angry Metal Guy gave the album a positive review, calling You Are Safe From God Here as the band’s best album to date, while also complimenting the band’s more focused direction; “Retaining that hugeness they are renowned and hated for in equal measure, while fusing its more experimental styles into a cohesive whole guided by a singular theme, the deathcore veterans show willingness to experiment without sacrificing their brand.” While praising the album, the site also had a mixed response to the album’s raw production, commenting that the album saw the band “declawing some of the more vicious numbers and dropping the facade for its more manufactured pieces – keeping the band from the greatness of which they are so capable. That being said, You Are Safe From God Here is a banger for the better.”

== Charts ==
Chart performance for You Are Safe from God Here
Chart (2025)	Peak position
US Top Album Sales (Billboard)	19
