= Betina Gonzalez =

Argentine writer (born 1972)

- Born: 1972 (age 53–54); Greater Buenos Aires, Argentina
- Education: University of Buenos Aires; University of Texas at El Paso
- Occupation: Writer
- Writing career
- Notable awards: Clarín Annual Literary Prize

Betina González (born 1972) is an Argentine writer.

== Biography ==
Born in the Greater Buenos Aires metro area, she studied Social Communications at the University of Buenos Aires, where she worked as a professor and a researcher. In 2003 she moved to Texas to pursue an M.F.A. in creative writing at the University of Texas at El Paso. She graduated in 2006. The same year, Arte Menor, her first novel, won the Clarín Annual Literary Prize for novels, one of the most important literary awards in Latin America. The book was listed among the Argentine best sellers of that year.

Arte Menor, a story of a daughter in search of her father’s elusive figure memory, was defined by Rosa Montero as "A fascinating work of magic about identity and imagination, about filial love and the uncertainness of life." Eduardo Belgrano Rawson characterized the novel as a "detective story written with humor and intelligence about a daughter determined to solve the mystery of her father." José Saramago considered that Betina Gonzalez had demonstrated, through her sense of proportion and balance, a "real command of such a complex genre as the novel." "Of this novel, Arte Menor, it can be said that only in its title is it ‘minor’ art. What comes after the title is certainly, a work of major art," stated the Portuguese author.

In 2006, the Argentine National Fund for the Arts awarded Betina González the second prize for Juegos de Playa, a collection of tales formed from a novella and four short stories. Juegos de Playa, the novella that gives the title to the book, explores the fears and fantasies of a little girl during the 1982 Falkland War between Argentina and the United Kingdom.

== Works ==
- Arte menor, Buenos Aires: Clarín-Alfaguara, December 2006 ISBN 950-782-945-8
- Juegos de playa, Buenos Aires: Clarín-Alfaguara. Nouvelle y cuentos, 2008, ISBN 9789870702382
- Las poseídas, Tusquets, January 2013, ISBN 978-9876701365
- El amor es una catástrofe natural, Tusquets, January 2014, ISBN 978-9876705301
- América alucinada, Tusquets, January 2013, ISBN 978-9876703628; English: American Delerium, trans. Heather Cleary, Henry Holt and Co., February 2021, ISBN 9781250621283.
