= Gustavo Nielsen =

Argentine writer

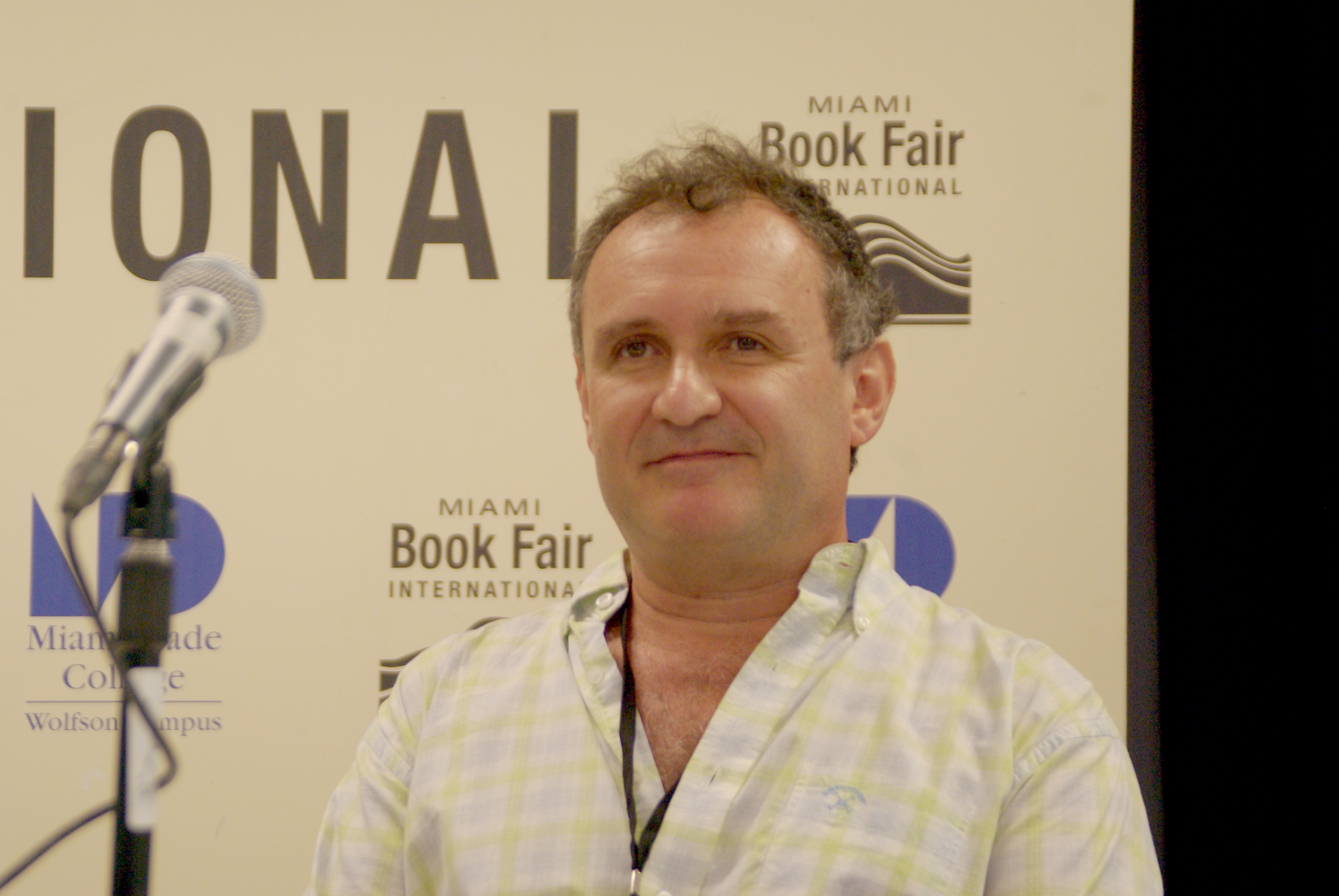
Gustavo Nielsen

Gustavo Nielsen is an Argentine architect and writer. He was born in Buenos Aires in 1962.

His books include "Playa quemada" (stories, Alfaguara), "La flor azteca" (novel, Planeta), "El amor enfermo" (novel, Alfaguara), "Los monstruos del Riachuelo" (novel, Alfaguara), "Marvin" (stories, Alfaguara), "Auschwitz" (novel, Alfaguara), "El corazón de Doli" (novel, El Ateneo), "La otra playa" (novel, Alfaguara) and "Blind faith" (stories). He won the 2010 Premio Clarin de Novela for La otra playa.

As an architect, he works at the award-winning architectural firm Galpón Estudio, which is based in Buenos Aires.
