= Wormwood (The Acacia Strain album) =

Studio album by The Acacia Strain
- Released: July 20, 2010
- Recorded: April–May 2010
- Studio: Planet Z Studios, Hadley, MA
- Genre: Deathcore, metalcore
- Length: 47:32
- Label: Prosthetic
- Producer: Zeuss

The Acacia Strain chronology
| Continent (2008) | Wormwood (2010) | Death Is the Only Mortal (2012) |

Professional ratings
Review scores
| Source | Rating |
|---|---|
| Allmusic | 3.5/5 stars |
| Rock Sound | 8/10 |

Wormwood is the fifth studio album by American extreme metal band The Acacia Strain. The album was released on July 20, 2010. Wormwood reached No. 67 on the US Billboard Top 200 chart. The song "Jonestown" was released as a single in June 2010 and was available at the website for Prosthetic Records.

== Track listing ==
All music is composed by Daniel Laskiewicz.

| No. | Title | Length |
|---|---|---|
| 1. | "The Beast" | 4:04 |
| 2. | "The Hills Have Eyes" | 4:21 |
| 3. | "BTM FDR" | 3:51 |
| 4. | "Ramirez" | 2:26 |
| 5. | "Terminated" | 3:14 |
| 6. | "Nightman" | 2:52 |
| 7. | "The Impaler" | 4:35 |
| 8. | "Jonestown" | 3:18 |
| 9. | "Bay of Pigs" | 5:18 |
| 10. | "The Carpathian" | 3:18 |
| 11. | "Unabomber" | 4:48 |
| 12. | "Tactical Nuke" | 5:34 |
| Total length: | | 48:15 |

== Personnel ==
Production and performance credits are adapted from the album liner notes.

The Acacia Strain

- Vincent Bennett – lead vocals
- Daniel "DL" Laskiewicz – lead and rhythm guitars, programming, backing vocals
- Jack Strong – bass
- Kevin Boutot – drums

Production

- Zeuss – producer, engineer, mixing, mastering
- Paul Mocadlo – assistant engineer
- Angryblue – art direction, illustration, design

Guest musicians

- Jamey Jasta (Hatebreed) – vocals on "The Beast"
- Bruce LePage (100 Demons) – vocals on "Nightman"
- Kyle Chard (Born Low) – vocals on "Jonestown"

== Charts ==
| Chart (2010) | Peak position |
|---|---|
| US Billboard 200 | 67 |
| US Independent Albums (Billboard) | 6 |
| US Top Hard Rock Albums (Billboard) | 8 |
| US Top Rock Albums (Billboard) | 21 |
| US Indie Store Album Sales (Billboard) | 22 |
