= Fabián Martínez Siccardi =

Argentine writer (born 1964)

Fabián Martínez Siccardi is an Argentine writer. He was born in Patagonia in 1964 and lived an itinerant life in his youth, traveling through Argentina, the US and Spain. His home base during this period was his grandparents’ farm in the south of Argentina, on the shores of Lake Cardiel.

He started writing fiction, and won several prizes for his short stories. In 2012 he published a YA novel titled Patagonia iluminada. This was followed by more books such as Bestias afuera (2013), which won the 2013 Clarín Novel Prize, Perdidas en la noche and Los hombres mas altos.
