= Ángela Pradelli =

Ángela Pradelli is an Argentine writer. She was born in Buenos Aires in 1959. She has written more than a dozen books, among them Las cosas ocultas, Amigas mías, Turdera and El lugar del padre. She has also published short fiction and poetry that have appeared in various anthologies. Her book of essays Libro de lectura is the chronicle of an Argentine teacher. She has received many prizes for her writing, among them the Premio Emecé de Novela (2002) for Amigas Mias and the Premio Clarín de Novela (2004) for El lugar del padre.
