= Worthy (surname) =

Worthy is a surname. Notable people with the surname include:

- Albert Worthy (1905–1978), English footballer
- Allan Worthy (born 1974), English cricketer
- Calum Worthy (born 1991), Canadian actor, writer and producer best known for his role on Austin & Ally
- Chandler Worthy (born 1993), Canadian football player
- Chris Worthy (1947–2007), Canadian ice hockey player
- Dave Worthy (1934–2004), Canadian politician
- James Worthy (born 1961), American basketball player
- Jerel Worthy (born 1990), American football player
- Phyllis Worthy Dawkins (born 1953), American academic administrator
- Rick Worthy (born 1967), American actor
- Trevor H. Worthy (born 1957), New Zealand paleozoologist
- William Worthy (1921–2014), African-American journalist and civil rights activist
- Xavier Worthy (born 2003), American football player
