= Jesus Piece (band) =

American hardcore band

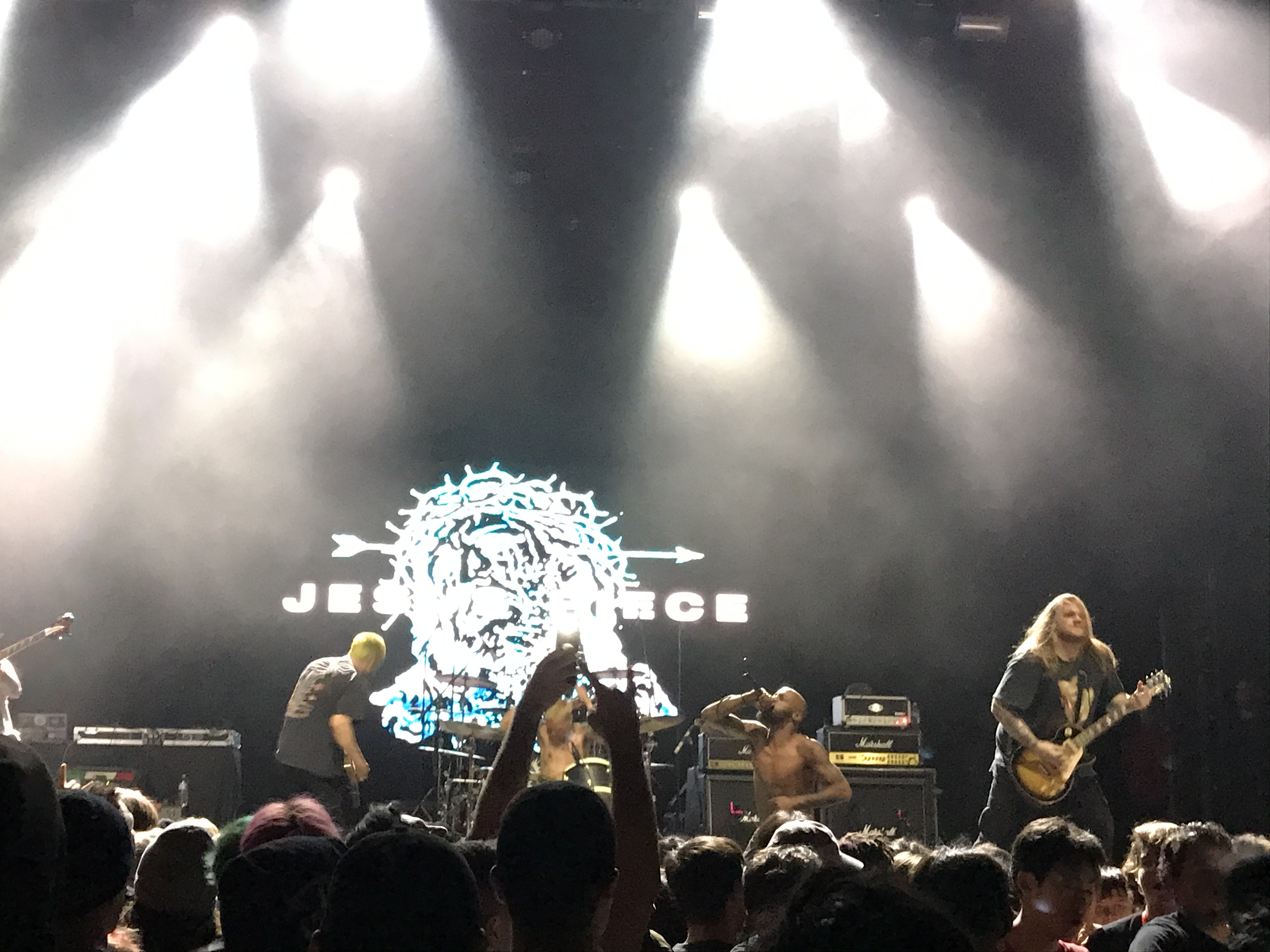
- Jesus Piece live at the Novo

Background information
- Origin: Philadelphia, Pennsylvania, U.S.
- Genres: Metalcore; beatdown hardcore; sludge metal
- Years active: 2015–2025
- Labels: Southern Lord; Century Media
- Spinoffs: Je$us Piece
- Past members: Aaron Heard; David Updike; John Distefano; Luis Aponte; Anthony Marinaro
- Website: southernlord.com/band/jesus-piece

Jesus Piece was an American metalcore band from Philadelphia, Pennsylvania, formed in 2015. The band signed to Southern Lord Records in 2018 with the release of their debut Only Self. They have since toured with acts such as Code Orange, Knocked Loose, and Ghostemane. Their second and final studio album, ...So Unknown, was released in 2023.

== History ==
The band formed in 2015 with Aaron Heard on vocals, along with guitarists David Updike and John DiStefano, bassist Anthony Marinaro and drummer Luis Aponte. They self-released their first demo/EP in the same year, followed by a self-released EP in the summer of 2016. In 2017, they did a split EP with Malice at the Palace which was released through Bridge Nine Records.

In 2018, the band signed to Southern Lord Records and released their full-length debut Only Self on August 24 of that year. In March 2020, it was announced that they would be supporting Code Orange's headlining tour along with Show Me the Body, Year of the Knife, and Machine Girl. This tour was postponed indefinitely due to the COVID-19 pandemic. In October 2022, it was announced that Jesus Piece would join Show Me the Body for the 36-date North America leg of their World War Tour.

On 5 December 2022, the band released the single "An Offering to the Night." On 20 January 2023, the band announced that their sophomore LP ...So Unknown would be released April 14 2023 via Century Media Records. This was accompanied by the release of the single "Gates of Horn." A month later, the band released another track from the upcoming album called "Tunnel Vision". Following the release of the album, Marinaro exited the band to focus full-time on running several businesses in Pottstown, Pennsylvania.

In late 2024 Jesus Piece, together with Obituary and Jinjer, joined Brazilian metal band Sepultura on the European leg of their farewell tour.

On August 26, 2025, a statement – co-signed by Updike, Distefano and Aponte – shared that "Jesus Piece has been dead for some time", confirming that the band had ended. In this statement they also noted that "anything you see associated with this name or similar playing our music and using our art is not related to anything we worked for over the last 10 years." Heard, who was not in the disbandment message, formed a spin-off band simultaneously under the moniker of Je$us Piece; they were supposed to play their debut show at One Big Party Fest in Phoenix, Arizona in October but were replaced by Show Me the Body. Heard clarified in a statement on his Instagram account that he had left Jesus Piece before the breakup announcement due to personal conflicts between himself and his bandmates; in the statement, he claimed "those men are not my friends and they haven't been for almost the entirety of us being a band". He elaborated that the band had tried to replace him multiple times, including on the European Sepultura tour, though this was disputed by his former bandmates.

== Musical style and influences ==
In an interview with CVLT Nation, Aaron Heard described the band's influences for their debut album: "anything from brutal and old school death metal to straight-up punk and hardcore influences this band. We started this band to be straight-up death metal but it evolved into what the EP was." In the same interview, when asked about the evolution of the sound compared to earlier releases, Heard explained, "We came together pretty quickly so after a few years we're finally becoming totally comfortable with what we want to do. I know we're really not trying to pull any direct influences so it's made the writing process harder but it's worth it. We just want to make unique metallic hardcore that we want to hear." Pitchfork has described the band's sound as "the nexus of hardcore, death metal, industrial, and '90s metalcore." The website also noted that the band are "part of a new metalcore movement that proves that experimentation and succinct, clobbering riffs can not only coexist, but make for natural partners." Metal Injection, meanwhile, described the band's sound as "a satisfying brutal style of hardcore that rides several lines – beatdown, slam, metalcore – while still maintaining a consistent, recognizable feel."

== Members ==
Final line-up

- Aaron Heard – lead vocals (2015–2025)
- David Updike – guitars (2015–2025)
- John Distefano – guitars (2015–2025)
- Luis Aponte – drums (2015–2025)

Former members

- Anthony Marinaro – bass, backing vocals (2015–2023)

Former touring musicians

- Alexander Cejas – bass (2023–2025)
- Ben Brodie – bass (2023)

== Discography ==
Studio albums

- Only Self (2018, Southern Lord)
- ...So Unknown (2023, Century Media)

=== EPs ===
- Jesus Piece (2016, Get This Right Records)
- 3 Song Tape (aka Summer '16 Promo) [self-released, 2016)
- Split w/ Malice at the Palace (Bridge 9 Records, 2017)

=== Singles ===
- "Curse of the Serpent" (2018, Southern Lord)
- "Neuroprison" (2018, Southern Lord)
- "Punish" (2018, Southern Lord)
- "Punish (Kilbourne Remix)" (2020, Southern Lord)
- "An Offering to the Night" (2022, Century Media)
- "Gates of Horn" (2023, Century Media)
