= Marcelo Caruso =

Argentine writer

Marcelo Caruso is an Argentine writer. He was born in Buenos Aires in 1958.

He is noted for his short stories and novels, and has won a number of prizes, among them the first prize in the Concurso Hispanoamericano de Cuento de Puebla held in Mexico, and the first prize ex aequo at the Bienal de Arte Joven de la Municipalidad de Buenos Aires. He published a short story collection titled Un pez en la inmensa noche in 1988. His debut novel Brüll (1996) was widely praised and won the Primer Premio de Novela Fortabat, was a finalist for the Premio Planeta Biblioteca del Sur and also won the Primer Premio Municipal de la Ciudad de Buenos Aires.

He won the Premio Clarin in 2019 for his novel Negro el dolor del mundo.
