= Patricia Suárez =

Argentine writer

Patricia Suárez is an Argentine writer. She was born in Rosario in 1969. She studied psychology at university. A prolific writer, she has published in many different genres: novels, short stories, poetry, plays, essays and children's books. She won the Premio Clarín de Novela for her novel Perdida en el momento. She has won many other prizes for her work.
