= Norma Huidobro =

Argentine writer

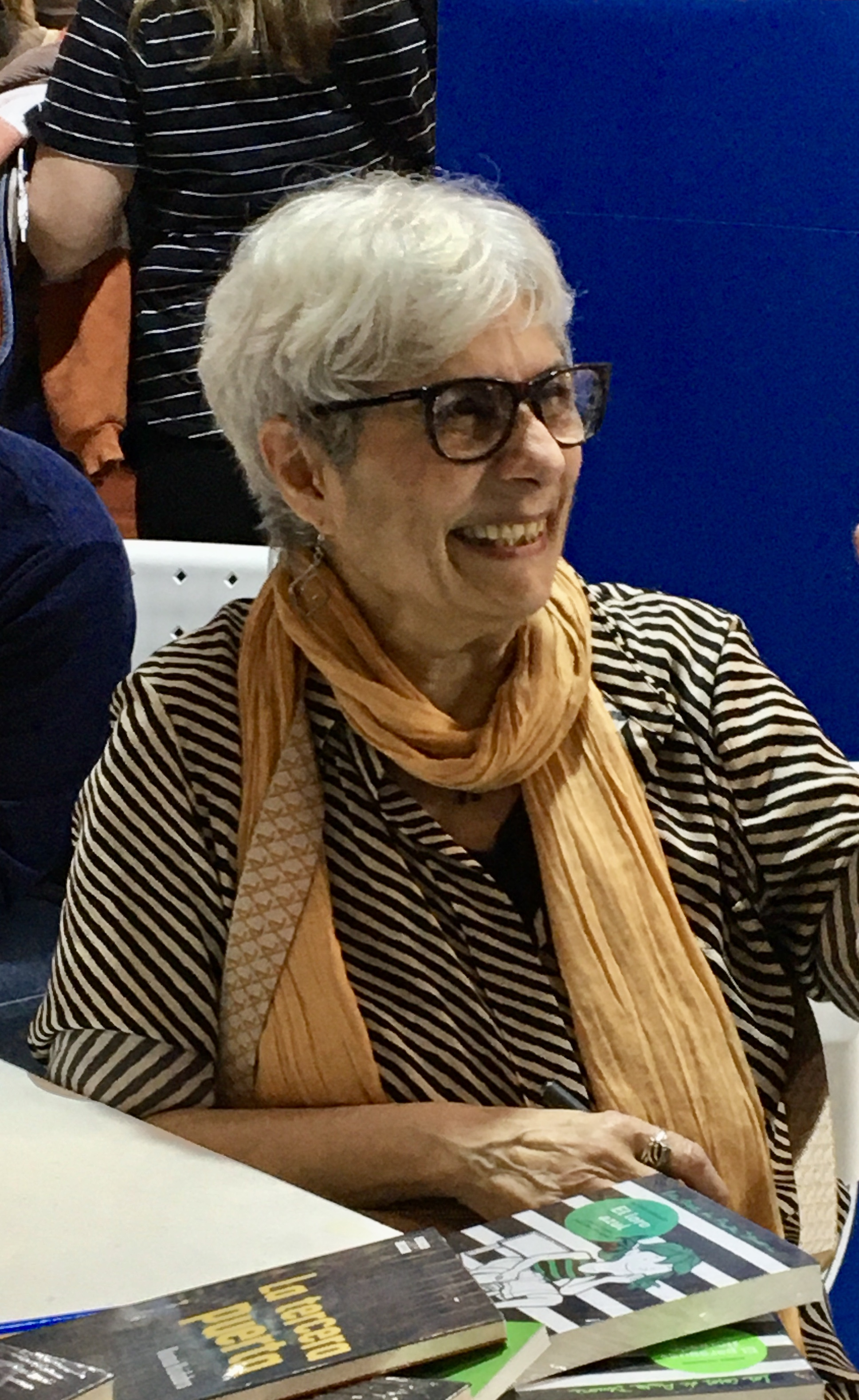
- Norma Huidobro en 2022.
- Born: 28 July 1949
- Alma mater: University of Buenos Aires
- Occupation: Writer
- Awards: Premio Clarín de Novela (2007)

Norma Huidobro is an Argentine writer, based in Lanús. She was born on July 28, 1949. She is a graduate of the University of Buenos Aires. A former teacher, she came to writing rather late, only publishing her first book ¿Quién conoce a Greta Garbo? in 2000. She has written more than 20 books, including the six-volume Anita Demare series. She won the Premio Clarin de Novela for her 2007 novel El Lugar Perdido.
