= Pablo Toledo =

Argentine writer and journalist

Pablo Toledo (born 1975) is an Argentine writer and journalist. He won the Premio Clarin de Novela in 2000 for his debut novel Se esconde tras los ojos. His second novel was titled Tangos chilangos. He has also written short stories which have been anthologized in volumes like La joven guardia (2005), In Fraganti (2007) and Uno a uno (2008). He served as culture editor at the Buenos Aires Herald newspaper.
