= Miguel Gaya =

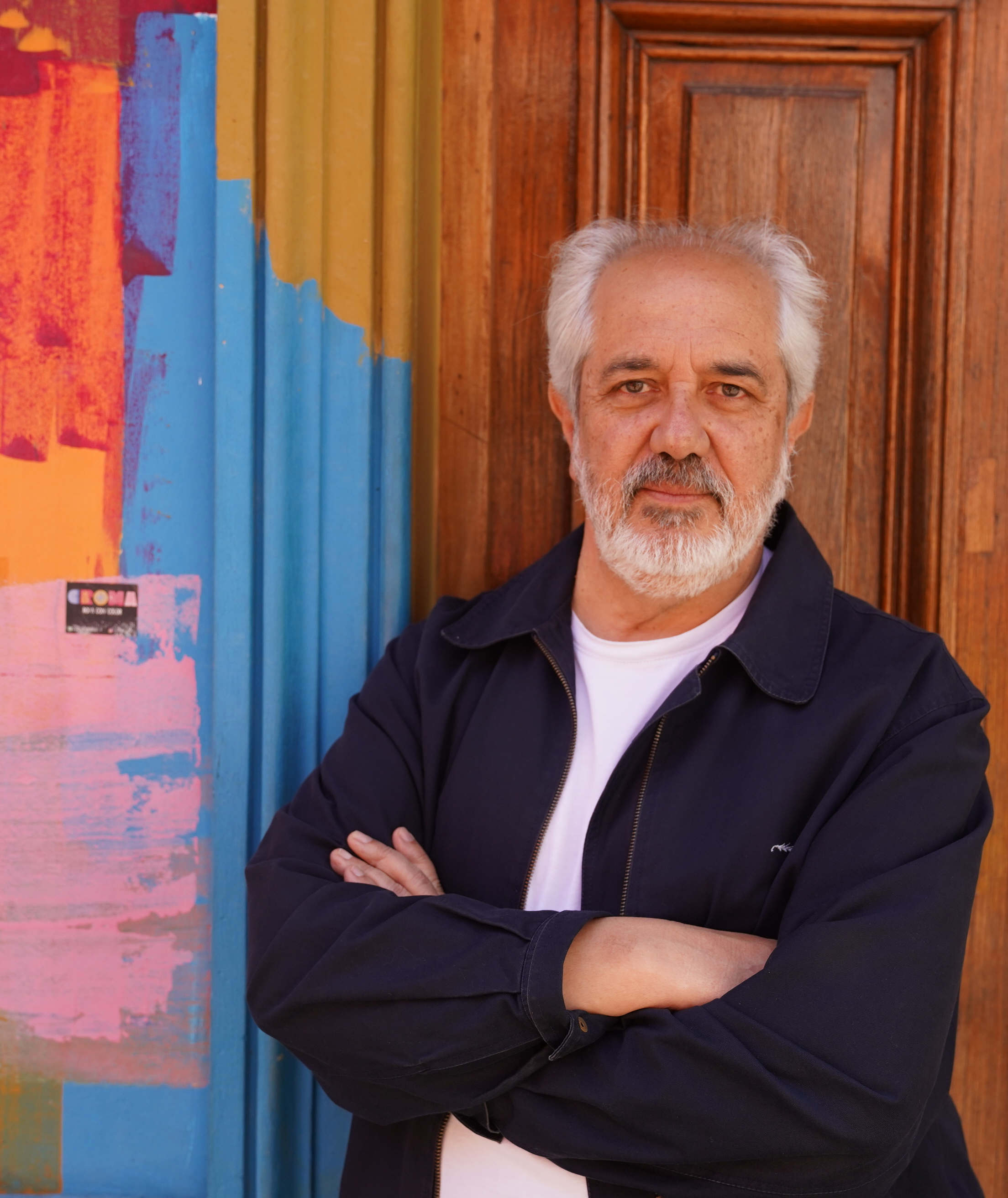
Miguel Gaya

Miguel Gaya is an Argentine poet and writer. He was born in Ayacucho, Province of Buenos Aires, in 1953.

Trained as a lawyer, he joined the Grupo Onofrio de Poesía Descarnada in 1979, together with Javier Cófreces and Jonio González. He was a member of the Editorial Committee of the poetry magazine La Danza del Ratón, from 1981 to 2001 and editor of Ediciones en Danza since 2001. He has published many books of poetry:

- La vida secreta de los escarabajos de la playa (1982)
- Levanta contra el viento la cabeza oscura (1983)
- Colección Robin Hood (1994)
- Siluetas en la corriente del río (2000)
- Los poetas Salvajes (2003)
- Lo efímero y otros poemas inestables (2009)
- Mediterráneo (2011).

His poems have appeared in many anthologies, among them:

- 65 poetas por la vida y la libertad (Abuelas de Plaza de Mayo, Bs. As. 1981)
- Una antología de la poesía argentina (1970-2008) (2008)
- 200 años de poesía argentina (2010).

He started writing fiction only in his 40s. Among his novels are:

- Contemplar ese animal sangriento (2008)
- Una pequeña conspiración (2012)
- Las hormigas argentinas conquistan el mundo (2020).

In 2022, he won the Premio Clarin de Novela for his novel El desierto invisible.
