= Coma Witch =

Studio album by the Acacia Strain
- Released: October 14, 2014
- Recorded: March 11 – April 14, 2014
- Studio: Machine Shop, Jersey City, New Jersey / The Jungle Studios, Mesa, Arizona
- Genre: Metalcore; deathcore
- Length: 64:22
- Label: Rise
- Producer: Will Putney

The Acacia Strain chronology
Death Is the Only Mortal (2012)	Coma Witch (2014)	Gravebloom (2017)

Singles from Coma Witch
- 1. "Cauterizer" Released: August 12, 2014; 2. "Nailgun" Released: September 24, 2014; 3. "VVorld Demise" Released: October 3, 2014

Professional ratings
Review scores
Source	Rating
MetalSucks	3.5/5 stars
PopMatters	9/10
Revolver	3.5/5

Coma Witch is the seventh studio album by American metalcore band The Acacia Strain. It was released on October 14, 2014, through Rise Records. It is the band's first album to feature new guitarists Devin Shidaker and Richard Gomez, and the first album to not feature original guitarist Daniel "DL" Laskiewicz due to his departure from the band in May 2013. It is also the band's final album to feature bassist Jack Strong prior to his departure in May 2015.

== History ==
On May 20, 2013, it was announced that original and longtime guitarist Daniel "DL" Laskiewicz would be departing the band. He was replaced by guitarists Devin Shidaker (ex-Oceano) and Richard Gomez (ex-Molotov Solution).

On January 13, 2014, the band announced they would begin recording their upcoming album in March, which would be produced by Will Putney from Fit for an Autopsy. The band completed recording the album on April 17.

On August 12, the band revealed the upcoming title of the album to be Coma Witch, which is set for release on October 14. The band also released the music video for the first single of the album, "Cauterizer".

== Track list ==
All music is composed by The Acacia Strain.

Disc 1
No.	Title	Length
1.	"Human Disaster"	3:46
2.	"Cauterizer"	3:19
3.	"Send Help" (featuring Max Cavalera of Soulfly)	3:26
4.	"Holy Walls of the Vatican"	3:23
5.	"World Demise" (featuring Brendan Garrone of Incendiary)	3:02
6.	"Nailgun"	4:26
7.	"Graveyard Shift" (featuring Sven de Caluwé of Aborted)	3:48
8.	"Bridgepainter"	3:47
9.	"Whale Shark"	3:19
10.	"Delusionalisphere"	4:34
Total length:		36:50

Disc 2
No.	Title	Length
1.	"Observer"	27:32
Total length:		27:32

== Personnel ==
The Acacia Strain

- Vincent Bennett – lead vocals
- Devin Shidaker – lead guitar, programming, backing vocals
- Richard Gomez – rhythm guitar
- Jack Strong – bass
- Kevin Boutot – drums

Production

- Produced, Mixed & mastered by Will Putney
- Engineered by Will Putney, Randy Leboeuf & Tom Smith, Jr
- Editors: Randy Leboeuf & Tom Smith Jr.
- Additional artists: Sven Avernus & Abra Bigham
