= Worthy Book =

Malaysian coupon-book brand

- Company type: Private limited company
- Industry: Voucher, Marketing, Publishing
- Founded: 2010
- Headquarters: Kuala Lumpur, Malaysia
- Key people: Han Jia; (Co-founder); Ken Kho; (Co-founder)
- Parent: Worthy Media Sdn Bhd

Worthy Book is a Malaysian coupon-book brand held by Worthy Media. It is based in Kuala Lumpur, Malaysia.

Worthy Book was released in September 2010 by Han Jia and Ken Kho and have become well known for voucher booklets offering various discounts throughout Kuala Lumpur. The company has expanded to serve a large number of brands in Malaysia, such as Kenny Rogers, Guardian, and The Body Shop.

Outside of the business, the company has received praise from non-governmental organizations such as AIESEC for their focus on corporate social responsibility. They have attracted various forms of media coverage, such as radio and TV coverage.

== History ==
Worthy Book was released by Han Jia and Ken Kho in September 2010. Since then, the company has expanded to serve a large number of brands in Malaysia.

In 2012, the company expanded its voucher offerings, including F&B and female-focused offerings.

== Distribution Model ==
Much like other advertising and coupon companies, Worthy Book charges merchants for advertising and prospective vendors of Worthy Book pay for the book via a subscription fee.

== See also ==
- Coupon
- Voucher
