= Agustina Caride =

Argentine writer

Agustina Caride (born 1970, in Buenos Aires) is an Argentine writer. She studied literature at University of Buenos Aires. In addition to being a writer, she is a literary proofreader, teaches reading and writing workshops and, together with Agustina Bazterrica, she coordinates the Bazterrica-Caride literary circle. She has written several books, including Cuentos con historia (Ediciones Lea, 2011), Testigos invisibles (Vestales, 2017) and No habrá sino ausencias (Letras del Sur, 2020).

Her novel Donde rumba el silencio won the Clarín Novel Award in 2021, taking the AR$700,000 cash prize.
