= The Acacia Strain =

American metalcore band

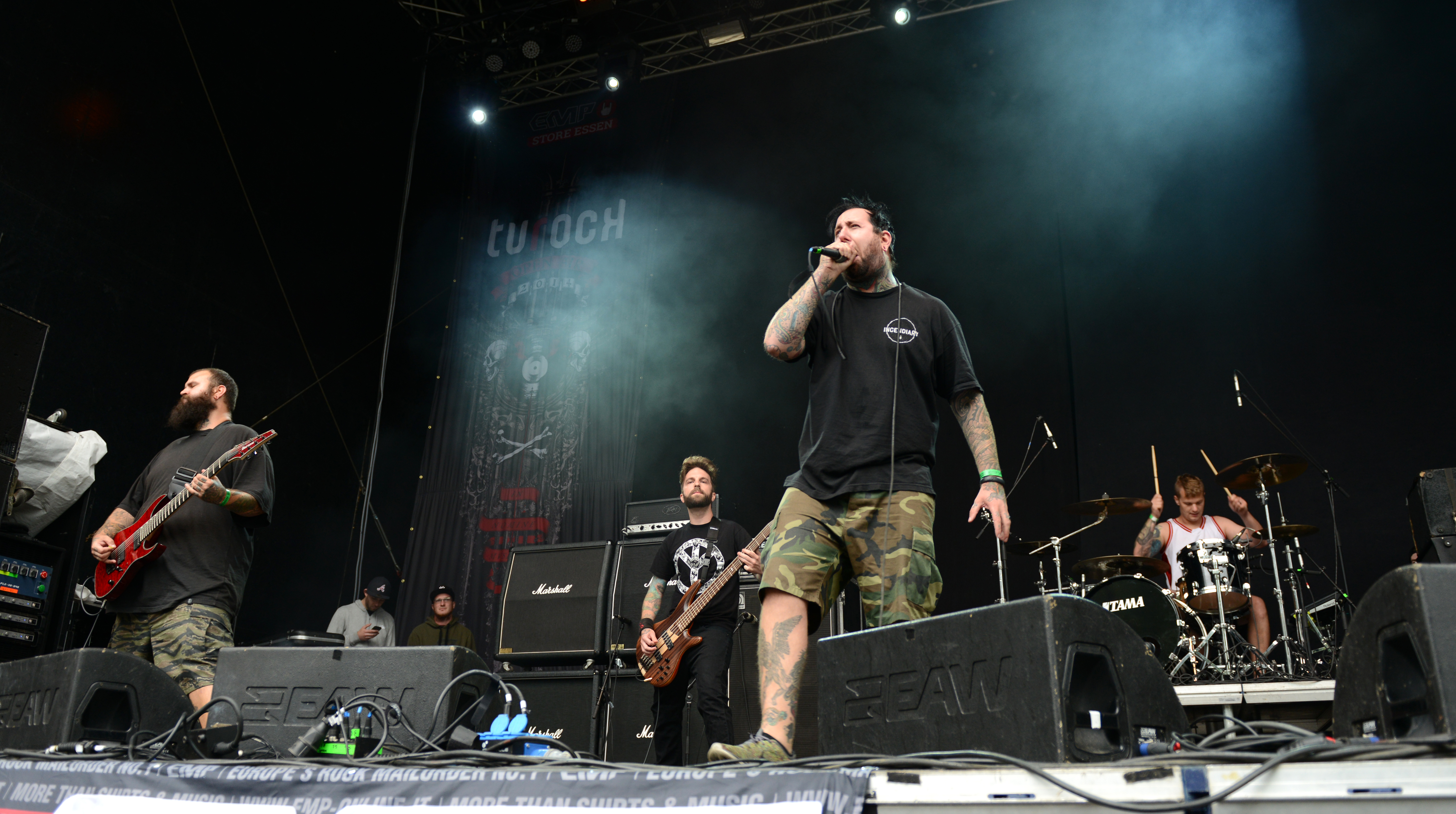
- The Acacia Strain in 2014

Background information
- Origin: Chicopee, Massachusetts, U.S.
- Genres: Metalcore; deathcore
- Years active: 2001–present
- Labels: Rise; Closed Casket Activities; Prosthetic; Devil's Head
- Members: Vincent Bennett; Devin Shidaker; Griffin Landa; Mike Mulholland; Matt Guglielmo
- Past members: Daniel "DL" Laskiewicz; Christopher Daniele; Daniel "Outhouse" Daponde; Karrie Whitfield; Jeanne Sagan; Seth Coleman; Ben Abert; Kevin Boutot; Jack Strong; Richard Gomez; Tom Smith Jr.

The Acacia Strain is an American metalcore band that was founded in 2001 and originally based in Chicopee, Massachusetts, but now based in Albany, New York. The group is currently signed to Rise Records and initially consisted of high school friends Vincent Bennett, Christopher Daniele, and Ben Abert, Karrie Whitfield, Daniel "DL" Laskiewicz, and Daniel Daponde joining shortly after. They recorded and released their debut album ...And Life Is Very Long in 2002 via Devil's Head records. The band has released thirteen full-length albums throughout their tenure.

== History ==
=== Beginnings (2001-2007) ===
Vocalist Vincent Bennett is the only remaining original member

The Acacia Strain was formed in 2001 by high school friends Vincent Bennett (vocals), Christopher Daniele (guitar), and Ben Abert (drums). These three then recruited mutual friend Karrie Whitfield and fellow student Daniel "DL" Laskiewicz to play bass and guitar, respectively. The group began playing local shows in their home state of Massachusetts and recorded their demo in 2001. Around this time, Laskiewicz suffered a shoulder injury while playing football, leading to Bennett asking friend and future Blood Has Been Shed guitarist Daniel Daponde to fill in on guitar while Laskiewicz recovered. Following his recovery, the band decided to keep Daponde as an official member, leading to the band having a three guitar lineup. Following multiple shows, The Acacia Strain was signed with Toby Dutkiewicz (brother of Adam Dutkiewicz) label Devil's Head records. The group then recorded their debut album …And Life Is Very Long at Zing recording studio in Westfield, Massachusetts with Adam Dutkiewicz and Jim Fogarty, releasing it later that year.

Karrie Whitfield left the band in 2003 and was briefly replaced by Jeanne Sagan for touring duties before Seth Coleman became the band's permanent bass player in 2004. In June of that year, it was announced the band had signed with Prosthetic Records to release their second album, 3750; the group once again worked with Adam Dutkiewicz at Zing Studios. Following the album's release, the band toured alongside acts such as August Burns Red, Bury Your Dead and Terror. Throughout the summer of 2005, the group toured alongside Between the Buried and Me, and by October of that year, it was announced that the band were working on a follow up to 3750. On June 13, 2006, their third studio album The Dead Walk was released, once again produced by Dutkiewicz. It became their first to reach the Billboard charts, peaking at number 40 on the Heatseekers and 47 on the Independent albums chart. Following the album's release, the band toured alongside Caliban, Through The Eyes of The Dead, Darkest Hour and Job For A Cowboy. They also made appearances at New England Metal and Hardcore Festival, the Saints and Sinners festival and CMJ 2006. In 2007, The Acacia Starin supported Hatebreed on both their European and U.S. legs of their spring tour. During the summer, they took part in The Sounds of The Underground tour, but they had to cancel dates in August due to Bennett being bitten by a spider. They then supported All That Remains on a US tour in the Fall. In November, Unholy guitarist Jonathan Dennison joined the band.

=== Breakthrough (2008-2013) ===
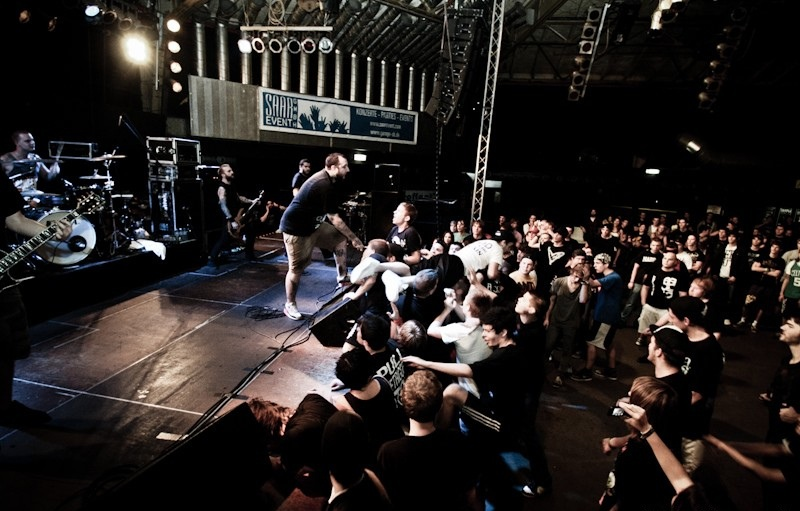
The Acacia Strain in Saarbrücken, Germany 2010

During the Summer 2008, The Acacia Strain toured North America with Darkest Hour. They then held a European headlining tour with support from Knights Of The Abyss and Annotations Of An Autopsy. On August 19, their fourth album Continent was released, becoming their first to reach the Billboard 200, debuting at number 107. It also reached number 2 on the Heatseekers chart, selling 5,600 copies in its first week. The group supported the album on with multiple tours, including one with Unearth, along with playing their first shows in Australia alongside Parkway Drive and Suicide Silence. In early 2009, the band toured the US alongside Bleeding Through and As Blood Runs Black. On April 7, they won the MySpace Readers Choice Award at the inaugural Epiphone Revolver Golden Gods Awards. During the summer, they headlined a US tour, and then toured alongside August Burns Red throughout September and October.

In April 2010, The Acacia Strain entered the studio to record their fifth studio album alongside producer Zeuss. The album Wormwood was released on July 10, and debuted at number 67 on the Billboard 200, selling 6,300 copies in its first week. In the fall of that year, the band held a US headlining tour with support from The Red Chord, Terror, Gaza and The Contortionst. In early 2011, the group supported Whitechapel on their North American tour. The live album The Most Known Unknown, originally recorded at the Worcester Palladium in 2008, was released on June 21, 2011. Later that year, the band headlined the "God Damn" tour alongside Terror.

After playing multiple club gigs opening for Lamb of God in early 2012, it was announced the band had signed with Rise Records to release their next album. Death is the Only Mortal was produced by guitarist Daniel Laskiewicz and was released on October 9, selling 8,600 copies in its first week and debuting at number 50 on the Billboard 200. The band had to drop off the following tour with Veil of Maya due getting into a car accident. In early 2013, the band toured North America alongside Every Time I Die and Vanna. In May, the band announced that they had parted ways with Laskiewicz after multiple years of him not touring with the group and only being a writing and recording member. In June, Devin Shidaker and Richard Gomez joined as guitarists.

=== Coma Witch, Gravebloom, and It Comes in Waves (2014-2020) ===
In April 2014, it was announced The Acacia Strain had finished recording their next studio album. Coma Witch was later released on October 9, and became the band's highest-charting album to date. It peaked at number 31 on the Billboard 200, sold 9,400 copies in its first week, and topped the US Hard Rock chart. Following this, the band embarked on a co-headlining North American tour alongside Emmure in the fall. While on the tour, the band's van was hit by a drunk driver; none of the band members were in the vehicle when the accident happened. During spring 2015, the group supported The Ghost Inside on their "Out of Control tour". They also took part in The Summer Slaughter Tour and toured Europe in the fall supporting Northlane. During the Summer Slaughter Tour, it was reported that bass player Jack Strong was not with the band; he was then replaced by Griffin Landa.

By March 2016, the group began working on their next album. During the summer they headlined a North American tour, with Knocked Loose and Oceano serving as support. On March 17, 2017, they released the single "Bitter Pill." Their eighth studio album Gravebloom was released on June 30, selling 5,100 copies in its first week and debuting at number 146 on the Billboard 200. In December, the group headlined an Australian tour with Kublai Khan serving as main support. The group spent much of 2018 touring supporting Hatebreed on their Perseverance and Satisfaction Is the Death of Desire anniversary tour, headlining US tours in spring and summer, and co-headlining a fall tour with After the Burial.

Touring continued into 2019 as the group supported Knocked Loose on a spring North American tour, headlined a summer tour with Kublai Khan and Judiciary, and supported Chelsea Grin on their fall tour. On December 26, the group released their ninth studio album It Comes in Waves. In March 2020, the band canceled multiple dates of their North American headlining tour with Rotting Out due to the COVID-19 pandemic. On July 24, the group released their 10th studio album Slow Decay. The songs on the album were all released as six two-track singles, the first five of which were released in the months leading up to the album's release with one-letter titles spelling out the word "DECAY". The album sold 12,000 copies sold within a week after its release, peaking at number 87 on the Billboard 200.

=== Step Into The Light, Failure Will Follow, and You Are Safe from God Here (2021-present) ===
On August 28, 2021, the band took part in a one-off show at the Palladium in Worcester, Massachusetts with The Ghost Inside, Every Time I Die, Currents, and Great American Ghost. During the fall, the group returned with their own headlining tour with Kublai Khan and Harms Way, where they played It Comes In Waves in its entirety. Guitarist Tom Smith left the band in March 2022 due to burnout. The group then headlined tours in both the summer and September.

In February 2023, The Acacia Strain announced that they would release Step Into The Light on May 12 and on March 16; they would also be releasing Failure Will Follow on the same day, both through Rise Records. Vocalist Vincent Bennett explained the decision to release two albums on the same day: "Why not just do a big long record? Well, they are legitimately two separate records - written and recorded separately. One being a fast and hard ass beater, the other a slow, sad, emotional rollercoaster." The group then embarked on separate US and Canada tours with Fit for an Autopsy. In July, longtime drummer Kevin Boutot suddenly left the band due to wanting to spend more time with his family, being replaced by Matt Guglielmo. In September, the group embarked on an Australian tour with Dying Wish, then supported Dying Fetus on their fall US tour.

In early 2025, The Acacia Strain supported Paleface Swiss on their UK / Europe tour. During the summer the group headlined a US tour with Bodysnatcher, Ingrown, No Cure and Tribal Gaze serving as supporting acts. On July 18, the group released the single "A Call Beyond" and announced their 13th studio album You Are Safe from God Here would be released on October 24. On December 13 and 14, the group held their own holiday festival called "Tune Low Die Slow", which took place at Empire Live in Albany, New York.

In June 2026, the band toured in celebration of The Dead Walk's 20th anniversary, playing it in its entirety. During the fall, they will be supporting Whitechapel on their 20th anniversary tour.

== Artistry ==
=== Musical style ===
The Acacia Strain's music has been primarily described as deathcore and metalcore, and has been noted to include heavy influences from sludge, doom metal and death metal along with some punk rock-style aesthetic and sensibilities.

AllMusic characterizes the band's musical style as "utiliz[ing] a bone-crushing rhythm section, apocalyptic samples, and a unique triple-guitar assault to deliver their signature blend of hardcore punk, noise, death metal and doom metal." The site's review of Wormwood elaborates on the band's sound as "an inelegant and unstoppable juggernaut fueled by memories of the unchecked aggression unleashed on the world by the likes of Sepultura and Pantera."

Vocalist Vincent Bennett has denied that The Acacia Strain is of the "deathcore genre", going as far as expressing dislike for the label, though Bennett was later more ambivalent towards it, stating "sometimes I get it, sometimes I don't."

The Acacia Strain's influences include Candiria, Integrity, Dismember, Crowbar, Meshuggah, Hatebreed, Slayer, Arch Enemy, and Overcast.

=== Lyrics ===
Written by lead vocalist Vincent Bennett, the band's lyrics generally center around misanthropy and nihilism. Bennett employs misogynistic and sexually deviant imagery in his lyrics, but usually only as metaphors to help get his points across while keeping the songs' overall meanings open for interpretation.

== Band members ==
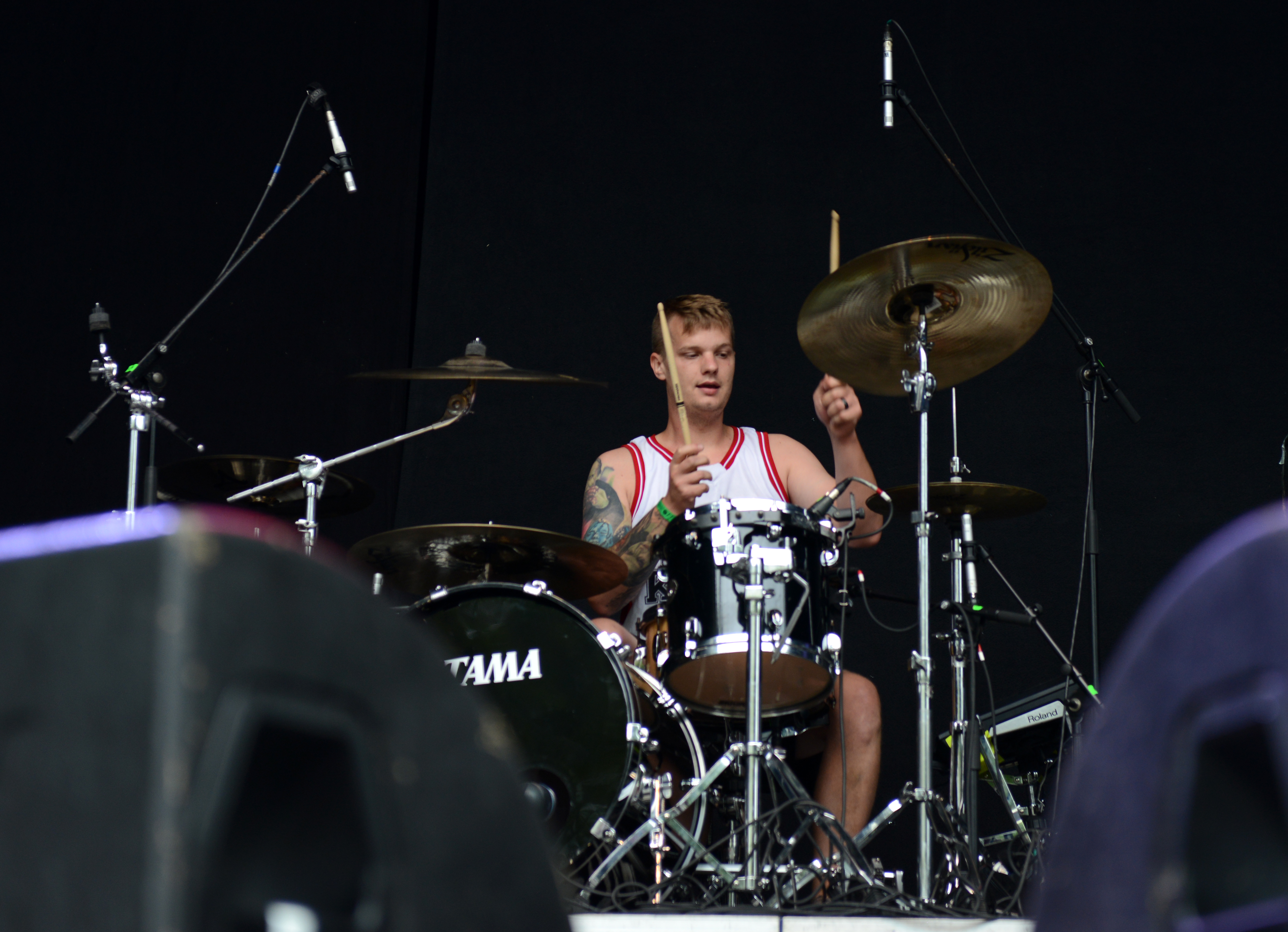
Drummer Kevin Boutot was the second-longest remaining member of the band behind vocalist Bennett.

Current

- Vincent Bennett – lead vocals (2001–present)
- Devin "Big Slime" Shidaker – lead guitar, backing vocals (2013–present)
- Griffin Landa – bass (2015–present)
- Mike Mulholland – rhythm guitar (2022–present)
- Matt Guglielmo – drums (2023–present)

Former

- Daniel "DL" Laskiewicz – lead guitar, programming, backing vocals (2001–2013); rhythm guitar (2007–2013)
- Daniel Daponde – rhythm guitar, backing vocals (2001–2006)
- Christopher Daniele – third guitar (2001–2005)
- Ben Abert – drums (2001–2004)
- Karrie Whitfield – bass (2001–2003)
- Jeanne Sagan – bass (2003)
- Seth Coleman – bass (2004–2006)
- Kevin Boutot – drums (2005–2023)
- Jack Strong – bass (2006–2015)
- Richard Gomez – rhythm guitar (2013–2016)
- Tom Smith Jr. – rhythm guitar (2016–2022)

Touring

- Mark Castillo – drums (2004)
- John Preston – bass (2003)
- David Sroka – rhythm guitar (2009)
- Mike Casavant – rhythm guitar (2009–2010)
- Tim Cavallari – lead guitar (2010–2012)
- Tony Diaz – rhythm guitar (2010–2012)
- Matt Guglielmo – drums (2018)
- Terrance Pettitt – drums (2023)

== Discography ==
=== Studio albums ===
List of studio albums, with selected chart positions
Title	Album details	Peak chart positions				
Title	Album details	US	US Heat.	US Indie.	US Rock	US Hard Rock
...And Life Is Very Long	Released: September 2, 2002; Label: Devil's Head; Formats: CD, digital download	—	—	—	—	—
3750	Released: July 13, 2004; Label: Devil's Head, Prosthetic; Formats: CD, digital download	—	—	—	—	—
The Dead Walk	Released: June 13, 2006; Label: Prosthetic; Formats: CD, digital download	—	40	47	—	—
Continent	Released: August 19, 2008; Label: Prosthetic; Formats: CD, digital download	107	2	13	—	18
Wormwood	Released: July 20, 2010; Label: Prosthetic; Formats: CD, digital download	67	—	6	21	8
Death Is the Only Mortal	Released: October 9, 2012; Label: Rise; Formats: CD, digital download	51	—	10	21	5
Coma Witch	Released: October 14, 2014; Label: Rise; Formats: CD, digital download	31	—	4	8	1
Gravebloom	Released: June 30, 2017; Label: Rise; Formats: CD, digital download	146	—	4	29	8
It Comes in Waves	Released: December 26, 2019; Label: Closed Casket Activities; Formats: CD, digital download	—	—	—	—	—
Slow Decay	Released: July 24, 2020; Label: Rise; Formats: CD, digital download	87	—	1	1	1
Step Into the Light	Released: May 12, 2023; Label: Rise; Formats: CD, digital download, vinyl	—	—	—	—	—
Failure Will Follow	Released: May 12, 2023; Label: Rise; Formats: CD, digital download, vinyl	—	—	—	—	—
You Are Safe from God Here	Released: October 24, 2025; Label: Rise; Formats: CD, digital download	—	—	—	—	—
"—" denotes a recording that did not chart or was not released in that territory.

=== Live albums ===
- The Most Known Unknown (2010)

=== EPs ===
- When Angels Shed Their Wings Volume 3 with Loyal to the Grave (2003)
- Money for Nothing (2013)
- The Depression Sessions with Thy Art Is Murder and Fit for an Autopsy (2016)

=== Singles ===
- "Jonestown" (2010)
- "Servant in the Place of Truth" (2012)
- "Above" / "Below" (2013)
- "Bitter Pill" (2017)
- "Big Sleep" (2017)
- "D" (2020)
- "E" (2020)
- "C" (2020)
- "A" (2020)
- "Y" (2020)
- "Untended Graves" (2022)
- "Fresh Bones" (2023)
- "Chain" (feat. Jacob Lilly) (2022)

=== Demos ===
- Demo 2001 (2001)
- Demo 2002 (2002)

=== DVDs ===
- The Most Known Unknown (2010)

== Music videos ==
- "Smoke Ya Later" (2004)
- "3750" (2005)
- "Angry Mob Justice" (2006)
- "Skynet" (2009)
- "The Hills Have Eyes" (2010)
- "The Impaler" (2011)
- "Cauterizer" (2014)
- "Send Help" (2015)
- "One Thousand Painful Stings" (2020)
