= Agustina Bazterrica =

Argentine writer (born 1974)

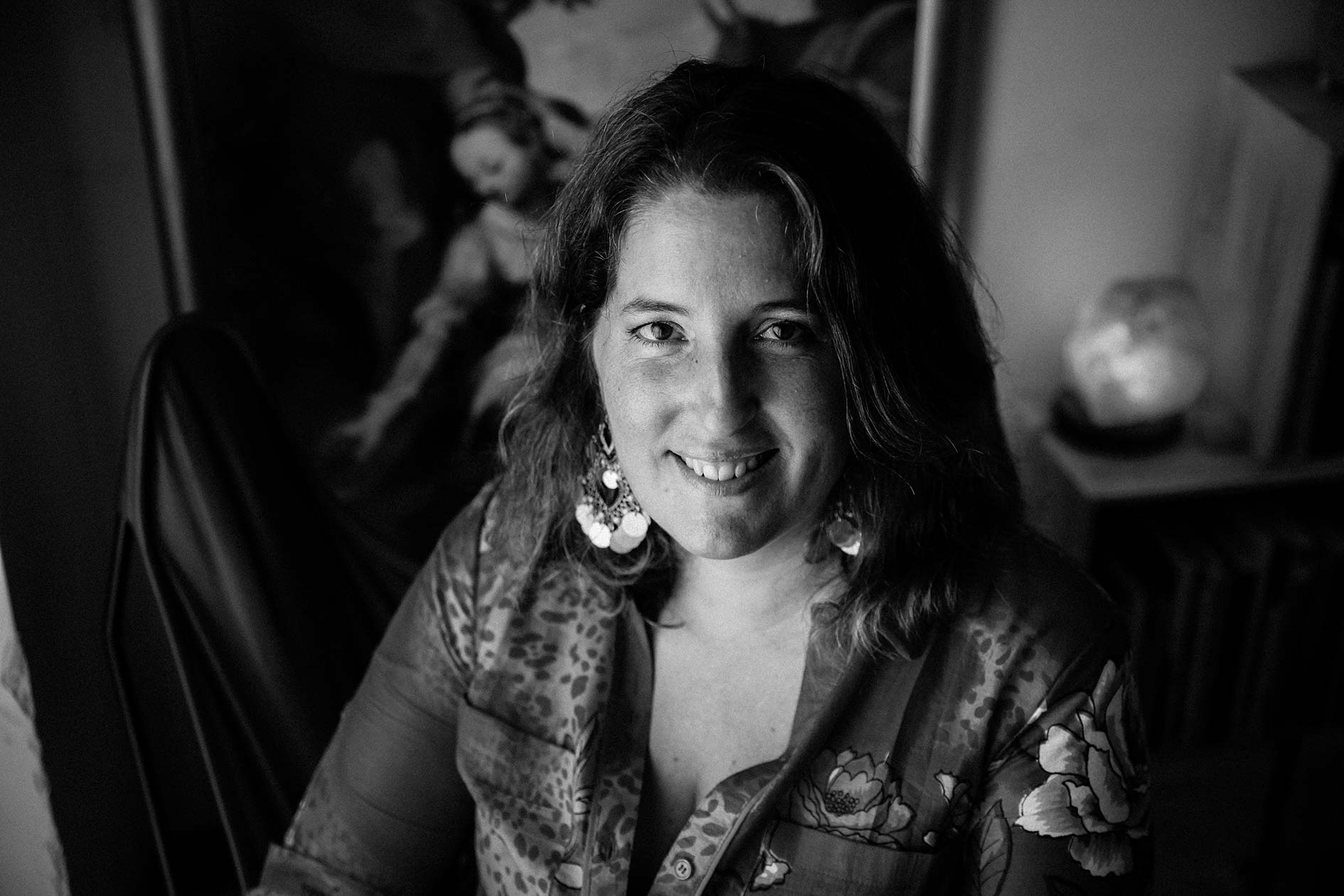
- Bazterrica in 2018
- Born: 1974 (age 51–52); Buenos Aires, Argentina
- Writing career
- Language: Spanish
- Genre: Horror fiction
- Notable works: Tender Is the Flesh; The Unworthy
- Notable awards: 2017 Premio Clarín de Novela

Agustina Bazterrica (born 1974) is an Argentine writer. She is noted for her short stories and her novels, and she has won multiple literary prizes.

== Life and career ==
She was born in Buenos Aires, and studied fine arts at the University of Buenos Aires.

Her book Cadáver exquisito won the 2017 Clarín Novel Prize and the 2020 Ladies of Horror Fiction Award for Best Novel, for the latter being the only winner not originally written in English. It has been translated into a number of languages, including in English under the title Tender Is the Flesh.

She co-curated the art event series Siga al Conejo Blanco and she runs reading and writing workshops with fellow writer Agustina Caride.

In 2023, her novel Las Indignas was published; it was translated into English by Sarah Moses as The Unworthy.

== Awards and honors ==
Year	Work	Award	Category	Result	Ref.
2017	Cadáver Exquisito (Tender is the Flesh)	Premio Clarín de Novela	—	Won	
2020	Cadáver Exquisito (Tender is the Flesh)	Goodreads Choice Awards	Horror	Finalist	
2020	Cadáver Exquisito (Tender is the Flesh)	Ladies of Horror Fiction Award	Novel	Won	
2026	Las indignas (The Unworthy)	Andrew Carnegie Medal	Fiction	Shortlisted	
2026	Las indignas (The Unworthy)	Locus Award	Translated Novel	Finalist	

== Works ==
=== Novels ===
- Matar a la niña. Textos Intrusos. March 13, 2013. ASIN B0DLT8NMKB.
- Antes del encuentro feroz. Alción Editora. January 1, 2016. ISBN 9789876466455.
- Las cajas de Unamuno. Audiocuentos de la Nueva Narrativa Argentina. January 1, 2017. ASIN B0DM2G4QNB.
- Cadáver exquisito [Tender Is the Flesh]. Translated by Sarah Moses. Alfaguara. November 29, 2017. ISBN 9788420433424.
- Las indignas [The Unworthy]. Translated by Sarah Moses. Alfaguara. December 5, 2023. ISBN 9798890980137.

=== Collections ===
- Diecinueve garras y un pájaro oscuro [Nineteen Claws and a Black Bird]. Translated by Sarah Moses. Alfaguara. August 1, 2020. ISBN 9789877387094.

=== Short stories ===
- In Sangre Fría (PelosDePunta, 2016)
- In El nuevo cuento argentino: Una antología (EUFyL, 2017)
- In Revista Próxima 37 (Ediciones Ayarmanot, 2018)
- In Cuerpo (Anfibia Papel, 2019)
