= Ignacio Arabehety =

Argentine lawyer

Ignacio Arabehety is an Argentine lawyer and writer. He was born in Alta Gracia, Córdoba, on April 29, 1966. He graduated from the Colegio Nacional de Monserrat in 1983 and moved to Buenos Aires at the age of nineteen. He studied law at the University of Buenos Aires. In addition, he studied cinema at different academies, and participated in various literary workshops. His debut novel Asomados al pozo won the 2020 Clarín-Alfaguara Award.
