= Continent (The Acacia Strain album) =

Studio album by The Acacia Strain
- Released: August 19, 2008
- Recorded: April 13 – May 15, 2008
- Studio: Planet Z Studios (Hadley, MA)
- Genre: Metalcore; deathcore
- Length: 40:23
- Label: Prosthetic
- Producer: The Acacia Strain; Zeuss

The Acacia Strain chronology
The Dead Walk (2006)	Continent (2008)	Wormwood (2010)

Singles from Continent
- 1. "Skynet" Released: January 31, 2009

Professional ratings
Review scores
Source	Rating
AllMusic	2.5/5 stars
Alternative Press	4/5
Blabbermouth.net	7.5/10
MetalSucks	3/5

Continent is the fourth studio album by the American metalcore band The Acacia Strain. Recorded and mixed at Planet Z Studios in Hadley between April 13 and May 15, 2008, it was released on August 19, 2008 via Prosthetic Records. Produced by Zeuss and the band themselves, it features a guest appearance from Ringworm's Human Furnace.

In the United States, the album debuted at number 107 on the Billboard 200, number 18 on the Top Hard Rock Albums, number 13 on the Independent Albums and number 2 on the Heatseekers Albums charts with first-week sales of almost 5,600 copies.

The album marks the first with bassist Jack Strong and second with drummer Kevin Boutot in the band's revamped line-up. Frontman Vincent Bennett also spoke to MTV News about the release, saying it was the band's "darkest" effort to date.

In 2018, the album was re-released for streaming services and included bonus tracks that were previously only available on limited edition vinyl.

In September 2018, The Acacia Strain began a 10-year anniversary tour with After the Burial, Erra and Make Them Suffer, where The Acacia Strain played the record in full.

In 2024, Metal Injection included the album in their list of "10 Deathcore Albums That Aged Incredibly Well".

== Controversy ==
An Internet rumor circulated stating that lyrics on the first track, "Skynet", were written about the band Emmure and how they have allegedly ripped off The Acacia Strain, although vocalist Vincent Bennett has denied this on stage numerous times. Regardless, Emmure responded to plagiarism claims in their song "R2DEEPTHROAT" from their 2009 album Felony.

== Track listing ==
All tracks are written by Vincent Bennett and Daniel Laskiewicz.

No.	Title	Length
1.	"Skynet"	4:22
2.	"Seaward"	4:15
3.	"Dr. Doom"	2:26
4.	"Forget-Me-Now"	2:43
5.	"Cthulhu"	3:27
6.	"Baby Buster" (featuring Human Furnace)	4:18
7.	"Balboa Towers"	4:36
8.	"JFC"	2:56
9.	"Kräken"	2:41
10.	"The Combine"	2:02
11.	"The Behemoth"	6:37
Total length:		40:23

Bonus tracks
No.	Title	Length
12.	"Global Warming"	2:54
13.	"Stay Puft"	3:15

== Personnel ==
The Acacia Strain

- Vincent Bennett – vocals
- Daniel Laskiewicz – guitar
- Jack Strong – bass
- Kevin Boutot – drums

Additional

- James "Human Furnace" Bulloch – vocals (track 6)
- Christopher "Zeuss" Harris – producer, engineering, mixing
- Alan Douches – mastering
- Paul Romano – art direction, artwork, design

== Charts ==
Chart (2008)	Peak position
US Billboard 200	107
US Top Hard Rock Albums (Billboard)	18
US Independent Albums (Billboard)	13
US Heatseekers Albums (Billboard)	2
