= Eduardo Belgrano Rawson =

Argentine writer

Eduardo Belgrano Rawson is a writer born in 1943 in San Luis, Argentina. He has published several novels and a collection of short stories.

== Career ==
In 1961 at the age of 18, Belgrano Rawson moved to Buenos Aires to study film. As well as studying cinema he became a journalist and wrote screenplays and 'historietas', (a type of Argentine comic which was popular at the time) under a pseudonym.

He published his first novel "No se turbe vuestro corazón" in 1974 and "El náufrago de las estrellas" in 1979. He then made a series of journeys to Tierra del Fuego on foot and horseback over the next decade. These were to influence his next work "Fuegia", a novel published in 1991 which tells the story of a family of indigenous people who inhabited the area at the beginning of the 20th century.

He has been awarded several prizes in his native Argentina and his works have been published in Latin America, Spain, Italy, Germany, France and the UK.

== Work ==
- 1974 "No se turbe vuestro corazón" (novel).
- 1979 "El náufrago de las estrellas" (novel).
- 1991 "Fuegia" (novel).
- 1998 "Noticias secretas de América" (novel).
- 2001 "Setembrada" (novel).
- 2005 "Rosa de Miami" (novel).
- 2006 "El mundo se derrumba y nosotros nos enamoramos" (short stories).

Published in English as "Washing Dishes in Hotel Paradise" by Hesperus Press, 2010.
