= Fernando Monacelli =

Argentine writer and journalist

Fernando Monacelli is an Argentine writer and journalist. He was born in 1966 in Bahía Blanca. He studied at the Universidad Católica Argentina. He is the editor the Bahia Blanca newspaper La Nueva Provincia.

Among his notable works are the short story collection Libro de vuelo (1993) and the novel La mirada del ciervo (2008), which was a finalist for the Clarín-Alfaguara Prize in 2005 and for the La Nación-Sudamericana Prize in 2006.

His novel Sobrevivientes was the unanimous winner of the Premio Clarin de Novela in 2012, chosen by a jury consisting of Juan Cruz Ruiz, Claudia Piñeiro and Santiago Roncagliolo.
