= Cristina Feijóo =

Argentine writer

Cristina Feijóo is an Argentine activist and writer. She was born in 1944 in Buenos Aires. She was a left-wing activist in her youth, and was persecuted by the military junta who jailed her repeatedly in the 1970s. In 1979 she went to exile in Sweden with her only daughter. Her story collection En celdas diferentes appeared in 1992. She received the Premio Clarin de Novela for her book Memorias del río inmóvil (2001).
