= José Niemetz =

Argentinian writer

José Niemetz (born 1962) is an Argentinian writer. He studied literature at the Universidad Nacional de Cuyo. He continued his studies at the Facultad Latinoamericana de Ciencias Sociales (FLACSO). He teaches literature at the Universidad Champagnat, and he also owns a bookshop called Había una vez (Once Upon a Time).

His debut novel Tú eres para mí won the Premio Clarín de Novela.
