= Worthy Hotel =

- U.S. National Register of Historic Places
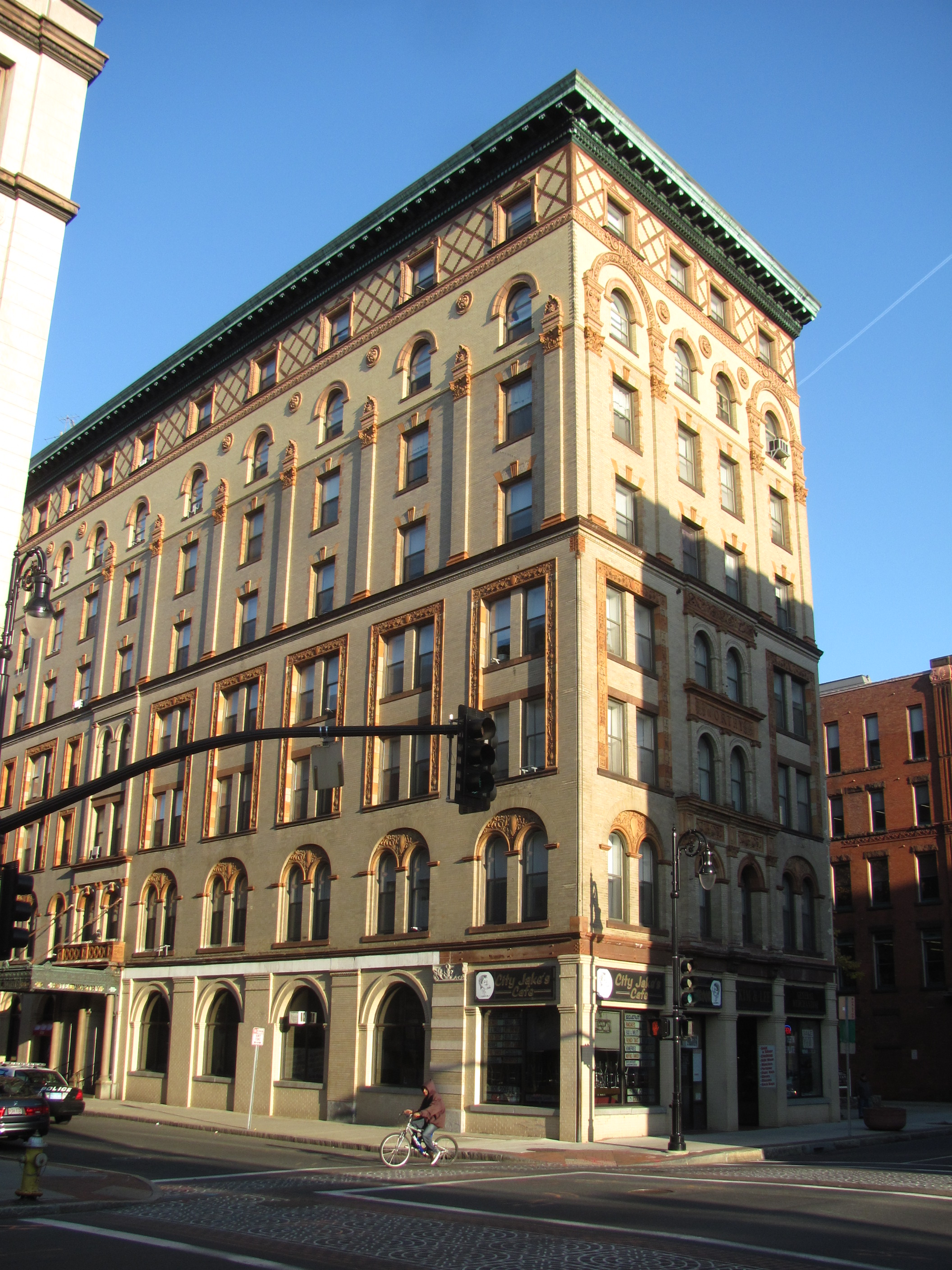

- Location within Massachusetts Location within the United States
- Location: 1571 Main St., Springfield, Massachusetts
- Coordinates: 42°6′13″N 72°35′34″W
- Area: less than one acre
- Built: 1895
- Architect: Gardner, Pyne & Gardner
- Architectural style: Renaissance Revival
- MPS: Metro Center Springfield MRA
- NRHP reference No.: 83000779
- Added to NRHP: February 24, 1983

The Worthy Hotel is an historic hotel at 1571 Main Street in Springfield, Massachusetts. Built in 1895 and advertised as "Springfield's leading commercial and tourist house," the Worthy Hotel was Springfield's finest hotel until the opening of the Hotel Kimball in 1911. Located only two blocks south of Springfield Union Station and featuring 250 rooms, the Worthy Hotel's period of greatest significance was from 1895-1925. It was added to the National Register of Historic Places on February 24, 1983. It is historically significant not only for its commerce but for its Renaissance Revival architecture. Currently, the Worthy Hotel is an apartment building.

== Description and history ==
The former Worthy Hotel building is located in downtown Springfield, at the southeast corner of Main and Worthington Streets. It is an eight-story masonry structure, with a roughly L-shaped plan that extends south to North Church Avenue at the rear. It is Romanesque in style, with a variety of window trims and styles, including a number of round-arch windows typical of the style. The building is crowned by a projecting dentillated cornice. The section at the rear is a second building, which was merged into the main building and given a stylistically unifying facade treatment.

The hotel was built in 1895 by Justin Worthy, and was the city's first steel-framed fireproof building. Located near the city's railroad station, it served business travelers, and had a restaurant that was judged one of the best in the city. Originally built with six floors and 50 rooms, it was raised to eight floors in 1905, and enlarged again with the acquisition of the 1896 Mayo building in 1909. The latter enlargement included creating a common facade, and filling in an alley separating the buildings as part of the combined structure.

In 1929, Arthur D. Buckley, owner of the Winthrop Hotel in Meriden, Connecticut, managed the hotel.

== See also ==
- National Register of Historic Places listings in Springfield, Massachusetts
- National Register of Historic Places listings in Hampden County, Massachusetts
