= Worthy.com =

Online liquidation marketplace for pre-owned luxury goods

Worthy
- Company type: Online marketplace
- Founded: 2014; 12 years ago
- Headquarters: New York, New York, United States
- Area served: United States
- CEO: Steven Schneider
- Services: Luxury Good Reseller, Appraisal
- Website: www.worthy.com

Worthy.com is an online liquidation marketplace for pre-owned goods including diamonds, watches, and diamond jewelry. Worthy is headquartered in New York City and was founded by investment banker Ben De-Kalo in 2014.

== What Worthy Does ==
Worthy is an online auction platform. Sellers send their jewelry to Worthy headquarters for appraisals, GIA grading.

== History ==
Worthy.com was launched in May 2014. The company got its start when De-Kalo and his wife wished to sell a diamond necklace in order to put the money from its sale toward a new one. The De-Kalos found that their resale options were limited. De-Kalo saw an opportunity to create an online auction platform in which sellers send their items to the company's headquarters in New York for evaluation, after which goods would be auctioned online to a network of pre-selected professional buyers.

The marketplace itself is solely online, with the availability of walk-ins for the item submission stage. Goods offered for resale are also physically evaluated and stored offline during the auction process. It is distinguished from other online auction marketplaces by its evaluation process and guarantees offered to both buying and selling parties.

== Online auction platform ==
In an interview published in Forbes in November 2016, Ben De-Kalo describes Worthy.com as a “consumer-to-business” auction liquidation website. Worthy.com offers an online auction platform for selling pre-owned diamond jewelry, loose diamonds, and watches. The company first identifies the market value of the item through an automatic pricing engine and then agrees on a reserve price with the sellers. The diamonds sold at Worthy.com are graded at the Gemological Institute of America (GIA) or at the International Gemological Institute (IGI). The brand-named watches are authenticated at CentralWatch. Once the auction finishes, if the final offer is above the reserve price, the deal is closed. According to former Worthy.com CEO, Ben De-Kalo, about 85% of the auctions at Worthy.com are closed successfully.
