= Pedro Mairal =

Argentine writer

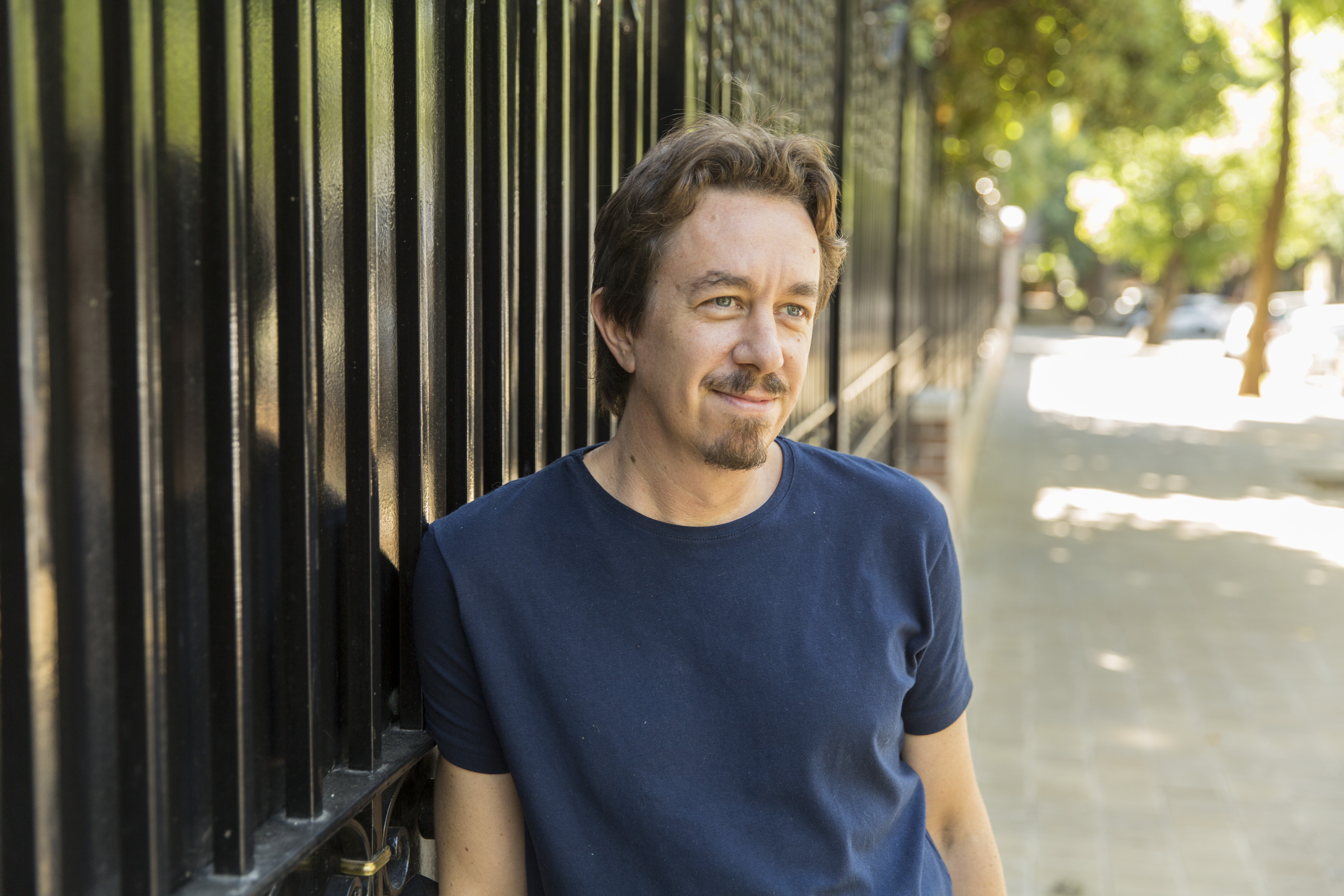

Pedro Mairal (born 1970) is an Argentine novelist, poet and musician. He has published more than a dozen books, among them the novel La Uruguaya (English translation: The Woman from Uruguay) which won the Tigre Juan Award in 2017. His work has been translated into French, German, Arabic, English and Dutch. In 2007, he was named as one of the Bogota39, a selection of the best young writers in Latin America. He also is part of the Generation of 90, with other Argentine writers such as Fabián Casas, Santiago Vega, Samanta Schweblin and Selva Almada.

== Biography ==
Pedro Mairal was born in Buenos Aires, Argentina, on September 27, 1970. He began studying medicine in 1989, but soon stopped. In 1991 he began studying language and literature at the Universidad del Salvador (Argentina). He published his first poems in the literary supplement of La Prensa in 1994. He is an adjunct professor of English literature at the Universidad del Salvador.

== Selected works ==
- Una Noche con Sabrina Love (in Spanish). 1998. ISBN 9789507820380.
- Hoy Temprano (in Spanish). 2001. ISBN 9789507821462.
- El Año del Desierto (in Spanish). 2005. ISBN 9789871180226.
- El Gran Surubí (in Spanish). 2013. ISBN 9788415525028.
- The Missing Year of Juan Salvatierra. 2013. ISBN 9781939931061.
- El Subrayador (in Spanish). 2014. ISBN 9789569450020.
- El Cepillo del Rey [The King's Brush] (in Spanish). 2017. ISBN 9789500758307.
- Maniobras de Evasión [Evasion Maneuvers] (in Spanish). 2017. ISBN 9789500438889.
- Pornosonetos (in Spanish). 2018. ISBN 9789500439596.
- La Uruguaya [The Woman from Uruguay] (in Spanish). 2019. ISBN 9781984899071.
- Breves Amores Eternos (in Spanish). 2019. ISBN 9788423356287.
- El Rap de Los Gatos. 2020. ISBN 9789874743978.
- Salvatierra (in Spanish). 2021. ISBN 9789877672312.
- Esta Historia ya no está Disponible (in Spanish). 2022. ISBN 9789500441865.
