= Tender Is the Flesh =

2017 novel by Agustina Bazterrica

- First edition
- Author: Agustina Bazterrica
- Original title: Cadáver exquisito
- Translator: Sarah Moses
- Language: Spanish
- Genre: Horror fiction; dystopian fiction; science fiction
- Published: 29 November 2017
- Publisher: Clarín Group; Alfaguara
- Publication place: Argentina
- Pages: 249 (first edition)
- Award: Premio Clarín de Novela 2017
- ISBN: 9789870737940

Tender Is the Flesh (Spanish: Cadáver exquisito) is a dystopian novel by Argentine author Agustina Bazterrica. The novel was originally published in Spanish in 2017 and translated by Sarah Moses into English in 2020. Tender Is the Flesh portrays a society in which a virus has contaminated all animal meat. Because of the lack of animal flesh, cannibalism becomes legal. Marcos, a human meat supplier, is conflicted by this new society, and tortured by his own personal losses.

== Plot summary ==
The world has changed after the "Transition", caused by a global pandemic that killed all edible animals while not affecting humans. Due to the resulting lack of animal meat products, people either had to go vegan or start eating each other. Under pressure of the meat industry which did not want to lose its business model, the second option won out and cannibalism became institutionalized, industrialized, and normalized. Humans bred for consumption are referred to as "heads", their meat marketed as "special meat". Scavengers, who cannot afford "special meat", consume any dead body available.

Marcos, despite his moral objections, works at a slaughterhouse to support his dementia-ridden father. He is a middle man who purchases "heads" and then sells the products. Marcos, who became estranged from his wife, Cecilia, after the death of their infant son, has an affair with a local female butcher. His sister, Marisa, contributes nothing to the care of their father.

One day, a client sends Marcos a female as a gift. Not wanting to slaughter her, Marcos keeps her in his house. Although copulating with a "head" is illegal, he begins a sexual relationship with her, naming her Jasmine. Jasmine eventually becomes pregnant.

When Marcos's father dies, Marcos scatters his ashes in the now-abandoned zoo which they had visited together when he was a child. He then attends a "farewell party" Marisa is hosting for their father, but leaves after being served an arm from a domestic "head" that Marisa is keeping alive.

Marcos comes home to find Jasmine in labor. He calls Cecilia, a nurse, to come and help deliver the baby. Jasmine gives birth to a boy, which Marcos claims as his and Cecilia's. Marcos knocks Jasmine out and carries her to the barn to slaughter her. Cecilia protests, stating that Jasmine could give them more children. Marcos closes by saying "she had the human look of a domesticated animal".

== Main characters ==
- Marcos Tejo: Right-hand man to the owner of the most reputable meat processing plant; he is in charge of daily operations and the supply and distribution of human meat (also called "special meat").
- Jasmine: A human bred for consumption and given to Marcos. She is the mother of Marcos's second son.
- Don Armando: Marcos's father. He has dementia and lives in a nursing home.
- Cecilia: Marcos's estranged wife. She and Marcos communicate mostly over the phone.
- Marisa: Marcos's sister. Obsessed with status and climbing social ladders, Marisa uses her dead father's wake to show off her human meat accessories.

== Critical reception ==
Tender Is the Flesh was a winner of Argentina's Premio Clarín de Novela prize and was praised by several critics.

The New York Times Book Review's Daniel Kraus described the novel as "powerful" in displaying the monstrosities and desires of the hierarchical structure of capitalism. Kraus also identified that replacing pigs with humans completely alters the view within the novel of industrialized farming. Justine Jordan of The Guardian saw the landscape of the novel as similar to Argentine author Samanta Schweblin's novel Fever Dream. Jordan described Tender Is the Flesh as "vampiric", "provocative" and "sorrowful". Headstuff's David Tierney highlighted the use of dark humor as complementing the novel's darkness and horror. Tierney also identified the main weakness of the novel as Bazterrica babying the reader, with the book improving considerably when this restraint is relaxed.

Scholars such as Megan Todd analyze various ways in which the novel serves as an allegory. Todd in particular described Bazterrica's novel as a metaphor for the politics of exploitation in neoliberal capitalism. Sebastian Williams argues that the novel challenges a traditional humanist conceptualization of Self (as an autonomous, discrete subject), especially regarding the permeable boundaries between the individual and their environment (i.e., what humans consume; the diseases humans contract). Williams also notes that Bazterrica foregrounds broader cultural anxieties about zoonotic diseases; disease is never simply a material fact, but is embedded in cultural narratives that define politics, ethics, and so forth. Grace Sielinski of The Michigan Daily writes in an article about extreme and splatterpunk novels that have attained mainstream coverage and praise:

Bazterrica's goal for the novel was more than just to make audiences squirm in their seats. Using the metaphor of literal state-sponsored cannibalism, Tender is the Flesh is about the horrors of capitalism, and how ignoring the savagery of our current system just leads to more viciousness. All of the tricks that make the typical gory book unremarkable turn this one into a potent gut punch.

== See also ==
- Cannibalism in literature
- Cannibalism in popular culture
