= Leopoldo Brizuela =

Argentine journalist, writer and translator (1963–2019)

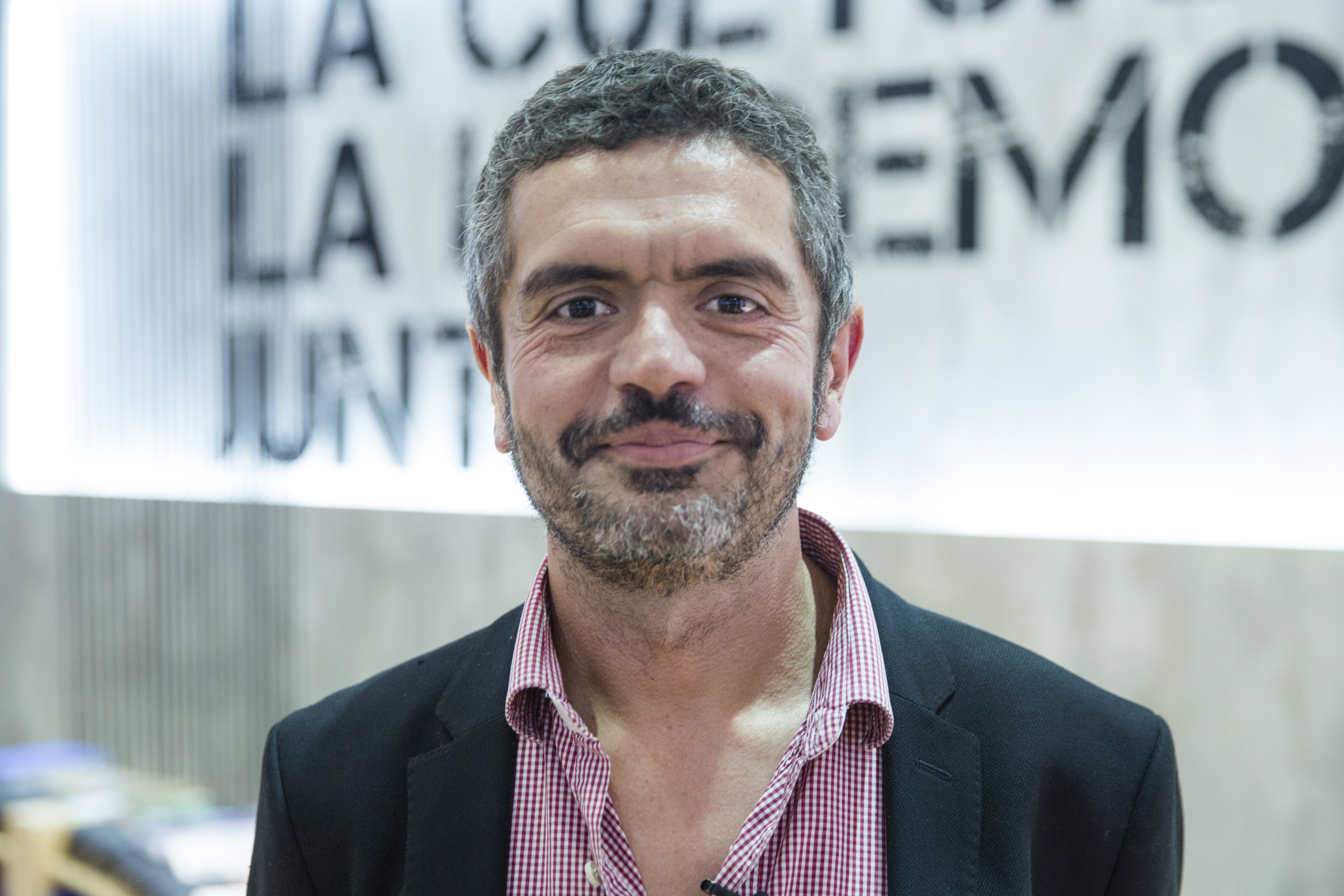

Leopoldo Brizuela (June 8, 1963 – May 14, 2019) was an Argentine journalist, writer, and translator. He was born in La Plata in 1963.

Brizuela received multiple literary awards, including the 2012 Premio Alfaguara for his novel Una misma noche. As a translator, he worked on the writings of American authors such as Henry James, Flannery O'Connor, and Eudora Welty.

== Personal life and death ==
He was openly gay.

Leopoldo Brizuela died as a result of a long illness at the age of 55 on May 14, 2019.

== Works ==
- 1985 – Tejiendo agua, novela, Emecé, Buenos Aires
- 1987 – Cantoras, reportajes a Gerónima Sequeida y Leda Valladares; Torres Agüero Editor, Buenos Aires
- 1992 – Cantar la vida, conversaciones con las cantantes Mercedes Sosa, Aimé Paine, Teresa Parodi, Leda Valladares y Gerónima Sequeida; El Ateneo, Buenos Aires
- 1995 – Fado, poemas, La Marca, Buenos Aires
- 1999 – Inglaterra. Una fábula, novela, Alfaguara
- 2001 – El placer de la cautiva, nouvelle
- 2002 – Los que llegamos más lejos, relatos, Alfaguara, Buenos Aires
- 2010 – Lisboa. Un melodrama, novela, Alianza
- 2012 – Una misma noche, novela, Alfaguara

== Prizes ==
- Premio Fortabat de Novela 1985 por Tejiendo agua
- Primer Premio Edelap de Cuento 1996
- Premio Clarín de Novela 1999 por Inglaterra. Una fábula
- Premio Municipal Ciudad de Buenos Aires para el bienio 1999–2000 por la novela Inglaterra. Una fábula (2001)
- Beca de la Fundación Calouste Gulbenkian de Lisboa (2001)
- Beca de la Fundación Antorchas (2002)
- Beca del Banff Center for the Arts (Canadá, 2002)
- Premio Konex 2004, Diploma al Mérito en la categoría Cuento: quinquenio 1999-20037
- Premio Alfaguara de Novela 2012 por Una misma noche
