= Gravebloom =

Studio album by the Acacia Strain
- Released: June 30, 2017
- Recorded: June 2016
- Studio: Graphic Nature Studios
- Genre: Metalcore; deathcore
- Length: 47:51
- Label: Rise
- Producer: Will Putney

The Acacia Strain chronology
Coma Witch (2014)	Gravebloom (2017)	It Comes in Waves (2019)

Singles from Gravebloom
- 1. "Bitter Pill" Released: March 27, 2017

Gravebloom is the eighth studio album by American metalcore band the Acacia Strain. It was released on June 30, 2017, through Rise Records, making it the group's third album for the label. Recording sessions took place at Graphic Nature Studios in June 2016. Produced by the band themselves together with Will Putney, it features guest appearances from Kobayashi Hiroyuki of Loyal to the Grave, Louis Benjamin Falgoust II of Goatwhore, Matt Honeycutt of Kublai Khan, and Rob Fusco of Most Precious Blood. The album marks the first album with bassist Griffin Landa replacing Jack Strong due to his departure in May 2015.

In the United States, the album peaked at number 146 on the Billboard 200, number 29 on the Top Rock Albums, number 8 on the Top Hard Rock Albums and number 4 on the Independent Albums charts.

== Critical reception ==
Professional ratings
Aggregate scores
Source	Rating
Metacritic	62/100
Review scores
Source	Rating
AllMusic	3/5 stars
Distorted Sound	7/10
Exclaim!	7/10
Metal Hammer	3/5 stars
MetalSucks	2.5/5
Rock Sound	6/10
Sputnikmusic	2.8/5

Gravebloom was met with generally favorable reviews from music critics. At Metacritic, which assigns a normalized rating out of 100 to reviews from mainstream publications, the album received an average score of 62 based on five reviews.

Joe Smith-Engelhardt of Exclaim! stated: "while this album isn't likely to draw in a lot of new listeners, it's a well-crafted record that provides a fresh soundtrack of ultra heavy, doom-based brutality".

In mixed reviews, AllMusic's James Christopher Monger wrote: "fans that feasted on the band's seven previous outings and enjoyed the minerally aftertaste will likely rate Gravebloom a success, as it descends as deep or deeper into the abyss, but those with more curious palates should probably bring some snacks". Jack Rogers of Rock Sound wrote: "it doesn't deviate much from the well-worn blueprint that the band have stuck to throughout their career, but when your music is this deliciously punishing why would you change?". Sputnikmusic editor called the album "fun", also finding it "a rehash, plain and simple. Nothing done across its eleven tracks hasn't been done on previous Acacia Strain records".

== Track listing ==
All tracks are written by the Acacia Strain.

No.	Title	Length
1.	"Worthless"	4:22
2.	"Plague Doctor" (featuring Kobayashi Hiroyuki)	3:18
3.	"Bitter Pill"	3:12
4.	"Big Sleep" (featuring Matt Honeycutt)	3:19
5.	"Gravebloom" (featuring Rob Fusco)	3:32
6.	"Abyssal Depths"	3:51
7.	"Model Citizen"	3:05
8.	"Calloused Mouth"	4:10
9.	"Dark Harvest" (featuring Ben Falgoust)	4:02
10.	"Walled City"	5:46
11.	"Cold Gloom"	9:14
Total length:		47:51

== Personnel ==
- The Acacia Strain – songwriters, producers
  - Vincent Bennett – lead vocals
  - Devin Shidaker – lead guitar, programming, backing vocals
  - Tom Smith Jr. – rhythm guitar, backing vocals
  - Griffin Landa – bass
  - Kevin Boutot – drums
- Kobayashi Hiroyuki – vocals (track 2)
- Matt Honeycutt – vocals (track 4)
- Rob Fusco – vocals (track 5)
- Louis Benjamin Falgoust II – vocals (track 9)
- Will Putney – producer, engineering, mixing, mastering
- Randy LeBoeuf – engineering
- Steve Seid – engineering
- Justin Kamerer – art direction, design, illustration

== Charts ==
Chart (2017)	Peak position
US Billboard 200	146
US Top Rock Albums (Billboard)	29
US Top Hard Rock Albums (Billboard)	8
US Independent Albums (Billboard)	4
