= Carlos Bernatek =

Argentine writer

Carlos Bernatek is an Argentine writer. He was born in Avellaneda, Buenos Aires in 1955. He lived in Santa Fe for more than 20 years, and published his first texts. He is the author of many novels, among them:

- La pasión en colores (1994) – finalist for the Planeta Prize
- Rutas argentinas (2000)
- Un lugar inocente (2001)
- Rencores de provincia 2008) – First Prize from the National Endowment for the Arts (Argentina)
- Banzai (2011)

His novel El canario won the Clarín-Alfaguara Novel Award in 2016. Between 2015 and 2019, he published his Santa Fe Trilogy: La noche litoral (2015), Jardín primitivo (2017) and El hombre de cristal (2019).

He also wrote the short story collections Larga noche con enanos (1998) and 'Voz de pez' (2003).

He has held various positions with cultural organizations at the national level and for the city of Buenos Aires and the province of Santa Fe. He currently works at the National Library.
