= List of 2023 albums =

The following is a list of albums, EPs, and mixtapes released in 2023. These albums are (1) original, i.e. excluding reissues, remasters, and compilations of previously released recordings, and (2) notable, defined as having received significant coverage from reliable sources independent of the subject.

See 2023 in music for additional information about bands formed, reformed, disbanded, or on hiatus; for deaths of musicians; and for links to musical awards.

== First quarter ==
=== January ===
List of albums released in January 2023
Go to: January | February | March | April | May | June | July | August | September | October | November | December | Back to top
Release date	Artist	Album	Genre	Label	Ref.
January 1	Fireworks	Higher Lonely Power		Funeral Plant Collective	
January 4	SixTones	Koe		Sony Music Japan	
January 6	Anti-Flag	Lies They Tell Our Children	Punk rock	Spinefarm	
January 6	Fred Hersch and Esperanza Spalding	Alive at the Village Vanguard	Jazz	Palmetto	
January 6	Iggy Pop	Every Loser	Alternative rock	Gold Tooth Records, Atlantic	
January 6	Nicole Dollanganger	Married in Mount Airy			
January 6	RuPaul	Black Butta		RuCo Inc.	
January 6	YoungBoy Never Broke Again	I Rest My Case	Hip-hop, rage, trap	Motown, Never Broke Again	
January 9	03 Greedo	Free 03			
January 13	Ahab	The Coral Tombs		Napalm	
January 13	Belle and Sebastian	Late Developers	Indie pop	Matador	
January 13	Billy Nomates	Cacti	Electronic, rock	Invada Records	
January 13	Circa Waves	Never Going Under		Lower Third, PIAS	
January 13	Gaz Coombes	Turn the Car Around		Hot Fruit Recordings, Virgin	
January 13	James Yorkston, featuring Nina Persson and The Second Hand Orchestra	The Great White Sea Eagle	Baroque pop	Domino	
January 13	Joesef	Permanent Damage	Pop soul	AWAL	
January 13	Margo Price	Strays		Loma Vista	
January 13	Molly	Picturesque	Dream pop, post-rock, shoegaze	Sonic Cathedral	
January 13	Obituary	Dying of Everything	Death metal	Relapse	
January 13	Rozi Plain	Prize		Memphis Industries	
January 13	VV	Neon Noir		Heartagram Records, Universal, Spinefarm	
January 17	Back Number	Humor		Universal Music Japan	
January 17	Ryuichi Sakamoto	12	Electronic, minimal	Milan	
January 18	Boysgroup	We are Boysgroup		WACK	
January 18	The Cro-Magnons	Mountain Banana			
January 18	Hiroyuki Sawano	V	Pop, pop rock	Sacra Music	
January 20	Andrew Cyrille	Music Delivery/Percussion	Free jazz	Intakt	
January 20	The Bad Ends	The Power and the Glory	Alternative pop, college rock	New West	
January 20	Biig Piig	Bubblegum	Alternative pop	RCA	
January 20	Boldy James & RichGains	Indiana Jones		Boldy James & RichGains	
January 20	Brainiac	The Predator Nominate	Synth-punk, lo-fi	Touch and Go	
January 20	Ella Hooper	Small Town Temple			
January 20	Fran	Leaving		Fire Talk Records	
January 20	Guided by Voices	La La Land	Art punk, indie rock	Guided by Voices Inc.	
January 20	Hardy	The Mockingbird & the Crow	Country, nu metal	Big Loud	
January 20	Ice Spice	Like..?	Drill	10K	
January 20	John Cale	Mercy		Domino, Double Six	
January 20	July Talk	Remember Never Before	Alternative rock	Six Shooter	
January 20	Kali Malone featuring Stephen O'Malley and Lucy Railton	Does Spring Hide Its Joy	Drone	Ideologic Organ	
January 20	Katatonia	Sky Void of Stars	Progressive rock, progressive metal	Napalm	
January 20	Ladytron	Time's Arrow	Electronic, pop rock	Cooking Vinyl	
January 20	Låpsley	Cautionary Tales of Youth			
January 20	Lukas Graham	4 (The Pink Album)		Warner	
January 20	Måneskin	Rush!	Pop rock, hard rock	Epic	
January 20	Mac DeMarco	Five Easy Hot Dogs	Instrumental rock	Mac's Record Label	
January 20	The Murder Capital	Gigi's Recovery		Human Season	
January 20	New Found Glory	Make the Most of It		Revelation	
January 20	Riverside	ID.Entity		Inside Out, Mystic	
January 20	Trippie Redd	Mansion Musik	Trap, rap rock	10K, 1400 Entertainment	
January 20	We Are Scientists	Lobes	Dance-rock	100% Records	
January 23	Dave Rowntree	Radio Songs		Cooking Vinyl	
January 24	Pasocom Music Club	Depot Vol. 1			
January 25	ALI	Music World		Sony Music Japan	
January 25	Ayumi Hamasaki	Remember You	J-pop	Avex Trax	
January 25	Kevin Morby	Music from Montana Story			
January 25	Monkey Majik	Curtain Call		Binyl Records	
January 25	Suisei Hoshimachi	Specter		Hololive	
January 26	Ziggy Ramo	Sugar Coated Lies		Ramo Records	
January 27	The Arcs	Electrophonic Chronic		Easy Eye Sound	
January 27	Ava Max	Diamonds & Dancefloors	Dance-pop	Atlantic	
January 27	Aya Nakamura	DNK	Zouk, R&B	Rec. 118, Warner Music France	
January 27	Bass Drum of Death	Say I Won't		Fat Possum	
January 27	Brett Kissel	The Compass Project - South Album	Country	Big Star Recordings, ONErpm	
January 27	Deathprod	Compositions		Smalltown Supersound	
January 27	Elle King	Come Get Your Wife	Country	RCA	
January 27	Emarosa	Sting	Pop rock, synth-pop, dance-pop	Out of Line	
January 27	Fucked Up	One Day		Merge	
January 27	Gena Rose Bruce	Deep Is the Way		Dot Dash	
January 27	Kimbra	A Reckoning		Inertia Music, PIAS	
January 27	King Tuff	Smalltown Stardust		Sub Pop	
January 27	Lil Yachty	Let's Start Here	Psychedelic rock, psychedelic pop, funk	Concrete Records, Quality Control, Motown	
January 27	The Lucid	Saddle Up and Ride	Post-grunge	SpoilerHead Records	
January 27	Meg Baird	Furling	Psychedelic folk	Drag City	
January 27	Sam Smith	Gloria	Pop, R&B	Capitol	
January 27	Samia	Honey	Pop, indie rock	Grand Jury	
January 27	SG Lewis	AudioLust & HigherLove		PMR, Virgin EMI	
January 27	Sjava	Isibuko		1020 Cartel	
January 27	Tomorrow X Together	The Name Chapter: Temptation	Alternative pop, pop rock	Big Hit Music, Republic	
January 27	The Tubs	Dead Meat	Jangle pop, punk rock	Trouble in Mind	
January 27	Tyler Hubbard	Tyler Hubbard	Country	EMI Nashville, Hubbard House	
January 27	Uriah Heep	Chaos & Colour	Heavy metal, hard rock	Silver Lining Music	
January 27	White Reaper	Asking for a Ride	Garage punk, hard rock, pop rock	Elektra	
January 28	Parannoul	After the Magic	Shoegaze	Topshelf	
January 31	The Smashing Pumpkins	Atum: Act Two	Alternative rock, progressive rock	Thirty Tigers	

=== February ===
List of albums released in February 2023
Go to: January | February | March | April | May | June | July | August | September | October | November | December | Back to top
Release date	Artist	Album	Genre	Label	Ref.
February 1	Dish	Triangle			
February 1	Epik High	Strawberry	Hip-hop	OURS Co., Genie Music	
February 1	Shikao Suga	Innocent			
February 1	Uru	Contrast			
February 1	Yuki	Parade ga Tsuzukunara			
February 3	All Out War	Celestial Rot		Translation Loss Records	
February 3	Colony House	The Cannonballers			
February 3	Felip	Complex			
February 3	The Go! Team	Get Up Sequences Part Two	Indie pop	Memphis Industries	
February 3	John Frusciante	I and II	Ambient, drone	Acid Test Records	
February 3	Jonatan Leandoer96	Sugar World			
February 3	Korn	Requiem Mass			
February 3	Manu Gavassi	Acústico MTV: Manu Gavassi Canta Fruto Proibido		Universal Music Brazil	
February 3	The Men	New York City		Fuzz Club	
February 3	Mod Sun	God Save the Teen	Pop-punk	Big Noise	
February 3	Raye	My 21st Century Blues	House, pop, dancehall	Human Re Sources	
February 3	Robert Forster	The Candle and the Flame	Folk-pop	Tapete	
February 3	Shania Twain	Queen of Me	Country	Republic Nashville	
February 3	Skech185 and Jeff Markey	He Left Nothing for the Swim Back	Hip-hop	Backwoodz Studioz	
February 3	The Waeve	The Waeve		Transgressive	
February 3	Sunny War	Anarchist Gospel	Folk punk	New West	
February 3	Xandria	The Wonders Still Awaiting	Symphonic metal	Napalm	
February 3	Young Fathers	Heavy Heavy		Ninja Tune	
February 8	Flume	Things Don't Always Go the Way You Plan	Electronic	Future Classic, Transgressive	
February 8	Golden Bomber	Compact Disc			
February 8	Nano	Noixe		Nippon Columbia	
February 8	Pabllo Vittar	Noitada	Pop, hyperpop	Sony Music Brazil	
February 8	Rei Yasuda	Circle		SME Japan	
February 9	Rebecca Black	Let Her Burn	Pop, electropop, hyperpop	Rebecca Black	
February 10	The Academic	Sitting Pretty		EMI	
February 10	Andy Shauf	Norm		Anti-	
February 10	Black Belt Eagle Scout	The Land, the Water, the Sky	Indie rock, dream pop	Saddle Creek	
February 10	The Brian Jonestown Massacre	The Future Is Your Past	Psychedelic rock	A Records	
February 10	Chase Rice	I Hate Cowboys & All Dogs Go to Hell		Broken Bow, Dack Janiels Records	
February 10	Civic	Taken by Force		Cooking Vinyl Australia	
February 10	Delain	Dark Waters	Symphonic metal	Napalm	
February 10	Hope D	Clash of the Substance			
February 10	In Flames	Foregone	Melodic death metal, alternative metal	Nuclear Blast	
February 10	Kelela	Raven	R&B, ambient pop, breakbeat	Warp	
February 10	Liv.e	Girl in the Half Pearl	Alternative R&B, neo soul	In Real Life	
February 10	Narrow Head	Moments of Clarity	Alternative rock, hard rock, shoegaze	Run for Cover	
February 10	Paramore	This Is Why	Post-punk, dance-punk	Atlantic	
February 10	Pierce the Veil	The Jaws of Life	Alternative rock	Fearless	
February 10	Quasi	Breaking the Balls of History	Garage rock, sunshine pop	Sub Pop	
February 10	Tennis	Pollen	Pop	Mutually Detrimental	
February 10	Yo La Tengo	This Stupid World	Indie rock	Matador	
February 10	You Me at Six	Truth Decay	Emo	AWAL, Rise, Underdog Records	
February 14	Caroline Polachek	Desire, I Want to Turn Into You	Art pop, alternative pop, new-age	Sony Music, The Orchard, Perpetual Novice	
February 14	Kelsea Ballerini	Rolling Up the Welcome Mat	Country	Black River	
February 14	Zack Tabudlo	For All		Republic Philippines	
February 15	KAT-TUN	Fantasia		J Storm	
February 15	Leo Ieiri	Naked		Victor Entertainment	
February 15	Mao Abe	Not Unusual		Pony Canyon	
February 15	Shonen Knife	Our Best Place	Pop-punk	Good Charamel, P-Vine	
February 16	Tini	Cupido	Latin	Sony Music Latin, Hollywood	
February 17	Avatar	Dance Devil Dance	Heavy metal	Thirty Tigers	
February 17	Avey Tare	7s		Domino	
February 17	Big Scarr	The Secret Weapon		New 1017	
February 17	Celestaphone	Paper Cut from the Obit	Experimental hip-hop, jazz rap, instrumental hip-hop	Drumhex	
February 17	Code Orange	What Is Really Underneath?			
February 17	Deus	How to Replace It		PIAS	
February 17	Graphic Nature	A Mind Waiting to Die	Nu metalcore	Rude	
February 17	Inhaler	Cuts & Bruises	Indie rock	Polydor	
February 17	Jordan Davis	Bluebird Days	Country	MCA Nashville	
February 17	Levante	Opera Futura		Parlophone, Warner Music Italy	
February 17	Orbital	Optical Delusion		Orbital	
February 17	Pigs Pigs Pigs Pigs Pigs Pigs Pigs	Land of Sleeper	Stoner metal	Rocket Recordings, Missing Piece Records	
February 17	Pile	All Fiction		Exploding in Sound	
February 17	Pink	Trustfall	Dance-pop	RCA	
February 17	Screaming Females	Desire Pathway	Alternative rock, indie rock	Don Giovanni	
February 17	Skrillex	Quest for Fire	Dance-pop	Owsla, Atlantic	
February 18	Skrillex	Don't Get Too Close	Emo rap, urban pop	Owsla, Atlantic	
February 20	MSPaint	Post-American	Post-hardcore, synth-punk	Convulse Records	
February 22	Dialogue	Dialogue+2		Pony Canyon	
February 22	Lovebites	Judgement Day	Power metal	Victor	
February 22	Mameshiba no Taigun	Mamequest		Avex Trax	
February 22	Shin Jimin	Boxes		Alo Malo Entertainment	
February 22	Stray Kids	The Sound	J-pop	Epic Japan	
February 24	Adam Lambert	High Drama	Pop	BMG	
February 24	Algiers	Shook		Matador	
February 24	Christian McBride	Prime	Jazz	Mack Avenue	
February 24	The Church	The Hypnogogue	Psychedelic rock	Communicating Vessels	
February 24	Dierks Bentley	Gravel & Gold	Country	Capitol Nashville	
February 24	Don Toliver	Love Sick	R&B	Cactus Jack, Atlantic	
February 24	Dope	Blood Money Part Zer0			
February 24	Godsmack	Lighting Up the Sky	Hard rock, alternative metal	BMG	
February 24	Gorillaz	Cracker Island	Pop, synth-pop, funk	Parlophone	
February 24	Gracie Abrams	Good Riddance	Pop	Interscope	
February 24	Gruff Rhys	The Almond & the Seahorse		Rough Trade	
February 24	Karol G	Mañana Será Bonito	Reggaeton	Universal Latino	
February 24	The Lathums	From Nothing to a Little Bit More	Indie rock	Island	
February 24	Logic	College Park		BobbyBoy Records, Three Oh One Productions, BMG	
February 24	Lucero	Should've Learned by Now		Liberty & Lament, Thirty Tigers	
February 24	Miss Grit	Follow the Cyborg	Electronic, indie rock	Mute	
February 24	Philip Selway	Strange Dance	Alternative rock	Bella Union	
February 24	Shame	Food for Worms	Post-punk	Dead Oceans	
February 24	Sløtface	Awake/Asleep			
February 24	Steel Panther	On the Prowl	Glam metal, comedy rock	Steel Panther	
February 24	Tink	Thanks 4 Nothing	R&B	Winter's Diary, WD Records, Empire	
February 24	U.S. Girls	Bless This Mess	Art pop	4AD	
February 24	Yeat	Afterlyfe	Trap, rage	Twizzy Rich, Geffen, Field Trip	
February 28	Pasocom Music Club	Depot Vol. 2			
February 28	Young Nudy	Gumbo	Hip-hop, trap	Young Nudy, RCA	

=== March ===
List of albums released in March 2023
Go to: January | February | March | April | May | June | July | August | September | October | November | December | Back to top
Release date	Artist	Album	Genre	Label	Ref.
March 1	Dry Cleaning	Swampy		4AD	
March 1	Valshe	Sagas		Being Inc.	
March 3	Can't Swim	Thanks but No Thanks		Pure Noise	
March 3	Conrad Sewell	Precious		Sony Australia	
March 3	Enslaved	Heimdal	Black metal, progressive rock	Nuclear Blast	
March 3	Genesis	BBC Broadcasts	Progressive rock, pop rock, soft rock	EMI	
March 3	Haken	Fauna		Inside Out	
March 3	Jen Cloher	I Am the River, the River Is Me		Milk!	
March 3	Kali Uchis	Red Moon in Venus	R&B	Geffen, EMI	
March 3	Kate NV	Wow		RVNG Intl.	
March 3	Macklemore	Ben	Hip-hop	Bendo, ADA	
March 3	Masego	Masego		EQT Recordings, Capitol	
March 3	Mimi Webb	Amelia	Pop	Epic	
March 3	Morgan Wallen	One Thing at a Time	Country	Big Loud, Republic, Mercury	
March 3	Nakhane	Bastard Jargon		BMG	
March 3	Ruel	4th Wall		RCA	
March 3	Slowthai	Ugly	Post-punk, grime, indie rock	Method Records, Interscope	
March 3	Tanukichan	Gizmo		Company Records	
March 3	Willie Nelson	I Don't Know a Thing About Love	Country	Legacy	
March 3	Xiu Xiu	Ignore Grief		Polyvinyl	
March 3	Yazmin Lacey	Voice Notes	Neo soul, dub, R&B	Own Your Own Records, Believe	
March 3	Zulu	A New Tomorrow	Powerviolence	Flatspot Records	
March 6	Cravity	Master: Piece	K-pop	Starship	
March 6	Onew	Circle	Pop, R&B	SM	
March 6	Talib Kweli and Madlib	Liberation 2		Luminary	
March 8	NMB48	NMB13		Universal Music Japan	
March 9	Alice Longyu Gao	Let's Hope Heteros Fail, Learn and Retire			
March 9	Wes Borland	Mutiny on the Starbarge			
March 10	Alli Walker	Growing Up		Alli Walker	
March 10	Arppa	Valeria		Johanna Kustannus	
March 10	August Alsina	Myself	R&B	Shake the World, Empire	
March 10	The Cold Stares	Voices		Mascot	
March 10	Dutch Uncles	True Entertainment		Memphis Industries	
March 10	Fever Ray	Radical Romantics	Electropop, synth-pop	Mute	
March 10	For the Fallen Dreams	For the Fallen Dreams	Metalcore	Arising Empire	
March 10	Frankie Rose	Love as Projection		Slumberland	
March 10	Kristian Bush	52 | This Year		Big Machine	
March 10	Lonnie Holley	Oh Me Oh My	Experimental	Jagjaguwar	
March 10	Manchester Orchestra	The Valley of Vision	Indie rock	Loma Vista	
March 10	Meet Me at the Altar	Past // Present // Future	Pop-punk	Fueled by Ramen	
March 10	Miley Cyrus	Endless Summer Vacation	Pop, dance-pop	Columbia	
March 10	Nia Archives	Sunrise Bang Ur Head Against tha Wall			
March 10	The Nude Party	Rides On		New West	
March 10	Otherwise	Gawdzillionaire		Mascot	
March 10	Page McConnell & Trey Anastasio	January		JEMP	
March 10	Periphery	Periphery V: Djent Is Not a Genre	Progressive metal	3DOT Recordings	
March 10	Sleaford Mods	UK Grim		Rough Trade	
March 10	Story of the Year	Tear Me to Pieces		SharpTone	
March 10	Suicide Silence	Remember... You Must Die	Deathcore	Century Media	
March 10	Twice	Ready to Be	Pop	JYP, Republic	
March 10	Van Morrison	Moving On Skiffle		Exile Productions, Virgin Music	
March 14	Princess Nokia	I Love You but This Is Goodbye		Arista	
March 15	Aly & AJ	With Love From	Americana, folk, indie pop	AWAL	
March 17	100 gecs	10,000 Gecs	Hyperpop	Dog Show Records, Atlantic	
March 17	All Time Low	Tell Me I'm Alive	Pop-punk, pop rock	Fueled by Ramen	
March 17	Black Honey	A Fistful of Peaches		Foxfive Records	
March 17	Chelsea Grin	Suffer in Heaven	Deathcore	ONErpm	
March 17	EST Gee	Mad		CMG, Interscope	
March 17	Fidlar	That's Life			
March 17	Hozier	Eat Your Young	Soul, blues rock	Rubyworks, Columbia	
March 17	Invent Animate	Heavener	Metalcore	UNFD	
March 17	Kamelot	The Awakening	Symphonic metal, progressive metal, power metal	Napalm	
March 17	Kx5 (Kaskade and Deadmau5)	Kx5	House, techno	Mau5trap, Arkade	
March 17	Lana Del Rabies	Strega Beata	Electronic	Gilgongo Records	
March 17	Lil Keed	Keed Talk to 'Em 2		YSL	
March 17	Lil Pump	Lil Pump 2	Hip-hop, trap, SoundCloud rap		
March 17	M83	Fantasy	Shoegaze	Mute	
March 17	The Lost Days	In the Store	Indie folk	Speakeasy Studios SF	
March 17	Pop Evil	Skeletons		MNRK Heavy	
March 17	Sullivan King	Thrones of Blood	Heavy metal, bass music	Monstercat	
March 17	T-Pain	On Top of the Covers	R&B, hip-hop	Nappy Boy, Empire	
March 17	Theory of a Deadman	Dinosaur	Hard rock, alternative rock	604, Atlantic, Roadrunner	
March 17	U2	Songs of Surrender	Acoustic	Island, Interscope	
March 17	Unknown Mortal Orchestra	V		Jagjaguwar	
March 17	Various artists	Stoned Cold Country		This Is Hit	
March 17	Yves Tumor	Praise a Lord Who Chews but Which Does Not Consume; (Or Simply, Hot Between Worlds)		Warp	
March 22	Angerme	Big Love		Hachama	
March 22	Little Glee Monster	Fanfare		Sony Music Japan	
March 23	Navy Blue	Ways of Knowing	Hip-hop	Def Jam	
March 24	03 Greedo	Halfway There			
March 24	6lack	Since I Have a Lover	R&B, pop	LVRN, Interscope	
March 24	Ana Mena	Bellodrama	Pop, nu-disco	Sony Music Spain	
March 24	Arooj Aftab, Vijay Iyer, and Shahzad Ismaily	Love in Exile		Verve	
March 24	August Burns Red	Death Below	Metalcore, progressive metal	SharpTone	
March 24	Babymetal	The Other One	Kawaii metal, J-Pop	Amuse, Cooking Vinyl	
March 24	Black Country, New Road	Live at Bush Hall		Ninja Tune	
March 24	Caroline Rose	The Art of Forgetting	Indie folk, art pop	New West	
March 24	Cécile McLorin Salvant	Mélusine	Jazz	Nonesuch	
March 24	Danny Brown & JPEGMafia	Scaring the Hoes	Alternative hip-hop	AWAL	
March 24	Dawn Ray'd	To Know the Light		Prosthetic	
March 24	Depeche Mode	Memento Mori	Alternative rock, synth-pop	Columbia, Mute	
March 24	Fall Out Boy	So Much (for) Stardust	Pop rock	Fueled by Ramen, DCD2	
March 24	Hatesphere	Hatred Reborn	Thrash metal, melodic death metal	Scarlet	
March 24	Hit-Boy	Surf or Drown		Surf Club	
March 24	Jeff Goldblum	Plays Well with Others		Decca	
March 24	Jimin	Face	Pop, hip-hop, R&B	Big Hit Music	
March 24	Katie Melua	Love & Money		BMG	
March 24	Kele	The Flames Pt. 2		Kola Records, !K7 Music	
March 24	Lana Del Rey	Did You Know That There's a Tunnel Under Ocean Blvd	Alternative pop, Americana	Interscope	
March 24	Lankum	False Lankum	Folk	Rough Trade	
March 24	Liturgy	93696	Black metal	Thrill Jockey	
March 24	Ludmilla	Vilã	Pop, trap, funk carioca	Warner Music Brazil	
March 24	Luke Combs	Gettin' Old	Country	Columbia Nashville, River House Records	
March 24	Matt Corby	Everything's Fine		Island Australia	
March 24	Meg Myers	TZIA		Sumerian	
March 24	Mo'Ju	Oro, Plata, Mata			
March 24	Ne Obliviscaris	Exul	Extreme metal, progressive metal	Season of Mist	
March 24	Ov Sulfur	The Burden ov Faith	Symphonic deathcore	Century Media	
March 24	Owl City	Coco Moon	Electropop	Sky Harbour Studios	
March 24	Project 86	Omni, Pt. 1	Metalcore, industrial metal, nu metalcore	Spaceuntravel	
March 24	Quando Rondo	Recovery		Quando Rondo LLC, Never Broke Again, Atlantic	
March 24	Rosalía and Rauw Alejandro	RR		Columbia, Duars Entertainment, Sony Music Latin	
March 24	Saxon	More Inspirations	Heavy metal	Silver Lining Music	
March 24	Softcult	See You in the Dark	Grunge, shoegaze, pop	Easy Life Records	
March 24	Whitney Houston	I Go to the Rock: The Gospel Music of Whitney Houston	Gospel	Arista, Legacy, Gaither Music Group	
March 24	Yours Are the Only Ears	We Know the Sky		Lame-O	
March 25	Parannoul	After the Night			
March 29	Yuuri	Ni			
March 30	Xikers	House of Tricky: Doorbell Ringing	Dance	KQ	
March 31	B. Cool-Aid (Pink Siifu and Ahwlee)	Leather Blvd	Neo soul	Lex	
March 31	Boygenius	The Record	Indie rock	Interscope	
March 31	Bury Tomorrow	The Seventh Sun	Metalcore	Music For Nations	
March 31	Buzzy Lee	Internal Affairs			
March 31	Chlöe	In Pieces	R&B, pop, trap	Parkwood, Columbia	
March 31	City and Colour	The Love Still Held Me Near	Alternative rock, indie rock, folk rock	Still Records	
March 31	Davido	Timeless	Amapiano, Afrobeats	Columbia	
March 31	Deerhoof	Miracle-Level	Experimental rock, indie rock	Joyful Noise	
March 31	DMA's	How Many Dreams?		I Oh You	
March 31	Eddie Chacon	Sundown		Stones Throw	
March 31	The Hold Steady	The Price of Progress	Indie rock	Positive Jams, Thirty Tigers	
March 31	James Holden	Imagine This Is a High Dimensional Space of All Possibilities	Electronic	Border Community	
March 31	Larry June & The Alchemist	The Great Escape	Hip-hop	Freeminded Records, ALC, Empire	
March 31	Last in Line	Jericho		earMusic	
March 31	Lies	Lies		Polyvinyl	
March 31	London Brew	London Brew	Jazz fusion	Concord Jazz	
March 31	Lordi	Screem Writers Guild		Atomic Fire	
March 31	Melanie Martinez	Portals	Alternative pop	Atlantic	
March 31	Mystic 100's	On a Micro Diet		Online Ceramics, Listening House Media	
March 31	Neil Young and Crazy Horse	All Roads Lead Home		NYA Records	
March 31	The New Pornographers	Continue as a Guest	Indie rock	Merge	
March 31	Nothing,Nowhere	Void Eternal		Fueled by Ramen	
March 31	Puscifer	Existential Reckoning: Rewired		Puscifer Entertainment, Alchemy Recordings, BMG	
March 31	Rotten Sound	Apocalypse		Season of Mist	
March 31	Samiam	Stowaway		Pure Noise	
March 31	The Zombies	Different Game		Cooking Vinyl	

== Second quarter ==
=== April ===
List of albums released in April 2023
Go to: January | February | March | April | May | June | July | August | September | October | November | December | Back to top
Release date	Artist	Album	Genre	Label	Ref.
April 4	Currensy and Jermaine Dupri	For Motivational Use Only, Vol. 1		Jet Life	
April 5	Hayden	Are We Good		Arts & Crafts	
April 5	Peace	Utopia			
April 7	Billie Marten	Drop Cherries	English folk	Fiction	
April 7	Blondshell	Blondshell	Alternative rock, indie rock, grunge	Partisan	
April 7	Crocodiles	Upside Down in Heaven		Lolipop Records	
April 7	Cub Sport	Jesus at the Gay Bar		Cub Sport	
April 7	Daniel Caesar	Never Enough	R&B	Republic	
April 7	Daughter	Stereo Mind Game	Indie folk	Glassnote	
April 7	Ellie Goulding	Higher Than Heaven	Dance-pop, pop	Polydor	
April 7	Frenzal Rhomb	The Cup of Pestilence	Skate punk, melodic hardcore	Fat Wreck Chords	
April 7	HMLTD	The Worm		Lucky Number Music	
April 7	Mudhoney	Plastic Eternity	Grunge, psychedelic rock	Sub Pop	
April 7	NF	Hope	Hip-hop	NF Real Music, Caroline	
April 7	Paula Fernandes	11:11	Sertanejo, country pop	Universal Music Brazil	
April 7	Powerwolf	Interludium	Power metal, heavy metal	Napalm	
April 7	Rae Sremmurd	Sremm 4 Life		Ear Drummer, Interscope	
April 7	Ruston Kelly	The Weakness	Folk rock, alternative country, Americana	Rounder	
April 7	Sarah and the Safe Word	The Book of Broken Glass		Take This to Heart	
April 7	Teleman	Good Time/Hard Time		Moshi Moshi	
April 7	Thomas Bangalter	Mythologies	Classical	Erato, Warner Classics	
April 7	Tim Hecker	No Highs	Ambient	Kranky	
April 7	Wednesday	Rat Saw God	Shoegaze, alternative country, grunge	Dead Oceans	
April 7	Yaeji	With a Hammer		XL	
April 8	Armin van Buuren	Feel Again	Progressive house	Armada Music	
April 10	Ive	I've Ive		Starship	
April 10	Kep1er	Lovestruck!	K-pop	Wake One	
April 12	Buck-Tick	Izora	Alternative rock	Victor	
April 12	Ling Tosite Sigure	Last Aurorally	Post-hardcore	Sony Music Japan	
April 13	Lali	Lali	Hyperpop, dance, EDM	Sony Music Argentina	
April 14	Angel Olsen	Forever Means		Jagjaguwar	
April 14	Black Thought and El Michels Affair	Glorious Game	Hip-hop	Big Crown	
April 14	Caitlyn Smith	High & Low	Country pop	Monument	
April 14	Dinner Party	Enigmatic Society	R&B, jazz	Sounds of Crenshaw, Empire	
April 14	Feist	Multitudes		Polydor	
April 14	Fenne Lily	Big Picture		Dead Oceans	
April 14	Jesus Piece	...So Unknown	Metalcore	Century Media	
April 14	Joe Bonamassa	Tales of Time		J&R Adventures	
April 14	L.A. Guns	Black Diamonds			
April 14	Metallica	72 Seasons	Heavy metal, thrash metal	Blackened	
April 14	Natalie Merchant	Keep Your Courage	Americana, baroque pop	Nonesuch	
April 14	Natural Information Society Community Ensemble	Since Time Is Gravity	Free jazz, minimalism	Eremite	
April 14	Overkill	Scorched	Thrash metal	Nuclear Blast	
April 14	Ozmotic and Fennesz	Senzatempo		Touch	
April 14	Petite Noir	MotherFather		Roya	
April 14	Robert Earl Keen	Western Chill		Scriptorium Rex	
April 14	Temples	Exotico		ATO	
April 14	The Tallest Man on Earth	Henry St.		Anti-	
April 14	Waterparks	Intellectual Property		Fueled by Ramen	
April 14	Xylouris White	The Forest in Me			
April 14	Yung Bleu	Love Scars II		Empire	
April 15	Pet Shop Boys	Lost	Dance-pop	x2	
April 19	ExWhyZ	Xanadu	J-pop	EMI	
April 19	Miranda!	Hotel Miranda!	Latin pop	Sony Music Argentina	
April 20	Portrayal of Guilt	Devil Music		Run for Cover	
April 20	Ryu Su-jeong	Archive of Emotions	R&B, K-pop, alternative pop	House of Dreams	
April 20	Smino	S.A.D. 2			
April 20	Wave to Earth	0.1 Flaws and All	Indie rock	Wavy	
April 21	The 69 Eyes	Death of Darkness		Atomic Fire	
April 21	Agust D	D-Day		Big Hit Music	
April 21	Dozer	Drifting in the Endless Void	Stoner rock, stoner metal, psychedelic rock	Blues Funeral Recordings	
April 21	Enter Shikari	A Kiss for the Whole World		SO Recordings	
April 21	Esther Rose	Safe to Run		New West	
April 21	Everything but the Girl	Fuse	Pop, downtempo, R&B	Buzzin' Fly, Virgin	
April 21	The Heavy	Amen			
April 21	Jethro Tull	RökFlöte	Folk rock, progressive rock	Inside Out Music	
April 21	Lloyd Banks	The Course of the Inevitable III: Pieces of My Pain	East Coast hip-hop	Money by Any Means, Empire	
April 21	Loren Gray	Guilty			
April 21	Mac DeMarco	One Wayne G		Mac's Record Label	
April 21	Rodrigo y Gabriela	In Between Thoughts...A New World		ATO	
April 21	Silver Moth	Black Bay	Post-rock	Bella Union	
April 21	Superviolet	Infinite Spring	Indie folk	Lame-O	
April 21	The Mars Volta	Que Dios Te Maldiga Mi Corazón		Clouds Hill Records	
April 21	Nourished by Time	Erotic Probiotic 2	Freestyle, R&B, bedroom pop	Scenic Route Records	
April 21	Tiësto	Drive		Musical Freedom Records, Atlantic	
April 21	YoungBoy Never Broke Again	Don't Try This at Home	Hip-hop	Motown, Never Broke Again	
April 22	Beach House	Become	Dream pop	Sub Pop	
April 24	Seventeen	FML	K-pop	Pledis	
April 26	Chanmina	Naked		No Label Music	
April 26	Jim Legxacy	Homeless N*gga Pop Music		(!)	
April 27	Glen Matlock	Consequences Coming		Cooking Vinyl	
April 27	Marina Sena	Vício Inerente	Pop	Sony Music Brazil	
April 28	Andrew Swift	Lightning Strikes and Neon Nights		ABC Music	
April 28	Avalon Emerson	& the Charm	Electronic, dream pop, synth-pop	Another Dove, One House Records	
April 28	Baby Rose	Through and Through	Soul	Secretly Canadian	
April 28	Bebe Rexha	Bebe	Dance-pop, disco	Warner	
April 28	Bill Orcutt	Jump on It		Palilalia Records	
April 28	Braids	Euphoric Recall		Secret City	
April 28	Brett Kissel	The Compass Project - East Album	Country	Big Star Recordings, ONErpm	
April 28	Crown the Empire	Dogma		Rise	
April 28	The Damned	Darkadelic	Punk rock, psychedelic, gothic rock	Earmusic	
April 28	Dave Hause	Drive It Like It's Stolen		Blood Harmony Records, Soundly Music	
April 28	Del Barber	Almanac		Acronym Records	
April 28	Gord Bamford	Fire It Up		Anthem	
April 28	Griffen Palmer	Unlearn	Country, country pop	Big Loud	
April 28	Illenium	Illenium			
April 28	Indigo De Souza	All of This Will End	Indie rock, alternative rock	Saddle Creek	
April 28	Jack Harlow	Jackman	Hip-hop	Generation Now, Atlantic	
April 28	Jessie Ware	That! Feels Good!		PMR, EMI	
April 28	Joseph	The Sun		ATO	
April 28	Josh Ritter	Spectral Lines	Americana, folk	Pytheas Recordings	
April 28	Joy Oladokun	Proof of Life		Amigo Records, Verve Forecast, Republic	
April 28	Kip Moore	Damn Love			
April 28	Matt Maltese	Driving Just to Drive		Nettwerk	
April 28	The National	First Two Pages of Frankenstein	Rock	4AD	
April 28	Neil Gaiman and FourPlay String Quartet	Signs of Life		Instrumental Recordings	
April 28	Nines	Crop Circle 2		Zino Records, Warner	
April 28	The Orb	Prism		Cooking Vinyl	
April 28	Rickie Lee Jones	Pieces of Treasure	Jazz	BMG, Modern Recordings	
April 28	Ruth Anderson and Annea Lockwood	Tête-à-Tête	Avant-garde	Ergot Records	
April 28	Ryan Beatty	Calico	Indie folk, alternative pop	Elektra, Atlantic	
April 28	Smokey Robinson	Gasms	Soul, R&B	TLR Records	
April 28	Susanne Sundfør	Blómi	Folk, ambient	Bella Union	
April 28	Tim and the Glory Boys	Tim & the Glory Boys		Sony Music	
April 28	Thomas Wesley	Thomas Wesley: Chapter 2 – Swamp Savant			
April 28	Tony Shhnow	Love Streak			

=== May ===
List of albums released in May 2023
Go to: January | February | March | April | May | June | July | August | September | October | November | December | Back to top
Release date	Artist	Album	Genre	Label	Ref.
May 1	Le Sserafim	Unforgiven	Experimental pop	Source Music	
May 1	Witch Prophet	Gateway Experience		Heart Lake Records	
May 3	BRADIO	Dancehall Magic		Crown	
May 3	Flume	Arrived Anxious, Left Bored	Electronic	Future Classic, Transgressive	
May 5	Ana Popović	Power	Rock, blues, jazz	ArtisteXclusive	
May 5	Atmosphere	So Many Other Realities Exist Simultaneously		Rhymesayers	
May 5	Billy Woods and Kenny Segal	Maps	Hip-hop	Backwoodz Studioz	
May 5	Body/Head	Come On		Open Mouth Records, Three Lobed Recordings	
May 5	Conway the Machine	Won't He Do It	East Coast hip-hop	Drumwork Music Group, Empire	
May 5	DC the Don	Funeral			
May 5	Deathstars	Everything Destroys You	Gothic metal, industrial metal	Nuclear Blast	
May 5	Destroy Lonely	If Looks Could Kill	Hip-hop	Opium, Interscope	
May 5	Drain	Living Proof	Hardcore punk	Epitaph	
May 5	Ed Sheeran	−	Folk-pop	Asylum, Atlantic	
May 5	Emily King	Special Occasion		ATO	
May 5	Fred Again and Brian Eno	Secret Life	Ambient	Text	
May 5	Gord Downie and Bob Rock	Lustre Parfait		Arts & Crafts	
May 5	Grandson	I Love You, I'm Trying		Fueled by Ramen	
May 5	IDK	F65	Hip-hop, jazz	Warner, Clue	
May 5	Jeleel	Real Raw!		10K	
May 5	Jidenna	Me You & God			
May 5	Joe Lovano	Our Daily Bread	Jazz	ECM	
May 5	Justin Moore	Stray Dog	Country	Valory Music	
May 5	The Lemon Twigs	Everything Harmony		Captured Tracks	
May 5	Megan Moroney	Lucky	Country	Sony Music	
May 5	Olivia Jean	Raving Ghost		Third Man	
May 5	Olivia Newton-John	Just the Two of Us: The Duets Collection (Vol. 1)	Pop	Primary Wave	
May 5	Pacific Avenue	Flowers		BMG	
May 5	Panchiko	Failed at Math(s)	Indie rock, trip hop, electronic		
May 5	Rodney Crowell	The Chicago Sessions	Country, Americana	New West	
May 5	Sbtrkt	The Rat Road			
May 5	The Smashing Pumpkins	Atum: Act Three		Martha's Music, Thirty Tigers	
May 5	Snakehips	Never Worry		Helix Records	
May 5	Sqürl	Silver Haze	Drone rock, stoner rock	Sacred Bones	
May 5	Therapy?	Hard Cold Fire	Alternative metal, alternative rock	Marshall	
May 5	Unearth	The Wretched; the Ruinous	Metalcore	Century Media	
May 8	Aespa	My World		SM, Warner, Dreamus	
May 10	Dr. Teeth and the Electric Mayhem	The Muppets Mayhem	Rock	Walt Disney	
May 10	Gang Parade	Our Parade	J-pop	Fueled By Mentaiko	
May 10	Pasocom Music Club	Fine Line	Synth-pop	Hatihati Pro	
May 10	Yoasobi	Hajimete no – EP	J-pop	Sony Japan	
May 12	The Acacia Strain	Step Into the Light	Deathcore, metalcore	Rise	
May 12	The Acacia Strain	Failure Will Follow	Sludge metal, doom metal	Rise	
May 12	Alison Goldfrapp	The Love Invention		Skint	
May 12	The Amity Affliction	Not Without My Ghosts	Metalcore, post-hardcore	Pure Noise	
May 12	Bailey Zimmerman	Religiously. The Album.	Country	Warner Music Nashville	
May 12	Belinda Carlisle	Kismet		RAF, BMG	
May 12	B.C. Camplight	The Last Rotation of Earth			
May 12	Black Spiders	Can't Die, Won't Die		Spinefarm	
May 12	Bruce Cockburn	O Sun O Moon		True North	
May 12	Cattle Decapitation	Terrasite	Technical death metal, deathgrind	Metal Blade	
May 12	DevilDriver	Dealing with Demons Vol. II		Napalm	
May 12	Dropkick Murphys	Okemah Rising	Celtic punk, folk rock	Dummy Luck Music	
May 12	Fatoumata Diawara	London Ko		Wagram	
May 12	Hot Mulligan	Why Would I Watch		Wax Bodega Records	
May 12	Jonas Brothers	The Album	Americana, pop, yacht rock	Republic	
May 12	Kate Ceberano (with Melbourne Symphony Orchestra)	My Life Is a Symphony		ABC Music	
May 12	Keke Palmer	Big Boss		Big Bosses Entertainment	
May 12	Lovejoy	Wake Up & It's Over	Indie rock, pop-punk	Anvil Cat, AWAL	
May 12	Moby	Resound NYC		Deutsche Grammophon	
May 12	Overmono	Good Lies	2-step garage, techno, pop	XL	
May 12	Parker McCollum	Never Enough	Country	MCA Nashville	
May 12	Potter Payper	Real Back in Style	British hip-hop	0207 Def Jam	
May 12	Sub Focus	Evolve	Drum and bass	Virgin EMI	
May 12	Veil of Maya	Mother	Metalcore, progressive metal	Sumerian	
May 12	YoungBoy Never Broke Again	Richest Opp	Hip-hop, gangsta rap, trap	Never Broke Again, Motown	
May 17	Sakura Fujiwara	Airport			
May 19	Alex Lahey	The Answer Is Always Yes	Indie rock	Liberation	
May 19	Bad Dreems	Hoo Ha!		Farmer & the Owl	
May 19	Bar Italia	Tracey Denim	Hypnagogic pop, post-punk, shoegaze	Matador	
May 19	Botanist	VIII: Selenotrope		Prophecy	
May 19	Chapel Hart	Glory Days			
May 19	Damien Done	Total Power		Mind Over Matter Records	
May 19	Dave Matthews Band	Walk Around the Moon	Rock	RCA	
May 19	Def Leppard (with Royal Philharmonic Orchestra)	Drastic Symphonies	Symphonic rock, symphonic metal	Mercury	
May 19	Galen & Paul	Can We Do Tomorrow Another Day?			
May 19	Ghost	Phantomime		Loma Vista	
May 19	Graham Nash	Now	Folk rock	BMG	
May 19	Hannah Jadagu	Aperture		Sub Pop	
May 19	Joe Deninzon & Stratospheerius	Behind the Curtain (Live at ProgStock)		Alliance Distribution	
May 19	Kaytraminé (Kaytranada and Aminé)	Kaytraminé		CLBN, Venice Music	
May 19	Kesha	Gag Order		Kemosabe, RCA	
May 19	Khanate	To Be Cruel		Sacred Bones	
May 19	Lewis Capaldi	Broken by Desire to Be Heavenly Sent	Pop	Capitol	
May 19	Lionel Loueke and Gretchen Parlato	Lean In	Jazz	Edition	
May 19	Mega Bog	End of Everything		Mexican Summer	
May 19	The Ocean	Holocene	Experimental, electronic	Pelagic Records	
May 19	Paul Simon	Seven Psalms	Acoustic	Owl Records, Legacy	
May 19	Sir Chloe	I Am the Dog		Atlantic	
May 19	Sleep Token	Take Me Back to Eden		Spinefarm	
May 19	Timo Andres, Conor Hanick, and Sufjan Stevens	Reflections		Asthmatic Kitty	
May 19	Summer Walker	Clear 2: Soft Life		Love Renaissance, Interscope	
May 19	Tinariwen	Amatssou	African blues, world	Wedge	
May 19	The Used	Toxic Positivity	Alternative rock, emo, post-hardcore	Big Noise	
May 19	The Vanns	Last of Your Kind		Upper River Records	
May 19	Yes	Mirror to the Sky	Progressive rock	Inside Out Music, Sony Music	
May 22	Enhypen	Dark Blood	K-pop, hip-hop	Belift Lab	
May 25	Cruz Cafuné	Me Muevo con Dios		Mécèn Entertainment	
May 26	AJJ	Disposable Everything		Hopeless	
May 26	Arlo Parks	My Soft Machine		Transgressive	
May 26	The Barnestormers	The Barnestormers		Bloodlines Music	
May 26	Boy & Bear	Boy & Bear		Boy & Bear	
May 26	Clark	Sus Dog	Electronica, art pop	Throttle Records	
May 26	D4vd	Petals to Thorns	Indie pop, alternative R&B, bedroom pop	Darkroom, Interscope	
May 26	The Dirty Nil	Free Rein to Passions		Dine Alone	
May 26	Fishbone	Fishbone		Bottles to the Ground	
May 26	Gia Margaret	Romantic Piano	Ambient, indie folk	Jagjaguwar	
May 26	Heart Attack Man	Freak of Nature	Pop-punk, emo, alternative rock	Many Hats	
May 26	Immortal	War Against All	Black metal	Nuclear Blast	
May 26	Kodak Black	Pistolz & Pearlz	Hip-hop, trap	Atlantic	
May 26	Kari Faux	Real B*tches Don't Die!		Drink Sum Wtr	
May 26	Lil Durk	Almost Healed	Hip-hop, drill	Alamo, Sony Music	
May 26	Lola Young	My Mind Wanders and Sometimes Leaves Completely		Island	
May 26	Matchbox Twenty	Where the Light Goes	Pop rock	Atlantic	
May 26	Metal Church	Congregation of Annihilation	Heavy metal, thrash metal	Rat Pak Records	
May 26	Miya Folick	Roach	Indie rock, pop	Nettwerk	
May 26	Sparks	The Girl Is Crying in Her Latte	Art pop	Island	
May 26	Water from Your Eyes	Everyone's Crushed	Indie pop	Matador	
May 26	Wolf Eyes	Dreams in Splattered Lines		Disciples	

=== June ===
List of albums released in June 2023
Go to: January | February | March | April | May | June | July | August | September | October | November | December | Back to top
Release date	Artist	Album	Genre	Label	Ref.
June 1	Jam City	Jam City Presents EFM		Earthly Recordings	
June 2	The Aces	I've Loved You for So Long	Indie pop	Red Bull	
June 2	Avenged Sevenfold	Life Is But a Dream...	Avant-garde metal, heavy metal, progressive metal	Warner	
June 2	Baxter Dury	I Thought I Was Better Than You	Hip-hop	Heavenly	
June 2	Beach Fossils	Bunny	Indie pop, dream pop	Bayonet Records	
June 2	Ben Folds	What Matters Most	Chamber pop	New West	
June 2	Ben Harper	Wide Open Light	Folk	Chrysalis	
June 2	Bob Dylan	Shadow Kingdom	Folk rock	Columbia	
June 2	Body Type	Expired Candy	Indie rock, post-punk	Poison City	
June 2	Buckcherry	Vol. 10			
June 2	Bully	Lucky for You		Sub Pop	
June 2	Cowboy Junkies	Such Ferocious Beauty	Americana	Latent, Cooking Vinyl	
June 2	DZ Deathrays	R.I.F.F		DZ Worldwide	
June 2	Foo Fighters	But Here We Are	Rock	Roswell, RCA	
June 2	Half Moon Run	Salt		BMG	
June 2	Jake Shears	Last Man Dancing	Dance-pop	Mute	
June 2	Jelly Roll	Whitsitt Chapel	Country	Bailee & Buddy, BBR	
June 2	Juan Wauters	Wandering Rebel		Captured Tracks	
June 2	Katie Wighton	The End		ABC Music	
June 2	Kenny Rogers	Life Is Like a Song	Country	UMe	
June 2	Knower	Knower Forever		Knower	
June 2	Lanterns on the Lake	Versions of Us		Bella Union	
June 2	Lonestar	Ten to 1			
June 2	Louise Post	Sleepwalker		El Camino	
June 2	McKinley Dixon	Beloved! Paradise! Jazz!?	Jazz rap, conscious hip-hop	City Slang	
June 2	Meshell Ndegeocello	The Omnichord Real Book	Jazz, R&B	Blue Note	
June 2	Metro Boomin	Spider-Man: Across the Spider-Verse		Boominati Worldwide, Republic	
June 2	Moneybagg Yo	Hard to Love	Hip-hop, trap	CMG, N-Less, Interscope	
June 2	Noel Gallagher's High Flying Birds	Council Skies	Alternative rock	Sour Mash Records	
June 2	Protomartyr	Formal Growth in the Desert	Post-punk	Domino	
June 2	Rancid	Tomorrow Never Comes	Punk rock	Epitaph	
June 2	The Revivalists	Pour It Out into the Night		Concord	
June 2	Rival Sons	Darkfighter		Atlantic	
June 2	Rufus Wainwright	Folkocracy	Folk, Americana	BMG	
June 2	RVG	Brain Worms		Ivy League	
June 2	Sophie Ellis-Bextor	Hana	Pop, pop rock, art pop	Cooking Vinyl	
June 2	Stray Kids	5-Star	Hip-hop, pop, electronica	JYP, Republic	
June 2	Tanya Tucker	Sweet Western Sound	Country	Fantasy	
June 2	Tigercub	The Perfume of Decay		Loosegrove	
June 2	Wicca Phase Springs Eternal	Wicca Phase Springs Eternal		Run for Cover	
June 2	Witch	Zango	Zamrock	Desert Daze Sound, Partisan	
June 5	Dave & Central Cee	Split Decision	British hip-hop	Neighbourhood Records, Live Yours	
June 5	Fromis 9	Unlock My World	K-pop	Pledis, YG Plus	
June 5	Travis Japan	Moving Pieces – EP		Capitol	
June 6	BabyTron	6		Empire	
June 6	Flyin Up	Jimlik			
June 8	The Dead Milkmen	Quaker City Quiet Pills		The Giving Groove	
June 9	Amaarae	Fountain Baby	R&B, afrobeats, pop	Interscope	
June 9	Amanda Marshall	Heavy Lifting		Coalition Music, The Orchard	
June 9	Caitlyn Shadbolt	Bloom & Surrender	Country		
June 9	Christine and the Queens	Paranoia, Angels, True Love	Art pop, experimental pop	Because	
June 9	Decisive Pink (Kate NV and Angel Deradoorian)	Ticket to Fame	Minimal wave	Fire	
June 9	Dream Wife	Social Lubrication		Lucky Number	
June 9	Extreme	Six	Hard rock	earMUSIC	
June 9	Future Utopia	We Were We Still Are		The Orchard, 70 Hz Recordings	
June 9	Godflesh	Purge	Industrial metal	Avalanche	
June 9	Janelle Monáe	The Age of Pleasure	Afrobeat, reggae, soul	Wondaland, Bad Boy, Atlantic	
June 9	Jason Isbell and the 400 Unit	Weathervanes		Southeastern Records	
June 9	Jayda G	Guy	Electronic	Ninja Tune	
June 9	Jenny Lewis	Joy'All		Blue Note	
June 9	Jess Williamson	Time Ain't Accidental	Americana, country pop, indie country	Mexican Summer	
June 9	Jonny Greenwood and Dudu Tassa	Jarak Qaribak	Middle Eastern music	World Circuit	
June 9	King Krule	Space Heavy		XL, Matador	
June 9	Milky Chance	Living in a Haze		Muggelig Records	
June 9	Niall Horan	The Show		Capitol	
June 9	Nicholas Allbrook	Manganese		Spinning Top Records	
June 9	Rico Nasty	A Nasty Summer		X5	
June 9	Scar Symmetry	The Singularity (Phase II – Xenotaph)	Melodic death metal	Nuclear Blast	
June 9	Slipknot	Adderall	Downtempo, alternative rock	Roadrunner	
June 9	Squid	O Monolith	Post-punk	Warp	
June 9	This Is the Kit	Careful of Your Keepers	Folk rock	Rough Trade	
June 9	Youth Lagoon	Heaven Is a Junkyard		Fat Possum	
June 13	Spoon	Memory Dust	Indie rock	Matador	
June 13	Wiz Khalifa	See Ya		Taylor Gang	
June 16	Ben Howard	Is It?		Island	
June 16	Bettye LaVette	LaVette!		Jay Vee Records	
June 16	Bonny Doon	Let There Be Music		Anti-	
June 16	Boris and Uniform	Bright New Disease		Sacred Bones	
June 16	Chris Janson	The Outlaw Side of Me		Big Machine	
June 16	Damian Lewis	Mission Creep		Decca	
June 16	Deer Tick	Emotional Contracts	Americana, indie rock, roots rock	ATO	
June 16	Django Django	Off Planet		Because	
June 16	Ezra Williams	Supernumeraries	Indie pop	AWAL	
June 16	Gov't Mule	Peace... Like a River		Fantasy	
June 16	Gunna	A Gift & a Curse		YSL	
June 16	Home Is Where	The Whaler	Emo	Wax Bodega	
June 16	Jack River	Endless Summer	Pop	I Oh You	
June 16	John Mellencamp	Orpheus Descending	Alternative country, alternative folk	Republic	
June 16	Kiana Ledé	Grudges		The Heavy Group, Republic	
June 16	Killer Mike	Michael	Southern hip-hop	VLNS, LLC, Loma Vista	
June 16	King Gizzard & the Lizard Wizard	PetroDragonic Apocalypse	Thrash metal, progressive metal	KGLW	
June 16	Kool Keith	Black Elvis 2	Hip-hop	Mello	
June 16	Origami Angel	The Brightest Days	Emo	Counter Intuitive	
June 16	Queens of the Stone Age	In Times New Roman...	Alternative rock, stoner rock	Matador	
June 16	Royal Thunder	Rebuilding the Mountain		Spinefarm	
June 16	Sigur Rós	Átta	Post-rock, modern classical	BMG	
June 16	Son Volt	Day of the Doug	Alternative country	Transmit Sound, Thirty Tigers	
June 16	Steve Lukather	Bridges			
June 16	The Teskey Brothers	The Winding Way		Ivy League	
June 16	Tom Grennan	What Ifs & Maybes			
June 16	Yusuf / Cat Stevens	King of a Land	Children's, religious	BMG, Dark Horse	
June 21	Kiss Kiss	First Album	J-pop	WACK	
June 23	Amanda Shires and Bobbie Nelson	Loving You	Country	Silver Knife, ATO	
June 23	Austin Mahone	A Lone Star Story	Country	A.M. Music	
June 23	Big Freedia	Central City	Bounce	Queen Diva Music	
June 23	Blue Lake	Sun Arcs			
June 23	Cable Ties	All Her Plans	Punk rock, post-punk	Merge	
June 23	Coi Leray	Coi		Uptown, Republic	
June 23	Cry Club	Spite Will Save Me		Cry Club	
June 23	Geese	3D Country	Alternative country, blues rock, jam band	Partisan	
June 23	Jag Panzer	The Hallowed	Power metal, heavy metal	Atomic Fire Records	
June 23	Jake Owen	Loose Cannon			
June 23	Jason Mraz	Mystical Magical Rhythmical Radical Ride	Pop, disco	Interrabang, BMG	
June 23	Kelly Clarkson	Chemistry	Pop, pop rock	Atlantic	
June 23	Kim Petras	Feed the Beast	Pop, dance	Amigo Records, Republic	
June 23	Lastlings	Perfect World		Rose Avenue Records, Liberation	
June 23	M. Ward	Supernatural Thing			
June 23	Maisie Peters	The Good Witch	Dance-pop, pop rock	Gingerbread Man, Asylum	
June 23	Mental Cruelty	Zwielicht	Symphonic black metal, deathcore	Century Media	
June 23	Michael Bolton	Spark of Light			
June 23	Portugal. The Man	Chris Black Changed My Life		Atlantic	
June 23	Swans	The Beggar	Post-rock, drone	Young God	
June 23	TeeFlii and Dom Kennedy	I Love Stocker		The OPM Company	
June 23	Trophy Eyes	Suicide and Sunshine		Hopeless	
June 23	Valley	Lost in Translation		Universal, Capitol	
June 23	Various artists	Asteroid City (Original Soundtrack)		ABKCO	
June 23	Vexed	Negative Energy		Napalm	
June 23	Young Thug	Business Is Business		YSL, 300, Atlantic	
June 30	The Alchemist	Flying High		ALC Records	
June 30	The Baseball Project	Grand Salami Time!	Garage rock, power pop	Omnivore	
June 30	Brooke McClymont and Adam Eckersley	Up, Down & Sideways		Lost Highway, Universal	
June 30	Currensy and Harry Fraud	Vices		Jet Life	
June 30	Divide and Dissolve	Systemic		Invada	
June 30	Grateful Dead	Here Comes Sunshine 1973	Rock	Rhino	
June 30	Grian Chatten	Chaos for the Fly	Indie folk, alternative rock	Partisan	
June 30	The Guess Who	Plein D'Amour		Deko Entertainment	
June 30	The Japanese House	In the End It Always Does		Dirty Hit	
June 30	Jerry Garcia Band	Garcia Live Volume 20	Rock	ATO	
June 30	Joanna Sternberg	I've Got Me		Fat Possum	
June 30	John Carroll Kirby	Blowout		Stones Throw	
June 30	Kesha	Gag Order (Live Acoustic EP from Space)		Kemosabe, RCA	
June 30	Lil Uzi Vert	Pink Tape	Trap, rap rock, rage rap	Generation Now, Atlantic	
June 30	Loma Prieta	Last		Deathwish	
June 30	Lucinda Williams	Stories from a Rock n Roll Heart	Rock, Americana	Highway 20 Records, Thirty Tigers	
June 30	Natanael Cano	Nata Montana		Warner Music Latina	
June 30	Nothing but Thieves	Dead Club City		Sony Music UK	
June 30	Olivia Dean	Messy	Pop-soul, neo soul	EMI	
June 30	Pool Kids	Pool Kids // Pool			
June 30	Raven	All Hell's Breaking Loose		Silver Lining Music	
June 30	Shakti	This Moment		Abstract Logix	
June 30	Siti Nurhaliza	Sitism	Pop, R&B	Siti Nurhaliza Productions	
June 30	Terrace Martin	Fine Tune		Sounds of Crenshaw	

== Third quarter ==
=== July ===
List of albums released in July 2023
Go to: January | February | March | April | May | June | July | August | September | October | November | December | Back to top
Release date	Artist	Album	Genre	Label	Ref.
July 3	Flo	3 of Us	R&B	Island	
July 3	Nicky Wire	Intimism			
July 5	Asian Kung-Fu Generation	Surf Bungaku Kamakura Complete	Indie rock, alternative rock, surf rock	Kioon Music	
July 5	Kiss of Life	Kiss of Life		S2 Entertainment	
July 5	Mrs. Green Apple	Antenna		EMI	
July 5	Tomorrow X Together	Sweet		BigHit, Universal Japan	
July 7	12 Rods	If We Stayed Alive	Indie rock	American Dreams Records, Husky Pants Records	
July 7	Anohni and the Johnsons	My Back Was a Bridge for You to Cross	Soul	Secretly Canadian	
July 7	Butcher Babies	Eye for an Eye... / ...'Til the World's Blind	Metalcore, heavy metal	Century Media	
July 7	Dominic Fike	Sunburn	Pop rock	Columbia	
July 7	Gabriels	Angels & Queens - Part II	Soul	Atlas Artists, Parlophone	
July 7	Grouplove	I Want It All Right Now		Glassnote	
July 7	Gus Dapperton	Henge		AWAL	
July 7	Julie Byrne	The Greater Wings	American folk, contemporary folk	Ghostly	
July 7	Little Dragon	Slugs of Love	R&B, trip hop	Ninja Tune	
July 7	Local Natives	Time Will Wait for No One		Loma Vista	
July 7	Meursault	Meursault		Common Grounds Records	
July 7	Nicole Zuraitis	How Love Begins	Jazz	Outside in Music	
July 7	Nita Strauss	The Call of the Void	Rock	Sumerian	
July 7	The Pigeon Detectives	TV Show			
July 7	PJ Harvey	I Inside the Old Year Dying	Post-punk, neofolk	Partisan	
July 7	Rauw Alejandro	Playa Saturno	Reggaeton	Sony Music Latin, Duars Entertainment	
July 7	The Raven Age	Blood Omen		Music For Nations, Sony Music	
July 7	Taylor Swift	Speak Now (Taylor's Version)	Country pop, pop rock	Republic	
July 7	Will Haven	VII	Sludge metal	Minus Head Records	
July 7	Yellowcard	Childhood Eyes	Pop-punk	Equal Vision	
July 10	Exo	Exist	K-pop, R&B	SM	
July 10	Zerobaseone	Youth in the Shade	K-pop, dance	WakeOne	
July 11	BT	The Secret Language of Trees		Monstercat	
July 14	Bimini	When the Party Ends		Relentless	
July 14	Claud	Supermodels		Saddest Factory, Dead Oceans	
July 14	Colter Wall	Little Songs		La Honda Records, RCA	
July 14	Disclosure	Alchemy		AWAL, Apollo Records	
July 14	Evile	The Unknown		Napalm	
July 14	Glaive	I Care So Much That I Don't Care at All	Emo, pop, rock	Interscope	
July 14	Gordon Lightfoot	At Royal Albert Hall		Linus	
July 14	J Hus	Beautiful and Brutal Yard	Drill, dancehall, Afrobeat	Black Butter	
July 14	John Coltrane	Evenings at the Village Gate: John Coltrane with Eric Dolphy	Avant-garde jazz	Impulse!	
July 14	King Von	Grandson	Hip-hop, drill, gangsta rap	Empire	
July 14	Kool & the Gang	People Just Wanna Have Fun		Astana Music, BFD Records, The Orchard	
July 14	Lukas Nelson & Promise of the Real	Sticks and Stones		Thirty Tigers, 6ACE Records	
July 14	Mahalia	IRL	R&B	Atlantic	
July 14	MisterWives	Nosebleeds	Indie pop	Photo Finish, Resilient Little Records	
July 14	Natural Wonder Beauty Concept (Ana Roxanne and DJ Python)	Natural Wonder Beauty Concept	Electronic	Mexican Summer	
July 14	Palehound	Eye on the Bat		Polyvinyl	
July 14	Pvris	Evergreen	Electropop	Hopeless	
July 14	Rita Ora	You & I	Dance-pop	BMG	
July 14	Sam Burton	Dear Departed	Folk	Partisan	
July 14	Snõõper	Super Snõõper	Egg punk	Third Man	
July 14	Tech N9ne	Bliss	Hip-hop	Strange	
July 14	Tina Arena	Love Saves		Positive Dream	
July 14	Voyager	Fearless in Love	Progressive metal	Season of Mist	
July 19	NiziU	Coconut	J-pop	JYP, Sony Music	
July 20	Rezz	It's Not a Phase		HypnoVision Records	
July 21	Andrew Bird	Outside Problems		Loma Vista	
July 21	As December Falls	Join the Club		ADF Records	
July 21	Blur	The Ballad of Darren	Alternative rock, indie rock	Parlophone	
July 21	Cut Worms	Cut Worms		Jagjaguwar	
July 21	Grace Carter	A Little Lost, A Little Found			
July 21	Greta Van Fleet	Starcatcher	Blues rock, progressive rock, psychedelic rock	Lava, Republic	
July 21	Guided by Voices	Welshpool Frillies	Indie rock	Guided by Voices Inc.	
July 21	Half Japanese	Jump into Love		Fire	
July 21	Ian Moss	Rivers Run Dry		Mosstrooper Records	
July 21	Ludwig Göransson	Oppenheimer (Original Motion Picture Soundtrack)	Contemporary classical	Back Lot Music	
July 21	Kode9 and Burial	Infirmary / Unknown Summer		Fabric Originals	
July 21	Mizmor	Prosaic	Blackened doom	Profound Lore	
July 21	Molly Tuttle	City of Gold	Bluegrass	Nonesuch	
July 21	Nas and Hit-Boy	Magic 2	Hip-hop	Mass Appeal	
July 21	NewJeans	Get Up	Dance, R&B	ADOR	
July 21	Nils Lofgren	Mountains	Rock	Cattle Track Road Records	
July 21	Oxbow	Love's Holiday		Ipecac	
July 21	Paris Texas	Mid Air		Paris Texas LLC	
July 21	Various artists	Barbie the Album	Pop, hip-hop	Atlantic	
July 26	Aimer	Open α Door		Sacra Music	
July 26	Hanabie.	Reborn Superstar!	Metalcore, electronicore	Epic Japan	
July 26	MiSaMo	Masterpiece	J-pop	JYP, Warner Music Japan	
July 28	Anne-Marie	Unhealthy	Pop, dance-pop	Major Tom's, Asylum, Atlantic	
July 28	Aphex Twin	Blackbox Life Recorder 21f / In a Room7 F760	Electronic	Warp	
July 28	Bethany Cosentino	Natural Disaster	Pop rock, folk rock, Americana	Concord	
July 28	Beverly Glenn-Copeland	The Ones Ahead		Transgressive	
July 28	Brad	In the Moment That You're Born		Loosegrove	
July 28	Carly Rae Jepsen	The Loveliest Time		604, Schoolboy, Interscope	
July 28	The Clientele	I Am Not There Anymore	Indie rock	Merge	
July 28	Dexys	The Feminine Divine		100% Records	
July 28	Eric Johanson	The Deep and the Dirty	Blues rock	Ruf	
July 28	From Ashes to New	Blackout		Better Noise	
July 28	George Clanton	Ooh Rap I Ya		100% Electronica	
July 28	Georgia	Euphoric	Dance-pop, electropop	Domino	
July 28	Girlschool	Wtfortyfive?			
July 28	Mutoid Man	Mutants		Sargent House	
July 28	Post Malone	Austin	Pop, synth-pop, alternative rock	Mercury, Republic	
July 28	Sevendust	Truth Killer	Alternative metal, hard rock	Napalm	
July 28	Signs of the Swarm	Amongst the Low & Empty	Deathcore	Century Media	
July 28	Travis Scott	Utopia	Alternative hip-hop, experimental	Cactus Jack, Epic	
July 28	Treasure	Reboot		YG, Columbia	

=== August ===
List of albums released in August 2023
Go to: January | February | March | April | May | June | July | August | September | October | November | December | Back to top
Release date	Artist	Album	Genre	Label	Ref.
August 1	The Maine	The Maine	Pop rock	8123 Records, Photo Finish	
August 3	Grupo Frontera	El Comienzo	Mexican cumbia, norteño	VHR Music	
August 3	Iza	Afrodhit	R&B, pop, trap	Warner Music	
August 4	Chris Farren	Doom Singer	Indie pop	Polyvinyl	
August 4	Fanny Lumsden	Hey Dawn		Cooking Vinyl Australia	
August 4	Florry	The Holey Bible	Country rock	Dear Life Records	
August 4	The Front Bottoms	You Are Who You Hang Out With		Fueled by Ramen	
August 4	Girl Ray	Prestige		Moshi Moshi	
August 4	Mammoth WVH	Mammoth II	Rock	BMG	
August 4	Miles Kane	One Man Band	Indie rock	Modern Sky	
August 4	Skindred	Smile	Alternative metal	Earache	
August 4	Teenage Wrist	Still Love	Alternative rock, grunge, shoegaze	Epitaph	
August 4	Yo Gotti and DJ Drama	I Showed U So			
August 10	Clarice Falcão	Truque		Chevalier de Pas	
August 11	Bonnie "Prince" Billy	Keeping Secrets Will Destroy You		Drag City	
August 11	Fredo	Unfinished Business			
August 11	G Flip	Drummer		Future Classic	
August 11	The Hives	The Death of Randy Fitzsimmons	Garage rock revival	Disques Hives	
August 11	Jungle	Volcano		Caiola Records, AWAL	
August 11	Karol G	Mañana Será Bonito (Bichota Season)	Reggaeton, Latin trap	Interscope	
August 11	Laura Groves	Radio Red	Pop	Bella Union	
August 11	Liam Gallagher	Knebworth 22		Warner	
August 11	Move	Black Radical Love	Hardcore punk	Triple-B Records	
August 11	Neal Morse	The Dreamer – Joseph: Part One	Progressive rock, rock opera	Frontiers	
August 11	Neil Young	Chrome Dreams	Folk rock, country rock	Reprise, Warner	
August 11	Noname	Sundial		Noname	
August 11	Public Image Ltd	End of World		PiL Official	
August 11	Reason	Porches		TDE	
August 11	The Sherlocks	People Like Me & You			
August 11	Starbenders	Take Back the Night			
August 11	Trippie Redd	A Love Letter to You 5		10K, 1400 Entertainment	
August 13	Jelena Karleuša	Alpha	Electropop, hyperpop, hip-hop	JK Entertainment, Virgin	
August 17	Anitta	Funk Generation: A Favela Love Story		Warner	
August 17	Rhiannon Giddens	You're the One	Americana	Nonesuch	
August 18	Addison Rae	AR	Pop	Sandlot Records	
August 18	As Friends Rust	Any Joy		End Hits	
August 18	Birdy	Portraits	Pop, synth-pop	Atlantic	
August 18	Bobby Rush	All My Love for You	Blues	Deep Rush	
August 18	Ciara	CiCi	R&B	Beauty Marks	
August 18	Dan Sultan	Dan Sultan		Liberation Music	
August 18	Dizzy	Dizzy		Communion Records	
August 18	DJ Diesel	Gorilla Warfare	Dubstep	Monstercat	
August 18	Fiddlehead	Death Is Nothing to Us	Post-hardcore, alternative rock, emo	Run for Cover	
August 18	Francisca Valenzuela	Adentro	Alternative rock, pop rock	Frantastic Records	
August 18	Genesis Owusu	Struggler		Ourness, AWAL	
August 18	Giggs	Zero Tolerance			
August 18	Grace Potter	Mother Road		Fantasy	
August 18	Gregory Alan Isakov	Appaloosa Bones		Dualtone	
August 18	Gretta Ray	Positive Spin		EMI	
August 18	Hozier	Unreal Unearth		Rubyworks, Island, Columbia	
August 18	Idina Menzel	Drama Queen		BMG	
August 18	Jihyo	Zone		JYP, Republic	
August 18	Jon Batiste	World Music Radio		Verve, Interscope	
August 18	Mick Jenkins	The Patience	Hip-hop	RBC, BMG	
August 18	Orbit Culture	Descent	Melodic death metal, groove metal, heavy metal	Seek & Strike	
August 18	Osees	Intercepted Message	Synth-rock	In the Red	
August 18	Panda Bear, Sonic Boom, and Adrian Sherwood	Reset in Dub	Dub	Domino	
August 18	Quavo	Rocket Power	Hip-hop, trap	Capitol, Motown, Quality Control	
August 18	Reneé Rapp	Snow Angel		Interscope	
August 18	Shamir	Homo Anxietatem		Kill Rock Stars	
August 18	Tia Gostelow	Head Noise		Lovely Records	
August 18	The View	Exorcism of Youth	Indie rock	Cooking Vinyl	
August 18	Worm Shepherd	The Sleeping Sun		Unique Leader Records	
August 18	The Xcerts	Learning How to Live and Let Go		UNFD	
August 22	Dethklok	Dethalbum IV	Melodic death metal	WaterTower	
August 23	Ai	Respect All		EMI	
August 24	Burna Boy	I Told Them...		Atlantic, Spaceship	
August 25	Alice Cooper	Road	Hard rock, heavy metal	earMusic	
August 25	The Armed	Perfect Saviors		Sargent House	
August 25	Ashnikko	Weedkiller	Nu metal, trap, industrial pop	Parlophone, Warner	
August 25	Asking Alexandria	Where Do We Go from Here?	Melodic metalcore, alternative metal	Better Noise	
August 25	Be Your Own Pet	Mommy		Third Man	
August 25	Buck Meek	Haunted Mountain	Alt-country	4AD	
August 25	Candlebox	The Long Goodbye		Round Hill	
August 25	The Cat Empire	Where the Angels Fall		Two Shoes	
August 25	Charli XCX and Leo Birenberg	Bottoms (Original Motion Picture Score)		Milan	
August 25	Cindy Wilson	Realms	Electronic, pop	Kill Rock Stars	
August 25	Danger Mouse and Jemini	Born Again	Hip-hop	Lex	
August 25	Earl Sweatshirt and the Alchemist	Voir Dire	Hip-hop	Tan Cressida, ALC Records, Gala Music	
August 25	Filter	The Algorithm	Industrial rock, alternative rock, hard rock	Golden Robot Records	
August 25	Georgia Mooney	Full of Moon		Nettwerk	
August 25	A Giant Dog	Bite	Glam rock, garage rock	Merge	
August 25	Holding Absence	The Noble Art of Self Destruction		SharpTone	
August 25	Incantation	Unholy Deification		Relapse	
August 25	Islands	And That's Why Dolphins Lost Their Legs			
August 25	Jaboukie	All Who Can't Hear Must Feel		Interscope	
August 25	Jaimie Branch	Fly or Die Fly or Die Fly or Die (World War)	Punk jazz	International Anthem	
August 25	Kill the Noise	Hollow World		Ophelia	
August 25	Lars Eric Mattsson	Evolution		Lion Music	
August 25	Nellie McKay	Hey Guys, Watch This		Hungry Mouse Records	
August 25	Open Mike Eagle	Another Triumph of Ghetto Engineering	Hip-hop	Auto Reverse Records	
August 25	Ratboys	The Window	Alternative country, roots rock	Topshelf	
August 25	Spanish Love Songs	No Joy		Pure Noise	
August 25	Spellling	Spellling & the Mystery School		Sacred Bones	
August 25	Terrace Martin and James Fauntleroy	Nova		BMG	
August 25	Tim McGraw	Standing Room Only	Country	Big Machine	
August 25	Turnpike Troubadours	A Cat in the Rain			
August 25	Tyler Joe Miller	Spillin' My Truth	Country	MDM	
August 25	U.D.O.	Touchdown		Atomic Fire	
August 25	Victoria Monét	Jaguar II	R&B	Lovett Music, RCA	
August 25	The Word Alive	Hard Reset	Melodic metalcore	Thriller	
August 25	Wreckless Eric	Leisureland		Tapete	
August 25	Zach Bryan	Zach Bryan	Country, country rock	Belting Bronco, Warner	
August 28	NCT	Golden Age	Hip-hop, R&B, EDM	SM, Kakao	
August 29	Luísa Sonza	Escândalo Íntimo	Pop	Sony Music Brazil	
August 30	Jharrel Jerome	Rap Pack		Sony Music	
August 30	Milet	5am		SME Japan	
August 31	Jeff Rosenstock	Hellmode	Punk rock	Polyvinyl	

=== September ===
List of albums released in September 2023
Go to: January | February | March | April | May | June | July | August | September | October | November | December | Back to top
Release date	Artist	Album	Genre	Label	Ref.
September 1	Frankie and the Witch Fingers	Data Doom		Greenway Records	
September 1	Icona Pop	Club Romantech		TEN, Ultra	
September 1	Midwxst	E3		Geffen	
September 1	The Paper Kites	At the Roadhouse		Wonderlick	
September 1	Phil Campbell and the Bastard Sons	Kings of the Asylum		Nuclear Blast	
September 1	Polaris	Fatalism	Metalcore	Resist Records, SharpTone	
September 1	Primal Fear	Code Red	Heavy metal, power metal	Atomic Fire	
September 1	Royal Blood	Back to the Water Below	Rock	Warner	
September 1	Slowdive	Everything Is Alive	Shoegaze	Dead Oceans	
September 1	Smoke DZA and Flying Lotus	Flying Objects		The Smoker's Club	
September 1	Soen	Memorial	Progressive metal, progressive rock, alternative metal	Silver Lining Music	
September 1	Speedy Ortiz	Rabbit Rabbit	Indie rock	Wax Nine Records	
September 1	Spirit of the Beehive	I'm So Lucky		Saddle Creek	
September 5	Tirzah	Trip9love		Domino	
September 8	Alabaster DePlume	Come with Fierce Grace	Jazz	International Anthem	
September 8	Allison Russell	The Returner	R&B, Americana	Fantasy	
September 8	Angel Dust	Brand New Soul		Pop Wig Records	
September 8	Anjimile	The King		4AD	
September 8	Ashley McBryde	The Devil I Know	Country rock	Warner Music Nashville	
September 8	The Chemical Brothers	For That Beautiful Feeling	Electronica	EMI	
September 8	Courtney Barnett	End of the Day		Milk!, Mom + Pop Music	
September 8	D4vd	The Lost Petals		Darkroom, Interscope	
September 8	Darcy James Argue	Dynamic Maximum Tension	Jazz	Nonesuch	
September 8	Irreversible Entanglements	Protect Your Light		Impulse!	
September 8	Jalen Ngonda	Come Around and Love Me	Soul, R&B, rock	Daptone	
September 8	James Blake	Playing Robots into Heaven	Electronic	Republic	
September 8	Joan Osborne	Nobody Owns You	Americana, roots rock	Womanly Hips	
September 8	Joey Valence & Brae	Punk Tactics	Rap rock, punk rap, hardcore hip-hop	JVB Records	
September 8	Kristin Hersh	Clear Pond Road		Fire	
September 8	Kvelertak	Endling		Rise	
September 8	Laufey	Bewitched	Jazz pop	AWAL	
September 8	Lil Peep and iLoveMakonnen	Diamonds		AWAL	
September 8	Mustard Plug	Where Did All My Friends Go?		Bad Time Records	
September 8	Olivia Rodrigo	Guts	Pop, rock	Geffen	
September 8	Proper	Part-Timer		Father/Daughter	
September 8	Puddle of Mudd	Ubiquitous	Post-grunge, hard rock	Pavement Entertainment	
September 8	Róisín Murphy	Hit Parade	Pop	Ninja Tune	
September 8	Romy	Mid Air	Dance-pop	Young	
September 8	Saliva	Revelation			
September 8	Sparklehorse	Bird Machine		Anti-	
September 8	The String Cheese Incident	Lend Me a Hand			
September 8	Sylosis	A Sign of Things to Come	Melodic death metal, metalcore, thrash metal	Nuclear Blast	
September 8	Teezo Touchdown	How Do You Sleep at Night?	Experimental hip-hop	Not Fit for Society, RCA	
September 8	Tinashe	BB/Ang3l	Alternative R&B, UK garage, drum and bass	Tinashe Music, Nice Life	
September 8	Tyler Childers	Rustin' in the Rain	Country, honky-tonk, neotraditional country	Hickman Holler Records, RCA	
September 8	V	Layover	Pop, R&B, jazz	Big Hit Music	
September 8	Yussef Dayes	Black Classical Music	Jazz	Brownswood, Nonesuch	
September 8	ZZ Ward	Dirty Shine	Blues rock	Dirty Shine Records	
September 9	Pain of Truth	Not Through Blood	New York hardcore	DAZE	
September 11	Cravity	Sun Seeker		Starship	
September 11	Key	Good & Great	K-pop	SM	
September 13	Odetari	XIII Sorrows	EDM	Artist Partner Group	
September 14	Nas and Hit-Boy	Magic 3	Hip-hop	Mass Appeal	
September 15	Alan Palomo	World of Hassle	Experimental pop	Mom + Pop	
September 15	Ash	Race the Night	Pop-punk	Fierce Panda	
September 15	Bahamas	Bootcut	Country		
September 15	Barenaked Ladies	In Flight	Pop rock	Raisin' Records	
September 15	Baroness	Stone	Progressive metal, alternative metal	Abraxan Hymns	
September 15	Brian Setzer	The Devil Always Collects			
September 15	The Beaches	Blame My Ex	Rock	The Beaches	
September 15	Brothers Osborne	Brothers Osborne	Country rock	EMI Nashville	
September 15	Christone "Kingfish" Ingram	Live in London	Blues	Alligator	
September 15	Cody Fry	The End	Symphonic pop, pop rock	Decca	
September 15	C.O.F.F.I.N	Australia Stops		Damaged Record Co.	
September 15	Corey Taylor	CMF2	Hard rock, alternative metal, post-grunge	BMG	
September 15	Corinne Bailey Rae	Black Rainbows	R&B, garage rock	Black Rainbows Music, Thirty Tigers	
September 15	Dan + Shay	Bigger Houses		Warner Nashville	
September 15	Danko Jones	Electric Sounds		AFM, Sonic Unyon	
September 15	Dean Brody	Right Round Here	Country	Starseed Records	
September 15	Demi Lovato	Revamped	Rock	Island	
September 15	Diddy	The Love Album: Off the Grid	R&B	Love, Motown	
September 15	Droeloe	The Art of Change			
September 15	Elisapie	Inuktitut	Pop	Bonsound	
September 15	Explosions in the Sky	End	Post-rock	Temporary Residence	
September 15	The Hoosiers	Confidence	Indie pop	Crab Race	
September 15	Joshua Redman	Where Are We	Jazz	Blue Note	
September 15	Just Honest	No Love No Hate	Alternative pop		
September 15	K.Flay	Mono	Indie rock, pop-punk, alternative rock	Giant Music, BMG	
September 15	Madison Beer	Silence Between Songs	Pop, psychedelic rock	Epic, Sing It Loud	
September 15	Maren Morris	The Bridge		Columbia	
September 15	Margo Cilker	Valley of Heart's Delight	Americana	Fluff & Gravy	
September 15	Mitski	The Land Is Inhospitable and So Are We	Americana, country, orchestral pop	Dead Oceans	
September 15	Molybaron	Something Ominous		Inside Out	
September 15	Nasty C	I Love It Here	Hip-hop	Universal Music South Africa, Def Jam	
September 15	Nation of Language	Strange Disciple		PIAS	
September 15	Needtobreathe	Caves	Pop, Southern rock	Drive All Night	
September 15	Octo Octa	Dreams of a Dancefloor		T4T LUV NRG	
September 15	The Pretenders	Relentless		Parlophone	
September 15	The Record Company	The 4th Album		Round Hill	
September 15	RL Grime	Play		Sable Valley Records	
September 15	Rod Wave	Nostalgia	Hip-hop, R&B	Alamo	
September 15	San Holo	Existential Dance Music		Helix Records	
September 15	Shakey Graves	Movie of the Week		Dualtone	
September 15	Sydney Sprague	Somebody in Hell Loves You		Rude	
September 15	Teddy Swims	I've Tried Everything but Therapy (Part 1)		Warner	
September 15	Tesseract	War of Being	Progressive metal, djent	Kscope	
September 15	Thirty Seconds to Mars	It's the End of the World but It's a Beautiful Day	Pop, electronica	Concord	
September 15	Tomb Mold	The Enduring Spirit	Death metal	20 Buck Spin	
September 15	Vagabon	Sorry I Haven't Called		Nonesuch	
September 15	Vic Mensa	Victor		Roc Nation	
September 15	Willie Nelson	Bluegrass	Bluegrass, country	Legacy	
September 15	Woods	Perennial	Indie rock	Woodsist	
September 15	Worriers	Trust Your Gut		Ernest Jenning	
September 18	Kim Petras	Problématique	Dance-pop	Amigo Records, Republic	
September 18	The National	Laugh Track	Indie rock	4AD	
September 20	Eartheater	Powders	Trip hop	Chemical X, Mad Decent	
September 20	JO1	Equinox	J-pop	Lapone	
September 22	3Teeth	EndEx	Industrial metal	Century Media	
September 22	Aitana	Alpha	Electropop	Universal Spain	
September 22	Anastacia	Our Songs		Stars by Edel	
September 22	Brent Cobb	Southern Star		Ol' Buddy Records, Thirty Tigers	
September 22	Bleach Lab	Lost in a Rush of Emptiness	Shoegaze, dream pop, indie rock	Nettwerk	
September 22	Cannibal Corpse	Chaos Horrific	Death metal	Metal Blade	
September 22	Chai	Chai	City pop	Sub Pop, SME Japan	
September 22	Chappell Roan	The Rise and Fall of a Midwest Princess	Pop	Island, Amusement Records	
September 22	Devendra Banhart	Flying Wig		Mexican Summer	
September 22	Doja Cat	Scarlet	Hip-hop	Kemosabe, RCA	
September 22	EarthGang	EarthGang vs the Algorithm: RIP Human Art		Dreamville	
September 22	Grails	Anches En Maat		Temporary Residence	
September 22	Holy Holy	Cellophane		Wonderlick, Sony Music Australia	
September 22	Jauz	Wrath of the Wicked			
September 22	Jenny Owen Youngs	Avalanche		Yep Roc	
September 22	K-Trap and Headie One	Strength to Strength		One Records, Thousand8	
September 22	KEN Mode	Void		Artoffact	
September 22	Kylie Minogue	Tension	Dance-pop, electropop, synth-pop	BMG, Darenote	
September 22	Laurel Halo	Atlas	Ambient, minimalist	Awe Records	
September 22	Lil Tecca	Tec	Trap	Galactic, Republic	
September 22	Loraine James	Gentle Confrontation	Electronic	Hyperdub	
September 22	Lsdxoxo	Delusions of Grandeur (D.O.G.)		Fantasy Audio Group	
September 22	Lydia Loveless	Nothing's Gonna Stand in My Way Again		Bloodshot	
September 22	Mike, Wiki, and the Alchemist	Faith Is a Rock	Hip-hop	ALC Records	
September 22	Mykki Blanco	Postcards from Italia		Transgressive	
September 22	Pkew pkew pkew	Siiick Days		Stomp Records	
September 22	Roosevelt	Embrace		Counter Records, Ninja Tune	
September 22	Safia	A Lover's Guide to a Lucid Dream		Safia, Warner Music Australia	
September 22	Slaughter Beach, Dog	Crying, Laughing, Waving, Smiling		Lame-O	
September 22	Slayyyter	Starfucker	Electropop	Fader	
September 22	Soccer Mommy	Karaoke Night		Loma Vista	
September 22	Staind	Confessions of the Fallen	Alternative metal, post-grunge	Yap'em, Inc., Alchemy Recordings, BMG	
September 22	Stephen Sanchez	Angel Face		Mercury, Republic	
September 22	Teenage Fanclub	Nothing Lasts Forever		PeMa, Merge	
September 22	Thy Art Is Murder	Godlike	Deathcore	Human Warfare	
September 22	Underscores	Wallsocket		Mom + Pop Music	
September 22	Various artists	More than a Whisper: Celebrating the Music of Nanci Griffith	Folk, Americana, country folk	Rounder	
September 22	Will Butler + Sister Squares	Will Butler + Sister Squares		Merge	
September 22	The Wytches	Our Guest Can't Be Named	Rock	Alcopop!	
September 22	Yeule	Softscars		Ninja Tune	
September 22	Zach Bryan	Boys of Faith	Folk, Americana	Belting Bronco, Warner	
September 27	Kamaal Williams	Stings		Black Focus	
September 27	XG	New DNA	Pop, hip-hop, R&B	Xgalx	
September 28	Becky G	Esquinas	Latin pop, regional Mexican	Kemosabe, RCA, Sony Music Latin	
September 29	'68	Yes, And...		Pure Noise	
September 29	Animal Collective	Isn't It Now?	Experimental rock, neo-psychedeila	Domino	
September 29	Armand Hammer	We Buy Diabetic Test Strips	Experimental hip-hop, conscious hip-hop	Fat Possum	
September 29	Beverley Knight	The Fifth Chapter		Tag8 Music, BMG	
September 29	Black Stone Cherry	Screamin' at the Sky		Mascot	
September 29	Blonde Redhead	Sit Down for Dinner		Section1	
September 29	Blood Command	World Domination		Hassle, Loyal Blood	
September 29	Cherry Glazerr	I Don't Want You Anymore	Indie rock	Secretly Canadian	
September 29	Code Orange	The Above	Alternative metal, metalcore	Blue Grape Music	
September 29	David Eugene Edwards	Hyacinth		Sargent House	
September 29	Del Water Gap	I Miss You Already + I Haven't Left Yet		Mom + Pop Music	
September 29	Dope Lemon	Kimosabè		BMG	
September 29	Ed Sheeran	Autumn Variations	Folk	Gingerbread Man	
September 29	Fefe Dobson	Emotion Sickness		21 Entertainment	
September 29	Heavy Lungs	All Gas No Brakes	Grunge, post-punk	Alcopop!	
September 29	Hemlocke Springs	Going...Going...Gone!	Indie pop	Good Luck Have Fun Records	
September 29	James Johnston	Raised Like That	Country	James Johnston Music	
September 29	Jade Eagleson	Do It Anyway	Country, neotraditional country	Starseed Records	
September 29	Jlin	Perspective		Planet Mu	
September 29	Jorja Smith	Falling or Flying	R&B	FAMM	
September 29	KMRU	Dissolution Grip	Ambient	OFNOT	
September 29	Lil Wayne	Tha Fix Before Tha VI		Young Money, Republic	
September 29	Lindsay Lou	Queen of Time		Kill Rock Stars Nashville	
September 29	LP	Love Lines	Pop rock, indie pop, Latin music	BMG	
September 29	Luca Brasi	The World Don't Owe You Anything		Cooking Vinyl Australia	
September 29	Mae Muller	Sorry I'm Late	Pop	Capitol, EMI	
September 29	Matana Roberts	Coin Coin Chapter Five: In the Garden		Constellation	
September 29	Oliver Tree	Alone in a Crowd		Atlantic	
September 29	Oneohtrix Point Never	Again	Experimental, electronic	Warp	
September 29	Steven Wilson	The Harmony Codex	Art rock, electronica	Virgin, Spinefarm	
September 29	Slow Pulp	Yard		Anti-	
September 29	Thanks for Coming	What Is My Capacity to Love?	Indie rock	Danger Collective Records	
September 29	Thank You, I'm Sorry	Growing in Strange Places		Count Your Lucky Stars	
September 29	Wilco	Cousin	Art pop, art rock, indie rock	dBpm	
September 29	Wolves in the Throne Room	Crypt of Ancestral Knowledge		Relapse	

== Fourth quarter ==
=== October ===
List of albums released in October 2023
Go to: January | February | March | April | May | June | July | August | September | October | November | December | Back to top
Release date	Artist	Album	Genre	Label	Ref.
October 2	R.A.P. Ferreira	Asiatique Black Wizard Lily Funk		Ruby Yacht	
October 4	Yoasobi	The Book 3	J-pop, electropop, synth-pop	Sony Music Japan	
October 6	A. Savage	Several Songs About Fire		Rough Trade	
October 6	Burner Herzog	Random Person	Indie rock	Take a Turn Records	
October 6	Carnifex	Necromanteum	Deathcore, symphonic black metal	Nuclear Blast	
October 6	Cevin Key	Brap and Forth, Vol. 9			
October 6	Citizen	Calling the Dogs	Alternative rock	Run for Cover	
October 6	Claire Rosinkranz	Just Because		Republic	
October 6	Colbie Caillat	Along the Way	Country	Blue Jean Baby Records	
October 6	Darius Rucker	Carolyn's Boy	Country	Capitol Nashville	
October 6	Dogstar	Somewhere Between the Power Lines and Palm Trees	Rock	Dillon Street Records	
October 6	Dorian Electra	Fanfare	Electropop, hyperpop		
October 6	Drake	For All the Dogs	Hip-hop, trap, R&B	OVO, Republic	
October 6	Glasser	Crux		One Little Independent	
October 6	Hannah Diamond	Perfect Picture	Hyperpop	PC Music	
October 6	Iron Savior	Firestar	Power metal, speed metal	AFM	
October 6	Jeremy Dutcher	Motewolonuwok		Secret City	
October 6	Joe Bonamassa	Blues Deluxe Vol. 2	Blues rock	J&R Adventures, Provogue	
October 6	Jolie Holland	Haunted Mountain			
October 6	The Kite String Tangle	Lustre		Warner Music Australia	
October 6	Mary Lattimore	Goodbye, Hotel Arkada		Ghostly	
October 6	Mitch Rowland	Come June		Giant Music, Erskine Records	
October 6	Of Mice & Men	Tether	Metalcore	SharpTone	
October 6	Old Dominion	Memory Lane	Country	RCA Nashville	
October 6	Paramore	Re: This Is Why		Atlantic	
October 6	Pitbull	Trackhouse			
October 6	Prong	State of Emergency		Napalm	
October 6	Reba McEntire	Not That Fancy			
October 6	Roger Waters	The Dark Side of the Moon Redux	Art rock	SGB Music, Cooking Vinyl	
October 6	The Rural Alberta Advantage	The Rise & the Fall		Saddle Creek, Paper Bag	
October 6	Russell Morris	The Real Thing: Symphonic Concert		Ambition Records	
October 6	The Screaming Jets	Professional Misconduct		Shine On Records	
October 6	Short Fictions	Oblivion Will Own Me and Death Alone Will Love Me (Void Filler)		Lauren	
October 6	Slauson Malone 1	Excelsior		Warp	
October 6	Sufjan Stevens	Javelin	Indie folk	Asthmatic Kitty	
October 6	Svalbard	The Weight of the Mask	Post-hardcore, post-metal	Nuclear Blast	
October 6	Teen Jesus and the Jean Teasers	I Love You	Punk rock, bubblegum	Domestic La La	
October 6	Vanishing Twin	Afternoon X		Fire	
October 6	Will Sparks	Accepted Concept		Clubwrk Records	
October 13	Bad Bunny	Nadie Sabe Lo Que Va a Pasar Mañana		Rimas	
October 13	Beartooth	The Surface	Alternative metal, metalcore, post-hardcore	Red Bull	
October 13	Blue October	Spinning the Truth Around Part 2	Alternative rock	Up/Down Records	
October 13	Boygenius	The Rest	Indie folk	Interscope	
October 13	CMAT	Crazymad, for Me	Pop, country	CMATBaby, AWAL	
October 13	Cobrah	Succubus		Gagball, APG, Big Beat	
October 13	Creeper	Sanguivore	Gothic rock	Spinefarm	
October 13	Crosses	Goodnight, God Bless, I Love U, Delete.		Warner	
October 13	Cybotron	Maintain the Golden Ratio		Tresor	
October 13	Diesel	Bootleg Melancholy		Bloodlines Music	
October 13	The Drums	Jonny		Anti-	
October 13	The Feelies	Some Kinda Love: Performing the Music of The Velvet Underground		Bar/None	
October 13	Flamingods	Head of Pomegranate			
October 13	Helena Deland	Goodnight Summerland		Chivi Chivi Records	
October 13	Holly Humberstone	Paint My Bedroom Black	Pop	Polydor, Geffen	
October 13	Ive	I've Mine	K-pop	Starship	
October 13	Jamila Woods	Water Made Us	R&B, neo soul	Jagjaguwar	
October 13	Jenn Champion	The Last Night of Sadness			
October 13	Ken Carson	A Great Chaos	Rage	Opium, Interscope	
October 13	L'Rain	I Killed Your Dog		Mexican Summer	
October 13	Maple Glider	I Get into Trouble		Pieater, Partisan	
October 13	Margo Price	Strays II		Loma Vista	
October 13	Meduza	Meduza		UMG	
October 13	The Menzingers	Some of It Was True		Epitaph	
October 13	Metric	Formentera II	Indie rock, synth-pop, dream pop	Metric Music International, Thirty Tigers	
October 13	Mike	Burning Desire		10K	
October 13	Nate Husser	Dark Songs to Drive To		+1, 300	
October 13	Offset	Set It Off	Hip-hop, trap	Motown	
October 13	Pinkshift	Suraksha		Hopeless	
October 13	Ratcat	All Stripped Back			
October 13	Ren	Sick Boi		The Other Songs	
October 13	Rick Astley	Are We There Yet?		BMG	
October 13	Ringo Starr	Rewind Forward	Rock	UMe	
October 13	Ronnie Atkins	Trinity	Hard rock, heavy metal	Frontiers	
October 13	Spencer Krug	I Just Drew This Knife			
October 13	Squirrel Flower	Tomorrow's Fire	Indie rock	Polyvinyl	
October 13	The Streets	The Darker the Shadow the Brighter the Light		679, Warner Music UK	
October 13	Tomorrow X Together	The Name Chapter: Freefall	K-pop	Big Hit	
October 13	Troye Sivan	Something to Give Each Other	Pop, synth-pop, house	Capitol	
October 13	Twin Temple	God Is Dead			
October 13	Westside Gunn	And Then You Pray for Me	Hip-hop, trap, boom bap	Griselda, Empire	
October 13	Wheatus	Just a Dirtbag Christmas		Sony Music	
October 17	Gucci Mane	Breath of Fresh Air		Atlantic, 1017	
October 17	Olof Dreijer	Rosa Rugosa		Hessle Audio	
October 18	Ai Furihata	Super Moon		Purple One Star	
October 18	Chuu	Howl		ATRP, KT Genie	
October 18	Itzy	Ringo		Warner Japan	
October 20	A-Reece	P2: The Big Hearted Bad Guy	Hip-hop	Revenge Club Records	
October 20	Alabama 3	Cold War Classics Vol. 2			
October 20	Awakebutstillinbed	Chaos Takes the Wheel and I Am a Passenger		Tiny Engines	
October 20	Bad Rabbits	Garden of Eden			
October 20	Blink-182	One More Time...	Punk rock, pop-punk	Columbia	
October 20	Bombay Bicycle Club	My Big Day		AWAL, Mmm... Records, Island	
October 20	Boys Like Girls	Sunday at Foxwoods	Pop rock	Fearless, Concord	
October 20	Brandon Lake	Coat of Many Colors	Contemporary worship, CCM, Christian rock	Provident	
October 20	Cher	Christmas	Christmas	Warner	
October 20	Chris Shiflett	Lost at Sea		Blue Élan	
October 20	Cirith Ungol	Dark Parade		Metal Blade	
October 20	City Girls	RAW		Quality Control Music, Motown	
October 20	Clowns	Endless	Hardcore punk, crossover thrash	Damaged Records, Fat Wreck Chords	
October 20	Dave Harrington	The Pictures		Minaret Records	
October 20	Dhani Harrison	Innerstanding		BMG, H.O.T. Records	
October 20	Dog Eat Dog	Free Radicals		Metalville Records	
October 20	Duff McKagan	Lighthouse		The World Is Flat	
October 20	Emma Anderson	Pearlies	Dream pop	Sonic Cathedral	
October 20	Evian Christ	Revanchist	Trance	Warp	
October 20	Forest Swords	Bolted		Ninja Tune	
October 20	Fuerza Regida	Pa Las Baby's y Belikeada		Rancho Humilde, Street Mob Records, Sony Music Latin	
October 20	Glen Hansard	All That Was East Is West of Me Now		Anti-	
October 20	Gold Dime	No More Blue Skies		No Gold	
October 20	Ho99o9	Territory: Turf Talk, Vol. II			
October 20	James Barker Band	Ahead of Our Time	Country	Records Nashville	
October 20	Jane Remover	Census Designated	Shoegaze, post-rock	DeadAir	
October 20	Knuckle Puck	Losing What We Love		Pure Noise	
October 20	Lost Girls (Jenny Hval and Håvard Volden)	Selvutsletter		Smalltown Supersound	
October 20	Pip Blom	Bobbie		Heavenly	
October 20	Priya Ragu	Santhosam		Warner	
October 20	Reverend Kristin Michael Hayter	Saved!	Avant-garde	Perpetual Flames Ministries	
October 20	Rival Sons	Lightbringer		Atlantic	
October 20	Robbie Robertson	Killers of the Flower Moon		Sony Masterworks	
October 20	The Rolling Stones	Hackney Diamonds	Blues rock	Polydor, Geffen	
October 20	Sampha	Lahai	Alternative R&B, soul, electronic	Young	
October 20	Will Joseph Cook	Novella		Bad Hotel	
October 20	Within Temptation	Bleed Out		Force Music Recordings	
October 23	Seventeen	Seventeenth Heaven	K-pop	Pledis	
October 27	The American Analog Set	For Forever			
October 27	Angie McMahon	Light, Dark, Light Again		AWAL	
October 27	Baby Tate	Baby Tate Presents - Sexploration: The Musical		Warner	
October 27	BabyTron	MegaTron 2			
October 27	Black Pumas	Chronicles of a Diamond		ATO	
October 27	Brent Faiyaz	Larger than Life		ISO Supremacy, UnitedMasters	
October 27	Carla Geneve	Hertz		Dot Dash	
October 27	Circus Devils	Squeeze the Needle		Guided by Voices, Inc.	
October 27	Closure in Moscow	Soft Hell		Bird's Robe Records	
October 27	Dallas Smith	Dallas Smith	Country, country rock, alternative rock	Big Loud	
October 27	DJ Shadow	Action Adventure		Mass Appeal, Liquid Amber Records	
October 27	Dokken	Heaven Comes Down	Hard rock, glam metal, heavy metal	Silver Lining Music	
October 27	Dollar Signs	Legend Tripping			
October 27	Doro	Conqueress Forever Strong & Proud		Nuclear Blast	
October 27	Duran Duran	Danse Macabre	Synth-pop, dance-rock, pop rock	BMG, Tape Modern	
October 27	The Gaslight Anthem	History Books	Heartland rock, indie rock	Rich Mahogany Records	
October 27	In This Moment	Godmode	Industrial, industrial metal, alternative metal	BMG	
October 27	James Blunt	Who We Used to Be		Atlantic	
October 27	Jessi Colter	Edge of Forever		Appalachian Records	
October 27	Jon Pardi	Merry Christmas from Jon Pardi		Capitol Nashville	
October 27	The Kills	God Games	Rock	Domino	
October 27	King Gizzard & the Lizard Wizard	The Silver Cord	Electropop	KGLW	
October 27	Mariah the Scientist	To Be Eaten Alive	R&B	Buckles Laboratories, Epic	
October 27	Marina Herlop	Nekkuja		Pan	
October 27	Mark Tremonti	Christmas Classics New & Old			
October 27	ML Buch	Suntub	Art rock, soft rock	15 Love	
October 27	The Mountain Goats	Jenny from Thebes	Alternative rock	Merge	
October 27	Orchestral Manoeuvres in the Dark	Bauhaus Staircase	Synth-pop	White Noise Records	
October 27	Pattern-Seeking Animals	Spooky Action at a Distance		Inside Out	
October 27	Poppy	Zig	Dark pop, electropop, alternative pop	Sumerian	
October 27	Robin Trower featuring Sari Schorr	Joyful Sky		Provogue, Mascot	
October 27	Samara Joy	A Joyful Holiday	Christmas, gospel, vocal jazz	Verve	
October 27	Shabazz Palaces	Robed in Rareness		Sub Pop	
October 27	Sofia Kourtesis	Madres	Latin house, deep house	Ninja Tune	
October 27	Sundara Karma	Better Luck Next Time	Indie rock, alternative rock	Is Right Records	
October 27	Taking Back Sunday	152	Alternative rock, pop rock	Fantasy	
October 27	Taylor Swift	1989 (Taylor's Version)	Synth-pop	Republic	
October 27	Wargasm	Venom		Slowplay, Republic	
October 27	Wild Nothing	Hold	Synth-pop, sophisti-pop, dream pop	Captured Tracks	
October 31	Lloyd Banks	Halloween Havoc IV: The 72nd Hr			

=== November ===
List of albums released in November 2023
Go to: January | February | March | April | May | June | July | August | September | October | November | December | Back to top
Release date	Artist	Album	Genre	Label	Ref.
November 1	Chloe Flower	Chloe Hearts Christmas		Sony Masterworks	
November 1	U.S. Girls	Lives		4AD	
November 2	Emilia	.MP3		Sony Music Latin, WK Records	
November 3	Actress	LXXXVIII	Electronic, experimental techno	Ninja Tune	
November 3	The Alchemist	Flying High, Part Two			
November 3	Bad Wolves	Die About It		Better Noise	
November 3	Bar Italia	The Twits		Matador	
November 3	Calboy	Unchained		Loyalty & Company	
November 3	Cold War Kids	Cold War Kids		AWAL	
November 3	Darude	Together		Vibing Out	
November 3	Dirty Honey	Can't Find the Brakes			
November 3	Drop Nineteens	Hard Light	Shoegaze	Wharf Cat Records	
November 3	The Embassy	E-Numbers		Dream On Records	
November 3	Gregory Porter	Christmas Wish		Blue Note, Decca	
November 3	Ian Sweet	Sucker	Bedroom pop, indie folk	Polyvinyl	
November 3	Jason Aldean	Highway Desperado	Country rock	Broken Bow	
November 3	Jason Martin	A Compton Story, Pt. 1			
November 3	Jean-Michel Jarre	Oxymoreworks			
November 3	Jeezy	I Might Forgive... But I Don't Forget		CTE New World, Stem Records	
November 3	Jimmy Buffett	Equal Strain on All Parts		Mailboat, Sun	
November 3	Jockstrap	I<3UQTINVU		Rough Trade	
November 3	Jungkook	Golden	Pop	Big Hit	
November 3	Kevin Abstract	Blanket		Video Store, RCA	
November 3	Kevin Drew	Aging		Arts & Crafts	
November 3	King Creosote	I Des		Domino	
November 3	Kshmr	Karam			
November 3	Laura Veirs	Phone Orphans		Raven Marching Band	
November 3	Lol Tolhurst, Budgie, and Jacknife Lee	Los Angeles	Electronic, art rock	PIAS	
November 3	Marcia Hines	The Gospel According to Marcia		ABC Music	
November 3	Marnie Stern	The Comeback Kid	Math rock, post-punk	Joyful Noise	
November 3	Marshmello	Sugar Papi		Sony Music Latin, Joytime Collective	
November 3	Matmos	Return to Archive		Smithsonian Folkways	
November 3	Michael Franti and Spearhead	Big Big Love			
November 3	Micky Dolenz	Dolenz Sings R.E.M.		7A Records	
November 3	Peekaboo	Eyes Wide Open			
November 3	Pendulum	Anima		Virgin Music, Mushroom	
November 3	Semisonic	Little Bit of Sun	Pop rock, power pop	Pleasuresonic Recordings	
November 3	Sen Morimoto	Diagnosis		City Slang, Sooper	
November 3	Seth MacFarlane and Liz Gillies	We Wish You the Merriest		Republic	
November 3	Silent Planet	Superbloom	Metalcore	Solid State, UNFD	
November 3	Spiritbox	The Fear of Fear	Metalcore, alternative metal, djent	Rise, Pale Chord Music	
November 3	Spiritual Cramp	Spiritual Cramp	Punk rock	Blue Grape Music	
November 3	The Struts	Pretty Vicious	Glam rock, hard rock	Big Machine	
November 3	Suffocation	Hymns from the Apocrypha	Brutal death metal, technical death metal	Nuclear Blast	
November 3	Tee Grizzley	Tee's Coney Island	Hip-hop	Grizzley Gang, 300	
November 3	Till Lindemann	Zunge	Neue Deutsche Härte	Till Lindemann	
November 3	Tkay Maidza	Sweet Justice		4AD	
November 3	Van Morrison	Accentuate the Positive	Rock and roll	Exile Productions, Virgin	
November 6	Zerobaseone	Melting Point	K-pop, dance, pop	WakeOne	
November 7	Garth Brooks	Time Traveler	Country	Pearl	
November 9	Ran-D	Illuminate	Hardstyle	Roughstate Music	
November 10	Aesop Rock	Integrated Tech Solutions		Rhymesayers	
November 10	AJR	The Maybe Man	Pop	Mercury	
November 10	Alan Walker	Walkerworld	Dance	Kreatell Music	
November 10	Baby Queen	Quarter Life Crisis	Synth-pop	Polydor	
November 10	Bad Boy Chiller Crew	Influential		House Anxiety, Relentless	
November 10	Beirut	Hadsel		Pompeii	
November 10	BJ the Chicago Kid	Gravy	R&B, soul	RTW, RCA	
November 10	Brandy	Christmas with Brandy		Brand Nu, Inc., Motown	
November 10	Broadside	Hotel Bleu		SharpTone	
November 10	Cat Power	Cat Power Sings Dylan: The 1966 Royal Albert Hall Concert		Domino	
November 10	Chase & Status	2 Ruff Vol. 1		Virgin EMI	
November 10	Chris Brown	11:11	R&B, Afrobeats, dancehall	CBE, RCA	
November 10	Chris Stapleton	Higher	Country	Mercury Nashville	
November 10	D Double E	No Reign No Flowers		Bluku Music	
November 10	Daneshevskaya	Long Is the Tunnel	Chamber pop		
November 10	John Francis Flynn	Look Over the Wall, See the Sky	Irish folk	River Lea	
November 10	Foghat	Sonic Mojo	Rock		
November 10	Helmet	Left	Alternative metal	EarMusic	
November 10	James Marriott	Are We There Yet?	Indie rock		
November 10	The Kid Laroi	The First Time	Pop rap	Columbia	
November 10	King Louie Bankston	Harahan Fats		Goner	
November 10	Kodak Black	When I Was Dead	Hip-hop, trap	Sniper Gang, Capitol	
November 10	Lise Davidsen	Christmas from Norway		Decca Classics	
November 10	Lonely the Brave	What We Do to Feel		Easy Life Records	
November 10	Lost Frequencies	All Stand Together		Armada Music	
November 10	MTVoid (Justin Chancellor and Peter Mohamed)	Matter's Knot, Pt. 1			
November 10	PinkPantheress	Heaven Knows	UK garage, bedroom pop	Warner UK	
November 10	Psychedelic Porn Crumpets	Fronzoli		What Reality? Records	
November 10	Pure Bathing Culture	Chalice		Pure Bathing Culture	
November 10	Rick Ross and Meek Mill	Too Good to Be True	Hip-hop	Maybach, Gamma	
November 10	Scream	DC Special		Dischord	
November 10	Stray Kids	Rock-Star		JYP, Republic	
November 10	Wiki and Tony Seltzer	14K Figaro		Wikset Enterprise	
November 10	YoungBoy Never Broke Again	Decided 2		Motown, Never Broke Again	
November 13	Red Velvet	Chill Kill		SM	
November 13	Surf Mesa	Come True		Astralwerks	
November 17	2 Chainz and Lil Wayne	Welcome 2 Collegrove	Hip-hop, Southern hip-hop	Def Jam	
November 17	Abstract Concrete	Abstract Concrete		The State51 Conspiracy	
November 17	Ali Sethi and Nicolas Jaar	Intiha		Other People	
November 17	André 3000	New Blue Sun	Ambient, new-age, spiritual jazz	Epic	
November 17	Blockhead	The Aux		Backwoodz Studioz	
November 17	Bob Dylan	The Complete Budokan 1978		Columbia, Legacy	
November 17	Busty and the Bass	Forever Never Cares		Arts & Crafts	
November 17	Danny Brown	Quaranta		Warp	
November 17	Dolly Parton	Rockstar	Rock, country pop	Butterfly Records, Big Machine	
November 17	E-40	Rule of Thumb: Rule 1			
November 17	EarthGang	EarthGang vs the Algorithm: Robophobia			
November 17	Frost Children	Hearth Room	Indie pop	True Panther	
November 17	Jolie Laide	Jolie Laide		Oscar St. Records	
November 17	Juliana Hatfield	Juliana Hatfield Sings ELO		American Laundromat	
November 17	Julie Byrne	Julie Byrne with Laugh Cry Laugh		Ghostly	
November 17	Kelly Moran	Vesela		Warp	
November 17	Kenny Wayne Shepherd	Dirt on My Diamonds Vol. 1		Provogue, Mascot	
November 17	Kurt Vile	Back to Moon Beach		Verve Forecast	
November 17	Leslie Odom Jr.	When a Crooner Dies		BMG	
November 17	Lil Durk and Only the Family	Nightmares in the Trenches	Drill	Only the Family, Empire	
November 17	Little Man Tate	Welcome to the Rest of Your Life			
November 17	Madness	Theatre of the Absurd Presents C'est la Vie	Two-tone, baroque pop	BMG	
November 17	Mo Troper	Troper Sings Brion		Lame-O	
November 17	Mom Jeans	Bear Market			
November 17	Neil Hamburger	Neil Hamburger Presents Seasonal Depression Suite		Drag City	
November 17	Ozuna	Cosmo		Aura Music, Sony Music Latin	
November 17	Plain White T's	Plain White T's		Fearless	
November 17	The Polyphonic Spree	Salvage Enterprise		Good	
November 17	Racetraitor	Creation and the Timeless Order of Things		Good Fight Music	
November 17	RXK Nephew and Harry Fraud	Life After Neph		Fake Shore Drive, AintNobodyCool, SRFSCHL	
November 17	Showtek	360 Yellow		Skink	
November 17	Steve Aoki	Hiroquest 2: Double Helix		Dim Mak, DJ Kid Millionaire	
November 17	Vince Clarke	Songs of Silence	Ambient, drone	Mute	
November 17	Water from Your Eyes	Crushed by Everyone		Matador	
November 21	Matoma	Love for the Beat		Matoma	
November 24	Adam Hawley	What Christmas Means to Me		A-Train Records	
November 24	Apashe	Antagonist		Kannibalen Records, Majestic Collective	
November 24	Bernie Marsden	Working Man		Conquest Music	
November 24	Busta Rhymes	Blockbusta		Conglomerate, Epic	
November 24	Czarface	Czartificial Intelligence	Hip-hop	Virgin Music	
November 24	Fetty Wap	King Zoo		300	
November 24	Guided by Voices	Nowhere to Go but Up	Indie rock	Guided by Voices, Inc.	
November 24	Joe Jackson	What a Racket!		earMusic	
November 24	My Morning Jacket	Happy Holiday!		ATO	
November 24	Raze Regal and White Denim	Raze Regal & White Denim Inc.	Psychedelic rock, jazz fusion	Bella Union	
November 24	Spector	Here Come the Early Nights		Moth Noise	
November 24	Take That	This Life	Pop rock	EMI	
November 24	Underdark	Managed Decline		Church Road	
November 24	Various artists	Light in the Attic & Friends		Light in the Attic	
November 29	King Gnu	The Greatest Unknown			
November 29	Panopticon	The Rime of Memory		Bindrune Recordings, Season of Mist	
November 30	Flavour	African Royalty			

=== December ===
List of albums released in December 2023
Go to: January | February | March | April | May | June | July | August | September | October | November | December | Back to top
Release date	Artist	Album	Genre	Label	Ref.
December 1	Ateez	The World EP.Fin: Will	K-pop	KQ Entertainment, RCA, Legacy	
December 1	AZ	Truth Be Told			
December 1	Big Scarr	Frozone		1017	
December 1	Clark	Cave Dog		Throttle Records	
December 1	Codeseven	Go Let It In		Equal Vision	
December 1	Dillon Francis	This Mixtape Is Fire Too		Astralwerks	
December 1	Dove Cameron	Alchemical: Volume 1		Disruptor, Columbia	
December 1	Dowsing	No One Said This Would Be Easy		Storm Chasers Ltd, Asian Man	
December 1	Full of Hell and Nothing	When No Birds Sang		Closed Casket Activities	
December 1	Khruangbin	Khruangbin: Live at Sydney Opera House		Dead Oceans	
December 1	Love Minus Zero (Hudson Mohawke and Tiga)	L'Ecstasy			
December 1	Lil Lotus	Nosebleeder		Epitaph	
December 1	Peter Gabriel	I/O	Art rock	Real World	
December 1	Sam Fischer	I Love You, Please Don't Hate Me		Sony Music	
December 1	The Philly Specials (Lane Johnson, Jason Kelce and Jordan Mailata)	A Philly Special Christmas Special	Christmas	Vera Y Records	
December 1	Thy Slaughter (A. G. Cook and Easyfun)	Soft Rock		PC Music	
December 1	Trevor Horn	Echoes: Ancient & Modern		Deutsche Grammophon	
December 1	Wiz Khalifa	Decisions			
December 7	Health	Rat Wars	Electro-industrial, industrial metal, EBM	Loma Vista	
December 8	Alison Goldfrapp	The Love Reinvention			
December 8	Atreyu	The Beautiful Dark of Life	Alternative metal, metalcore	Spinefarm	
December 8	Car Seat Headrest	Faces from the Masquerade	Indie rock	Matador	
December 8	Coone	A New Decade			
December 8	Kenny G	Innocence		Concord	
December 8	Neil Young	Before and After	Folk rock	Reprise	
December 8	Nicki Minaj	Pink Friday 2	Hip-hop, pop rap	Heavy On It, Young Money, Republic	
December 8	Porcupine Tree	Closure/Continuation.Live	Progressive rock	Music for Nations	
December 8	Tate McRae	Think Later	Trap-pop, alternative R&B, dance-pop	RCA	
December 8	Wings of Desire	Life Is Infinite	Indie rock	WMD Recordings	
December 13	Lil Reese	Ask About Me			
December 15	Ambrose Akinmusire	Owl Song	Jazz, minimalist	Nonesuch	
December 15	Children of Bodom	A Chapter Called... Children of Bodom		Spinefarm	
December 15	Graham Hunt	Try Not to Laugh	Power pop	Smoking Room	
December 15	Gucci Mane and B.G.	Choppers & Bricks		1017	
December 15	Therion	Leviathan III	Symphonic metal	Napalm	
December 15	Various artists	The Color Purple (Music from and Inspired By)		WaterTower Music, Warner, Gamma	
December 22	Conway the Machine and Wun Two	Palermo		Vinyl Digital	
December 25	M.I.A.	Bells Collection			
December 26	TVXQ	20&2	Pop, dance, R&B	SM, Kakao	
December 29	Westside Gunn, Conway the Machine, and the Alchemist	Hall & Nash 2: The Original Version		ALC Records	
