= Infinite Spring =

Studio album by Superviolet
- Released: April 21, 2023
- Recorded: Mid 2020 to 2021
- Studio: Columbus, Ohio, United States
- Genre: Indie folk
- Length: 35:36
- Language: English
- Label: Lame-O
- Producer: Zac Little

For me, it was always like, in the winter, you think you would get all of this work done and you think that’s the time when artists are able to be very productive—because there’s not as much social things going on. But, it’s hard, because [the winter] affects you in such a way. Then you have that amazing one day in Ohio, and it’s almost like your New Year’s resolutions really start then. You’re like, ‘I’m gonna do this. I can do all of these things.’ For as long as I can remember, the majority of the songs I’d write would be around the spring, for that reason.

—Steve Ciolek on the title Infinite Spring

Infinite Spring is the debut studio album by American indie folk band Superviolet, released by Lame-O Records on April 21, 2023.

== Reception ==
On June 19, Paste reviewed the best albums of the year so far, ranking this release fifteenth for "a relentless curiosity [that is] so refreshingly brilliant and poetic". This album received a positive review from Pitchfork's Ian Cohen, who rated it a 7.2 out of 10 and wrote that "the songs are all rendered with a patience and perspective that can’t be faked or rushed". Editors of Stereogum chose this as Album of the Week, with critic Chris DeVille writing that the "softer dynamics, a range of lush arrangements, and an influx of acoustic guitars" compared to project founder Steve Ciolek's previous work results in work with "adventurousness" and "excellence [that] continues... unabated, often in service of songs that reckon with falling in love, settling down, and what comes next". In a June round-up of the best albums of 2023, the publication placed this at 21, with DeVille writing that the album "feels lively and lived-in". For the site's end of the year ranking, this placed 41.

== Track listing ==
All tracks written by Steve Ciolek, with additional musical ideas by Toby Reif and Ryan Starinsky (on "Big Songbirds Don’t Cry" and "Long Drive")

1. "Angels on the Ground" – 3:52
2. "Blue Bower" – 3:09
3. "Big Songbirds Don’t Cry" – 3:55
4. "Good Ghost" – 3:45
5. "Dream Dating" – 3:47
6. "Long Drive" – 2:01
7. "Locket" – 2:53
8. "Overrater" – 3:51
9. "Infinite Spring" – 4:49
10. "Wave Back" – 3:33

== Personnel ==
- Steve Ciolek – vocals; guitars; keyboard on "Angels on the Ground", "Big Songbirds Don’t Cry", "Long Drive", "Locket", and "Overrater"; piano on "Angels on the Ground", "Blue Bower", "Good Ghost", "Locket", and "Infinite Spring", engineering, mixing on all tracks except "Wave Back"
- Andy Cook – engineering, mixing on "Wave Back"
- Matt Climer – drums, shaker, tambourine
- Glenn Davis – mastering
- Fry – meows and chewing on "Good Ghost"
- Kosoma Jensen – clarinet on "Dream Dating", harmony vocals on "Long Drive", photography
- Zac Litle – bass guitar, vocals on "Angels on the Ground" and "Overrater", theremin on "Big Songbirds Don’t Cry", wind harp on "Angels on the Gournd", digital goober on "Dream Dating", solo on "Wave Back", engineering, production
- Kelly McNicholas – artwork, layout
- Leticia Wiggins – flute on "Dream Dating"

== See also ==
- List of 2023 albums
