= Life Is Infinite =

2023 album by Wings of Desire

Compilation album by Wings of Desire
- Released: 8 December 2023
- Genre: Indie rock
- Length: 47:01
- Language: English
- Label: WMD
- Producer: James Taylor

“It became quite a healing experience for us both. A kind of rediscovering of who we are as artists and as people as well. We were kind of redefining ourselves, and that took quite a long time. I always feel like we’re always in this cycle of destruction and then creation. I think most artists go through that a lot, and I think that’s part of the creative process. You have to pull everything down so that you can start again and rebuild anew. It was like starting all over again and it was one of the most terrifying things we’ve ever done.”

—James Taylor of Wings of Desire on leaving former band INHEAVEN with Chloe Little and releasing music with this group.

Life Is Infinite is the debut album from British indie rock duo Wings of Desire, released on 8 December 2023 by WMD Recordings. The compilation includes previously released singles by the band as well as the new tracks "001 [Tame the War, Feed the Fire]" and "A Gun in Every Home"; it has received positive reviews from critics.

== Reception ==
In DIY, Joe Goggins gave Life Is Infinite 3.5 out of 5 stars, calling it "a bit of a mixed bag" that "demonstrated plenty of promise". This was Album of the Week at Paste, where critic Matt Mitchell scored it an 8.2 out of 10, characterizing the music as "the sonics never teeter on messy or chaotic, it takes massive chemistry to make rock music this sensational". The publication also chose the single “Chance of a Lifetime“ / “I Will Try My Best“ as some of the best music of October 2023. At Under the Radar, Caleb Campbell rated this compilation an 8 out of 10, encouraging listeners "if you dig into the collection, you’ll find some of this year’s most joyous, inspired, and life-affirming music, the kind that will make you feel like the main character of your own cinematic drama" and this was rated the 84th best album of 2023. Prior to the album release, three of the singles made listings for best songs of the week from the magazine: "Choose a Life" in September 2022, "Runnin'" in February 2023, and "Be Here Now" in August 2023.

== Track listing ==
All songs written by James Taylor except for "Angels" written by Chloe Little and James Taylor

1. "Runnin'" – 4:15
2. "Be Here Now" – 4:00
3. "Choose a Life" – 3:26
4. "A Gun in Every Home" – 3:22
5. "Better Late Than Never" – 3:52
6. "Perfect World" – 4:50
7. "Chance of a Lifetime" – 3:44
8. "I Will Try My Best" – 3:38
9. "A Million Other Suns" – 3:03
10. "001 [Tame the War, Feed the Fire]" – 4:15
11. "Made of Love" – 2:26
12. "Angels" – 3:42
13. "[The Knife]" – 2:20

== Personnel ==
Wings of Desire

- James Taylor – guitars, bass guitar, keyboards, beats, vocals, production
- Chloe Little – keyboards, vocals, visuals

Additional personnel

- Vincent Cachorne – mixing
- John Cenia – mastering
- Conor Mcfury – artwork

== Chart performance ==
Life Is Infinite placed number 20 on the Official Independent Album Breakers Chart in the United Kingdom in its first week after release.

== See also ==
- 2023 in British music
- 2023 in rock music
- List of 2023 albums
