= Black Bay =

Studio album by Silver Moth
- Released: April 21, 2023
- Recorded: April 2021
- Studio: Black Bay Studios, Isle of Lewis, The Outer Herbrides, Scotland, United Kingdom
- Genre: Post-rock
- Length: 44:27
- Language: English
- Label: Bella Union
- Producer: Peter Fletcher; Silver Moth

Black Bay is the debut studio album by British post-rock band Silver Moth, released on Bella Union on April 21, 2023.

== Reception ==
Editors at AllMusic rated this album 3.5 out of 5 stars, with critic Heather Phares writing that "the moment that Black Bay captures is so unique that it might be difficult for Silver Moth to replicate, but it's still a fine document of a replenishing creative retreat in a time of loss and uncertainty".

== Track listing ==
1. "Henry" (Ash Babb, Stuart Braithwaite, Steven Hill, Ben Roberts, Matthew Rochford, and Evi Vine) – 7:19
2. "The Eternal" (Braithwaite, Elisabeth Elektra, and Roberts) – 5:35
3. "Mother Tongue" (Babb, Braithwaite, Elektra, Hill, Roberts, M. Rochford, and Vine) – 6:02
4. "Gaelic Psalm" (Roberts, Gerard Rochford, and M. Rochford) – 3:23
5. "Hello Doom" (Babb, Braithwaite, Elektra, Hill, Roberts, M. Rochford, and Vine) – 15:09
6. "Sedna" (Babb, Braithwaite, Elektra, Hill, Roberts, M. Rochford, and Vine) – 6:59

== Personnel ==
Silver Moth

- Ash Babb – drums, percussion, backing vocals, artwork, design
- Stuart Braithwaite – guitar, synthesizer
- Elisabeth Elektra – synthesizer, vocals
- Evi Vine – bass guitar, spoken word, vocals
- Steven Hill – guitar, synthesizer
- Ben Roberts – bass guitar, cello, guitar, percussion, piano, trumpet
- Matthew Rochford – guitar, harmonium, spoken word, backing vocals

Additional personnel

- Peter Fletcher – engineering, mastering, mixing, production
- Callum Macleod – engineering
- Peter Yates – guitar

== See also ==
- List of 2023 albums
