= Prosaic =

Studio album by Mizmor
- Released: July 21, 2023
- Recorded: 2022
- Studio: Albilith Studio, Portland, Oregon, United States
- Genre: Blackened doom
- Length: 46:15
- Language: English
- Label: Profound Lore Records
- Producer: Liam Neighbors

Mizmor chronology
Myopia (2022)	Prosaic (2023)

Prosaic is a 2023 studio album by American heavy metal act Mizmor.

== Reception ==
Writing for Metal Injection, Max Heilman gave this album an 8 out of 10, calling it a "balance of weighty riffs, stirring soundscapes, and ghoulish vocals" and stating that the "songwriting remains at the core of the proceedings, giving tastefulness to match the rawness". Mandy Scythe of Metal Sucks rated this release a 4 out of 5 for being "both intimate and expansive, dark and light" and continuing that each song is memorable. Editors at Stereogum chose this for Album of the Week, with critic Brad Sanders stating that the music "doesn’t shift between black metal and doom so much as it brings them into union" in a way that is "more instinctive than technical, more about finding emotional commonalities between doom’s depressive depths and black metal’s blazing fire".

== Track listing ==
All songs written by Liam Neighbors

1. "Only an Expanse" – 14:40
2. "No Place to Arrive" – 10:14
3. "Anything But" – 8:22
4. "Acceptance" – 12:59

== Personnel ==
Mizmor

- Liam Neighbors – performance, recording, production

Additional personnel

- Sonny DiPerri – mixing at Octopus Beak
- Adam Gonsalves – mastering at Telegraph Mastering
- Bryan Proteau – artwork

== See also ==
- List of 2023 albums
