= Sun Arcs =

Studio album by Blue Lake
- Released: June 23, 2023
- Recorded: 2022
- Studio: Andersabo, Unnayrd, Sweden; Polychrome, Copenhagen, Denmark; Sauna Studios, Copenhagen, Denmark ("Wavelength")
- Genre: Electronic
- Length: 40:50
- Label: Tonal Union
- Producer: Jason Dungan

Blue Lake chronology
Stikling (2022)	Sun Arcs (2023)

Sun Arcs is a 2023 studio album by electronic musician Jason Dungan, released under the moniker Blue Lake.

== Reception ==
Editors at Pitchfork chose this as Best New Music of the week, with critic Sam Sodomsky scoring it an 8.3 out of 10 for being able to "feel both magical in its simplicity and all the more compelling for what’s just out of frame" and blending diverse genres including Americana and jazz along with ambient and drone sounds. Marc Hogan of that site proposed Grammy Award nominees and included this release to contend for Grammy Award for Best Alternative Jazz Album. Writing for The Quietus, Bernie Brooks characterized this album as "pastoral instrumentals [that] are boundless, shimmering like dappled sun on water" and giving readers a detailed description of the imagery that the music evokes for him.

Editors at Paste chose this for the 49th best album of 2023. Andrew Dansby of The Houston Chronicle included this among the 10 best alternative albums of 2023.

== Track listing ==
All tracks composed by Jason Dungan.

1. "Dallas" – 4:40
2. "Green-Yellow Field" – 2:30
3. "Bloom" – 6:22
4. "Rain Cycle" – 6:42
5. "Writing" – 4:04
6. "Fur" – 3:42
7. "Sun Arcs" – 3:48
8. "Wavelength" – 9:02

== Personnel ==
- Jason Dungan – 48-string zither, acoustic guitar, keyboard, pump organ, cello, clarinet, alto recorder, drums, percussion, Roland 606 drum machine, recording, production, cover illustration
- Adam Heron – design
- Christian Ki Dall – recording on “Wavelength”
- Stephan Mathieu – mastering at Schwebung Mastering in Bonn, Germany
- Jeff Zeigler – mixing at Uniform Recording in Philadelphia, Pennsylvania, United States

== See also ==
- 2023 in American music
- 2023 in jazz
- List of 2023 albums
