= Picturesque (album) =

Studio album by MOLLY
- Released: January 13, 2023
- Studio: Alpine Audio
- Genre: Dream pop; post-rock; shoegaze
- Length: 46:00
- Language: English
- Label: Sonic Cathedral Recordings

MOLLY chronology
All That Will Be (2018)	Picturesque (2023)

Picturesque is the second full-length studio album by Austrian dream pop and post-rock band MOLLY. It has received positive reviews from critics.

== Reception ==
Editors at AllMusic rated this album 4 out of 5 stars, with critic Marcy Donelson writing that this is "lusher and more dramatic than their already textural, cinematic debut" All That Ever Could Have Been. In Mojo, Kieron Tyler gave this release the same score and compares this work to Sigur Rós and Slowdive, but noting that this band have their own identity that is "heady" and "audacious". Jesper L. of Sputnikmusic gave this release a 3.5 out of 5, summing up that "it is a post-gaze record that, subtleties aside, evokes the beauty of the Austrian alps". Editors at Stereogum chose this for Album of the Week, with reviewer Chris DeVille stating that the combination of Romantic poetry with autobiographical lyrics is "a perfectly too-much creative process for a band that often goes gorgeously over the top" and the band "kick up intense emotions, and you infuse those feelings with your own meaning". Daniel Dylan Wray of Uncut scored this release a 7 out of 10, calling it "an album that is as huge and expansive as it is detailed and introspective".

== Track listing ==
All songs written by MOLLY.

1. "Ballerina" – 4:09
2. "Metamorphosis" – 12:36
3. "The Golden Age" – 7:48
4. "Sunday Kid" – 4:10
5. "So to Speak" – 6:07
6. "The Lot" – 11:10

== Personnel ==
MOLLY

- Lars Andersson – guitar, vocals
- Phillip Dornauer – drums

Additional personnel

- Julian Berger – artwork, design

== See also ==
- List of 2023 albums
