= Lost in a Rush of Emptiness =

Studio album by Bleach Lab
- Released: 22 September 2023
- Studio: Eastcote Studios
- Genre: Dream pop; indie rock; shoegaze
- Length: 43:30
- Language: English
- Label: Nettwerk
- Producer: Catherine Marks

Bleach Lab chronology
If You Only Feel It Once (2022)	Lost in a Rush of Emptiness (2023)

Lost in a Rush of Emptiness is a 2023 studio album by British dream pop act Bleach Lab.

== Reception ==
In Dork, Rebecca Kesteven gave this album 5 out of 5 stars, calling it "as beautifully melancholic as its name suggests". At The Line of Best Fit, Lana Williams scored this album a 7 out of 10 for having a "sonic catharsis" with "woozy Mazzy Star melodies and shimmering indie rock goodness" that is ultimately "an impressive collection of ethereal cuts steeped in powerful emotions, that find their root in jangly indie-rock and textured instrumentation". Andy Von Pip of Under the Radar gave this album an 8.5 out of 10, stating that it "demonstrates Bleach Lab's talent for capturing emotions with graceful understatement and poetic beauty" that is "a perfectly judged collection of songs, and despite the melancholy, there's no sense of navel-gazing or self pity".

== Track listing ==
All songs written by Bleach Lab.

1. "All Night" – 3:14
2. "Indigo" – 4:05
3. "Counting Empties" – 3:48
4. "Saving All Your Kindness" – 4:09
5. "Everything at Once" – 4:42
6. "Nothing Left to Lose" – 3:18
7. "Never Coming Back" – 3:55
8. "Smile for Me" – 4:36
9. "Leave the Light On" – 3:35
10. "Life Gets Better" – 6:56
11. "(coda)" – 1:12

== Personnel ==
Bleach Lab

- Jenna Kyle – vocals
- Josh Longman – bass guitar
- Frank Wates – guitar
- Kieran Weston – drums

Additional personnel

- Caesar Edmunds – mixing at Palatine Hill
- Zara Hudson-Kozdoj – cello on "Indigo", "Counting Empties", "Saving All Your Kindness", and "(coda)"
- Anna Kehrer – graphic design
- Catherine Marks – production
- George Murphy – engineering
- Polocho – photography
- Kevin Tuffy – mastering at Manmade Mastering

== See also ==
- 2023 in British music
- List of 2023 albums
