= Long Is the Tunnel =

Studio album by Daneshevskaya
- Released: November 10, 2023
- Genre: Chamber pop
- Length: 21:25
- Language: English
- Label: Winspear
- Producer: Ruben Radlauer; Artur Szerejko; Hayden Ticehurst

Daneshevskaya chronology
Bury Your Horses (2021)	Long Is the Tunnel (2023)

"I really give all of my energy to melody and lyrics. Once I feel good with that, I don't feel like a ton of ownership over it anymore. I can give it to the next person and be like, 'Do whatever you want, have fun.'"

—Anna Daneshevskaya Beckerman on collaborating in the recording process for Long Is the Tunnel

Long Is the Tunnel is the debut full-length studio album by Daneshevskaya, released in 2023. It has received positive reviews from critics.

== Reception ==
Editors at Paste chose this for Album of the Week, with critic Madelyn Dawson rating it an 8.8 out of 10, calling it "an eclectic and spellbinding project" and wrapping up her review that this release "reminds us that this world is a big place governed by some divine presence that we will never begin to understand". It was also shortlisted among the ten best albums of November 2023. That magazine also published a feature interview where journalist Andy Steiner characterized this album as "delicate and tender" and compared it to Sufjan Stevens' Carrie and Lowell.

Prior to the album's release, NPR's All Songs Considered chose "Somewhere in the Middle" to spotlight and "Big Bird" was chosen among the best new indie music of the week by Uproxx's Danielle Chelosky who wrote that "the shoegazey instrumentation is the perfect backdrop for her emotional vocals, alternating between fast and slow, conveying the capricious nature of life".

== Track listing ==
All songs written by Anna Daneshevskaya Beckerman, except where noted.

1. "Challenger Deep" – 3:54
2. "Somewhere in the Middle" – 3:27
3. "Bougainvillea" (Beckerman and Madeline Leshner) – 3:01
4. "Big Bird" – 2:27
5. "Pink Mold" – 3:09
6. "ROY G BIV" – 2:08
7. "Ice Pigeon" – 3:19

== Personnel ==
- Anna Daneshevskaya Beckerman – vocals
- Lewis Evans – saxophone on "Somewhere in the Middle" and "Ice Pigeon"
- Winona Hudec – layout and design
- Madeline Leshner – keyboards on "Bougainvillea", " Big Bird", "Pink Mold", "ROY G BIV", and "Ice Piegon"
- Marcus Maddox – cover photography
- Ruben Radlauer – drums; synthesizer; percussion on "Somewhere in the Middle", "Bougainvillea", "Big Bird", "ROY G BIV", and "Ice Pigeon"; backing vocals on "Big Bird"; programming on "Somewhere in the Middle", "Big Bird", and "Ice Pigeon"; engineering; mixing; production
- Finnegan Shanahan – violin on "Bougainvillea", "Pink Mold", and "ROY G BIV"
- Artur Szerejko – guitar; synthesizer; bass guitar on "Challenger Deep", "Somewhere in the Middle", "Bougainvillea", "Big Bird", "Pink Mold", and "ROY G BIV"; programming on "Challenger Deep", and "Pink Mold"; engineering on "Challenger Deep", "Bougainvillea", "Big Bird", "Pink Mold", and "ROY G BIV"; mixing; production
- Hayden Ticehurst – synthesizer; guitar on "Somewhere in the Middle", "Bougainvillea", "Big Bird", "ROY G BIV", and "Ice Pigeon"; backing vocals on "Big Bird"; bass guitar on "Ice Pigeon"; lap steel guitar on "Ice Pigeon"; programming on "Somewhere in the Middle", "Big Bird", and "Ice Pigeon", engineering; mixing; production

== See also ==
- 2023 in American music
- List of 2023 albums
