= Black Radical Love =

Studio album by Move
- Released: August 11, 2023
- Genre: Hardcore punk
- Length: 26:25
- Language: English
- Label: Triple-B Records
- Producer: Charlie Abend

Move chronology
| Freedom Dreams (2021) | Black Radical Love (2023) |

The record deals with our current position living underneath the US Imperialist state specifically a Black experience. The need for revolutionary change and the fact people are actively building a better future right now. It’s a tale of two records, Side A expresses our current frustrations and anger. Side B focuses on where we are going and the joy the journey brings us as we move towards a tomorrow where all people have their needs met to live their best lives.

—A statement from Move on the purpose of Black Radical Love.

Black Radical Love is the 2023 full-length studio album debut by American hardcore punk band Move. It has received positive reviews from critics.

== Reception ==
At BrooklynVegan, Black Radical Love was shortlisted as one of the best albums of the week and critic Andrew Sacher called it "an overt piece of protest art" that is "also a fiery hardcore album that makes it impossible to stand still" that mixes anger and joy. Sacher also chose this as one of the top ten hardcore albums of mid-2023. In The Fader, Jordan Darville wrote that "not since the early days of Code Orange has a genre-skipping band sounded this fierce, with its flesh-rending combination of metal, hardcore, and noise-rock". A brief review of the best albums of the week from Em Shadows of Metal Sucks praised the release for mixing serious political themes with "catchy songwriting [that] is also just fun". Editors at Stereogum chose this for Album of the Week, with critic Tom Breihan comparing this work favorably to Zulu's A New Tomorrow for its punk activism and writes that it "hits with a physical ecstasy that never dims the anger" and continues that the album works both as a political statement and a musical one.

== Track listing ==
All tracks are written by Move (Devon Austrie, Corey Charpentier, Andrew Crumby, Nick Hochmuth, and Jake McLean).

1. "Double Death" – 1:45
2. "Imperialist Reign" – 2:19
3. "Statement: Lee Lee" – 0:32
4. "Trojan Horse" – 2:39
5. "Summer Trend" – 2:31
6. "Ode to the Pit" – 1:57
7. "Statement: Deja" – 0:32
8. "For All Not One" – 2:15
9. "Comrade" – 2:55
10. "1,000,000 Experiments" – 2:07
11. "Ascent" – 2:04
12. "Black Radical Love" – 4:43

== Personnel ==
Move

- Devon "Dev" Austrie – drums
- Corey Charpentier – vocals
- Andrew Crumby – guitar
- Nick "Nicko" Hochmuth – guitar
- Jake MacLean – bass guitar

Additional personnel

- Charlie Abend – production
- Christine Cadette – vocals on "For All Not One"
- River Elliott – vocals on "Summer Trend"
- Aaron Heard – vocals on "Double Death"
- Kayla Philips – vocals on "Summer Trend"
- Gjared Robinson – vocals on "Ode to the Pit"

== See also ==
- List of 2023 albums
