= He Left Nothing for the Swim Back =

Studio album by Skech185 and Jeff Markey
- Released: February 3, 2023
- Genre: Hip-hop
- Length: 34:07
- Label: Backwoodz Studioz
- Producer: Jeff Markey

Skech185 chronology
New Age Middle Finger (2011)	He Left Nothing for the Swim Back (2023)

Jeff Markey chronology
Sports & Leisure (2022)	He Left Nothing for the Swim Back (2023)

He Left Nothing for the Swim Back is a collaborative studio album by American rapper Skech185 and American record producer Jeff Markey. It was released on February 3, 2023, through Backwoodz Studioz.

== Background ==
Willie Lee McIntyre Jr., better known under the pseudonym Skech185, is an American rapper originally from Chicago. He grew up on the southeast side of Chicago before moving to New York. He is a member of the Chicago rap group Tomorrow Kings. He is also one half of the duo War Church, along with Texas producer Analog(ue) Tape Dispenser.

He Left Nothing for the Swim Back is Skech185's first collaborative album with Brooklyn producer Jeff Markey. The album includes guest appearances from three of Tomorrow Kings members: I.B. Fokuz, Collasoul Structure, and Lamon Manuel.

== Release ==
The album was released on February 3, 2023, through Backwoodz Studioz. Music videos were released for "He Left Nothing for the Swim Back", "Western Automatic Music Part 1", and "Badly Drawn Hero".

== Critical reception ==
Professional ratings
Review scores
Source	Rating
HipHopDX	4.3/5
Pitchfork	7.4/10
Sputnikmusic	4.6/5

J. Edward Keyes of Bandcamp Daily wrote, "Sobering without ever being depressing or emotionally manipulative, Swim Back is a showcase for masterfully precise writing and moody beats to match." Steve Erickson of The Arts Fuse commented that Skech185's "intense flow leaves little space, allowing him to run through pages' worth of lyrics in minutes." He added that Jeff Markey's beats "embrace disorientation rather than easy pleasure." Tom Morgan of PopMatters called the album "an essential listen for open-minded rap fans."

=== Accolades ===
Accolades for He Left Nothing for the Swim Back
Publication	List	Rank	Ref.
Bandcamp Daily	The Best Hip-Hop Albums of 2023	—	
Flood Magazine	20 Albums from 2023 You Should Know	—	
PopMatters	The 21 Best Hip-Hop Albums of 2023	14	

== Track listing ==
All tracks are written by Skech185, except where noted.

He Left Nothing for the Swim Back track listing
No.	Title	Length
1.	"He Left Nothing for the Swim Back"	3:10
2.	"Badly Drawn Hero"	3:56
3.	"East Side Summer" (featuring I.B. Fokuz, Collasoul Structure, and Solar Five)	5:01
4.	"Jay Street" (featuring Samurai Banana, Still Rift, and Lamon Manuel)	4:22
5.	"The River"	2:16
6.	"Nights and Weekends" (featuring PremRock and Lt Headtrip)	4:37
7.	"Up to Speed"	3:33
8.	"Western Automatic Music Part 1"	2:35
9.	"Western Automatic Music Part 2" (featuring Billy Woods and Collasoul Structure)	4:34
Total length:		34:07

== Personnel ==
Credits adapted from liner notes.

- Jeff Markey – production
- Steel Tipped Dove – mixing
- Willie Green – mastering
- Vito Oliva – photography
- Ashes57 – design
