= Strega Beata =

Studio album by Lana Del Rabies
- Released: March 17, 2023
- Genre: Electronic
- Length: 58:41
- Label: Gilgongo
- Producer: Sam An

Lana Del Rabies chronology
Shadow World (2018)	Strega Beata (2023)	Omnipotent Fuck (2025)

Strega Beata is the third studio album by American musician Sam An under the pseudonym Lana Del Rabies. It was released on March 17, 2023, through Gilgongo Records.

== Background ==
Sam An, also known under the pseudonym Lana Del Rabies, is an American musician, producer, and multimedia artist based in Phoenix, Arizona. She released In the End I Am a Beast (2016) and Shadow World (2018) through Deathbomb Arc.

Strega Beata is Sam An's third album as Lana Del Rabies. It contains 10 tracks. Mark Glick of the band AJJ plays cello on the album. The album's title loosely translates to "blessed witch". In a 2023 interview, she stated that the album's theme is "death and rebirth".

== Release ==
Music videos were released for the tracks "Prayers of Consequence" and "Hallowed Is the Earth". Strega Beata was released on March 17, 2023, through Gilgongo Records. Lana Del Rabies later released Becoming Everything: Strega Beata Remixed (2024), which contains remixes of Strega Beata's tracks by other artists.

== Critical reception ==
Professional ratings
Review scores
Source	Rating
The Arts Desk	4/5 stars
The Line of Best Fit	7/10
MusicOMH	4/5 stars

Alex Deller of Metal Hammer wrote, "Genres are smashed, spliced and mixed like the toxic ingredients for flying ointment ground down in a witch's mortar and pestle, with gothic moodiness leeching into industrial churn, tape-decayed prettiness and coruscating noise-outs." Guy Oddy of The Arts Desk stated, "As it makes no concessions to mainstream pop, Strega Beata is unlikely to break any commercial sales records in the near future, but it is an album that rewards with repeated listening." Greg Hyde of The Line of Best Fit commented that "The album makes for subtly intense, but definitely not easy, listening."

On July 3, 2023, The Quietus placed the album at number 66 on its list of "The Quietus Albums of the Year So Far Chart 2023". On January 2, 2024, Flood Magazine included the album in its list of the "20 Albums from 2023 You Should Know".

== Track listing ==
All tracks are written by Sam An.

Strega Beata track listing
No.	Title	Length
1.	"Prayers of Consequence"	4:02
2.	"A Plague"	4:09
3.	"Master"	7:32
4.	"Mother"	8:52
5.	"Grace the Teacher"	4:42
6.	"Mourning"	9:18
7.	"Hallowed Is the Earth"	4:36
8.	"Reckoning"	3:58
9.	"Apocalypse Fatigue"	5:41
10.	"Forgive"	5:49
Total length:		58:41

== Personnel ==
Credits adapted from liner notes.

- Sam An – production, performance, mixing
- Mark Glick – cello (1, 5, 10)
- John Dieterich – mastering
