= No Love No Hate =

Studio album by Just Honest
- Released: September 15, 2023
- Genre: Alternative pop
- Length: 24:11
- Label: Self-released
- Producers: Just Honest; Peter Cleaver; Guhregory; DyHard

No Love No Hate is a debut studio album by Just Honest. An alternative pop album, it deals with coming of age and was released independently on September 15, 2023.

== Background and reception ==
=== Background ===
Russia-born Germany-based artist Just Honest started the work on the album in 2021, as the first single "Toxic Culture" was released. In 2023, the work on the album led to artist's nomination for Female* Producer Prize of the year by Sony Music and Female Music Collective Germany. Album development was affected by the Russian invasion of Ukraine and national covid curfews.

=== Content and reception ===
Overall, the album delves into the topics of a first major dating experience and learning self-love through the perspective of parental abandonment.

Album name stems from the song "Toxic Culture," – a dream pop ballad that describes healing from the heartbreak after a cycling accident. The song reached a million streams by 2023. Album opener, the song "Curfew with You," captures initial infatuation and it is a bedroom and orchestral pop song with theatrical mix, elements of twee, and bright pizzicato string arrangements. In an interview for the German newspaper MusikWoche, another song from the album, "Big Deal (Ur not A)," was described as a dance track about how a heartbreak becomes nothing compared to other issues in the world like wars and climate change.

The album's closing track, avant-garde "I Had No Parents," was lauded by Modern Soulful Music Awards's Dorthea Enrique for its unconventionality and enigmatic lyrics that "set[] a new precedent in the industry." The song serves as a final moment of reflection and letting go.. The song peaked at number 25 on 87.8 UCFM's weekly chart for the week of February 19, 2024.

== Track listing ==
Credits adapted from Tidal and from the album's liner notes. All tracks were written and produced by Just Honest, in addition to what's noted.

No Love No Hate track listing
No.	Title	Producer(s)	Length
1.	"Curfew with You"	Guhregory^{[a]}	3:01
2.	"Fuck You Song"	DyHard; Peter Cleaver	2:41
3.	"Bad in Bed"	Cleaver	3:03
4.	"Heavy"	Guhregory	2:59
5.	"Big Deal (Ur not A)"	Guhregory; Jesus Gomez	3:54
6.	"Toxic Culture"	Cleaver^{[a]}	2:38
7.	"Bye with a Happy Face"	Cleaver	2:47
8.	"I Had No Parents"	Cleaver	3:08
Total length:			24:11

Notes

- ^{^[a]} signifies an additional producer
- All track titles are stylized in all lowercase.

== Release history ==
Release dates and formats for No Love No Hate
Region	Date	Format(s)	Label	Ref.
Various	September 15, 2023	digital download; streaming	Self-released	
