= No More Blue Skies =

Studio album by Gold Dime
- Released: October 20, 2023
- Length: 37:43
- Label: No Gold
- Producer: Andrya Ambro

Gold Dime chronology
My House (2019)	No More Blue Skies (2023)

Singles from No More Blue Skies
- 1. "Wasted Wanted" Released: July 25, 2023; 2. "Denise" Released: August 22, 2023; 3. "We Lose Again" Released: September 19, 2023

No More Blue Skies is the third studio album by American art rock band Gold Dime, led by Andrya Ambro of Talk Normal. It was released on October 20, 2023, through No Gold. The album received acclaim from critics.

== Background ==
Ambro announced the album on July 25, 2023, and released the lead single "Wasted Wanted" the same day. No More Blue Skies was produced by the musician herself and features mastering by Talk Normal bandmate Sarah Register. The record sees Ambro "wailing over noisy, widescreen rock backing", taking inspiration from various artists, including Eurythmics, Nina Simone, and the poetry of Kate Mohanty.

== Critical reception ==
Professional ratings
Aggregate scores
Source	Rating
Metacritic	91/100
Review scores
Source	Rating
PopMatters	8/10
Uncut	4.5/5 stars
The Wire	90/100

At Metacritic, which assigns a normalized rating out of 100 to reviews from professional critics, the album received an average score of 91 based on four reviews, indicating "universal acclaim". The editors of The Wire counted the album as one of the "most vibrant, purposeful rock records of the year" and highlighted Ambro's ability to balance "the sickly weariness of this day and age with a triumphant jubilation of simply being alive". The staff at Uncut thought No More Blue Skies might represent Ambro's vision at its "most accurate", displaying a "singular blend of abrasively charming feel-bad noir rock".

PopMatters's Chris Ingalls opined that the album can be "loud, fast, and urgent" but is also able to "disarm" the listener in order to create a "deeply unsettling atmosphere" that is "well worth the wait". Writing for The Quietus, Alex Deller felt that Gold Dime stayed true to their "distinct, established sound" while simultaneously pushing forward their "sonic palette".

== Track listing ==
All tracks are written by Andrya Ambro.

No More Blue Skies track listing
No.	Title	Length
1.	"Denise"	5:01
2.	"Wasted Wanted"	4:49
3.	"Please Not Today"	5:21
4.	"Beneath Below"	5:58
5.	"We Lose Again"	6:08
6.	"Interpretations"	6:15
7.	"Ronnie Desperation"	4:11
Total length:		37:43
