= Valeria (album) =

Studio album by Arppa
- Released: 10 March 2023
- Genre: indie, pop, rock, jazz, progressive rock, folk
- Length: 31:38
- Language: Finnish
- Label: Johanna Kustannus
- Producer: Väinö Karjalainen

Arppa chronology
Kinovalon alla (2021)	Valeria (2023)

Singles from Valeria
- 1. "Paha meno Pengerkadulla" Released: 13 May 2022; 2. "Kartta väärinpäin" Released: 8 July 2022; 3. "Kaverin synttäreillä" Released: 28 October 2022

Valeria is the third studio album by the Finnish singer-songwriter Arppa, published 10 March 2023. It was described as "jazzy", "drowsy" and "intimate".

== Reception ==
Published in CD, LP and digital formats, the album debuted at number one on The Official Finnish Charts for all albums and for physical album sales. It met critical acclaim in Finland.

- Helsingin Sanomat:
- Kulttuuritoimitus:
- Soundi:

== Personnel ==
- vocals: Aaro Airola
- guitar: Ville-Veikko Airaniemi
- bass: Antti Ahoniemi
- drums: Okko Saastamoinen

== Track listing ==
No.	Title	Lyrics and music	Length
1.	"Hiekkasäkki aivojen tilalla"	Aaro Airola	4:44
2.	"Vihdoin viimein"	Aaro Airola	2:53
3.	"Luulin että"	Aaro Airola	3:29
4.	"Kaverin synttäreillä"	Aaro Airola	2:53
5.	"Metsänpoika popparissa"	Aaro Airola	4:21
6.	"Paha meno Pengerkadulla"	Aaro Airola	3:29
7.	"Maailman hitain biisi"	Aaro Airola	3:11
8.	"Kartta väärinpäin"	Aaro Airola	3:19
9.	"Valeria"	Aaro Airola	3:16
