= Infinite Worlds =

Infinite Worlds may refer to:

- Infinite Worlds (book), 2005 nonfiction book
- GURPS Infinite Worlds, 2005 role playing game
- Infinite Worlds, 2007 album by Vagabon
- The Infinite Worlds of H. G. Wells, 2001 television miniseries
- Infinite Worlds (album)
