= Infinite Worlds (album) =

Studio album by Vagabon
- Released: February 24, 2017
- Recorded: Spring 2016
- Studios: Salvation Recording Co. (New Paltz, New York)
- Genre: Indie rock
- Length: 28:20
- Languages: English; French
- Label: Father/Daughter
- Producer: Laetitia Tamko

Vagabon chronology
Persian Garden EP (2014)	Infinite Worlds (2017)	Vagabon (2019)

Infinite Worlds is the debut studio album by Cameroon-born musician Laetitia Tamko, under the stage name Vagabon. Released in February 2017, it would be her last record under the Father/Daughter Records banner, as her self-titled follow-up would be released through Nonesuch Records in 2019.

Recorded alongside co-producer, engineer and mixer Chris Daly, the record would expand beyond the lo-fi of Tamko's 2014 EP Persian Garden.

Upon its release, the record was greeted with general positivity from music reviewers, with applause going to the songwriting, Tamko's vocals and the record's overall eclectism. It appeared on several year-end lists for 2017.

== Background ==
2014 saw self-taught multi-instrumentalist and songwriter Laetitia Tamko release a six-song EP titled Persian Garden via Miscreant Records. Recorded in both a basement in Brooklyn and in Dobbs Ferry, New York, instrumentation help came from multiple collaborators.

2017 would see Tamko with a new recording location and a new producing partner in Christopher Daly. Infinite Worlds would this time be released with the help of Father/Daughter Records, an independent label that boasted bands like Mutual Benefit and Diet Cig.

Several songs appearing on Garden were dusted off and re-recorded for Worlds; "The Embers" was originally named "Sharks" but shifted from "whispered confession to empowering paean" for the full-length. "Fear & Force" and "Cold Apartment" were also given a new sheen.

Collaborators included Garden's bass guitarist Eva Lawitts, who came back to record on the album. The mastering was handled by Jamal Ruhe, who had lent his technical talents to recordings including experimental rock collective Swans' The Seer (2012).

== Composition ==
=== Musical style ===
Musically, the aesthetic of Infinite Worlds has been noted as nestling itself into the universe of indie rock. Pitchfork reviewer Kevin Lozano called the record a "victorious...inimitable take" on the genre.

However, it has also been noted as "varied", "genre-spanning" and "incredibly diverse", with sundry genres woven throughout. Its sounds go "from folk to rock to pop, sometimes during the course of a single track." It has been seen as a "mix of spikey noise pop assaults, stripped ballads and more haunting, anxious tendencies".

Kicking off the record is "The Embers". Its sound has been likened its sound to that of indie rock trio Built to Spill and art punk / indie rock octet Modest Mouse, with its "anthemic steady guitars and booming drums" cited as hallmarks.

"Fear & Force", the second song, contains backing vocals from fellow musician Greta Kline, known for her bedroom pop / indie pop project Frankie Cosmos. A "wistful" acoustic song, it features "lush" synths, "grungy" reverb and "steady" kick drums. It is followed by the "surging" punk-pop of "Minneapolis".

"Mal a L'aise", the fourth track, is sung completely in vocalist Laetitia Tamko's native French, one of the languages spoken in her birth country of Cameroon. "One of the most interesting tracks" on Infinite Worlds, it digs into "guazy" ambient pop, like that of the Cocteau Twins, as well as sound collage "made of a spectral chorus of voices, processed and multiplied." It is also "almost close to new age," being compared it to the music of Grouper and Harold Budd. While some have seen it as chillwave and dream pop, it has also been credited with "innocuously weaving late 1990s post-rock with left field electronica", yielding a "near instrumental".

The "strangled" post-punk of "100 Years" is followed by "waltzing" indie pop on "Cleaning House". The record ends with the "haunted" indie folk of "Alive and a Well".

=== Lyrical content ===
Infinite Worlds dwells on concepts of community, love, personhood, and finding and sharing safe spaces with others.

Noting that Worlds conceptually thought upon "sharing space with others who don't necessarily see eye to eye", Pitchfork's Kevin Lozano summed up a point that the record kept coming back to: "the community you want to live in is one you have to make."

"100 Years" employs magical realism to "paint recollections of a childhood home". It dons a "spirited rebellion", with Tamko singing lines like "if we sell this house / I won't go / no, I won't go!"

Ideas of displacement also appear, reflected on in songs like closer "Alive and a Well" on which Tamko sings "take what you need and go / don't look back and see / if the well is producing."

The record has also drawn comparisons to A Seat at the Table, the lauded third studio album by singer-songwriter and record producer Solange, though that record was rooted in significantly more neo soul and R&B territory musically.

== Title and packaging ==
During her recording process, Tamko read a collection of poetry by Dana Ward called The Crisis of Infinite Worlds, where the recording gets its name. Upon noting the book as challenging to read, Tamko said:

"I had to think critically while reading Dana Ward, it was exciting to be challenged in that way. While I was writing the album, it was a lot of me thinking critically about how to actualize my ideas, and the challenge of reaching proficiency in new instruments. It sort of mirrored my experience reading Dana Ward’s book. I found myself combing his writing over and over and over until I grabbed something from it."

The cover artwork is supplied by Kaela Chambers, who also did the artwork for Garden.

== Critical reception ==
Professional ratings
Aggregate scores
Source	Rating
AnyDecentMusic?	7.8/10
Metacritic	84/100
Review scores
Source	Rating
AllMusic	3.5/5 stars
The Austin Chronicle	3/5 stars
The A.V. Club	A
DIY	4/5 stars
Exclaim!	9/10
Pitchfork	8.5/10
Tiny Mix Tapes	3.5/5 marks

Infinite Worlds was released to positive reviews from multiple music critics. On Metacritic, the record holds a score of 84 out of 100, which indicates "universal acclaim", based on 9 reviews.

Kevin Lozano for Pitchfork gave the record a glowing assessment, applauding it as "never downtrodden" and "a stunning document of what indie rock can look like from a viewpoint that isn't necessarily widespread in the genre." It was awarded the website's "Best New Music" accolade. El Hunt of DIY called the record "a witty, succinct debut album."

=== Accolades ===
==== Semester-end lists ====
Publication	List	Rank	Ref.
Bandcamp Daily	The Best Albums of Winter 2017	--	
Stereogum	The 50 Best Albums Of 2017 So Far	29	
"--" indicates an unordered list.

==== Year-end lists ====
Publication	List	Rank	Ref.
Bandcamp Daily	The Best Albums of 2017	64	
Metacritic	Best Albums of 2017	62	
New York Daily News	The 25 Best Albums of 2017	12	
No Ripcord	The Best Albums of 2017	33	
Pitchfork	The 20 Best Rock Albums of 2017	10	
Pitchfork	The 50 Best Albums of 2017	42	
Uproxx	50 Best Albums of 2017	47	

==== Tracks ====
Publication	Work	List	Rank	Ref.
NPR Music	"Fear & Force"	The 100 Best Songs of 2017	58	
Pitchfork	"The Embers"	The 100 Best Songs of 2017	94	

== Impact and legacy ==
Infinite Worlds and its maker were touched on in Pitchfork's Features Editor Jillian Mapes' essay The Year "Indie Rock" Meant Something Different, released in December 2017. Mapes reflected on how the year saw queer, multi-racial and female musicians at the forefront of indie rock music. She noted Perfume Genius, Jay Som, and Moses Sumney, among others such as Vagabon herself, as "all key players in [the genre's] latest revolution."

About the record, she wrote how "Tamko's shouts about making your own space in the world quietly shook me in a new way." She also noted how the songs "felt necessary" in 2017.

== Track listing ==
All songs written by Laetitia Tamko.

Infinite Worlds track listing
No.	Title	Length
1.	"The Embers"	3:15
2.	"Fear & Force"	3:33
3.	"Minneapolis"	3:17
4.	"Mal à L'aise"	5:23
5.	"100 Years"	2:08
6.	"Cleaning House"	3:17
7.	"Cold Apartment"	3:25
8.	"Alive and a Well"	4:02
Total length:		28:20

=== Sample credits ===
- "Mal á L'aise" samples and remixes elements of an untitled song by Steve Sobs and includes a sample of Eric Littman's voice.

== Personnel ==
=== Musicians ===
Credits adapted from the record's Bandcamp page.

Vagabon

- Lætitia Tamko – lead vocals, bass, drums, guitars, synths

Additional musicians

- Casey Weissbuch – drums
- Dominick Anfiteatro – bass
- Elaiza Santos – additional vocals
- Elise Okusami – drums
- Eric Littman – additional vocals (on "Mal à L'aise")
- Eva Lawitts – bass
- Greta Kline – additional vocals (on "Fear & Force")

=== Technical ===
- Laetitia Tamko – producer
- Christopher Daly – engineer, mixer, producer
- Jamal Ruhe – mastering

=== Artwork and design ===
- Kaela Chambers – cover artwork
