= Esther Rose =

Esther Rose may refer to:

- Esther Rose (painter)
- Esther Rose (musician)
