= Ugly Cherries =

Studio album by Pwr Bttm
- Released: September 18, 2015
- Genre: Queercore; indie rock; garage rock
- Length: 27:46
- Label: Miscreant Records; Father/Daughter Records
- Producer: Christopher Daly

Pwr Bttm chronology
Republican National Convention (2015)	Ugly Cherries (2015)	Pageant (2017)

Ugly Cherries is the first full-length album by the New York City queer punk duo Pwr Bttm. According to the album's record label, Father/Daughter Records, the album is about "...the duo's experiences with queerness, gender, and adulthood over the course of a year of living in upstate New York". The album's title comes from Ben Hopkins' distaste for maraschino cherries and its personification for Hopkins' queerness, claiming "it sort of fell in line with my self loathing on the subject".

== Background ==
Pwr Bttm signed with Father/Daughter Records after the co-founder Jessi Frick retweeted the music video for Pwr Bttm's song "Carbs". Ben Hopkins then messaged Frick over Twitter, which eventually led to a record deal.

== Recording and production ==
Ugly Cherries was recorded in Hudson, New York.

== Reception ==
Professional ratings
Aggregate scores
Source	Rating
Metacritic	79/100
Review scores
Source	Rating
Pitchfork	7.5/10
Rolling Stone	3.5/5 stars

Ugly Cherries received positive reviews from music critics. At Metacritic, which assigns a weighted mean rating out of 100 to reviews from mainstream critics, the album received an average score of 79, based on 4 reviews.

== Track listing ==
All tracks are written by Liv Bruce and Ben Hopkins.

No.	Title	Length
1.	"Short Lived Nightmare"	1:06
2.	"Dairy Queen"	2:31
3.	"I Wanna Boi"	2:03
4.	"Ugly Cherries"	2:20
5.	"Serving Goffman"	2:03
6.	"Nu 1"	2:45
7.	"West Texas"	2:27
8.	"1994"	2:55
9.	"C U Around"	2:26
10.	"All the Boys"	2:26
11.	"House in Virginia"	4:51

== Personnel ==
Adapted from Bandcamp.

- Liv Bruce – drums, vocals, guitar
- Ben Hopkins – guitar, vocals, drums
- Christopher Daly – engineer, producer
- Jamal Ruhe – mastering
