= Want (Esther Rose album) =

Studio album by Esther Rose
- Released: May 2, 2025
- Studio: The Bomb Shelter (Nashville)
- Genre: Alternative country rock; pop
- Length: 43:36
- Label: New West
- Producer: Ross Farbe

Esther Rose chronology
Safe To Run (2023)	Want (2025)

Want is the fifth studio album by American country musician Esther Rose. It was released on May 2, 2025, by New West Records.

Also known as The Therapy LP, Want consists of eleven songs featuring a total runtime of over forty-three minutes and it was produced by Rose. It was preceded by Rose's 2023 record, Safe To Run. Incorporating alternative country rock, the album centers on the themes of regret, affection, and heartbreak.

== Reception ==
Professional ratings
Review scores
Source	Rating
AllMusic	4/5 stars
Mojo	4/5 stars
Uncut	7/10 stars

Andrew Perry of Mojo assigned the album a rating of four stars, commenting "Caution, be damned – Want merits unreserved attention." Fiona Shepherd of Uncut rated Want seven out of ten and remarked, "Santa Fe-based songwriter lets it all hang out in raw but witty style." AllMusic described the album's songs as "strong" and praised Rose's "warm, empowered storytelling, playfully poetic way with words, and engaging sense of melody."

== Track listing ==
Want track listing
No.	Title	Length
1.	"Want"	4:58
2.	"Tailspin" (featuring Video Age)	3:38
3.	"Had to"	4:12
4.	"Ketamine"	3:40
5.	"Rescue You"	4:23
6.	"Scars" (featuring Dean Johnson)	3:16
7.	"Messenger"	2:09
8.	"New Bad"	3:44
9.	"The Clown"	3:55
10.	"Color Wheel"	4:03
11.	"Want Pt. 2"	5:38
Total length:		43:36

== Personnel ==
Credits adapted from the album's liner notes.

- Gina Leslie – bass, vocals
- John James Tourville – pedal steel, concert drum
- Kunal Prakash – guitar, piano, bass six, rainstick
- Howe Pearson – drums, percussion, piano, vocals
- Ross Farbe – guitar, synthesizer, organ, piano, percussion, vocals, production, mixing
- Dean Johnson – vocals
- Esther Rose – vocals, guitar
- Drew Carroll – engineering
- Joe Lambert – mastering
- Jeff Powell – vinyl mastering
- Anna Marie Tendler – cover and back cover photos
- Megan Karson – interior photos
- Jackson Tupper – graphic design
