= Crush on Me =

Studio album by Sir Babygirl
- Released: February 15, 2019
- Length: 26:22
- Label: Father/Daughter
- Producer: Kelsie Hogue

Professional ratings
Aggregate scores
Source	Rating
Metacritic	77/100
Review scores
Source	Rating
The Line of Best Fit	9/10
Pitchfork	6.8/10

Crush on Me is the debut studio album by American musician Sir Babygirl. It was released on February 15, 2019 through Father/Daughter Records.

== Track listing ==
Crush On Me
No.	Title	Length
1.	"Heels"	3:15
2.	"Flirting With Her"	3:50
3.	"Cheerleader"	4:09
4.	"Flirting With Her (Reprise)"	1:26
5.	"Haunted House"	4:01
6.	"Everyone Is a Bad Friend"	2:59
7.	"Haunted House (Reprise)"	1:00
8.	"Pink Lite"	3:56
9.	"Crush on Me"	1:46
Total length:		24.62

Crush On Me: BICONIC Edition
No.	Title	Length
1.	"Heels - 2019 Remaster"	3:15
2.	"Flirting With Her - 2019 Remaster"	3:50
3.	"Cheerleader - 2019 Remaster"	4:09
4.	"Flirting With Her (Reprise) - 2019 Remaster"	1:26
5.	"Haunted House - 2019 Remaster"	4:01
6.	"Everyone Is a Bad Friend 2019 Remaster"	2:59
7.	"Haunted House (Reprise) - 2019 Remaster"	1:00
8.	"Pink Lite - 2019 Remaster"	3:56
9.	"Crush on Me - 2019 Remaster"	1:46
10.	"Pink Lite (Acoustic)"	4:08
11.	"Praying - 2019 Remaster"	3:54
12.	"Heels (Kid Quiet Remix)"	3:25
Total length:		35.49
