= Love's Crushing Diamond =

Studio album by Mutual Benefit
- Released: October 7, 2013
- Genres: Indie folk; baroque pop
- Length: 31:49
- Label: Soft Eyes (re-released by Other Music Recording Company)

Mutual Benefit chronology
Love's Crushing Diamond (2013)	Skip a Sinking Stone (2016)

Love's Crushing Diamond is the debut studio album by American band Mutual Benefit. It was originally released as a limited edition 250 LP run by Soft Eyes on October 7, 2013. Other Music Recording Company re-released the album on a larger scale on December 3, 2013. The album was recorded on the road and at Ohm Recording Studio in Austin, TX, Temporary Autonomous Zone in St Louis, MO, and Thee Hallowed Sound Dungeon in Boston, MA.

== Critical reception ==
Professional ratings
Aggregate scores
Source	Rating
Metacritic	84/100
Review scores
Source	Rating
AllMusic	4/5 stars
Consequence of Sound	4.5/5 stars
Drowned in Sound	8/10
Exclaim!	9/10
Mojo	4/5 stars
NME	9/10
Paste	8.9/10
Pitchfork	8.4/10
Rolling Stone	3.5/5 stars
Uncut	8/10

Love's Crushing Diamond received widespread acclaim from contemporary music critics. At Metacritic, which assigns a normalized rating out of 100 to reviews from mainstream critics, the album received an average score of 84, based on 18 reviews, which indicates "universal acclaim".

Ian Cohen of Pitchfork praised the album, stating, "Love’s Crushing Diamond is not folk in the escapist sense either, though it was recorded during a “year of notable absences” in San Diego, Austin and Boston. Many of these songs take place in mundane, unglamorous locales—city trains, mining towns, cornfields, motel rooms. And in Lee's point of view, you need to discover a little space within those places that you can call your own and then invite some people to share it with. Yeah, it does skew kinda hippie, as Lee’s lyrics detail picking roses by the lake and how a river can’t help but keep on keepin’ on. That’s perfectly fine within the scheme of Love’s Crushing Diamond, which always sounds populated in a way that stresses its central themes of getting your own shit together so you’re better prepared to care for someone else."

== Track listing ==
All tracks are written by Jordan Lee.

No.	Title	Length
1.	"Strong River"	3:00
2.	"Golden Wake"	3:16
3.	"Advanced Falconry"	5:05
4.	"That Light That's Blinding"	4:03
5.	""Let's Play"/Statue of a Man"	3:36
6.	"C. L. Rosarian"	5:40
7.	"Strong Swimmer"	7:09
Total length:		31:49

== Personnel ==
Main personnel

- Jordan Lee – sounds
- Jake Falby – violin
- George Folickman – bass
- Marc Merza – electric guitar
- Cameron Potter – drums
- Dillon Zahner – hand drums, percussion
- Virginia de la Pozas – vocals
- Cory Siegler – artwork, design, vocals
- Julie Byrne – vocals

Additional personnel

- Jake Yuhas – mastering
- Ali Carter – sound hunting
- Chico Jones – cacophony
- Austin Kalman – cacophony
- Stefan Grabowski – inspirational electronics
