= The Whaler =

Studio album by Home Is Where
- Released: June 16, 2023
- Recorded: 2022
- Studio: Atomic Garden East, Oakland, California, United States
- Genre: Emo
- Length: 35:00
- Language: English
- Label: Wax Bodega
- Producer: Jack Shirley

Home Is Where chronology
Dissection Lesson (2022)	The Whaler (2023)	Hunting Season (2025)

The Whaler is a 2023 studio album by American emo band Home Is Where, their first full-length release. The album has received positive reviews from critics.

== Reception ==
Writing for BrooklynVegan, Andrew Sacher writes about the diversity of the sounds on The Whaler as they "recall... anything from Neutral Milk Hotel to Fugazi to pageninetynine, often within the same song" and the lyrics are "about subject matter that feels real and authentic and depressing and I'd imagine it's widely relatable to anyone that's given up hope for a better world". A discussion of the album track-by-track in Consequence of Sound has author Jonah Kreuger characterizing the musical diversity as "frantically jump[ing] around different tempos, genres, and volumes, resulting in danceable sing-alongs fit for the apocalypse". Paste's Natalie Marlin gave this album an 8.0 out of 10, writing that this release "excels when it feels like Home Is Where are at its slipperiest as a band, conjuring something capable of breaking beyond a simple genre signifier". On June 19, that magazine ranked the best albums of the year so far, placing this at eleventh for "MacDonald’s commanding howls and yelps, alongside her jagged lyrical descriptiveness, that anchor each maneuver, complemented by guitarist Tilley Komorny’s fluid shifts in accentuating every disparate narrative". Stereogum named The Whaler Album of the Week, with critic Ian Cohen noting the depth of the lyrics, discussion personal and political themes and writing that the music has "a whimsy that turns both surly and surreal".

In Exclaim!, this was rated the 32nd best album of 2023. Paste included this among the 30 best rock albums of 2023. Editors at BrooklynVegan included this on their list of the 55 best albums of 2023.

== Track listing ==
All songs written by Home Is Where, with lyrics by Bea MacDonald.

1. "skin meadow" – 5:17
2. "lily pad pupils" – 5:21
3. "yes! yes! a thousand times yes!" – 3:54
4. "whaling for sport" – 3:19
5. "everyday feels like 9/11" – 3:31
6. "9/12" – 1:49
7. "daytona 500" – 3:44
8. "chris farley" – 2:06
9. "nursing home riot" – 3:21
10. "floral organs" – 2:31

== Personnel ==
Home Is Where

- Josiah Gardella – drums, tambourine, backing vocals
- Tilley Komorny – guitar, piano, organ, backing vocals, banjo, tambourine, jingle bells, mandolin, tape loops
- Bea MacDonald – singing, harmonica, singing saw, piano, organ, tambourine, jingle bells, mandolin, tape loops
- Connor "Fat Slaps" O'Brien – bass guitar, tambourine, backing vocals

Additional personnel

- Evan Bailey – piano
- Brian Lockrem – trumpet
- Foster Miller – album art
- Zak Nirenberg – trombone, backing vocals
- Dan Pot – pedal steel guitar
- Jack Shirley – tape loops, mixing, production, mastering
- Shannon Taylor – backing vocals
- Joey Tobin – documentation, field recordings

== See also ==
- List of 2023 albums
