= Dama Scout =

- Origin: London, England
- Genres: Art rock; indie rock; alt rock; alt pop; garage rock; noise rock; shoegaze; slacker rock
- Years active: 2016–present
- Labels: Hand in Hive; Father/Daughter Records
- Members: Eva Liu; Danny Grant; Luciano Rossi

Dama Scout are a British art rock trio consisting of Londoner Eva Liu and Glaswegians Luciano Rossi and Danny Grant. They released their self-titled debut EP in 2017 and their debut album gen wo lai (come with me) in 2022.

== Members ==
Bassist Luciano Rossi and drummer Danny Grant are childhood friends from Glasgow, while vocalist and guitarist Eva Liu was born in Belfast to Hong Kong parents and grew up in London. Rossi and Liu met through mutual friends in London and started writing music together. Rossi introduced her to Grant when Grant moved into his flat in Kentish Town, forming the trio.

As of 2021, Liu performs solo under the name Mui Zyu. Rossi is also a producer and a member of Idlewild.

== Career ==
Dama Scout made their debut in 2016, releasing the singles "Forget It's Good" and "All in Too".

In January 2017, Dama Scout substituted the artist Zuzu in The Line of Best Fit's Five Day Forecast show. Along singles "Paper Boy" in April and "Suzie Wong" in July, Dama Scout released their self-titled debut EP in 2017. Further singles that year included "Sugar" and "Toothache". Dama Scout performed at the Great Escape Festival and had gigs with Sports Team, Alex Lahey and Weaves.

The trio released the single "Milky Milk" in 2018. That year, Dama Scout returned to the Great Escape Festival. They also featured at Liverpool Sound City, All Points East, All Years Leaving, and had a gig with Gengahr.

After three years, Dama Scout returned in 2021 with the single "dan dan bub". The trio released their debut album gen wo lai (come with me) in 2022, accompanied by the singles "emails from suzanne" and "pineapple eyes".

== Artistry ==
Rossi and Grant spent their teens playing in local Glasgow metal and punk groups respectively. Liu grew up listening to Cantonese pop, as well as The Beatles and The Carpenters. Dama Scout has drawn comparisons to Nilüfer Yanya, Yuck, Tame Impala, Pixies, Speedy Ortiz, Palehound, and Swervedriver.

== Discography ==
=== Albums ===
- gen wo lai (come with me) (2022)

=== EPs ===
- Dama Scout (2017)

=== Singles ===
- "Forget It's Good" (2016)
- "All in Too" (2016)
- "Paper Boy" (2017)
- "Suzie Wong" (2017)
- "Sugar" (2017)
- "Toothache" (2017)
- "Milky Milk" (2018)
- "dan dan bub" (2021)
- "emails from suzanne" (2022)
- "pineapple eyes" (2022)
