= Home Is Where =

American emo band

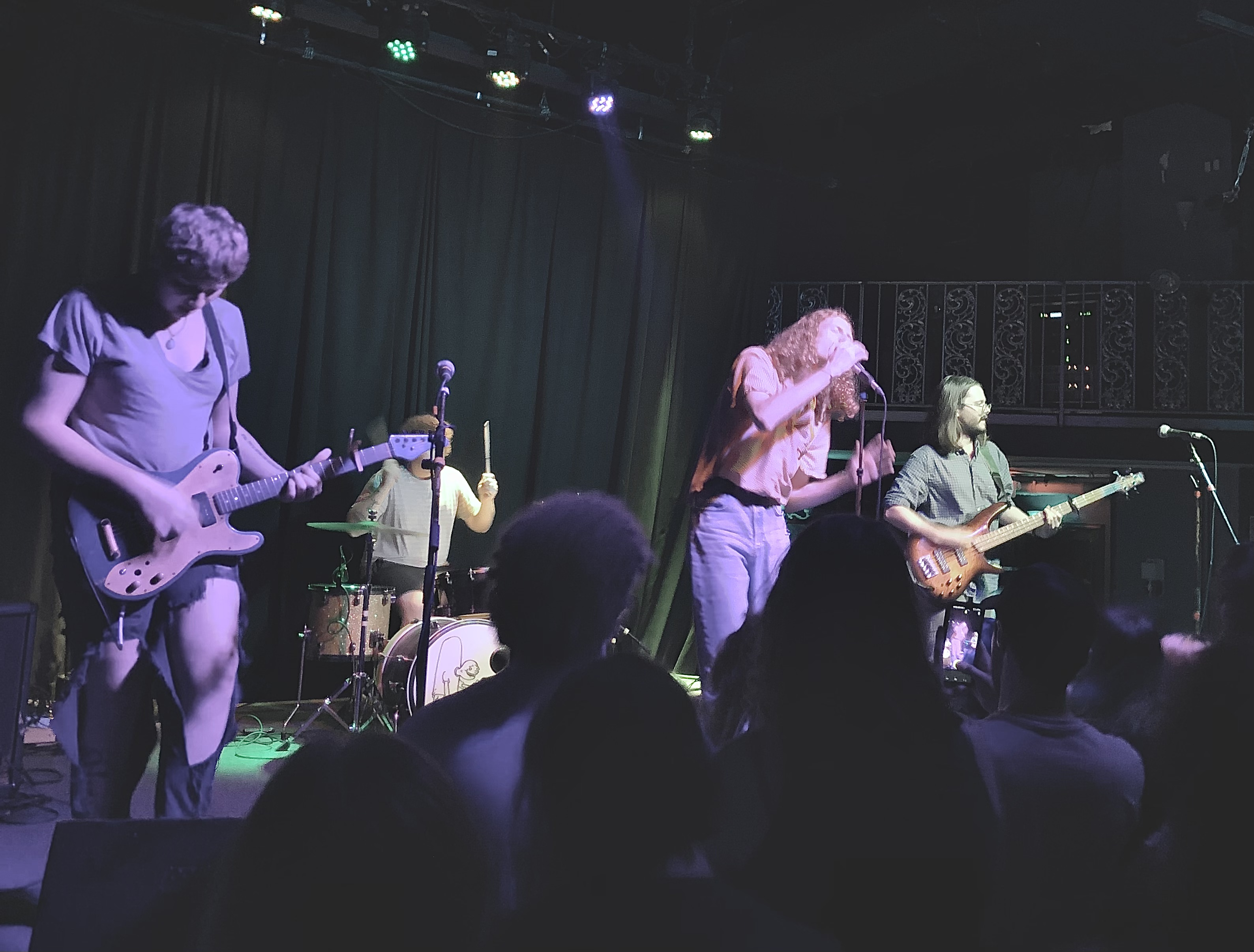
- Home Is Where performing at The Masquerade in Atlanta, Georgia in 2023.

Background information
- Origin: Palm Coast, Florida, U.S.
- Genres: Emo; post-hardcore; folk rock
- Years active: 2017–present
- Labels: Father/Daughter Records, Wax Bodega
- Members: Bea MacDonald; Tilley Komorny; Josiah Gardella; Connor "Fat Slaps" O'brien

Home Is Where is an American emo band from Palm Coast, Florida. The band has released three EPs and two albums. Their first EP, Our Mouths to Smile, was released in 2019. The second EP, I Became Birds, was released in 2021 and brought them considerably more attention, including landing on numerous end of the year lists. In 2022, they released a split EP with Denton, Texas emo band Record Setter titled dissection lesson. The band's first full-length LP, The Whaler, was released in June 2023, and then second full-length LP, Hunting Season, released in May 2025.

== Band members ==
Current

- Bea MacDonald – vocals, harmonica, singing saw
- Tilley Komorny – guitar
- Josiah Gardella – drums
- Connor "Fat Slaps" O'brien – bass

Former

- Trace George – guitar (2017–2020)

== Discography ==
=== Studio albums ===
Overview of Home Is Where albums
Title	Album details
The Whaler	Released: June 16, 2023; Label: Wax Bodega; Formats: Digital download, LP
Hunting Season	Released: May 23, 2025; Label: Wax Bodega; Formats: Digital download, LP

=== Extended plays ===
Title	Album details	Comments
our mouths to smile	Released: March 23, 2019; Label: Alotta Donuts Records; Formats: Digital download	
I Became Birds	Released: April 13, 2021; Label: Knifepunch, Father/Daughter Records; Formats: Digital download, cassette, LP	
dissection lesson (with Record Setter)	Released: April 15, 2022; Label: Topshelf, Father/Daughter Records; Formats: Digital download, cassette	Split EP
