= Vagabon (album) =

Studio album by Vagabon
- Released: October 19, 2019
- Recorded: July 2017 – March 2019
- Studios: Vagabon's Home Studio; SoundEQ Studios; Sunset Sound; Boulevard Studio
- Genres: Art pop; electronic pop; house; indie pop; new wave; synth-pop
- Length: 35:50
- Label: Nonesuch
- Producer: Laetitia Tamko

Vagabon chronology
Infinite Worlds (2017)	Vagabon (2019)	Sorry I Haven't Called (2023)

Singles from Vagabon
- 1. "Flood" Released: June 13, 2019; 2. "Water Me Down" Released: August 27, 2019; 3. "Every Woman" Released: October 24, 2019

Vagabon is the second studio album by Cameroon-born musician Laetitia Tamko, under the stage name Vagabon. It was released on October 19, 2019, through Nonesuch Records. Vagabon was written, arranged, and produced by Tamko.

Vagabon received universal acclaim from music critics, who praised the artist's change in sound from guitar-based indie rock to more orchestral, electronic indie pop. Vagabon appeared on several year-end best album lists in 2019.

== Background ==
Tamko began working on the album in 2017 after the release of her debut album Infinite Worlds that same year. Vagabon was originally titled All the Women in Me and scheduled for release on September 27, 2019. The title was a quote from a poem by Nayyirah Waheed. However, at the request of Waheed, the album title and several lyrics were changed due to her not approving Tamko quoting her, which caused the album to be pushed back to October 19, 2019. Two song titles also changed, including "Flood Hands" to "Flood" and "All the Women" to "Every Woman".

== Music and lyrics ==
The album's themes include empowerment, self-exploration, and understanding. Tamko cited Frank Ocean's Blonde album as a reference point for Vagabon, stating that she liked the way it conveyed a deep sense of intimacy. In an interview with Bandcamp, Tamko said that writing the record became a way for her to have an emotional reckoning with herself. "I was in a space in my life of not trying to feel like the victim and just move to survivorhood," she said. After she began working through her own trauma, she started examining the ways that she may have hurt others. "I was asking myself a lot of questions once I had the space to do it: 'What kind of person am I being? How am I to other people?' I'm turning the heat on myself."

=== Composition ===
Vagabon is unique for exchanging Tamko's rock sounds for a new electronic palette. It digs into "sleeker" house music and synth-pop, as well as art pop, electronic pop, indie pop and new wave. Its sound is also seen as fitting somewhere between bedroom pop and "emotive" electronica.

== Critical reception ==
Professional ratings
Aggregate scores
Source	Rating
AnyDecentMusic?	7.8/10
Metacritic	82/100
Review scores
Source	Rating
AllMusic	3.5/5 stars
Clash	9/10
DIY	4/5 stars
Exclaim!	8/10
The Guardian	4/5 stars
Paste	8.0/10
Pitchfork	7.6/10
The Skinny	5/5 stars
Slant	3.5/5 stars
Under the Radar	8/10

Vagabon was met with universal acclaim. At Metacritic, which assigns a normalized rating out of 100 to reviews from mainstream publications, the album received an average score of 82, based on 16 reviews.

Harry Todd of Paste described the album as "a more formless affair, a cosmic journey through synthetic sounds, lush orchestral suites and lyrical self-realization" and "an ambitious album overflowing with generosity and empathy, warm in production and rich in theme." Ann-Derrick Gaillot of Pitchfork wrote, "Vagabon concludes as a work of not only personal self-discovery, but evolution in real time." Lauren deHollogne of Clash declared the album "simply captivating from start to finish" and "the work of an immensely talented melodic mastermind." In her five-star review of the album, Bethany Davison of The Skinny wrote, "Vagabon is a record both stripped back yet electronically rich, genre disparate, but ultimately inclusive. A rewarding listen, it's an achievement beyond comprehension." Émilie Kneifel of Exclaim! summarized the album as "good both for bobbing heads and bopping feet — both for being alone-alone, and alone-around-others, too."

Year-end lists
Publication	Accolade	Rank	Ref.
NPR	The 25 Best Albums of 2019	11	
Nothing but Hope and Passion	The 50 Best Albums of 2019	37	
Under the Radar	The Top 100 Albums of 2019	72	
Vinyl Me, Please	The Best Albums of 2019	—	

== Track listing ==
All songs were written and produced by Laetitia Tamko.

No.	Title	Length
1.	"Full Moon in Gemini"	2:52
2.	"Flood"	3:44
3.	"Secret Medicine"	2:56
4.	"Water Me Down"	4:32
5.	"In a Bind"	3:40
6.	"Wits About You"	2:39
7.	"Please Don't Leave the Table"	3:41
8.	"Home Soon"	4:50
9.	"Every Woman"	3:27
10.	"Full Moon in Gemini (Monako Reprise)"	3:26

== Personnel ==
=== Musicians ===
According to the record's Bandcamp page.

Vagabon

- Laetitia Tamko – vocals (all tracks), drums (1, 2, 4, 6, 7), keyboards (1, 2, 6–8), guitars (2, 3, 5, 9), synths (2, 4, 6), bass (3), Wurlitzer (3), percussion (3, 5), piano (6)

Additional musicians

- Cameron Wisch – percussion
- Emily Elkin – cello
- Eric Littmann – drums and synths
- Evan Lawrence – bass guitar
- Jakob Hersch – guitar
- Jannik Schneider – drums
- Julie Byrne – additional vocals
- Kate Outterbridge – viola
- Laurens Bauer – bass guitar
- Meg Duffy – guitar
- Melina Duterte – trumpet
- Naomie De Lorimier – additional vocals
- Oliver Hill – violin and Wurlitzer
- Sadek Massarweh – guitar and additional vocals
- Sasami Ashworth – French horn
- Thomas Bartlett – synths

=== Technical ===
- Laetitia Tamko – producer, engineer
- Jason Agel – engineer
- Eric Littmann – engineer
- Andrew Lappin – engineer
- Thomas Bartlett – engineer
- John Congleton – mixer
- Ted Jensen – mastering
