= I Became Birds =

EP by Home Is Where
- Released: March 5, 2021
- Studio: Killian Studios
- Genre: Emo
- Length: 18:46
- Language: English
- Label: Father/Daughter, Knifepunch
- Producer: Matt Goings

Home Is Where chronology
| Our Mouths to Smile (2019) | I Became Birds (2021) | Dissection Lesson (2022) |

I Became Birds is a 2021 release by American emo band Home Is Where.

The EP's cover art is a 1977 photograph of Janet and Margaret Hodgson, the former claiming she was possessed by the Enfield poltergeist.

== Reception ==
In Exclaim!, the album was listed as one of the top 25 EPs of 2021, with Adam Feibel writing that "it feels like a fully realized epic of modern punk". (Despite the release's short length, the band considers it to be their debut LP.) Ian Cohen of Pitchfork Media rated the album an 8.0 out of 10, writing that the band "channels a sense of boundless possibility" and summing up that this release "feels like emo once again flipping the switch on its eternal energy source"; the venue would list it among the best rock albums of 2021. PopMatters' Michael Frank Lukich calls this music "therapeutic" and compares it favorably to music by Bob Dylan, Fugazi, and Neutral Milk Hotel, rating it an 8 out of 10. Nina Corcoran of Stereogum named Home Is Where a "Band to Watch" for "the pitch-perfect decisions of their songs" on this release. The site ranked it 8th on its list of the 50 best albums of 2021 on June 8, with critic Julia Gray calling it "a parade of harmonicas, strings, horns, and acoustic guitars", with lyrics that include "breathless images and musings" and vocals made up of "whispers mutating into guttural yelps".

== Track listing ==
All songs written by Home Is Where, with lyrics by Bea MacDonald.

1. "l. ron hubbard was way cool" – 1:40
2. "long distance conjoined twins" – 3:27
3. "sewn together from the membrane of the great sea cucumber" – 4:46
4. "the scientific classification of stingrays" – 2:19
5. "assisted harakiri" – 4:30
6. "the old country" – 2:05

== Personnel ==
Home Is Where

- Josiah Gardella – drums
- Trace George – guitar
- Bea MacDonald – singing, harmonica, singing saw
- Connor "Fat Slaps" O'Brien – bass guitar

Additional personnel

- Matt Goings – synthesizer, tambourine, mixing, production, mastering
- Ellie Kovach – liner notes
- Wes Meadows – horns
- Christiana Patterson – violin
- The Puppy Petter Choir – backing vocals on "sewn together from the membrane of the great sea cucumber"
  - Haley Craycraft
  - Josiah Gardella
  - Trace George
  - Matt Goings
  - Emily James
  - Bea MacDonald
  - Connor "Fat Slaps" O'Brien
  - Christiana Patterson

== See also ==
- List of 2021 albums
