= Tasha (musician) =

American musician

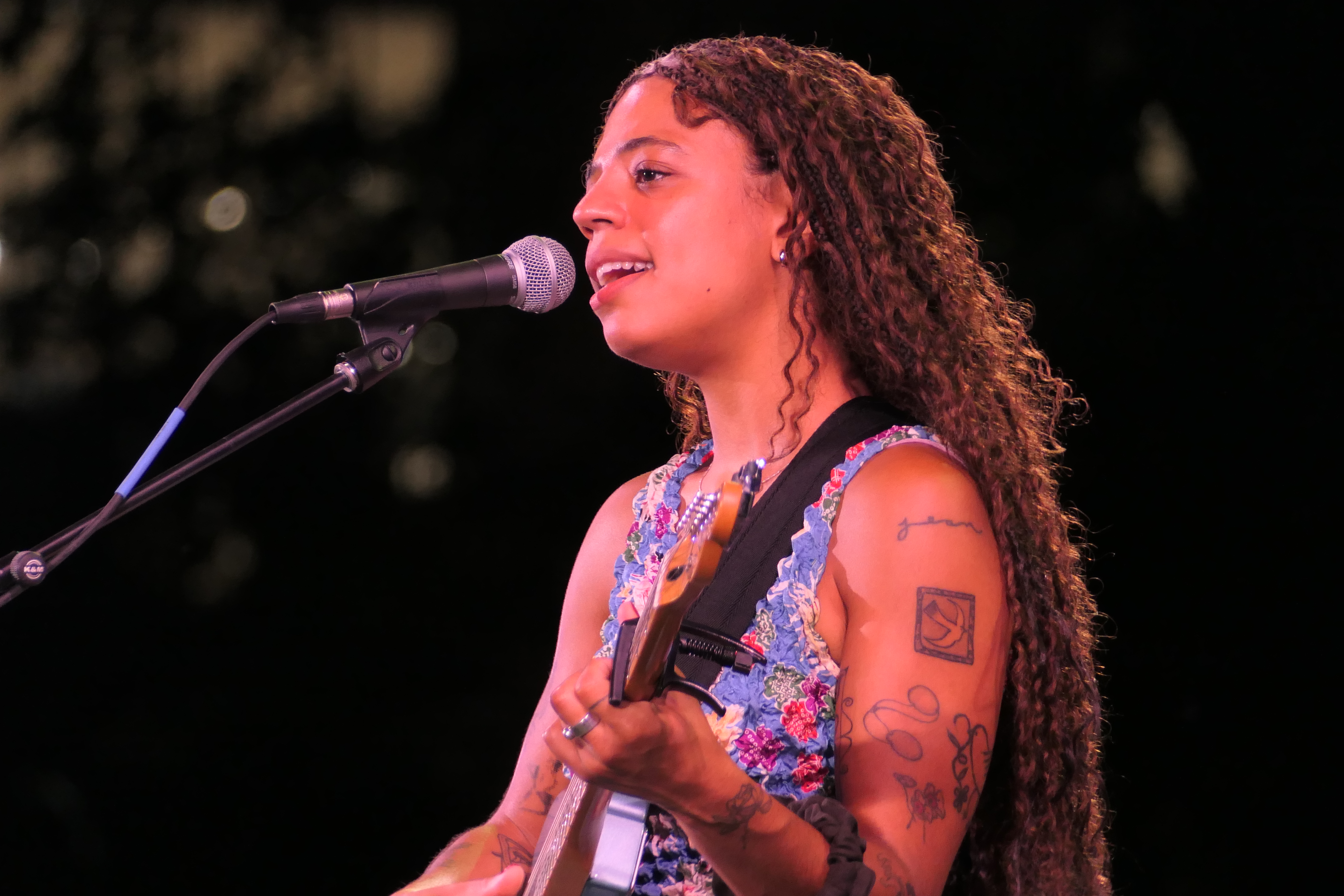
- Tasha performing at Bryant Park

Background information
- Born: Tasha Viets-VanLear
- Origin: Albany Park, Chicago, U.S.
- Genres: Singer-songwriter
- Instrument: Guitar
- Years active: 2016–present
- Website: Wowtashawow.com

Tasha Viets-VanLear, better known as just Tasha, is an American musician from Chicago.

== Early life ==
Tasha was born and raised in the Albany Park neighborhood of Chicago. Tasha grew up involved in theater and poetry, attending Northside College Preparatory High School and later, St. Olaf College. After returning to Chicago post-college, Tasha worked for Black Youth Project 100.

== Career ==
Tasha released her first EP in 2016 titled Divine Love. The EP is described as being about both "political activism and self-love". In 2018, Tasha announced plans to release her debut full-length album, and shared the new song "Kind of Love". Tasha also shared a new song titled "New Place" prior to releasing the record. The album, titled Alone at Last, was released in 2018 through Father/Daughter Records.

In April 2020, Tasha shared a new song titled "But There's Still the Moon".

Tasha's second full-length album, Tell Me What You Miss the Most, was released on November 5, 2021. Her third album All This and So Much More was released on Bayonet Records in September 2024.

== Discography ==
=== Studio albums ===
- Alone at Last (2018)
- Tell Me What You Miss the Most (2021)
- All This and So Much More (2024)
- You Are Spring! (2026)

=== EPs ===
- Divine Love (2016)
