= Do You Wonder About Me? =

Studio album by Diet Cig
- Released: May 1, 2020
- Studio: Headroom Studios
- Length: 24:38
- Label: Frenchkiss
- Producer: Chris Daly

Diet Cig chronology
Swear I'm Good At This (2017)	Do You Wonder About Me? (2020)

Professional ratings
Aggregate scores
Source	Rating
Metacritic	70/100
Review scores
Source	Rating
AllMusic	4/5 stars
Beats Per Minute	59%
Clash	8/10
Exclaim!	8/10
The Line of Best Fit	8/10
MusicOMH	3.5/5 stars
Our Culture Mag	3.5/5 stars

Do You Wonder About Me? is the second studio album by American indie rock band Diet Cig. It was released on May 1, 2020 under Frenchkiss Records.

== Critical reception ==
Do You Wonder About Me? was met with generally favorable reviews from critics. At Metacritic, which assigns a weighted average rating out of 100 to reviews from mainstream publications, this release received an average score of 70, based on 14 reviews.

== Track listing ==
Do You Wonder About Me? track listing
No.	Title	Length
1.	"Thriving"	3:42
2.	"Who Are You"	3:23
3.	"Night Terrors"	2:31
4.	"Priority Mail"	0:53
5.	"Broken Body"	3:19
6.	"Makeout Interlude"	1:11
7.	"Flash Flood"	1:35
8.	"Worth the Wait"	2:05
9.	"Stare into the Sun"	3:11
10.	"Night Terrors (Reprise)"	2:48
