= Sorry I Haven't Called =

Studio album by Vagabon
- Released: September 15, 2023
- Recorded: 2021–2022
- Length: 34:07
- Label: Nonesuch
- Producers: Laetitia Tamko; Rostam Batmanglij

Vagabon chronology
Vagabon (2019)	Sorry I Haven't Called (2023)

Singles from Vagabon
- 1. "Carpenter" Released: January 13, 2023; 2. "Can I Talk My Shit?" Released: June 15, 2023; 3. "Do Your Worst" Released: July 20, 2023; 4. "Lexicon" Released: September 12, 2023

Sorry I Haven't Called is the third studio album by Cameroon-born musician Laetitia Tamko, under the stage name Vagabon. It was released on September 15, 2023, through Nonesuch.

== Background ==
Tamko moved to a remote village in Northern Germany in late 2021, where she wrote and recorded most of the album. The project is dedicated to collaborator Eric Littmann, who died in June 2021. However, she clarified that the music had nothing to do with her grief but being "full of life and energy". According to her, she did not intend to be "introspective" but just wanted to have fun with the album. The album was co-produced by Tamko herself and Rostam Batmanglij of Vampire Weekend, who helped her finish the record in late 2022. Inspired by dance music, the record represents the way she communicates with her friends and lovers. She believes that "honesty and conversational songwriting can become poetry" without the use of "metaphors and without flowery imagery".

She announced the album on June 15, 2023, and released the lead single "Can I Talk My Shit?", an "understated and blissfully chill track", the same day. Along with the record, Tamko announced a set of headlining shows in the United States and Europe with supporting act Weyes Blood starting in October 2023.

== Critical reception ==
Professional ratings
Aggregate scores
Source	Rating
AnyDecentMusic?	7.5/10
Metacritic	79/100
Review scores
Source	Rating
AllMusic	4/5 stars
Clash	8/10
DIY	4/5 stars
Loud and Quiet	8/10
MusicOMH	3.5/5 stars
Paste	8.3/10
Pitchfork	7.4/10
The Skinny	4/5 stars
Slant Magazine	3/5 stars

Sorry I Haven't Called received a score of 79 out of 100 on review aggregator Metacritic based on eight critics' reviews, indicating a "generally favorable" reception. Jo Higgs at The Skinny could confirm the intentions behind the record and stated that the album is indeed "not premised on sorrow but instead delineates a pathway to joy", calling it another one of Tamko's "majestic reinventions". Likewise, DIY's Jack Terry reiterated Tamko's sentiments when recording the album, calling it a "pursuit of happiness" without the use of "mysterious metaphors or lofty linguistics". Charles Lyons-Burt of Slant Magazine thought Tamko delivered a "serviceable enough pop effort" but most of her "edges have been sadly sanded away", as she "leans in a more tonally upbeat direction than her previous releases". Reviewing the album for Pitchfork, Mary Retta described it as a "bright, dewy electro-pop album [that] depicts growing up with candor and levity" as well as observing that it "illustrates a shift in Tamko's storytelling: She sidesteps diffuse, open-ended imagery for blunt, informal observations".

== Track listing ==
Sorry I Haven't Called track listing
No.	Title	Writer(s)	Producer(s)	Length
1.	"Can I Talk My Shit?"	Laetitia Tamko; Jack McLaine; Donna Missal; Trayer Tryon	Tamko; Rostam Batmanglij; McLaine^{[a]}; Tryon^{[a]}	3:25
2.	"Carpenter"	Tamko; McLaine	Tamko; Batmanglij; McLaine^{[a]}	3:19
3.	"You Know How"	Tamko; Batmanglij	Tamko; Batmanglij	2:44
4.	"Lexicon"	Tamko; Batmanglij; Casey Manierka-Quaile	Tamko; Batmanglij; Manierka-Quaile^{[a]}	2:57
5.	"Passing Me By"	Tamko; McLaine	Tamko; Batmanglij; McLaine^{[a]}	3:13
6.	"Autobahn"	Tamko; Manierka-Quaile	Tamko; Batmanglij; Manierka-Quaile^{[a]}	3:28
7.	"Nothing to Lose"	Tamko	Tamko; Batmanglij	2:22
8.	"It's a Crisis"	Tamko; Batmanglij	Tamko; Batmanglij	2:32
9.	"Do Your Worst"	Tamko; Jakob Hersch; Sadek Massarweh	Tamko; Batmanglij; Teo Halm^{[a]}; Hersch^{[a]}; Massarweh^{[a]}	3:27
10.	"Interlude"	Tamko	Tamko; Batmanglij; Manierka-Qualie^{[a]}	0:44
11.	"Made Out with Your Best Friend"	Tamko; Batmanglij; Manierka-Quaile	Tamko; Batmanglij; Manierka-Quaile^{[a]}	2:45
12.	"Anti-Fuck"	Tamko; BatmanglijHersch	Tamko; Batmanglij; Hersch^{[a]}; Massarweh^{[a]}	3:11
Total length:				34:07

Note

- ^{^[a]} signifies an additional producer.

== Personnel ==
Musicians

- Laetitia Tamko – lead vocals (all tracks), samples (tracks 1, 5, 6), drum programming (2, 8, 9), electric guitar (2, 7, 12), piano (5); Mellotron, voice samples (10); programming (11), drums (12)
- Rostam Batmanglij – synthesizer (1–3, 6, 7, 9–12), Mellotron (1, 9), upright piano (1, 12), drum programming (2–11), bass (2, 4, 9–11), electric guitar (2, 5), percussion (2, 7, 9), synthesizer programming (3, 4); harmonica, Juno synthesizer, nylon-string guitar, wah wah guitar (4); programming (6), machine drums (7), Wurlitzer (9), drums (12)
- Jack McLaine – drum programming (1, 5); bass, programming (2); synthesizer (5)
- Julie Byrne – backing vocals, synthesizer (1)
- Joey Messina-Doerning – congas, percussion (2); bass (12)
- Andrew Tachine – drums (4, 7, 9)
- Casey Manierka-Quaile – programming (4); organ, Wurlitzer (6); synthesizer (7, 10, 11), drum programming (10, 11)
- Henry Solomon – saxophone (8)
- Teo Halm – drum programming, samples (9)
- Sadek Massarweh – electric guitar (9)
- Jakob Hersch – programming, synthesizer (9); acoustic guitar, electric guitar (12)

Technical

- Chris Allgood – mastering
- Emily Lazar – mastering
- Andrew Maury – mixing
- Rostam Batmanglij – engineering
- Joey Messina-Doerning – engineering
- Laetitia Tamko – engineering
- Alex Tumay – additional mixing (2)
- Jack McLaine – additional engineering (2, 5)
- Jeremy Hatcher – additional engineering (4, 7)
- Andrew Kim – mixing assistance (2)
- Nacor Zuluaga – mixing assistance (2)

== Charts ==
Chart performance for Sorry I Haven't Called
Chart (2023)	Peak position
Hungarian Physical Albums (MAHASZ)	11
