= Luke Winslow-King =

American musician (born 1983)

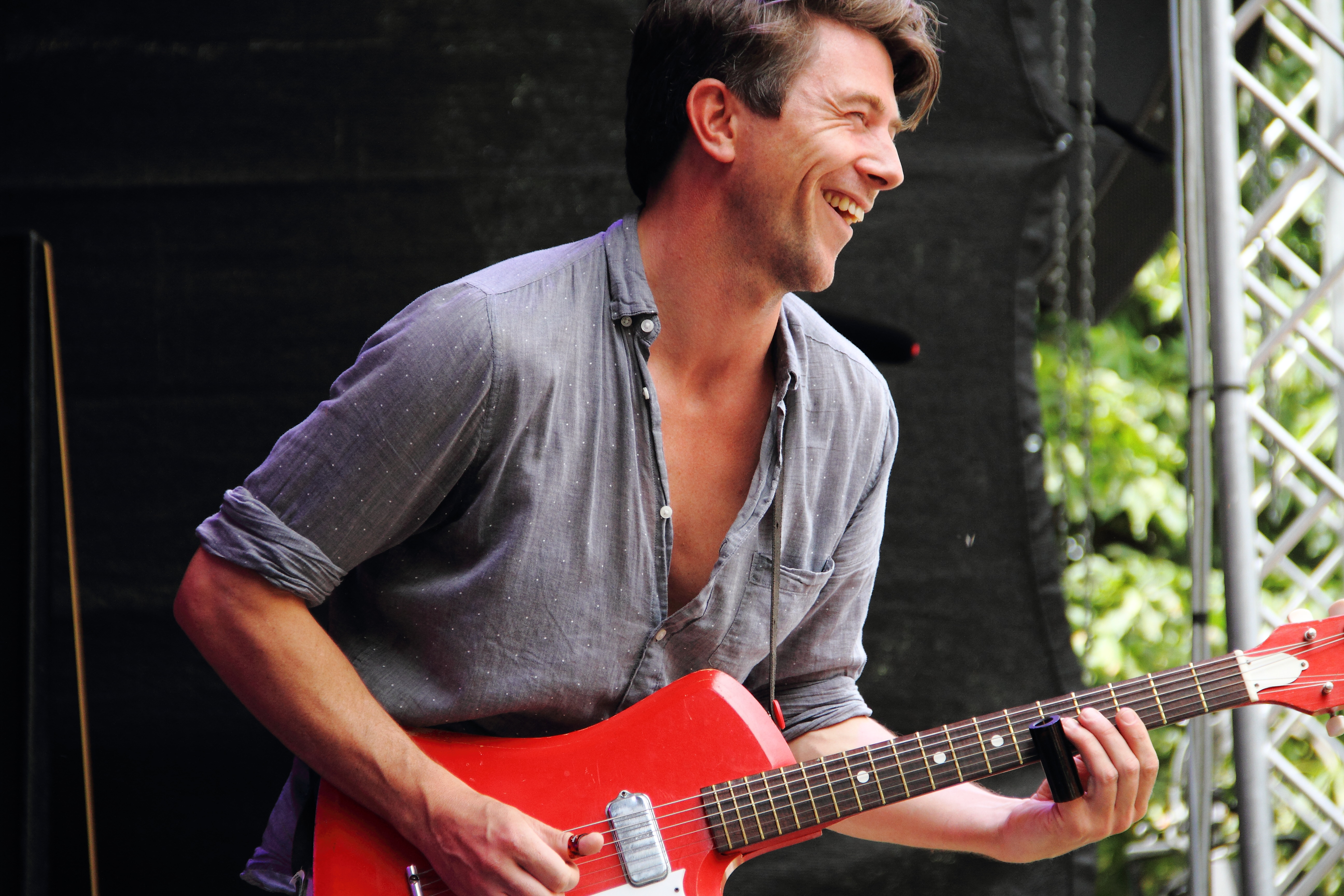
- Rudolstadt-Festival 2016

Background information
- Born: Luke Winslow-King Balzuweit; March 12, 1983 (age 43); Cadillac, Michigan, U.S.
- Origin: Cadillac, Michigan, U.S.
- Genres: Blues, Americana, folk jazz, country blues, jazz, ragtime
- Occupations: Singer-songwriter guitarist
- Instruments: Vocals guitar
- Years active: 2001–present
- Labels: Fox on a Hill Records; Bloodshot Records
- Members: Cassidy Holden; Benji Bohannon; Ben Polcer
- Past members: Esther Rose
- Website: lukewinslowking.com

Luke Winslow-King Balzuweit (born March 12, 1983) is an American guitarist, multi-instrumentalist, singer, composer, and lyricist. Winslow-King plays vintage blues and jazz music and is known for his slide guitar work. He is a music traditionalist, playing a mixture of "people's music" and improvisational jazz based in collective improvisation. He has been influenced by the music of New Orleans, where he was based for 15 years. These influences include jazz, Delta blues, ragtime, pre-war American folk, Béla Bartók and Antonín Dvořák's String Quartet No. 12 (American String Quartet), and Woody Guthrie.

== Early life and education ==
Winslow-King was born in Cadillac, Michigan. His mother, Kathy Balzuweit (née King), is a painter and farmer and founded the soup kitchen called the Shepherd's Table in Cadillac. His father, Kurt Balzuweit was a musician and worked at a hospital. Winslow-King grew up in the Baptist church. On his maternal side, Winslow-King's family comes from the Winslow descendants of the Mayflower.

Winslow-King began playing guitar at a young age, and played the French horn in middle school. He often played in church. Starting at the age of 14, he performed with his band, Luke Winslow-King Blues Band, and did a weekly gig at McGuire's Resort in Cadillac.

In 2001, Winslow-King graduated from Interlochen Center for the Arts with a major in jazz guitar, and where he also studied bebop jazz.

In 2002, Winslow-King attended Western Michigan University in Kalamazoo, Michigan. In 2003, he began attending the University of New Orleans, where he was in the music theory and composition program. While there, he also studied classical music. In the summer of 2003, Winslow-King spent the summer in the Czech Republic after he won an ambassador scholarship to study Czech music at Charles University in Prague.

== Career ==
During the fall of 2002 when he was 19 years old, after dropping out of college after a semester at Western Michigan University, Winslow-King went on a cross-country tour with musicians Seth Bernard and Daniel Kahn, playing Woody Guthrie songs in a show called "From California to the New York Island." While making a stop in New Orleans, the band's car and instruments were stolen after being parked on Ursulines Street in the Tremé district. The theft meant Winslow-King had to spend time in New Orleans. During the weeks he was there, when they got the van back, but no instruments, Winslow-King fell in love with the city, and in 2001 decided to permanently relocate to New Orleans. He knew the soul singer John Boutté of the band ¡Cubanismo! during their stop at Mackinac Island, and soon got a first-hand immersion into the local music scene, often busking on the street and playing with various bands and musicians – like "Washboard Chaz" Leary, George Porter Jr., Paul Sanchez's "Nine Lives" project, Roberto Luti, The Loose Marbles Jazz Band – in the city. He often played at local New Orleans clubs like Three Muses and DBA on Frenchmen Street in the 7th Ward.

From 2004 to 2006, Winslow-King moved to New York City after 2005's Hurricane Katrina. He lived in Harlem and worked as a music therapist for people with developmental disability (blind, mentally disabled) at the Institute of Applied Human Dynamics (IAHD) in the Bronx neighborhood of New York City. He also taught music at the Lavelle School for the Blind, in the Bronx. While living in New York City, Winslow-King studied composition and worked with avant-garde composer "Blue" Gene Tyranny and played in Jack Hardy's well-known songwriter's circle.

In 2006, Winslow-King co-founded the Michigan-based music label, Earthwork Music, with local Michigan musicians with whom he was friendly. Winslow-King wrote many of the songs, a mix of classical string quartet music and songwriting, with his ex-girlfriend, the musician Ji Un Choi.

In 2007, Winslow-King moved back to New Orleans and released his self-titled debut via Earthwork on his own imprint, Fox on a Hill.

His 2009 record, Old/New Baby, was recorded at Preservation Hall and was distributed by EMusic. American Songwriter named it one of 2009's Top 10 Record. Winslow-King performed as the Luke Winslow-King Trio with Jason Jurzak playing sousaphone and Richie Levinson playing washboard.

In 2012, Winslow-King signed with Chicago-based independent record label, Bloodshot Records. At the time his band was a trio made up of Winslow-King on vocals and guitar, Esther Rose on vocals and washboard, and Cassidy Holden on upright base.

In 2013, Winslow-King released his third record, The Coming Tide, on Bloodshot Records.

In 2014, Winslow-King released Everlasting Arms on Bloodshot.

In September 2016, Winslow-King released I’m Glad Trouble Don't Last Always on Bloodshot. The record was influenced by his divorce and his move back to northern Michigan in August 2016 to be with his father, who was diagnosed with cancer. The song "Esther Please" is about his ex-wife. Contributors to the record were Roberto Luti on guitar, Brennan Andes on electric bass, Mike Lynch on keyboards, and Benji Bohannon on drums. Colin DuPuis (The Black Keys) mixed the record, which was partially recorded live while on tour in Livorno, Italy.

In 2018, Winslow-King released his sixth record, which is called Blue Mesa, on Bloodshot. Blue Mesa was recorded in Lari, Italy, in Tuscany, and is a departure from his prior record, more upbeat and broader in diversity of sound and topics. Contributing to the recording were Ben Polcer on trumpet, Dominick Grillo on baritone sax, Matt Rhody on violin, and Chris Davis on drums. Tracks "Chicken Dinner" and "You Got Mine" were co-written with one of his New Orleans–based mentors, "Washboard" Lissa Driscoll, who died in 2017 of throat cancer. "Farewell Blues" is in homage to his father, who died in 2017. The record has received positive reviews.

His current band is made up of Roberto Luti on slide guitar, Christian Carpenter on bass guitar, Mike Lynch (Bob Seger, Larry McCray) on organ, and Chris Davis (King James and the Special Men) on drums.

Winslow-King released his most recent album, If These Walls Could Talk, in May 2022. Recorded in Memphis in 2020 and produced by Dominic Davis (Jack White, Willie Nelson, North Mississippi Allstars), it featured guest performances from Davis, Roberto Luti, Reverend Charles Hodges (Al Green), and The Sensational Barnes Brothers.

=== Other work ===
In 1993, Winslow-King and his sister were extras in the Bill Murray movie, Groundhog Day.

Winslow-King has worked as a composer for both theater and film. Winslow-King wrote the music that ran in the credits of the March 2014 extended pilot episode of NCIS: New Orleans. He also appeared in the episode.

His song, "Swing That Thing," from 2014 his record Everlasting Arms was directed by the comedian Kyle Newacheck from Workaholics. It was filmed in New Orleans at the Balcony Room at Blue Nile.

== Personal life ==
From 2013 to 2015, Winslow-King was married to singer-songwriter Esther Rose. They performed together over a period of six years. She also had a fashion line at the store Bon Castor in New Orleans and influenced the Winslow-Kings' stage outfits. The couple lived in Arabi, St. Bernard Parish Louisiana. Winslow-King was often known for wearing vintage clothes on stage.

In November 2014, Winslow was arrested and incarcerated for three weeks in northern Michigan for the possession of a small amount of marijuana. He spent that time almost entirely in solitary confinement due to a serious nut allergy.

In 2017, Winslow-King relocated to his hometown of Cadillac, Michigan, after living in New Orleans for over 15 years. Now he lives in Asturias (Spain).

== Discography ==
=== Records ===
- Luke Winslow King (2008)
- Old/New Baby (2009)
- The Coming Tide (2013)
- Everlasting Arms (2014)
- I’m Glad Trouble Don't Last Always (2016)
- Blue Mesa (2018)
- If These Walls Could Talk (2022)

=== 7-inch ===
- You Hear Me Talkin' To Ya (2011)

=== Contributions ===
- Ghost Glacier by Breathe Owl Breathe (2008)
- Lucky Devil by Meschiya Lake and the Little Big Horns (2012)
- Vari-colored Songs (A Tribute To Langston Hughes) by Leyla McCalla (2013)

== Honors ==
- 2010: Offbeat Magazine's Best of the Beat Awards (nominee) for Best Emerging Artist
- 2011: Offbeat Magazine's Best of the Beat Awards (nominee) Best Singer-Songwriter
- 2011: American Songwriter's Writer of the Week
- 2012: Offbeat Magazine's Best of the Beat Awards (nominee) for Best Country/Folk/Singer-Songwriter Album for The Coming Tide
- 2013: Offbeat Magazine's Best of the Beat Awards (nominee) for Best Male Performer
- 2014: Offbeat Magazine's Best of the Beat Awards (nominee) for Best Blues Performer
- 2014: AllMusic Favorite Blues Albums for Everlasting Arms
- 2015: Gambit Magazine's Best of New Orleans, Best Album (nominee) for Everlasting Arms
- 2015: Gambit Magazine's Best of New Orleans, Best Blues Performer
- 2016: Offbeat Magazine's Best of the Beat Awards (nominee) for Song of the Year for "No More Crying Today"
- 2016: Offbeat Magazine's Best of the Beat Awards (nominee) for Best Blues Album for I’m Glad Trouble Don't Last Always"
- 2016: Offbeat Magazine's Best of the Beat Awards (nominee) for Best Blues Performer"
- 2016: AllMusic Favorite Blues Albums and Favorite Folk and Americana Albums for I'm Glad Trouble Don't Last Always
