= Anna McClellan =

American musician

Anna McClellan is an American musician based in Omaha, Nebraska.

== History ==
McClellan released her first full-length album in October 2015, titled Fire Flames, on Portland based label Majestic Litter. In February 2018, McClellan released her second full-length record titled Yes and No, after having signed to the record label Father/Daughter Records. In September 2020, McClellan announced plans to release her third full-length album. The album, titled I Saw First Light, was released on November 20, 2020. She released the album Electric Bouquet in 2024.

== Discography ==
=== Studio albums ===
- Fire Flames (2015, Majestic Litter)
- Yes and No (2018, Father/Daughter)
- I Saw First Light (2020, Father/Daughter)
- Electric Bouquet (2024, Father/Daughter)
