= Pwr Bttm =

American punk duo

PWR BTTM
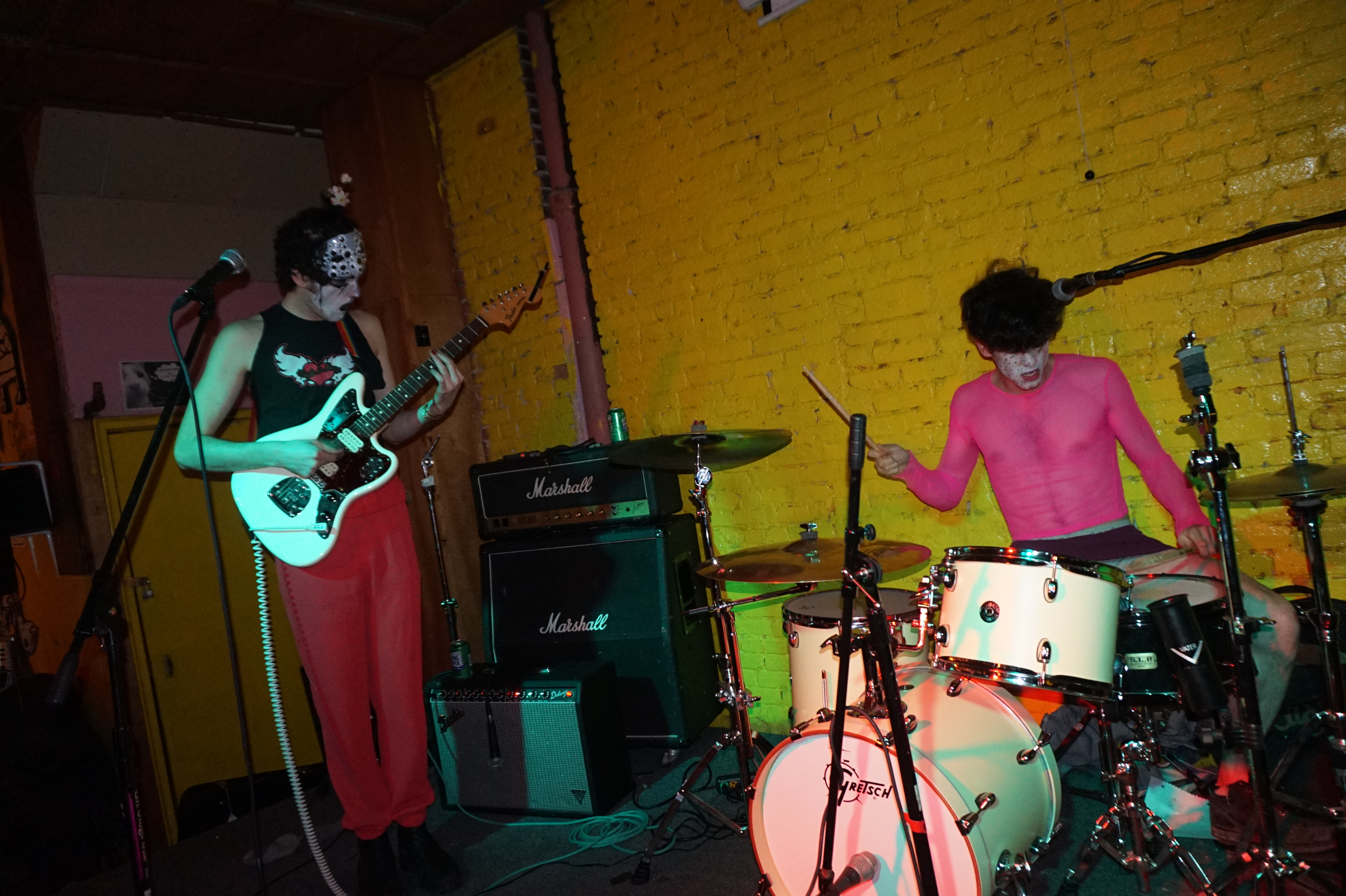
- Pwr Bttm live in 2015

Background information
- Origin: Annandale-on-Hudson, New York, U.S.
- Genres: Punk rock; garage punk; indie rock; queercore
- Years active: 2013–2017
- Labels: Big Scary Monsters; Father/Daughter; Miscreant; Polyvinyl
- Members: Liv Bruce; Ben Hopkins

Pwr Bttm (disemvoweling of Power Bottom), stylized PWR BTTM, was an American queer punk duo formed in 2013 at Bard College by Ben Hopkins and Liv Bruce. The duo's debut album, Ugly Cherries, was released in 2015. Their second studio album, Pageant, was released in 2017 to critical acclaim. Pageant's release was preceded by sexual abuse allegations against Ben Hopkins, which led to the duo being dropped by both Polyvinyl and Big Scary Monsters. Pwr Bttm denied the allegations and the band broke up that same year after a falling-out between its two members.

== History ==
=== Formation and Ugly Cherries (2013–2015) ===
Bruce and Hopkins met in 2011 while they were both attending Bard College in southeastern New York State. The band was originally a trio which played many shows at Bard College. Bruce and Hopkins spent several months working together and developing their skills as a pair before playing their first show and releasing their first demo, Cinderella Beauty Shop (2014).

Inspired by Limp Wrist and other queercore bands, Liv Bruce came up with potential band names like Hissy Fit and My Ass Hurts before deciding on Pwr Bttm. The duo's name is a vowel-less take on the term "power bottom", which is described by Fusion writer John Walker in a September 2015 article as "a receptive partner who eschews submission to play a dominant role during sex", meaning that while someone is "bottoming", they maintain the dominant power in a sexual interaction. Bruce and Hopkins both felt the name suited the group as a label of empowerment.

Pwr Bttm's debut album, Ugly Cherries, was released on September 18, 2015.

=== Pageant, allegations of sexual abuse and band split ===
On May 10, 2017, two days before the release of Pageant, Kitty Cordero-Kolin posted in a Facebook group informing members that Ben Hopkins is a "known sexual predator" and Cordero-Kolin had allegedly witnessed Ben initiate unwanted sexual contact with people. Although the Facebook group was private, a screenshot of the post was captured and shared widely via Facebook, Twitter, and Reddit.

In light of these allegations, several bands that were initially scheduled to join Pwr Bttm on their summer 2017 tour in support of Pageant pulled out of their shows. Nnamdi Ogbonnaya expressed in a Facebook post that he could not comfortably continue touring with Pwr Bttm. T-Rextasy, who were set to perform with Pwr Bttm in July, expressed on Twitter their regret that these allegations were not a shock to them, having been previously warned by a fan who claimed to have been nonconsensually approached by Hopkins but asked not to have their experience shared; although apprehensive of damaging their professional relationships by pulling out of the show with no official reason, they later publicly regretted their initial decision to play and announced their cancellation. Ratboys, Iji, and Tancred also removed themselves from the tour. Two touring members of Pwr Bttm, Cameron West and Nicholas Cummins, also announced via social media that they were ending their affiliations with the band. Amidst these allegations, the band was also dropped by their management company, Salty Artist Management.

One day before the release of their second studio album, Pageant, the band officially addressed the allegations in a Facebook post on May 11. The band stated they were "shocked" and offered an email address where survivors and/or their contacts can discuss the allegations made against Hopkins, claiming they were unaware of violating anyone's consent. On May 12, Jezebel published an interview with a survivor, who disclosed her supposed encounter with Hopkins and asserted their official statement was "100% false", stating she informed Hopkins' bandmate Liv Bruce of the incident months prior. Touring member Cameron West also cited Bruce's supposed prior knowledge of the allegations as one of his reasons for leaving.

On May 13, Polyvinyl Records responded to the allegations by stating they would no longer be selling or distributing Pwr Bttm's music or merchandise. They willingly offered refunds to purchasers and announced they would donate to RAINN and the Anti-Violence Project in light of the allegations. UK label BSM Recordings and US label Father/Daughter Records also announced the following day that they would no longer be working with the band. On the same day, Off Broadway Music Venue, a music venue in St.Louis, posted on Facebook: "PWR BTTM is canceling all upcoming shows until further notice." Although the band had yet to comment, the page assured readers that "[they] will be making a formal statement early next week."

On May 14, at least 15 North American venues had either removed event pages or specifically announced their cancellations in statements following the allegations. Planned performances at Raleigh, NC's Hopscotch Music Festival and Howell, MI's Bled Fest had also been removed.

On May 15, the band's discography was removed from online retailers Amazon Music and the iTunes Store, as well as the music streaming services Apple Music, Tidal, and Google Play Music. On May 17, their music was removed from Spotify as well, although it has since returned to that service.

On May 18, the band released statements denying the sexual assault claims against Hopkins. Despite being the last official statement released by the band or its individual members, the band's official Twitter account tweeted a photo of a vintage motorcycle with no context on November 27, 2017. After receiving backlash for posting, the band deleted the tweet entirely.

In July 2020, just over three years after the allegations, Hopkins announced an upcoming solo album, while also revealing that the band had indeed split up in 2017, after a falling-out between its two members.

In August 2020, Hopkins, now playing and recording music as Benjamin Walter Hopkins, released "Laugh Track", as well as several other singles. Hopkins hinted that the new tracks could be the foundation for a new full-length project.

== Influences ==
Ben Hopkins wanted to become a musician after watching Christina Aguilera, Pink, Mýa and Lil' Kim perform "Lady Marmalade" at the 2001 MTV Movie Awards. Hopkins has been influenced by rock bands Nirvana and Led Zeppelin as well as "artists with female-identifying singers" such as Rilo Kiley, Joanna Newsom, Imogen Heap and the latter's band Frou Frou. They also took inspiration from queer artists Mykki Blanco, Reza Abdoh, Taylor Mac, Justin Vivian Bond and Eddie Izzard, whose film Dress to Kill (1998) they would watch daily.

Liv Bruce was influenced by Limp Wrist, Scissor Sisters and Rufus Wainwright, who they listened to when they were growing up.

The duo cited R.E.M., James Taylor, and Neutral Milk Hotel as inspirations for their album Pageant.

== Members ==
- Liv Bruce – drums, vocals, guitar (2013–2017)
- Ben Hopkins – guitar, vocals, drums (2013–2017)

Former touring members

- Michael "Mike P" Politowicz – bass guitar (2016–2017)
- Nicholas Cummins – bass guitar, backing vocals (2015–2017)
- Maile Hamilton – bass guitar (2013)
- Taliana Katz – bass guitar (2016–2017)
- Cameron West – French horn, keyboard, percussion (2016–2017)

== Discography ==
Studio albums
Title	Released
Ugly Cherries	September 18, 2015
Pageant	May 12, 2017

EPs
Title	Released
Cinderella Beauty Shop	May 25, 2014
Republican National Convention (split with Jawbreaker Reunion)	February 14, 2015

Singles
Title	Released
"Ugly Cherries"	July 13, 2015
"Dairy Queen"	August 18, 2015
"Projection"	July 21, 2016
"New Hampshire"	August 17, 2016
"Big Beautiful Day"	February 14, 2017
"Answer My Text"	March 7, 2017
