= Annie Blackman =

American singer-songwriter

- Born: July 1, 1998 (age 28)
- Origin: Montclair, New Jersey
- Genre: Indie folk
- Occupation: Singer-songwriter
- Instruments: Vocals, guitar
- Years active: 2016–present
- Label: Father/Daughter Records

Annie Blackman (born 1998) is an American musician.

== Early life ==
Annie Blackman was born in Montclair, New Jersey. In the 5th grade, she was inspired to learn guitar and songwriting after becoming a fan of Taylor Swift. In high school, she was inspired by feelings of unrequited love. In 2020, she graduated from Kenyon College with a major in English.

== Career ==
Blackman began recording music while in high school, releasing two full-length albums, Blue Green in 2016 and Laundry Room Songs in 2017.

In 2020, Blackman began posting clips of herself singing original songs on TikTok. This got the attention of San Francisco-based record label Father/Daughter Records, which signed her to the label in 2021. Upon signing to the label, Blackman released a song titled "Why We Met".

In May 2021, Blackman released a song titled "Souvenir". Blackman released "Seeds" in June 2021. Blackman released "Glitch" in August 2021.

In November 2021, she released the song "Drive", which reflects on her fear of driving and helped her decide to reside in New York City.

On April 8, 2022, Blackman released All of It, her first album with Father/Daughter Records.

== Discography ==
Studio albums

- Blue Green (self-released, 2016)
- Laundry Room Songs (self-released, 2017)
- All of It (Father/Daughter Records, 2022)

Singles

- "Why We Met" (2020)
- "Souvenir" (2021)
- "Seeds" (2021)
- "Glitch" (2021)
- "Drive" (2021)
