= Remember Sports =

American indie rock band

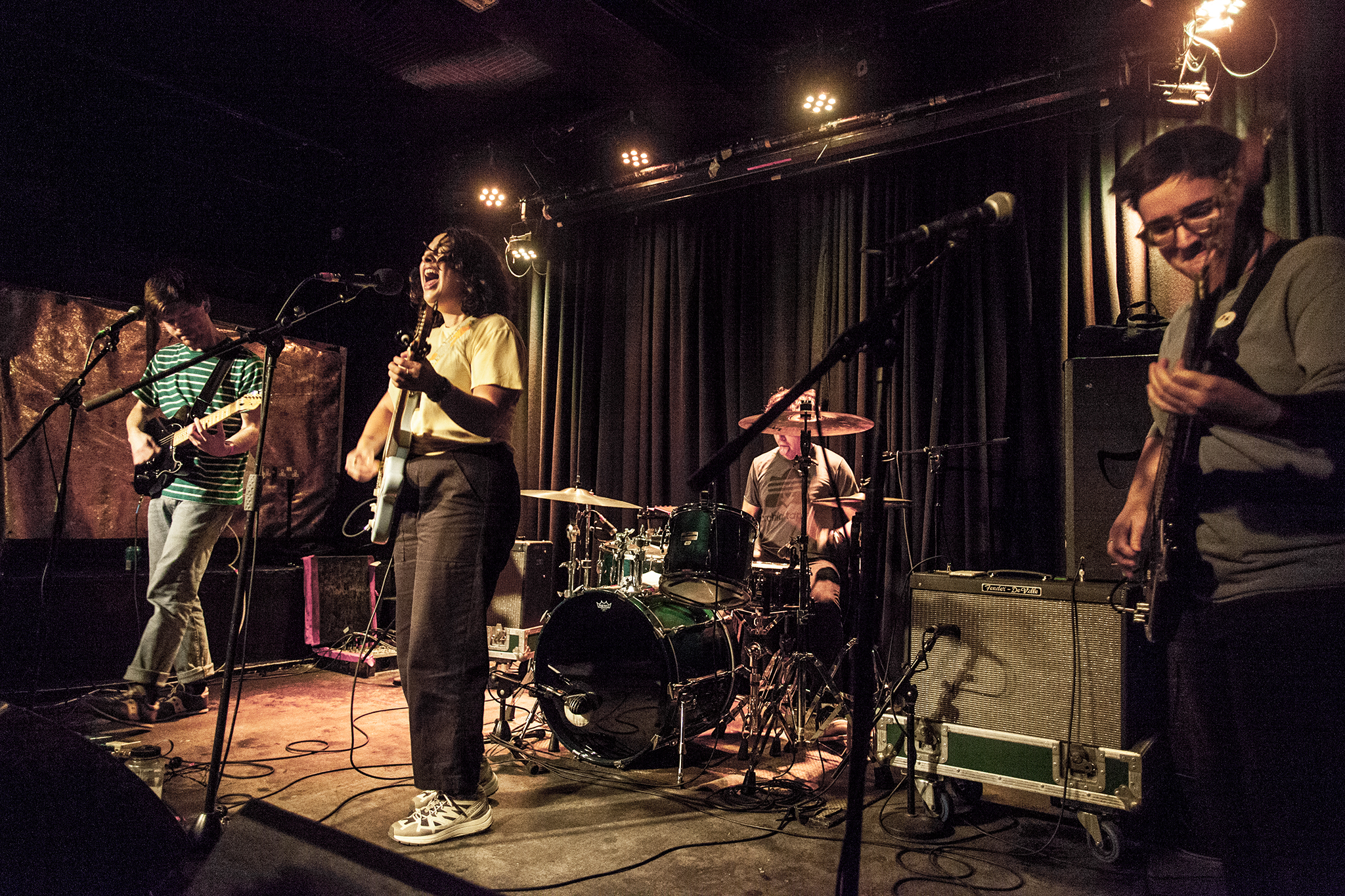
- Remember Sports at The Lexington, London, October 2022

Background information
- Origin: Gambier, Ohio, United States
- Genres: Indie rock
- Years active: 2014–present
- Labels: Father/Daughter Records; Big Scary Monsters; Get Better Records
- Members: Carmen Perry; Catherine Dwyer; Jack Washburn; Julian Fader
- Past members: James Karlin; Connor Perry; Benji Dossetter; Ethan Primason
- Website: www.remembersports.com

Remember Sports is an American indie rock band from Philadelphia, Pennsylvania, United States. Formed in Gambier, Ohio, and originally named Sports, they have released four albums on Father/Daughter Records.

== History ==
Remember Sports formed in 2012 when all members were attending Kenyon College in Gambier, Ohio. They released their first album in 2014 on Bandcamp titled Sunchokes. In 2015, Sports signed to Father/Daughter Records, where they released their second album titled All of Something. The album was produced by Kyle Gilbride (Waxahatchee, Upset, Field Mouse). All of Something was recorded primarily while most of the members were still in college. The album received four stars out of five by Rolling Stone magazine. The album was listed at number ten on PopMatters list titled "The Best Indie Pop of 2015".

In August 2016, Remember Sports released a demo of their song "Makin It Right", which was featured on the Clearmountain Compilation Vol. 1.

In November 2017, the band announced their name change from Sports to Remember Sports to avoid confusion with other bands, including the Oklahoma-based band, Sports. In 2018, the band released their third album titled Slow Buzz. In 2020, the group contributed a cover of the song "Just the Girl" by the Click Five for Saving for a Custom Van, a tribute compilation celebrating the life of musician Adam Schlesinger.

In 2021, the band announced their fourth LP, Like a Stone, released on April 23, 2021. It was named Stereogum's album of the week.

In 2025 the band signed to Get Better Records and announced their fifth album, The Refrigerator, would be released on February 13, 2026.

== Band members ==
Current

- Carmen Perry – vocals, guitar, songwriter
- Catherine Dwyer – vocals, bass
- Jack Washburn – vocals, guitar
- Julian Fader - drums

Former

- Connor Perry – drums
- Benji Dossetter – drums
- James Karlin – bass

== Discography ==
Studio albums

- Sunchokes (2014, self-released)
- All of Something (2015, Father/Daughter)
- Slow Buzz (2018, Father/Daughter)
- Like a Stone (2021, Father/Daughter)
- The Refrigerator (2026, Get Better Records)

EPs

- Leap Day (2022, Father/Daughter)

Live Albums

- Sports (2013, self-released)
- Remember Sports on Audiotree Live (2018, Audiotree Music)
- live @ port (2015, self-released)
