= Thunder Follows the Light =

Studio album by Mutual Benefit
- Released: September 21, 2018
- Length: 39:02
- Label: Transgressive Records

Mutual Benefit chronology
Skip a Sinking Stone (2016)	Thunder Follows the Light (2018)

Professional ratings
Aggregate scores
Source	Rating
Metacritic	76/100
Review scores
Source	Rating
AllMusic	4/5 stars
Clash	7/10
Paste	8.1/10
Pitchfork	6.4/10

Thunder Follows the Light is the third studio album by American indie rock band Mutual Benefit. It was released on September 21, 2018 under Transgressive Records.

== Critical reception ==
Thunder Follows the Light was met with "generally favorable" reviews from critics. At Metacritic, which assigns a weighted average rating out of 100 to reviews from mainstream publications, the album received an average score of 76, based on 7 reviews. Marcy Donelson for AllMusic praised the lyrics and imagery, and said of the album "its woven timbres and rhythms are constructed in a way that would be dazzling if not so subdued". In a review for Clash, Nick Roseblade called the album "[Lee's] strongest and most personal work to date", and said "if you start to dig a bit below its ethereal surface you find something that is incredibly rewarding on repeat listens". Madison Desler for Paste praised the album's political themes and called it, "ambient, folky and gorgeously arranged." A review by Arielle Gordon for Pitchfork took a more critical view, finding the lyricism to "lack potency": "This doe-eyed optimism is easily digestible, and that is perhaps the biggest issue: the realities Lee purports to write about are not easy." Gordon also acknowledged Lee's skill as a composer, but found the instrumentation often too "cloying" to adequately deal with the weighty subject matter.

== Track listing ==
All tracks are written by Mike Clifford, Jake Falby, Jordan Lee, and Dillon Zahner.

No.	Title	Length
1.	"Written in Lightning"	5:17
2.	"New History"	3:12
3.	"Storm Cellar Heart"	2:51
4.	"Shedding Skin"	4:49
5.	"Come to Pass"	2:42
6.	"Waves, Breaking"	5:02
7.	"No Dominion"	2:49
8.	"Mountain's Shadow"	3:17
9.	"Nightingale"	4:18
10.	"Thunder Follows"	4:45

== Personnel ==
Musicians

- Jordan Lee – primary artist
- Lib Bee – vocals
- Gabriel Birnbaum – saxophone
- Mike Clifford – guitar
- Pier Harrison – vocals
- Noah Klein – flute
- Felix Walworth – drums
- Jake Falby – violin

Production

- Josh Bonati – mastering
- Carlos Hernández – engineer
- Brian Deck – engineer
