= Whitney Ballen =

American musician

- Origin: Issaquah, Washington
- Genres: Indie rock
- Occupations: Singer-songwriter; musician
- Instruments: Vocals; guitar
- Years active: 2011–present
- Label: Father/Daughter Records

Whitney Ballen is an American indie rock musician from Issaquah, Washington.

== History ==
In 2008, Ballen acquired a tape recorder and recorded conversations, sounds, and ideas for songs. Ballen attended the University of Washington, graduating in 2013. Ballen released her debut full-length album while still a college student, titled White Feathers, White Linens. The album was released after raising money to record it through Kickstarter. In 2014, Ballen released her first EP titled Falls. Ballen released her second and most recent full-length album, You're a Shooting Star, I'm a Sinking Ship, in 2018 through Father/Daughter Records and Substitute Scene Records. In 2020, Ballen covered Cellophane by FKA Twigs.

== Discography ==
=== Albums ===
- White Feathers, White Linens - Self released (2011)
- Falls - Self released (2014)
- You’re A Shooting Star, I’m A Sinking Ship - Father/Daughter Records (2018)

=== Extended plays ===
- Being Here Is Hard - Good Cheer Records (2017)
