= Pageant (album) =

Studio album by Pwr Bttm
- Released: May 12, 2017
- Genres: Queercore; indie rock; garage rock
- Length: 33:43
- Labels: Polyvinyl; Big Scary Monsters
- Producer: Christopher Daly

Pwr Bttm chronology
Ugly Cherries (2015)	Pageant (2017)

Singles from Pageant
- 1. "Big Beautiful Day" Released: February 14, 2017; 2. "Answer My Text" Released: March 7, 2017; 3. "LOL" Released: April 10, 2017

Pageant is the second and final studio album by American queer punk duo Pwr Bttm. Originally released by Polyvinyl and Big Scary Monsters, the album's release was preceded by sexual abuse allegations against Pwr Bttm member Ben Hopkins. Both labels dropped the band from their rosters and ceased production and distribution of Pageant, providing refunds to those who pre-ordered the record. Pageant was also pulled from music streaming services. The album debuted on the UK Indie Chart on May 19, 2017, at no. 46.

== Critical reception ==
Professional ratings
Aggregate scores
Source	Rating
AnyDecentMusic?	8.1/10
Metacritic	85/100
Review scores
Source	Rating
AllMusic	3.5/5 stars
Consequence of Sound	B+
The Guardian	4/5 stars
NME	4/5 stars
Paste	8.6/10
PopMatters	8/10
Rolling Stone	4/5 stars

On Metacritic, the album holds an average critic score of 85, based on 12 critics, indicating "universal acclaim".

With respect to the allegations of sexual abuse against band member Ben Hopkins, Sasha Geffen of Pitchfork commented on Pageant, saying, "What was a document of queer exuberance has now become a hollow sequence of songs, from a band whose sentiments were maybe always shallow."

== Commercial performance ==
Pageant charted for one week at position 5 on the US Heatseekers Albums chart for the week of June 3, 2017. It also charted for one week at position 31 on the US Independent Albums chart for the week of June 3, 2017. In the UK, the album debuted on the Indie Chart on May 19, 2017 at position 46.

== Track listing ==
Pageant track listing
No.	Title	Length
1.	"Silly"	2:35
2.	"Answer My Text"	2:47
3.	"LOL"	2:47
4.	"Won't"	2:20
5.	"Now Now"	2:22
6.	"Sissy"	2:24
7.	"Pageant"	2:28
8.	"Oh, Boy"	2:47
9.	"New Trick"	2:27
10.	"Wash"	2:45
11.	"Kids' Table"	2:20
12.	"Big Beautiful Day"	2:49
13.	"Styrofoam"	2:52
14.	"Vacation" (Japanese bonus track)	2:07
Total length:		33:43

== Personnel ==
Credits adapted from Pageant album liner notes.

- Cameron West – arrangement, French horn
- Christopher Daly – production, arrangement (7)
- Rami Dahdal – arrangement
- Kiley Lotz – backing vocals
- Adele Stein – cello
- New Paltz BTTMs Choir – choir (5)
- Travis DeJong – engineering
- Isabel Gleicher – flute
- Jamal Ruhe – mastering, guitar
- Chris Hopkins – soprano vocals
- Nicolas Davis – trumpet
- Sarah Haines – viola
- Jennifer Hinkle – bass trombone

== Charts ==
Chart performance for Pageant
Chart (2017)	Peak position
UK Independent Albums (Official Charts)	46
US Heatseekers Albums (Billboard)	5
US Independent Albums (Billboard)	31
