= Infinite Worlds (book) =

Book by Ray Villard

Infinite Worlds: An Illustrated Voyage to Planets Beyond Our Sun
- Author: Ray Villard and Lynette Cook
- Language: English
- Genre: Nonfiction
- Publication date: 2005
- Publication place: United States
- Media type: Print (Hardback & Paperback)

Infinite Worlds: An Illustrated Voyage to Planets Beyond Our Sun is a nonfiction book by Ray Villard and Lynette Cook about extrasolar planets, featuring Lynette Cook's artwork. The book covers topics from the Big Bang, to extrasolar planets (the main focus of the book), and the ultimate fate of the universe.

From the book's description on the back cover:

The newly discovered planets are boggling astronomers' minds with their bizarre characteristics, including an unimagined diversity of sizes and orbits. In Lynette Cook's illustrations - many newly created for this book - we glimpse the landscapes and atmospheres that might adorn these planets. Ray Villard's text describes the state of astronomy today, imagines where it will take us in the coming years, ponders the chances of success for the Search for Extraterrestrial Intelligence (SETI), and explores the survivability of life in the context of an evolving and accelerating universe. Infinite Worlds is a cosmic adventure that brings the drama of creation and the beauty of the universe to anyone who has wondered at the night sky
