= Video Age =

American rock band

- Origin: New Orleans, Louisiana, U.S.
- Genre: Rock
- Years active: 2016–present
- Members: Ross Farbe; Ray Micarelli; Nick Corson; Duncan Troast

Video Age is an American rock band from New Orleans, Louisiana.

== History ==
Ross Farbe and Ray Micarelli had been making music in New Orleans for numerous years, prior to forming the band together. The band formed after their other bands ended. The band released their first album in 2016 titled Living Alone. In 2018, Video Age released their second full-length album titled Pop Therapy, through Inflated Records. In 2020, the band released their third full-length album, Pleasure Line, through Winspear. The album was influenced by David Bowie, Paul McCartney, and Janet Jackson. The album received mixed reviews.

== Band members ==
- Ross Farbe (vocals, guitar)
- Ray Micarelli (drums)
- Nick Corson (bass guitar)
- Duncan Troast (keyboard)

== Discography ==
=== Studio albums ===
- Living Alone (2016)
- Pop Therapy (2018)
- Pleasure Line (2020)
- Away From The Castle (2023)
