= Sir Babygirl =

American pop singer

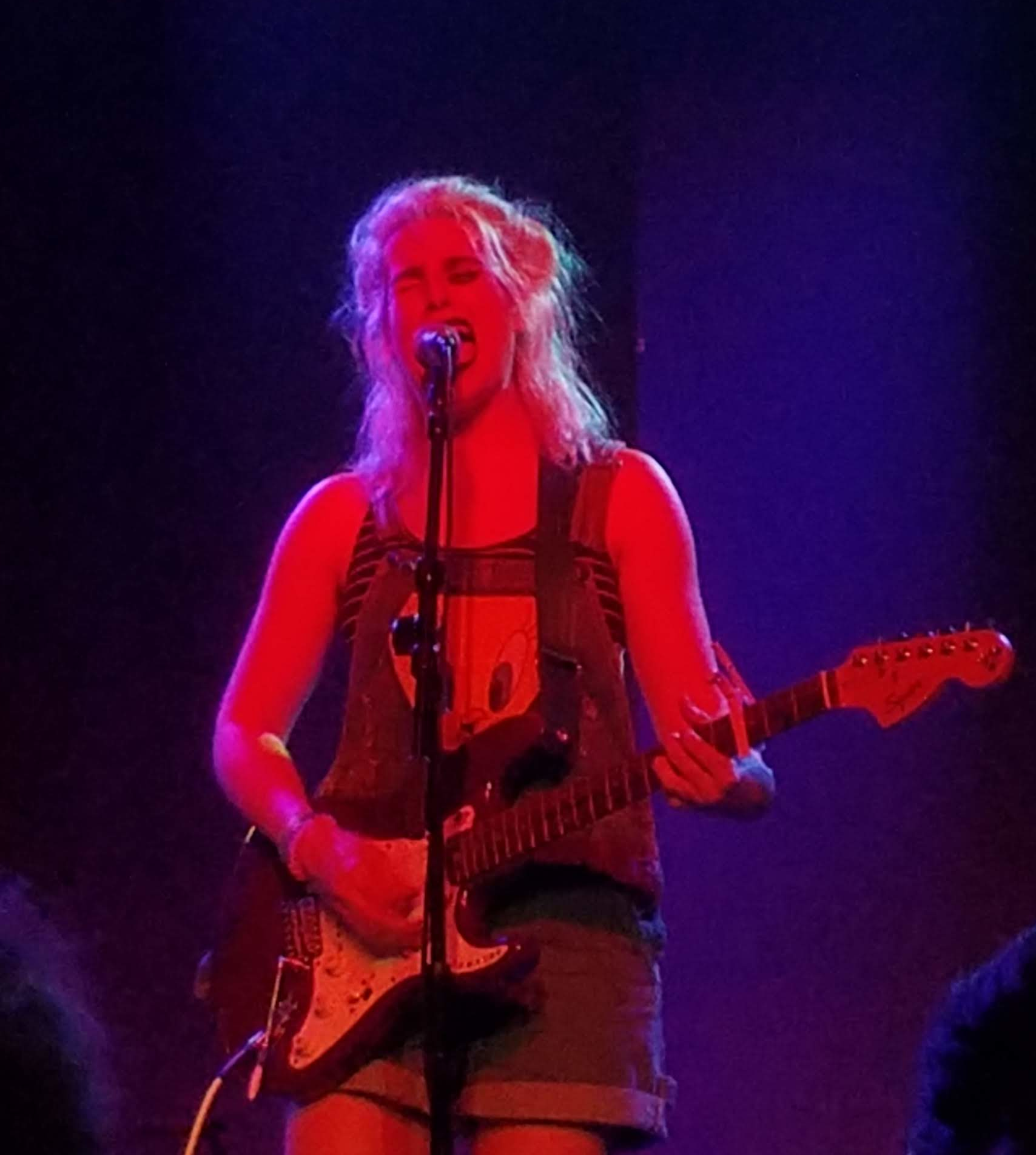
- Sir Babygirl performing in 2019

Background information
- Genres: Indie pop
- Years active: 2019–present
- Labels: Father/Daughter Records

Kelsie Hogue, known professionally as Sir Babygirl, is an American pop singer, songwriter, and performer.

== Life and career ==
Hogue was born in Palo Alto, California, and raised in New Hampshire. Hogue studied drama at Boston University before moving back to New Hampshire, where Hogue played in the Boston hardcore scene and developed the "Sir Babygirl" persona on Instagram. Hogue is non-binary and has stated a specific preference for both she and he pronouns.

Hogue's musical influences include hardcore, pop punk, as well as early-2000s pop artists such as Britney Spears and Christina Aguilera. Hogue is drawn to the excesses and humor of pop music, but as a non-binary and bisexual person, wants to make pop that speaks to the queer experience, stating in Rolling Stone, "I always wanted to blur the lines, and challenge people to see that women and marginalized genders in music can have a fucking sense of humor and be taken seriously."

Hogue's debut album, Crush on Me was released on Father/Daughter records in February 2019. The album was written and produced from Hogue's bedroom studio starting in 2016. Pitchfork gave the album a 6.8 out of 10 rating, describing it as "likely to be among the year’s most extra albums." On November 8, 2019, Hogue released Crush on Me: BICONIC Edition, which is a remastered version of the album.

== Discography ==
=== Albums ===
- Crush on Me (2019)

=== Mixtapes ===
- "Golden Bday: The Mixtape" (2021)

=== Songs ===
- "Heels" (2019)
- "Haunted House" (2019)
- "Flirting with Her" (2019)
- "Pink Lite" (2019)
- "Everyone Is a Bad Friend" (2019)
- "Cheerleader" (2019)
