= Diet Cig =

American indie rock duo

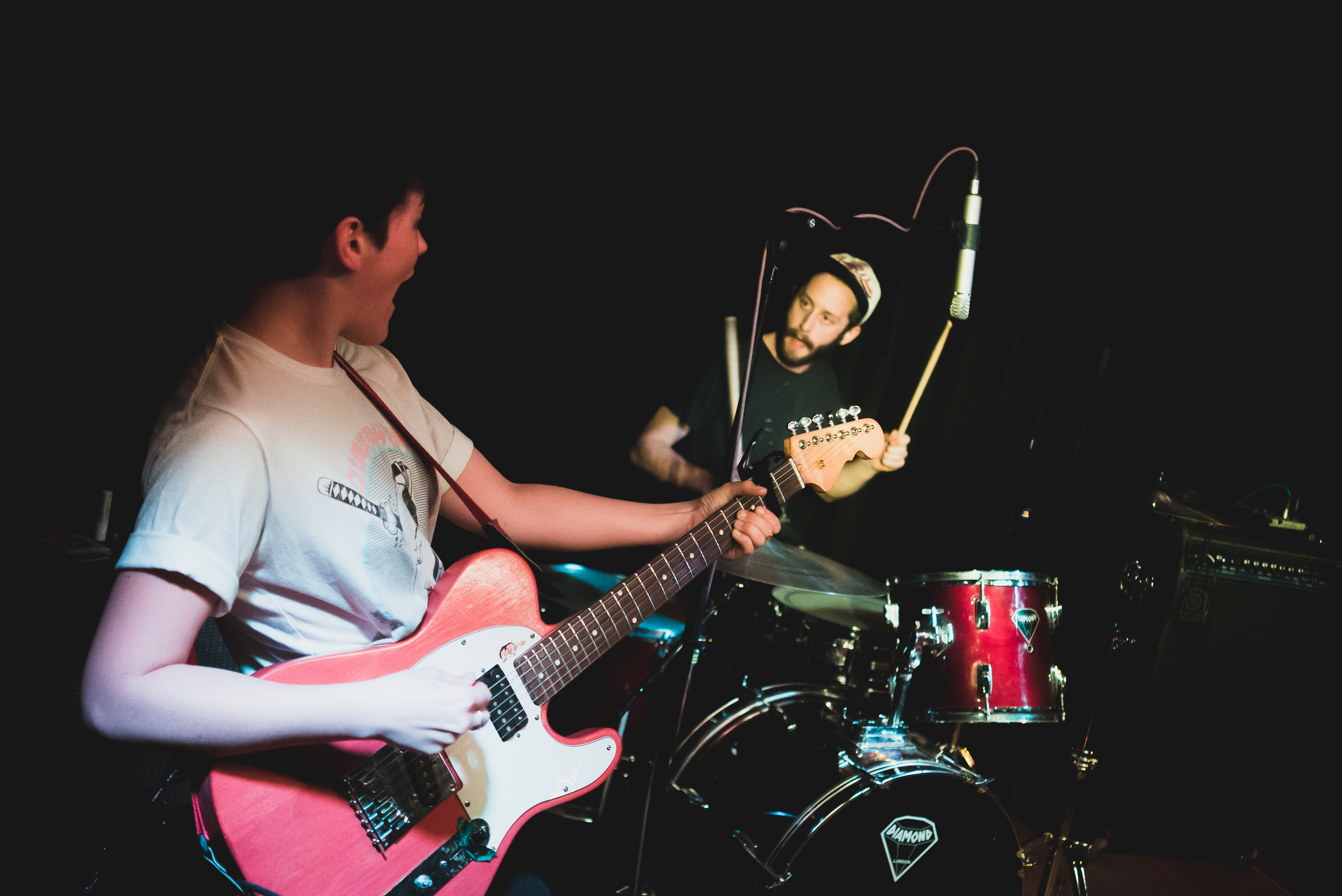
- Diet Cig live in 2016

Background information
- Origin: New Paltz, New York, United States
- Genres: Indie rock, punk rock, pop punk, garage punk, indie pop
- Years active: 2014–present
- Labels: Frenchkiss Records, Father/Daughter Records
- Members: Alex Luciano; Noah Bowman
- Website: dietcig.com

Diet Cig is an American indie rock duo that formed in September 2014 in New Paltz, New York, United States. The band consists of Alex Luciano on guitar/vocals and Noah Bowman on drums. Their first studio album, Swear I'm Good At This, was released in April 2017. Their second studio album, Do You Wonder About Me, was released in May 2020.

Luciano and Bowman met at a house show in New Paltz during the summer of 2014. Bowman's old band, Earl Boykins, was playing at the house show, where Luciano needed a cigarette lighter. She interrupted the band's set to ask Bowman for one, but he gave her a bottle of wine instead. Afterwards, Luciano got his number and told him she'd make a music video for him. The next day, Bowman tattooed a daisy on Luciano's foot and by August 2014, the pair were making music together. Bowman had been in bands since he was 13, but Luciano had never been in a band before and only knew a few chords on the guitar. They officially named their act Diet Cig in September 2014. Luciano and Bowman confirmed in an interview with Pigeons and Planes that the name has no significance.

== History ==
=== Over Easy and Sleep Talk / Dinner Date (2014–2017) ===
The band's first EP, titled Over Easy, was released on February 24, 2015. It was written by Luciano in her bedroom in August 2014, and was recorded over one night on Halloween of that year. The straightforward song lyrics focus on the annoyances of music scenes. The name comes from a breakfast special at The Main St. Bistro in New Paltz, where Luciano and Bowman would go almost every day. The band released its first single, Scene Sick, in January 2015 on the independent record label Father/Daughter Records.

On September 18, 2015, Diet Cig released a 7" single entitled Sleep Talk / Dinner Date. The track Sleep Talk is "a love song told through a what-if scenario", and Dinner Date has been described as "a self-aware ode to fleeting relationships, changing, and growing out of adolescence."

The band performed songs from Over Easy and from their upcoming debut album at the South by Southwest festivals in 2016 and 2017. On Aug. 11, 2017, NPR's released a three-song set Diet Cig performed for Tiny Desk Concerts; on YouTube, the performance has more than 650,000 views.

=== Swear I'm Good At This (2017–18) ===
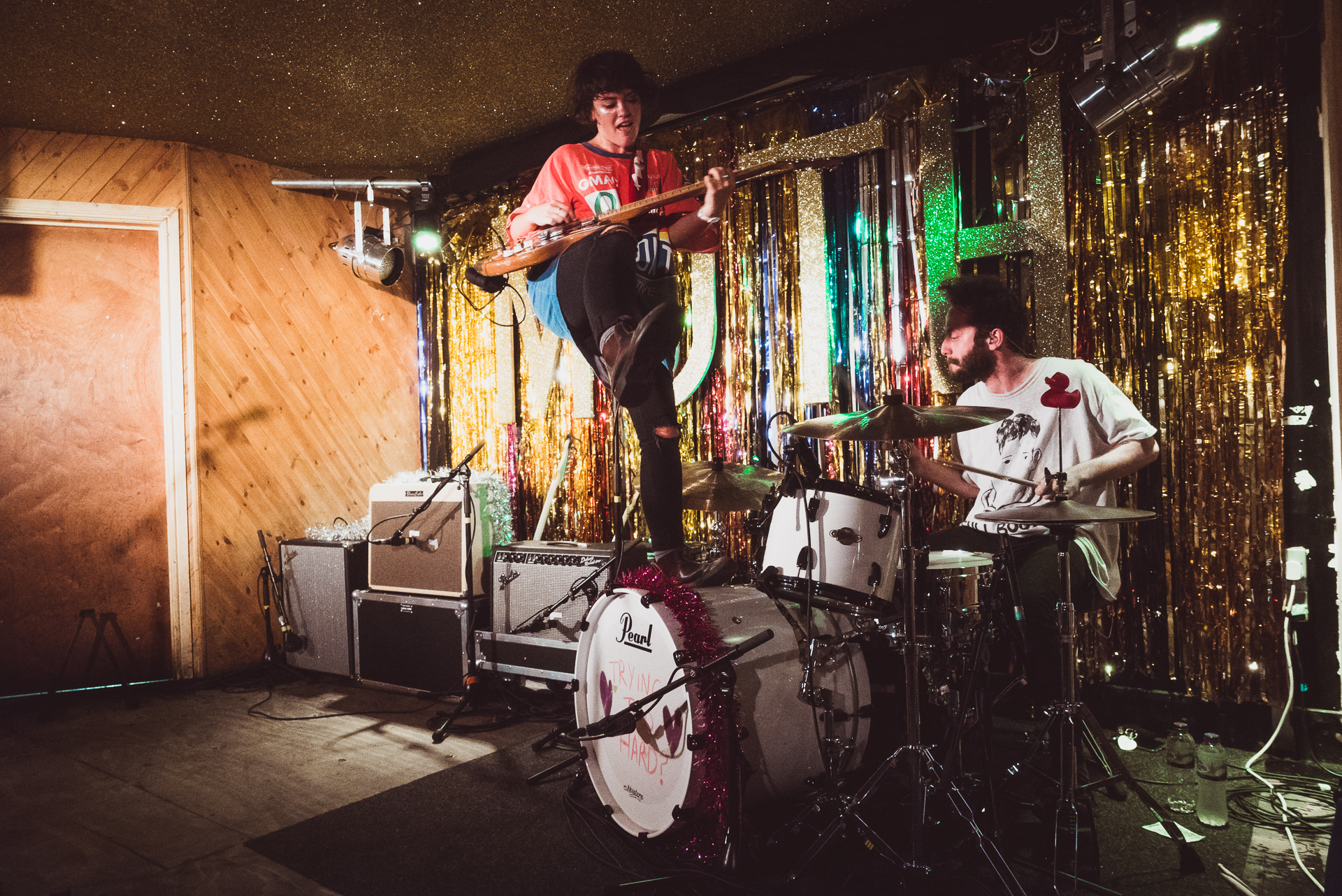
Diet Cig performing in Hackney in October 2017

Diet Cig released their debut album, Swear I’m Good At This, on April 7, 2017, via Frenchkiss Records. Spanning 12 tracks, the album was recorded at Salvation Recording Co. in their hometown of New Paltz as well Atomic Sound in New York City. According to a press release, the debut LP sees Diet Cig railing against people who've dismissed their opinions and judged them unfairly simply because they didn't quite live up to a societal norm or expectation. The band finished recording Swear I'm Good At This on Halloween 2016, exactly two years after they finished recording Over Easy.

The album's lead single is titled “Tummy Ache”. The band notes: “It's all about unpacking the feeling of approaching punk with radical softness, and the struggle when it’s not always read as powerful or cool or whatever enough [...] it’s the shout into my pillow when what I’m saying isn’t being heard, and a big old I FEEL YA to all the femme folks creating space for themselves in a world that wants to keep us quiet.”

The band performed at the Audiotree music festival in Kalamazoo, Michigan in 2018.

=== Do You Wonder About Me? and Spring Tour (2020–present) ===
On January 27, 2020, Diet Cig released their first single in three years, titled Night Terrors. Luciano stated that the song "centres around my very real and frequent experiences with night terrors and other bizarre sleep activity." They also announced a tour of the UK, USA, and Canada beginning in May 2020. March 3, 2020, the band released another single, titled Thriving. Their second studio album, titled Do You Wonder About Me?, was released on May 1, 2020. The album was produced by Christopher Daly, and engineered by Kyle Pulley and Joe Reinhart at Headroom Studios, in Philadelphia Pennsylvania.

The band contributed a cover of the Metallica song "The Unforgiven" to the charity tribute album The Metallica Blacklist, released in September 2021.

The band also contributed to a song titled Siobhan's Waltz For Revenge, an original song written for Arin Hansen's book "Ghost Hunter Adventure Club And The Express Train To Nowhere" written under the pseudonym "Dr. Cecil H.H. Mills". The song was uploaded to the Game Grumps YouTube channel on the 13th of May 2022.

== Members ==
Alex Luciano grew up in Berne, New York, and attended SUNY New Paltz. Her younger brother and sister are featured on the front and back of the band's single Sleep Talk / Dinner Date. Before Diet Cig, she had never picked up an electric guitar or played in a band.

Noah Bowman was born in Brooklyn, New York, and moved upstate to Kerhonkson, New York, when he was 9. He has been playing in different bands since he was 13 years old, taking part in numerous projects, including Just Kids and Earl Boykins. He has a twin brother named Dakota who is a sound engineer in Brooklyn.

== Discography ==
=== Studio albums ===
- Swear I'm Good At This (2017)
- Do You Wonder About Me? (2020)

=== EPs ===
- Over Easy (2015)
- Don't Like Driving Like I Used To (2021)

=== Singles ===
- Sleep Talk / Dinner Date (2015)
- Night Terrors (2020)
- Thriving (2020)
- The Unforgiven (2021)
