= Mutual Benefit (band) =

American musician

- Born: Jordan Lee
- Genres: Indie rock; indie folk; baroque pop; lo-fi
- Years active: 2009–present
- Labels: Other Music Recording Co; Mom + Pop; Father/Daughter; Soft Eyes; Kassette Klub
- Website: www.mutualbenef.it

Mutual Benefit is a music project created by singer-songwriter Jordan Lee. The band consists of various musicians gathered by Jordan Lee, and has no concrete band line-up.

The band's first studio LP Love's Crushing Diamond has gained critical praise; being named Stereogum's Band to Watch, and Pitchfork's best new music. Contributions to Love's Crushing Diamond were made by musicians Jake Falby (violins), George Folickman (bass), Marc Merza (electric guitar), Virginia de la Pozas (voice), Cory Siegler (voice), Julie Byrne (voice), Cameron Potter (drums), and Dillon Zahner (hand drums + percussion).

== History ==
Mutual Benefit was first created as a musical project by Jordan Lee while he was living in Austin, Texas. Lee then moved to Boston in order to meet up with some musicians he wanted to play with. The band consisted of fluid band members, and the band's line-ups on tours were based on which musicians were available at the time. While touring on the road in late 2011, Lee began recording for the album Love's Crushing Diamond. Lyrics and musical composition for the album were written while Lee was living in St. Louis, but the recording began at the Ohm Recording Studio in Austin, Texas. The album was finished in Boston and released on October 7, 2013. The album became the first Bandcamp release to be named "Best New Music" by Pitchfork.

In 2016, Mutual Benefit released their second full-length album, "Skip a Sinking Stone," under the Mom + Pop Music label. The album was recorded over a span of two years and featured contributions from a range of musicians, including collaborators from the Boston and New York music scenes. "Skip a Sinking Stone" received critical acclaim for its introspective lyrics and intricate arrangements.

Mutual Benefit has toured extensively, both in the United States and internationally. Their live performances are known for their intimate, heartfelt nature, often featuring a mix of acoustic and electronic elements. Despite the ever-changing lineup, Lee's consistent artistic vision has ensured a cohesive sound and emotional depth in all of Mutual Benefit's projects.

In recent years, Mutual Benefit has continued to release new music and engage with their fanbase through various online platforms. The project's ability to adapt and evolve while maintaining its core aesthetic has cemented Mutual Benefit's place in the indie music landscape. They released "Growing at the Edges" in 2023.

== Discography ==
=== Digital albums ===
- Figure in Black (2009)
- Drifting EP (2010)
- Spider Heaven (2010)
- Mutual Spirits (2011)
- I saw the sea (2011)
- The Cowboy's Prayer (2011)

=== LP records ===
- Love's Crushing Diamond (2013)
- Skip a Sinking Stone (2016)
- Thunder Follows The Light (2018)
- Growing at the Edges (2023)
