= Esther Rose (musician) =

American country musician

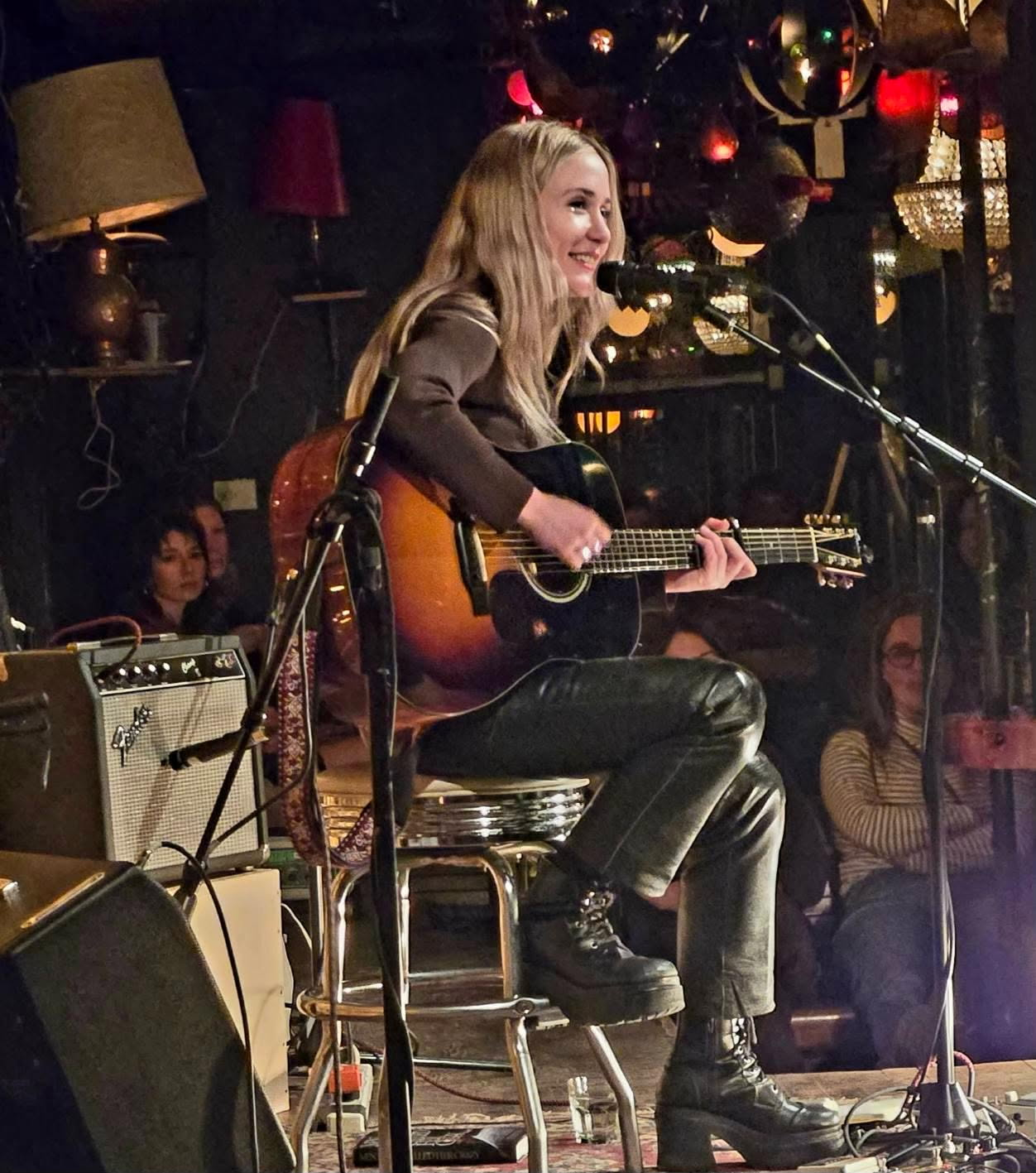

Background information
- Origin: New Orleans, Louisiana, U.S.
- Years active: 2013–present
- Labels: Father/Daughter Records, New West Records
- Website: www.estherrose.net

Esther Rose is an American country musician based in New Orleans, Louisiana.

== Career ==
Esther Rose began her career collaborating with musician Luke Winslow-King. In 2017, Rose released her debut album titled This Time Last Night. In 2019, Rose signed to Father/Daughter Records and released her second album titled You Made It This Far. On March 26, 2021, Rose released her third album How Many Times. Rose's fourth album, Safe to Run, was released on April 21, 2023, via New West Records. She released her fifth album, Want, on May 2, 2025.

== Discography ==
=== Studio albums ===
- This Time Last Night (2017)
- You Made It This Far (2019)
- How Many Times (2021)
- Safe To Run (2023)
- Want (2025)
