= Vagabon =

American singer-songwriter (born 1992)

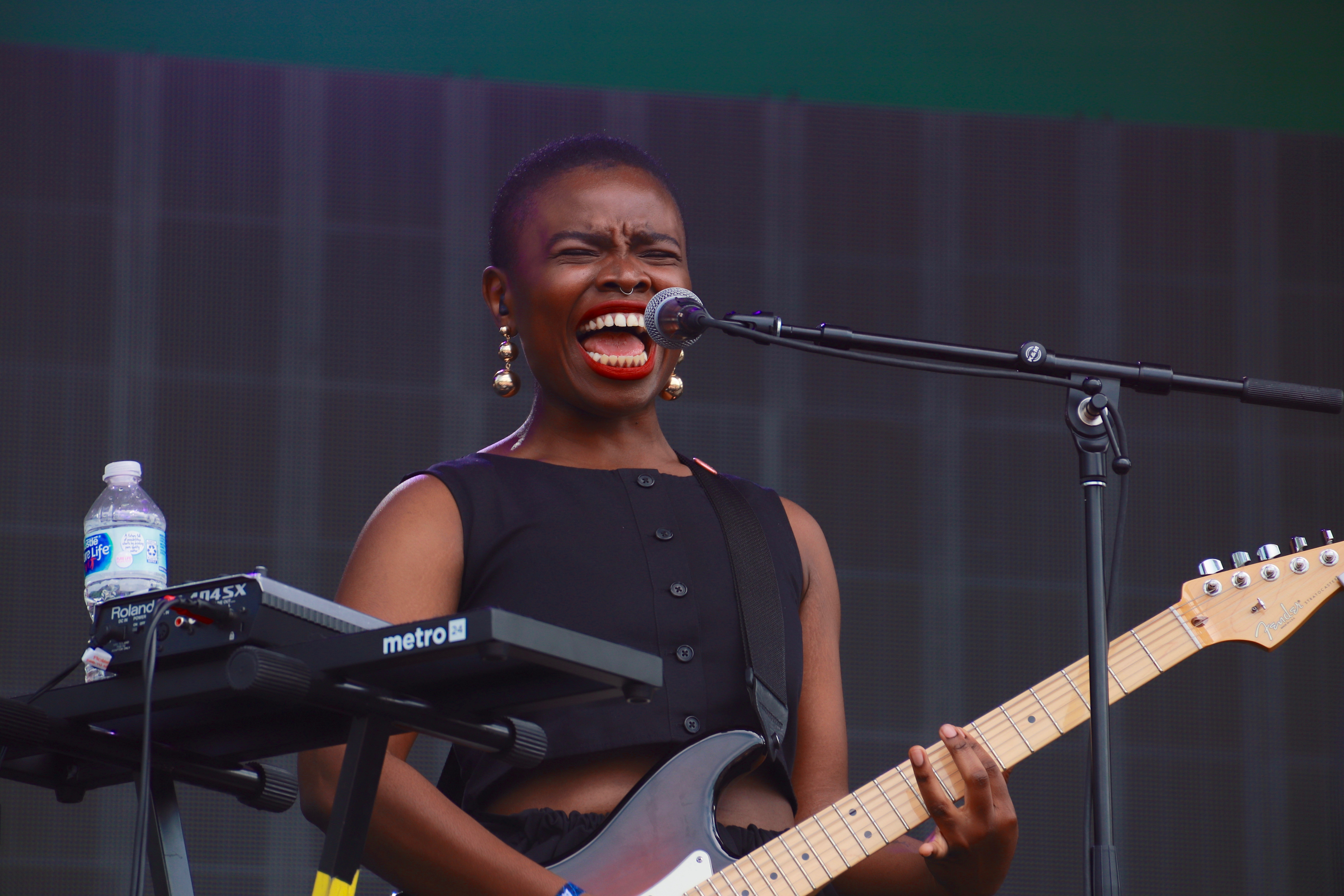
- Vagabon performing in 2017

Background information
- Born: Laetitia Tamko; October 25, 1992 (age 34); Yaoundé, Cameroon
- Genres: Indie rock; electro-pop
- Occupations: Singer-songwriter; musician
- Instruments: Vocals; guitar; drums; synths; bass; samples
- Years active: 2014–present
- Labels: Miscreant; Father/Daughter; Marathon Artists; Nonesuch
- Website: vagabonvagabon.com

Laetitia Tamko (born October 25, 1992), better known by her stage name Vagabon, is a Cameroonian-American self-taught multi-instrumentalist, singer-songwriter and music producer based in New York City.

== Biography ==
=== Early life ===
Laetitia Tamko was born in Yaoundé, Cameroon. At age 13 her family relocated to New York so her mother could attend law school. Having come from a French-speaking country, Tamko learned to speak English and was soon able to attend Westchester High School. Tamko later attended City College of New York and graduated from the Grove School of Engineering in 2015.

=== Career ===
At age 17, Tamko's parents bought her a Fender acoustic guitar from Costco. She taught herself to play by watching instructional DVDs. In 2014 she started uploading her music to Bandcamp under the pseudonym Vagabon. In addition to vocals and guitar, Tamko played drums, keyboard, and synth on her 2017 album Infinite Worlds. In 2018 she was invited to open for Courtney Barnett on her North American summer tour.

Initially, Tamko had been working on a follow-up project to Infinite Worlds in 2018. However, she scrapped it entirely to prioritize a genre-fluid approach to her next album. Her self-titled second album (Nonesuch, 2019) is self-produced and explores new sounds. It features digital sounds and synth strings alongside her delicate acoustic guitar. Most of the songs are written and played by the artist herself. "We reserve the right to be full when we’re on our own", she sings on her song "Every Woman". Released as a single and official video which can be seen on her website, the song is a young feminist's manifesto. The album also represents a move beyond the indie-rock scene, the shift in sound a "rejection of being pigeonholed."

Vagabon was part of the Newport Folk Festival in July 2021.

In 2023, Vagabon's cover of "If I Loved You" appeared in the film, Red, White, & Royal Blue.

== Discography ==
=== Studio albums ===
- Infinite Worlds (Father/Daughter Records, 2017)
- Vagabon (Nonesuch, 2019)
- Sorry I Haven't Called (Nonesuch, 2023)

=== EPs ===
- Persian Garden (EP) (Miscreant, 2014)
- Vagabon on Audiotree Live (Audiotree Music, 2017)
