= Father/Daughter Records =

Independent record label based in San Francisco

- Founded: 2010; 16 years ago
- Founder: Jessi Frick; Ken Hector
- Distributors: Secretly Distribution, Polyvinyl Records
- Genre: Indie rock
- Country of origin: U.S.
- Location: San Francisco, California
- Official website: fatherdaughterrecords.com

Father/Daughter Records is an independent record label based in San Francisco, California. It is owned and operated by Jessi Frick, a former marketing and publicity executive at Fiddler Records, and her father Ken Hector, and was formed in 2010. It was initially known for releasing early records by Mutual Benefit, Pure Bathing Culture, Levek and Oregon Bike Trails (now known as Cayucas).

The label has released songs by artists such as Shamir, Diet Cig, Remember Sports, Vagabon, Anjimile, Annie Blackman, and Partner. In 2018, Father/Daughter released its first book, Little Wonder by Kat Gardiner.

Stereogum named Father/Daughter Records one of the 6 Breakout Indie Labels of 2014.

In 2022, Father/Daughter Records partnered with Polyvinyl Records, who bought an equity stake in the label. Father/Daughter retained control over all creative decisions with Polyvinyl now handling direct-to-customer fulfillment, though worldwide distribution is still via Secretly Distribution.

== Discography ==
The following are the albums released by the label:

- FD-001 – Family Trees – Dream Talkin 7”
- FD-002 – tooth ache – Skin 7”
- FD-003 – Levek – Look on the Bright Side 7”
- FD-004 – Mutual Benefit & Holy Spirits – Mutual Spirits split 12”
- FD-005 – Oregon Bike Trails aka Cayucas – High School Lover 7”
- FD-006 – Pure Bathing Culture – Pure Bathing Culture 12” EP
- FD-007 – Leapling – Losing Face 10” EP
- FD-008 – Cocktails – Cocktails 7” EP
- FD-009 – Saskatchewan – Occasion
- FD-010 – The Everywheres – The Everywheres
- FD-011 – Bent Shapes – Feels Weird
- FD-012 – Body Parts – Fire Dream
- FDD-001 – Running In The Fog – Silver EP
- FDD-002 – Happy Diving – Happy Diving EP
- FD-013 – Flagland – Love Hard
- FD-014 – Various Artists – Faux Real 12” LP (RECORD STORE DAY)
- FD-015 – Happy Diving – Happy Diving EP
- FD-016 – Andy Sadoway – Str8 Sh00ter EP
- FD-017 – Cocktails – Adult Life
- FD-018 – Small Wonder – Wendy
- FD-019 – Never Young – Master Copy
- FDD-003 – Colours – You Can't See Me
- FDD-004 – Spirit Kid – Is Happening
- FD-020 – Rivergazer – Random Nostalgia
- FD-021 – Sharpless – The One I Wanted To Be
- FD-022 – Happy Diving – Big World
- FD-023 – Never Young – Never Young
- FD-024 – Various Artists – Faux Real II
- FD-025 – Diet Cig – Over Easy
- FD-026 – Anomie – s/t EP
- FD-027 – Pupppy – Shit In The Apple Pie
- FD-028 – Soft Cat – All Energy Will Rise
- FD-029 – Running In The Fog – Silver EP
- FD-030 – O-FACE – Mint
- FD-031 – Diet Cig – Sleep Talk / Dinner Date 7”
- FD-032 – PWR BTTM – Ugly Cherries
- FD-033 – Remember Sports – All of Something
- FD-034 – Hiccup – Hiccup
- FD-035 – Addie Pray – Screentime
- FD-036 – Never Young – NY Singles
- FD-037 – Attic Abasement – Dream News
- FD-038 – Lisa Prank – Adult Teen
- FD-039 – T-Rextasy – Jurassic Punk
- FD-040 – Follin – Follin
- FD-041 – Plush – Please
- FD-042 – Cocktails – Hypochondriac
- FD-044 – Sat. Nite Duets – Air Guitar
- FD-045 – Forth Wanderers – Slop EP
- FD-046 – PWR BTTM – Projection
- FD-047 – PWR BTTM – New Hampshire
- FD-048 – Never Young – Singles Tape II: SoftBank
- FD-049 – Hiccup – Imaginary Enemies
- FD-050 – Loose Tooth – Big Day
- FD-051 – Alex Napping – Mise En Place
- FD-052 – Vagabon – Infinite Worlds
- FD-053 – Remember Sports – Sunchokes
- FD-054 – Nnamdi Ogbonnaya – DROOL
- FD-055 – Diet Cig – Swear I'm Good At This
- FD-056 – Pardoner – Uncontrollable Salvation
- FD-057 – Who Is She? – Seattle Gossip
- FD-058 – Art School Jocks – Art School Jocks
- FD-059 – Fits – All Belief Is Paradise
- FD-060 – Soar – Dark/Gold
- FD-061 – Remember Sports/Pllush – Split 7”
- FD-062 – Nadine – Oh My
- FD-063 – Anna McClellan – Yes and No
- FD-064 – Shamir – Revelations
- FD-065 – Attic Abasement – Dancing is Depressing
- FD-066 – Pllush – Stranger to the Pain
- FD-067 – Pale Kids – Hesitater
- FD-068 – Dama Scout – Dama Scout
- FD-069 – Shamir – Room
- FD-070 – Amy Fleisher Madden – A Million Miles
- FD-071 – Lisa Prank & Seattle's Little Helpers – Gimme What I Want
- FD-072 – Remember Sports – Slow Buzz
- FD-073 – Dama Scout – Milky Milk
- FD-074 – Whitney Ballen – You're A Shooting Star, I'm A Sinking Ship
- FD-075 – Kat Gardiner – Little Wonder
- FD-076 – Sir Babygirl – Crush On Me
- FD-077 – Rose Droll – Your Dog
- FD-078 – Tasha – Alone At Last
- FD-079 – Moaning Lisa – Do You Know Enough?
- FD-080 – Moaning Lisa – Do You Know Enough?
- FD-081 – Partner – Saturday the 14th
- FD-082 – Sir Babygirl – Praying
- FD-083 – Esther Rose – You Made It This Far
- FD-084 – Christelle Bofale – Swim Team
- FD-085 – Lisa Prank – Perfect Love Song
- FD-086 – Remember Sports – Sunchokes (Deluxe Edition)
- FD-087 – Sir Babygirl – Crush on Me: BICONIC Edition
- FD-088 – Christelle Bofale – Miles
- FD-089 – Esther Rose – My Favorite Mistakes
- FD-090 – Anjimile – Giver Taker
- FD-091 – Anna McClellan – I saw first light
- FD-092 – Esther Rose – How Many Times
- FD-093 – Diet Cig – Do You Wonder About Me?
- FD-094 – Tasha – But There's Still The Moon
- FD-095 – Remember Sports – Like a Stone
- FD-098 – Various Artists – Saving for a Custom Van
- FD-099 – Various Artists – Simply Having a Wonderful Compilation
- FD-100 – Tasha – Would You Mind Please Pulling Me Close?
- FD-101 – S. Raekwon – Where I'm at Now
- FD-102dig – Annie Blackman – Why We Met
- FD-102dig2 – Annie Blackman – Souvenir
- FD-102-dig3 – Annie Blackman – Seeds
- FD-103 – Tasha – Tell Me What You Miss The Most
- FD-104 – Anjimile - Reunion
- FD-105 – Esther Rose – How Many More Times
- FD-106 – Anjimile – Reunion (Instrumentals)
- FD-107 – mui zyu – a wonderful thing vomits
- FD-108 – Home Is Where – I Became Birds
- FD-109 – Proper. – The Great American Novel
- FD-110 - mui zyu - a wonderful thing vomits, remixes
- FD-111 - Maria BC - Hyaline
- FD-112 - Home Is Where / Record Setter - dissection lesson
- FD-113 - A.O. Gerber - Meet Me at the Gloaming
- FD-115 - S. Raekwon - I Like It When You Smile
- FD-116 - miu zyu - Rotten Bun for an Eggless Century
- FD-117 - Remember Sports - Leap Day
- FD-118 - Pickle Darling - Laundromat
- FD-120 - Maria BC - Hyaline Remixes
- FD-121 - Who Is She? - Goddess Energy
- FD-122 - Annie Blackman - Bug
- FD-125 - mui zyu - Rotten Bun for an Eggless Century (Expansion Pack)
- FD-126 - Mia June - Don’t Forget Your Bags
- FD-127 - mui zyu - nothing or something to die for
- FD-128 - The Softies - The Bed I Made
- FD-129 - Get Wrong - Get Wrong
- FD-130 - S. Raekwon - Steven
- FD-131 - Anna McClellan - Electric Bouquet
- FD-132 - mui zyu - Rotten Bun for an Eggless Century (Master Rabbit Tape Variations)
- FD-135 - Mia June - Moth Penny Casino/The Way It Is
- FD-136 - mui zyu - nothing or something to die for (Cantonese tasting menu)
- FD-138 - Mia June - Brain Like Computer
