= The Witcher (soundtrack) =

Soundtracks for the television show The Witcher

The music to the American fantasy drama television series The Witcher created by Lauren Schmidt Hissrich for Netflix, based on the book series of the same name (Note: Original title of the book series in Polish: Wiedźmin. Previously the name has had a number of different translations, including Hexer and Witcher, but following the release of the video games the word Witcher was selected as the standard translation of Wiedźmin into English.) written by Polish author Andrzej Sapkowski, featured original score composed by Sonya Belousova and Giona Ostinelli for the first season, while Joseph Trapanese composed the score for the second and third seasons. Both their compositions were released in conjunction with the series' premiere in each season. The first season's score was released on December 20, 2019, followed by the second season's score on December 17, 2021, and the third season's score in two volumes on June 29, and July 27, 2023, respectively.

== Background and development ==
=== Season 1 ===
Sonya Belousova and Giona Ostinelli composed the musical score for the series' first season. They did not reference Sapkowski's book series and were inspired by the story itself, which allowed them endless creative possibilities. They were involved even before the start of the production, thus providing a roadmap to structure the thematic material and also writing musical numbers which he cited as one of the reasons for their earliest involvement. They collaborated with writers Jenny Klein, Declan De Barra, and Haily Hall, for which they performed all the vocals to cover Jaskier's parts. The team wrote around 5–7 versions for each songs ranging from medieval to contemporary to find the right approach and almost wrote over an hour of music before they began scoring to picture. Afterwards, they closely collaborated with Joey Batey, who played Jaskier in the show and vocal coached him. After the editor assembled the cut, they started scoring to picture where hours of new music had to be written and dance performances were more concise in order to follow the pace and editing. The songs that were approved at the demo had to be recorded and finalized, which considered at an elaborative process that required their involvement for most of the year.

The duo wrote and recorded the score at the same time, beginning with a hurdy-gurdy on the first day of recording. As being a "soloistic and virtuosic" score, they could not mock-up the recording, which led to their simultaneous working on the score. Throughout a year, they wrote several songs, folk tunes, dance numbers and score over 8 hours and collaborated with several soloists and artists for the recording. For the score, they had used over 60 new instruments, including some hand-crafted specifically for the score. Due to the vast and diverse universe of The Witcher, they needed a proper representation in terms of music.

The original song "Toss a Coin to Your Witcher", composed by Belousova and Ostinelli and sung by Batey in the second episode, became a viral hit shortly after the series's release. Users have created mods to patch the song into the video game adaptions of The Witcher.

==== Instrumentation ====
The list of instruments, they used on the soundtrack were: hurdy-gurdy, violin, oboe, duduk, lute, renaissance mandolin, baroque guitars, theorbo, psaltery, dulcimers, harmoniums, harp, ethnic woodwinds—cane flutes, penny whistles, recorders, Native American flutes, bansuri—shruti box, tagelharpa, erhu, toy pianos, jaw harp, rainstick, berimbau, contrabass, a wide range of drums and orchestral and ethnic percussions—gongs, frame drums, bodhrans, djembe, talking drums, orchestral toms, snare. They also used a metallic trash can for the score as well. Many of them created specifically for the series, and developed all over the world, including a custom-made berimbau, a hurdy-gurdy which were predominant throughout the score. For the ball sequence, they created an ensemble featuring hurdy-gurdy, shawm, recorders, lute, baroque guitar, mandolin, theorbo, psaltery and medieval percussions and drums. They also went through a contemporary approach in the third episode, where the hurdy-gurdy has been mocked up with effects and distortions for the battle and transformation sequence.

==== Soloists ====
The duo also worked with violin virtuoso Lindsay Deutsch performing the violin and fiddle solos, Declan de Barra who performed three songs—"The Song of The White Wolf" (season finale), "The Last Rose of Cintra" (episode five) and "The End's Beginning" (episode one)—and additional vocals, Rodion Belousov performing oboe and duduk solos, Arngeir Hauksson who played the lute, renaissance mandolin, 4-course guitar, 5-course guitar, theorbo and other medieval plucked strings instruments, flautist Burak Besir performing virtuosic flute and whistle solos, as well as Joey Batey performing—"Toss a Coin to Your Witcher" and "You Think You're Safe" (episode two), "Her Sweet Kiss" (episode six), "The Fishmonger's Daughter" (episode four).

==== Recording times ====
Belousova and Ostinelli recorded eight hours of music, one hour per episode. While the recording of the first two episodes took them 3–4 weeks, the later episodes had them recording approximately two weeks of time, and despite their tight schedule, they also performed an hour of live recording of the score per episode. The first two episodes that them wrote, record, mix and produce an hour thematic music, as well as arranging, producing, recording, mixing and mastering seven songs.

=== Season 2 ===
In October 2021, it was confirmed that Joseph Trapanese would be scoring the soundtrack for the second season. Trapanese, having previously collaborated with Netflix as the composer for Shadow & Bone, replaced Belousova and Ostinelli. Showrunner Lauren Schmidt Hissrich also revealed that new songs performed by Batey would be featured on the soundtrack. Due to the COVID-19 pandemic restrictions, recording a real orchestra for the series being a challenge. Instead of creating mock-ups, effects and samples through Spitfire Audio and Orchestral Tools, Trapanese stuck to the use of human elements, as the notes connect in a way which cannot be replicated through technologies. He then worked with the Sofia Symphony Orchestra at in Sofia, Bulgaria, and conducted the score remotely.

Trapanese used brass, strings and orchestra along with electronics. To make the score sound clear and do justice to the epic setting, Trapanese bought new speakers from the JBL—the same company, which he bought the JBL 6332 model a decade ago. The new speakers accompanied to the small screen setup but also have clarity in the audio quality.

=== Season 3 ===
In June 2022, it was confirmed that Trapanese would return to score the soundtrack for the third season. Joey Batey performed original songs "Extraordinary Things", "Enchanted Flowers" and "The Ride of the Witcher", while Freya Allan who plays Ciri recorded her first track for the series called "A Little Sacrifice" which is inspired by a short story of the same name from The Sword of Destiny, shared between Ciri and Jaskier in the series.

Many tracks feature the Polish folk metal band Percival Schuttenbach who previously worked on the soundtrack for The Witcher 3: Wild Hunt.

=== Season 4 ===
In August 2025, it was confirmed that Trapanese would return to score the soundtrack for the fourth season. It was later announced that Max Davidoff-Grey would be collaborating with Trapanese for the soundtrack. The score also features an original song written for the series, "Shadows of Night" by Half Moon Run.

== Reception ==
Erik Kain of Forbes called it "a very intense and beautiful soundtrack from co-composers Sonya Belousova and Giona Ostinelli that has an almost wild, discordant feel to it at times". Niv M. Sultan of Slant Magazine wrote "The show's energetic battle scenes, set to a stirring score by composers Sonya Belousova and Giona Ostinelli, create the impression that the burly, snow-caked background actors of Game of Thrones were moving at three-quarters speed." For the second season, Hilary Remley of Collider wrote Trapanese "sets the tone for the second season with this powerful and ominous score."

== Track listing ==
=== Season 1 ===
The Witcher (Music from the Netflix Original Series)

Soundtrack album by Sonya Belousova and Giona Ostinelli
- Released: December 20, 2019
- Genre: Soundtrack
- Length: 182:52
- Label: Sony Music

The Witcher (Music from the Netflix Original Series)
No.	Title	Length
1.	"Geralt of Rivia"	1:52
2.	"Toss a Coin to Your Witcher" (feat. Joey Batey)	3:10
3.	"Happy Childhoods Make For Dull Company" (feat. Rodion Belousov)	3:16
4.	"The Time of Axe and Sword Is Now" (feat. Declan de Barra, Lindsay Deutsch)	4:56
5.	"They're Alive" (feat. Lindsay Deutsch, Burak Besir)	1:41
6.	"Tomorrow I'll Leave Blaviken For Good"	1:33
7.	"Her Sweet Kiss" (feat. Joey Batey)	2:00
8.	"It's an Ultimatum"	3:54
9.	"Round of Applause" (feat. Rodion Belousov)	1:09
10.	"Marilka That's My Name"	2:47
11.	"I'm Helping the Idiot" (feat. Arngeir Hauksson)	2:44
12.	"The Knight Who Was Taught to Save Dragons" (feat. Rodion Belousov)	5:05
13.	"Ragamuffin"	4:28
14.	"The Last Rose of Cintra" (feat. Declan de Barra)	2:23
15.	"Late Wee Pups Don't Get to Bark" (feat. Lindsay Deutsch)	2:39
16.	"You Will Rule This Land Someday"	4:31
17.	"The Fishmonger's Daughter" (feat. Joey Batey)	1:16
18.	"Blaviken Inn" (feat. Lindsay Deutsch)	1:34
19.	"Man in Black"	4:04
20.	"The Great Cleansing" (feat. Lindsay Deutsch)	4:04
21.	"The Law of Surprise"	4:30
22.	"Battle of Marnadal"	4:17
23.	"Pretty Ballads Hide Bastard Truths" (feat. Rodion Belousov)	2:19
24.	"Giltine the Artist"	1:42
25.	"Everytime You Leave"	2:07
26.	"Rewriting History" (feat. Rodion Belousov)	3:54
27.	"The End's Beginning" (feat. Declan de Barra)	2:18
28.	"Gold Dragons Are the Rarest" (feat. Rodion Belousov)	5:49
29.	"Bonfire" (feat. Lindsay Deutsch)	2:14
30.	"Children Are Our Favorite"	3:16
31.	"Do You Actually Have What It Takes"	4:52
32.	"Point Me to Temeria"	0:56
33.	"Djinni Djinn Djinn"	2:09
34.	"Here's Your Destiny"	3:48
35.	"Two Vows Here Tonight"	3:02
36.	"Bread, Breasts and Beer" (feat. Lindsay Deutsch)	1:50
37.	"Would You Honor Me With a Dance"	2:03
38.	"Four Marks" (feat. Rodion Belousov)	4:17
39.	"The Pensive Dragon Inn" (feat. Lindsay Deutsch)	1:28
40.	"A Gift for the Princess"	2:48
41.	"You're in Brokilon Forest"	2:41
42.	"Today Isn't Your Day Is It"	1:38
43.	"Lovely Rendez-vous à la montagne"	2:39
44.	"Blame Destiny"	4:44
45.	"The White Flame Has Brought Us Together"	3:35
46.	"He's One of the Clean Ones" (feat. Lindsay Deutsch)	2:24
47.	"You Lost Your Chance to Be Beautiful"	5:13
48.	"Yennefer of Vengerberg"	3:10
49.	"Shouldn't You Know When Someone Is Pretending" (feat. Lindsay Deutsch)	2:21
50.	"You'll Have to Fight It Until Dawn"	9:04
51.	"I'm the One with the Wishes"	7:33
52.	"Chaos Is All Around Us"	4:29
53.	"The Curse of the Black Sun"	6:50
54.	"Battle of Sodden"	4:01
55.	"The Song of the White Wolf" (feat. Declan de Barra)	3:45
Total length:		182:52

=== Season 2 ===
The Witcher: Season 2 (Soundtrack from the Netflix Original Series)

Soundtrack album by Joseph Trapanese
- Released: December 17, 2021
- Genre: Soundtrack
- Length: 101:48
- Label: Maisie Music Publishing

The Witcher: Season 2 (Soundtrack from the Netflix Original Series)
No.	Title	Length
1.	"The Golden One" (feat. Joey Batey)	3:23
2.	"Nilfgaard Attacks"	2:38
3.	"Nivellen"	3:28
4.	"Some Wounds Can't Be Healed"	1:31
5.	"Kaer Morhen"	1:43
6.	"Leshen"	6:10
7.	"Power and Purpose"	4:42
8.	"Aretuza Loses Another"	1:35
9.	"The Pendulum"	2:16
10.	"Witcher Training"	2:11
11.	"Myrapod Chase"	3:12
12.	"Stay With Me"	3:11
13.	"Who Did This to You?"	1:46
14.	"The Key to the Future"	1:44
15.	"Done Dealing in Debts"	4:50
16.	"Burn Butcher Burn" (feat. Joey Batey)	2:39
17.	"Remembering Cintra" (feat. Sonya Belousova, Giona Ostinelli)	4:39
18.	"Elder Blood"	2:43
19.	"Chernobog"	2:14
20.	"Melitele"	4:02
21.	"Fire Fucker"	4:53
22.	"Whoreson Prison Blues" (feat. Joey Batey)	2:07
23.	"Sworn to Protect" (feat. Sonya Belousova, Giona Ostinelli)	4:36
24.	"Elves' Allegiance"	1:34
25.	"I Believe in You"	2:33
26.	"Pain and Desperation"	5:20
27.	"Tell Me What You Want"	3:19
28.	"Basilisks"	6:59
29.	"We're Your Family"	3:01
30.	"You Belong With Us"	1:36
31.	"The Wild Hunt"	2:25
32.	"The White Flame"	2:48
Total length:		101:48

=== Season 3 ===
The Witcher: Season 3 (Soundtrack from the Netflix Original Series)

Soundtrack album by Joseph Trapanese
- Released: June 29, 2023 (Vol. 1); July 27, 2023 (Vol. 2)
- Genre: Soundtrack
- Length: 142:00
- Label: Sony Music Entertainment

The Witcher: Season 3 (Soundtrack from the Netflix Original Series) – Vol. 1
No.	Title	Length
1.	"I Importune You" (feat. Percival Schuttenbach)	1:12
2.	"A Time of Contempt" (feat. Percival Schuttenbach)	5:59
3.	"Shaerrawedd" (feat. Percival Schuttenbach)	3:10
4.	"Shaerrawedd Brawl" (feat. Percival Schuttenbach)	2:08
5.	"Stay Together"	4:22
6.	"A Mission for You"	2:07
7.	"Changing Destiny is a Weighty Business" (feat. Percival Schuttenbach)	3:07
8.	"Extraordinary Things" (feat. Joey Batey)	3:19
9.	"Girl from Cintra" (feat. Sonya Belousova, Giona Ostinelli, Percival Schuttenbach)	3:49
10.	"Vuilpanne" (feat. Percival Schuttenbach)	3:19
11.	"Whispers of a Dozen Bounties"	4:29
12.	"Death Itself"	1:15
13.	"Let Me Guess, You Have a Plan?" (feat. Percival Schuttenbach)	0:31
14.	"He's a Spoon"	1:38
15.	"Emhyr van Emreis"	2:31
16.	"Lessons in Smiling"	1:07
17.	"Aeschna"	1:58
18.	"She Was Gone" (feat. Percival Schuttenbach)	3:01
19.	"You Sure About This?"	3:53
20.	"Alone at Last"	1:35
21.	"All is Not as It Seems" (feat. Percival Schuttenbach, Nathan Armarkwei Laryea, GLOR1A, Josh Weller)	3:40
22.	"War is Brewing"	3:35
23.	"The Melange (A Witcher Tango)" (feat. Percival Schuttenbach)	4:31
24.	"Serious Accusations"	4:01
25.	"Should Have Chosen a Side"	1:38
Total length:		72:00

The Witcher: Season 3 (Soundtrack from the Netflix Original Series) – Vol. 2
No.	Title	Length
1.	"Break the Bind"	2:36
2.	"Gambit" (feat. Percival Schuttenbach)	2:22
3.	"Failure of Judgement" (feat. Percival Schuttenbach)	2:59
4.	"He Always Finds Us" (feat. Percival Schuttenbach)	2:43
5.	"My Daughter"	1:32
6.	"I Thought You Were Dead"	2:06
7.	"Arrogance Will Be Your Undoing"	3:55
8.	"Tor Lara" (feat. Percival Schuttenbach)	1:31
9.	"Korath"	4:16
10.	"A Little Sacrifice" (feat. Freya Allan, Percival Schuttenbach)	2:52
11.	"Little Horse" (feat. Percival Schuttenbach)	1:16
12.	"Water" (feat. Percival Schuttenbach)	2:16
13.	"Dust and Oblivion"	3:28
14.	"You Will Change Everything" (feat. Percival Schuttenbach)	4:14
15.	"Enchanted Flowers" (feat. Joey Batey, Percival Schuttenbach)	3:01
16.	"Brokilon"	2:11
17.	"Skellige"	1:39
18.	"Fine Work"	1:35
19.	"Chaos Has Consequences" (feat. Percival Schuttenbach)	4:47
20.	"Mend What is Broken" (feat. Percival Schuttenbach)	4:52
21.	"Long Live the King"	1:55
22.	"Auspicious Day"	2:15
23.	"Rats" (feat. Percival Schuttenbach)	3:05
24.	"Fair Fight" (feat. Percival Schuttenbach)	3:36
25.	"The Ride of the Witcher" (feat. Joey Batey, Percival Schuttenbach)	3:23
Total length:		70:00

=== Season 4 ===
The Witcher: Season 4 (Soundtrack from the Netflix Original Series)

Soundtrack album by Joseph Trapanese and Max Davidoff-Grey
- Released: October 31, 2025
- Length: 2:26:54
- Label: Netflix Music

All tracks are written by Joseph Trapanese and Max Davidoff-Grey.

No.	Title	Length
1.	"The Witcher"	1:49
2.	"Not the End" (feat. Yaron Cherniak)	2:28
3.	"They Were in Love"	2:12
4.	"Something Is Shifting" (feat. Jason Lazarus)	1:49
5.	"A Good Place to Bed Down"	1:06
6.	"I'm With You"	2:13
7.	"The Hansa" (feat. Percival Schuttenbach and Declan de Barra)	1:19
8.	"Amarillo Heist"	5:57
9.	"Skipping the Pleasantries"	3:06
10.	"Regis"	3:10
11.	"A Life Well Lived"	2:06
12.	"Serve No Master"	2:37
13.	"I Believe in the Blade" (feat. Declan de Barra)	3:27
14.	"Choose the Winning Side"	1:51
15.	"Wraith" (feat. Derek Zeoli and Declan de Barra)	2:18
16.	"Boil My Balls" (feat. Percival Schuttenbach and Yaron Cherniak)	1:31
17.	"This Land Belonged to the Elves" (feat. Clark Rhee)	4:25
18.	"Destroy an Empire" (feat. Ian Gottlieb)	3:43
19.	"Leo, I Have a Job for You"	3:54
20.	"The Witcher Comes With Me"	1:26
21.	"I'm One of You Now"	2:17
22.	"Stay With Me"	1:32
23.	"Greylock"	3:14
24.	"Rage Until the End" (feat. Derek Zeoli and Yaron Cherniak)	2:44
25.	"Surrounded" (feat. Jason Lazarus and Percival Schuttenbach)	3:10
26.	"Yaruga" (feat. Percival Schuttenbach)	1:33
27.	"Zoltan's Forge"	2:25
28.	"Leading Souls to the Afterlife"	1:42
29.	"Campfire Party"	0:33
30.	"As the Screw Turns" (feat. Joey Batey, Nathan Armarkwei Laryea, and Natasha O'Brien)	6:47
31.	"Of Blood and Wine"	3:57
32.	"Duny" (feat. Ian Gottlieb)	5:09
33.	"Hansa Moves Out"	1:47
34.	"Pay the Price"	3:47
35.	"Defending Montecalvo" (feat. Derek Zeoli)	3:48
36.	"Chaos Duel"	2:43
37.	"All of This Darkness"	1:05
38.	"Where the Fuck is My Daughter"	1:04
39.	"I Am a Father"	2:34
40.	"The Truth Cannot Be Exposed"	2:07
41.	"Rusalka"	3:13
42.	"Maria Would Have Liked You"	2:17
43.	"Shadows of Night (Witcher Version)" (by Half Moon Run)	2:58
44.	"Druids"	1:38
45.	"It's All in Motion" (feat. Percival Schuttenbach and Yaron Cherniak)	4:25
46.	"Rebuild Aretuza"	2:15
47.	"Closed for Business" (feat. Clark Rhee and Percival Schuttenbach)	3:50
48.	"Best Way to Become Legends"	1:21
49.	"Let the Music Play"	2:37
50.	"We Meet at Last"	2:15
51.	"A Final Story"	1:29
52.	"Hold the Bridge"	4:58
53.	"Ogre Compensating" (feat. Yaron Cherniak and Percival Schuttenbach)	2:10
54.	"Knighthood" (feat. Declan de Barra)	1:40
55.	"Shadows of Night" (by Half Moon Run)	3:23
Total length:		2:26:54

== Accolades ==
Year	Award	Category	Nominee(s)	Result	Ref.
2021	BMI Film & TV Awards	BMI Streaming Series Award	Sonya Belousova	Won	
2021	Hollywood Music In Media Awards	Best Main Title Theme – TV Show/Limited Series	Sonya Belousova and Giona Ostinelli	Nominated	
2021	Hollywood Music In Media Awards	Best Original Song in a TV Show/Limited Series	Sonya Belousova, Giona Ostinelli, and Jenny Klein	Nominated	
2022	Golden Reel Awards	Outstanding Achievement in Sound Editing – Series 1 Hour – Comedy or Drama – Music	Arabella Winter (for "A Grain of Truth")	Nominated	
