= Salt (Half Moon Run album) =

Studio album by Half Moon Run
- Released: June 2, 2023
- Length: 41:13
- Label: BMG
- Producer: Connor Seidel

Half Moon Run chronology
Inwards & Onwards (2021)	Salt (2023)	Live from the Treehouse (2024)

Singles from Salt
- 1. "You Can Let Go" Released: 3 March 2023; 2. "Alco" Released: 20 April 2023; 3. "Everyone's Moving Out East" Released: 18 May 2023

Salt is the fourth studio album by Canadian rock band Half Moon Run. It was released on June 2, 2023, on BMG. This is the first album not to feature ex-member Issac Symonds since the band's debut in 2012.

== Composition and recording ==
The process of making the album supposedly started with 50 to 60 demos that were sifted through.

Some of the songs were written during the COVID-19 pandemic, but many were also old songs from before and during the Dark Eyes era that had been shelved and reworked. "Alco", "Hotel in Memphis", "9beat", and "Dodge the Rubble" were all said to be over a decade old, with the first 3 being particularly difficult songs to record.

Another difficulty is that the band's best ideas would come about around 10 minutes before curfew during the COVID lockdowns in Montreal, only giving the band a very narrow window to record their ideas.

== Critical reception ==
Clash magazine gave the album an 8/10 saying the album "is like a delicate spring breeze on a morning walk, never invasive but always subconsciously refreshing." Exclaim Magazine said it is an "immaculately sequenced body of work that maintains momentum throughout and pieces together threads from the international journey of their decade-plus career." Also Cool Magazine described it as having an "enchanting, whimsical vibe to it" When The Horn Blows thought it was "beautifully sorrowful and comforting".

Professional ratings
Review scores
Source	Rating
Clash	8/10

== Track listing ==
All tracks are written by Half Moon Run.

No.	Title	Length
1.	"You Can Let Go"	3:06
2.	"Alco"	3:48
3.	"Hotel in Memphis"	3:36
4.	"Everyone's Moving Out East"	4:12
5.	"9beat"	4:06
6.	"Dodge the Rubble"	3:52
7.	"Heartbeat"	3:24
8.	"Gigafire"	3:28
9.	"Goodbye Cali"	4:27
10.	"Salt"	4:01
11.	"Crawl Back In"	3:08
Total length:		41:13

== Personnel ==
Half Moon Run

- Devon Portielje – lead vocals, guitar, piano, percussion
- Conner Molander – backing vocals, guitar, keyboard, piano, pedal steel, bass, harmonica
- Dylan Phillips – backing vocals, drums, piano, keyboard

Additional personnel

- Connor Seidel – engineer, mixing, producer
- Chris Shaw – mixing
- Dylan Phillips – arrangement
- Antoine Gratton – arrangement
- Ryan Morey – mastering
- Camille Paquette-Roy – cello
- The Esca String Quartet – strings
- Jennifer McCord – album photography
- Alex Tomlinson – layout
