= One Piece (2023 soundtrack) =

2023 soundtrack albums by Sonya Belousova and Giona Ostinelli

One Piece (Soundtrack from the Netflix Series)

Soundtrack album by Sonya Belousova and Giona Ostinelli
- Released: September 1, 2023
- Recorded: 2021–2023
- Studio: Abbey Road Studios, London
- Genre: Soundtrack
- Length: 241:15
- Label: Netflix Music
- Producer: Sonya Belousova; Giona Ostinelli

Sonya Belousova and Giona Ostinelli chronology
The Thing About Pam (2022)	One Piece (2023)	Red Sonja (2025)

Singles from One Piece (Soundtrack from the Netflix Series)
- 1. "Wealth Fame Power" Released: August 18, 2023; 2. "My Sails Are Set" Released: August 25, 2023

One Piece (Soundtrack from the Netflix Series) is the soundtrack accompanying the Netflix television series One Piece, a live action adaptation of the manga series of the same name. The soundtrack featured 79 tracks from the score composed by Sonya Belousova and Giona Ostinelli, consisted of a four-hour long runtime underscoring the eight-episode series. It also featured two songs: "My Sails Are Set" and "Bang!", performed respectively by Aurora and Flawless Real Talk. The former, along with the instrumental track "Wealth Fame Power", led the soundtrack as a single release, while the album in entirety was released by Netflix Music on September 1, 2023. The soundtrack featured a diverse range of genres, from rap, hip-hop to orchestral music.

== Background and development ==
Sonya Belousova and Giona Ostinelli were hired to compose the score for the series. After providing music for the first season of the Netflix series The Witcher, the duo wanted the next project to have a musical world building, and when they first heard about the live-action adaptation of the manga series One Piece, they immediately agreed to be onboard for the project. Composition began in late-November and December 2021, where they shot a three-and-half minute video analyzing the pitch and the outline of the concept and the basic sketches of the series' music, where each character had their own distinct instrumentation.

Belousova and Ostinelli recorded the score with 110 musicians at the Abbey Road Studios which included 23 orchestral sessions held for 82 hours and over 3,667 takes. The initial music consisted of 180 cues running for seven hours, and the final existing length consisted of 79 themes running for four hours.

== Composition ==
The first track from the album "Wealth Fame Power" connects Luffy with Gold Roger's legacy. The song has "ascending motion" as Luffy is at the start of his journey so in Roger's scene, they reversed the theme to be in "descending motion" as Rogers is "about to be executed" – "we are ending one storyline, but we are immediately beginning another storyline". She used a hurdy-gurdy for the theme, an instrument which they experimented on The Witcher and virtuoso flamenco guitar played by guitarist Marcin Patrzalek. Additionally, the themes of the other members of the Straw Hat Pirates were blended into Luffy's theme since Luffy serves as the crew's captain.

For Zoro's character, the duo decided on using each instrument representing the sword, with one sword being represented by the bansuri and the other being represented with the beat-box type music that determines the "bursts of breath" and the 42-inch frame drum was used, highlighting as the perfect instrument for Zoro, while the Wado Ichimonji sword which Zoro had a historic connection, is represented by duduk as it had a "mystical and sacred color to it". Sanji's character was represented with a jazzy music, which insisted for a big-band jazz ensemble performing the jazz theme. Usopp's theme was represented with an ukulele in the initial season, establishing his character from the first episode and then grows in sound with the 12-string guitar performing Usopp's theme. Nami's theme features a flute and initially plays "in a very kind of fun, determined, quirky manner" but as the character is explored more in depth over the season, the theme reappears in "different shades". The album's second single "My Sails Are Set", featuring Norwegian singer Aurora, is a lyrical song rendition of Nami's theme; this iteration externalizes Nami's journey and acts as the culmination of the series' musical ideas. On the development of this song, Belousova commented that "usually songs function as needle drops – it's very rare for songs to have actually any sort of musical connection to the rest of the score".

== Track listing ==
No.	Title	Artist(s)	Length
1.	"Wealth Fame Power"		3:44
2.	"My Sails Are Set"	Aurora	2:51
3.	"Wanted Dead or Alive"		5:08
4.	"Zoro vs Mihawk"		3:02
5.	"Let's Disappear"		3:17
6.	"We Are!"		1:58
7.	"Bang!"	Flawless Real Talk	1:20
8.	"Windmill Village"		2:02
9.	"Bink's Brew"		1:04
10.	"Captain Alvida"		3:10
11.	"Good Marines Bad Marines"		1:50
12.	"One Piece Tango"		2:15
13.	"Chop Chop Cannon"		5:28
14.	"The World's Greatest Swordsman or Woman"		2:43
15.	"Wado Ichimonji"		5:25
16.	"I'm Gonna Be King of the Pirates / We Are!"		4:26
17.	"The Grand Line"		2:56
18.	"Gotta Feed the Brain"		2:08
19.	"A Giant Goldfish Monster"		2:15
20.	"I Owe You My Life"		2:55
21.	"Captain of the Dreaded Cook Pirates"		3:08
22.	"Dracule Mihawk"		2:53
23.	"Wounds on the Back Are a Swordsman's Greatest Shame"		6:26
24.	"I Ain't Surrendering"		2:16
25.	"Lord of the Coast"		2:30
26.	"Be Good Luffy"		4:07
27.	"Nami"		2:00
28.	"Every Idiot Dreams of Finding the One Piece"		1:33
29.	"The Imposter, the Pirate Hunter and the Thief"		5:58
30.	"Gum Gum Whip"		1:21
31.	"Smells like Butter, Soy Sauce and Meat"		2:35
32.	"Marines Make the World a Better Place"		3:10
33.	"May I Present Ms Kaya"		3:39
34.	"VIP Entrance Reserved for Special Guests"		1:22
35.	"Kaya & Usopp"		6:47
36.	"The Real Adventures of Captain Usopp"		3:23
37.	"The Stretchy Kind of Monster"		2:21
38.	"Don't You Ever Threaten My Friends"		2:10
39.	"A Hundred Million Berry"		2:35
40.	"Luffy Help Me"		3:08
41.	"Gum Gum Gatling"		4:15
42.	"Training Montage"		1:17
43.	"Roronoa Zoro"		2:42
44.	"Ready to Take Your Beating"		3:22
45.	"Technically I'm Not a Salesman"		1:09
46.	"The Pirates Are Coming"		1:31
47.	"Buggy the Clown"		6:35
48.	"Boogie I'm Warning You"		5:13
49.	"You've Got the Same Dream as Me"		8:06
50.	"Marine with a Bad Haircut vs Tough Guy Three Swords"		2:23
51.	"Why Do They Call Him Axe Anyway"		3:52
52.	"A Massive Piece of Goldfish Poop"		1:47
53.	"Midnight"		3:09
54.	"Gum Gum Bell"		11:33
55.	"The Pirates Are Here"		3:17
56.	"For Honor, for Justice, for the Marines"		1:55
57.	"Not Sailors, We Are Pirates"		2:34
58.	"You Want to Steal a Ship"		0:46
59.	"The Going Merry"		1:44
60.	"You All Must Stay for Dinner"		1:46
61.	"I, Roronoa Zoro, Challenge You to a Duel"		2:29
62.	"Not Everyone Gets to Follow Their Dreams"		2:48
63.	"This Is Our Fight"		1:54
64.	"Belle Mere"		3:54
65.	"Who's Hungry"		2:28
66.	"Then Let the Fighting Begin"		6:44
67.	"Gum Gum Battle Axe"		2:19
68.	"More Rare than Medium"		2:45
69.	"The Kid Reminds Me of Gol D Roger"		1:47
70.	"Captain Nezumi"		1:19
71.	"Kuro & the Black Cat Pirates"		2:50
72.	"My Name Is Cabaji"		1:59
73.	"That Would Be a Waste of Really Good Liquor"		1:43
74.	"Vice Admiral Garp"		1:39
75.	"Gum Gum Rocket"		1:36
76.	"Welcome to Arlong Park"		3:59
77.	"You Better Not Mess with the Straw Hats"		2:29
78.	"I Have My Friends"		2:51
79.	"Goodbye"		1:27
Total length:			241:15

== Mixtape from Baratie ==
One Piece: Mixtape from Baratie

Soundtrack album by Sonya Belousova and Giona Ostinelli
- Released: September 8, 2023
- Recorded: 2021–2023
- Studio: Abbey Road Studios, London
- Genre: Soundtrack
- Length: 15:21
- Label: Netflix Music
- Producer: Sonya Belousova; Giona Ostinelli

Mixtape from Baratie is the second soundtrack to the series, that featured musical themes and instrumentals heard at the pirate restaurant Baratie. Performed by the One Piece Big Band ensemble along with jazz soloists, it was released on September 8, 2023.

=== Track listing ===
No.	Title	Length
1.	"Welcome to Baratie"	1:34
2.	"Something Sweet for Someone Sweet"	1:28
3.	"True Bluefin Saute"	0:51
4.	"Enjoy Your Meals"	0:55
5.	"Drink"	2:03
6.	"They Call It the All Blue"	2:19
7.	"Who the Hell Is Monkey D Luffy"	0:53
8.	"How About a Meal"	1:21
9.	"Get Out of My Restaurant Now"	2:05
10.	"Party at Baratie"	1:52
Total length:		15:21

== Reception ==
Matt Patches of Polygon highlighted that showrunners Matt Owens and Steven Maeda did not give Belousova and Ostinelli "picture-locked episodes" to add underscore to but instead tasked them "with composing a world's worth of sounds that could be in constant conversation depending on which eccentric characters or pirate-y locations were in play at any given moment". Collider's Arezou Amin stated that show's music "strikes a kind of nostalgic, adventuring tone" with the nostalgia due to "how jaunty it is". Kirsten Carey, for The Mary Sue, viewed the score as "fun" but also "highly repetitive". Carey criticized it for playing "over 90% of a given episode" and suggested one could "make a drinking game out of how many times the main theme plays per episode outside of the title".

Matt Owen, for Guitar World, opined that Mihawk's theme was a "quintessential" performance by Marcin Patrzalek as it is "smothered with the classical and flamenco motifs that nod to his early roots, all while upping the ante with behind-the-nut strums, off-the-cuff tuning peg divebombs and (of course) a healthy dose of body knocks for additional percussive flair".

== See also ==
- Music of One Piece
