= Half Moon Run =

Canadian indie rock band

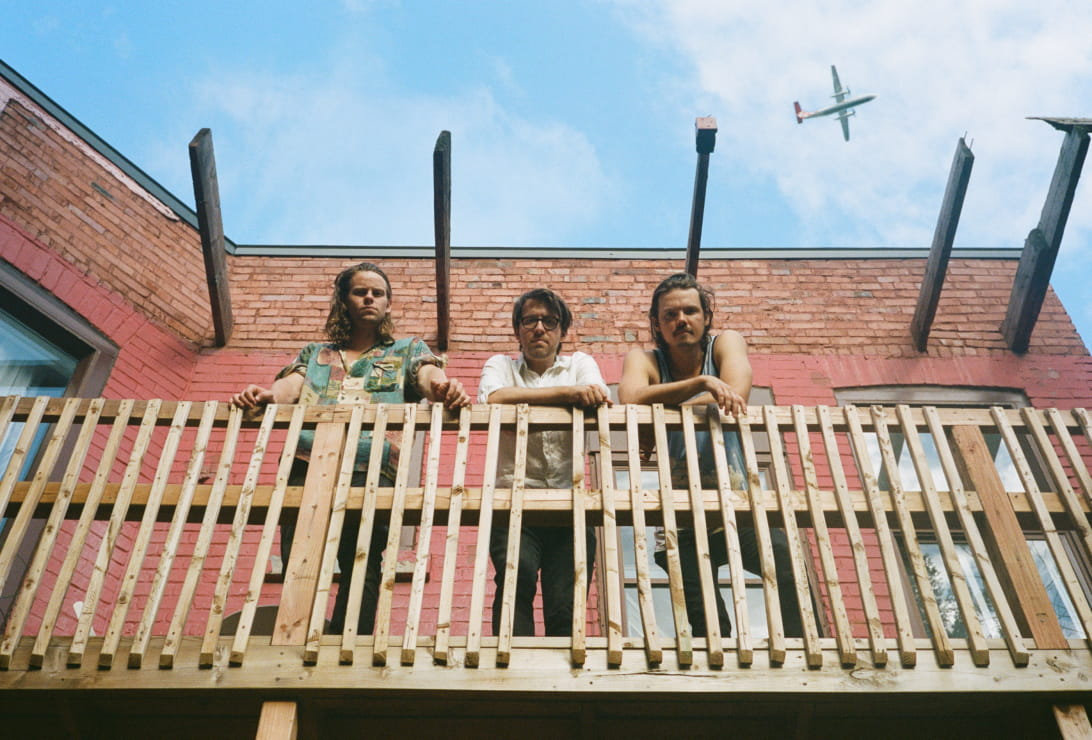
- Half Moon Run in 2021. Left to right: Conner Molander, Dylan Phillips, Devon Portielje

Background information
- Origin: Montreal, Quebec, Canada
- Genres: Indie rock, indie folk, indie pop
- Years active: 2009–present
- Labels: BMG, Indica Records (Canada), Glassnote Records (USA), Communion (UK), Indica Australia (AU and NZ)
- Members: Devon Portielje; Dylan Phillips; Conner Molander
- Past members: Isaac Symonds
- Website: www.halfmoon.run

Half Moon Run is a Canadian indie rock band based in Montreal, Quebec. The group is known for their heavy use of layered percussion, group vocal harmonies, and for playing multiple instruments during live performances.

== Career ==
=== 2009–2013: Formation and Dark Eyes ===
Half Moon Run was formed in 2009 in Montreal's Mile End neighbourhood by Conner Molander and Dylan Phillips, who had both moved to Montreal from Comox, British Columbia. They posted an ad on Craigslist that said they were looking for a bassist and/or a drummer. The ad caught the attention of Devon Portielje, originally from Ottawa. Despite not being a bassist or a drummer, he got in touch with Molander and Phillips who agreed to let him join.

Their debut album, Dark Eyes, was released on 27 March 2012, with "Full Circle" being released on 19 March as the lead single. The entire album was co-produced with Daniel Lagacé and Nygel Asselin. They toured Europe, Australia and North America. Critical acclaim has included praise for their three-part harmonies.

Shortly after the release of Dark Eyes, Isaac Symonds, originally from Comox, joined the lineup.

Throughout 2012 and 2013, the band played at numerous music festivals including South by Southwest, Osheaga, Canadian Music Week, Glastonbury, WayHome Music & Arts Festival, and opened for artists such as Of Monsters and Men, Metric, Patrick Watson, City and Colour, and Mumford & Sons.

In August 2013, "Full Circle" was featured in a trailer for Ubisoft's Assassin's Creed IV: Black Flag. The song "Unofferable" also appears on an episode of the CBS's show Elementary as a backtracking to a scene.

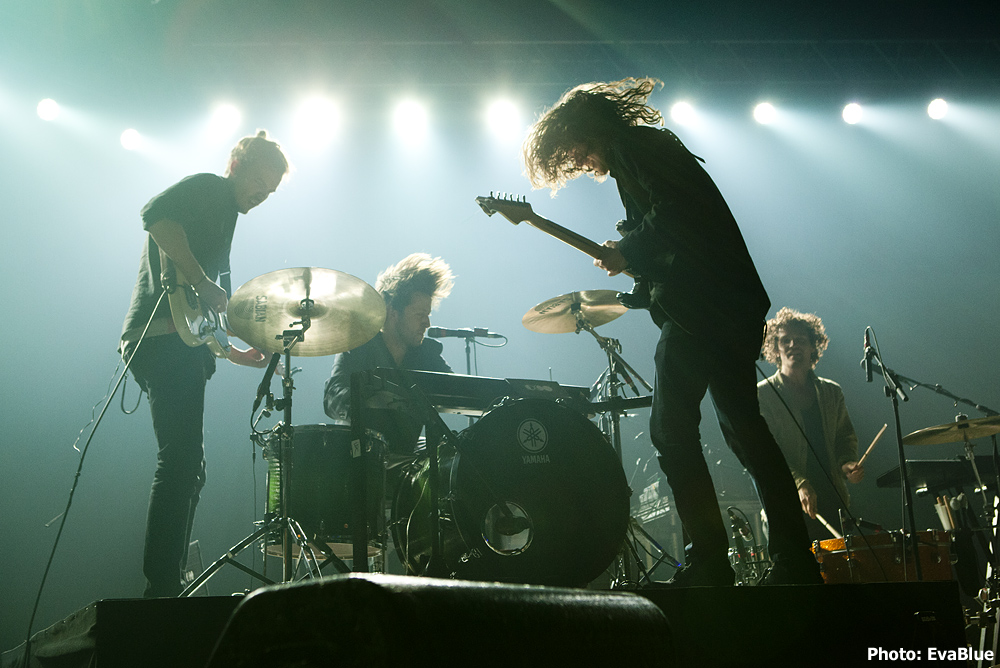
Half Moon Run in 2013

=== 2014–2019: Sun Leads Me On and A Blemish in the Great Light ===
In July 2014, they announced that work on their second album had begun. They announced that it would be released in fall 2015. That same year, they were the recipients of the International Achievement Award at the annual Francophone SOCAN Awards in Montreal.

On 24 July 2015, the band announced a European tour that included shows in the United Kingdom, France, Ireland, Belgium, Germany, and the Netherlands.

On 7 August 2015, the band announced, via their Twitter page, the release of their second studio album, Sun Leads Me On, on 23 October 2015. They simultaneously released a teaser track, "Trust", which was available as a free download with pre-orders of their album. Pre-orders via their website offered the album signed by all band members. A deluxe version was also released.

On 1 November 2019, Half Moon Run released their third full-length album A Blemish in the Great Light. The album won Adult Alternative Album of the Year at the Juno Awards of 2020.

=== 2020–2022: Symonds's departure, The Covideo Sessions and subsequent releases ===
On 25 May 2020, the band announced that Isaac Symonds would be leaving the group.

Throughout May and June 2020 while the band members had been self-isolating due to the COVID-19 pandemic, they recorded and released videos of themselves performing together via video conference. Symonds remained with the group throughout this time. That same year, they also released seven new singles, six of which were then released together as an EP entitled Seasons of Change on 17 July. They followed up in September with The Covideo Sessions, an album featuring the recordings of their May–June video performances.

On 21 August 2020, Dylan Phillips released his debut solo EP entitled Undercurrents.

On 18 March 2021, the band released a single, "How Come My Body", to promote their Inwards & Onwards EP which was released on 18 June 2021.

On 26 December 2021, Half Moon Run released Seasons of Change and Inwards & Onwards together on a compilation album.

On 10 March 2022, the band released "Fatal Line", a song they contributed to The 1969 Record. The album also featured songs from Louis-Jean Cormier, Elisapie, Les Soeurs Boulay, Jason Bajada, and Matt Holubowski.

=== 2023–present: Salt and subsequent releases ===
On 3 March 2023, the band released a single, "You Can Let Go." On the same day, the band announced that they signed to BMG, as well as a tour for Europe and North America. On 20 April 2023, the band released a single, "Alco," to promote their then-upcoming album Salt. This was followed by the release of another single, "Everyone's Moving Out East," on 18 May 2023.

On 2 June 2023, the band released their fourth studio album, Salt.

On 23 October 2023, the band released a cover of Fred Again's "Adore U" as part of a series of songs recorded live in a studio called Live from the Treehouse. The band released the songs periodically over the course of the following few months, including the release of "Can't Stop Loving You" on 29 February 2024. The full EP, Live from the Treehouse, released on 21 March 2024.

On 28 November 2024, the band released a single, "Loose Ends." Three other singles, "Back on the Road", "The Message", and "Another Woman" were released on 31 January 2025, 20 March 2025, and 30 April 2025 respectively. These songs were outtakes from the Salt sessions.

On 23 December 2024, the band released a cover of Bob Dylan's "Boots of Spanish Leather."

On 31 October 2025, the band released a song, "Shadows of Night," which was written for the Witcher season 4 soundtrack.

== Members ==
=== Current ===
- Devon Portielje – lead vocals, guitar, piano, percussion (2009–present)
- Conner Molander – backing vocals, guitar, keyboard, piano, pedal steel, bass, harmonica (2009–present)
- Dylan Phillips – backing vocals, drums, piano, keyboard (2009–present)

=== Former ===
- Isaac Symonds – backing vocals, drums, mandolin, synthesizer, bass (2012–2020)

== Discography ==
=== Albums ===
Title	Album details	Peak chart positions									Sales	Certifications
Title	Album details	CAN	AUS	BEL (Fl)	BEL (Wa)	FRA	NL	UK	US Folk	US Heat	Sales	Certifications
Dark Eyes	Released: 27 March 2012; Label: Indica; Format: Digital download, CD, 12" vinyl	8	—	119	186	138	48	56	—	12	US: 12,000	MC: Platinum
Sun Leads Me On	Released: 23 October 2015; Label: Indica; Format: Digital download, CD, 12" vinyl	4	39	152	81	110	49	46	16	9		MC: Gold
A Blemish in the Great Light	Released: 1 November 2019; Label: Crystal Math Music; Format: Digital download, CD, 12" vinyl	3	—	—	—	—	—	—	—	—		
Salt	Released: 2 June 2023; Label: BMG; Format: Digital download, CD, 12" vinyl	48	—	—	—	—	—	—	—	—		
"—" denotes releases that did not chart

==== Live albums ====
Title	Details
The Covideo Sessions	Released: 4 September 2020; Label: Crystal Math / Glassnote; Format: 12" vinyl, digital download
Live from the Treehouse	Released: 21 March 2024; Label: BMG; Format: Digital download

==== Compilations ====
Title	Details
Seasons of Change – Inwards & Onwards	Released: 26 December 2021; Label: Glassnote; Format: 12" vinyl, CD

=== EPs ===
Title	Details
Seasons of Change	Released: 17 July 2020; Label: Crystal Math / Glassnote; Format: Digital download, 10" vinyl
Inwards & Onwards	Released: 18 June 2021; Label: Crystal Math / Glassnote; Format: Digital download, 10" vinyl

=== Singles ===
Year	Title	Peak chart positions						Certifications	Album
Year	Title	CAN Alt	CAN Rock	BEL (Fl)	NL	SCO	UK	Certifications	Album
2012	"Full Circle"	29	—	27	67	63	60	MC: Platinum	Dark Eyes
2013	"Call Me in the Afternoon"	19	39	69	—	—	166	MC: Gold	Dark Eyes
2014	"She Wants to Know"	22	37	—	—	—	—		Dark Eyes
2015	"Trust"	—	—	—	—	—	—		Sun Leads Me On
2015	"Turn Your Love"	11	13	—	—	—	—	MC: Gold	Sun Leads Me On
2016	"Consider Yourself"	—	43	—	—	—	—		Sun Leads Me On
2019	"Then Again"	—	21	—	—	—	—		A Blemish in the Great Light
2019	"Flesh and Blood"	—	—	—	—	—	—		A Blemish in the Great Light
2019	"Favourite Boy"	—	36	—	—	—	—		A Blemish in the Great Light
2020	"Grow into Love"	—	—	—	—	—	—	MC: Gold	Seasons of Change EP
2020	"All at Once"	—	—	—	—	—	—		Seasons of Change EP
2020	"Jello on My Mind (More Sugar Mix)"	—	—	—	—	—	—		Non-album single
2020	"You Won't" / "Look Me in the Eyes (Skitstövel)"	—	—	—	—	—	—		Seasons of Change EP
2020	"Monster"	—	—	—	—	—	—		Seasons of Change EP
2020	"Seasons of Change"	—	—	—	—	—	—		Seasons of Change EP
2021	"How Come My Body"	—	—	—	—	—	—		Inwards & Onwards
2022	"Fatal Line"	—	—	—	—	—	—		The 1969 Record
2023	"You Can Let Go"	—	—	—	—	—	—		Salt
2023	"Alco"	—	—	—	—	—	—		Salt
2023	"Everyone's Moving Out East"	—	—	—	—	—	—		Salt
2023	"Adore U"	—	—	—	—	—	—		Live from the Treehouse
2024	"Can't Stop Loving You"	—	—	—	—	—	—		Live from the Treehouse
2024	"Loose Ends"	—	—	—	—	—	—		Non-album single
2024	"Boots of Spanish Leather"	—	—	—	—	—	—		Non-album single
2025	"Back on the Road"	—	—	—	—	—	—		Non-album single
2025	"The Message"	—	—	—	—	—	—		Non-album single
2025	"Another Woman"	—	—	—	—	—	—		Non-album single
2025	"Shadows of Night"	—	—	—	—	—	—		The Witcher: Season 4 (Soundtrack from the Netflix Original Series)
"—" denotes a single that did not chart or was not released.

=== Other charted songs ===
Year	Title	Peak chart positions	Album
Year	Title	BEL (Fl)	Album
2013	"Nerve"	36	Dark Eyes

=== Music Videos ===
Year	Title	Director
2012	"Full Circle"	Pierre-Luc Racine
2012	"Call Me in the Afternoon"	Człowiek Kamera
2014	"Judgement"	Matt Joycey
2014	"No More Losing the War"	Człowiek Kamera
2015	"Turn Your Love"	—
2015	"I Can't Figure Out What's Going On"	Heston L'Abbé
2016	"Consider Yourself"	Devon Portielje and Conner Molander
2017	"Hands in the Garden"	Agathe Bray-Bourret
2019	"Then Again"	Sacha Roy
2019	"Flesh and Blood"	Sacha Roy
2019	"Favourite Boy"	Philippe Grenier
2020	"Look Me in the Eyes (Skitstövel)"	—
2020	"Monster"	—
2021	"How Come My Body"	—
2021	"On & On"	Alex Tomlinson
2021	"It's True"	Michał Biegański
2021	"Fxgiving"	—
2023	"You Can Let Go"	Alex Tomlinson
2023	"Alco"	Marc-André Dupaul
2023	"Everyone's Moving Out East"	Maïlis
