= It's Not A Cult =

2025 book

- Author: Joey Batey
- Publication date: October 23, 2025
- ISBN: 9781526676818

It's Not A Cult is an adult horror fiction novel by Joey Batey. It was published October 23, 2025, by the publisher Raven Books, an imprint of Bloomsbury Publishing. This is Batey's debut novel, though he has said he had been writing for about seventeen years prior to its release.

The story follows the characters Callum, Melusine, and Al. The three of them are in a band with no name that hasn't reached more than 97 subscribers in several years. Their band features tales about gods, or Solkats, who represent the minute things in life.

Currently, the audiobook can only be purchased within the UK, but the physical book is available worldwide. The Broken Binding is selling a special edition copy, which are signed and have painted edges of the Solkats.

== Summary ==
The three main characters in It's Not A Cult bring the spirit of the band together. While their music is described as amateurish at times, Mel, Callum, and Al are so involved in their art and the creation of the Solkat stories to give up trying.

Callum began the stories of the Solkats when he was still in art school. Eventually he found that music was the best way to tell these stories, and without Mel, the stories probably wouldn't have been told at all. When Al eventually joins the band, they begin to grow an online presence because of her help with recording their performances.

== Solkats ==
There are twenty-four Solkats in total.

Photo	Name	Title
	Bizen	The Witch, Solkat of children's lies
	Hadaway	Solkat of rust and texts at three in the morning
	Fast	Solkat of cold calls and blighted crops
	Canny	Solkat of betting shops and unheard jokes
	Marra	The Companion, holder of hands and pints
	Whisht	Solkat of red wine stains and noise
	Cowp and Creels	The Tricksters, Solkat of stubbed toes and fateful meetings
	Skinchies	The Luck Monger, Solkat of bus stop fights and fear
	Neb	Solkat of falling petals and looking at someone else's phone
	War Lass	The Last Word You'll Hear, Solkat of one too many
	Belter	Wielder of the Thyrsus, Solkat of neon wristbands and punishment
	Radge	The Cripple, Solkat of masks and mortar
	Sneck	Solkat of thumb prints and blurted thoughts
	Yem	The Mother, Solkat of empty beds
	Haporth	Solkat of lost coins in pocket holes, charity shops and memory
	Scran	Solkat of bar tabs, reckonings and squander
	Spelk	The Muzzled Hound, Solkat of cramps and forgotten bruises
	Hackies	Solkat of breath, side-eyes and nightmares
	Clarty	Solkat of smudged lipstick, mud and change
	Hockle	The Antecedent, Solkat of spit and nervous moments
	Monkey's Blood	Solkat of aftertaste and imagined conversations
	The Blatherskite	Voluble Purveyor of Nonsense, Solkat of perversion, politics and escape
	The Bagsies	The Wild Sisters, Solkat of promises and payment
	Bonnie	The Wind on Windows, Solkat of fairy lights, flirting and falling
