= A Blemish in the Great Light =

Studio album by Half Moon Run
- Released: November 1, 2019
- Studio: Planet Studios (Montreal); Bathouse Recording Studio (Bath)
- Genre: Indie rock, indie folk, indie pop
- Length: 40:25
- Label: Crystal Math, Glassnote
- Producer: Joe Chiccarelli

Half Moon Run chronology
| Sun Leads Me On (2015) | A Blemish in the Great Light (2019) | Seasons of Change (2023) |

Singles from Half Moon Run
- 1. "Then Again" Released: August 9, 2019; 2. "Flesh and Blood" Released: September 13, 2019; 3. "Favourite Boy" Released: October 18, 2019

A Blemish in the Great Light is the third studio album by the Canadian indie rock band Half Moon Run, released in 2019. The album peaked at #3 on the Canadian Albums Chart and won Adult Alternative Album of the Year at the Juno Awards of 2020.

Professional ratings
Aggregate scores
| Source | Rating |
|---|---|
| Metacritic | 69/100 |
Review scores
| Source | Rating |
| AllMusic | 3.5/5 stars |
| Exclaim! | 7/10 |

== Track listing ==
All tracks written by Half Moon Run

Original Canadian release
| No. | Title | Length |
|---|---|---|
| 1. | "Then Again" | 3:19 |
| 2. | "Favourite Boy" | 4:02 |
| 3. | "Flesh and Blood" | 4:57 |
| 4. | "Natural Disaster" | 3:43 |
| 5. | "Black Diamond" | 2:59 |
| 6. | "Yani's Song" | 2:41 |
| 7. | "Razorblade" | 7:26 |
| 8. | "Undercurrents" | 2:18 |
| 9. | "Jello on My Mind" | 3:52 |
| 10. | "New Truth" | 5:08 |
| Total length: | | 40:25 |

== Personnel ==
=== Half Moon Run ===
- Devon Portielje
- Dylan Phillips
- Isaac Symonds
- Conner Molander

=== Additional musicians ===
- Quatuor Esca – string quartet
- Colin Stetson – saxophone
- Pietro Amato – French horn
- Christopher Seligman – French horn
- Chœur des enfants de Montréal - choir
- Rowan Grace Mizerski – additional vocals

=== Production ===
- Joe Chiccareli – producer, engineer
- Nyles Spencer – engineer on "Undercurrents" and "Jello on My Mind"
- Dylan Phillips – producer on "Undercurrents", string/choir/horn arrangements
- Devon Portielje – bass saxophone arrangement on "Then Again"
- Chris Shaw – mixing
- Emily Lazar – mastering
- Chris Allgood – mastering
- Samuel Woywitka – engineer
- Jacob Lacroix-Cardinal – engineer
- Lars Fox – digital editing
- Léa Moisan-Perrier – soprano, choir director
- Ross Stirling — layout and design
- Yani Clarke – photography
- Isaac Symonds – back cover photo
