= Sun Leads Me On =

Studio album by Half Moon Run
- Released: October 23, 2015
- Studio: Bathouse Recording Studio (Bath)
- Genre: Indie rock, Indie folk, Indie pop
- Length: 47:50
- Label: Indica, Glassnote
- Producer: Jim Abbiss

Half Moon Run chronology
Dark Eyes (2012)	Sun Leads Me On (2015)	A Blemish in the Great Light (2019)

Singles from Sun Leads Me On
- 1. "Trust" Released: August 7, 2015; 2. "Turn Your Love" Released: September 11, 2015

Sun Leads Me On is the second studio album by Canadian indie rock band Half Moon Run. It was released through Indica Records in Canada on October 23, 2015, and through Glassnote/Universal in the rest of the world. The lead single, "Trust", was released on August 7, 2015.

Professional ratings
Aggregate scores
Source	Rating
Metacritic	74/100
Review scores
Source	Rating
AllMusic	4/5 stars
Exclaim!	7/10

== Track listing ==
Original Canadian release
No.	Title	Length
1.	"Warmest Regards"	3:15
2.	"I Can't Figure Out What's Going On"	3:15
3.	"Consider Yourself"	3:53
4.	"Hands in the Garden"	3:52
5.	"Turn Your Love"	4:02
6.	"Narrow Margins"	4:11
7.	"Sun Leads Me On"	4:06
8.	"It Works Itself Out"	4:07
9.	"Everybody Wants"	5:01
10.	"Throes"	0:54
11.	"Devil May Care"	2:22
12.	"The Debt"	4:01
13.	"Trust"	4:51

== Charts ==
Chart (2015)	Peak position
Australian Albums (ARIA)	39
Belgian Albums (Ultratop Flanders)	152
Belgian Albums (Ultratop Wallonia)	81
Canadian Albums (Billboard)	4
Dutch Albums (Album Top 100)	49
French Albums (SNEP)	110
UK Albums (OCC)	46
US Folk Albums (Billboard)	16
US Heatseekers Albums (Billboard)	9

== Personnel ==
=== Half Moon Run ===
- Devon Portielje
- Dylan Phillips
- Isaac Symonds
- Conner Molander

=== Additional musicians ===
- Quatuor Quatres Ailes – string quartet
- Tazmyn Eddy – trumpet, flugelhorn
- Alex Héon-Goulet – flute

=== Production ===
- Jim Abbis – producer
- Barny Barnicott – mixing
- Greg Calbi – mastering
- Yani Clarke – photography
- Ross Stirling – layout and design
- Ian Dowling – engineer
- Sam Bidinost – assistant
- Mike Gavriel – assistant
