= Sonya Belousova =

American composer, pianist

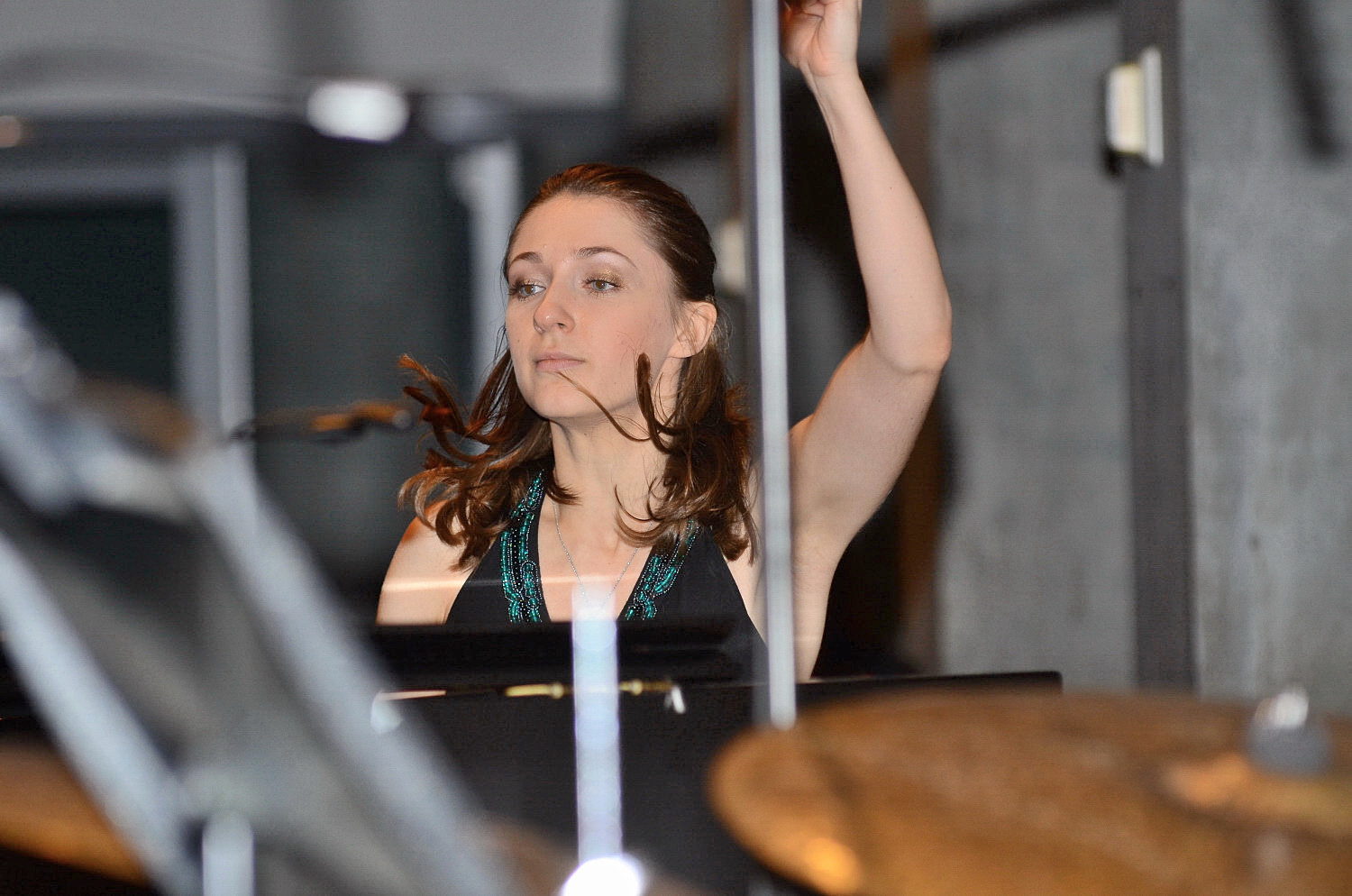
- Belousova performing at the 2014 Golden Score Awards

Background information
- Born: February 4, 1990 (age 36); Leningrad, Russian SFSR, Soviet Union (now Saint Petersburg, Russia)
- Genres: Film score, rock, pop, contemporary, classical
- Occupations: Composer, music producer, songwriter
- Website: belousova-ostinelli.com

Sonya Belousova (born February 4, 1990) is a Russian-American composer, music producer, songwriter, and artist whose viral hit Toss A Coin To Your Witcher reached #1 on the Billboard charts. Based in Los Angeles, California, Belousova has composed music for some of the most commercially successful television franchises, including One Piece and The Witcher.

Belousova composed the score and songs for Netflix's live-action adaptation of One Piece, which became a global hit. The soundtrack features the song My Sails Are Set, written and produced by Belousova and her scoring partner Giona Ostinelli, and performed by Aurora. The song has garnered over 20 million streams on Spotify, contributing to the album's overall success with more than 300 million streams worldwide. Polygon praised the "devilish duo" for their "freewheeling" score, which "swings from symphonic blockbuster cues to hip-hop licks to virtuosic flamenco guitar, jazz funk, big-band brass, and head-spinning circus music." ScreenRant lauded the soundtrack for its "next-level musical worldbuilding" and "unique character themes and instruments complementing each other perfectly."

Belousova gained widespread recognition for her work on Netflix's hit fantasy series The Witcher. The soundtrack album, featuring songs and score composed and produced by Belousova and Ostinelli, achieved both commercial success and critical acclaim, amassing over half a billion streams worldwide. The single Toss a Coin to Your Witcher reached #1 on both Billboard Digital Rock Songs Sales and iTunes Top Soundtrack Songs, and broke into The Billboard 200. The song quickly became a viral sensation, garnering significant media attention. The New York Post called it "the breakout hit," Thrillist "the biggest banger of 2020", Entertainment Weekly "a viral hit", Esquire "the best part of Netflix's series", The Verge "the hit song of the season", while Forbes stated that "the viral earworm became just as famous as the show". The soundtrack album appeared on multiple Billboard charts, including Billboard Top Current Albums, Billboard Top Album Sales, and Billboard Top Soundtrack Albums. It debuted at #1 on iTunes Top Soundtracks and #4 on iTunes Top Albums, trailing only Eminem, Breaking Benjamin, and Chase Rice, and reached the top ten in every major territory worldwide.

Belousova is recognized for her project Player Piano (first introduced as Cosplay Piano from the executive producer Stan Lee of Marvel Comics). She performed at the 2013 San Diego Comic-Con, introduced by Stan Lee, and at the 2014 Anime Expo with a 70-piece orchestra and 30-piece choir.

Belousova was commissioned by Festival Ballet Providence to compose three original ballets with choreographer Viktor Plotnikov. Additionally, she is known for her collaboration with 27-time Grammy and 2-time Academy Award nominated producer and arranger Jorge Calandrelli.

== Early life and education ==
Belousova was born in Saint Petersburg, Russia. She began piano studies at age 5 and composition at 10 under composer Zhanna Metallidi. At 8, she made her debut at the Chamber Hall of Saint Petersburg Philharmonia. At 12, she received a special prize for her original compositions at the Sergei Slonimsky Piano And Composition Competition, and at 13, she won the International Valery Gavrilin Composition Competition. Belousova won the competition twice, in 2003 and 2004. Recognized as a child prodigy, Belousova received the Russian Ministry of Culture Award in 2003. In 2004, she won the International Anton Rubinstein Piano Competition Miniatures In Russian Music.

Belousova continued her training in Moscow, where she was accepted to the Gnessin State Musical College at 15, earning a dual bachelor's degree in music composition and piano performance. At 17, she won the Rodion Shchedrin Piano And Composition Competition and performed at the Grand Hall of Moscow Conservatory.

She later attended Berklee College of Music for film scoring and earned a master's degree from the University of California, Los Angeles.

== Career ==
=== Film and Television ===
Sonya Belousova has composed and produced some of the most commercially successful television soundtracks in recent years, including One Piece and The Witcher, both of which are global hits on Netflix. She worked alongside her scoring partner, Giona Ostinelli, to create the music for these franchises, with their soundtracks amassing millions of streams and receiving widespread acclaim.

Belousova is known for her collaborations with other artists, such as Norwegian art-pop singer Aurora on My Sails Are Set, a single Belousova composed and produced for her One Piece soundtrack. She also collaborated with acoustic guitar virtuoso Marcin and rap artist Flawless Real Talk on the same soundtrack.

The One Piece soundtrack, featuring over 110 musicians, was praised for its rich stylistic variety, imaginative instrumentation, and complex musical world-building. Each character in One Piece has a unique musical theme with tailored instrumentation. Belousova described the score as "incredibly diverse, spanning a wide array of styles and genres from songs to virtuosic flamenco guitar, hip-hop to big band jazz funk fusion, folk to circus, rap to big epic swashbuckling orchestra." She emphasized that this musical and stylistic diversity was the main priority when approaching music world-building for One Piece. Luffy’s theme, which she described as the "main theme of our show," is a reversed version of Gold Roger’s theme and is led by a hurdy-gurdy. Zoro’s three-sword fighting style is portrayed using bansuri, frame drum, and duduk for his Wado Ichimonji sword, while Nami’s theme features a flute. Usopp's theme is performed by an ukulele, reflecting his ongoing quest for self-confidence, and Sanji’s suave flair is captured by a big band jazz-funk fusion ensemble.

Belousova also created distinct themes for the villains. Buggy’s theme exudes a circus vibe, while Mihawk’s mastery is conveyed through flamenco guitar performed by Marcin.

The soundtrack was recorded across various locations, involving artists from different cultural backgrounds, which contributed to the global flavor of the music and reflected the show's international appeal. The soundtrack was nominated for the International Film Music Critics Association Awards for Best Original Score for Television.

Belousova gained widespread recognition for her work on The Witcher soundtrack. She also wrote and produced its hit single, Toss A Coin To Your Witcher. The song became a viral sensation immediately after its release. It has also been heavily used in the marketing of the series ever since. On Spotify and other streaming platforms, the song quickly gained millions of streams. Its commercial success cemented it as one of the standout tracks from the series, appealing to both fans of the show and general audiences alike. Toss A Coin reached #1 on both Billboard’s Digital Rock Songs Sales and iTunes’ Top Soundtrack Songs, while also breaking into The Billboard 200. The song also reached the top ten in every major territory worldwide, reflecting its international success. CNN described it as "the new year’s earworm," adding: "Just try and not get Toss a Coin to Your Witcher stuck in your head. The tune from the Netflix series The Witcher has gone viral."

The song's impact extended far beyond streaming platforms. It became a cultural phenomenon, inspiring viral memes, countless TikTok videos, and YouTube covers and remixes, with notable orchestras and musicians creating covers of the song. Its wide appeal led to Toss A Coin being adapted into different musical genres and languages, with metal, folk, and orchestral renditions performed globally.

Toss A Coin To Your Witcher was performed live at various events. Notably, Belousova headlined the Krakow Film Music Festival performing her own arrangement of the song featuring a 70-piece orchestra and 30-piece choir, which she later released under Sony Music as part of The Witcher Suite.

Additionally, the soundtrack album, which features Toss A Coin To Your Witcher, broke into several Billboard charts, including Billboard Top Current Albums, Billboard Top Album Sales, and Billboard Top Soundtrack Albums, and amassed over half a billion streams to date.

The creative process behind the song was a collaboration between Belousova and her scoring partner, Giona Ostinelli. Belousova has said that the song was crafted to have a "medieval, yet modern sound" that could resonate with a wide audience. Ostinelli added that they wanted to capture the essence of the bard character, Jaskier, through the music while creating something timeless and catchy.

The song also became a significant part of The Witcher's marketing and promotional campaigns. The Witcher soundtrack, including Toss A Coin To Your Witcher, was nominated for several Hollywood Music In Media Awards.

In 2020, Tesla, Inc. added Belousova's Toss a Coin to Your Witcher to its software, making it possible to replace the vehicle's horn with Belousova's chorus.

In 2024, it was announced that Belousova will compose and produce the soundtrack for the upcoming Red Sonja reboot (based on the Marvel character under the same name).

Belousova's work also includes composing the soundtracks for NBC drama The Thing About Pam starring Renée Zellweger, Matthew Weiner’s The Romanoffs, featuring a star-studded cast Isabelle Huppert, Amanda Peet, Aaron Eckhart, Diane Lane, Blumhouse’s Sacred Lies, starring Juliette Lewis, Paramount Network’s adaptation of Stephen King’s The Mist, among others.

=== A Mighty Heart Beating Like A Drum ===
In 2023, Sonya Belousova released the album A Mighty Heart Beating Like A Drum under Sony Music, featuring guest artists such as Serj Tankian of System of a Down, Tarja Turunen formerly of Nightwish, DL of Bad Wolves, Sophia James, and Marcin. Broadway World described the album as "an epic tale of discovery and growth." Belousova explained the album's concept as representing the journey of leaping into the unknown and navigating unexpected twists and turns with "a strong heart and an open mind."

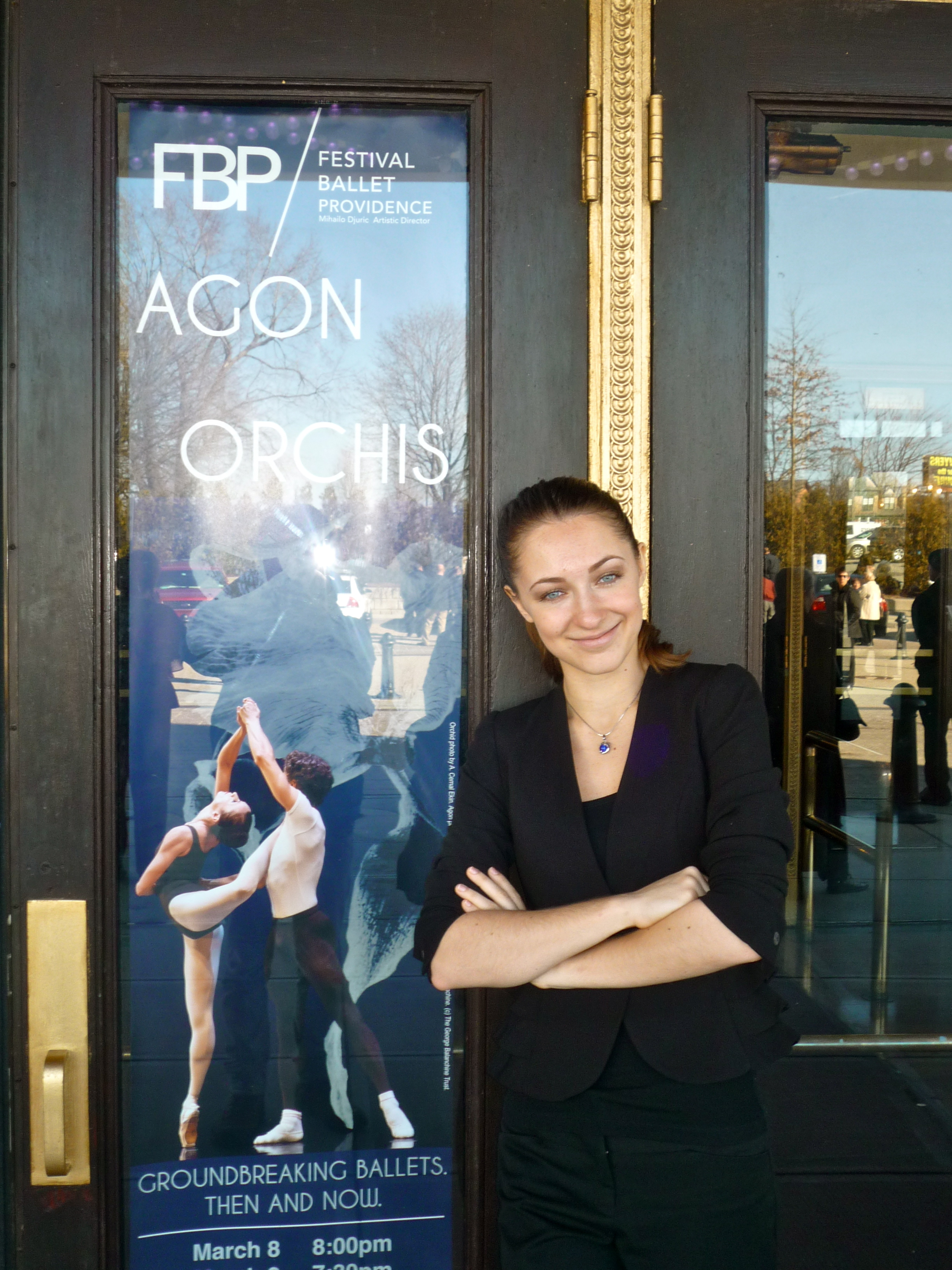
Belousova at the premiere of Orchis by the Festival Ballet Providence

=== Ballet ===
In 2013, Sonya Belousova was commissioned by Festival Ballet Providence to compose music for the new ballet Orchis, in collaboration with choreographer Viktor Plotnikov. Plotnikov, referring to his collaboration with Belousova, remarked, "I listen to the music, what it tells me…and I have the piece."

Orchis premiered on March 8, 2013, at the Veterans Memorial Auditorium alongside Igor Stravinsky's Agon. Described as "a big hit" and "stunning collaboration," Orchis returned to the stage the following season as a part of the Boundless Plotnkov program. "Audiences were blown away by the eccentric, wide range of Sonya Belousova's original score, striking a rich parallel to Viktor Plotnikov’s unique choreography". In recognition of her achievements "throughout the international music world," Belousova received an honorary citation from the Mayor of Providence.

In 2014, Belousova was commissioned for another ballet, Surrogate, which premiered in November as part of the Up Close On Hope series. "Accompanied by Sonya Belousova’s techno sounding original score, this thought-provoking piece questions whether we have all become 'surrogates,' unable to think and act for ourselves. Wearing tutus, three female dancers are accompanied by their male partners who move them about by grabbing hold of their ponytails."

In 2016, Belousova composed the score for The House of Bernarda Alba, an adaptation of Federico García Lorca's play. "There is very little that is pretty about this piece, but it is thoroughly compelling. The movements are large, but awkward, and the daughters almost resemble marionettes manipulated by their controlling matriarch. Despite this, there is nothing that feels cartoonish, thanks in large part to the fantastic original score by Sonya Belousova. The visuals, dance and music all come together to create something that will linger in the viewer's mind for a long time." – Broadway World.

=== Player Piano ===
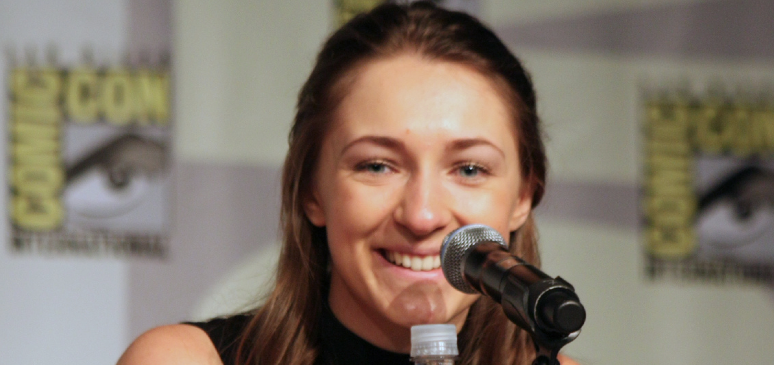
Belousova at the 2013 San Diego Comic-Con

Belousova gained public recognition for her music project Player Piano. The project was first introduced in 2013 as Cosplay Piano with Marvel's Stan Lee as the executive producer, featured on Stan Lee’s World of Heroes YouTube channel. In 2014 Belousova formed Player Piano, blending virtuosic piano performances with her creative reimaginings of iconic themes. The project has received multiple awards and garnered extensive media coverage, including features in MTV, Forbes, USA Today, and Entertainment Weekly.

Belousova crafted and performed original arrangements, showcasing her versatility from virtuosic solo piano to large ensemble works, often reimagining iconic themes with "a new unique spin". Tom Grey directed her music videos.

Belousova's Player Piano performances include San Diego Comic-Con, where she opened her panel with Stan Lee, and Anime Expo, where she performed as a soloist with a 70-piece orchestra and 30-piece choir to a sold-out crowd.

=== Collaboration with Jorge Calandrelli ===
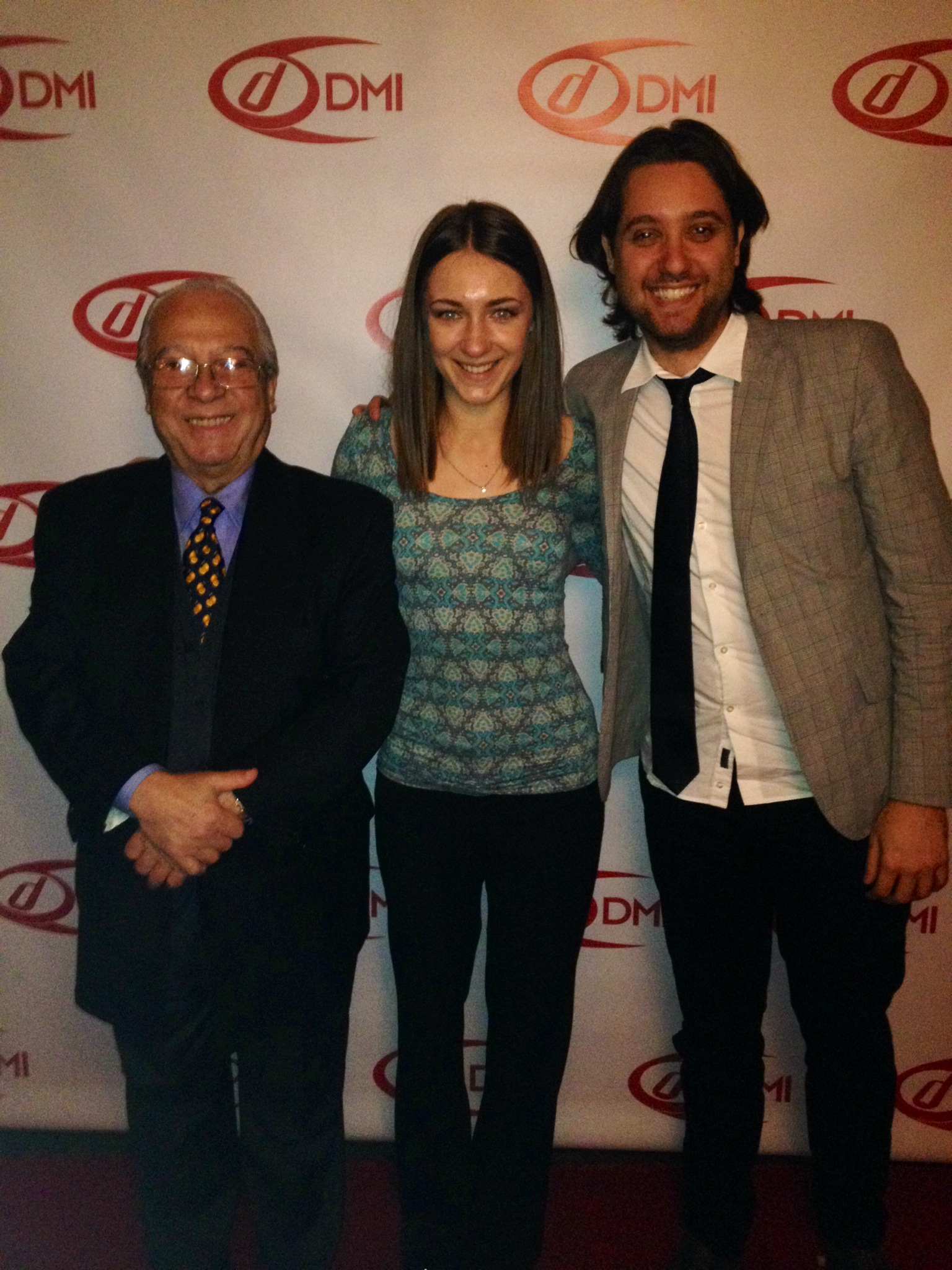
Belousova with Jorge Calandrelli and Giona Ostinelli at the DMI Grammy Party

Belousova is known for her collaboration with 27-time Grammy 2-time Academy Award nominated producer, arranger, and composer Jorge Calandrelli, who described her as "one of the most talented musicians I have met". Calandrelli produced Belousova's solo piano album, which featured her performing piano pieces he had written. The recording sessions took place at Capitol Records.

Belousova collaborated with Calandrelli on Roberto Iarussi's 2013 album I Believe, recorded by the London Symphony Orchestra. In 2014, she arranged and orchestrated Jingle Bells, Panis Angelicus, All Creatures of God, Carpe Diem, and Nature Boy for Mario Frangoulis’s album Tales of Christmas. The album was recorded by the London Philharmonic Orchestra at Abbey Road Studios and featured duets with Grammy winners Sarah Brightman and Marilyn Horne, and George Perris. Belousova also recorded piano for Jingle Bells and Panis Angelicus.

In 2014, Belousova performed Calandrelli’s piano pieces at the ASMAC Golden Score Awards, honoring Maestro Calandrelli and Academy Award winning composer Michael Giacchino. Special guests for the event included Grammy winners Arturo Sandoval, Walter Afanasieff, and Kenny G.

== Awards and nominations ==
Year	Award	Category	Nominated work	Result
2025	Emmy Award	Outstanding Music Direction and Composition for a Live Action Program	One Piece	Nominated
2025	Emmy Award	Outstanding Original Song for a Children's or Young Teen Program ("My Sails Are Set" feat. Aurora)	One Piece	Won
2024	International Film Music Critic Association Award	Best Original Score for Television	One Piece	nominated
2024	Movie Music UK Award	Best Original Score for Television	One Piece	nominated
2024	Soundtrack World EsWay Award	Best Soundtrack for a Television Series	One Piece	won
2023	BMI Film, TV & Visual Media Award	BMI Network Television Award	The Thing About Pam	won
2021	BMI Film, TV & Visual Media Award	BMI Streaming Series Award	The Witcher	won
2020	Hollywood Music In Media Award	Best Original Song - TV Show/Limited Series	Toss A Coin To Your Witcher	nominated
2020	Hollywood Music In Media Award	Best Main Title Theme - TV Show/Limited Series	The Witcher	nominated
2020	BMI Film, TV & Visual Media Award	BMI Streaming Media Award	The Romanoffs	won
2016	Jerry Goldsmith Award	Free Creation	The House of Bernarda Alba	nominated
2016	Global Music Award		The House of Bernarda Alba	won
2015	Telly Award	Best Use of Music	Player Piano	won
2015	Telly Award	Best Music Video/Concert	Player Piano	won
2015	Telly Award	Best Online Video	Player Piano	won
2015	Telly Award	Best Web Series	Player Piano	won
2015	Telly Award	Best Entertainment	Player Piano	won
2015	International Academy of Web Television Award	Best Sound	Player Piano	won
2015	International Academy of Web Television Award	Best Variety Series	Player Piano	won
2015	Streamy Award	Best Independent Series	Player Piano	nominated
2015	Geekie Award	Best Series Non-Scripted	Player Piano	nominated
2014	International Academy of Web Television Award	Best New Webseries	Cosplay Piano	won
2013	Geekie Award	Best Webseries	Cosplay Piano	won
2007	Rodion Shchedrin Piano And Composition Competition			won
2005	International Valery Gavrilin Composition Competition I Am A Composer	Electronic And Digital Music		won
2004	International Valery Gavrilin Composition Competition I Am A Composer	Concert Music		won
2004	International Anton Rubinstein Piano Competition Miniatures In Russian Music			won
2003	Russian Ministry of Culture Award			won
2003	International Valery Gavrilin Composition Competition I Am A Composer	Concert Music		won
2003	Sound & Synthesis International Music Festival			participated
2002	Sergei Slonimsky Piano And Composition Competition Little Pianist And Composer			Special Prize for Best Original Compositions

== Works ==
=== Films and television ===
Year	Title	Director/Creator	Production company/Network
2025	Red Sonja	M.J. Bassett	Millennium Films, Dynamite Entertainment
2023–present	One Piece (soundtrack)	Matt Owens and Steven Maeda	Kaji Productions, Tomorrow Studios, Shueisha / Netflix
2023	Orca: Black & White Gold	Sarah Nörenberg	Terra Mater Factual Studios
2022	The Thing About Pam	Jenny Klein	Blumhouse Television, Big Picture Co., Weird Egg Productions / NBC
2019–present	The Witcher	Lauren Schmidt Hissrich	The Sean Daniel Company / Netflix
2019	Inside Man: Most Wanted	M.J. Bassett	Universal 1440 Entertainment / Netflix
2019	Lying and Stealing	Matt Aselton	Vertical Entertainment
2018-2020	Sacred Lies	Raelle Tucker	Blumhouse Television / Peacock
2018	The Romanoffs	Matthew Weiner	Amazon Studios
2018	Reprisal	Brian A. Miller	Grindstone Entertainment Group / Lionsgate
2017	The Mist	Christian Torpe	The Weinstein Company, Paramount Network
2017	M.F.A.	Natalia Leite	Villainess Productions, Dark Sky Films
2017	Like Me	Robert Mockler	Glass Eye Pix, Amazon
2016	Millennials: The Musical	Scott Brown	Studio71, Seven Bucks Productions
2015	How Sarah Got Her Wings	Gary Entin and Edmund Entin	MarVista Entertainment
2015	Christmas Trade	Joel Souza	Brand Inc. Entertainment
2015	The Boat Builder	Arnold Grossman	Blue Creek Pictures, Reunion Films
2015	The Massively Mixed-Up Middle School Mystery	Will Eisenberg and Aaron Eisenberg	Principato-Young Entertainment, Nickelodeon
2015	The Remains	Thomas Della Bella	Diablo Entertainment, EBF Productions
2014	Aztec Blood (TV pilot)	Clara Mamet	EBF Productions
2014	Indigenous	Alastair Orr	Kilburn Media
2014	Two-Bit Waltz	Clara Mamet	EBF Productions, Monterey Media

=== Ballet ===
Premiere	Title	Choreographer	Company	Artistic Director
March 4, 2016	The House of Bernarda Alba	Viktor Plotnikov	Festival Ballet Providence	Mihailo Djuric
November 1, 2014	Surrogate	Viktor Plotnikov	Festival Ballet Providence	Mihailo Djuric
March 8, 2013	Orchis	Viktor Plotnikov	Festival Ballet Providence	Mihailo Djuric
