= Toss a Coin to Your Witcher =

Single by Sonya Belousova, Giona Ostinelli, and Joey Batey

from the album The Witcher (Music from the Netflix Original Series)
- Released: January 22, 2020
- Length: 3:10
- Label: Milan
- Composers: Sonya Belousova; Giona Ostinelli
- Lyricist: Jenny Klein
- Producers: Sonya Belousova; Giona Ostinelli

"Toss a Coin to Your Witcher" is an original song from the Netflix TV series The Witcher, composed by Sonya Belousova and Giona Ostinelli with lyrics by Jenny Klein, and sung by Joey Batey (as Jaskier) in the second episode. It became a viral hit shortly after the series' release in late December 2019. The song was remixed by fans in YouTube videos and received new covers within days.

== Development ==
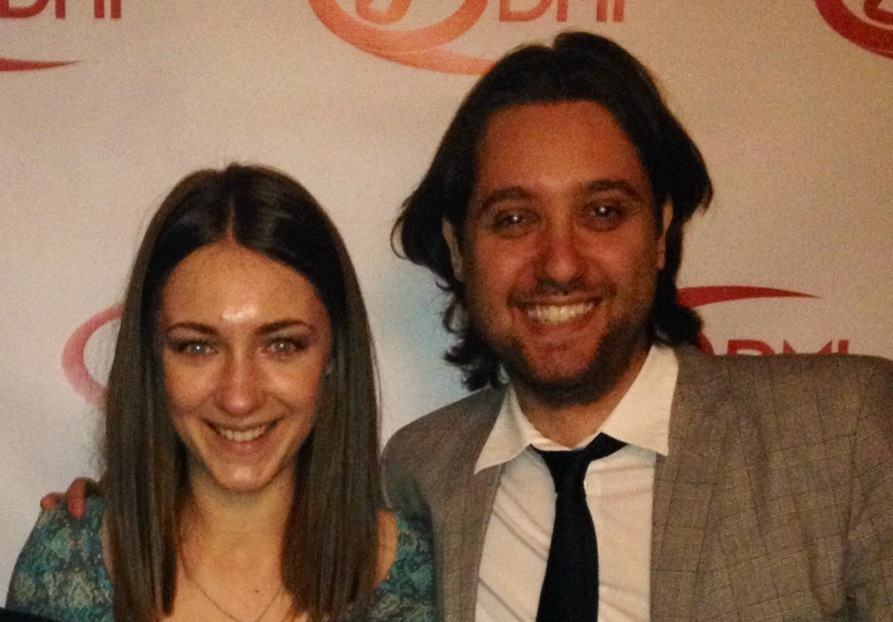
Belousova and Ostinelli in 2014

The song was created specifically for the TV series, and does not appear in the novels the series is based on. The idea for the song was initiated by screenwriter Jenny Klein, who was assigned to write the screenplay for the second episode of the show. It had been established that the episode would be the introduction of the bard Jaskier (played by Joey Batey) to Geralt of Rivia (Henry Cavill). As Jaskier's talkativeness would wear on Geralt, the writers needed to find a reason why Geralt would let Jaskier travel with him, and showrunner Lauren Hissrich came up with the idea that among Jaskier's songs would be one that would help prove Geralt's generally peaceful intentions to those who distrust him and give him some respect, which would also be a mirror of the story for Yennefer of Vengerberg (Anya Chalotra), a quarter-elf sorceress also trying to do good despite her appearance; in the episode, the song is played over images of both Geralt and Yennefer. Since Klein was the writer for this episode, she was tasked to come up with the lyrics as well. Besides working out the necessary poetry, Klein reviewed the original Witcher novels, and it struck her that Geralt never got paid for the work he did, inspiring her to the key line "Toss a coin to your Witcher". Klein said that once she had this line, the rest of the lyrics took about ten minutes to finish off.

The lyrics were then given to composers Sonya Belousova and Giona Ostinelli to score as one of the first musical elements they did for the show. They had planned to try a range of styles to see what best suited the song while keeping some contemporary element, including a possible rap style. However, one of their earliest attempts hit the mark for them right off the bat and they decided to stay with that, working over the next eight months to get the right sound that they wanted, bringing in a range of musical instruments from around the globe to test. The final recording for the song used on the show was made in London on July 4, 2019, at which point Batey was sick, though Belousova credits Batey for soldiering on to give them enough material to work with. When the final production for the show was made about six months later, Batey performed a lip-sync for the song.

Since Netflix releases its content with dubbing in a number of languages, the song has been officially translated and rendered in at least 13 other languages: Polish, Ukrainian, Czech, Japanese, German, Russian, French, Italian, Portuguese, Hindi, Hungarian, Spanish, Latin Spanish and Turkish.

Netflix released an official version of the song to digital and streaming music services on January 22, 2020.

== Content ==
The song lyrics are based on the events of the show's second episode, which is also the first meeting of the bard Jaskier (the in-universe author of the song) and Geralt of Rivia, the titular witcher and the show's main protagonist. After recognizing Geralt at a bar, Jaskier follows him on a journey to investigate an alleged grain-stealing monster, and the pair end up being captured by Filavandrel aén Fidháil, the leader of an Elven uprising. Released after narrowly avoiding execution together, Jaskier concludes that Geralt is burdened by his "Butcher of Blaviken" moniker and decides to help him fix the publicity problem. He then composes the song praising Geralt's heroics, the narration of which takes great liberty over what actually happened during their imprisonment.

== Impact ==
The song became a viral hit shortly after the series' release. The song was remixed hundreds of times by fans in YouTube videos with some remixes getting millions of views, while users have created mods to patch the song into the video game adaptions of The Witcher. Some covers are unofficial translations into different languages, for example the rendering of the song in the Silesian dialect of Polish language has been gaining popularity among Polish Internet users.

The song's composers Belousova and Ostinelli were pleased to see so many different fan versions, as they feel the fans were capturing the same fun that they were having in experimenting in different styles they had tried for the song. Klein was amazed at how fast the song had caught on with fans and credited Belousova and Ostinelli for creating a catchy composition.

The series premiered on December 20, 2019; however, Netflix has been criticized for failing to release the song officially, with no official release outside of a SoundCloud release until January 22. This delay has been described as inexplicable and as a missed marketing opportunity.

The actor Joey Batey, who sang the song, called it "the most annoying thing I've ever heard, it's so catchy... I've had that in my head for eight months."

Four versions of the track have charted in the Official UK Singles Sales Chart. On January 10, 2020, Samuel Kim featuring Black Gryph0n's version made number 93, while the Jonny Lovato version reached number 99. Then, a week later, Dan Vasc's cover reached number 80. Finally the original version charted a week later, at number 38.

In 2020, Tesla, Inc. added “Toss a Coin” to the software in its cars, making it possible to replace the vehicle’s horn with the chorus.

== Charts ==
Chart (2020)	Peak position
Australia Digital Tracks (ARIA)	22
Hungary (Single Top 40)	9
New Zealand Hot Singles (RMNZ)	27
Scotland Singles (Official Charts)	27
UK Singles (Official Charts)	93

== Certifications ==
Region	Certification	Certified units/sales
Poland (ZPAV)	Gold	25,000^{‡}
^{‡} Sales+streaming figures based on certification alone.
