= Joey Batey =

English actor (born 1989)

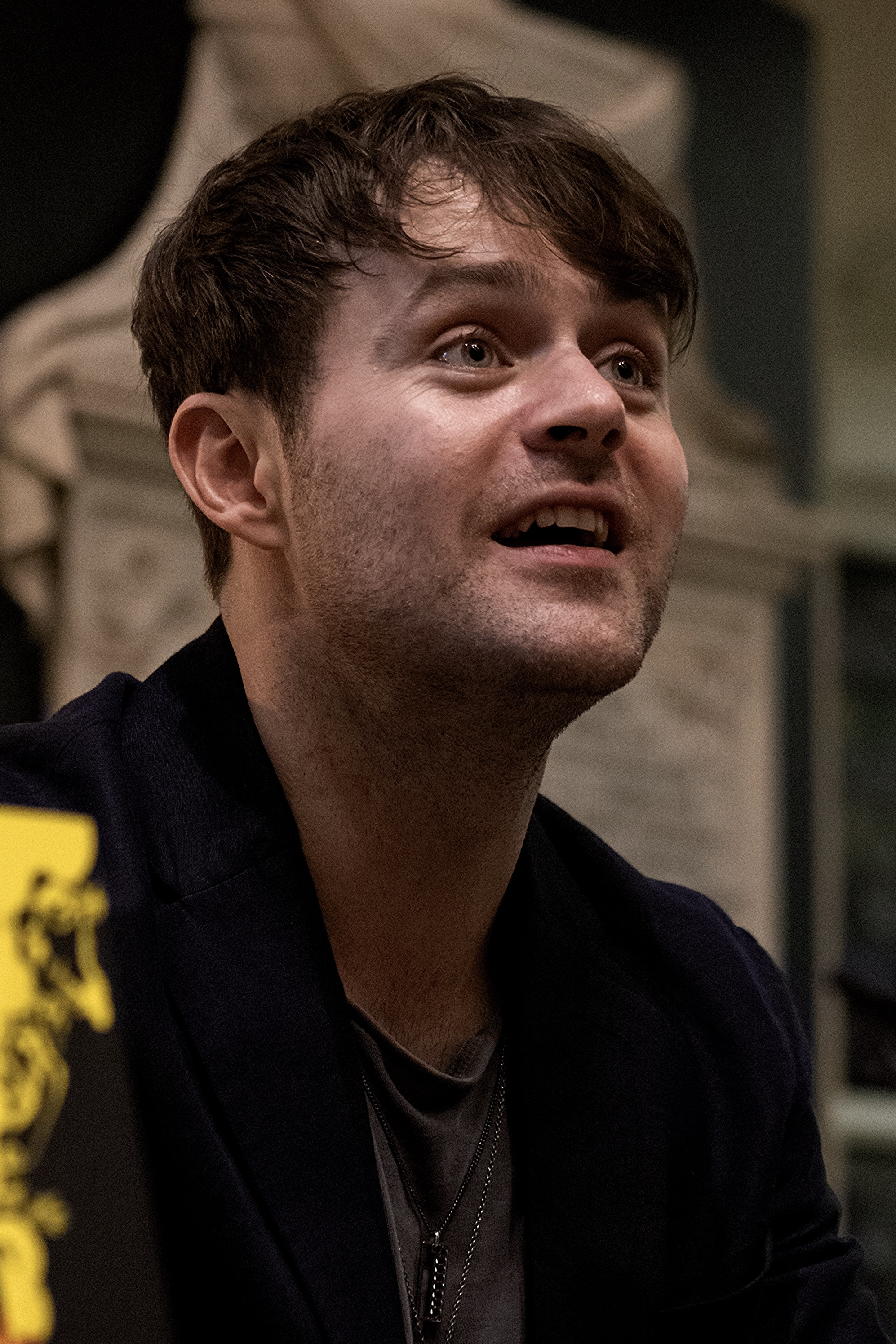
- Joey Batey Signing his Debut Novel 2025
- Born: 1989 (age 36–37); Newcastle upon Tyne, England
- Education: Robinson College, Cambridge; L'École Internationale de Théâtre Jacques Lecoq
- Occupations: Actor, musician
- Years active: 2008–present

Joey Batey (born 1989) is an English actor, musician, singer, songwriter and author. He portrays the bard Jaskier in the fantasy series The Witcher, where he sang "Toss a Coin to Your Witcher", as well as other songs featured in the series.

== Early life and education ==
Joey Batey was born in Newcastle upon Tyne. He has said he grew up in a "musical family" and has always been around music. He took a BA in Modern and Medieval Languages from Robinson College, Cambridge, then studied at L'École Internationale de Théâtre Jacques Lecoq. Whilst at Cambridge, he co-wrote and performed the comedic sketch show Good Clean Men with Alex Owen, Ben Ashenden and Simon Haines and he performed in a production of The Seagull alongside Haines, Lily Cole and Genevieve Gaunt.

== Career ==
Batey's film debut was in the 2013 British thriller, Murder on the Home Front, directed by Geoffrey Sax. In 2014, he appeared in The Riot Club directed by Lone Scherfig. In 2017, Paul McGuigan cast him as Eddie in Film Stars Don't Die in Liverpool. Batey also played in the British TV series Strike (2017), and In The Dark (2017). He appeared in the series Knightfall in 2017–2018, a 14th century period piece centered on the Knights Templar, where he played the role of Pierre, a spy after information on the Holy Grail.

Batey is a vocalist and musician for the indie folk band The Amazing Devil, as well as the primary writer and composer. He and collaborator Madeleine Hyland met while acting for the Royal Shakespeare Company and together they formed the band in 2015, producing what Batey has described as music that “sad people can listen to at train stations.” The band has released three albums including Love Run (2016), and The Horror and the Wild (2020). Their most recent album, Ruin, was released on 31 October 2021.

Since 2019, Batey has played the character of the bard, Jaskier, in Netflix's adaptation of The Witcher, based on the Polish novel series of the same name. Batey has performed the following songs featured in the series: "Toss a Coin to Your Witcher", "The Fishmonger's Daughter" and "Her Sweet Kiss", as well as "Burn Butcher Burn", "Whoreson Prison Blues" and "The Golden One".

Before his debut novel, It's Not A Cult, he stated he had been writing for 17 years. It's Not a Cult is described as a "darkly comic folk horror" and was released October 23, 2025 by Bloomsbury Publishing. The audiobook, read aloud by Batey, is currently only available in the United Kingdom. The illustrations featured in the book are made by Madeleine Hyland.

== Filmography ==
=== Film ===
Year	Title	Role	Notes
2014	The Riot Club	Eager Chap	
2016	Bloody Cakes	Colin Montcrawknox	Unreleased
2017	Film Stars Don't Die in Liverpool	Eddie	Uncredited
2025	The Witcher: Sirens of the Deep	Jaskier (voice)	

=== Television ===
Year	Title	Role	Notes
2013	Murder on the Home Front	Dixie	Television film
2013	The White Queen	Edward of Lancaster	2 episodes
2013	Whitechapel	Gavin Redman	2 episodes
2016	Mount Pleasant	Gopher	3 episodes
2017	In the Dark	Shelley	2 episodes
2017	Strike	Al Rokeby	2 episodes
2017–2018	Knightfall	Pierre	5 episodes
2018	Shakespeare & Hathaway: Private Investigators	Callum Ballimore	Series 1, episode 4: "This Rough Magic"
2018	Stan Lee's Lucky Man	Bobby Hayes	Series 3, episode 2: "Run Rabbit Run"
2019	The War of the Worlds	Henderson	Series 1, episode 1
2019–present	The Witcher	Jaskier	Main role
2022	The Witcher: Blood Origin	Jaskier	Guest role
2022	Billy The Kid	Patrick McCarty	2 episodes

=== Video games ===
Year	Title	Role	Notes
2016	Dragon Quest Heroes 2	Cesar	Voice
