= Dark Eyes (Half Moon Run album) =

Studio album by Half Moon Run
- Released: 27 March 2012
- Recorded: Autumn 2011
- Genre: Indie rock, indie folk, indie pop
- Length: 39:28 (Canadian release); 43:34 (International release)
- Label: Indica, Glassnote, Communion
- Producer: Half Moon Run, Daniel Lagacé and Nygel Asselin

Half Moon Run chronology
Dark Eyes (2012)	Sun Leads Me On (2015)

Singles from Dark Eyes
- 1. "Full Circle" Released: 2012; 2. "Call Me in the Afternoon" Released: 2013; 3. "She Wants to Know" Released: 2014

Dark Eyes is the debut studio album by the Canadian indie rock band Half Moon Run, released through Indica Records in Canada on March 27, 2012. Their debut single "Full Circle" reached number 29 on the Canadian rock/alternative chart in 2012. The track was also used on the 'Horizon' trailer for Assassin's Creed IV: Black Flag, shown during E3 2013. The album's second single "Call Me in the Afternoon" peaked at number 19 on the Canadian rock/alternative chart in 2013. In the United States, the album has sold 12,000 copies as of September 2015. The band also released a song entitled 'Unofferable' on the album's international release in July 2013.

Professional ratings
Review scores
Source	Rating
13Strings	4.5/5 stars
AllMusic	3.5/5 stars
Buzz Magazine	3.5/5 stars
Sputnikmusic	4/5 stars

== Track listing ==
All tracks are written by Half Moon Run, except "She Wants to Know" written with Jonathan M. Fox

Original Canadian release
No.	Title	Length
1.	"Full Circle"	3:02
2.	"Call Me in the Afternoon"	3:04
3.	"No More Losing the War"	3:57
4.	"She Wants to Know"	4:12
5.	"Need It"	3:26
6.	"Give Up"	3:51
7.	"Judgement"	3:05
8.	"Drug You"	3:48
9.	"Nerve"	3:17
10.	"Fire Escape"	2:54
11.	"21 Gun Salute"	4:52
Total length:		39:28

All tracks are written by Half Moon Run, except "She Wants to Know" written with Jonathan M. Fox and "Unofferable" written with Isaac Symonds.

International release
No.	Title	Length
1.	"Full Circle"	3:02
2.	"Call Me in the Afternoon"	3:04
3.	"No More Losing the War"	3:57
4.	"She Wants to Know"	4:12
5.	"Need It"	3:26
6.	"Give Up"	3:51
7.	"Judgement"	3:05
8.	"Unofferable"	4:06
9.	"Drug You"	3:48
10.	"Nerve"	3:17
11.	"Fire Escape"	2:54
12.	"21 Gun Salute"	4:52
Total length:		43:34

== Charts ==
Chart (2013)	Peak position
Canadian Albums (Billboard)	8
Belgian Albums (Ultratop Flanders)	119
Belgian Albums (Ultratop Wallonia)	186
Dutch Albums (Album Top 100)	48
French Albums (SNEP)	138
US Heatseekers Albums (Billboard)	12

== Personnel ==
=== Half Moon Run ===
- Devon Portielje
- Conner Molander
- Dylan Phillips

=== Additional musicians ===
- Thomas Chartré – cello on "Need It", "Give Up", and "21 Gun Salute"
- Brigitte Dajczer – violin on "Give Up"
- Tosca String Quartet – strings on "Unofferable"
- Babette Hayward – background vocals on "21 Gun Salute"

=== Production ===
- Daniel Lagacé – producer, engineer
- Nygel Asselin — engineer, producer
- Shawn Cole — engineer on "She Wants to Know"
- Jim Eno — producer and engineer on "Unofferable"
- Devon Portielje — engineer on "21 Gun Salute"
- Sean McLean Carrie — assistant engineer
- Scott Ord — assistant engineer
- Layne Frank — assistant engineer
- James Peter Watkins — assistant engineer
- Chris Russell — assistant engineer
- Chris Shaw — mixing
- Ruadhri Cushnan — mixing on "Full Circle" and "Unofferable"
- Ryan Morey — mastering
- Matthew Joycey — photography, concept, and art direction
- Yannick Turenne — props
- Peter Edwards — layout
