= Lindsay Deutsch =

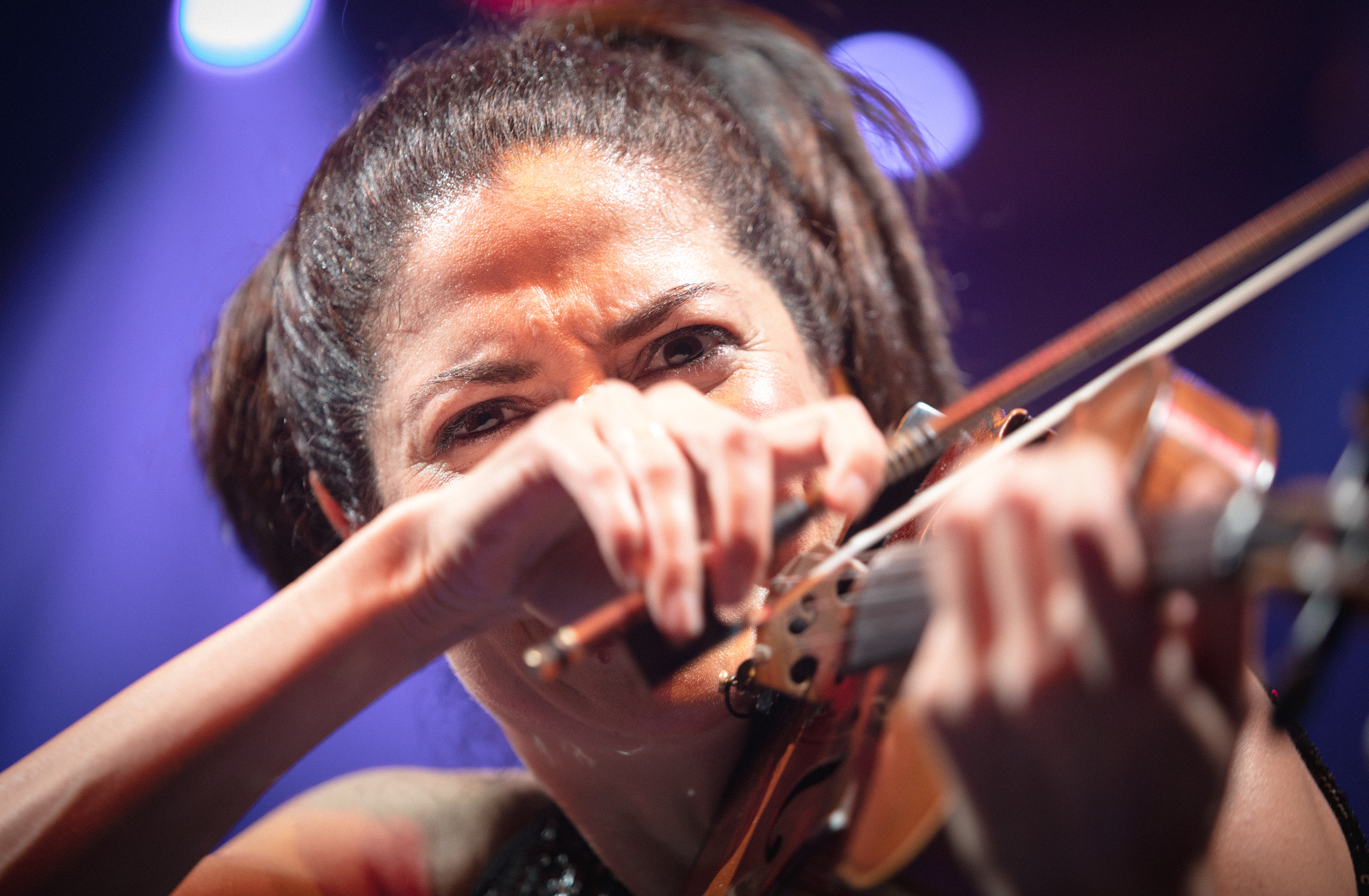
- Lindsay Deutsch in 2024

Background information
- Born: 28 November 1984 (age 41); Houston, Texas, US
- Genres: Classical; crossover
- Occupation: Musician
- Instrument: Violin
- Website: lindsaydeutsch.com

Lindsay Ann Deutsch (born November 28, 1984) is an American violinist. A native of Houston, Texas, Deutsch moved to Los Angeles at age fifteen to pursue her music career.

Deutsch made her solo debut at the age of 11 with the Clear Lake Symphony in Texas. She has since performed throughout North America with orchestras such as the Los Angeles Chamber Orchestra, Colorado Symphony Orchestra, Fort Worth Symphony, San Diego Symphony, Knoxville Symphony Orchestra, West Virginia Symphony Orchestra, Oakville Symphony Orchestra and the Brevard Symphony Orchestra among others.

As chamber musician, Deutsch has collaborated with artists such as Gil Shaham, Jeffrey Kahane, Adele Anthony, Cho-Liang Lin, Arnold Steinhardt, Kim Chee-yun, Nokuthula Ngwenyama, Alisa Weilerstein, Gary Hoffman, and the St. Lawrence String Quartet.

In 2018, Deutsch began touring with Yanni as a featured violinist during his Yanni 25 – Live At The Acropolis Anniversary Concert Tour, performing with him in Saudi Arabia and the United States. She also is a member of the crossover piano trio, TAKE3.

Deutsch can be heard as a featured artist on soundtracks such as The Good Shepherd starring Robert De Niro, and Netflix series One Piece and The Witcher.

In 2005, Deutsch received national attention when her 1742 Sanctus Seraphin violin, on loan from the Mandell Collection of Southern California, valued at $850,000, was stolen from her car. It was returned five days later after she offered a $10,000 reward.

In addition to her music, in her early years, Lindsay Deutsch won the gold medal in the World Junior Olympic Racquetball Championships in 1997 and was selected to the 2000 U.S Junior Olympic Racquetball Team.

Deutsch graduated from the Colburn School in Los Angeles where she studied with Robert Lipsett.
