= Marcin Patrzalek =

Polish guitarist (born 2000)

Marcin Patrzałek
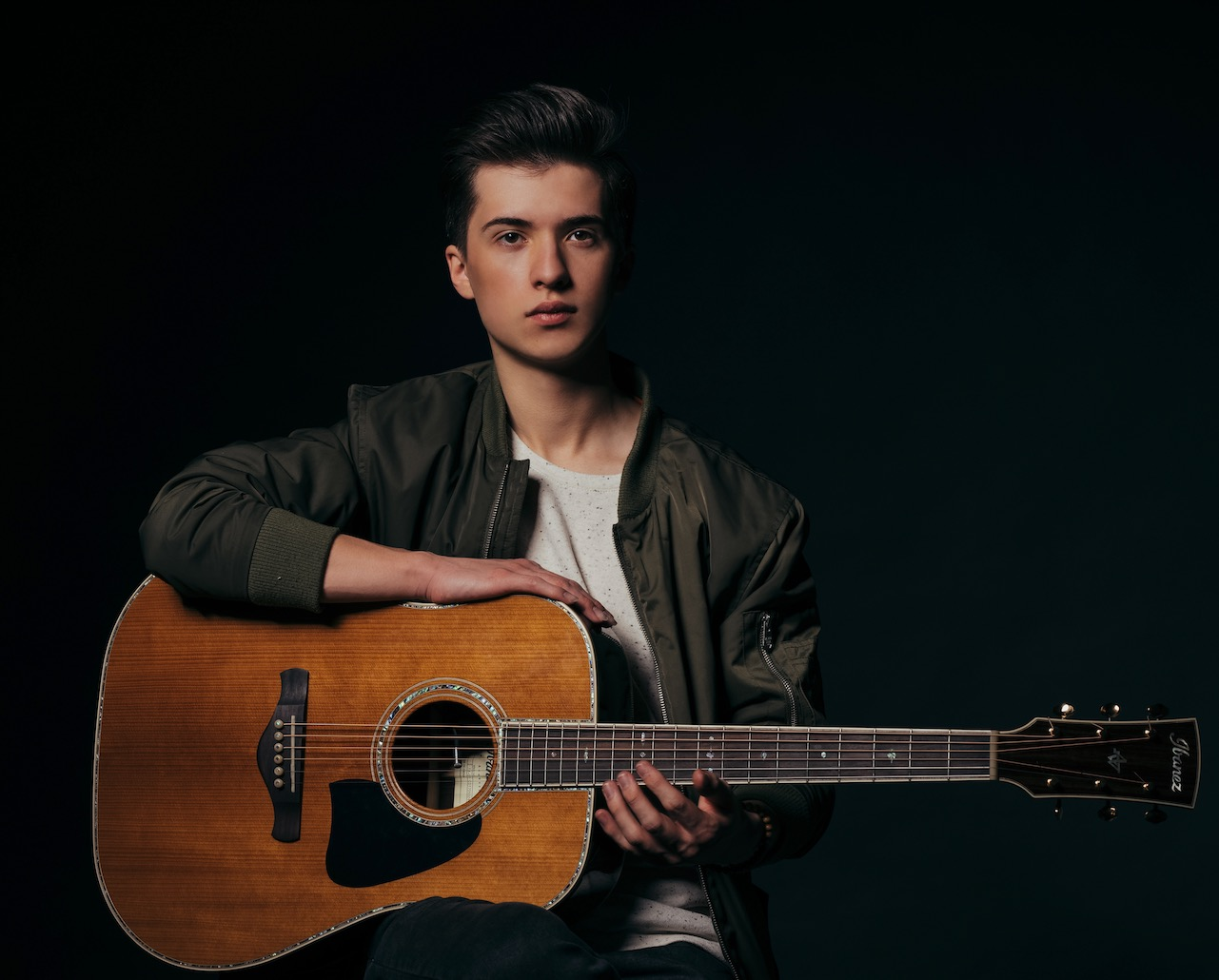

Background information
- Born: October 6, 2000 (age 26); Kielce, Poland
- Occupations: Musician, guitarist, arranger
- Instrument: Guitar
- Years active: 2015–present
- Label: Masterworks/SME Records
- Website: marcinofficial.com

Marcin Patrzałek (Polish pronunciation: [ˈmar.t͡ɕin patˈʂa.wɛk]; born October 6, 2000), known mononymously as Marcin, is a Polish percussive fingerstyle guitarist, composer, and producer. He is known for combining fingerstyle, percussive guitar techniques with modern electronic and orchestral production. He first gained popularity in 2015 after winning the ninth edition of Polish talent show Must Be The Music, the prize for which was 100,000 Polish złoty and an additional 100,000 złoty for promotion of his music on Polish radio station RMF FM. After local success, he went on to release his debut record HUSH, the release of which was accompanied by singles including Patrzalek's percussive arrangement of Isaac Albéniz's "Asturias"; the video of the arrangement was released through fingerstyle label CandyRat Records. In subsequent years, Patrzałek's popularity grew rapidly beyond Polish borders due to multiple viral releases online. His videos were posted and discussed by notable publishers such as Rolling Stone, Metal Hammer, Classic FM, Guitar World, Billboard as well as independently. Patrzalek's performances have amassed over 150 million views online, the main contributors to this number being his solo acoustic guitar arrangements of major classical pieces such as Beethoven's Moonlight Sonata and Symphony No. 5, as well as popular music, rock arrangements, and original compositions.

In 2018, Patrzałek became an official endorser of Ibanez acoustic guitars. At the end of the same year, he won the 5th edition of major Italian TV talent show Tu Si Que Vales, broadcast by Canale 5, receiving a standing ovation from the judges for the first time ever in the show. The prize for winning was €100,000. Later, he competed on America's Got Talent, which contributed to his popularity overseas, as well as produced multiple viral performances. Marcin's continued prolific output on Instagram and TikTok led to him being praised by guitar figures such as Tom Morello, Paul Stanley, Dweezil Zappa, Tosin Abasi, Vernon Reid. and Slash.

In early 2020, it was announced that Marcin signed an exclusive recording contract with Sony Music branch Sony Masterworks; two singles soon followed. In 2021 he started working on his major label debut album, released in 2024. In 2023, Marcin composed the flamenco theme of Mihawk's character for the One Piece Live Action.

== Career ==
=== 2010–2015: Career beginnings and Must Be The Music win ===
Patrzałek started playing the guitar at age 10 when he picked up classical guitar under the guidance of local teacher Jerzy Pikor. After two years he started studying flamenco techniques, being taught by Spanish guitarist Carlos Piñana. Later, at age 13, Patrzalek started playing fingerstyle on an acoustic guitar. It quickly became his main instrument and after around a year of self-taught practice in 2015 he won the ninth edition of Polish talent-show Must Be The Music. Around that time he started creating electronic music on his computer and combining it with guitar playing, which later resulted in the creation of his debut record, HUSH.

=== 2016–2018: Debut album, Tu Si Que Vales, Revamp EP ===
In 2016, at age 16, Patrzałek released his debut LP, HUSH. The album is composed of ten pieces: six original tracks (acoustic guitar with electronic and orchestral production elements), two arrangements and two electronic remixes. The album was released independently on October 7, 2016, with distribution in Poland by Polish label My Music. In the same year Patrzałek became a finalist in the International Fingerstyle Competition Guitar Masters and next year won first prize in the International Classical Guitar Joaquin Rodrigo Competition. In March 2018 it was announced that Patrzałek had become an official endorser of Ibanez guitars - he plays the AE900-NT model. Around this time he started gaining fame due to his solo guitar arrangement videos he posted on YouTube. His 2016 arrangement of "Toxicity" by System of a Down became his first video to amass tens of millions of views on YouTube and Facebook. Other endorsements such as Fishman and Elixir Strings were soon to follow.

In 2018 Marcin Patrzałek became the winner of a major talent show for the second time. He was victorious in the fifth edition of Tu Si Que Vales in Italy. During his audition, Patrzałek played his viral Beethoven's 5th Symphony arrangement and received four positive votes from the judges as well as 100% "yes" votes from the live studio audience; the judges gave Patrzałek a "golden buzzer" pass to the final. There he performed original arrangements of "Asturias" combined with "Innuendo" by Queen. Patrzalek competed against three other contestants in the final and won with over 50 percent of votes from the television audience.

On November 12, 2018, Patrzałek released his first EP titled revAMP, a compilation record of his most popular arrangements. Earlier in the year an original single was released titled "Baba Yaga".

=== 2019–present: America's Got Talent, record deal ===
After gaining more international recognition between his videos and talent show performances, Marcin toured multiple countries and continents in 2018 and 2019.

In 2019, he auditioned for season 14 of America's Got Talent. During the judge cuts round, he was one of seven acts that advanced to the live shows round but eventually eliminated at semi-finals. His performances broadened his audience and led to him signing an exclusive contract with Sony Masterworks, a division of Sony Music. So far, two singles were released under the imprint: "Moonlight Sonata," and "Snow Monkey". Both tracks were produced by Marcin and include additional modern electronic elements. The former quickly became one of Patrzałek's most popular releases, while the latter includes heavy reggaeton influences not characteristic of his previous work or of fingerstyle guitar in general. During the coronavirus pandemic, he gathered millions of followers on social media platforms Instagram and TikTok due to his increased activity.

In March 2022, Patrzałek was a special guest at a series of seven concerts at the Royal Albert Hall in London, as part of the Classical Spectacular show. Soon after, he released his first official collaboration on YouTube – a duet with Japanese guitarist Ichika Nito.

On September 13, 2024, Marcin's debut album, titled Dragon in Harmony, was released. The album features tracks with appearances from Portugal. The Man, Tim Henson of Polyphia, Delaney Bailey, and Ichika Nito.

== Albums ==
Year	Title
2016	Hush
2018	revAMP (EP)
2024	Dragon in Harmony
