= List of 2021 albums (January–June) =

The following is a list of albums, EPs, and mixtapes released in the first half of 2021. These albums are (1) original, i.e. excluding reissues, remasters, and compilations of previously released recordings, and (2) notable, defined as having received significant coverage from reliable sources independent of the subject.

For additional information about bands formed, reformed, disbanded, or on hiatus, for deaths of musicians, and for links to musical awards, see 2021 in music.

For information on albums released in the second half of 2021, see List of 2021 albums (July–December).

== First quarter ==
=== January ===
List of albums released in January 2021
Go to: January | February | March | April | May | June | Back to top
Release date	Artist	Album	Genre	Label	Ref.
January 1	Agallah Don Bishop	2021			
January 1	Anavitória	Cor	Folk-pop	Anavitória Artes	
January 1	Bun B and Le$	Distant		DIOS, II Trill Enterprises	
January 1	DJ Daddykat & Wiz Khalifa	#FUCC2020			
January 1	Eito	Sukkarakan		A.S.A.B	
January 1	R.A.P. Ferreira	Bob's Son: R.A.P. Ferreira in the Garden Level Cafe of the Scallops Hotel		Ruby Yacht	
January 1	That Handsome Devil	Your Parents Are Sellouts			
January 1	Uncle Murda	Don't Come Outside, Vol. 3			
January 4	Gudda Gudda	7 Slugs		YMCMB	
January 4	Steve Earle & The Dukes	J.T.		New West	
January 6	Greeeen	Bokutachi No Denkosekka		Zen Music	
January 6	Misako Uno	Sweet Hug		Avex Trax	
January 6	SixTones	1ST		SME Japan	
January 6	Spyair	Wadachi			
January 6	Yoasobi	The Book	J-pop	Sony Japan	
January 8	Aaron Watson	American Soul		Big Label Records	
January 8	Barry Gibb	Greenfields	Country	Capitol, EMI	
January 8	The Dirty Nil	Fuck Art	Alternative rock, punk rock, pop-punk	Dine Alone	
January 8	Jazmine Sullivan	Heaux Tales	Hip-hop, R&B	RCA	
January 8	Kev Brown & J Scienide	Stray from the Pack			
January 8	Mac Ayres	Magic 8ball		Dixon Court Records	
January 8	MCND	MCND Age		TOP Media	
January 8	Monica Ogah	Different			
January 8	Morgan Wallen	Dangerous: The Double Album	Country	Big Loud, Republic	
January 8	Passenger	Songs for the Drunk and Broken Hearted	Folk rock, indie folk	Black Crow Records	
January 8	Sammy Hagar and the Circle	Lockdown 2020	Hard rock	Mailboat	
January 8	Viagra Boys	Welfare Jazz	Art punk, experimental rock, post-punk	Year0001	
January 8	Wax Tailor	The Shadow of Their Suns			
January 10	Cookin' Soul	MF DOOM Tribute			
January 11	(G)I-dle	I Burn		Cube	
January 11	Sergio Vallín	Microsinfonías			
January 11	Treasure	The First Step: Treasure Effect	K-pop	YG	
January 11	Victon	Voice: The Future Is Now	K-pop	Play M	
January 12	K.A.A.N.	Long Time No See			
January 13	Band-Maid	Unseen World	Hard rock	Pony Canyon	
January 13	Boy George	Cool Karaoke Vol 1			
January 13	Danna Paola	K.O.	Latin pop	Universal Music Mexico	
January 13	Gatecreeper	An Unexpected Reality	Death metal	Closed Casket Activities	
January 13	Girls²	Japanese Star			
January 13	Go to the Beds	Reincarnation		Fueled By Mentaiko	
January 13	Kyuso Nekokami	Mormot Lab			
January 13	Pinegrove	Amperland, NY		Rough Trade	
January 15	Ashnikko	Demidevil	Pop	Warner	
January 15	Beach Bunny	Blame Game		Mom + Pop	
January 15	Beautify Junkyards	Cosmorama		Ghost Box	
January 15	Benjamin Ingrosso	En gång i tiden (del 1)	Pop	TEN	
January 15	Bloody Hammers	Songs of Unspeakable Terror	Horror punk, gothic rock	Napalm	
January 15	Buck Meek	Two Saviors	Indie rock, alt-country, folk	Keeled Scales	
January 15	Dale Crover	Rat-A-Tat-Tat!		Joyful Noise	
January 15	Daniel Knox	Won't You Take Me with You		H.P. Johnson Presents	
January 15	Devin Dawson	The Pink Slip		Warner Music Nashville	
January 15	Dragony	Viribus Unitis	Power metal, symphonic metal	Napalm	
January 15	Edenbridge	The Chronicles of Eden, Part 2			
January 15	Emma Ruth Rundle & Thou	The Helm of Sorrow		Sacred Bones	
January 15	Fickle Friends	Weird Years (Season 1)		Cooking Vinyl	
January 15	Frank Iero and the Future Violents	Heaven Is a Place, This Is a Place		UNFD	
January 15	Front Line Assembly	Mechanical Soul	Electro-industrial	Metropolis	
January 15	Illy	The Space Between		Sony Music Australia	
January 15	Ludovico Einaudi	Winds of Change			
January 15	Matthew Sweet	Catspaw	Indie pop	Omnivore	
January 15	Pearl Charles	Magic Mirror	Indie pop, indie rock	Kanine	
January 15	Shame	Drunk Tank Pink	Post-punk, art punk	Dead Oceans	
January 15	Sleaford Mods	Spare Ribs	Post-punk, rap rock	Rough Trade	
January 15	Why Don't We	The Good Times and the Bad Ones	Pop	Atlantic	
January 15	The Xcerts	So No One Told You Life Was Gonna Be This Way		Raygun Music	
January 15	You Me at Six	Suckapunch	Rock	Underdog Records, AWAL	
January 15	Zayn	Nobody Is Listening	Pop, R&B	RCA	
January 18	AB6IX	Salute: A New Hope		Brand New Music	
January 18	CJ Fly	The Way I H(ear) It, Vol. 1			
January 18	Epik High	Epik High Is Here	Hip-hop, alternative hip-hop	Ours Co.	
January 18	Kota the Friend	Lyrics to Go Vol. 2			
January 18	U-Know	Noir		SM	
January 19	Berry Good	Undying Love			
January 19	Cravity	Season 3. Hideout: Be Our Voice		Starship	
January 19	Oneus	Devil		RBW	
January 20	Baekhyun	Baekhyun	J-pop, R&B	Avex Trax	
January 20	Cherry Bullet	Cherry Rush	K-pop	FNC	
January 20	Da-ice	Six			
January 20	Deen	Pop in City ~For Covers Only~			
January 20	Hiroki Moriuchi	Sing;est		Universal Music Japan	
January 20	Hoppipolla	And Then There Was Us		Moss Music	
January 20	Little Glee Monster	Gradation			
January 20	Mameshiba no Taigun	Mamejor!		Avex Trax	
January 20	Tomorrow X Together	Still Dreaming	J-pop, dance	Big Hit, Republic	
January 20	Toshinori Yonekura	Green Giraffe		Tokuma Japan, Style72	
January 21	Flux Pavilion	.wav		Circus	
January 22	Anuel AA & Ozuna	Los Dioses	Reggaeton	Real Hasta la Muerte, Inc.	
January 22	Arca	Madre		XL	
January 22	Asphyx	Necroceros	Death-doom	Century Media	
January 22	Bicep	Isles	Electronic	Ninja Tune	
January 22	Bill Champlin	Livin' for Love		Imagen	
January 22	Biosphere	Angel's Flight		AD 93	
January 22	Brandon Lake	House of Miracles (Live)	Contemporary worship	Bethel Music	
January 22	Carm	Carm	Experimental	37d03d	
January 22	Caroline Shaw	Narrow Sea		Nonesuch	
January 22	The Dead Daisies	Holy Ground		Spitfire Music, SPV GmbH	
January 22	Ektomorf	Reborn		Napalm	
January 22	Erick the Architect	Future Proof		Glorious Dead Recordings	
January 22	James Yorkston and the Second Hand Orchestra	The Wide, Wide River	Folk	Domino	
January 22	Jarryd James	P.M.		Dryden Street	
January 22	Jason Bieler and The Baron Von Bielski Orchestra	Songs for the Apocalypse		Frontiers	
January 22	Jeremiah Fraites	Piano Piano		Decca	
January 22	Kiwi Jr.	Cooler Returns	Indie rock, jangle pop, slacker rock	Sub Pop	
January 22	Labyrinth	Welcome to the Absurd Circus	Power metal, progressive metal	Frontiers	
January 22	Lil Skies	Unbothered		All We Got Entertainment, Atlantic	
January 22	Lonely the Brave	The Hope List		Easy Life Records	
January 22	Madeline Kenney	Summer Quarter		Carpark	
January 22	Maggie Lindemann	Paranoia		Caroline	
January 22	Mason Lindahl	Kissing Rosy in the Rain		Tompkins Square	
January 22	Melim	Amores E Flores		Capitol	
January 22	Moon Taxi	Silver Dream		BMG	
January 22	Nervosa	Perpetual Chaos		Napalm	
January 22	Palberta	Palberta5000	Noise-punk	Wharf Cat Records	
January 22	Peewee Longway & Cassius Jay	Longway Sinatra 2		Empire	
January 22	Rhye	Home		Loma Vista	
January 22	RuPaul	RuPaul in London		RuCo Inc.	
January 22	Steve Aoki	6OKI - Rave Royale			
January 22	Steve Hackett	Under a Mediterranean Sky	Acoustic	Inside Out	
January 22	Still Corners	The Last Exit	Dream pop	Wrecking Light Records	
January 22	Tebey	The Good Ones		Jayward Artist Group, The Orchard, Sony Music	
January 22	Th1rt3en & Pharoahe Monch	A Magnificent Day for an Exorcism	Rap rock		
January 22	Therion	Leviathan		Nuclear Blast	
January 22	Typhoon	Sympathetic Magic		Roll Call	
January 22	Wardruna	Kvitravn	Nordic folk	Norse Music	
January 22	Widowspeak	Honeychurch		Captured Tracks	
January 22	Wig Wam	Never Say Die	Glam metal, hard rock	Frontiers	
January 22	Witch Egg	Witch Egg		Rock Is Hell Records	
January 23	Ewigkeit	Depopulate	Melodic death metal	Death to Music	
January 25	Bobby	Lucky Man			
January 25	Chiharu Matsuyama	Hikigatari Live			
January 25	Colde	Idealism			
January 25	Golden Child	Yes.	K-pop	Woollim	
January 26	Dreamcatcher	Dystopia: Road to Utopia	Hip-hop, nu metal, rock	Dreamcatcher	
January 27	Asca	Hyakkiyakou		Sacra Music	
January 27	Boys and Men	Boymen the Universe			
January 27	Jake Hoot	Love Out Of Time			
January 27	The Magician	Magic Tape 100		Potion Records	
January 27	Mica Levi	Blue Alibi		Mica Levi	
January 27	Nobuhiko Okamoto	Chaosix			
January 27	Predia	10ct			
January 27	Ryo Nishikido	Note			
January 27	Super Junior	Star		Avex Trax	
January 27	Yorushika	Sōsaku			
January 28	The Alchemist	Carry the Fire			
January 28	Car, the Garden	Absence			
January 28	Hyuna	I'm Not Cool		P Nation	
January 28	Maluma	#7DJ (7 Días En Jamaica)	Reggaeton		
January 29	Accept	Too Mean to Die		Nuclear Blast	
January 29	Anna B Savage	A Common Turn		City Slang	
January 29	Ani DiFranco	Revolutionary Love	Indie folk, jazz	Righteous Babe	
January 29	Annisokay	Aurora	Metalcore	Arising Empire	
January 29	Arlo Parks	Collapsed in Sunbeams		Transgressive	
January 29	Baio	Dead Hand Control		Glassnote	
January 29	The Besnard Lakes	The Besnard Lakes Are the Last of the Great Thunderstorm Warnings		Full Time Hobby	
January 29	Black Pistol Fire	Look Alive		Black Hill Records	
January 29	The Body	I've Seen All I Need to See	Power electronics	Thrill Jockey	
January 29	Buke and Gase & So Percussion	A Record Of...		Brassland	
January 29	Buzzy Lee	Spoiled Love		Future Classic	
January 29	Celeste	Not Your Muse	R&B	Polydor	
January 29	Chip	Snakes & Ladders		Cash Motto	
January 29	Chris Garneau	The Kind		The Orchard	
January 29	Crystal Viper	The Cult		Listenable	
January 29	Delvon Lamarr Organ Trio	I Told You So		Colemine Records	
January 29	Fredo	Money Can't Buy Happiness		Since '93	
January 29	Goat Girl	On All Fours		Rough Trade	
January 29	Tha God Fahim & Your Old Droog	Tha Wolf on Wall St.		Mongoloid Banks	
January 29	Helena Paparizou	Apohrosis		Minos EMI	
January 29	Joe Lovano's Trio Tapestry	Garden of Expression		ECM	
January 29	Keaton Henson	Supernova — Original Motion Picture Soundtrack		Lakeshore Records	
January 29	Langhorne Slim	Strawberry Mansion		Dualtone	
January 29	Lia Ices	Family Album		Natural Music	
January 29	LNZNDRF	II			
January 29	Lucero	When You Found Me		Liberty & Lament, Thirty Tigers	
January 29	The Luka State	Fall In Fall Out	Indie rock	Shelter, BMG	
January 29	Madlib	Sound Ancestors	Boom bap	Madlib Invazion	
January 29	Martin Gore	The Third Chimpanzee	Electronic	Mute	
January 29	Michael Schenker Group	Immortal		Nuclear Blast	
January 29	Minotaur Shock	Qi		Bytes	
January 29	Needlepoint	Walking Up That Valley		Stickman Records	
January 29	The Notwist	Vertigo Days	Electronic	Morr Music	
January 29	Portrayal of Guilt	We Are Always Alone		Closed Casket Activities	
January 29	PrettyMuch	Smackables		Sire	
January 29	Remedy Drive	Imago Amor	Christian rock		
January 29	Rich the Kid	Lucky 7			
January 29	Rome	Parlez-Vous Hate?	Neofolk	Trisol	
January 29	Soen	Imperial	Progressive metal, progressive rock	Silver Lining Music	
January 29	Steven Wilson	The Future Bites		Caroline International	
January 29	Tribulation	Where the Gloom Becomes Sound		Century Media, Metal Blade	
January 29	Weezer	OK Human	Orchestral pop, baroque pop, pop rock	Atlantic	
January 29	William Parker	Migration of Silence Into and Out of the Tone World		Centering, AUM Fidelity	
January 29	Yasmin Williams	Urban Driftwood	Folk, country	Spinster Sounds	
January 31	Papoose	January		Honorable Records	

=== February ===
List of albums released in February 2021
Go to: January | February | March | April | May | June | Back to top
Release date	Artist	Album	Genre	Label	Ref.
February 1	Lego	Lego White Noise	Musique concrète, white noise, experimental	West One	
February 2	Capicua	Encore			
February 2	CIX	Hello Chapter Ø: Hello, Strange Dream		C9	
February 2	Youra	Gaussian			
February 3	Aina the End	The End		Avex Trax	
February 3	Keina Suda	Billow			
February 3	Megumi Nakajima	Green Diary			
February 3	Sung Si-kyung	You Can Change My Life			
February 3	Super Beaver	I Love You		Sony Music Japan	
February 3	The Yellow Monkey	Live Loud			
February 4	Aurora	For the Humans Who Take Long Walks in the Forest			
February 4	Babylon	Hardy			
February 4	Dark Time Sunshine	Lore		Fake Four	
February 4	Joeboy	Somewhere Between Beauty & Magic	Afro pop, Afroswing	Banku, emPawa Africa	
February 4	The KLF	Come Down Dawn	Ambient house, chill-out	KLF Communications	
February 4	Vampire Weekend	40:42			
February 5	Aaron Lee Tasjan	Tasjan! Tasjan! Tasjan!		New West	
February 5	Angelus Apatrida	Angelus Apatrida		Century Media	
February 5	Apollo LTD	Nothing Is Ordinary, Everything Is Beautiful		Residence Music, Centricity	
February 5	Archie Shepp and Jason Moran	Let My People Go	Jazz	Archieball	
February 5	Black Coffee	Subconsciously	Funk, electronic, dance	Soulstic Music	
February 5	Black Country, New Road	For the First Time	Experimental rock	Ninja Tune	
February 5	CNCO	Déjà Vu	Latin pop, bachata, reggaeton	Sony Music Latin	
February 5	Conway & Big Ghost Ltd.	If It Bleeds It Can Be Killed		Drumwork Music	
February 5	Cristian Vogel	Rebirth of Wonky		Endless Process	
February 5	Cult of Luna	The Raging River		Red Creek Recordings	
February 5	David Nance	Duty Now for the Future	Roots rock		
February 5	Deacon Blue	Riding on the Tide of Love		earMUSIC	
February 5	Devin the Dude	Soulful Distance			
February 5	Femi Kuti & Made Kuti	Legacy+	Afrobeat	Partisan	
February 5	Foo Fighters	Medicine at Midnight	Alternative rock	RCA, Roswell	
February 5	Hayley Williams	Flowers for Vases / Descansos	Folk, country folk	Atlantic	
February 5	Imani Winds	Bruits		Bright Shiny Things	
February 5	Jane Birkin	Oh! Pardon tu dormais...		Verve	
February 5	Jeremy Zucker & Chelsea Cutler	Brent II			
February 5	John Carpenter	Lost Themes III: Alive After Death		Sacred Bones	
February 5	Kate Ceberano	Sweet Inspiration		Sony Music Australia	
February 5	Korpiklaani	Jylhä	Folk metal	Nuclear Blast	
February 5	Lingua Ignota	Agnus Dei			
February 5	Los Legendarios and Wisin	Los Legendarios 001		La Base Music Group, WK Records	
February 5	Matt Heafy	Ascendancy			
February 5	Mexican Institute of Sound	Distrito Federal			
February 5	Octo Octa	She's Calling		T4T LUV NRG	
February 5	Odette	Herald	Electronic	EMI Music Australia	
February 5	Ploho	Phantom Feelings		Artoffact Records	
February 5	Pooh Shiesty	Shiesty Season	Southern hip-hop	1017, Atlantic	
February 5	Product of Hate	You Brought This War		POH Metalworks	
February 5	Psychedelic Porn Crumpets	Shyga! The Sunlight Mound	Psychedelic rock	Marathon Artists, What Reality? Records	
February 5	Rick Margitza	Sacred Hearts	Jazz	Le Coq Records	
February 5	The Ruins of Beverast	The Thule Grimoires		Ván	
February 5	Ryley Walker & Kikagaku Moyo	Deep Fried Grandeur	Psychedelia, krautrock	Husky Pants Records	
February 5	Shovels & Rope	Busted Jukebox, Volume 3			
February 5	Smith & Thell	Pixie's Parasol			
February 5	The Staves	Good Woman		Atlantic UK, Nonesuch	
February 5	Sturle Dagsland	Sturle Dagsland			
February 5	The Telescopes	Songs of Love and Revolution	Shoegaze, dream pop, noise rock	Tapete	
February 5	Thurston Moore	Screen Time	Alternative rock, experimental rock		
February 5	Todd La Torre	Rejoice in the Suffering	Heavy metal	Rat Pak Records	
February 5	Torben Ulrich & Lori Goldston	Oakland moments: cello, voice, reuniting (rejoicing)			
February 5	Transatlantic	The Absolute Universe	Progressive rock	Inside Out	
February 5	TV Priest	Uppers	Post-punk	Hand in Hive, Sub Pop	
February 5	VanJess	Homegrown		Keep Cool, RCA	
February 5	Walking Papers	The Light Below		Carry On Music	
February 5	The Weather Station	Ignorance		Fat Possum	
February 5	The Weeknd	The Highlights	Alternative R&B	XO, Republic	
February 7	Loathe	The Things They Believe	Ambient	SharpTone	
February 8	Kim Woo-seok	2nd Desire (Tasty)		TOP	
February 10	Man with a Mission	One Wish e.p.			
February 10	Marlon Craft	How We Intended			
February 10	Sekai no Owari	Sekai no Owari 2010–2019		Toy's Factory	
February 10	Smokepurpp	Psycho (Legally Insane)		Alamo Records	
February 10	Zutomayo	Gusare		EMI Japan	
February 12	Abiotic	Ikigai	Deathcore	The Artisan Era	
February 12	Ablaze My Sorrow	Among Ashes and Monoliths	Melodic death metal	Black Lion Records	
February 12	Aborym	Hostile		Dead Seed Productions	
February 12	Arlissa	The Lovers		BigBootyRecords	
February 12	Bodies of Water	Is This What It's Like		Thousand Tongues	
February 12	Clap Your Hands Say Yeah	New Fragility	Indie rock	Secretly Canadian	
February 12	Claud	Super Monster	Bedroom pop	Saddest Factory, Dead Oceans	
February 12	Death by Unga Bunga	Heavy Male Insecurity		Jansen Records	
February 12	Django Django	Glowing in the Dark	Electronic rock	Because Music	
February 12	Dominique Fils-Aimé	Three Little Words		Ensoul Records	
February 12	Emile Mosseri	Minari (Original Motion Picture Soundtrack)		Milan	
February 12	Durbin	The Beast Awakens		Frontiers	
February 12	Jeremy Pelt	Griot - This Is Important!	Jazz	HighNote	
February 12	Florida Georgia Line	Life Rolls On	Country	BMLG	
February 12	God Is an Astronaut	Ghost Tapes #10	Post-rock	Napalm	
February 12	Heligoland	This Quiet Fire			
February 12	Inglorious	We Will Ride			
February 12	Jillette Johnson	It's a Beautiful Day and I Love You			
February 12	Joel Hoekstra's 13	Running Games			
February 12	Jon Foreman	Departures		RE:THINK	
February 12	JPEGMafia	EP2!	Alternative R&B, alternative hip-hop	Republic	
February 12	Karen Matheson	Still Time	Folk rock	Vertical	
February 12	Love and Death	Perfectly Preserved		Earache	
February 12	Luca Brasi	Everything is Tenuous		Cooking Vinyl Australia	
February 12	Lucky Daye	Table for Two		Keep Cool, RCA	
February 12	Margaret	Maggie Vision	Hip-hop, urban pop	Gaja Hornby, Sony Poland	
February 12	Mod Sun	Internet Killed the Rockstar		Big Noise	
February 12	Møme & Ricky Ducati	Flashback FM			
February 12	The Obsessives	Monastery		Memory Music	
February 12	Pale Waves	Who Am I?		Dirty Hit	
February 12	Paul Leary	Born Stupid		Shimmy Disc, Joyful Noise	
February 12	Pentatonix	The Lucky Ones		RCA	
February 12	Pink Sweats	Pink Planet		Atlantic	
February 12	The Pretty Reckless	Death by Rock and Roll		Fearless	
February 12	Rita Ora & Imanbek	Bang		Asylum, Atlantic	
February 12	Robin Thicke	On Earth, and in Heaven	R&B	Lucky Music, Empire	
February 12	The Rubens	0202		Ivy League	
February 12	Sia	Music – Songs from and Inspired by the Motion Picture	Pop	Monkey Puzzle Records, Atlantic	
February 12	Sirenia	Riddles, Ruins & Revelations		Napalm	
February 12	Slowthai	Tyron	British hip-hop, grime	Method Records	
February 12	Small Sins	Volume II			
February 12	Teenage Wrist	Earth Is a Black Hole	Alternative rock, grunge, shoegaze	Epitaph	
February 12	Various artists	Judas and the Black Messiah: The Inspired Album		RCA	
February 14	Black Dresses	Forever in Your Heart	Electronic, digital hardcore	Blacksquares Records	
February 14	Maliq & D'Essentials	Raya			
February 14	Plutónio	Ao Vivo No Coliseu			
February 14	Yungblud	A Weird! AF Valentine's Day		Geffen	
February 15	Chungha	Querencia	Pop	MNH	
February 15	Pom Poko	Cheater	Indie rock, noise pop	Bella Union	
February 16	Animal Collective	Crestone (Original Score)		Domino Soundtracks	
February 17	Hizaki	Rusalka	Symphonic metal, power metal	Zeno Records Japan	
February 17	NCT 127	Loveholic	J-pop	Avex Trax	
February 19	Anya Marina	Live and Alone in New York			
February 19	Bodega Bamz	El Camino		100 Keep It	
February 19	Carly Pearce	29	Country	Big Machine	
February 19	Cassandra Jenkins	An Overview on Phenomenal Nature		Ba Da Bing	
February 19	CJ	Loyalty Over Royalty		Warner	
February 19	David Gray	Skellig	Irish folk music	Laugh a Minute, AWAL	
February 19	Detritus	Myths			
February 19	Edie Brickell & New Bohemians	Hunter and the Dog Star		Thirty Tigers	
February 19	Ghetts	Conflict of Interest		Warner	
February 19	Gloc-9	Poot at Pag-ibig			
February 19	Tha God Fahim & Your Old Droog	Tha YOD Fahim			
February 19	Hand Habits	Dirt		Saddle Creek	
February 19	Harakiri for the Sky	Mære		Art of Propaganda	
February 19	The Hold Steady	Open Door Policy	Rock	Frenchkiss	
February 19	Icon for Hire	Amorphous		Kartel Music Group	
February 19	I.M	Duality	Trap	Starship	
February 19	Indigo Sparke	Echo		Sacred Bones	
February 19	Isaac Dunbar	Evil Twin			
February 19	Jess Moskaluke	The Demos	Country	MDM	
February 19	Jim Jones & Harry Fraud	The Fraud Department		The Fraud Department, Empire	
February 19	Kelly Rowland	K		Kelly Rowland	
February 19	Kevin Gates	Only the Generals, Pt. II	Hip-hop, trap	Bread Winners Association, Atlantic	
February 19	Kid Congo and the Pink Monkey Birds	Swing from the Sean Delear		In the Red	
February 19	Krokus	Adios Amigos Live @ Wacken			
February 19	Lake of Tears	Ominous		AFM	
February 19	Lil Zay Osama	Trench Baby		Warner	
February 19	Mika	À l'Opéra Royal de Versailles		Republic	
February 19	Mogwai	As the Love Continues	Post-rock	Rock Action, Temporary Residence Limited	
February 19	Mr Eazi	Something Else	Afropop	Banku Music, emPawa Africa	
February 19	Nothing,Nowhere	Trauma Factory	Indie rock	Fueled by Ramen	
February 19	Pauline Anna Strom	Angel Tears in Sunlight		RVNG Intl.	
February 19	Ricky Warwick	When Life Was Hard and Fast		Nuclear Blast	
February 19	Roscoe Mitchell & Mike Reed	The Ritual and the Dance		Astral Spirits	
February 19	Senyawa	Alkisah		Phantom Limb	
February 19	SG Lewis	Times	Disco, dance-pop, house	Virgin EMI, PMR	
February 19	Tash Sultana	Terra Firma		Lonely Lands Records, Sony Music Australia	
February 19	Teen Daze	Breathing Tides			
February 19	Temperance	Melodies of Green and Blue			
February 19	Tindersticks	Distractions		City Slang	
February 19	Whitesnake	The Blues Album	Hard rock, blues rock	Rhino	
February 19	Wild Pink	A Billion Little Lights		Royal Mountain	
February 19	Wizard	Metal in My Head		Massacre	
February 21	Wet Bed Gang	Ngana Zambi			
February 22	Ævangelist	Dream an Evil Dream III		Dead Seed Productions	
February 22	Fred the Godson	Ascension		R1CMG	
February 22	Shinee	Don't Call Me	K-pop	SM	
February 23	Drakeo the Ruler	The Truth Hurts			
February 23	Parannoul	To See the Next Part of the Dream	Shoegaze		
February 24	Necronomidol	Vämjelseriter		Imperiet IV	
February 24	WEi	Identity: Challenge		Kakao M	
February 24	Dish	X			
February 25	The Alarm	War			
February 25	Nick Cave & Warren Ellis	Carnage		Goliath Records	
February 26	Adrian Younge	The American Negro	R&B	Jazz Is Dead	
February 26	Alice Cooper	Detroit Stories	Hard rock, blues rock	earMUSIC	
February 26	Altın Gün	Yol		ATO	
February 26	Architects	For Those That Wish to Exist	Alternative metal, metalcore	Epitaph, UNFD	
February 26	Balthazar	Sand		PIAS	
February 26	Blanck Mass	In Ferneaux		Sacred Bones	
February 26	Bonnie Tyler	The Best Is Yet to Come		earMUSIC	
February 26	C. Tangana	El Madrileño	Folk, alternative R&B	Sony Spain	
February 26	Casey Veggies	CG5		Jazz is Dead	
February 26	Cloud Nothings	The Shadow I Remember		Carpark	
February 26	Currensy	Collection Agency		Jet Life Recordings	
February 26	Danny L Harle	Harlecore		Mad Decent	
February 26	Dax Pierson	Nerve Bumps (A Queer Divine Dissatisfaction)		Ratskin, Dark Entries	
February 26	Deap Vally	Digital Dream		Cooking Vinyl	
February 26	Digga D	Made in the Pyrex	British hip-hop, UK drill	CGM Records	
February 26	DJ Muggs & Rome Streetz	Death & the Magician		Soul Assassins Records	
February 26	Einherjer	North Star			
February 26	Empyrium	Über den Sternen		Dead Seed Productions	
February 26	Epica	Omega	Symphonic metal	Nuclear Blast	
February 26	Evergrey	Escape of the Phoenix		AFM	
February 26	Frànçois and The Atlas Mountains	Banane Bleue		Domino	
February 26	Glitterer	Life Is Not a Lesson	Shoegaze, grunge, hardcore punk	Anti-	
February 26	Helstar	Clad in Black		Massacre	
February 26	James Johnston and Steve Gullick	We Travel Time	Noise, folk, classical	God Unknown Records	
February 26	James Newton Howard	Raya and the Last Dragon (Original Motion Picture Soundtrack)			
February 26	Jimmy Edgar	Cheetah Bend		Innovative Leisure	
February 26	Joanna Connor	4801 South Indiana Avenue	Chicago blues	Keeping The Blues Alive	
February 26	Joe Chambers	Samba de Maracatu		Blue Note	
February 26	Julien Baker	Little Oblivions	Indie rock	Matador	
February 26	King Gizzard & the Lizard Wizard	L.W.	Psychedelic rock, progressive rock, funk	Flightless	
February 26	Kreator	Under the Guillotine		Noise	
February 26	Lucy Spraggan	Choices		Cooking Vinyl	
February 26	Lydia Luce	Dark River			
February 26	Madison Beer	Life Support	Pop, R&B	Epic	
February 26	Maxïmo Park	Nature Always Wins	Indie rock	Prolifica Records	
February 26	Melvins	Working with God	Sludge metal, noise rock	Ipecac	
February 26	Menahan Street Band	The Exciting Sounds of Menahan Street Band	Funk, soul	Daptone	
February 26	Moonspell	Hermitage	Gothic metal, progressive metal, hard rock	Napalm	
February 26	Mouse on Mars	AAI		Thrill Jockey	
February 26	Neil Young and Crazy Horse	Way Down in the Rust Bucket	Hard rock	Reprise	
February 26	NOFX	Single Album	Punk rock	Fat Wreck Chords	
February 26	Of Mice & Men	Timeless	Metalcore, post-hardcore	SharpTone	
February 26	Payroll Giovanni & Cardo	Another Day Another Dollar			
February 26	Richard Barbieri	Under a Spell		Kscope	
February 26	Robin Schulz	IIII		Warner	
February 26	Roosevelt	Polydans	Techno, R&B	City Slang, Greco-Roman Music	
February 26	Sam Dew	Moonlit Fools			
February 26	Sam Smith	Live		Universal	
February 26	Sheppard	Kaleidoscope Eyes		Empire of Song	
February 26	Shordie Shordie & Murda Beatz	Memory Lane		Warner	
February 26	Slowly Slowly	Race Car Blues Chapter Two		UNFD	
February 26	Smerz	Believer	Electronic, art pop	XL	
February 26	Stereolab	Electrically Possessed		Duophonic	
February 26	Steve Lukather	I Found the Sun Again		The Players Club	
February 26	Willie Nelson	That's Life	Traditional pop, jazz	Legacy	
February 26	A Winged Victory for the Sullen	Invisible Cities		Ninja Tune	
February 26	Wonho	Love Synonym Pt.2: Right for Us	K-pop, R&B, EDM	Highline	
February 26	Zemfira	Borderline			

=== March ===
List of albums released in March 2021
Go to: January | February | March | April | May | June | Back to top
Release date	Artist	Album	Genre	Label	Ref.
March 1	Ateez	Zero: Fever Part.2	K-pop	KQ Entertainment	
March 1	BbyMutha	Muthaleficent 2			
March 3	Aiko	Doushitatte Tsutaerarenaikara			
March 3	Sakurako Ohara	I			
March 3	Sumika	Amusic			
March 5	Adult Mom	Driver	Bedroom pop	Epitaph	
March 5	Alex Bleeker	Heaven on the Faultline			
March 5	Arab Strap	As Days Get Dark	Alternative rock	Rock Action	
March 5	Baest	Necro Sapiens		Century Media	
March 5	Barbarossa	Love Here Listen		Memphis Industries	
March 5	Brand of Sacrifice	Lifeblood			
March 5	Camilo	Mis Manos	Latin pop, reggaeton	Sony Music Latin	
March 5	Charlotte Lawrence	Charlotte		Atlantic	
March 5	Chase Atlantic	Beauty in Death		Fearless	
March 5	Chevelle	NIRATIAS	Alternative metal, hard rock, alternative rock	Epic	
March 5	A Day to Remember	You're Welcome		Fueled by Ramen	
March 5	Demon Hunter	Songs of Death and Resurrection	Acoustic rock	Solid State	
March 5	Denzel Curry and Kenny Beats	Unlocked 1.5	Hip-hop	Loma Vista	
March 5	DMA's	Live at Brixton		I Oh You	
March 5	Drake	Scary Hours 2	Hip-hop	OVO Sound	
March 5	Elizabeth & the Catapult	sincerely, e		Compass	
March 5	Fruit Bats	The Pet Parade		Merge	
March 5	Gabrielle	Do It Again	Pop, R&B	BMG	
March 5	Genesis Owusu	Smiling with No Teeth		Ourness	
March 5	Ian Sweet	Show Me How You Disappear		Polyvinyl	
March 5	Iron Man	Hail to the Riff			
March 5	Isak Danielson	Tomorrow Never Came			
March 5	Jane Weaver	Flock	Pop	Fire	
March 5	Jay Gonzalez	Back to the Hive		Middlebrow Records	
March 5	Jimbo Mathus & Andrew Bird	These 13	Americana	Thirty Tigers	
March 5	Judith Hill	Baby, I'm Hollywood!			
March 5	Ken Hensley	My Book of Answers		Cherry Red	
March 5	Kings of Leon	When You See Yourself	Alternative rock, rock	RCA	
March 5	Maria Arnal i Marcel Bagés	Clamor		Fina Estampa	
March 5	The Microphones	Foghorn Tape		P. W. Elverum & Sun	
March 5	Mr. Mitch	Lazy		Gobstopper Records	
March 5	of Montreal	I Feel Safe with You, Trash		of Montreal	
March 5	Only the Family	Loyal Bros	Drill	Only the Family, Empire	
March 5	Pat Metheny	Road to the Sun	Classical crossover, chamber jazz, chamber music	Modern Recordings	
March 5	Postdata	Twin Flames		Paper Bag	
March 5	Quinn XCII	Change of Scenery II		Columbia	
March 5	Ron Gallo	Peacemeal			
March 5	The Spill Canvas	Conduit		Pure Noise	
March 5	Sun June	Somewhere	Dream pop	Run for Cover	
March 5	Tigers Jaw	I Won't Care How You Remember Me	Indie rock, emo	Hopeless	
March 5	Tobacco	Fucked Up Friends 3		Rad Cult	
March 5	Tory Lanez	Playboy		One Umbrella Records	
March 5	Various artists	Coming 2 America (Original Motion Picture Soundtrack)		Def Jam	
March 5	Worriers	The Old Friends			
March 5	Zara Larsson	Poster Girl		TEN, Epic	
March 9	Hikaru Utada	One Last Kiss	J-pop	Epic, Sony Music Japan	
March 9	Youth Code & King Yosef	A Skeleton Key in the Doors of Depression			
March 10	Lovebites	Glory, Glory, to the World	Power metal	Victor	
March 10	WayV	Kick Back	K-pop	Label V, SM	
March 11	Ghost9	Now: Where We Are, Here		Maroo	
March 11	Radwimps	2+0+2+1+3+1+1= 10 years 10 songs			
March 12	The Anchoress	The Art of Losing		Kscope	
March 12	Blackmore's Night	Nature's Light	Folk rock	earMUSIC	
March 12	Blake Mills & Pino Palladino	Notes with Attachments		New Deal Music, Impulse!	
March 12	Central Cee	Wild West	UK drill	Central Cee	
March 12	Charles Lloyd and the Marvels	Tone Poem	Jazz	Blue Note	
March 12	Chika	Once Upon a Time		Warner	
March 12	The Crown	Royal Destroyer		Metal Blade	
March 12	DJ Muggs the Black Goat	Dies Occidendum	Illbient	Sacred Bones	
March 12	Eyehategod	A History of Nomadic Behavior	Sludge metal	Century Media	
March 12	Fulminacci	Tante care cose		Maciste Dischi	
March 12	Grouplove	This is This			
March 12	Hanalei	Black Snow		A-F	
March 12	Heart Healer	Heart Healer		Frontiers	
March 12	The Horrors	Lout		Wolf Tone Records	
March 12	Israel Nash	Topaz	Country rock, psychedelia, folk	Loose Music, Desert Folklore Music, Soundly Music	
March 12	James Levy	Soldier		Side Hustle Records, The Orchard	
March 12	Joshua Bassett	Joshua Bassett		Warner	
March 12	Justin Courtney Pierre	An Anthropologist on Mars		Epitaph	
March 12	Lake Street Dive	Obviously		Nonesuch	
March 12	Leanne Betasamosake Simpson	Theory of Ice		You've Changed	
March 12	Lushlife	Redamancy		Fortune Tellers Music	
March 12	Nick Jonas	Spaceman		Island	
March 12	The Paper Kites	Roses		Wonderlick	
March 12	Really From	Really From	Indie rock	Topshelf	
March 12	Rob Zombie	The Lunar Injection Kool Aid Eclipse Conspiracy	Industrial metal, heavy metal	Nuclear Blast	
March 12	The Rumjacks	Hestia	Celtic punk	ABC	
March 12	Saga	Symmetry	Progressive rock	earMUSIC	
March 12	Selena Gomez	Revelación		Interscope	
March 12	Sorry	A Night at the Windmill		Domino	
March 12	Stephanie Poetri	AM PM	Electropop	Infinite Thrills, 88rising, 12Tone	
March 12	Sunburned Hand of the Man	Pick a Day to Die		Three Lobed Recordings	
March 12	Thunder	All the Right Noises	Hard rock	BMG	
March 12	Tom Grennan	Evering Road	Indie pop	Insanity Records	
March 12	Valerie June	The Moon and Stars: Prescriptions for Dreamers		Fantasy	
March 15	Pentagon	Love or Take	K-pop	Cube	
March 16	Super Junior	The Renaissance	K-pop	SM	
March 17	Starrah	The Longest Interlude		Platoon	
March 18	Lil Mariko	Lil Mariko		Lil Mariko	
March 18	Paloma Mami	Sueños de Dalí		Sony Music Latin	
March 18	Tom Holkenborg	Zack Snyder's Justice League (soundtrack)	Electronic	WaterTower	
March 19	22Gz	The Blixky Tape 2	Brooklyn drill	Atlantic	
March 19	Agent Steel	No Other Godz Before Me		Dissonance Productions	
March 19	Alex Somers	Siblings			
March 19	Alex Somers	Siblings 2			
March 19	Alice Phoebe Lou	Glow			
March 19	Arcade Fire & Owen Pallett	Her (score)		Milan	
March 19	Bad Gyal	Warm Up		Aftercluv, Interscope	
March 19	Becca Mancari	Juniata		Captured Tracks	
March 19	Bell Orchestre	House Music		Erased Tapes	
March 19	Benny the Butcher & Harry Fraud	The Plugs I Met 2		Griselda	
March 19	Black Honey	Written & Directed		Foxfive Records	
March 19	The Blue Stones	Hidden Gems			
March 19	Chad VanGaalen	World's Most Stressed Out Gardener		Flemish Eye, Sub Pop	
March 19	Chinah	Feels Like Forever		The Orchard	
March 19	Daniel Lanois	Heavy Sun		Maker Series	
March 19	David Olney and Anana Kaye	Whispers and Sighs	Americana	Schoolkids	
March 19	DDG and OG Parker	Die 4 Respect		Epic	
March 19	Enforcer	Live by Fire II		Nuclear Blast	
March 19	Erra	Erra	Progressive metalcore	UNFD	
March 19	Gazelle Twin & NYX	Deep England			
March 19	Gentleman's Dub Club	Down to Earth	Reggae	Easy Star	
March 19	Guapdad 4000 and Illmind	1176	Hip-hop	Paradise Rising	
March 19	Harry Connick Jr.	Alone with My Faith	Christian	Verve, Universal, Capitol CMG	
March 19	Hedvig Mollestad Trio	Ding Dong. You're Dead.		Rune Grammofon	
March 19	Jared Evan	Collab			
March 19	Jon Batiste	We Are	New Orleans jazz, R&B	Verve	
March 19	Justin Bieber	Justice	Pop	RBMG, Def Jam	
March 19	The Knocks & Foster the People	Melody & Silence		Big Beat Records	
March 19	Kota the Friend and Statik Selektah	To Kill a Sunrise		FLTBYS	
March 19	Kshmr	Harmonica Andromeda		Spinnin', Dharma Worldwide	
March 19	Lana Del Rey	Chemtrails over the Country Club	Americana, country folk, folk	Interscope, Polydor	
March 19	Loretta Lynn	Still Woman Enough	Country	Legacy	
March 19	Madame	Madame	Hip-hop, R&B	Sugar Music	
March 19	Måneskin	Teatro d'ira: Vol. 1		RCA	
March 19	Michael Feuerstack	Harmonize the Moon		Forward	
March 19	Middle Kids	Today We're the Greatest		Universal Music Australia, Domino	
March 19	Nitin Sawhney	Immigrants		Outcaste Records	
March 19	Paloma Mami	Sueños de Dalí			
March 19	Paul Stanley's Soul Station	Now and Then		Universal	
March 19	Piso 21	El Amor en los Tiempos del Perreo			
March 19	Ringo Starr	Zoom In	Rock	Universal	
March 19	Saxon	Inspirations	Heavy metal	Silver Lining Music	
March 19	Serj Tankian	Elasticity	Nu metal, alternative metal	Alchemy Recordings, BMG	
March 19	Show Me the Body	Survive		Loma Vista	
March 19	Sting	Duets		A&M	
March 19	Tearjerker	Deep End		Bombshell Radio	
March 19	Trollfest	Happy Heroes		Napalm	
March 19	U.D.O.	Live in Bulgaria 2020 - Pandemic Survival Show		AFM	
March 19	Vegyn	Like a Good Old Friend		PLZ Make It Ruins	
March 19	Veronica Swift	This Bitter Earth		Mack Avenue	
March 19	William Doyle	Great Spans of Muddy Time		Tough Love Records	
March 19	Ziggy Alberts	Searching for Freedom		CommonFolk Records	
March 22	John Prine	John Prine and Friends Live at Newport Folk 2017		Newport Folk Festival	
March 24	Girls²	TV Anime "GaruGaku. ~St Girls Square Academy~" Complete Best		Sony Music Japan	
March 25	IU	Lilac	City pop		
March 26	24kGoldn	El Dorado	Hip-hop, alternative rock, pop	Columbia	
March 26	'68	Give One Take One		Cooking Vinyl	
March 26	AJR	OK Orchestra		AJR Productions, S-Curve	
March 26	The Antlers	Green to Gold		Transgressive	
March 26	Armand Hammer with The Alchemist	Haram	Hip-hop	Backwoodz Studioz	
March 26	Ben Howard	Collections from the Whiteout	Indie rock, folktronica	Island	
March 26	Benny Blanco	Friends Keep Secrets 2		Friends Keep Secrets, Interscope	
March 26	Carrie Underwood	My Savior	Gospel	Capitol Nashville	
March 26	Chevel Shepherd	Everybody's Got a Story			
March 26	Chris Corsano and Bill Orcutt	Made Out of Sound		Palilalia Records	
March 26	Citizen	Life in Your Glass World	Emo, indie rock, post-hardcore	Run for Cover	
March 26	Clark	Playground in a Lake	Electronic, ambient, contemporary classical	Deutsche Grammophon	
March 26	Dante Bowe	Circles	Contemporary gospel, Christian R&B	Bethel Music	
March 26	Death from Above 1979	Is 4 Lovers	Dance-punk	Universal Music Canada	
March 26	DJ Muggs & Flee Lord	Rammellzee		Soul Assassins Records, LordMobb, LLC	
March 26	Dr. Lonnie Smith	Breathe		Blue Note	
March 26	El Michels Affair	Yeti Season		Big Crown Records	
March 26	Elvis Costello	La Face de Pendule à Coucou		Concord	
March 26	Esther Rose	How Many Times	Country	Father/Daughter	
March 26	Evanescence	The Bitter Truth	Hard rock, gothic metal	BMG	
March 26	First Aid Kit	Who by Fire			
March 26	Floating Points, Pharoah Sanders and the London Symphony Orchestra	Promises		Luaka Bop	
March 26	For Those I Love	For Those I Love		September Recordings	
March 26	Gallant	Neptune		Empire	
March 26	Genghis Tron	Dream Weapon	Post-rock, progressive metal	Relapse	
March 26	Hannah Peel	Fir Wave		My Own Pleasure	
March 26	John Smith	The Fray		Thirty Tigers	
March 26	The Juliana Theory	A Dream Away		Rude, Equal Vision	
March 26	Karol G	KG0516	Reggaeton, Latin pop	Universal Latin	
March 26	L'Impératrice	Tako Tsubo		Microqlima Records	
March 26	Loney, Dear	A Lantern and a Bell		Real World	
March 26	Lost Girls (Jenny Hval & Håvard Volden)	Menneskekollektivet	Dance, electronic	Smalltown Supersound	
March 26	Memoriam	To the End		Reaper Entertainment	
March 26	Necronomicon	The Final Chapter		El Puerto	
March 26	Neil Young	Young Shakespeare	Folk rock	Reprise	
March 26	NF	Clouds (The Mixtape)	Hip-hop	NF Real Music	
March 26	Noga Erez	Kids		City Slang	
March 26	Real Estate	Half a Human		Domino	
March 26	Rod Wave	SoulFly		Alamo Records	
March 26	Ross Gay	Dilate Your Heart	Spoken-word	Jagjaguwar	
March 26	Sara Watkins	Under the Pepper Tree		New West	
March 26	serpentwithfeet	Deacon	R&B	Secretly Canadian	
March 26	Smith/Kotzen	Smith/Kotzen	Hard rock, blues rock	BMG	
March 26	Tate McRae	Too Young to Be Sad	Indie pop	RCA	
March 26	Tim Cohen	You Are Still Here		Bobo Integral	
March 26	Tomahawk	Tonic Immobility		Ipecac	
March 26	Tune-Yards	Sketchy		4AD	
March 26	Unkle	Rōnin I		Studio:UNKLE	
March 26	Vic Mensa	I Tape			
March 26	Xiu Xiu	Oh No	Indie rock, experimental rock, art pop	Polyvinyl	
March 26	YBN Nahmir	Visionland		Atlantic, Art@War	
March 29	Kang Seung-yoon	Page		YG	
March 29	Nils Frahm	Graz			
March 31	Ainsley Hamill	Not Just Ship Land	Folk	Ainsley Hamill	
March 31	Ecco2k	PXE		Year0001	
March 31	Morning Musume	16th: That's J-pop	J-pop	Zetima	
March 31	T1419	Before Sunrise Part. 2		MLD Entertainment	
March 31	WJSN	Unnatural		Starship	

== Second quarter ==
=== April ===
List of albums released in April 2021
Go to: January | February | March | April | May | June | Back to top
Release date	Artist	Album	Genre	Label	Ref.
April 1	Ratboys	Happy Birthday, Ratboy	Indie rock	Topshelf	
April 2	Bryce Dessner with the Australian String Quartet	Impermanence/Disintegration	Classical	37d03d	
April 2	Canaan Smith	High Country Sound	Country	Round Here Records, AWAL	
April 2	Cha Wa	My People		Single Lock	
April 2	Demi Lovato	Dancing with the Devil... the Art of Starting Over	Pop	Island	
April 2	Dry Cleaning	New Long Leg	Post-punk, spoken word	4AD	
April 2	Du Blonde	Homecoming		Daemon T.V	
April 2	La Femme	Paradigmes		Disque Pointu	
April 2	Flock of Dimes	Head of Roses		Sub Pop	
April 2	The Fratellis	Half Drunk Under a Full Moon	Baroque pop, chamber pop	Cooking Vinyl	
April 2	Gary Bartz	Gary Bartz JID006		Jazz Is Dead	
April 2	Glasvegas	Godspeed		Go Wow Records	
April 2	Godspeed You! Black Emperor	G_d's Pee at State's End!	Post-rock	Constellation	
April 2	Iglooghost	Lei Line Eon	UK bass, chamber music	Gloo	
April 2	Leslie Jordan	Company's Comin'	Gospel	Platoon	
April 2	Lil Tjay	Destined 2 Win	Hip-hop, trap	Columbia	
April 2	Luca Yupanqui	Sounds of the Unborn	Dark ambient, post-industrial, glitch	Sacred Bones	
April 2	Mark Bryan	Midlife Priceless			
April 2	Ryley Walker	Course in Fable	Folk rock, progressive rock	Husky Pants Records	
April 2	Sacred Oath	Return of the Dragon		Angel Thorne	
April 2	The Snuts	W.L.	Indie rock	Parlophone	
April 2	Various artists	Bills & Aches & Blues		4AD	
April 2	Vicetone	Legacy		Monstercat	
April 3	Esperanza Spalding	Triangle			
April 4	Justin Bieber	Freedom	Gospel, R&B, pop soul	Def Jam	
April 5	Wendy	Like Water	Pop	SM	
April 6	Killing Addiction	Mind of a New God	Death metal	Xtreem	
April 6	Sorry	Twixtustwain		Domino	
April 7	≠Me	Chōtokkyū ≠Me Iki		King Records	
April 7	Lyrical School	Wonderland		Victor Entertainment	
April 8	Mon Laferte	Seis		Universal Mexico	
April 8	Sufjan Stevens	Meditations	Ambient, electronic, space	Asthmatic Kitty	
April 9	Arion	Vultures Die Alone		AFM	
April 9	Blaze Bayley	War Within Me			
April 9	Brett Kissel	What Is Life?	Country	Warner Canada, ONErpm	
April 9	Briston Maroney	Sunflower			
April 9	Brockhampton	Roadrunner: New Light, New Machine	Alternative hip-hop	Question Everything, RCA	
April 9	CFCF	Memoryland		BGM Solutions	
April 9	Cheap Trick	In Another World		BMG	
April 9	Chris Cain	Raisin' Cain		Alligator	
April 9	Claire Rousay	A Softer Focus	Ambient	American Dreams	
April 9	Devil Sold His Soul	Loss		Nuclear Blast	
April 9	Dicta License	Pagbigkas		Dicta License	
April 9	Emily Kinney	The Supporting Character		Jullian Records	
April 9	The End Machine	Phase2		Frontiers	
April 9	Flyte	This Is Really Going to Hurt		Island	
April 9	Gisela João	AuRora			
April 9	Jean-Michel Jarre	Amazônia	Electronic, ambient	Sony Music	
April 9	Kauan	Ice Fleet			
April 9	Mägo de Oz	Bandera Negra			
April 9	Matthew E. White & Lonnie Holley	Broken Mirror, a Selfie Reflection		Spacebomb, Jagjaguwar	
April 9	Max Richter	Voices 2		Decca	
April 9	Merk	Infinite Youth		Humblebrag Records	
April 9	Miguel	Art Dealer Chic Vol. 4		ByStorm Entertainment, RCA	
April 9	Nick Waterhouse	Promenade Blue		Innovative Leisure	
April 9	Onyx	Onyx 4 Life			
April 9	Parker Millsap	Be Here Instead		Okrahoma Records, Thirty Tigers	
April 9	Peggy Seeger	First Farewell			
April 9	The Reverend Peyton's Big Damn Band	Dance Songs for Hard Times		Thirty Tigers	
April 9	Rhiannon Giddens and Francesco Turrisi	They're Calling Me Home	Folk	Nonesuch	
April 9	Samantha Crain	I Guess We Live Here Now			
April 9	Saille	V		Black Lion Records	
April 9	Skullcrusher	Storm in Summer		Secretly Canadian	
April 9	Small Black	Cheap Dreams		100% Electronica	
April 9	Sook-Yin Lee and Adam Litovitz	jooj two		Mint	
April 9	Taylor Swift	Fearless (Taylor's Version)	Country, country pop	Republic	
April 9	The Spirit of the Beehive	Entertainment, Death	Experimental rock, post-rock, psychedelic rock	Saddle Creek	
April 9	Vijay Iyer, Linda May Han Oh, and Tyshawn Sorey	Uneasy	Free jazz	ECM	
April 13	ILoveMakonnen	My Parade		Timeless Magic, Cor Tan Records	
April 13	Kang Daniel	Yellow	K-pop	Konnect, Sony Music	
April 14	Aimer	Walpurgis	Pop, rock	Sony Music Japan	
April 15	Sech	42	Reggaeton	Rich Music Inc.	
April 16	AJ Tracey	Flu Game	British hip-hop, UK drill, afroswing	Revenge Records	
April 16	Alex Henry Foster	Standing Under Bright Lights		Hopeful Tragedy	
April 16	Andy Stott	Never the Right Time		Modern Love	
April 16	The Armed	Ultrapop		Sargent House	
April 16	August Burns Red	Guardians Sessions		Fearless	
April 16	Benjamin Ingrosso	En gång i tiden (del 2)	Pop	TEN	
April 16	Cannibal Corpse	Violence Unimagined	Death metal	Metal Blade	
April 16	Carlos do Carmo	E Ainda...			
April 16	Conway the Machine	La Maquina	Hip-hop	Griselda, Drumwork Music Group, Empire	
April 16	Deine Lakaien	Dual			
April 16	Elise Davis	Anxious. Happy. Chill.		Tone Tree Music	
April 16	Enter Shikari	Moratorium (Broadcasts from the Interruption)		SO Recordings	
April 16	Eric Church	Heart		EMI Nashville	
April 16	Escape the Fate	Chemical Warfare	Hard rock, easycore, pop rock	Better Noise Music	
April 16	Fred Again	Actual Life (April 14 – December 17 2020)		Again.. Records	
April 16	Garage A Trois	Calm Down Cologne		Royal Potato Family	
April 16	Gotham (Talib Kweli and Diamond D)	Gotham			
April 16	Greta Van Fleet	The Battle at Garden's Gate		Lava, Republic	
April 16	Hail the Sun	New Age Filth		Equal Vision	
April 16	Holding Absence	The Greatest Mistake of My Life		SharpTone	
April 16	Irène Schweizer and Hamid Drake	Celebration	Free improvisation	Intakt	
April 16	Jaguar Jonze	Antihero		Nettwerk	
April 16	John Pizzarelli	Better Days Ahead		Ghostlight Deluxe	
April 16	Josh Radnor	One More Then I'll Let You Go		Flower Moon Records	
April 16	Liquid Tension Experiment	Liquid Tension Experiment 3	Instrumental, progressive metal	Inside Out	
April 16	London Grammar	Californian Soil		Metal & Dust, Ministry of Sound	
April 16	Natural Information Society with Evan Parker	Descension (Out of Our Constrictions)	Free jazz	Eremite, Aguirre Records	
April 16	Needtobreathe	Live from the Woods Vol. 2			
April 16	Nick Hakim and Roy Nathanson	Small Things		NYXO	
April 16	Norah Jones	'Til We Meet Again		Blue Note	
April 16	The Offspring	Let the Bad Times Roll	Punk rock, pop-punk	Concord	
April 16	Paul McCartney	McCartney III Imagined		Capitol	
April 16	Robin Trower, Maxi Priest, and Livingstone Brown	United State of Mind		Manhaton Records	
April 16	Saint Raymond	We Forgot We Were Dreaming			
April 16	Scooter	God Save the Rave		Kontor	
April 16	Sharon Van Etten	Epic Ten		Ba Da Bing	
April 16	Softcult	Year of the Rat	Grunge, shoegaze, riot grrrl	Easy Life Records	
April 16	Son Lux	Tomorrows III		City Slang	
April 16	Two Feet	Max Maco is Dead Right?			
April 16	Various artists	Slime Language 2	Hip-hop, trap	YSL	
April 16	The Vintage Caravan	Monuments		Napalm	
April 16	Vladislav Delay	Rakka II		Cosmo Rhythmatic	
April 16	While She Sleeps	Sleeps Society	Metalcore	Sleeps Brothers, Spinefarm	
April 19	NU'EST	Romanticize	K-pop	Pledis	
April 20	Eric Church	&		EMI Nashville	
April 20	Jeff Rosenstock	Ska Dream	Ska punk, punk rock, ska	Quote Unquote	
April 20	Penomeco	Dry Flower		P Nation, Dreamus	
April 20	Snoop Dogg	From tha Streets 2 tha Suites	G-funk		
April 21	Cordae	Just Until...	Hip-hop	Atlantic	
April 21	Kero Kero Bonito	Civilisation II		Polyvinyl	
April 22	Duki	Desde el Fin del Mundo		SSJ Records, Dale Play Records	
April 23	Alan Vega	Mutator		Sacred Bones	
April 23	Arooj Aftab	Vulture Prince		New Amsterdam	
April 23	Bodom After Midnight	Paint the Sky with Blood	Melodic death metal	Napalm	
April 23	Charlotte Cardin	Phoenix	Pop	Cult Nation	
April 23	Dâm-Funk	Architecture III		Glydezone Recordings	
April 23	Dinosaur Jr.	Sweep It Into Space		Jagjaguwar	
April 23	Dirty Honey	Dirty Honey			
April 23	Dumpstaphunk	Where Do We Go From Here		Mascot, The Funk Garage	
April 23	Eric Church	Soul	Outlaw country, country rock	EMI Nashville	
April 23	Ethel Cain	Inbred	Americana, slowcore	Daughters of Cain Records	
April 23	Field Music	Flat White Moon		Memphis Industries	
April 23	Fog Lake	Tragedy Reel		Orchid Tapes	
April 23	Gilby Clarke	The Gospel Truth		Golden Robot	
April 23	Imelda May	11 Past the Hour		Decca	
April 23	Justin Moore	Straight Outta the Country	Country	Valory	
April 23	Kaleo	Surface Sounds		Elektra	
April 23	Lilith Czar	Created from Filth and Dust		Sumerian	
April 23	Lil Yachty	Michigan Boy Boat	Hip-hop	Capitol	
April 23	The Mars Volta	Landscape Tantrums	Progressive rock, experimental rock	Clouds Hill	
April 23	Moneybagg Yo	A Gangsta's Pain	Hip-hop, trap	N-Less Entertainment, Interscope	
April 23	Motörhead	Louder Than Noise... Live in Berlin			
April 23	Myke Towers	Lyke Mike	Latin trap	One World International, Warner Music Latina, Warner	
April 23	Paysage d'Hiver	Geister		Kunsthall Produktionen	
April 23	The Peter Frampton Band	Frampton Forgets the Words		EMe	
April 23	PJ Harding and Noah Cyrus	People Don't Change		RCA	
April 23	Porter Robinson	Nurture		Mom + Pop	
April 23	RedHook	Bad Decisions			
April 23	Remember Sports	Like a Stone		Father/Daughter	
April 23	Shy FX and Breakage	Darker Than Blue		Digital Soundboy	
April 23	Sir Sly	The Rise & Fall of Loverboy		Interscope	
April 23	Solstice	Casting the Die		Emanzipation Productions	
April 23	Sonic Boom	Almost Nothing Is Nearly Enough	Electronic	Carpark	
April 23	Steve Cropper	Fire It Up		Mascot, Provogue	
April 23	Tilian Pearson	Factory Reset		Rise	
April 23	Tom Jones	Surrounded by Time		EMI	
April 26	AB6IX	Mo' Complete: Have a Dream		Brand New Music	
April 26	Enhypen	Border: Carnival	Pop rock, R&B	Belift Lab, Genie Music	
April 28	Morray	Street Sermons	Hip-hop, R&B	Pick Six Records	
April 28	Novelbright	Opening Declaration		Universal Sigma	
April 29	Flying Lotus	Yasuke		Warp	
April 29	Shelley FKA Dram	Shelley FKA Dram			
April 30	Adrian Crowley	The Watchful Eye of the Stars		Ba Da Bing	
April 30	The Alchemist	This Thing of Ours	Hip-hop	ALC Records	
April 30	Ali Barter	Chocolate Cake			
April 30	Amy Shark	Cry Forever		Wonderlick, Sony Music Australia	
April 30	Amy Speace	There Used to Be Horses Here		Proper, Wind Bone Records	
April 30	Ashley Monroe	Rosegold	Country, pop, hip-hop	Mountainrose Sparrow, Thirty Tigers	
April 30	Big Scary	Daisy		Pieater	
April 30	Birdy	Young Heart		Atlantic	
April 30	Bonnie "Prince" Billy and Matt Sweeney	Superwolves		Drag City	
April 30	Bowerbirds	becalmyounglovers		Psychic Hotline	
April 30	Burial + Blackdown	Shock Power of Love		Keysound Recordings	
April 30	Cadence Weapon	Parallel World	Canadian hip-hop	eOne	
April 30	Cake Pop	Cake Pop 2		Mad Decent	
April 30	The Coral	Coral Island	Psychedelic folk	Run On Records, Modern Sky UK	
April 30	Crumb	Ice Melt		Crumb Records	
April 30	Dawn Richard	Second Line	Alternative R&B, electronic, house	Merge	
April 30	Dropkick Murphys	Turn Up That Dial	Celtic punk, folk punk	Born & Bred Records	
April 30	Ed Maverick	Eduardo	Sadcore, neo-psychedelia, alterlatino	Universal Mexico	
April 30	Electric Boys	Ups!de Down		Mighty Music	
April 30	Elevation Worship and Maverick City Music	Old Church Basement	Contemporary worship music	Elevation Worship Records	
April 30	Evile	Hell Unleashed	Thrash metal	Napalm	
April 30	For Those I Love	For Those I Love (Instrumentals)		September Recordings	
April 30	Girl in Red	If I Could Make It Go Quiet	Indie pop, indie rock	AWAL	
April 30	Gojira	Fortitude	Progressive metal, groove metal, post-metal	Roadrunner	
April 30	Guided by Voices	Earth Man Blues	Indie rock, power pop	Guided by Voices, Inc.	
April 30	Jónsi	Tom Clancy's Without Remorse			
April 30	Joseph Shabason	The Fellowship		Telephone Explosion, Western Vinyl	
April 30	Juan Wauters	Real Life Situations		Captured Tracks	
April 30	Julia Michaels	Not in Chronological Order	Pop	Republic	
April 30	Julia Stone	Sixty Summers		BMG	
April 30	DJ Khaled	Khaled Khaled	Hip-hop	We the Best, Roc Nation, Epic	
April 30	Kučka	Wrestling	Pop, dance, electronic	LuckyMe	
April 30	Leon Vynehall	Rare, Forever		Ninja Tune	
April 30	Liz Stringer	First Time Really Feeling		Milk!, Remote Control	
April 30	Manchester Orchestra	The Million Masks of God	Indie rock, progressive rock	Loma Vista	
April 30	Marianne Faithfull and Warren Ellis	She Walks in Beauty		BMG	
April 30	Origami Angel	Gami Gang	Emo, easycore	Counter Intuitive	
April 30	Pet Shop Boys	Discovery: Live in Rio 1994		Parlophone	
April 30	Pink Floyd	Live at Knebworth 1990			
April 30	Róisín Murphy	Crooked Machine	House, techno	Skint, BMG	
April 30	Ronnie Milsap	A Better Word for Love	Country	Black River	
April 30	Royal Blood	Typhoons	Dance-rock, alternative rock, hard rock	Warner	
April 30	Teenage Fanclub	Endless Arcade	Alternative rock, jangle pop	PeMa, Merge	
April 30	Tetrarch	Unstable	Nu metal	Napalm	
April 30	Thomas Rhett	Country Again: Side A	Country	Valory	
April 30	Tony Allen	There Is No End		Blue Note	
April 30	Vreid	Wild North West		Season of Mist	
April 30	Zhu	Dreamland 2021	Electronic	Astralwerks	

=== May ===
List of albums released in May 2021
Go to: January | February | March | April | May | June | Back to top
Release date	Artist	Album	Genre	Label	Ref.
May 3	Highlight	The Blowing	K-pop	Around Us	
May 5	Mitski	This Is Where We Fall		Z2 Comics	
May 5	Monsta X	Flavors of Love	J-pop	Universal Music Japan	
May 5	Remi Wolf	We Love Dogs!		Island	
May 6	Sufjan Stevens	Convocations	Ambient, electronic, space	Asthmatic Kitty	
May 7	Ailee	Lovin'	R&B	Rocket3 Entertainment	
May 7	Alfie Templeman	Forever Isn't Long Enough		Chess Club Records	
May 7	Aly & AJ	A Touch of the Beat Gets You Up on Your Feet Gets You Out and Then Into the Sun	Pop, pop rock	Aly & AJ Music LLC, AWAL	
May 7	Anjimile	Reunion		Father/Daughter	
May 7	Artillery	X		Metal Blade	
May 7	Ashe	Ashlyn		Mom + Pop	
May 7	Bailey Bryan	Fresh Start			
May 7	BbyMutha	Bastard Tapes Vol. 3			
May 7	Bebe Rexha	Better Mistakes	Pop	Warner	
May 7	Cain	Rise Up	Christian country music	Provident	
May 7	Los Campesinos!	Whole Damn Body	Indie rock, emo	Heart Swells	
May 7	Chloe Moriondo	Blood Bunny		Fueled by Ramen	
May 7	Czarface and MF Doom	Super What?	Hip-hop, boom bap		
May 7	Daniel Bachman	Axacan		Three Lobed Recordings	
May 7	Death Cab for Cutie	Live at the Showbox			
May 7	Devonté Hynes	Mainstream (Original Motion Picture Soundtrack)		Milan	
May 7	Dodie	Build a Problem	Indie pop, alt-pop, folk-pop	The Orchard	
May 7	Fucked Up	Year of the Horse		Tankcrimes	
May 7	Iceage	Seek Shelter	Post-punk	Mexican Summer	
May 7	The Mighty Mighty Bosstones	When God Was Great	Ska punk	Hellcat	
May 7	Miranda Lambert, Jack Ingram and Jon Randall	The Marfa Tapes	Country, Texas country	RCA Nashville	
May 7	Nancy Wilson	You and Me		Carry On Music	
May 7	New Order	Education Entertainment Recreation (Live at Alexandra Palace)			
May 7	Procol Harum	Missing Persons (Alive Forever)		Esoteric	
May 7	Quando Rondo	Still Taking Risks		Never Broke Again, Atlantic	
May 7	Rag'n'Bone Man	Life by Misadventure	Soul, pop	Columbia	
May 7	Sarah Jarosz	Blue Heron Suite		Rounder	
May 7	Squid	Bright Green Field	Post-punk, krautrock, new wave	Warp	
May 7	Sumo Cyco	Initiation		Napalm	
May 7	Tee Grizzley	Built for Whatever		Atlantic	
May 7	Van Morrison	Latest Record Project, Volume 1		BMG	
May 7	Weezer	Van Weezer		Atlantic, Crush	
May 7	Wiki and Nah	Telephonebooth		Wikset Enterprise	
May 7	Will Stratton	The Changing Wilderness		Bella Union	
May 9	Lovejoy	Are You Alright?	Indie rock		
May 10	NCT Dream	Hot Sauce	K-pop	SM	
May 10	Oh My Girl	Dear OhMyGirl	K-pop	WM	
May 11	Oneus	Binary Code	K-pop	RBW Entertainment	
May 12	=Love	Zenbu, Naisho.		Sacra Music	
May 12	Isaiah Collier & The Chosen Few	Cosmic Transitions	Free jazz	Division 81 Records	
May 13	Akai Solo & Navy Blue	True Sky			
May 14	21 Savage	Spiral: From the Book of Saw Soundtrack		Slaughter Gang Entertainment	
May 14	Alan Jackson	Where Have You Gone	Country	ACR, EMI Nashville	
May 14	Belvedere	Hindsight is the Sixth Sense		Lockjaw Records	
May 14	The Black Keys	Delta Kream	Hill country blues	Easy Eye Sound, Nonesuch	
May 14	Creeper	Sounds from the Void	Horror punk, punk rock, emo	Roadrunner	
May 14	Daya	The Difference		Sandlot Records, AWAL	
May 14	Delta Goodrem	Bridge over Troubled Dreams		Sony Music Australia	
May 14	Fightmilk	Contender		Reckless Yes	
May 14	J. Cole	The Off-Season	Hip-hop	Dreamville, Roc Nation, Interscope	
May 14	Johnny Flynn and Robert Macfarlane	Lost in the Cedar Wood	Folk	Transgressive	
May 14	Jorja Smith	Be Right Back	R&B	FAMM	
May 14	Juliana Hatfield	Blood	Indie rock, pop rock	American Laundromat	
May 14	Morcheeba	Blackest Blue			
May 14	Myles Kennedy	The Ides of March		Napalm	
May 14	Paul Weller	Fat Pop (Volume 1)		Polydor	
May 14	Ryan Downey	A Ton of Colours		Dot Dash, Remote Control	
May 14	Sarah Neufeld	Detritus		One Little Independent	
May 14	SeeYouSpaceCowboy / If I Die First	A Sure Disaster		Pure Noise	
May 14	Shaed	High Dive		Photo Finish	
May 14	Solomun	Nobody Is Not Loved		NINL	
May 14	Sons of Kemet	Black to the Future	Jazz	Impulse!	
May 14	St. Vincent	Daddy's Home		Loma Vista	
May 14	Thalía	Desamorfosis		Sony Music Latin	
May 15	Panopticon	...And Again into the Light		Bindrune Recordings	
May 18	Edu Falaschi	Vera Cruz	Power metal	MS Metal Records	
May 18	Taemin	Advice	R&B	SM	
May 18	Young Nudy	Dr. Ev4l	Hip-hop, trap, horrorcore	RCA	
May 19	Eric Barone and Gentle Love (Norihiko Hibino and Ayaki)	Prescription for Sleep: Stardew Valley		Scarlet Moon Records	
May 19	LiSA	Ladybug			
May 20	Heize	Happen		P Nation	
May 20	Pixy	Bravery			
May 21	42 Dugg	Free Dem Boyz		4 Pockets Full, CMG	
May 21	Allison Russell	Outside Child	Americana, folk	Fantasy	
May 21	Biig Piig	The Sky Is Bleeding	Pop, R&B	Sony Music	
May 21	Billie Marten	Flora Fauna	Folk	Fiction	
May 21	Blake Shelton	Body Language		Warner Bros. Nashville	
May 21	Chai	Wink		Sub Pop	
May 21	Cloves	Nightmare on Elmfield Road			
May 21	Dayglow	Harmony House		Very Nice Records, AWAL	
May 21	Debauchery	Monster Metal		Massacre	
May 21	The Devil Wears Prada	ZII	Metalcore	Solid State	
May 21	Erika de Casier	Sensational		4AD	
May 21	Faith Coloccia and Philip Jeck	Stardust		Touch, Fairwood Music	
May 21	Fiddlehead	Between the Richness	Post-hardcore, emo	Run for Cover	
May 21	Gary Numan	Intruder	Gothic rock, industrial	BMG	
May 21	Georgia Anne Muldrow	VWETO III		Foreseen Entertainment, Epistrophik Peach Sound	
May 21	Gruff Rhys	Seeking New Gods		Rough Trade	
May 21	Holiday Sidewinder	Face of God		Lab78	
May 21	Jess and the Ancient Ones	Vertigo		Svart	
May 21	Lambchop	Showtunes		Merge, City Slang	
May 21	Lord Huron	Long Lost		Whispering Pine Studios Inc., Republic	
May 21	Lydia Ainsworth	Sparkles & Debris		Zombie Cat Records	
May 21	Mach-Hommy	Pray for Haiti	Underground hip-hop, jazz rap, experimental hip-hop	Griselda, Daupe!	
May 21	Mannequin Pussy	Perfect	Pop-punk, punk rock	Epitaph	
May 21	Mat Kearney	January Flower		Tomorrow Music, Caroline	
May 21	Mdou Moctar	Afrique Victime	Rock, blues, assouf	Matador	
May 21	Monster Magnet	A Better Dystopia	Stoner rock, hard rock	Napalm	
May 21	Must Die!	Crisis Vision		Never Say Die	
May 21	Navy Blue	Navy's Reprise			
May 21	Olivia Rodrigo	Sour	Alternative pop	Geffen, Interscope	
May 21	Pink	All I Know So Far: Setlist		RCA	
May 21	Pop Evil	Versatile	Hard rock, alternative rock, alternative metal	eOne Music	
May 21	Qveen Herby	A Woman	R&B, hip-hop, soul	Checkbook Records	
May 21	Reigning Sound	A Little More Time with Reigning Sound		Merge	
May 21	Robert Finley	Sharecropper's Son	Soul blues	Easy Eye Sound	
May 21	Sara Bareilles	Amidst the Chaos: Live from the Hollywood Bowl	Pop	Epic	
May 21	Sinéad Harnett	Ready Is Always Too Late		Thairish Limited	
May 21	Sunny Jain	Phoenix Rise		Sinj Records	
May 21	The Tragically Hip	Saskadelphia	Rock	Universal Music Canada	
May 21	Twenty One Pilots	Scaled and Icy		Fueled by Ramen	
May 21	Vexed	Culling Culture		Napalm	
May 21	Vola	Witness	Progressive metal, progressive rock	Mascot	
May 21	Wadada Leo Smith with Milford Graves and Bill Laswell	Sacred Ceremonies	Free jazz	TUM Records	
May 21	Waterparks	Greatest Hits		300	
May 21	Young M.A	Off the Yak		M.A Music, 3D	
May 26	ASP	Anal Sex Penis	J-pop	WACK	
May 26	Black Midi	Cavalcade		Rough Trade	
May 26	Camellia Factory	2nd Step		Zetima	
May 26	Mereba	AZEB			
May 28	A. G. Cook	Apple vs. 7G		PC Music	
May 28	Allday	Drinking with My Smoking Friends		Believe Music	
May 28	Bachelor (Jay Som and Ellen Kempner)	Doomin' Sun		Lucky Number Music	
May 28	Blackberry Smoke	You Hear Georgia	Southern rock	3 Legged Records	
May 28	Bladee	The Fool	Cloud rap, pop rap, trap	Year0001	
May 28	Bloodbound	Creatures of the Dark Realm		AFM	
May 28	The Bruce Lee Band	Division in the Heartland		Asian Man	
May 28	Bugzy Malone	The Resurrection			
May 28	Can	Live in Stuttgart 1975		Mute, Spoon	
May 28	DMX	Exodus	Hip-hop, East Coast hip-hop	Def Jam	
May 28	Easy Life	Life's a Beach	Alternative R&B, indie pop, hip-hop	Island	
May 28	The Gazette	Mass	Alternative metal	Sony Japan, JPU	
May 28	Juanes	Origen	Latin pop	Universal Music Latin	
May 28	Kele	The Waves Pt. 1	Electronic, rock, experimental	KOLA Records, !K7	
May 28	Lou Barlow	Reason to Live		Joyful Noise	
May 28	Moby	Reprise		Deutsche Grammophon	
May 28	Mustafa	When Smoke Rises	Indie folk, R&B	Regent Park Songs	
May 28	Natalia Lafourcade	Un Canto por México, Vol. 2	Folk, bolero, son jarocho	Sony Music Latin	
May 28	Natanael Cano	A Mis 20		JHRH, Warner Latina	
May 28	Of Mice & Men	Bloom	Metalcore	SharpTone	
May 28	Perturbator	Lustful Sacraments		Blood Music	
May 28	Portal	Avow		Profound Lore	
May 28	Portal	Hagbulbia		Profound Lore	
May 28	Portico Quartet	Terrain		Gondwana	
May 28	Salvador Sobral	BPM	Jazz	Warner Music Spain	
May 28	Sports Team	Plant Test			
May 28	Sweet Trip	A Tiny House, In Secret Speeches, Polar Equals	Glitch pop, dream pop	Darla	
May 28	Teenage Joans	Taste of Me	Rock, punk rock	Teenage Joans	
May 28	Texas	Hi		BMG	
May 28	The Veronicas	Godzilla	Pop rock, electropop	Sony Music Australia	
May 31	Reese Lansangan	Time Well Spent			
May 31	Tomorrow X Together	The Chaos Chapter: Freeze	K-pop, pop rock, pop-punk	Big Hit	

=== June ===
List of albums released in June 2021
Go to: January | February | March | April | May | June | Back to top
Release date	Artist	Album	Genre	Label	Ref.
June 1	B.I	Waterfall	Hip-hop, R&B	131 Label	
June 1	Monsta X	One of a Kind	K-pop	Starship	
June 2	Sleepy Hallow	Still Sleep?		Winners Circle Entertainment, RCA	
June 3	Ghost9	Now: When We Are in Love		Maroo	
June 4	Atreyu	Baptize		Spinefarm	
June 4	Billy Gibbons	Hardware	Rock	Concord	
June 4	Cleopatrick	Bummer		Nowhere Special Recordings	
June 4	Crowded House	Dreamers Are Waiting	Jangle pop	EMI Australia	
June 4	Flotsam and Jetsam	Blood in the Water	Thrash metal	AFM	
June 4	Greentea Peng	Man Made		AMF Records	
June 4	Hildegard (Helena Deland and Ouri)	Hildegard	Experimental pop	section1	
June 4	James	All the Colours of You	Stadium rock, electronic		
June 4	Japanese Breakfast	Jubilee	Alternative pop, dream pop, indie pop	Dead Oceans	
June 4	Joy Oladokun	In Defense of My Own Happiness		Amigo Records, Verve Forecast, Republic	
June 4	Left at London	T.I.A.P.F.Y.H.	Indie pop, lo-fi, indie folk		
June 4	Lil Baby and Lil Durk	The Voice of the Heroes		Quality Control, Motown, Alamo	
June 4	Liz Phair	Soberish	Indie rock	Chrysalis	
June 4	Lloyd Banks	The Course of the Inevitable	Hip-hop, East Coast hip-hop	Money by Any Means	
June 4	Loraine James	Reflection	Electronic	Hyperdub	
June 4	Red Fang	Arrows		Relapse	
June 4	Renforshort	Off Saint Dominique		Interscope	
June 4	Riley Clemmons	Godsend		Capitol CMG	
June 4	Rise Against	Nowhere Generation	Punk rock, melodic hardcore	Loma Vista	
June 4	Rostam	Changephobia		Matsor Projects, Secretly Distribution	
June 4	San Holo	bb u ok?		Bitbird	
June 4	Tim Buckley	Bear's Sonic Journals: Merry-Go-Round at the Carousel		Owsley Stanley Foundation	
June 4	Van Canto	To the Power of Eight	A cappella, metal	Napalm	
June 4	Wolf Alice	Blue Weekend		Dirty Hit	
June 6	Iginari Tohoku San	Tokyo Invader			
June 7	Exo	Don't Fight the Feeling	K-pop, R&B, dance	SM	
June 8	Kiyoshi Hikawa	Minamikaze Fukeba	Enka, kayōkyoku	Nippon Columbia	
June 8	Poppy	Eat (NXT Soundtrack)	Metalcore, industrial pop	Sumerian	
June 8	Todrick Hall	Femuline	Dance-pop, pop rap	Frtyfve Records	
June 9	ZOC	PvP		Avex Trax	
June 10	Bo Burnham	Inside (The Songs)	Comedy, synth-pop	Attic Bedroom, Imperial, Mercury	
June 10	Duki	Vivo Desde el Fin del Mundo		SSJ Records, Dale Play Records	
June 11	AFI	Bodies		Rise	
June 11	Angel Dust	Bigger House		Roadrunner	
June 11	Azure Ray	Remedy		Flower Moon Records	
June 11	Cory Wong and Dave Koz	The Golden Hour		Just Koz Entertainment	
June 11	Danny Elfman	Big Mess	Industrial rock, progressive metal	Anti-, Epitaph	
June 11	Dean Blunt	Black Metal 2	Experimental	Rough Trade	
June 11	Elissa Mielke	Finally		Slashie, Mom + Pop	
June 11	Emotional Oranges	The Juicebox			
June 11	Garbage	No Gods No Masters	Electronic rock	Stunvolume, Infectious Music	
June 11	Green Jellÿ	Garbage Band Kids		Cleopatra	
June 11	Islands	Islomania		Royal Mountain	
June 11	Joe Bonamassa	Now Serving: Royal Tea - Live from the Ryman			
June 11	Julian Lage Trio	Squint		Blue Note	
June 11	Keith Rowe	Absence		Erstwhile	
June 11	KennyHoopla & Travis Barker	Survivors Guilt: The Mixtape		Arista, Mogul Vision	
June 11	King Gizzard & the Lizard Wizard	Butterfly 3000	Dream pop, neo-psychedelia, art pop	KGLW	
June 11	Lukas Nelson & Promise of the Real	A Few Stars Apart		Fantasy	
June 11	Mammoth WVH	Mammoth WVH	Hard rock, alternative rock	EX1 Records, Explorer1 Music Group	
June 11	Marina	Ancient Dreams in a Modern Land	Pop, electropop, dance-pop	Atlantic	
June 11	Maroon 5	Jordi	Pop, pop rap, R&B	222, Interscope	
June 11	Marshmello	Shockwave		Joytime Collective	
June 11	Migos	Culture III	Hip-hop	Quality Control, Capitol, Motown	
June 11	Noel Gallagher's High Flying Birds	Back the Way We Came: Vol. 1 (2011–2021)	Rock	Sour Mash Records	
June 11	Phosphorescent	The BBC Sessions		Dead Oceans	
June 11	Pi'erre Bourne	The Life of Pi'erre 5		SossHouse, Interscope	
June 11	Polo G	Hall of Fame	Trap, drill	Columbia	
June 11	Press to Meco	Transmute		Marshall	
June 11	Ryan Adams	Big Colors		PAX AM	
June 11	Skyzoo	All the Brilliant Things		MMG	
June 11	Slayyyter	Troubled Paradise	Hyperpop	Fader Label	
June 11	Sleater-Kinney	Path of Wellness	Punk rock	Mom+Pop	
June 11	Sly Withers	Gardens	Punk rock	Dew Process	
June 11	Twice	Taste of Love	K-pop, bossa nova, synth-pop	JYP, Republic	
June 11	Vincint	There Will Be Tears			
June 11	Your Old Droog	Time		Mongoloid Banks, Nature Sounds	
June 16	BTS	BTS, the Best	J-pop	Big Hit, Def Jam	
June 16	Rebecca Black	Rebecca Black Was Here			
June 17	Brave Girls	Summer Queen		Brave	
June 18	Ambar Lucid	Get Lost in the Music		300	
June 18	Angélique Kidjo	Mother Nature			
June 18	Berwyn	Tape 2/Fomalhaut		Columbia	
June 18	Deap Vally	American Cockroach		Cooking Vinyl	
June 18	Fear Factory	Aggression Continuum	Industrial metal, groove metal	Nuclear Blast	
June 18	GoldLink	Haram!			
June 18	Griff	One Foot in Front of the Other	Pop	Warner	
June 18	Gucci Mane	Ice Daddy		1017, Atlantic	
June 18	Hacktivist	Hyperdialect		UNFD	
June 18	Helloween	Helloween	Power metal	Nuclear Blast	
June 18	H.E.R.	Back of My Mind	R&B, soul	RCA	
June 18	Joan Armatrading	Consequences		BMG	
June 18	Kings of Convenience	Peace or Love		EMI	
June 18	Mykki Blanco	Broken Hearts & Beauty Sleep		Transgressive	
June 18	Olamide	UY Scuti	Afrobeats, pop rap	YBNL Nation, Empire	
June 18	Rory Feek	The Gentle Man		Gaither Records	
June 18	Serj Tankian	Disarming Time - A Modern Piano Concerto			
June 18	Seth Sentry	Super Cool Tree House	Hip-hop	High Score Records	
June 18	Seventeen	Your Choice	K-pop	Pledis	
June 18	Speed Dealer Moms (John Frusciante, Aaron Funk, and Chris McDonald)	SDM-LA8-441-114-211		Evar Records	
June 18	Styx	Crash of the Crown	Progressive rock, hard rock	UMe	
June 18	Timo Tolkki's Avalon	The Enigma Birth	Symphonic power metal	Frontiers	
June 18	Tom Morello and The Bloody Beetroots	The Catastrophists			
June 18	Tyler Bates	DC Dark Nights: Death Metal		Loma Vista	
June 20	Backxwash	I Lie Here Buried with My Rings and My Dresses	Industrial hip-hop, horrorcore	UglyHag Records	
June 21	Mike	Disco!	Hip-hop	10K	
June 22	Car Seat Headrest	MADLO: Influences		Matador	
June 22	Car Seat Headrest	MADLO: Remixes		Matador	
June 23	Beabadoobee	Our Extended Play	Indie rock	Dirty Hit	
June 23	Hobo Johnson	The Revenge of Hobo Johnson		DashGo	
June 24	Pabllo Vittar	Batidão Tropical		Sony Music	
June 25	Beartooth	Below		Red Bull	
June 25	Brian Kelley	Sunshine State of Mind		Warner Nashville	
June 25	Buckcherry	Hellbound		Round Hill Records	
June 25	Caroline Shaw and Sō Percussion	Let the Soil Play Its Simple Part		Nonesuch	
June 25	Cautious Clay	Deadpan Love		The Orchard	
June 25	Cedric Burnside	I Be Trying	Blues	Single Lock	
June 25	Darkthrone	Eternal Hails		Peaceville	
June 25	Dave Keuning	A Mild Case of Everything		Pretty Faithful	
June 25	Doja Cat	Planet Her	Pop, hip-hop, R&B	Kemosabe, RCA	
June 25	Drug Church	Tawny		Pure Noise	
June 25	Eve 6	Grim Value		Velocity, Equal Vision	
June 25	Evidence	Unlearning Vol. 1	Hip-hop	Rhymesayers	
June 25	Faye Webster	I Know I'm Funny Haha	Indie country, soft rock, indie pop	Secretly Canadian	
June 25	Gorgon City	Olympia		Virgin EMI, Astralwerks	
June 25	Hiatus Kaiyote	Mood Valiant	Neo soul, alternative R&B	Brainfeeder	
June 25	Hiss Golden Messenger	Quietly Blowing It			
June 25	Hypnotic Brass Ensemble	This Is a Mindfulness Drill		Jagjaguwar	
June 25	Iñigo Pascual	Options: The Album		Tarsier Records	
June 25	Jack Savoretti	Europiana		EMI	
June 25	John Grant	Boy from Michigan	Synth-pop, indie rock	Bella Union	
June 25	Justine Skye	Space & Time			
June 25	Kojaque	Town's Dead		PIAS	
June 25	Lady Gaga	Born This Way Reimagined		Interscope	
June 25	Light the Torch	You Will Be the Death of Me	Alternative metal, metalcore	Nuclear Blast	
June 25	Lightman Jarvis Ecstatic Band (Yves Jarvis and Romy Lightman)	Banned		Anti-	
June 25	Lady A	What a Song Can Do (Chapter One)	Country	Big Machine	
June 25	LoneLady	Former Things		Warp	
June 25	Lucy Dacus	Home Video	Indie rock, pop, lo-fi	Matador	
June 25	Maple Glider	To Enjoy Is the Only Thing			
June 25	The Marías	Cinema		Atlantic	
June 25	Meghan Patrick	Heart on My Glass		Warner Canada, Riser House Records	
June 25	Michael League	So Many Me		GroundUPmusic	
June 25	Modest Mouse	The Golden Casket		Epic	
June 25	Mother Mother	Inside	Indie rock	Warner Music Canada	
June 25	The Mountain Goats	Dark in Here		Merge	
June 25	Phil Wickham	Hymn of Heaven	Contemporary worship, contemporary Christian	Fair Trade Services	
June 25	Pom Pom Squad	Death of a Cheerleader	Indie rock	City Slang	
June 25	Rauw Alejandro	Vice Versa	Electropop, house, reggaeton	Sony Music Latin, Duars Entertainment	
June 25	Sasu Ripatti	Fun Is Not a Straight Line		Planet Mu	
June 25	Sault	Nine	R&B, neo soul	Forever Living Originals	
June 25	Scale the Summit	Subjects	Progressive metal, djent	Scale the Summit	
June 25	Six Organs of Admittance	The Veiled Sea		Three Lobed Recordings	
June 25	Ski Mask the Slump God	Sin City			
June 25	Spellling	The Turning Wheel		Sacred Bones	
June 25	Squirrel Flower	Planet (I)		Full Time Hobby	
June 25	Sullivan King	Loud		Hopeless	
June 25	Tyler, the Creator	Call Me If You Get Lost	Hip-hop, jazz, soul	Columbia	
June 25	The Veronicas	Human	Pop, electropop	Sony Music Australia	
June 28	Loona	[&]	Power pop	Blockberry Creative	
June 28	Shinee	Superstar	J-pop	EMI	
June 30	Hunter Brothers	Been a Minute		Open Road	
June 30	Ten Tonnes	So Long		Silver Heat Records	
June 30	Vivien Goldman	Next Is Now		Youth Sounds, Cadiz Entertainment	
