= Tearjerker =

Tearjerker is something that provokes sadness or pathos, as the name suggests. Tearjerker may refer to:

- "Tearjerker" (American Dad!), a 2008 episode of American Dad!
- "Tearjerker" (song), a 1995 song by Red Hot Chili Peppers
- "Tearjerker", a song from Korn's 2005 album See You on the Other Side
- Tearjerker (band), a band from Toronto, Canada

== See also ==
- Melodrama
