= Runnner =

- Born: Noah Henry Weinman
- Origin: Los Angeles, California, U.S.
- Genre: Indie rock
- Years active: 2017-present
- Label: Run for Cover Records
- Website: runnner.band

Runnner is the stage name of American indie rock musician Noah Henry Weinman. Weinman is based in Los Angeles.

== History ==
Weinman began releasing music under the stage name Runnner in 2017, when he self-released his debut album titled Awash, which is now only available on Bandcamp. After the release, Runnner released his first EP in 2019 titled Fan On, with another EP to follow in 2020 titled One of One. These releases caught the attention of Boston based record label Run for Cover Records, who signed him to the label in 2021. Upon signing to the label, Runnner announced plans to release a new album titled Always Repeating. The album is a collection of reworked tracks from his 2017 release Awash, and songs from the One of One EP. The album was released on July 16, 2021. The album features contributions from fellow Los Angeles musician Hellen Ballentine, known professionally as Skullcrusher. In 2023, Weinman announced his official debut full-length album of all new material. The album, Like Dying Stars, We're Reaching Out, was released on February 17, 2023. In 2024, Runnner released an ambient album titled starsdust composed and arranged entirely from the stems of his 2023 album Like Dying Stars, We're Reaching Out.

== Discography ==
=== Studio albums ===
- awash (2017), self-released
- Always Repeating (2021), Run for Cover
- like dying stars, we're reaching out (2023), Run for Cover
- starsdust (2024), Run for Cover
- dust 2 (2024), Run for Cover
- A Welcome Kind of Weakness (2025), Run for Cover

=== Live albums ===
- Live in Los Angeles 08-09-2022 (2023), Run for Cover

=== EPs ===
- Fan On (2019), self-released
- One of One (2020), self-released
- Always Repeating Demos (2022), Run for Cover
- Chamomile (2025), Run for Cover

=== Singles ===
- "Eggshell" (2019), self-released
- "Frame" (2019), self-released
- "Housekeys" (with Field Medic) (2021), Run for Cover
- "Monochrome" (2021), Run for Cover
- "Snowplow" (with Skullcrusher) (2021), Run for Cover
- "Colors" (with Sun June) (2021), Run for Cover
- "Vines to Make It All Worth It" (2022), Run for Cover
- "bluejay" (2023), Run for Cover
- "another sublet" (2023), Run for Cover
- "ten + eleven" (2024), Run for Cover
- "Untitled October Song" (2024), Run for Cover
- "Coinstar" (2025), Run for Cover
- "Spackle" (2025), Run for Cover
