= Lego White Noise =

Studio album by Lego
- Released: 1 February 2021
- Genre: White noise; musique concrète; experimental
- Length: 209:46
- Label: West One

Lego White Noise is an album or playlist of white noise created solely with the sounds of Lego bricks. Released as a stream in February 2021 by the Lego Group, the 210-minute album was recorded by sound designers using 10,000 bricks, with each track focused on separate routines or sounds, and features ASMR qualities intended to help adults relax. It has been described as a work of musique concrète.

== Recording and composition ==
Lego White Noise was conceived by the Lego Group's creative head Primus Manokaran, who deems it "a collection of soundscapes" intended to aid with relaxation and mindfulness. Author Sandeep Das describes it as an "audio supplement" for listeners "trying to go to sleep, after a stressful meeting or while taking a stroll in the park". It was part of a larger Lego relaxation campaign intended for adults, alongside Lego products including a flower bouquet and bonsai tree.

The album, which runs for 210 minutes, includes seven 30-minute tracks, and consists entirely of the "sounds of people building/pouring/searching for LEGO bricks." Sound designers worked with 10,000 Lego bricks to experiment with in the album's creation, and each track profiles a different sound or routine, including pieces being trickled or clicked. Manokaran said that he found each brick to have their own distinct acoustic properties, and referred to the recording as "like composing with 10,000 tiny instruments." The designers used a multitude of Lego elements ranging in size, and to achieve ambience, the only audio signal processing techniques used were equalization and reverb. It has been described as white noise, and a "soothing ASMR playlist". John Doran of The Guardian also noted the ASMR qualities and compared some parts of the album to Einstürzende Neubauten and the music covered in The Wire.

"Built for Two" is an abstract noise track depicting the sound of a typical Lego session, with "bricks being scraped across baseplates". "Searching for the One (Brick)" showcases a hand rustling through a bag of bricks, followed by "the sought-after brick being set aside for later use." "Wild as the Wind" emulates the sound of rustling trees in the wind, achieved by "sifting through waves of LEGOs". "The Waterfall" is the sound of numerous bricks being poured onto each other, while "It All Clicks" is centred on the sound of bricks being clicked together.

== Release and reception ==
Lego White Noise was released by the Lego Group and West One Music Group on 1 February 2021. It was made available for free download and streaming on music platforms including Spotify, iTunes and Apple Music. The album cover features Lego's adult-oriented flower bouquet set.

In his article for The Guardian, John Doran wrote that "Lego White Noise joins the ranks of great musique concrète" and deemed it to be "the experimental album of 2021". He noted that the sounds of Lego bricks may change when the company switches production to more eco-friendly plastics, and that in documenting "a potentially doomed sound", the album could become "a work of hauntology, a valuable sonic document evoking happy cultural memories of childhoods, and parenthoods, via sounds now in danger of being altered for good." A reviewer for YP noted that while Lego bricks are known for making "distractingly sharp noises", the album instead profiles "a calm white noise that will down out most unwanted sounds." They wrote: "The soothing sound of trickling, rustling, clicking, falling is magnificently Zen, and the perfect soundscape for these troubled times." Clinton Matos of Hypertext wrote that while the album is promoted as white noise, it is better understood as a work of ASMR, which they deemed "a real rabbit hole of a subject and a big money maker for creators of it on places like YouTube." Michele Debczak of Mental Floss recommended the album for white noise or "brain-tingling ASMR". "Searching for the One (Brick)" has been highlighted as the album's best track by several writers.

== Track listing ==
1. "Built for Two" – 30:00
2. "Wild as the Wind" – 30:00
3. "Searching for the One (Brick)" – 29:46
4. "It All Clicks" – 30:00
5. "The Waterfall" – 30:00
6. "Big Hearted Bricks" – 30:00
7. "The Night Builder" – 30:00

== Personnel ==
- Jinn – sound engineer

== See also ==
- Field recording
- Ambient music
