= Quiet the Room =

Studio album by Skullcrusher
- Released: October 14, 2022
- Length: 41:00
- Label: Secretly Canadian
- Producers: Andrew Sarlo, Noah Weinman

Professional ratings
Aggregate scores
Source	Rating
AnyDecentMusic?	7.7/10
Metacritic	80/100
Review scores
Source	Rating
AllMusic	3.5/5 stars
Under the Radar	8.5/10 stars
NME	4/5 stars
DIY!	8.0/10
Paste	7.8/10
Beats Per Minute	75/100
Pitchfork	7.2/10

Quiet the Room is the debut studio album from indie folk musician Skullcrusher. The album was released on October 14, 2022, by Secretly Canadian.

== Track listing ==
All songs written by Helen Ballentine.

No.	Title	Length
1.	"They Quiet The Room"	3:33
2.	"Building a Swing"	3:36
3.	"Whatever Fits Together"	3:45
4.	"Whistle of the Dead"	1:19
5.	"Lullaby in February"	4:35
6.	"Pass Through Me"	2:24
7.	"Could It Be the Way I Look at Everything?"	0:37
8.	"Outside, Playing"	2:08
9.	"It's Like a Secret"	3:26
10.	"Sticker"	4:11
11.	"Window Somewhere"	4:25
12.	"(Secret Instrumental)"	1:19
13.	"Quiet the Room"	3:24
14.	"You Are My House"	3:08
Total length:		41:00
