= Bad Dream Jaguar =

Studio album by Sun June
- Released: October 20, 2023
- Length: 41:45
- Label: Run for Cover

Sun June chronology
Somewhere (2021)	Bad Dream Jaguar (2023)

Singles from Bad Dream Jaguar
- 1. "Get Enough" Released: August 15, 2023; 2. "Easy Violence" Released: September 6, 2023; 3. "Jon Prine" Released: September 6, 2023

Bad Dream Jaguar is the third studio album by American indie pop band Sun June. It was released on October 20, 2023, by Run for Cover Records.

== Background ==
On August 15, 2023, Sun June announced the release of their third studio album, along with the first single "Get Enough".

The band then released two singles — "Easy Violence" and "Jon Prine" — on September 6, 2023.

== Tour ==
In support of the album, Sun June went on tour with indie bands Runner and Slaughter Beach, Dog from November 2023 at the Somerville Theatre in Somerville, Massachusetts, and ending in January 2024 at Rickshaw Theatre in Vancouver.

== Critical reception ==
Professional ratings
Aggregate scores
Source	Rating
Metacritic	81/100
Review scores
Source	Rating
The Line of Best Fit	7/10
Paste	7.9/10

Bad Dream Jaguar was met with "universal acclaim" reviews from critics. At Metacritic, which assigns a weighted average rating out of 100 to reviews from mainstream publications, this release received an average score of 81, based on four reviews.

Writing for The Line of Best Fit, Amaya Lim gave the release a seven out of ten, noting "Bad Dream Jaguar reads as a meditation on separation, rather than a lamentation or condemnation. Colwell seems to address herself and her relationship from a third party's perspective, a layer of poetry between the writing and her experience."

== Track listing ==
Bad Dream Jaguar track listing
No.	Title	Length
1.	"Eager"	3:20
2.	"16 Riders"	3:05
3.	"Mixed Bag"	3:19
4.	"Moon Ahead"	4:18
5.	"Ambitions"	4:12
6.	"Easy Violence"	2:22
7.	"John Prine"	2:54
8.	"Sage"	4:43
9.	"Washington Square"	3:25
10.	"Get Enough"	3:23
11.	"Texas"	3:56
12.	"Lightning"	2:48
