= My Other People =

Studio album by TV Priest
- Released: 17 June 2022
- Studio: Studio East (London)
- Genres: Post-punk; gothic rock; art punk
- Length: 41:17
- Label: Sub Pop
- Producer: Nic Bueth

TV Priest chronology
Uppers (2021)	My Other People (2022)	Cartoons (2026)

Singles from My Other People
- 1. "One Easy Thing" Released: 15 February 2022; 2. "Bury Me In My Shoes" Released: 29 March 2022

My Other People is the second studio album by English post-punk band, TV Priest. The album was released on 17 June 2022 through Sub Pop Records. it is the last album to feature Nic Bueth And Ed Kelland who left the band once the tour ended and the band seemingly went on an indefinite hiatus until 2026.

== Background ==
On 29 March 2022, the band announced their second album, along with the single "Bury Me in My Shoes". In an interview with Paste, lead singer Charlie Drinkwater said, "My Other People is a more 'open' set of songs, both musically and in our themes; in the process of writing we found ourselves talking about things other than anger or aggression. We wanted to discuss love, loss and joy too. It's a record about personal disintegration and destruction, but also rebuilding again after this. It's also heavily rooted in place, the music being a very direct response to Britain and England in 2021, but in a more abstract and textural sense."

== Critical reception ==
Professional ratings
Aggregate scores
Source	Rating
Metacritic	67/100
Review scores
Source	Rating
AllMusic	3.5/5 stars
Dork	4/5 stars
God Is in the TV	9/10
Kerrang!	3/5 stars
The Line of Best Fit	7/10
Loud and Quiet	5/10
Mojo	3/5 stars
PopMatters	6/10
Uncut	7/10

My Other People received mixed reviews from contemporary music critics. On review aggregator website, Metacritic, My Other People has an average rating of 67 out of 100 indicating "generally favorable reviews".

== Track listing ==
All tracks are written by TV Priest.

No.	Title	Length
1.	"One Easy Thing"	3:26
2.	"Bury Me in My Shoes"	4:01
3.	"Limehouse Cut"	2:56
4.	"I Have Learnt Nothing"	3:31
5.	"It Was Beautiful"	3:33
6.	"The Happiest Place on Earth"	2:03
7.	"My Other People"	3:30
8.	"The Breakers"	3:51
9.	"Unraveling"	4:08
10.	"It Was a Gift"	3:33
11.	"I Am Safe Here"	2:56
12.	"Sunland"	3:49
Total length:		41:22

== Personnel ==
TV Priest

- Charlie Drinkwater – vocals, artwork
- Nic Bueth – bass, synthesizer, piano, strings, production, mixing
- Alex Sprogis – guitars, synthesizer
- Ed Kelland – drums, percussion, synthesizer

Additional contributors

- Kevin Tuffy – mastering
- Ed Thompson – photography
- Bridget Beorse – artwork
