= Palberta5000 =

Studio album by Palberta
- Released: January 22, 2021
- Recorded: December 2020
- Genres: Indie rock; post-punk; noise-punk
- Length: 37:27
- Label: Wharf Cat

Palberta chronology
Roach Goin' Down (2018)	Palberta5000 (2021)

Professional ratings
Aggregate scores
Source	Rating
AnyDecentMusic?	7.2/10
Metacritic	77/100
Review scores
Source	Rating
AllMusic	3.5/5 stars
Beats Per Minute	81%
The Line of Best Fit	8/10
MusicOMH	4/5 stars
The Observer	3/5 stars
Paste	7.5/10
Pitchfork	6.8/10

Palberta5000 is the fifth studio album by American indie rock band Palberta. It was released on January 22, 2021, through Wharf Cat Records.

== Release ==
On October 6, 2020, Palberta announced the release of their fifth studio album. In a press release for the album, the band explained: "While punk music was our first love, pop music has become our fixation. Throughout the making of Palberta5000, we were focused on making music that people could not only sing along to but get stuck in their head... that and attempting to make songs longer than 50 seconds... While our melodies have gotten more melodic and our singing less harsh, we haven't strayed too far from who Palberta is, defiantly Palberta."

=== Single ===
The first single to be released from the album, "Before I Got Here" on October 6, 2020.

On November 12, 2020, the band released the second single "Corner Store".

== Critical reception ==
Palberta5000 was met with "generally favorable" reviews from critics. At Metacritic, which assigns a weighted average rating out of 100 to reviews from mainstream publications, this release received an average score of 77 based on 10 reviews. At AnyDecentMusic?, the release was given a 7.2 out of 10 based on 9 reviews.

In a review for AllMusic, Paul Simpson wrote: "New York-based abstract punks Palberta went into the recording of their fifth album with the intention to create songs which were catchier and less abrasive than their previous material. Their earlier releases were filled with minute-long energetic bursts of angular riffs and playground-like shrieks, with tracks often burning out quickly, sometimes dissolving into fits of laughter." Jasper Willems of Beats Per Minute said: "Palberta5000 is a fragmented noise punk rock record that hypnotized itself into believing its pop music meant to be sung to the masses, and performed with the same kind of bluster. The album’s 16 short and sharp songs were captured in a span of just four days, which contributes to that off-the-cuff energy." Writing for The Line of Best Fit, Ben Lynch explained: "Throughout Palberta5000, that new manifests itself in ways beyond the brighter vocal arrangements. While the record continues to boast a long track list and short song lengths, Palberta have also expanded upon their love of jams and cyclical song structures. Lyrically, they continue to concern themselves with the minutiae of the everyday.

At The Observer, Damien Morris gave a mixed review with three out of five stars, noting the band has a "perkier production" but "don’t quite have the strength of songwriting to leave the scuzz completely behind." Going on to say there are "heavenly harmonies dissolving into a menacing, stalkerish intensity."

== Track listing ==
Palberta5000 track listing
No.	Title	Length
1.	"No Way"	2:07
2.	"Big Bad Want"	3:44
3.	"Never to Go"	1:19
4.	"The Cow"	1:41
5.	"Fragile Place"	4:37
6.	"In Again"	1:36
7.	"Hey!"	1:32
8.	"Red Antz"	1:56
9.	"Summer Sun"	1:29
10.	"Eggs n' Bac'"	1:36
11.	"Corner Store"	2:31
12.	"I'm Z'done"	0:18
13.	"Something in the Way"	2:08
14.	"The Way That You Do"	2:27
15.	"All Over My Face"	4:57
16.	"Before I Got Here"	3:25
Total length:		37:27

== Personnel ==
Palberta

- Lily Konigsberg
- Anina Ivry-Block
- Nina Ryser

Additional contributors

- Bug – cover art
- Walter Wlodarczyk – portrait
- Matt Labozza – engineering
- Carl Saff – mastering
- Matt Norman – horn
