= Really From (album) =

Studio album by Really From
- Released: March 12, 2021
- Genre: Indie rock
- Length: 34:00
- Label: Topshelf

Really From chronology
Verse (2017)	Really From (2021)

Really From is the third and final studio album by American indie rock band Really From, released by Topshelf Records on March 12, 2021. It is the band's first album under their current name; they released two previous albums under their original name People Like You.

== Reception ==
Professional ratings
Review scores
Source	Rating
Our Culture Mag	4/5 stars
Pitchfork	7.8/10

In a review for Pitchfork, Charley Ruddell said that "fusing bookish indie jazz with emo and math rock, the Boston quartet explores the complications of identity while dismantling stale indie-rock paradigms".

Ian Cohen of Stereogum said that "Really From was intended as a testament not just to their diversity of experience but their collaborative experience as well".

== Track listing ==
No.	Title	Length
1.	"Apartment Song"	4:26
2.	"Quirk"	4:21
3.	"Yellow Fever"	3:27
4.	"Try Lingual"	3:18
5.	"I Live Here Now"	4:07
6.	"Last Kneeplay"	1:07
7.	"I'm from Here"	5:06
8.	"In the Spaces"	5:05
9.	"The House"	3:29
Total length:		34:00

== Personnel ==
- Chris Lee-Rodriguez – Vocals, Electric Guitar, Classical Guitar
- Sander Bryce – Drum Set
- Michi Tassey – Vocals, Piano, Keyboard, Synth Bass (Tracks 1 and 7)
- Matt Hull – Trumpet, Flugelhorn, Trombone
- Sai Boddupalli – Sound Design, Programming, Synth Bass (Tracks 2, 4–6, 8), Bass Guitar (Track 3)
