= Pom Poko (band) =

Norwegian post-punk band

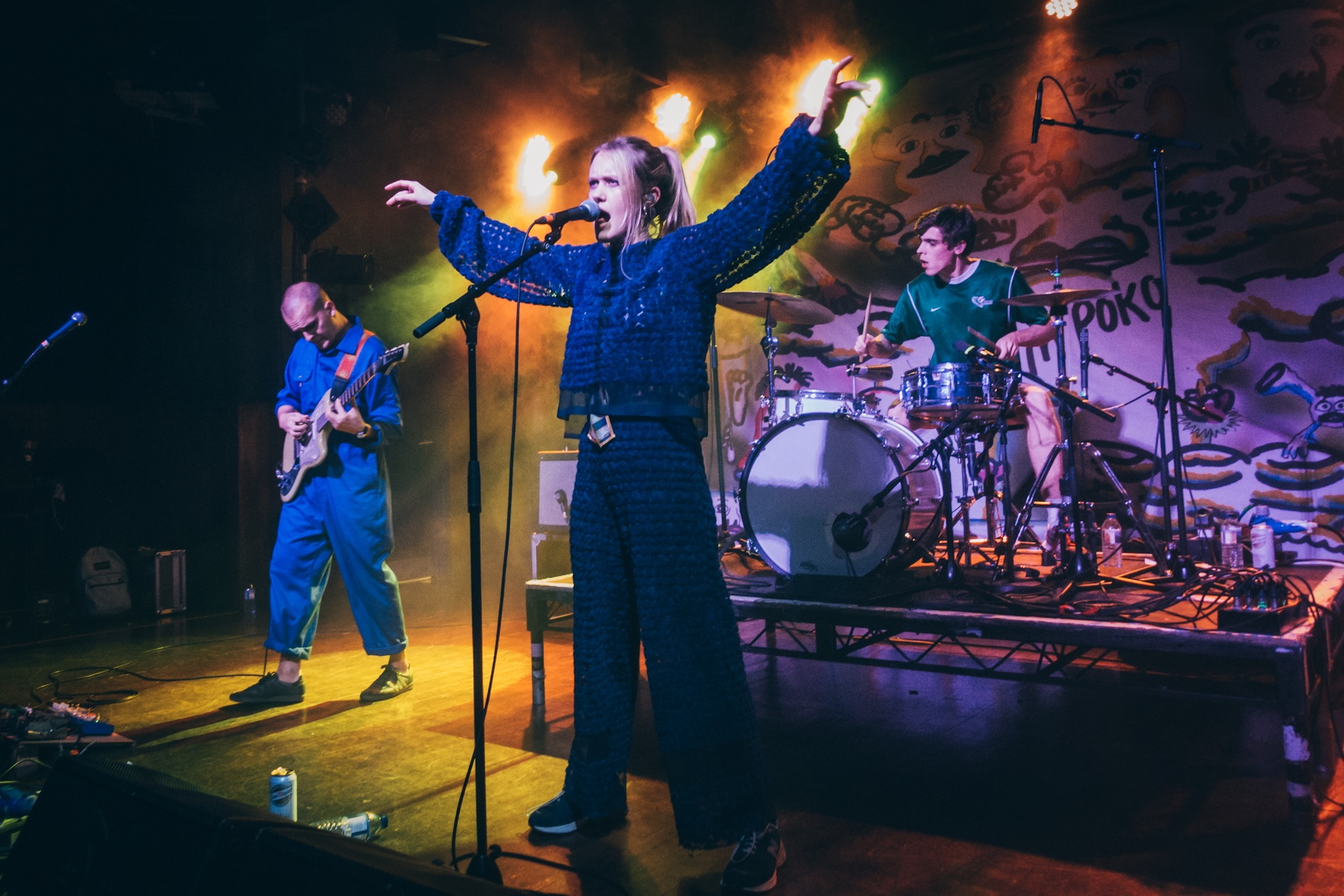
- Pom Poko performing in 2019

Background information
- Origin: Oslo, Norway
- Genres: Post-punk; Art rock
- Years active: 2017–present
- Labels: Bella Union
- Members: Ragnhild Fangel; Martin Tonne; Jonas Krøvel; Ola Djupvik
- Website: pompoko.no

Pom Poko is a Norwegian post punk band from Oslo, Norway. The band was formed in 2017 and quickly gained a reputation for their live shows, earning them a spot on NME's "100 Bands to Watch" list in 2018. Pom Poko signed to British label Bella Union in 2019, where they released their debut album, Birthday, to positive reviews. They released their second album, Cheater, to critical acclaim in 2021.

== History ==
Pom Poko was formed in 2017 and quickly gained a reputation for their live shows, earning them a spot on NME's "100 Bands to Watch" list that year. The group's members are trained as jazz musicians. In 2019, they signed to Bella Union. They released their debut album, Birthday, to positive reviews that same year. In 2021, they released their second album, Cheater, to critical acclaim.

The band is named after Pom Poko, a Japanese animated film released by Studio Ghibli in 1994. Lead guitarist Martin Tonne has cited K-pop and hyperpop as genre influences for the band; his performances incorporate "buzzes, metallic rattles, squeals and moans," contributing a distorted layer to the group's sound.

== Members ==
Current

- Ragnhild Fangel – lead vocals (2017–present)
- Martin Tonne – guitar (2017–present)
- Jonas Krøvel – bass (2017–present)
- Ola Djupvik – drums (2017–present)

== Discography ==
Albums

- Birthday (2019, Bella Union)
- Cheater (2021, Bella Union)
- Champion (2024, Bella Union)

EPs

- This Is Our House (2022, Bella Union)
