= TV Priest =

English rock band

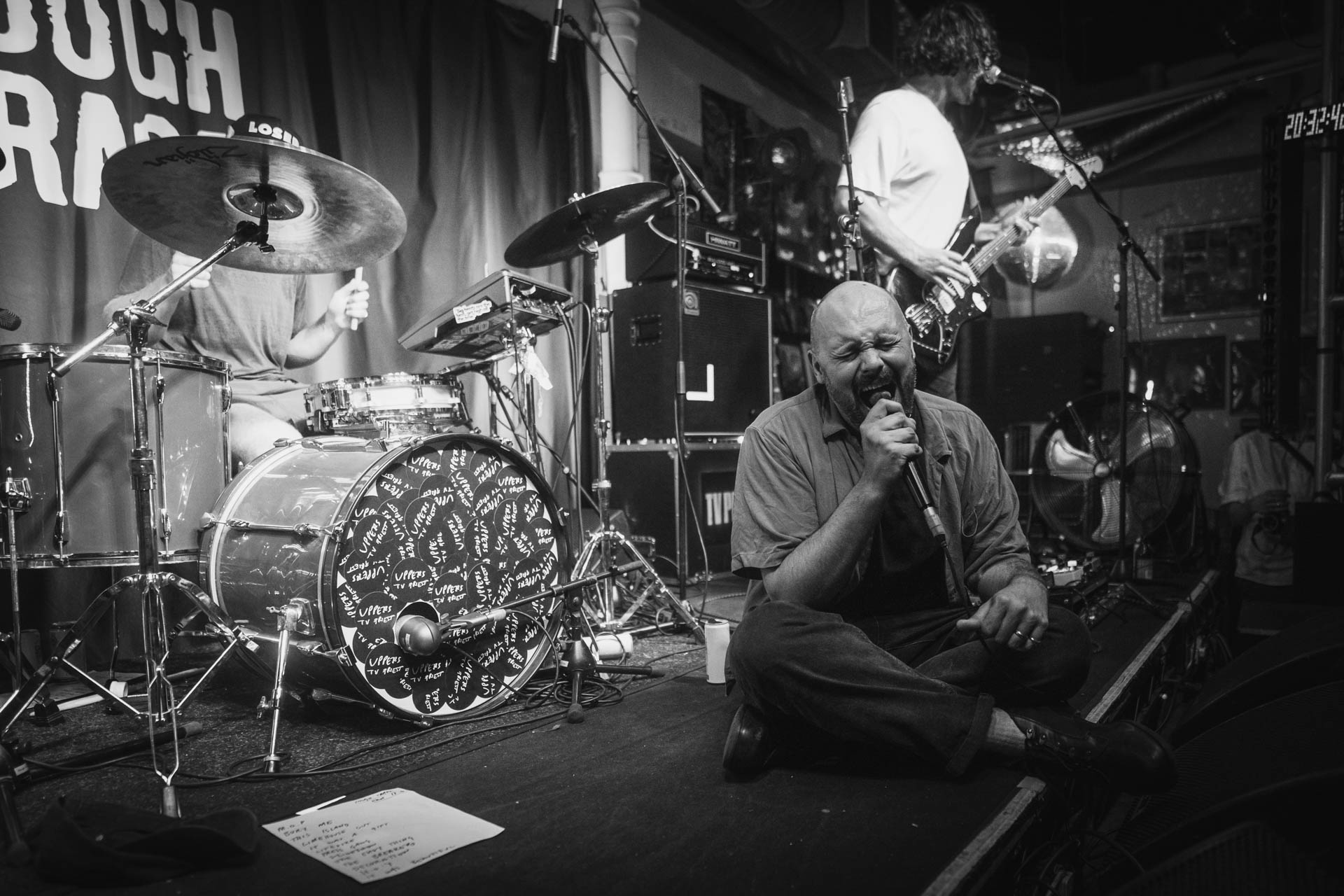
- TV Priest at Rough Trade in June 2022

Background information
- Origin: London, England
- Genres: Punk rock, post-punk, indie rock
- Years active: 2019-present
- Label: Sub Pop
- Members: Charlie Drinkwater (vocals); Alex Sprogis (guitar)
- Past members: Nic Bueth (bass and keyboards); Ed Kelland (drums)
- Website: tvpriest.com

TV Priest is an English rock band formed in London in 2019. Its music style has been associated with punk rock and post-punk.

They signed to Sub Pop after only having played one gig in an industrial freezer in November 2019, with other concerts cancelled due to the COVID-19 pandemic. Their debut album, Uppers, was released on 5 February 2021 by Sub Pop. On 17 June 2022, their second album My Other People was released by Sub Pop.

== Discography ==
=== Studio albums ===
- Uppers (2021, Sub Pop)
- My Other People (2022, Sub Pop)
- Cartoons (2026, AMK Distributed by Kartel Music Group)

=== Live Albums ===
- "Live in Seattle" (2022, Hand in Hive)

=== Singles ===
- "House of York" (2020, Hand in Hive)
- "Runner Up" (2020, Hand in Hive)
- "This Island" (2020, Sub Pop)
- "Slideshow" (2020, Sub Pop)
- "Decoration" (2020, Sub Pop)
- "Press Gang" (2021, Sub Pop)
- "Lifesize" (2021, Sub Pop)
- "One Easy Thing" (2022, Sub Pop)
- "Bury Me in My Shoes" (2022, Sub Pop)
- "Limehouse Cut" (2022, Sub Pop)
- "It Was Beautiful" (2022, Sup Pop)
- "The Mud Never Dries" (2026, AMK Distributed by Kartel Music Group)
- "Love Song (A Good Kind of Weapon)" (2026, AMK Distributed by Kartel Music Group)
