= Somewhere (Sun June album) =

Studio album by Sun June
- Released: February 5, 2021
- Genre: Dream pop
- Length: 40:44
- Label: Run for Cover

Sun June chronology
Years (2018)	Somewhere (2021)	Bad Dream Jaguar (2023)

Singles from Somewhere
- 1. "Singing" Released: September 2, 2020; 2. "Karen O" Released: October 13, 2020; 3. "Bad Girl" Released: December 10, 2020; 4. "Everything I Had" Released: January 10, 2021

Professional ratings
Aggregate scores
Source	Rating
Metacritic	73/100
Review scores
Source	Rating
AllMusic	3.5/5 stars
American Songwriter	3/5 stars
The Line of Best Fit	8/10
Pitchfork	6.8/10
Under the Radar	7.5/10

Somewhere is the second studio album by American indie pop band Sun June. It was released on February 5, 2021, by Run for Cover Records.

== Release ==
On September 2, 2020, the band announced they had signed to Run for Cover Records, and released the first single "Singing". Speaking about the single, lead vocalist Laura Colwell explained: "Singing is our groundhog day song. It’s about being stuck in an old argument with your partner, wishing you both saw the world the same way. The video expands on that idea by cycling through various mundane ruts we can get caught in. We also explore around our Austin neighborhood, where they’re tearing stuff down and building stuff up."

The second single "Karen O" was released on October 13, 2020. The band said the single "is one of the only songs we've written that takes place over the course of a single night, and we hope we captured what it feels like when you're completely worn out but can't bring yourself to go home and go to sleep. It's about the kind of night you let heartache swallow you whole, and you find yourself heading straight toward the things you should be running away from."

The third single "Bad Girl" was released on December 10, 2020. Speaking to Paste, the band said of the single: "There’s something pushing and pulling between the lyrics and the beat, so we thought a dance video might draw out some internal tension. We filmed around Lockhart, Texas, where we recorded the album, because there are so many farms and fields out there that are unchanged despite the area’s growth."

On January 10, 2021, Sun June released their fourth single "Everything I Had".

== Critical reception ==
Somewhere was met with "generally favorable" reviews from critics. At Metacritic, which assigns a weighted average rating out of 100 to reviews from mainstream publications, this release received an average score of 73 based on 7 reviews.

In a review for AllMusic, Marcy Donelson wrote: "With the feather-light vocals, sustained keyboard hum, and unadorned kick drum that open Somewhere, Sun June seem to pick up right where their stark and gentle 2018 debut, Years, left off. As it progresses, however, the sophomore album ventures into more-fully arranged, five-piece territory - potentially six with the touches of synths and percussion by producer Danny Reisch - a benchmark that wasn't reached on a debut recorded while some members were still learning their instruments." Hal Horowitz of American Songwriter said: "The eleven songs on the band’s second album stay on low boil as perfect vehicles for singer Laura Colwell’s airy, diffuse, often sexually charged, evocatively whispered vocals. The pensive music is a vehicle for haunting lyrics that examine love from the eyes of the participants who are caught up in the joy of newfound romance while somewhat leery and unsure about where it’s headed" Writing for The Line of Best Fit, Jay Singh gave the album an eight out of ten, praising "Colwell"s light, airy vocals", and the "heavenly melodies" of the guitars.

== Track listing ==
Somewhere track listing
No.	Title	Length
1.	"Bad with Time"	3:14
2.	"Everything I Had"	4:07
3.	"Singing"	3:00
4.	"Bad Girl"	4:08
5.	"Karen O"	3:17
6.	"Everywhere"	4:09
7.	"Once in a While"	4:15
8.	"Finding Out"	3:12
9.	"Seasons"	3:54
10.	"Real Thing"	4:25
11.	"Colors"	3:03

== Personnel ==
Musicians

- Michael Bain − guitar
- Stephen Salisbury – guitar
- Justin Harris – bass
- Laura Colwell – guitar, keyboards, vocals
- Sarah Schultz – drums

Production

- Danny Reisch – engineer, mixing, producer
- Evan Kaspar – engineer
- Matt Gerhard – engineer
