= Cheater (Pom Poko album) =

Studio album by Pom Poko
- Released: 15 January 2021
- Genre: Indie rock; noise pop
- Length: 33:02
- Label: Bella Union
- Producer: Pom Poko; Marcus Forsgren

Pom Poko chronology
Birthday (2019)	Cheater (2021)

Professional ratings
Aggregate scores
Source	Rating
AnyDecentMusic?	7.3/10
Metacritic	77/100
Review scores
Source	Rating
AllMusic	4/5 stars
Beats Per Minute	80%
Gigwise	8/10
The Line of Best Fit	7/10
NME	4/5 stars
Pitchfork	7.5/10

Cheater is the second studio album by Norwegian post-punk band Pom Poko. The album was originally scheduled for release on 6 November 2020, but was moved to 15 January 2021.

== Release ==
On 18 August 2020, Pom Poko announced the release of their second studio album, originally scheduled for release on 6 November 2020. However, due to the COVID-19 pandemic, the album's release date was moved to 15 January 2021.

=== Singles ===
Pom Poko released the first single from the album, "Andrew" on 18 August 2020.

On 15 September 2020, Pom Poko released the second single "My Candidacy". In a press release, the band explained the meaning of the song: "The song itself is about the wish to be able to believe in unconditional love, even though you know that there probably is no such thing. We, at least, believe in unconditional love for riffy tunes with sing-song choruses."

The third single "Like a Lady" was released on 11 November 2020.

== Critical reception ==
Cheater was met with "generally favorable" reviews from critics. At Metacritic, which assigns a weighted average rating out of 100 to reviews from mainstream publications, this release received an average score of 77 based on 8 reviews. At AnyDecentMusic?, the release was given a 7.3 out of 10 based on 10 reviews.

In a review for AllMusic, Heather Phares noted how the release sounds "looser and more cohesive", going on to say "It's not every day when a band makes a second album that's more thrilling than their debut, but Pom Poko aren't an everyday band." Tom Dibb of Gigwise rated the album an 8 out of 10, explaining it was "packed full of angelic voices, funky bass tones and heavy guitar riffs, Cheater is a brilliantly mish-mashed blending of genres." Drew Litowitz of Pitchfork stated: "The Norwegian quartet’s second album effortlessly waltzes between technical art-rock, dissonant post-punk, and pop’s irresponsible sugar high. Over the course of 33 minutes, Pom Poko capture the feeling of adorable debauchery. Though their second album, Cheater, may sound unserious at first, angst and snark bubble up through cutting riffs and heart-shaped chaos."

== Track listing ==
All tracks are written by Ragnhild Fangel Jamtveit, Martin Miguel Almagro Tonne, Jonas Krøvel, and Ola Djupvik.

Cheater track listing
No.	Title	Length
1.	"Cheater"	3:47
2.	"Like a Lady"	2:46
3.	"Andrew"	2:49
4.	"My Candidacy"	3:04
5.	"Danger Baby"	3:57
6.	"Andy Go to School"	3:12
7.	"Look"	3:21
8.	"Baroque Denial"	3:45
9.	"Curly Romance"	3:21
10.	"Body Level"	3:00
Total length:		33:02

== Personnel ==
Pom Poko

- Ragnhild Fangel – vocals, production
- Martin Tonne – guitar, percussion, synthesizer, vocals, production
- Jonas Krøvel – bass, synthesizer, production
- Ola Djupvik – drums, percussion, synthesizer, production

Additional personnel

- Marcus Forsgren – production, mixing, engineering
- George Tanderø – mastering
- Erlend Peder Kvam – cover art, design
