= Elise Davis =

American country musician

- Origin: Little Rock, Arkansas
- Genres: Country, folk, Americana
- Years active: 2016–present
- Website: www.elisedavis.com

Elise Davis is an American country musician from Little Rock, Arkansas.

== Career ==
Elise Davis began her career in 2016, releasing her first full-length album titled The Token. Davis released her second full-length album, Cactus, in September 2018.

In January 2021, Davis announced her third album titled Anxious. Happy. Chill., set for an April 16 release via Tone Tree Music.

== Discography ==
Studio albums

- The Token (2016, Make The Kill, Thirty Tigers)
- Cactus (2018)
- Anxious. Happy. Chill. (2021, Tone Tree)
