= Really From =

American band

- Really From in 2022

Background information
- Also known as: People Like You
- Origin: Boston, Massachusetts
- Genres: Indie pop, jazz, emo, math rock
- Years active: 2014–2022 (on hiatus)
- Label: Topshelf Records
- Past members: Chris Lee-Rodriguez; Michi Tassey; Matt Hull; Sander Bryce; Sai Boddupali; Nick Koechel

Really From was an American band from Boston, Massachusetts, originally known as People Like You. Their final album, Really From, was released in March 2021. Their sound has been described as mixing indie pop, jazz, emo, and math rock. They referred to their own sound as "indie jazz".

== History ==
The band was formed as People Like You in 2014, by singer/guitarist Chris Lee-Rodriguez and drummer Sander Bryce, both graduates of Berklee College of Music. Singer/keyboardist Michi Tassey and trumpeter Matt Hull, also Berklee graduates, were originally special guests on some songs but were later added as full members. Bassist Nick Koechel played on their first album; he was temporarily replaced by Sai Boddupali.

They received early social media notice for their eclectic mix of styles. As People Like You, they released the albums "This Is What You Learned" in 2014 and Verse in 2017. The latter album was noted for its "fusion of jazz musicianship, emo spirit, and indie-pop tunefulness." Many of their songs discuss issues faced by mixed-race and multi-ethnic persons in America.

For legal reasons that the band chooses not to disclose, they changed their name to Really From in 2018. Under this name, they released a self-titled album in 2021. Reviewers praised the album for its "nuanced, uncompromising instrumentation" and for its intelligent lyrics on self-identity, culture, and social traumas. Bassist Sai Boddupali rejoined the band shortly after the album's release.

In July 2022, the band announced their intention to take an indefinite hiatus following two farewell shows in the fall, citing their desire to "maintain the integrity of what this project has become" at a "point in our lives when we want different things for themselves." They played two farewell shows in Somerville, Massachusetts and Brooklyn, New York in November 2022.

== Members ==
Former members

- Chris Lee-Rodriguez – guitar, vocals (2014–2022)
- Michi Tassey – keyboards, vocals (2014–2022)
- Sander Bryce – drums, percussion (2014–2022)
- Matt Hull – trumpet, flugelhorn (2014–2022)
- Sai Boddupalli – bass (2015–2018; 2021–2022)
- Nick Koechel – bass (2014–2016)

== Discography ==
=== Albums ===
As People Like You

- "This Is What You Learned" (2014)
- Verse (2017)

As Really From

- Really From (2021)
