= Palberta =

American indie rock band from New York City

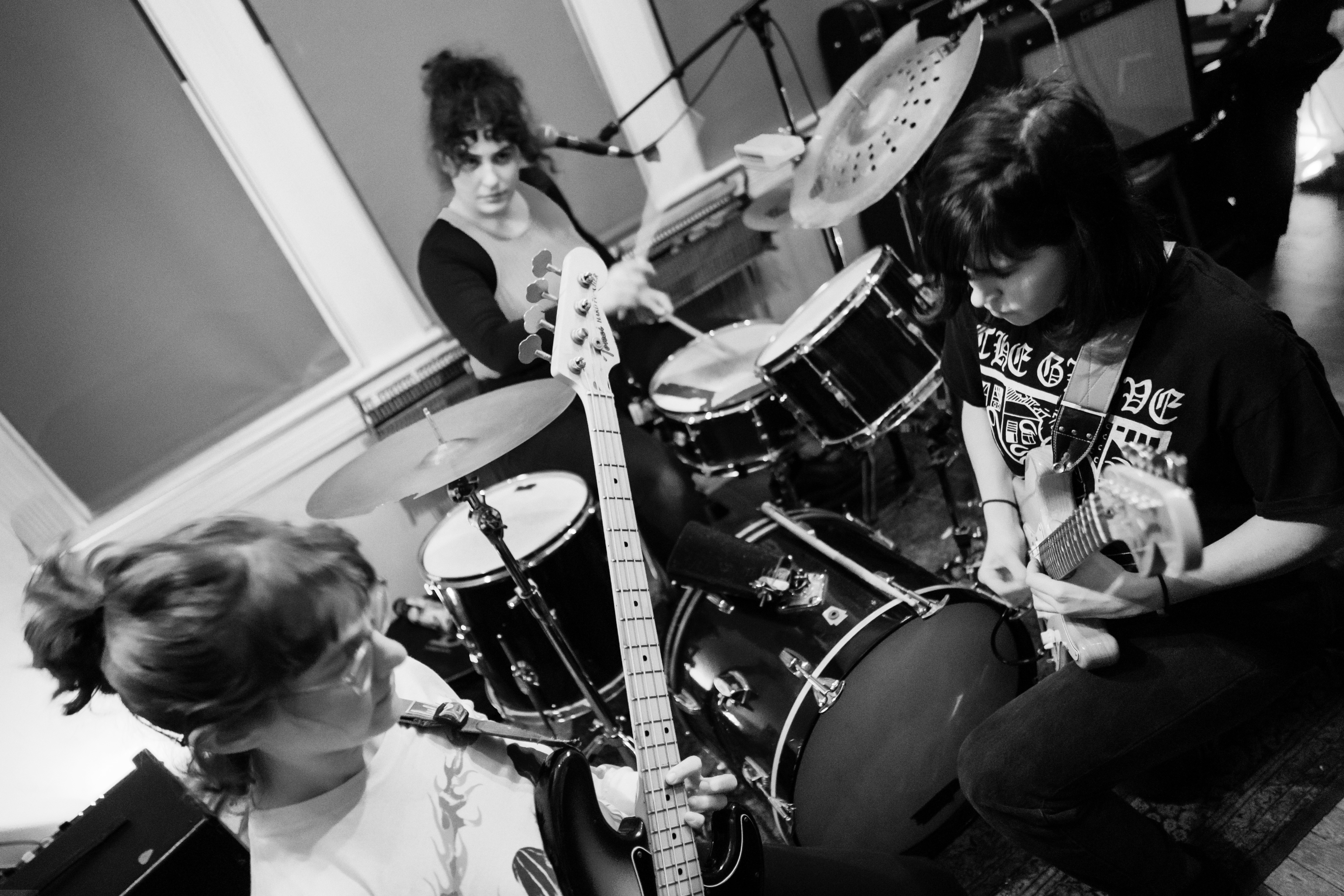
- Palberta in Washington DC, 2019

Background information
- Origin: New York City
- Genre: Indie rock
- Years active: 2013-present
- Label: Wharf Cat
- Website: Bandcamp

Palberta was an American indie rock band from New York City.

== History ==
Palberta began when all three members were studying at Bard College. Their first full-length album, My Pal Berta, was released in 2013, with voices "oscillating between sweet and scary".

Palberta released their second full-length album in 2014 titled Shitheads In The Ditch, in which "you never know when their playfulness will turn against you". In 2015, Palberta and the band No One and the Somebodies released a split album titled Chips For Dinner.

In 2017, Palberta released their third full-length, Bye Bye Berta. In 2018, they released their fourth full-length album, Roach Goin' Down, "like binge-watching a cult TV show". The trio's next album, Palberta5000, was released on January 22, 2021.

== Band members ==
- Lily Konigsberg
- Anina Ivry-Block
- Nina Ryser

== Discography ==
=== Studio albums ===
- My Pal Berta (2013, OSR Tapes)
- Shitheads In The Ditch (2014, OSR Tapes)
- Bye Bye Berta (2016, Wharf Cat)
- Roach Goin' Down (2018, Wharf Cat)
- Palberta5000 (2021, Wharf Cat)

=== Splits ===
- Palberta / No One And The Somebodies - Chips For Dinner (Underdog Pop Records)
- Palberta / New England Patriots - Special Worship (Feeding Tube Records)
