= Lily Konigsberg =

American musician and singer-songwriter

Lily Konigsberg is an American musician. She is a member of the band Palberta. She is also one of the two members of My Idea, along with Nate Amos of Water from Your Eyes. Konigsberg just released (9/22/2026) her first single since 2022 called Free Byrd.

== Discography ==
=== Albums ===
With Andrea Schiavelli - Good Time Now (Ramp Local, 2017)

- Lily We Need to Talk Now (Wharf Cat Records, 2021)

=== Singles & EPs ===
- 4 Picture Tear Cassette (Ramp Local, 2018)
- It's Just Like All The Clouds (Wharf Cat Records, 2020)
- Free Byrd (Wharf Cat Records, 2026)

=== Compilations ===
- The Best of Lily Konigsberg Right Now (Wharf Cat Records, 2021)
