= Uppers (album) =

Studio album by TV Priest
- Released: 5 February 2021
- Studio: Studio East (London)
- Genre: Post-punk
- Length: 43:50
- Label: Sub Pop
- Producer: Nic Bueth

TV Priest chronology
Uppers (2021)	My Other People (2022)

Singles from Uppers
- 1. "This Island" Released: 17 August 2020; 2. "Slideshow" Released: 23 September 2020; 3. "Decoration" Released: 28 October 2020; 4. "Press Gang" Released: 5 January 2021

Uppers is the debut studio album by the English post-punk band TV Priest, released on 5 February 2021 by Sub Pop.

== Background and recording ==
TV Priest initially self-released their standalone singles "House of York" in April 2020, followed by "Runner Up" in May 2020. Uppers was initially set for release on independent label Hand in Hive in November 2020 before begin pushed back to 5 February 2021 after the band signed to Sub Pop. The album was produced by Nic Bueth and recorded in East London.

== Release ==
On 17 August 2020, TV Priest announced the release of their debut album, along with the single "This Island". Lead singer Charlie Drinkwater said the single is "about incoherence and inarticulate responses, both personal and political, in a time and place you don’t fully understand anymore. We wrote this to an increasingly nationalistic and isolationist drumbeat playing out at home and abroad, and frankly we are scared and appalled".

The second single "Sllideshow" was released on 23 September 2020.

On 28 October 2020, TV Priest announced they had signed to Sub Pop, and released their third single "Decoration".

The fourth single "Press Gang" was released on 5 January 2021, and is inspired by Drinkwater's grandfather’s life’s work as a photojournalist and war correspondent on the UK’s Fleet Street from the 1950s to the early 1980s. The music video for the track was directed by Joe Wheatley.

== Tour ==
In support of the album, TV Priest tour began in July 2021 at London's Oslo nightclub, and finished in November 2021 at Heartbreakers Bar in Southampton.

== Critical reception ==
Professional ratings
Aggregate scores
Source	Rating
AnyDecentMusic?	7/10
Metacritic	69/100
Review scores
Source	Rating
AllMusic	3.5/5 stars
Beats Per Minute	74%
Clash	6/10
DIY	2.5/5 stars
Kerrang!	3/5 stars
MusicOMH	4/5 stars
NME	6.0/10 stars
Pitchfork	7.0/10 stars
Dork	4/5 stars

Uppers was met with "generally favorable" reviews from critics. At Metacritic, which assigns a weighted average rating out of 100 to reviews from mainstream publications, this release received an average score of 69 based on 10 reviews. AnyDecentMusic? gave the release a 7 out of 10 based on a critical consensus of 12 reviews.

Stuart Berman of Pitchfork gave the album a score of 7.0, and praised the progression of the album, writing that it evolves "from a band you think you’ve heard a million times before into one you feel like you’re just getting to know". Mark Deming of AllMusic gave the album a 3.5 out of 5, praising the vocals by Charlie Drinkwater as having a "strong voice and a subtly intelligent phrasing to his rants". At DIY, Lisa Wright gave the release a 2.5 out of 5, noting "TV Priest’s debut is good but not necessarily enough to poke through the maelstrom quite yet." Writing for Beats Per Minute, Gareth O'Malley wrote "Uppers provides thrills aplenty from a band making their mark during strange times as our new normal sets in, intent on seizing their second chance." Josh Crow of Clash wrote that the debut has "a collection of delightfully pungent tracks, delivered in all their unashamed, reckless glory."

== Track listing ==
All tracks are written by TV Priest.

No.	Title	Length
1.	"The Big Curve"	4:56
2.	"Press Gang"	3:00
3.	"Leg Room"	3:33
4.	"Journal of a Plague Year"	3:20
5.	"History Week"	2:03
6.	"Decoration"	4:31
7.	"Slideshow"	3:07
8.	"Fathers and Sons"	3:36
9.	"the ref"	0:50
10.	"Powers of Ten"	4:09
11.	"This Island"	4:09
12.	"Saintless"	7:06
Total length:		43:50

== Personnel ==
TV Priest

- Alex Sprogis – guitar, sound design
- Charlie Drinkwater – vocals
- Nic Bueth – bass, guitar, synthesizers, sound design, production, mixing, recording
- Ed Kelland – drums

Additional contributors

- Kevin Tuffy – mastering
- Morgan Hill-Murphy – cover photography

== Charts ==
Chart performance for Uppers
Chart (2021)	Peak position
Scottish Albums (OCC)	35
