= Skullcrusher =

Singer-songwriter

Background information
- Born: Tarrytown, New York, U.S.
- Genres: Indie folk, psychedelic folk
- Occupation: Singer-songwriter
- Years active: 2019–present
- Label: Secretly Canadian
- Website: www.skullcrusher.online

Helen Ballentine, known professionally as Skullcrusher, is an American indie folk singer-songwriter and musician.

== History ==
Ballentine was born and raised in Westchester County, New York, Ballentine attended the Hackley School, graduating in 2013. Ballantine moved to Los Angeles to attend college, graduating from the University of Southern California with a degree in graphic design in 2017. Having played piano for most of her life, Ballentine decided to quit her job working at a gallery to pursue music full time. In 2019, Ballentine wrote her first song, "Places/Plans," which was later released on 21 April 2020. Upon the release of the single, Ballentine announced her debut self-titled EP, released on 24 July 2020 via Secretly Canadian. The EP and subsequent releases feature production contributions from Los Angeles musician Noah Weinman, known professionally as Runnner. A second song from the EP, "Day of Show," was released on 27 May 2020. On 19 October 2020, Ballentine released a pair of singles entitled "Farm b/w Lift"; "Farm" is an original Skullcrusher song, while "Lift" is a cover of an outtake from Radiohead's album, OK Computer. For these singles, Ballentine used nostalgic samples from her childhood growing up on the East Coast of the United States, including crickets, cicadas, the beach in Connecticut, and the creaking of old homes. "Farm" was recorded around the Woodstock area of upstate New York. Ballentine released "Song for Nick Drake" on February 1, 2021.

Her debut album, Quiet the Room, was released on October 14, 2022.

== Reception ==
Mark Beaumont in The Guardian described Skullcrusher's sound as "Gorgeously gauzy alt-folk paeans haunted by the pale ghosts of pianos and acoustic guitars that drowned many years ago in a Laurel Canyon lagoon", commenting that the band's name suggests something altogether more violent. Alex Robert Ross from The Fader described Ballentines sound as "It’s a deft record, tranquil on its surface but torrid underneath, its loosely strummed acoustic guitars and vaporous melodies rooted to the ground by probing lyrics." Independent music website Pitchfork rated the EP a score of 7.1 upon its release saying "the acoustic confessionalism of her debut EP Skullcrusher isn't terribly original, it is nonetheless lovely, captivating, and quietly devastating."

== Discography ==
=== Albums ===
- Quiet the Room (2022)
- And Your Song is Like a Circle (2025)

=== EPs ===
- Skullcrusher (2020)
- Storm in Summer (2021)

=== Singles ===
- "Farm" b/w "Lift" (2020)
- "Song for Nick Drake" (2021)
- "Cloudy Shoes" (2021)
- "Whatever Fits Together" (2022)
- "They Quiet the Room" b/w "Quiet the Room" (2022)
- "It's Like a Secret" (2022)
- "Word Comes Back" (2023)
- "Exhale" (2025)
- "March" (2025)
- "Dragon" (2025)
