= All the Right Noises (album) =

Studio album by Thunder
- Released: 12 March 2021
- Recorded: July and November 2019; January 2020
- Studio: Rockfield Studios
- Genre: Hard rock
- Length: 48:21
- Label: BMG
- Producer: Luke Morley

Thunder chronology
Please Remain Seated (2019)	All the Right Noises (2021)	Dopamine (2022)

Professional ratings
Review scores
Source	Rating
Classic Rock	4/5 stars
Metal Hammer	5.5/7

All the Right Noises is the thirteenth studio album by English hard rock band Thunder, released on 12 March 2021 through BMG Rights Management. The band promoted the album with an online live special broadcast on 13 March 2021, and are scheduled to support the album with a tour of the UK from May 2021.

== Cover art ==
The album cover is a photograph of the Singing Ringing Tree sculpture in Lancashire, England, which guitarist Luke Morley found after Googling "bizarre musical instruments" for inspiration.

== Commercial performance ==
All the Right Noises placed at number three on the UK Albums Chart and achieved top 10 status in Germany and Switzerland.

== Track listing ==
All the Right Noises track listing
No.	Title	Length
1.	"Last One Out Turn Off the Lights"	4:14
2.	"Destruction"	5:01
3.	"The Smoking Gun"	4:49
4.	"Going to Sin City"	3:56
5.	"Don't Forget to Live Before You Die"	4:22
6.	"I'll Be the One"	4:28
7.	"Young Man"	5:53
8.	"You're Gonna Be My Girl"	4:12
9.	"St. George's Day"	4:03
10.	"Force of Nature"	4:06
11.	"She's a Millionairess"	3:17
Total length:		48:21

Deluxe edition bonus disc
No.	Title	Length
1.	"Firebird"	4:13
2.	"Hero"	4:12
3.	"The Fires That Roar"	4:23
4.	"Pariah"	4:36
5.	"You're Gonna Be My Girl" (live)	4:25
6.	"Destruction" (live)	6:59
7.	"Last One Out Turn Off the Lights" (live)	4:25
8.	"Don't Forget to Live Before You Die" (live)	4:43
9.	"Going to Sin City" (live)	4:07
10.	"I'll Be the One" (live)	4:35
11.	"She's a Millionairess" (live)	4:14
12.	"Young Man" (live)	6:35
Total length:		58:29

== Charts ==
Chart performance for All the Right Noises
Chart (2021)	Peak position
Austrian Albums (Ö3 Austria)	24
Belgian Albums (Ultratop Flanders)	87
Belgian Albums (Ultratop Wallonia)	52
Dutch Albums (Album Top 100)	70
French Albums (SNEP)	196
German Albums (Offizielle Top 100)	9
Japanese Albums (Oricon)	59
Scottish Albums (OCC)	1
Spanish Albums (PROMUSICAE)	51
Swedish Vinyl Albums (Sverigetopplistan)	2
Swiss Albums (Schweizer Hitparade)	10
UK Albums (OCC)	3
UK Rock & Metal Albums (OCC)	1
