= Sun June =

American indie pop band

Sun June is an American indie pop band from Austin, Texas.

== Overview ==
Formed in Austin, Texas, Sun June released their first full-length album in 2018 titled Years via Keeled Scales. In October 2020, the group announced their second full-length album. The group released that album, Somewhere, in 2021 through Keeled Scales and Run for Cover. In 2023 they released their third album, Bad Dream Jaguar, which was influenced by Feist, Frank Ocean, Loma, and Caroline Says. Their third album was created while Colwell and Salisbury lived 1,300 miles apart, sending demos back and forth.

== Band members ==
- Laura Colwell – Vocals
- Michael Bain – Guitar
- Justin Harris – Bass
- Sarah Schultz – Drums
- Stephen Salisbury - Guitar

== Discography ==
=== Studio albums ===
- Years (2018, Keeled Scales)
- Somewhere (2021, Keeled Scales, Run for Cover)
- Bad Dream Jaguar (2023, Run for Cover)
