= Tearjerker (band) =

Canadian indie rock band based in Toronto, Ontario

- Origin: Toronto, Ontario, Canada
- Genres: Indie rock, dream pop
- Years active: 2006–present
- Labels: SQE, Sore Thumb, Almost Communist
- Members: Micah Bonte; Trevor Hawkins; Taylor Shute
- Website: tearjerker.ca

Tearjerker is a Canadian indie rock band based in Toronto, Ontario, consisting of Micah Bonte (vocals, guitar), Trevor Hawkins (drums, samples, production), and Taylor Shute (guitar, bass, vocals, keyboards).

The band's music has been described as 'shoegaze' and 'dream pop'.

== History ==
Tearjerker was formed in Toronto in 2009. They released the albums Strangers (2010, re-recorded as Strangers Remade in 2011) and Rare (2011).

In 2014, they self-released the EP Hiding, which was later picked up by SQE Music.

The band's latest album, Stay Wild, was released in 2015. Stay Wild received an 8/10 rating from PopMatters.

== Discography ==
=== Albums ===
- Slouching (July 2009), Sore Thumb
- Strangers (November 2010), Sore Thumb/Sweat Lodge Guru
- Strangers Remade (May 2011), Sore Thumb
- Rare (November 2011), Sore Thumb
- Stay Wild (2015), Almost Communist
- Faded (2019), Almost Communist
- This Is Really All We Need (2024), Tearjerker

=== EPs ===
- Worries (2007), Sore Thumb
- Hiding (August 2014), SQE
- Hiding With Friends (2015), Almost Communist
- Really Into You (2016), Almost Communist

=== Featured appearances ===
- Toronto's Loveless (My Bloody Valentine cover album) by Various artists (2011), Gold Soundz blog (on track "Sometimes")
