= West One Music Group =

British global production music company

- Trade name: West One
- Formerly: West One Music Group
- Traded as: Independent
- Industry: production music
- Founded: 2003 (in Soho, London, England)
- Founder: Richard Harvey, Tony Prior, Edwin Cox
- Headquarters: London, W1; United Kingdom
- Area served: Worldwide
- Key people: Edwin Cox
- Divisions: And Then Some, Asia Record Collective, Electronic Dance Series, Fired Earth Music, Kaptain Music, Little Assembly, Real to Reel, Refuel Music, The Scoring House, SOMOS, West One Music, Zero Degrees

West One is a British global music house and production music company. Founded in Soho, London, in 2003, the group consists of twelve labels, including And Then Some, Asia Record Collective, Electronic Dance Series, Fired Earth Music, Kaptain Music, Little Assembly, Real to Reel, Refuel Music, The Scoring House, SOMOS, West One Music and Zero Degrees. Recording live music in locations around the world, including Abbey Road Studios, West One Music Group focuses on writing and producing music for use in media.

Adding to offices and in-house recording facilities in London, Los Angeles, Munich, Paris, Hong Kong and Bangkok, the company expanded into the United States, in January, 2016, with offices in Los Angeles and New York, to deliver music directly to US clients. West One Music Group is deeply ingrained in the history of the British music scene and boasts connections through its co-founder, Richard Harvey, with Hans Zimmer, John Williams, and The Who, among others.

== West One Music ==
West One Music is the signature label within West One Music Group and releases music across a wide range of genres, placed in programmes aired on Sky Living, Showtime, ABC. The label also releases 'Artist Focus' albums intended to deliver commercial music for media use. Previous albums have featured artists such as George Timothy and London rock band Gem & The Deadheads, and Perfect Shadow is the latest release from LA-based, Greek-born singer-songwriter Kid Moxie.

Amber Carrington of The Voice USA was featured on a 2014 album released on West One Music, Country Pop.

== The Scoring House ==
The Scoring House features music composed and produced for corporate films and documentaries. The Scoring House is produced by Peter Cox, former managing director of EMI's label KPM.

== Fired Earth Music ==
Fired Earth Music is an LA-based label focusing on music for blockbuster trailers and TV promos. BAFTA award-winning film Ex Machina was promoted using "Siren of the Damned" and "Submerged" from the album SoundDesign Vol.2. "Infinite, Immortal" was used by British dance troupe UDI for their performances on Britain's Got Talent.

== SOMOS ==
SOMOS, is West One Music's Latin America-focused label, launched in January 2016, is one of West One Music Group's collection of independent labels, created in partnership with Colombian-born producer Felipe Arévalo. The music released on the SOMOS label is recorded in and around Latin America and is composed and produced entirely by Latin American musicians. The first release on the label, Os Jogos, was created with the Rio 2016 Olympic Games in mind, in partnership with Brazilian producer Comando S. The resulting album was described as "inspirational, vibrant and emotive Brazilian music for sports, action and leisure" by Brazil Music Exchange.

Since its release, SOMOS has had multiple nominations for its albums in local and international award ceremonies, including The Lukas (2018 - "Album of The Year" Nominee; 2019 - "Album of The Year" two nominations), The Mark Awards (2018 - "Best Use of Production Music in Commercial Advertisement" nominee), The Production Music Awards (2019 - "Best Use of Production Music in Commercial Advertisement" nominee) and the Jerry Goldsmith Awards (2018 - "Best Score for a Free Creation Form" nominee).

== Little Assembly ==
Little Assembly is an independent commercial label—a later-added part of West One Music Group, broadening their music offering, with Edwin Cox as Creative Director and Adam Le Blanc as Head of A&R. An independent commercial label, Little Assembly focuses on experimental, often left-field pop music. Little Assembly launched in July 2017 with its first artist, Anna Lann. Anna Lann's single, "Moist" was the first release from the label, premiered by Bob Boilen of NPR Music. Anna Lann's previous releases had premiered with Wonderland.
