= Dragon New Warm Mountain I Believe in You =

Studio album by Big Thief
- Released: February 11, 2022
- Recorded: April–December 2020
- Studios: The Elf Inn (Westhampton, Massachusetts); Flying Cloud (Upstate New York); Five Star (Topanga, California); MusicGardens – Studio in the Clouds (Colorado); Press On (Tucson, Arizona)
- Genres: Indie folk; folk rock; Americana; country rock
- Length: 80:13
- Label: 4AD
- Producer: James Krivchenia

Big Thief chronology
Two Hands (2019)	Dragon New Warm Mountain I Believe in You (2022)	Double Infinity (2025)

Singles from Dragon New Warm Mountain I Believe in You
- 1. "Little Things" / "Sparrow" Released: August 10, 2021; 2. "Certainty" Released: September 7, 2021; 3. "Change" Released: October 6, 2021; 4. "Time Escaping" Released: November 16, 2021; 5. "No Reason" / "Spud Infinity" Released: December 14, 2021; 6. "Simulation Swarm" Released: January 19, 2022

Dragon New Warm Mountain I Believe in You is the fifth studio album by the American band Big Thief, released as a double album through 4AD on February 11, 2022. Produced by drummer James Krivchenia, the album features 20 songs which were recorded over five months in five locations across the United States. The album was supported by six singles. It is also the last album to feature bassist and founding member Max Oleartchik before his departure in 2024.

It received universal acclaim from critics upon release and entered the top forty in several territories, including Australia, Germany, Ireland, Portugal, New Zealand, the United States, and the United Kingdom; it reached the top ten of the albums charts in Belgium and the Netherlands. The album was nominated for Best Alternative Music Album at the 65th Annual Grammy Awards.

== Background ==
In 2019, Big Thief left Saddle Creek and signed to 4AD, releasing two studio albums: U.F.O.F. in May 2019 and Two Hands in October 2019. The albums were the band's most successful and acclaimed to date: U.F.O.F. received a nomination for the Grammy Award for Best Alternative Music Album and both albums appeared on the Billboard 200 chart, with Two Hands peaking at 113. Their song "Not" from Two Hands was named by many publications as one of the year's best songs and was nominated for Best Rock Song and Best Rock Performance at the 63rd Annual Grammy Awards. Big Thief toured in support of the albums until March 2020, when their European tour was canceled due to the COVID-19 pandemic. Drummer James Krivchenia released a solo album titled A New Found Relaxation in June 2020. In October 2020, Adrianne Lenker released two solo albums: Songs and Instrumentals. Guitarist Buck Meek released his second solo album Two Saviors in January 2021.

== Recording and production ==
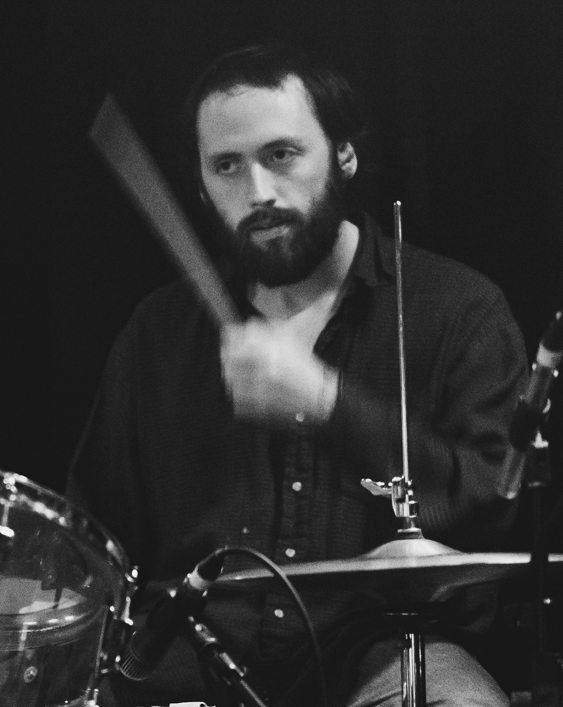
Drummer James Krivchenia produced the album.

Dragon New Warm Mountain I Believe in You album was produced by drummer James Krivchenia, who conceived the concept behind its recording. In late 2019, while at a hotel in Copenhagen, Krivchenia presented the band with the concept that they would travel to four locations: Upstate New York, Topanga Canyon in California, the Sonoran Desert in Arizona, and the Colorado mountains. They would record at four studios with four engineers, and go to each place with a specific sonic plan in mind. Krivchenia's intent was to capture a full expression of Lenker's songwriting and the band onto a single album. Krivchenia's production handling also marks the band's first album not produced by their longtime collaborator Andrew Sarlo.

The band recorded over the span of five months, resulting in 45 complete songs, which were ultimately edited down to the album's 20 tracks. As a result of the COVID-19 pandemic, the band initially quarantined in the Vermont woods for two weeks in July 2020. The first session was in July and August 2020 at Sam Evian's Flying Cloud Recordings in Upstate New York. The second session was with Shawn Everett in October 2020 at Five Star Studios in Topanga, California. The third session was with engineer Dom Monks, who previously engineered U.F.O.F. and Two Hands; the session took place in November 2020 at MusicGardens – Studio In The Clouds in the Rocky Mountains of Colorado, located just outside Telluride. The fourth and final session was in December 2020 at Scott McMicken's Press On Studio in Tucson, Arizona. Mat Davidson, a former member of the Low Anthem and a longtime friend of the band who performs under the moniker Twain, was invited to contribute to the recordings in Arizona. Davidson had previously featured on the band's second studio album, Capacity (2017), with his vocals and fiddle performances featuring heavily throughout the Arizona Dragon New Warm Mountain recordings, marking the first time the band incorporated a fifth instrumentalist for such a substantial contribution. The album also features recordings from a fifth location, in April 2020 at The Elf Inn in Westhampton, Massachusetts.

== Release and promotion ==
On April 22, 2021, Lenker announced a series of solo tour dates for November and December 2021. On May 11, 2021, Big Thief announced North American tour dates for September and October 2021. On June 8, 2021, the band announced a European tour from January–March 2022. However, the European tour dates were rescheduled.

On August 10, 2021, Big Thief released the songs "Little Things" and "Sparrow". The singles marked the band's first new music since the release of the 2020 single "Love in Mine", an outtake from Two Hands. On September 7, 2021, the band released another song, titled "Certainty", followed by another, named "Change", on October 6. They also announced plans for a North American tour slated for April and May 2022.

In the November 2021 issue of Mojo, Big Thief revealed plans to release a 20-track double album in early 2022. On November 16, 2021, the band confirmed the album's title Dragon New Warm Mountain I Believe in You and scheduled release on February 11, 2022. "Time Escaping" was released as a single the same day. On December 14, 2021, Big Thief released the singles "No Reason" and "Spud Infinity". On January 19, 2022, "Simulation Swarm" was released as the album's final single.

== Title ==
The album shares its name with its title track "Dragon New Warm Mountain I Believe in You", which Lenker first performed live in January 2019. The track's lyrics mention "a dragon in the phone line" and a "new warm mountain where the stone face forms and speaks". In the chorus, Lenker sings: "I believe in you / Even when you need to / Recoil".

Similar lyrics also appear in Lenker's song "Anything", from her solo album Songs (2020): "Dragon in the new warm mountain / Didn't you believe in me?".

== Critical reception ==
Professional ratings
Aggregate scores
Source	Rating
AnyDecentMusic?	8.4/10
Metacritic	88/100
Review scores
Source	Rating
AllMusic	3.5/5 stars
And It Don't Stop	A
Exclaim!	9/10
The Independent	5/5 stars
Mojo	4/5 stars
NME	4/5 stars
Pitchfork	9.0/10
Rolling Stone	3.5/5 stars
The Times	4/5 stars
Uncut	9/10

Dragon New Warm Mountain I Believe in You was released to widespread acclaim. At Metacritic, which assigns a normalized rating out of 100 to reviews from professional critics, the album received an average score of 88, based on 26 reviews, which indicates "universal acclaim". Aggregator AnyDecentMusic? gave it 8.4 out of 10, based on their assessment of the critical consensus.

Giving Dragon New Warm Mountain... an "A" grade, veteran critic Robert Christgau expressed overwhelming praise of the lyrics while finding the music to be a vast improvement over the band's previous albums, particularly in its melodic and guitar qualities: "With no loss of Lenker's haunting trademark delicacy, Big Thief is louder here, and rocks more in a clattering kind of way." Pitchfork reviewer Andy Cush called the album a "20-song epic of kaleidoscopic invention, striking beauty, and wigged-out humor, rambling far beyond the bounds of their previous work." Peter Watts of Uncut hailed it as a "landmark" album, writing that "Adrianne Lenker's genius has fully blossomed on this monumental double LP, which seamlessly blends her ambiguous melodies and absorbing narratives with a yearning for classic Americana and the band's indie-rock leanings." Ethan Shanfeld of Variety praised the album's "spirit of experimentation," writing, "If the ethereal folk of U.F.O.F. and earthy indie-rock of Two Hands indicated each end of Big Thief's sonic spectrum, Dragon posits an entirely new axis." James McNair of Mojo praised the album's "admirable ambition" but criticized its lack of stylistic cohesion as being jarring at times. Helen Brown of The Independent found it superior to the band's many "arty folk rocker" peers while praising Lenker's "questing outward gaze and quirky lyrical choices" and her "beady-eyed magpie knack for catchy melodies". Kaelen Bell of Exclaim! was impressed by the sonic diversity, observing that the songs "feel in conversation rather than competition, linked by the band's near-mythic symbiosis and Lenker's durable writing. Her songs are stretched, knotted and vaporized across the record, buried in instrumentation and effects on "Time Escaping" and "Flower of Blood" only to be dusted clean, naked as the day on the spellbinding "The Only Place" or "Promise Is a Pendulum"." Writing for No Depression, John Amen said it shows Lenker to be "one of the more gifted melodists, subtly versatile singers, and liberated lyricists of her generation", in a showcase of the band's "encyclopedic absorption and seminal reconfiguration of diverse genres and subgenres as well as production styles ranging from lo-fi to hi-fi, from the garage-y to the celestial".

Some reviewers were more reserved in their praise. Marcy Donelson of AllMusic expressed reluctance to call the album "a failed experiment, as it's loaded with gems – including some of Big Thief's most free-spirited work to date", but added that "it lands much more like a showreel than a plotted album". Tony Inglis of The Skinny wrote that the "highs here are some of the highest in the band's prolific discography", and praised the "beguiling" experimentation on the tracks "Heavy Bend", "Blurred View", "Little Things", "Time Escaping", and "Flower of Blood"; Inglis, however, criticized the album's second half, which he felt "[clumps] together without discernible personality" and was worse than any of the songs on Lenker's solo album Songs (2020).

=== Year-end lists ===
At the end of 2022, Dragon New Warm Mountain... appeared on several professional lists ranking the year's best albums. In addition, "Little Things" was ranked fifteenth on Pitchfork's "The 100 Best Songs of 2021" list. The song had also been awarded the Best New Track distinction in August 2021 by Pitchfork, who commented, "Big Thief perfect their natural ability to turn fleeting moments into unrestrained narrative."

Publication	List	Rank	Ref.
And It Don't Stop	Dean's List: 2022	3	
The Atlantic	The 10 Best Albums of 2022	2	
Billboard	The 50 Best Albums of 2022	33	
Entertainment Weekly	The 10 best albums of 2022	4	
Exclaim!	50 Best Albums of 2022	3	
NME	The 50 best albums of 2022	24	
NPR Music	The 50 Best Albums of 2022	4	
Paste	The 50 Best Albums of 2022	1	
Pitchfork	The 50 Best Albums of 2022	7	
Rolling Stone	The 100 Best Albums of 2022	35	
Uncut	The Top 75 Albums of the Year	5	

=== Accolades ===
Grammy Award nominations for Dragon New Warm Mountain I Believe in You
Grammy Awards
Year	Nominated work	Category	Result	Ref.
2023	"Certainty"	Best Alternative Music Performance	Nominated	
2023	Dragon New Warm Mountain I Believe in You	Best Alternative Music Album	Nominated	

== Track listing ==
All tracks are written by Adrianne Lenker; "Certainty" written with Buck Meek.

No.	Title	Length
1.	"Change"	4:55
2.	"Time Escaping"	3:48
3.	"Spud Infinity"	5:34
4.	"Certainty"	3:07
5.	"Dragon New Warm Mountain I Believe in You"	4:43
6.	"Sparrow"	5:11
7.	"Little Things"	5:44
8.	"Heavy Bend"	1:36
9.	"Flower of Blood"	4:24
10.	"Blurred View"	4:06
11.	"Red Moon"	4:19
12.	"Dried Roses"	2:35
13.	"No Reason"	3:47
14.	"Wake Me Up to Drive"	3:43
15.	"Promise Is a Pendulum"	4:12
16.	"12,000 Lines"	2:59
17.	"Simulation Swarm"	4:12
18.	"Love Love Love"	4:13
19.	"The Only Place"	3:14
20.	"Blue Lightning"	3:51
Total length:		80:13

Japanese edition (bonus tracks)
No.	Title	Length
21.	"Dragon New Warm Mountain I Believe in You" (Tucson)	5:58
22.	"Light Is as Is"	3:02
Total length:		89:30

== Personnel ==
Credits adapted from the album's liner notes.

=== Big Thief ===
- Adrianne Lenker – vocals (all tracks), acoustic guitar (1, 3–7, 11, 12, 14–20), prepared acoustic guitar (2), brush guitar (5), nylon guitar (8), electric guitar (9, 10, 13, 17), snaps (13); engineering, mixing (15); harmonics (17), synthesizer (20), cover artwork, photographs of Meek
- Buck Meek – electric guitar (1, 3, 6, 7, 9–11, 18, 20), vocals (1, 4, 13, 16, 19), prepared acoustic guitar (2), acoustic guitar (4), brush guitar (5, 16), shakers (8); acoustic 12-string guitar, snaps (13); drums (14); bass, magic box guitar (17); most photographs
- James Krivchenia – production (all tracks), drums (1–4, 6–11, 13, 16–18, 20), vocals (1, 6, 13), congas (1), vocal synthesizer (2), mixing (3, 8, 11, 12, 17), bells (5, 9), brushes (5, 20); icicles, computer synthesizer (5); tambourine (7, 9, 13, 20), claps (7), synthesizer (8, 10), electronic drums (8), shakers (9, 17), computer textures (9), snaps (13), drum machine (14)
- Max Oleartchik – bass (1, 3, 4, 6, 7, 9, 11, 13, 14, 16–18, 20), synthesizer (1), arpeggio synthesizer (2); acoustic guitar, icicles (5); tack piano (6), shakers (8), fretless bass (10); vocals, snaps (13)

=== Additional contributors ===
- Hannah Cohen – vocals (4)
- Mat Davidson – vocals (3, 5, 11, 12, 14), fiddle (3, 11, 12), piano (5, 17); pedal steel, recorder (5); accordion (14)
- Amy Dragon – vinyl mastering
- Shawn Everett – engineering, additional production (2, 7, 10, 17); mixing (2, 7, 10)
- Alison Fielding – layout
- Richard Hardy – flute (13)
- Robbie Jeffers – photographs of Meek
- Heba Kadry – mastering
- Noah Lenker – jaw harp (3); vocals, snaps (13), photographs of Meek
- Scott McMicken – engineering, additional production (3, 11, 12, 14); mixing, percussion (14)
- Dom Monks – engineering, additional production (1, 5, 9, 13, 18, 19); mixing (1, 5, 13, 18, 19)
- Brett Neumann – engineering assistance (1, 5, 9, 13, 18, 19)
- Sam Griffin Owens – engineering, additional production (4, 6, 8, 16, 20); mixing (4, 6, 16, 20), tambourine (4)
- Andrew Sarlo – mixing (9, 17)

== Charts ==
Chart performance for Dragon New Warm Mountain I Believe in You
Chart (2022)	Peak position
Australian Albums (ARIA)	19
Austrian Albums (Ö3 Austria)	35
Belgian Albums (Ultratop Flanders)	6
Belgian Albums (Ultratop Wallonia)	60
Canadian Albums (Billboard)	91
Danish Albums (Hitlisten)	22
Dutch Albums (Album Top 100)	6
French Albums (SNEP)	108
German Albums (Offizielle Top 100)	24
Irish Albums (Official Charts)	22
New Zealand Albums (RMNZ)	21
Portuguese Albums (AFP)	15
Scottish Albums (Official Charts)	5
Spanish Albums (Promusicae)	52
Swedish Vinyl Albums (Sverigetopplistan)	10
Swiss Albums (Schweizer Hitparade)	35
UK Albums (Official Charts)	15
UK Independent Albums (Official Charts)	5
US Billboard 200	31
US Independent Albums (Billboard)	3
US Top Alternative Albums (Billboard)	3
US Top Rock Albums (Billboard)	3
