= Twain (musician) =

American musician

Mat Davidson, better known by his stage name Twain, is an American alternative country musician from Marin County. Davidson has released five full-length albums as Twain. Davidson is a former member of the bands the Low Anthem and Spirit Family Reunion.

== History ==
Davidson released his first album under the "Twain" moniker in 2014, titled Life Labors in The Choir. Davidson's second album as Twain, Rare Feeling, was released in 2017 through Keeled Scales. Adventure, the third full-length from Davidson under the Twain moniker, was released in 2019 through Keeled Scales. Davidson released his fourth Twain album, Days of Effort and Ease, in 2020. Davidson's most recent album as Twain, Noon, was released in 2022. The album received mixed reviews.

In addition to making solo music, Twain is also a frequent collaborator with the band Big Thief, being featured on several songs of their 2022 studio album Dragon New Warm Mountain I Believe in You, as well as on solo albums of Big Thief members Adrianne Lenker and Buck Meek.

== Discography ==
Solo studio albums

- 2014: Life Labors in the Choir
- 2017: Rare Feeling
- 2019: Adventure
- 2020: Days of Effort and Ease
- 2022: Noon

As band member or featured artist

- 2011: The Low Anthem - Smart Flesh
- 2012: Spirit Family Reunion - No Separation
- 2018: Buck Meek - Buck Meek
- 2021: Buck Meek - Two Saviors
- 2022: Big Thief - Dragon New Warm Mountain I Believe In You
- 2023: Buck Meek - Haunted Mountain
- 2024: Adrianne Lenker - Bright Future
