= Double Infinity =

Studio album by Big Thief
- Released: September 5, 2025
- Studios: Power Station, New York City, U.S.
- Genres: Indie rock, folk rock
- Length: 42:49
- Label: 4AD
- Producer: Dom Monks

Big Thief chronology
| Dragon New Warm Mountain I Believe in You (2022) | Double Infinity (2025) |

Singles from Double Infinity
- 1. "Incomprehensible" Released: June 3, 2025; 2. "All Night All Day" Released: July 9, 2025; 3. "Los Angeles / Grandmother" Released: August 5, 2025

Double Infinity is the sixth studio album by the American indie rock band Big Thief, released on September 5, 2025, through 4AD. Produced and mixed by longtime collaborator Dom Monks, the album was recorded as a live band over the span of three weeks at the Power Station in New York City, with several session musicians contributing to the recording process.

Recorded as a core three-piece for the first time, it was the band's first album without bassist and founding member Max Oleartchik, following his departure in 2024. Describing the album, lead vocalist and guitarist Adrianne Lenker stated: "Double Infinity is like shouting from the mountain, these deepest things, all the way into the sky, and all the way into the core of the earth."

== Background ==
After extensive touring in support of the band's 2022 double album, Dragon New Warm Mountain I Believe in You, Big Thief announced the departure of founding member and bass guitarist Max Oleartchik on July 11, 2024. The three remaining members – Adrianne Lenker, Buck Meek and James Krivchenia – released a statement, noting:

After many beautiful years together, Max is no longer in Big Thief. Our love for each other is infinite, and we are so grateful for all we have shared these many years together since the beginning of our journey as a band. We wouldn’t be who we are without Max. This separation marks the end of an era, and the beginning of a new one for Big Thief. This change was made for interpersonal reasons with mutual respect in our hearts.

Following Oleartchik's departure, the band toured in the summer of 2024 with two new additional live members – Justin Felton (bass) and Jon Nellen (additional drums) – performing eleven dates in total between July and August. In October, the band released a collaborative studio album, Dance of Love, with singer-songwriter Tucker Zimmerman, which had been recorded prior to Oleartchik's exit.

== Recording ==
In preparation for recording Double Infinity, the band wrote “something like 50 or 60 songs" as a three-piece, with initial plans for the album's style and sound going through "conceptual rigmarole." Buck Meek noted: "We all kind of agreed we wanted to make a heavy rock album. That was the first concept." Abandoning this idea, the band attempted to record a stripped-back album instead: "We tried to record the album with just the three of us in isolation in the woods. But we realised that we really wanted to open up the doors and bring in a big community of people that we admire."

The band recorded Double Infinity at the Power Station in New York City over a three-week period, recording sixteen songs in total with their longtime recording engineer Dom Monks serving as producer. The band worked with ten session musicians, looking for a set of collaborators, rather than a replacement for Oleartchik. Krivchenia and Lenker both likened the process to tentatively dating after a "divorce" or break-up.

Meek elaborated:

We felt stuck in the echo chamber of our thoughts. So we went to the opposite extreme — back to Manhattan where we started — to surround ourselves with community, old friends from Brooklyn, and new friends and heroes. We needed to be in community and in the midst of the city to have that stimulus.

The band wanted the ten session musicians to bring "constant liquid sonic elements" to the recording process, with the assembled collective including additional drummer and percussionist Jon Nellen, who had performed with the band on their 2024 tour; and three backing vocalists – Alena Spanger, Hannah Cohen and June McDoom – who brought a "witchy" energy to the sessions and recorded their vocals "under many layers of cosy blankets in their own separate room". Lenker felt that her lead vocals were "cushioned by these angels" during the recording process:

I’m like, super fluid, but we had our ladies’ vibe! Hannah was calling us ‘the goyles’ and it kind of brought that out of me! I feel masculine a lot, and I feel very fluid. I change, and I’m always different. [...] It was powerful, and it felt good.

Other close studio contributors included Natural Information Society's Mikel Patrick Avery, and Laraaji, who provided "organic droning on zither" and "an iPad with wild flute and violin patches." Described by the band as "the great New York musician", Mikey Buishas would sample the musicians as they recorded, creating a "loop with ten feet of tape around a mic stand.

Lenker praised the addition of other musicians in the studio: "Big Thief is something that is flexible and fluid, and can expand and contract. In those moments of playing with everybody, we were all Big Thief." Upon completing Double Infinity, the band adopted bass guitarist Joshua Crumbly into their live line-up.

== Writing and composition ==
Adrianne Lenker said that she had continued writing songs extensively in the years following Dragon New Warm Mountain I Believe in You. The band also spent several weeks writing together, which Lenker described as a new aspect of the band's writing process. Several songs, including "Grandmother", "Happy with You", "How Could I Have Known", and "Los Angeles", were co-written by Lenker, Buck Meek, and James Krivchenia, marking the first time songs on a Big Thief album were credited to all three members.

The title and concept for Double Infinity existed before Oleartchik's departure and before the title track itself was written. Buck Meek said the phrase originated from a recurring "two eights" motif, which became the name of the band's studio and later the working title for the album. Lenker described the title as being about "the inner and the outer infinities, and the body as a bridge." She explained that there are different dimensions to how "double infinities" can be perceived, including "the macro and the micro. Out into the cosmos and then down on a cellular level." She also connected the concept to "future and past levels, everything before you came into this body and everything after you leave this body." She said it "speaks to the strangeness of being human."

Lenker said that an element of trance or drone connected many of the album's songs. Some of the drone elements were contributed by ambient and new age pioneer Laraaji.

The track "Happy with You" has lyrics structured in the form of a haiku.

== Critical reception ==
Professional ratings
Aggregate scores
| Source | Rating |
|---|---|
| AnyDecentMusic? | 8.2/10 |
| Metacritic | 84/100 |
Review scores
| Source | Rating |
| AllMusic | 3.5/5 stars |
| The Line of Best Fit | 7/10 |
| Mojo | 4/5 stars |
| NME | 4/5 stars |
| Pitchfork | 7.6/10 |
| Record Collector | 5/5 stars |
| Rolling Stone | 4/5 stars |
| The Skinny | 4/5 stars |
| Slant Magazine | 3.5/5 stars |
| Uncut | 9/10 |

According to the review aggregator Metacritic, Double Infinity received "universal acclaim" based on a weighted average score of 84 out of 100 from 22 critic scores. Robert Christgau hailed it as a triumph of "shameless beauty" despite the loss of the band's typical "delicacy", highlighting the song "All Night All Day" in particular and drummer Krivchenia as the "hero" for his negotiation of "clatter [and] momentum". The Economist included Double Infinity in their list of the top 10 albums of 2025, saying the record "has great spikiness and variety, thanks to Adrianne Lenker’s songwriting."

=== Year-end lists ===
At the end of 2025, Double Infinity appeared on several professional lists ranking the year's best albums. In addition, "Double Infinity" was included on Pitchfork's "The 100 Best Songs of 2025" list.

| Publication | List | Rank | Ref. |
|---|---|---|---|
| BrooklynVegan | BrooklynVegan's Top 55 Albums of 2025 | 29 | |
| Clash | Albums Of The Year 2025 | 23 | |
| The Guardian | The 50 Best Albums of 2025 | 18 | |
| The Independent | The 20 Best albums of 2025 | 12 | |
| Mojo | Mojo's 75 Best Albums of 2025 | 4 | |
| NME | The 50 Best albums of 2025 | 26 | |
| The Skinny | The Skinny's Albums of 2025 | 10 | |
| The Sunday Times | 25 Best Albums of 2025 | 9 | |
| Uncut | 80 Best Albums of 2025 | 17 | |

== Track listing ==
All tracks are written by Adrianne Lenker, except where noted.

Double Infinity track listing
| No. | Title | Writer(s) | Length |
|---|---|---|---|
| 1. | "Incomprehensible" | | 3:53 |
| 2. | "Words" | | 3:47 |
| 3. | "Los Angeles" | Lenker; James Krivchenia; Buck Meek | 3:57 |
| 4. | "All Night All Day" | | 4:48 |
| 5. | "Double Infinity" | | 4:12 |
| 6. | "No Fear" | | 6:58 |
| 7. | "Grandmother" (with Laraaji) | Lenker; Krivchenia; Meek | 6:00 |
| 8. | "Happy with You" | Lenker; Krivchenia; Meek | 4:26 |
| 9. | "How Could I Have Known" | Lenker; Krivchenia; Meek | 4:48 |
| Total length: | | | 42:49 |

== Personnel ==
Credits adapted from liner notes.

Big Thief

- Adrianne Lenker – vocals, guitar (all tracks), drone (4), percussion, ambience (8)
- Buck Meek – guitar (all tracks), vocals (1, 3, 7–9)
- James Krivchenia – drums (all tracks), percussion (1, 2, 4–9), synth (1), vocals (1, 7, 8), drone (4, 9), ambience (8)

Additional musicians

- Alena Spanger – vocals
- Hannah Cohen – vocals
- Joshua Crumbly – bass guitar
- June McDoom – vocals
- Laraaji – zither (1, 3, 4, 6–8), tablet (1, 3, 4, 7, 8), electro-mechanical piano (2), vocals (2, 7), percussion (6)
- Mikel Patrick Avery – percussion (1, 2, 5–7)
- Mikey Buishas – piano (1, 3–5, 8), tape loop (2–7), synth (7)
- Caleb Michel – percussion (2, 4, 7–9)
- Jon Nellen – percussion (3, 4, 6, 8, 9)
- Adam Brisbin – guitar (9)

Technical personnel

- Dom Monks – production, mixing, engineering
- Milo Ferreria-Hayes – tape engineering
- Matthew Sullivan – studio engineering
- Beth Scott – assistant engineer
- John Miller – assistant engineer
- James Krivchenia – additional engineering
- Mirza Sheriff – mixing assistant
- Matt Colton – mastering
- Adrianne Lenker, Millie Minshall, Molly Styslinger, Sarah Schiesser – artwork concept
- Bobby Doherty – album cover photo

== Charts ==
Chart performance for Double Infinity
| Chart (2025) | Peak position |
|---|---|
| Australian Albums (ARIA) | 19 |
| Austrian Albums (Ö3 Austria) | 40 |
| Belgian Albums (Ultratop Flanders) | 15 |
| Belgian Albums (Ultratop Wallonia) | 72 |
| Dutch Albums (Album Top 100) | 18 |
| German Rock & Metal Albums (Offizielle Top 100) | 17 |
| Irish Albums (Official Charts) | 27 |
| Irish Independent Albums (IRMA) | 3 |
| Japanese Western Albums (Oricon) | 25 |
| Japanese Top Albums Sales (Billboard Japan) | 81 |
| New Zealand Albums (RMNZ) | 24 |
| Portuguese Albums (AFP) | 139 |
| Scottish Albums (Official Charts) | 5 |
| Swedish Physical Albums (Sverigetopplistan) | 6 |
| UK Albums (Official Charts) | 21 |
| UK Americana Albums (Official Charts) | 1 |
| UK Independent Albums (Official Charts) | 6 |
| US Billboard 200 | 121 |
| US Independent Albums (Billboard) | 21 |
