= Two Saviors =

Studio album by Buck Meek
- Released: January 15, 2021
- Recorded: July 2019
- Genre: Indie-rock; alt-country; Folk
- Length: 36:54
- Label: Keeled Scales
- Producer: Andrew Sarlo

Buck Meek chronology
Buck Meek (2018)	Two Saviors (2021)	Haunted Mountain (2023)

Professional ratings
Aggregate scores
Source	Rating
AnyDecentMusic?	6.9/10
Metacritic	77/100
Review scores
Source	Rating
AllMusic	4/5 stars
Beats Per Minute	79%
DIY	3.5/5 stars
Loud and Quiet	7/10
Pitchfork	7.1/10

Two Saviors is the second studio album by American musician and Big Thief guitarist Buck Meek. It was released on January 15, 2021, through Keeled Scales Records.

== Background and recording ==
The album was recorded in July 2019, and was initially going to be released in July 2020, but got pushed back to January 2021 due to the COVID-19 pandemic.

== Release and promotion ==
The album's opening track "Pareidolia" was released as a single on November 17, 2020.

The second single "Candle" was released on January 7, 2021.

== Critical reception ==
Two Saviors was met with "generally favorable" reviews from critics. At Metacritic, which assigns a weighted average rating out of 100 to reviews from mainstream publications, this release received an average score of 77 based on 9 reviews. At AnyDecentMusic?, the release was given a 6.9 out of 10 based on 9 reviews.

In a review for AllMusic, Marcy Donelson said: "Throughout Two Saviors, Meek's uniquely kindly tenor conveys evocative phrases and settings that likewise stand apart from the crowd. Much of the album consists of similarly affectionate, soft-footed tracks." Carlo Thomas of Beats Per Minute wrote: "Two Saviors is quiet and understated, yet thoroughly enjoyable despite rarely moving out of second gear. The lyrical approach is the key insight to Two Saviors: Meek uses characters, their stories, and his interactions with them, to process his thoughts on the human condition." Writing for DIY, Louisa Dixon explained: "A feather-light collection of alt-country, packed with pedal steel, lilting melodies and Buck's own evocative Texan burr, Buck's latest outing is a soothing antidote to literally everything else 2020 has thrown our way."

At Loud and Quiet, Ollie Rankine stated: "Shacked up with his bandmates in an old Louisiana manor house, Meek's songs are, like his stately surrounds, far beyond their years. His gentle wonderings about life, adventure and resilience in heartbreak are carried by the sort of wisdom often found with a much older head."

== Track listing ==
All tracks are written by Buck Meek; "Candle" co-written with Adrianne Lenker.

Two Saviors track listing
No.	Title	Length
1.	"Pareidolia"	4:07
2.	"Candle"	3:43
3.	"Second Sight"	3:57
4.	"Two Saviors"	3:06
5.	"Two Moons"	3:02
6.	"Dream Daughter"	3:53
7.	"Ham on White"	2:07
8.	"Cannonball, Pt. 2"	4:04
9.	"Two Moons (Morning)"	2:38
10.	"Pocketknife"	2:23
11.	"Halo Light"	3:54
Total length:		36:54

== Personnel ==
Credits are adapted from the album's liner notes.

- Buck Meek – guitar, vocals, photos of Adam Brisbin, Mat Davidson, and Andrew Sarlo
- Adam Brisbin − guitar, vocals
- Mat Davidson – bass, pedal steel, fiddle, slide guitar, vocals
- Dylan Meek – piano, Rhodes, pump organ, vocals
- Austin Vaughn - drums, percussion
- Andrew Sarlo – production, mixing, engineering
- Heba Kadry – mastering
- Adrianne Lenker – cover photograph
- Robbie Jeffers – photos of Austin Vaughn and Dylan Meek
- Miles Johnson – album design
