= Not (song) =

2019 single by Big Thief

Single by Big Thief

from the album Two Hands
- Released: August 13, 2019
- Length: 6:07
- Label: 4AD
- Songwriter: Adrianne Lenker
- Producer: Andrew Sarlo

Big Thief singles chronology
"Century" (2019)	"Not" (2019)	"Forgotten Eyes" (2019)

"Not" is a song by American indie rock band Big Thief, released as the first single from their fourth studio album Two Hands. It was released on August 13, 2019, by 4AD as a digital single alongside the album's announcement.

The song was nominated for Best Rock Song and Best Rock Performance at the 63rd Annual Grammy Awards.

== Background ==
"We found something between the four of us [...] It was like we were riding in the wind. I don't even remember at a certain point. We went somewhere."

— Adrianne Lenker

Big Thief debuted the song during a concert at Point Éphémère in Paris, France on March 28, 2018. Getting the recording of the song exactly right was important to the band, and they later re-recorded it at Sound City Studios in Van Nuys, California.

== Composition ==
Written by Adrianne Lenker, the song's lyrics uses negation to describe something, with Lenker repeating the use of "not" or "nor" at the beginning of each line. Bob Boilen of NPR described the song's subject as "the inability to describe what that something is, only to be able to explain what it is not."

The second half of the song is instrumental and features a guitar solo played by Lenker.

== Performances ==
"Not" was performed live by Big Thief on The Late Show with Stephen Colbert on October 10, 2019. Claire Shaffer of Rolling Stone described the performance as a "hard-rock spin" on the song with "distorted" guitars and "manic" drums, comparing Adrianne Lenker's "wailing" vocals to that of emo music. Ben Kaye of Consequence of Sound called it "an impassioned performance that demonstrated why they're one of the most engaging groups to emerge from the folk scene in some time."

The band performed "Not" as well as "Two Hands" and "Forgotten Eyes" on CBS This Morning on October 26, 2019, as part of the program's Saturday Sessions segment.

== Critical reception ==
The song was praised by Pitchfork, who named it Best New Track upon release and called it "a towering statement from a group constantly leapfrogging over themselves." BBC Music compared Lenker's guitar solo to that of "Neil Young at his peak." At the end of 2019, Barack Obama listed the song among his favorites of the year.

=== Accolades ===
"Not" was nominated for Best Rock Song and Best Rock Performance at the 63rd Annual Grammy Awards.

=== Year-end lists ===
"Not" appeared in several publications' year-end lists. NPR Music named it the best song of 2019 with Bob Boilen writing, "No song in 2019 felt more searing, more perfect, than 'Not'".

Publication	List	Rank	Ref.
BBC Music	The 20 best songs of 2019	19	
Billboard	The 100 Best Songs of 2019	56	
Consequence of Sound	Top 50 Songs of 2019	24	
Flood Magazine	The Best Songs of 2019	3	
The Guardian	The 20 best songs of 2019	12	
NPR Music	25 Best Songs of 2019	1	
Paste	The 50 Best Songs of 2019	7	
Pitchfork	The 100 Best Songs of 2019	9	
Uproxx	The Best Songs of 2019	10	
Vice	The 100 Best Songs of 2019	20	

== Cover versions ==
In November 2019, "Not" was covered by Matt Berninger, vocalist and frontman of The National, during a solo live performance at the sixth annual Dream Serenade benefit concert in Toronto.

In April 2020, a cover was released by former Red Hot Chili Peppers guitarist Josh Klinghoffer under the pseudonym of Pluralone.

On September 4, 2020, Hamilton Leithauser released the live album Live! at Café Carlyle, collecting 10 recordings made during his residency at the New York City Café Carlyle. It includes a cover of "Not".

== Personnel ==
Credits adapted from the liner notes of Two Hands.

- Adrianne Lenker – songwriting, vocals, guitar
- Buck Meek – guitar
- Max Oleartchik – bass
- James Krivchenia – drums, vocals, mallets
- Andrew Sarlo – production, mixing, engineering

== Charts ==
Chart (2019)	Peak position
Belgium (Ultratip Bubbling Under Flanders)	30
