= Blue raspberry =

Blue Raspberry may refer to:

- Rubus leucodermis (the "blue raspberry" or "whitebark raspberry"), a species of Rubus native to western North America
- Blue Raspberry (album) by Katy Kirby, 2024
- Blue raspberry flavor, a food and beverage flavoring, often artificially colored blue
- Blue Raspberry (singer) (Candi Lindsey) (born 1972), American singer
