= Consumation =

Consumation may refer to:

- Consummation (disambiguation) (for which the single-m version is an easy misspelling)
- The Consumation, Hurt's 2003 album
- "Consumation", a song by Nina Simone, from the album Silk & Soul

== See also ==
- Consumption (disambiguation)
- The Re-Consumation, Hurt's 2008 album of pre-2000 performances
