= Masterpiece (Big Thief album) =

Studio album by Big Thief
- Released: May 27, 2016
- Recorded: July 1–July 12, 2015
- Genres: Indie rock; folk rock; Americana; lo-fi; country
- Length: 37:16
- Label: Saddle Creek
- Producer: Andrew Sarlo

Big Thief chronology
Masterpiece (2016)	Capacity (2017)

Singles from Masterpiece
- 1. "Masterpiece" Released: February 19, 2016; 2. "Real Love" Released: March 17, 2016; 3. "Paul" Released: May 14, 2016

Masterpiece is the debut studio album by the American band Big Thief, released through Saddle Creek Records on May 27, 2016.

== Background and recording ==
Masterpiece was recorded from July 1–July 12, 2015, on Lake Champlain in Essex, New York.

== Music and lyrics ==
Mojo states that the Masterpiece "effortlessly genre-hops between dusty Americana, Breeders-style angular art-pop and off-kilter folk." The album's loud guitars and emotiveness have drawn comparisons to indie rock band Hop Along. Jill Mapes of Pitchfork said Big Thief "shifts nimbly between lo-fi acoustic and throwback rock hooks, keeping everything noisy and tuneful". Additionally, the album utilizes elements of honky-tonk, grunge and ambient noise music. Some of the album's tracks have drawn comparisons to 1990s "grunge pop" artists such as Julianna Hatfield and Liz Phair. The album's lyrics explore topics such as lovesickness, abuse and mental illness. Jill Mapes of Pitchfork opined, "the songs sound cherry-picked over a lifetime of writing, the stories carefully compiled." AllMusic said the album is "rhythmically a balanced mix of energetic grooves and melancholy explorations."

== Artwork ==
The album's cover features a photograph of Lenker's mother as a child, playing with a toy dinosaur.

== Critical reception ==
Professional ratings
Aggregate scores
Source	Rating
AnyDecentMusic?	7.7/10
Metacritic	79/100
Review scores
Source	Rating
AllMusic	4/5 stars
DIY	4/5 stars
Exclaim!	8/10
The Irish Times	4/5 stars
Mojo	4/5 stars
Pitchfork	7.7/10
PopMatters	8/10
Rolling Stone	3.5/5 stars
Spin	7/10
Uncut	7/10

Masterpiece received positive reviews upon its release. At Metacritic, which assigns a normalized rating out of 100 to reviews from music critics, the album has received an average score of 79, indicating "generally favorable reviews", based on 14 reviews.

Jamie Milton of DIY said "With Adrianne Lenker at the helm, Big Thief can count themselves as emotionally destructive as Sharon Van Etten." Marcy Donelson of AllMusic gave the album four stars out of five, calling it "wall-to-wall artful expression that finds a songwriter thriving as part of a four-piece." Jim Carrol of The Irish Times also gave the album four stars out of five, and wrote. "You may not think you need yet another indie-folk band from Brooklyn in your life – and then you clock what Adrianne Lenker and friends are doing and you're all ears. [...] Rich, textured, emotional, seductive, detailed and deep, Masterpiece is one of those seasoned albums that sounds as if it's been around forever. [...] A sweetheart of a record, one to keep close and treasure."

Juan Edgardo Rodríguez of PopMatters gave the album a score of 8 out of 10, writing: "Big Thief is a band that understands that there's much to explore within life's empty spaces, to never underestimate what's not readily there and occupy it with grand, though modest, gestures.[...] The drifting compositions in Masterpiece are in constant movement, as if there's this need to go, even if they're not too concerned about where it leads to." Matt Williams of Exclaim! also gave the album a score of 8 of 10 and wrote: "Masterpiece may be flawed, but try to think of a magnum opus, or a life, that isn't. The most exciting part is that it's likely Big Thief's best is yet to come." Mojo gave the album the same score, calling it "the work of some feverishly creative minds."

Dan Weiss of Spin gave the album a score of 7 out of 10, saying: "Lenker isn't the room-swallowing presence that [Frances] Quinlan is, but she more than makes up for it in commanding songcraft, which skews dynamic, dissonant, and placid without ever changing its sepia tone. Sure, that means a drumless drone like 'Randy' will captivate the inert likes of Sharon Van Etten, one of their biggest believers, especially as their debut album Masterpiece draws to its desolate close. But for six or seven winners closer to the front it makes the most of its saloon-grunge palette." Uncut gave the album the same score, and said: "Big Thief are at their best when the instruments step back and create a mellower platform from which Lenker can dominate."

Jill Mapes of Pitchfork gave the album a score of 7.7 of 10, writing: "On the rangy folk-rock band Big Thief's Saddle Creek debut Masterpiece, the songs sound cherry-picked over a lifetime of writing, the stories carefully compiled. [...] What doesn't work as much are the attempts to make Masterpiece feel overly homemade. [...] Listening to Lenker's early work, where she is definitely more of a folk singer, I'm reminded of a line from Masterpiece's title track: 'There's only so much letting go you can ask someone to do.'"

== Track listing ==
All tracks are written by Adrianne Lenker.

No.	Title	Length
1.	"Little Arrow"	1:58
2.	"Masterpiece"	3:51
3.	"Vegas"	2:19
4.	"Real Love"	4:17
5.	"Interstate"	3:24
6.	"Lorraine"	1:53
7.	"Paul"	3:04
8.	"Humans"	3:23
9.	"Velvet Ring"	2:36
10.	"Animals"	2:59
11.	"Randy"	3:09
12.	"Parallels"	4:23
Total length:		37:16

== Personnel ==
Credits adapted from the album's liner notes.

- Adrianne Lenker – guitar, vocals
- Buck Meek – lead guitar, vocals
- Max Oleartchik – bass
- Jason Burger – drums
- Andrew Sarlo – production, mixing, inner panel photos
- James Krivchenia – engineering, additional production
- Sarah Register – mastering
- Jadon Ulrich – album design
- Matteo Spaccarelli – "I like a truck"
