= Tucker Zimmerman =

American singer (1941–2026)

- Born: Bryan Tucker Zimmerman; February 14, 1941; San Francisco, California, U.S.
- Died: January 17, 2026 (aged 84) Saint-Georges-sur-Meuse, Belgium
- Occupations: Singer; songwriter
- Spouse: Marie-Claire Lambert (m. 1970)
- Website: tuckerzimmerman.com

Bryan Tucker Zimmerman (February 14, 1941 – January 17, 2026) was an American singer-songwriter.

== Early life and education ==
Zimmerman was born on February 14, 1941, in San Francisco, California. At age four, Zimmerman began violin lessons on a violin made by his grandfather. When he was seven, his family moved to Healdsburg, a rural town in the Wine Country region of Sonoma County, California.

In 1966 he graduated from the San Francisco State College with a degree in music theory and composition and took up a Fulbright scholarship to study composition in Rome, where he met his future wife. After two years in London, where he recorded his first album, he began living in Belgium.

== Career ==
In December 1968, Zimmerman recorded and released his first album, Ten Songs, produced by Tony Visconti. It was later described by David Bowie as one of his favourite albums. One track from the album, "Fourth Hour of My Sleep" was later recorded by Ronno, a band fronted by Mick Ronson.

In 1967, he collaborated with the Paul Butterfield Blues Band on the song "Droppin' Out". The song appeared on the Butterfield Blues Band album The Resurrection of Pigboy Crabshaw.

In 1985, Zimmerman turned to writing novels, short stories, poems, and composing film music and compositions for symphonic orchestras.

In 1996 he formed his Nightshift trio, accompanied by bassist Jeff Van Gool, and his son, Quanah Zimmerman, a self-taught guitarist. The Nightshift trio recorded Walking On the Edge Of The Blues.

In 2005, he released the album Chautauqua.

In September 2024, Zimmerman announced a new album, Dance of Love, due to be released in October 2024 via 4AD. Dance of Love was produced by Big Thief, who also served as the backing band, along with collaborators Iji and Twain.

== Later life and death ==
Tucker married Marie-Claire Lambert in 1970. They lived in Stockay-Saint-Georges in Belgium, in the province of Liège, where he owned a studio.

The couple died in a house fire on January 17, 2026; he was 84, she was 82.

== Family ==
He was the nephew of Charlie Zimmerman.

== Discography ==
=== Albums ===
- Ten Songs by Tucker Zimmerman, 1969
- Song Poet, 1971
- Over Here in Europe, 1974
- Foot Tap, 1977
- Square Dance, 1980
- Word Games, 1983
- Walking on the Edge of the Blues (Nightshift Trio), 2003
- Chautauqua, 2005
- A la Maison de la Poésie (Tucker Zimmerman's Nightshift Trio) 2CD, 2005
- A Feather Flies Out, 2CD, 2021
- Tucker Zimmerman Trio 3CD box containing 'Dust in the Rising Wind + Angels in Disguise + Showdown at the Dairy Queen', 2024
- Dust in the Rising Wind (Tucker Zimmerman Trio), 2024
- Angels In Disguise (Tucker Zimmerman Trio), 2024
- Showdown at the Dairy Queen (Tucker Zimmerman Trio), 2024
- Dance of Love, 2024
- Music by River Words by Ear, 2025

=== Videography ===
- All Fall Down, Canadian movie (2009)
- Destroying Angel, film made in 16mm (1998)
- The Recovery, black and white film (1995)
- Passing Through, Torn Formations (1988)
- Eastmans Reisen, German short film (1981)
- Souvenir of Gibraltar, film by Henri Xhonneux (1975)
