= Cool Dry Place =

2021 studio album by Katy Kirby

Studio album by Katy Kirby
- Released: February 19, 2021
- Genre: Indie folk
- Length: 28:22
- Label: Keeled Scales

Katy Kirby chronology
Juniper (2018)	Cool Dry Place (2021)	Blue Raspberry (2024)

Professional ratings
Aggregate scores
Source	Rating
AnyDecentMusic?	7.8/10
Metacritic	84/100
Review scores
Source	Rating
AllMusic	4/5 stars
The Line of Best Fit	9.0/10 stars
Consequence of Sound	8.3/10 stars
Under the Radar	8.0/10
Paste	7.6/10
Beats Per Minute	7.7/10

Cool Dry Place is the debut studio album by American indie folk musician Katy Kirby. The album was released on February 19, 2021, through Keeled Scales.

== Track listing ==
All tracks are written by Katy Kirby.

Cool Dry Place track listing
No.	Title	Length
1.	"Eyelids"	1:40
2.	"Juniper"	2:39
3.	"Peppermint"	2:20
4.	"Traffic!"	3:37
5.	"Tap Twice"	2:37
6.	"Secret Language"	3:42
7.	"Portals"	3:03
8.	"Cool Dry Place"	5:00
9.	"Listening"	3:25
10.	"Fireman"	3:39
Total length:		28:17
