= Two Hands (Big Thief album) =

Studio album by Big Thief
- Released: October 11, 2019
- Recorded: February 2018; July 2018; April 2019
- Studios: Sonic Ranch, Tornillo, Texas; Demo Cabin, Topanga, California; Sound City, Los Angeles, California
- Length: 39:36
- Label: 4AD
- Producer: Andrew Sarlo

Big Thief chronology
U.F.O.F. (2019)	Two Hands (2019)	Dragon New Warm Mountain I Believe in You (2022)

Singles from Two Hands
- 1. "Not" Released: August 13, 2019; 2. "Forgotten Eyes" Released: October 2, 2019

Two Hands is the fourth studio album by the American band Big Thief, released through 4AD on October 11, 2019. The album comes five months after the release of the band's third studio album, U.F.O.F., and is described as its "earth twin". It was preceded by the singles "Not" and "Forgotten Eyes".

== Background and recording ==
Recording for Two Hands began only days after the band completed recording their third studio album, U.F.O.F., at Bear Creek Studio in Woodinville, Washington. Two Hands was recorded primarily at Sonic Ranch in Tornillo, Texas in July 2018. It was produced by Andrew Sarlo, who had since produced every album by Big Thief. Compared to the lush nature setting of Bear Creek, Sonic Ranch is located in the dry, hot Chihuahuan Desert of Texas. The album's press release indicated the studio was chosen purposely for its "vast desert location", with the songs reflecting its influence. The songs were recorded live with almost no overdubs and all but two songs feature entirely live vocal takes. The album was mixed by Sarlo and drummer James Krivchenia at Bunker Studios in Brooklyn, New York in October 2018; and at Sarlo's Cabin and Sound City in Los Angeles in April 2019.

The band decided to scrap the Sonic Ranch recording of "Not" because they "felt it needed openness." "Not" was re-recorded at Sound City Studios in April 2019. It was captured live on the first take.

"Replaced", co-written by Adrianne Lenker and Buck Meek, appears on the album in its original demo recording from the sessions the band recorded in a cabin in Topanga Canyon in February 2018.

== Music and lyrics ==
Two Hands sees Big Thief take on "powerful and gritty" grunge-folk. It also works in indie rock, yielding a "crisper [and] more jagged" sound than that of U.F.O.F. Slant saw the music as shoegazing that had 1960s / '70s folk and rock filtered through it. In the album's press release, Adrianne Lenker said, "Two Hands has the songs that I'm the most proud of; I can imagine myself singing them when I'm old. Musically and lyrically, you can't break it down much further than this. It's already bare-bones."

== Release and promotion ==
In early August, some fans who had purchased U.F.O.F. on vinyl from the 4AD website received an unmarked 7" record in the mail. It contained two songs that were later revealed to be the title track "Two Hands" and "Love In Mine", a track appearing on the Japanese version of the album. The 7" had "10/11/19" etched into it, alluding to the release date.

The album was announced on August 13, 2019, alongside the release of its first single, "Not". Upon release, the song was awarded the "Best New Track" distinction by Pitchfork, with Quinn Moreland calling it "a towering statement from a group constantly leapfrogging over themselves."

On the August 19, 2019, the band performed Two Hands in full during an intimate show at London's Bush Hall.

A second song from the album, "Forgotten Eyes", was released on October 2, 2019.

== Critical reception ==
Professional ratings
Aggregate scores
Source	Rating
AnyDecentMusic?	8.3/10
Metacritic	85/100
Review scores
Source	Rating
AllMusic	4/5 stars
Consequence of Sound	A−
The Guardian	4/5 stars
The Independent	5/5 stars
Mojo	4/5 stars
The Observer	4/5 stars
Pitchfork	9.0/10
Q	3/5 stars
Rolling Stone	3.5/5 stars
Uncut	8/10

At Metacritic, which assigns a normalized rating out of 100 to reviews from professional publications, the album received an average score of 85, based on 22 reviews.

Roisin O'Connor of The Independent gave the album a perfect 5-star rating, deeming it the band's "best to date, and undoubtedly one of the best of the year." Marcy Donelson of AllMusic wrote, "While it's hard to talk about Two Hands in 2019 without the context of the stunning U.F.O.F., the album's quality stands on its own, offering its own grade of intimacy, sound, and feel for alternate moods." David Sackllah of Consequence of Sound wrote, "Capping one of the strongest years a rock band has had in a while, this stands as a crowning achievement, the perfect record to close out a tumultuous decade and lead into one where the damage may be irreversible."

=== Accolades ===
"Not" was nominated for Best Rock Song and Best Rock Performance at the 63rd Annual Grammy Awards.

In December 2019, Spin named Two Hands as the best album of 2019 in its annual critic's picks.

== Track listing ==
All tracks are written by Adrianne Lenker, except where noted.

No.	Title	Length
1.	"Rock and Sing"	2:03
2.	"Forgotten Eyes"	3:31
3.	"The Toy"	4:16
4.	"Two Hands"	3:52
5.	"Those Girls"	3:22
6.	"Shoulders"	3:13
7.	"Not"	6:07
8.	"Wolf"	4:42
9.	"Replaced" (Lenker, Buck Meek)	4:54
10.	"Cut My Hair"	3:36
Total length:		39:36

== Personnel ==
Credits adapted from the album's liner notes.

Big Thief

- Adrianne Lenker – guitar (all tracks), vocals (all tracks)
- Buck Meek – guitar (all tracks), vocals (3–5, 9)
- Max Oleartchik – bass (all tracks), vocals (1), percussion (3)
- James Krivchenia – drums (1–7, 9, 10), vocals (1, 7), percussion (4), mallets (7), cymbal (8)

Technical personnel

- Andrew Sarlo – production (all tracks), mixing (3, 4, 6–9), engineering (7)
- Dom Monks – engineering (1–6, 8, 10)
- James Krivchenia – mixing (1–6, 8–10), engineering (9)
- Greg Calbi – mastering
- Todd Carder – tape liaison
- Keith J Nelson – tape liaison
- Sam Griffin Owens – tape liaison
- Mario Ramirez – assistance (Sonic Ranch)
- Joseph Lorge – assistance (Sound City)

Artwork

- Dustin Condren – cover photography
- Sarah Schiesser – design, layout

== Charts ==
Chart (2019)	Peak position
Australian Albums (ARIA)	99
Belgian Albums (Ultratop Flanders)	20
Belgian Albums (Ultratop Wallonia)	119
Dutch Albums (Album Top 100)	59
Irish Albums (IRMA)	78
Scottish Albums (Official Charts)	8
UK Albums (Official Charts)	34
US Billboard 200	113
