= Spirit Family Reunion =

American country band

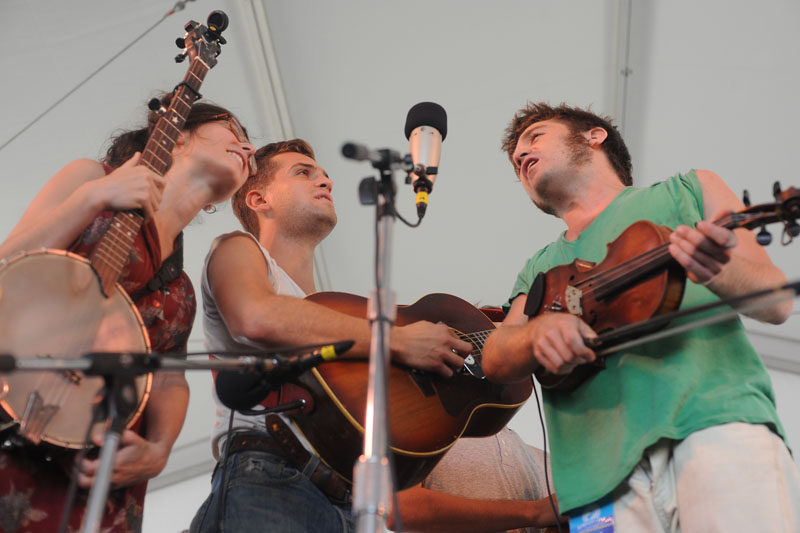

Background information
- Origin: Brooklyn, New York
- Genres: Folk, bluegrass, country
- Instruments: Vocals, acoustic guitar, banjo, bass drum, washboard, tambourine, fiddle, accordion, bass, drums
- Years active: 2010–present
- Members: Nick Panken; Maggie Carson; Stephen Weinheimer; Ken Woodward; Or Zubalsky
- Past members: Noah Block-Harley; Dylan Block-Harley; Mat Davidson; Peter Pezzimenti
- Website: www.spiritfamilyreunion.com

Spirit Family Reunion is a band from Brooklyn, New York influenced by traditional American music such as country, folk and gospel. Founded in 2009 by core members Nick Panken (vocals, acoustic guitar), Maggie Carson (five string banjo, vocal), and Stephen Weinheimer (washboard, bass drum, tambourine, vocals), and featuring a rotating cast of musicians such as Ken Woodward (bass, vocals), Or Zubalsky (drums), Noah Block-Harley (fiddle, vocals), Dylan Block-Harley (drums, vocals), Mat Davidson (fiddle, accordion, mandolin, vocals), and Pete Pezzimenti (drums, vocals). They have referred to their style as "homegrown American music" and "open-door gospel", and are often compared to bluegrass, country and appalachian music.

== History ==
The band started out as Panken and Weinheimer playing with different people each night at the bar where they worked, and eventually became Spirit Family Reunion. Officially formed in 2010, Spirit Family Reunion has self-produced and self-released two full-length albums, No Separation (2013) and Hands Together (2015). They have toured with bands such as Trampled by Turtles, Levon Helm, Tedeschi Trucks Band, Dr. Dog, The Felice Brothers, and Alabama Shakes and performed at the Newport Folk Festival, Hardly Strictly Bluegrass, Celebrate Brooklyn!, FloydFest, Bristol Rhythm & Roots Reunion, Flood City Music Festival, The Buckle Up Music Festival, Shakori Hills Grassroots Festival, and the Americana Music Festival & Conference among others. They played a Tiny Desk Concert in 2012 and took part in the Bob Dylan in the 80s project. They were also featured in issue No. 34 of The Deli Magazine in 2013.

== Discography ==
=== Albums ===
- No Separation (2012)
- Hands Together (2015)
- Harvest Festival Live (2016)
- Ride Free (2019)

=== Extended plays ===
- Spirit Family Reunion (2010)

=== Singles ===
==== "When My Name Is Spoken 7" ====
- "When My Name Is Spoken" (2010)
- "On That Day" (2010)

==== "I Want To Be Relieved 7" ====
- "I Want To Be Relieved" (2012)
- "Green Rocky Road" (2012)
- "Goin' Out To Cannon Ball" (2016)
