= Haunted Mountain =

Studio album by Buck Meek
- Released: August 25, 2023
- Recorded: August 2022
- Studio: Sonic Ranch
- Genre: Alt-country
- Length: 42:00
- Label: 4AD
- Producer: Mat Davidson

Buck Meek chronology
Two Saviors (2021)	Haunted Mountain (2023)

Haunted Mountain is the third studio album by the American musician Buck Meek, released on August 25, 2023, through 4AD. It was produced by Mat Davidson and recorded at Sonic Ranch in Tornillo, Texas, live to tape. The album received acclaim from critics.

== Critical reception ==
Professional ratings
Aggregate scores
Source	Rating
Metacritic	81/100
Review scores
Source	Rating
AllMusic	4/5 stars
Exclaim!	7/10
Mojo	4/5 stars
Pitchfork	7.2/10
The Skinny	5/5 stars
Uncut	4/5 stars
Under the Radar	7.5/10

Haunted Mountain received a score of 81 out of 100 on review aggregator Metacritic based on eight critics' reviews, indicating "universal acclaim". Mojo felt that "the songs are wonderfully non-toxic, obsessed in only the best possible way, [and] a refreshing take on country love and lust". Uncut felt that Meek and producer Mat Davidson "gave the record a much more expansive, full-sounding presentation, a resounding and confident tone that matches these optimistic and often unfiltered emotions".

AllMusic's Marcy Donelson wrote that the album "retains Buck's good-natured, rustic alt-country qualities, with the synths and live spontaneity providing touches of atmosphere and whimsy", calling it an "album of many strengths—poetic yet folksy lyrics, charming melodies, an A-plus band, and disarming sincerity". Stephen M. Deusner described it as "full of songs about getting lost and finding yourself, about the pleasure of disorientation and the new perspective reorientation can bring".

Eric Hill of Exclaim! remarked that the "psychedelic twist" of songs like "Undae Dunes" is "what gives Haunted Mountain, and much of Meek's discography, the fuel to rocket past so many nostalgia-minded country bandwagoners". Reviewing the album for The Skinny, Jo Higgs stated that it "engages a wider dynamic variety than either of Meek's two prior solo records, reaching further towards both jolting rock arrangements and lullingly mesmeric minimalism". Chris Thiessen of Under the Radar opined that "aided by his folk-rocking instrumentalists, [Meek] delivers his fullest and most complete project to date".

== Track listing ==
Haunted Mountain track listing
No.	Title	Writer(s)	Length
1.	"Mood Ring"	Buck Meek	3:53
2.	"Haunted Mountain"	Meek; Jolie Holland	5:11
3.	"Paradise"	Meek; Holland	3:39
4.	"Cyclades"	Meek; Adam Brisbin	4:44
5.	"Secret Side"	Meek	3:25
6.	"Didn't Know You Then"	Meek	4:13
7.	"Undae Dunes"	Meek	2:39
8.	"Where You're Coming From"	Meek; Holland	3:57
9.	"Lullabies"	Meek; Holland	4:41
10.	"Lagrimas"	Meek; Holland	3:42
11.	"The Rainbow"	Meek; Judee Sill^{[a]}	2:05
Total length:			42:00

=== Note ===
- ^{^[a]} "The Rainbow" consists of unpublished lyrics by Sill from "her final journal entry", and music composed by Meek.

== Personnel ==
Credits adapted from the album's liner notes.

- Mat Davidson – production, pedal steel, guitar, piano, fiddle, vocals
- Adrian Olsen – engineering, mixing, modular synthesizers
- Felipe Castaneda – assistant engineering
- Heba Kadry – mastering
- Adam Brisbin – guitar, piano, vocals
- Buck Meek – guitar, vocals, photography
- Dylan Meek – piano, synthesizers
- Austin Vaughn – drums, percussion, vocals
- Ken Woodward – bass, vocals
- Germaine van der Sanden – cover photograph
- Phil Weinrobe – crop
- Robbie Jeffers – photography
- Elise Leasure – album design

== Charts ==
Chart performance for Haunted Mountain
Chart (2023)	Peak position
UK Album Downloads (OCC)	59
US Top Current Album Sales (Billboard)	82
