= James Krivchenia =

American drummer (born 1988)

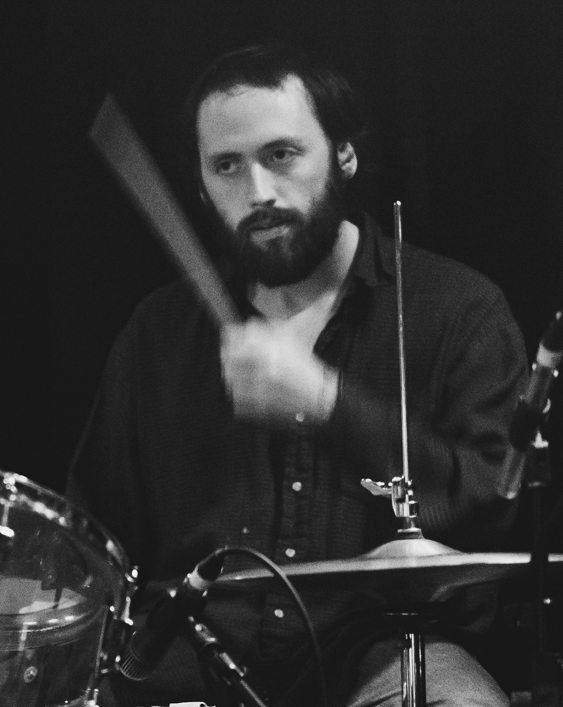
- Krivchenia performing with Big Thief in 2017

Background information
- Born: James Foster Krivchenia; December 8, 1988 (age 37)
- Origin: Chicago, Illinois, U.S.
- Occupations: Musician, record producer
- Instrument: Drums
- Years active: 2014–present
- Labels: Left Door Tapes, Reading Group, Planet Mu
- Member of: Big Thief, Mega Bog
- Website: jameskrivchenia.bandcamp.com

James Foster Krivchenia (born December 8, 1988) is an American musician and producer, best known as the drummer of the indie rock band Big Thief. Krivchenia joined Big Thief in 2015 following his work with the band as a sound engineer. He later produced the band's fifth studio album, Dragon New Warm Mountain I Believe In You (2022), which received a nomination for Best Alternative Music Album at the 65th Annual Grammy Awards.

In addition to his work with Big Thief, he is a regular collaborator of Mega Bog as a longtime engineer, co-producer and percussionist and has released four solo albums: No Comment (2018), A New Found Relaxation (2020), Blood Karaoke (2022) and Performing Belief (2025).

== Early life and education ==
Krivchenia was born in Minneapolis and raised in Chicago. He began playing drums in his elementary school music class and went on to attend Berklee College of Music in Boston.

== Career ==
Krivchenia moved to New York following his graduation from Berklee, where he played in local bands and worked as a sound engineer at various recording studios. Krivchenia met Adrianne Lenker, Buck Meek, and Max Oleartchik (of Big Thief) in 2015 through mutual friends and was hired to engineer the band's debut studio album, Masterpiece. He replaced the band's original drummer in 2016, even though they had never heard him play. He has played drums on every subsequent Big Thief release. As a part of Big Thief, Krivchenia has received a nomination for Best Rock Performance at the 63rd Grammy Awards for "Not," and a nomination for Best Alternative Music Album for "U.F.OF." at the 62nd Annual Grammy Awards.

In 2022, Krivchenia produced Big Thief's Dragon New Warm Mountain I Believe In You, a double LP which garnered widespread critical acclaim. Krivchenia had conceived of the recording plan in 2019, which involved sessions in four different locations: Upstate New York; Topanga, California; the Colorado Rockies; and Tucson, Arizona. This plan intended to capture the various dimensions of Lenker's songwriting and the band's dynamic playing on a single record. The album received nominations for Best Alternative Music Album at the 65th Grammy Awards, while the song "Certainty" received a nomination for Best Alternative Music Performance.

As a session musician, Krivchenia has played drums and percussion on recordings by multiple artists, including Taylor Swift's Speak Now (Taylor's Version), Red (Taylor's Version) and Midnights, as well as on Ben Howard's Collections from the Whiteout, Gracie Abrams's Good Riddance and Ed Sheeran's − (Subtract) and Autumn Variations.

== Discography ==
=== Solo albums ===
- No Comment (Left Door Tapes, 2018)
- A New Found Relaxation (self-released, 2020)
- Blood Karaoke (Reading Group, 2022)
- Performing Belief (Planet Mu, 2025)

=== With Big Thief ===
- Capacity (Saddle Creek, 2017)
- U.F.O.F. (4AD, 2019)
- Two Hands (4AD, 2019)
- Dragon New Warm Mountain I Believe in You (4AD, 2022)
- Double Infinity (4AD, 2025)

=== With Mega Bog ===
- Dolphine (Paradise of Bachelors, 2019)
- Life, and Another (Paradise of Bachelors, 2021)
- End of Everything (Mexican Summer, 2023)
