= Katie Von Schleicher =

American singer

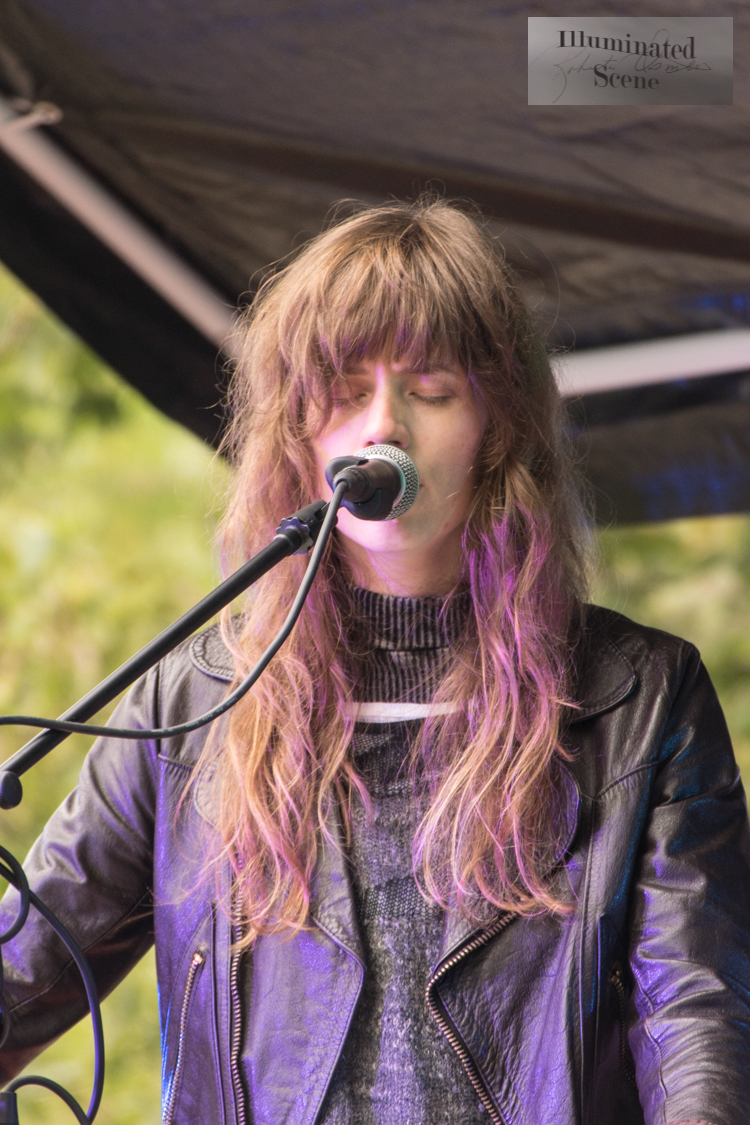

Background information
- Born: Pasadena, Maryland, United States
- Genre: Indie rock
- Instruments: Vocals; piano; guitar; synthesizer; drums
- Years active: 2012-
- Labels: Ba Da Bing! Records, Full Time Hobby
- Member of: Wilder Maker
- Website: www.k-v-s.net

Katie Von Schleicher is an American songwriter and musician based in Brooklyn, New York. She is the keyboardist and co-lead vocalist of Wilder Maker.

== History ==
In 2015, Von Schleicher signed with Ba Da Bing! Records to release her debut mini-album Bleaksploitation. The album was met with favorable reviews.

Von Schleicher is known for her dark pop songs, often recorded on four-track cassette.

Her debut full-length Shitty Hits was praised by Pitchfork, PopMatters, and Bandcamp. Paul Thompson described Shitty Hits as "a kaleidoscope in grayscale: creaky chamber-pop, dirge-driven doom-folk, hushed solo piano works."

== Discography ==
Year	Title	Label	Format
2012	Silent Days	Self-Released	Digital
2015	Bleaksploitation	Ba Da Bing! Records	Vinyl, CD, Cassette, Digital
2016	Lobster Palace	Ba Da Bing! Records	Cassette
2017	Shitty Hits	Ba Da Bing! Records / Full Time Hobby (UK/EU)	Vinyl, CD, Digital
2018	Glad To Be Here 7"	Ba Da Bing! Records / Full Time Hobby (UK/EU)	Vinyl, Digital
2020	Consummation	Ba Da Bing! Records / Full Time Hobby (UK/EU)	Vinyl, CD, Digital
2023	A Little Touch Of Schleicher In The Night	Sipsman (World)	Vinyl, Digital
