= Katy Kirby =

American musician

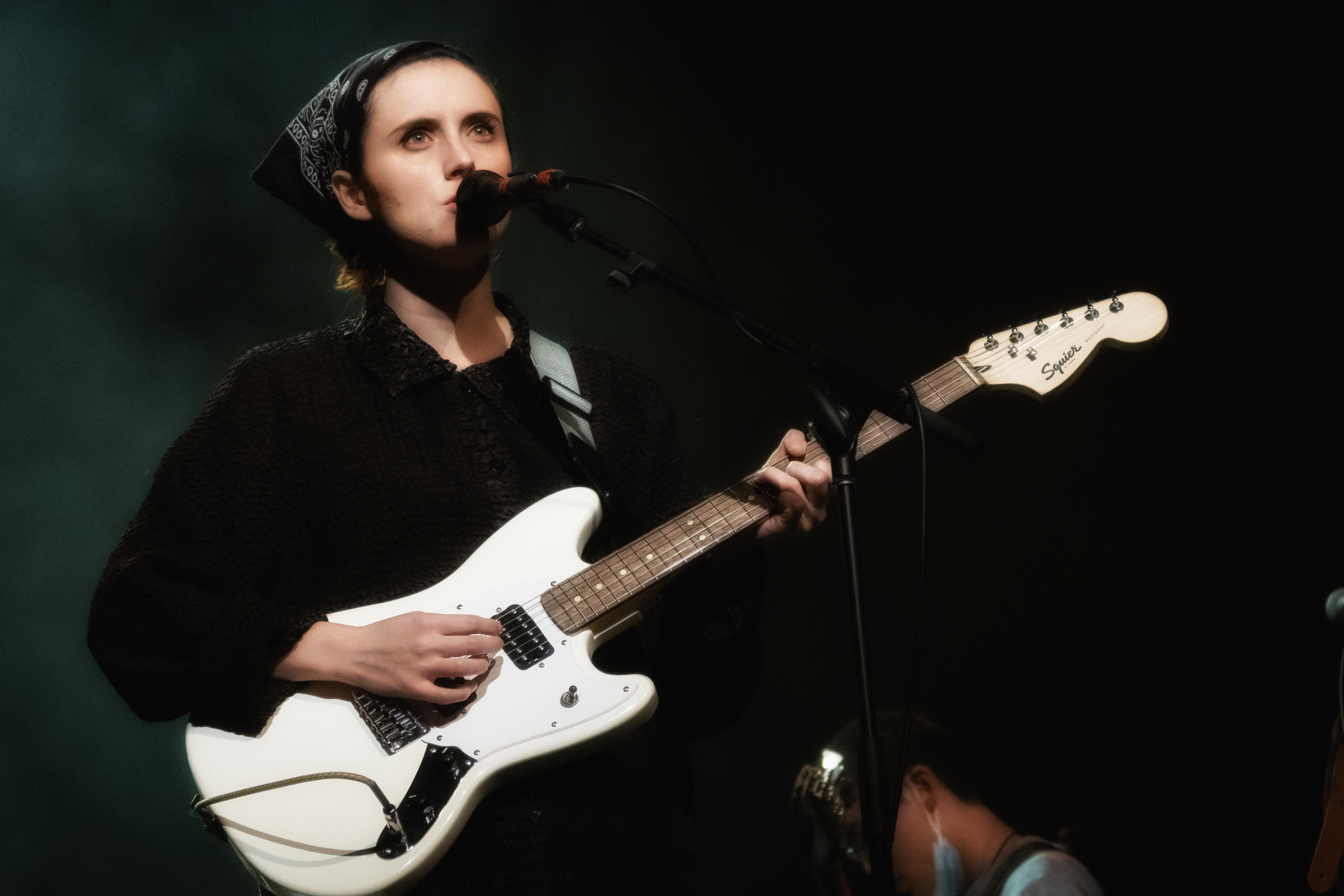
Katy Kirby at the Moore Theatre in Seattle in 2021

Kathryn Ellison Kirby is a Nashville, Tennessee based American musician and singer-songwriter from Spicewood, Texas.

== Early life ==
Kirby grew up as an evangelical Christian in Spicewood, Texas, where she was homeschooled and listened primarily to worship music. She attended college at Belmont University, where she majored in English.

== Career ==
Kirby began releasing music in 2018, with the EP Juniper. In May 2020, she shared a new recorded version of her song "Tap Twice".

In late 2020, she announced plans to release her debut album and, along with the announcement, released the single "Traffic!" The album, Cool Dry Place, came out on February 19, 2021, and became Stereogum's "Album of the Week". The album would eventually be included in a number of yearend best-albums-of-2021 lists, including those by Paste, Our Culture Mag, and Consequence of Sound.

In 2023, Kirby signed to ANTI- Records and announced her sophomore album, Blue Raspberry, released January 2024. Following this, she embarked on an American and European tour in support of the album. In August, Kirby was featured on NPR's Tiny Desk Concert Series.

== Artistry ==
According to Marcy Donelson of AllMusic, Kirby's "perceptive lyrics are spun through warm, articulate vocals and an adult-alternative style."

== Personal life ==
Kirby currently resides in Brooklyn, New York. Kirby is openly queer.

== Discography ==
Katy Kirby - 01 - Every Time

Katy Kirby - 02 - Come Back to Nashville

Katy Kirby - 03 - All of Everything

=== Studio albums ===
- Cool Dry Place (2021, Keeled Scales)
- Blue Raspberry (2024)

=== EPs ===
- Juniper (2018, Keeled Scales)
