= Consummation (disambiguation) =

Consummation is the first act of sexual intercourse between two individuals, either following their marriage or a prolonged sexual attraction.

Consummation can also refer to:

- Consummation (The Thad Jones/Mel Lewis Orchestra album), 1970
- Consummation (Katie von Schleicher album), 2020
- Consummation of the ages, crucifixion of Jesus, viewed as act of atonement
