= Keeled Scales =

- Founded: 2014; 12 years ago
- Founder: Tony Presley; Seth Whaland
- Distributors: Secretly Distribution, Polyvinyl Records
- Genre: Indie rock
- Country of origin: U.S.
- Location: Austin, Texas
- Official website: www.keeledscales.com

Keeled Scales is an independent record label based in Austin, Texas. It was founded in 2014 by musicians Tony Presley (Real Live Tigers) and Seth Whaland (Literature, Tres Oui). The label has released over 60 albums from artists such as Buck Meek (of Big Thief), Katy Kirby, Lunar Vacation, Sun June and more.

In 2020, the label helped curate a benefit compilation to support the Estok’Gna, an indigenous Texas tribe, in their efforts to protest the building of a gas pipeline through their lands.

In 2021, Keeled Scales entered into a partnership with fellow indie label Polyvinyl Records, but still retains creative control over its operations.

Also in 2021, the Austin Chronicle named Keeled Scales “Best Quiet Giant,” praising the label for its “stacked roster and tastemaking reputation.”

== Discography ==
The following are the albums released by the label:

1. The Room Outside – The Room Outside
2. Real Live Tigers – Tomboys
3. The Shivers – Charades
4. Mandarin Dynasty – Feedback Time
5. Real Live Tigers – Denatured
6. Justin Peter Kinkel-Schuster – Date With The End
7. Dubb Nubb – It's Weird In This World
8. Caitlin Kraus – Waiting For The World
9. LRN GRN – Easy Spirits/Grape Perfume
10. Adam Torres – Pearls To Swine
11. Justin Peter Kinkel-Schuster – Constant Stranger
12. Lindsay Clark – Home of the Brave
13. Lindsay Clark – Begin
14. Knife in the Water – Reproduction
15. Human Behavior – Cancer: As Seen From Basement
16. Future Museums – Visible Nest
17. RF Shannon – Other Trails
18. Julia Lucille – Chthonic
19. Julia Lucille – Bedroom Tapes, Vol. 1
20. Brice Randall Bickford – PARO
21. LRN GRN – No Water/Only Light
22. Moses Nesh – No Labor-Saving Machine
23. Alex Dupree – You Winsome, You Lonesome
24. M. Bailey Stephenson – Sitting with Sounds and Listening for Ghosts
25. David Dondero – Spider West Myshkin and a City Bus
26. Katy Kirby – Juniper
27. Twain – Rare Feeling
28. Future Museums – Heart Pulp
29. Lake Mary – River Ceremony
30. Buck Meek – Buck Meek
31. Sun June – Years
32. Twain – 2 E.P.s
33. Jo Schornikow – Secret Weapon
34. Sun June – Jeff Demos (tour cassette)
35. Twain – Adventure
36. Jordan Moser – Long Night
37. Erin Durant – Islands
38. Will Johnson – Wire Mountain
39. Sun June – Somewhere
40. RF Shannon – Rain On Dust
41. David Dondero – The Transient
42. The Deer – Do No Harm
43. Buck Meek – Two Saviors
44. Tenci – My Heart Is An Open Field
45. Adam Ostrar – The Worried Coat
46. Katy Kirby – Cool Dry Place
47. Good Looks – Bummer Year
48. Will Johnson – El Capitan
49. Moriah Bailey – I Tried Words
50. Renée Reed – s/t
51. Jo Schornikow – Altar
52. Karima Walker – Waking the Dreaming Body
53. Jordan Moser – Peril
54. Twain – Noon
55. Lunar Vacation – Inside Every Fig is a Dead Wasp
56. RF Shannon – Red Swan in Palmetto
57. Alex Dupree – Thieves
58. Tenci – A Swollen River, A Well Overflowing
59. The Deer – The Beautiful Undead
60. Rae Fitzgerald – Say I Look Happy
61. Meernaa – So Far So Good
62. Why Bonnie – 90 in November
63. Will Johnson – No Ordinary Crown
64. Karima Walker – demos
