= U.F.O.F. =

Studio album by Big Thief
- Released: May 3, 2019
- Recorded: June 2018
- Studio: Bear Creek, Woodinville, WA
- Genre: Folk rock; indie folk; indie rock; Americana; dream pop; art rock
- Length: 43:15
- Label: 4AD
- Producer: Andrew Sarlo

Big Thief chronology
Capacity (2017)	U.F.O.F. (2019)	Two Hands (2019)

Singles from U.F.O.F.
- 1. "U.F.O.F." Released: February 26, 2019; 2. "Cattails" Released: April 3, 2019; 3. "Century" Released: April 30, 2019

U.F.O.F. is the third studio album by the American band Big Thief, released through 4AD on May 3, 2019.

The album was recorded in June 2018 at Bear Creek Studio, a secluded studio with lush nature surroundings in Woodinville, Washington. The songs "From" and "Terminal Paradise" previously appeared in a different form on Adrianne Lenker's 2018 solo album Abysskiss. The title initials stand for "UFO friend", according to lyrics in the title track. The album received acclaim from music critics and was nominated for Best Alternative Music Album at the 62nd Annual Grammy Awards.

Five months after the album's release, Big Thief released their fourth studio album, Two Hands. Described as the "earth twin" to U.F.O.F., it was recorded at Sonic Ranch in the Chihuahuan Desert of Texas days after the band completed recording for U.F.O.F. in Washington.

== Recording ==
The album was recorded at Bear Creek Studio, in Woodinville, Washington. Many of the songs started to take shape on tour, but the band continued to experiment, resulting in some of the songs being written only hours before recording them. They recorded in a large room, with the band recording their tracks live.

== Music and lyrics ==
Jeremy Larson of Pitchfork described the album as having "lush" instrumentals to accompany Adrianne Lenker's "lonely and elliptical" lyrics.

== Critical reception ==
Professional ratings
Aggregate scores
Source	Rating
AnyDecentMusic?	8.4/10
Metacritic	87/100
Review scores
Source	Rating
AllMusic	4.5/5 stars
The Guardian	4/5 stars
The Independent	4/5 stars
Mojo	4/5 stars
The Observer	4/5 stars
Pitchfork	9.2/10
Q	4/5 stars
Rolling Stone	4/5 stars
Uncut	9/10
Vice (Expert Witness)	A−

U.F.O.F. received critical acclaim upon release. On Metacritic, which uses a normalized rating from music critics, the album holds a score of 87 out of 100 based on 24 reviews, indicating "universal acclaim".

The album was named "Best New Music" by Pitchfork, with a score of 9.2/10 and the website calling the album the band's "undoubtedly best" and "a mesmerizing flood of life filtered down into a concentrated drip." In 2020, AllMusic named U.F.O.F. as one of the best albums of the 2010s.

== Track listing ==
All tracks are written by Adrianne Lenker.

No.	Title	Length
1.	"Contact"	3:54
2.	"U.F.O.F."	3:08
3.	"Cattails"	4:05
4.	"From"	3:58
5.	"Open Desert"	3:47
6.	"Orange"	3:30
7.	"Century"	3:07
8.	"Strange"	3:41
9.	"Betsy"	3:28
10.	"Terminal Paradise"	3:25
11.	"Jenni"	4:11
12.	"Magic Dealer"	3:01
Total length:		43:15

== Personnel ==
Credits adapted from the album's liner notes.

Big Thief

- Adrianne Lenker – acoustic guitar (1–7, 9, 10), electric guitar (1, 5, 8, 9, 11), vocals (all tracks), choir (2, 4, 5, 8), SK5 (2, 10), piano (3), chimes (5), breath (8), percussion (8), ambience (12)
- Buck Meek – electric guitar (1–5, 7–10), clap (4), choir (4), vocals (7, 10), feedback (11), ambience (12)
- James Krivchenia – drums (1–5, 7–11), percussion (2), choir (2, 4, 5), SK5 (2), magic box (4, 5, 8), chimes (5), breath (8), Moog (8), tambourine (9), vocals (11), drum fill (12), ambience (12)
- Max Oleartchik – bass (1, 2, 4, 5, 7–12), bass drone (1–3, 8, 10), choir (2, 4), piano (3), bells (4), breath (8), shaker (8), ambience (12)

Additional musicians

- Zoë Lenker – choir (4)
- Andrew Sarlo – wind (9), ambience (12)
- Dom Monks – ambience (12)

Technical

- Dom Monks – engineering, mixing
- Andrew Sarlo – production
- Greg Calbi – mastering
- Taylor Carroll – assistant engineering, "studio brain"

Artwork

- Dustin Condren – cover photography
- Sarah Schiesser – design, layout
- Alison Fielding – production design

== Charts ==
Chart (2019)	Peak position
Belgian Albums (Ultratop Flanders)	26
Dutch Albums (Album Top 100)	80
Irish Albums (IRMA)	81
Scottish Albums (OCC)	21
Swiss Albums (Schweizer Hitparade)	68
UK Albums (OCC)	41
UK Independent Albums (OCC)	9
US Billboard 200	142
US Americana/Folk Albums (Billboard)	3
US Top Alternative Albums (Billboard)	13
US Top Rock Albums (Billboard)	26
US Vinyl Albums (Billboard)	2
