= Consummation (Katie von Schleicher album) =

Studio album by Katie Von Schleicher
- Released: May 22, 2020
- Label: Ba Da Bing

Katie Von Schleicher chronology
Glad To Be Here (2018)	Consummation (2020)

Singles from Consummation
- 1. "Caged Sleep" Released: February 25, 2020

Professional ratings
Aggregate scores
Source	Rating
Metacritic	79/100
Review scores
Source	Rating
AllMusic	4/5 stars
Clash	8/10
The Independent	4/5 stars
Loud and Quiet	7/10
NME	4/5 stars
Paste	7.7/10
Pitchfork	7.4/10

Consummation is the third studio album by American musician Katie Von Schleicher. It was released on May 22, 2020, under Ba Da Bing Records.

== Critical reception ==
Consummation was met with "generally favorable" reviews from critics. At Metacritic, which assigns a weighted average rating out of 100 to reviews from mainstream publications, this release received an average score of 79, based on 8 reviews.

== Track listing ==
Consummation track listing
No.	Title	Length
1.	"You Remind Me"	2:56
2.	"Wheel"	2:16
3.	"Nowhere"	3:40
4.	"Caged Sleep"	3:04
5.	"Messenger"	2:36
6.	"Loud"	3:17
7.	"Strangest Thing"	1:19
8.	"Can You Help?"	2:01
9.	"Brutality"	3:06
10.	"Hammer"	2:36
11.	"Power"	4:29
12.	"Gross"	3:31
13.	"Nothing Lasts"	3:04
