= Capacity (album) =

Studio album by Big Thief
- Released: June 9, 2017
- Studios: Outlier Inn Recording (Woodridge, New York); Figure 8 Recording (Brooklyn); Lethe Lounge (New York City); Black Lodge Recording (Brooklyn) (Note: Additional overdubs recorded at Black Lodge Recording in Brooklyn, New York)
- Genres: Indie rock; folk rock; indie folk; Americana
- Length: 41:40
- Label: Saddle Creek
- Producer: Andrew Sarlo

Big Thief chronology
Masterpiece (2016)	Capacity (2017)	U.F.O.F. (2019)

Singles from Capacity
- 1. "Mythological Beauty" Released: April 22, 2017; 2. "Shark Smile" Released: May 8, 2017

Capacity is the second studio album by the American band Big Thief, released through Saddle Creek Records on June 9, 2017.

== Background and recording ==
Capacity was recorded in a farmhouse that the band was house-sitting. With the owner out of town, the band was able to record uninterrupted for a month. The album was recorded on analog recording equipment.

== Music and lyrics ==
According to Lizzie Manno of Paste Magazine: "Big Thief thrive on the magic they unearth seemingly from a past life. Lenker delivers poetic lines about nature that never appear trite with a voice that ranges from gentle to fierce, always with a mother-like comfort. [...] Capacity draws on earth's passing moments that are taken for granted, but it's grounded in humanity's brightest and darkest tendencies. Their tender, evocative indie-folk transcends any musical categorization."

== Artwork ==
The album's cover artwork features a photograph of vocalist Adrianne Lenker's uncle holding her as a newborn.

== Critical reception ==
Professional ratings
Aggregate scores
Source	Rating
AnyDecentMusic?	8.0/10
Metacritic	81/100
Review scores
Source	Rating
AllMusic	4/5 stars
The A.V. Club	B
Consequence of Sound	B
Exclaim!	9/10
Mojo	3/5 stars
Pitchfork	8.3/10
Rolling Stone	4/5 stars
The Skinny	4/5 stars
Uncut	8/10
Vice	B+

Capacity received critical acclaim upon its release. At Metacritic, which assigns a normalized rating out of 100 to reviews from music critics, the album has received an average score of 81, indicating "universal acclaim", based on 15 reviews.

Paste Magazine included the album in their list of the best indie rock albums of the 2010s. Staff writer Lizzie Manno said "[the album is] dirty, heartbreaking, trustworthy, gorgeous and armed with a childlike wonder and well-worn sagacity. While their 2016 debut Masterpiece offered raw charm, 2017's Capacity has a keener eye and an intoxicating richness."

=== Accolades ===
Publication	Accolade	Rank	Ref
The Alternative	The Alternative's Top 50 Albums of 2017	10	
BrooklynVegan	BrooklynVegan's Top 50 Albums of 2017	13	
Flood Magazine	The Best Albums of 2017	1	
NPR	The 50 Best Albums of 2017	3	
Pitchfork	The 50 Best Albums of 2017	23	
Rough Trade	Rough Trade Albums of the Year 2017	4	
The Skinny	The Skinny's Top 50 Albums of 2017	12	
Spin	50 Best Albums of 2017	2	
Vinyl Me, Please	The Best Albums of 2017	8	

== Track listing ==
All tracks are written by Adrianne Lenker, except where noted.

No.	Title	Length
1.	"Pretty Things"	3:05
2.	"Shark Smile"	4:00
3.	"Capacity"	3:52
4.	"Watering" (Adrianne Lenker, Zoë Lenker)	3:22
5.	"Coma"	3:40
6.	"Great White Shark"	3:23
7.	"Mythological Beauty"	5:06
8.	"Objects"	2:43
9.	"Haley"	3:33
10.	"Mary"	5:30
11.	"Black Diamonds"	3:35
Total length:		41:40

== Personnel ==
Credits adapted from the album's liner notes.

Big Thief

- Adrianne Lenker – vocals (all tracks), acoustic guitar (1, 2, 4–7, 9), electric guitar (2–8, 11), background vocals (2, 4, 6, 8, 11), choir (3), French press (3), mouth trumpet (7), claps (8), ARP synthesizer (9)
- Buck Meek – electric guitar (2–4, 6–9, 11), choir (3), background vocals (5, 6, 8, 9), claps (8)
- Max Oleartchik – upright bass (1, 3), bass (2, 4–9, 11), choir (3)
- James Krivchenia – drums (2–9, 11), percussion (2–9), choir (3), Casio SK-1 (5), bells (6), howls (6), acoustic guitar (6), claps (8, 9), lap harp (8), background vocals (9), organ (10)

Additional musicians

- Andrew Sarlo – piano (1), choir (3), mouth trumpet (7)
- Unknown – stairs (1)
- Zoë Lenker – background vocals (4, 7, 8)
- Mat Davidson – background vocals (5, 6, 9), acoustic guitar (8), pump organ (8, 10), piano (10)
- Erin Birgy – howls (6)
- Michael Sachs – bass clarinet (10)

Technical personnel

- Andrew Sarlo – production (all tracks), engineering (all tracks), mixing (all tracks)
- Greg Calbi – mastering
- Josh Druckman – engineering [basics] (8)

Artwork

- Josh Goleman – band photo
