= Blue Raspberry (album) =

Studio album by Katy Kirby
- Released: January 26, 2024
- Studio: Addiction Sound (Nashville); Figure 8 (New York City); Home of Katy Kirby; Home studio of Harvey and Julia Arnold; Livingrooms (New York City); Studio 19 (New York City); Studio G (New York City); Le Tricyle (Nashville); Trout Recording (New York City)
- Genre: Indie folk
- Length: 38:18
- Label: Anti-
- Producer: Austin Arnold; Logan Chung; Katy Kirby; Alberto Sewald

Katy Kirby chronology
Cool Dry Place (2021)	Blue Raspberry (2024)

Blue Raspberry is the second studio album by American singer-songwriter Katy Kirby, released on January 26, 2024. The album is Kirby's first for Anti-, explores lyrical themes of romantic exploration, and has received positive reviews from critics.

== Reception ==
Professional ratings
Review scores
Source	Rating
Exclaim!	8/10
The Line of Best Fit	8/10
Loud and Quiet	7/10
The Observer	4/5 stars
The Skinny	3/5 stars

Editors at AnyDecentMusic? characterized 15 critic scores as a 7.7 out of 10. According to the review aggregator Metacritic, Blue Raspberry received "universal acclaim" based on a weighted average score of 81 out of 100 from 12 critic scores.

Editors at AllMusic rated this album 4 out of 5 stars, with critic Marcy Donelson writing Kirby "moves a step closer toward classic singer/songwriter form with a more reserved, vocals-forward set of songs accompanied by a more subdued band presence and orchestral textures that looked to albums such as Andy Shauf's The Party and Lomelda's Hannah as models". The Associated Press' Kiana Doyle assessed that the album works because "Kirby takes her time with each track" and noting the variety of instrumentation. At BrooklynVegan, Andrew Sacher considers the music genre to be one "that bridges the gap between Americana-friendly indie and '70s folk rock, sitting as nicely next to past tourmate Waxahatchee as she would next to a classic Linda Ronstadt record". A 7 out of 10 came from Tom Kingsley at Clash Music, who noted a Nashville sound and compared this music to Lucy Dacus and Waxahatchee. Writing for Dork, Emma Quin gave this release 4 out of 5 stars, as "each instrument and texture gets its moment to shine; the production is anything but simple – it is beautiful in its meticulousness.". Sam Boer of Exclaim! rated this release an 8 out of 10, stating that "Kirby's lyrics tend toward clinical precision" and with this music, she "marvels at the human desire to blend the lies and truths we embody every day into something delicious".

Another 8 out of 10 came from Adele Julia of The Line of Best Fit, who also praised Kirby's lyrics, writing that on this album, they are "showcasing its sheer range from the earnest theatrics of "Drop Dead" to the quiet craving on "Wait Listen"". Loud and Quiet's Tristan Gatward rated this work 7 out of 10, summing up "the album's strength is its overall lack of flourish: it's an unceasing blend of boredom, charm and anxiety – and always innately human". Critics at NPR's All Songs Considered included this among the four best albums of the week. In No Depression Maeri Ferguson ended her review: "Kirby's intricate arrangements beckon a close listening of this record. It's the surest way to catch every devastating inch of her phrasing and the detailed picture she paints with it. To spend the time with Blue Raspberry is to be totally broken apart by it, but like Kirby, eventually pieced back together, ready to jump in again." In The Observer, Kitty Empire rated Blue Raspberry 4 out of 5 stars, writing that "this set of songs traces the blossoming of a love affair with unshowy instrumentation and understated charm". Miranda Wollen of Paste rated Blur Raspberry an 8.4 out of 10 for being "a smart, sexy thinkpiece on queer romance in a world on fire" with a "calm, steady sense of purpose [that] carries through, creating a gorgeous, ruminative contemplation on queer desire that will leave longtime fans and new listeners alike bobbing their heads—and reaching for their thesauruses". The editorial staff included this among the best albums of January. Writing for Pitchfork, Emma Madden rated this work a 7.4 out of 10, praising Kirby's lyrics, but critiquing that she sometimes overwrites and continuing that "the songs themselves are soft and sauntering, built around close-mic'd guitar and piano and occasionally offset with strange, barely perceptible flourishes that evoke subtle unease".

Jon M. Gilbertson of The Shepherd Express highlighted the tension between artificiality and authenticity in this album, writing that Kirby "responds to the ersatz with well-crafted naturalism". In The Skinny, Tony Inglis stated that "Kirby is funny, scathing and full of clarity about her personal epiphanies" and emphasized the musician's growth from her first full-length; he rated it 3 out of 5 stars. At Sputnikmusic, BlushfulHippocrene rated this 4.0 out of 5, calling similar to Kirby's last album, but with "some extremely slight but thoughtful experimentation from Kirby". Editors at Stereogum chose this for Album of the Week and critic James Rettig opined that this album "finds [Kirby] taking action on those feelings [from Cool Dry Place] and stumbling into new struggles" with lyrics that explore intimate relationships and authenticity. Mark Moody of Under the Radar gave this work an 7 out of 10, stating that while "there are a few songs that fall short of Blue Raspberry's overall mark", this music is "as real as it gets and in its most composed moments a confident step forward". Grant Sharples of Uproxx included this among the best indie music of the week, calling it "a masterful exercise in restraint, one in which the most memorable moments come from its quietude".

Prior to the album's release, Under the Radar's Mark Redfern included lead single "Cubic Zirconia" among the 10 best songs of the week.

== Track listing ==
All songs written (and sung) by Katy Kirby, except where noted.

1. "Redemption Arc" – 3:22
2. "Fences" – 1:41
3. "Cubic Zirconia" (Austin Arnold, Logan Chung, Kirby, and Alberto Sewald) – 4:04
4. "Hand to Hand" – 3:47
5. "Wait Listen" – 4:33
6. "Drop Dead" – 3:19
7. "Party of the Century" (Chung, Christian Lee Hutson, and Kirby) – 2:41
8. "Alexandria" – 4:48
9. "Salt Crystal" – 3:21
10. "Blue Raspberry" – 4:41
11. "Table" (Chung and Kirby) – 2:01

== Personnel ==
Musicians

- Katy Kirby – vocals, piano on "Redemption Arc"; guitar on "Fences", "Cubic Zirconia", "Hand to Hand", "Wait Listen", and "Blue Raspberry"; bass guitar on "Hand to Hand"; synthesizer on "Hand to Hand"; Wurlitzer on "Blue Raspberry"
- Austin Arnold – drums on "Fences", "Cubic Zirconia", "Wait Listen", "Drop Dead", "Party of the Century", "Alexandria", "Salt Crystal", and "Table"; percussion on "Drop Dead" and "Party of the Century"; synthesizer on "Blue Raspberry"
- Sean Brennan – cello on "Party of the Century" and "Alexandria"
- Logan Chung – bass guitar on "Redemption Arc", "Cubic Zirconia", "Salt Crystal", and "Table"; guitar on "Cubic Zirconia", "Hand to Hand", "Wait Listen", "Drop Dead", "Party of the Century", "Alexandria", "Salt Crystal", "Blue Raspberry", and "Table"; piano on "Cubic Zirconia", "Wait Listen", "Party of the Century", and "Salt Crystal"; Rhodes piano on"Cubic Zirconia"; synthesizer on "Cubic Zirconia", "Hand to Hand", "Alexandria", and "Blue Raspberry"; Mellotron on "Drop Dead" and "Party of the Century"; Wurlitzer on "Party of the Century"; background vocals on "Party of the Century"; keyboards on "Alexandria" and "Table"; organ on "Blue Raspberry"
- Ross Collier – Omnichord on "Blue Raspberry"
- Corin Dubie – French horn on "Redemption Arc", "Salt Crystal", and "Blue Raspberry"
- Jacob Haymans – flugelhorn, trumpet on "Redemption Arc", "Salt Crystal", and "Blue Raspberry"
- Austin Hoke – cello on "Redemption Arc" and "Salt Crystal"
- Harriette Hull – background vocals on "Drop Dead"
- Nick Johnston – keyboards on "Table"
- Jane Lai – background vocals on "Drop Dead"
- Christian Medrano – background vocals on "Drop Dead"
- Julia Meredith – clarinet, flute on "Redemption Arc" and "Salt Crystal"
- Rowen Merrill – violin on "Redemption Arc" and "Salt Crystal"
- Emma Montesi – background vocals on "Drop Dead"
- Paula Ramirez – background vocals on "Drop Dead"
- Lane Rodges – piano on "Fences", synthesizer on"Wait Listen", background vocals on "Drop Dead"
- Alberto Sewald – drums on "Redemption Arc" and "Hand to Hand"; bass guitar on "Fences", "Cubic Zirconia", "Wait Listen", "Drop Dead", "Party of the Century", "Alexandria", and "Salt Crystal"; guitar on "Fences" and "Cubic Zirconia"; organ on "Cubic Zirconia"; percussion on "Cubic Zirconia"; synthesizer on "Hand to Hand" and "Alexandria"

Technical personnel

- Austin Arnold – production on "Cubic Zirconia"
- Logan Chung – production, arrangement on "Redemption Arc" and "Alexandria"
- Ross Collier – engineering on "Redemption Arc", "Hand to Hand", "Salt Crystal", and "Blue Raspberry"
- Nolan Espinal – mixing on "Party of the Century"; engineering on "Drop Dead", "Alexandria", and "Table"
- Eamon Ford – engineering on "Cubic Zirconia"
- Heba Kadry – mastering
- Katy Kirby – production on "Cubic Zirconia"
- Thomas Luminoso – engineering on "Redemption Arc", "Salt Crystal", and "Blue Raspberry"
- Rowen Merrill – arrangement on "Redemption Arc", "Salt Crystal", and "Blue Raspberry"
- Adrian Olsen – mixing on "Redemption Arc", "Hand to Hand", "Wait Listen", "Party of the Century", "Blue Raspberry", and "Table"
- George Rezek – engineering on "Wait Listen"
- Alberto Sewald – production; engineering; mixing on "Fences", "Cubic Zirconia", "Drop Dead", "Alexandria", and "Salt Crystal"
- Lily Wen – engineering on "Wait Listen" "Drop Dead", "Alexandria", and "Salt Crystal"

== See also ==
- 2024 in American music
- List of 2024 albums
