= Buck Meek =

American singer-songwriter

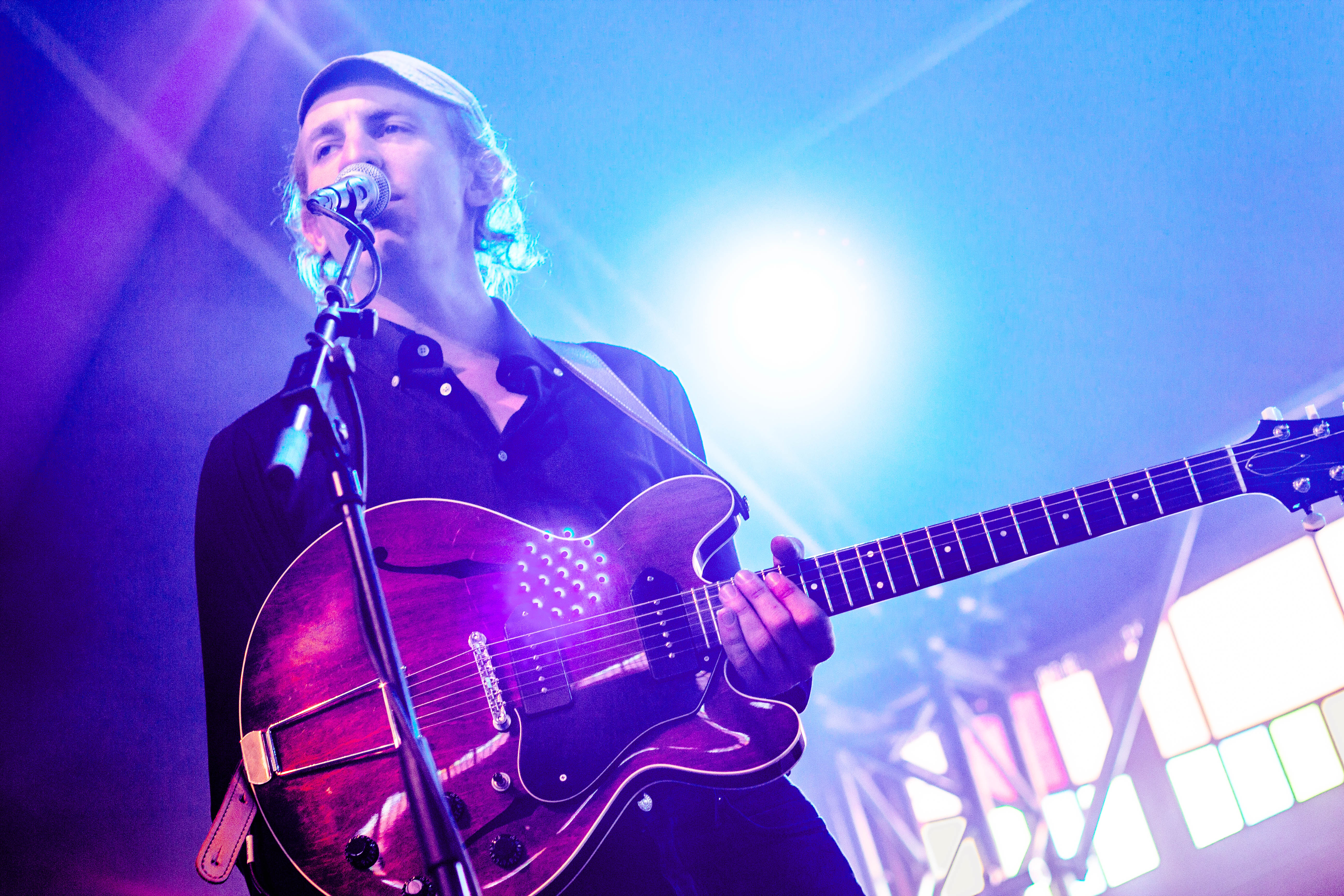
- Meek performing with Big Thief in 2018

Background information
- Born: Alexander Buckley Meek; July 10, 1987 (age 38); Wimberley, Texas, U.S.
- Genres: Folk
- Labels: Keeled Scales; 4AD
- Member of: Big Thief
- Website: buckmeekmusic.com

Alexander Buckley "Buck" Meek (born July 10, 1987) is an American folk musician from Wimberley, Texas, best known as the guitarist and backing vocalist of Big Thief. He has released four solo albums: Buck Meek (2018), Two Saviors (2021), Haunted Mountain (2023) and The Mirror (2026).

== Early life ==
Meek was raised in Texas and was introduced to the guitar at a young age, playing blues and folk at local venues in his youth. Similarly to the other members of Big Thief, Meek attended Berklee College of Music, but he did not form a band with his future bandmates until after they had graduated. After Berklee, Meek moved to New York City, busking at the 14th Street-Union Square and Bedford Avenue subway stations to pay his rent.

== Career ==
In 2014, Meek released two EPs with Adrianne Lenker, a-sides and b-sides. The following year Meek formed Big Thief with Lenker and Max Oleartchik after they met Oleartchik in Bushwick, Brooklyn, recognizing him from Berklee College. Meek has recorded five studio albums with Big Thief to critical acclaim. Their 2019 album U.F.O.F. was nominated for the Grammy Award for Best Alternative Music Album. Meek released an eponymous debut solo album in May 2018, and Two Saviors in January 2021. Two Saviors was recorded at the corner of Royal Street and Desire Street in New Orleans, Louisiana, alongside producer Andrew Sarlo, who also worked on all of Big Thief's studio albums.

Meek appeared in the Alma Har'el-directed Bob Dylan concert film Shadow Kingdom: The Early Songs of Bob Dylan, which debuted on Veeps.com on July 18, 2021.

Buck Meek and Germaine Dunes (his partner) formed the band Kisser.

== Personal life ==
Meek and bandmate Adrianne Lenker married after they met in New York. The couple divorced in 2018. He lives in Southern California with his second wife, Germaine Dunes, whom he met in the Netherlands. Buck Meek lives in Los Angeles, CA when he is not touring.

== Discography ==
=== Studio albums ===
Title	Details	Peak chart positions
Title	Details	US Curr.
Buck Meek	Released: May 18, 2018; Label: Keeled Scales; Formats: LP, CD, cassette, Digital download, streaming	—
Two Saviors	Released: January 15, 2021; Label: Keeled Scales; Formats: LP, CD, cassette, digital download, streaming	—
Haunted Mountain	Released: August 28, 2023; Label: 4AD; Formats: LP, CD, digital download, streaming	82
The Mirror	Released: February 27, 2026; Label: 4AD; Formats: LP, CD, digital download, streaming	

EPs

- a-sides (with Adrianne Lenker; Saddle Creek, 2014)
- b-sides (with Adrianne Lenker; Saddle Creek, 2014)

=== With Big Thief ===
- Masterpiece (Saddle Creek, 2016)
- Capacity (Saddle Creek, 2017)
- U.F.O.F. (4AD, 2019)
- Two Hands (4AD, 2019)
- Dragon New Warm Mountain I Believe in You (4AD, 2022)
- Double Infinity (4AD, 2025)
