= Big Thief =

American indie folk band

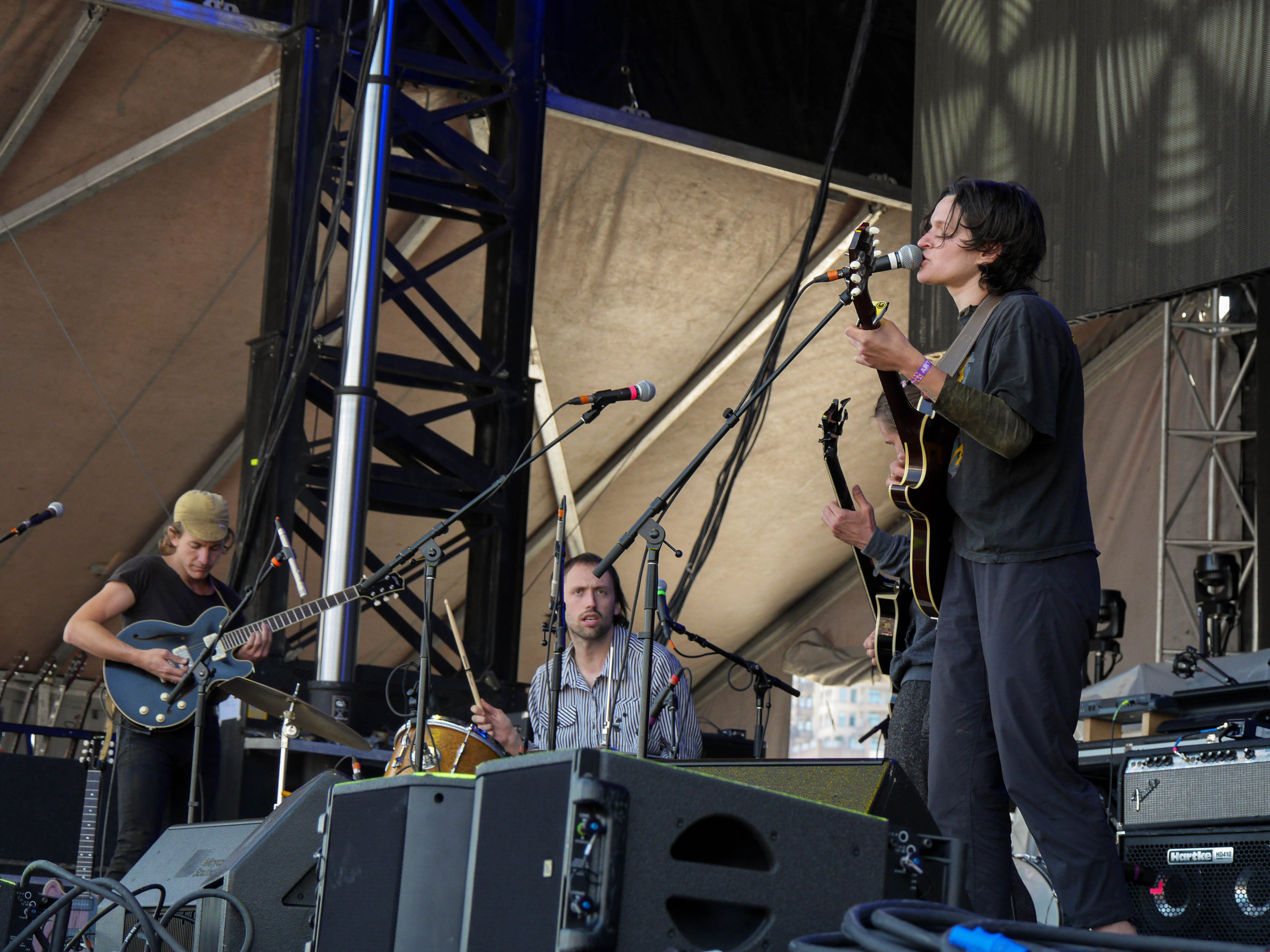
- Big Thief performing in 2018. From left to right: Buck Meek, James Krivchenia, and Adrianne Lenker (Max Oleartchik is obscured by Lenker)

Background information
- Origin: Brooklyn, New York, U.S.
- Genres: Indie folk; Americana; folk rock; indie rock; alt-country; neo-psychedelia
- Years active: 2015–present
- Labels: Saddle Creek; 4AD; Weathervane
- Members: Adrianne Lenker; Buck Meek; James Krivchenia
- Past members: Jason Burger: Max Oleartchik
- Website: bigthief.net

Big Thief is an American indie folk band formed in Brooklyn, New York, in 2015. The line-up comprises two founding members: vocalist-guitarist Adrianne Lenker and guitarist Buck Meek. Drummer James Krivchenia replaced founding drummer Jason Burger after the release of their debut album. Founding bassist Max Oleartchik left the band in June 2024, with Joshua Crumbly now playing bass for live performances.

Big Thief's debut album, Masterpiece, was released on Saddle Creek Records in 2016. Their second studio album, Capacity, was released in 2017. In 2019, the band signed to 4AD and released two studio albums: U.F.O.F. in May 2019 and Two Hands in October 2019. Both albums received critical acclaim; U.F.O.F. was nominated for Best Alternative Music Album at the 62nd Annual Grammy Awards, and the song "Not", was nominated for Best Rock Song and Best Rock Performance at the 63rd Annual Grammy Awards.

The band's fifth studio album, Dragon New Warm Mountain I Believe in You, was released in February 2022. A double album, it reached the top ten in the Netherlands and was also nominated for Best Alternative Music Album at the 2023 Grammys, while its second single "Certainty" was nominated for Best Alternative Music Performance. Oleartchik ended his nine-year stint with Big Thief in June 2024, with the band citing "interpersonal reasons" for the departure.

In September 2025, the band released its first album as a trio, Double Infinity, which was recorded with the participation of several session musicians. Following the album's release, the band added Joshua Crumbly to their live line-up.

== History ==
=== 2013–2015: Early years ===
Adrianne Lenker met Buck Meek at a show in Boston, and after meeting him again in Brooklyn as undergraduates, the pair began performing as a duo. They toured as a duo in 2013, and released two EPs, a-sides and b-sides, in 2014. In 2015, after performing for two years and developing a small grassroots following, they began looking for additional members to accompany them, and formed the band Big Thief with drummer Jason Burger and Max Oleartchik, a bassist and longtime friend of Meek's. James Krivchenia joined the band later, originally as a sound engineer and then replacing Burger as the drummer. All four members of Big Thief attended the Berklee College of Music in Boston, Massachusetts.

=== 2016–2018: Masterpiece and Capacity ===
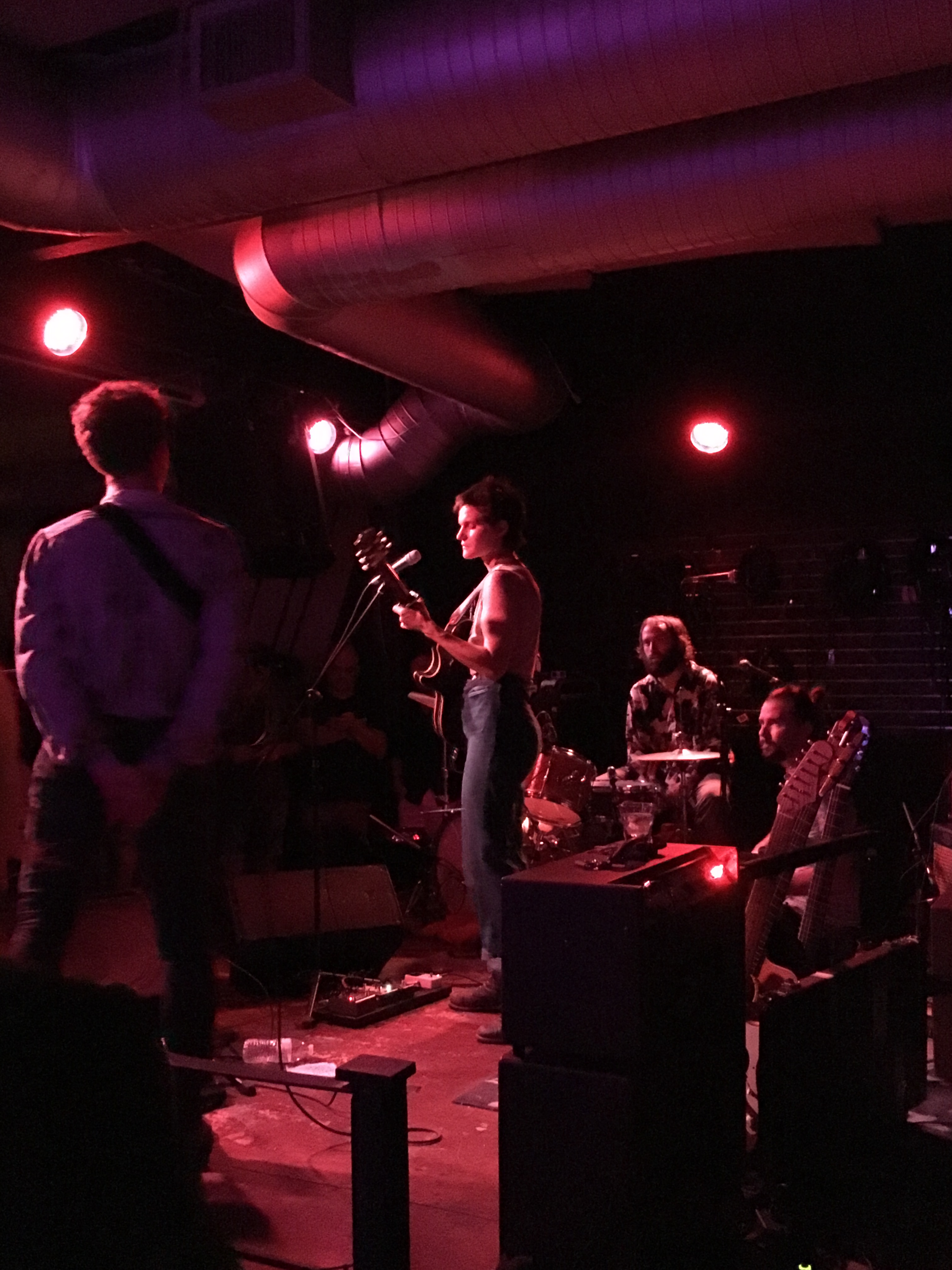
Big Thief performing at BSP in Kingston, New York, in June 2017

The band's debut studio album, Masterpiece was released on Saddle Creek Records on May 27, 2016. It received generally favorable reviews from critics; it has a rating of 79/100 on Metacritic. Bob Boilen from NPR wrote that Big Thief was "a band bound by great songs," and called the title track, Masterpiece, "one of the best songs I've heard this year." Jillian Mapes, writing for Pitchfork, gave Masterpiece a rating of 7.7 out of 10 saying the songs on the album "sound cherry-picked over a lifetime of writing". Robert Christgau described the album's songs as being "fragile, noisy images of a love perpetually out of reach". Ben Salmon wrote in the Portland Mercury that on the album Big Thief "alternately sounds like an unearthed field recording ("Little Arrow"), a pop band with a broken heart's pulse ("Vegas"), and a classic, buzzy indie-rock outfit ("Interstate")."

On April 4, 2017, Big Thief premiered a new single "Mythological Beauty" on NPR. The next day the band released the single's official video and confirmed that the song would appear on their second studio album, Capacity. The full album was released on June 9 via Saddle Creek. Capacity received critical acclaim upon its release. On Metacritic, which assigns a normalized rating out of 100 to reviews from music critics, the album received an average score of 81 indicating "universal acclaim" based on 15 reviews.

Capacity appeared on multiple album-of-the-year lists, including No. 1 on NPR's "Bob Boilen's Top Ten Album's of 2017". Boilen said, "I don't recall the last time I had the same band in my top five albums for two years in a row. But this year's Capacity (my No. 1 album) and last year's Masterpiece (my No. 4 album) did just that." Spin named Capacity No. 2 on their "50 Best Albums of 2017", citing the band's "open engagement with anguish in their bracing songs." The song "Mary" appeared on Pitchfork's 200 Best Songs of the 2010s list, at No. 44.

=== 2019–2020: U.F.O.F. and Two Hands ===
U.F.O.F., the band's third studio album, was announced on February 26, 2019. The album was recorded at Bear Creek Studio in Woodinville, Washington. On the same day they released the album's first single, its title track, "U.F.O.F.", and announced a new tour across America and in Europe. The band released two more singles, "Cattails" and "Century" ahead of the album release on May 3, 2019. U.F.O.F. received critical acclaim upon its release. It was called "Best New Music" by Pitchfork, scoring a 9.2 and came in at No. 33 on Pitchfork's 200 Best Albums of the 2010s list. At Metacritic the album received an average score of 87/100. In the first album's release week U.F.O.F. reached the top of Billboard charts, including the No. 1 position on Alternative New Artist Albums, Americana/Folk Albums, Top New Artist Albums, No. 2 placement for LP Vinyl Albums, No. 6 placement for Current Alternative Albums, No. 8 placement for Current Rock Albums, and No. 142 for Billboard Top 200 Albums. The band also had 3 sold out album release shows, one the night before the album release in LA at The Fonda Theatre on May 2, another in LA on May 3 at The Bootleg Theater, and a third night in Brooklyn, NY, at Elsewhere on May 5, 2019.

U.F.O.F. was nominated for Best Alternative Music Album at the 62nd Annual Grammy Awards.

Big Thief released their fourth studio album, Two Hands on October 11, 2019. The album was recorded at Sonic Ranch in Tornillo, Texas, shortly after the recording of U.F.O.F. and is billed as its "Earth twin". The album's lead single "Not" was nominated for Best Rock Song and Best Rock Performance at the 63rd Annual Grammy Awards.

=== 2021–2024: Dragon New Warm Mountain I Believe in You and Oleartchik's departure ===
On August 10, 2021, the band released the songs "Little Things" and "Sparrow", both of which were produced by Big Thief drummer James Krivchenia. "Little Things" was recorded with Shawn Everett at Five Star Studios in Topanga, California, in October 2020. "Sparrow" was recorded with Sam Evian at Flying Cloud Recordings in the Catskills, New York, in July and August 2020.

On September 7, 2021, the band released the song "Certainty" followed by another song, "Change", on October 6. They also announced plans for a North American tour in 2022. In the November 2021 issue of Mojo, Big Thief announced their plans to release a 20-track double album in early 2022. The album was recorded in four different locations across the United States after the band quarantined in the Vermont woods for two weeks in July 2020. Later that month the band confirmed the album's title Dragon New Warm Mountain I Believe in You and a February 11, 2022, release date.

In June 2022, the band announced two concert dates in Oleartchik's hometown of Tel Aviv, Israel, for July 6 and 7 of the same year. However, the announcement received backlash with criticism pertaining to the Israeli–Palestinian conflict. The band first released a statement defending their decision to perform in Israel, then eventually retracted their previous statement and canceled the concert dates. The cancellation was received with opposite backlash from the concert venue. The band previously performed at the venue in 2017.

At the 65th Annual Grammy Awards, Dragon New Warm Mountain I Believe in You was nominated for Best Alternative Music Album and "Certainty" was nominated for Best Alternative Music Performance.

In July 2023, the band released the single "Vampire Empire", which they had debuted in a live performance on The Late Show with Stephen Colbert earlier in February of the same year. In October 2023, "Vampire Empire" was released as a 7" single, with the song "Born for Loving You" as a B-side.

On July 11, 2024, the band announced Oleartchik's departure, a decision which according to the band was made for "interpersonal reasons with mutual respect in our hearts". On July 28, the band performed their first show in nearly a year at Project Pabst in Portland, where they debuted a five-piece lineup featuring a second percussionist, Jon Nellen, and a new bass guitarist, Justin Felton. The setlist included 14 songs, 10 of which were live debuts.

On August 27, 2024, it was announced that Big Thief served as producers and backing band for singer-songwriter Tucker Zimmerman's 15th studio album, Dance of Love. The band had previously appeared on stage with Zimmerman.

=== 2025–present: Double Infinity and Horsepower ===
On June 3, 2025, Big Thief announced their sixth studio album, Double Infinity, and released the first single "Incomprehensible". The album was released through 4AD on September 5, 2025. Recorded as a core three-piece for the first time, the band worked closely with eleven session musicians during the recording process.

Upon completing the album, the band added bass guitarist Joshua Crumbly to their live line-up. Buck Meek explained, "The tours are all going to be as a four-piece with him. The moment we started playing with him, he lifted us up. He’s melodic but holds so much earth, so much root, as a bassist. Incredible spirit." Lenker elaborated: "We gel. Nothing can replace Max. There’ll never be anything like that again, like what we were. Sorry for so much romantic-partnership metaphor: We took a year alone and then started dating. We went on tour with Jon and Justin, and we made this record with Joshua. It’s effortless. It’s like there’s DNA coded into these songs, and he just sees it." Buck Meek continued, "He grew up playing jazz with his father, a beautiful sax player, went to Juilliard, and toured the world. His private instructor is Ron Carter to this day."

On August 22, 2026, the band debuted their album Horsepower at a show at the Ryman Auditorium in Nashville. The album is a triple album and features Lucinda Williams, Gillian Welch, and Iris DeMent.

== Musical style ==
Pitchfork called Big Thief "rangy" folk rock. AllMusic called Big Thief's style "folk-tinged indie rock," making note of the "personal songwriting" of front woman Adrianne Lenker.

== Band members ==
Current members

- Adrianne Lenker – lead vocals, guitar (2015–present)
- Buck Meek – guitar, backing vocals (2015–present)
- James Krivchenia – drums, percussion, synthesizer, backing vocals (2015–present)

Current touring musicians

- Joshua Crumbly – bass guitar (2025–present)

Former members

- Jason Burger – drums (2015)
- Max Oleartchik – bass guitar, upright bass, backing vocals (2015–2024)

Former touring musicians

- Justin Felton – bass guitar (2024)
- Jon Nellen – drums (2024)
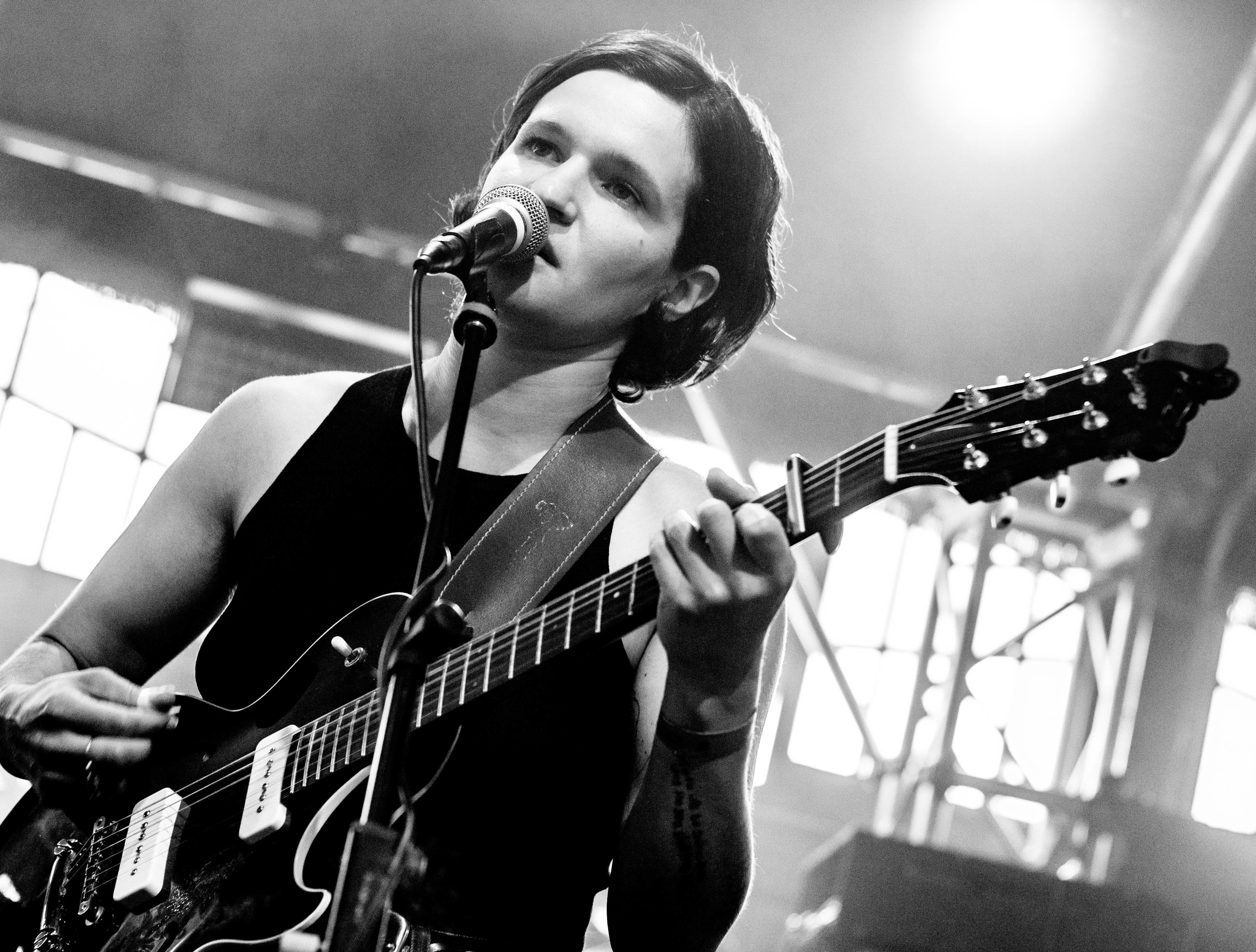
Adrianne Lenker

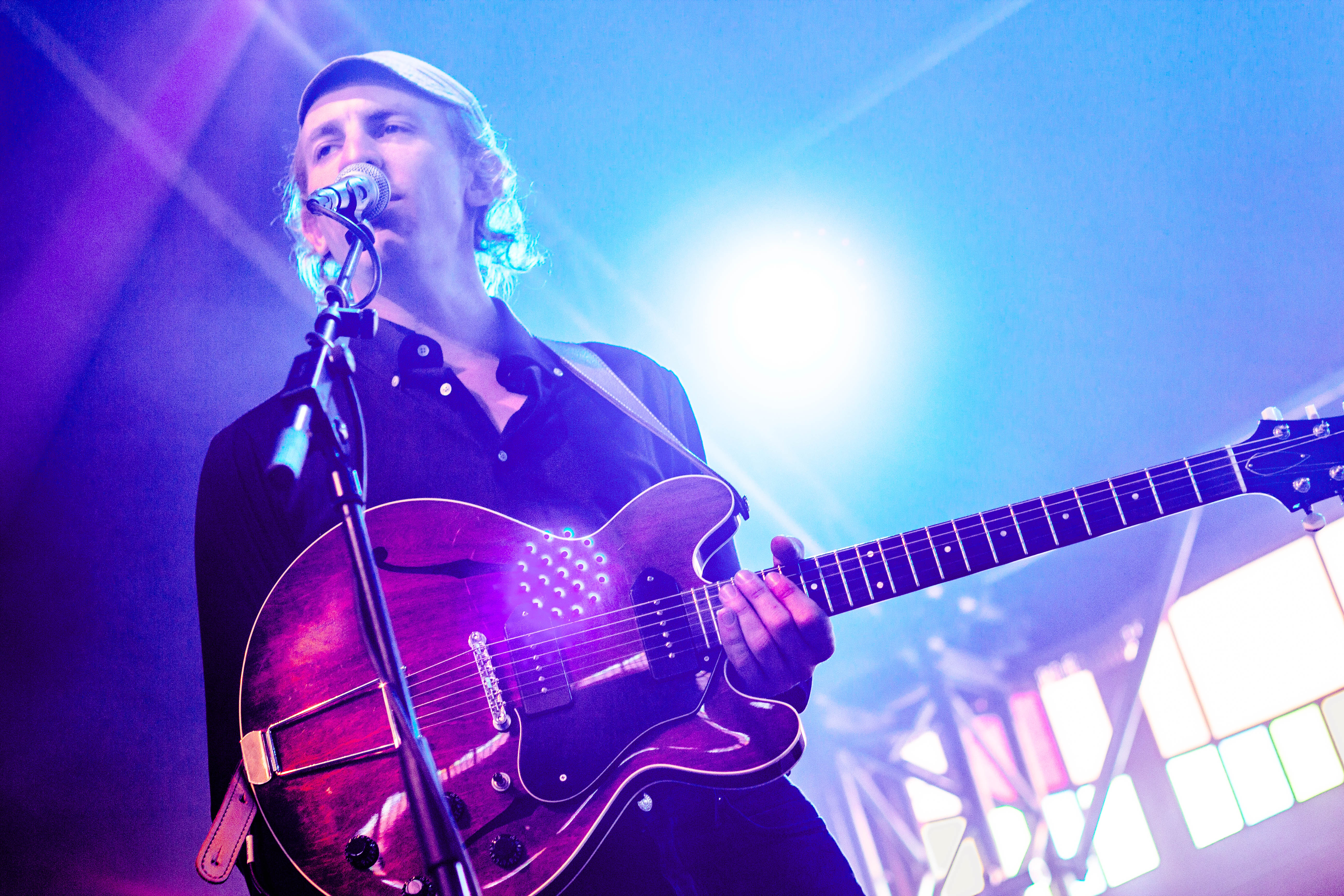
Buck Meek

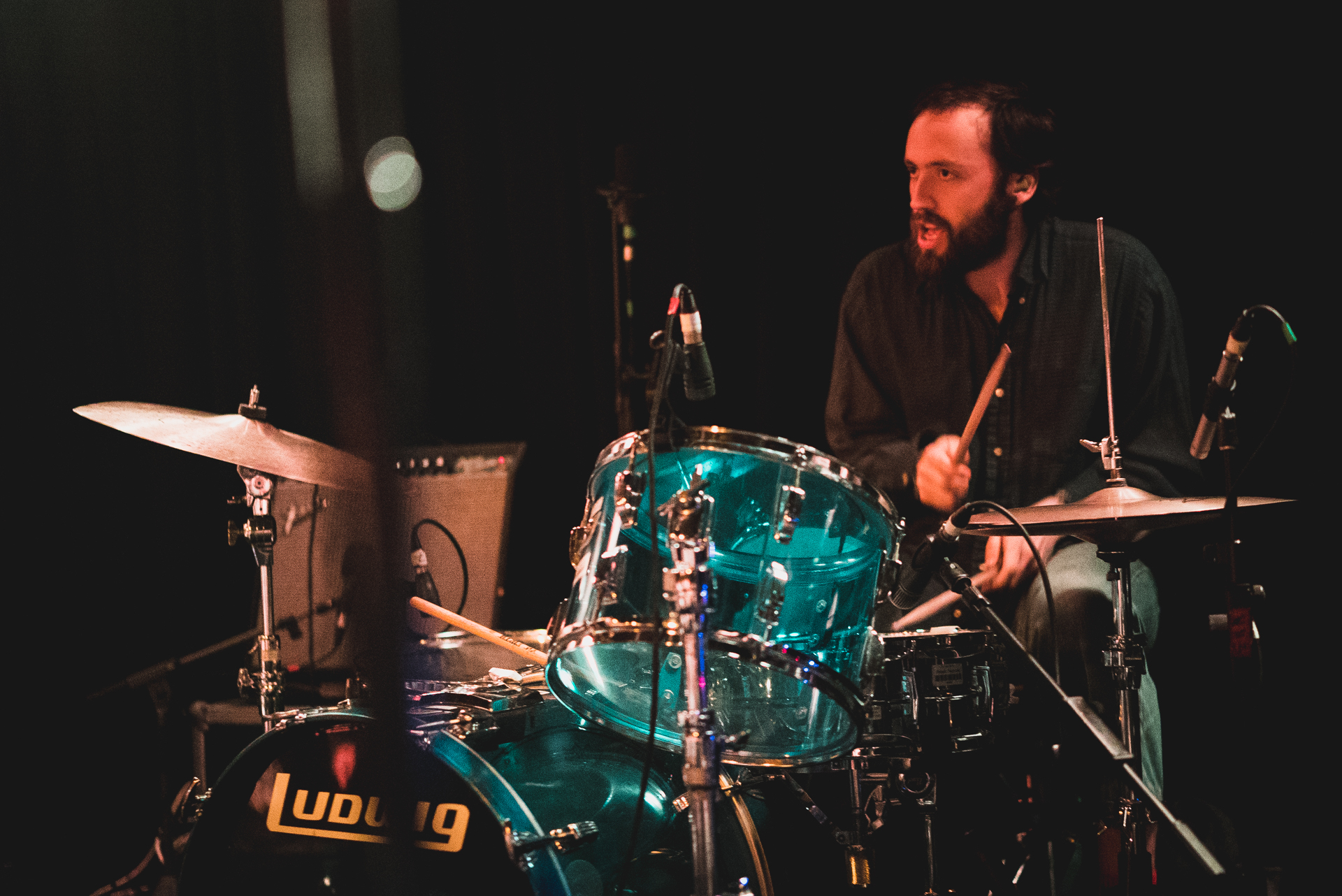
James Krivchenia

== Discography ==
=== Albums ===
Title	Details	Peak chart positions									
Title	Details	US	AUS	BEL (FL)	BEL (WA)	GER	IRE	NL	SCO	SWI	UK
Masterpiece	Released: May 27, 2016; Label: Saddle Creek; Formats: CD, digital download, LP	— (Note: Masterpiece did not enter the US Billboard 200, but peaked at number 10 on the US Heatseekers Albums Chart.)	—	—	—	—	—	—	—	—	— (Note: Masterpiece did not enter the UK Albums Chart, but peaked at number 21 on the UK Record Store Chart.)
Capacity	Released: June 9, 2017; Label: Saddle Creek; Formats: CD, digital download, LP	— (Note: Capacity did not enter the US Billboard 200, but peaked at number 9 on the US Heatseekers Albums Chart.)	—	—	—	—	—	—	74	—	— (Note: Capacity did not enter the UK Albums Chart, but peaked at number 100 on the UK Album Sales Chart.)
U.F.O.F.	Released: May 3, 2019; Label: 4AD; Formats: CD, digital download, LP	142	— (Note: U.F.O.F. did not enter the Australian ARIA Albums Chart but peaked at number 12 on the ARIA Hitseekers Chart.)	26	—	—	81	80	21	68	41
Two Hands	Released: October 11, 2019; Label: 4AD; Formats: CD, digital download, LP	113	99	20	119	—	78	59	8	—	34
Dragon New Warm Mountain I Believe in You	Released: February 11, 2022; Label: 4AD; Formats: CD, digital download, LP	31	19	6	60	24	22	6	5	35	15
Double Infinity	Released: September 5, 2025; Label: 4AD; Formats: CD, digital download, LP, cassette	121	19	15	72	61	27	18	5	96	21
"—" denotes album that did not chart or was not released

=== EPs ===
- Demos Vol. 1 (2020)
- Live at the Bunker Studio (2021)
- Passional Relations (2025)

=== Singles ===
Title	Year	Peak chart positions								Certifications	Album
Title	Year	US AAA	US Alt.	US Rock	BEL (FL) Tip	ICE	JPN Over.	NZ Hot	UK Sales	Certifications	Album
"Masterpiece"	2016	—	—	—	—	—	—	—	—		Masterpiece
"Mother"	2016	—	—	—	—	—	—	—	—		Non-album singles
"Dandelion"	2016	—	—	—	—	—	—	—	—		Non-album singles
"Mythological Beauty"	2017	—	—	—	—	—	—	—	— (Note: "Mythological Beauty" did not enter the UK Singles Chart, but peaked at number 46 on the UK Physical Singles Chart.)		Capacity
"Shark Smile"	2017	—	—	—	—	—	—	—	—		Capacity
"Mary"	2017	—	—	—	—	—	—	—	—		Capacity
"U.F.O.F."	2019	—	—	—	— (Note: "U.F.O.F." did not enter the Flanders Ultratop 50, but charted as an "extra tip" on the Ultratip chart.)	—	—	—	—		U.F.O.F.
"Cattails"	2019	—	—	—	— (Note: "Cattails" did not enter the Flanders Ultratop 50, but charted as an "extra tip" on the Ultratip chart.)	—	—	—	—		U.F.O.F.
"Century"	2019	—	—	—	— (Note: "Century" did not enter the Flanders Ultratop 50, but charted as an "extra tip" on the Ultratip chart.)	—	—	—	—		U.F.O.F.
"Not"	2019	—	—	—	30	—	—	—	—		Two Hands
"Forgotten Eyes"	2019	—	—	—	— (Note: "Forgotten Eyes" did not enter the Flanders Ultratop 50, but charted as an "extra tip" on the Ultratip chart.)	—	—	—	—		Two Hands
"Love in Mine"	2020	—	—	—	—	—	—	—	—		Non-album single
"Off You"	2021	—	—	—	—	—	—	—	—		Bills & Aches & Blues
"Little Things" / "Sparrow"	2021	—	—	—	—	33	—	—	—		Dragon New Warm Mountain I Believe in You
"Certainty"	2021	34	—	—	—	11	—	—	—		Dragon New Warm Mountain I Believe in You
"Change"	2021	—	—	—	—	—	—	—	—		Dragon New Warm Mountain I Believe in You
"Time Escaping"	2021	—	—	—	—	—	—	—	—		Dragon New Warm Mountain I Believe in You
"No Reason" / "Spud Infinity"	2021	—	—	—	—	4	—	—	—		Dragon New Warm Mountain I Believe in You
"Simulation Swarm"	2022	18	—	—	—	—	—	—	—		Dragon New Warm Mountain I Believe in You
"Vampire Empire"	2023	34	19	31	—	—	—	—	37	BPI: Silver; RMNZ: Gold	Non-album singles
"Born for Loving You"	2023	—	—	—	—	—	—	—	—		Non-album singles
"Incomprehensible"	2025	15	—	—	—	—	17	—	—		Double Infinity
"All Night All Day"	2025	—	—	—	—	—	—	—	—		Double Infinity
"Los Angeles" / "Grandmother"	2025	—	—	—	—	—	—	—	—		Double Infinity
"Words"	2025	35	—	—	—	—	—	26	—		Double Infinity
"—" denotes a single that did not chart or was not released in that territory.

=== Other certified songs ===
Title	Year	Certifications	Album
"Velvet Ring"	2016	BPI: Silver; RMNZ: Gold	Masterpiece

=== Music videos ===
- "Masterpiece" (2016)
- "Humans" (2016)
- "Mythological Beauty" (2017)
- "Red Moon" (2022)
- “Words” (2025)

== Accolades ==
Year	Association	Category	Nominated work	Result	Ref
2020	Grammy Awards	Best Alternative Album	U.F.O.F	Nominated	
2020	Libera Awards	Album of the Year	U.F.O.F	Won	
2020	Libera Awards	Best Alternative Rock Album	U.F.O.F	Nominated	
2021	Grammy Awards	Best Rock Performance	"Not"	Nominated	
2021	Grammy Awards	Best Rock Song	"Not"	Nominated	
2023	Grammy Awards	Best Alternative Album	Dragon New Warm Mountain I Believe in You	Nominated	
2023	Grammy Awards	Best Alternative Music Performance	"Certainty"	Nominated	
