= Wilder Maker =

American indie rock band

- Origin: Brooklyn, New York
- Genres: Indie rock; cowboy pop; indie pop
- Years active: 2014-present
- Labels: Western Vinyl; Saddle Creek Records; Northern Spy Records
- Members: Gabriel Birnbaum; Adam Brisbin; Nick Jost; Sean Mullins; Katie Von Schleicher

Wilder Maker is an American indie rock band from Brooklyn, New York, formed in 2014. The band consists of Gabriel Birnbaum (guitar and vocals), Katie Von Schleicher (keyboards, guitar, vocals), Nick Jost (bass), Sean Mullins (drums) and Adam Brisbin (guitar). They have released three albums and several EPs.

== History ==
Wilder Maker began releasing music in 2014 with a self-released EP entitled Everyday Crimes Against Objects of Desire. The EP was premiered by Stereogum. In 2017, Wilder Maker signed with Saddle Creek and released the single "New Streets." The release brought wider attention to the band and Spin Magazine called the single "unambiguously catchy, offering the band’s idiosyncratic perspective on the more silken side of ’70s radio rock." "Only Child," the b-side to "New Streets" was recorded by Bryan Pugh at Rubber Tracks in Brooklyn, and features the guitar work of Will Graefe of Okkervil River.

In 2018, Wilder Maker released their first album entitled Zion. Following the release of Zion, Wilder Maker toured the United States, performing in more than 20 cities across the country. In 2019, Wilder Maker performed at Underwater Sunshine Festival in New York City.

== Discography ==
=== Albums ===
- The Streets Like Beds Still Warm (2025)
- Male Models (2022) - Western Vinyl
- Zion (2018) - Northern Spy

=== Singles and EPs ===
- "Rose Room" / "Love So Well" (2019) - Northern Spy Records
- "Infinite Shift" / "Black Wood Shine" (2019) - Northern Spy Records
- "New Streets" (2017) - Saddle Creek
- Everyday Crimes Against Objects of Desire Vol. III (2015) - Self-released
- Everyday Crimes Against Objects of Desire Vol. II (2015) - Self-released
- Everyday Crimes Against Objects of Desire Vol. I (2014) - Self-released
