= Tiny Desk Concerts =

NPR video concerts

Text logo

Tiny Desk Concerts is a program at NPR Music of live performances, generally stripped-down, by musicians of different genres, located in Washington, D.C.

== History ==
The first Tiny Desk Concert came about in 2008 after Bob Boilen and NPR Music editor Stephen Thompson left South by Southwest frustrated because they couldn't hear the music over the crowd noise. Thompson joked that the musician and folk singer Laura Gibson should just perform at Boilen's desk. A month later Boilen arranged for her to do just that, making an impromptu recording and posting it online. The name is taken from Boilen's 1970s psychedelic dance band called Tiny Desk Unit.

During its early years, the series drew some criticism for the narrow range of musical genres it included—described as focused on "hipster-infused indie rock" by Zachary Crockett at Vox—to the exclusion of genres like country and hip-hop. However, the series' musical focus has broadened in scope over time.

During the COVID-19 pandemic, NPR Music enlisted artists to instead record their own virtual performances under the re-branded title Tiny Desk (Home) Concerts. The 2022 Tiny Desk Concert winner, Alisa Amador, was the first performance back at the desk with an audience since the pandemic started.

As of August 2024, the series included more than 1,100 concerts and has an average of 45 million views a month on YouTube.

== Adaptations ==
South Korea–based TV agency Something Special worked alongside both NPR and LG Uplus to launch Tiny Desk Korea, which served as the first time Tiny Desk Concerts was adapted as a TV show outside North America, with up to 52 episodes aired weekly. The TV show was premiered on LG U+ platforms in August 2023. The series is produced at LG Uplus's headquarters in the Yongsan District of Seoul.

In March 2024, a similar licensing agreement was struck with NHK to launch Tiny Desk Concerts Japan with Fujii Kaze as the first performer in the series. The show premiered on NHK General TV in Japan on March 16, 2024, subsequently premiering on its global sister channel NHK World-Japan on March 29. The series became a regularly scheduled program on September 30, starting with B'z vocalist Koshi Inaba.

In September 2025, Anonymous Content Brazil announced the creation of Tiny Desk Brasil. The series premiered on YouTube in October 7, with João Gomes as its first performer.

== Tiny Desk Contest ==
In December 2014, NPR announced it would host its first contest, inviting musicians to submit a video of one of their songs. A jury of musicians and NPR staff choose a winner to play a Tiny Desk Concert. The contest has continued annually, each year drawing more than 6000 submissions. Jurors have included Trey Anastasio of Phish, Dan Auerbach of the Black Keys, and Jess Wolfe of Lucius.

Singer Yasmin Williams, a two-time Contest "loser", was invited back to perform on the flagship Tiny Desk Concerts series in February 2025. Williams credited her Contest and subsequent NPR appearances with helping to launch her career.

Tiny Desk Contest winners have included:

- Fantastic Negrito (2015)
- Gaelynn Lea (2016)
- Tank and the Bangas (2017)
- Naia Izumi (2018)
- Quinn Christopherson (2019)
- Linda Diaz (2020)
- Neffy (2021)
- Alisa Amador (2022)
- Little Moon (2023)
- The Philharmonik (2024)
- Ruby Ibarra (2025)
- Cure For Paranoia (2026)

== Tiny Desk Radio ==
On April 17, 2025, NPR launched Tiny Desk Radio, a weekly hour-long show on member stations hosted by Bobby Carter and Anamaria Sayre. The show itself features greatest Tiny Desk performances and stories of artists asked to reimagine their music.

== Concerts by year ==
=== 2008 ===
Date	Artists	NPR article
April 22, 2008	Laura Gibson	source
June 5, 2008	Vic Chesnutt	source
June 25, 2008	Sam Phillips	source
July 10, 2008	Sera Cahoone	source
September 4, 2008	Thao Nguyen	source
October 8, 2008	Kurt Wagner of Lambchop	source
October 20, 2008	Dr. Dog	source
November 7, 2008	Jim White	source
November 14, 2008	Shearwater	source
December 30, 2008	David Dondero	source

=== 2009 ===
Date	Artists	NPR article
January 7, 2009	Wovenhand	source
January 27, 2009	Super XX Man	source
March 2, 2009	Tom Jones	source
May 8, 2009	Horse Feathers	source
May 29, 2009	Benjy Ferree	source
June 8, 2009	Great Lake Swimmers	source
June 15, 2009	Jason Vieaux	source
June 22, 2009	The Avett Brothers	source
June 29, 2009	Maria Taylor	source
July 6, 2009	Julie Doiron	source
July 13, 2009	Bill Callahan	source
July 20, 2009	Dave Douglas Brass Ecstasy	source
July 27, 2009	Sarah Siskind	source
August 10, 2009	The Swell Season	source
August 24, 2009	Dark Meat	source
September 14, 2009	The Tallest Man on Earth	source
September 21, 2009	Telekinesis	source
September 28, 2009	Raphael Saadiq	source
October 4, 2009	John Vanderslice	source
October 10, 2009	Rodrigo y Gabriela	source
October 19, 2009	Ralph Stanley	source
October 26, 2009	Edward Sharpe and the Magnetic Zeros	source
November 2, 2009	Sondre Lerche	source
November 9, 2009	K'naan	source
November 16, 2009	Bowerbirds	source
November 23, 2009	Zee Avi	source
November 30, 2009	Andrew W.K.	source
December 7, 2009	Lightning Dust	source
December 16, 2009	Fanfarlo	source
December 21, 2009	Australian Chamber Orchestra	source

=== 2010 ===
Date	Artists	NPR article
January 3, 2010	The Mountain Goats	source
January 10, 2010	Adam Arcuragi	source
January 20, 2010	The Low Anthem	source
January 26, 2010	Brooklyn Rider	source
February 1, 2010	Dave Rawlings Machine with Gillian Welch	source
February 8, 2010	Edmar Castañeda	source
February 15, 2010	Abaji	source
February 22, 2010	Alec Ounsworth	source
March 1, 2010	Laura Veirs	source
March 8, 2010	Omara Portuondo	source
March 15, 2010	The Antlers	source
March 29, 2010	Wye Oak	source
April 2, 2010	Jakob Dylan	source
April 11, 2010	Regina Carter	source
April 19, 2010	David Russell	source
April 26, 2010	Lionel Loueke	source
May 3, 2010	Fredrik	source
May 4, 2010	Moby and Kelli Scarr	source
May 11, 2010	Tarrus Riley	source
May 18, 2010	Phoenix	source
May 21, 2010	Bettye LaVette	source
June 1, 2010	Roger McGuinn, The Rock Bottom Remainders	source
June 4, 2010	Zuill Bailey	source
June 21, 2010	The Mynabirds	source
June 22, 2010	"Weird Al" Yankovic	source
June 28, 2010	Gogol Bordello	source
July 5, 2010	Los Campesinos!	source
July 12, 2010	Jimmy Cliff	source
July 19, 2010	Villagers	source
July 26, 2010	Béla Fleck, Edgar Meyer and Zakir Hussain	source
August 2, 2010	The Holmes Brothers	source
August 9, 2010	Mavis Staples	source
August 15, 2010	Frazey Ford	source
August 17, 2010	Peter Wolf Crier	source
August 23, 2010	Lawrence Arabia	source
August 25, 2010	Brian Courtney Wilson	source
August 30, 2010	Ana Tijoux	source
September 7, 2010	The Nels Cline Singers	source
September 13, 2010	Seu Jorge	source
September 15, 2010	Alisa Weilerstein	source
September 20, 2010	Eef Barzelay of Clem Snide	source
September 23, 2010	Lost in the Trees	source
September 28, 2010	Chuck Brown	source
October 6, 2010	Tom Tom Club	source
October 10, 2010	Lower Dens	source
October 17, 2010	Hey Marseilles	source
October 25, 2010	Stile Antico	source
November 1, 2010	Nick Lowe	source
November 2, 2010	Rana Santacruz	source
November 8, 2010	Black Dub	source
November 10, 2010	Los Lobos	source
November 14, 2010	Sharon Van Etten	source
November 17, 2010	The Ghost of a Saber Tooth Tiger	source
November 22, 2010	Ólöf Arnalds	source
November 29, 2010	Khaira Arby	source
December 6, 2010	Buke and Gase	source
December 8, 2010	Yolanda Kondonassis	source
December 13, 2010	The Red River	source
December 15, 2010	The Heligoats	source
December 20, 2010	Matt Wilson's Christmas Tree-O	source
December 26, 2010	Luísa Maita	source
December 29, 2010	Gyptian	source

=== 2011 ===
Date	Artists	NPR article
January 3, 2011	Abigail Washburn	source
January 9, 2011	David Wax Museum	source
January 17, 2011	Ballaké Sissoko and Vincent Ségal	source
January 21, 2011	Iron & Wine	source
January 24, 2011	Basia Bulat	source
February 1, 2011	Richard Thompson	source
February 3, 2011	Stars	source
February 7, 2011	Ivan & Alyosha	source
February 12, 2011	Esperanza Spalding	source
February 16, 2011	Turtle Island Quartet	source
February 17, 2011	Adele	source
February 21, 2011	Local Natives	source
February 28, 2011	Damien Jurado	source
March 7, 2011	Steve Riley and the Mamou Playboys	source
March 14, 2011	Lizz Wright	source
April 4, 2011	Nellie McKay	source
April 6, 2011	Sierra Leone's Refugee All Stars	source
April 11, 2011	Josh Ritter	source
April 13, 2011	Otis Taylor	source
April 18, 2011	Mount Kimbie	source
April 20, 2011	Pokey LaFarge	source
April 25, 2011	Steve Earle	source
April 27, 2011	Wu Man	source
May 2, 2011	Booker T. Jones	source
May 9, 2011	Julieta Venegas	source
May 11, 2011	Neil Innes	source
May 16, 2011	Future Islands	source
May 22, 2011	Low	source
May 23, 2011	Jackie Evancho	source
June 6, 2011	The Kopecky Family Band	source
June 8, 2011	The Black Angels	source
June 13, 2011	Chris Thile and Michael Daves	source
June 15, 2011	Charlie Siem	source
June 20, 2011	The Decemberists	source
June 22, 2011	Yacht	source
June 27, 2011	The Civil Wars	source
June 30, 2011	Milos	source
July 5, 2011	The Blind Boys of Alabama	source
July 7, 2011	Julian Lage Trio	source
July 11, 2011	Ben Sollee	source
July 18, 2011	Joe Boyd and Robyn Hitchcock	source
July 21, 2011	Y La Bamba	source
July 24, 2011	Givers	source
July 28, 2011	They Might Be Giants	source
August 3, 2011	Amanda Shires	source
August 10, 2011	Noah and the Whale	source
August 12, 2011	Paul Jacobs	source
August 15, 2011	Gaby Moreno	source
August 18, 2011	Other Lives	source
August 25, 2011	James Vincent McMorrow	source
August 29, 2011	Callmecat	source
September 1, 2011	Phosphorescent	source
September 4, 2011	King Creosote and Jon Hopkins	source
September 9, 2011	Foster the People	source
September 12, 2011	Diego Garcia	source
September 16, 2011	Sean Rowe	source
September 19, 2011	Jeremy Messersmith	source
September 21, 2011	Beirut	source
September 26, 2011	Jenny Lin	source
September 28, 2011	The Klezmatics	source
September 29, 2011	Trombone Shorty	source
October 5, 2011	Mates of State	source
October 6, 2011	Fountains of Wayne	source
October 8, 2011	JEFF the Brotherhood	source
October 11, 2011	Grouplove	source
October 14, 2011	Chris Bathgate	source
October 17, 2011	Wilco	source
October 21, 2011	Hilary Hahn	source
October 24, 2011	Ben Williams and Sound Effect (Gilad Hekselman, John Davis, Christian Sands and Marcus Strickland)	source
October 29, 2011	Lisa Hannigan	source
November 3, 2011	Juanes	source
November 7, 2011	Jens Lekman	source
November 10, 2011	Markéta Irglová	source
November 17, 2011	Yo-Yo Ma, Edgar Meyer, Chris Thile and Stuart Duncan	source
November 21, 2011	Joe Henry	source
November 23, 2011	Hospital Ships	source
November 26, 2011	Gabriel Kahane	source
December 1, 2011	Tune-Yards	source
December 12, 2011	I Wayne	source
December 16, 2011	Gem Club	source
December 20, 2011	The Music Tapes	source
December 27, 2011	María Volonté	source

=== 2012 ===
Date	Artists	NPR article
January 5, 2012	Tinariwen	source
January 9, 2012	Le Butcherettes	source
January 23, 2012	Screaming Females	source
January 23, 2012	Jake Schepps' Expedition Quartet	source
January 23, 2012	Glenn Jones	source
January 30, 2012	Girl in a Coma	source
February 1, 2012	Anna Calvi	source
February 3, 2012	Bill Frisell	source
February 6, 2012	The Creole Choir of Cuba	source
February 9, 2012	Craig Finn	source
February 14, 2012	Red Baraat	source
February 16, 2012	Joan Soriano	source
February 20, 2012	Joyce El-Khoury and Brian Jagde	source
February 23, 2012	The Cranberries	source
February 27, 2012	Milagres	source
March 1, 2012	Pistolera	source
March 5, 2012	Laura Gibson	source
March 8, 2012	Rudresh Mahanthappa	source
March 12, 2012	Real Estate	source
March 24, 2012	Kayhan Kalhor	source
March 28, 2012	First Aid Kit	source
April 2, 2012	So Percussion	source
April 5, 2012	Kathleen Edwards	source
April 10, 2012	Caveman	source
April 12, 2012	Novalima	source
April 16, 2012	Soweto Gospel Choir	source
April 23, 2012	Jolie Holland	source
April 26, 2012	Cowboy Junkies	source
April 30, 2012	Hospitality	source
May 3, 2012	Nathan Salsburg	source
May 7, 2012	Endangered Blood	source
May 10, 2012	Kishi Bashi	source
May 14, 2012	Pedro Soler and Gaspar Claus	source
May 17, 2012	Arborea	source
May 21, 2012	Yann Tiersen	source
May 26, 2012	Canadian Brass	source
May 31, 2012	Patrick Watson	source
June 4, 2012	Kelly Hogan	source
June 7, 2012	Allison Miller's Boom Tic Boom	source
June 11, 2012	Daniel Johnston	source
June 17, 2012	Glen Hansard	source
June 21, 2012	Mariachi El Bronx	source
June 25, 2012	Reggie Watts	source
July 2, 2012	Exitmusic	source
July 9, 2012	Brandi Carlile	source
July 12, 2012	Laura Marling	source
July 15, 2012	Souad Massi	source
July 16, 2012	The Milk Carton Kids	source
July 22, 2012	Janet Feder	source
July 29, 2012	The Walkmen	source
August 6, 2012	Beth Orton	source
August 12, 2012	The Zombies	source
August 20, 2012	Rufus Wainwright	source
August 27, 2012	Renaud Garcia-Fons	source
September 10, 2012	Avi Avital	source
September 17, 2012	Amanda Palmer and the Grand Theft Orchestra	source
September 24, 2012	Yva Las Vegass	source
October 1, 2012	Kat Edmonson	source
October 4, 2012	Antibalas	source
October 8, 2012	Spirit Family Reunion	source
October 11, 2012	Dirty Three	source
October 22, 2012	Robert Cray Band	source
October 25, 2012	Lord Huron	source
October 29, 2012	Passion Pit	source
November 5, 2012	Jason Lytle	source
November 12, 2012	Flaco Jiménez	source
November 19, 2012	Ben Gibbard	source
November 26, 2012	Martha Wainwright	source
November 29, 2012	Taken by Trees	source
December 3, 2012	Macklemore & Ryan Lewis	source
December 6, 2012	Anaïs Mitchell	source
December 9, 2012	Daniel Bachman	source
December 10, 2012	Lyle Lovett	source
December 17, 2012	Alt-J	source
December 21, 2012	The Polyphonic Spree	source
December 31, 2012	Miguel	source

=== 2013 ===
Date	Artists	NPR article
January 7, 2013	Lucius	source
January 14, 2013	Black Prairie	source
January 28, 2013	Of Montreal	source
February 4, 2013	Cantus	source
February 11, 2013	The xx	source
February 18, 2013	Night Beds	source
February 25, 2013	Mary Halvorson Quintet	source
March 4, 2013	The Lone Bellow	source
March 14, 2013	Martin Hayes and Dennis Cahill	source
April 8, 2013	Efterklang	source
April 15, 2013	Yo La Tengo	source
April 22, 2013	Omar Sosa and Paolo Fresu	source
April 29, 2013	Father Figures	source
May 6, 2013	Nicola Benedetti	source
May 13, 2013	Buddy Miller and Jim Lauderdale	source
May 20, 2013	Mohammad-Reza Shajarian	source
June 3, 2013	OK Go	source
June 10, 2013	The National	source
June 15, 2013	NO BS! Brass Band	source
June 17, 2013	Billy Bragg	source
June 24, 2013	Patty Griffin	source
June 29, 2013	Maya Beiser	source
July 1, 2013	Laura Mvula	source
July 6, 2013	Cheick Hamala Diabaté	source
July 8, 2013	Skinny Lister	source
July 13, 2013	Frank Turner	source
July 15, 2013	Alice Russell	source
July 20, 2013	Cheyenne Marie Mize	source
July 22, 2013	Guards	source
July 27, 2013	Time for Three	source
July 29, 2013	Dana Falconberry	source
August 3, 2013	Keaton Henson	source
August 10, 2013	Jim Guthrie	source
August 12, 2013	Alpine	source
August 17, 2013	Mother Falcon	source
August 19, 2013	The Front Bottoms	source
August 26, 2013	Buika	source
August 31, 2013	Steve Gunn	source
September 4, 2013	Baths	source
September 7, 2013	Bombino	source
September 10, 2013	The 1975 (Note: Represented by lead singer Matthew Healy of the band (who also played in guitar) who was the only member of the band who performed in this performance.)	source
September 14, 2013	Arturo O'Farrill	source
September 16, 2013	Shovels & Rope	source
September 21, 2013	The Cristina Pato Trio	source
September 28, 2013	Hem	source
September 30, 2013	Oliver "Tuku" Mtukudzi	source
October 5, 2013	Lawrence Brownlee	source
October 7, 2013	Superchunk	source
October 12, 2013	Valerie June	source
October 15, 2013	Okkervil River	source
October 19, 2013	Matt Ulery's Loom	source
October 21, 2013	Daughter	source
October 26, 2013	Typhoon	source
October 28, 2013	San Fermin	source
October 31, 2013	Neko Case	source
November 3, 2013	Ashley Monroe	source
November 9, 2013	Gary Burton	source
November 12, 2013	Debashish Bhattacharya	source
November 16, 2013	John Legend	source
November 23, 2013	Waxahatchee	source
November 25, 2013	Kronos Quartet	source
December 2, 2013	The Dismemberment Plan	source
December 7, 2013	Sarah Jarosz	source
December 9, 2013	Dessa	source
December 14, 2013	Christine Salem	source
December 16, 2013	La Santa Cecilia	source
December 21, 2013	Preservation Hall Jazz Band	source

=== 2014 ===
Date	Artists	NPR article
January 4, 2014	Vanessa Vo	source
January 7, 2014	Lily & Madeleine	source
January 13, 2014	Afro Blue	source
January 20, 2014	Robert Glasper Experiment	source
January 27, 2014	Angel Olsen	source
February 3, 2014	Pixies	source
February 8, 2014	Fanfare Ciocărlia	source
February 10, 2014	Suzanne Vega	source
February 18, 2014	Cate Le Bon	source
February 22, 2014	Sofia Rei	source
February 24, 2014	Brass Bed	source
March 2, 2014	Asaf Avidan	source
March 6, 2014	Lowland Hum	source
March 10, 2014	Jake Bugg	source
March 17, 2014	Diane Cluck	source
March 24, 2014	Joseph Calleja	source
March 31, 2014	The Haden Triplets	source
April 7, 2014	The Both	source
April 12, 2014	Tom Brosseau	source
April 14, 2014	Courtney Barnett	source
April 19, 2014	Usman Riaz	source
April 21, 2014	Federico Aubele	source
April 26, 2014	Quilt	source
April 28, 2014	Johnnyswim	source
May 3, 2014	Cian Nugent	source
May 5, 2014	Public Service Broadcasting	source
May 10, 2014	Timber Timbre	source
May 12, 2014	Chvrches	source
May 17, 2014	Iestyn Davies	source
May 20, 2014	Ages and Ages	source
May 24, 2014	Yasmine Hamdan	source
May 27, 2014	Hozier	source
May 31, 2014	Juana Molina	source
June 2, 2014	Simone Dinnerstein	source
June 7, 2014	Marian McLaughlin	source
June 14, 2014	Eliot Fisk and Paco Peña	source
June 16, 2014	Rodney Crowell	source
June 21, 2014	Mali Music	source
June 23, 2014	Conor Oberst	source
June 28, 2014	Tracy Silverman	source
July 1, 2014	Lydia Loveless	source
July 5, 2014	The Foreign Exchange	source
July 7, 2014	Moon Hooch	source
July 13, 2014	John Grant	source
July 14, 2014	Holly Williams	source
July 19, 2014	Marisa Anderson	source
July 21, 2014	Hamilton Leithauser	source
July 25, 2014	Highasakite	source
July 29, 2014	Saintseneca	source
August 2, 2014	Quetzal	source
August 4, 2014	The Family Crest	source
August 9, 2014	Irene Diaz	source
August 11, 2014	Bob Mould	source
August 16, 2014	Ernest Ranglin	source
August 18, 2014	Pacifica Quartet	source
August 23, 2014	Rodrigo Amarante	source
August 26, 2014	Nickel Creek	source
August 30, 2014	Sturgill Simpson	source
September 3, 2014	Trampled by Turtles	source
September 6, 2014	Jessica Lea Mayfield	source
September 8, 2014	Justin Townes Earle	source
September 15, 2014	Luluc	source
September 22, 2014	Tweedy	source
September 29, 2014	Bio Ritmo	source
October 4, 2014	Ryan Keberle & Catharsis	source
October 6, 2014	Jackson Browne	source
October 11, 2014	Raquel Sofía	source
October 14, 2014	The Bots	source
October 18, 2014	Ásgeir	source
October 20, 2014	Anthony D'Amato	source
October 25, 2014	Danish String Quartet	source
October 29, 2014	T-Pain	source
October 30, 2014	Banks	source
October 31, 2014	The Sun Ra Arkestra	source
November 8, 2014	Making Movies	source
November 10, 2014	Roomful of Teeth	source
November 15, 2014	Davíd Garza	source
November 22, 2014	J Mascis	source
November 24, 2014	Pat Benatar and Neil Giraldo	source
December 1, 2014	Sam Amidon and Bill Frisell	source
December 4, 2014	Dublin Guitar Quartet	source
December 6, 2014	St. Paul and The Broken Bones	source
December 9, 2014	Yusuf / Cat Stevens	source
December 20, 2014	Lucinda Williams	source

=== 2015 ===
Date	Artists	NPR article
January 5, 2015	Trey Anastasio	source
January 13, 2015	Daniel Lanois	source
January 20, 2015	Rubblebucket	source
January 27, 2015	Bobby Bare Jr.	source
February 3, 2015	John Reilly & Friends (Note: Featuring Tom Brosseau, Becky Stark, Andru Bemis, and Sebastian Steinberg.)	source
February 10, 2015	Mucca Pazza	source
February 17, 2015	Until the Ribbon Breaks	source
February 23, 2015	Zola Jesus	source
February 25, 2015	Dan Deacon	source
March 2, 2015	Phox	source
March 7, 2015	Aurelio	source
March 9, 2015	Fantastic Negrito	source
March 14, 2015	Matt Haimovitz and Christopher O'Riley	source
March 16, 2015	Punch Brothers	source
March 28, 2015	Anonymous 4 with Bruce Molsky	source
March 30, 2015	Sylvan Esso	source
April 6, 2015	Death Cab for Cutie	source
April 10, 2015	Beach Slang	source
April 13, 2015	Chadwick Stokes	source
April 17, 2015	Rosa Díaz	source
April 20, 2015	Jessie Ware	source
April 25, 2015	DakhaBrakha	source
April 29, 2015	José González	source
May 1, 2015	Diego el Cigala	source
May 4, 2015	Vijay Iyer Trio	source
May 8, 2015	Eskmo	source
May 11, 2015	Bellows	source
May 15, 2015	Camané	source
May 19, 2015	Young Fathers	source
May 22, 2015	Jason Vieaux and Yolanda Kondonassis	source
May 26, 2015	Madisen Ward and the Mama Bear	source
May 29, 2015	Frank Fairfield	source
June 1, 2015	Genevieve	source
June 8, 2015	Anna & Elizabeth	source
June 15, 2015	The Prettiots	source
June 19, 2015	Strand of Oaks	source
June 22, 2015	Hop Along	source
June 26, 2015	Oddisee	source
June 30, 2015	And the Kids	source
July 6, 2015	Christopher Paul Stelling	source
July 10, 2015	Girlpool	source
July 17, 2015	Songhoy Blues	source
July 21, 2015	Kae Tempest	source
July 28, 2015	Paul Weller	source
July 31, 2015	Shamir	source
August 3, 2015	Soak	source
August 5, 2015	Terence Blanchard feat. the E-Collective	source
August 10, 2015	Torres	source
August 14, 2015	Restorations	source
August 17, 2015	Kacey Musgraves	source
August 21, 2015	Son Lux	source
August 24, 2015	Caroline Rose	source
August 28, 2015	Eskimeaux	source
August 31, 2015	Mitski	source
September 4, 2015	Happyness	source
September 8, 2015	Leon Bridges	source
September 11, 2015	Sam Lee	source
September 18, 2015	Watkins Family Hour	source
September 22, 2015	Gina Chavez	source
September 25, 2015	Joan Shelley	source
September 29, 2015	The Internet	source
October 2, 2015	Lianne La Havas	source
October 5, 2015	Deqn Sue	source
October 9, 2015	Christian Scott aTunde Adjuah	source
October 13, 2015	Andra Day	source
October 16, 2015	Oh Pep!	source
October 19, 2015	Paolo Angeli	source
October 23, 2015	Beauty Pill	source
October 27, 2015	The Suffers	source
November 2, 2015	Diane Coffee	source
November 5, 2015	Chris Stapleton	source
November 6, 2015	My Bubba	source
November 9, 2015	Aurora	source
November 13, 2015	Rahim AlHaj	source
November 17, 2015	Nathaniel Rateliff & the Night Sweats	source
November 20, 2015	The Wild Reeds	source
November 23, 2015	Youth Lagoon	source
November 30, 2015	Teddy Abrams	source
December 4, 2015	Protomartyr	source
December 8, 2015	The Oh Hellos	source
December 10, 2015	Sharon Jones & the Dap-Kings	source
December 11, 2015	Land Lines	source
December 14, 2015	Shakey Graves	source
December 18, 2015	Son Little	source
December 21, 2015	Sharon Jones & the Dap-Kings	source

=== 2016 ===
Date	Artists	NPR article
January 5, 2016	Rapsody	source
January 8, 2016	Mariachi Flor de Toloache	source
January 12, 2016	Natalie Merchant	source
January 14, 2016	Benny Sings	source
January 19, 2016	River Whyless	source
January 22, 2016	Wolf Alice	source
January 25, 2016	The Arcs	source
January 29, 2016	EL VY	source
February 8, 2016	Car Seat Headrest	source
February 10, 2016	Chelsea Wolfe	source
February 16, 2016	Ben Folds	source
February 22, 2016	Wilco	source
February 24, 2016	Brushy One String	source
February 25, 2016	Lake Street Dive	source
March 2, 2016	Monsieur Periné	source
March 4, 2016	Julien Baker	source
March 8, 2016	Graham Nash	source
March 10, 2016	Gaelynn Lea	source
March 17, 2016	Peter Frampton	source
March 24, 2016	Anthony Hamilton	source
March 24, 2016	Tedeschi Trucks Band	source
March 30, 2016	Pwr Bttm	source
March 30, 2016	Ane Brun	source
April 6, 2016	Mothers	source
April 8, 2016	Palehound	source
April 11, 2016	Seratones	source
April 15, 2016	Benjamin Clementine	source
April 20, 2016	Sister Sparrow & the Dirty Birds	source
April 20, 2016	Julia Holter	source
April 28, 2016	Florist	source
April 29, 2016	Eighth Blackbird	source
May 3, 2016	Monika	source
May 5, 2016	Lara St. John	source
May 12, 2016	Daymé Arocena	source
May 13, 2016	Steve Kimock	source
May 17, 2016	Andy Shauf	source
May 20, 2016	Robert Ellis	source
May 24, 2016	Carrie Rodriguez	source
May 25, 2016	Andrew Bird	source
June 1, 2016	Barry Douglas	source
June 2, 2016	Sam Beam and Jesca Hoop	source
June 9, 2016	Weaves	source
June 13, 2016	Chick Corea and Gary Burton	source
June 16, 2016	Brandy Clark	source
June 16, 2016	Alessio Bax	source
June 22, 2016	Mashrou' Leila	source
June 28, 2016	Charles Lloyd and Jason Moran	source
June 29, 2016	Adia Victoria	source
June 30, 2016	Los Hacheros	source
July 6, 2016	Jane Bunnett	source
July 7, 2016	Valley Queen	source
July 13, 2016	Chris Forsyth & the Solar Motel Band	source
July 18, 2016	Gregory Porter	source
July 21, 2016	John Congleton and the Nighty Nite	source
July 25, 2016	Xenia Rubinos	source
July 27, 2016	René Marie	source
July 27, 2016	Rachel Barton Pine	source
July 27, 2016	Kevin Morby	source
July 27, 2016	Lucy Dacus	source
August 5, 2016	The Jayhawks	source
August 12, 2016	Anderson .Paak and the Free Nationals	source
August 18, 2016	Margaret Glaspy	source
August 18, 2016	Eddie Palmieri	source
August 25, 2016	Nina Diaz	source
August 29, 2016	Big Thief	source
September 6, 2016	William Bell	source
September 8, 2016	The Secret Sisters	source
September 15, 2016	Saul Williams	source
September 19, 2016	Corinne Bailey Rae	source
September 23, 2016	Blue Man Group	source
September 28, 2016	Joshua Bell and Jeremy Denk	source
October 3, 2016	Common	source
October 7, 2016	Haley Bonar	source
October 9, 2016	Blind Pilot	source
October 11, 2016	RDGLDGRN	source
October 13, 2016	Billy Bragg and Joe Henry	source
October 20, 2016	Drive-By Truckers	source
October 25, 2016	John Paul White	source
October 25, 2016	Joseph	source
November 1, 2016	The Westerlies	source
November 3, 2016	Ta-ku and Wafia	source
November 8, 2016	Attacca Quartet	source
November 8, 2016	Adam Torres	source
November 16, 2016	Tegan and Sara	source
November 22, 2016	Pinegrove	source
November 22, 2016	Margo Price	source
December 2, 2016	Ro James	source
December 6, 2016	Gucci Mane	source
December 6, 2016	Alsarah & the Nubatones	source
December 12, 2016	Derek Gripper	source
December 19, 2016	The Oh Hellos	source
December 21, 2016	Declan McKenna	source

=== 2017 ===
Date	Artists	NPR article
January 5, 2017	Donny McCaslin	source
January 9, 2017	Lila Downs	source
January 10, 2017	DRAM	source
January 17, 2017	Brent Cobb	source
January 19, 2017	BadBadNotGood	source
January 25, 2017	Gallant	source
January 25, 2017	Miramar	source
February 6, 2017	Run the Jewels	source
February 10, 2017	Esmé Patterson	source
February 15, 2017	Agnes Obel	source
February 21, 2017	Little Simz	source
February 28, 2017	Dirty Dozen Brass Band	source
March 3, 2017	Ninet	source
March 6, 2017	Maren Morris	source
March 9, 2017	Overcoats	source
March 10, 2017	Tank and the Bangas	source
March 13, 2017	Red Baraat	source
March 21, 2017	Sampha	source
March 24, 2017	Delicate Steve	source
April 3, 2017	Noname	source
April 6, 2017	Tash Sultana	source
April 7, 2017	Sinkane	source
April 12, 2017	Ljova and the Kontraband	source
April 13, 2017	Chicano Batman	source
April 19, 2017	Alt-J	source
April 28, 2017	Antonio Lizana	source
May 1, 2017	AverySunshine	source
May 5, 2017	Peter Silberman	source
May 8, 2017	Aimee Mann	source
May 12, 2017	Danilo Brito	source
May 15, 2017	Tim Darcy	source
May 19, 2017	Troker	source
May 22, 2017	Julia Jacklin	source
May 26, 2017	Gabriel Garzón-Montano	source
May 30, 2017	Royal Thunder	source
June 2, 2017	Nick Grant	source
June 5, 2017	Violents and Monica Martin	source
June 12, 2017	Perfume Genius	source
June 16, 2017	Penguin Cafe	source
June 19, 2017	Tigers Jaw	source
June 23, 2017	Holly Macve	source
June 26, 2017	Ravi Coltrane Quartet	source
June 30, 2017	Helado Negro	source
July 5, 2017	Chance the Rapper	source
July 10, 2017	Jay Som	source
July 14, 2017	Fragile Rock	source
July 17, 2017	Tuxedo	source
July 19, 2017	Rare Essence	source
July 20, 2017	Albin Lee Meldau	source
July 24, 2017	The Shins	source
July 28, 2017	Aldous Harding	source
August 1, 2017	Diet Cig	source
August 7, 2017	Maggie Rogers	source
August 14, 2017	ALA.NI	source
August 21, 2017	DJ Premier and the Badder Band	source
August 28, 2017	Jason Isbell	source
September 5, 2017	Jidenna	source
September 8, 2017	Frances Cone	source
September 12, 2017	Bleachers	source
September 13, 2017	L.A. Salami	source
September 15, 2017	Snail Mail	source
September 21, 2017	SsingSsing	source
September 22, 2017	Bomba Estéreo	source
September 25, 2017	Steve Martin and the Steep Canyon Rangers	source
September 27, 2017	Chronixx	source
September 29, 2017	Dawg Yawp	source
October 2, 2017	Paramore	source
October 6, 2017	Landlady	source
October 10, 2017	Randy Newman	source
October 16, 2017	Hanson	source
October 18, 2017	Thundercat	source
October 20, 2017	The Perceptionists	source
October 23, 2017	Shabazz Palaces	source
October 25, 2017	Japanese Breakfast	source
October 27, 2017	Natalia Lafourcade	source
October 30, 2017	The Roots feat. Bilal	source
November 1, 2017	Gracie and Rachel	source
November 3, 2017	Nate Smith + Kinfolk	source
November 6, 2017	Wyclef Jean	source
November 8, 2017	Ani DiFranco	source
November 10, 2017	The Mynabirds	source
November 14, 2017	Aminé	source
November 15, 2017	Now, Now	source
November 17, 2017	Benjamin Booker	source
November 20, 2017	Billy Corgan	source
November 21, 2017	Ledisi	source
November 24, 2017	David Greilsammer	source
November 27, 2017	Phoebe Bridgers	source
November 29, 2017	Moses Sumney	source
December 1, 2017	Walter Martin	source
December 4, 2017	Ted Leo	source
December 6, 2017	King Krule	source
December 8, 2017	Courtney Barnett and Kurt Vile	source
December 11, 2017	Tyler, the Creator	source
December 13, 2017	Cigarettes After Sex	source
December 15, 2017	This Is the Kit	source
December 18, 2017	Hanson for the Holidays	source

=== 2018 ===
Date	Artists	NPR article
January 3, 2018	Open Mike Eagle	source
January 5, 2018	Lo Moon	source
January 8, 2018	The Weather Station	source
January 10, 2018	Julien Baker	source
January 12, 2018	Daniil Trifonov	source
January 15, 2018	Artists from the Take Me to the River tour (Note: Featuring William Bell, Bobby Rush, Frayser Boy, and Al Kapone.)	source
January 16, 2018	AHI	source
January 17, 2018	The Lemon Twigs	source
January 19, 2018	Amadou and Mariam	source
January 22, 2018	St. Vincent	source
January 24, 2018	George Clinton and The P-Funk Allstars	source
January 26, 2018	Barbara Hannigan	source
January 29, 2018	Jamila Woods	source
January 31, 2018	Alice Smith	source
February 2, 2018	Vicente García	source
February 5, 2018	Hurray for the Riff Raff	source
February 7, 2018	Ibeyi	source
February 9, 2018	Wes Felton and Raheem DeVaughn as the Crossrhodes	source
February 12, 2018	Marlon Williams	source
February 14, 2018	Nick Hakim	source
February 16, 2018	Betsayda Machado y Parranda El Clavo	source
February 19, 2018	Big Daddy Kane	source
February 21, 2018	August Greene	source
February 23, 2018	Vagabon	source
February 26, 2018	Lee Ann Womack	source
March 1, 2018	Roy Ayers	source
March 2, 2018	Anna Meredith	source
March 5, 2018	Big K.R.I.T.	source
March 7, 2018	Alex Clare	source
March 9, 2018	Kuinka	source
March 12, 2018	John Prine	source
March 15, 2018	Raul Midón	source
March 19, 2018	Cornelius	source
March 23, 2018	Väsen	source
March 26, 2018	Jenny and the Mexicats	source
March 28, 2018	I'm With Her	source
March 30, 2018	Masta Ace	source
April 1, 2018	Robin Olson	source
April 2, 2018	Dee Dee Bridgewater	source
April 4, 2018	Dan Auerbach	source
April 9, 2018	Rhye	source
April 10, 2018	Lara Bello	source
April 11, 2018	Tyler Childers	source
April 13, 2018	Jorge Drexler	source
April 16, 2018	The Breeders	source
April 18, 2018	O.C.	source
April 20, 2018	John Moreland	source
April 23, 2018	Logan Richardson	source
April 25, 2018	Superorganism	source
April 27, 2018	ÌFÉ	source
April 30, 2018	Bedouine	source
May 2, 2018	GZA and the Soul Rebels	source
May 4, 2018	Darlingside	source
May 7, 2018	Gordi	source
May 11, 2018	Béla Fleck and Abigail Washburn	source
May 14, 2018	Naia Izumi	source
May 16, 2018	Khruangbin	source
May 18, 2018	Partner	source
May 21, 2018	Cast of the Broadway musical The Band's Visit (Note: Featuring Katrina Lenk, Tony Shalhoub, George Abud, Kristen Sieh, and Adam Kantor.)	source
May 23, 2018	Juanes and Mon Laferte	source
May 25, 2018	Ill Camille	source
May 29, 2018	Third Coast Percussion	source
May 30, 2018	Trouble Funk	source
June 1, 2018	Tom Misch	source
June 4, 2018	Daniel Caesar	source
June 6, 2018	Grace VanderWaal	source
June 8, 2018	Milck	source
June 11, 2018	Jorja Smith	source
June 13, 2018	GoldLink	source
June 15, 2018	Yissy García & Bandancha	source
June 18, 2018	Khalid	source
June 20, 2018	The Messthetics	source
June 22, 2018	From the Top	source
June 25, 2018	Rakim	source
June 27, 2018	Dave Matthews	source
June 29, 2018	Golden Dawn Arkestra	source
July 2, 2018	PJ Morton	source
July 9, 2018	Frédéric Yonnet with special guest Dave Chappelle	source
July 10, 2018	Rev. Sekou and the Seal Breakers	source
July 11, 2018	Mumu Fresh feat. Black Thought & DJ Dummy	source
July 18, 2018	Ali Shaheed Muhammad and Adrian Younge as the Midnight Hour	source
July 19, 2018	Ólafur Arnalds	source
July 23, 2018	The King's Singers	source
July 25, 2018	Lalah Hathaway	source
July 30, 2018	Flasher	source
August 1, 2018	The Del McCoury Band	source
August 3, 2018	Haley Heynderickx	source
August 6, 2018	Mac Miller	source
August 9, 2018	Dawn Richard	source
August 10, 2018	Tower of Power	source
August 14, 2018	Erykah Badu	source
August 16, 2018	Yo-Yo Ma	source
August 21, 2018	Camp Cope	source
August 23, 2018	Dermot Kennedy	source
August 24, 2018	T.I.	source
August 28, 2018	George Li	source
August 28, 2018	Tech N9ne feat. Krizz Kaliko	source
September 4, 2018	Kalbells	source
September 6, 2018	Jupiter & Okwess	source
September 11, 2018	Hobo Johnson	source
September 13, 2018	GoGo Penguin	source
September 14, 2018	Smif-N-Wessun	source
September 18, 2018	Julie Byrne	source
September 20, 2018	Anthony Roth Costanzo	source
September 24, 2018	Cécile McLorin Salvant	source
September 28, 2018	Saba	source
October 4, 2018	Cory Henry & the Funk Apostles	source
October 5, 2018	Big Boi	source
October 11, 2018	Florence and the Machine	source
October 11, 2018	Café Tacvba	source
October 16, 2018	Alfredo Rodríguez	source
October 18, 2018	Chromeo	source
October 23, 2018	Jim James	source
October 23, 2018	Cautious Clay	source
October 24, 2018	Liniker e os Caramelows	source
November 1, 2018	Nicholas Payton Trio	source
November 2, 2018	Bernie and the Believers feat. Essence	source
November 7, 2018	Pedro the Lion	source
November 8, 2018	Half Waif	source
November 15, 2018	Boygenius	source
November 16, 2018	Dvsn	source
November 27, 2018	The Innocence Mission	source
November 29, 2018	Joey Alexander	source
November 30, 2018	Dirty Projectors	source
December 4, 2018	Wu-Tang Clan	source
December 11, 2018	H.E.R.	source
December 12, 2018	Harold López-Nussa Trio	source
December 14, 2018	Amy Grant	source

=== 2019 ===
Date	Artists	NPR article
January 3, 2019	Miguel Zenón feat. Spektral Quartet	source
January 7, 2019	Buddy	source
January 10, 2019	Carolina Eyck and Clarice Jensen	source
January 14, 2019	Aaron Lee Tasjan	source
January 15, 2019	Nate Wood	source
January 18, 2019	Stella Donnelly	source
January 25, 2019	Blood Orange	source
February 1, 2019	Cat Power	source
February 5, 2019	Kurt Vile	source
February 11, 2019	Lau Noah	source
February 12, 2019	Mountain Man	source
February 14, 2019	The Pedrito Martinez Group	source
February 14, 2019	Scott Mulvahill	source
February 22, 2019	Natalie Prass	source
February 26, 2019	Zaytoven	source
March 4, 2019	Phony Ppl	source
March 6, 2019	Meg Myers	source
March 6, 2019	Leikeli47 (SXSW Family Hour, Central Presbyterian Church, Austin, Texas)	source
March 6, 2019	Amanda Palmer (SXSW Family Hour, Central Presbyterian Church, Austin, Texas)	source
March 6, 2019	Fragile Rock (SXSW Family Hour, Central Presbyterian Church, Austin, Texas)	source
March 6, 2019	Gina Chavez (SXSW Family Hour, Central Presbyterian Church, Austin, Texas)	source
March 6, 2019	Wyclef Jean (SXSW Family Hour, Central Presbyterian Church, Austin, Texas)	source
March 6, 2019	Mountain Man (SXSW Family Hour, Central Presbyterian Church, Austin, Texas)	source
March 6, 2019	John Paul White (SXSW Family Hour, Central Presbyterian Church, Austin, Texas)	source
March 6, 2019	Cautious Clay (SXSW Family Hour, Central Presbyterian Church, Austin, Texas)	source
March 6, 2019	Gaelynn Lea (SXSW Family Hour, Central Presbyterian Church, Austin, Texas)	source
March 8, 2019	Leikeli47	source
March 13, 2019	Kaia Kater	source
March 14, 2019	Nao	source
March 18, 2019	Alejandro Escovedo	source
March 22, 2019	&More (Chill Moody and Donn T)	source
March 25, 2019	Andrea Cruz	source
March 26, 2019	Weezer	source
April 1, 2019	Courtney Marie Andrews	source
April 4, 2019	Georgia Anne Muldrow	source
April 8, 2019	Karine Polwart Trio	source
April 11, 2019	Gary Clark Jr.	source
April 16, 2019	Theodore	source
April 19, 2019	Laraaji	source
April 19, 2019	Toro y Moi	source
April 19, 2019	Better Oblivion Community Center	source
April 19, 2019	The Calidore String Quartet	source
May 3, 2019	Ohmme	source
May 3, 2019	Thou	source
May 14, 2019	Magos Herrera and Brooklyn Rider	source
May 15, 2019	Ensemble Signal plays Jonny Greenwood	source
May 20, 2019	Jeremy Dutcher	source
May 23, 2019	Lucky Daye	source
May 30, 2019	Ladama	source
June 3, 2019	Quinn Christopherson	source
June 6, 2019	Tomberlin	source
June 10, 2019	Cast and crew of Sesame Street (Note: Featuring Ryan Dillon, Leslie Carrara-Rudolph, Eric Jacobson, Peter Linz, Matt Vogel, Carmen Osbahr, and David Rudman.)	source
June 12, 2019	Foxing	source
June 18, 2019	Idles	source
June 20, 2019	Imogen Heap	source
June 24, 2019	Tasha Cobbs Leonard	source
June 26, 2019	Betty Who	source
July 1, 2019	Cast of the Broadway musical Be More Chill (Note: Featuring Will Roland, George Salazar, Gerard Canonico, Tiffany Mann, Lauren Marcus, Britton Smith, and Jason Williams.)	source
July 3, 2019	Saint Sister	source
July 5, 2019	Miya Folick	source
July 8, 2019	American Football	source
July 10, 2019	Sting and Shaggy	source
July 12, 2019	Erin Rae	source
July 19, 2019	Priests	source
July 22, 2019	Jacob Collier	source
July 24, 2019	Masego	source
July 26, 2019	Tamino	source
July 29, 2019	Lizzo	source
August 1, 2019	Calexico and Iron & Wine	source
August 3, 2019	iLe	source
August 5, 2019	Bas	source
August 7, 2019	David Crosby & the Lighthouse Band	source
August 8, 2019	Ty Dolla Sign	source
August 9, 2019	Among Authors	source
August 12, 2019	Half Alive	source
August 16, 2019	Kian Soltani	source
August 19, 2019	Tobe Nwigwe	source
August 21, 2019	Nicole Bus	source
August 23, 2019	Mandolin Orange	source
August 26, 2019	47Soul	source
August 29, 2019	Dan Tepfer	source
August 30, 2019	The-Dream	source
September 3, 2019	A-WA	source
September 6, 2019	The Tallest Man on Earth	source
September 9, 2019	Damian "Jr. Gong" Marley	source
September 11, 2019	Cast of the Broadway musical Come from Away (Note: Featuring Petrina Bromley, Holly Ann Butler, Geno Carr, De'Lon Grant, Joel Hatch, Chad Kimball, Kevin McAllister, Happy McPartlin, Julie Reiber, Astrid Van Wieren, and Jim Walton.)	source
September 16, 2019	Rhiannon Giddens	source
September 18, 2019	Rosanne Cash	source
September 18, 2019	Nilüfer Yanya	source
September 20, 2019	Y La Bamba	source
September 25, 2019	Ari Lennox	source
September 27, 2019	Josh Ritter with Amanda Shires and Jason Isbell	source
September 30, 2019	Jonas Brothers	source
October 4, 2019	Molly Sarlé	source
October 7, 2019	Sharon Van Etten	source
October 9, 2019	Charly Bliss	source
October 15, 2019	Brittany Howard	source
October 16, 2019	Taylor Swift	source
October 18, 2019	Summer Walker	source
October 21, 2019	Jovino Santos Neto Trio	source
October 23, 2019	Chai	source
October 25, 2019	Rio Mira	source
October 28, 2019; Day 1 of 4 day live event	Megan Thee Stallion	source
October 29, 2019; Day 2 of 4 day live event	Sheryl Crow	source
October 30, 2019; Day 3 of 4 day live event	Wale	source
October 31, 2019; Day 4 of 4 day live event	Raphael Saadiq	source
November 6, 2019	BJ the Chicago Kid	source
November 8, 2019	Dave	source
November 12, 2019	Leslie Odom Jr.	source
November 13, 2019	Sunny War	source
November 15, 2019	Kokoko!	source
November 18, 2019	Burna Boy	source
November 20, 2019	Snarky Puppy	source
November 22, 2019	Igor Levit	source
November 25, 2019	Carly Rae Jepsen	source
November 27, 2019	Mereba	source
November 29, 2019	Black Uhuru	source
December 2, 2019; Recorded October 28, 2019	Megan Thee Stallion	source
December 3, 2019; Recorded October 29, 2019	Sheryl Crow	source
December 5, 2019; Recorded October 31, 2019	Raphael Saadiq	source
December 6, 2019	Freddie Gibbs & Madlib	source
December 9, 2019	Raveena	source
December 11, 2019	Weyes Blood	source
December 13, 2019	The Comet Is Coming	source
December 16, 2019	Moonchild	source
December 18, 2019	Los Lobos	source
December 20, 2019	Balún	source
December 31, 2019	Spanglish Fly	source

=== 2020 ===
Date	Artists	NPR article
January 3, 2020	Daniel Norgren	source
January 8, 2020	Bridget Kibbey	source
January 10, 2020	Brownout	source
January 13, 2020	Jordan Rakei	source
January 15, 2020	Joyce DiDonato	source
January 17, 2020	Yola	source
January 21, 2020; Recorded October 30, 2019	Wale	source
January 22, 2020	Max Richter	source
January 24, 2020	J.S. Ondara	source
January 27, 2020	Koffee	source
January 29, 2020	Jimmy Eat World	source
January 31, 2020	Rising Appalachia	source
February 3, 2020	Sir	source
February 5, 2020	Another Sky	source
February 7, 2020	Jonathan Scales Fourchestra	source
February 10, 2020	Baby Rose	source
February 12, 2020	Mount Eerie with Julie Doiron	source
February 14, 2020	Laura Stevenson	source
February 18, 2020	Snoh Aalegra	source
February 20, 2020	Elisapie	source
February 21, 2020	Chris Dave and the Drumhedz	source
February 24, 2020	Jenny Lewis	source
February 26, 2020	Indigo Sparke	source
February 28, 2020	Cimafunk	source
March 2, 2020	Bob Weir and Wolf Bros	source
March 3, 2020	Mellotron Variations	source
March 4, 2020	Terri Lyne Carrington + Social Science	source
March 6, 2020	Taimane	source
March 9, 2020	Coldplay	source
March 11, 2020	Kirill Gerstein	source
March 13, 2020	Chika	source
March 16, 2020	Harry Styles	source
March 18, 2020	Rex Orange County	source
March 20, 2020	Arthur Moon	source
March 23, 2020	The Black Crowes	source
March 24, 2020	Soccer Mommy	source
March 26, 2020	Margo Price and Jeremy Ivey	source
March 27, 2020	Tarriona "Tank" Ball	source
March 30, 2020	Allen Stone	source
April 1, 2020	Michael McDonald	source
April 3, 2020	Jesca Hoop	source
April 4, 2020	Ben Gibbard	source
April 6, 2020	The Lumineers	source
April 8, 2020	King Princess	source
April 9, 2020	Black Thought of the Roots	source
April 11, 2020	John Prine Tribute	source
April 13, 2020	Tōth	source
April 14, 2020	Kevin Morby and Waxahatchee	source
April 15, 2020	Angelica Garcia	source
April 16, 2020	Laura Marling	source
April 17, 2020	Lang Lang	source
April 20, 2020	The Free Nationals featuring Anderson .Paak, Chronixx and India Shawn	source
April 22, 2020	Nick Hakim	source
April 23, 2020	The Pop Ups	source
April 24, 2020	John Fogerty and family as Fogerty's Factory	source
April 27, 2020	Mahan Esfahani	source
April 28, 2020	Rodrigo y Gabriela	source
April 29, 2020	Daughter of Swords	source
April 30, 2020	Jeru the Damaja	source
May 1, 2020	Buck Curran	source
May 4, 2020	Jon Batiste	source
May 5, 2020	Lianne La Havas	source
May 7, 2020	Milck	source
May 8, 2020	Braxton Cook	source
May 11, 2020	Augustin Hadelich	source
May 13, 2020	Frances Quinlan	source
May 14, 2020	Ashley McBryde	source
May 15, 2020	Alex Isley	source
May 16, 2020	Raul Midón	source
May 18, 2020	Lankum	source
May 21, 2020	Sylvan Esso	source
May 22, 2020	Buddy and Kent Jamz	source
May 23, 2020	Clem Snide with Scott Avett	source
May 27, 2020	Wire	source
May 28, 2020	Rhiannon Giddens and Francesco Turrisi	source
May 29, 2020	D Smoke	source
May 30, 2020	Lara Downes	source
June 1, 2020	Cast of the Broadway musical Hadestown (Note: Featuring Reeve Carney, Eva Noblezada, André De Shields, Kimberly Marable, Patrick Page, Jewelle Blackman, Kay Trinidad, Yvette González-Nacer, and Anaïs Mitchell.)	source
June 4, 2020	Sa-Roc	source
June 10, 2020	Baby Rose	source
June 11, 2020	Kirby	source
June 12, 2020	PJ	source
June 15, 2020	Alicia Keys	source
June 17, 2020	Haim	source
June 18, 2020	Little Dragon	source
June 19, 2020	Benny the Butcher	source
June 21, 2020	Hamilton Leithauser & Family	source
June 22, 2020	Sudan Archives	source
June 24, 2020	Madame Gandhi	source
June 25, 2020	M. Ward	source
June 26, 2020	Beam	source
June 30, 2020	Coreyah	source
July 1, 2020	Malawi Mouse Boys	source
July 2, 2020	Fabiano do Nascimento	source
July 3, 2020	Trupa Trupa	source
July 6, 2020	Dirty Projectors	source
July 7, 2020	Chicano Batman	source
July 8, 2020	Roddy Ricch	source
July 9, 2020	Jacob Collier	source
July 13, 2020	Tom Misch and Yussef Dayes	source
July 14, 2020	Benny Sings	source
July 15, 2020	Diana Gordon	source
July 20, 2020	Lenny Kravitz	source
July 21, 2020	Tom Adams	source
July 22, 2020	Nilüfer Yanya	source
July 27, 2020	Lucinda Williams	source
July 28, 2020	Thao Nguyen	source
July 29, 2020	Lyric Jones	source
August 3, 2020	John Legend	source
August 4, 2020	Kate Davis	source
August 5, 2020	Melanie Faye	source
August 10, 2020	Moses Sumney	source
August 11, 2020	Becca Mancari	source
August 12, 2020	Víkingur Ólafsson	source
August 13, 2020	Flatbush Zombies	source
August 17, 2020	Norah Jones	source
August 18, 2020	Buscabulla	source
August 19, 2020	Lila Iké	source
August 20, 2020	Courtney Marie Andrews	source
August 24, 2020	Tame Impala	source
August 25, 2020	Yola	source
August 26, 2020	Billie Eilish	source
August 31, 2020	Tiwa Savage	source
September 1, 2020	Yo-Yo Ma, Stuart Duncan, Edgar Meyer and Chris Thile	source
September 2, 2020	Anat Cohen and Marcello Gonçalves	source
September 3, 2020	Burt Bacharach and Daniel Tashian	source
September 8, 2020	Protoje	source
September 9, 2020	Bill Callahan	source
September 10, 2020	Phoebe Bridgers	source
September 14, 2020	Declan McKenna	source
September 15, 2020	Arlo Parks	source
September 16, 2020	Nubya Garcia	source
September 21, 2020	BTS	source
September 22, 2020	Oddisee	source
September 23, 2020	Conway the Machine	source
September 24, 2020	Brandy Clark	source
September 28, 2020	Bright Eyes	source
September 29, 2020	The Good Ones	source
September 30, 2020	Jason Isbell and Amanda Shires	source
October 1, 2020	Jhené Aiko	source
October 5, 2020	Linda Diaz	source
October 6, 2020	Little Big Town	source
October 7, 2020	Angel Olsen	source
October 9, 2020	The Flaming Lips	source
October 13, 2020	Lido Pimienta	source
October 14, 2020	Carlos Vives	source
October 15, 2020	Bebel Gilberto	source
October 16, 2020	Ozuna	source
October 19, 2020	Gracie and Rachel	source
October 20, 2020	Kingfish	source
October 21, 2020	Leo Kottke and Mike Gordon	source
October 23, 2020	Spillage Village	source
October 26, 2020	Katie Pruitt	source
October 27, 2020	GroundUP Family Dinner	source
October 28, 2020	Ty Dolla Sign	source
October 30, 2020	Sad13	source
November 4, 2020	Polo G	source
November 6, 2020	Tiana Major9	source
November 9, 2020	Mickey Guyton	source
November 10, 2020	Shirley Collins	source
November 11, 2020	Tigran Hamasyan	source
November 13, 2020	Michael Boriskin, Curtis Macomber and Carol Wincenc playing music by Aaron Copland in his house	source
November 16, 2020	Michael Kiwanuka	source
November 17, 2020	Owen Pallett	source
November 18, 2020	Adrianne Lenker	source
November 23, 2020	Kem	source
November 24, 2020	Don Bryant	source
November 25, 2020	Mulatto	source
November 30, 2020	Mac Ayres	source
December 1, 2020	Julia Bullock	source
December 2, 2020	PJ Morton	source
December 4, 2020	Dua Lipa	source
December 7, 2020	Black Pumas	source
December 8, 2020	Chloe x Halle	source
December 9, 2020	Hayley Williams	source
December 11, 2020	Ashley Ray	source
December 14, 2020	Jonathan Biss	source
December 15, 2020	Borromeo String Quartet	source
December 16, 2020	Jan Vogler and Alessio Bax	source
December 21, 2020	Cory Henry	source

=== 2021 ===
Date	Artists	NPR article
January 5, 2021	Sevdaliza	source
January 6, 2021	Active Child	source
January 8, 2021	Jazmine Sullivan	source
January 15, 2021	Mxmtoon	source
January 16, 2021	Dedicated Men of Zion	source
January 16, 2021	Labess	source
January 16, 2021	Sofia Rei	source
January 16, 2021	DakhaBrakha	source
January 17, 2021	Minyo Crusaders	source
January 17, 2021	Natu Camara	source
January 17, 2021	Hit La Rosa	source
January 17, 2021	Emel Mathlouthi	source
January 18, 2021	Th1rt3en	source
January 19, 2021	Gabriel Garzón-Montano	source
January 19, 2021	Nora Brown	source
January 21, 2021	Pup	source
January 22, 2021	Max Richter	source
January 23, 2021	Vox Sambou	source
January 23, 2021	Aditya Prakash Ensemble	source
January 23, 2021	Rachele Andrioli	source
January 23, 2021	Martha Redbone	source
January 24, 2021	Edwin Perez	source
January 24, 2021	Elisapie	source
January 24, 2021	Rokia Traoré	source
January 25, 2021	Future Islands	source
January 26, 2021	Sevana	source
January 27, 2021	Lous and the Yakuza	source
January 28, 2021	Miley Cyrus	source
January 29, 2021	Muzz	source
February 2, 2021	JLCO Septet with Wynton Marsalis	source
February 3, 2021	Immanuel Wilkins	source
February 4, 2021	Melanie Charles	source
February 9, 2021	Giveon	source
February 10, 2021	Meshell Ndegeocello	source
February 11, 2021	Keiyaa	source
February 16, 2021	Rick Ross	source
February 17, 2021	2 Chainz	source
February 18, 2021	Rae Khalil	source
February 22, 2021	Bartees Strange	source
February 23, 2021	Sampa the Great	source
February 24, 2021	Davido	source
February 25, 2021	Kirk Franklin	source
March 3, 2021	Jack Harlow	source
March 4, 2021	Ólafur Arnalds	source
March 9, 2021	Fleet Foxes	source
March 10, 2021	Celebrating compilation Rhythms of Zamunda; six artists perform a selection of music inspired by the music of Coming 2 America	source
March 11, 2021	Black Coffee	source
March 15, 2021	Xavier Omär	source
March 17, 2021	Justin Bieber	source
March 22, 2021	Sting	source
March 23, 2021	Liam Bailey	source
March 25, 2021	Buck Meek	source
March 29, 2021	Kacy & Clayton and Marlon Williams	source
April 5, 2021	Steady Holiday	source
April 6, 2021	Yasser Tejeda and Palotré	source
April 7, 2021	Duckwrth	source
April 8, 2021	Clipping	source
April 12, 2021	Nathaniel Rateliff	source
April 14, 2021	Demi Lovato	source
April 15, 2021	Carm	source
April 19, 2021	Rina Sawayama	source
April 20, 2021	C. Tangana	source
April 21, 2021	Butcher Brown	source
April 25, 2021	ChocQuibTown	source
April 26, 2021	Shelley FKA DRAM	source
April 27, 2021	Lake Street Dive	source
April 28, 2021	Son Lux	source
April 29, 2021	Rod Wave	source
May 1, 2021	Nenny	source
May 2, 2021	Luedji Luna	source
May 3, 2021	Calma Carmona	source
May 5, 2021	Cande y Paulo	source
May 6, 2021	Negativland	source
May 7, 2021	Moses Boyd	source
May 10, 2021	Ani DiFranco	source
May 13, 2021	Sara Watkins	source
May 18, 2021	Palberta	source
May 19, 2021	Kathleen Edwards	source
May 20, 2021	Laurie Anderson	source
May 24, 2021	Mdou Moctar	source
May 25, 2021	Deep Sea Diver	source
May 26, 2021	Brothers Osborne	source
May 27, 2021	Karol G	source
June 1, 2021	Fat Joe	source
June 2, 2021	Buzzy Lee	source
June 3, 2021	The Hold Steady	source
June 7, 2021	Tom Jones	source
June 8, 2021	Rostam	source
June 9, 2021	Merry Clayton	source
June 14, 2021	Joseph Keckler	source
June 16, 2021	Men I Trust	source
June 17, 2021	Pino Palladino and Blake Mills	source
June 21, 2021	Jack Ingram, Miranda Lambert, Jon Randall	source
June 23, 2021	Liz Phair	source
June 24, 2021	Mahani Teave	source
June 28, 2021	Carrtoons, Kaelin Ellis, Kiefer and the Kount	source
June 30, 2021	From the Top	source
July 1, 2021	Sleater-Kinney	source
July 6, 2021	Dry Cleaning	source
July 8, 2021	Black Motion	source
July 9, 2021	Jambinai	source
July 12, 2021	Bleachers	source
July 15, 2021	Lucy Dacus	source
July 20, 2021	The Weather Station	source
July 21, 2021	Maple Glider	source
July 23, 2021	Vince Staples	source
July 27, 2021	Young Thug	source
July 28, 2021	Anna B Savage	source
July 30, 2021	Shame	source
August 3, 2021	Dinosaur Jr.	source
August 4, 2021	Hiatus Kaiyote	source
August 9, 2021	Ben Howard	source
August 10, 2021	Flock of Dimes	source
August 18, 2021	The Isley Brothers	source
August 20, 2021	Joy Oladokun	source
August 25, 2021	Migos	source
August 31, 2021	Little Simz	source
September 1, 2021	The Staves	source
September 3, 2021	Rico Nasty	source
September 8, 2021	Yebba	source
September 9, 2021	Pastor T.L. Barrett & the Royal Voices of Life	source
September 10, 2021	Royce da 5'9"	source
September 16, 2021	J Balvin	source
September 17, 2021	Diamante Eléctrico	source
September 22, 2021	Maye	source
September 27, 2021	Silvana Estrada	source
September 29, 2021	Eme Alfonso	source
October 4, 2021	Sech	source
October 6, 2021	Prince Royce	source
October 8, 2021	Yendry	source
October 13, 2021	Nicki Nicole	source
October 15, 2021	Camila Cabello	source
October 18, 2021	Cha Wa	source
October 19, 2021	Yasmin Williams	source
October 21, 2021	Cast of the Broadway musical Jagged Little Pill (Note: Featuring Heidi Blickenstaff, Morgan Dudley, Sean Allan Krill, Derek Klena, Lauren Patten, and Kathryn Gallagher.)	source
October 25, 2021	Circuit des Yeux	source
October 26, 2021	Ed Sheeran	source
October 27, 2021	Neffy	source
November 1, 2021	The War on Drugs	source
November 3, 2021	Joss Favela	source
November 4, 2021	Tems	source
November 8, 2021	William Prince	source
November 9, 2021	Ya Tseen	source
November 10, 2021	Raye Zaragoza	source
November 15, 2021	Cast of the Broadway musical Company	source
November 17, 2021	Sloppy Jane	source
December 1, 2021	Wet Leg	source
December 7, 2021	Olivia Rodrigo	source
December 8, 2021	Arooj Aftab	source
December 10, 2021	Mick Jenkins	source
December 13, 2021	Robert Plant and Alison Krauss	source
December 17, 2021	Insecure Takeover Part 2 (the first collaboration with Insecure was an experiment early in the run of Tiny Desk (Home) concerts)	source
December 20, 2021	Jonathan McReynolds and Mali Music	source

=== 2022 ===
Date	Artists	NPR article
January 5, 2022	Turnstile	source
January 7, 2022	Esperanza Spalding	source
January 12, 2022	Mon Laferte	source
January 14, 2022	Cordae	source
January 25, 2022	Jake Xerxes Fussell	source
January 27, 2022	Suistamon Sähkö	source
January 27, 2022	Bedouin Burger	source
January 27, 2022	ADG7	source
January 28, 2022	Kombilesa Mí	source
January 28, 2022	Northern Cree	source
January 28, 2022	Son Rompe Pera	source
January 29, 2022	Al Bilali Soudan	source
January 29, 2022	Kiran Ahluwalia	source
January 29, 2022	Tufan Derince	source
January 31, 2022	Amber Mark	source
February 2, 2022	Tori Amos	source
February 3, 2022	Fatoumata Diawara	source
February 4, 2022	El DeBarge	source
February 11, 2022	Catherine Russell	source
February 15, 2022	Anthony Roth Costanzo and Justin Vivian Bond	source
February 17, 2022	Too Short	source
February 22, 2022	Buffalo Nichols	source
February 23, 2022	Patti LaBelle	source
February 25, 2022	Pastor Shirley Caesar	source
March 3, 2022	Fireboy DML	source
March 8, 2022	Patricia Kopatchinskaja	source
March 9, 2022	Abdullah Ibrahim	source
March 11, 2022	Camilo	source
March 15, 2022	Bonobo	source
March 17, 2022	Daniel Hope	source
March 21, 2022	Yard Act	source
March 22, 2022	Kaina	source
March 23, 2022	Pom Pom Squad	source
March 24, 2022	Maxo Kream	source
March 28, 2022	Madi Diaz	source
March 30, 2022	Los Rivera Destino	source
April 4, 2022	Maren Morris	source
April 8, 2022	Leif Ove Andsnes	source
April 11, 2022	The Linda Lindas	source
April 13, 2022	Brittany Davis	source
April 14, 2022	Mehro	source
April 15, 2022	Samora Pinderhughes	source
April 20, 2022	Currensy	source
April 21, 2022	S. Carey	source
April 22, 2022	Feid	source
April 26, 2022	Cast of the Broadway musical A Strange Loop (Note: Featuring Jaquel Spivey, L Morgan Lee, James Jackson Jr., John-Michael Lyles, John-Andrew Morrison, and Jason Veasey.)	source
April 27, 2022	Roger Eno	source
May 2, 2022	Thee Sinseers	source
May 4, 2022	Ron Carter	source
May 6, 2022	Cast of the off-Broadway revival of Little Shop of Horrors (Note: Featuring Conrad Ricamora, Tammy Blanchard, Christian Borle, Aaron Arnell Harrington, Stuart Zagnit, Tatiana Lofton, Cristina Raé, Khadija Sankoh, and Alan Menken.)	source
May 9, 2022	Aoife O'Donovan	source
May 11, 2022	ARC Ensemble	source
May 12, 2022	Buffy Sainte-Marie	source
May 17, 2022	Fontaines D.C.	source
May 18, 2022	IDK	source
May 20, 2022	pH-1, Mndsgn and Audrey Nuna	source
May 24, 2022	Ada Lea	source
May 25, 2022	Svaneborg Kardyb	source
May 31, 2022	Alisa Amador	source
June 2, 2022	Adekunle Gold	source
June 3, 2022	James Francies	source
June 8, 2022	Naira Marley	source
June 10, 2022	FKA Twigs	source
June 16, 2022	Larry June	source
June 22, 2022	Ravyn Lenae	source
June 23, 2022	Maverick City Music	source
June 24, 2022	Monica	source
June 27, 2022	J'Nai Bridges	source
June 29, 2022	Denzel Curry	source
June 30, 2022	Usher	source
July 1, 2022	Essential Voices USA	source
July 6, 2022	Maylee Todd	source
July 7, 2022	French Kiwi Juice	source
July 8, 2022	Belle and Sebastian	source
July 12, 2022	Animal Collective	source
July 14, 2022	Curse of Lono	source
July 15, 2022	Ludovico Einaudi	source
July 19, 2022	Mivos Quartet	source
July 20, 2022	Big Thief	source
July 28, 2022	Pigeon Pit	source
August 3, 2022	Madison Cunningham	source
August 5, 2022	Regina Spektor	source
August 10, 2022	Domi and JD Beck	source
August 11, 2022	SFJAZZ Collective	source
August 12, 2022	Andrew Bird and Iron & Wine	source
August 19, 2022	ADG7	source
August 29, 2022	Endea Owens and the Cookout	source
August 31, 2022	Isaiah J. Thompson Quartet	source
September 1, 2022	Cast of the Broadway musical Six (Note: Featuring Khaila Wilcoxon, Storm Lever, Jasmine Forsberg, Olivia Donalson, Didi Romero, and Gabriela Carrillo.)	source
September 2, 2022	Juilliard Jazz Ensemble	source
September 6, 2022	Randall Goosby	source
September 8, 2022	JID	source
September 12, 2022	Angélique Kidjo	source
September 14, 2022	Allison Russell	source
September 15, 2022	Omar Apollo	source
September 19, 2022	Carin León	source
September 21, 2022	Girl Ultra	source
September 27, 2022	Trueno	source
September 30, 2022	Jessie Reyez	source
October 5, 2022	Susana Baca	source
October 7, 2022	Carla Morrison	source
October 12, 2022	Tokischa	source
October 14, 2022	Farruko	source
October 18, 2022	Joyce Wrice	source
October 20, 2022	Leyla McCalla	source
October 24, 2022	The Crossing	source
October 26, 2022	S.G. Goodman	source
October 28, 2022	Symba	source
November 2, 2022	King Princess	source
November 4, 2022	NoSo	source
November 8, 2022	Lizzy McAlpine	source
November 10, 2022	Ezra Collective	source
November 11, 2022	Cast of the Broadway musical The Lion King (Note: Featuring L. Steven Taylor, Tshidi Manye, Brandon A. McCall, Pearl Khwezi, Lindiwe Dlamini, Mduduzi Madela, and S'bu Ngema.)	source
November 15, 2022	Sheku Kanneh-Mason	source
November 18, 2022	Horace Andy	source
November 21, 2022	Santigold	source
November 29, 2022	Beabadoobee	source
December 1, 2022	Amelia Meath and Alexandra Sauser-Monnig as The A's	source
December 2, 2022	RM of BTS	source
December 5, 2022	Stromae	source
December 7, 2022	Alex G	source
December 9, 2022	Eliane Elias	source
December 12, 2022	The Mavericks	source
December 14, 2022	Westside Boogie	source

=== 2023 ===
Date	Artists	NPR article
January 3, 2023	The Smile	source
January 6, 2023	Jake Blount	source
January 10, 2023	Dodie	source
January 13, 2023	Marc-André Hamelin	source
January 18, 2023	Soccer Mommy	source
January 31, 2023	Hermanos Gutiérrez	source
February 1, 2023	Lady Wray	source
February 7, 2023	Indigo Girls	source
February 10, 2023	Lee Fields	source
February 13, 2023	Kenny Beats	source
February 15, 2023	Fousheé	source
February 17, 2023	Theo Croker	source
February 20, 2023	Tamela Mann	source
February 23, 2023	Ab-Soul	source
February 24, 2023	Charley Crockett	source
February 28, 2023	Omah Lay	source
March 2, 2023	Antonio Sánchez and Bad Hombre	source
March 6, 2023	Jorge Glem and Sam Reider	source
March 8, 2023	Mama's Broke	source
March 9, 2023	Selina Moon	source
March 15, 2023	Andrew Combs	source
March 17, 2023	Bono and the Edge	source
March 20, 2023	Tye Tribbett	source
March 22, 2023	Ingrid Andress	source
March 24, 2023	The Bad Ends	source
March 28, 2023	The Beths	source
March 31, 2023	Durand Bernarr	source
April 5, 2023	Kassa Overall	source
April 7, 2023	Trina	source
April 10, 2023	Fred again..	source
April 12, 2023	RAYE	source
April 17, 2023	Claudia Acuña	source
April 21, 2023	Lara Downes	source
April 26, 2023	Bill Orcutt Guitar Quartet	source
April 28, 2023	Cuco	source
May 2, 2023	Kenny Garrett and Sounds From The Ancestors	source
May 3, 2023	caroline	source
May 10, 2023	Sid Sriram	source
May 12, 2023	Arooj Aftab, Vijay Iyer, and Shahzad Ismaily	source
May 15, 2023	Karol G	source
May 17, 2023	Lewis Capaldi	source
May 19, 2023	Cast of the musical Kimberley Akimbo (Note: Featuring Victoria Clark, Steven Boyer, Alli Mauzey, Bonnie Milligan, Olivia Elease Hardy, Fernell Hogan, Michael Iskander, and Nina White.)	source
May 22, 2023	Anna Tivel	source
May 26, 2023	Jay Park	source
May 30, 2023	Little Moon	source
May 31, 2023	NIKI	source
June 2, 2023	Unknown Mortal Orchestra	source
June 5, 2023	Charlie Wilson	source
June 9, 2023	Babyface	source
June 14, 2023	Tank	source
June 16, 2023	Adam Blackstone	source
June 20, 2023	Ambré	source
June 22, 2023	Amaarae	source
June 23, 2023	Muna	source
June 26, 2023	Wild Up	source
June 28, 2023	Brandee Younger	source
June 30, 2023	Juvenile	source
July 5, 2023	Omar Sosa, Seckou Keita, SUBA Trio	source
July 7, 2023	Meridian Brothers	source
July 11, 2023	Lisa O'Neill	source
July 13, 2023	Maro	source
July 14, 2023	Alice Sara Ott	source
July 17, 2023	Gwar	source
July 18, 2023	Sparks	source
July 20, 2023	Cypress Hill	source
July 24, 2023	Kany García	source
July 27, 2023	Peter One	source
August 2, 2023	Obongjayar	source
August 4, 2023	Gregorio Uribe	source
August 8, 2023	Action Bronson	source
August 11, 2023	Little Dragon	source
August 15, 2023	Post Malone	source
August 17, 2023	Omar Montes	source
August 18, 2023	Sarah Cahill	source
August 24, 2023	Yahritza y Su Esencia	source
August 30, 2023	Christian McBride's New Jawn	source
August 31, 2023	Speedy Ortiz	source
September 5, 2023	Chlöe	source
September 7, 2023	Anne Akiko Meyers	source
September 8, 2023	Hiromi	source
September 13, 2023	Indigo De Souza	source
September 14, 2023	V of BTS	source
September 19, 2023	Rawayana	source
September 21, 2023	Cast of the musical Wicked (Note: Featuring Alyssa Fox and McKenzie Kurtz.)	source
September 22, 2023	J Noa	source
September 27, 2023	DannyLux	source
September 29, 2023	Sam Smith	source
October 4, 2023	Alex Cuba	source
October 6, 2023	Villano Antillano	source
October 10, 2023	Caroline Polachek	source
October 11, 2023	Ivy Queen	source
October 13, 2023	Becky G	source
October 16, 2023	Smokey Robinson	source
October 20, 2023	Maluma	source
October 23, 2023	Jordan Ward	source
October 24, 2023	Nora Brown, Stephanie Coleman	source
October 26, 2023	Nile Rodgers, Chic	source
October 30, 2023	Shakti	source
November 1, 2023	Arlo Parks	source
November 3, 2023	Conrad Tao, Caleb Teicher	source
November 6, 2023	Emerson String Quartet	source
November 8, 2023	Samia	source
November 10, 2023	Noname	source
November 13, 2023	Hayden Pedigo	source
November 15, 2023	Marta Pereira da Costa	source
November 17, 2023	PJ Harvey	source
November 20, 2023	Cast of the musical Shucked (Note: Featuring Isabelle McCalla, Alex Newell, John Behlmann, Kevin Cahoon, Andrew Durand, Grey Henson, and Ashley D. Kelley.)	source
November 22, 2023	William Prince	source
November 27, 2023	Tomorrow X Together	source
November 29, 2023	Sampha	source
December 1, 2023	Aja Monet	source
December 4, 2023	Philip Selway	source
December 7, 2023	The LeeVees	source
December 11, 2023	Olivia Rodrigo	source
December 13, 2023	Laufey	source
December 15, 2023	Alvvays	source
December 18, 2023	Scarface	source
December 20, 2023	Louis Cato	source
December 22, 2023	Cast of the musical Sweeney Todd: The Demon Barber of Fleet Street (Note: Featuring Josh Groban, Annaleigh Ashford, Daniel Yearwood, Maria Bilbao, and Joanna Carpenter.)	source

=== 2024 ===
Date	Artists	NPR article
January 5, 2024	Sunny Jain's Wild Wild East	source
January 8, 2024	Kevin Kaarl	source
January 10, 2024	The Good Ones	source
January 12, 2024	yMusic	source
January 18, 2024	The Japanese House	source
January 22, 2024	Hania Rani	source
January 24, 2024	Blk Odyssy	source
January 26, 2024	Thee Sacred Souls	source
January 29, 2024	Katie Von Schleicher	source
January 31, 2024	Timo Andres	source
February 2, 2024	Joshua Redman	source
February 5, 2024	Carrtoons	source
February 7, 2024	Berhana	source
February 9, 2024	Tinashe	source
February 16, 2024	Cinder Well	source
February 19, 2024	Irreversible Entanglements	source
February 21, 2024	Jeezy	source
February 23, 2024	Kelela	source
February 28, 2024	Butcher Brown	source
March 1, 2024	Wednesday	source
March 6, 2024	Squirrel Flower	source
March 11, 2024	311	source
March 13, 2024	Jennifer Koh, Missy Mazzoli	source
March 15, 2024	Justin Timberlake	source
March 21, 2024	Chappell Roan	source
March 22, 2024	Soul Glo	source
March 27, 2024	Big Sean	source
March 28, 2024	Víkingur Ólafsson	source
April 1, 2024	Thandiswa Mazwai	source
April 3, 2024	Tarta Relena	source
April 5, 2024	El Laberinto del Coco	source
April 8, 2024	Linda May Han Oh	source
April 10, 2024	Yaya Bey	source
April 12, 2024	Fujii Kaze	source
April 15, 2024	Sleater-Kinney	source
April 17, 2024	Hauschka	source
April 19, 2024	Lise Davidsen	source
April 22, 2024	Hot Chip	source
April 26, 2024	Ne-Yo	source
April 29, 2024	Marty Stuart and His Fabulous Superlatives	source
May 1, 2024	Willow	source
May 3, 2024	Otoboke Beaver	source
May 6, 2024	Kiefer	source
May 8, 2024	Yasser Tejeda	source
May 10, 2024	Luciana Souza	source
May 13, 2024	Gary Bartz	source
May 15, 2024	Ana Tijoux	source
May 17, 2024	The Staves	source
May 20, 2024	Bob James	source
May 24, 2024	Nelly Furtado	source
May 29, 2024	The Philharmonik	source
May 31, 2024	Sean Paul	source
June 3, 2024	Tems	source
June 5, 2024	Lakecia Benjamin	source
June 7, 2024	Tierra Whack	source
June 11, 2024	Chaka Khan	source
June 14, 2024	Kierra Sheard	source
June 18, 2024	Meshell Ndegeocello	source
June 21, 2024	Brittney Spencer	source
June 26, 2024	Flo Milli	source
June 28, 2024	SWV	source
July 1, 2024	Sílvia Pérez Cruz	source
July 3, 2024	Laura Jane Grace & the Mississippi Medicals	source
July 8, 2024	María José Llergo	source
July 10, 2024	Julius Rodriguez	source
July 12, 2024	The Wiz	source
July 15, 2024	Nathy Peluso	source
July 17, 2024	Phish	source
July 19, 2024	Álvaro Díaz	source
July 22, 2024	Norah Jones	source
July 24, 2024	Feist	source
July 26, 2024	Ryan Leslie	source
July 29, 2024	Shae Universe	source
July 31, 2024	Kehlani	source
August 2, 2024	The LOX	source
August 5, 2024	Alana Springsteen	source
August 7, 2024	Milton Nascimento & Esperanza Spalding	source
August 9, 2024	Devo	source
August 12, 2024	Chucho Valdés	source
August 14, 2024	Sierra Ferrell	source
August 16, 2024	Keyon Harrold	source
August 19, 2024	Katy Kirby	source
August 23, 2024	Maxwell	source
August 27, 2024	Lainey Wilson	source
August 30, 2024	Pygmy Lush	source
September 10, 2024	Mdou Moctar	source
September 12, 2024	Remi Wolf	source
September 16, 2024	Juanes	source
September 18, 2024	Danny Ocean	source
September 20, 2024	Daniel, Me Estás Matando	source
September 24, 2024	Okan	source
September 26, 2024	Ivan Cornejo	source
September 30, 2024	Fabiola Méndez	source
October 2, 2024	Rita Payés	source
October 4, 2024	Ca7riel & Paco Amoroso	source
October 7, 2024	Eladio Carrión	source
October 9, 2024	The Marías	source
October 11, 2024	Sheila E.	source
October 16, 2024	John Holiday	source
October 18, 2024	Audrey Nuna	source
October 21, 2024	Kamasi Washington	source
October 23, 2024	The Baylor Project	source
October 25, 2024	Dua Lipa	source
October 28, 2024	Sylo	source
October 30, 2024	Chelsea Wolfe	source
November 1, 2024	Sheer Mag	source
November 8, 2024	LaRussell	source
November 11, 2024	Elmiene	source
November 13, 2024	Yunchan Lim	source
November 15, 2024	Durand Jones	source
November 20, 2024	The Magnetic Fields	source
November 22, 2024	Wyatt Flores	source
November 25, 2024	Teedra Moses	source
November 27, 2024	TV on the Radio	source
December 2, 2024	Rosie Tucker	source
December 4, 2024	Old Crow Medicine Show	source
December 6, 2024	Doechii	source
December 10, 2024	Cast of the Broadway play Stereophonic	source
December 12, 2024	Billie Eilish	source
December 16, 2024	Waxahatchee	source
December 18, 2024	Yo Gabba Gabbaland!	source
December 20, 2024	Sabrina Carpenter	source

=== 2025 ===
Date	Artists	NPR article
January 7, 2025	Isata Kanneh-Mason	source
January 13, 2025	Machel Montano	source
January 15, 2025	From the Top	source
January 17, 2025	The Red Clay Strays	source
January 21, 2025	Bilal	source
January 23, 2025	Carminho	source
January 29, 2025	MJ Lenderman	source
January 31, 2025	Faye Webster	source
February 3, 2025	Braxton Cook	source
February 5, 2025	Roberto Fonseca	source
February 7, 2025	Yasmin Williams	source
February 11, 2025	Girl in Red	source
February 18, 2025	Bartees Strange	source
February 20, 2025	Leon Thomas	source
February 26, 2025	Igmar Thomas' Revive Big Band	source
February 28, 2025	Marvin Sapp	source
March 3, 2025	Abel Selaocoe	source
March 5, 2025	Saya Gray	source
March 7, 2025	Megan Moroney	source
March 11, 2025	IDK & Sector 202	source
March 13, 2025	Third Eye Blind	source
March 17, 2025	Yseult	source
March 19, 2025	Cordae	source
March 21, 2025	Jean-Yves Thibaudet	source
March 24, 2025	Cass McCombs	source
March 26, 2025	Julia Bullock & Christian Reif	source
March 28, 2025	Sandbox Percussion	source
March 31, 2025	Elida Almeida	source
April 1, 2025	Chocolate Droppa	source
April 2, 2025	Zar Electrik	source
April 4, 2025	Rebolu	source
April 7, 2025	Bad Bunny	source
April 9, 2025	Nubya Garcia	source
April 11, 2025	Yu Sakai feat. TBN Trio	source
April 14, 2025	Illuminati Hotties	source
April 16, 2025	Panda Bear	source
April 18, 2025	Sharon Isbin & Amjad Ali Khan's Strings for Peace	source
April 22, 2025	Cast of the Broadway musical Gypsy (Note: Featuring Audra McDonald, Danny Burstein, Joy Woods, Jordan Tyson, Lesli Margherita, Lili Thomas, and Mylinda Hull.)	source
April 24, 2025	Grupo Frontera	source
April 28, 2025	Madison McFerrin	source
May 1, 2025	PJ Sin Suela	source
May 5, 2025	Cast of the Broadway musical Sunset Boulevard (Note: Featuring Nicole Scherzinger and Tom Francis.)	source
May 7, 2025	Jeff Parker ETA IVtet	source
May 9, 2025	Katie Gavin	source
May 12, 2025	Beth Gibbons	source
May 17, 2025	Carin León	source
May 19, 2025	Cast of the Broadway musical Death Becomes Her (Note: Featuring Megan Hilty, Jennifer Simard, Michelle Williams, Christopher Sieber, Taurean Everett, and Josh Lamon.)	source
May 21, 2025	Artemis	source
May 27, 2025	Cast of the Broadway musical Buena Vista Social Club	source
May 29, 2025	Ruby Ibarra	source
June 2, 2025	E-40	source
June 6, 2025	Amerie	source
June 11, 2025	Wiz Khalifa	source
June 13, 2025	CeCe Winans	source
June 17, 2025	Stanley Clarke	source
June 20, 2025	Beenie Man	source
June 23, 2025	Alex Isley	source
June 25, 2025	Living Colour	source
June 27, 2025	Rico Nasty	source
July 2, 2025	Gillian Welch & David Rawlings	source
July 7, 2025	Takács Quartet	source
July 9, 2025	Wet Leg	source
July 11, 2025	Clipse	source
July 15, 2025	Bloc Party	source
July 17, 2025	Anohni and the Johnsons	source
July 22, 2025	Rusowsky	source
July 24, 2025	Pup	source
July 29, 2025	Sasha Keable	source
August 1, 2025	Sierra Hull	source
August 5, 2025	River Tiber	source
August 7, 2025	MIKE	source
August 12, 2025	Mekons	source
August 14, 2025	Omar	source
August 18, 2025	Nduduzo Makhathini	source
August 20, 2025	Guster	source
August 22, 2025	Ty Segall	source
September 3, 2025	Mustafa	source
September 5, 2025	PinkPantheress	source
September 8, 2025	Michael Mayo	source
September 9, 2025	Ed Sheeran	source
September 10, 2025	Turnstile	source
September 15, 2025	Fito Páez	source
September 17, 2025	Luiza Brina	source
September 19, 2025	Lido Pimienta	source
September 23, 2025	Carlos Vives	source
September 25, 2025	Chuwi	source
September 30, 2025	Adrian Quesada	source
October 2, 2025	Rubio	source
October 6, 2025	31 Minutos	source
October 10, 2025	Macario Martínez	source
October 13, 2025	Gloria Estefan	source
October 15, 2025	Silvana Estrada	source
October 17, 2025	Tame Impala	source
October 20, 2025	Kokoroko	source
October 22, 2025	Parcels	source
October 24, 2025	Asake	source
October 27, 2025	The Beaches	source
October 29, 2025	Oklou	source
October 31, 2025	clipping.	source
November 3, 2025	Emily King	source
November 5, 2025	The Doobie Brothers	source
November 7, 2025	Nova Twins	source
November 11, 2025	Kris Davis Trio	source
November 13, 2025	Pulp	source
November 17, 2025	Ghost-Note	source
November 19, 2025	Goo Goo Dolls	source
November 21, 2025	Robert Plant	source
November 24, 2025	Seventeen	source
December 1, 2025	David Byrne	source
December 3, 2025	Brandi Carlile	source
December 5, 2025	Air	source
December 8, 2025	Annie DiRusso	source
December 10, 2025	Billy Strings	source
December 12, 2025	Sean Shibe	source
December 15, 2025	Odeal	source
December 17, 2025	Sixpence None the Richer	source
December 19, 2025	GIVĒON	source

=== 2026 ===
Date	Artists	NPR article
January 5, 2026	Daniel Caesar	source
January 7, 2026	Great Grandpa	source
January 9, 2026	Coco Jones	source
January 12, 2026	Destin Conrad	source
January 14, 2026	From the Top	source
January 16, 2026	John Fogerty	source
January 20, 2026	Guitarricadelafuente	source
January 22, 2026	Yeule	source
January 26, 2026	Sally Baby's Silver Dollars	source
January 28, 2026	FORAGER	source
January 30, 2026	Ollella	source
February 3, 2026	Miguel	source
February 5, 2026	John P. Kee and New Life	source
February 10, 2026	Geese	source
February 12, 2026	Sarah McLachlan	source
February 16, 2026	Jill Scott	source
February 18, 2026	Ganavya	source
February 20, 2026	FLO	source
February 24, 2026	Immanuel Wilkins	source
February 27, 2026	Buddy Guy	source
March 3, 2026	De La Soul	source
March 5, 2026	Cast of the Broadway musical Maybe Happy Ending (Note: Featuring Darren Criss, Helen J. Shen, Dez Duron, and Marcus Choi.)	source
March 12, 2026	Madi Diaz	source
March 16, 2026	Tiana Major9	source
March 19, 2026	Caamp	source
March 23, 2026	Kronos Quartet	source
March 25, 2026	Mumford & Sons	source
March 27, 2026	Militarie Gun	source
April 2, 2026	Bush	source
April 7, 2026	Aterciopelados	source
April 9, 2026	Lecrae	source
April 14, 2026	Mannequin Pussy	source
April 17, 2026	Gwenifer Raymond	source
April 21, 2026	Noah Kahan	source
April 23, 2026	Amaia	source
April 27, 2026	Infinity Song	source
April 30, 2026	Milo J	source
May 6, 2026	Cast of the Broadway musical Ragtime (Note: Featuring Joshua Henry, Caissie Levy, Brandon Uranowitz, Colin Donnell, Nichelle Lewis, and Ben Levi Ross.)	source
May 8, 2026	Kes the Band	source
May 11, 2026	JADE	source
May 13, 2026	Foo Fighters	source
May 15, 2026	Don Was and the Pan-Detroit Ensemble	source
May 18, 2026	Vince Gill	source
May 22, 2026	Laurie Anderson	source
May 26, 2026	Annahstasia	source
May 28, 2026	Cure for Paranoia	source
June 2, 2026	Floetry	source
June 4, 2026	GENA (Karriem Riggins and Liv.e)	source
June 8, 2026	Ayra Starr	source
June 10, 2026	Joe	source
June 12, 2026	The Paradox	source
June 16, 2026	Eve	source
June 18, 2026	8Ball & MJG	source
June 23, 2026	Fred Hammond	source
June 25, 2026	Shaboozey	source
June 29, 2026	Bow Wow	source
July 9, 2026	redveil	source
July 13, 2026	Flea and the Honora Band	source
July 15, 2026	Napalm Death	source
July 21, 2026	Vince Staples	source
July 23, 2026	The War and Treaty	source
July 28, 2026	Armand Hammer	source
July 30, 2026	Renée Fleming & Béla Fleck	source
August 4, 2026	Charlie Puth	source
August 11, 2026	Death Cab for Cutie	source
August 13, 2026	Audrey Hobert	source
August 20, 2026	"Weird Al" Yankovic	source
August 25, 2026	Isaiah Rashad	source
August 27, 2026	E.U.	source
September 1, 2026	Mon Rovîa	source
September 3, 2026	Mac Ayres	source
September 8, 2026	Ratboys	source
September 10, 2026	Tori Kelly	source
September 15, 2026	Mon Laferte	source
September 17, 2026	Los Mirlos	source
September 22, 2026	YEИDRY	source
September 24, 2026	Alex Ferreira	source
September 29, 2026	Melissa Aldana and Gonzalo Rubalcaba	source
October 1, 2026	Panteón Rococó	source
October 6, 2026	Tim Bernardes	source
October 8, 2026	Los Texmaniacs	source
October 13, 2026	Draco Rosa	source
October 15, 2026	Los Tigres del Norte	source
October 19, 2026	Cardi B	source
October 23, 2026	Brìghde Chaimbeul	source
October 27, 2026	CMAT	source
October 30, 2026	Richard O'Brien's The Rocky Horror Show	source
November 2, 2026	Jungle	source
November 5, 2026	Fat Joe	source
November 12, 2026	Robyn	source
