= Alisa Amador =

2022 NPR Tiny Desk Contest winner

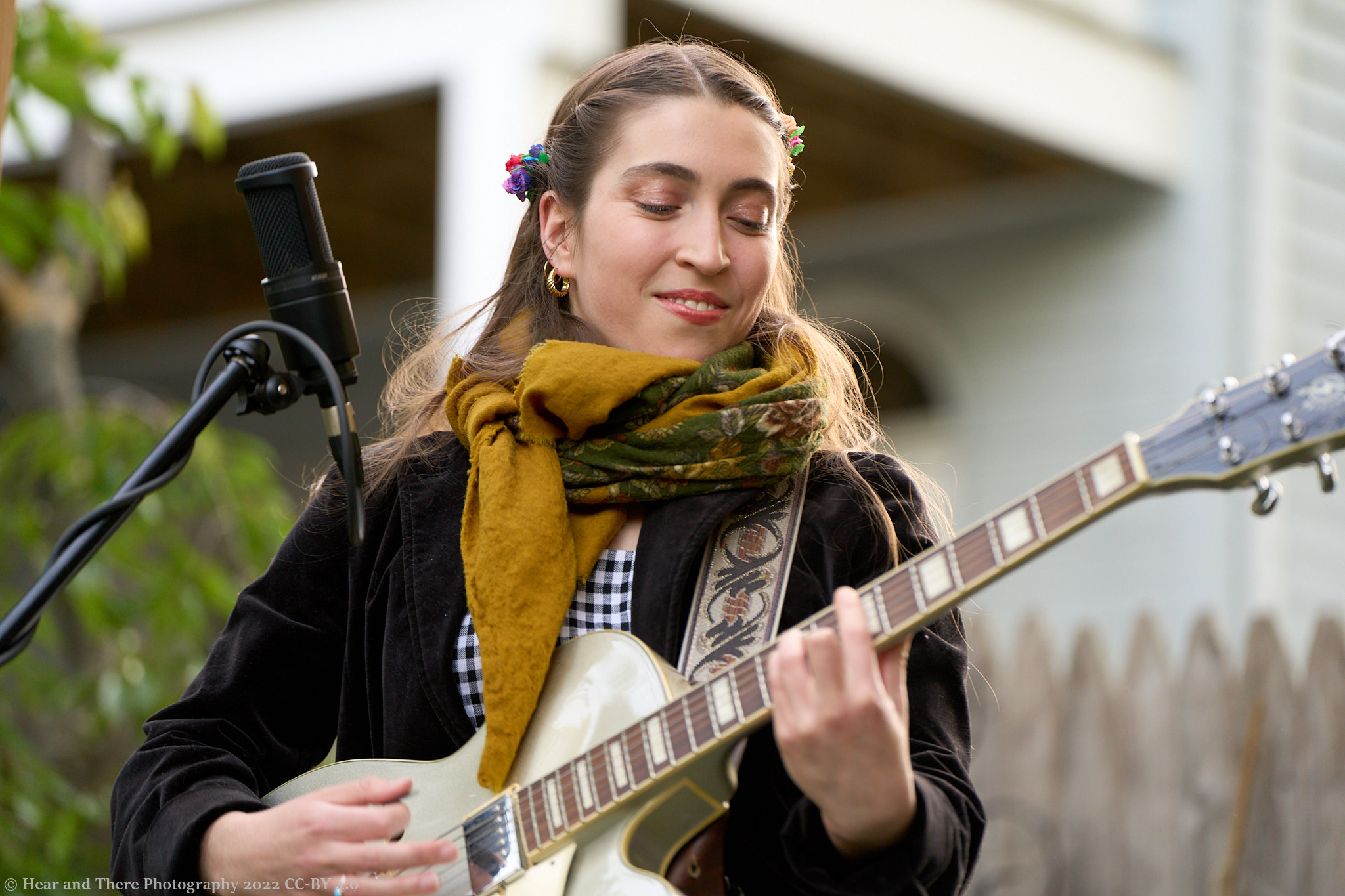
Amador playing a hometown show in 2022.

Alisa Amador is a jazz, funk, and alternative folk musician.

In 2022, she won NPR Music’s Tiny Desk Contest with “Milonga Accidental”, the first Spanish language song to win the contest.

== Early life ==
Amador was raised in Cambridge, MA. Her parents allowed her and her twin brother to speak only Spanish at home so they could maintain connection to their culture and communicate with family. Her family has roots in Puerto Rico, Argentina, and New Mexico.

== Music career ==
=== Origin ===
Amador is the daughter of Latin folk musicians, Rosi and Brian Amador of the band, Sol y Canto. At age five, she began performing as the band's backup singer on tour. She studied abroad in Argentina. In 2018, she graduated from Bates College with a Bachelor of Arts degree.

=== 2018-2021 work ===
In 2018, Amador submitted to NPR’s Tiny Desk Contest for the first time. WBUR stated, "It was clear from the young singer’s deft musicianship that she was an artist to watch."

In 2019, Amador performed at the Cambridge Arts Council River Festival and at Club Passim's 60th anniversary celebration at the Shubert Theatre in Boston. She regularly played gigs at Club Passim. She was featured in WGBH's series, "Bands You Should Know".

In 2020, she won an Iguana Music Fund grant to help buy recording equipment. She released the tracks “Red Balloon” and “Milonga Accidental". She performed for the benefit livestream concert, All In For Chelsea.

In 2021, she released “Timing", ahead of her album release, Narratives. Grateful Web complimented Amador's talent on Narratives for "sparking connection across both listeners and musical styles". She was chosen by Tiny Desk as one of their favorite 2021 entries.

=== Tiny Desk win ===
In 2022, Amador submitted to Tiny Desk for the fifth time and was chosen as the national winner. Bob Boilen called her, "a powerful voice whose tender performance commands attention and fosters connection." In an interview with Sound of Boston, Amador recalls how she got the news while recording in Nashville: “I was going through press interviews as I was recording songs with Emily and Lizzy and the band. At first [the news] was secret, like super secret, and then it went out to the entire country that I had won, all in that one week we were recording.”

As her prize, Amador flew to Washington D.C. to perform her Tiny Desk show. It was the first show to be recorded in the original NPR Tiny Desk studio at Boilen's desk in two years.

Afterwards, Amador performed on the Tiny Desk Contest On The Road national tour at WAMU, KEXP, WABE, LAist/KPCC, and WFUV.

She considered quitting music right before she won Tiny Desk.

=== 2022-present ===
Amador was nominated for New Artist of the Year and won Folk Artist of the Year at the 2022 Boston Music Awards. In fall of that year, Amador was awarded a grant for a forthcoming album from the nonprofit Salt Lick Incubator. In May 2023, Amador opened Boston Calling Music Festival, performing songs in both Spanish and English. Boston Magazine wrote that her set was one of the best moments of the weekend.

== Discography ==
=== Studio albums ===
List of albums, with release date and label shown
Title	Details
Multitudes	To be released: June 7, 2024; Label: Thirty Tigers; Format: Digital download, streaming, CD, vinyl

=== Extended plays ===
List of extended plays, with release date and label shown
Title	Details
Red Balloon / Milonga Accidental	Released: December 11, 2020; Label: Self-released; Format: Digital download
Narratives	Released: September 17, 2021; Label: Self-released; Format: Digital download

=== Singles ===
List of singles, showing year released and album name
Title	Year	Album
"Timing"	2021	Narratives
"Slow Down"	2021	Narratives
"Together"	2021	Narratives
"River" (Live from Salt Lick Sessions)	2022	non-album single
"Woke Up Today"	2023	Multitudes
"Quedar"	2023	Multitudes
"I Need to Believe" (featuring Quinn Christopherson)	2024	Multitudes
