= Gracie and Rachel =

Piano-violin chamber pop duo, active from 2014

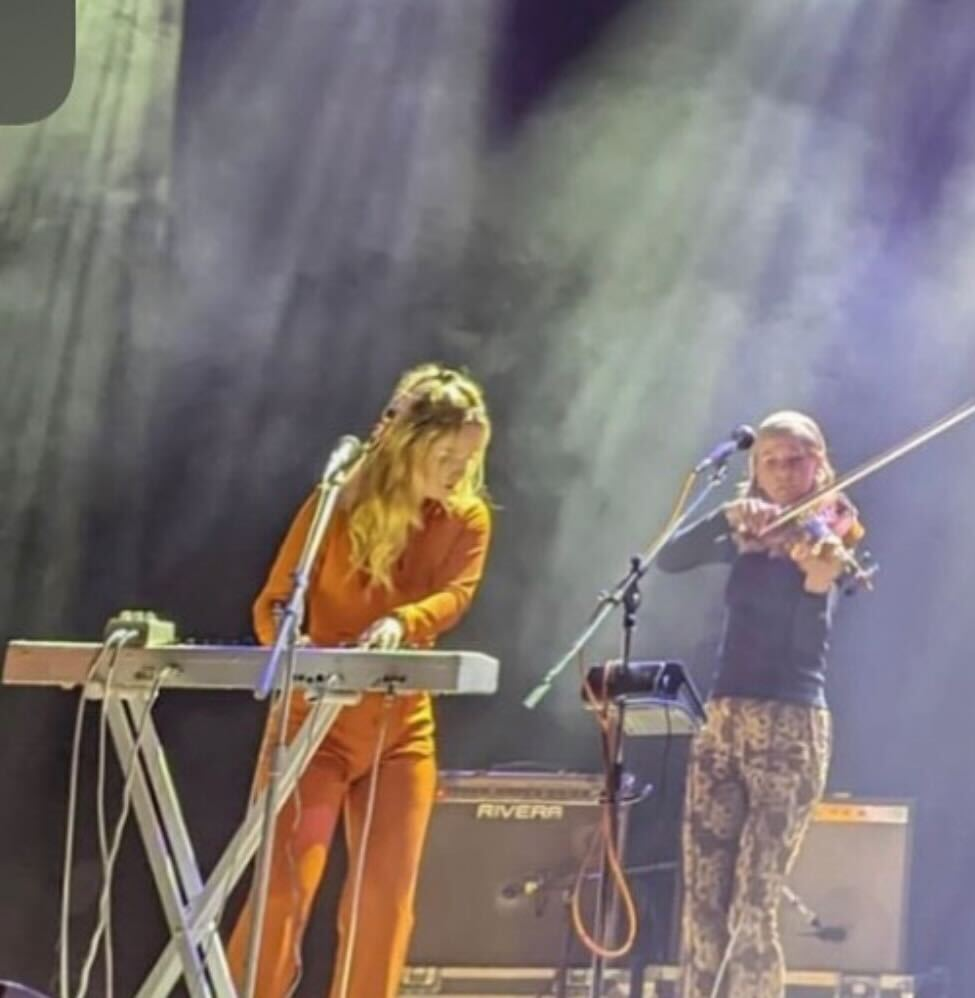
- Gracie and Rachel performing at State Theatre of Ithaca on November 8, 2022

Background information
- Origin: Berkeley, CA
- Genre: chamber pop
- Years active: 2014 – present
- Labels: Righteous Babe Records; United For Opportunity
- Members: Gracie Coates; Rachel Ruggles
- Website: gracieandrachel.com

Gracie and Rachel is a chamber pop piano-violin duo composed of singer-keyboardist Gracie Coates and violinist Rachel Ruggles, high school friends from Berkeley, California based in Brooklyn, New York.

== Background ==
Coates and Ruggles met at Berkeley High School in dance class when they were assigned to make a song for the class’s dance show. Coates went on to study at Berklee College of Music and Ruggles at Jacobs School of Music at Indiana University, but they continued to rehearse together over video calls, creating music that combined Coates' pop songwriting with Ruggles’ classical training, before they decided to move to Brooklyn to play music together.

== Career ==
The duo recorded their debut album in their Bushwick loft where they also live together. Their single "Tiptoe" premiered on WNYC Soundcheck. They released several black and white videos to tease the release of their album: "Go", "Tiptoe" premiering on Baeble Music, "(Un)comfortable" premiering on Impose Magazine, and "It’s Time" premiering on Earbuddy. The video for "Only A Child" premiered on NPR Music where Bob Boilen praised the "terrific tension in the sound, an underpinning of mystery set against a baroque, but modern, pop foreground." The song was later chosen as one of NPR Music’s 100 Best Songs of 2017.

Gracie and Rachel’s self-titled debut album was teased with a full-album stream on The Big Takeover before its release on June 23, 2017 via United For Opportunity. They were voted by All Songs Considered listeners as #4 of their favorite new artists of 2017. The album was chosen as one of Bob Boilen’s top 10 albums of 2017 on NPR Music and one of the 25 best of 2017 by the Echoes radio program.

Gracie and Rachel has also released covers of "Gucci Gucci" by fellow Bay Area artist Kreayshawn and "Elastic Heart" by Sia.

They have performed live sessions at NPR's Tiny Desk Concerts and Paste Magazine.

In early October 2018, in response to Dr. Christine Blasey Ford’s testimony against Judge Brett Kavanaugh, Gracie and Rachel released a song and video titled “HER” that went viral on Facebook and was spotlighted on Channel 12 News Brooklyn.

In September 2020, the duo released its sophomore album, Hello Weakness You Make Me Strong, on Ani DiFranco’s Righteous Babe Records, which reached #2 on Echoes' Top 25 Albums Released in September 2020. The single “Ideas” was featured on NPR’s All Songs Considered, the music video single “Trust” was spotlighted on American Songwriter, and the music video single “Underneath” was highlighted on Refinery29 and Flaunt Magazine. The music focuses on facing vulnerability and using it to find strength, and it has been called “great advice” by NPR Music’s Bob Boilen.

After nine years of living and working together in Brooklyn, Coates moved to upstate New York. Long distance collaboration resulted in a new dynamic for the duo which they explored in their 2023 EP Nowhere Now Here, which focuses on their continuing connection despite living apart, giving "another element to their duality" (WNYC).

== Style ==
Gracie and Rachel describe their sound as "orchestral pop." They perform live as a duo. Duality is an integral part of their style, reflected in their sound through the interplay between Coates' singer-songwriter background and Ruggles' classical training and in the clothing they wore during their first two album cycles, with Coates in white and Ruggles in black. All photoshoots and music videos for their debut album are also in black and white. For the release of their 2023 EP Nowhere Now Here they began wearing clothing in a wider array of colors. Their lyrics are autobiographical and reference themes of anxiety, censorship, and empowerment.

== Discography ==
- If We Could, Would We (2026) (Righteous Babe Records)
- Nowhere Now Here EP (2023) (Righteous Babe Records)
- a whisper becomes a shout EP (2021) (Righteous Babe Records)
- Hello Weakness, You Make Me Strong: The Remixes EP (2021) (Righteous Babe Records)
- Hello Weakness, You Make Me Strong (2020) (Righteous Babe Records)
- Gracie and Rachel (2017) (United For Opportunity)
