= Quinn Christopherson =

2019 NPR Tiny Desk Contest winner

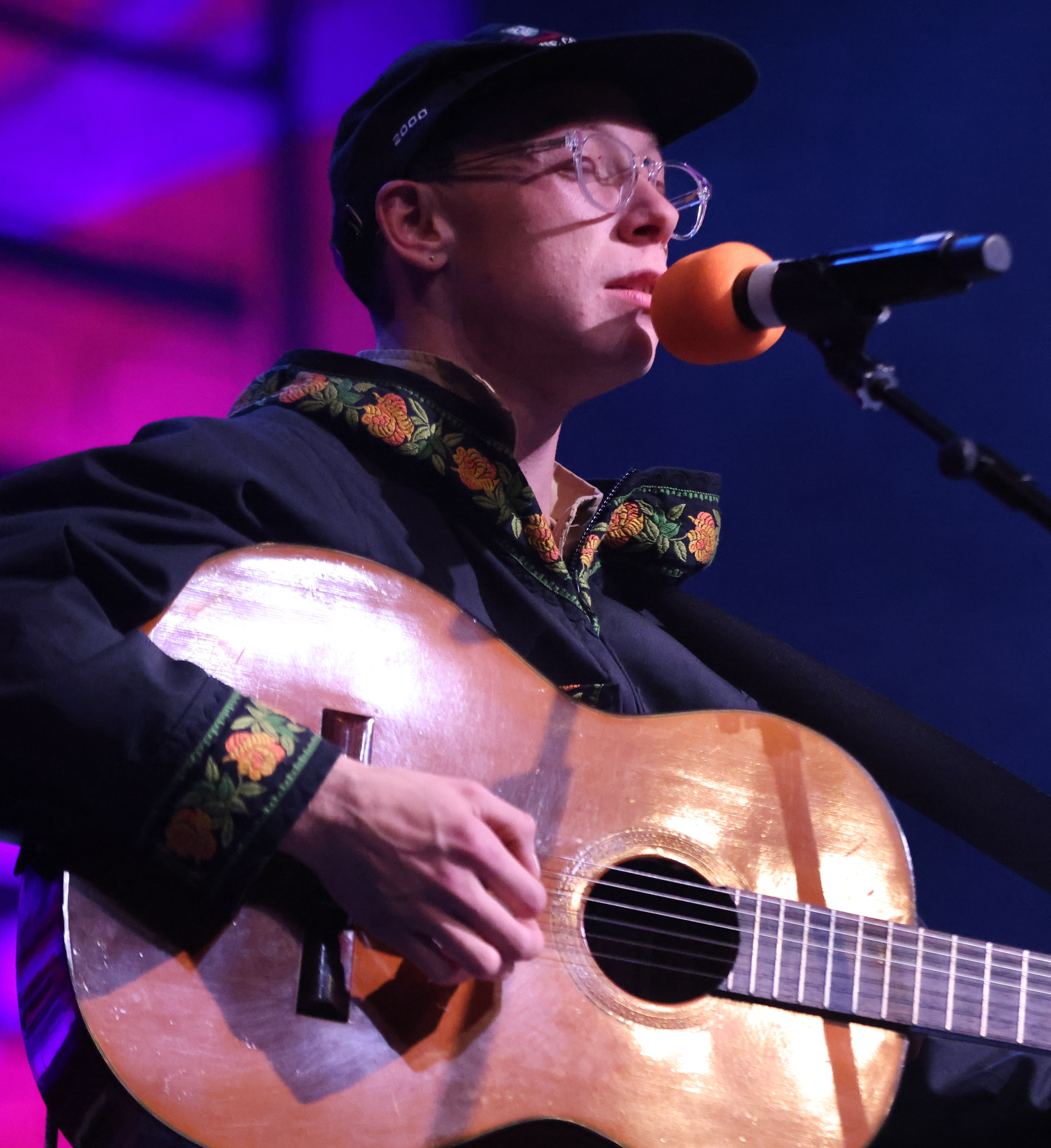
- Christopherson performing at Áak'w Rock music festival, 2023.

Background information
- Origin: Anchorage, Alaska (Athabaskan and Inupiaq)
- Genres: Indie rock, singer-songwriter
- Website: https://quinnchristopherson.com/

Quinn Christopherson is an American singer-songwriter of Alaskan Native heritage. He is best known for his song, "Erase Me," which describes his experience with male privilege as a transgender man. The song won NPR's 2019 Tiny Desk Contest, out of over 6,000 entries.

In 2020's ACT for Gender Identity: The Comprehensive Guide, Alex Stitt suggested that mental health specialists listen to "Erase Me" to better understand FTM transitions, claiming Christopherson's "beautifully visceral voice captures how strangling social erasure and newfound male privilege can be."

== Early life ==
Christopherson was born and raised in Anchorage, Alaska. He is Athabaskan through his mother and Iñupiat through his mother and father. Christopherson grew up with his mother's Athabaskan family. His maternal grandmother was a storyteller from Tazlina, Alaska who later moved to Anchorage.

== Career ==
In his youth, Christopherson helped his father "DJ weddings all over Alaska."

When he was 20 years old, his father bought him a guitar, after which he began songwriting.

In 2018, Christopherson was recognized by NPR for his entry to the Tiny Desk Contest, which was won by Naia Izumi. His folk song entry, "Mary Alee," is a tribute to his late grandmother. He recorded the song's music video on Westchester Lagoon while it was frozen. He credits his grandmother's positivity and acceptance of his gender transition at age 25 as being influential in his life. He recalled moments with his grandmother in multiple interviews, including visiting each day to sing to her while she played solitaire. During those visits, he described hearing her recount stories about family members, old friends, and his own upbringing.

In 2019, Christopherson won NPR's Tiny Desk Contest. His submission, "Erase Me," explores his experience as a transgender man, specifically his relationship with male privilege following his transition. He describes decades of low self-esteem caused by dysphoria as well as sexism, such as others interrupting him, second-guessing his opinions, and disbelieving his ambitions; these events stopped occurring after Christopherson's transition to male. The song's title refers to the concept of passing, which Christopherson has stated "feels like...being rewarded for [his] own erasure."

In 2019, he recorded a live music video for "Erase Me" accompanied by his bandmate, Nick Carpenter, at the Anchorage Museum in front of a painting of Denali. NPR described the video as a "work of art."

American singer-songwriter Lucy Dacus praised his song as complex and captivating. "Erase Me" was one of over 6,000 entries in 2019. Christopherson will perform a Tiny Desk Concert and go on tour with NPR Music.

In 2025, Christopherson participated in Pan-ArcticVision in Iqaluit, Nunavut, Canada.

== Personal life ==
Quinn began transitioning to male in 2017 at the age of 25, and he reflects his experiences in his music. Due to the experiences of his grandmother, Christopherson does not drink alcohol.

== Discography ==
=== Albums ===
- Write Your Name in Pink (2022)

=== Singles ===
- "Mary Alee" (2018)
- "Erase Me" (2019)
- "Raedeen" (2019)
