= Neffy =

Singer-songwriter who won the 2021 NPR Tiny Desk Contest

Mecca Russell, known professionally as Neffy, is a singer-songwriter from Arlington, Virginia.

In 2021, she won the NPR Tiny Desk Contest.

== Career ==
Neffy was a musical child who sang frequently. She has described her father as the “epitome of a music encyclopedia" who taught her about R&B and soul. At age 12, Neffy's mother gave her her first guitar, which she taught herself to play. At age 13, she wrote her first song. She sang in a choir in high school which was called, "Magicals".

From 2015 to 2020, she attended the Eugene Lang College of Liberal Arts at The New School.

Before the COVID-19 pandemic, Neffy performed over 100 concerts on the East Coast.

In 2020, she won a grant from Emergent Seed, a DC arts organization, to support her music.

=== NPR Tiny Desk Contest ===
In 2021, Neffy submitted a video of her playing her original song "Wait Up," to the NPR Tiny Desk Contest. Tiny Desk creator, Bob Boilen, said, “Neffy’s song stood out amongst the thousands of 2021 Tiny Desk Contest entries as a universal cry to break free of constraints and celebrate nature's beauty. With an acoustic guitar and that uplifting voice, Neffy wowed our judges.” The judging panel consisted of Boilen, Tobe Nwigwe, Phoebe Bridgers, and four other judges. Neffy previously entered the Tiny Desk Contest in 2018 and 2020.

Neffy faced unique challenges winning the contest during the first two years of the COVID-19 pandemic. She was able to film an NPR Tiny Desk set, but with only the All Songs Considered production team present as an audience. She has shared that the pandemic has been difficult for independent artists. In 2022, she released the song, “I Lost My Nerve” about these struggles.

== Discography ==
Albums
Title	Year	Source
I Don't Miss You	2020	

Singles
Title	Year	Source
“Wait Up”	2021	
“I Lost My Nerve”	2022	
