= Little Moon =

American band

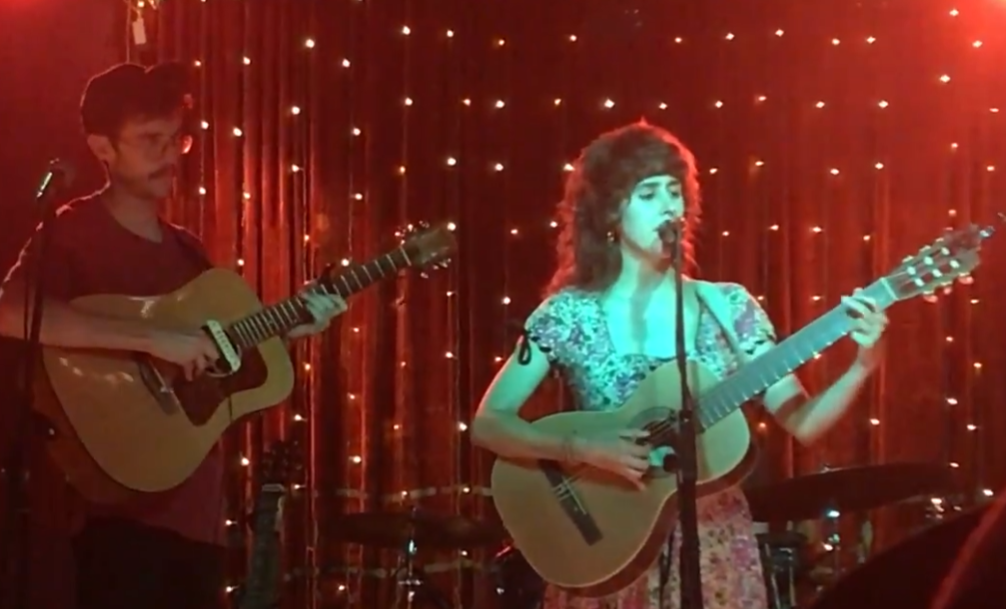
- Emma and Nate in concert in 2021

Background information
- Origin: Springville, Utah
- Genres: indie folk
- Years active: 2020–present
- Label: Joyful Noise Recordings
- Members: Emma Hardyman; Nathan Hardyman; Bly Wallentine; Bridget Jackson; Chris Shemwell; Grace Johnson

Little Moon is an American indie folk rock band from Springville, Utah, and formerly a project of lead vocalist, singer-songwriter Emma Hardyman. Their first album, Unphased, was released in 2020. The band won the Tiny Desk Contest in 2023.

== Members ==
The band consists of Emma Hardyman on lead vocals and guitar with her husband, Nathan Hardyman on bass and guitar, Bly Wallentine on keyboard and other instruments, Bridget Jackson on harp, Chris Shemwell on drums, and Grace Johnson on electric guitar and keyboard. "Little Moon" was, until at least 2020, a stage name for Emma. Bly Wallentine encouraged Emma to make her act into a band, which debuted on July 29, 2021. By 2022, Little Moon referred to the band.

== Unphased ==
Little Moon released their first album, Unphased, in 2020. It contains "Ballad of a Moon Child III," which was featured in the 2020 Tiny Desk Concert's "best of" roundup. Emma wrote that "nyctophila" (a prominent word in the song's lyrics) meant finding comfort in darkness. Mindy Gledhill opened the album release concert, which featured 12 musicians in Little Moon. Writing for Salt Lake City Weekly, Erin Moore described how the band's "folk-infused" music reminded her of Joanna Newsom.

== Tiny Desk Concert ==
Little Moon submitted songs to the Tiny Desk Concert in 2020, 2021, 2022 and 2023. Emma said that applying to Tiny Desk became a ritual for the band. They won the NPR Tiny Desk Concert in 2023 for the song "Wonder Eye." Emma said that the inspiration for the song came to her when she and her husband were visiting her mother-in-law in hospice care. After sketching out the song, she asked Nathan to compose the lyrics. Both were raised in the Church of Jesus Christ of Latter-day Saints and they left the church over the pandemic. Emma said that the death of a loved one helped them realize they are constantly mourning all kinds of deaths, and that the song shows how "accepting the mysterious, shadowy nature of death can deepen one's sense of humanity and soften the ways we see ourselves and each other." Max Roth at Fox News described the song as starting with folk-rock and shifting into "anthemic rock" with "intimate and other-worldly" singing. Palak Jayswal noticed the songs has similarities to hymns. As winners of the Tiny Desk Concert, they toured in Los Angeles, San Francisco, Seattle, Atlanta, Philadelphia, Brooklyn, Chicago, and Houston in 2023. Before their Tiny Desk tour, they opened for Lord Huron and headlined for Fork Fest in June 2023.

== Genre and critical reception ==
The band's music contains elements of folk, pop and indie rock. Reviewing one of the concerts from their Tiny Desk Concert tour, Roni Birchack called their music "mesmerizing and fantastical folk music", the show "flawless", and complimented their banter. At Provo Music Magazine, Zach Collier described them as a "quirky, authentic folk act".

== Dear Divine ==
Little Moon released their second album, Dear Divine, in October 2024. It contains "Wonder Eye" and 11 other songs, including re-recorded versions of "We Fall in Our Sleep" and "Kind, Kind Home" from the Tiny Desk concert.

== Discography ==
Albums

- Unphased (2020)
- Dear Divine (2024)
