= Gaelynn Lea =

American violinist and disability advocate (born 1984)

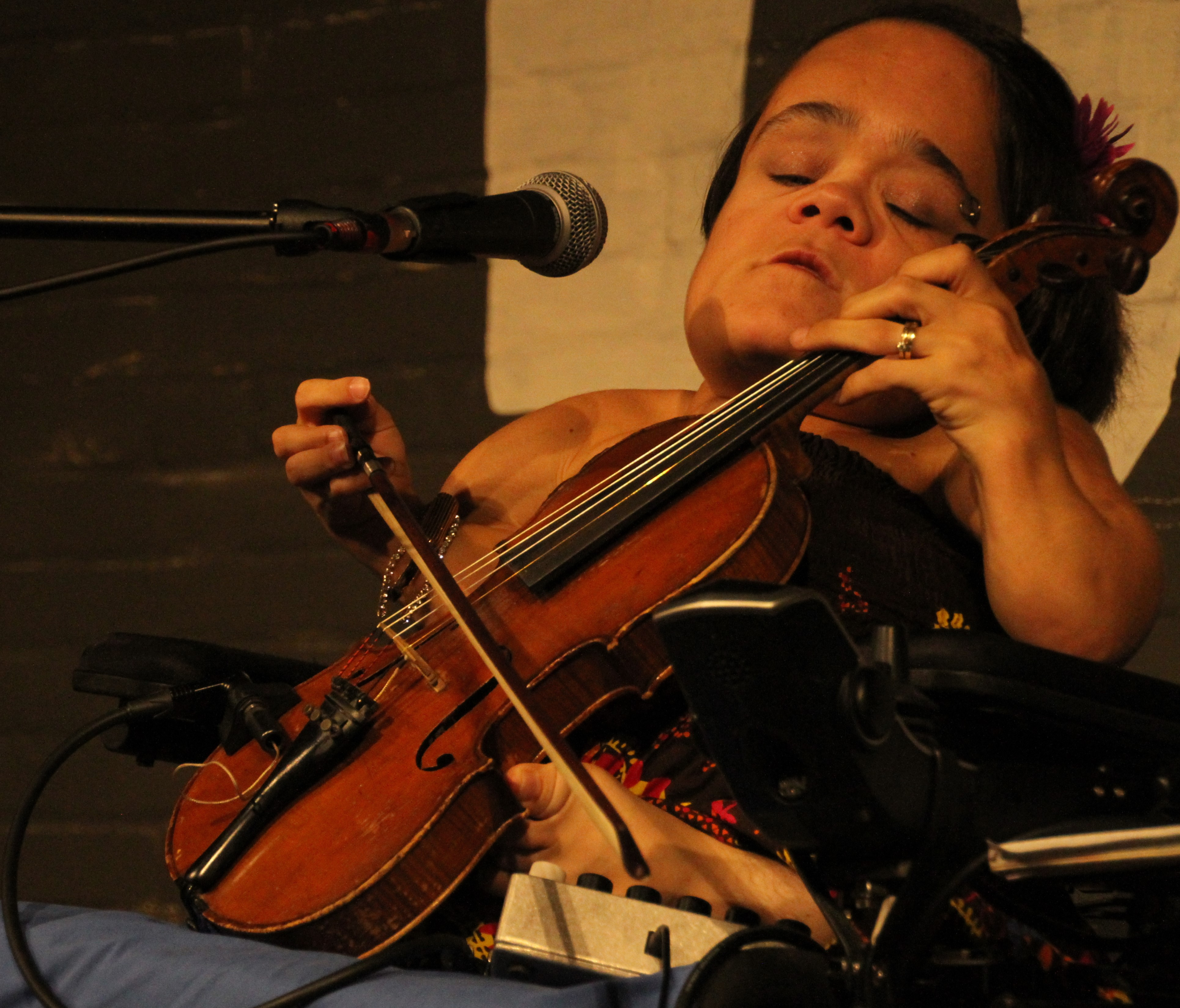
- Gaelynn Lea in 2017

Background information
- Born: January 21, 1984 (age 42); Duluth, Minnesota
- Genres: Folk, bluegrass, Celtic, experimental
- Instruments: Violin, vocals
- Website: www.violinscratches.com

Gaelynn Lea Tressler (born January 21, 1984) is an American folk musician and disability advocate from Duluth, Minnesota. She won NPR's 2016 Tiny Desk Contest.

== Early life and education ==
Gaelynn Lea was born with osteogenesis imperfecta, a genetic condition that causes complications in the development of bones and limbs. Lea became impassioned by classical music from an early age, and in fourth grade a teacher took notice and encouraged Lea to pursue music after she had the class's only perfect score on a music listening test. Lea developed a technique for violin which involved holding the bow "like a bassist" with the body of the instrument placed in front of her, like a cello, and attached to her foot so it wouldn't slip when she played. Her parents also owned and operated a dinner theater while Lea was growing up, and she would often usher and do lighting for productions.

Lea attended Macalester College, where she majored in political science; prior to her music career, she had planned to pursue a career as a lawyer and disability rights advocate.

== Career ==
Lea's early career collaborations included the alternative folk music duo The Murder of Crows with Alan Sparhawk, an "atmospheric, improvisational project" they began in 2011. Lea was also the violinist/vocalist of the Scandinavian folk/rock band Snöbarn, which released its first and only album in 2013. The album was titled, Hand by Hand. Additionally, Lea has played with Charlie Parr and Billy McLaughlin.

Lea gained exposure after winning NPR's 2016 Tiny Desk Contest. Her song and performance for "Someday We'll Linger in the Sun" was selected over six thousand other submissions by a committee that included Dan Auerbach of the Black Keys, Jess Wolfe of Lucius, Son Lux and NPR staff. Auerbach's citation read: "This song starts off with the sound of 20 old floorboards groaning and creaking in unison and then Karen Dalton and Joanna Newsom melt together in the form of Gaelynn Lea and set about absolutely obliterating your heart."

In 2022, Lea made her Broadway debut as the composer of original music for the revival of Macbeth, directed by Sam Gold at the Longacre Theatre.

In 2024, Lea performed in a video that aired during the 2024 Summer Paralympics closing ceremony.

In 2026, Lea published a memoir, titled It Wasn't Meant to Be Perfect.

== Musical style and influences ==
Lea possesses a mezzo-soprano voice, which has been characterized by Denny Dyroff of the Unionville Times as "ethereal". Lea's style is rooted in classical, Celtic and traditional folk music. With the use of looping pedals Lea layers multiple orchestrated parts from a miked violin while she sings. Due to her physical stature she plays violin in the style of a cellist, which creates a unique sound: in this stance, her bow strikes the lower strings first (as they do on a cello), in contrast to most violinists for whom the bow strikes the highest string first.

Reviewing her performance at the 2017 Folk Alliance Conference for Paste Magazine, Geoffrey Himes described Lea's "Watch the World Unfold" as the "most moving song" he heard at the conference: "The song draws its power from the tension between a young person's optimistic plans and the obstacles that life throws in the way of those hopes, a conflict reinforced by the paradox of the sunny, childlike vocal melody and the cloudy, ominous swirl of violin harmony."

Writing for The Kansas City Star, Bill Brownlee contrasted Lea's musical style with what Brownlee called the "fussy forms of indie-rock" often praised by NPR All Songs Considered's hosts, Bob Boilen and Robin Hilton: "Many listeners who object to the tastemakers' genteel predilections forgave the men after they discovered plaintive folk artist Gaelynn Lea last year...Filmed on a friend's iPhone, the video of Lea's rendition of her memorable original song 'Someday We'll Linger in the Sun' captures her otherworldly voice and ethereal fiddle playing."

== Advocacy ==
Lea was a guest speaker at Yale University for a TedxTalk to discuss sexuality, the obstacles for people with disabilities, and the use of art as a vessel to overcome physical limitations. She also speaks on accessibility in the music industry.

== Personal life ==
Around 2014 Lea married Paul Tressler, with whom she had been in a relationship since around 2007. Tressler acts as Lea's tour manager.

== Discography ==
=== Solo albums ===
- All the Roads that Lead Us Home (2015)
- Deepest Darkness, Brightest Dawn (2016)
- Learning How to Stay (2018)
- The Living Room Sessions (2020)

=== Singles ===
- "Someday We'll Linger in the Sun" (2016)
- "All Changing Tides" (2017)

=== Extended plays ===
- The Songs We Sing Along the Way (2016)

=== The Murder of Crows ===
- Imperfecta (2012)

=== Snöbarn ===
- Hand by Hand (2013)

=== The Getarounds ===
- The Getarounds Live EP (2013)
