= Mac Ayres =

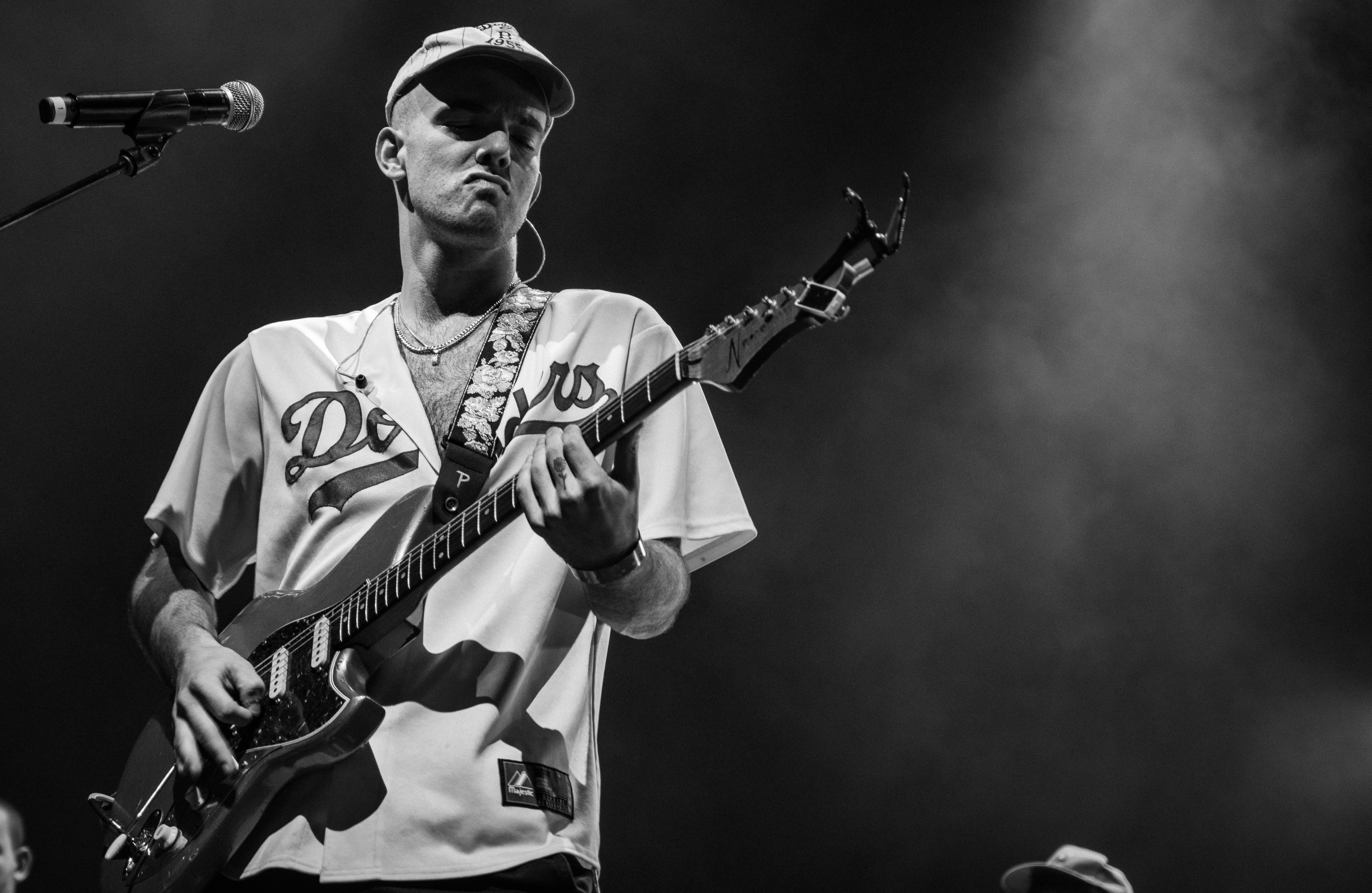
- Ayres performing in 2019

Background information
- Born: December 6, 1996 (age 29); Sea Cliff, New York, U.S.
- Genres: R&B; soul; funk; jazz fusion; Alternative R&B; vaporwave
- Occupations: Singer-songwriter; producer; multi-instrumentalist
- Instruments: Vocals, piano, guitar, acoustic bass, electric bass
- Years active: 2016-present
- Label: Dixon Court Records
- Website: macayres.co

Maclean Daniel Ayres, better known as Mac Ayres, is an American R&B singer-songwriter, producer, and multi-instrumentalist.

== Biography ==
Ayres grew up in Sea Cliff, New York, and graduated from North Shore High School. He sang in various choral groups as a child, including the Metropolitan Youth Orchestra and the North Shore High School Madrigals. He became friends with his drummer, Chris Anderson, during high school and they began playing together at age 15. He attended the Berklee College of Music in Boston, Massachusetts, from 2014 to 2017 before dropping out to work on his Drive Slow EP. He shared during his piano tour in Chicago (April 8, 2025) that he's been in a relationship since 2016.

== Music career ==
Ayres released his debut EP entitled I Know Enough in 2016 via SoundCloud. The EP has since been mostly deleted, with the song "Wrong" being the remaining song on the SoundCloud playlist. This was followed a year later by his second EP Drive Slow in 2017. He released his full-length debut album, Something to Feel, in 2018. Ayres' second full-length album, Juicebox, was released in 2019. His second EP Magic 8Ball was released on January 8, 2021. Two years later, on March 16, 2023, his third album Comfortable Enough was released.

In November 2024, Mac Ayres released Cloudy, a compilation of loose tracks he released on SoundCloud from 2016 to 2019.

=== Musical influences ===
In an interview with music blog EarToTheGround Music, Ayres mentioned among his musical influences "Teddy Pendergrass, most of Motown, and especially the iconic Stevie Wonder". His defining artist was D'Angelo, whose album Voodoo "felt like what music is supposed to be to me," according to Ayres.

== Discography ==
Studio albums

- Something to Feel (2018)
- Juicebox (2019)
- Comfortable Enough (2023)

EPs

- Drive Slow (2017)
- Magic 8Ball (2021)

Compilation albums

- Cloudy (2024)
