= Gina Chavez =

Latin singer-songwriter

- Born: May 24, 1982 (age 44)
- Genres: Pop rock; Latin rock; Música latina
- Occupation: Singer-songwriter
- Instruments: vocal, guitar, charango
- Years active: 2001–present
- Label: CD Baby
- Website: Official website

Gina Chavez (born May 24, 1982) is an American bilingual Latin-folk singer and songwriter who has been performing since 2004, releasing her first recording in 2007. Chavez's parents are of Mexican and Swiss-German descent. Chavez's father, Gene Chavez, is a second generation Mexican-American from the south side of San Antonio, Texas. Chavez holds a unique style of mixing the content of her music and visuals and is an eight-time Austin Music Award winner. She was named Austin Musician of the Year in 2015. A review by Sonicbids describes the style in her songs containing traversings of cumbia, bossa nova, vintage pop, reggaeton, and folk combined with dynamic vocals and sharp social commentary. Chavez does not work alone, she is teamed with a band of six members. Her recent major album is titled Up.Rooted, and the work that she has compiled together, has earned her various awards, such as Best Latin Band.

== Career ==
Chavez was born in Austin, Texas. She began songwriting and performing at the University of Texas at Austin at the age of 18. Growing up, Chavez's musical interests included Lyle Lovett, Little Richard, and Michael Jackson. She did not grow up listening to Latino music. It wasn't until her first year of college when she began writing music while studying in Buenos Aires, Argentina that she discovered a love for folk music and dance. Ever since her time in Argentina, Chavez has incorporated Spanish lyrics as well as rhythms of Latin into her music. Her genre is mainly considered Latin-folk. Chavez's vocal styling ranges from yearning to sensual to wailing.

On January 1, 2007, Chavez released her debut solo independent album, Hanging Spoons. On December 6, 2014, Chavez released Gina Chavez Live at the Music Club under The Good Music Club that contained five total tracks. Chavez released her first independent studio album, Up.Rooted, on February 11, 2016, online to iTunes, Amazon, Spotify, with physical copies available on CD Baby.

Chavez raised the money to record her first studio album via Kickstarter and doubled her goal by raising $20,000. Chavez is continuing to use Kickstarter to raise funds in hopes for the creation of her second studio album. This album takes on cumbia, down tempo, swing, bossa nova, and alternative rock sounds.

Chavez highly promoted her single Siete-D which takes a stand against gang violence in Central America was published on her YouTube channel March 8, 2016. The visual was filmed in El Salvador in October 2015.

=== Present ===
As of April 2016, Chavez is touring solo, and with her full six-person band.

== Personal life ==
She's made her presence known with her work in El Salvador, being named one of 11 southern iconic women who have left a beautiful footprint across the south" by Southern Living and Olay. Her work in El Salvador continues to make a worldwide difference outside of music. In an interview with The Austin Chronicle, Chavez is described as "no stranger to the benefit rounds. She routinely puts on productions of her own to support the nonprofit she started after an eight-month mission trip to El Salvador."

The Austin native has made such an impact and influence in the music scene that in 2015, Austin, Texas mayor, Steve Adler, announced that April 2 is officially known as "Gina Chavez Day."

While living in El Salvador in 2009, Chavez and her wife Jodi, who also acts as her booking agent, spent eight months educating teenage girls who were surrounded by poverty in gang-dominated barrios.

== Discography ==
- Hanging Spoons (Album; 2007)
- Gina Chavez, Live at the Good Music Club (Live EP; 2014)
- Up.Rooted (Album; 2014) Voted "Austin Album of the Year"
- In-a-Gadda-da-Vida (Album)

== Awards ==
- 2013 & 2018 Best Austin Musician (Female vocalist)
- 2014-2019 Best Performing Bands (Latin)
- 2014 Industry Awards - AMP Esme Barrera Award for Music Activism and Education
- 2014 Best Musician of the Year
- 2013 Best Performing Bands (Best Latin Rock Act)(Best Latin Traditional Act)
- 2012 Best Performing Bands (Best Latin Traditional Act)
