= Tufan Derince =

- Born: 1987 (age 37–38); Diyarbakır, Turkey
- Origin: Kurds
- Genres: Kurdish music
- Years active: 2013–present

Tufan Derince (born 1987) is a Kurdish folk musician. He is currently based in Rotterdam in the Netherlands.

== Biografie ==
Tufan Derince was born in 1987 and began playing music at weddings at the age of 12. He attended the Gaziantep University Conservatory Department. After his studies, Derince set up a music centre in Mersin, where he taught other musicians and began to produce music for himself and other artists.

Derince plays the electric baglama. In various ensemble formats he plays traditional wedding and folk music. The group's music has been described as "a celebration and expression of cultural pride in Kurdish identity".

In January 2020, he performed as part of the annual GlobalFEST celebration of world music in New York. Jon Pareles, the music critic for The New York Times, described the performance as a "whirlwind". NPR described the group's sound as "wild distorted Kurdish wedding music".

Tufan Derince continues to perform at weddings throughout Europe as well as in Turkey and has also performed on NPR's Tiny Desk meets globalFEST series in 2022, at DubaiEXPO2020, and at SXSW in Austin, Texas in March 2022.
