= Naia Izumi =

2018 NPR Tiny Desk Contest winner

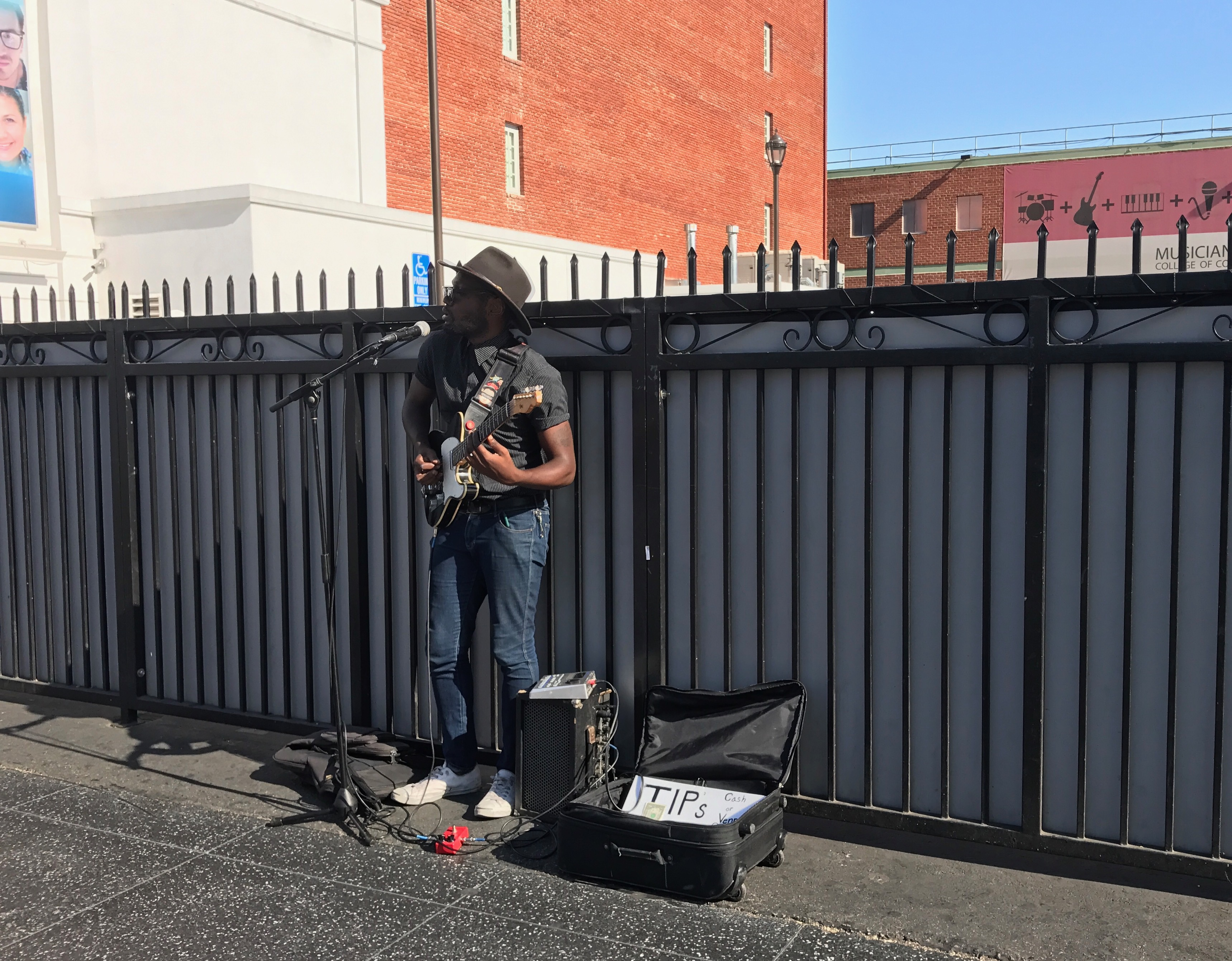
Izumi busking on the streets of Los Angeles in 2017

Naia Izumi is an American guitarist and singer songwriter from Columbus, Georgia.

== Early life ==
Izumi received his first guitar by age 10. He learned how to play the instrument in a closet, hiding from his father, who disapproved of his interest in creating music. His mother is a choir director.

At the age of 16, Izumi was diagnosed with autism. He is open about being autistic, and describes it as "not a problem but instead a unique brain chemistry one can use to accomplish the unexpected".

== Career ==
Izumi began his music career busking on the streets of Los Angeles. Filmmaker Suzuya Bobo met Izumi in LA and offered to create a music video for him. She suggested he submit a song to the NPR Tiny Desk Contest.

In 2018, at age 34, Izumi won the fourth annual NPR Music Tiny Desk Contest with his song "Soft Spoken". According to the series' creator, Bob Boilen, Izumi "impressed the judges with his intricate, complex guitar playing and his sweet, emotive voice." The competition was judged by Boilen, Tarriona "Tank" Ball, Sylvan Esso, and Gaby Moreno. Izumi was surprised to learn he had won, because he forgot he had entered the contest. Following his win, he played a 10-city national tour.

In 2019, Izumi signed to Sony Masterworks. He is sponsored by Fender.

On July 30, 2021, Sony Masterworks released Izumi's debut album, A Residency in the Los Angeles Area. On the album, he played vocals, guitar, bass, drums, Japanese Koto, mandolin, and cittern. Izumi was influenced by King Crimson, Musiq Soulchild, and Shakti. American Songwriter wrote, "it's amazing to see an artist like Izumi make a bold, exciting new sound out of the cherished, ol' six-string. That's raw, unabashed creativity."

In 2022, Izumi played a concert in Bushwick to raise money for abortion access.

== Releases ==
=== Albums ===
- A Residency in the Los Angeles Area (2021)

=== Singles ===
- "Soft Spoken" (2018)
- "Our Gravity" (2019)

=== Shows ===
- Naia Izumi: NPR Music Tiny Desk Concert (2018)

== Personal life ==
Izumi resides in Los Angeles, California. He identified as genderfluid, then as a transgender woman for seven years, but now identifies as a cisgender man. The song that won the Tiny Desk Concert was originally titled "Soft Spoken Woman", and was written about his experiences as a woman.
