= Spencer Murphy =

American bassist and producer (born 1988)

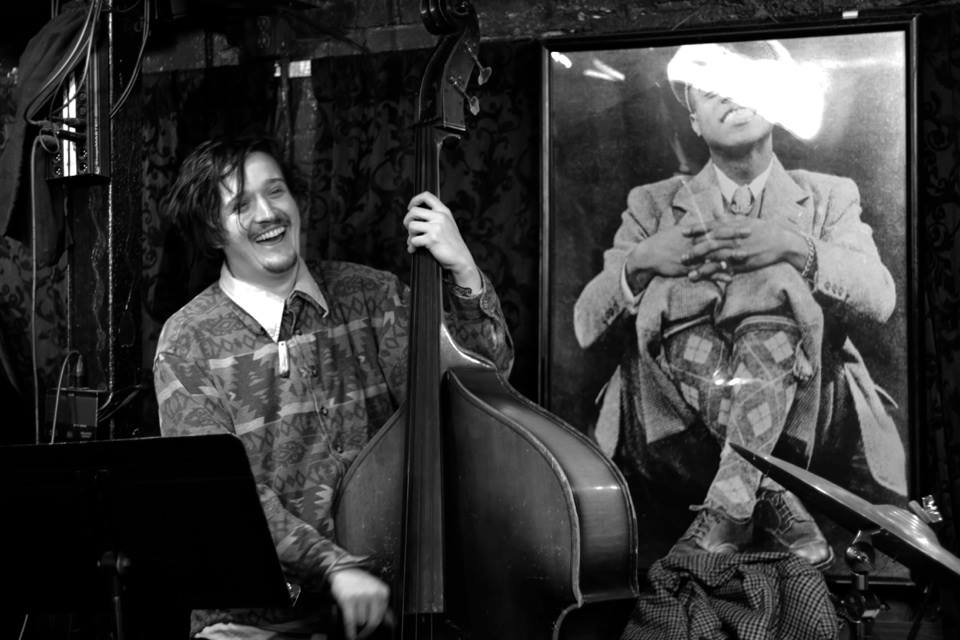
- Murphy in 2014

Background information
- Born: 1988 (age 37–38); Syracuse, New York
- Occupations: Musician; producer
- Years active: 2007–present

Spencer Murphy (born 1988, Syracuse, New York) is an American bassist and producer, living in Brooklyn, New York.

== Education ==
Murphy graduated from Jamesville-DeWitt High School in 2006 before attending SUNY Purchase, where in 2010 he earned a degree in jazz studies.

== Career ==
Murphy had an extended residency at Smalls Jazz Club from 2007-2017, leading a quintet that included Tivon Pennicott, Stacy Dillard, John Chin, and Lawrence Leathers. In the same period, he featured or was featured with Joel Frahm, Melissa Aldana, Dayna Stephens, Ari Hoenig, Emmett Cohen, and Johnny O'Neal.

While a student at SUNY Purchase, Murphy met Gabriel Garzon-Montano, with whom he co-wrote and recorded Mokaad's Booty EP (2012). He played bass with Garzon-Montano's subsequent solo project through 2015, performing at South by Southwest, as well as opening for Lenny Kravitz's Strut World Tour. Murphy co-wrote "Sour Mango," a single from Garzon-Montano's Jardín (2017). In 2020, Murphy appeared as a bassist on Nick Hakim's Will This Make Me Good?, reprising this role a year later alongside long-time collaborators Onyx Collective, on Hakim's co-release with saxophonist Roy Nathanson, Small Things, as well as his 2023 release Cometa.

In October of 2021, he originated the bass chair in the premiere of Only an Octave Apart, starring Justin Vivian Bond and Anthony Roth Costanzo, with music direction from Thomas Bartlett and arrangements by Nico Muhly. In January 2022, Murphy accompanied Bond and Roth Costanzo as they performed selections from the show with the New York Philharmonic, as well as backing the duo in a performance on NPR Tiny Desk. Bartlett again tapped Murphy in 2025 to co-music direct The Platform on the Ocean, an Arthur Russell tribute concert at Little Island featuring Laurie Anderson, Sam Amidon, Martha Wainwright, and others. In 2026, he performed again with Bartlett at Little Island, backing Anderson, Rufus Wainwright, Bill Frisell, Rachel Zegler, Gina Gershon, and Taylor Mac in a 5-night celebration of the 100th anniversary of the birth of poet Allen Ginsberg, during which Murphy was a featured reader in the program's poetry marathon.

In August of 2022, he performed with Helado Negro and Silvana Estrada at Central Park Summerstage, celebrating the release of Doris Muñoz biopic Mija. The following year, he appeared at the 35th Annual Tibet House Benefit at Carnegie Hall, performing with Marc Anthony Thompson, Zsela Thompson, and Scorchio Quartet as Chocolate Genius Inc. In 2024, Chocolate Genius Inc. headlined Big Ears Festival, with a band consisting of both Thompsons, along with Murphy, Marc Ribot, John Medeski, and Claude Coleman Jr.

== Recordings ==
- Various Artists (NYXO) - The New Colossus (2026)
- Ella Hunt - Blindspot (2026)
- Adam O'Farrill - Elephant (2026)
- Henry Jamison - Big Flower Light Go Boom (2026)
- Adam O'Farrill - For These Streets (2025)
- Adam O'Farrill - HUESO (2024)
- Haux - Blue Angeles (2024)
- L'Rain - I Killed Your Dog (2023)
- Sam O.B. - Too Many Humans, Not Enough Souls (2023)
- Benamin - TRIUMPF 1 (2023)
- Morgan James - Nobody's Fool (2023)
- Nick Hakim - Cometa (2022)
- Arp - New Pleasures (2022)
- Julia Stone - Everything Is Christmas (2022)
- Nick Hakim / Roy Nathanson - Small Things (2021)
- Splice Originals - The Sweetest Touch (2021)
- Onyx Collective - Tango (2021)
- Mayer Hawthorne - Rare Changes (2020)
- Nick Hakim - Will This Make Me Good? (2020)
- Onyx Collective - TRAD JAZZ (2020)
- Bartees Strange - Say Goodbye To Pretty Boy (2020)
- YouTube Audio Library - I Think I Can Help You (2019)
- I.G.B.O. - Attitude (2019)
- Onyx Collective - Lower East Suite, Part III (2019)
- Steve Kimock - While We Wait (2019)
- Oh Land - Family Tree (2019)
- Gabriel Garzon-Montano - Jardín (2017)
- Onyx Collective - Lower East Suite, Part II (2017)
- Spencer Murphy, John Chin, Tivon Pennicott, Stacy Dillard, Lawrence Leathers - Fifth (2017)
- Kenneth Salters Haven - Enter to Exit (2015)
- Tivon Pennicott & Sound Quartet - If You Still Trust (2014)
- Archie Pelago - Subway Gothic / Ladymarkers (2012)
- Mokaad - Booty EP (2012)
