= Songs and Instrumentals =

2020 studio albums by Adrianne Lenker

- Songs cover art

Studio album by Adrianne Lenker
- Released: October 23, 2020
- Recorded: April 22 – May 23, 2020
- Studios: Cabin in Westhampton, Massachusetts
- Genres: Acoustic; sound collage; folk; lo-fi
- Length: 39:35 (Songs); 37:24 (Instrumentals)
- Label: 4AD
- Producers: Adrianne Lenker; Phil Weinrobe

Adrianne Lenker chronology
| Abysskiss (2018) | Songs and Instrumentals (2020) | Bright Future (2024) |

Instrumentals cover art

Singles from Songs
- 1. "Anything" Released: September 2, 2020; 2. "Dragon Eyes" Released: October 1, 2020

Songs and Instrumentals (both stylized in all lowercase) are two studio albums by Adrianne Lenker, both released by 4AD on October 23, 2020. They are her fourth and fifth solo albums, respectively.

The two albums were conceived in the aftermath of a breakup and after touring with her band Big Thief was canceled due to the COVID-19 pandemic. They were recorded on an eight-track recording machine while in isolation in a cabin in Massachusetts. Both albums feature a lo-fi sound of primarily Lenker's vocals and acoustic guitar. The album Songs has 11 tracks with more lyrical and traditional songwriting. Instrumentals is composed of two extended instrumental pieces, featuring acoustic guitar improvisation and recordings of chimes and birdsong.

The release was preceded by two singles: "Anything" and "Dragon Eyes". Both albums were met with critical acclaim.

== Background and recording ==
Adrianne Lenker is the lead vocalist and guitarist of the American indie rock band Big Thief. In 2018, she released a solo album titled Abysskiss on Saddle Creek Records. In 2019, Big Thief left Saddle Creek and signed to 4AD, releasing two studio albums: U.F.O.F. in May 2019 and Two Hands in October 2019. The albums were the band's most successful and acclaimed to date: U.F.O.F. received a nomination for the Grammy Award for Best Alternative Music Album and both albums appeared on the Billboard 200 chart, with Two Hands peaking at 113. Their song "Not" from Two Hands was named by many publications as one of the year's best songs.

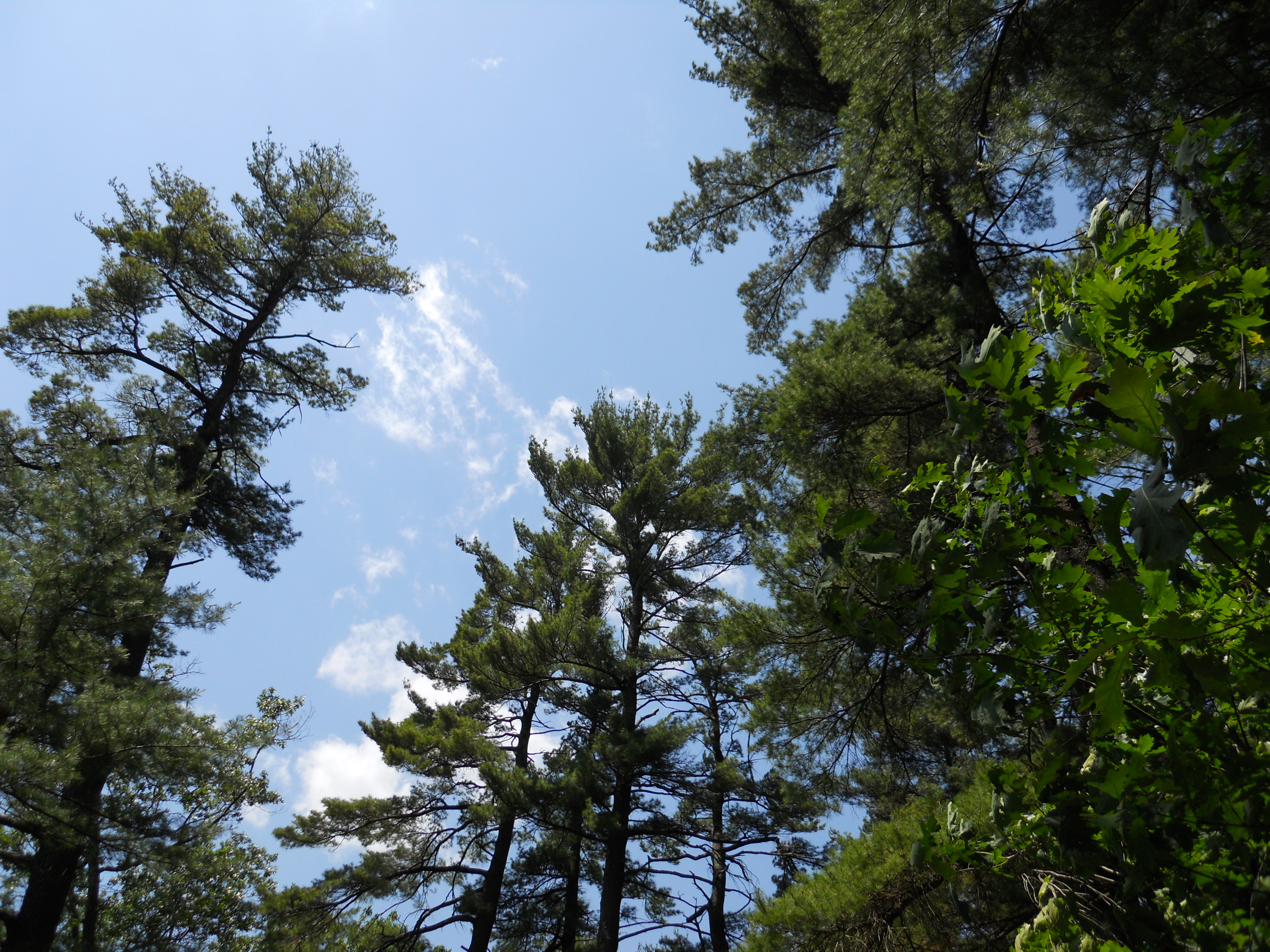
White pines in Massachusetts.

Big Thief toured in support of the albums until March 2020, when their European tour was canceled due to the COVID-19 pandemic. Lenker flew back to New York and drove to Western Massachusetts to be with her sister Zoë, staying in a one-room cabin next door. Lenker planned to take a break from the constant cycle of recording, touring, and promotion she had been in since 2014. She was also dealing with a recent relationship breakup and did not intend to make new music. However, she found herself writing new songs with her guitar while in solitude. She eventually invited audio engineer Phil Weinrobe to assist her in recording new material. Recording took place from April 22 to May 23, 2020, in Westhampton, Massachusetts in the small one-room pine cabin in the foothills of the Berkshire Mountains. The albums were mixed at the end of May at Figure 8 Recording in Brooklyn, New York. The albums feature Lenker's vocals and her playing acoustic guitar, as well using a paint brush and the needles of a white pine tree as instruments. It also features recordings of the rain, the wind, the fire from a wood stove, the chimes on her front porch, the birds, and the insects of the forest.

Lenker and Weinrobe spent three weeks trying to record while dealing with electricity and technical setbacks. They initially considered recording the albums on an old cassette tape. At the time, their only functioning tape recorder was Weinrobe's battery-powered Sony Walkman. Lenker eventually received an Otari eight-track recorder from a friend. The two albums were recorded on analog-analog-analog (AAA), free of all digital processes. Nine of the eleven tracks on Songs were written during the cabin sessions. Lenker and Weinrobe began and ended each day by playing an improvised acoustic guitar piece. They later combined their favorite pieces from these sessions and incorporated them into "Music for Indigo" and "Mostly Chimes" on Instrumentals.

== Music and lyrics ==
Both albums present a lo-fi sound, consisting primarily of Lenker's vocals and acoustic guitar.

=== Songs ===
Songs is a 39-minute album spread across 11 songs which feature more lyrical and traditional songwriting. Lenker avoided writing personal lyrics in her previous work, but felt the need to write from a first-person perspective while dealing with heartbreak. Lenker has called it the "most personal album" she has made. She sings lyrics like "I just want a place with you" on "Dragon Eyes", which she says she would not have normally written.

=== Instrumentals ===
Instrumentals is a 37-minute album composed of two extended instrumental pieces: "Music for Indigo" and "Mostly Chimes". "Music for Indigo" features a collage of acoustic guitar improvisation. Towards the end of the piece, Lenker can be heard sighing and saying "I'm starting over". "Music for Indigo" was written by Lenker for her former partner to listen to while falling asleep at night. "Mostly Chimes" begins with four minutes of some guitar improvisation, but shifts to earth sounds. The remainder of the piece features recordings of primarily wind, chimes and birdsong.

== Release ==
Songs and Instrumentals were announced on September 2, 2020. "Anything" was released as a single the same day. "Dragon Eyes" was released as a single on October 1, 2020. Songs and Instrumentals were released by 4AD on October 23, 2020. A video of Lenker playing "Zombie Girl" in the cabin was released the same day. The albums feature artwork of watercolor paintings by Lenker's grandmother, Diane Lee.

Lenker performed five tracks from the album on NPR's "Tiny Desk (Home) Concert" series, released on November 18, 2020. Lenker performed "Anything" on the January 26, 2021, episode of The Late Show with Stephen Colbert. A video for "Forwards Beckon Rebound" was released on February 3, 2021, featuring Lenker dancing in the California desert at Wild Heart Ranch in Joshua Tree.

== Critical reception ==
Professional ratings
Aggregate scores
| Source | Rating |
|---|---|
| AnyDecentMusic? | 8.3/10 (Songs); 8.2/10 (Instrumentals) |
| Metacritic | 84/100 |
Review scores
| Source | Rating |
| AllMusic | 3.5/5 stars |
| DIY | 4.5/5 stars |
| Exclaim! | 9/10 (Songs); 8/10 (Instrumentals) |
| The Independent | (Songs) |
| The Line of Best Fit | 9/10 |
| Mojo | 3/5 stars |
| NME | 4/5 stars |
| Pitchfork | 8.8/10 |
| The Times | 5/5 stars |
| Uncut | 8/10 |

At Metacritic, which assigns a normalized rating out of 100 to reviews from mainstream critics, Songs and Instrumentals received an average score of 84 based on 19 reviews, indicating "universal acclaim".

Roisin O'Connor of The Independent gave Songs a perfect score, writing, "It's excruciating in its honesty – even for Lenker, who's hardly known for shying away from her feelings. Now she bares her pain with complete abandon. It's quite extraordinary." Peter Watts of Uncut gave the album an 8 out of 10 rating, writing, "Most musicians would use these sounds to ground the music in a sense of naturalism, but with Lenker it enhances the mystery."

In her three-star review for Mojo, Victoria Segal wrote that the albums "seem to have rolled away from the modern world entirely" and that Songs felt more focused with Lenker's "sweet, freshly cut" vocals. The Uproxx editorial staff highlighted the two albums among the releases the week of October 25 for Indie Mixtape, calling them a "fitting pair of albums to soundtrack autumnal living".

=== Year-end lists ===
Year-end lists with Songs and Instrumentals
| Publication | List | Rank | Ref. |
|---|---|---|---|
| Double J | The 50 best albums of 2020 | 33 (Songs) | |
| Esquire UK | The 50 Best Albums of 2020 | 11 | |
| Exclaim! | 50 Best Albums of 2020 | 45 (Songs) | |
| Gigwise | 51 Best Albums of 2020 | 41 (Songs) | |
| The Independent | The 40 best albums of 2020 | 9 (Songs) | |
| The Line of Best Fit | The Best Albums of 2020 | 27 (Songs) | |
| Magnet | Top 25 Albums of 2020 | 4 | |
| Noisey | The 100 Best Albums of 2020 | 39 (Songs) | |
| NPR | The 50 Best Albums of 2020 | 29 (Songs) | |
| Paste | The 50 Best Albums of 2020 | 9 (Songs) | |
| Pitchfork | The 50 Best Albums of 2020 | 11 | |
| PopMatters | The 60 Best Albums of 2020 | 19 | |
| Slant Magazine | The 50 Best Albums of 2020 | 27 (Songs) | |
| Under the Radar | Top 100 Albums of 2020 | 32 (Songs) | |
| Uproxx | The Best Albums of 2020 | 39 | |
| Vulture | The Best Albums of 2020 | 2 | |

== Track listing ==
All tracks are written by Adrianne Lenker.

Songs track listing
| No. | Title | Length |
|---|---|---|
| 1. | "Two Reverse" | 3:33 |
| 2. | "Ingydar" | 4:08 |
| 3. | "Anything" | 3:22 |
| 4. | "Forwards Beckon Rebound" | 3:09 |
| 5. | "Heavy Focus" | 2:34 |
| 6. | "Half Return" | 2:08 |
| 7. | "Come" | 5:17 |
| 8. | "Zombie Girl" | 2:44 |
| 9. | "Not a Lot, Just Forever" | 4:10 |
| 10. | "Dragon Eyes" | 3:26 |
| 11. | "My Angel" | 5:04 |
| Total length: | | 39:35 |

Japanese bonus track
| No. | Title | Length |
|---|---|---|
| 12. | "Red Leaves, Falling" | 2:50 |

All tracks are written by Adrianne Lenker.

Instrumentals track listing
| No. | Title | Length |
|---|---|---|
| 1. | "Music for Indigo" | 21:12 |
| 2. | "Mostly Chimes" | 16:12 |
| Total length: | | 37:24 |

Notes

- All tracks are stylized in all lowercase.

== Credits ==
Credits adapted from the album's liner notes and Bandcamp.

- Adrianne Lenker – vocals, acoustic guitar, paintbrush, needles of a white pine tree, production
- Phil Weinrobe – recording, mixing, production
- Scott Hull – mastering
- Brendan Ford – lacquer cut
- Diane Lee – front and back cover paintings
- Sarah Schiesser – design, layout

== Charts ==
Chart performance for Songs and Instrumentals
| Chart (2020) | Peak position |
|---|---|
| Belgian Albums (Ultratop Flanders) | 49 |

Chart performance for Songs
| Chart (2024) | Peak position |
|---|---|
| Lithuanian Albums (AGATA) | 100 |

== Certifications ==
Certifications for Songs and Instrumentals
| Region | Certification | Certified units/sales |
|---|---|---|
| United States (RIAA) | Gold | 500,000^{‡} |
^{‡} Sales+streaming figures based on certification alone.
