= I Won't Let Go of Your Hand =

EP by Adrianne Lenker
- Released: March 11, 2024
- Length: 20:47

Adrianne Lenker chronology
Instrumentals (2020)	I Won't Let Go of Your Hand (2024)	Bright Future (2024)

I Won't Let Go of Your Hand is an extended play by American indie folk musician Adrianne Lenker. All proceeds of the EP go to the Palestine Children's Relief Fund.

== Track listing ==
All tracks are written by Adrianne Lenker.

I Won't Let Go Of Your Hand track listing
No.	Title	Length
1.	"the music"	3:23
2.	"feel it all"	3:55
3.	"fangs lungs ankles"	2:43
4.	"i won't let go of your hand"	3:10
5.	"relief"	3:56
6.	"someone to"	3:40
Total length:		20:47
