= The Jazz Passengers =

US-american jazz band

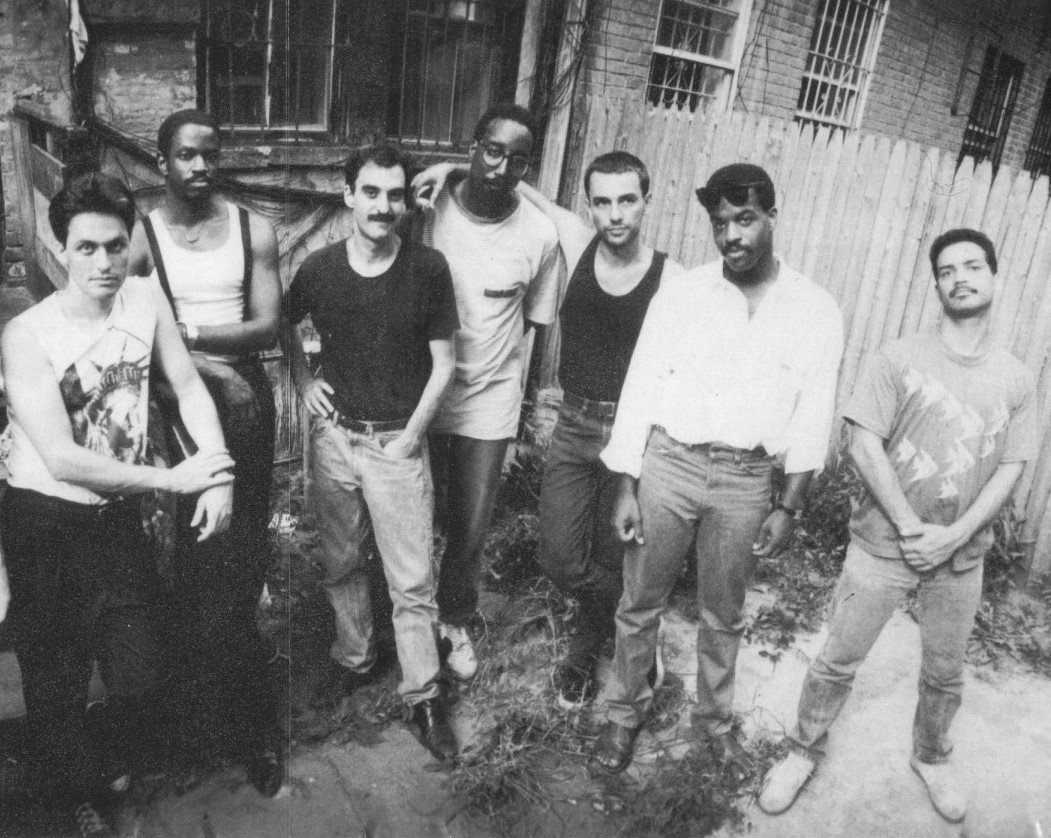
The Jazz Passengers

The Jazz Passengers are an American jazz group founded in 1987 by saxophonist Roy Nathanson and trombonist Curtis Fowlkes. Alongside musicians like John Zorn, Don Byron, and John Lurie, they are widely regarded as pioneering voices in the 1980s East Village jazz scene that centered around clubs like The Knitting Factory.

== Career ==
The band grew out of a partnership between Nathanson and Fowlkes, who met in the early 1980s while playing in the pit orchestra of the Big Apple Circus, both subsequently joining John Lurie's band The Lounge Lizards before forming The Jazz Passengers. Other regular members include vibraphonist Bill Ware, bassist Brad Jones and drummer E. J. Rodriguez; the group has often featured a violinist (Rob Thomas, Jim Nolet or, more recently, Sam Bardfeld), as well as guitarists Marc Ribot and David Fiuczynski.

The album that is perhaps their masterpiece, the Hal Willner-produced In Love (High Street, 1994), features vocal contributions from Deborah Harry of Blondie, Jeff Buckley, Jimmy Scott, Bob Dorough and Mavis Staples. Harry later became a regular member of the band, appearing on a number of follow-up albums, including Individually Twisted, which includes a duet between Harry and Elvis Costello, as well as an additional Costello solo number. Recently the Passengers have recorded infrequently as a full ensemble, though the individual members' recent side projects tend to feature many fellow Passengers, as well as a similarly skewed musical sensibility.

During a European tour in 1997, Hal Dace produced their concert film "Play Normally!" featuring Deborah Harry. It was filmed in Oxford and London.

In 2005, Nathanson composed a work commemorating the world's oldest object, a 4.404 billion year old zircon found in Australia. The work was performed by The Jazz Passengers at a "Rock Concert" held in Madison, Wisconsin in April of that year.

Fowlkes and Nathanson participated in several intergenerational projects, including Nick Hakim's 2021 release Small Things, a collaboration between Hakim and members of Onyx Collective.

Curtis Fowlkes died from heart failure in Brooklyn, New York, on August 31, 2023, at the age of 73. His memorial was held at St Peter's Church in Manhattan on May 1, 2024, and featured artists like The Jazz Passengers, Elvis Costello, The Liberation Music Orchestra, Steven Bernstein's Millennial Territory Orchestra, and Catherine Russell.

== Discography ==
=== Studio albums ===
- 1987 – Broken Night Red Light (Les Disques du Crépuscule)
- 1988 – Deranged and Decomposed (Les Disques du Crépuscule)
- 1990 – Implement Yourself (New World)
- 1993 – Plain Old Joe (Allegro/Knitting Factory)
- 1994 – In Love (High Street, Windham Hill)
- 1996 – Individually Twisted (32 Jazz) with Deborah Harry
- 2010 – Reunited (Justin Time)
- 2017 – Still Life with Trouble (Enja)
- 2024 – Big Large: In Memory of Curtis Fowlkes (FOOD)

=== Live albums ===
- 1991 – Live at the Knitting Factory (Knitting Factory)
- 1998 – "Live" in Spain (32 Jazz) with Deborah Harry
- 2005 – The Rock Concert (A Stony Muse Production/Roy Nathanson)
