= Onyx Collective (band) =

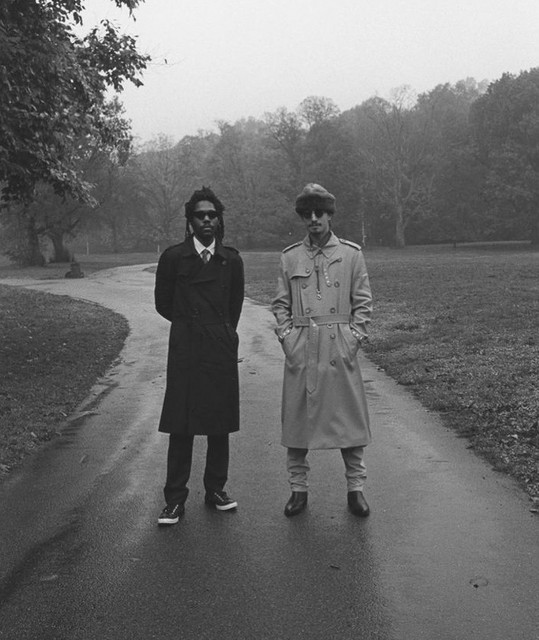
Austin Williamson and Isaiah Barr of Onyx Collective

Onyx Collective is an American experimental jazz group, founded by saxophonist Isaiah Barr and drummer Austin Williamson. Since forming in 2014, the group has released 7 albums and featured a rotating cast of dozens of members and guest musicians.

== History ==
Both New York City natives, Barr and Williamson met while still in high school, and were mentored by saxophonist Roy Nathanson of The Jazz Passengers. In October 2014, they began hosting a show on KNOW-WAVE Radio, bringing in guests to jam live on-air, which led to collaborations with station regulars like Dev Hynes and Wiki.

Barr and Williamson have spoken extensively in interviews about their ties to the Manhattan neighborhoods of the East Village and Lower East Side. A number of titles of compositions featured on Onyx Collective's Lower East Suite Part One (2017), Lower East Suite Part Two (2017), and Lower East Suite Part Three (2018) contain references to downtown Manhattan landmarks, including "2 AM At Veselka," "Rumble in Chatham Square," "Don't Get Caught Under The Manhattan Bridge," and "97 Allen," a reference to the headquarters of clothing brand The Good Company.

From 2014 until 2020, Onyx Collective became known for their guerrilla approach to public performance, presenting improvised music in non-traditional pop-up venues in Lower Manhattan, including clothing stores, barber shops, and gallery spaces. In 2016, they hosted NYXO, a three-month residency at 225 West Broadway in Tribeca, which featured musicians as varied as Show Me The Body, Phony PPL, and Puerto-Rican jazz legend John Benitez.

Onyx Collective recordings and performances have featured vocalists like Dev Hynes, Kelsey Lu, Nick Hakim, Princess Nokia, duendita, Okay Kaya, Julian Soto, and Ian Isiah; pianists Julius Rodriguez, Isaac Sleator, Mike Swoop, and Josh Benitez; bassists Felix Pastorius, Spencer Murphy, Walter Stinson, Daryl Johns, and Dean Torrey; drummers Yussef Dayes and David Frazier, Jr., and guitarist Jack Gulielmetti. They have appeared on albums by Nick Hakim, Ian Isiah, Princess Nokia, and Radamiz, and toured as the backing band for A$AP Rocky. In 2021, Onyx Collective collaborated with funk band Chromeo on "Baby".

The band has had a longtime association with the New York City visual art scene, specifically artists Julian Schnabel, Brian Bellott, Adam Zhu, and Maxwell Dieter; in a formal exhibition setting, they've contributed to Jason Moran's Jazz On A High Floor in the Afternoon at The Whitney, as well as Agathe Snow's Stamina at The Guggenheim.

Individually, Williamson has recorded as a drummer with Blood Orange, Standing On The Corner, Miho Hatori, and Pretty Sick, while Barr has been featured as a composer and saxophonist on recordings by Bakar, David Byrne, and Ratking.

== Discography ==
- 2nd Avenue Rundown (2016, Supreme / Know Wave)
- Lower East Suite Part One (2017, Big Dada)
- Lower East Suite Part Two (2017, Big Dada)
- Lower East Suite Part Three (2018, Big Dada)
- World of Possibility (2019, Big Love Records)
- Trad Jazz (2020, NYXO / Braindead)
- Manhattan Special (2020, tmwrk / Concord)
