= Will This Make Me Good =

Studio album by Nick Hakim
- Released: May 15, 2020
- Length: 52:55
- Label: ATO

Nick Hakim chronology
Green Twins (2017)	Will This Make Me Good (2020)

Professional ratings
Aggregate scores
Source	Rating
Metacritic	75/100
Review scores
Source	Rating
AllMusic	4/5 stars
Clash	7/10
Exclaim!	7/10
Pitchfork	6/10
Rolling Stone	3.5/5 stars
Under the Radar	7/10

Will This Make Me Good (stylized in capitals) is the second studio album by American musician Nick Hakim. It was released on May 15, 2020, under ATO Records.

== Background ==
In an interview for Discogs, Hakim was asked what music he listened to that influenced him during the album's creation, and he listed the following records: Free Your Mind... and Your Ass Will Follow (1970) by Funkadelic, There's a Riot Goin' On (1971) by Sly and the Family Stone, Comfort Woman (2003) by Meshell Ndegeocello, Love for Sale by Bilal, Journey Through "The Secret Life of Plants" (1978) by Stevie Wonder, Bandana (2019) by Freddie Gibbs and Madlib, A Quiet Farwell 2016–2018 by Slauson Malone, Black Woman (1970) by Sonny Sharrock, Sweet Exorcist (1973) by Curtis Mayfield, It'll All Be Over by Supreme Jubilees, Fôrça Bruta (1970) by Jorge Ben, and Damn (2017) by Kendrick Lamar. He also cited the music of Robert Wyatt, Cities Aviv, MIKE, ESG, and, especially, the Parliament-Funkadelic collective.

== Critical reception ==
Will This Make Me Good was met with "generally favorable" reviews from critics. At Metacritic, which assigns a weighted average rating out of 100 to reviews from mainstream publications, this release received an average score of 75, based on 7 reviews.

== Track listing ==
Will This Make Me Good track listing
No.	Title	Music	Length
1.	"All These Changes"	Nick Hakim	4:10
2.	"Wtmmg"	Hakim	4:43
3.	"Bouncing"	Hakim; Kyle Miles	6:39
4.	"Let It Out"	Hakim	1:54
5.	"Qadir"	Hakim; Miles	7:32
6.	"All These Instruments"	Danny Hakim; Nick Hakim	4:09
7.	"Drum Thing"	Hakim; Miles	2:48
8.	"Vincent Tyler"	Hakim; Naím Thomas	2:58
9.	"Crumpy"	Hakim; Spencer Murphy; Vishal Nayak	3:08
10.	"Gods Dirty Work"	Hakim; Jacob Sherman	4:26
11.	"Seeing Double"	Hakim; Murphy; Nayak	5:23
12.	"Whoo"	Hakim	5:05
Total length:			52:55

Will This Make Me Good (The Remixes)
No.	Title	Length
1.	"All These Changes" (Sarlo Remix)
2.	"Wtmmg" (Cleo Reed Remix)
3.	"Bouncing" (Nelson Bandela Remix)
4.	"Let It Out" (Pink Siifu Remix)
5.	"Qadir" (BadBadNotGood Remix)
6.	"All These Instruments" (AceMo Remix)
7.	"Drum Thing" (Benamin Remix)
8.	"Vincent Tyler" (Kareem Ali Remix)
9.	"Crumpy" (Slauson Malone Remix)
10.	"Gods Dirty Work" (Luke Temple Remix)
11.	"Seeing Double" (James Krivchenia Remix)
12.	"Whoo" (KeiyaA Remix)
