= Jim Nolet =

American jazz musician

Jim Nolet (born 1961) is an American jazz violinist, artist, performer, and educator known internationally as a composer/improviser in world and jazz idioms. He has a particular interest in the music of Brazil. He has performed in the United States, Canada, Europe, Japan, and Latin America.

Nolet studied at the Juilliard School and the Cornish College of the Arts, where he studied privately with jazz bassist Gary Peacock. He has performed or recorded with David Murray, Fred Hopkins, Hilton Ruiz, John Hicks, Joanne Brackeen, Hamiet Bluiett, Cecil Taylor, Don Cherry, Arturo O'Farrill, and the Jazz Passengers. Nolet has received critical acclaim, with Down Beat magazine awarding Nolet in the “International Critics Poll” for “Talent Deserving Wider Recognition," and C. Michael Bailey, (allaboutjazz) describing Nolet as "the finest jazz violinist playing."

== Early life and education ==
Nolet began violin, guitar, and percussion at age six. At age 13, he began improvising and playing professionally while continuing his classical studies. His studies extended from Juilliard School to Cornish Institute of the Arts, among others. He also studied violin/viola with: Thomas Rodrique, Dr. Huber, Christine Olason, Professor Chao, Jerome Hines, Gary Peacock (Jazz improvisation, theory/composition), Art Lande (Jazz Composition), Al Galante (Jazz Composition) David Burgess (classical guitar), Eddie Bobe (Afro Cuban percussion), and Rodrigo Rodrigues Goncalves (Brazilian percussion). His “symphonic” work includes among others: the NYU Symphony Orchestra and the Federal Way Symphony. Nolet’s jazz Identity took shape in workshops, studios and clubs in New York, where his work in the mainstream, bop, and Latin music circles ensured the development of a jazz and world music foundation that is encompassed in his work.

== Career ==
Nolet has performed and presented his works in such venues as the Lincoln Center in New York, Queen Elizabeth Hall in London, Lucerna Hall in Prague, Club Faschings in Stockholm, Cafe Munich in Germany, Club Metro in Chicago, The Moore Theatre in Seattle, and Club Bird in Japan. He has performed, recorded and toured throughout the United States, Europe, Japan, South America and Canada, with jazz notables such as Arturo O'Farrill, David Murray, Monica Salmaso, Rodrigo Rodrigues, Fred Hopkins, Marcia Lopes, John Purcell, Jay Rodriguez, John Hicks, Tim Hagans, Marvin Sewell, Charles Eubanks, John Zorn, John Bruschini, Jazz Passengers, Michael Bisio, Don Byron, Joanne Bracken, Marc Ribot, John Lurie, Steve Berrios, Frank Lacy, Hamiet Bluiett, Don Cherry, Cecil Taylor, and others.

Nolet also maintained a working relationship with the musical theater, performing on and off Broadway with remarkable music arrangers/directors Diedre Murray and Linda Twyne.

=== 1980s and 1990s ===
Nolet’s first working Jazz trio as a teenager featured bassist Bradley Jones and guitarist Dave Tronzo called the NY Hot String Trio a regular at the “5&10” on Greene St, also known as “Ali’s Alley”. As an original charter member of “the Jazz Passengers,” Nolet helped form “Attention Shoppers” and when bassist Tony Garnier left Nolet called on Brad Jones to join the group which later became “the Jazz Passengers” and upon completion of their first record “Broken Night Red Light” Roy Nathanson was defined as the leader. The group disbanded in late 1995 after the completion of “In Love” and the band reformed as Debbie Harry and the Jazz Passengers as a six piece ensemble. In 1987, Nolet also co-founded a non-profit school with Bern Nix for traditional, modern and jazz studies in New York City called the Composers’ Improviser’s Workshop. Besides Nix and Nolet, the faculty included David Murray, Glenn Moore, Fred Hopkins, Eddie Bobe, Jay Rodriguez, Roy Campbell, and others. Nolet presented the CIW workshops at colleges and venues around the world. In the 1990s Nolet led StringFaced featuring Bern Nix, Fred Hopkins and Diedre Murray reviewed by Jon Parales, toured Europe, and released a CD through the Knitting Factory Works label. Nolet was also a member of the David Murray Big Band conducted by Butch Morris and worked in ensembles with Cecil Taylor. Nolet also formed the New York String Improvisors Orchestra which featured conductors Butch Morris and John Zorn.

=== 2000s ===
Collaborating with Brazilian artist Rodrigo Rodrigues, Nolet founded and began working in the Brazilian-Jazz band, “Arco Voz” in Brazil in 2000. He released “Arco Voz” in 2001 and opened a U.S. tour in the fall of 2002. Arco Voz facilitated a US tour again in 2017 the vocalist Monica Lopes contributed her talent to Arco Voz at the Brazilfest in NYC among other major US cities.

=== Upcoming projects ===
==== Arco Mundo and Arco Voz Dois ====
In "Arco Mundo" Nolet uses a core string ensemble, often with percussion. This ensemble represents musical languages taken from various latin music regions such as Brazil, Spain, Argentina, Portugal, Cuba, the Caribbean, France, and Loisaida Nueva York. Popular local performing artists of each region are presented in the recordings and performances of Arco Mundo. Many of the pieces are composed and/or arranged by Nolet.

“Arco Voz Dois” begins in the form of his previous solo CD entitled “Arco Voz,” which had a core string ensemble with percussion that featured several popular singers of Brazil, such as Marcia Lopes and Monica Salmaso. Arco Mundo’s premiere recording features compositions highlighting Latin music beyond just Brazil, including Portugal, Cuba, Argentina, Spain and Loisaida Nueva York. “Arco Voz Dois” Features Brazilian Vocalist Marcia Lopes and the original members of Arco Voz.

== Discography ==
- Syzygy (Cathexis)
- With You (KFW)
- String Faced (KFW)
- Arco Voz (Cathexis)

=== Discography as Co-Leader ===
With The Jazz Passengers

- Jazz Passengers: Broken Night, Red Light (1987)
- Decomposer By A Neck (1989)
- Implement Yourself (1990)
- Live in Bremen, Live-Love series Vol. 4 (1990)
- Jazz Passengers; Live at the Knitting Factory (1991)
- Live at The Knitting Factory (1993)
- Plain Old Joe (1993)
- The Jazz Passengers Live at Vassar (1994)
- In Love (1996)

=== Discography as Side Man ===
With Michael Bisio

- Undulations (1999)

With John Bruschini

- The Way We Were (2000)

With Diedre Murray

- Running Man (1999)
- Fangs (2001)
- Brutal Imagination (2001)

With Howard Mandell

- History of Jazz (2000)
- John McLaughlin Mahavishnu Orchestra Redefined (2008)

With Cornelius Eady

- Allison (2012)

With Seigen Ono

- Paris (1992)

With David Casper

- Twilight (1983)

With Rob Brown

- Listen (1984)

With Marc Ribot

- Vignettes Musical (1998)

== Personal life ==
Jim Nolet is married to Maria Angelica Castello Barnett Nolet.
