= Indigo Sparke =

Australian indie rock musician

Indigo Sparke is an Australian indie rock musician from Sydney.

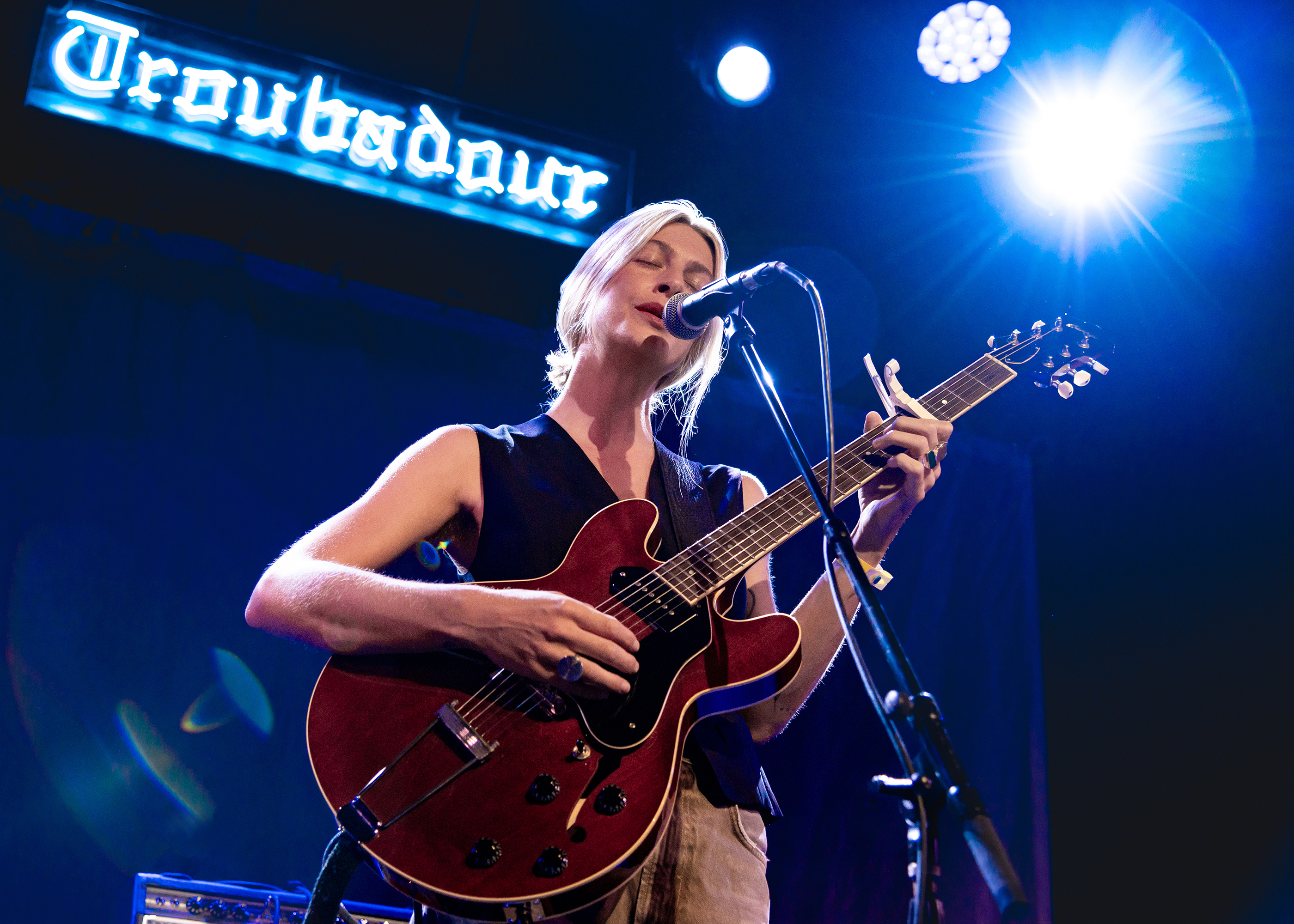
Sparke in 2023

== History ==
Sparke announced her debut album in 2020, with plans to release it the following year. In early 2021, Sparke signed to the label Sacred Bones Records. She released her album, Echo, through the label on February 19. The album was co-produced by Adrianne Lenker (her partner at the time) and Andrew Sarlo, who had previously produced some of the Big Thief records. In mid 2022, Sparke announced a new album, Hysteria, to be released through Sacred Bones on 7 October. The album is produced by The National’s Aaron Dessner.

== Discography ==
=== Albums ===
- Echo (2021)
- Hysteria (2022)
