= Jardín (album) =

Studio album by Gabriel Garzón-Montano
- Released: January 27, 2017
- Studio: Waterfront Studios, Hudson, New York
- Genre: R&B, Alternative R&B
- Length: 38:36
- Label: Stones Throw Records
- Producer: Gabriel Garzón-Montano

Gabriel Garzón-Montano chronology
Bishouné: Alma del Huila (2014)	Jardín (2017)	Agüita (2020)

Singles from Jardín
- 1. "Sour Mango" Released: November 2, 2016; 2. "The Game" Released: December 1, 2016; 3. "Crawl" Released: January 6, 2017

Jardín is the debut studio album by singer Gabriel Garzón-Montano. It was released on January 27, 2017 by Stones Throw Records. The album was supported by three singles: "Sour Mango", "The Game", and "Crawl". The album was fully produced, arranged, composed and performed by the multi-instrumentalist and vocalist.

Professional ratings
Aggregate scores
Source	Rating
Metacritic	81/100
Review scores
Source	Rating
AllMusic	4/5 stars
Clash	8/10
Pitchfork	7.4/10
Q	4.5/5 stars

== Critical reception ==
Jardín received a positive critical reception. At Metacritic, which assigns a normalized rating out of 100 to reviews from mainstream publications, the album received an average score of 81, based on seven reviews. Q noted that "what really elevates the songs though, is the underlying weave of Latin-influenced percussion and subtle string arrangements which draw deftly on Garzon-Montano's French-Colombian roots". Elias Leight of Pitchfork said that "Montano settles on an unusual and fertile combination of sounds, knitting together the burnished, languorous acts of the late '60s and early '70s—the Association, Todd Rundgren—with lean, hair-trigger grooves. The result is heavy on pearly funk and pop, live instrumentation and harmony... Similarly heaped vocal passages, teeming with good ideas, are everywhere on the second half of Jardín. Montano especially enjoys contrasting blocky, beeline melodies from A to B with more scenic paths, as if to gently chide ruthless, shortest-route-best-route songwriters."

== Track listing ==
All tracks are written by Gabriel Garzón-Montano, except where noted.

No.	Title	Writer(s)	Length
1.	"Trial"		1:53
2.	"Sour Mango"	Garzón-Montano; Spencer Murphy	4:19
3.	"Fruitflies"		5:30
4.	"The Game"		4:10
5.	"Long Ears"		3:56
6.	"Crawl"		3:50
7.	"Bombo Fabrika"		5:00
8.	"Cantiga"		3:12
9.	"My Balloon"	Garzón-Montano; Alex Frenkel	4:15
10.	"Lullaby"		2:31
Total length:			38:36

== Personnel ==
- Gabriel Garzón-Montano – producer, arranger, primary artist, composer, performer
- David Frazier Jr. – drums on "The Game" and "Crawl"
- Alex Frenkel – guitars, effects, processing on "Bombo Fabrika" and "My Balloon"
- Joshua Modney (violin), Megan Atchley (violin), Mariel Roberts (cello) – strings on "Trial", "Sour Mango", "Bombo Fabrika"
- Luna Garzón-Montano – additional vocals on "Bombo Fabrika"
- Henry Hirsch – mixing and recording at Waterfront Studios, Hudson, New York
- Heba Kadry – mastering at Timeless Mastering, New York, New York
