= Abysskiss =

Studio album by Adrianne Lenker
- Released: October 5, 2018
- Recorded: 2018
- Studios: Panoramic House, West Marin, California
- Genre: Folk
- Length: 33:42
- Label: Saddle Creek
- Producer: Luke Temple

Adrianne Lenker chronology
| Hours Were the Birds (2014) | Abysskiss (2018) | Songs (2020) |

Singles from Abysskiss
- 1. "Cradle" Released: August 7, 2018; 2. "Symbol" Released: September 12, 2018; 3. "From" Released: October 2, 2018

Abysskiss (stylized in all lowercase) is the third solo studio album by Adrianne Lenker, released through Saddle Creek Records on October 5, 2018. The album was recorded at Panoramic House in West Marin, California, with Luke Temple and Gabe Wax, who respectively handled production and engineering duties. The album consists of ten songs conceived while touring with Big Thief. The tracks "Terminal Paradise" and "From" were given a full band arrangement on Big Thief's album, U.F.O.F., released in 2019.

== Release ==
Abysskiss was announced on August 7, 2018. "Cradle" was released as a single the same day. "Symbol" was released as a single on September 12, 2018. "From" was released as the final single, three days before the album's release. Abysskiss was released by Saddle Creek Records on October 5, 2018. The music video for "Symbol", featuring Lenker performing the track on the boardwalk of Coney Island, was released on November 29, 2018.

== Critical reception ==
Professional ratings
Aggregate scores
| Source | Rating |
|---|---|
| AnyDecentMusic? | 7.7/10 |
| Metacritic | 83/100 |
Review scores
| Source | Rating |
| AllMusic | 4/5 stars |
| DIY | 4/5 stars |
| Drowned in Sound | 9/10 |
| Exclaim! | 7/10 |
| The Line of Best Fit | 8/10 |
| Loud and Quiet | 8/10 |
| NME | 3/5 stars |
| Pitchfork | 8.0/10 |
| The Skinny | 4/5 stars |
| Uncut | 9/10 |

At Metacritic, which assigns a normalized rating out of 100 to reviews from mainstream critics, Abysskiss received an average score of 83 based on 14 reviews, indicating "universal acclaim". Jayson Greene of Pitchfork gave Abysskiss an 8 out of 10 rating, writing, "The shared secrets of intimacy, the buried secrets of family, the impenetrable secrets of nature—they all swirl like sediment in a wine glass. abysskiss thrums quietly with the unease of these secrets, of mingled trauma and love." Lizzie Manno of Paste gave the album an 8.5 out of 10 rating, writing, "Providing newfound comfort and warm familiarity, abysskiss is a record that will quickly find its way into your heart and slowly caress your soul."

In his four-star review for VultureHound, Jake Doolin noted Lenker's ability to find "new ways of making her instruments sing", while also praising Temple's "stripped back production". Adam Turner-Heffer of Drowned in Sound gave the album a 9 out of 10 rating, writing, "Nothing feels disingenuous about Lenker's story or approach or music, which anyone who has witnessed Big Thief's surprisingly upbeat and even humorous stage personas – at odds with their reasonably heavy music – can attest. Lenker is an incredible talent."

== Track listing ==
All tracks are written by Adrianne Lenker.

| No. | Title | Length |
|---|---|---|
| 1. | "Terminal Paradise" | 3:59 |
| 2. | "From" | 3:38 |
| 3. | "Womb" | 2:15 |
| 4. | "Out of Your Mind" | 3:51 |
| 5. | "Cradle" | 3:17 |
| 6. | "Symbol" | 3:49 |
| 7. | "Blue and Red Horses" | 3:17 |
| 8. | "Abyss Kiss" | 3:03 |
| 9. | "What Can You Say" | 2:28 |
| 10. | "10 Miles" | 4:01 |
| Total length: | | 33:42 |

Rough Trade Exclusive Demos

| No. | Title | Length |
|---|---|---|
| 1. | "Questions (demo)" | 3:03 |
| 2. | "Homesick (demo)" | 3:03 |
| 3. | "Fly (demo)" | 1:09 |
| Total length: | | 7:15 |

Notes

- Track titles are stylized in all lowercase.

== Personnel ==
Credits adapted from Bandcamp.

- Adrianne Lenker – vocals, guitar, synthesizers
- Gabe Wax – synthesizers, engineering, mixing
- Luke Temple – synthesizers, bass, guitar, production
- Greg Calbi – mastering
- Zoë Lenker – cover photography
