= Nick Hakim =

American musician

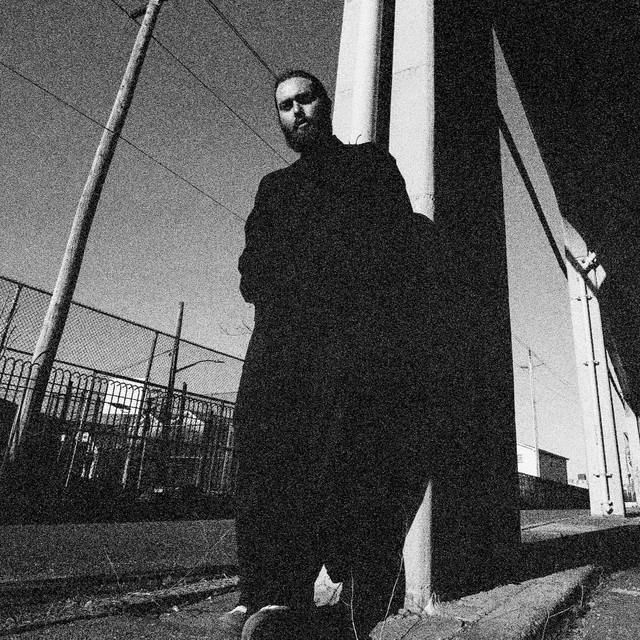
- Hakim in 2023

Background information
- Origin: Washington, D.C., U.S.
- Genre: Neo soul
- Occupation: Singer • songwriter • record producer
- Years active: 2013–present
- Label: ATO Records • Earseed Records
- Website: nickhakim.com

Nicolas Hakim is an American musician based in Queens, New York, United States. His first EP, Where Will We Go Part 1 & 2, was self-released in 2014. He released three albums with ATO: Green Twins (2017), Will This Make Me Good (2020), and Cometa (2022).

== Career ==
Nick Hakim was born and raised in Washington, D.C. by his parents, a Chilean mother and Peruvian father, where he was surrounded by a diverse array of musical influences. At 17, a friend invited him to sing with her church choir, where Hakim taught himself to play piano. Soon after, he was accepted to Boston's Berklee College of Music, and whilst there, he released 2014's two-part EPs Where Will We Go.

In 2017, Hakim released Green Twins through ATO Records and toured internationally. The album went on to earn critical acclaim by media outlets including Pitchfork and The Guardian, and was named one of the Ten Best R&B Albums of 2017 by NPR. Vice called it a "soulful, psychedelic experience". One of the tracks off the album, "Needy Bees", was featured in an episode of HBO's Insecure. The following year, Hakim contributed original music to HBO's Random Acts of Flyness, directed by longtime collaborator Terence Nance. In 2018, Hakim performed on NPR's Tiny Desk Concerts.

In 2020 he released his second studio album, Will This Make Me Good. He collaborated with Erykah Badu and contributed to her livestream concert series 'Too Sensitive' in September 2020. A remixed version of Will This Make Me Good was released in 2021 and included remixes from BadBadNotGood, KeiyaA, Slauson Malone, Pink Siifu and more. Soon thereafter he released Small Things, a collaboration with saxophonist Roy Nathanson and Onyx Collective.

In October 2022, Hakim released his third studio album, Cometa. "Happen" was released as the first single from the album. Hakim toured internationally following the release of Cometa, including an extended tour with Lil Yachty in celebration of his release of Let's Start Here, an album to which Hakim contributed extensively.

He played the piano and sang on Adrianne Lenker's 2024 album Bright Future. In March 2024, Lenker released two videos recorded at Electric Lady Studios of Hakim and herself performing songs from Bright Future.

== Discography ==
=== As leader ===
- Where Will We Go (Part I) (Earseed Records, 2014)
- Where Will We Go (Part II) (Earseed Records, 2014)
- Green Twins (ATO Records, 2017)
- Will This Make Me Good (ATO Records, 2020)
- Small Things (NYXO, 2021)
- Cometa (ATO Records, 2022)
- I Can See (Earseed Records, 2026)

=== As producer, sideman or featured artist ===
- AZ Chike, No Rest for the Wicked (Warner, 2026)
- Eddie Chacon, Lay Low (Stones Throw, 2025)
- Adrianne Lenker, Bright Future (4AD, 2024)
- Zooey Celeste, Restless Thoughts (ATO, 2023)
- Lil Yachty, Let's Start Here (Motown, 2023)
- Pink Siifu, Negro (2020)
- Kassa Overall, Animals (Warp, 2023)
- Slauson Malone, Excelsior (Warp, 2023)
- Juan Wauters, Real Life Situations (Captured Tracks, 2022)
- Julius Rodriguez, Let Sound Tell All (Verve, 2022)
- Whitney, Spark (Secretley Canadian, 2022)
- Okay Kaya, Sap (Jagjaguwar, 2022)
- Anderson .Paak, Oxnard (Aftermath, 2021)
- Lianne La Havas, Lianne La Havas (Warner, 2020)
- Gabriel Garzon-Montano, Aguita (Jagjaguwar, 2020
- Slingbaum, Slingbaum One (2020)
- Nilufer Yanya, Feeling Lucky (ATO, 2020)
- T-Pain, 1UP (Cinematic Music Group, 2019)
