= Otari MTR 90 MKII =

Multitrack Tape Recorder

The Otari MTR 90 MKII is an analog 2" magnetic tape Multi Track Recorder (MTR) machine produced by the Otari corporation, Japan, between 1987 and 1991. The MTR 90 MKII was the successor to the popular MTR 90 released in 1982, and included refinements to tape operation, precision and controller functionality. The high build quality and functional modular design have allowed the machines to continue operating long past the end of production in 1991. Many recording artists and producers praise the Otari MTR 90 MKII for the saturation and sound quality of its recordings, using the machine as part of hybrid or analog workflows within modern studio environments.

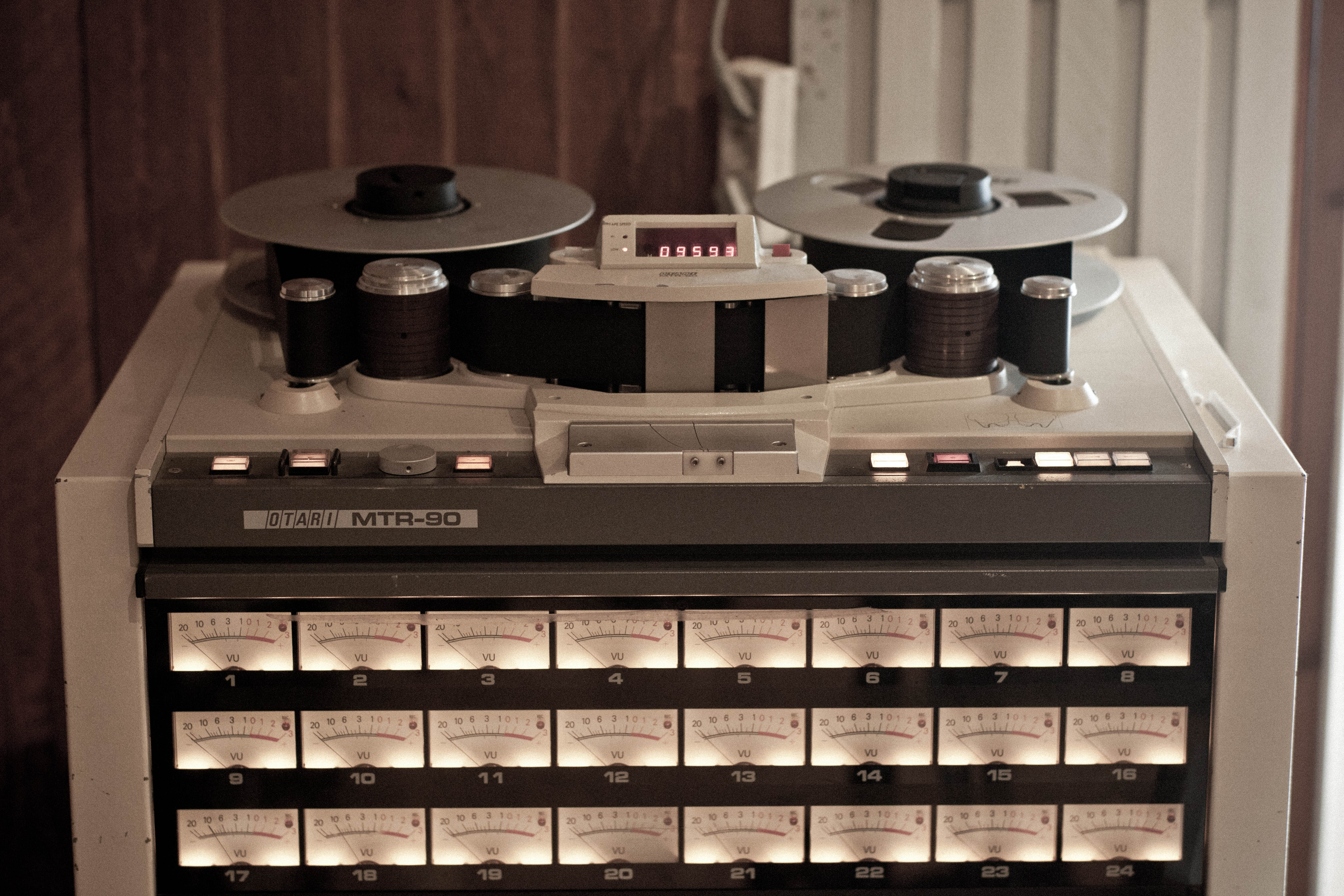
Otari MTR-90 2" 24ch reel to reel, Mankku Studio

== Popular Works ==
The Otari MTR 90 MKII was a workhorse of the recording industry for many years, and is still used in music creation today. As a result, it has featured on many notable works including:

Recordings Featuring Otari MTR 90MKII
| Type | Title | Artist | Producer | Year Released |
|---|---|---|---|---|
| Album | A Moon Shaped Pool | Radiohead | Nigel Godrich | 2016 |
| Album | In Rainbows | Radiohead | Nigel Godrich | 2007 |
| Album | Mellon Collie and the Infinite Sadness | The Smashing Pumpkins | Flood and Alan Moulder | 1995 |
