= Bright Future (Adrianne Lenker album) =

Studio album by Adrianne Lenker
- Released: March 22, 2024
- Recorded: 2022
- Studio: Double Infinity
- Length: 43:31
- Label: 4AD
- Producers: Philip Weinrobe; Adrianne Lenker

Adrianne Lenker chronology
I Won't Let Go of Your Hand (2024)	Bright Future (2024)

Singles from Bright Future
- 1. "Ruined" Released: December 5, 2023; 2. "Sadness as a Gift" Released: January 17, 2024; 3. "Fool" Released: February 20, 2024; 4. "Free Treasure" Released: March 18, 2024

Bright Future is the sixth solo studio album by Adrianne Lenker. It was released on March 22, 2024, through 4AD. The album received widespread acclaim and was nominated for Best Folk Album at the 67th Annual Grammy Awards.

== Background and release ==
Recorded in autumn 2022 at Double Infinity, a recording studio in the woods, Bright Future was produced by frequent collaborator Philip Weinrobe with contributions from Nick Hakim, Mat Davidson, and Josefin Runsteen. To Lenker, these musicians constitute "some of the best listeners" that shine through their "extreme presence", although she initially had no intentions of creating an album with them. The record was recorded, mixed, and mastered completely on analog tape; "Adrianne and I never once looked at a computer screen while making this record," Weinrobe said. About the recording process," Lenker revealed that "no one stopped a take" or listened back and she "only listened after everybody else left", saying that it was "magical".

The lead single "Ruined" was released on December 5, 2023, and revolves around "a kind of romantic downfall" and "the effects of obsessive rumination". Lenker stated she believes wrote the song when she was 25 years old, seven years before its appearance on the album. She said "it's the first time I'm ever bringing it out into the world because I feel like I can play it and sing it in a different way. When I tried it with piano, that's what made all the difference. I think it felt too simple for me to sing. It's just not as wordy."

Accompanying the album announcement, Lenker released the second single "Sadness as a Gift" on January 17, 2024. The song features a "tender blend of twangy guitar, violin, and piano" paired with her "affectionate" voice. One of the first songs recorded for the album, "Fool", was released as the third single on February 20. Weinrobe thought the "joy is palpable" on the song and feels like he can "hear [Lenker] laughing and smiling" when listening back. "Free Treasure" was released as the fourth and final single on March 18. The opening track, "Real House", references "the first film that made [Lenker] scared", which she later revealed during an interview on Kyle Meredith With... to be a reference to the 1998 film Deep Impact.

On August 6, 2024, Lenker released the single "Once a Bunch", which was recorded during the Bright Future sessions and originally appeared as a bonus track on the Japanese edition of the album.

== Critical reception ==
Professional ratings
Aggregate scores
Source	Rating
AnyDecentMusic?	8.4/10
Metacritic	87/100
Review scores
Source	Rating
AllMusic	4.5/5 stars
Clash	9/10
DIY	4/5 stars
Exclaim!	9/10
The Line of Best Fit	9/10
Mojo	4/5 stars
NME	4/5 stars
Paste	9.7/10
Pitchfork	8.4/10
Record Collector	4/5 stars

According to the review aggregator Metacritic, Bright Future received "universal acclaim" based on a weighted average score of 87 out of 100 from 22 critic scores. Editors at the review aggregator AnyDecentMusic? granted Bright Future an 8.4 out of 10, based on 22 critics' scores.

Reviewing the album for AllMusic, Marcy Donelson wrote that Bright Future was "the type of no-filler album with enough variety and poignancy that each song is bound to be somebody's favorite." The Line of Best Fit also gave a positive review, complimenting Lenker's blend of "folk, country, and psychedelia".

In an advance review for Pitchfork, Andy Cush praised the album as "free-flowing and intuitive" and gave it the distinction of Best New Music. He selected "Real House" and "Evol" as stand-out tracks. In another positive review, Matt Brown of DIY noted that the album had a "seriousness that hasn't necessarily been harnessed before" in Lenker's previous work. John Amen of No Depression wrote, "With Bright Future, Lenker retreats into a frequently contemplative space, setting aside Big Thief's genre-defining gestalts and Songs' more volatile stances ... [her] latest set accentuates her depth and versatility, reminding us that she's an avant-gardist and a traditionalist, attuned to the future as well as the past.

On November 8, 2024, Bright Future was nominated for Best Folk Album at the 67th Annual Grammy Awards. It is her first solo work to be nominated for a Grammy Award.

=== Year-end lists ===
Select year-end rankings for Bright Future
Publication/critic	Accolade	Rank	Ref.
Exclaim!	50 Best Albums of 2024	24	
MOJO	75 Best Albums of 2024	35	
The New Yorker	The Best Albums of 2024	16	
Paste	The 100 Best Albums of 2024	16	
Rough Trade UK	Albums of the Year 2024	21	
Stereogum	The 50 Best Albums of 2024	19	
Time Out	The Best Albums of 2024	18	
Uncut	80 Best Albums of 2024	6	

== Track listing ==
All tracks are written by Adrianne Lenker.

Bright Future track listing
No.	Title	Length
1.	"Real House"	5:58
2.	"Sadness as a Gift"	4:19
3.	"Fool"	2:54
4.	"No Machine"	3:00
5.	"Free Treasure"	3:35
6.	"Vampire Empire"	3:55
7.	"Evol"	4:44
8.	"Candleflame"	2:34
9.	"Already Lost"	3:27
10.	"Cell Phone Says"	2:38
11.	"Donut Seam"	2:25
12.	"Ruined"	4:32
Total length:		43:31

== Personnel ==
Musicians

- Adrianne Lenker – vocals (all tracks), 12-string acoustic guitar (2), acoustic guitar (3–6, 8–11), electric guitar (3), piano (7, 12)
- Nick Hakim – piano (1–2, 6), vocals (2, 4, 6, 11)
- Josefin Runsteen – violin (1–2, 7–8), vocals (2, 4, 6–8, 11), percussion (6)
- Mat Davidson – electric guitar (2), vocals (2, 4–6, 8, 11), acoustic guitar (4–5), violin (6), piano (8)
- Philip Weinrobe – piano (3), banjo (9)
- Noah Lenker – percussion (9)

Technical

- Adrianne Lenker – production
- Philip Weinrobe – production, mixing
- Josh Bonati – mastering

Artwork

- Diane Lee – painting
- Germaine Dunes – cover photography, additional album photography
- Buck Meek – additional album photography
- Noah Lenker – additional album photography
- Sarah Schiesser – layout

== Charts ==
Chart performance for Bright Future
Chart (2024)	Peak position
Australian Albums (ARIA)	53
Austrian Albums (Ö3 Austria)	65
Belgian Albums (Ultratop Flanders)	17
Belgian Albums (Ultratop Wallonia)	88
Dutch Albums (Album Top 100)	33
German Albums (Offizielle Top 100)	92
Irish Albums (IRMA)	63
New Zealand Albums (RMNZ)	28
Portuguese Albums (AFP)	57
Scottish Albums (Official Charts)	8
Swiss Albums (Schweizer Hitparade)	75
UK Albums (Official Charts)	35
UK Independent Albums (Official Charts)	5
US Americana/Folk Albums (Billboard)	18
US Heatseekers Albums (Billboard)	5
US Independent Albums (Billboard)	40
US Top Album Sales (Billboard)	28
