= Adrianne Lenker =

American singer-songwriter (born 1991)

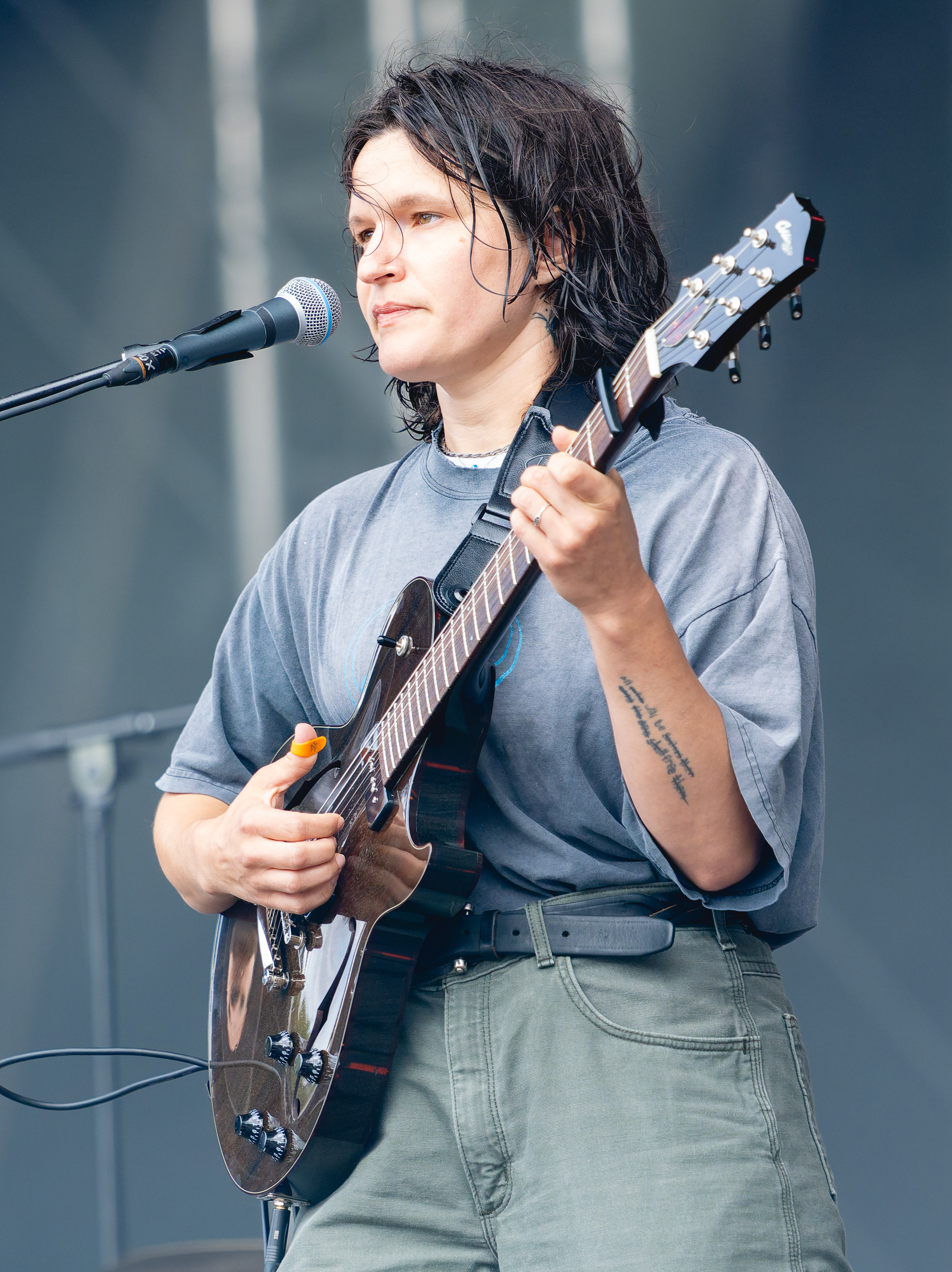
- Lenker performing with Big Thief in 2024

Background information
- Born: Adrianne Elizabeth Lenker; July 9, 1991 (age 35); Indianapolis, Indiana, U.S.
- Origin: Minnesota, U.S.
- Genre: Indie folk
- Occupation: Musician
- Instruments: Vocals, guitar
- Years active: 2006–present
- Labels: Saddle Creek; 4AD
- Member of: Big Thief
- Website: adriannelenker.com

Adrianne Elizabeth Lenker (born July 9, 1991) is an American musician. She is the lead vocalist, guitarist and principal songwriter of the band Big Thief, as well as an established solo artist. She has released several solo albums, including Abysskiss (2018), Songs and Instrumentals (both 2020), and Bright Future (2024), the latter of which earned her a nomination for the Grammy Award for Best Folk Album.

== Early life and education ==
Lenker was born in Indianapolis, but primarily grew up in Minnesota. She was raised in a Christian cult until the age of four.

Lenker has a younger sister, Zoë, and a younger brother, Noah. Noah is a musician who supported Lenker and Big Thief on a number of occasions playing Jew's harp on their song "Spud Infinity", and has also directed videos for Big Thief and Lenker's solo work.

When Lenker was five years old, she was hospitalized after a railroad spike fell from the roof of a makeshift treehouse in the yard of her family's rented home in Nisswa, lodging itself into her skull and nearly killing her. She recounts the incident in the song "Mythological Beauty" from Big Thief's second album Capacity (2017).

After leaving the cult, the family began living out of a large blue van. They moved frequently, renting homes throughout the Midwest. They lived with a Russian couple and their five children in a two-bedroom apartment in Coon Rapids. They also lived with two women who were living an Amish lifestyle. They lived in a total of 14 different houses by the time she was 8 years old. Around this time, her father became disillusioned with the religion and they bought a house in the Minneapolis suburbs.

She spent winters at her grandparents' house in Andover. Her grandmother is a watercolorist and the former owner of an antique store in Andover.

Lenker was homeschooled. Her parents divorced when she was 12, and she began experimenting with substances in her mid-teens.

She began learning music from her father, a musician and songwriter who played guitar and piano. He taught her basic chords as well as unconventional chords and melodies on guitar. She and her siblings took voice lessons. When she was 12, her father sent her on a bus through the Twin Cities to spend time with a musician who was a stay-at-home dad. He introduced her to different albums and worked with her on songwriting. Her father would also bring her to open mic nights, and she would play bars when she was 12. She taught herself to play guitar by writing her own music; she wrote her first song at the age of eight, and recorded her first album at the age of 13. She also studied martial arts extensively, and was state karate champion three years in a row.

At some point, Lenker eventually enrolled in public school, but was not successful. She recounts that she would intentionally show up late for school in order to get lunch detention to avoid social alienation in the lunchroom. She did not attend high school and instead received her GED at the age of 16. She attended Berklee College of Music on a scholarship provided by Susan Tedeschi of the Tedeschi Trucks Band, and started her first band there.

== Career ==
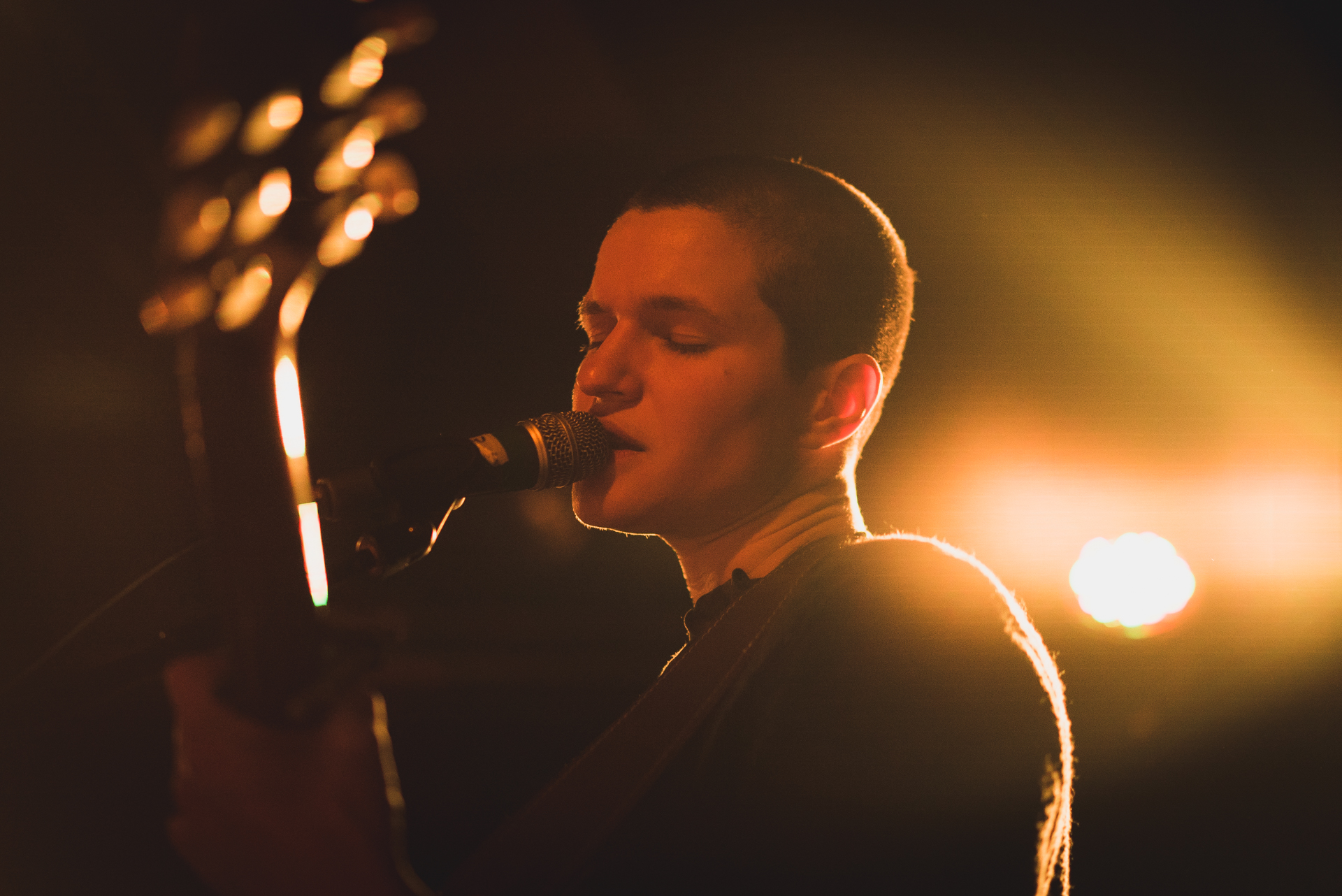
Lenker performing with Big Thief in 2017

Lenker began her music career by the age of 13 with her father as her manager. On February 28, 2006, when Lenker was 14, she released her first solo album, Stages of the Sun. On January 9, 2014, Lenker self-released her second solo album, Hours Were the Birds; the album was reissued by Saddle Creek Records on November 16, 2018.

On May 1, 2014, Lenker, together with future bandmate Buck Meek, released the LP records a-sides and b-sides. In 2015, Lenker and Meek, alongside Max Oleartchik and Jason Burger, formed the band Big Thief. James Krivchenia, who was originally hired to engineer the band's debut studio album, joined the band later to replace Burger as drummer. Their first album, Masterpiece, was released in May 2016 to rave reviews. The band has since released five more albums, and has been touring every year since their formation.

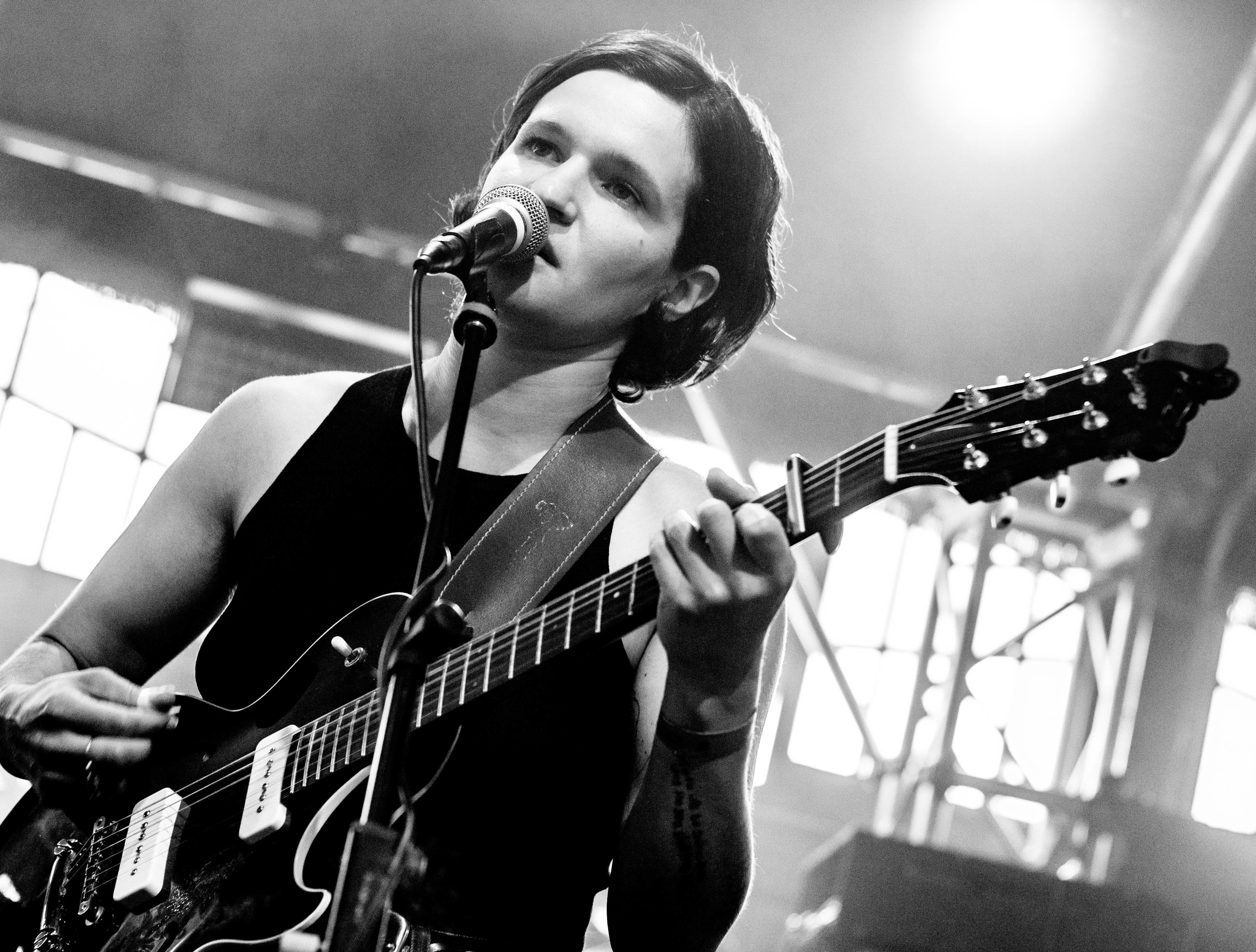
Lenker performing with Big Thief in 2018

Lenker released her third solo album, Abysskiss, on October 5, 2018, through Saddle Creek. The album consisted of songs Lenker wrote while touring with Big Thief, and two of the songs received full arrangements, which were rereleased on the band's album U.F.O.F. a few months later.

While in isolation during the COVID-19 pandemic, Lenker wrote and recorded two albums, Songs and Instrumentals, which were released on 4AD on October 23, 2020. The albums focused on less production and a more acoustic sound with traditional folk songwriting and improvisation. Both albums were recorded without any digital processes, utilizing an analog-analog-analog (AAA) recording method.

In January 2024, Lenker partnered with School of Song to teach a four-week course on songwriting, which focused on ways to expand creativity through different guitar techniques and lyrical focuses. In the same month, Lenker also announced her sixth studio album, Bright Future, which was released via 4AD on March 22, 2024.

On March 11, 2024, Lenker self-released an EP, I Won't Let Go of Your Hand, exclusively on Bandcamp with proceeds going to the Palestine Children's Relief Fund.

In 2025, she contributed the song "Wonder Return" to the documentary Sally.

== Artistry ==
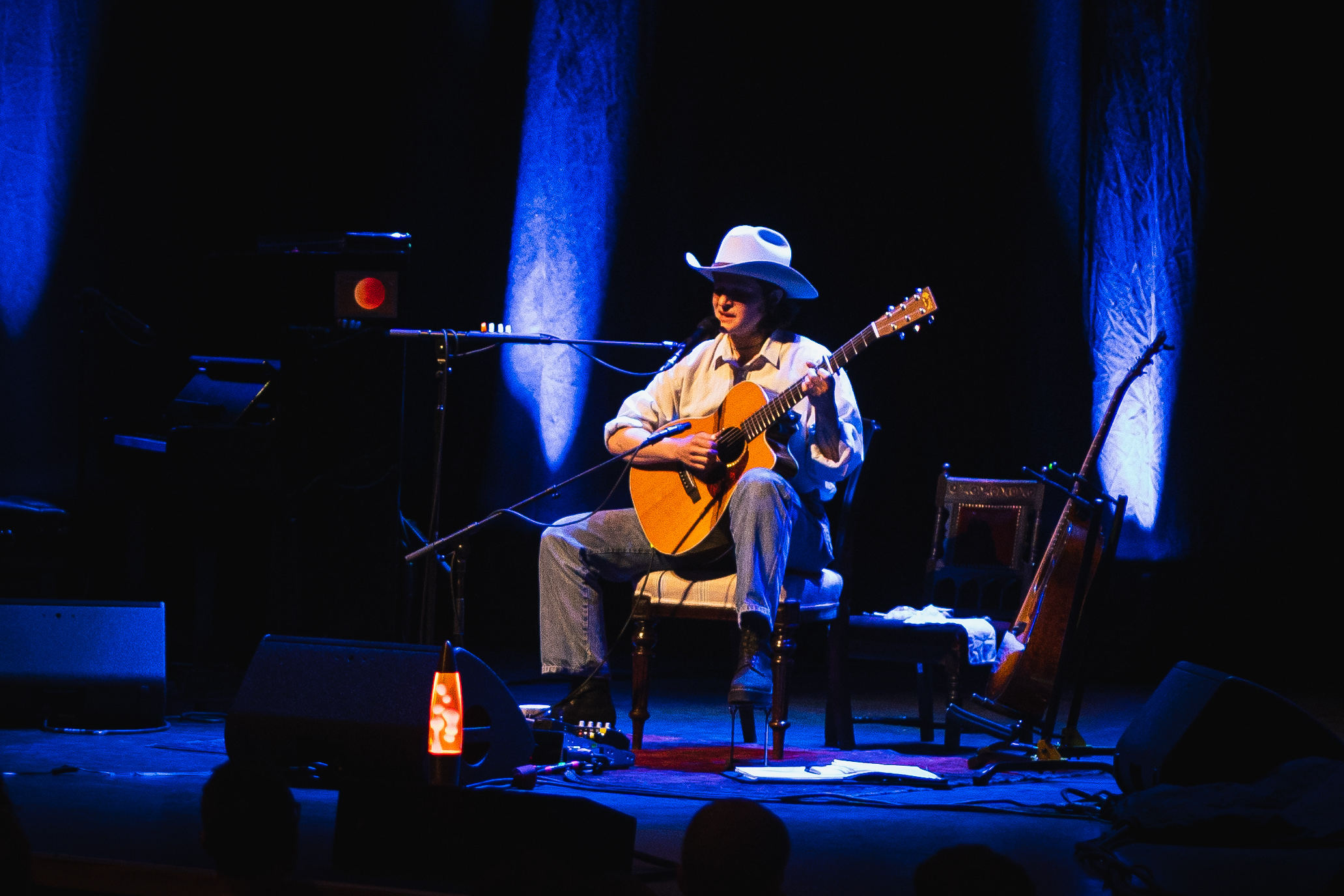
Lenker performing at the Barbican Centre in London, April 2024

Lenker's lyrics have been described by NPR as "unequivocal", "instinctive" and "deeply personal". Many of Lenker's song titles are names of people, though some are actually written about herself. She explained, "Sometimes I need a name for themes in my songs, but oftentimes they're just about me or directed to myself". Juan Edgardo Rodríguez of PopMatters characterized Lenker as an "omniscient narrator" in her writing style, stating: "She doesn't step into her stories as much as she does inhabit them, perceiving herself as a quiet observer who understands that love can swing between attraction and resentment."

Lenker elaborated on her mindset and approach to songwriting in an interview, where she likened her process to a "collaboration with the universe or a higher power". She said:

"It doesn't feel like it's just originating from my brain. It feels like I'm following an invisible thread of intuition, from one choice to the next [...] maybe I don't even fully understand once I've written it, but it just feels right. And I just trust that. And then over time, it reveals its layers of meaning to me. That's a mark of what I feel is a good song. It keeps me wanting to play it."

== Personal life ==
Lenker met her future Big Thief co-founder Buck Meek at a concert when she lived in Boston. She then re-encountered him at Mr. Kiwi, a small grocery store in Bushwick, Brooklyn, the day she moved to New York. The pair began to play together, and married when Lenker was 24. They divorced in 2018, remaining in Big Thief as "deep friends". She later spoke of continuing to work with Meek in the band following the divorce:

"It's felt sustainable because there's an extraordinary amount of love. Bucky and I are like family and we fell in love, we were together for seven years. We got married, we got a divorce, all while still being on tour. We figured out our way through it day by day. I know that for all of us, it's not about maintaining a career or about continuing to have income. What I really have that doesn't come and go is my love for the craft and for my loved ones. Those are the things I need to nurture first and foremost..."

In 2019, Lenker was in a relationship with the artist Indigo Sparke, and the two separated sometime in 2020. In 2024, she announced her relationship with singer-songwriter Staci Foster.

While Lenker is comfortable with the label "queer", she has expressed a desire not to define her sexual orientation beyond that. Her lyrics often contain discussions of gender and the gender binary. In an interview with The Brag, Lenker said of those lyrics: "I feel within myself a constant dialogue between my masculinity, my femininity and the part of me that is neither of those things. I'm just trying to talk about it because I feel like I'm something that is very ambiguous."

== Discography ==
Adrianne Lenker discography
- Studio albums: 6
- EPs: 3
- Live albums: 1
- Compilation albums: 1
- Singles: 1

=== Studio albums ===
Title	Details	Peak chart positions						Certifications
Title	Details	US Folk	US Heat	US Indie	US Sales	AUS	NZ	Certifications
Stages of the Sun	Released: 2006; Label: LucidTunes; Formats: CD	—	—	—	—	—	—	
Hours Were the Birds	Released: January 4, 2014; Label: Self-released, Saddle Creek (reissue); Formats: LP, CD, digital download, streaming	—	—	—	—	—	—	
Abysskiss	Released: October 5, 2018; Label: Saddle Creek; Formats: LP, CD, digital download, streaming	—	10	39	—	—	—	
Songs	Released: October 23, 2020; Label: 4AD; Formats: LP, CD, cassette, digital download, streaming	12	11	—	43	—	—	RIAA: Gold
Instrumentals	Released: October 23, 2020; Label: 4AD; Formats: LP, CD, cassette, digital download, streaming	12	11	—	43	—	—	RIAA: Gold
Bright Future	Released: March 22, 2024; Label: 4AD; Formats: LP, CD, cassette, digital download, streaming	18	5	40	28	53	28	

=== Live albums ===
Title	Details
Live at the Southern	Released: 2006; Label: LucidTunes; Formats: CD
Live at Revolution Hall	Released: April 24, 2025; Label: 4AD; Formats: Cassette, digital download, streaming

=== Compilation albums ===
Title	Details
a-sides and b-sides (with Buck Meek)	Released: November 16, 2018; Label: Saddle Creek; Formats: LP, CD

=== Extended plays ===
Title	Details
a-sides (with Buck Meek)	Released: May 1, 2014; Label: Saddle Creek; Formats: Digital download, streaming
b-sides (with Buck Meek)	Released: May 1, 2014; Label: Saddle Creek; Formats: Digital download, streaming
I Won't Let Go of Your Hand	Released: March 11, 2024; Format: Digital download

=== Singles ===
==== As lead artist ====
Title	Year	Certifications	Album
"Cradle"	2018		Abysskiss
"Symbol"	2018		Abysskiss
"From"	2018		Abysskiss
"Anything"	2020	RIAA: Platinum	Songs
"Dragon Eyes"	2020		Songs
"Ruined"	2023		Bright Future
"Sadness as a Gift"	2024		Bright Future
"Fool"	2024		Bright Future
"Free Treasure"	2024		Bright Future
"Once a Bunch" (Bonus track)	2024		Bright Future

==== As featured artist ====
Title	Year	Album
"Carousel" (Ginla featuring Adrianne Lenker)	2022	Everything
"Dresser Hill" (Mary Elizabeth Remington featuring Adrianne Lenker)	2023	In Embudo

== Awards and nominations ==
Award	Year	Nominated work	Category	Result	Ref.
Brit Awards	2025	Herself	International Artist	Nominated	
Grammy Awards	2020	U.F.O.F.	Best Alternative Music Album	Nominated	
Grammy Awards	2021	"Not"	Best Rock Song	Nominated	
Grammy Awards	2021	"Not"	Best Rock Performance	Nominated	
Grammy Awards	2023	"Certainty"	Best Alternative Music Performance	Nominated	
Grammy Awards	2023	Dragon New Warm Mountain I Believe in You	Best Alternative Music Album	Nominated	
Grammy Awards	2025	Bright Future	Best Folk Album	Nominated	
UK Music Video Awards	2025	"Not a Lot, Just Forever"	Best Live Video	Nominated	
