= Otari (company) =

Japanese professional audio equipment manufacturer

Otari Co., Ltd.
- Native name: オタリ株式会社
- Type: K.K.
- Industry: Industrial electronics, Professional audio, Broadcast engineering, Manufacturing
- Founded: Mitaka, Tokyo, Japan (April 1965; 61 years ago)
- Founder: Masayuki Hosoda; Mitsuo Takekawa
- Headquarters: 4-29-18 Minami-Ogikubo, Suginami, Tokyo, Japan
- Key people: Hisashi Hosoda (President and CEO)
- Products: Industrial manufacturing equipment; Ultrasonic cleaning systems; PCB processing equipment; Packaging automation systems; Magnetic tape / LTO systems; Broadcast transmission systems; Professional audio equipment
- Number of employees: ~246

Otari Co., Ltd. (オタリ株式会社, Otari Kabushiki-gaisha) is a Japanese industrial electronics and manufacturing company headquartered in Suginami, Tokyo. Founded in 1965, it is best known for its professional reel-to-reel tape recorders, particularly the MX and MTR series, which were widely used in recording studios and broadcasting during the 1970s–1990s.

Otari develops and produces industrial equipment including ultrasonic cleaning systems, printed circuit board processing machinery, packaging automation systems, and specialized broadcast transmission equipment.

== History ==
Otari Co., Ltd. was established in April 1965, in Mitaka, Tokyo, Japan. Founder Masayuki Hosoda had previously spent ten years as an engineer at TEAC before establishing the company. In 1974, Otari expanded internationally by setting up a subsidiary, Otari Corporation, in San Carlos, California, with co-founder Mitsuo Takekawa, who had previously been a director of Shibaden (Hitachi Group’s video tape division). During the 1970s and 1980s, the company expanded further as demand for professional multitrack recording equipment increased. It established divisions in the United States, Europe (Germany), and Singapore.

Otari developed numerous tape recorder models for studio and broadcast use, including the MX series and MTR series multitrack machines. The company's products gained a reputation for durability and ease of maintenance, contributing to widespread adoption in recording studios.

In addition to magnetic tape systems, in 1994, Otari expanded into digital audio recording systems, marketing the iZ Technology RADAR line of digital audio recorders.

== Products ==
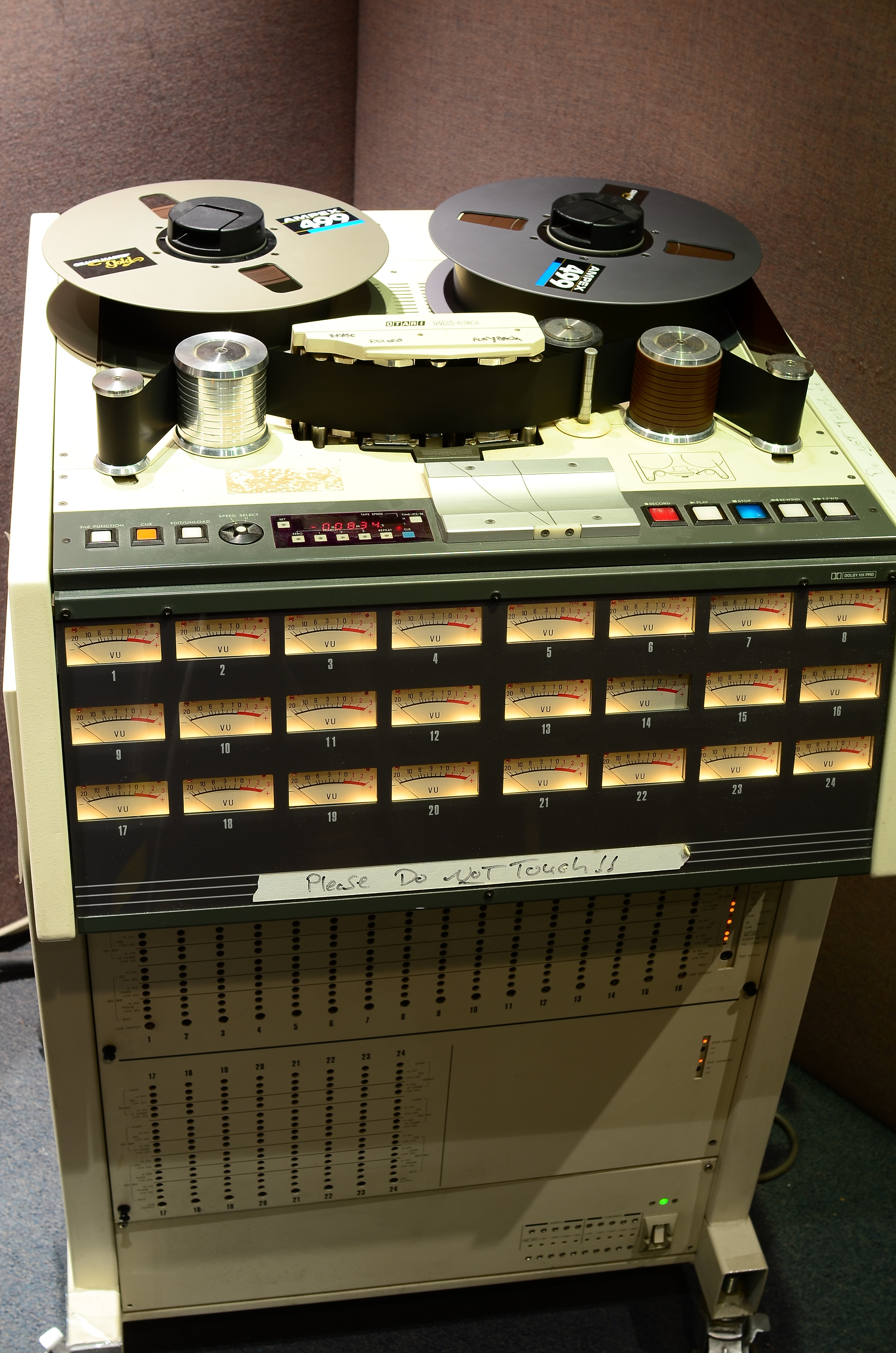
Otari MX-80 24-track tape recorder

Products manufactured by Otari include:

- Mastering tape recorders
- Multitrack tape recorders
- Broadcast audio consoles
- Radio automation systems (ARS-1000 DC)
- Digital audio recorders (DR-10N, RADAR)
- Optical fiber audio/video transmission systems (Lightwinder)

Notable products include the following:

- Otari MTR 90 MKII
- Otari MX-5050
- Otari MTR-10
- Otari RADAR
- Otari Concept and Status series consoles

== Lightwinder ==
The Lightwinder (LWB series) is an optical fiber-based multi-channel audio and video transmission system developed by Otari, primarily for broadcast and remote production use. First introduced in 1998 for the Nagano Winter Olympics, the system is known for its high stability, modularity, and portability. It supports microphone inputs, analog and digital audio (including AES3 and MADI), intercom, SDI video, and remote control signals over long-distance fiber optic cables.

Current models such as the LWB-24 and LWB-72 are widely used by Japanese broadcasters for field and OB van applications.

== See also ==
- Reel-to-reel audio tape recording
- Multitrack recording
- Audio engineering
- TEAC
