= Gabriel Garzón-Montano =

Colombian-French-American singer-songwriter and instrumentalist

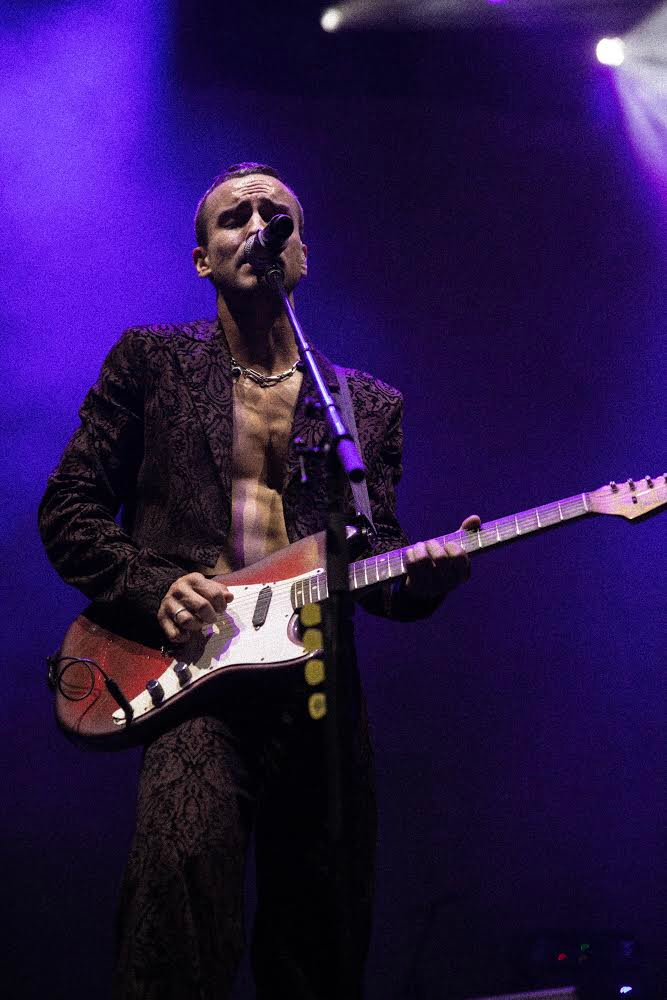
- Gabriel Garzón-Montano in 2018
- Born: Gabriel Lorenzo Garzón-Montano; June 27, 1989 (age 37); New York City, U.S.
- Education: SUNY Purchase
- Occupations: Singer-songwriter; multi-instrumentalist
- Years active: 2014–present
- Musical career
- Genres: Alternative R&B; soul; funk
- Instruments: Vocals; drums; piano; guitar; bass
- Labels: Stones Throw Records, Jagjaguwar
- Website: gabrielgarzonmontano.com

Gabriel Lorenzo Garzón-Montano (born June 27, 1989) is a Colombian-French-American singer-songwriter and multi-instrumentalist based in New York City. After earning a spotlight by opening for Lenny Kravitz's European tour in 2014 and being sampled in the Drake song "Jungle" in 2015, part of a Grammy nominated and double platinum album, Garzón-Montano released his debut album, Jardín in 2017 through Stones Throw Records. Garzón-Montano has performed at major U.S. and international venues. His music style blends R&B, soul, funk, and as of 2020, urban-reggaeton.

== Early life ==
Garzón-Montano was born and raised in Carroll Gardens, Brooklyn to immigrant parents, a French mother and a Colombian father. His mother was a member of the Philip Glass ensemble as a mezzo-soprano who played guitar, cello, and piano in the 1990s. Garzón-Montano stated he spent time during his childhood travelling alongside his mother touring Europe. An experienced musician, his mother is noted to have worked with Meredith Monk and Theo Bleckmann. He went to rehearsals as a freelance mezzo soprano and performed in the choir at the New York City Opera at Lincoln Center throughout his childhood. After his parents divorced at the age of five, Garzón-Montano would be flipped between homes, living at several addresses in New York City as well as back-and-forth trips to Colombia to see his father. At the age of 12, he learned the drums, and continued with the guitar, piano, and bass. Garzón-Montano performed in a 12-piece funk band called Mokaad during his college years where he learned to arrange funk music. He is a graduate of SUNY Purchase.

== Career ==
=== 2014–2016: Bishouné: Alma del Huila ===
On February 4, 2014, Garzon-Montano's Bishouné: Alma del Huila was released in conjunction with Styles Upon Styles, a Brooklyn based recording label. The extended play's title derives from his family heritage as Bishouné is a phonetic spelling of a childhood nickname his French mother called him, and Alma del Huila is a name for the Colombian municipality of Garzón, his father's last name. The 6-track extended play was Garzón-Montano's first release, and contained songs including "6 8" which had been written several years earlier. Garzón-Montano created tracks in GarageBand and would later record with Henry Hirsch at Waterfront Studios in Hudson, New York, where he played all the instruments to be tracked directly to 2-inch tape. After the project was completed, he pressed 500 vinyl copies of Bishouné with the indie label, which distributed it door-to-door to record stores in New York City. Singer Mayer Hawthorne heard the EP in a local record store and sent the album to Stones Throw Records which created the connection with the label for Garzon-Montano's next album. Lenny Kravitz invited Garzón-Montano to open his Strut 2014 European stadium tour. While Garzón-Montano was on tour in Europe, he received a message from long time friend Zoë Kravitz about Drake using his track "6 8" which ultimately resulted in "Jungle" from album If You're Reading This It's Too Late Later collaborations resulted in the singer working with British pop singer Eliza Doolittle. Garzón-Montano performed at Central Park's Summerstage as well as Lollapalooza in 2015, followed by another festival appearance at Estéreo Picnic Festival in Bogota, Colombia in 2016.

=== 2017–present: Jardín and Agüita ===
On January 27, 2017, Garzón-Montano released his debut studio album, Jardín, with Stones Throw Records. The album was supported by three single releases, "Sour Mango", "The Game", and "Crawl". The title of the album is a reference to his own heritage and language as it is spelled interchangeably between French and Spanish. Jardín, like his previous release, was recorded onto 2-inch tape to achieve the organic sound throughout the album. Imagery of fruit and plant life are components of the lyrics from "Sour Mango" to the cactus in "Crawl", as well as in sequences in "Fruitflies". Since the album's release, videos for the songs "Crawl" and "My Balloon" have been uploaded through Stones Throw. Garzón-Montano performed several showcases at SXSW in conjunction with entities such as Urban Outfitters and KCRW-Los Angeles. Jardín was a frequent feature of American Radio Station NPR. Garzón-Montano released an instrumental version of Jardín on September 22 on Stones Throw Records. Garzón-Montano announced a tour of Australia and Asia during the fall of 2017, as well as a performance at Tropico Festival in Acapulco, MX. In 2020, Gabriel Garzón-Montano announced and released his sophomore album, "Agüita". He described the album as "anti-genre" with him flirting with many diverse sounds including reggaeton, art rock, trap, hip hop, urbano, electronica, post-punk, folk and ambient music alongside the usual offerings of soul, funk and alternative R&B. In May 2020, Garzón-Montano released the lead single, "Someone" as well as a music video.

In 2021 he also received the Libera Awards as Best Latin Record 2021 for his album Agüita (Jagjaguwar/ Stone Throw Records) by the American Association of Independent Music (A2IM).

== Musical influences ==
Garzón-Montano mentions musical influencers such as Prince (whom Jardín is dedicated to), Stevie Wonder, Sly & The Family Stone, Marvin Gaye, The Beatles, and Radiohead. He was exposed to classical and avant garde music through his mother as well as to salsa and cumbia through his father. He credits artist Tierra Whack as a musical influence. He also cites Jeff Buckley, John Lennon, and The Notorious B.I.G. as influences. During an interview, Garzón-Montano references a purchase of some bargain greatest hits CDs that impacted him, which included music such as "Sing a Simple Song" by Sly and the Family Stone, as well as James Brown and Parliament. Some of his lyrical influences include German philosopher Nietzsche, and French poet Rimbaud. Garzón-Montano credits his multicultural upbringing as an influence through his music.

== Discography ==
- Bishouné: Alma del Huila (2014)
- Jardín (2017)
- Agüita (2020)
